= 2025 EFL Championship play-off final =

Association football match in London

2025 EFL Championship play-off Final
- Wembley Stadium in London hosted the final.
Sheffield United	Sunderland
1	2
- Date: 24 May 2025
- Venue: Wembley Stadium, London
- Man of the Match: Anthony Patterson (Sunderland)
- Referee: Chris Kavanagh
- Attendance: 82,718

The 2025 EFL Championship play-off final was an association football match which was played on 24 May 2025 at Wembley Stadium, London, that determined the third and final team to gain promotion from EFL Championship, the second tier of English football, to the Premier League. The top two teams of the 2024–25 EFL Championship, Leeds United and Burnley, gained automatic promotion to the Premier League, while the clubs placed from third to sixth in the table – Sheffield United, Sunderland, Coventry City and Bristol City – took part in the 2025 EFL play-offs semi-finals. The match kicked off at 15:01 with the extra minute being added to highlight the Every Minute Matters campaign, a collaboration between EFL sponsor Sky Bet and the British Heart Foundation which focused on the importance of learning CPR. The game had been described as the "richest game infootball" with the winners receiving a minimum of £220m in additional income.

Sunderland defeated Sheffield United in the final 2–1 after two late goals in the second half to secure promotion. It marks the club's return to the Premier League since the 2016–17 season.

== Route to the final ==
Final league position – Championship, leading positions
Pos	Team	Pld	W	D	L	GF	GA	GD	Pts	Qualification
1	Leeds United (C, P)	46	29	13	4	95	30	+65	100	Promotion to 2025–26 Premier League
2	Burnley (P)	46	28	16	2	69	16	+53	100	Promotion to 2025–26 Premier League
3	Sheffield United	46	28	8	10	63	36	+27	92	Qualified
4	Sunderland (O, P)	46	21	13	12	58	44	+14	76	Qualified
5	Coventry City	46	20	9	17	64	58	+6	69	Eliminated
6	Bristol City	46	17	17	12	59	55	+4	68	Eliminated

Source: EFL Official Website
(C) Champions; (O) Play-off winners; (P) Promoted

Sheffield United took a commanding lead in their Championship play-off semi-final after defeating ten-man Bristol City 3–0 in the first leg at Ashton Gate. The match turned just before half-time, when City defender Rob Dickie was shown a straight red card for a foul on Kieffer Moore, leading to a penalty that Harrison Burrows confidently converted in first-half stoppage time. Earlier, United had seen a goal controversially ruled out for offside and survived a scare when Joe Williams struck the crossbar for the hosts.

With a numerical advantage in the second half, Sheffield United pressed their advantage, as substitutes Andre Brooks and Callum O'Hare both found the net—Brooks doubling the lead with an acrobatic finish after a clever dummy from O’Hare, and the latter turning home Tom Davies’s knockdown to seal the win. The victory places United in a dominant position ahead of the second leg at Bramall Lane, while Bristol City face the daunting task of overturning a three-goal deficit.

Sheffield United secured their place in the Championship play-off final with a dominant 3–0 victory over Bristol City at Bramall Lane, completing a 6–0 aggregate win across the two legs. Kieffer Moore opened the scoring in the 41st minute, heading home to give United a commanding five-goal aggregate lead. Early in the second half, Gustavo Hamer doubled the advantage with a shot that took a significant deflection, wrong-footing City goalkeeper Max O'Leary. United’s dominance continued throughout the match, and Callum O’Hare sealed the result in the 83rd minute, sweeping home unchallenged to complete the scoring. With an emphatic 6–0 aggregate triumph, Sheffield United advanced to the playoff final at Wembley, where they will face Sunderland.

Sunderland took a slender lead in their Championship play-off semi-final, defeating Coventry City 2–1 at the Coventry Building Society Arena thanks to an 88th-minute winner from Eliezer Mayenda. After a tense opening, the match burst to life late on. Sunderland took the lead in the 78th minute when Wilson Isidor ended a long goal drought by firing a low shot under Coventry keeper Ben Wilson, only for the Sky Blues to respond immediately—just 110 seconds later—through Jack Rudoni’s powerful header from a Milan van Ewijk cross. However, an errant backpass by van Ewijk in the dying minutes allowed Mayenda, celebrating his 20th birthday, to round Wilson and score the decisive goal.

The match was notable for Sunderland ending a run of five straight defeats, while Coventry’s momentum under manager Frank Lampard was checked despite a lively home performance. Both managers praised their sides’ efforts, with Lampard focusing on the second leg at the Stadium of Light, where they eventually drew 1–1 but lost 3–2 on aggregate.

In the second leg of their Championship play-off semi-final, Sunderland hosted Coventry City at the Stadium of Light on 13 May 2025, holding a narrow 2–1 advantage from the first leg. The match was played in front of a passionate crowd, with Sunderland supporters unveiling a large “Till The End” black cat tifo as kickoff approached, reflecting the club’s hopes for a return to the Premier League for the first time since 2017. Both teams began with attacking intent—Sunderland in a 4-4-2 formation and Coventry in a 4-2-3-1—though the visitors dominated early possession and earned a sequence of corners. Coventry threatened through Ephron Mason-Clark and Tatsuhiro Sakamoto, with Sunderland defending resolutely and looking to break on the counter.

The first half was competitive and tense, characterized by robust midfield challenges, yellow cards, and few clear chances. Wilson Isidor and Eliezer Mayenda led Sunderland’s attacking efforts, coming closest when Mayenda forced a save from Ben Wilson and Isidor headed narrowly wide. Coventry’s Jack Rudoni and Milan van Ewijk combined well, but Sunderland’s defense remained organized. As the match progressed, Sunderland continued to soak up pressure and looked dangerous in transition, but neither side could break the deadlock.

Coventry’s efforts to overturn the deficit were initially rewarded in the second leg as they led 1–0 in the closing moments of regular time, but as the game was heading towards a penalty shootout after extra time, with the score tied 2–2 on aggregate, Sunderland defender Daniel Ballard fired in a header that beat the Coventry keeper and sent Sunderland fans at the Stadium of Light into a frenzy. The Black Cats advanced with a 3–2 aggregate victory and clinched their place in the Championship play-off final at Wembley, where they will face Sheffield United for a place in the Premier League. The result ended Coventry’s hopes of a top-flight return for the first time since 2001, while Sunderland moved to within one match of ending their eight-year absence from the top tier of English football.

== Match ==
=== Details ===
24 May 2025
15:01 BST

Sheffield United	1–2	Sunderland
Campbell 25'	Report	Mayenda 76'; Watson 90+5'

Wembley Stadium, London
Attendance: 82,718
Referee: Chris Kavanagh

Sheffield United	Sunderland

GK	1	(England) Michael Cooper
RB	24	(Bangladesh) Hamza Choudhury
CB	15	(Bosnia and Herzegovina) Anel Ahmedhodžić		(substituted off) 90+7'
CB	19	(England) Jack Robinson (c)
LB	14	(England) Harrison Burrows
RM	7	(England) Rhian Brewster	(yellow card) 59'	(substituted off) 65'
CM	42	(England) Sydie Peck		(substituted off) 90'
CM	21	(Brazil) Vinícius Souza
LM	8	(Netherlands) Gustavo Hamer		(substituted off) 72'
CF	9	(Wales) Kieffer Moore
CF	23	(England) Tyrese Campbell		(substituted off) 65'
Substitutes:
GK	17	(Wales) Adam Davies
DF	3	(England) Sam McCallum
DF	5	(England) Rob Holding
DF	38	(England) Femi Seriki		(substituted on) 90+7'
MF	10	(England) Callum O'Hare		(substituted on) 65'
MF	22	(England) Tom Davies		(substituted on) 90'
MF	35	(England) Andre Brooks		(substituted on) 65'
FW	20	(Chile) Ben Brereton Díaz	(yellow card) 85'	(substituted on) 72'	(substituted off) 90'
FW	28	(Republic of Ireland) Tom Cannon		(substituted on) 90'
Manager:
(England) Chris Wilder

GK	1	(England) Anthony Patterson
RB	32	(Northern Ireland) Trai Hume
CB	5	(Northern Ireland) Daniel Ballard
CB	13	(England) Luke O'Nien		(substituted off) 8'
LB	3	(England) Dennis Cirkin	(yellow card) 90+8'
RM	11	(England) Chris Rigg		(substituted off) 58'
CM	4	(England) Dan Neil (c)		(substituted off) 73'
CM	7	(England) Jobe Bellingham
LM	28	(France) Enzo Le Fée
CF	12	(Spain) Eliezer Mayenda		(substituted off) 90+8'
CF	14	(England) Romaine Mundle	(yellow card) 68'	(substituted off) 73'
Substitutes:
GK	21	(England) Simon Moore
DF	26	(Wales) Chris Mepham		(substituted on) 8'
DF	33	(Norway) Leo Hjelde		(substituted on) 90+8'
MF	8	(Republic of Ireland) Alan Browne
MF	10	(England) Patrick Roberts		(substituted on) 58'
MF	20	(Ghana) Salis Abdul Samed
MF	50	(England) Harrison Jones
FW	18	(France) Wilson Isidor		(substituted on) 73'
FW	40	(England) Tom Watson	(yellow card) 90+6'	(substituted on) 73'
Manager:
(France) Régis Le Bris

Man of the Match:
Anthony Patterson (Sunderland)
