= 2024–25 Sunderland A.F.C. season =

English football club season

Sunderland
2024–25 season
- Chairman: Kyril Louis-Dreyfus
- Head coach: Régis Le Bris
- Stadium: Stadium of Light
- Championship: 4th (promoted via play-offs)
- FA Cup: Third round
- EFL Cup: First round
- Top goalscorer: League: Wilson Isidor (13); All: Wilson Isidor (13)
- Highest home attendance: 44,009 vs Hull City (EFL Championship); 46,530 vs Coventry City (Championship play-offs)
- Lowest home attendance: 35,421 vs Bristol City (EFL Championship); 15,774 vs Stoke City (FA Cup)
- Average home league attendance: 40,704
- Biggest win: 4–0 vs Sheffield Wednesday (EFL Championship)
- Biggest defeat: 0–3 vs Coventry (EFL Championship)
Home colours	Away colours	Third colours

The 2024–25 season was the 146th season in the history of Sunderland Association Football Club and their third consecutive season in the Championship. The club participated in the Championship, the FA Cup, and the EFL Cup.

Despite Sunderland starting the season with 9 wins from their first 12 games to put them on top of the table, a run of 5 draws and 1 loss from their next 6 games dropped the Black Cats into 4th place where they would remain for the rest of the season to earn a place in the playoffs, despite losing their last 5 games of the season. Sunderland would go on to make the play-off final after beating Coventry City 3–2 on aggregate in the semi finals. They would go on to beat Sheffield United 2–1 in the play-off final to win promotion to the Premier League, marking the Black Cats return to the top-flight for the first time since 2017.

== Transfers ==
=== In ===
Date	Pos.	Player	From	Fee	Ref.
1 July 2024 (Note: The transfer was announced on 21 June, and became official on 1 July when his Coventry City contract expired.)	GK	(England) Simon Moore	(England) Coventry City	Free	
11 July 2024	CM	(Republic of Ireland) Alan Browne	(England) Preston North End	Free	
24 July 2024	RW	(Colombia) Ian Poveda	(England) Leeds United	Free	
29 July 2024	DM	(Germany) Elias Lenz (Note: Signed initially for the Under-21s.)	(Germany) RB Leipzig	Free	
2 August 2024	GK	(Cameroon) Blondy Nna Noukeu	(England) Stoke City	Free	
30 August 2024	AM	(Serbia) Milan Aleksić	(Serbia) FK Radnički 1923	Undisclosed	
30 August 2024	ST	(Nigeria) Ahmed Abdullahi	(Belgium) KAA Gent	Undisclosed	
24 September 2024	ST	(Republic of Ireland) Aaron Connolly	(England) Hull City	Free	
1 February 2025	ST	(France) Wilson Isidor	(Russia) Zenit Saint Petersburg	Undisclosed	

=== Out ===
Date	Pos.	Player	To	Fee	Ref.
18 June 2024	GK	(England) Alex Bass	(England) Notts County	Undisclosed	
8 August 2024	AM	(England) Elliot Embleton	(England) Blackpool	Undisclosed	
24 August 2024	LW	(England) Jack Clarke	(England) Ipswich Town	Undisclosed (Note: Fee rumoured between £15,000,000 and £20,000,000.)	
9 March 2025	LW	(Costa Rica) Jewison Bennette	(Ukraine) LNZ Cherkasy	Undisclosed	

=== Loaned in ===
Date	Pos.	Player	From	Date until	Ref.
23 August 2024	ST	(France) Wilson Isidor	(Russia) Zenit Saint Petersburg	End of Season (Note: Includes an option to make the transfer permanent, which was activated on 1 February)	
30 August 2024	CB	(Wales) Chris Mepham	(England) AFC Bournemouth	End of Season	
30 August 2024	DM	(Ghana) Salis Abdul Samed	(France) Lens	End of Season	
10 January 2025	CM	(France) Enzo Le Fée	(Italy) Roma	End of Season (Note: Includes an option to make the transfer permanent, which was activated on 3 June.)	
3 February 2025	ST	(England) Jayden Danns	(England) Liverpool	End of Season	

=== Loaned out ===
Date	Pos.	Player	To	Date until	Ref.
1 July 2024 (Note: The loan was announced on 25 June, and officially commenced on 1 July.)	GK	(England) Nathan Bishop	(England) Wycombe Wanderers	3 February 2025 (Note: On 3 February, Bishop was recalled from his loan at Wycombe and subsequently loaned to Cambridge)	
18 July 2024	GK	(England) Matty Young	(England) Salford City	End of Season	
2 August 2024	LB	(England) Oliver Bainbridge	(Scotland) Kilmarnock	10 January 2025 (Note: On 10 January, Bainbridge was recalled back from his loan at Kilmarnock)	
8 August 2024	CM	(England) Jay Matete	(England) Bolton Wanderers	End of Season	
23 August 2024	CM	(England) Ben Middlemas	(England) South Shields	22 September 2024	
30 August 2024	DM	(France) Pierre Ekwah	(France) Saint-Étienne	End of Season (Note: Includes an option to make the transfer permanent)	
30 August 2024	RB	(France) Timothée Pembélé	(France) Le Havre	End of Season	
30 August 2024	CB	(Australia) Nectarios Triantis	(Scotland) Hibernian	End of Season	
31 August 2024	ST	(Portugal) Luís Semedo	(Italy) Juventus Next Gen	End of Season	
20 September 2024	GK	(England) Adam Richardson	(England) Hebburn Town	19 October 2024	
17 October 2024	AM	(England) Caden Kelly	(England) Darlington	31 January 2025 (Note: On 21 November, Kelly's loan at Darlington was extended until January, On 7 January, his loan was extended again until the end of January and on 4 February, extended again until the end of season)	
7 November 2024	GK	(England) Adam Richardson	(England) Blyth Spartans	31 January 2025	
22 November 2024	CB	(England) Ben Crompton	(England) Tamworth	End of Season (Note: On 21 December, Crompton's loan at Tamworth was extended for a further month, Then on January 25, it was extended further until the end of season)	
13 January 2025	CB	(England) Zak Johnson	(England) Notts County	End of Season	
25 January 2025	ST	(Ukraine) Nazariy Rusyn	(Croatia) Hajduk Split	End of Season	
31 January 2025	AM	(France) Adil Aouchiche	(England) Portsmouth	End of Season	
3 February 2025	RM	(France) Abdoullah Ba	(France) Dunkerque	End of Season	
3 February 2025	GK	(England) Nathan Bishop	(England) Cambridge United	End of Season	
13 March 2025	GK	(England) Dan Cameron	(England) Hebburn Town	End of Season	

=== Released / Out of Contract ===
Date	Pos.	Player	Subsequent club	Join date	Ref.
30 June 2024	LW	(England) Jack Diamond	(England) Stockport County	1 July 2024	
30 June 2024	LW	(England) Michael Spellman	(Wales) Newport County	2 July 2024	
30 June 2024	LB	(England) Connor Pye	(England) Bury	16 July 2024	
30 June 2024	RM	(England) Ellis Taylor	(England) Harrogate Town	16 July 2024	
30 June 2024	LB	(England) Kailem Beattie	(England) Heaton Stannington	24 July 2024	
30 June 2024 (Note: Rejected contract and subsequently joined Queen's Park.)	CB	(England) Henry Fieldson	(Scotland) Queen's Park	9 August 2024	
30 June 2024	LW	(England) Joe Ryder	(United States) High Point Panthers	9 August 2024	
30 June 2024	AM	(England) Bradley Dack	(England) Gillingham	15 August 2024	
30 June 2024	ST	(England) Harry Gardiner	(England) Blyth Spartans	25 August 2024	
30 June 2024	RB	(Northern Ireland) Callum Wilson	(England) Rushall Olympic	13 September 2024	
30 June 2024	RW	(England) Ben Creamer	(England) Bishop Auckland	18 September 2024	
30 June 2024	RB	(Fiji) Jayden Sekete	(England) Darlington	27 September 2024	
30 June 2024	CM	(Northern Ireland) Corry Evans	(England) Bradford City	6 October 2024	
30 June 2024	CM	(England) Tom Chiabi			
30 June 2024	LW	(England) Daniel Obolo			
16 January 2025 (Note: Mutual agreement to terminate Sunderland contract.)	ST	(Republic of Ireland) Aaron Connolly	(England) Millwall	16 January 2025	

== Pre-season and friendlies ==
On 17 May, Sunderland announced their first slate of pre-season fixtures, against South Shields, Gateshead, Blackpool and Bradford City. A weeks training camp in Alicante was later confirmed with a fixtures against Eldense and Nottingham Forest. On July 16, a final friendly was confirmed, against Marseille in Bradford.

Win Draw Loss Fixtures

13 July 2024 Friendly	South Shields	0–5	Sunderland	Jarrow
12:30 BST		Report	Roberts 2'; Hume 9'; Rigg 30'; Mayenda 38' (pen.); Aouchiche 42'	Stadium: Mariners Park

13 July 2024 Friendly	Gateshead	2–1	Sunderland	Gateshead
17:00 BST	Oseni 19', 44'	Report	Clarke 27' (pen.)	Stadium: Gateshead International Stadium

19 July 2024 Friendly	Nottingham Forest	1–1	Sunderland	San Pedro del Pinatar, Spain
19:00 CEST (18:00 BST)	Richards 48'	Report	Clarke 39' (pen.)	Stadium: Pinatar Arena

21 July 2024 Friendly	Eldense	1–2	Sunderland	San Pedro del Pinatar, Spain
19:00 CEST (18:00 BST)	Piña 30'		Watson 22'; Semedo 79'	Stadium: Pinatar Arena

27 July 2024 Friendly	Blackpool	0–1	Sunderland	Blackpool
15:00 BST		Report	Clarke 84'	Stadium: Bloomfield Road

30 July 2024 Friendly	Bradford City	2–1	Sunderland	Bradford
19:30 BST	Cook 40'; Kavanagh 42'		Mundle 66'	Stadium: Valley Parade

3 August 2024 Friendly	Sunderland	2–2	Marseille	Bradford
15:00 BST	Cirkin 52'; Aouchiche 80' (pen.)	Report	Moumbagna 27'; Koné 59'	Stadium: Valley Parade

== Competitions ==
=== Championship ===
==== League table ====
Pos	Team	Pld	W	D	L	GF	GA	GD	Pts	Promotion, qualification or relegation
2	Burnley (P)	46	28	16	2	69	16	+53	100	Promotion to the Premier League
3	Sheffield United	46	28	8	10	63	36	+27	90 (Note: Sheffield United were deducted two points for defaulting on payments to other clubs during the 2022–23 and 2023–24 seasons, with a further two points suspended.)	Qualified for the Championship play-offs
4	Sunderland (O, P)	46	21	13	12	58	44	+14	76	Qualified for the Championship play-offs
5	Coventry City	46	20	9	17	64	58	+6	69	Qualified for the Championship play-offs
6	Bristol City	46	17	17	12	59	55	+4	68	Qualified for the Championship play-offs

Source: English Football League
Rules for classification: 1) Points; 2) Goal difference; 3) Number of goals scored; 4) Head-to-head results; 5) Wins; 6) Away goals; 7) Penalty points (sec 9.5); 8) Number of 12-point sending off offences; 9) Play-off (only if needed to determine promotion/relegation)
(O) Play-off winners; (P) Promoted

==== Results summary ====
Overall								Home						Away					
Pld	W	D	L	GF	GA	GD	Pts	W	D	L	GF	GA	GD	W	D	L	GF	GA	GD
46	21	13	12	58	44	+14	76	12	7	4	32	18	+14	9	6	8	26	26	0

Source: Soccerway

==== Results by round ====
Round	1	2	3	4	5	6	7	8	9	10	11	12	13	14	15	16	17	18	19	20	21	22	23	24	25	26	27	28	29	30	31	32	33	34	35	36	37	38	39	40	41	42	43	44	45	46
Ground	A	H	H	A	A	H	A	H	H	A	A	H	A	A	H	A	H	A	H	H	A	H	A	A	H	H	A	A	H	A	H	H	A	H	A	H	H	A	H	A	A	H	A	H	A	H
Result	W	W	W	W	L	W	L	W	D	W	W	W	D	D	D	D	D	L	W	D	W	W	D	L	W	W	D	W	D	W	D	W	L	L	W	W	D	L	W	W	D	L	L	L	L	L
Position	4	2	1	1	2	2	2	1	1	1	1	1	1	1	1	2	4	4	4	4	4	4	4	4	4	4	4	4	4	4	4	4	4	4	4	4	4	4	4	4	4	4	4	4	4	4
Points	3	6	9	12	12	15	15	18	19	22	25	28	29	30	31	32	33	33	36	37	40	43	44	44	47	50	51	54	55	58	59	62	62	62	65	68	69	69	72	75	76	76	76	76	76	76

Source: Soccerway
A = Away; H = Home; W = Win; D = Draw; L = Loss

==== Matches ====
The league fixtures were announced on 26 June 2024.

Win Draw Loss Fixtures

10 August 2024 1	Cardiff City	0–2	Sunderland	Cardiff
12:30 BST	Siopis (yellow card) 89'	Report	O'Nien 18'; Hume (yellow card) 51'; Alese (yellow card) 81'; Clarke 89'	Stadium: Cardiff City Stadium; Attendance: 21,401 (2,600 away fans); Referee: Andy Davies

18 August 2024 2	Sunderland	4–0	Sheffield Wednesday	Sunderland
12:00 BST	Cirkin 11'; Mayenda 15', 47'; O'Nien 24'	Report	Ingelsson (yellow card) 26'; Bernard (yellow card) 82'; Palmer (yellow card) 85'	Stadium: Stadium of Light; Attendance: 40,022 (2,000 away fans); Referee: Dean Whitestone
Note: Fixture was initially scheduled for 17 August, but was moved for live Sky Sports broadcast.

24 August 2024 3	Sunderland	1–0	Burnley	Sunderland
15:00 BST	Mundle 26'; Neil (yellow card) 40' (yellow-red card) 85'; Hume (yellow card) 51'; Rusyn (yellow card) 90+4'	Report	Egan-Riley (yellow card) 9'; Foster (yellow card) 54'; Rodriguez (yellow card) 83'	Stadium: Stadium of Light; Attendance: 40,096 (1,400 away fans); Referee: Steve Martin

31 August 2024 4	Portsmouth	1–3	Sunderland	Portsmouth
15:00 BST	Kamara (yellow card) 78'; Swanson (yellow card) 88'; O'Nien 90+1' (o.g.); Yengi (yellow card) 90+2'	Report	Swanson 31' (o.g.); Rigg (yellow card) 44'; Browne 52'; Mundle 56'	Stadium: Fratton Park; Attendance: 20,231 (2,500 away fans); Referee: Sam Allison

14 September 2024 5	Plymouth Argyle	3–2	Sunderland	Plymouth
15:00 BST	Gyabi (yellow card) 28'; Whittaker (yellow card) 46'; Ballard 54' (o.g.); Szűcs (yellow card) 57'; Hardie 73'; Edwards (yellow card) 82', (goal) 90+3'	Report	Roberts 24' (pen.), (yellow card) 81'; Bellingham (yellow card) 48'; Mundle (yellow card) 56', (goal) 86'; Hume (yellow card) 59'	Stadium: Home Park; Attendance: 16,967 (1,723 away fans); Referee: John Brooks

21 September 2024 6	Sunderland	1–0	Middlesbrough	Sunderland
12:30 BST	Hume (yellow card) 9'; Rigg 24', (yellow card) 70'; Roberts (yellow card) 45+5'	Report	Latte Lath (yellow card) 20'	Stadium: Stadium of Light; Attendance: 42,871 (2,000 away fans); Referee: Simon Hooper
Note: Fixture was initially scheduled for a 15:00 kick-off, but was moved for live Sky Sports broadcast.

28 September 2024 7	Watford	2–1	Sunderland	Watford
15:00 BST	Ebosele 28', (yellow card) 30'; Dele-Bashiru 84' (pen.)	Report	Bellingham (yellow card) 45'; Isidor 49'	Stadium: Vicarage Road; Attendance: 20,335 (2,100 away fans); Referee: Andy Davies

1 October 2024 8	Sunderland	2–0	Derby County	Sunderland
19:45 BST	Cirkin (yellow card) 25'; Bellingham 40'; Isidor 55'; Mepham (yellow card) 59'	Report	Harness (yellow card) 36'; Goudmijn (yellow card) 59'	Stadium: Stadium of Light; Attendance: 39,017 (1,200 away fans); Referee: Dean Whitestone

4 October 2024 9	Sunderland	2–2	Leeds United	Sunderland
20:00 BST	Rigg 9', (yellow card) 65'; Bellingham (yellow card) 46'; Neil (yellow card) 61'; Firpo 90+7' (o.g.)	Report	Piroe 22'; Rodon (yellow card) 39'; Firpo 56', (yellow card) 68'; Bogle (yellow card) 90+6'	Stadium: Stadium of Light; Attendance: 41,769 (2,000 away fans); Referee: Tim Robinson
Note: Fixture was initially scheduled for 5 October, but was moved for live Sky Sports broadcast.

20 October 2024 10	Hull City	0–1	Sunderland	Kingston upon Hull
15:00 BST	Jones (yellow card) 63'	Report	Isidor 63'; Roberts (yellow card) 83'	Stadium: MKM Stadium; Attendance: 23,072 (2,400 away fans); Referee: Bobby Madley
Note: Fixture was initially scheduled for 19 October, but was moved for live Sky Sports broadcast.

23 October 2024 11	Luton Town	1–2	Sunderland	Luton
19:45 BST	Adebayo 63'; Holmes (yellow card) 90+8'; Morris (yellow card) 90+8'	Report	Rigg (yellow card) 29', (goal) 55'; Mundle 66'; Patterson (yellow card) 74'; Bellingham (yellow card) 90+8'; O'Nien (yellow card) 90+8'	Stadium: Kenilworth Road; Attendance: 11,332 (1,300 away fans); Referee: Tom Nield

26 October 2024 12	Sunderland	2–0	Oxford United	Sunderland
16:00 BST	Bellingham 16'; Mepham (yellow card) 23'; Isidor (yellow card) 37', (goal) 63'	Report	Scarlett (yellow card) 51'	Stadium: Stadium of Light; Attendance: 40,654 (950 away fans); Referee: Oliver Langford

2 November 2024 13	Queens Park Rangers	0–0	Sunderland	Shepherd's Bush
15:00 GMT	Celar (yellow card) 78'	Report	Bellingham (red card) 58'; Moore (yellow card) 70'; Roberts (yellow card) 90+6'	Stadium: Loftus Road; Attendance: 17,422 (1,700 away fans); Referee: Ben Toner

6 November 2024 14	Preston North End	0–0	Sunderland	Preston
20:00 GMT	Whiteman (yellow card) 37'; Lindsay (yellow card) 59'	Report	Mepham (yellow card) 5'	Stadium: Deepdale; Attendance: 18,064 (5,072 away fans); Referee: Lewis Smith
Note: Fixture was initially scheduled for a 19:45 kick-off, but was moved for live Sky Sports broadcast.

9 November 2024 15	Sunderland	2–2	Coventry City	Sunderland
15:00 GMT	Roberts (yellow card) 15'; Isidor 17', (yellow card) 69'; Cirkin 35'; Hume (yellow card) 69'	Report	Wright 62'; Latibeaudiere (yellow card) 64'; Binks (yellow card) 69'; Rudoni 84'; Sakamoto (yellow card) 90+6'; Bassette (yellow card) 90+8'	Stadium: Stadium of Light; Attendance: 43,374 (900 away fans); Referee: Leigh Doughty

23 November 2024 16	Millwall	1–1	Sunderland	Bermondsey
15:00 GMT	Esse (yellow card) 86'; Azeez 90+3'	Report	Connolly 10'; Aleksić (yellow card) 77'; Mepham (yellow card) 87'	Stadium: The Den; Attendance: 18,385 (3,000 away fans); Referee: John Busby

26 November 2024 17	Sunderland	0–0	West Bromwich Albion	Sunderland
20:00 GMT		Report		Stadium: Stadium of Light; Attendance: 36,733 (750 away fans); Referee: Bobby Madley
Note: Fixture was initially scheduled for a 19:45 kick-off, but was moved for live Sky Sports broadcast.

29 November 2024 18	Sheffield United	1–0	Sunderland	Sheffield
20:00 GMT	Robinson (yellow card) 28'; Souttar (yellow card) 35' (yellow-red card) 45+2'; Hamer (yellow card) 75'; Davies 83', (yellow card) 90+5'; Oné (yellow card) 90+1'	Report	Roberts (penalty missed) 29'; Mepham (red card) 40'; O'Nien (yellow card) 65'; Ballard (yellow card) 90+3'	Stadium: Bramall Lane; Attendance: 28,465 (2,700 away fans); Referee: Gavin Ward
Note: Fixture was initially scheduled for 30 November, but was moved for live Sky Sports broadcast.

7 December 2024 19	Sunderland	2–1	Stoke City	Sunderland
12:30 GMT	Watson 7', 86'	Report	Koumas 6'	Stadium: Stadium of Light; Attendance: 39,311 (700 away fans); Referee: Craig Pawson
Note: Fixture was initially scheduled for a 15:00 kick-off, but was moved for live Sky Sports broadcast.

10 December 2024 20	Sunderland	1–1	Bristol City	Sunderland
19:45 GMT	Rigg (yellow card) 68'; Roberts (yellow card) 86', (goal) 90+3'	Report	Vyner (yellow card) 37'; McNally (yellow card) 44', (goal) 62'; Mehmeti (yellow card) 83'; Pring (yellow card) 84'; Knight (yellow card) 90+2'	Stadium: Stadium of Light; Attendance: 35,421 (300 away fans); Referee: Dean Whitestone

14 December 2024 21	Swansea City	2–3	Sunderland	Swansea
15:00 GMT	Vipotnik 5'; Cullen 17'; Cabango (yellow card) 22'	Report	Bellingham (yellow card) 16', (goal) 75'; Ballard 28'; Cirkin (yellow card) 52'; Neil 73'; Rigg (yellow card) 89'; Isidor (yellow card) 90+2'	Stadium: Swansea.cpm Stadium; Attendance: 15,791 (1,971 away fans); Referee: Andy Davies

21 December 2024 22	Sunderland	2–1	Norwich City	Sunderland
15:00 GMT	O'Nien (yellow card) 39'; Isidor (yellow card) 42'; Ballard 47', (yellow card) 68'; Mepham (yellow card) 49'; Cirkin (yellow card) 57'; Bellingham 72'	Report	Ben Slimane 21', (yellow card) 56'; Córdoba (yellow card) 42' (yellow-red card) 70'; Doyle (yellow card) 53'; Núñez (yellow card) 60'	Stadium: Stadium of Light; Attendance: 40,114 (800 away fans); Referee: Leigh Doughty

26 December 2024 23	Blackburn Rovers	2–2	Sunderland	Blackburn
15:00 GMT	Ohashi 13', (yellow card) 29'; Hyam (yellow card) 58'; Leonard 90'	Report	Hume (yellow card) 33'; Rigg 51'; Isidor 55'; O'Nien (yellow card) 83'; Roberts (yellow card) 90+4'	Stadium: Ewood Park; Attendance: 24,961 (7,383 away fans); Referee: Bobby Madley

29 December 2024 24	Stoke City	1–0	Sunderland	Stoke-on-Trent
15:00 GMT	Phillips (yellow card) 16'; Gooch (yellow card) 21'; Moran (yellow card) 27'; Johansson (yellow card) 43'; Cannon 90+2', (yellow card) 90+3'	Report	Cirkin (yellow card) 51'; Bellingham (yellow card) 71'	Stadium: Bet365 Stadium; Attendance: 23,654 (3,300 away fans); Referee: James Bell

1 January 2025 25	Sunderland	2–1	Sheffield United	Sunderland
20:00 GMT	Mayenda 27'; Isidor 35' (yellow card) 73'; Hume (yellow card) 52'; O'Nien (yellow card) 77'; Alese (yellow card) 86'	Report	O'Nien 32' (o.g.); Robinson (yellow card) 88'	Stadium: Stadium of Light; Attendance: 42,276 (1,600 away fans); Referee: Matt Donohue
Note: Fixture was initially scheduled for a 15:00 kick-off, but was moved for live Sky Sports broadcast.

5 January 2025 26	Sunderland	1–0	Portsmouth	Sunderland
15:00 GMT	Isidor 7'; Mepham (yellow card) 90+2'	Report	Towler (yellow card) 58'; Swanson (yellow card) 64'; Pack (red card) 67'	Stadium: Stadium of Light; Attendance: 39,846 (700 away fans); Referee: Thomas Bramall
Note: Fixture was initially scheduled for 4 January, but was moved for live Sky Sports broadcast.

17 January 2025 27	Burnley	0–0	Sunderland	Burnley
20:00 GMT	Egan-Riley (yellow card) 84'; Trafford (yellow card) 90+7'	Report	Le Fée (yellow card) 87'	Stadium: Turf Moor; Attendance: 21,014 (2,200 away fans); Referee: Anthony Backhouse
Note: Fixture was initially scheduled for 18 January, but was moved for live Sky Sports broadcasting.

21 January 2025 28	Derby County	0–1	Sunderland	Derby
19:45 GMT	Harness (yellow card) 50'	Report	Mayenda 28'; Bellingham (yellow card) 33'	Stadium: Pride Park Stadium; Attendance: 27,441 (2,700 away fans); Referee: Sam Allison

25 January 2025 29	Sunderland	2–2	Plymouth Argyle	Sunderland
15:00 GMT	Isidor 60', (yellow card) 72'; Hume 72'	Report	Pleguezuelo (yellow card) 28'; Bundu (yellow card) 53'; Patterson 58' (o.g.); Sorinola (yellow card) 71'; Gyabi (yellow card) 79'; Ogbeta 90'	Stadium: Stadium of Light; Attendance: 41,097 (800 away fans); Referee: Oliver Langford

3 February 2025 30	Middlesbrough	2–3	Sunderland	Middlesbrough
20:00 GMT	Burgzorg 11'; Morris (yellow card) 20'; Hackney 59', (yellow card) 78'	Report	Neil 33'; O'Nien (yellow card) 45'; Isidor 51'; Bellingham (yellow card) 63'; Giles 87' (o.g.); Poveda (yellow card) 90+5'	Stadium: Riverside Stadium; Attendance: 29,161 (2,500 away fans); Referee: Stephen Martin
Note: Fixture was initially scheduled for 1 February, but was moved for live Sky Sports broadcasting.

8 February 2025 31	Sunderland	2–2	Watford	Sunderland
12:30 GMT	O'Nien 16'; Cirkin (yellow card) 32' (goal) 89'; Isidor (yellow card) 35'; Le Fée (yellow card) 64'; Mepham (yellow card) 80'; Poveda (yellow card) 90+6'	Report	Doumbia (yellow card) 31'; Dele-Bashiru 43' (pen.); Louza 46'	Stadium: Stadium of Light; Attendance: 41,329 (350 away fans); Referee: Robert Jones
Note: Fixture was initially scheduled for a 15:00 kick-off, but was moved for live Sky Sports broadcasting.

12 February 2025 32	Sunderland	2–0	Luton Town	Sunderland
19:45 GMT	Le Fée 13'; Isidor 58'	Report	Fanne (yellow card) 54'; Johnson (yellow card) 90+4'	Stadium: Stadium of Light; Attendance: 37,929 (400 away fans); Referee: John Busby

17 February 2025 33	Leeds United	2–1	Sunderland	Leeds
20:00 GMT	Tanaka (yellow card) 31'; Bogle (yellow card) 45+1'; Struijk 78', 90+5'; Firpo (yellow card) 90'	Report	Isidor 32', (yellow card) 45+3'; Bellingham (yellow card) 56'; Hume (yellow card) 61'; Cirkin (yellow card) 80'; Patterson (yellow card) 83'; O'Nien (yellow card) 90+3'	Stadium: Elland Road; Attendance: 36,804 (2,900 away fans); Referee: Stuart Attwell
Note: Fixture was initially scheduled for 15 February, but was moved for live Sky Sports broadcasting.

22 February 2025 34	Sunderland	0–1	Hull City	Sunderland
12:30 GMT			Patterson 18' (o.g.); Matazo (yellow card) 45+1'; Pandur (yellow card) 74'; Egan (yellow card) 90+4'	Stadium: Stadium of Light; Attendance: 44,009 (2,000 away fans); Referee: Farai Hallam
Note: Fixture was initially scheduled for a 15:00 kick-off, but was moved for live Sky Sports broadcasting.

28 February 2025 35	Sheffield Wednesday	1–2	Sunderland	Sheffield
20:00 GMT	Paterson 48'; Hatsuse (yellow card) 52'		Mayenda 34', 71', (yellow card) 72'	Stadium: Hillsborough Stadium; Attendance: 27,954 (3,800 away fans); Referee: Will Finnie
Note: Fixture was initially scheduled for 1 March, but was moved for live Sky Sports broadcasting.

8 March 2025 36	Sunderland	2–1	Cardiff City	Sunderland
15:00 GMT	Mayenda 2'; Hjelde (yellow card) 56'; Mepham 77'		Davies 41'; Chambers (yellow card) 63'; Bagan (yellow card) 69'	Stadium: Stadium of Light; Attendance: 40,644 (450 away fans); Referee: Darren Bond

11 March 2025 37	Sunderland	1–1	Preston North End	Sunderland
19:45 GMT	Hume (yellow card) 20'; Mundle 86'		Gibson (yellow card) 23'; Kesler-Hayden (yellow card) 52'; Riis Jakobsen 65'; Woodman (yellow card) 90'	Stadium: Stadium of Light; Attendance: 37,771 (270 away fans); Referee: Lewis Smith

15 March 2025 38	Coventry City	3–0	Sunderland	Coventry
15:00 GMT	Wright 21', 29' (pen.), 73'; Kitching (yellow card) 65'	Report	Hume (yellow card) 54'; Rigg (yellow card) 56'	Stadium: Coventry Building Society Arena; Attendance: 30,219 (3,000 away fans); Referee: Dean Whitestone

29 March 2025 39	Sunderland	1–0	Millwall	Sunderland
15:00 GMT	Bellingham (yellow card) 13'; Hume 20'; Mepham (yellow card) 26'; Isidor (yellow card) 69'; Watson (yellow card) 90+4'	Report	Emakhu (yellow card) 36'; Connolly (yellow card) 44'; De Norre (yellow card) 73'	Stadium: Stadium of Light; Attendance: 41,762 (600 away fans); Referee: Bobby Madley

5 April 2025 40	West Bromwich Albion	0–1	Sunderland	West Bromwich
12:30 BST	Molumby (yellow card) 65'; Styles (yellow card) 88'	Report	Hume 35'; Browne (yellow card) 59'; Roberts (yellow card) 60'; Mayenda (yellow card) 62'	Stadium: The Hawthorns; Attendance: 25,918 (2,522 away fans); Referee: Tom Nield
Note: Fixture was initially scheduled for a 15:00 kick-off, but was moved for live Sky Sports broadcasting.

8 April 2025 41	Norwich City	0–0	Sunderland	Norwich
19:45 BST	Fisher (yellow card) 50'; McLean (yellow card) 53'	Report	O'Nien (yellow card) 26'; Watson (yellow card) 32'; Hjelde (yellow card) 57'; Jones (yellow card) 86'	Stadium: Carrow Road; Attendance: 26,320 (1,800 away fans); Referee: Jeremy Simpson

12 April 2025 42	Sunderland	0–1	Swansea City	Sunderland
15:00 BST	Mepham (yellow card) 31'; Hume (yellow card) 60'	Report	O'Brien (yellow card) 31'; Cabango 58', (yellow card) 74'; Fulton (yellow card) 62'	Stadium: Stadium of Light; Attendance: 42,362 (400 away fans); Referee: Farai Hallam

18 April 2025 43	Bristol City	2–1	Sunderland	Bristol
15:00 BST	Pring (yellow card) 48'; Dickie 55'; McCrorie 76'	Report	Hume (red card) 7'; Mayenda 31'; Patterson (yellow card) 66'; Hjelde (yellow card) 80'; Anderson (yellow card) 89'	Stadium: Ashton Gate; Attendance: 25,915 (3,400 away fans); Referee: Oliver Langford

21 April 2025 44	Sunderland	0–1	Blackburn Rovers	Sunderland
15:00 BST	Rigg (yellow card) 82'	Report	Dolan 33'; Hedges (yellow card) 73'; Forshaw (yellow card) 82'	Stadium: Stadium of Light; Attendance: 40,031 (550 away fans); Referee: James Bell

26 April 2025 45	Oxford United	2–0	Sunderland	Oxford
15:00 BST	Goodrham (yellow card) 14'; Rodrigues (yellow card) 28'; Nelson 29'; Helik 48'; Vaulks (yellow card) 64'	Report	Mepham (yellow card) 42'	Stadium: Kassam Stadium; Attendance: 11,431 (1,800 away fans); Referee: Tim Robinson

3 May 2025 46	Sunderland	0–1	Queens Park Rangers	Sunderland
12:30 BST	Neil (yellow card) 29'; O'Nien (yellow card) 55'	Report	Madsen 5', (yellow card) 74'; Kolli (yellow card) 56'; Frey (yellow card) 90+4'	Stadium: Stadium of Light; Attendance: 41,917 (450 away fans); Referee: Anthony Backhouse
Note: Fixture was initially scheduled for a 15:00 kick-off, but all EFL Championship final matchday fixtures were moved to an earlier kick-off.

==== Play-offs ====
Sunderland finished 4th, in the regular season and were drawn against 5th place Coventry City.

===== Semi-finals =====
9 May 2025 Semi final (1st leg)	Coventry City	1–2	Sunderland	Coventry
20:00 BST	Sheaf (yellow card) 55'; Van Ewijk (yellow card) 59'; Kitching (yellow card) 63'; Rudoni 70'	Report	Cirkin (yellow card) 21'; Isidor 68'; Mayenda 88'	Stadium: Coventry Building Society Arena; Attendance: 31,293 (2,785 away fans); Referee: John Busby

13 May 2025 Semi final (2nd leg)	Sunderland	1–1 (a.e.t.) (3–2 agg.)	Coventry City	Sunderland
20:00 BST	Isidor (yellow card) 12'; Roberts (yellow card) 31'; Bellingham (yellow card) 68'; Le Fée (yellow card) 78'; Rigg (yellow card) 109'; Ballard 120+3', (yellow card) 120+4'	Report	Sheaf (yellow card) 24'; Thomas (yellow card) 33'; Wilson (yellow card) 68'; Mason-Clark 76'	Stadium: Stadium of Light; Attendance: 46,530 (2,500 away fans); Referee: Andrew Madley

===== Final =====
24 May 2025 Final	Sheffield United	1–2	Sunderland	Wembley
15:01 BST	Campbell 25'; Brewster (yellow card) 59'; Brereton (yellow card) 85'	Report	Mundle (yellow card) 68'; Mayenda 76'; Watson 90+5', (yellow card) 90+6'; Cirkin (yellow card) 90+8'	Stadium: Wembley Stadium; Attendance: 82,718; Referee: Chris Kavanagh

=== FA Cup ===
Sunderland entered the FA Cup in the third round, and were drawn at home to Stoke City.

Win Draw Loss Fixtures

11 January 2025 Third round	Sunderland	1–2 (a.e.t.)	Stoke City	Sunderland
15:00 GMT	Rigg (yellow card) 23'; Aleksić 64'	Report	Cannon 4' (pen.); Baker (yellow card) 63'; Moran (yellow card) 72'; Burger (yellow card) 93'; Tchamadeu (yellow card) 99'; Ennis 112'	Stadium: Stadium of Light; Attendance: 15,774; Referee: Elliot Bell

=== EFL Cup ===
On 27 June, the draw for the first round was made, with Sunderland being drawn away against Preston North End. They were beaten by Preston North End in that match and as a result were knocked out of the competition.

Win Draw Loss Fixtures

13 August 2024 First round	Preston North End	2–0	Sunderland	Preston
19:45 BST	Brady (yellow card) 31'; Ledson 37'; Frøkjær-Jensen 70'	Report	Hjelde (yellow card) 25'	Stadium: Deepdale; Attendance: 7,231; Referee: Ollie Yates

== Statistics ==
=== Appearances and goals ===
As of match played 9 May 2025

Players with no appearances are not included on the list
Italics indicate a loaned in player

No.	Pos	Nat	Player	Total		Championship		FA Cup		EFL Cup		Championship Play-Offs	
No.	Pos	Nat	Player	Apps	Goals	Apps	Goals	Apps	Goals	Apps	Goals	Apps	Goals
1	GK	(England) ENG	Anthony Patterson	43	0	42+0	0	0+0	0	0+0	0	1+0	0
3	DF	(England) ENG	Dennis Cirkin	37	3	30+6	3	0+0	0	0+0	0	1+0	0
4	MF	(England) ENG	Dan Neil	46	2	44+0	2	1+0	0	0+0	0	1+0	0
5	DF	(Northern Ireland) NIR	Daniel Ballard	21	2	12+8	2	0+0	0	0+0	0	1+0	0
7	MF	(England) ENG	Jobe Bellingham	41	4	39+1	4	0+0	0	0+0	0	1+0	0
8	MF	(Republic of Ireland) IRL	Alan Browne	23	1	13+9	1	0+0	0	0+0	0	0+1	0
10	FW	(England) ENG	Patrick Roberts	46	2	38+7	2	0+0	0	0+0	0	1+0	0
11	MF	(England) ENG	Chris Rigg	45	4	36+6	4	1+0	0	1+0	0	0+1	0
12	FW	(Spain) ESP	Eliezer Mayenda	39	9	22+15	8	1+0	0	0+0	0	1+0	1
13	MF	(England) ENG	Luke O'Nien	47	3	44+1	3	1+0	0	0+0	0	1+0	0
14	FW	(England) ENG	Romaine Mundle	23	5	17+5	5	0+0	0	1+0	0	0+0	0
18	FW	(France) FRA	Wilson Isidor	44	13	34+9	12	0+0	0	0+0	0	1+0	1
20	MF	(Ghana) GHA	Salis Abdul Samed	11	0	3+7	0	0+1	0	0+0	0	0+0	0
21	GK	(England) ENG	Simon Moore	6	0	4+0	0	1+0	0	1+0	0	0+0	0
23	DF	(Netherlands) NED	Jenson Seelt	1	0	0+1	0	0+0	0	0+0	0	0+0	0
26	DF	(Wales) WAL	Chris Mepham	39	1	37+1	1	0+0	0	0+0	0	0+1	0
28	MF	(France) FRA	Enzo Le Fée	16	1	11+4	1	0+0	0	0+0	0	1+0	0
30	MF	(Serbia) SRB	Milan Aleksić	9	1	3+5	0	0+1	1	0+0	0	0+0	0
32	DF	(Northern Ireland) NIR	Trai Hume	46	3	43+1	3	1+0	0	0+0	0	1+0	0
33	DF	(Norway) NOR	Leo Hjelde	17	0	5+10	0	1+0	0	1+0	0	0+0	0
36	FW	(Colombia) COL	Ian Poveda	6	0	0+6	0	0+0	0	0+0	0	0+0	0
40	FW	(England) ENG	Tom Watson	21	2	11+9	2	0+0	0	0+1	0	0+0	0
42	DF	(England) ENG	Aji Alese	13	0	8+4	0	1+0	0	0+0	0	0+0	0
45	DF	(England) ENG	Joe Anderson	3	0	1+1	0	0+0	0	1+0	0	0+0	0
47	FW	(Belgium) BEL	Trey Samuel-Ogunsuyi	1	0	0+0	0	0+1	0	0+0	0	0+0	0
50	MF	(England) ENG	Harrison Jones	6	0	2+2	0	1+0	0	0+1	0	0+0	0
Player(s) who featured but departed the club on loan during the season:
9	FW	(Portugal) POR	Luís Semedo	1	0	0+0	0	0+0	0	0+1	0	0+0	0
15	FW	(Ukraine) UKR	Nazariy Rusyn	10	0	0+8	0	0+1	0	1+0	0	0+0	0
17	MF	(France) FRA	Abdoullah Ba	1	0	0+0	0	0+0	0	1+0	0	0+0	0
22	MF	(France) FRA	Adil Aouchiche	10	0	3+5	0	1+0	0	1+0	0	0+0	0
25	DF	(Australia) AUS	Nectarios Triantis	2	0	0+1	0	0+0	0	1+0	0	0+0	0
39	MF	(France) FRA	Pierre Ekwah	1	0	0+0	0	0+0	0	1+0	0	0+0	0
41	DF	(England) ENG	Zak Johnson	2	0	0+0	0	0+1	0	1+0	0	0+0	0
Player(s) who featured but departed the club permanently during the season:
19	FW	(Costa Rica) CRC	Jewison Bennette	1	0	0+0	0	0+0	0	0+1	0	0+0	0
20	FW	(England) ENG	Jack Clarke	2	1	2+0	1	0+0	0	0+0	0	0+0	0
24	FW	(Republic of Ireland) IRL	Aaron Connolly	11	1	2+8	1	1+0	0	0+0	0	0+0	0

=== Disciplinary record ===
As of match played 9 May 2025

Includes all competitive matches. The list is sorted by squad number when disciplinary points / points per card / number of cards are equal. Players with no cards not included in the list.

Rank	No.	Pos.	Nat.	Name	Championship			FA Cup			EFL Cup			Championship Play-Offs			Total		
Rank	No.	Pos.	Nat.	Name	Yellow card	Second yellow card	Red card	Yellow card	Second yellow card	Red card	Yellow card	Second yellow card	Red card	Yellow card	Second yellow card	Red card	Yellow card	Second yellow card	Red card
1	32	DF	(Northern Ireland)	Trai Hume	11	0	1	0	0	0	0	0	0	0	0	0	11	0	1
2=	7	MF	(England)	Jobe Bellingham	10	0	1	0	0	0	0	0	0	0	0	0	10	0	1
2=	26	DF	(Wales)	Chris Mepham	10	0	1	0	0	0	0	0	0	0	0	0	10	0	1
4=	11	MF	(England)	Chris Rigg	8	0	0	1	0	0	0	0	0	0	0	0	9	0	0
4=	18	FW	(France)	Wilson Isidor	9	0	0	0	0	0	0	0	0	0	0	0	9	0	0
6=	10	FW	(England)	Patrick Roberts	8	0	0	0	0	0	0	0	0	0	0	0	8	0	0
6=	13	MF	(England)	Luke O'Nien	8	0	0	0	0	0	0	0	0	0	0	0	8	0	0
8	3	DF	(England)	Dennis Cirkin	7	0	0	0	0	0	0	0	0	0	0	0	7	0	0
9	4	MF	(Northern Ireland)	Dan Neil	3	1	0	0	0	0	0	0	0	0	0	0	3	1	0
10	33	DF	(Norway)	Leo Hjelde	3	0	0	0	0	0	1	0	0	0	0	0	4	0	0
11=	1	GK	(England)	Anthony Patterson	3	0	0	0	0	0	0	0	0	0	0	0	3	0	0
11=	5	DF	(Northern Ireland)	Daniel Ballard	3	0	0	0	0	0	0	0	0	0	0	0	3	0	0
13=	12	FW	(Spain)	Eliezer Mayenda	2	0	0	0	0	0	0	0	0	0	0	0	2	0	0
13=	28	MF	(France)	Enzo Le Fée	2	0	0	0	0	0	0	0	0	0	0	0	2	0	0
13=	36	MF	(Colombia)	Ian Poveda	2	0	0	0	0	0	0	0	0	0	0	0	2	0	0
13=	40	FW	(England)	Tom Watson	2	0	0	0	0	0	0	0	0	0	0	0	2	0	0
13=	42	DF	(England)	Aji Alese	2	0	0	0	0	0	0	0	0	0	0	0	2	0	0
18=
18=	8	MF	(Republic of Ireland)	Alan Browne	1	0	0	0	0	0	0	0	0	0	0	0	1	0	0
18=	14	FW	(England)	Romaine Mundle	1	0	0	0	0	0	0	0	0	0	0	0	1	0	0
18=	15	FW	(Ukraine)	Nazariy Rusyn	1	0	0	0	0	0	0	0	0	0	0	0	1	0	0
18=	21	GK	(England)	Simon Moore	1	0	0	0	0	0	0	0	0	0	0	0	1	0	0
18=	30	MF	(Serbia)	Milan Aleksić	1	0	0	0	0	0	0	0	0	0	0	0	1	0	0
18=	45	DF	(England)	Joe Anderson	1	0	0	0	0	0	0	0	0	0	0	0	1	0	0
18=	50	MF	(England)	Harrison Jones	1	0	0	0	0	0	0	0	0	0	0	0	1	0	0
Total					100	1	3	1	0	0	1	0	0	1	0	0	103	1	3
