= Luke O'Nien =

English footballer (born 1994)

- O'Nien in 2026

Personal information
- Full name: Luke Terry O'Nien
- Date of birth: 21 November 1994 (age 32)
- Place of birth: Hemel Hempstead, England
- Height: 5 ft 9 in (1.74 m)
- Positions: Defensive midfielder; centre-back; utility player

Team information
- Current team: Sunderland
- Number: 13

Youth career
- 2003–2013: Watford

Senior career*
Years	Team	Apps	(Gls)
2013–2015	Watford	1	(0)
2014	→ Wealdstone (loan)	5	(0)
2014–2015	→ Wealdstone (loan)	31	(4)
2015–2018	Wycombe Wanderers	101	(15)
2018–	Sunderland	280	(21)
- * Club domestic league appearances and goals as of 18:16, 8 November 2026 (UTC)

Luke Terry O'Nien (born 21 November 1994) is an English professional footballer who plays as a defensive midfielder or defender for Premier League club Sunderland.

== Career ==
=== Watford ===
O'Nien joined Watford as an Under-9. Having signed his first professional contract at Vicarage Road in July 2013, he was then called up by the first team to the pre-season friendly tour in Italy after he impressed staff during training. O'Nien was then given the number 32 shirt. He had been an unused substitute on a handful of occasions during the 2013–14 season. He made his Watford debut as an 88th-minute substitute in a 3–0 win at home to Barnsley on 15 March 2014. After the match, O'Nien reacted to his debut against Barnsley, saying 'It was fantastic to get out there, that's what you work towards, and I'll keep on practising'.

==== Wealdstone (loan) ====
On 27 March 2014, O'Nien signed a one-month loan deal with Isthmian League Premier Division side Wealdstone. He made his debut as a late substitute in a win over Billericay Town on 31 March 2014, while his first start came three days later on 3 April 2014 in a 3–0 success over East Thurrock United. He ended the season gaining a Ryman Premier Division title medal as Wealdstone won the league. Following his loan spell, on 13 May 2014, O'Nien signed a new one-year deal with the Hornets. He expressed delight over signing a new contract with the club.

In August 2014, O'Nien returned to Wealdstone, now a Conference South side, on a season-long loan deal. Following Watford's promotion to the Premier League in 2015, O'Nien was one of three released by the club following the expiration of his contract.

=== Wycombe Wanderers ===
On 25 July 2015, O'Nien signed for League Two side Wycombe Wanderers on a one-year deal, having had a successful trial with the club. He scored the first professional goal of his career on 3 October 2015, as Wycombe took the lead after just 70 seconds, in a 3–2 defeat at home to Northampton. Following the match, O'Nien thanked his former manager at Wealdstone, Gordon Bartlett, and said 'I would recommend a move to that level for any youngster trying to make it in the Football League. It is a good platform to learn and to build from.' In 2017, he earned the accolade of Community Player of the Season. In the 2017–18 season, the club won promotion to League One, after defeating Chesterfield 2–1 to secure the final automatic promotion place.

=== Sunderland ===
O'Nien joined Sunderland on 30 July 2018. He scored his first goal for the club in a 2–0 win away to Shrewsbury Town on 20 October 2018. His second goal for the club came on 27 November 2018, and it was Sunderland's fourth, and final, goal of an entertaining 4–2 home victory against promotion rivals Barnsley.

In March 2019, O'Nien had consistent performances in an unfamiliar right back role in which he won multiple man of the match awards. At the end of the 2018–19 season, O'Nien picked up the Young Player of The Year award. In the 2019 League One play-off semi-final second leg, O'Nien was attacked by a Portsmouth fan at Fratton Park after he was accidentally pushed into the stands by a player on the opposing team. O'Nien appeared to get punched, kicked and hurled abuse at by nearby Portsmouth fans. However, O'Nien was not injured and declined to press charges, saying after the match that it was 'just a bit of handbags'.

Following an impressive 2020–21 season, O'Nien was named in the 2020–21 EFL League One Team of the Season at the league's annual awards ceremony on 29 April 2021. On 6 July 2021, O'Nien signed a new three-year contract extension with Sunderland. Ahead of the 2024–25 season, O'Nien was named as Sunderland's club captain. In the opening weekend of the new season, he scored against Cardiff City for his first goal of the campaign. O'Nien found the net again the following week, along with bagging an assist, making it three goal contributions in two games. He scored an own goal while attempting to turn his head to dodge the ball while facing Portsmouth on Matchday 4. This own goal ended Sunderland's 389-minute run without conceding a goal.

On 24 May 2025, Sunderland ended their eight-year wait to return to the Premier League after beating Sheffield United 2–1 with an injury-time winner in the Championship play-off final. O'Nien, who had to watch the rest of the match from the sidelines after dislocating his shoulder during the game, joked that he 'covered more distance celebrating'. After the match, he told Sky Sports that he had 'never had anxiety like it', but that he was 'so proud of these boys'.

On 14 August 2025, O'Nien signed a new two-year contract, with a club option of a further year. On 3 December 2025, O'Nien made his Premier League debut in a 1–1 draw against Liverpool at Anfield, replacing goalscorer Chemsdine Talbi.

== Personal life ==
O'Nien was born in Hemel Hempstead, Hertfordshire. He attended John F Kennedy Catholic School. His father Terry was a professional golfer. Owing to his ancestry, O'Nien is eligible to play international football for either the England or Singapore national teams. His great-uncle is Lim Kim San, a prominent local politician who played a role in the development of Singapore, particularly in the country's prominent public housing projects. O'Nien is married to wife Georgia and has two children, a boy and a girl.

== Career statistics ==
As of match played 31 October 2026

Appearances and goals by club, season, and competition
Club	Season	League			FA Cup		EFL Cup		Europe		Other		Total	
Club	Season	Division	Apps	Goals	Apps	Goals	Apps	Goals	Apps	Goals	Apps	Goals	Apps	Goals
Watford	2013–14	Championship	1	0	0	0	0	0	—		—		1	0
Wealdstone (loan)	2013–14	Isthmian League Premier Division	5	0	—		—		—		—		5	0
Wealdstone (loan)	2014–15	Conference South	31	4	0	0	—		—		2 (Note: Appearances in FA Trophy)	0	33	4
Wealdstone (loan)	Total		36	4	0	0	—		—		2	0	38	4
Wycombe Wanderers	2015–16	League Two	35	5	4	0	0	0	—		1 (Note: Appearances in Football League/EFL Trophy)	0	40	5
Wycombe Wanderers	2016–17	League Two	31	3	4	0	0	0	—		4	0	39	3
Wycombe Wanderers	2017–18	League Two	35	7	2	1	0	0	—		3	0	40	8
Wycombe Wanderers	Total		101	15	10	1	0	0	—		8	0	119	16
Sunderland	2018–19	League One	37	5	3	0	1	0	—		11 (Note: Eight appearances in EFL Trophy, three appearances in League One play-offs)	0	52	5
Sunderland	2019–20	League One	35	4	2	0	4	0	—		2	0	43	4
Sunderland	2020–21	League One	38	2	0	0	1	0	—		6 (Note: Four appearances in EFL Trophy, two appearances in League One play-offs)	0	45	2
Sunderland	2021–22	League One	26	3	1	0	3	1	—		5 (Note: Two appearances in EFL Trophy, three appearances in League One play-offs)	0	35	4
Sunderland	2022–23	Championship	41	2	2	1	1	0	—		2 (Note: Appearances in EFL Championship play-offs)	0	46	3
Sunderland	2023–24	Championship	43	2	1	0	0	0	—		—		44	2
Sunderland	2024–25	Championship	44	3	1	0	0	0	—		3	0	48	3
Sunderland	2025–26	Premier League	12	0	3	0	0	0	—		—		15	0
Sunderland	2026–27	Premier League	3	0	0	0	2	0	2 (Note: Appearances in UEFA Europa League)	0	—		7	0
Sunderland	Total		279	21	13	1	12	1	2	0	29	0	335	23
Career total			417	40	23	2	12	1	2	0	39	0	493	43

== Honours ==
Sunderland

- EFL Championship play-offs: 2025
- EFL League One play-offs: 2022
- EFL Trophy: 2020–21; runner-up: 2018–19

Individual

- EFL League One Team of the Season: 2020–21
- University of Sunderland: Honorary Doctorate
