= Anthony Patterson =

English footballer

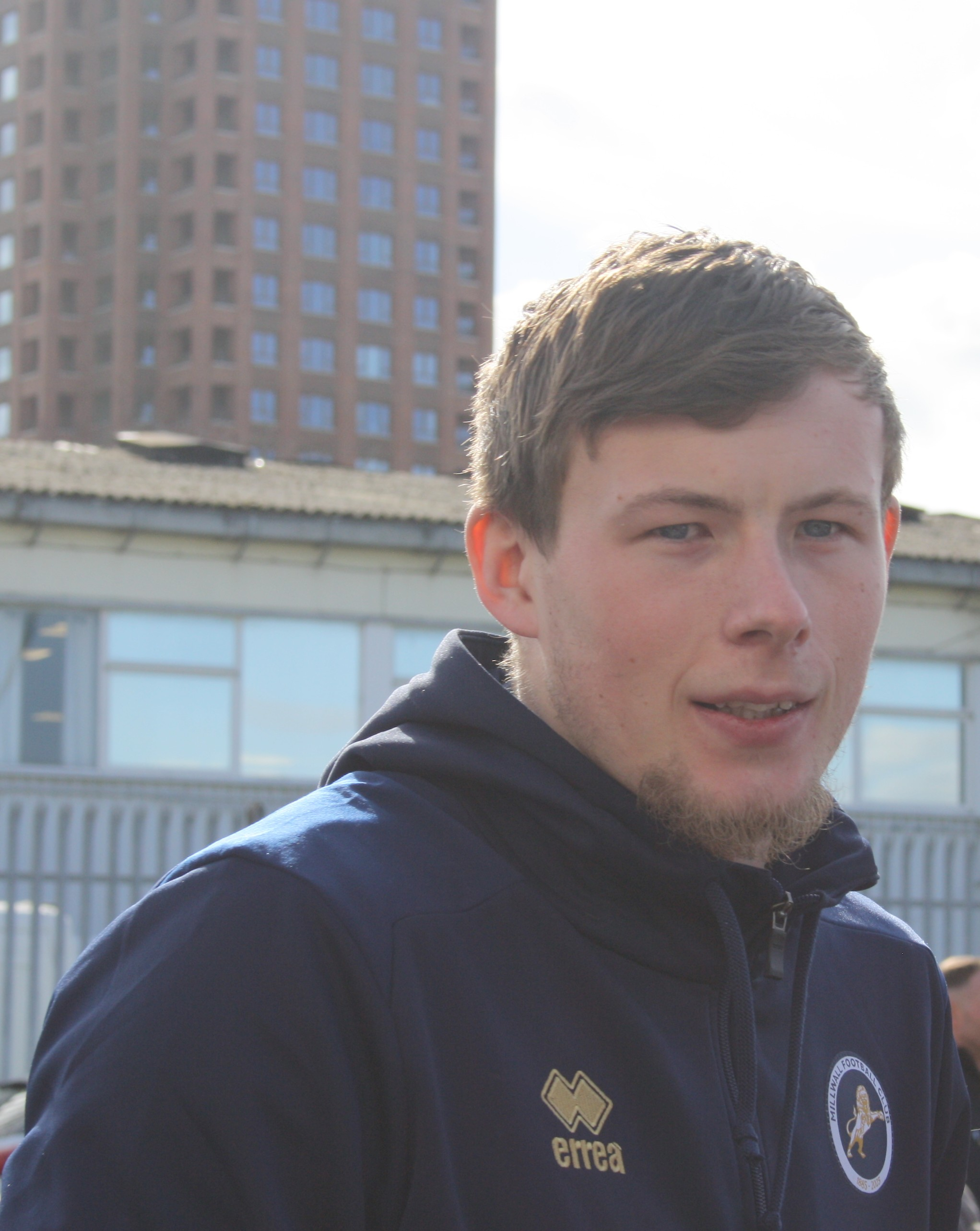
- Patterson in 2026

Personal information
- Full name: Anthony William Patterson
- Date of birth: 10 May 2000 (age 26)
- Place of birth: North Shields, England
- Height: 6 ft 2 in (1.89 m)
- Position: Goalkeeper

Team information
- Current team: Wrexham
- Number: 22

Youth career
- 2013–2018: Sunderland

Senior career*
Years	Team	Apps	(Gls)
2018–2026	Sunderland	153	(0)
2021–2022	→ Notts County (loan)	9	(0)
2026	→ Millwall (loan)	14	(0)
2026–	Wrexham	6	(0)

International career
2023–2024	England U21	1	(0)
- * Club domestic league appearances and goals as of 17:40, 10 September 2026 (UTC)

Anthony William Patterson (born 10 May 2000) is an English professional footballer who plays as a goalkeeper for EFL Championship club Wrexham. He has represented England U21 internationally.

== Career ==
=== Sunderland ===
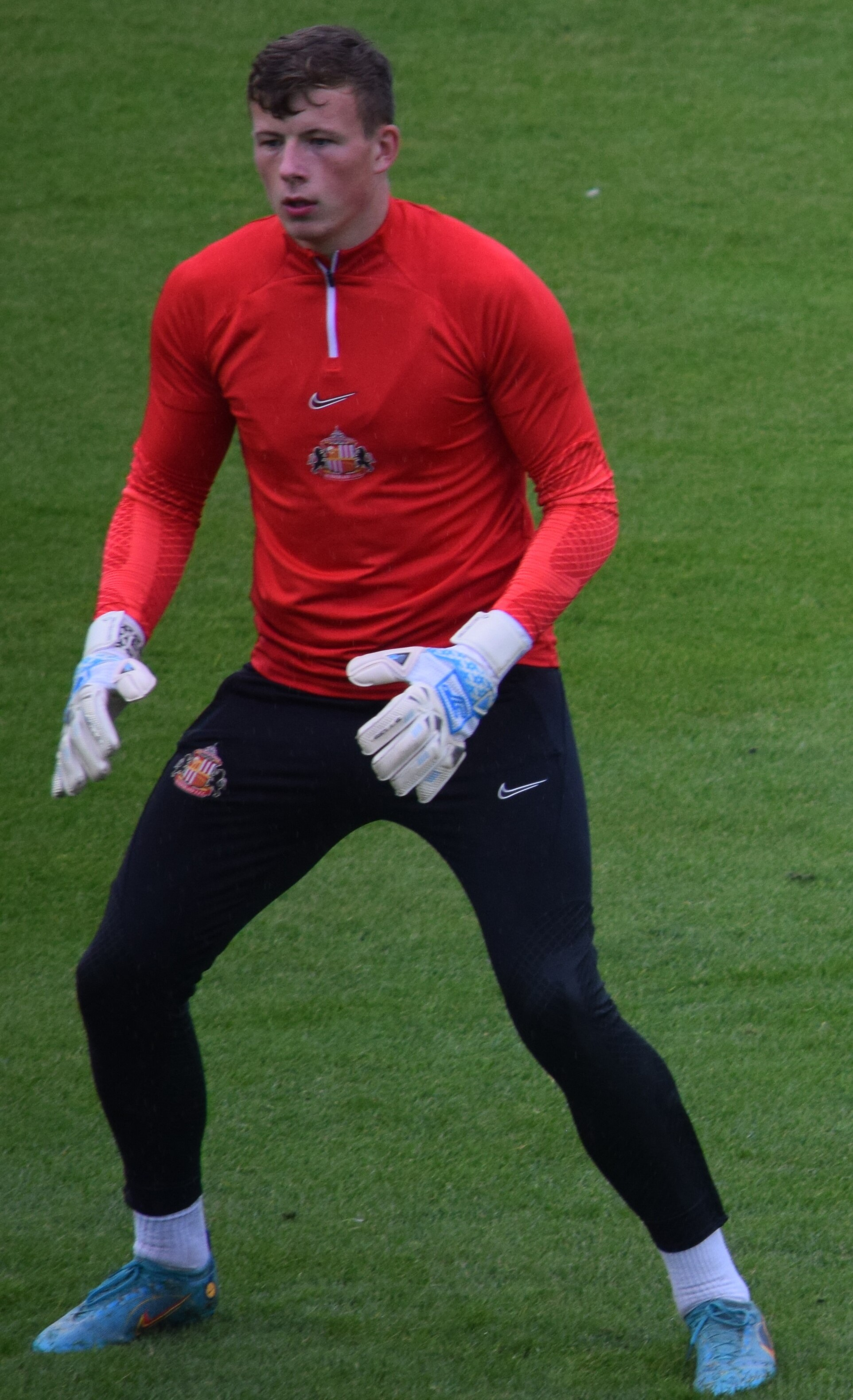
Patterson warming up for Sunderland in 2022.

Patterson sat on the bench during the 2018–19 season and was given a contract in July 2019. He made his competitive first-team debut on 10 November 2020, in a 2–1 defeat at Fleetwood Town in an EFL Trophy group stage fixture. He made one further appearance in the 2021–22 season and having impressed head coach Lee Johnson, Patterson signed a new two-year deal, with the option of an additional year, in June 2021. Sporting Director Kristjaan Speakman said that he now considered Patterson "as a member of the first-team squad" with Lee Burge as the only other senior goalkeeper at the Stadium of Light.

==== Notts County (loan) ====
In September 2021, Patterson joined Notts County on loan until the end of October after Sunderland completed the signing of Ron-Thorben Hoffmann on loan from Bayern Munich on deadline day.

==== Return to Sunderland ====
His loan was extended until the end of January. However, Lee Johnson recalled the goalkeeper due to injury to Sunderland's second choice goalkeeper Lee Burge. On 31 December, Lee Johnson sent Patterson back to Notts County until end of the season. On 7 January, Patterson was recalled from Notts County with the possibility of the loan being resumed later in the window. Patterson established himself as Sunderland's first-choice goalkeeper for the second half of the season, featuring in Sunderland's successful play-off campaign as they defeated Wycombe Wanderers 2–0 in the final.

Patterson signed a new long-term contract with the club in June 2022, keeping him at the club until 2026.

Patterson would feature again in a play-off final, this time in the 2025 EFL Championship play-off final against Sheffield United that helped Sunderland secure the third and final qualifying spot for subsequent promotion to the 2025–26 Premier League. In this match, he made two key saves (1', 69'), the second a critical save in the context of the match, as Sunderland were down 0–1 at the time. Sunderland would go on to score an equalizer soon thereafter, and eventually win the match 2–1.

==== Millwall (loan) ====
Having been limited to just one appearance in the EFL Cup across the first-half of the season due to the excellent form of Robin Roefs, Patterson returned to the Championship on 1 February 2026, joining Millwall on loan for the remainder of the season.

=== Wrexham ===
Patterson signed a four-year contract with Wrexham on 11 August 2026.

== International career ==
On 10 June 2023, Patterson made his England U21 debut as a half-time substitute during a 2–0 defeat to Japan at St. George's Park.

== Style of play ==
Sunderland goalkeeper coach Lee Butler said that Patterson had great saving, handling and shot-stopping ability, with his areas of development being coming for crosses, his distribution and his communication.

== Career statistics ==
As of match played 11 May 2026

Appearances and goals by club, season and competition
Club	Season	League			FA Cup		EFL Cup		Other		Total	
Club	Season	Division	Apps	Goals	Apps	Goals	Apps	Goals	Apps	Goals	Apps	Goals
Sunderland	2018–19	League One	0	0	0	0	0	0	0	0	0	0
Sunderland	2019–20	League One	0	0	0	0	0	0	0	0	0	0
Sunderland	2020–21	League One	0	0	0	0	0	0	2 (Note: Appearances in EFL Trophy)	0	2	0
Sunderland	2021–22	League One	20	0	0	0	2	0	3 (Note: Appearances in League One play-offs)	0	25	0
Sunderland	2022–23	Championship	46	0	2	0	0	0	2 (Note: Appearances in EFL Championship play-offs)	0	50	0
Sunderland	2023–24	Championship	45	0	1	0	0	0	0	0	46	0
Sunderland	2024–25	Championship	42	0	0	0	0	0	3	0	45	0
Sunderland	2025–26	Premier League	0	0	0	0	1	0	—		1	0
Sunderland	Total		153	0	3	0	3	0	10	0	169	0
Notts County (loan)	2021–22	National League	9	0	4	0	—		0	0	13	0
Millwall (loan)	2025–26	Championship	14	0	—		—		2	0	16	0
Wrexham	2026–27	Championship	0	0	0	0	—		—		0	0
Career total			165	0	7	0	3	0	12	0	187	0

== Honours ==
Sunderland

- EFL League One play-offs: 2022
- EFL Championship play-offs: 2025

Individual

- North East Football Writers' Association Young Player of the Year: 2022
