= Jobe Bellingham =

English footballer (born 2005)

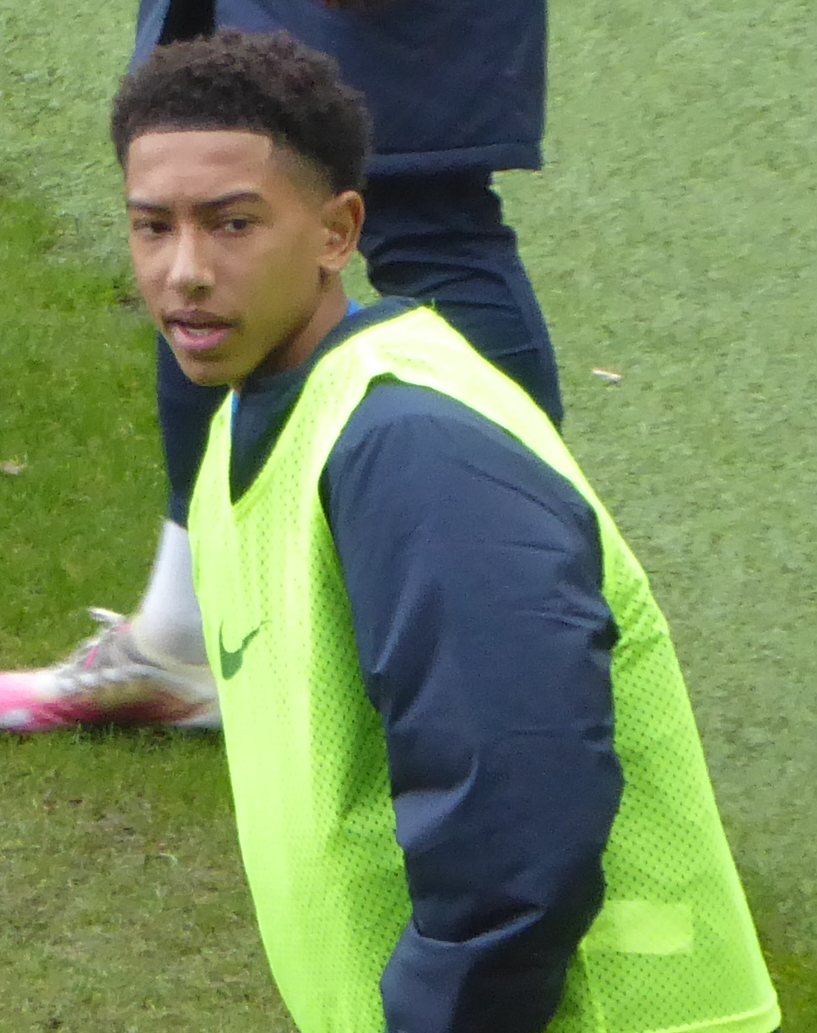
- Bellingham in 2022

Personal information
- Full name: Jobe Samuel Patrick Bellingham
- Date of birth: 23 September 2005 (age 21)
- Place of birth: Stourbridge, England
- Height: 6 ft 3 in (1.91 m)
- Positions: Midfielder; forward

Team information
- Current team: Borussia Dortmund
- Number: 7

Youth career
- 2010–2021: Birmingham City

Senior career*
Years	Team	Apps	(Gls)
2021–2023	Birmingham City	24	(0)
2023–2025	Sunderland	85	(11)
2025–	Borussia Dortmund	41	(0)

International career^{‡}
2021	England U16	1	(0)
2021–2022	England U17	8	(0)
2022–2023	England U18	10	(2)
2023–2024	England U19 (Note: Bellingham's half-time replacement of Kane Taylor against Wales on 14 October 2023 is omitted by the England team website match report.)	5	(0)
2024	England U20	3	(0)
2024–	England U21	12	(1)
- * Club domestic league appearances and goals as of 20:30, 7 November 2026 (UTC) ‡ National team caps and goals as of 25 September 2026

Jobe Samuel Patrick Bellingham (born 23 September 2005) is an English professional footballer who plays as a midfielder or forward for Bundesliga club Borussia Dortmund and the England national team. He has represented England at all youth levels and served as the under-21 captain from 2024 to 2026.

Bellingham began his career in Birmingham City's academy, and made his first-team debut as a 16-year-old for the club. After making 24 league appearances for the side, he joined fellow EFL Championship club Sunderland in 2023. After gaining a promotion with the team to the Premier League in 2025, Bellingham made a permanent transfer to Germany's Borussia Dortmund for the highest transfer fee a newly promoted Premier League club had ever received.

== Early and personal life ==
Jobe Bellingham was born in Stourbridge, West Midlands, on 23 September 2005, the younger son of Denise and Mark Bellingham. He is of Irish descent through his father and Jamaican descent through his mother Denise. Mark worked as a sergeant in the West Midlands Police and was a prolific goalscorer in non-League football. Bellingham is the younger brother of Real Madrid and England international footballer Jude Bellingham, who preceded him into Birmingham City's academy where both were to spend their formative years. The 16-year-old Jude was a first-team regular during the 2019–20 season before signing for Borussia Dortmund. After Jude's departure, Jobe featured in Birmingham's 2020–21 season kit unveiling.

== Club career ==
=== Birmingham City ===
At the age of 15 years, 321 days, Bellingham was named on the substitutes' bench for Birmingham's 2021–22 EFL Cup first-round match at home to Colchester United of League One. He remained unused, as he did in the second round of the same competition. Had he made a debut in either match, still a few weeks short of his 16th birthday, he would have become the club's youngest ever first-team player, breaking the record set by his brother in the first round two years earlier. Later that year, rumours linked Jude Bellingham with a return to England; counter-rumours linked Jude's club, Borussia Dortmund, with interest in signing Jobe. By the end of the year he had four goals from nine appearances for Birmingham's under-18 team in their section of the Under-18 Premier League, and had played four times for their under-23s in Premier League 2 Division 2.

Bellingham was named on the bench for the EFL Championship match against Coventry City in November. Manager Lee Bowyer insisted that observers should not judge him by his brother's achievements, pointing out that he was "next in line" because of the number of injuries among the club's midfielders. He again remained unused. He made his senior debut as a second-half substitute in Birmingham's 2021–22 FA Cup third-round match at home to League One club Plymouth Argyle, replacing the 17-year-old Jordan James after 70 minutes with the score goalless and Birmingham reduced to ten men. At 16 years, 107 days, he became Birmingham's second youngest debutant. After the match, which Birmingham lost 1–0, Bowyer said he had earned his debut by the improvement in his game over the previous few weeks training with the first team. He made his first appearance in the Football League a week later as a late substitute in a 1–1 draw away to Preston North End. His next was not until the final match of the season.

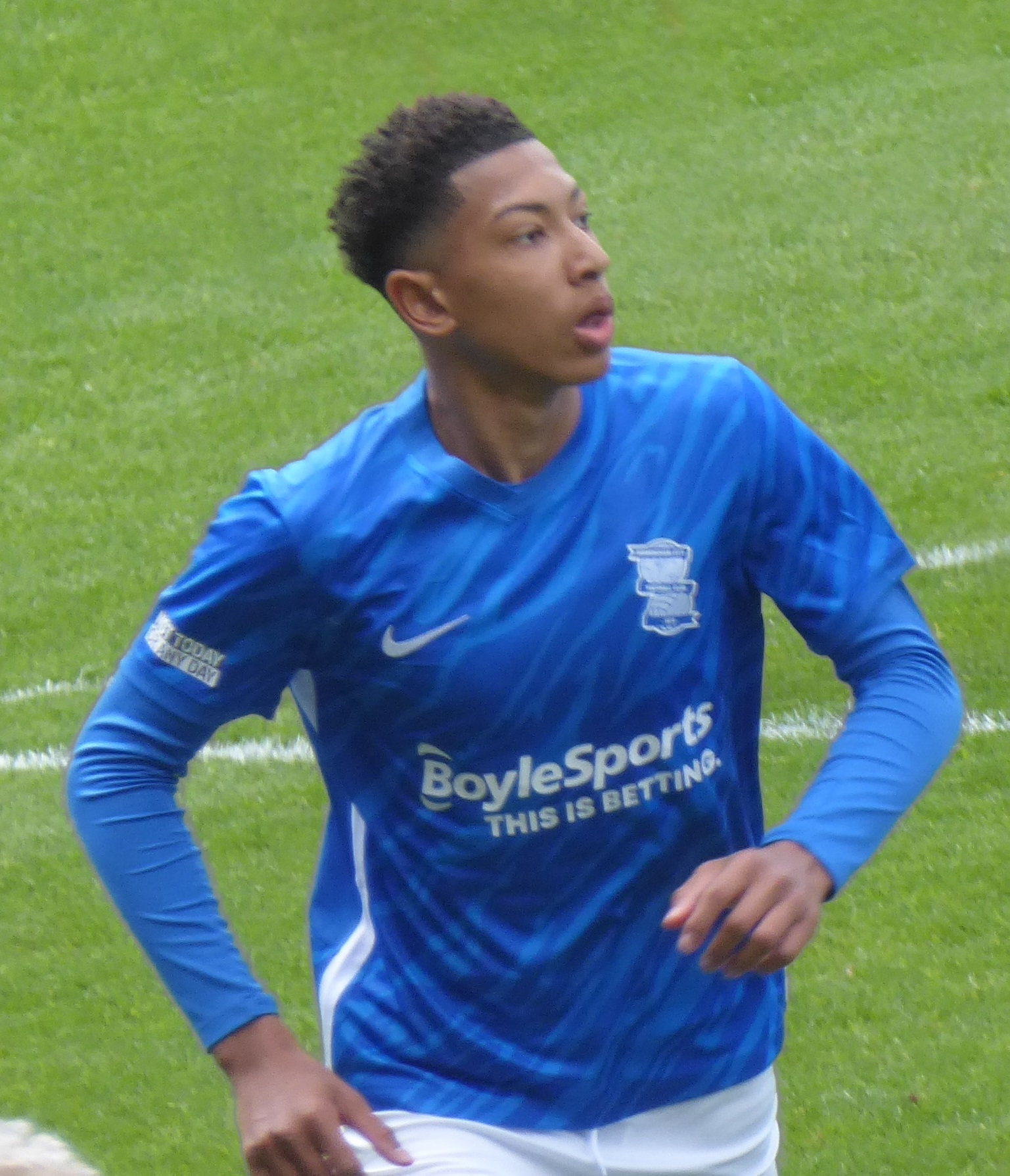
Bellingham with Birmingham City in 2022

In July 2022, Birmingham confirmed that Bellingham would be taking up a scholarship with the club and had agreed terms on a first professional contract, to take effect on his 17th birthday. Under head coach John Eustace, his introduction to Championship football was gradual. He made occasional substitute appearances in the first couple of months of the season, was used regularly from the bench in October, and made his first start on 11 November, playing the first hour of a 2–1 defeat at home to Sunderland. The Birmingham Mail's mid-season assessment highlighted the trust placed in him to "[see] out some very nervy end-of-game situations", while pointing out that the Sunderland match "suggested he still has a way to go to be ready for the step up. Which is fine, he's 17." Eustace was insistent that there was "no rush" to get Bellingham into the starting eleven – the team had several other young central midfielders in Manchester United loanee Hannibal Mejbri and the home-grown George Hall and Jordan James.

A stomach muscle strained in January 2023 kept Bellingham out for three months. During his absence, he added muscle and physicality to go with his increased height. At home to Stoke City on 10 April, he came close to winning the game with what would have been his first senior goal when his stoppage-time volley was blocked. A few days later, Bellingham started the match away to Millwall that Birmingham won to secure their Championship status, "was composed on the ball, intelligent without it and, in the words of Eustace, 'showed great maturity'." He finished the season with 22 league appearances, of which five were starts.

=== Sunderland ===
Rumours of a possible move to Sunderland strengthened after Bellingham attended their play-off semi-final against Luton Town. The club's sporting director Kristjaan Speakman, first-team coach Mike Dodds, and head of coaching Stuart English had all been at Birmingham when the Bellingham brothers were coming through the academy, and were credited with a major role in the development of both. On 14 June 2023, Bellingham joined Sunderland for an undisclosed fee.

Bellingham made his debut for Sunderland on 6 August 2023, starting the team's opening match of the season against Ipswich Town. He chose to use his given name on the back of his shirt rather than the conventional surname; manager Tony Mowbray thought "he's trying to create his own identity. He doesn't want to live off the back of his brother's name; he wants to be the footballer that he is and show people what he can do." On 19 August, he scored his first two professional goals in Sunderland's 2–1 victory against Rotherham United at the Stadium of Light. On 11 November, he scored the opening goal of Sunderland's 3–1 win over his former club Birmingham City.

Bellingham signed a new deal with Sunderland in August 2024 which extended his contract to the end of the 2027–28 season. He told the club website at the time that he was "buzzing to sign [the] contract and extend [his] stay at Sunderland". On 2 November, Bellingham received the first red card of his career in a goalless draw against QPR. On 27 April 2025, he was named EFL Championship Young Player of the Season. Bellingham started in the 2025 EFL Championship play-off final, which saw Sunderland end their eight-year wait to return to the Premier League, with a 2–1 victory against Sheffield United.

=== Borussia Dortmund ===
On 10 June 2025, Bellingham signed a five-year contract with Bundesliga club Borussia Dortmund, the same team his brother Jude played for three years, for a reported fee of £27.8 million (plus £4.2 million in add-ons). The transfer fee also made Bellingham the second most expensive signing in Dortmund's history excluding add-ons behind Ousmane Dembélé. A week later, on 17 June, he made his debut in a goalless draw against Fluminense during the FIFA Club World Cup. Bellingham scored his first goal for Dortmund in his first start, during a 4–3 Club World Cup victory against Mamelodi Sundowns on 21 June. Bellingham switched his shirt number to 7 ahead of the 2025–26 Bundesliga, from the 77 he wore at the FIFA Club World Cup.

== International career ==
Bellingham was born in England, and is reported to be also eligible to represent Ireland via a paternal grandparent. He made his debut for England under-16s on 3 June 2021, starting a 6–0 friendly win against Northern Ireland. He made his first appearance at under-17 level three months later in the Syrenka Cup tournament against Romania; he marked the occasion by missing a penalty, but England still won 2–0. He also played in the other group match and in the final, which England lost 3–2 to the Netherlands. In October, he played in all three of England's 2022 European Under-17 Championship qualifying round matches, and provided an assist for Kobbie Mainoo's goal in a 7–0 win against Armenia, as England topped their group and progressed to the elite round.

After eight appearances for the under-17s, Bellingham was included in the England under-18 squad for a four-team mini-tournament at the Pinatar Arena in Spain in September 2022. He started against the Netherlands and Belgium and was a late substitute against the Faroe Islands as England won all three matches. In March 2023, Bellingham played in all three matches of the under-18s' tour of Croatia. Against the hosts, he came on after an hour, scored an equaliser, and England went on to win 2–1. He started and captained the side in the other two matches. His shot was blocked for a penalty that would have tied the scores against Belgium – he took the kick but missed, and Belgium won 3–0 – and he scored the last goal of a 3–1 win against Switzerland.

Bellingham made his England under-19 debut and captained the side for a 1–0 defeat to Germany in Oliva, Spain on 6 September 2023. He played in the second match of that training camp, and took part in all three of England's European Championship qualifying round matches in October. All three were drawn, and England failed to qualify. On 7 June 2024, Bellingham made his first appearance for the England Elite League Squad (formerly known as England U20); he played the first 65 minutes of a friendly against Sweden at Stadion ŠRC Sesvete which England won 2–1. On 15 November 2024, Bellingham made his U21 debut during a goalless draw with Spain in Cádiz.

On 6 November 2026, Bellingham was selected as part of the 25-man squad for the England national team, for the 2026–27 Nations League.

== Career statistics ==
=== Club ===
As of match played 7 November 2026

Appearances and goals by club, season and competition
Club	Season	League			National cup (Note: Includes FA Cup, DFB-Pokal)		League cup (Note: Includes EFL Cup)		Europe		Other		Total	
Club	Season	Division	Apps	Goals	Apps	Goals	Apps	Goals	Apps	Goals	Apps	Goals	Apps	Goals
Birmingham City	2021–22	Championship	2	0	1	0	0	0	—		—		3	0
Birmingham City	2022–23	Championship	22	0	0	0	1	0	—		—		23	0
Birmingham City	Total		24	0	1	0	1	0	—		—		26	0
Sunderland	2023–24	Championship	45	7	1	0	1	0	—		—		47	7
Sunderland	2024–25	Championship	40	4	0	0	0	0	—		3 (Note: Appearances in Championship play-offs)	0	43	4
Sunderland	Total		85	11	1	0	1	0	—		3	0	90	11
Borussia Dortmund	2024–25	Bundesliga	—		—		—		—		4 (Note: Appearances in FIFA Club World Cup)	1	4	1
Borussia Dortmund	2025–26	Bundesliga	32	0	3	0	—		10 (Note: Appearances in UEFA Champions League)	0	—		45	0
Borussia Dortmund	2026–27	Bundesliga	9	0	1	0	—		4	0	1 (Note: Appearance in Franz Beckenbauer Supercup)	0	15	0
Borussia Dortmund	Total		41	0	4	0	—		14	0	5	1	64	1
Career total			150	11	6	0	2	0	14	0	8	1	180	12

== Honours ==
Sunderland

- EFL Championship play-offs: 2025

Individual

- EFL Championship Team of the Season: 2024–25
- EFL Championship Young Player of the Season: 2024–25
