= Dan Neil (footballer) =

English footballer (born 2001)

Personal information
- Full name: Daniel James Neil
- Date of birth: 13 December 2001 (age 24)
- Place of birth: South Shields, England
- Height: 5 ft 10 in (1.78 m)
- Position: Defensive midfielder

Team information
- Current team: Rangers
- Number: 6

Youth career
- Hebburn Town
- 2010–2018: Sunderland

Senior career*
| Years | Team | Apps | (Gls) |
| 2018–2026 | Sunderland | 175 | (11) |
| 2026 | → Ipswich Town (loan) | 16 | (0) |
| 2026– | Rangers | 11 | (1) |

International career
| 2021–2022 | England U20 | 3 | (0) |
- * Club domestic league appearances and goals as of 08:51, 22 November 2026 (UTC)

Daniel James Neil (born 13 December 2001) is an English professional footballer who plays as a defensive midfielder for Scottish Premiership club Rangers.

== Club career ==
Born in South Shields, Neil grew up as a Sunderland fan, and began his career with the club after a stint with Hebburn Town Juniors.

He made his senior debut on 13 November 2018, in the EFL Trophy, appearing as a late substitute in injury time. Neil scored his first professional goal when he scored against Accrington Stanley on 11 September 2021 in a 2–1 win.

In December 2021 and January 2022 he was linked with possible transfers to Premier League clubs Burnley and Aston Villa, however he remained with Sunderland. This speculation came on the back of Neil being awarded the EFL Young Player of the Month award for December 2021.

On 27 January 2026, Neil joined EFL Championship club Ipswich Town on loan until the end of the season, when he would become a free agent.

On 1 July 2026, Neil signed for Rangers on a three-year contract. On 13 September 2026, Neil scored his first goals for Rangers, scoring two goals in a 3–0 victory against Celtic in the quarter finals of the League Cup. In that match he served as captain in the absence of the injured Lawrence Shankland, and was compared by Peter Lovenkrands to former player Barry Ferguson for his performance. After making an error in a league match, he was defended by teammate Ivor Pandur.

== International career ==
On 11 November 2021, Neil made his England U20 debut during a 2–0 defeat to Portugal in the 2021–22 Under 20 Elite League.

== Career statistics ==
As of match played 21 November 2026

Appearances and goals by club, season and competition
| Club | Season | League | | | National Cup (Note: Includes FA Cup, Scottish Cup) | | League Cup (Note: Includes EFL Cup, Scottish League Cup) | | Other | | Total | |
| Club | Season | Division | Apps | Goals | Apps | Goals | Apps | Goals | Apps | Goals | Apps | Goals |
|---|---|---|---|---|---|---|---|---|---|---|---|---|
| Sunderland | 2018–19 | League One | 0 | 0 | 0 | 0 | 0 | 0 | 1 (Note: Appearance(s) in the EFL Trophy) | 0 | 1 | 0 |
| Sunderland | 2019–20 | League One | 0 | 0 | 0 | 0 | 0 | 0 | — | | 0 | 0 |
| Sunderland | 2020–21 | League One | 2 | 0 | 0 | 0 | 0 | 0 | 6 | 0 | 8 | 0 |
| Sunderland | 2021–22 | League One | 39 | 3 | 1 | 0 | 5 | 0 | 1 | 1 | 46 | 4 |
| Sunderland | 2022–23 | Championship | 45 | 2 | 3 | 0 | 0 | 0 | 2 (Note: Appearances in the EFL Championship play-offs) | 0 | 50 | 2 |
| Sunderland | 2023–24 | Championship | 42 | 4 | 1 | 0 | 1 | 0 | — | | 44 | 4 |
| Sunderland | 2024–25 | Championship | 44 | 2 | 1 | 0 | 0 | 0 | 3 | 0 | 48 | 2 |
| Sunderland | 2025–26 | Premier League | 3 | 0 | 0 | 0 | 1 | 0 | — | | 4 | 0 |
| Sunderland | Total | | 175 | 11 | 6 | 0 | 7 | 0 | 13 | 1 | 201 | 12 |
| Ipswich Town (loan) | 2025–26 | Championship | 16 | 0 | 1 | 0 | — | | — | | 17 | 0 |
| Rangers | 2026–27 | Scottish Premiership | 11 | 1 | 0 | 0 | 3 | 2 | 4 (Note: Appearances in the UEFA Europa League) | 0 | 18 | 3 |
| Career total | | | 202 | 12 | 7 | 0 | 10 | 2 | 17 | 1 | 236 | 15 |

== Honours ==
Sunderland

- EFL Trophy: 2020–21
- EFL League One play-offs: 2022
- EFL Championship play-offs: 2025

Ipswich Town

- EFL Championship runner-up: 2025–26

Individual

- EFL Young Player of the Month: December 2021
