= Chris Mepham =

Wales international footballer (born 1997)

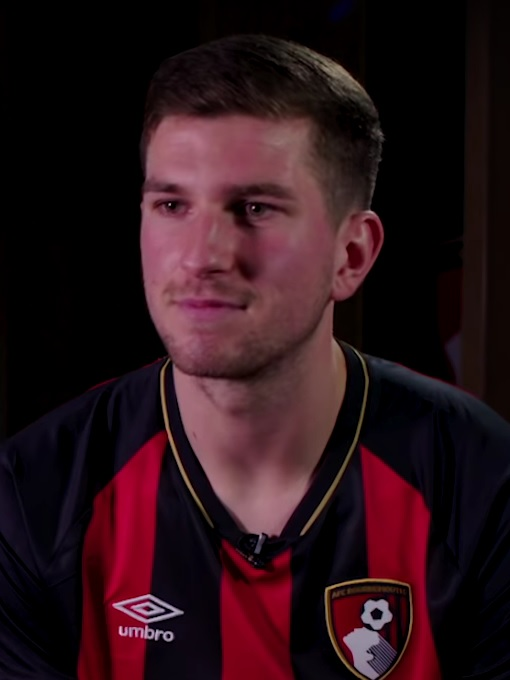
- Mepham with AFC Bournemouth in 2019

Personal information
- Full name: Christopher James Mepham
- Date of birth: 5 November 1997 (age 29)
- Place of birth: Harrow, England
- Height: 1.93 m (6 ft 4 in)
- Position: Centre-back

Team information
- Current team: West Bromwich Albion
- Number: 2

Youth career
- 2008–2012: Chelsea
- 2012–2016: Brentford

Senior career*
Years	Team	Apps	(Gls)
2016–2019	Brentford	43	(1)
2019–2025	Bournemouth	108	(2)
2024–2025	→ Sunderland (loan)	38	(1)
2025–	West Bromwich Albion	28	(1)

International career^{‡}
2017	Wales U20	1	(0)
2017	Wales U21	4	(0)
2018–	Wales	57	(0)
- * Club domestic league appearances and goals as of 15:25, 7 September 2026 (UTC) ‡ National team caps and goals as of 23:48, 27 September 2026 (UTC)

Christopher James Mepham (/ˈmɛpəm/ MEHP-əm; born 5 November 1997) is a professional footballer who plays as a centre back for EFL Championship club West Bromwich Albion and the Wales national team.

== Club career ==
=== Early years ===
A centre back and occasional right back, Mepham began his career in the academy at Premier League club Chelsea at the age of 10. He was released at the age of 14 and was then turned down by Watford and Queens Park Rangers.

=== Brentford ===
==== Youth years (2012–2016) ====
Mepham joined the academy at Brentford in 2012, after being spotted by the club's Head of Academy Recruitment while making a one-off appearance for North Greenford United's reserve team. After making three appearances for the youth team as an U16, Mepham signed a scholarship deal in June 2014. On 2 February 2016 it was announced that Mepham had signed his first professional contract to be a member of the club's development squad and he finished his scholarship having made 43 appearances and scored two goals for the youth team. After consistently good performances for the reformed B team during the first half of the 2016–17 season, Mepham signed a two-year contract extension on 6 January 2017 and the following day, he made his senior debut as a late substitute for Harlee Dean during a 5–1 FA Cup third round victory over Eastleigh. A successful 2016–17 season saw Mepham named as the club's B Team Player of the Year.

==== Breakthrough (2016–2019) ====
After the departure of centre-back Harlee Dean on 30 August 2017, Mepham was promoted into the first team squad and signed a new five-year contract. He made his first start for the club in a 3–1 EFL Cup third round defeat to Norwich City on 19 September 2017 and gave away the penalty which led to the Canaries' opening goal. After appearing sporadically throughout the autumn, a head injury suffered by John Egan in December allowed Mepham a run in the team from the Christmas period until early February 2018. An achilles injury suffered by Andreas Bjelland in mid-March allowed Mepham back into the team and he scored the first senior goal of his career with the equaliser in a 1–1 draw with Sheffield United on Good Friday. He finished the 2017–18 season with 23 appearances and one goal.

Mepham began the 2018–19 season as the Bees' undisputed first-choice centre back in league matches, but was sent off for the first time in his career for two bookable offences committed during a 1–0 defeat to Bristol City on 20 October 2018. He made 27 appearances before departing the club for a club-record transfer fee in January 2019. During his two and a half seasons as a professional at Griffin Park, Mepham made 48 appearances and scored one goal.

=== Bournemouth ===
On 22 January 2019, Mepham signed a long-term contract with Premier League club Bournemouth for an undisclosed fee, reported to be £12 million. Eight days later, he made his debut for the club as a substitute for Junior Stanislas late in a 4–0 win over Chelsea. He continued to be regularly selected within the back line at Bournemouth due to the absence of Steve Cook through injury. Mepham finished the 2018–19 season with Bournemouth having made 13 Premier League appearances in total.

On 10 August 2019, Mepham scored his first Premier League goal, and his first ever goal for the Cherries, in a 1–1 home draw against newly promoted Sheffield United. Mepham made a further ten appearances in the Premier League for the Cherries throughout the first half of the 2019–20 season, including a starring role in a 1–0 away win and clean sheet at Chelsea on 14 December. However, Mepham would suffer a "significant knee injury" in the FA Cup game against Luton Town on 4 January, which would potentially rule him out for up to three months.

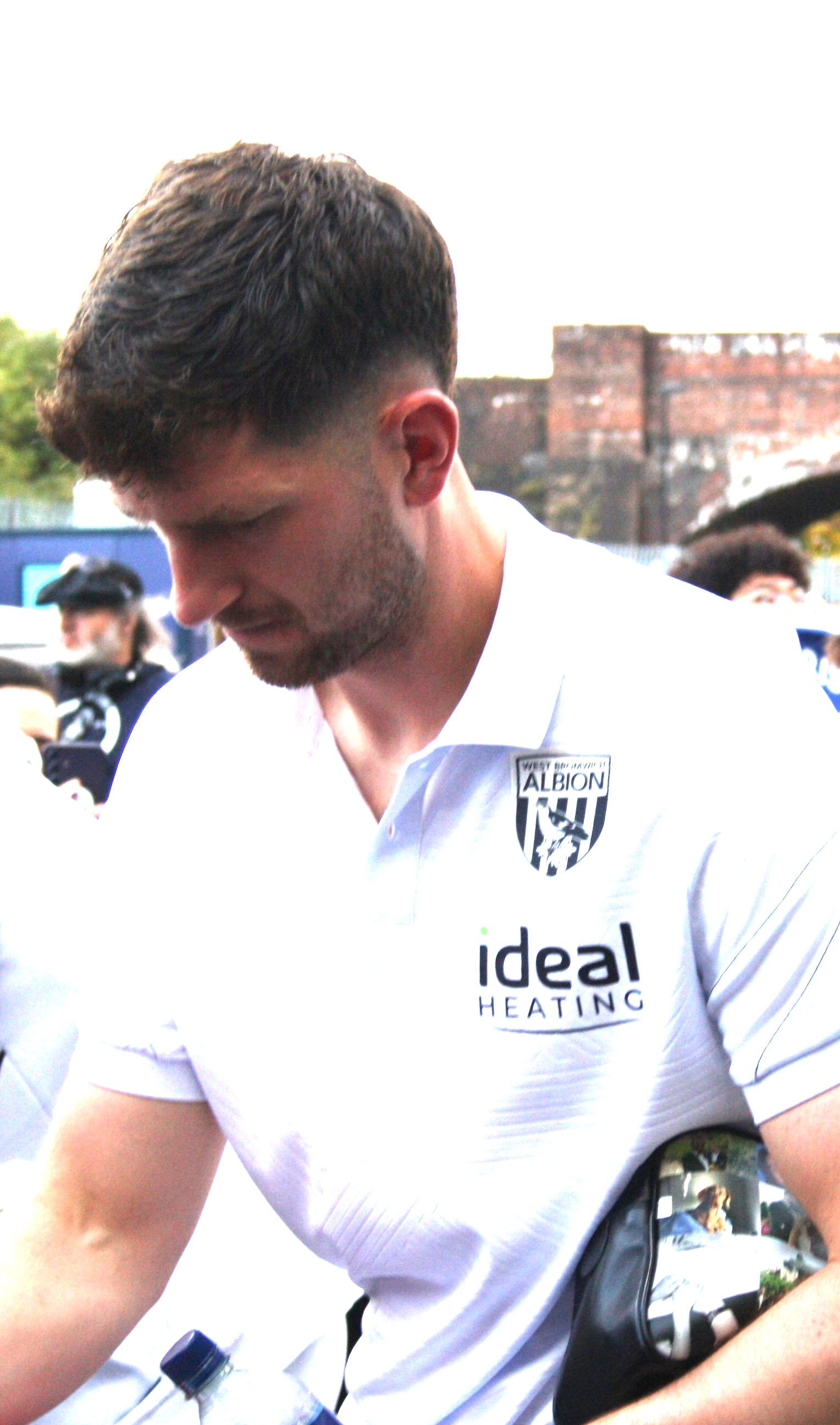
Mepham with West Bromwich in 2025

==== Sunderland (loan) ====
On 30 August 2024, Mepham joined Sunderland on a season-long loan. He made his debut in the 1-0 victory over Middlesbrough on 21 September 2024. On 8 March 2025, Mepham scored his first goal for Sunderland, proving to be the winner in a 2–1 victory against Cardiff, which was also his first goal for over four years.

=== West Bromwich Albion ===
On 28 August 2025, Mepham signed for Championship club West Bromwich Albion on a three-year deal for an undisclosed fee. He made his debut for the club on 30 August 2025, in a 1–0 win against Stoke City. Mepham went on to appear reularly for the Baggies in his debut season, scoring his first goal, a 95th minute equaliser, against Derby County in January 2026. Mepham was sidelined in February 2026 with a hamstring injury sustained against Stoke City. He made his return in August 2026, in a 3–2 League Cup defeat to Newcastle United.

== International career ==
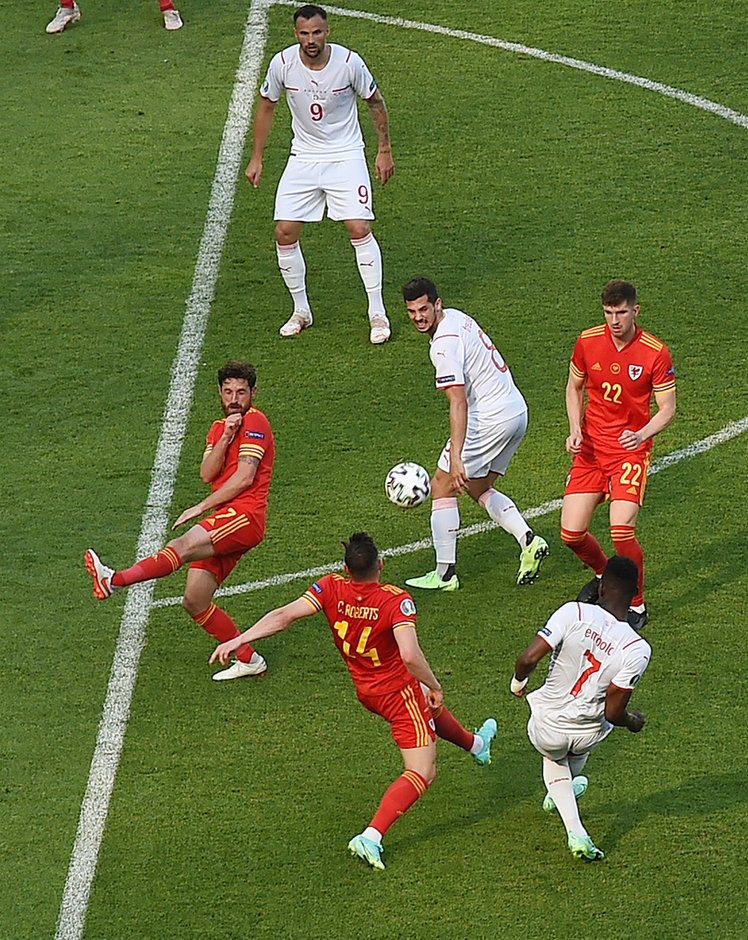
Mepham (N°22, center right) with Wales at UEFA Euro 2020

Mepham was called into the Wales U20 squad for the 2017 Toulon Tournament and made one appearance, in a 2–2 group stage draw with Ivory Coast on 5 June 2017. He made his U21 debut with a start in a 3–0 2019 UEFA U21 Championship qualifying victory over Switzerland on 2 September 2017. Mepham captained the U21 team for the first time in a 0–0 qualifying draw with Romania six weeks later.

In March 2018, Mepham won his maiden call-up to the senior team for the 2018 China Cup. He made his debut as a substitute for Ben Davies after 70 minutes of a 6–0 victory over China on 22 March 2018. Two months later, he made his first international start, in a 0–0 friendly draw with Mexico on 28 May.

In May 2021, he was selected for the Wales squad for the delayed UEFA Euro 2020 tournament. In November 2022, he was named in the Wales squad for the 2022 FIFA World Cup in Qatar.

== Personal life ==
Mepham was born in Northwick Park, the London Borough of Harrow. He attended Queensmead School in South Ruislip and grew up as a Queens Park Rangers supporter. His uncle Roy was a member of the Brentford youth team in the 1960s.

== Career statistics ==
=== Club ===
As of match played 5 September 2026

Appearances and goals by club, season and competition
Club	Season	League			FA Cup		League Cup		Other		Total	
Club	Season	Division	Apps	Goals	Apps	Goals	Apps	Goals	Apps	Goals	Apps	Goals
Brentford	2016–17	Championship	0	0	1	0	0	0	—		1	0
Brentford	2017–18	Championship	21	1	1	0	1	0	—		23	1
Brentford	2018–19	Championship	22	0	0	0	2	0	—		24	0
Brentford	Total		43	1	2	0	3	0	—		48	1
Bournemouth	2018–19	Premier League	13	0	—		—		—		13	0
Bournemouth	2019–20	Premier League	12	1	1	0	2	0	—		15	1
Bournemouth	2020–21	Championship	24	1	2	0	0	0	2 (Note: Appearances in EFL Championship play-offs)	0	28	1
Bournemouth	2021–22	Championship	22	0	1	0	1	0	—		24	0
Bournemouth	2022–23	Premier League	26	0	0	0	2	0	—		28	0
Bournemouth	2023–24	Premier League	10	0	1	0	2	0	—		13	0
Bournemouth	Total		107	2	5	0	7	0	2	0	121	2
Sunderland (loan)	2024–25	Championship	38	1	0	0	—		2	0	40	1
West Bromwich Albion	2025–26	Championship	25	1	1	0	—		—		24	1
West Bromwich Albion	2026–27	Championship	3	0	0	0	1	0	0	0	4	0
West Bromwich Albion	Total		28	1	1	0	1	0	0	0	30	0
Career total			220	5	8	0	11	0	4	0	233	5

=== International ===
As of match played 27 September 2026

Appearances and goals by national team and year
National team	Year	Apps	Goals
Wales	2018	4	0
Wales	2019	6	0
Wales	2020	4	0
Wales	2021	12	0
Wales	2022	10	0
Wales	2023	8	0
Wales	2024	3	0
Wales	2025	6	0
Wales	2026	4	0
Total		57	0

== Honours ==
Sunderland

- EFL Championship play-offs: 2025

Individual

- Brentford B Player of the Year: 2016–17
