= Eliezer Mayenda =

Spanish footballer (born 2005)

Personal information
- Full name: Eliezer Mayenda Dossou
- Date of birth: 8 May 2005 (age 21)
- Place of birth: Zaragoza, Spain
- Height: 1.80 m (5 ft 11 in)
- Positions: Forward; left midfielder

Team information
- Current team: Rennes
- Number: 12

Youth career
- 2010–2012: Ebro
- 2013–2016: Breuillet FC
- 2016–2019: CS Brétigny
- 2019–2022: Sochaux

Senior career*
Years	Team	Apps	(Gls)
2021–2023	Sochaux	15	(1)
2022	Sochaux B	14	(4)
2023–2026	Sunderland	65	(10)
2024	→ Hibernian (loan)	2	(0)
2026–	Rennes	0	(0)

International career^{‡}
2022	Spain U17	3	(0)
2025–	Spain U21	10	(2)
- * Club domestic league appearances and goals as of 17:02, 9 May 2026 (UTC) ‡ National team caps and goals as of 31 March 2026

Eliezer Mayenda Dossou (born 8 May 2005) is a Spanish professional footballer who plays as a forward or left midfielder for Ligue 1 club Rennes.

== Club career ==
=== Sochaux ===
Mayenda was born in Zaragoza in Spain. In November 2017, while playing for the youth teams of CS Brétigny, he agreed to join Sochaux. He made his professional debut for the club in a Coupe de France match against Nantes on 18 December 2021, coming on as a substitute at the 86th minute. After a 0–0 draw in regulation time, Nantes won 5–4 in a penalty shoot-out. By making the appearance, Mayenda became the youngest player to play in an official senior match for Sochaux at the age of 16 years, 7 months, and 10 days. On 29 January 2022, Mayenda made his debut for Sochaux's reserves in the Championnat National 3, coming on as a late substitute in a 3–1 win over FC Grandvillars. On 2 February, he signed his first professional contract, the youngest in Sochaux history to do so.

=== Sunderland ===
On 28 July 2023, Mayenda signed for EFL Championship club Sunderland on a five-year contract. According to L'Équipe, Sochaux and Sunderland agreed to a transfer fee slightly above €1 million, with the former keeping a 25% sell-on clause.

Mayenda was loaned to Scottish Premiership club Hibernian on 1 February 2024.

His first goals for Sunderland were against Sheffield Wednesday on 18 August 2024 where he scored twice in a 4–0 victory.

Mayenda scored Sunderland's first goal in the 2025 EFL Championship play-off final at Wembley Stadium on 24 May 2025, equalising in the 76th minute to level the score at 1–1. Sunderland went on to secure promotion to the Premier League, with the final ultimately ending 2–1.

Mayenda scored on his Premier League debut for Sunderland, the first goal in a 3–0 win over West Ham United on the opening matchday.

== International career ==
Born in Spain, Mayenda is of Congolese and Togolese descent. He holds Spanish, Congolese and Togolese citizenship. On 4 February 2022, he was called up to the Spain under-17s for the Torneio Internacional Algarve U17, a youth tournament held in Portugal.

== Career statistics ==
As of match played 9 May 2026

Appearances and goals by club, season and competition
Club	Season	League			National cup (Note: Includes Coupe de France, FA Cup, Scottish Cup)		League cup (Note: Includes EFL Cup)		Other		Total	
Club	Season	Division	Apps	Goals	Apps	Goals	Apps	Goals	Apps	Goals	Apps	Goals
Sochaux	2021–22	Ligue 2	0	0	1	0	—		—		1	0
Sochaux	2022–23	Ligue 2	15	1	0	0	—		—		15	1
Sochaux	Total		15	1	1	0	—		—		16	1
Sochaux B	2021–22	Championnat National 3	9	1	—		—		—		9	1
Sochaux B	2022–23	Championnat National 3	5	3	—		—		—		5	3
Sochaux B	Total		14	4	0	0	—		—		14	4
Sunderland	2023–24	Championship	8	0	0	0	0	0	—		8	0
Sunderland	2024–25	Championship	37	8	2	0	0	0	3 (Note: Appearances in EFL Championship play-offs)	2	42	10
Sunderland	2025–26	Premier League	20	2	3	0	0	0	—		23	2
Sunderland	Total		65	10	5	0	—		3	2	73	12
Hibernian (loan)	2023–24	Scottish Premiership	2	0	2	0	—		—		4	0
Career total			96	15	8	0	0	0	3	2	107	17

== Honours ==
Sunderland

- EFL Championship play-offs: 2025
