= Leo Hjelde =

Norwegian footballer (born 2003)

Personal information
- Full name: Leo Fuhr Hjelde
- Date of birth: 26 August 2003 (age 23)
- Place of birth: Nottingham, England
- Height: 1.88 m (6 ft 2 in)
- Positions: Left-back; centre-back

Team information
- Current team: Mechelen
- Number: 5

Youth career
- –2017: Trygg/Lade
- 2018–2019: Rosenborg
- 2019–2021: Celtic

Senior career*
Years	Team	Apps	(Gls)
2020–2021	Celtic	0	(0)
2021	→ Ross County (loan)	11	(1)
2021–2024	Leeds United	3	(0)
2023	→ Rotherham United (loan)	13	(0)
2024–2026	Sunderland	28	(0)
2026	→ Sheffield United (loan)	8	(0)
2026–	Mechelen	1	(0)

International career
2019	Norway U16	10	(0)
2019–2020	Norway U17	6	(0)
2021	Norway U18	3	(1)
2021	Norway U19	3	(0)
2021–2024	Norway U21	21	(0)
- * Club domestic league appearances and goals as of 16 August 2026

Leo Fuhr Hjelde (born 26 August 2003) is a professional footballer who plays as a left-back or centre-back for Belgian Pro League club Mechelen. Born in England, he has represented Norway at youth international level.

== Early life ==
Hjelde is the son of former Nottingham Forest and Rosenborg defender Jon Olav Hjelde, who was playing for South Korean K League club Busan I'cons when Leo was born in England. Jon Olav briefly returned to England to witness Leo's birth, after which the family moved to South Korea for several months to live with Jon Olav in Busan. They returned to England in mid-2004, and subsequently moved to Norway after Jon Olav's two-year spell at Mansfield Town ended in 2007.

== Club career ==
=== Celtic ===
On 29 July 2019, Hjelde signed a professional contract with Scottish Premiership club Celtic at 15 years old; he was brought straight into the reserve squad.

On 22 January 2021, Hjelde signed for Premiership side Ross County on loan for the remainder of the season. He made his league debut the following day against Rangers in a 5–0 defeat. He scored his first professional goal on 6 March 2021 in a 3–2 win against Kilmarnock. His performances on loan led to Ross County boss John Hughes likening the young defender to former Celtic player Virgil van Dijk.

=== Leeds United ===
On 27 August 2021, Hjelde signed for Leeds United for an undisclosed fee, signing a four-year deal at Elland Road.

Hjelde made his senior debut for Leeds United on 9 January 2022 in the starting line-up in 2–0 FA Cup third round defeat to West Ham United. He made his Premier League debut the following week, also at West Ham, when he came on as a first-half replacement for Junior Firpo in Leeds' 3–2 win, becoming the youngest Norwegian to play in the Premier League.

On 12 January 2023, Hjelde joined EFL Championship side Rotherham United on loan for the remainder of the 2022–23 season.

=== Sunderland ===
On 30 January 2024 Hjelde joined Sunderland on a four-and-a-half-year deal for an undisclosed fee. His first game for Sunderland was an EFL Championship fixture against Middlesbrough, which he played 90 minutes in, with the game ending 1–1.

On 2 February 2026, Hjelde joined Championship club Sheffield United on loan until the end of the season.

=== Mechelen ===
On 11 August 2026, Hjelde joined Belgian Pro League side Mechelen on a three-year contract, with the option of an additional year.

== Career statistics ==
As of match played 25 April 2026

Appearances and goals by club, season and competition
Club	Season	League			National cup (Note: Includes Scottish Cup, FA Cup)		League cup (Note: Includes EFL Cup)		Other		Total	
Club	Season	Division	Apps	Goals	Apps	Goals	Apps	Goals	Apps	Goals	Apps	Goals
Celtic	2020–21	Scottish Premiership	0	0	0	0	0	0	0	0	0	0
Celtic	2021–22	Scottish Premiership	0	0	0	0	0	0	0	0	0	0
Celtic	Total		0	0	0	0	0	0	0	0	0	0
Ross County (loan)	2020–21	Scottish Premiership	11	1	1	0	0	0	—		12	1
Leeds United	2021–22	Premier League	2	0	1	0	0	0	1 (Note: Appearances in EFL Trophy)	0	4	0
Leeds United	2022–23	Premier League	0	0	0	0	2	0	1	0	3	0
Leeds United	2023–24	Championship	1	0	0	0	0	0	0	0	1	0
Leeds United	Total		3	0	1	0	2	0	2	0	8	0
Rotherham United (loan)	2022–23	Championship	13	0	—		—		—		13	0
Sunderland	2023–24	Championship	11	0	—		—		—		11	0
Sunderland	2024–25	Championship	17	0	1	0	1	0	2 (Note: Appearances in EFL Championship play-offs)	0	21	0
Sunderland	2025–26	Premier League	0	0	0	0	0	0	—		0	0
Sunderland	2026–27	Premier League	0	0	0	0	0	0	—		0	0
Sunderland	Total		28	0	1	0	1	0	2	0	32	0
Sheffield United (loan)	2025–26	Championship	8	0	0	0	0	0	—		8	0
Career total			63	1	3	0	3	0	4	0	73	1

== Honours ==
Sunderland

- EFL Championship play-offs: 2025
