= Wilson Isidor =

Haitian footballer (born 2000)

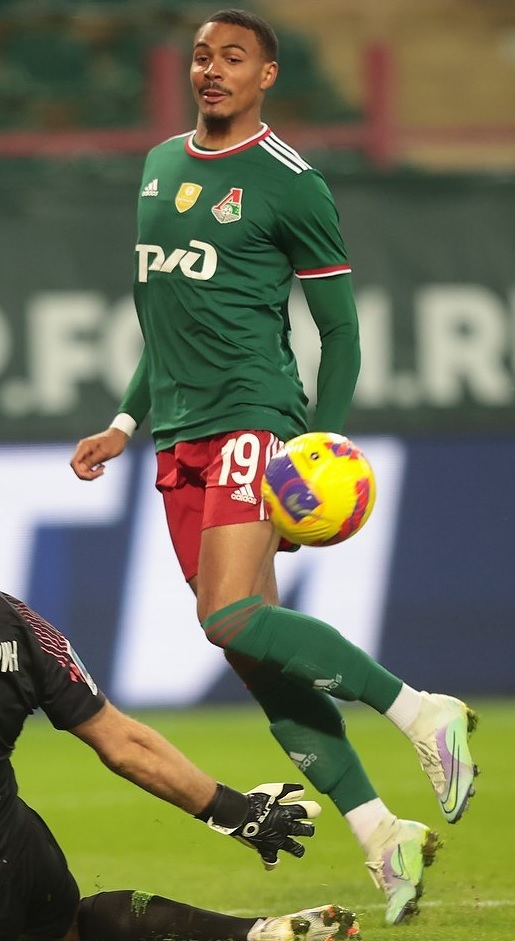
- Isidor with Lokomotiv Moscow in 2022

Personal information
- Full name: Wilson Isidor
- Date of birth: 27 August 2000 (age 26)
- Place of birth: Rennes, France
- Height: 1.86 m (6 ft 1 in)
- Position: Striker

Team information
- Current team: Sunderland
- Number: 18

Youth career
- 2007–2009: Le Rheu
- 2009–2018: Rennes

Senior career*
Years	Team	Apps	(Gls)
2017–2018	Rennes II	4	(0)
2018–2022	Monaco II	21	(5)
2018–2022	Monaco	5	(0)
2019–2020	→ Laval (loan)	14	(1)
2019–2020	→ Laval II (loan)	4	(3)
2020–2021	→ Bastia-Borgo (loan)	29	(15)
2022–2024	Lokomotiv Moscow	35	(16)
2023–2024	→ Zenit Saint Petersburg (loan)	14	(2)
2024–2025	Zenit Saint Petersburg	3	(1)
2024–2025	→ Sunderland (loan)	26	(9)
2025–	Sunderland	56	(10)

International career^{‡}
2017	France U17	6	(0)
2017–2018	France U18	7	(4)
2018–2019	France U19	8	(8)
2019	France U20	2	(0)
2026–	Haiti	11	(6)
- * Club domestic league appearances and goals as of 17:03, 31 October 2026 (UTC) ‡ National team caps and goals as of 03:14, 5 October 2026 (UTC)

Wilson Isidor (born 27 August 2000) is a professional footballer who plays as a forward for Premier League club Sunderland. Born in France, he represents the Haiti national team.

== Club career ==
=== Monaco ===
On 11 November 2018, Isidor made his professional debut with Monaco in a 4–0 Ligue 1 loss to Paris Saint-Germain. He subsequently had loan spells in Championnat National with Laval in the 2019–20 season and Bastia-Borgo in the 2020–21 season. In his time at Bastia-Borgo he was named Championnat National revelation of the season.

=== Lokomotiv Moscow ===
On 22 January 2022, he signed a 4.5-year contract with Russian club Lokomotiv Moscow. He scored at least once in each of his first 6 games in the Russian Premier League, repeating the record for most consecutive games with a goal at the start of the league career that was set a week prior to Isidor's sixth game by Yusuf Yazıcı. He was selected player of the month for April 2022 by the Russian Premier League.

On 30 January 2023, Lyon announced that Isidor failed their medical test due to persistent knee pain, which cancelled his loan move to the club.

Upon recovering from injury, Isidor finished the 2022–23 Russian Premier League season with 6 goals in the last 7 games, all after coming in as a second-half substitute.

=== Zenit Saint Petersburg ===
On 9 September 2023, Isidor moved to Zenit Saint Petersburg on loan for the 2023–24 season. Zenit reported that the contract includes an option to buy, while Lokomotiv reported it as an obligation to buy. The transfer was officially made permanent on 5 July 2024.

=== Sunderland ===
On 23 August 2024, Isidor joined EFL Championship club Sunderland on an initial season-long loan deal with the option to buy.

On 1 February 2025, Isidor signed a permanent deal with Sunderland, with a contract running until the summer of 2028. On 9 May, Isidor scored in Sunderland's 2–1 away win over Coventry City in the first leg of their Championship play-off semi-final tie. Sunderland would go on to reach the play-off final against Sheffield United on 24 May; they scored two late goals in the second half to secure promotion, marking the club's return to the Premier League since the 2016–17 season.

On 16 August 2025, Isidor scored Sunderland's third goal in their 3–0 win over West Ham on the club's return to the Premier League.

== International career ==
Born in France, Isidor is of Haitian and Malagasy descent. He was a youth international for France. In March 2026, he committed to representing Haiti internationally, and was named in the squad for the friendly matches against Tunisia and Iceland. He scored his first international goal for Haiti in 1–1 draw with Iceland on 31 March 2026.

On 15 May 2026, he was included in Haiti head coach Sébastien Migné's 26-man squad for the 2026 FIFA World Cup. He would go on to score Haiti's only goal of the tournament that was not an own goal, in a 4–2 defeat against Morocco. His goal was nominated for the 2026 FIFA World Cup Goal of the Tournament. He was called up by David Badía for the 2026–27 CONCACAF Nations League matches against Trinidad and Tobago and the Dominican Republic. He scored one goal against Trinidad and Tobago, and scored a brace against the Dominican Republic.

== Career statistics ==
=== Club ===
As of match played 31 October 2026

Appearances and goals by club, season and competition
Club	Season	League			National cup (Note: Includes Coupe de France, Russian Cup, FA Cup)		League cup (Note: Includes Coupe de la Ligue, EFL Cup)		Europe		Other		Total	
Club	Season	Division	Apps	Goals	Apps	Goals	Apps	Goals	Apps	Goals	Apps	Goals	Apps	Goals
Rennes II	2017–18	CFA 2	4	0	—		—		—		—		4	0
Monaco II	2018–19	CFA 2	16	3	—		—		—		—		16	3
Monaco II	2019–20	CFA 2	2	1	—		—		—		—		2	1
Monaco II	2021–22	CFA 2	3	1	—		—		—		—		3	1
Monaco II	Total		21	5	—		—		—		—		21	5
Monaco	2018–19	Ligue 1	1	0	1	0	1	0	0	0	0	0	3	0
Monaco	2021–22	Ligue 1	4	0	2	0	—		3 (Note: One appearance in UEFA Champions League, two appearances in UEFA Europa League)	0	—		9	0
Monaco	Total		5	0	3	0	1	0	3	0	0	0	12	0
Laval (loan)	2019–20	CFA	14	1	0	0	0	0	—		—		14	1
Laval II (loan)	2019–20	National 3	4	3	—		—		—		—		4	3
Bastia-Borgo (loan)	2020–21	CFA	29	15	0	0	—		—		—		29	15
Lokomotiv Moscow	2021–22	Russian Premier League	11	7	1	0	—		—		—		12	7
Lokomotiv Moscow	2022–23	Russian Premier League	20	8	4	2	—		—		—		24	10
Lokomotiv Moscow	2023–24	Russian Premier League	4	1	2	1	—		—		—		6	2
Lokomotiv Moscow	Total		35	16	7	3	—		—		—		42	19
Zenit Saint Petersburg (loan)	2023–24	Russian Premier League	14	2	7	0	—		—		—		21	2
Zenit Saint Petersburg	2024–25	Russian Premier League	3	1	2	1	—		—		0	0	5	2
Zenit Saint Petersburg	ZSP total		17	3	9	1	—		—		0	0	26	4
Sunderland (loan)	2024–25	Championship	26	9	0	0	—		—		—		26	9
Sunderland	2024–25	Championship	17	3	—		—		—		3 (Note: Appearances in Championship play-offs)	1	20	4
Sunderland	2025–26	Premier League	32	6	3	0	1	0	—		—		36	6
Sunderland	2026–27	Premier League	7	1	0	0	1	0	1 (Note: Appearance in UEFA Europa League)	0	—		9	1
Sunderland	Sunderland total		82	19	3	0	2	0	1	0	3	1	91	20
Career total			211	61	22	4	3	0	4	0	3	1	243	66

=== International ===
As of match played 4 October 2026

Appearances and goals by national team and year
National team	Year	Apps	Goals
Haiti	2026	11	6
Total		11	6

Scores and results list Haiti's goal tally first, score column indicates score after each Isidor goal.

List of international goals scored by Wilson Isidor
No.	Date	Venue	Cap	Opponent	Score	Result	Competition
1	31 March 2026	BMO Field, Toronto, Canada	2	Iceland	1–1	1–1	Friendly
2	5 June 2026	Nu Stadium, Miami, United States	4	Peru	1–0	1–2	Friendly
3	24 June 2026	Mercedes-Benz Stadium, Atlanta, United States	7	Morocco	2–1	2–4	2026 FIFA World Cup
4	24 September 2026	Sabina Park, Kingston, Jamaica	8	Trinidad and Tobago	3–2	3–2	2026–27 CONCACAF Nations League A
5	1 October 2026	Estadio Olímpico Félix Sánchez, Santo Domingo, Dominican Republic	10	Dominican Republic	2–0	4–1	2026–27 CONCACAF Nations League A
6	1 October 2026	Estadio Olímpico Félix Sánchez, Santo Domingo, Dominican Republic	10	Dominican Republic	3–1	4–1	2026–27 CONCACAF Nations League A

== Honours ==
=== Zenit Saint Petersburg ===
- Russian Premier League: 2023–24
- Russian Cup: 2023–24
- Russian Super Cup: 2024

=== Sunderland ===
- EFL Championship play-offs: 2025

=== Individual ===
- Championnat National Young Player of the Season: 2020–21
- Championnat National Player of the Month: January 2021
