= Oliver Langford =

English association football referee

Oliver Langford is an English referee and officiates primarily in the EFL Championship. He is not in the Select Group of match officials but is, however, on the Group Two list and trained in the use of Video Assisted Refereeing, which means he is qualified to take charge of an elite league match. He has been a referee since 2009.

== Career ==
He made his Premier League debut on 18 August 2019, when he was scheduled to be the fourth official in Chelsea's home match against Leicester City. However, referee Graham Scott was stuck in traffic on the M40. Scott arrived at the ground late and missed the warm-up so was replaced by Langford. The match finished in a 1–1 draw.

A controversial call by Langford during the 2024–25 EFL Championship season, in which he awarded Norwich City two goals after the ball had gone over a foot out of play, gave Norwich a 3–2 win over Derby County.

Later in the 2024–25 EFL Championship season, Langford sent off Sunderland's Trai Hume in the 7th minute during their match away to Bristol City. Langford adjudged that Hume had deliberately denied a goal scoring opportunity. The incident was widely regarded as not amounting to a foul. Bristol City went on to win the match 2–1. The result was considered as having a significant impact on qualification for the 2025 EFL Championship play-offs.
