= Dan Ballard (footballer) =

Northern Irish footballer (born 1999)

- Ballard playing for Sunderland in 2026

Personal information
- Full name: Daniel George Ballard
- Date of birth: 22 September 1999 (age 27)
- Place of birth: Stevenage, England
- Height: 6 ft 2 in (1.87 m)
- Position: Centre-back

Team information
- Current team: Sunderland
- Number: 5

Youth career
- 2007–2019: Arsenal

Senior career*
| Years | Team | Apps | (Gls) |
| 2019–2022 | Arsenal | 0 | (0) |
| 2019 | → Swindon Town (loan) | 1 | (0) |
| 2020–2021 | → Blackpool (loan) | 25 | (2) |
| 2021–2022 | → Millwall (loan) | 31 | (1) |
| 2022– | Sunderland | 115 | (7) |

International career^{‡}
- Northern Ireland U18
| 2018 | Northern Ireland U21 | 4 | (1) |
| 2020– | Northern Ireland | 34 | (5) |
- * Club domestic league appearances and goals as of 15:03, 20 September 2026 (UTC) ‡ National team caps and goals as of 13:00, 26 September 2026 (UTC)

Daniel George Ballard (born 22 September 1999) is a professional footballer who plays as a centre-back for Premier League club Sunderland. Born in England, he plays for the Northern Ireland national team.

== Club career ==
=== Arsenal ===
Born in Stevenage, Ballard joined the Arsenal Academy at the age of eight. He signed his first professional contract in June 2018. Having been released on two occasions, Arsenal offered him scholarship terms when he was 16 following an appearance in a friendly match, away at Bayern Munich.

==== Loan to Swindon Town ====
Ballard moved on loan from Arsenal to Swindon Town in July 2019. He made his debut in a 2–0 win against Scunthorpe United in the League Two on 3 August 2019, coming off the bench in the 88th minute. He then scored his first career goal in an EFL Trophy tie against Chelsea U21s on 6 August 2019. But his loan spell was cut short after just three appearances due to a severe knee injury that required 5 months of recovery time.

==== Loan to Blackpool ====
In October 2020, he moved on loan to Blackpool, signing with the club until January 2021. Ballard made his debut in a 1–0 loss against Charlton in League One on 20 October. On 5 January 2021, it was announced that the loan had been extended to the end of the season. He scored his first goal for the club in a 1–1 draw against Crewe Alexandra on 2 March 2021.

==== Loan to Millwall ====
He moved on loan to Millwall on 1 July 2021. He scored his first goal for the club when he scored against West Bromwich Albion on 11 September 2021 in a 1–1 draw.

=== Sunderland ===
On 30 June 2022, Ballard joined newly promoted Championship club Sunderland for an undisclosed fee, signing a three-year contract. On 16 September 2023, Ballard scored his first goal for Sunderland in a 3–1 win against QPR.

He signed a new deal in July 2024 to extend his time on Wearside until 2028.

On 13 May 2025, Ballard scored the winning goal (on aggregate) in extra time in the second leg of the 2024–25 EFL Championship play-off matchup with Coventry City, setting up a final match with Sheffield United. On 24 May 2025, Sunderland defeated Sheffield United 2–1 in the play-off final to earn promotion to the Premier League.

Ballard scored on his Premier League debut, the second goal in a 3–0 win over West Ham United on the opening matchday.

== International career ==
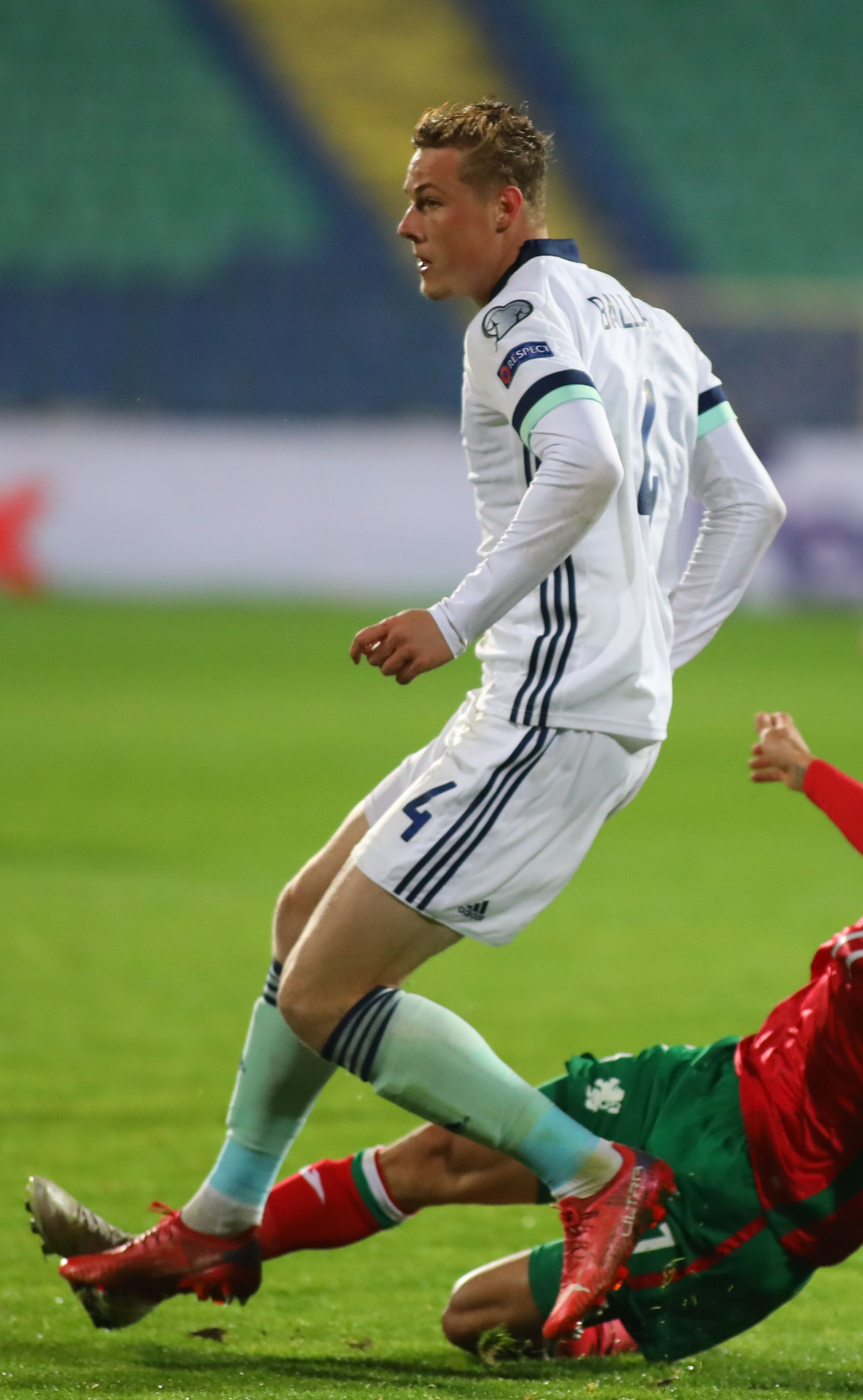
Ballard playing for Northern Ireland in 2021

Born in England, Ballard qualifies to represent Northern Ireland as his mother was born there.

He has represented Northern Ireland at Under-18 and Under-21 levels. He was called up to the senior team for the first time in March 2019. He made his senior debut in a 1–1 draw against Romania in a Nations League game in September 2020.

In September 2023, Ballard was injured and ruled out of Euros qualifying matches. In October 2024, he missed Nations League games due to injury. In August 2025 it was announced that he would miss the following month's World Cup qualifiers due to injury.

== Career statistics ==
=== Club ===
As of match played 20 September 2026

Appearances and goals by club, season and competition
| Club | Season | League | | | FA Cup | | EFL Cup | | Other | | Total | |
| Club | Season | Division | Apps | Goals | Apps | Goals | Apps | Goals | Apps | Goals | Apps | Goals |
|---|---|---|---|---|---|---|---|---|---|---|---|---|
| Arsenal | 2019–20 | Premier League | 0 | 0 | 0 | 0 | 0 | 0 | 0 | 0 | 0 | 0 |
| Arsenal | 2020–21 | Premier League | 0 | 0 | 0 | 0 | 0 | 0 | 0 | 0 | 0 | 0 |
| Arsenal | 2021–22 | Premier League | 0 | 0 | 0 | 0 | 0 | 0 | 0 | 0 | 0 | 0 |
| Arsenal | Total | | 0 | 0 | 0 | 0 | 0 | 0 | 0 | 0 | 0 | 0 |
| Swindon Town (loan) | 2019–20 | League Two | 1 | 0 | 0 | 0 | 1 | 0 | 1 (Note: Appearance in EFL Trophy) | 1 | 3 | 1 |
| Blackpool (loan) | 2020–21 | League One | 25 | 2 | 2 | 0 | 0 | 0 | 3 (Note: Appearances in League One play-offs) | 0 | 30 | 2 |
| Millwall (loan) | 2021–22 | Championship | 31 | 1 | 0 | 0 | 2 | 0 | — | | 33 | 1 |
| Sunderland | 2022–23 | Championship | 19 | 0 | 3 | 0 | 0 | 0 | 0 (Note: Appearances in EFL Championship play-offs) | 0 | 22 | 0 |
| Sunderland | 2023–24 | Championship | 42 | 3 | 1 | 0 | 0 | 0 | — | | 43 | 3 |
| Sunderland | 2024–25 | Championship | 20 | 2 | 0 | 0 | 0 | 0 | 3 | 1 | 23 | 3 |
| Sunderland | 2025–26 | Premier League | 29 | 2 | 2 | 0 | 0 | 0 | — | | 31 | 2 |
| Sunderland | 2026–27 | Premier League | 5 | 0 | 0 | 0 | 0 | 0 | 1 (Note: Appearance in UEFA Europa League) | 0 | 6 | 0 |
| Sunderland | Total | | 115 | 7 | 6 | 0 | 0 | 0 | 4 | 1 | 125 | 8 |
| Career total | | | 172 | 10 | 8 | 0 | 3 | 0 | 8 | 2 | 191 | 12 |

=== International ===
As of match played 25 September 2026

Appearances and goals by national team and year
| National team | Year | Apps | Goals |
|---|---|---|---|
| Northern Ireland | 2020 | 5 | 0 |
| Northern Ireland | 2021 | 7 | 1 |
| Northern Ireland | 2022 | 4 | 1 |
| Northern Ireland | 2023 | 5 | 0 |
| Northern Ireland | 2024 | 7 | 3 |
| Northern Ireland | 2025 | 5 | 0 |
| Northern Ireland | 2026 | 1 | 0 |
| Northern Ireland | Total | 34 | 5 |

Scores and results list Northern Ireland's goal tally first, score column indicates score after each Ballard goal.

List of international goals scored by Daniel Ballard
| No. | Date | Venue | Opponent | Cap | Score | Result | Competition |
|---|---|---|---|---|---|---|---|
| 1 | 2 September 2021 | LFF Stadium, Vilnius, Lithuania | Lithuania | 9 | 1–0 | 4–1 | 2022 FIFA World Cup qualification |
| 2 | 9 June 2022 | Fadil Vokrri Stadium, Pristina, Kosovo | Kosovo | 15 | 2–3 | 2–3 | 2022–23 UEFA Nations League C |
| 3 | 8 June 2024 | Estadi Mallorca Son Moix, Palma de Mallorca, Spain | Spain | 23 | 1–0 | 1–5 | Friendly |
| 4 | 5 September 2024 | Windsor Park, Belfast, Northern Ireland | Luxembourg | 25 | 2–0 | 2–0 | 2024–25 UEFA Nations League C |
| 5 | 15 November 2024 | Windsor Park, Belfast, Northern Ireland | Belarus | 27 | 1–0 | 2–0 | 2024-25 UEFA Nations League C |

== Honours ==
Blackpool

- EFL League One play-offs: 2021

Sunderland

- EFL Championship play-offs: 2025
