= 2025 EFL play-offs =

English Football League play-offs
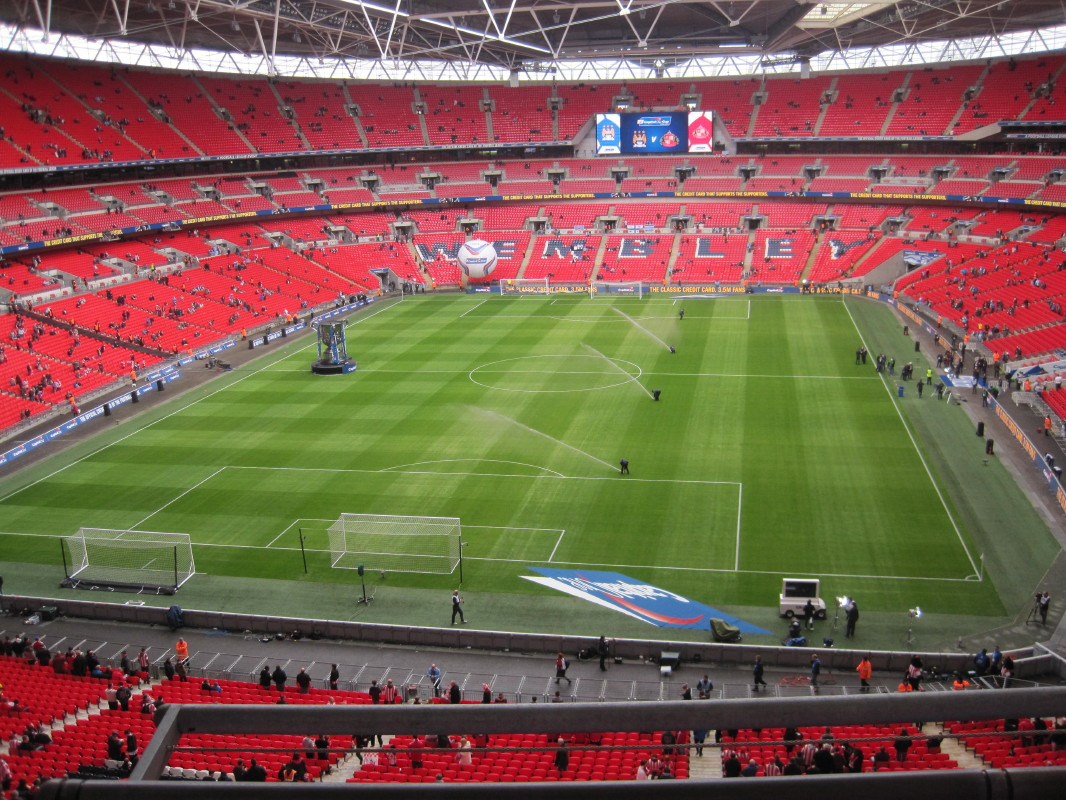
- Wembley Stadium was the venue for each play-off final
- Season: 2024–25
- Premier League (Promoted): Sunderland
- EFL Championship (Promoted): Charlton Athletic
- EFL League One (Promoted): AFC Wimbledon

The English Football League play-offs for the 2024–25 season (referred to as the Sky Bet Play-Offs for sponsorship reasons) were held in May 2025 with all finals being staged at Wembley Stadium in London.

The play-offs begin in each league with two semi-finals which were played over two legs. The teams who finished in 3rd to 6th place in the Championship and League One and the 4th to 7th-placed teams in League Two competed. The winners of the semi-finals advanced to the finals, with the winners gaining promotion for the following season.

All finals were kicked off one minute late, with the extra minute added to highlight the Every Minute Matters campaign, a collaboration between EFL sponsor Sky Bet and the British Heart Foundation which focused on the importance of learning CPR.

== Background ==
The English Football League play-offs have been held every year since 1987. They take place for each division following the conclusion of the regular season and are contested by the four clubs finishing below the automatic promotion places. The fixtures are determined by final league position – in the Championship and League One this is 3rd v 6th and 4th v 5th, while in League Two it is 4th v 7th and 5th v 6th.

== Championship ==
=== Championship semi-finals ===
The final table was confirmed after the final matchday on 3 May 2025. Going into the final day, Sheffield United and Sunderland had already confirmed both their place and finish in the play-offs at 3rd and 4th, respectively. Bristol City, Coventry City, Milwall, Blackburn Rovers, and Middlesbrough were all in the hunt for the last two spots. Coventry City leapfrogged Bristol City to 5th after beating Middlesbrough which eliminated them from reaching the play-offs. Despite their draw with relegation-threatened Preston North End, Bristol City finished 6th after Blackburn Rovers drew against Sheffield United and Millwall lost to title challengers Burnley.

Final league position – Championship
Pos	Team	Pld	W	D	L	GF	GA	GD	Pts
3	Sheffield United	46	28	8	10	63	36	+27	90
4	Sunderland	46	21	13	12	58	44	+14	76
5	Coventry City	46	20	9	17	64	59	+5	69
6	Bristol City	46	17	17	12	59	55	+4	68

First leg

8 May 2025
20:00 BST

Bristol City	0–3	Sheffield United
	Report	Burrows 45+3' (pen.); Brooks 73'; O'Hare 79'

Ashton Gate, Bristol
Attendance: 25,652
Referee: Oliver Langford
9 May 2025
20:00 BST

Coventry City	1–2	Sunderland
Rudoni 70'	Report	Isidor 68'; Mayenda 88'

Coventry Building Society Arena, Coventry
Attendance: 31,293
Referee: John Busby

Second leg

12 May 2025
20:00 BST

Sheffield United	3–0	Bristol City
Moore 41'; Hamer 52'; O'Hare 83'	Report

Bramall Lane, Sheffield
Attendance: 26,543
Referee: Peter Bankes

Sheffield United won 6–0 on aggregate.

13 May 2025
20:00 BST

Sunderland	1–1 (a.e.t.)	Coventry City
Ballard 120+2'	Report	Mason-Clark 76'

Stadium of Light, Sunderland
Attendance: 46,530
Referee: Andrew Madley

Sunderland won 3–2 on aggregate.

=== Championship final ===
24 May 2025
15:01 BST

Sheffield United	1–2	Sunderland
Campbell 25'	Report	Mayenda 76'; Watson 90+5'

Wembley Stadium, London
Attendance: 82,718
Referee: Chris Kavanagh

== League One ==
=== League One semi-finals ===
The final table was confirmed after the final matchday on 3 May 2025. Going into the final day, Stockport County, Wycombe Wanderers and Charlton Athletic had already qualified for the play-offs. Charlton leapfrogged Wycombe on the final day after the Addicks beat Burton Albion, while the Chairboys lost to Stockport. The final day also saw a two-way battle between Leyton Orient and Reading for the final spot, with Leyton Orient ahead on goal difference. Reading lost to Barnsley while Leyton Orient beat Huddersfield Town to put the O's in the last play-off spot.

Final league position – League One
Pos	Team	Pld	W	D	L	GF	GA	GD	Pts
3	Stockport County	46	25	12	9	72	42	+30	87
4	Charlton Athletic	46	25	10	11	67	43	+24	85
5	Wycombe Wanderers	46	24	12	10	70	45	+25	84
6	Leyton Orient	46	21	13	12	82	64	+18	78

First leg

10 May 2025
12:30 BST

Leyton Orient	2–2	Stockport County
Kelman 30', 88' (pen.)	Report	Norwood 60' (pen.); Horsfall 65'

Brisbane Road, London
Attendance: 8,571
Referee: Ben Speedie
11 May 2025
18:30 BST

Wycombe Wanderers	0–0	Charlton Athletic
	Report

Adams Park, High Wycombe
Attendance: 6,585
Referee: Farai Hallam

Second leg

14 May 2025
20:00 BST

Stockport County	1–1 (a.e.t.)	Leyton Orient
Olaofe 74'	Report	O'Neill 3'
Penalties
Norwood (penalty scored); Diamond (penalty missed); Rydel (penalty missed)	1–4	(penalty scored) James; (penalty scored) Clare; (penalty scored) Abdulai; (penalty scored) Galbraith

Edgeley Park, Stockport
Attendance: 10,592
Referee: James Bell

3–3 on aggregate, Leyton Orient won 4–1 on penalties.

15 May 2025
20:00 BST

Charlton Athletic	1–0	Wycombe Wanderers
Godden 81'	Report

The Valley, London
Attendance: 25,722
Referee: Dean Whitestone

Charlton Athletic won 1–0 on aggregate.

=== League One final ===
25 May 2025
13:01 BST

Charlton Athletic	1–0	Leyton Orient
Gillesphey 31'	Report

Wembley Stadium, London
Attendance: 76,193
Referee: Andrew Kitchen

== League Two ==
=== League Two semi-finals ===
The final table was confirmed after the final matchday on 3 May 2025. Going into the final day, Bradford City, Walsall, and Notts County had already secured a play-off place but they could still gain automatic promotion. Notts County eliminated themselves from automatic contention after losing to champions Doncaster Rovers. Bradford City then clinched the lone remaining automatic promotion spot with their 96th minute winner against Fleetwood Town, condemning Walsall - who were beating Crewe Alexandra - to the playoffs. The remaining two places were under contention between AFC Wimbledon, Salford City, Grimsby Town, Chesterfield and Colchester United. AFC Wimbledon clinched their spot with a win against Grimsby Town, eliminating the Mariners and leapfrogging Notts County in the process. Chesterfield beat Accrington Stanley to clinch the final playoff spot after Salford City and Colchester United could only draw against relegated Carlisle United and Barrow respectively.

Final league position – League Two
Pos	Team	Pld	W	D	L	GF	GA	GD	Pts
4	Walsall	46	21	14	11	75	54	+21	77
5	AFC Wimbledon	46	20	13	13	56	35	+21	73
6	Notts County	46	20	12	14	68	49	+19	72
7	Chesterfield	46	19	13	14	73	54	+19	70

First leg

10 May 2025
20:00 BST

Notts County	0–1	AFC Wimbledon
	Report	Harbottle 59'

Meadow Lane, Nottingham
Attendance: 12,385
Referee: Thomas Kirk
11 May 2025
15:30 BST

Chesterfield	0–2	Walsall
	Report	Allen 28' (pen.); Chang 39'

SMH Group Stadium, Chesterfield
Attendance: 10,001
Referee: Martin Coy

Second leg

16 May 2025
20:00 BST

Walsall	2–1	Chesterfield
Lakin 81'; Amantchi 90+5'	Report	Dobra 90+4'

Bescot Stadium, Walsall
Attendance: 9,585
Referee: Ben Toner

Walsall won 4–1 on aggregate.

17 May 2025
12:30 BST

AFC Wimbledon	1–0	Notts County
Neufville 8'	Report

Plough Lane, Wimbledon
Attendance: 8,501
Referee: Lewis Smith

AFC Wimbledon won 2–0 on aggregate.

=== League Two final ===
26 May 2025
15:01 BST

AFC Wimbledon	1–0	Walsall
Hippolyte 45+2'	Report

Wembley Stadium, London
Attendance: 50,947
Referee: Will Finnie
