= 2021–22 Sunderland A.F.C. season =

English football club season

Sunderland
2021–22 season
- Owner: Kyril Louis-Dreyfus
- Chairman: Kyril Louis-Dreyfus
- Head coach: Lee Johnson (until 30 January); Alex Neil (from 11 February)
- Stadium: Stadium of Light
- League One: 5th (promoted via playoffs)
- Play-offs: Winners
- FA Cup: First round
- EFL Cup: Quarter-finals
- EFL Trophy: Second round
- Top goalscorer: League: Ross Stewart (24); All: Ross Stewart (26)
- Highest home attendance: 44,742 v. Sheffield Wednesday (League One play-offs); 38,395 v. Doncaster Rovers (League)
- Lowest home attendance: 26,516 v. Morecambe
- Average home league attendance: 31,421
Home colours	Away colours

The 2021–22 season was Sunderland's 143rd year in their history and fourth consecutive season in League One. Along with the league, the club competed in the FA Cup, the EFL Cup and the EFL Trophy. The season covers the period from 1 July 2021 to 30 June 2022.

Sunderland finished fifth in the regular season, entering the EFL League One play-offs. They beat Sheffield Wednesday over two legs in the semi-final and Wycombe Wanderers in the final at Wembley to secure a return to the EFL Championship.

== First team squad ==
Squad No.	Name	Nationality	Position(s)	Age	Ends	Signed from	Apps	Goals
Goalkeepers
1	Lee Burge	(England)	GK	33	2022	(England) Coventry City	61	0
20	Anthony Patterson	(England)	GK	26	2023	Academy	6	0
31	Jacob Carney	(England)	GK	25	2023	(England) Manchester United	0	0
35	Harrison Bond	(England)	GK	22	2022	Academy	0	0
39	Ron-Thorben Hoffmann	(Germany)	GK	27	2022	(Germany) Bayern Munich (loan)	4	0
47	Jack McIntyre	(England)	GK	23	2023	(England) Everton	0	0
Defenders
2	Niall Huggins	(Wales)	RB	25	2025	(England) Leeds United	4	0
5	Danny Batth	(England)	CB	35	2023	(England) Stoke City	0	0
6	Callum Doyle	(England)	CB	22	2022	(England) Manchester City (loan)	10	0
16	Jordan Willis	(England)	CB	31	2022	(England) Coventry City	60	2
17	Dennis Cirkin	(England)	LB	24	2024	(England) Tottenham Hotspur	9	0
19	Arbenit Xhemajli	(Kosovo)	CB	28	2022	(Switzerland) Neuchâtel Xamax	1	0
26	Bailey Wright	(Australia)	CB	33	2022	(England) Bristol City	56	3
30	Patrick Almond	(Scotland)	CB	23	2023	Academy	0	0
32	Trai Hume	(Northern Ireland)	RB	24	2026	(Northern Ireland) Linfield	0	0
34	Tyrese Dyce	(England)	LB	25	2023	(England) West Brom	0	0
38	Cameron Jessup	(England)	CB	23	2023	(England) Crystal Palace	0	0
40	Nathan Newall	(England)	LB	24	2023	(England) Guiseley	0	0
41	Kenton Richardson	(England)	RB	26	2022	(England) Hartlepool United	0	0
42	Ethan Kachosa	(England)	RB	23	2023	(England) Leeds United	0	0
58	Zak Johnson	(England)	RB	17	2023	Academy	0	0
Midfielders
4	Corry Evans	(Northern Ireland)	CM	35	2023	(England) Blackburn Rovers	6	0
8	Elliot Embleton	(England)	AM	27	2022	Academy	22	2
11	Lynden Gooch	(United States)	AM	30	2022	Academy	175	24
13	Luke O'Nien	(England)	CM	31	2024	(England) Wycombe Wanderers	150	13
15	Carl Winchester	(Northern Ireland)	CM	33	2023	(England) Forest Green Rovers	31	4
18	Ellis Taylor	(England)	LW	23	2024	Academy	1	0
21	Alex Pritchard	(England)	AM	33	2023	(England) Huddersfield Town	10	0
23	Jack Diamond	(England)	RW	26	2024	Academy	38	5
24	Dan Neil	(England)	CM	24	2023	Academy	19	1
25	Jack Clarke	(England)	RW	25	2022	(England) Tottenham Hotspur (loan)	0	0
27	Jay Matete	(England)	CM	25	2026	(England) Fleetwood Town	0	0
28	Aiden McGeady	(Republic of Ireland)	LW	40	2022	(England) Everton	144	35
36	Cieran Dunne	(Scotland)	LW	26	2022	(Scotland) Falkirk	0	0
43	Harrison Sohna	(England)	CM	23	2023	(England) Aston Villa	0	0
45	Stephen Wearne	(England)	AM	25	2022	(England) Middlesbrough	0	0
46	Sam Wilding	(England)	DM	26	2022	(England) West Brom	0	0
51	Thomas Scott	(England)	CM	18	2023	(England) Northampton Town	0	0
52	Joseph Ryder	(England)	LW	17	2023	Academy	0	0
53	Ben Middlemas	(England)	CM	17	2023	Academy	0	0
60	Caden Kelly	(England)	CM	17	2023	Academy	0	0
77	Patrick Roberts	(England)	RW	29	2022	(England) Manchester City	0	0
Forwards
7	Leon Dajaku	(Germany)	ST	25	2022	(Germany) Union Berlin (loan)	4	2
9	Nathan Broadhead	(Wales)	ST	28	2022	(England) Everton (loan)	6	1
10	Jermain Defoe	(England)	ST	43	2022	(Scotland) Rangers	93	37
14	Ross Stewart	(Scotland)	ST	29	2023	(Scotland) Ross County	24	10
22	Will Grigg	(Northern Ireland)	ST	34	2022	(England) Wigan Athletic	57	8
37	Will Harris	(England)	ST	25	2022	(England) Burnley	0	0
48	Benjamin Mbunga-Kimpioka	(Sweden)	ST	26	2022	(Sweden) IK Sirius	14	3

== Pre-season friendlies ==
Sunderland announced they will play friendlies against Spennymoor Town, Heart of Midlothian, York City, Harrogate Town, Tranmere Rovers and Hull City as part of the club's pre season preparations.

3 July 2021 Friendly	Spennymoor Town	2–2	Sunderland	Spennymoor
15:00 BST	Tait; Kennedy	Report	O'Brien; Taylor	Stadium: The Brewery Field

17 July 2021 Friendly	Heart of Midlothian	0–2	Sunderland	Gorgie, Scotland
15:00 BST		Report	McGeady 14' (pen.), 41'	Stadium: Tynecastle Park

21 July 2021 Friendly	York City	1–1	Sunderland	Huntington
19:00 BST	Willoughby 52'	Report	Neil 28'	Stadium: LNER Community Stadium

24 July 2021 Friendly	Harrogate Town	0–4	Sunderland	Harrogate
15:00 BST		Report	Embleton 11', 15'; Winchester 40'; Taylor 68'	Stadium: EnviroVent Stadium; Attendance: 0 (Behind-closed-doors)

27 July 2021 Friendly	Tranmere Rovers	0–0	Sunderland	Birkenhead
19:00 BST		Report		Stadium: Prenton Park

30 July 2021 Friendly	Sunderland	2–1	Hull City	Sunderland
19:00 BST	Stewart 25'; Grigg 90'	Report	Magennis 68'	Stadium: Stadium of Light

== Competitions ==
=== League One ===
==== League table ====
Pos	Team	Pld	W	D	L	GF	GA	GD	Pts	Promotion, qualification or relegation
1	Wigan Athletic (C, P)	46	27	11	8	82	44	+38	92	Promotion to EFL Championship
2	Rotherham United (P)	46	27	9	10	70	33	+37	90	Promotion to EFL Championship
3	Milton Keynes Dons	46	26	11	9	78	44	+34	89	Qualification for League One play-offs
4	Sheffield Wednesday	46	24	13	9	78	50	+28	85	Qualification for League One play-offs
5	Sunderland (O, P)	46	24	12	10	79	53	+26	84	Qualification for League One play-offs
6	Wycombe Wanderers	46	23	14	9	75	51	+24	83	Qualification for League One play-offs
7	Plymouth Argyle	46	23	11	12	68	48	+20	80	
8	Oxford United	46	22	10	14	82	59	+23	76	
9	Bolton Wanderers	46	21	10	15	74	57	+17	73	

Source: EFL Official Website
Rules for classification: 1) Points; 2) Goal difference; 3) Number of goals scored; 4) Head-to-head results; 5) Wins; 6) Away goals; 7) Penalty points based on yellow and red cards received excluding the last four games of the season (sec 9.5); 8) 12-point sending off offences; 9) If the tie affects the automatic promotion or relegation places, a play-off game or games would be held between the two tied teams
(C) Champions; (O) Play-off winners; (P) Promoted

==== Results summary ====
Overall								Home						Away					
Pld	W	D	L	GF	GA	GD	Pts	W	D	L	GF	GA	GD	W	D	L	GF	GA	GD
46	24	12	10	79	53	+26	84	16	3	4	49	19	+30	8	9	6	30	34	−4

Last updated: 30 April 2022.

==== Results by matchday ====
Matchday	1	2	3	4	5	6	7	8	9	10	11	12	13	14	15	16	17	18	19	20	21	22	23	24	25	26	27	28	29	30	31	32	33	34	35	36	37	38	39	40	41	42	43	44	45	46
Ground	H	A	A	H	H	H	A	H	H	A	A	A	H	A	A	H	A	A	H	H	H	A	A	H	A	H	A	H	A	H	A	A	H	H	A	A	H	H	A	H	A	H	A	H	H	A
Result	W	W	L	W	W	W	D	W	W	L	W	W	L	L	L	W	D	W	D	W	W	D	W	W	D	L	D	W	L	L	L	D	L	D	W	D	W	W	D	W	W	W	D	W	D	W
Position	3	3	8	5	1	1	2	2	1	2	4	2	4	5	5	6	6	5	5	4	3	3	2	1	2	2	2	2	3	4	4	4	7	6	5	7	5	5	6	6	6	6	6	4	5	5
Points	3	6	6	9	12	15	16	19	22	22	25	28	28	28	28	31	32	35	36	39	42	43	46	49	50	50	51	54	54	54	54	55	55	56	59	60	63	66	67	70	73	76	77	80	81	84

Updated to match(es) played on 26 April 2022. Source: Statto.com
A = Away; H = Home; W = Win; D = Draw; L = Loss

==== Matches ====
The Black Cats fixtures were released on 24 June 2021.

7 August 2021 1	Sunderland	2–1	Wigan Athletic	Sunderland
15:15 BST (Delayed from 15:00)	McGeady 17' (pen.); Stewart 53'; Winchester (yellow card) 57'	Report	Edwards 15'; Power (yellow card) 38'; Edwards (yellow card) 50'; Darikwa (yellow card) 87'; Wyke (yellow card) 90+6'	Stadium: Stadium of Light; Attendance: 31,549; Referee: Robert Madley

14 August 2021 2	Milton Keynes Dons	1–2	Sunderland	Milton Keynes
15:00 BST	Jules (yellow card) 48'; Parrott 56'; Harvie (yellow card) 73'	Report	Stewart 42' (yellow card) 50'; Embleton 52' (yellow card) 90+5'; Gooch (yellow card) 73' (penalty missed) 84'; Flanagan (yellow card) 79'	Stadium: Stadium MK; Attendance: 9,830 (3,000 away fans); Referee: James Bell

17 August 2021 3	Burton Albion	1–0	Sunderland	Burton upon Trent
19:45 BST	Mancienne (yellow card) 56'; Smith 66'; Powell (yellow card) 84'	Report	Cirkin (yellow card) 37'; Flanagan (yellow card) 90+5'	Stadium: Pirelli Stadium; Attendance: 4,239 (1,600 away fans); Referee: Declan Bourne

21 August 2021 4	Sunderland	1–0	AFC Wimbledon	Sunderland
15:00 BST	Gooch (yellow card) 18'; Flanagan (yellow card) 27'; Winchester 64'; O'Nien (yellow card) 90+4'	Report	Assal (yellow card) 62'	Stadium: Stadium of Light; Attendance: 29,093; Referee: James Oldham

28 August 2021 5	Sunderland	3–1	Wycombe Wanderers	Sunderland
15:00 BST	Stewart 14' 83'; Embleton 18'; Flanagan (yellow card) 77'	Report	Scowen (yellow card) 31'; Wheeler 90+2'	Stadium: Stadium of Light; Attendance: 29,344; Referee: John Busby

11 September 2021 6	Sunderland	2–1	Accrington Stanley	Sunderland
15:00 BST	Neil 15'; Gooch (yellow card) 25'; Flanagan (yellow card) 50'; Winchester 58'; Embleton (yellow card) 78'; Pritchard (yellow card) 86'	Report	Pell (yellow card) 25'; Nottingham 30'; Nottingham (yellow card) 45+2'; Morgan (yellow card) 71'	Stadium: Stadium of Light; Attendance: 29,830; Referee: Anthony Backhouse

18 September 2021 7	Fleetwood Town	2–2	Sunderland	Fleetwood
15:00 BST	Morton 81'; J. Garner (yellow card) 85'; G. Garner (yellow card) 90+4', (goal) 90+7' (pen.)	Report	Stewart 19'; O'Nien (yellow card) 53'; McGeady 76' (pen.)	Stadium: Highbury Stadium; Attendance: 4,250 (1,200 away fans); Referee: Neil Hair

25 September 2021 8	Sunderland	1–0	Bolton Wanderers	Sunderland
15:00 BST	Winchester 17'; O'Nien (yellow card) 45+3'	Report	Doyle (yellow card) 42'; Afolayan (yellow card) 69'; Santos (yellow card) 90+3'	Stadium: Stadium of Light; Attendance: 32,368; Referee: Sam Purkiss

28 September 2021 9	Sunderland	5–0	Cheltenham Town	Sunderland
19:45 BST	Wright 11'; Stewart 28', 38'; O'Nien 65'; Dajaku 66'	Report	Freestone (yellow card) 30'; May (yellow card) 52'; Thomas (yellow card) 81'	Stadium: Stadium of Light; Attendance: 28,313; Referee: Chris Sarginson

2 October 2021 10	Portsmouth	4–0	Sunderland	Portsmouth
15:00 BST	Harness 19'; Brown 33'; Tunnicliffe (yellow card) 41'; Marquis 45', 61'; Curtis (yellow card) 90+2'	Report	Neil (yellow card) 84'	Stadium: Fratton Park; Attendance: 17,418 (2,200 away fans); Referee: Ben Toner

16 October 2021 11	Gillingham	1–2	Sunderland	Gillingham
15:00 BST	Lloyd 25' (pen.); Kelman (yellow card) 90+3'	Report	Cirkin (yellow card) 43'; O'Brien 45+3'; Flanagan 54'; Embleton (red card) 67'; Stewart (yellow card) 84'	Stadium: Priestfield; Attendance: 6,310 (2,400 away fans); Referee: Lee Swabey

19 October 2021 12	Crewe Alexandra	0–4	Sunderland	Crewe
19:45 BST	Murphy (yellow card) 75'	Report	Thomas 25' (o.g.); Stewart 32', 55'; Winchester (yellow card) 51'; Cirkin (yellow card) 53'; Dajaku 73'	Stadium: Gresty Road; Attendance: 5,618 (1,900 away fans); Referee: Carl Boyeson

23 October 2021 13	Sunderland	0–1	Charlton Athletic	Sunderland
15:00 BST	Flanagan (yellow card) 67'; Evans (yellow card) 90'	Report	Stockley 66'; Dobson (yellow card) 44'; Purrington (yellow card) 84'	Stadium: Stadium of Light; Attendance: 31,883; Referee: Darren Drysdale

30 October 2021 14	Rotherham United	5–1	Sunderland	Rotherham
15:00 BST	Smith 10' (73) (yellow card) 71'; Ladapo 41' (88); Ihiekwe 53'; Ferguson (yellow card) 70'	Report	Stewart 24'; O'Nien (yellow card) 38'; McGeady (yellow card) 46' (yellow-red card) 56'; Evans (yellow card) 64'	Stadium: New York Stadium; Attendance: 10,573 (2,690 away fans); Referee: David Rock

2 November 2021 15	Sheffield Wednesday	3–0	Sunderland	Sheffield
19:45 GMT	Corbeanu 11'; Kamberi 39'; Gregory 53'; Johnson (yellow card) 58'; Adeniran (yellow card) 87'	Report		Stadium: Hillsborough Stadium; Attendance: 23,731 (4,450 away fans); Referee: Craig Hicks

20 November 2021 16	Sunderland	2–0	Ipswich Town	Sunderland
15:00 GMT	Evans (yellow card) 20'; Gooch (yellow card) 34'; Stewart (yellow card) 64'; Winchester (yellow card) 81'; O'Nien 85'; McGeady 90+3' (pen.)	Report	Celina (yellow card) 55'	Stadium: Stadium of Light; Attendance: 31,940; Referee: Tom Nield

23 November 2021 17	Shrewsbury Town	1–1	Sunderland	Shrewsbury
19:45 GMT	Davis (red card) 45+2'; Udoh 64'	Report	Pritchard 16'; Broadhead (yellow card) 44'	Stadium: New Meadow; Attendance: 6,253 (1,098 away fans); Referee: Peter Wright

27 November 2021 18	Cambridge United	1–2	Sunderland	Cambridge
15:00 GMT	Smith 27'	Report	Mitov 16' (o.g.); Pritchard (yellow card) 24'; Broadhead 36'	Stadium: Abbey Stadium; Attendance: 7,174 (2,400 away fans); Referee: Robert Lewis

4 December 2021 19	Sunderland	1–1	Oxford United	Sunderland
15:00 GMT	Dajaku 7'; Wright (yellow card) 13'; Neil (yellow card) 40'	Report	Brannagan (yellow card) 5'; Taylor (yellow card) 13', (goal) 36'	Stadium: Stadium of Light; Attendance: 26,634; Referee: Jeremy Simpson

7 December 2021 20	Sunderland	5–0	Morecambe	Sunderland
19:45 GMT	Stewart 13'; Broadhead 17', 68'; Pritchard 56'; Dajaku 87'	Report	Ayunga (yellow card) 71'	Stadium: Stadium of Light; Attendance: 26,516; Referee: Ollie Yates

11 December 2021 21	Sunderland	2–1	Plymouth Argyle	Sunderland
15:00 GMT	Neil 4'; Broadhead 13'; Winchester (yellow card) 45+1'; Stewart (yellow card) 54'; Wright (yellow card) 77'; O'Brien (yellow card) 81'	Report	Edwards (yellow card) 22'; Scarr 64'; Houghton (yellow card) 85'	Stadium: Stadium of Light; Attendance: 28,987; Referee: Scott Oldham

18 December 2021 22	Ipswich Town	1–1	Sunderland	Ipswich
15:00 GMT	Norwood 45+1'; Burns (yellow card) 68'	Report	Broadhead 50'; Winchester (yellow card) 52'; Flanagan (yellow card) 60'; Stewart (yellow card) 62'	Stadium: Portman Road; Attendance: 29,005 (1,750 away fans); Referee: Thomas Bramall

27 December 2021 23	Doncaster Rovers	0–3	Sunderland	Doncaster
12:30 GMT	Gardner (yellow card) 83'	Report	Stewart 7' (pen.); Embleton 41'; Blythe 50' (o.g.); Doyle (yellow card) 88'	Stadium: Keepmoat Stadium; Attendance: 10,751 (4,100 away fans); Referee: Bobby Madley

30 December 2021 24	Sunderland	5–0	Sheffield Wednesday	Sunderland
19:45 GMT	Stewart 12', 36', 58'; Neil (yellow card) 24'; Doyle 40'; Embleton (yellow card) 67'; Mbunga-Kimpioka 75'	Report	Bannan (yellow card) 67'	Stadium: Stadium of Light; Attendance: 34,652; Referee: Ben Toner

8 January 2022 25	Wycombe Wanderers	3–3	Sunderland	High Wycombe
12:30 GMT	Mehmeti 13'; Scowen (yellow card) 22'; Vokes 36'; Jacobson (yellow card) 45+2', (goal) 90+8'	Report	Stockdale 3' (o.g.); Stewart 39', 90+3'; Embleton (yellow card) 83'	Stadium: Adams Park; Attendance: 7,229 (1,800 away fans); Referee: Charles Breakspear

11 January 2022 26	Sunderland	1–3	Lincoln City	Sunderland
19:45 GMT	Winchester (yellow card) 41', (red card) 56'; Stewart 68'; Doyle (yellow card) 90+7'	Report	Maguire (yellow card) 10', (goal) 31', 57' (pen.), 75'; Bishop (yellow card) 23'; Eyoma (yellow card) 42'; Whittaker (yellow card) 64'; Fiorini (yellow card) 84'; Sørensen (yellow card) 90+1'; McGrandles (yellow card) 90+7'	Stadium: Stadium of Light; Attendance: 27,782; Referee: Jeremy Simpson

15 January 2022 27	Accrington Stanley	1–1	Sunderland	Accrington
15:00 GMT	Sykes (yellow card) 58' (yellow-red card) 76'; Hamilton (yellow card) 82'; Clark 84'	Report	O'Brien 48'	Stadium: Wham Stadium; Attendance: 4,498 (2,600 away fans); Referee: James Bell

22 January 2022 28	Sunderland	1–0	Portsmouth	Sunderland
15:00 GMT	Embleton 40'; Flanagan (yellow card) 54'	Report	Romeo (yellow card) 72'; Williams (yellow card) 75'	Stadium: Stadium of Light; Attendance: 32,220; Referee: David Rock

29 January 2022 29	Bolton Wanderers	6–0	Sunderland	Bolton
15:00 GMT	Charles 19', 51'; Afolayan 42'; Lee 59'; Bakayoko (yellow card) 84'; Batth 85' (o.g.); John 88'	Report	Gooch (yellow card) 81'	Stadium: University of Bolton Stadium; Attendance: 20,059 (6,020 away fans); Referee: Steve Martin

5 February 2022 30	Sunderland	1–2	Doncaster Rovers	Sunderland
15:00 GMT	Evans (yellow card) 30', (goal) 89'	Report	Griffiths 22'; Rowe 45+2'	Stadium: Stadium of Light; Attendance: 38,395; Referee: Will Finnie

8 February 2022 30	Cheltenham Town	2–1	Sunderland	Cheltenham
19:45 GMT	Boyle (yellow card) 38'; Bonds 64'; May 78'	Report	Pritchard 32'; Batth (yellow card) 50'; Roberts (yellow card) 88'; Matete (yellow card) 90'	Stadium: Jonny-Rocks Stadium; Attendance: 5,744 (1,500 away fans); Referee: Darren Drysdale

12 February 2022 32	AFC Wimbledon	1–1	Sunderland	Wimbledon
15:00 GMT	McCormick 20' (pen.), (yellow card) 44' (yellow-red card) 90'; Heneghan (yellow card) 25'; Osew (yellow card) 57'; Chislett (yellow card) 68'; Assal (yellow card) 90+5'	Report	Pritchard 35'; Winchester (yellow card) 45+1'; Clarke (yellow card) 54'; Matete (yellow card) 67'; Evans (yellow card) 75'; Wright (yellow card) 80'; Defoe (yellow card) 83'; Neil (yellow card) 90+1'	Stadium: Plough Lane; Attendance: 8,381 (1,200 away fans); Referee: Simon Mather

19 February 2022 33	Sunderland	1–2	Milton Keynes Dons	Sunderland
15:00 GMT	Evans (yellow card) 24'; Stewart 59'	Report	McEachran (yellow card) 24'; Eisa 48'; Wickham 78'; Harvie (yellow card) 90'	Stadium: Stadium of Light; Attendance: 30,451; Referee: Ollie Yates

22 February 2022 34	Sunderland	1–1	Burton Albion	Sunderland
19:45 GMT	Winchester (yellow card) 32'; Stewart 90+3'	Report	Shaughnessy (yellow card) 50'; Borthwick-Jackson 53'; Saydee (yellow card) 66'	Stadium: Stadium of Light; Attendance: 30,237; Referee: Robert Lewis

26 February 2022 35	Wigan Athletic	0–3	Sunderland	Wigan
15:00 GMT	Power (yellow card) 38'; Magennis (yellow card) 45+1'; Tilt (yellow card) 84'; Naylor (yellow card) 85'	Report	Wright 2'; Matete (yellow card) 8'; Stewart 38' (pen.), (yellow card) 82', (goal) 87' (pen.); Gooch (yellow card) 45+2'; Embleton (yellow card) 71'; Pritchard (yellow card) 77'; Cirkin (yellow card) 90+6'	Stadium: DW Stadium; Attendance: 20,136 (4,900 away fans); Referee: Sam Purkiss

5 March 2022 36	Charlton Athletic	0–0	Sunderland	Charlton, London
15:00 GMT	Lavelle (yellow card) 18'; Lee (yellow card) 40'; Dobson (yellow card) 73'; Purrington (yellow card) 78'	Report	Cirkin (yellow card) 84'; Wright (yellow card) 90+5'	Stadium: The Valley; Attendance: 13,716 (2,950 away fans); Referee: Anthony Backhouse

8 March 2022 37	Sunderland	3–1	Fleetwood Town	Sunderland
19:45 GMT	Evans (yellow card) 22'; Embleton 55'; Cirkin (yellow card) 75'; O'Nien 82'; Clarke 90+1'	Report	Harrison 28'; Jules (yellow card) 76' (yellow-red card) 87'	Stadium: Stadium of Light; Attendance: 28,017; Referee: Sam Barrott

12 March 2022 38	Sunderland	2–0	Crewe Alexandra	Sunderland
15:00 GMT	Gooch (yellow card) 29'; Wright (yellow card) 74'; Cirkin (yellow card) 75'; Neil 84'; Roberts 86'; Dajaku (yellow card) 90+1'; Clarke (yellow card) 90+6'	Report	Williams (yellow card) 66'; Lundstram (yellow card) 68'; Lowery (yellow card) 76'	Stadium: Stadium of Light; Attendance: 30,036; Referee: Neil Hair

19 March 2022 39	Lincoln City	0–0	Sunderland	Lincoln
15:00 GMT	Walsh (yellow card) 50'; McGrandles (yellow card) 87'	Report	Evans (yellow card) 39'	Stadium: LNER Stadium; Attendance: 10,346 (2,000 away fans); Referee: Craig Hicks

2 April 2022 40	Sunderland	1–0	Gillingham	Sunderland
15:00 BST	Cirkin (yellow card) 45+3'; Broadhead 90+5' (yellow card) 90+6'	Report	Lee (yellow card) 38'; Tutonda (yellow card) 40'; Chambers (yellow card) 41'; Reeves (yellow card) 78'	Stadium: Stadium of Light; Attendance: 31,619; Referee: Oliver Langford

9 April 2022 41	Oxford United	1–2	Sunderland	Littlemore
15:00 BST	Moore 35'	Report	Evans 16'; Matete (yellow card) 73'; Cirkin (yellow card) 81'; Embleton 89'	Stadium: The Kassam Stadium; Attendance: 11,690 (1,800 away fans); Referee: Ben Toner

15 April 2022 42	Sunderland	3–2	Shrewsbury Town	Sunderland
15:00 BST	Embleton 4'; Broadhead 13', 90+2'; Clarke (yellow card) 22'; O'Nien (yellow card) 88'	Report	Bennett (yellow card) 28'; Vela 50' (yellow card) 90+6'; Flanagan 58'; Bowman (yellow card) 90+1'	Stadium: Stadium of Light; Attendance: 33,896; Referee: Darren Bond

18 April 2022 43	Plymouth Argyle	0–0	Sunderland	Plymouth
15:00 BST	Sessegnon (yellow card) 90+2'	Report	Cirkin (yellow card) 59'; Evans (yellow card) 84'	Stadium: Home Park; Attendance: 15,800 (1,800 away fans); Referee: Carl Brook

23 April 2022 44	Sunderland	5–1	Cambridge United	Sunderland
15:00 BST	Stewart 13' (pen.) 36'; Embleton 29'; Broadhead 53'; Batth 72'	Report	Jones (red card) 12'; Iredale (yellow card) 13'; Smith (yellow card) 28'; Digby 30'	Stadium: Stadium of Light; Attendance: 32,500; Referee: Peter Wright

26 April 2022 45	Sunderland	1–1	Rotherham United	Sunderland
19:45 GMT	Matete (yellow card) 8'; Ihiekwe 88' (o.g.)	Report	Ihiekwe 17'; Rathbone (yellow card) 76'	Stadium: Stadium of Light; Attendance: 33,119; Referee: Robert Madley

30 April 2022 46	Morecambe	0–1	Sunderland	Morecambe
12:30 BST	Phillips (yellow card) 11'; Wildig (yellow card) 68'; Stockton (yellow card) 77'; Cooney (yellow card) 90+1'	Report	Broadhead 10'; Matete (yellow card) 90+2'	Stadium: The Mazuma Stadium; Attendance: 5,831 (1,800 away fans); Referee: Gavin Ward

==== Play-offs ====
Sunderland finished 5th in the regular 2021–22 EFL League One season, so were drawn against 4th placed Sheffield Wednesday in the Play-off Semi Final. The first leg took place at the Stadium of Light and the second leg took place at Hillsborough.

6 May 2022 Semi-final, first leg	Sunderland	1–0	Sheffield Wednesday	Sunderland
19:45 BST	Stewart 45+1'; O'Nien (yellow card) 63'	Report	Luongo (yellow card) 52'	Stadium: Stadium of Light; Attendance: 44,742; Referee: Matt Donohue

9 May 2022 Semi-final, second leg	Sheffield Wednesday	1–1 (1–2 agg.)	Sunderland	Owlerton
19:45 BST	Byers (yellow card) 24'; Bannan (yellow card) 27'; Gregory 74'; Dean (yellow card) 77'	Report	Stewart (yellow card) 45+1'; Roberts 90+3'; Matete (yellow card) 90+11'	Stadium: Hillsborough Stadium; Attendance: 32,978; Referee: James Linington

21 May 2022 Final	Sunderland	2–0	Wycombe Wanderers	Wembley
15:00 BST	Embleton 12'; Cirkin (yellow card) 46'; Pritchard (yellow card) 75'; Stewart 79'	Report		Stadium: Wembley Stadium; Attendance: 72,332; Referee: Simon Hooper

=== FA Cup ===
Sunderland were drawn at home to Mansfield Town in the first round.

6 November 2021 First round	Sunderland	0–1	Mansfield Town	Sunderland
15:00 GMT	Evans (yellow card) 31'; Wright (yellow card) 50'	Report	Oates 5'; Hewitt (yellow card) 48'; Charsley (yellow card) 60'; Quinn (yellow card) 80'	Stadium: Stadium of Light; Attendance: 8,620; Referee: James Oldham

=== EFL Cup ===
Sunderland were drawn away to Port Vale, Blackpool, Wigan Athletic, Queens Park Rangers and Arsenal in the first, second, third and fourth rounds and quarter final respectively.

10 August 2021 First round	Port Vale	1–2	Sunderland	Burslem
19:45 BST	Worrall (yellow card) 49'; Walker (yellow card) 59'; Proctor 67'; Amoo (yellow card) 89'	Report	Diamond (yellow card) 21'; Hawkes 40'; O'Brien 50' (pen.); Taylor (yellow card) 55'; Doyle (yellow card) 86'; Younger (yellow card) 89'	Stadium: Vale Park; Attendance: 3,267; Referee: Sam Allison

24 August 2021 Second round	Blackpool	2–3	Sunderland	Blackpool
19:45 BST	Lavery 9'; Bowler 87'	Report	O'Brien 12', 57', 90+1'	Stadium: Bloomfield Road; Attendance: 5,756; Referee: Peter Wright

21 September 2021 Third round	Wigan Athletic	0–2	Sunderland	Wigan
19:45 BST	Edwards (yellow card) 56'	Report	Broadhead 26'; O'Nien (yellow card) 45+1', (goal) 54'; Evans (yellow card) 81'; Embleton (yellow card) 82'	Stadium: DW Stadium; Attendance: 6,511; Referee: Leigh Doughty

26 October 2021 Fourth round	Queens Park Rangers	0–0 (1–3 p)	Sunderland	Shepherd's Bush
19:45 BST	de Wijs (yellow card) 15'	Report	O'Nien (yellow card) 17'; Gooch (yellow card) 39'; Stewart (yellow card) 90+4'	Stadium: Kiyan Prince Foundation Stadium; Attendance: 15,372; Referee: Keith Stroud
	Penalties
	Austin (penalty missed); Chair (penalty missed); Dykes (penalty scored); Barbet (penalty missed)		(penalty scored) McGeady; (penalty scored) Stewart; (penalty scored) Pritchard

21 December 2021 Quarter-finals	Arsenal	5–1	Sunderland	Holloway
19:45 GMT	Nketiah 17', 49', 58'; Pépé 27'; Balogun (yellow card) 54'; Patino 90+1'	Report	Gooch (yellow card) 20'; Broadhead 31'; Hume (yellow card) 60'; Wright (yellow card) 76'; Doyle (yellow card) 85'	Stadium: Emirates Stadium; Attendance: 59,027; Referee: Robert Jones

=== EFL Trophy ===
Sunderland were drawn into Northern Group F alongside Bradford City, Lincoln City and Manchester United U21s. Two of the three group games were confirmed on July 22.

Pos	Div	Team	Pld	W	PW	PL	L	GF	GA	GD	Pts	Qualification
1	L1	Sunderland	3	2	0	1	0	5	3	+2	7	Advance to Round 2
2	L1	Lincoln City	3	2	0	0	1	7	4	+3	6	Advance to Round 2
3	ACA	Manchester United U21	3	1	0	0	2	6	5	+1	3	
4	L2	Bradford City	3	0	1	0	2	1	7	−6	2	

Source: EFL.com

5 October 2021 Group Game 1	Lincoln City	1–2	Sunderland	Lincoln
19:00 BST	Montsma (yellow card) 56', (goal) 90+4'	Report	Neil 2'; Wearne 72'	Stadium: LNER Stadium; Attendance: 3,060; Referee: Scott Oldham

13 October 2021 Group Game 2	Sunderland	2–1	Manchester United U21	Sunderland
19:00 BST	Almond (yellow card) 16'; Dyce 50', (yellow card) 76'; Wearne 66'	Report	Iqbal 57'	Stadium: Stadium of Light; Attendance: 3,960; Referee: Ross Joyce

9 November 2021 Group Game 3	Sunderland	1–1 (2–4 p)	Bradford City	Sunderland
19:00 GMT	Gooch (yellow card) 7'; Pritchard (yellow card) 44'; Broadhead 52'	Report	Robinson 36'; Scales (yellow card) 66'	Stadium: Stadium of Light; Referee: Simon Mather
	Penalties
	Pritchard (penalty missed); O'Nien (penalty scored); Harris (penalty scored); Gooch (penalty missed)		Watt (penalty missed); Cooke (penalty scored); Sutton (penalty scored); Scales (penalty scored); Evans (penalty scored)

1 December 2021 Round 2	Sunderland	0–1	Oldham Athletic	Sunderland
19:00 GMT		Report	Piergianni (yellow card) 16'; Adams (yellow card) 27'; Vaughan 53'; Clarke (yellow card) 78'	Stadium: Stadium of Light; Attendance: 3,498; Referee: Tom Reeves

== Player statistics ==
=== Appearance summary ===
As of match(es) played on 21 May 2022

No.	Pos	Nat	Player	Total		League One		FA Cup		EFL Cup		EFL Trophy		Play-Offs	
No.	Pos	Nat	Player	Apps	Goals	Apps	Goals	Apps	Goals	Apps	Goals	Apps	Goals	Apps	Goals
Goalkeepers
1	GK	(England) ENG	Lee Burge	9	0	3+0	0	1+0	0	3+0	0	2+0	0	0+0	0
20	GK	(England) ENG	Anthony Patterson	25	0	20+0	0	0+0	0	2+0	0	0+0	0	3+0	0
31	GK	(England) ENG	Jacob Carney	1	0	0+0	0	0+0	0	0+0	0	1+0	0	0+0	0
39	GK	(Germany) GER	Ron-Thorben Hoffmann	24	0	23+0	0	0+0	0	0+0	0	1+0	0	0+0	0
Defenders
2	DF	(Wales) WAL	Niall Huggins	4	0	1+1	0	0+0	0	2+0	0	0+0	0	0+0	0
3	DF	(Northern Ireland) NIR	Tom Flanagan	28	1	25+0	1	1+0	0	2+0	0	0+0	0	0+0	0
5	DF	(Denmark) DEN	Frederik Alves	10	0	0+3	0	1+0	0	3+0	0	3+0	0	0+0	0
5	DF	(England) ENG	Danny Batth	12	1	8+1	1	0+0	0	0+0	0	0+0	0	3+0	0
6	DF	(England) ENG	Callum Doyle	44	1	34+3	1	0+0	0	1+3	0	0+0	0	0+3	0
17	DF	(England) ENG	Dennis Cirkin	41	0	31+3	0	1+0	0	2+1	0	0+0	0	3+0	0
19	DF	(Kosovo) KOS	Arbenit Xhemajli	4	0	3+0	0	0+0	0	0+0	0	0+1	0	0+0	0
25	DF	(England) ENG	Oliver Younger	5	0	0+0	0	0+0	0	1+0	0	4+0	0	0+0	0
26	DF	(Australia) AUS	Bailey Wright	46	2	28+9	2	1+0	0	5+0	0	0+0	0	3+0	0
30	DF	(Scotland) SCO	Patrick Almond	1	0	0+0	0	0+0	0	0+0	0	1+0	0	0+0	0
32	DF	(Northern Ireland) NIR	Trai Hume	3	0	3+0	0	0+0	0	0+0	0	0+0	0	0+0	0
33	DF	(England) ENG	Denver Hume	8	0	0+4	0	0+0	0	1+1	0	2+0	0	0+0	0
41	DF	(England) ENG	Kenton Richardson	3	0	0+0	0	0+0	0	0+0	0	3+0	0	0+0	0
42	DF	(Zimbabwe) ZIM	Ethan Kachosa	2	0	0+0	0	0+0	0	0+0	0	1+1	0	0+0	0
58	DF	(England) ENG	Zac Johnson	1	0	0+0	0	0+0	0	0+0	0	0+1	0	0+0	0
Midfielders
4	MF	(Northern Ireland) NIR	Corry Evans	39	2	26+6	2	1+0	0	2+1	0	0+0	0	3+0	0
8	MF	(England) ENG	Elliot Embleton	47	9	26+12	8	1+0	0	1+2	0	2+1	0	1+1	1
11	MF	(United States) USA	Lynden Gooch	45	0	33+5	0	0+1	0	2+0	0	1+0	0	3+0	0
13	MF	(England) ENG	Luke O'Nien	35	4	24+2	3	0+1	0	3+0	1	1+1	0	3+0	0
15	MF	(Northern Ireland) NIR	Carl Winchester	45	3	39+1	3	0+1	0	3+0	0	0+1	0	0+0	0
18	MF	(England) ENG	Ellis Taylor	4	0	0+0	0	0+0	0	1+0	0	2+1	0	0+0	0
21	MF	(England) ENG	Alex Pritchard	47	4	25+11	4	0+1	0	4+1	0	2+0	0	3+0	0
23	MF	(England) ENG	Jack Diamond	4	0	1+2	0	0+0	0	1+0	0	0+0	0	0+0	0
24	MF	(England) ENG	Dan Neil	46	4	31+8	3	1+0	0	4+1	0	1+0	1	0+0	0
25	MF	(England) ENG	Jack Clarke	19	1	9+7	1	0+0	0	0+0	0	0+0	0	2+1	0
27	MF	(England) ENG	Josh Hawkes	2	1	0+1	0	0+0	0	1+0	1	0+0	0	0+0	0
27	MF	(England) ENG	Jay Matete	16	0	12+2	0	0+0	0	0+0	0	0+0	0	0+2	0
28	MF	(Republic of Ireland) IRL	Aiden McGeady	16	3	12+2	3	0+0	0	0+2	0	0+0	0	0+0	0
34	MF	(England) ENG	Tyrese Dyce	2	1	0+0	0	0+0	0	0+0	0	2+0	1	0+0	0
36	MF	(Scotland) SCO	Cieran Dunne	1	0	0+0	0	0+0	0	0+0	0	1+0	0	0+0	0
43	MF	(England) ENG	Harrison Sohna	3	0	0+0	0	0+0	0	0+0	0	3+0	0	0+0	0
46	MF	(England) ENG	Sam Wilding	1	0	0+0	0	0+0	0	0+0	0	1+0	0	0+0	0
51	MF	(England) ENG	Tom Scott	1	0	0+0	0	0+0	0	0+0	0	1+0	0	0+0	0
60	MF	(England) ENG	Caden Kelly	1	0	0+0	0	0+0	0	0+0	0	0+1	0	0+0	0
77	MF	(England) ENG	Patrick Roberts	16	2	6+7	1	0+0	0	0+0	0	0+0	0	3+0	1
Forwards
7	FW	(Germany) GER	Leon Dajaku	27	4	14+8	4	1+0	0	2+0	0	2+0	0	0+0	0
9	FW	(Wales) WAL	Nathan Broadhead	27	13	15+5	10	1+0	0	3+0	2	1+0	1	0+2	0
10	FW	(Republic of Ireland) IRL	Aiden O'Brien	25	6	7+10	2	1+0	0	3+2	4	2+0	0	0+0	0
10	FW	(England) ENG	Jermain Defoe	7	0	2+5	0	0+0	0	0+0	0	0+0	0	0+0	0
14	FW	(Scotland) SCO	Ross Stewart	53	26	46+0	24	0+0	0	2+2	0	0+0	0	3+0	2
22	FW	(Northern Ireland) NIR	Will Grigg	1	0	0+0	0	0+0	0	1+0	0	0+0	0	0+0	0
37	FW	(England) ENG	Will Harris	8	0	0+3	0	0+0	0	1+0	0	3+1	0	0+0	0
45	FW	(England) ENG	Stephen Wearne	3	2	0+0	0	0+0	0	0+0	0	2+1	2	0+0	0
48	FW	(Sweden) SWE	Benjamin Mbunga-Kimpioka	4	1	0+2	1	0+0	0	0+1	0	1+0	0	0+0	0

=== Goals record ===
As of match(es) played on 21 May 2022

Rank	No.	Nat.	Po.	Name	League One	FA Cup	EFL Cup	EFL Trophy	Play-Offs	Total
1	14	(Scotland)	ST	Ross Stewart	24	0	0	0	2	26
2	9	(Wales)	ST	Nathan Broadhead	10	0	2	1	0	13
3	8	(England)	AM	Elliot Embleton	8	0	0	0	1	9
4	10	(Republic of Ireland)	ST	Aiden O'Brien	2	0	4	0	0	6
5				Own goal	5	0	0	0	0	5
5	7	(Germany)	FW	Leon Dajaku	4	0	0	0	0	4
5	14	(England)	CM	Luke O'Nien	3	0	1	0	0	4
5	21	(England)	MF	Alex Pritchard	4	0	0	0	0	4
5	24	(England)	CM	Dan Neil	3	0	0	1	0	4
6	15	(Northern Ireland)	CM	Carl Winchester	3	0	0	0	0	3
6	28	(Republic of Ireland)	LW	Aiden McGeady	3	0	0	0	0	3
7	45	(England)	CM	Stephen Wearne	0	0	0	2	0	2
7	26	(Australia)	CB	Bailey Wright	2	0	0	0	0	2
7	4	(Northern Ireland)	MF	Corry Evans	2	0	0	0	0	2
7	77	(England)	MF	Patrick Roberts	1	0	0	0	1	2
8	3	(Northern Ireland)	CB	Tom Flanagan	1	0	0	0	0	2
8	5	(England)	DF	Danny Batth	1	0	0	0	0	2
8	6	(England)	DF	Callum Doyle	1	0	0	0	0	2
8	25	(England)	MF	Jack Clarke	1	0	0	0	0	2
8	48	(Sweden)	FW	Benjamin Mbunga-Kimpioka	1	0	0	0	0	1
8	27	(England)	AM	Josh Hawkes	0	0	1	0	0	1
8	34	(England)	DF	Tyrese Dyce	0	0	0	1	0	1
Total					79	0	8	5	4	96

=== Penalties record ===
As of match(es) played on 21 May 2022

Excludes penalties taken during Penalty shoot-outs.

Rank	No.	Nat.	Po.	Name	League One		FA Cup		EFL Cup		EFL Trophy		Play-Offs		Total		Conversion Ratio
Rank	No.	Nat.	Po.	Name	Scored	Missed	Scored	Missed	Scored	Missed	Scored	Missed	Scored	Missed	Scored	Missed	Conversion Ratio
1	14	(Scotland)	ST	Ross Stewart	4	1	0	0	0	0	0	0	0	0	4	1	80%
2	28	(Republic of Ireland)	LW	Aiden McGeady	3	0	0	0	0	0	0	0	0	0	3	0	100%
3	10	(Republic of Ireland)	ST	Aiden O'Brien	0	0	0	0	1	0	0	0	0	0	1	0	100%
4	11	(United States)	MF	Lynden Gooch	0	1	0	0	0	0	0	0	0	0	0	1	0%
Total					7	2	0	0	1	0	0	0	0	0	8	2	80%

=== Assists record ===
As of match(es) played on 21 May 2022

Rank	No.	Nat.	Po.	Name	League One	FA Cup	EFL Cup	EFL Trophy	Play-Offs	Total
1	21	(England)	MF	Alex Pritchard	7	0	3	0	2	12
2	24	(England)	CM	Dan Neil	7	0	1	0	0	8
2	8	(England)	AM	Elliot Embleton	6	0	1	1	0	8
3	11	(United States)	MF	Lynden Gooch	6	0	0	0	0	6
4	28	(Republic of Ireland)	LW	Aiden McGeady	4	0	0	0	0	4
5	10	(Republic of Ireland)	ST	Aiden O'Brien	1	0	0	2	0	3
5	7	(Germany)	FW	Leon Dajaku	3	0	0	0	0	3
5	6	(England)	DF	Callum Doyle	3	0	0	0	0	3
5	14	(Scotland)	ST	Ross Stewart	3	0	0	0	0	3
5	25	(England)	MF	Jack Clarke	2	0	0	0	1	3
6	17	(England)	DF	Dennis Cirkin	2	0	0	0	0	2
6	4	(Northern Ireland)	MF	Corry Evans	2	0	0	0	0	2
7	15	(Northern Ireland)	CM	Carl Winchester	1	0	0	0	0	1
7	14	(England)	CM	Luke O'Nien	1	0	0	0	0	1
7	3	(Northern Ireland)	CB	Tom Flanagan	1	0	0	0	0	1
7	26	(Australia)	CB	Bailey Wright	1	0	0	0	0	1
7	27	(England)	MF	Jay Matete	1	0	0	0	0	1
7	77	(England)	MF	Patrick Roberts	1	0	0	0	0	1
7	2	(Wales)	DF	Niall Huggins	0	0	1	0	0	1
7	23	(England)	MF	Jack Diamond	0	0	1	0	0	1
7	18	(England)	MF	Ellis Taylor	0	0	0	1	0	1
Total					52	0	7	4	3	66

=== Disciplinary record ===
As of match(es) played on 21 May 2022

Rank	No.	Nat.	Po.	Name	League One			FA Cup			EFL Cup			EFL Trophy			Play-Offs			Total		
Rank	No.	Nat.	Po.	Name	Booked	(yellow card) (yellow-red card)	Sent off (straight red)	Booked	(yellow card) (yellow-red card)	Sent off (straight red)	Booked	(yellow card) (yellow-red card)	Sent off (straight red)	Booked	(yellow card) (yellow-red card)	Sent off (straight red)	Booked	(yellow card) (yellow-red card)	Sent off (straight red)	Booked	(yellow card) (yellow-red card)	Sent off (straight red)
1	4	(Northern Ireland)	CM	Corry Evans	9	0	0	1	0	0	1	0	0	0	0	0	0	0	0	11	0	0
1	17	(England)	LB	Dennis Cirkin	10	0	0	0	0	0	0	0	0	0	0	0	1	0	0	11	0	0
2	11	(United States)	RW	Lynden Gooch	7	0	0	0	0	0	2	0	0	1	0	0	0	0	0	10	0	0
3	15	(Northern Ireland)	CM	Carl Winchester	8	0	1	0	0	0	0	0	0	0	0	0	0	0	0	8	0	1
4	3	(Northern Ireland)	CB	Tom Flanagan	8	0	0	0	0	0	0	0	0	0	0	0	0	0	0	8	0	0
4	13	(England)	CM	Luke O'Nien	5	0	0	0	0	0	2	0	0	0	0	0	1	0	0	8	0	0
4	14	(Scotland)	ST	Ross Stewart	6	0	0	0	0	0	1	0	0	0	0	0	1	0	0	8	0	0
5	8	(England)	AM	Elliot Embleton	5	0	1	0	0	0	1	0	0	0	0	0	0	0	0	6	0	1
5	26	(Australia)	DF	Bailey Wright	5	0	0	1	0	0	1	0	0	0	0	0	0	0	0	7	0	0
5	27	(England)	MF	Jay Matete	6	0	0	0	0	0	0	0	0	0	0	0	1	0	0	7	0	0
6	21	(England)	AM	Alex Pritchard	3	0	0	0	0	0	0	0	0	1	0	0	1	0	0	5	0	0
7	6	(England)	CB	Callum Doyle	2	0	0	0	0	0	2	0	0	0	0	0	0	0	0	4	0	0
7	24	(England)	MF	Dan Neil	4	0	0	0	0	0	0	0	0	0	0	0	0	0	0	4	0	0
7	25	(England)	MF	Jack Clarke	3	0	0	0	0	0	0	0	0	0	0	0	0	0	0	3	0	0
8	9	(Wales)	FW	Nathan Broadhead	2	0	0	0	0	0	0	0	0	0	0	0	0	0	0	2	0	0
9	18	(England)	LW	Ellis Taylor	0	0	0	0	0	0	1	0	0	0	0	0	0	0	0	1	0	0
9	23	(England)	RW	Jack Diamond	0	0	0	0	0	0	1	0	0	0	0	0	0	0	0	1	0	0
9	25	(England)	CB	Oliver Younger	0	0	0	0	0	0	1	0	0	0	0	0	0	0	0	1	0	0
9	28	(Republic of Ireland)	MF	Aiden McGeady	0	1	0	0	0	0	0	0	0	0	0	0	0	0	0	0	1	0
9	30	(England)	DF	Patrick Almond	0	0	0	0	0	0	0	0	0	1	0	0	0	0	0	1	0	0
9	34	(England)	DF	Tyrese Dyce	0	0	0	0	0	0	0	0	0	1	0	0	0	0	0	1	0	0
9	10	(Republic of Ireland)	ST	Aiden O'Brien	1	0	0	0	0	0	0	0	0	0	0	0	0	0	0	1	0	0
9	33	(England)	DF	Denver Hume	0	0	0	0	0	0	1	0	0	0	0	0	0	0	0	1	0	0
9	5	(England)	DF	Danny Batth	1	0	0	0	0	0	0	0	0	0	0	0	0	0	0	1	0	0
9	77	(England)	MF	Patrick Roberts	1	0	0	0	0	0	0	0	0	0	0	0	0	0	0	1	0	0
9	7	(Germany)	MF	Leon Dajaku	1	0	0	0	0	0	0	0	0	0	0	0	0	0	0	1	0	0
9	10	(England)	FW	Jermain Defoe	1	0	0	0	0	0	0	0	0	0	0	0	0	0	0	1	0	0
Total					88	1	2	2	0	0	14	0	0	4	0	0	5	0	0	113	1	2

== Transfers ==
=== Transfers in ===
Date	Position	Nationality	Name	From	Fee	Ref.
1 July 2021	CB	(England)	Cameron Jessup	(England) Crystal Palace	Free transfer	
1 July 2021	RB	(England)	Ethan Kachosa	(England) Leeds United	Free transfer	
1 July 2021	LB	(England)	Nathan Newall	(England) Guiseley	Free transfer	
1 July 2021	CM	(England)	Harrison Sohna	(England) Aston Villa	Free transfer	
1 July 2021	CM	(England)	Tom Scott	(England) Northampton Town	Free transfer	
1 July 2021	LW	(England)	Tyrese Dyce	(England) West Bromwich Albion	Free transfer	
2 July 2021	GK	(England)	Jacob Carney	(England) Manchester United	Free transfer	
9 July 2021	AM	(England)	Alex Pritchard	(England) Huddersfield Town	Free transfer	
15 July 2021	CM	(Northern Ireland)	Corry Evans	(England) Blackburn Rovers	Free transfer	
11 August 2021	LB	(England)	Dennis Cirkin	(England) Tottenham Hotspur	Undisclosed	
20 August 2021	LB	(Wales)	Niall Huggins	(England) Leeds United	Undisclosed	
26 August 2021	GK	(England)	Jack McIntyre	(England) Everton	Free transfer	
22 December 2021	MF	(England)	Nicky Gyimah	(England) Peterborough United	Undisclosed	
4 January 2022	RB	(Northern Ireland)	Trai Hume	(Northern Ireland) Linfield	Undisclosed	
18 January 2022	CB	(England)	Danny Batth	(England) Stoke City	Free transfer	
21 January 2022	RW	(England)	Patrick Roberts	(England) Manchester City	Undisclosed	
1 February 2022	ST	(England)	Jermain Defoe	(Scotland) Rangers	Free transfer	
1 February 2022	CM	(England)	Jay Matete	(England) Fleetwood Town	Undisclosed	
3 March 2022	DF	(England)	Ugonna Emenike	Free agent	—N/a	

=== Loans in ===
Date from	Position	Nationality	Name	From	Date until	Ref.
16 July 2021	CB	(England)	Callum Doyle	(England) Manchester City	End of season	
13 August 2021	CB	(Denmark)	Frederik Alves	(England) West Ham United	End of season (terminated in January 2022)	
16 August 2021	ST	(Wales)	Nathan Broadhead	(England) Everton	End of season	
31 August 2021	ST	(Germany)	Leon Dajaku	(Germany) Union Berlin	End of season	
31 August 2021	GK	(Germany)	Ron-Thorben Hoffmann	(Germany) Bayern Munich	End of season	
26 January 2022	RW	(England)	Jack Clarke	(England) Tottenham Hotspur	End of season	

=== Loans out ===
Date from	Position	Nationality	Name	To	Date until	Ref.
31 August 2021	RW	(England)	Jack Diamond	(England) Harrogate Town	End of season	
31 August 2021	ST	(Northern Ireland)	Will Grigg	(England) Rotherham United	End of season	
31 August 2021	AM	(England)	Josh Hawkes	(England) Tranmere Rovers	25 January 2022 (Note: On 25 January, Hawkes joined Tranmere on a permanent basis.)	
24 September 2021	GK	(England)	Anthony Patterson	(England) Notts County	20 November 2021 (Note: Anthony Patterson's loan at Notts County was extended by a further two months, but he was recalled on 20 November 2021 due to an injury to Lee Burge.)	
30 September 2021	CF	(Sweden)	Benjamin Mbunga-Kimpioka	(England) Southend United	28 October 2021	
12 November 2021	RB	(England)	Kenton Richardson	(England) Spennymoor Town	15 December 2021	
31 December 2021	GK	(England)	Anthony Patterson	(England) Notts County	End of the Season	
31 December 2021	CM	(England)	Sam Wilding	(England) Leamington FC	5 February 2022	
6 January 2022	CF	(England)	Will Harris	(England) Barrow	End of season	
7 January 2022	AM	(England)	Stephen Wearne	(England) Torquay United	End of season	
13 January 2022	GK	(England)	Jack McIntyre	(England) Radcliffe	10 February 2022	
14 January 2022	CB	(England)	Patrick Almond	(England) Blyth Spartans	End of season	
24 March 2022	LB	(England)	Tyrese Dyce	(England) Spennymoor Town	May 2022	
24 March 2022	DM	(England)	Sam Wilding	(England) South Shields	End of season	

=== Transfers out ===
Date	Position	Nationality	Name	To	Fee	Ref.
30 June 2021	CB	(Wales)	Bobby Beaumont	(Wales) Caernarfon Town	Released	
30 June 2021	ST	(Scotland)	Lee Connelly	(Scotland) Queen of the South	Released	
30 June 2021	ST	(England)	Mitchell Curry	(United States) Inter Miami	Released	
30 June 2021	CM	(England)	Jake Hackett	(England) Whitby Town	Released	
30 June 2021	CM	(England)	Grant Leadbitter	Retired	Retired	
30 June 2021	RW	(Scotland)	Chris Maguire	(England) Lincoln City	Released	
30 June 2021	GK	(England)	Remi Matthews	(England) Crystal Palace	Released	
30 June 2021	LB	(Scotland)	Callum McFadzean	(England) Crewe Alexandra	Released	
30 June 2021	RB	(Northern Ireland)	Conor McLaughlin	(England) Fleetwood Town	Released	
30 June 2021	CM	(England)	Max Power	(England) Wigan Athletic	Released	
30 June 2021	CM	(England)	Josh Scowen	(England) Wycombe Wanderers	Released	
30 June 2021	CB	(England)	Brandon Taylor	(England) Darlington	Released	
30 June 2021	RW	(England)	Ryan Wombwell	(England) Gateshead	Released	
1 July 2021	DM	(England)	George Dobson	(England) Charlton Athletic	Mutual consent	
7 July 2021	ST	(England)	Charlie Wyke	(England) Wigan Athletic	Free transfer	
16 July 2021	GK	(England)	Oliver Basey	(England) Birmingham City	Free transfer	
20 September 2021	LW	(England)	Francis Okoronkwo	(England) Everton	Undisclosed	
19 January 2022	CB	(England)	Ollie Younger	(England) Doncaster Rovers	Undisclosed	
25 January 2022	LM	(England)	Josh Hawkes	(England) Tranmere Rovers	Undisclosed	
26 January 2022	LB	(England)	Denver Hume	(England) Portsmouth	Undisclosed	
31 January 2022	CB	(Northern Ireland)	Tom Flanagan	(England) Shrewsbury Town	Undisclosed	
31 January 2022	LW	(Republic of Ireland)	Aiden O'Brien	(England) Portsmouth	Undisclosed	
24 March 2022	CF	(England)	Jermain Defoe	Retired		
31 March 2022	CF	(Sweden)	Benjamin Mbunga-Kimpioka	(Sweden) AIK	Undisclosed	
