= 2022 EFL League One play-off final =

Association football match

- Wembley Stadium in London hosted the final.
Wycombe Wanderers	Sunderland
0	2
- Date: 21 May 2022
- Venue: Wembley Stadium, London
- Man of the Match: Alex Pritchard
- Referee: Simon Hooper (Wiltshire)
- Attendance: 72,332

The 2022 EFL League One play-off final was an association football match between Wycombe Wanderers and Sunderland on 21 May 2022 at Wembley Stadium, London. It was to determine the third and final team to gain promotion from EFL League One, the third tier of English football, to the EFL Championship. The top two teams of 2021–22 EFL League One, Wigan Athletic and Rotherham United, gained automatic promotion to the Championship, while the clubs placed from third to sixth place in the table took part in the 2022 English Football League play-offs. The winners of the play-off semi-finals competed for the final place for the 2022–23 season in the Championship.

Simon Hooper was the referee for the match. The video assistant referee (VAR) was used for the first time. It was played in front of 72,332 spectators. Sunderland took the lead in the 12th minute with a goal from Elliot Embleton. Ross Stewart doubled his side's lead in with 11 minutes of the match remaining to make it 2–0. That remained the scoreline, and Sunderland gained promotion to the Championship. Sunderland's Alex Pritchard was named man of the match.

== Route to the final ==
EFL League One final table, leading positions
Pos	Team	Pld	W	D	L	GF	GA	GD	Pts
1	Wigan Athletic (C, P)	46	27	11	8	82	44	+38	92
2	Rotherham United (P)	46	27	9	10	70	33	+37	90
3	Milton Keynes Dons (Q)	46	26	11	9	78	44	+34	89
4	Sheffield Wednesday (Q)	46	24	13	9	78	50	+28	85
5	Sunderland (P, O)	46	24	12	10	79	53	+26	84
6	Wycombe Wanderers (Q)	46	23	14	9	75	51	+24	83
7	Plymouth Argyle	46	23	11	12	68	48	+20	80

(C) Champions; (O) Play-off winners; (P) Promoted; (Q) Qualified for the phase indicated

Sunderland finished the regular 2021–22 season in fifth place in EFL League One, the third tier of the English football league system, one place and one point ahead of Wycombe Wanderers. Both, therefore, missed out on the two automatic places for promotion to the EFL Championship and instead took part in the play-offs to determine the third promoted team. Sunderland finished six points behind Rotherham United (who were promoted in second place) and eight behind league winners Wigan Athletic.

Wycombe Wanderers faced Milton Keynes Dons and the first leg was played at Adams Park in High Wycombe on 5 May 2022. Seven minutes before half-time, Wycombe Wanderers took the lead when Ryan Tafazolli scored from close range with a header from a Joe Jacobson corner. Sam Vokes then put the ball into Milton Keynes Dons' goal but it was disallowed, and the half ended 1–0. Midway through the second half, Josh McEachran was sent off after being shown two yellow cards within seven minutes, reducing the visiting side to ten players. Jason McCarthy's shot then hit the Milton Keynes Dons' crossbar before Vokes doubled Wycombe Wanderers' lead in the 82nd minute with a header from a Garath McCleary cross, and the match ended 2–0. The second leg took place three days later at Stadium MK in Milton Keynes. Troy Parrott gave the home side the lead in the 26th minute with a header from Hiram Boateng's cross. Although Milton Keynes Dons dominated the match throughout, they were unable to score a second goal and the match ended 1–0, with Wycombe advancing to the final with a 2–1 win on aggregate.

In the second play-off semi-final, Sunderland's opposition was Sheffield Wednesday, with the first match of the two-legged tie taking place at the Stadium of Light in Sunderland on 6 May 2022. The game remained goalless until injury time in the first half when Ross Stewart took the ball from Sam Hutchinson before scoring from a tight angle, his 25th goal of the season. Seven minutes into the second half, Alex Pritchard struck the ball against the Sheffield Wednesday crossbar and despite pressure from the away side in the final 20 minutes, the game ended 1–0. The 44,742 spectators set the record for the highest attendance at any play-off semi-final in the history of the post-season games. The second leg took place three days later at Hillsborough Stadium in Sheffield. The first half ended goalless before Sheffield Wednesday took the lead and levelled the tie in the 74th minute: Barry Bannan passed to Marvin Johnson whose cross was struck into the Sunderland goal from close range by Lee Gregory. Sheffield Wednesday began to dominate the match but three minutes into second-half injury time, Jack Clarke passed to Patrick Roberts who scored from close range. The match ended 1–1 and Sunderland progressed to the final with a 2–1 aggregate victory. Their win meant they went to the final having been undefeated in their previous 15 games.

== Match ==
=== Background ===
This was Sunderland's fourth play-off final, having lost all three of their previous finals, but they went into the match unbeaten in their previous fifteen matches. In the 1998 Football League First Division play-off final, they faced Charlton Athletic at the old Wembley Stadium in London, in a match described by Rob Stevens of the BBC as "arguably the best play-off final in English Football League history". That final ended 3–3 in regular time, 4–4 after extra time, and Sunderland lost the resulting penalty shoot-out 7–6. Sunderland's most recent play-off final ended in a 2–1 defeat to Charlton Athletic in 2019. Sunderland had also played in the 1990 Football League Second Division play-off final against Swindon Town which they lost 1–0. They were promoted however, as Swindon were later found guilty of financial misconduct. Sunderland had last played in the Championship in the 2017–18 season, when they were relegated to League One after finishing bottom of the league. Their most recent visit to Wembley Stadium came in the previous season, when they won the EFL Trophy, marking their first victory at the national stadium since the 1973 FA Cup Final. Wycombe Wanderers also made their fourth play-off final appearance. They won the 1994 Football League Third Division play-off final 4–2 against Preston North End before losing to Southend United in the 2015 Football League Two play-off final in a penalty shoot-out. Their most recent play-off final came in 2020, when they defeated Oxford United 2–1 in the EFL League One play-off final to secure promotion to the EFL Championship. They were relegated the following season back to League One.

In the matches between the sides during the regular season, Sunderland won 3–1 at the Stadium of Light in August 2021 and the fixture at Adams Park the following January ended in a 3–3 draw. Ross Stewart was Sunderland's top scorer with 24 goals during the regular season, while Vokes had scored the most goals for Wycombe Wanderers with 17. The final was refereed by Simon Hooper (representing the Wiltshire Football Association), with Adam Crysell and Craig Taylor as his assistants, and Tim Robinson the fourth official. In May 2022, the EFL had announced that for the first time, the video assistant referee system would be used at all play-off finals, and Lee Mason was appointed in this role. Sunderland received an initial allocation of 37,480 tickets for the final which was subsequently increased to 43,960 due to high demand. Wycombe Wanderers were initially given 19,205 tickets and applied for an extra allocation. By 18 May 2022, the club announced that they had sold more than 22,000 tickets for the final.

Sunderland's head coach Alex Neil made one change for his side's starting line-up from the second leg of their play-off semi-final, with Elliot Embleton being selected ahead of Jack Clarke. Gareth Ainsworth, the Wycombe Wanderers head coach, announced a side unchanged from the previous match.

=== Summary ===
Wycombe Wanderers kicked off the match at around 3 p.m. on 21 May 2022 in front of 72,332 supporters at Wembley Stadium. Four minutes in, Pritchard took a free kick which hit the side netting of the Wycombe Wanderers' goal. In the 12th minute, Embleton took possession of the ball around half-way and dribbled forward uncontested to take a shot from outside the Wycombe Wanderers' penalty area which beat David Stockdale to give Sunderland a 1–0 lead. There were chances to score for both sides, including a shot in the 22nd minute from Pritchard which was caught by Stockdale. Five minutes later, Ross Stewart's shot was pushed away by Anthony Patterson. In the 36th minute, Sunderland had appeals for a penalty turned down by the referee after contact from Jacobson on Roberts; instead Roberts was called for offside. The last chance of the half fell to Wycombe Wanderers' Anthony Stewart but he headed Jacobsen's free kick wide of the goal and the half ended 1–0 to Sunderland.

Neither side made any changes to their playing personnel during the interval and Sunderland kicked the second half off. A minute in, Sunderland's Dennis Cirkin was shown a yellow card for a foul but the resulting free kick was cleared. Wycombe Wanderers dominated the early stages of the half before Ross Stewart's 52nd minute header from a Pritchard cross passed just wide of the goalpost. In the 56th minute, Wycombe Wanderers made their first substitution of the match with Daryl Horgan being replaced by Lewis Wing. Three minutes later, a mistake from Sunderland's Bailey Wright allowed Vokes to shoot but his attempt was saved by Patterson. Sunderland made their first substitution in the 61st minute when Embleton was replaced by Jack Clarke. Four minutes after that, Wycombe Wanderers' Jordan Obita was substituted for Brandon Hanlan. Midway through the second half, Sunderland's Robert was tackled in the penalty area by Jacobsen and Anthony Stewart but no penalty was awarded. With fourteen minutes of the match remaining, Wycombe Wanderers made their final substitution with Adebayo Akinfenwa coming on in place of Dominic Gape. In the 78th minute, Hanlon's weak shot was saved before Sunderland doubled their lead through Ross Stewart. Pritchard passed him the ball outside the Wycombe penalty area, before Ross Stewart moved to his right and scoring with a low shot. Two minutes later, Pritchard was replaced for Sunderland by Callum Doyle. Ross Stewart then took the ball past Tafazolli but his shot was wide of the Wycombe Wanderers' goal. Roberts then shot wide for Sunderland before Patterson saved a strike from Anthony Stewart. With two minutes of the regular time remaining, Ross Stewart was taken off by Sunderland and replaced by Nathan Broadhead. Five minutes of stoppage time were indicated by the fourth official, but there was no change to the score and Sunderland won the match 2–0.

=== Details ===
21 May 2022
15:00 BST

Wycombe Wanderers	0–2	Sunderland
	Report	Embleton 12'; Stewart 79'

Wembley Stadium, London
Attendance: 72,332
Referee: Simon Hooper

Wycombe Wanderers	Sunderland

GK	13	(England) David Stockdale
RB	26	(England) Jason McCarthy
CB	5	(England) Anthony Stewart
CB	6	(England) Ryan Tafazolli
LB	3	(Wales) Joe Jacobson (c)
CM	28	(England) Josh Scowen
CM	17	(Republic of Ireland) Daryl Horgan	(substituted off) 55'
RW	12	(Jamaica) Garath McCleary
AM	4	(England) Dominic Gape	(substituted off) 75'
LW	23	(England) Jordan Obita	(substituted off) 65'
CF	9	(Wales) Sam Vokes
Substitutes:
MF	11	(England) Lewis Wing	(substituted on) 55'
FW	18	(England) Brandon Hanlan	(substituted on) 65'
FW	20	(England) Adebayo Akinfenwa	(substituted on) 75'
Head Coach:
(England) Gareth Ainsworth

GK	20	(England) Anthony Patterson
RB	11	(United States) Lynden Gooch
CB	26	(Australia) Bailey Wright
CB	5	(England) Danny Batth
LB	17	(England) Dennis Cirkin	(yellow card) 46'
CM	4	(Northern Ireland) Corry Evans (c)
CM	13	(England) Luke O'Nien
RW	77	(England) Patrick Roberts
AM	21	(England) Alex Pritchard	(yellow card) 75'	(substituted off) 81'
LW	8	(England) Elliot Embleton		(substituted off) 61'
CF	14	(Scotland) Ross Stewart		(substituted off) 88'
Substitutes:
MF	25	(England) Jack Clarke		(substituted on) 61'
DF	6	(England) Callum Doyle		(substituted on) 81'
FW	9	(Wales) Nathan Broadhead		(substituted on) 88'
Head Coach:
(Scotland) Alex Neil

Statistics
	Wycombe Wanderers	Sunderland
Possession	50%	50%
Goals scored	0	2
Shots on target	3	5
Shots off target	3	8
Fouls committed	8	9
Corner kicks	1	4
Yellow cards	0	2
Red cards	0	0

== Reaction ==
Sunderland's head coach Neil said that he believed his side deserved the victory: "Wycombe have done great this season but we came into the game knowing a lot of people had heavily backed us and made us favourites. As I said before the game, that’s normal for us. This club shouldn't be where it is and this is the first step towards us getting back to where we want to be." Ainsworth was gracious in defeat and conceded that his side was second-best: "The better team won today. I can't stand here and pretend we were better than Sunderland but I thought at 1–0 there was a few nerves from them and we had a couple of good chances, but they’ve got some good players. Congratulations Sunderland, you deserve to be in the Championship next season." Sunderland's Pritchard was named as man of the match.
