= Elliot Embleton =

English footballer

Personal information
- Full name: Elliot John Embleton
- Date of birth: 2 April 1999 (age 27)
- Place of birth: Durham, England
- Height: 1.80 m (5 ft 11 in)
- Position: Midfielder

Team information
- Current team: Carlisle United
- Number: 14

Youth career
- 2005–2017: Sunderland

Senior career*
Years	Team	Apps	(Gls)
2017–2024	Sunderland	75	(10)
2018–2019	→ Grimsby Town (loan)	27	(3)
2021	→ Blackpool (loan)	18	(1)
2023–2024	→ Derby County (loan)	1	(0)
2024–2025	Blackpool	15	(0)
2025–	Carlisle United	31	(2)

International career^{‡}
2015–2016	England U17	11	(1)
2016–2017	England U18	10	(0)
2017–2018	England U19	13	(4)
2017–2019	England U20	10	(2)
- * Club domestic league appearances and goals as of 17:56, 11 June 2026 (UTC) ‡ National team caps and goals as of 02:15, 31 March 2019 (UTC)

Elliot John Embleton (born 2 April 1999) is an English professional footballer who plays as a midfielder for Carlisle United. He has also played for Sunderland and Blackpool, with loan spells spent at Grimsby Town, Blackpool and Derby County, and has represented England from under-17 to under-20 level.

== Club career ==
=== Sunderland ===
Embleton was named on the bench on six occasions during the 2016–17 Premier League, having featured many times for the under-23 side. His first-team debut came on 9 December 2017 as an injury-time substitute for Lynden Gooch in a goalless draw with Wolverhampton Wanderers.

On 30 August 2018, Embleton joined Grimsby Town on loan until January 2019. He established himself as a regular starter for the Lincolnshire side, scoring four goals during this period, and on 2 January 2019 the two clubs announced an extension of the loan to the end of the 2018–19 season.

On 1 February 2021, Embleton joined League One side Blackpool on loan for the remainder of the 2020–21 season.

He scored his first goal for Sunderland in a 2–1 win at Milton Keynes Dons on 14 August 2021.

Embleton scored the first of Sunderland's goals in the 2–0 win over Wycombe Wanderers in the 2022 EFL League One play-off final that secured promotion to the EFL Championship.

He played in Sunderland's first 23 games in the Championship in the 2022–23 season, scoring twice before his season was cut short in December after ankle ligament damage in a match against Hull City, an incident for which he got sent off. It was not until September 2023, a month into the following season, when he was fit enough to be in consideration for first-team action.

On 1 September 2023, Embleton joined League One club Derby County on a season-long loan. He made his debut for the club on 16 September 2023, in a 1–1 draw at home to Portsmouth as a 38th-minute substitute. Embleton started Derby's EFL Trophy tie against Lincoln City on 19 September 2023, playing 59 minutes. On 22 September 2023, he picked up an injury whilst taking a corner kick in a light training session on the eve of Derby's match at Carlisle United. On 28 September 2023, Derby head coach Paul Warne confirmed that Embleton had torn his quadriceps and would be out for "three to six months". Warne said the injury may require surgery. Embleton returned to Sunderland for his rehabilitation, with Derby keeping their contribution of the player's wages going until January, but the loan deal was effectively over. The loan was officially terminated on 10 January 2024.

=== Blackpool ===
He rejoined Blackpool on a permanent basis in August 2024 for an undisclosed fee.

=== Carlisle United ===
Embleton joined Carlisle United for an undisclosed fee on 2 January 2025.

== International career ==
Embleton has represented England from under-17 to under-20 level. In May 2017, Embleton was included in an England U20 squad for the 2017 Toulon Tournament. He scored in the semi-final against Scotland. In the final, Embleton converted his penalty during the shoot-out as England defeated Ivory Coast to win the tournament.

In July 2018, Embleton was included in the England U19 squad for the 2018 UEFA European Under-19 Championship. He scored in the opening group match against Turkey.

== Career statistics ==
As of match played 19 September 2023

Appearances and goals by club, season and competition
Club	Season	League			FA Cup		League Cup		Other		Total	
Club	Season	Division	Apps	Goals	Apps	Goals	Apps	Goals	Apps	Goals	Apps	Goals
Sunderland U23	2016–17	—			—		—		2 (Note: Appearance(s) in EFL Trophy)	1	2	1
Sunderland	2017–18	Championship	2	0	1	0	0	0	—		3	0
Sunderland	2018–19	League One	0	0	0	0	1	0	0	0	1	0
Sunderland	2019–20	League One	3	0	0	0	2	0	0	0	5	0
Sunderland	2020–21	League One	9	0	1	0	0	0	2	0	12	0
Sunderland	2021–22	League One	38	8	1	0	3	0	5 (Note: Three appearances in EFL Trophy; two appearances one goal in League One play-offs)	1	47	9
Sunderland	2022–23	Championship	23	2	0	0	1	0	0	0	24	2
Sunderland	2023–24	Championship	0	0	—		0	0	—		0	0
Sunderland	Total		75	10	3	0	7	0	7	1	92	11
Grimsby Town (loan)	2018–19	League Two	27	3	3	1	0	0	0	0	30	4
Blackpool (loan)	2020–21	League One	18	1	0	0	0	0	3 (Note: Appearance(s) in League One play-offs)	1	21	2
Derby County (loan)	2023–24	League One	1	0	0	0	—		1	0	2	0
Blackpool	2024–25	League One	15	0	2	0	3	0	3	1	23	1
Carlisle United	2024–25	League Two	18	0	—		—		—		18	0
Career total			122	14	6	1	7	0	13	3	148	18

== Honours ==
Blackpool

- EFL League One play-offs: 2021

Sunderland

- EFL League One play-offs: 2022

Individual

- Sunderland Young Player of the Year: 2021–22
