= Nathan Broadhead =

Welsh footballer (born 1998)

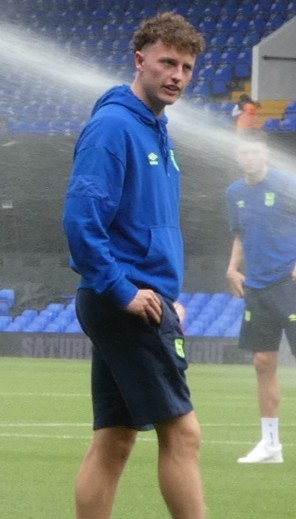
- Broadhead with Ipswich Town in 2023

Personal information
- Full name: Nathan Paul Broadhead
- Date of birth: 5 April 1998 (age 28)
- Place of birth: Bangor, Wales
- Height: 5 ft 10 in (1.78 m)
- Positions: Forward; left winger

Team information
- Current team: Wrexham
- Number: 33

Youth career
- Bangor City
- Wrexham
- 2008–2017: Everton

Senior career*
Years	Team	Apps	(Gls)
2017–2023	Everton	1	(0)
2019–2020	→ Burton Albion (loan)	19	(2)
2021–2022	→ Sunderland (loan)	20	(10)
2022–2023	→ Wigan Athletic (loan)	22	(5)
2023–2025	Ipswich Town	76	(23)
2025–	Wrexham	39	(7)

International career^{‡}
2014–2015	Wales U17	5	(0)
2015–2016	Wales U19	9	(6)
2017	Wales U20	3	(0)
2017–2020	Wales U21	17	(2)
2023–	Wales	20	(4)
- * Club domestic league appearances and goals as of 23 August 2026 (UTC) ‡ National team caps and goals as of 21:00, 6 June 2026 (UTC)

Nathan Paul Broadhead (born 5 April 1998) is a Welsh professional footballer who plays as a forward or left winger for EFL Championship club Wrexham and the Wales national team.

== Club career ==
=== Everton ===
Broadhead joined Everton at the age of 10 from Wrexham. On 6 December 2017, Broadhead was named in Everton's first team squad for the Europa League match away to Apollon Limassol. A day later, he made his first-team debut, coming on as an 82nd-minute substitute and flicking on for Nikola Vlašić's goal in a 3–0 win.

On 2 August 2019, Broadhead signed a one-year contract extension until 2021, then joined Burton Albion on loan for the 2019–20 season. A day later, he made his Football League debut, coming on as a substitute in Burton's 1–0 loss to Ipswich Town.

He made the bench for the first time in the 2020–21 season in a Premier League match against Southampton on 1 March where Everton went on to win 1–0. Broadhead subsequently made his Premier League debut away against Brighton & Hove Albion on 12 April.

In June 2021, he signed a new two-year deal with Everton. On 16 August 2021, Broadhead joined League One side Sunderland on loan until the end of the season.

On 9 August 2022, he joined Wigan Athletic on loan until the end of the 2022–23 season. This ended prematurely on 6 January 2023, when Everton recalled him.

=== Ipswich Town ===
On 9 January 2023, Broadhead joined Ipswich Town on a three-and-a-half-year deal for a reported fee of £1.5m. This ended his 15-year association with Everton.

Broadhead ended the 2023–24 season as Town's joint top scorer with 13 goals as he helped the club return to the Premier League for the first time since 2002. Broadhead scored his first-ever Premier League goal in a 2–1 win for Town at AFC Bournemouth on 2 April 2025.

=== Wrexham ===
On 14 August 2025, Broadhead joined Wrexham on a four-year deal. On 23 September, he scored his first goal for Wrexham in a 2–0 victory over Reading in the third round of the EFL Cup.

== International career ==
Broadhead represented Wales at various age levels, including playing for Wales under-20 at the 2017 Toulon Tournament.

On 19 May 2022, he was called up to the senior Wales squad for the 2022 FIFA World Cup qualifier play-off final against Ukraine or Scotland on 5 June 2022 and the Nations League Group A matches against Poland, Netherlands, Belgium and the Netherlands again on 1 June, 8 June, 11 June and 14 June 2022 respectively. However he later had to withdraw through injury.

On 25 March 2023, Broadhead earned his first senior Wales cap against Croatia in the Euro 2024 qualifying match, scoring a 93rd minute equaliser in the 1–1 draw.

== Career statistics ==
=== Club ===
As of match played 7 August 2026

Appearances and goals by club, season and competition
Club	Season	League			FA Cup		League Cup		Other		Total	
Club	Season	Division	Apps	Goals	Apps	Goals	Apps	Goals	Apps	Goals	Apps	Goals
Everton	2017–18	Premier League	0	0	0	0	0	0	1 (Note: Appearance in UEFA Europa League)	0	1	0
Everton	2018–19	Premier League	0	0	0	0	0	0	—		0	0
Everton	2020–21	Premier League	1	0	0	0	0	0	—		1	0
Everton	2021–22	Premier League	0	0	—		—		—		0	0
Everton	2022–23	Premier League	0	0	—		—		—		0	0
Total			1	0	0	0	0	0	1	0	2	0
Burton Albion (loan)	2019–20	League One	19	2	1	0	2	1	0	0	22	3
Sunderland (loan)	2021–22	League One	20	10	1	0	3	2	3 (Note: One appearance and one goal in EFL Trophy, two appearances in League One play-offs)	1	27	13
Wigan Athletic (loan)	2022–23	Championship	22	5	—		0	0	—		22	5
Ipswich Town	2022–23	League One	19	8	2	0	—		—		21	8
Ipswich Town	2023–24	Championship	38	13	2	0	1	0	—		41	13
Ipswich Town	2024–25	Premier League	18	2	3	0	0	0	—		21	2
Ipswich Town	2025–26	Championship	1	0	—		0	0	—		1	0
Ipswich Town	Total		76	23	7	0	1	0	0	0	84	23
Wrexham	2025–26	Championship	38	7	2	0	2	1	—		42	8
Wrexham	2026–27	Championship	0	0	0	0	1	0	0	0	1	0
Wrexham	Total		38	7	2	0	3	1	0	0	43	8
Career total			176	47	11	0	9	4	4	1	200	52

=== International ===
As of match played 6 June 2026

Appearances and goals by national team and year
National team	Year	Apps	Goals
Wales	2023	9	2
Wales	2024	4	0
Wales	2025	4	2
Wales	2026	3	0
Total		20	4

As of match played 18 November 2025

Wales score listed first, score column indicates score after each Broadhead goal.

International goals by date, venue, cap, opponent, score, result and competition
No.	Date	Venue	Cap	Opponent	Score	Result	Competition	Ref.
1	25 March 2023	Stadion Poljud, Split, Croatia	1	Croatia	1–1	1–1	UEFA Euro 2024 qualifying	
2	11 October 2023	Racecourse Ground, Wrexham, Wales	6	Gibraltar	3–0	4–0	Friendly	
3	13 October 2025	Cardiff City Stadium, Cardiff, Wales	15	Belgium	2–3	2–4	2026 FIFA World Cup qualification	
4	18 November 2025	Cardiff City Stadium, Cardiff, Wales	17	North Macedonia	7–1	7–1	2026 FIFA World Cup qualification	

== Honours ==
Everton U23s

- Premier League Cup: 2018–19

Sunderland

- EFL League One play-offs: 2022

Ipswich Town

- EFL League One runner-up: 2022–23
- EFL Championship runner-up: 2023–24

Individual

- EFL League One Goal of the Month: February 2023
