= Lynden Gooch =

American soccer player (born 1995)

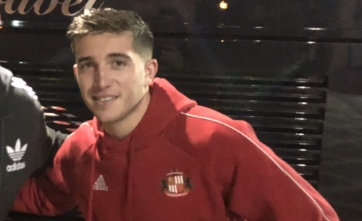
- Gooch in 2018

Personal information
- Full name: Lynden Jack Gooch
- Date of birth: December 24, 1995 (age 30)
- Place of birth: Santa Cruz, California, U.S.
- Height: 1.73 m (5 ft 8 in)
- Positions: Winger; wing-back

Team information
- Current team: Huddersfield Town
- Number: 7

Youth career
- 2008–2012: Santa Cruz County Breakers
- 2012–2015: Sunderland

Senior career*
| Years | Team | Apps | (Gls) |
| 2015–2023 | Sunderland | 212 | (23) |
| 2015 | → Gateshead (loan) | 7 | (1) |
| 2016 | → Doncaster Rovers (loan) | 10 | (0) |
| 2023–2025 | Stoke City | 49 | (2) |
| 2025– | Huddersfield Town | 32 | (2) |

International career
| 2013 | Republic of Ireland U18 | 1 | (0) |
| 2015 | United States U20 | 4 | (0) |
| 2016–2018 | United States | 4 | (0) |
- * Club domestic league appearances and goals as of 15 April 2026 (UTC)

Lynden Jack Gooch (born December 24, 1995) is an American professional soccer player who plays as a winger or wing-back for EFL League One side Huddersfield Town.

He began his professional career at Sunderland, playing in the Premier League, Championship and League One. He totalled 246 games and 25 goals for the club, winning the EFL Trophy in 2021. In 2023, he joined Stoke City for an undisclosed fee. Between 2016 and 2018, he played four games for the United States national team.

== Youth career ==
Gooch was born in Santa Cruz, California on December 24, 1995, son of an English father (born in Colchester) and an Irish mother (born in Dublin). His father is a professional soccer coach. At an early age, he joined the U.S. Soccer Development Academy club Santa Cruz County Breakers Academy. Gooch's talent attracted the attention of several European outfits, earning him a trial and eventual spot with Sunderland's youth academy. From the age of 10 Gooch traveled to Sunderland regularly during school holidays to train before moving to England and joining full-time at the age of 16, signing a two-year scholarship. Since joining the Sunderland U-16 side, Gooch worked his way through the U-18 and U-21 sides. In November 2014, he signed a contract with the club, lasting until 2017.

== Club career ==
=== Sunderland ===
On February 27, 2015, Gooch went on loan to Conference side Gateshead, on a 28-day youth loan. Gooch made his professional debut soon after, playing the whole game, in a 1–0 home loss against Bristol Rovers. Gooch made seven appearances and scored one goal, putting the Tynesiders ahead in a 3–1 home win against Wrexham and causing an own goal by opponent Steve Tomassen.

Gooch made his professional debut for Sunderland on August 26, 2015, in a League Cup second round match against Exeter City as a substitute for Adam Matthews in the 58th minute of a 6–3 win at the Stadium of Light. On January 21, 2016, Gooch was loaned for a month to Doncaster Rovers of League One. He made his debut for them two days later, playing the full 90 minutes of a goalless draw at Fleetwood Town and his performance was praised by the Sheffield Star. After a handful of appearances for the club, on February 24 his loan was extended till then end of the season. He returned to Sunderland on March 19, due to ankle injury that he sustained against Fleetwood Town, but continued to play through the pain for eight matches.

On April 21, 2016, Gooch signed a three-year contract with Sunderland, keeping him until 2019. On August 13, he made his Premier League debut, starting away against Manchester City in Sunderland's first match of the season, a 2–1 defeat. After making his debut, the Sunderland Echo commented on his performance, describing him as "Energy, fearlessness and endeavour". Gooch continued to appear in the first team despite being on the substitutes' bench on numerous occasions, before suffering an ankle injury in November that kept him out between two and three months. Though he was fit again by February 2017, he was frozen out of the team by manager David Moyes who preferred Adnan Januzaj and Fabio Borini in midfield, as the season ended with relegation. Gooch scored his first goal for the Black Cats on August 22, 2017, in a League Cup second round match away to Carlisle United, the winning goal in a 2–1 victory at Brunton Park. He said that he had dreamt of the moment since the age of 10. A month later he recorded a first league goal, a penalty that he won himself to equalise in a 2–1 home loss to Cardiff City.

Sunderland suffered a second consecutive relegation to the 2018–19 EFL League One. On August 4, in their first game of the season, Gooch headed an added-time winner in a 2–1 home victory over Charlton Athletic – the Black Cats' first opening win for eleven years. In what would have been the last season of his contract, he signed a three-year extension on December 31. Gooch scored the only goal against Tranmere Rovers in the 2021 EFL Trophy final on March 14, 2021. On May 21 the following year, he played the full 90 minutes at right-back as Sunderland won 2–0 against Wycombe Wanderers in the 2022 EFL League One play-off final, ending their four years in League One.

=== Stoke City ===
On September 1, 2023, Gooch joined fellow Championship club Stoke City for an undisclosed fee on a two-year contract. One of 18 new signings by manager Alex Neil, he made his debut the next day in a 2–0 home loss to Preston North End, as a substitute for the final half-hour. He scored his first goal on December 17 with what the Stoke Sentinel called a "bizarre opener" in a 1–1 draw at West Bromwich Albion, sending a cross into the goal. He scored his second goal of campaign on December 26, 2023, in a 3–1 victory against Birmingham City. His season was ended early after picking up a hamstring injury. He made 30 appearances for Stoke in 2023–24 as the team avoided relegation, finishing in 17th. Gooch had an injury-hit 2024–25 season, making 23 appearances as Stoke avoided relegation on the final day. He departed the club at the end the season following the expiration of his contract.

=== Huddersfield Town ===
In July 2025, Gooch signed a three-year contract with Huddersfield Town.

== International career ==
Gooch was eligible to play for England (due to his English father), the Republic of Ireland (due to Irish mother), or the United States (due to birthright citizenship).

After appearing once for the Republic of Ireland U18 side, Gooch switched allegiance to United States after being called up for United States U20, Gooch made his United States U20 debut on November 15, 2014, in a 1–0 win over Republic of Ireland U21. Gooch represented the United States under-20 team at the 2015 CONCACAF Championship in Jamaica, playing four games as they achieved qualification for the year's World Cup in that category.

On October 2, 2016, Gooch was called up to the senior team for a pair of friendlies against Cuba and New Zealand. Nine days later, he made his debut against New Zealand, replacing Kellyn Acosta for the final 31 minutes of a 1–1 draw at the RFK Stadium in Washington, D.C.

== Personal life ==
Gooch's brother, Anthony, played college soccer for the San Diego State Aztecs men's soccer team. Gooch has another brother, Darshan, who is a professional surfer.

== Career statistics ==
=== Club ===
As of match played 19 August 2025

Appearances and goals by club, season and competition
| Club | Season | League | | | FA Cup | | EFL Cup | | Other | | Total | |
| Club | Season | Division | Apps | Goals | Apps | Goals | Apps | Goals | Apps | Goals | Apps | Goals |
|---|---|---|---|---|---|---|---|---|---|---|---|---|
| Sunderland | 2014–15 | Premier League | 0 | 0 | 0 | 0 | 0 | 0 | — | | 0 | 0 |
| Sunderland | 2015–16 | Premier League | 0 | 0 | 0 | 0 | 1 | 0 | — | | 1 | 0 |
| Sunderland | 2016–17 | Premier League | 11 | 0 | 0 | 0 | 3 | 0 | — | | 14 | 0 |
| Sunderland | 2017–18 | Championship | 24 | 1 | 0 | 0 | 3 | 1 | — | | 27 | 2 |
| Sunderland | 2018–19 | League One | 39 | 5 | 2 | 1 | 1 | 0 | 5 (Note: Three appearances and one goal in EFL Trophy; two appearances in League One play-offs) | 1 | 47 | 7 |
| Sunderland | 2019–20 | League One | 30 | 10 | 0 | 0 | 2 | 0 | 1 (Note: Appearance(s) in EFL Trophy) | 0 | 33 | 10 |
| Sunderland | 2020–21 | League One | 38 | 4 | 0 | 0 | 1 | 0 | 7 (Note: Five appearances and one goal in EFL Trophy; two appearances in League One play-offs) | 1 | 46 | 5 |
| Sunderland | 2021–22 | League One | 38 | 0 | 1 | 0 | 2 | 0 | 4 (Note: One appearance in EFL Trophy; three appearances in League One play-offs) | 0 | 45 | 0 |
| Sunderland | 2022–23 | Championship | 30 | 1 | 0 | 0 | 0 | 0 | 1 (Note: Appearances in Championship play-offs) | 0 | 31 | 1 |
| Sunderland | 2023–24 | Championship | 2 | 0 | 0 | 0 | 0 | 0 | — | | 2 | 0 |
| Sunderland | Total | | 212 | 21 | 3 | 1 | 13 | 1 | 18 | 2 | 246 | 25 |
| Gateshead (loan) | 2014–15 | Conference Premier | 7 | 1 | 0 | 0 | — | | — | | 7 | 1 |
| Doncaster Rovers (loan) | 2015–16 | League One | 10 | 0 | 0 | 0 | 0 | 0 | 0 | 0 | 10 | 0 |
| Sunderland U21 | 2017–18 | — | | | — | | — | | 1 | 0 | 1 | 0 |
| Stoke City | 2023–24 | Championship | 29 | 2 | 0 | 0 | 1 | 0 | — | | 30 | 2 |
| Stoke City | 2024–25 | Championship | 20 | 0 | 1 | 0 | 2 | 0 | — | | 23 | 0 |
| Stoke City | Total | | 49 | 2 | 1 | 0 | 3 | 0 | — | | 53 | 2 |
| Huddersfield Town | 2025–26 | League One | 4 | 1 | 0 | 0 | 1 | 0 | 0 | 0 | 5 | 1 |
| Career total | | | 282 | 25 | 4 | 1 | 17 | 1 | 19 | 2 | 322 | 29 |

=== International ===
Appearances and goals by national team and year
| National team | Year | Apps | Goals |
|---|---|---|---|
| United States | 2016 | 2 | 0 |
| United States | 2017 | 1 | 0 |
| United States | 2018 | 1 | 0 |
| Total | | 4 | 0 |

== Honors ==
Sunderland

- EFL Trophy: 2020–21; runner-up: 2018–19
- EFL League One play-offs: 2022
