= Patrick Almond =

English footballer

Personal information
- Date of birth: 13 December 2002 (age 23)
- Place of birth: Northumberland, England
- Position: Defender

Team information
- Current team: Ashington
- Number: 5

Youth career
- 2012–2014: Wallsend Boys Club
- 2014–2021: Sunderland

Senior career*
Years	Team	Apps	(Gls)
2021–2022	Sunderland	0	(0)
2022	→ Blyth Spartans (loan)	21	(1)
2022–2023	Shildon	2	(0)
2022–2023	Darlington	2	(0)
2023–2024	Whitley Bay	23	(2)
2024	Ashington	21	(2)
2025	Blyth Spartans	20	(0)
2025-2026	Bishop Auckland	42	(1)
2026-	Ashington	0	(0)
- * Club domestic league appearances and goals as of 17:15, 06 July 2026 (UTC)

Patrick Joseph Almond (born 13 December 2002) is an English footballer who plays as a central defender for Ashington AFC.

== Career ==
=== Sunderland ===
Almond is a product of Sunderland's Academy system having been there since the age of 11 and was a regular starter in the Under-23 team during the 2020–21 season. He signed his first Professional Contract in the summer of 2021, which was incorrectly reported as an extension to a previous Contract.

He was an unused first-team substitute for two EFL Trophy games against Fleetwood Town and Lincoln City in the 2020–21 season after impressing for the Under-23s. He gained his senior professional debut in the same competition on 13 October 2021, in a 2–1 win over Manchester United U-23s after also being an unused substitute against Lincoln City the week before, again in the EFL Trophy.

==== Blyth Spartans (loan) ====
On 14 January 2022, Almond joined National League North side Blyth Spartans on loan for the remainder of the 2021–22 season. He made his League debut for Blyth Spartans during the win against Alfreton Town on 22 January 2022. Almond went on to score his first senior goal against Southport FC in a League fixture on 22 February 2022.

Almond went on to be an every present in the Blyth Spartans team for the remainder of the 2021–22 season, making 24 senior appearances in total, including the Northumberland Senior Cup win against Newcastle United U23s at St James' Park on 5 May 2022. Almond returned to Sunderland AFC at the end of his loan spell but was released at the end of the 2021–22 season in June 2022.

=== Return to football ===
After being involved in a car accident in June 2022, Almond returned to football in November 2022 playing for Shildon in the Northern Premier League Division One East, making his debut against Grimsby Borough.

On 13 December 2022, Almond was signed on dual registration by Darlington as defensive cover during the remainder of the 2022–23 season. He went on to make his debut as a substitute in the FA Trophy win against Spennymoor Town on 20 December. During an FA Trophy match at Southend United on 14 January 2023, Almond suffered a suspected concussion and was taken to hospital locally, where he was diagnosed with a bleed on the brain and transferred to a London hospital for specialist treatment.

After spending nearly 3 weeks in hospital Almond was discharged to start his recovery at home, with his football career in the balance, but remained hopeful and positive that a return was possible.

Almond signed for Whitley Bay in November 2023 and made his debut against Northallerton Town in a Northern Football League Division One fixture on 11 November 2023. His recovery continued to progress well, with Whitley Bay Manager at the time Nick Gray, giving some positive feedback.

At the end of the season, Almond moved on to Ashington for the start of the 2024-25 season and made 28 appearances, but he was given the opportunity to re-join previous loan club Blyth Spartans at the start of 2025 and made his first appearance in the New Years game with Morpeth Town, in the Northern Premier League.

=== Moving Forward ===
Almond signed for Bishop Auckland at the start of the 2025-26 season, making his debut against Whickham in the extra preliminary round of the FA Cup. Bishop unfortunately suffered relegation on the last day of the season, but Almond did start in every match of the campaign making an impressive 49 appearances.

At the start of the 2026-27 season, Almond opted for a return to former club Ashington AFC, where he rejoined some familiar faces under the new Manager Marc Ellison.

== Career statistics ==
As of match played 27 April 2026

Appearances and goals by club, season and competition
Club	Season	League			FA Cup		League Cup		Other		Total	
Club	Season	Division	Apps	Goals	Apps	Goals	Apps	Goals	Apps	Goals	Apps	Goals
Sunderland	2021–22	League One	0	0	0	0	0	0	1 (Note: Appearance in EFL Trophy)	0	1	0
Blyth Spartans (loan)	2021–22	National League North	21	1	0	0	0	0	3 (Note: Appearances in Northumberland Senior Cup)	0	24	1
Shildon	2022–23	Northern Premier League Division One East	2	0	0	0	0	0	0	0	2	0
Darlington	2022–23	National League North	2	0	0	0	0	0	2 (Note: Appearance in FA Trophy)	0	4	0
Whitley Bay	2023–24	Northern Football League Division One	23	2	0	0	0	0	0	0	23	2
Ashington AFC	2024–25	Northern Premier League East Division	21	2	4	0	0	0	3	0	28	2
Blyth Spartans	2024-25	Northern Premier League Premier Division	20	0	0	0	0	0	0	0	20	0
Bishop Auckland	2025-26	Northern Premier League East Division	42	1	4	0	0	0	3	0	49	1
Career total			131	6	8	0	0	0	12	0	151	6
