= Patrick Roberts =

English footballer (born 1997)

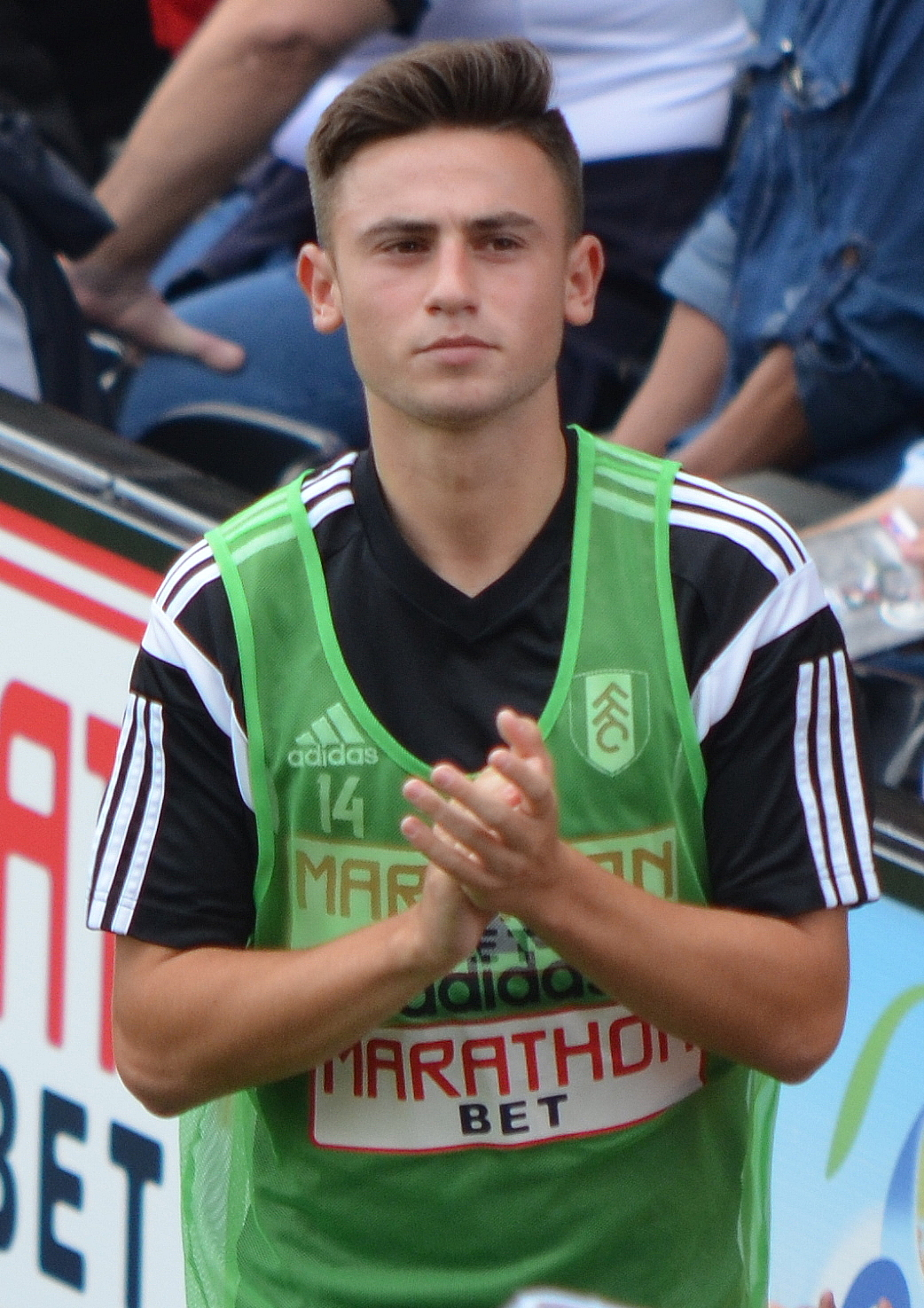
- Roberts in 2014

Personal information
- Full name: Patrick John Joseph Roberts
- Date of birth: 5 February 1997 (age 29)
- Place of birth: Kingston upon Thames, England
- Height: 5 ft 6 in (1.67 m)
- Position: Winger

Team information
- Current team: Birmingham City
- Number: 16

Youth career
- –2010: Molesey Juniors
- –2010: AFC Wimbledon
- 2010–2014: Fulham

Senior career*
Years	Team	Apps	(Gls)
2014–2015	Fulham	19	(0)
2015–2022	Manchester City	1	(0)
2016–2018	→ Celtic (loan)	55	(15)
2018–2019	→ Girona (loan)	19	(0)
2019–2020	→ Norwich City (loan)	3	(0)
2020–2021	→ Middlesbrough (loan)	19	(1)
2021	→ Derby County (loan)	15	(1)
2021–2022	→ Troyes (loan)	1	(0)
2021	→ Troyes II (loan)	1	(0)
2022–2026	Sunderland	134	(8)
2025–2026	→ Birmingham City (loan)	25	(3)
2026–	Birmingham City	10	(1)

International career^{‡}
2012–2013	England U16	7	(1)
2013–2014	England U17	14	(7)
2015	England U18	2	(1)
2014–2016	England U19	16	(6)
2016–2017	England U20	8	(4)
- * Club domestic league appearances and goals as of 19:23, 15 February 2026 (UTC) ‡ National team caps and goals as of 21:53, 24 April 2017 (UTC)

Patrick John Joseph Roberts (born 5 February 1997) is an English professional footballer who plays as a winger for EFL Championship club Birmingham City.

== Club career ==
=== Fulham ===
Roberts began playing grassroots football with Molesey Juniors and then with AFC Wimbledon. He was offered trials with many professional football club academies but it was Fulham who signed Roberts at the age of 13. He signed his first professional contract shortly after his 17th birthday in February 2014, tying himself to the club until the summer of 2016. Roberts described signing the contract as "one of the best feelings I've ever had in my life".

Roberts was named among Fulham's substitutes for the first time on 15 March 2014 for a Premier League game against Newcastle United, with Fulham manager Felix Magath describing Roberts after the match as "an extraordinary talent". On 22 March 2014, he made his debut as a 55th-minute substitute in a Premier League defeat to Manchester City. On 5 May, he scored in the second leg of the 2014 FA Youth Cup final, which Fulham lost 7–6 on aggregate to Chelsea. Roberts' first appearance of the 2014–2015 campaign came as a substitute in Fulham's opening day fixture at Ipswich Town on 9 August, where he managed to grab an assist shortly after coming on. He made his first start for the Cottagers on 20 August 2014 in a home match against Wolverhampton Wanderers.

=== Manchester City ===
On 19 July 2015, Roberts signed for Manchester City on a long-term deal for an undisclosed fee, believed to be in the region of £12 million. Roberts made his debut coming on as a substitute for Jesús Navas against Real Madrid in the pre-season 2015 International Champions Cup. On 22 September 2015, Roberts made his first team debut for Manchester City when he came on as a substitute during a 4–1 win against Sunderland in the League Cup. He made his league debut for Manchester City in a 4–1 loss to Tottenham Hotspur, coming on as a substitute for Sergio Agüero.

==== Loans to Celtic ====
On 29 January 2016, it was reported that Celtic had agreed an 18-month loan deal with Manchester City for Roberts, while the player was in Glasgow for a medical. The transfer was confirmed on 1 February. He played for the U20 side a couple of days later in a 4–0 win over Motherwell, scoring Celtic's fourth in the last minute and providing assists for the other three goals. Roberts made his first team debut for Celtic on 20 February 2016, coming on a substitute for the final few minutes of Celtic's 3–0 league win over Inverness Caledonian Thistle at Celtic Park. He was given his first starting appearance on 2 March in a league match at home against Dundee. Celtic could only draw 0–0, but Roberts was noted to have looked "sharp" and showed "flashes of his talent".

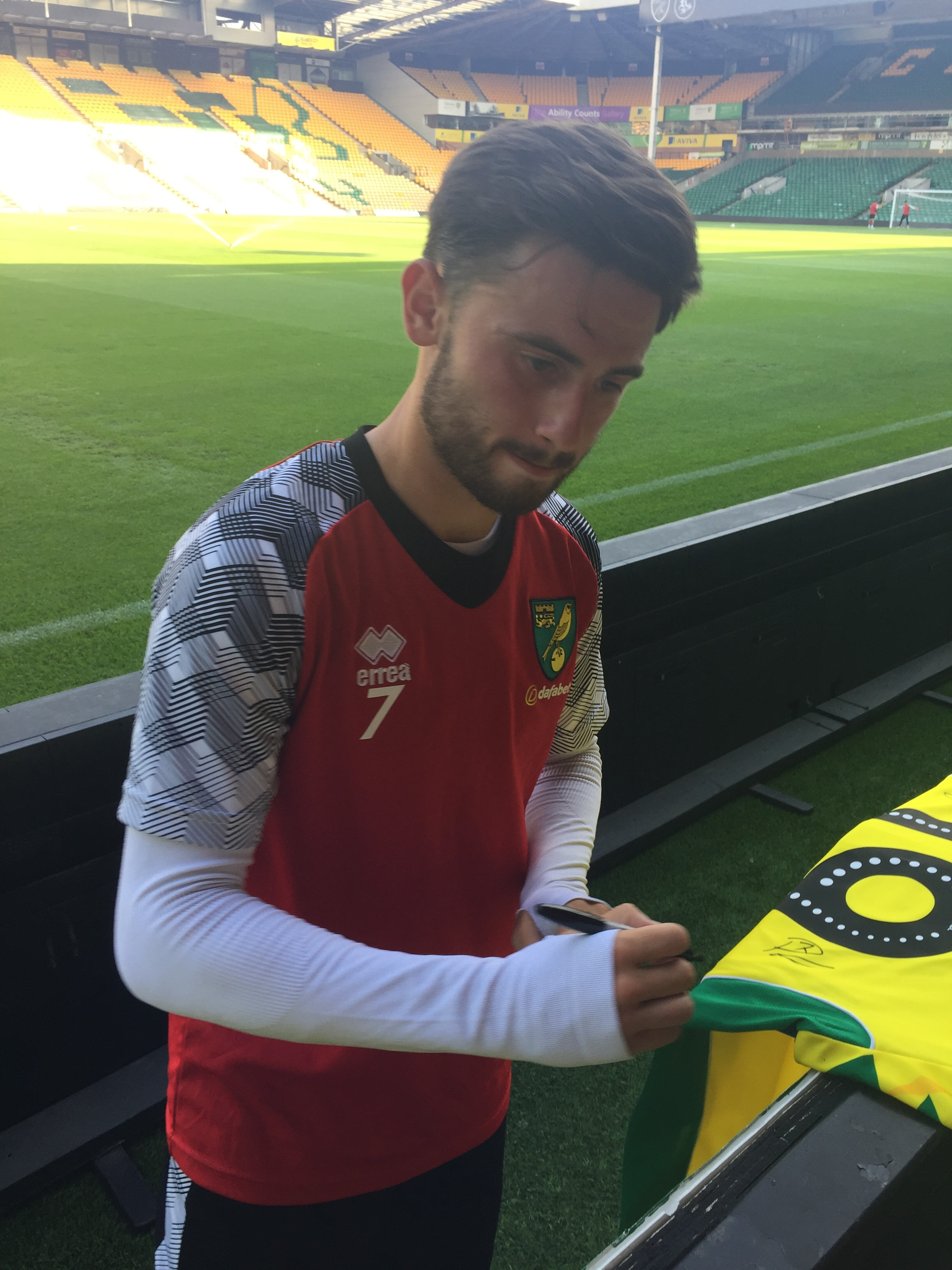
Roberts after a training session with Norwich City in 2019

On 2 April 2016, Roberts scored his first competitive club goal, netting a brace for Celtic in a 3–1 come-from-behind win over Hearts. Following an impressive run of form during which he netted three goals, Roberts was named Scottish Player of the Month for April. He scored another brace on 8 May in a 3–2 win over Aberdeen, in the process helping Celtic clinch the Scottish Premiership title. Roberts scored another goal on the final day of the season in a 7–0 drubbing of Motherwell, thereby ending the campaign with 7 goals in 12 appearances for Celtic.

Roberts made his first ever Champions League appearance on 20 July 2016, starting and scoring in a 3–0 win over Lincoln Red Imps. He had previously rejected the opportunity to represent England at the U19 European Championship in order to help Celtic progress to the Champions League proper. On 6 December 2016, Roberts scored an impressive solo goal and was named man of the match in a Champions League match against his parent club Manchester City. He finished the 2016–17 season with 43 appearances and 15 goals, helping Celtic to complete an unbeaten domestic season, in which the club secured its sixth consecutive league title.

On 28 August 2017, it was announced that Roberts had rejoined Celtic on a new season-long loan. In November, during a match against Motherwell, Roberts suffered a hamstring injury and was sidelined for a number of months. He made his return against the same opposition on 18 March 2018 when he came on a substitute for James Forrest in a 0–0 draw.

==== Loan to Girona ====
Roberts joined Manchester City's Spanish partner club Girona for the 2018–19 season, with Manchester City saying that the ideal next stage in Robert's development would be testing himself in La Liga, one of the world's most technical leagues. At the time of signing he was the only English player playing in the Spanish top flight and he made his debut the following day as a substitute against Real Valladolid. He endured a difficult campaign, however, and failed to score in 19 league appearances as the club suffered relegation to the Segunda División.

==== Loan to Norwich City ====
Roberts was the first new addition to most-recent Championship winners and therefore newly promoted Premier League club Norwich City, signing for them on a season-long loan.

==== Loans to Middlesbrough ====
On 2 January 2020, Roberts joined Middlesbrough on loan until the end of the 2019–20 season. He scored his first goal for Middlesbrough in a 2–1 win over Reading on 14 July 2020. On 12 October 2020, it was announced that he would be loaned to the club again for the duration of the 2020–21 campaign.

==== Loan to Derby County ====
On 1 February 2021, Roberts joined Derby County on loan for the remainder of the 2020–21 season. Two days later, he made his debut for the Rams as a substitute for Kamil Jóźwiak in a 0–3 away league defeat by Rotherham United.

==== Loan to Troyes ====
On 31 August 2021 he moved on loan to French club Troyes.

=== Sunderland ===
On 21 January 2022, Roberts joined League One side Sunderland on an initial short-term six-month deal with the club having the option to extend his contract. He scored his first goal for Sunderland in a 2–0 win over Crewe Alexandra on 12 March 2022. On 9 May 2022 he scored the winning goal for Sunderland in the 2nd leg of the League 1 play off semi-final against Sheffield Wednesday, to send them to the play-off final at Wembley Stadium. On 25 June 2022, Roberts signed a new two-year contract with the club after achieving promotion through the play-offs.

=== Birmingham City ===
On 1 September 2025, Roberts joined EFL Championship side Birmingham City on a season long loan.

On 2 February 2026, having impressed across the first half of the season, Roberts signed for Birmingham City on a permanent basis for an undisclosed fee, signing a two-and-a-half year deal.

== International career ==
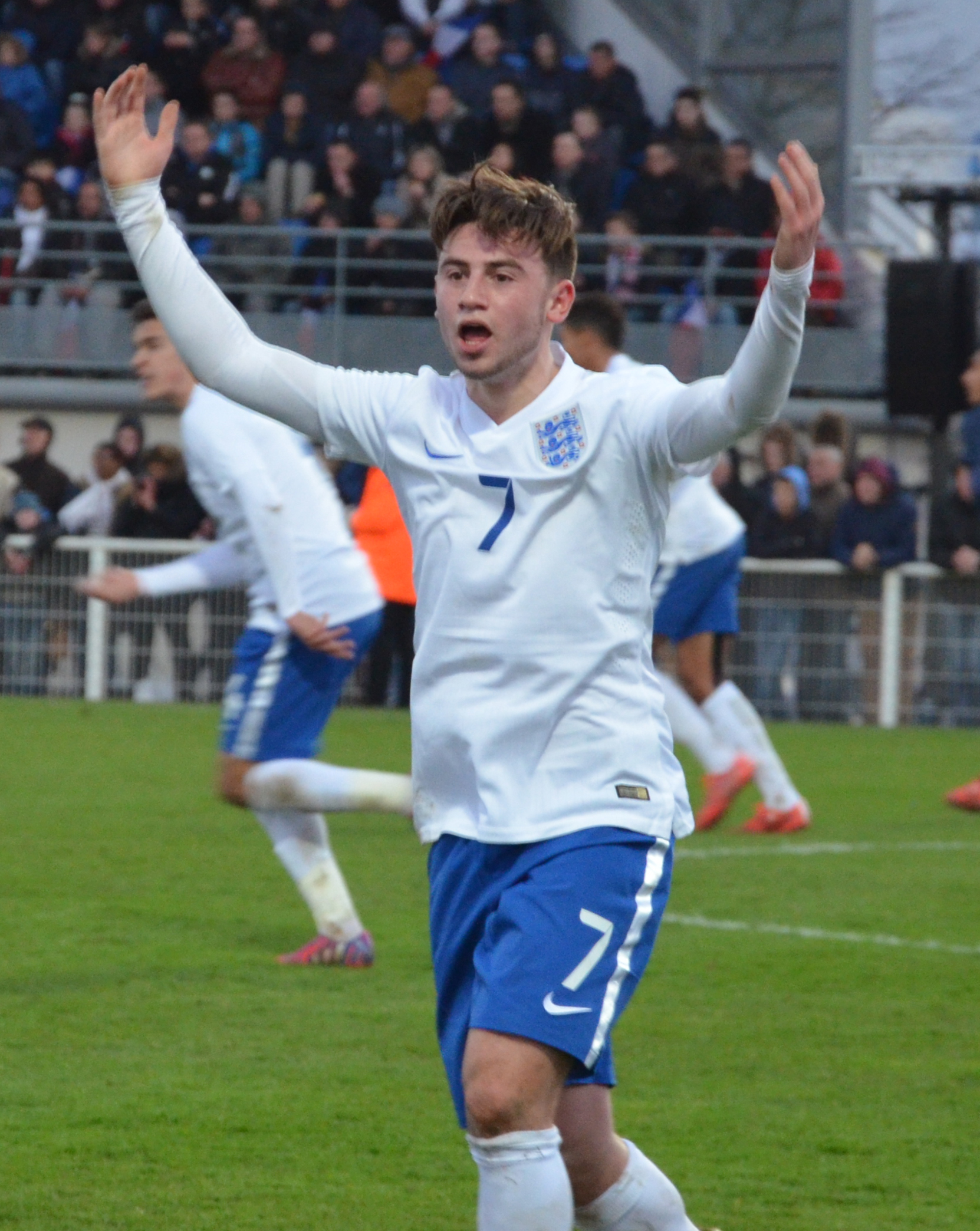
Roberts playing for England U19s in 2015

Roberts has represented England at under-16, under-17 and under-19 levels. He played an integral role in England's victory at the 2014 European Under-17 Championship in Malta, scoring three goals, grabbing four assists and being named in the team of the tournament.

In August 2014 Roberts received his first call up to the England under-19 squad. Despite being just 17 years old at the time, Roberts played a big part in the England under-19 team's progression through the 2015 UEFA European Under-19 Championship qualifying round. In the three group games played by England under-19, Roberts recorded a total of four goals and four assists. He had previously rejected the chance to be in the England squad at the U19 European Championship in order to help Celtic progress to the Champions League proper. Roberts was also expected to be selected for the England under-20 squad in the 2017 FIFA U-20 World Cup, but he instead opted to play for Celtic in the 2017 Scottish Cup Final.

== Personal life ==
Roberts was born in Kingston upon Thames, Greater London. His parents (Louise and Neil) are both from Merseyside. He has an older brother Adam and a younger sister Jessica. He is a fan of Liverpool F.C. He is an alumnus of Wimbledon College.

== Career statistics ==
As of match played 15 February 2026

Appearances and goals by club, season and competition
Club	Season	League			National cup (Note: Includes FA Cup, Scottish Cup, Copa del Rey, Coupe de France)		League cup (Note: Includes Football League/EFL Cup, Scottish League Cup)		Europe		Other		Total	
Club	Season	Division	Apps	Goals	Apps	Goals	Apps	Goals	Apps	Goals	Apps	Goals	Apps	Goals
Fulham	2013–14	Premier League	2	0	0	0	0	0	—		—		2	0
Fulham	2014–15	Championship	17	0	2	0	1	0	—		—		20	0
Fulham	Total		19	0	2	0	1	0	—		—		22	0
Manchester City	2015–16	Premier League	1	0	0	0	2	0	0	0	—		3	0
Celtic (loan)	2015–16	Scottish Premiership	11	6	2	0	—		—		—		13	6
Celtic (loan)	2016–17	Scottish Premiership	32	9	4	0	2	0	9 (Note: Appearances in UEFA Champions League)	2	—		47	11
Celtic (loan)	2017–18	Scottish Premiership	12	0	1	0	3	0	3	1	—		19	1
Celtic (loan)	Total		55	15	7	0	5	0	12	3	—		79	18
Girona (loan)	2018–19	La Liga	19	0	2	0	—		—		—		21	0
Norwich City (loan)	2019–20	Premier League	3	0	—		1	0	—		—		4	0
Middlesbrough (loan)	2019–20	Championship	10	1	1	0	—		—		—		11	1
Middlesbrough (loan)	2020–21	Championship	9	0	1	0	—		—		—		10	0
Middlesbrough (loan)	Total		19	1	2	0	0	0	—		—		21	1
Derby County (loan)	2020–21	Championship	15	1	—		—		—		—		15	1
Troyes (loan)	2021–22	Ligue 1	1	0	1	0	—		—		—		2	0
Troyes II (loan)	2021–22	Championnat National 3	1	0	—		—		—		—		1	0
Sunderland	2021–22	League One	14	1	—		—		—		3 (Note: Appearances in League One play-offs)	1	17	2
Sunderland	2022–23	Championship	42	5	3	0	1	0	—		2 (Note: Appearances in EFL Championship play-offs)	0	48	5
Sunderland	2023–24	Championship	32	0	0	0	0	0	—		—		32	0
Sunderland	2024–25	Championship	45	2	0	0	0	0	—		3	0	48	2
Sunderland	2025–26	Premier League	1	0	—		1	0	—		—		2	0
Sunderland	Total		134	8	3	0	2	0	—		8	1	147	9
Birmingham City (loan)	2025–26	Championship	25	3	1	0	—		—		—		26	3
Birmingham City	2025–26	Championship	2	0	1	1	—		—		—		3	1
Career total			294	28	19	1	11	0	12	3	8	1	344	33

== Honours ==
Celtic

- Scottish Premiership: 2015–16, 2016–17, 2017–18
- Scottish Cup: 2016–17, 2017–18
- Scottish League Cup: 2016–17, 2017–18

Girona

- Supercopa de Catalunya: 2018–19

Sunderland

- EFL League One play-offs: 2022
- EFL Championship play-offs: 2025

England U16

- Victory Shield: 2012

England U17

- UEFA European Under-17 Championship: 2014

Individual

- UEFA European Under-17 Championship Team of the Tournament: 2014
- Scottish Premiership Player of the Month: April 2016
