= Ross Stewart (footballer, born 1996) =

Scottish footballer (born 1996)

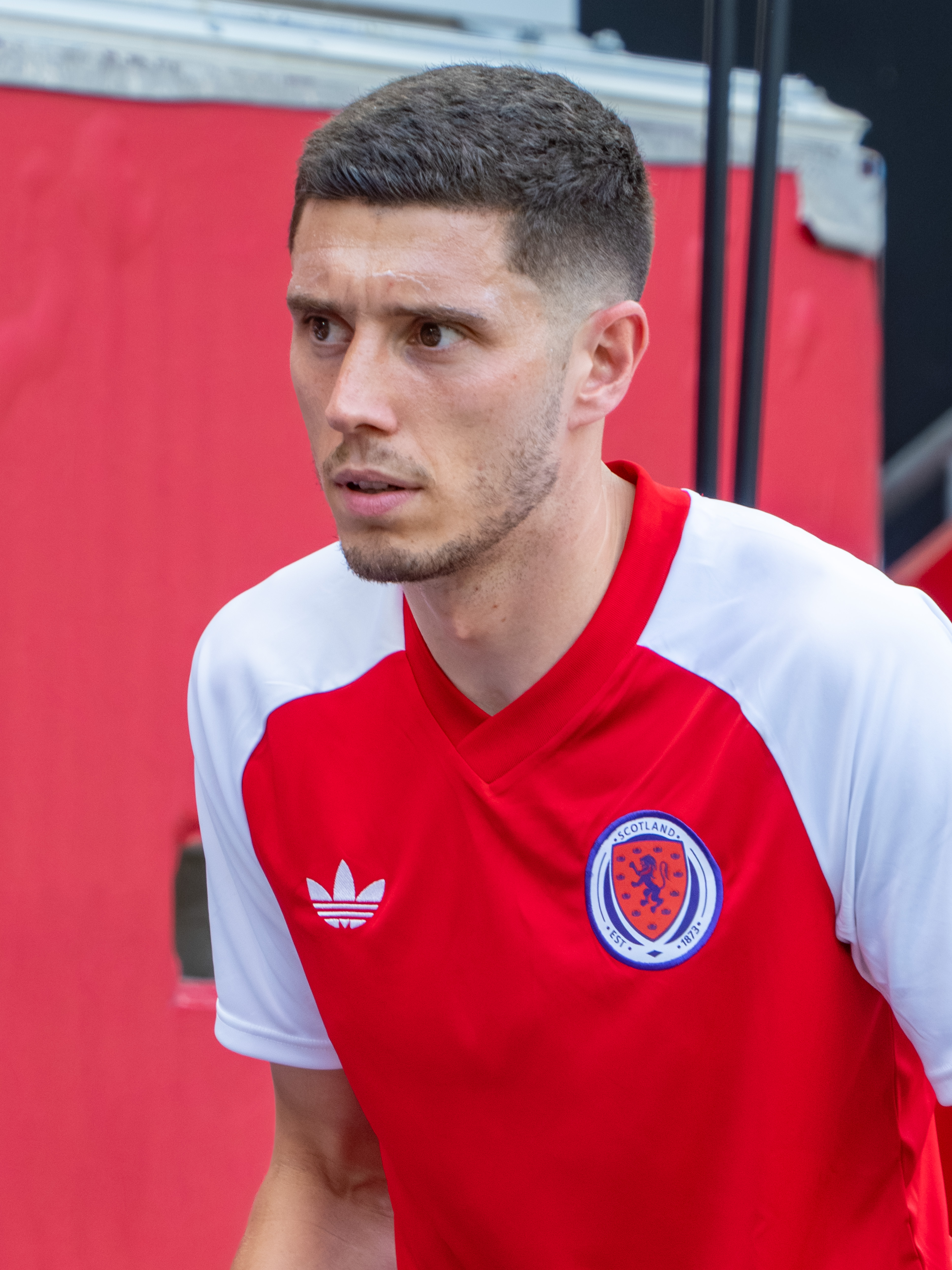
- Stewart with Scotland in 2026

Personal information
- Full name: Ross Cameron Stewart
- Date of birth: 11 July 1996 (age 30)
- Place of birth: Irvine, Ayrshire, Scotland
- Height: 6 ft 2 in (1.88 m)
- Position: Forward

Team information
- Current team: Swansea City
- Number: 31

Youth career
- St Mirren
- Celtic
- Partick Thistle

Senior career*
Years	Team	Apps	(Gls)
2013–2015	Ardeer Thistle	?	(?)
2015–2016	Kilwinning Rangers	?	(11)
2016–2017	Albion Rovers	25	(12)
2017–2018	St Mirren	10	(0)
2017–2018	→ Alloa Athletic (loan)	19	(7)
2018–2021	Ross County	63	(15)
2021–2023	Sunderland	70	(36)
2023–2026	Southampton	40	(9)
2026–	Swansea City	5	(1)

International career^{‡}
2022–	Scotland	4	(0)
- * Club domestic league appearances and goals as of 06:02, 10 November 2026 (UTC) ‡ National team caps and goals as of 20 June 2026

Ross Cameron Stewart (born 11 July 1996) is a Scottish professional footballer who plays as a forward for EFL Championship club Swansea City and the Scotland national team.

He began his career with Ardeer Thistle and Kilwinning Rangers before joining Albion Rovers in 2016. After one season, Stewart moved to St Mirren and went on loan to Alloa Athletic. In 2018, he joined Ross County, spending three seasons with the club before joining Sunderland in 2021 and helping them win promotion to the Championship. Stewart then signed for Southampton in 2023. He joined Swansea City in 2026.

Stewart made his international debut for Scotland in 2022. He was selected for the 2026 World Cup.

== Club career ==
=== Junior League ===
After spells with the youth systems of professional clubs, Stewart started his career in the Scottish Juniors with Ardeer Thistle and Kilwinning Rangers, before making the step-up to senior football with Albion Rovers in July 2016. The part-time Coatbridge club were unable to pay the £1,500 transfer fee, with the funds instead provided by their supporters' club members and by Stewart's father.

=== St Mirren ===
After just one season with Albion Rovers, Stewart signed for Scottish Championship club St Mirren on a two-year full-time contract (a goalkeeper with the same name also joined at the time). Stewart scored on his debut for the Paisley club in a Scottish League Cup win versus Stranraer but failed to break into the first-team and was loaned out to Scottish League One club Alloa Athletic in December 2017, for the remainder of the season.

=== Ross County ===
On 10 August 2018, Stewart signed for Ross County. He made his debut for the club in a 2–1 victory in the Scottish Challenge Cup against Heart of Midlothian Colts. Stewart scored his first goal for the club in the next round of the cup in a win against Montrose. He finished his first season at Ross County with 11 goals, three of them coming against County's Rivals Inverness Caledonian Thistle as Ross County were promoted to the Scottish Premiership.

=== Sunderland ===
On 31 January 2021, Stewart joined English side Sunderland for an undisclosed fee. Stewart scored on his Sunderland debut after coming on as a substitute against Accrington Stanley in a 2–0 away win on 17 March 2021. He was later given the nickname 'Loch Ness Drogba' by Sunderland supporters in reference to his Scottish heritage and comparisons with prolific former Chelsea striker Didier Drogba.

On 21 May 2022, Stewart scored the second goal in the 2022 EFL League One play-off final as Sunderland defeated Wycombe Wanderers 2–0 to gain promotion back to the EFL Championship. He finished the season as the league's joint top goalscorer with 26 goals and was later voted the PFA Fans' Player of the Year for League One.

During a 1–1 draw with Fulham on 28 January 2023 in the FA Cup fourth round, he was forced off in the first half after suffering an achilles injury. A week later, it was confirmed that Stewart would miss the remainder of the 2022–23 season.

=== Southampton ===
On 1 September 2023, Stewart joined Southampton on a three-year contract for an undisclosed fee. He made his debut for the club on 11 November 2023 in a 2–1 victory against West Bromwich Albion, replacing Adam Armstrong in the 83rd minute. During Southampton's 1–1 draw with Huddersfield Town on 25 November 2023, Stewart picked up an injury, with manager Russell Martin later confirming he was expected to be sidelined until late January. On 22 December 2023, it was confirmed that the injury to his hamstring would rule Stewart out for the rest of the season. Stewart returned from injury in a 2–1 away victory against Leeds United on the final day of the 2023–24 season, replacing Adam Armstrong in the 83rd minute.

On 14 September 2024, Stewart made his first Premier League appearance in a 3–0 home defeat against Manchester United after he replaced Cameron Archer in the 62nd minute. During his first start for the club since his permanent transfer, on 5 October 2024, Stewart suffered a muscle injury in a 3–1 defeat against Arsenal. On 25 May 2025, he scored his first goal for the club in a 2–1 home defeat against Arsenal.

Following the conclusion of the 2025–26 season, Stewart was released by Southampton.

=== Swansea City ===
On 6 August 2026, Stewart joined Swansea City on a three-year contract.

== International career ==
Stewart received his first call-up to the senior Scotland squad in March 2022 whilst playing for Sunderland. He made his international debut on 8 June 2022, appearing as a substitute in a Nations League game against Armenia.

Stewart was not selected by Scotland for four years, mainly due to injuries, but he was recalled to the squad by Steve Clarke for the 2026 World Cup finals.

== Career statistics ==
=== Club ===
As of match played 7 November 2026

Appearances and goals by club, season and competition
Club	Season	League			National cup (Note: Includes Scottish Cup, FA Cup)		League cup (Note: Includes Scottish League Cup, EFL Cup)		Other		Total	
Club	Season	Division	Apps	Goals	Apps	Goals	Apps	Goals	Apps	Goals	Apps	Goals
Albion Rovers	2016–17	Scottish League One	25	12	2	0	5	0	1 (Note: Appearance(s) in Scottish Challenge Cup)	0	33	12
St Mirren	2017–18	Scottish Championship	9	0	1	0	4	1	3	1	17	2
St Mirren	2018–19	Scottish Premiership	1	0	0	0	3	1	—		4	1
St Mirren	Total		10	0	1	0	7	2	3	1	21	3
Alloa Athletic (loan)	2017–18	Scottish League One	19	7	0	0	0	0	4 (Note: Appearances in Scottish Championship play-offs)	3	23	10
Ross County	2018–19	Scottish Championship	23	6	3	2	0	0	6	3	32	11
Ross County	2019–20	Scottish Premiership	21	7	0	0	5	4	—		26	11
Ross County	2020–21	Scottish Premiership	19	2	0	0	5	4	—		24	6
Ross County	Total		63	15	3	2	10	8	6	3	82	28
Sunderland	2020–21	League One	11	2	0	0	0	0	2 (Note: Appearances in League One play-offs)	1	13	3
Sunderland	2021–22	League One	46	24	0	0	4	0	3	2	53	26
Sunderland	2022–23	Championship	13	10	2	1	0	0	—		15	11
Sunderland	2023–24	Championship	0	0	0	0	0	0	—		0	0
Sunderland	Total		70	36	2	1	4	0	5	3	81	40
Southampton	2023–24	Championship	3	0	0	0	—		1 (Note: Appearance(s) in Championship play-offs)	0	4	0
Southampton	2024–25	Premier League	12	1	0	0	1	0	—		13	1
Southampton	2025–26	Championship	25	8	4	2	2	0	2	1	33	11
Southampton	Total		40	9	4	2	3	0	3	1	50	12
Swansea City	2026–27	Championship	5	1	0	0	0	0	—		5	1
Career total			225	77	12	5	29	10	22	11	295	106

=== International ===
As of match played 19 June 2026

Appearances and goals by national team and year
National team	Year	Apps	Goals
Scotland	2022	2	0
Scotland	2026	2	0
Total		4	0

== Honours ==
Ross County

- Scottish Championship: 2018–19
- Scottish Challenge Cup: 2018–19

Sunderland

- EFL Trophy: 2020–21
- EFL League One play-offs: 2022

Southampton

- EFL Championship play-offs: 2024

Individual

- PFA Fans' Player of the Year: 2021–22 League One
- PFA Team of the Year: 2021–22 EFL League One
- EFL League One Team of the Season: 2021–22
- Sunderland Player of the Year: 2021–22
