= Tyrese Dyce =

English association football player

Personal information
- Full name: Tyrese Devonte Dyce
- Date of birth: 19 April 2001 (age 25)
- Place of birth: Jamaica
- Height: 1.71 m (5 ft 7 in)
- Position: Defender

Team information
- Current team: Aldershot Town
- Number: 17

Youth career
- 2016–2021: West Bromwich Albion
- 2021: Sunderland

Senior career*
Years	Team	Apps	(Gls)
2021–2022	Sunderland	0	(0)
2022	→ Spennymoor Town (loan)	1	(0)
2023	Gosport Borough	5	(0)
2023–2024	Slough Town	22	(3)
2024–2025	Maidenhead United	11	(0)
2025–2026	Slough Town	31	(3)
2026–	Aldershot Town	0	(0)
- * Club domestic league appearances and goals as of 09:15, 29 May 2026 (UTC)

Tyrese Devonte Dyce (born 19 April 2001) is a Jamaican professional footballer who plays as a defender for National League club Aldershot Town.

== Club career ==
Dyce came through the academy programme at West Bromwich Albion, playing twice in the EFL Trophy during the 2020-21 season for West Bromwich Albion U23s against the senior teams of Swindon Town and Exeter City, scoring in the game against Swindon. He was released by West Brom in the summer of 2021 and signed for Sunderland on a free transfer, joining the Sunderland U23s group. He made his senior professional debut on 10 October 2021 in an EFL Trophy game against Manchester United U23s, scoring a debut goal in a 2–1 win.

On 24 March 2022, Dyce joined National League North side Spennymoor Town on loan for the remainder of the 2021–22 season.

In March 2023, Dyce joined Southern Football League club Gosport Borough, for whom he made five appearances.

On 14 July 2023, Dyce signed for the National League South side Slough Town. He went on to make 31 appearances for the Rebels, scoring four goals.

On 1 June 2024, Dyce moved up a division to sign for Maidenhead United. He made eleven appearances in the 2024-25 season before returning to Slough for 2025-26. On 29 May 2026, it was announced that Dyce would leave Slough Town at the end of his contract in June.

Dyce joined Aldershot Town for the 2026-27 season.

== Playing style ==
Dyce plays primarily as a left back, although is able to play full back, centre back or as a winger playing on either side of the field.

== Career statistics ==
As of end of 2025-26 season

Appearances and goals by club, season and competition
Club	Season	League			National Cup		League Cup		Other		Total	
Club	Season	Division	Apps	Goals	Apps	Goals	Apps	Goals	Apps	Goals	Apps	Goals
West Bromwich Albion U21	2020–21	–							2 (Note: Appearance(s) in EFL Trophy)	1	2	1
Sunderland	2021–22	EFL League One	0	0	0	0	0	0	2	1	2	1
Spennymoor Town (loan)	2021–22	National League North	1	0	0	0	0	0	0	0	1	0
Gosport Borough	2022–23	SFL Premier Division South	5	0	0	0	0	0	0	0	5	0
Slough Town	2023–24	National League South	22	3	7	1	0	0	2 (Note: Appearance(s) in FA Trophy)	0	31	4
Maidenhead United	2024–25	National League	11	0	0	0	0	0	0	0	11	0
Slough Town	2025–26	National League South	31	3	3	0	0	0	0	0	34	3
Career total			70	6	10	1	0	0	6	2	86	9
