= Dennis Cirkin =

Latvian footballer (born 2002)

Personal information
- Full name: Dennis Cirkin
- Date of birth: 6 April 2002 (age 24)
- Place of birth: Dublin, Ireland
- Height: 6 ft 0 in (1.82 m)
- Position: Left-back

Team information
- Current team: Queens Park Rangers
- Number: 19

Youth career
- –2021: Tottenham Hotspur

Senior career*
Years	Team	Apps	(Gls)
2021–2026	Sunderland	114	(8)
2026–	Queens Park Rangers	7	(0)

International career^{‡}
2018	England U16	5	(0)
2018–2019	England U17	6	(0)
2019	England U18	2	(0)
2021	England U20	2	(0)
2026–	Latvia	5	(0)
- * Club domestic league appearances and goals as of 15:06, 29 September 2026 (UTC) ‡ National team caps and goals as of 20:34, 18 November 2026 (UTC)

Dennis Cirkin (Latvian: Denniss Cirkins, born 6 April 2002) is a professional footballer who plays as a left-back for EFL Championship club Queens Park Rangers. Born in Ireland and a former England youth international, he represents the Latvia national team.

== Early life ==
Cirkin was born in Dublin, Ireland to parents from Daugavpils, Latvia and the family then moved to London when he was three years old. His father is of Azerbaijani-Turkish descent from Antakya (Antioch), Hatay, Turkey.

== Club career ==
He attended Wanstead High School while signed to the Tottenham Hotspur academy.

=== Sunderland ===
On 11 August 2021, Cirkin joined Sunderland for an undisclosed fee. On 14 August 2021, he made his debut for Sunderland in an away game against Milton Keynes Dons which Sunderland won 2–1. On 15 October 2022, he scored his first professional goal for Sunderland in a 2–1 home win against Wigan Athletic. In November 2024, the club announced that Cirkin was unavailable to play against Millwall after having surgery on his wrist.

=== Queens Park Rangers ===
On 12 August 2026, Cirkin joined EFL Championship side Queens Park Rangers on a free transfer.

== International career ==
In November 2018, Cirkin was sent off for the England under-17 team in an away game against the Republic of Ireland. Having represented England at U16, U17 and U18 level, Cirkin made his debut for the England U20s during a 6–1 victory over Romania U20s at St. George's Park on 6 September 2021.

On 14 March 2025 Cirkin received his first call up to the England U21 squad however a hamstring injury sustained in a match against Coventry City forced him to withdraw. On 23 May 2025, he was called up to Lee Carsley's squad for the second time for the U21 European Championship, but he had to withdraw again due to a "medical issue".

In March 2026, Cirkin was invited to the training camp of the Latvia national team.

On 25 September 2026, Cirkin made his senior international debut for Latvia in a 2026–27 UEFA Nations League C game against Armenia.

== Career statistics ==
=== Club ===
As of match played 19 September 2026

Appearances and goals by club, season and competition
Club	Season	League			FA Cup		EFL Cup		Other		Total	
Club	Season	Division	Apps	Goals	Apps	Goals	Apps	Goals	Apps	Goals	Apps	Goals
Sunderland	2021–22	League One	34	0	1	0	3	0	3 (Note: Appearances in EFL League One play-offs)	0	41	0
Sunderland	2022–23	Championship	28	5	0	0	0	0	0	0	28	5
Sunderland	2023–24	Championship	8	0	0	0	0	0	—		8	0
Sunderland	2024–25	Championship	36	3	0	0	0	0	3 (Note: Appearances in EFL Championship play-offs)	0	39	3
Sunderland	2025–26	Premier League	8	0	2	0	0	0	—		10	0
Sunderland	Total		114	8	3	0	3	0	6	0	126	8
Queens Park Rangers	2026–27	Championship	7	0	0	0	0	0	—		7	0
Career total			121	8	3	0	3	0	6	0	133	8

=== International ===
As of match played 15 November 2026

Appearances and goals by national team and year
National team	Year	Apps	Goals
Latvia
Latvia	2026	5	0
Total		5	0

== Honours ==
Sunderland

- EFL Championship play-offs: 2025
- EFL League One play-offs: 2022
