= Ethan Kachosa =

English footballer (born 2003)

Personal information
- Full name: Ethan Takudzwa Kachosa
- Date of birth: 23 January 2003 (age 23)
- Place of birth: Leeds, England
- Positions: Defender; winger

Team information
- Current team: Matlock Town

Youth career
- 2016–2021: Leeds United

Senior career*
Years	Team	Apps	(Gls)
2021–2023	Sunderland	0	(0)
2023	→ Guiseley (loan)	6	(1)
2023	Lewes		
2023–2024	Bury		
2024	Yorkshire Amateur		
2024	Rahoveci		
2024	Tadcaster Albion		
2024–2025	Pickering Town		
2025–2026	Wakefield AFC		
2026	Hallam		
2026–	Matlock Town		
- * Club domestic league appearances and goals as of 11:07, 15 October 2026 (UTC)

Ethan Takudzwa Kachosa (born 23 January 2003) is an English footballer who plays as a defender for Northern Premier League Divison One East side Matlock Town.

== Early life ==
Kachosa was born in Leeds, West Yorkshire to a Zimbabwean family and attended Garforth Academy. He joined his local side Leeds United where he signed a two-year scholarship in 2019 after winning the Academy's Players' Player of the Year award. He featured for the under-21s team in September 2020, during a 0–7 defeat to League One side Accrington Stanley in the Football League Trophy, but failed to win a professional contract with the Premier League side and was released at the end of the 2020–21 season.

== Club career ==
Kachosa signed for Sunderland in the summer of 2021 following his release from Leeds, signing a two year professional deal. He made his professional debut on 13 October in a 2–1 win over Manchester United's under-21 side in the Football League Trophy, replacing captain Denver Hume as a substitute in the 71st minute.

In March 2023, Kachosa joined Northern Premier League Premier Division club Guiseley on loan until the end of the season.

In May 2023, he was released by Sunderland following the expiry of his contract.

After a spell with Lewes, Kachosa joined Bury in December 2023.

In March 2024, Kachosa was playing for Northern Counties East League side Yorkshire Amateur.

In July 2024, Kachosa moved to play overseas for the first time, signing for First Football League of Kosovo side Rahoveci.

In September 2024, Kachosa was playing for Northern Counties East Football League side Tadcaster Albion. He later joined league rivals Pickering Town.

In November 2025, Kachosa signed for Wakefield A.F.C, a club in Northern Counties East League Division One. He has predominantly been used by manager Jason Blunt at Right-Wing Back whilst also featuring at Left-Wing Back and both wings. His only goal so far was a wonderful strike against South Leeds at home on the 12th December 2025.

In October 2026 Kachosa, joined Northern Premier League Divison One East side Matlock Town from Hallam.

== International career ==
Kachosa is eligible to play for his country of birth England or Zimbabwe through his family. He is yet to commit to either country.

== Career statistics ==
As of 5 October 2022

Appearances and goals by club, season and competition
Club	Season	League			FA Cup		League Cup		Other		Total	
Club	Season	Division	Apps	Goals	Apps	Goals	Apps	Goals	Apps	Goals	Apps	Goals
Sunderland	2021–22	League One	0	0	0	0	0	0	2	0	2	0
Career total			0	0	0	0	0	0	2	0	2	0
