= Thomas Scott (footballer, born 2003) =

English footballer

Thomas Scott (born 5 June 2003) is an English professional footballer who plays as a central midfielder for EFL Championship club Sunderland.

== Professional career ==
Scott came through the youth programme at Northampton Town, although he didn't make a first team appearance for the club. A free-kick goal by Scott was voted as the club's youth goal of the season in May 2021. Scott signed a professional contract with Sunderland in 2021 after impressing on trial. He joined the club's Under-23s, playing regularly in the Premier League 2.

Scott made his senior professional debut on 19 October 2021 in an EFL Trophy game against Manchester United U-23s.
