= 2022 EFL play-offs =

- Wembley Stadium was the venue for each play-off final
- Season: 2021–22

The English Football League play-offs for the 2021–22 season (referred to as the Sky Bet Play-Offs for sponsorship reasons) were held in May 2022 with all finals being staged at Wembley Stadium in Wembley.

The play-offs begin in each league with two semi-finals which are played over two legs. The teams who finished in 3rd, 4th, 5th and 6th place in the Championship and League One and the 4th, 5th, 6th and 7th-placed teams in League Two compete. The winners of the semi-finals advance to the finals, with the winners gaining promotion for the following season.

All three play-off finals will use Video Assistant Referees (VAR), making it the first time that they have been used in each of the respective leagues.

== Background ==
The English Football League play-offs have been held every year since 1987. They take place for each division following the conclusion of the regular season and are contested by the four clubs finishing below the automatic promotion places. The fixtures are determined by final league position – in the Championship and League One this is 3rd v 6th and 4th v 5th, while in League Two it is 4th v 7th and 5th v 6th.

== Television ==
All English Football League play-off games were broadcast live on Sky Sports. It was simulcast on the ESPN+ streaming platform in the United States.

== Championship ==
=== Semi-finals ===
The final table was confirmed after the final matchday on 7 May 2022, due to Bournemouth beating Nottingham Forest on 3 May 2022; this meant that Nottingham Forest and Huddersfield Town were guaranteed to finish either 3rd or 4th and in the play-offs. Sheffield United and Luton Town won their games against Fulham and Reading respectively, because of this, Middlesbrough and Millwall did not qualify for the play-offs regardless of their results. It meant that Luton played Huddersfield, and Sheffield United played Nottingham Forest in the 1st legs, and vice versa in the 2nd legs.

Final league position – Championship
Pos	Team	Pld	W	D	L	GF	GA	GD	Pts
3	Huddersfield Town	46	23	13	10	64	47	17	82
4	Nottingham Forest	46	23	11	12	73	40	33	80
5	Sheffield United	46	21	12	13	63	45	18	75
6	Luton Town	46	21	12	13	63	55	8	75

==== First leg ====
13 May 2022
19:45 BST

Luton Town	1–1	Huddersfield Town
Bradley 30'	Report	Sinani 12'

Kenilworth Road, Luton
Attendance: 10,005
Referee: Robert Jones
14 May 2022
15:00 BST

Sheffield United	1–2	Nottingham Forest
Robinson 90+1'	Report	Colback 10'; Johnson 71'

Bramall Lane, Sheffield
Attendance: 30,225
Referee: Andre Marriner

==== Second leg ====
16 May 2022
19:45 BST

Huddersfield Town	1–0	Luton Town
Rhodes 82'	Report

John Smith's Stadium, Huddersfield
Attendance: 23,507
Referee: Peter Bankes

Huddersfield Town won 2–1 on aggregate.

17 May 2022
19:45 BST

Nottingham Forest	1–2 (a.e.t.)	Sheffield United
Johnson 19'	Report	Gibbs-White 47'; Fleck 75'
Penalties
Johnson (penalty scored); Cafú (penalty scored); Cook (penalty scored); Lolley (penalty missed)	3–2	(penalty missed) Norwood; (penalty missed) Hourihane; (penalty scored) Berge; (penalty scored) Ndiaye; (penalty missed) Gibbs-White

City Ground, Nottingham
Attendance: 29,015
Referee: Michael Oliver

3–3 on aggregate. Nottingham Forest won 3–2 on penalties.

=== Final ===
The winner, Nottingham Forest, won promotion to the top fight after more than two decades of absence, joining Fulham and Bournemouth in being promoted to the Premier League for the 2022–23 season.

29 May 2022
16:30 BST

Huddersfield Town	0–1	Nottingham Forest
	Report	Colwill 43' (o.g.)

Wembley Stadium, London
Attendance: 80,019
Referee: Jon Moss

== League One ==
=== Semi-finals ===
The final table was confirmed after the final matchday on 30 April 2022, Milton Keynes Dons had already guaranteed a place in the play-offs and would have been promoted if they had a better result than Rotherham United. Sheffield Wednesday and Sunderland won their games against Portsmouth and Morecambe respectively to finish 4th and 5th. Wycombe Wanderers beat Burton Albion and due to Plymouth Argyle losing to MK Dons, Wycombe finished 6th and Plymouth finished 7th. It meant that Wycombe played MK Dons and Sunderland played Sheffield Wednesday in the first legs, and vice versa in the second legs.

Final league position – League One
Pos	Team	Pld	W	D	L	GF	GA	GD	Pts
3	Milton Keynes Dons	46	26	11	9	78	44	34	89
4	Sheffield Wednesday	46	24	13	9	78	50	28	85
5	Sunderland	46	24	12	10	79	53	26	84
6	Wycombe Wanderers	46	23	14	9	75	51	24	83

==== First leg ====
5 May 2022
19:45 BST

Wycombe Wanderers	2–0	Milton Keynes Dons
Tafazolli 38'; Vokes 82'	Report

Adams Park, High Wycombe
Attendance: 8,987
Referee: Darren Bond
6 May 2022
19:45 BST

Sunderland	1–0	Sheffield Wednesday
Stewart 45+1'	Report

Stadium of Light, Sunderland
Attendance: 44,742
Referee: Matthew Donohue

==== Second leg ====
8 May 2022
18:30 BST

Milton Keynes Dons	1–0	Wycombe Wanderers
Parrott 26'	Report

Stadium MK, Milton Keynes
Attendance: 13,012
Referee: Thomas Bramall

Wycombe Wanderers won 2–1 on aggregate.

9 May 2022
19:45 BST

Sheffield Wednesday	1–1	Sunderland
Gregory 74'	Report	Roberts 90+3'

Hillsborough Stadium, Sheffield
Attendance: 32,978
Referee: James Linington

Sunderland won 2–1 on aggregate.

=== Final ===
21 May 2022
15:00 BST

Wycombe Wanderers	0–2	Sunderland
	Report	Embleton 12'; Stewart 79'

Wembley Stadium, London
Attendance: 72,332
Referee: Simon Hooper

== League Two ==
=== Semi-finals ===
The final table was confirmed after the final matchday on 7 May 2022, Bristol Rovers had already secured a play-off place and could still have finished 3rd and gained automatic promotion if they bettered Northampton Town's result in the last game of the season. Northampton Town and Bristol Rovers both won their games, putting both of them on 80 points with the promoted team decided on goal difference. Due to Bristol Rovers winning their game 7–0, it put them both on a +22 goal difference, but Bristol Rovers had scored more goals than Northampton Town (71–60). This meant that against all the odds at the time, Bristol Rovers were promoted and Northampton were condemned to the play-offs. Swindon Town beat Walsall in their game, and Mansfield Town drew to champions Forest Green Rovers, which was enough to qualify for the play-offs. It meant that Mansfield Town played Northampton and Swindon Town played Port Vale in the 1st legs, and vice versa in the 2nd legs.

Final league position – League Two
Pos	Team	Pld	W	D	L	GF	GA	GD	Pts
4	Northampton Town	46	23	11	12	60	38	22	80
5	Port Vale	46	22	12	12	67	46	21	78
6	Swindon Town	46	22	11	13	77	54	23	77
7	Mansfield Town	46	22	11	13	67	52	15	77

==== First leg ====
14 May 2022
19:45 BST

Mansfield Town	2–1	Northampton Town
Oates 13'; Bowery 32'	Report	Koiki 61'

Field Mill, Mansfield
Attendance: 7,469
Referee: Anthony Backhouse
15 May 2022
12:00 BST

Swindon Town	2–1	Port Vale
McKirdy 26', 68'	Report	Wilson 83'

County Ground, Swindon
Attendance: 14,086
Referee: Ross Joyce

==== Second leg ====
18 May 2022
19:45 BST

Northampton Town	0–1	Mansfield Town
	Report	McLaughlin 32'

Sixfields Stadium, Northampton
Attendance: 7,619
Referee: Ben Toner

Mansfield Town won 3–1 on aggregate.

19 May 2022
19:45 BST

Port Vale	1–0 (a.e.t.)	Swindon Town
Wilson 8'	Report
Penalties
Wilson (penalty scored); Worrall (penalty missed); Edmondson (penalty missed); Charsley (penalty scored); Pett (penalty scored); Garrity (penalty scored); Gibbons (penalty scored); Benning (penalty scored)	6–5	(penalty scored) Payne; (penalty scored) Gladwin; (penalty missed) McKirdy; (penalty scored) Reed; (penalty missed) Davison; (penalty scored) Conroy; (penalty scored) Egbo; (penalty missed) Iandolo

Vale Park, Stoke-on-Trent
Attendance: 11,669
Referee: Seb Stockbridge

2–2 on aggregate. Port Vale won 6–5 on penalties.

=== Final ===
28 May 2022
16:00 BST

Mansfield Town	0–3	Port Vale
	Report	Harratt 20'; Wilson 24'; Benning 85'

Wembley Stadium, London
Attendance: 37,303
Referee: Jarred Gillett
