= 2026–27 Sunderland A.F.C. season =

English football club season

Sunderland
2026–27 season
- Owner: Kyril Louis-Dreyfus (64%); Juan Sartori (36%)
- Chairman: Kyril Louis-Dreyfus
- Head coach: Régis Le Bris
- Stadium: Stadium of Light
- Premier League: 19th
- FA Cup: Third round
- EFL Cup: Quarter-finals
- UEFA Europa League: League phase
- Top goalscorer: League: Brian Brobbey; Enzo Le Fée (3 each); All: Enzo Le Fée (4)
| Home colours | Away colours | Third colours |

The 2026–27 season is the 148th season in the history of Sunderland Association Football Club, and the club's second consecutive season in the Premier League. In addition to the domestic league, the club is also participating in the FA Cup, the EFL Cup, and the UEFA Europa League.

Last season was the first time in the club's history that they qualified for a European competition through a league position, and this is also their first time competing in any European competition since the 1973–74 season.

== Transfers and contracts ==
=== In ===
| Date | Pos. | Player | From | Fee | Ref. |
First team
| 15 July 2026 | RB | (Belgium) Thomas Meunier | (France) Lille | Free | |
| 21 August 2026 | LB | (France) Dayann Methalie | (France) Toulouse | £23,900,000 (Note: A potential further £1,700,000 in add-ons) | |
| 24 August 2026 | DM | (Democratic Republic of the Congo) Jules Ahoka | (Belgium) Antwerp | £8,600,000 | |
| 1 September 2026 | LW | (Belgium) Malick Fofana | (France) Lyon | £25,700,000 (Note: A potential further £4,300,000 in add-ons) | |
| 1 September 2026 | ST | (Ecuador) Juan Riquelme Angulo | (Ecuador) Independiente del Valle | £5,000,000 | |
Academy
| 1 July 2026 | RW | (England) Ethan Berry | (England) Crystal Palace | Free | |
| 1 July 2026 | CM | (Northern Ireland) Adam Nelson | (Northern Ireland) Glentoran | Free | |
| 26 July 2026 | CB | (Northern Ireland) Alfie Pollock | (Northern Ireland) Glenavon | Undisclosed | |

=== Out ===
| Date | Pos. | Player | To | Fee | Ref. |
First team
| 18 June 2026 | AM | (England) Harrison Jones | (England) Peterborough United | Undisclosed | |
| 26 June 2026 | CB | (England) Zak Johnson | (England) York City | Undisclosed | |
| 1 July 2026 | ST | (Ukraine) Nazariy Rusyn | (Ukraine) Karpaty Lviv | Undisclosed | |
| 5 July 2026 | ST | (Spain) Eliezer Mayenda | (France) Rennes | £22,000,000 | |
| 16 July 2026 | RB | (France) Timothée Pembélé | (France) Le Havre | Undisclosed | |
| 4 August 2026 | ST | (Nigeria) Ahmed Abdullahi | (Turkey) Eyüpspor | Undisclosed | |
| 10 August 2026 | LB | (Democratic Republic of the Congo) Arthur Masuaku | (Turkey) Konyaspor | Undisclosed | |
| 11 August 2026 | CB | (Norway) Leo Hjelde | (Belgium) Mechelen | Undisclosed | |
| 11 August 2026 | GK | (England) Anthony Patterson | (Wales) Wrexham | £10,000,000 | |
| 1 September 2026 | ST | (Portugal) Luís Semedo | (France) Clermont Foot | Undisclosed | |
Academy

=== Loans in ===
| Date | Pos. | Player | From | Date until | Ref. |
First team
| 1 September 2026 | CB | (Austria) Kevin Danso | (England) Tottenham Hotspur | End of Season | |
Academy

=== Loans out ===
| Date | Pos. | Player | To | Loaned until | Ref. |
First team
| 20 June 2026 (Note: The loan was announced on 18 June, and would officially begin on 20 June once the Serbian SuperLiga transfer window opened.) | AM | (Serbia) Milan Aleksić | (Serbia) Partizan | End of season | |
| 27 August 2026 | CB | (Netherlands) Jenson Seelt | (Wales) Swansea City | End of season | |
| 2 September 2026 | LW | (Ivory Coast) Simon Adingra | (Netherlands) Ajax | End of season | |
Academy
| 29 June 2026 | GK | (England) Matty Young | (England) Huddersfield Town | End of season | |
| 9 October 2026 | LB | (England) Bayley Hester | (England) Heaton Stannington | 9 November 2026 | |
| 9 October 2026 | CB | (England) Finlay Holcroft | (England) Spennymoor Town | 3 January 2027 (Note: On 4 November, Holcroft's initial one-month loan at Spennymoor Town was extended until January.) | |
| 9 October 2026 | CM | (England) Jaydon Jones | (England) Hebburn Town | 9 November 2026 | |
| 14 October 2026 | CB | (England) Luke Bell | (England) Darlington | 15 November 2026 | |
| 23 October 2026 | CF | (Australia) Marcus Neill | (England) Morecambe | 19 November 2026 | |

=== Released / Out of contract ===
| Date | Pos. | Player | Subsequent club | Joined date | Ref. |
First team
| 30 June 2026 | CM | (England) Dan Neil | (Scotland) Rangers | 1 July 2026 | |
| 30 June 2026 | LB | (Latvia) Dennis Cirkin | (England) Queens Park Rangers | 12 August 2026 | |
| 30 June 2026 | RW | (Burkina Faso) Bertrand Traoré | (England) Wolverhampton Wanderers | 7 September 2026 | |
| 30 June 2026 | RB | (Wales) Niall Huggins | | | |
Academy
| 30 June 2026 | LB | (England) Oliver Bainbridge | (England) Boreham Wood | 1 July 2026 | |
| 30 June 2026 | RB | (England) Tom Lavery | (England) Gateshead | 1 July 2026 | |
| 30 June 2026 | LW | (Northern Ireland) Rhys Walsh | (Northern Ireland) Glentoran | 9 July 2026 | |
| 30 June 2026 | RB | (England) George Bell | | | |
| 30 June 2026 | DM | (England) Marshall Burke | | | |
| 30 June 2026 | GK | (England) Dan Cameron | (England) Gateshead | 15 August 2026 | |
| 30 June 2026 | DM | (Germany) Elias Lenz | | | |
| 30 June 2026 | RW | (England) Ethan Moore | (England) Kidderminster Harriers | 17 July 2026 | |
| 30 June 2026 | GK | (England) Adam Richardson | | | |
| 30 June 2026 | DM | (Latvia) Ivan Struk | (United States) Siena Saints | 31 July 2026 | |
| 30 June 2026 | ST | (England) Jake Waters | (England) Hebburn Town | 7 August 2026 | |

=== New contracts ===
| Date | Pos. | Player | Contract expiry | Ref. |
First team
| 25 August 2026 | LW | (England) Romaine Mundle | 30 June 2030 | |
| 27 August 2026 | ST | (Haiti) Wilson Isidor | 30 June 2030 | |
| 27 August 2026 | CB | (Netherlands) Jenson Seelt | 30 June 2030 | |
| 28 August 2026 | GK | (Netherlands) Robin Roefs | 30 June 2031 | |
| 23 September 2026 | CM | (France) Enzo Le Fée | 30 June 2031 | |
| 3 November 2026 | ST | (Netherlands) Brian Brobbey | 30 June 2031 | |
Academy
| 1 July 2026 | RB | (England) Jenson Jones | 30 June 2028 | |
| 2 July 2026 | CM | (England) Joe Neild | Undisclosed (Note: First professional contract) | |
| 2 July 2026 | LW | (England) Felix Scott | Undisclosed | |
| 3 July 2026 | CAM | (England) Charlie Dinsdale | Undisclosed | |
| 3 July 2026 | LB | (England) Bayley Hester | Undisclosed | |
| 6 July 2026 | LB | (England) Archie Lightfoot | Undisclosed | |
| 7 July 2026 | ST | (Armenia) Finn Geragusian | Undisclosed | |
| 7 July 2026 | CAM | (England) Jack Whittaker | 30 June 2028 | |
| 20 July 2026 | ST | (Australia) Marcus Neill | Undisclosed | |
| 20 July 2026 | LW | (Ukraine) Timur Tutierov | Undisclosed | |
| 21 July 2026 | CB | (England) Finlay Holcroft | Undisclosed | |
| 21 July 2026 | CM | (England) Liam Hunt | Undisclosed | |
| 7 September 2026 | GK | (England) Joe Cowan | Undisclosed | |

== Pre-season and friendlies ==
On 4 March, Sunderland announced a pre-season tour in the United States with matches against Leeds United, Liverpool and Wrexham. In June, three further friendlies were confirmed, to complete the schedule, against York City, Lens and Rennes.

Win Draw Loss Fixtures

| 18 July 2026 Friendly | York City | 1−5 | Sunderland | Huntington |
| 15:00 BST | Olley 55' | Report | Le Fée 7', 45'; Rigg 37'; Tutierov 44'; Proctor 56' | Stadium: LNER Community Stadium |

| 25 July 2026 Friendly | Liverpool | 4–2 | Sunderland | Nashville, United States |
| 17:00 CDT | Morrison 13'; Szoboszlai 56'; Chiesa 72'; Koumas 85' | Report | Ballard (yellow card) 20'; Le Fée 28'; Tutierov 49' | Stadium: Geodis Park; Attendance: 24,897 |

| 30 July 2026 Friendly | Leeds United | 1–0 | Sunderland | Harrison, United States |
| 19:30 EDT | Nmecha 8' | Report | | Stadium: Sports Illustrated Stadium |

| 2 August 2026 Friendly | Sunderland | 1–0 | Wrexham | Chester, United States |
| 12:00 EDT | Mukiele 34'; Diarra (yellow card) 61'; Seelt (yellow card) 65' | Report | Hyam (yellow card) 32'; Dobson (yellow card) 56' | Stadium: Subaru Park |

| 8 August 2026 Friendly | Lens | 4–1 | Sunderland | Avion, France |
| 12:00 CEST | Seddik; Aguilar (pen.); Fernoc 77'; Diarra 82' | Report | Proctor 11', (penalty missed); Ta Bi (penalty missed) | Stadium: Stade François Blin; Attendance: 0 (BCD) |

| 8 August 2026 Friendly | Lens | 0–2 | Sunderland | Lens, France |
| 17:00 CEST | | Report | Hume 66'; Isidor 82' | Stadium: Stade Bollaert-Delelis |

| 15 August 2026 Friendly | Sunderland | 2−1 | Rennes | Monkwearmouth |
| 15:00 BST | Brobbey 66'; Hume 70' | Report | Lepaul 32' (pen.) | Stadium: Stadium of Light |

== Competitions ==
=== Overall record ===
| Competition | First match | Last match | Starting round | Final position | Record | | | | | | | |
| Competition | First match | Last match | Starting round | Final position | Pld | W | D | L | GF | GA | GD | Win % |
|---|---|---|---|---|---|---|---|---|---|---|---|---|
| Premier League | 22 August 2026 | 30 May 2027 | Matchday 1 | TBD | 10 | 2 | 2 | 6 | 8 | 17 | −9 | 20.00 |
| FA Cup | January 2027 | TBD | Third round | TBD | 0 | 0 | 0 | 0 | 0 | 0 | +0 | — |
| EFL Cup | 8 September 2026 | TBD | Third round | TBD | 2 | 2 | 0 | 0 | 4 | 2 | +2 | 100.00 |
| UEFA Europa League | 16 September 2026 | TBD | League phase | TBD | 4 | 2 | 1 | 1 | 4 | 4 | +0 | 50.00 |
| Total | | | | | 16 | 6 | 3 | 7 | 16 | 23 | −7 | 37.50 |

Last updated: 8 November 2026
Source: Soccerway

=== Premier League ===
==== League table ====
| Pos | Team | Pld | W | D | L | GF | GA | GD | Pts | Qualification or relegation |
|---|---|---|---|---|---|---|---|---|---|---|
| 16 | Nottingham Forest | 10 | 2 | 3 | 5 | 9 | 13 | −4 | 9 | |
| 17 | Coventry City | 10 | 3 | 0 | 7 | 10 | 19 | −9 | 9 | |
| 18 | Manchester United | 10 | 1 | 5 | 4 | 14 | 19 | −5 | 8 | Relegation to EFL Championship |
| 19 | Sunderland | 10 | 2 | 2 | 6 | 8 | 17 | −9 | 8 | Relegation to EFL Championship |
| 20 | Crystal Palace | 10 | 2 | 1 | 7 | 10 | 24 | −14 | 7 | Relegation to EFL Championship |

Updated to match(es) played on 21 November 2026. Source: Premier League
Rules for classification: 1) Points; 2) Goal difference; 3) Goals scored; 4) If the champions, relegated teams or qualified teams for UEFA competitions cannot be determined by rules 1 to 3 following the completion of the competition, rules 4.1 to 4.3 are applied between such teams – 4.1) Head-to-head points; 4.2) Head-to-head away goals; 4.3) Play-off at a neutral site.

==== Results summary ====
| Overall | | | | | | | | Home | | | | | | Away | | | | | |
| Pld | W | D | L | GF | GA | GD | Pts | W | D | L | GF | GA | GD | W | D | L | GF | GA | GD |
|---|---|---|---|---|---|---|---|---|---|---|---|---|---|---|---|---|---|---|---|
| 11 | 2 | 3 | 6 | 8 | 17 | −9 | 9 | 2 | 1 | 2 | 2 | 4 | −2 | 0 | 2 | 4 | 6 | 13 | −7 |

Last updated: 8 November 2026.
Source: Soccerway

==== Results by round ====
| Round | 1 | 2 | 3 | 4 | 5 | 6 | 7 | 8 | 9 | 10 | 11 | 12 | 13 | 14 | 15 | 16 | 17 | 18 | 19 | 20 | 21 | 22 | 23 |
|---|---|---|---|---|---|---|---|---|---|---|---|---|---|---|---|---|---|---|---|---|---|---|---|
| Ground | A | H | A | H | A | H | A | H | A | H | A | H | A | A | H | H | A | A | H | H | A | H | A |
| Result | L | W | D | L | L | L | L | D | L | W | D | | | | | | | | | | | | |
| Position | 14 | 11 | 12 | 14 | 14 | 17 | 20 | 20 | 20 | 19 | | | | | | | | | | | | | |
| Points | 0 | 3 | 4 | 4 | 4 | 4 | 4 | 5 | 5 | 8 | 9 | | | | | | | | | | | | |

Updated to match(es) played on 21 November 2026. Source: Premier League
A = Away; H = Home; W = Win; D = Draw; L = Loss; P = Postponed

==== Matches ====
On 19 June 2026, the Premier League fixtures were released.

Win Draw Loss Fixtures

| 22 August 2026 1 | Ipswich Town | 2–1 | Sunderland | Ipswich |
| 15:00 BST | Emersonn 24'; Clarke 90' | Report | Ballard (yellow card) 36'; Angulo 39', (yellow card) 55'; O'Nien (yellow card) 63' | Stadium: Portman Road; Attendance: 29,669; Referee: Farai Hallam |

| 30 August 2026 2 | Sunderland | 1–0 | Fulham | Sunderland |
| 14:00 BST | Isidor 75' | Report | Andersen (yellow card) 35'; Palacios (yellow card) 59' | Stadium: Stadium of Light; Attendance: 46,781; Referee: Michael Salisbury |
Note: Fixture was initially scheduled for 29 August, but was rescheduled for live Sky Sports broadcasting.

| 5 September 2026 3 | Brentford | 1–1 | Sunderland | Brentford |
| 15:00 BST | Sangaré (yellow card) 30'; Janelt 57', (yellow card) 62'; Yarmolyuk (yellow card) 69' | Report | Sadiki (yellow card) 14'; Le Fée 82' (pen.); Xhaka (yellow card) 88' | Stadium: Brentford Community Stadium; Attendance: 17,131; Referee: Thomas Bramall |

| 12 September 2026 4 | Sunderland | 0–2 | Arsenal | Sunderland |
| 20:00 BST | Mandava (yellow card) 28' (yellow-red card) 90+6'; Le Fée (penalty missed) 56'; Ballard (yellow card) 66'; Xhaka (yellow card) 69'; Brobbey (yellow card) 81'; Mukiele (yellow card) 90+1' | Report | Bruno Guimarães 58'; Gabriel (yellow card) 90+1'; Havertz (yellow card) 90+3'; Saka 90+7' (pen.) | Stadium: Stadium of Light; Attendance: 46,861; Referee: John Brooks |
Note: Fixture was initially scheduled for a 15:00 kick-off, but was pushed back for live TNT Sports broadcasting.

| 20 September 2026 5 | Manchester City | 5–3 | Sunderland | Manchester |
| 14:00 BST | Fernández 9'; Cherki 29'; Semenyo 43', 57'; Haaland 81' | Report | Methalie (yellow card) 8'; Brobbey 12', 33', 59' | Stadium: Etihad Stadium; Attendance: 60,312; Referee: Robert Jones |
Note: Fixture was initially scheduled for 19 September, but was pushed back a day due to EFL Cup involvements on the preceding Thursday.

| 10 October 2026 6 | Sunderland | 0–2 | Brighton & Hove Albion | Sunderland |
| 15:00 BST | | Report | Boscagli (yellow card) 36'; De Cuyper 53'; Struijk (red card) 57'; Hadjam 90+3' | Stadium: Stadium of Light; Attendance: 47,196; Referee: Thomas Bramall |

| 18 October 2026 7 | Bournemouth | 2–0 | Sunderland | Bournemouth |
| 14:00 BST | Tavernier 6'; Silva (yellow card) 26'; Cook (yellow card) 45+6'; Evanilson 48'; Christie (yellow card) 79' | Report | Danso (red card) 17'; Alderete (yellow card) 40'; Rigg (yellow card) 65' | Stadium: Dean Court; Attendance: 12,004; Referee: Craig Pawson |
Note: Fixture was initially scheduled for 17 October, but was rescheduled for live Sky Sports broadcasting.

| 25 October 2026 8 | Sunderland | 0–0 | Leeds United | Sunderland |
| 16:30 BST | Mandava (yellow card) 39' | Report | Ampadu (yellow card) 29'; Bogle (yellow card) 67' | Stadium: Stadium of Light; Attendance: 46,182; Referee: Stuart Attwell |
Note: Fixture was initially scheduled for 24 October, but was rescheduled for live Sky Sports broadcasting.

| 31 October 2026 9 | Coventry City | 3–1 | Sunderland | Coventry |
| 15:00 GMT | Torp (yellow card) 7'; Sakamoto 17', (yellow card) 55'; Awoniyi 37'; Rudoni 52' | Report | Le Fée 67' (pen.); Alderete (yellow card) 90+4' (yellow-red card) 90+9' | Stadium: Coventry Building Society Arena; Attendance: 31,455; Referee: Simon Hooper |

| 8 November 2026 10 | Sunderland | 1–0 | Chelsea | Sunderland |
| 14:00 GMT | Ahoka (yellow card) 21'; Le Fée 36' (pen.); Meunier (yellow card) 50'; Brobbey (yellow card) 53'; O'Nien (yellow card) 90'; Angulo (yellow card) 90+4' | Report | Colwill (yellow card) 35'; Neto (yellow card) 55'; Caicedo (yellow card) 76'; Fofana (yellow card) 90' | Stadium: Stadium of Light; Attendance: 46,388; Referee: Jarred Gillett |
Note: Fixture was initially scheduled for 7 November, but was pushed back a day due to UEFA Europa League commitments on the preceding Thursday.

| 21 November 2026 11 | Aston Villa | 0–0 | Sunderland | Birmingham |
| 15:00 GMT | Goretzka (yellow card) 54'; Maatsen (yellow card) 66' | Report | Hume (yellow card) 38'; Angulo (yellow card) 85' | Stadium: Villa Park; Referee: Andy Madley |

| 29 November 2026 12 | Sunderland | v | Tottenham Hotspur | Sunderland |
| 14:05 GMT | | | | Stadium: Stadium of Light |
Note: Fixture was initially scheduled for 28 November, but was pushed back a day due to UEFA Europa League commitments on the preceding Thursday.

| 2 December 2026 13 | Liverpool | v | Sunderland | Liverpool |
| 20:00 GMT | | | | Stadium: Anfield |
Note: Fixture was initially scheduled for a 20:00 kick-off, but was brought forward half-an-hour for live Sky Sports broadcasting.

| 6 December 2026 14 | Newcastle United | v | Sunderland | Newcastle upon Tyne |
| 14:00 GMT | | | | Stadium: St James' Park |
Note: Fixture was initially scheduled for 5 December, but was pushed back a day for live Sky Sports broadcasting.

| 13 December 2026 15 | Sunderland | v | Nottingham Forest | Sunderland |
| 14:00 GMT | | | | Stadium: Stadium of Light |
Note: Fixture was initially scheduled for 12 December, but was pushed back a day for live Sky Sports broadcasting.

| 20 December 2026 16 | Sunderland | v | Crystal Palace | Sunderland |
| 14:00 GMT | | | | Stadium: Stadium of Light |
Note: Fixture was initially scheduled for 19 December, but was pushed back a day for live Sky Sports broadcasting.

| 26 December 2026 17 | Everton | v | Sunderland | Liverpool |
| 15:00 GMT | | | | Stadium: Hill Dickinson Stadium |

| 30 December 2026 18 | Manchester United | v | Sunderland | Trafford |
| 19:30 GMT | | | | Stadium: Old Trafford |

| 2 January 2027 19 | Sunderland | v | Hull City | Sunderland |
| 15:00 GMT | | | | Stadium: Stadium of Light |

| 5 January 2027 20 | Sunderland | v | Liverpool | Sunderland |
| 20:15 GMT | | | | Stadium: Stadium of Light |

| 16 January 2026 21 | Chelsea | v | Sunderland | Fulham |
| 15:00 GMT | | | | Stadium: Stamford Bridge |

| 24 January 2027 22 | Sunderland | v | Coventry City | Sunderland |
| 14:00 GMT | | | | Stadium: Stadium of Light |
Note: Fixture was initially scheduled for 23 January, but was pushed back a day due to the ongoing participation in the UEFA Europa League the preceding Thursday.

| 31 January 2027 23 | Tottenham Hotspur | v | Sunderland | Tottenham |
| 14:00 GMT | | | | Stadium: Tottenham Hotspur Stadium |
Note: Fixture was initially scheduled for 23 January, but was pushed back a day due to the ongoing participation in the UEFA Europa League the preceding Thursday.

=== FA Cup ===
As a Premier League club, Sunderland enter the competition in the third round.

Win Draw Loss Fixtures

=== EFL Cup ===
As a Premier League club competing in a European competition, Sunderland entered the EFL Cup in the third round, and were drawn at home against Hull City. They were then drawn at home to Brentford in the fourth round, and away to Crystal Palace in the quarter-finals.

Win Draw Loss Fixtures

| 8 September 2026 Third round | Sunderland | 1–0 | Hull City | Sunderland |
| 19:45 BST | O'Nien (yellow card) 62'; Taibi 71' | Report | Gourna-Douath (yellow card) 54'; Egan (yellow card) 72'; Stroud (yellow card) 90+4' | Stadium: Stadium of Light; Attendance: 25,472; Referee: Paul Tierney |

| 28 October 2026 Fourth round | Sunderland | 3–2 | Brentford | Sunderland |
| 19:45 GMT | Talbi 26'; Tutyerov 29'; Fofana 39'; Rigg (yellow card) 89' | Report | Wilson 42'; Schade (yellow card) 74'; Janelt (yellow card) 83'; Schuster (yellow card) 85'; Thiago 90+4' | Stadium: Stadium of Light; Attendance: 24,305; Referee: Gavin Ward |

| w/c 14 December 2026 Quarter-finals | Crystal Palace | v | Sunderland | Selhurst |
| TBA GMT | | Report | | Stadium: Selhurst Park |

=== UEFA Europa League ===
==== League phase ====
Sunderland were drawn against AZ, Dinamo Zagreb, Jagiellonia Białystok, and Levski Sofia at home, and Torreense, Lech Poznań, Milan, and Anderlecht away in the league phase.

| Pos | Team | Pld | W | D | L | GF | GA | GD | Pts | Qualification |
|---|---|---|---|---|---|---|---|---|---|---|
| 9 | (Croatia) Dinamo Zagreb | 4 | 2 | 1 | 1 | 5 | 4 | +1 | 7 | Advance to knockout phase play-offs (seeded) |
| 10 | (Bulgaria) Levski Sofia | 4 | 2 | 1 | 1 | 4 | 3 | +1 | 7 | Advance to knockout phase play-offs (seeded) |
| 11 | (England) Sunderland | 4 | 2 | 1 | 1 | 4 | 4 | 0 | 7 | Advance to knockout phase play-offs (seeded) |
| 12 | (Netherlands) NEC | 4 | 2 | 1 | 1 | 8 | 9 | −1 | 7 | Advance to knockout phase play-offs (seeded) |
| 13 | (France) Lyon | 4 | 2 | 1 | 1 | 6 | 7 | −1 | 7 | Advance to knockout phase play-offs (seeded) |

Updated to match(es) played on 5 November 2026. Source: UEFA
Rules for classification: League phase tiebreakers

| Round | 1 | 2 | 3 | 4 | 5 | 6 | 7 | 8 |
|---|---|---|---|---|---|---|---|---|
| Ground | H | A | A | H | H | A | A | H |
| Result | W | W | D | L | | | | |
| Position | 15 | 9 | 9 | 11 | | | | |
| Points | 3 | 6 | 7 | 7 | | | | |

Updated to match(es) played on 5 November 2026. Source: UEFA
A = Away; H = Home; W = Win; D = Draw; L = Loss

Win Draw Loss Fixtures

| 16 September 2026 1 | Sunderland (England) | 1–0 | (Netherlands) AZ | Sunderland, England |
| 20:00 BST | Hume (yellow card) 22'; Alderete (yellow card) 30'; Le Fée 66' (pen.); Mukiele (yellow card) 72' | Report | Oufkir (yellow card) 39'; Patati (yellow card) 65' | Stadium: Stadium of Light; Attendance: 45,555; Referee: Jérémie Pignard (France) |

| 15 October 2026 2 | Torreense (Portugal) | 1–2 | (England) Sunderland | Leiria, Portugal |
| 17:45 WEST | Feltes 37'; Mutombo (yellow card) 43' | Report | Hume (yellow card) 45'; Ahoka 67'; Le Fée (yellow card) 79'; Mukiele (yellow card) 85'; Sadiki 90+3' | Stadium: Estádio Dr. Magalhães Pessoa; Attendance: 6,321; Referee: Enea Jorgji (Albania) |
Note: The match was played at Estádio Dr. Magalhães Pessoa in Leiria, instead of Torreense's regular stadium, Estádio Manuel Marques in Torres Vedras, which did not meet UEFA requirements.

| 22 October 2026 3 | Lech Poznań (Poland) | 1–1 | (England) Sunderland | Poznań, Poland |
| 18:45 CEST | Bengtsson 70' | Report | Tutyerov 2'; Danso (yellow card) 41' | Stadium: Poznań Stadium; Attendance: 34,606; Referee: Balázs Berke (Hungary) |

| 5 November 2026 4 | Sunderland (England) | 0–2 | (Croatia) Dinamo Zagreb | Sunderland, England |
| 20:00 GMT | Xhaka (yellow card) 28'; Danso (yellow card) 36'; Hume (yellow card) 55' | Report | Stojković 22'; Galešić (yellow card) 25'; Beljo 39'; Kačavenda (yellow card) 46' | Stadium: Stadium of Light; Attendance: 44,269; Referee: Andrea Colombo (Italy) |

| 26 November 2026 5 | Sunderland (England) | v | (Poland) Jagiellonia Białystok | Sunderland, England |
| 20:00 GMT | | Report | | Stadium: Stadium of Light |

| 10 December 2026 6 | Milan (Italy) | v | (England) Sunderland | Milan, Italy |
| 21:00 CET | | Report | | Stadium: San Siro |

| 21 January 2027 7 | Anderlecht (Belgium) | v | (England) Sunderland | Anderlecht, Belgium |
| 21:00 CET | | Report | | Stadium: Constant Vanden Stock Stadium |

| 28 January 2027 8 | Sunderland (England) | v | (Bulgaria) Levski Sofia | Sunderland, England |
| 20:00 GMT | | Report | | Stadium: Stadium of Light |

== Statistics ==
=== Appearances ===
As of match played 8 November 2026

Players with no appearances are not included on the list, italics indicate a loaned in player.

| No. | Pos | Nat | Player | Total | | Premier League | | FA Cup | | EFL Cup | | Europa League | |
| No. | Pos | Nat | Player | Apps | Goals | Apps | Goals | Apps | Goals | Apps | Goals | Apps | Goals |
|---|---|---|---|---|---|---|---|---|---|---|---|---|---|
| 4 | DF | (Austria) AUT | Kevin Danso | 9 | 0 | 5+0 | 0 | 0+0 | 0 | 1+0 | 0 | 3+0 | 0 |
| 5 | DF | (Northern Ireland) NIR | Daniel Ballard | 6 | 0 | 5+0 | 0 | 0+0 | 0 | 0+0 | 0 | 0+1 | 0 |
| 6 | DF | (France) FRA | Dayann Methalie | 7 | 0 | 1+1 | 0 | 0+0 | 0 | 2+0 | 0 | 3+0 | 0 |
| 7 | FW | (Morocco) MAR | Chemsdine Talbi | 6 | 2 | 1+3 | 0 | 0+0 | 0 | 2+0 | 2 | 0+0 | 0 |
| 8 | MF | (Republic of Ireland) IRL | Alan Browne | 2 | 0 | 0+0 | 0 | 0+0 | 0 | 1+1 | 0 | 0+0 | 0 |
| 9 | FW | (Netherlands) NED | Brian Brobbey | 10 | 3 | 8+0 | 3 | 0+0 | 0 | 0+0 | 0 | 0+2 | 0 |
| 10 | FW | (Ecuador) ECU | Nilson Angulo | 13 | 1 | 8+1 | 1 | 0+0 | 0 | 0+0 | 0 | 3+1 | 0 |
| 11 | MF | (England) ENG | Chris Rigg | 12 | 0 | 3+3 | 0 | 0+0 | 0 | 1+1 | 0 | 2+2 | 0 |
| 12 | DF | (Belgium) BEL | Thomas Meunier | 12 | 0 | 7+1 | 0 | 0+0 | 0 | 0+2 | 0 | 1+1 | 0 |
| 13 | DF | (England) ENG | Luke O'Nien | 9 | 0 | 4+1 | 0 | 0+0 | 0 | 1+1 | 0 | 2+0 | 0 |
| 14 | FW | (England) ENG | Romaine Mundle | 1 | 0 | 0+1 | 0 | 0+0 | 0 | 0+0 | 0 | 0+0 | 0 |
| 15 | DF | (Paraguay) PAR | Omar Alderete | 9 | 0 | 2+2 | 0 | 0+0 | 0 | 2+0 | 0 | 3+0 | 0 |
| 17 | DF | (Mozambique) MOZ | Reinildo Mandava | 13 | 0 | 9+0 | 0 | 0+0 | 0 | 0+0 | 0 | 1+3 | 0 |
| 18 | FW | (Haiti) HAI | Wilson Isidor | 11 | 1 | 1+7 | 1 | 0+0 | 0 | 1+0 | 0 | 2+0 | 0 |
| 19 | MF | (Senegal) SEN | Habib Diarra | 6 | 0 | 0+4 | 0 | 0+0 | 0 | 1+0 | 0 | 1+0 | 0 |
| 20 | DF | (France) FRA | Nordi Mukiele | 11 | 0 | 8+0 | 0 | 0+0 | 0 | 0+0 | 0 | 2+1 | 0 |
| 22 | GK | (Netherlands) NED | Robin Roefs | 14 | 0 | 10+0 | 0 | 0+0 | 0 | 0+0 | 0 | 4+0 | 0 |
| 27 | MF | (Democratic Republic of the Congo) COD | Noah Sadiki | 14 | 1 | 10+0 | 0 | 0+0 | 0 | 0+0 | 0 | 2+2 | 1 |
| 28 | MF | (France) FRA | Enzo Le Fée | 14 | 4 | 10+0 | 3 | 0+0 | 0 | 0+0 | 0 | 1+3 | 1 |
| 29 | MF | (Democratic Republic of the Congo) COD | Jules Ahoka | 7 | 1 | 0+2 | 0 | 0+0 | 0 | 2+0 | 0 | 3+0 | 1 |
| 31 | GK | (Sweden) SWE | Melker Ellborg | 2 | 0 | 0+0 | 0 | 0+0 | 0 | 2+0 | 0 | 0+0 | 0 |
| 32 | DF | (Northern Ireland) NIR | Trai Hume | 14 | 0 | 7+2 | 0 | 0+0 | 0 | 1+0 | 0 | 2+2 | 0 |
| 34 | MF | (Switzerland) SUI | Granit Xhaka | 14 | 0 | 10+0 | 0 | 0+0 | 0 | 0+0 | 0 | 3+1 | 0 |
| 37 | FW | (Ivory Coast) CIV | Jocelin Ta Bi | 3 | 0 | 0+1 | 0 | 0+0 | 0 | 2+0 | 0 | 0+0 | 0 |
| 39 | FW | (Belgium) BEL | Malick Fofana | 11 | 1 | 0+5 | 0 | 0+0 | 0 | 2+0 | 1 | 4+0 | 0 |
| 49 | FW | (England) ENG | Felix Scott | 1 | 0 | 0+0 | 0 | 0+0 | 0 | 0+1 | 0 | 0+0 | 0 |
| 50 | FW | (Ecuador) ECU | Juan Riquelme Angulo | 1 | 0 | 0+1 | 0 | 0+0 | 0 | 0+0 | 0 | 0+0 | 0 |
| 57 | FW | (Ukraine) UKR | Timur Tutierov | 6 | 2 | 1+1 | 0 | 0+0 | 0 | 1+1 | 1 | 2+0 | 1 |
| 77 | MF | (England) ENG | Tom Proctor | 2 | 0 | 0+0 | 0 | 0+0 | 0 | 0+2 | 0 | 0+0 | 0 |

=== Assists ===
As of match played 8 November 2026

Includes all competitive matches. The list is sorted by squad number when number of assists are equal. Players with no assists not included in the list.

| Rank | Pos. | No. | Player | Premier League | FA Cup | EFL Cup | Europa League | Total |
|---|---|---|---|---|---|---|---|---|
| 1 | FW | 10 | (Ecuador) Nilson Angulo | 1 | 0 | 0 | 1 | 2 |
| 1 | DF | 12 | (Belgium) Thomas Meunier | 1 | 0 | 1 | 0 | 2 |
| 1 | FW | 37 | (Ivory Coast) Jocelin Ta Bi | 0 | 0 | 2 | 0 | 2 |
| 4 | FW | 9 | (Netherlands) Brian Brobbey | 1 | 0 | 0 | 0 | 1 |
| 4 | MF | 19 | (Senegal) Habib Diarra | 1 | 0 | 0 | 0 | 1 |
| 4 | DF | 20 | (France) Nordi Mukiele | 0 | 0 | 0 | 1 | 1 |
| 4 | FW | 28 | (France) Enzo Le Fée | 1 | 0 | 0 | 0 | 1 |
| 4 | MF | 34 | (Switzerland) Granit Xhaka | 0 | 0 | 0 | 1 | 1 |
| Totals | | | | 5 | 0 | 3 | 3 | 11 |

=== Disciplinary record ===
As of match played 8 November 2026

Includes all competitive matches. The list is sorted by squad number when disciplinary points / points per card / number of cards are equal. Players with no cards not included in the list.

| Rank | No. | Pos. | Nat. | Name | Premier League | | | FA Cup | | | EFL Cup | | | Europa League | | | Total | | |
| Rank | No. | Pos. | Nat. | Name | Yellow card | Second yellow card | Red card | Yellow card | Second yellow card | Red card | Yellow card | Second yellow card | Red card | Yellow card | Second yellow card | Red card | Yellow card | Second yellow card | Red card |
|---|---|---|---|---|---|---|---|---|---|---|---|---|---|---|---|---|---|---|---|
| 1 | 4 | CB | (Austria) | Kevin Danso | 0 | 0 | 1 | 0 | 0 | 0 | 0 | 0 | 0 | 2 | 0 | 0 | 2 | 0 | 1 |
| 2 | 15 | CB | (Paraguay) | Omar Alderete | 1 | 1 | 0 | 0 | 0 | 0 | 0 | 0 | 0 | 1 | 0 | 0 | 2 | 1 | 0 |
| 3 | 17 | LB | (Mozambique) | Reinildo Mandava | 1 | 1 | 0 | 0 | 0 | 0 | 0 | 0 | 0 | 0 | 0 | 0 | 1 | 1 | 0 |
| 4 | 13 | CB | (England) | Luke O'Nien | 2 | 0 | 0 | 0 | 0 | 0 | 1 | 0 | 0 | 0 | 0 | 0 | 3 | 0 | 0 |
| 4 | 20 | RB | (France) | Nordi Mukiele | 1 | 0 | 0 | 0 | 0 | 0 | 0 | 0 | 0 | 2 | 0 | 0 | 3 | 0 | 0 |
| 4 | 32 | RB | (Northern Ireland) | Trai Hume | 0 | 0 | 0 | 0 | 0 | 0 | 0 | 0 | 0 | 3 | 0 | 0 | 3 | 0 | 0 |
| 4 | 34 | CDM | (Switzerland) | Granit Xhaka | 2 | 0 | 0 | 0 | 0 | 0 | 0 | 0 | 0 | 1 | 0 | 0 | 3 | 0 | 0 |
| 8 | 5 | CB | (Northern Ireland) | Daniel Ballard | 2 | 0 | 0 | 0 | 0 | 0 | 0 | 0 | 0 | 0 | 0 | 0 | 2 | 0 | 0 |
| 8 | 9 | CF | (Netherlands) | Brian Brobbey | 2 | 0 | 0 | 0 | 0 | 0 | 0 | 0 | 0 | 0 | 0 | 0 | 2 | 0 | 0 |
| 8 | 10 | LW | (Ecuador) | Nilson Angulo | 2 | 0 | 0 | 0 | 0 | 0 | 0 | 0 | 0 | 0 | 0 | 0 | 2 | 0 | 0 |
| 8 | 11 | CAM | (England) | Chris Rigg | 1 | 0 | 0 | 0 | 0 | 0 | 1 | 0 | 0 | 0 | 0 | 0 | 2 | 0 | 0 |
| 12 | 6 | LB | (France) | Dayann Methalie | 1 | 0 | 0 | 0 | 0 | 0 | 0 | 0 | 0 | 0 | 0 | 0 | 1 | 0 | 0 |
| 12 | 12 | RB | (Belgium) | Thomas Meunier | 1 | 0 | 0 | 0 | 0 | 0 | 0 | 0 | 0 | 0 | 0 | 0 | 1 | 0 | 0 |
| 12 | 27 | CM | (Democratic Republic of the Congo) | Noah Sadiki | 1 | 0 | 0 | 0 | 0 | 0 | 0 | 0 | 0 | 0 | 0 | 0 | 1 | 0 | 0 |
| 12 | 28 | CM | (France) | Enzo Le Fée | 0 | 0 | 0 | 0 | 0 | 0 | 0 | 0 | 0 | 1 | 0 | 0 | 1 | 0 | 0 |
| 12 | 29 | CDM | (Democratic Republic of the Congo) | Jules Ahoka | 1 | 0 | 0 | 0 | 0 | 0 | 0 | 0 | 0 | 0 | 0 | 0 | 1 | 0 | 0 |
| Total | | | | | 18 | 2 | 1 | 0 | 0 | 0 | 2 | 0 | 0 | 10 | 0 | 0 | 30 | 2 | 1 |

== Awards ==
=== Player awards ===
==== Premier League Goal of the Month ====
| Month | Pos. | Player | Opposition | Result | Ref. |
|---|---|---|---|---|---|
| August | FW | (Ecuador) Nilson Angulo | v. Ipswich Town | Nominated | |
