= Aji Alese =

English footballer (born 2001)

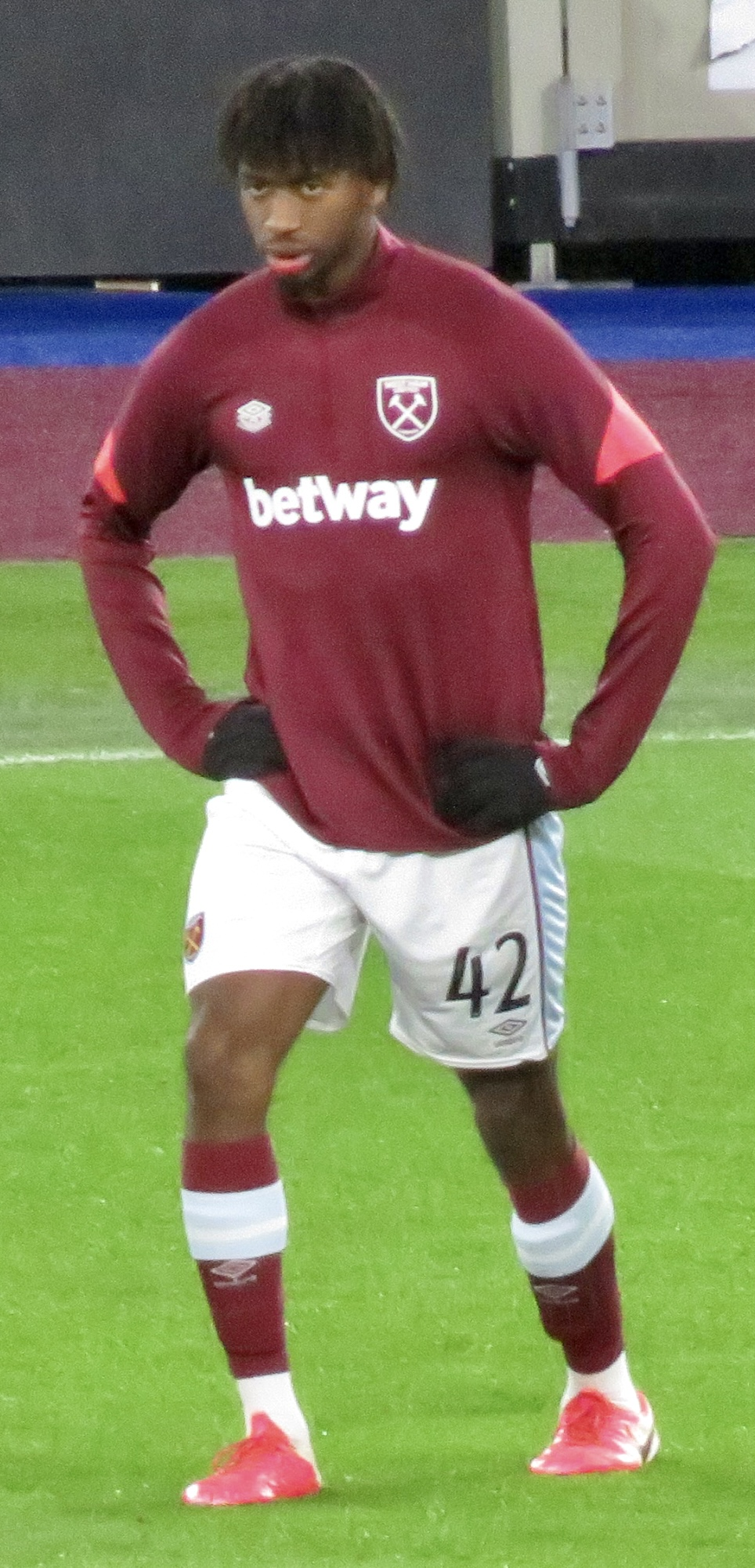
- Alese warming up for West Ham United

Personal information
- Full name: Ajibola Joshua Odunayo Afolarin Alese
- Date of birth: 17 January 2001 (age 25)
- Place of birth: Islington, England
- Height: 1.92 m (6 ft 4 in)
- Position: Central defender

Team information
- Current team: Sunderland
- Number: 42

Youth career
- –2019: West Ham United

Senior career*
Years	Team	Apps	(Gls)
2019–2022	West Ham United	0	(0)
2019–2020	→ Accrington Stanley (loan)	10	(0)
2021	→ Cambridge United (loan)	2	(0)
2022–	Sunderland	40	(1)
2026	→ Portsmouth (loan)	1	(0)

International career^{‡}
2017	England U16	6	(0)
2018	England U17	5	(0)
2018–2019	England U18	5	(0)
2019–2021	England U19	3	(0)
2020–2022	England U20	4	(0)
- * Club domestic league appearances and goals as of 09:51, 8 February 2026 (UTC) ‡ National team caps and goals as of 10:47, 30 March 2022 (UTC)

Ajibola Joshua Odunayo Afolarin Alese (born 17 January 2001) is an English professional footballer who plays as a central defender for Premier League club Sunderland.

A product of West Ham United's academy, he made his professional debut with the club in 2020. Following loan spells at Accrington Stanley and Cambridge United, Alese joined Sunderland in 2022.

Born in England, Alese is eligible to represent England and Nigeria at international level. He has played for England's youth teams from under-16 through under-20 level.

== Club career ==
=== West Ham United ===
Alese began his career with West Ham United, turning professional in July 2018. He moved on loan to Accrington Stanley in September 2019.

Alese made his West Ham debut on 22 September 2020, playing the full 90 minutes of a 5–1 EFL Cup third round victory over Hull City.

On 1 February 2021, Alese moved on loan to Cambridge United. He made only two appearances during his loan as Cambridge won promotion to League One.

=== Sunderland ===
On 15 July 2022, Alese signed a three-year deal with Sunderland for an undisclosed fee. He made his Black Cats debut on 6 August 2022, replacing Jack Clarke in the last few minutes of a 3–2 win against Bristol City. Alese made his first league start on 14 September 2022 against Reading and was booked for time-wasting with nearly 30 minutes of the match still to play. He scored his first Sunderland goal, also his first goal in senior football, on 17 September in a 2–2 away draw against Watford.

In January 2025, Alese broke his leg, and was ruled out for the rest of the season. In the summer he underwent shoulder surgery, and continued rehabilitation for the rest of the year.

In January 2026, Alese moved on loan to Portsmouth.

== International career ==
Born in England, Alese is of Nigerian descent. He has represented the England under-16 team. He was a member of the England under-17 squad that hosted the 2018 UEFA European Under-17 Championship and started in the semi-final defeat against the Netherlands.

Alese has also represented the England under-18 team and on 10 September 2018 played the whole game as England won away against France under-18. In September 2019, Alese was called up to the England under-19 team.

Alese made his U20 debut during a 2–0 victory over Wales at St George's Park on 13 October 2020.

== Style of play ==
Dmitri Halajko, who managed Alese at under-23 level at West Ham, has praised multiple attributes of Alese, saying "he's quick, good on the ball, he has a nice left foot, good range of passing and defends well in one-on-one situations", as well as his leadership skills, a trait former England U19 manager Paul Simpson has echoed. Accrington manager John Coleman has also commended Alese's versatility, saying "he is capable of playing left-back".

== Personal life ==
Born in Islington and raised in Romford, Alese is of Nigerian descent and eligible to play for Nigeria as well as England.

== Career statistics ==
As of match played 7 February 2026

Appearances and goals by club, season and competition
Club	Season	League			FA Cup		EFL Cup		Other		Total	
Club	Season	Division	Apps	Goals	Apps	Goals	Apps	Goals	Apps	Goals	Apps	Goals
West Ham United	2019–20	Premier League	0	0	0	0	0	0	0	0	0	0
West Ham United	2020–21	Premier League	0	0	0	0	1	0	—		1	0
West Ham United	2021–22	Premier League	0	0	0	0	0	0	1 (Note: Appearance in the UEFA Europa League.)	0	1	0
West Ham United	Total		0	0	0	0	1	0	1	0	2	0
Accrington Stanley (loan)	2019–20	League One	10	0	1	0	0	0	4 (Note: Appearances in the EFL Trophy.)	0	15	0
Cambridge United (loan)	2020–21	League Two	2	0	0	0	0	0	0	0	2	0
Sunderland	2022–23	Championship	20	1	2	0	1	0	1 (Note: Appearance in the play-offs.)	0	24	1
Sunderland	2023–24	Championship	8	0	1	0	0	0	—		9	0
Sunderland	2024–25	Championship	12	0	1	0	0	0	—		13	0
Sunderland	2025–26	Premier League	0	0	0	0	0	0	—		0	0
Sunderland	2026–27	Premier League	0	0	0	0	0	0	—		0	0
Sunderland	Total		40	1	4	0	1	0	1	0	46	1
Portsmouth (loan)	2025–26	Championship	1	0	0	0	0	0	0	0	1	0
Career total			53	1	5	0	2	0	6	0	66	1
