= 2023–24 Sunderland A.F.C. season =

English football club season

Sunderland
2023–24 season
- Owner: Kyril Louis-Dreyfus (64%); Juan Sartori (36%)
- Chairman: Kyril Louis-Dreyfus
- Head Coach: Tony Mowbray (until 4 December 2023); Michael Beale (from 18 December 2023 to 19 February 2024); Mike Dodds (from 19 February 2024)
- Stadium: Stadium of Light
- Championship: 16th
- FA Cup: Third round
- EFL Cup: First round
- Top goalscorer: League: Jack Clarke (15); All: Jack Clarke (15)
- Highest home attendance: 44,409 vs Ipswich Town (EFL Championship); 44,814 vs Newcastle United (FA Cup)
- Lowest home attendance: 37,728 vs Huddersfield Town (EFL Championship); 10,763 vs Crewe Alexandra (EFL Cup)
- Average home league attendance: 41,028
Home colours	Away colours	Third colours

The 2023–24 season was the 145th season in the history of Sunderland and their second consecutive season in the Championship. The club also participated in the FA Cup, and the EFL Cup.

== Squad ==
As of 29 March 2024

No.	Player	Position	Nationality	Place of birth	Date of birth (age)	Previous club	Date signed	Fee	Contract end	Apps	Goals
Goalkeepers
1	Anthony Patterson	GK	(England)	North Shields	10 May 2000 (age 26)	Academy	1 July 2018	Trainee	30 June 2028	88	0
30	Nathan Bishop	GK	(England)	Hillingdon	15 October 1999 (age 27)	Manchester United	2 August 2023	Undisclosed	30 June 2026	1	0
52	Adam Richardson	GK	(England)		7 September 2003 (age 23)	Academy	1 July 2022	Trainee	30 June 2026	0	0
Defenders
2	Niall Huggins	RB	(Wales)	York	18 December 2000 (age 25)	Leeds United	20 August 2021	Undisclosed	30 June 2025	17	1
3	Dennis Cirkin	LB	(England)	Dublin	6 April 2002 (age 24)	Tottenham Hotspur	11 August 2021	Undisclosed	30 June 2026	74	5
5	Daniel Ballard	CB	(Northern Ireland)	Stevenage	22 September 1999 (age 27)	Arsenal	1 July 2022	£2,000,000	30 June 2027	33	2
6	Timothée Pembélé	RB	(France)	Beaumont-sur-Oise	9 September 2002 (age 24)	Paris Saint-Germain	2 September 2023	Undisclosed	30 June 2028	0	0
23	Jenson Seelt	CB	(Netherlands)	Ede	23 May 2003 (age 23)	PSV Eindhoven	23 June 2023	Undisclosed	30 June 2028	2	0
32	Trai Hume	RB	(Northern Ireland)	Ballymena	18 March 2002 (age 24)	Linfield	4 January 2022	£200,000	30 June 2027	48	2
33	Leo Hjelde	LB	(Norway)	(England) Nottingham	26 August 2003 (age 23)	Leeds United	30 January 2024	Undisclosed	30 June 2028	0	0
42	Aji Alese	CB	(England)	Islington	17 January 2001 (age 25)	West Ham United	15 July 2022	£500,000	30 June 2027	24	1
44	Ben Crompton	CB	(England)		17 December 2003 (age 22)	Shrewsbury Town	22 July 2022	Free	30 June 2025	1	0
49	Thomas Lavery	RB	(England)		19 December 2005 (age 20)	Academy	24 February 2024	Trainee	30 June 2024	0	0
51	Oliver Bainbridge	LB	(England)		13 June 2005 (age 21)	Academy	1 July 2023	Undisclosed	30 June 2025	0	0
—N/a	Connor Pye	LB	(England)		14 February 2004 (age 22)	Morecambe	12 August 2022	Undisclosed	30 June 2024	0	0
—N/a	Callum Wilson	CB	(Northern Ireland)		29 February 2004 (age 22)	Shrewsbury Town	22 July 2022	Free	30 June 2024	0	0
Midfielders
4	Corry Evans	DM	(Northern Ireland)	Belfast	30 July 1990 (age 36)	Blackburn Rovers	15 July 2021	Free	30 June 2024	64	2
7	Jobe Bellingham	AM	(England)	Stourbridge	23 September 2005 (age 21)	Birmingham City	14 June 2023	Undisclosed	30 June 2028	12	2
8	Elliot Embleton	AM	(England)	Durham	2 April 1999 (age 27)	Academy	1 July 2017	Trainee	30 June 2025	92	11
13	Luke O'Nien	DM	(England)	Hemel Hempstead	21 November 1994 (age 31)	Wycombe Wanderers	30 July 2018	Undisclosed	30 June 2026	232	18
17	Abdoullah Ba	AM	(France)	Saint-Aubin-lès-Elbeuf	31 July 2003 (age 23)	Le Havre	31 August 2022	£850,000	30 June 2027	43	3
22	Adil Aouchiche	AM	(France)	Le Blanc-Mesnil	15 July 2002 (age 24)	Lorient	1 September 2023	Undisclosed	30 June 2028	6	0
24	Dan Neil	CM	(England)	South Shields	30 November 2001 (age 24)	Academy	1 July 2018	Trainee	30 June 2026	116	8
27	Jay Matete	CM	(England)	Lambeth	11 February 2001 (age 25)	Fleetwood Town	31 January 2022	Undisclosed	30 June 2026	25	0
28	Callum Styles	CM	(Hungary)	(England) Bury	27 March 2000 (age 26)	Barnsley	1 February 2024	Loan	31 May 2024	0	0
31	Chris Rigg	AM	(England)	Hebburn	18 June 2007 (age 19)	Academy	1 July 2022	Trainee	30 June 2025	8	2
39	Pierre Ekwah	DM	(France)	Massy	15 January 2002 (age 24)	West Ham United	23 January 2023	Undisclosed	30 June 2027	26	2
46	Bradley Dack	AM	(England)	Greenwich	31 December 1993 (age 32)	Blackburn Rovers	27 July 2023	Free	30 June 2024	5	1
48	Caden Kelly	CM	(England)	Buncrana	20 November 2003 (age 22)	Academy	1 July 2021	Trainee	30 June 2024	2	0
50	Harrison Jones	AM	(England)	Sunderland	25 December 2004 (age 21)	Academy	1 July 2023	Trainee	30 June 2024	0	0
Forwards
9	Luís Semedo	ST	(Portugal)	Lisbon	11 August 2003 (age 23)	Benfica	18 June 2023	Undisclosed	30 June 2028	8	0
10	Patrick Roberts	RW	(England)	Kingston upon Thames	5 February 1997 (age 29)	Manchester City	21 January 2022	Free	30 June 2026	74	7
11	Mason Burstow	ST	(England)	Greenwich	4 August 2003 (age 23)	Chelsea	1 September 2023	Loan	31 May 2024	6	0
14	Romaine Mundle	RW	(England)	London	24 April 2003 (age 23)	(Belgium) Standard Liège	1 February 2024	Undisclosed	30 June 2028	0	0
15	Nazariy Rusyn	ST	(Ukraine)	Novoyavorivsk	25 October 1998 (age 28)	Zorya Luhansk	1 September 2023	Undisclosed	30 June 2027	4	0
18	Ellis Taylor	LW	(England)	Hartlepool	14 April 2003 (age 23)	Academy	1 July 2021	Trainee	30 June 2024	5	0
20	Jack Clarke	LW	(England)	York	23 November 2000 (age 25)	Tottenham Hotspur	9 July 2022	Undisclosed	30 June 2026	82	19
40	Tom Watson	LW	(England)	Easington	8 April 2006 (age 20)	Academy	1 July 2023	Trainee	30 June 2026	1	0
43	Michael Spellman	LW	(England)		21 September 2002 (age 24)	Chester-le-Street United	1 July 2022	Undisclosed	30 June 2024	1	0
76	Timur Tuterov	ST	(Ukraine)	Bakhchysarai	11 June 2005 (age 21)	Kolos Kovalivka	6 April 2023	Free	30 June 2025	0	0
Out on loan
12	Alex Bass	GK	(England)	Eastleigh	1 April 1998 (age 28)	Portsmouth	26 July 2022	Undisclosed	30 June 2025	2	0
12	Eliezer Mayenda	ST	(Spain)	Zaragoza	8 May 2005 (age 21)	Sochaux	28 July 2023	Undisclosed	30 June 2028	0	0
19	Jewison Bennette	LW	(Costa Rica)	Heredia	15 June 2004 (age 22)	Herediano	25 August 2022	£1,000,000	30 June 2026	20	2
25	Nectarios Triantis	CB	(Australia)	Sydney	11 May 2003 (age 23)	Central Coast Mariners	14 June 2023	£300,000	30 June 2027	1	0
41	Zak Johnson	CB	(England)	Sunderland	30 July 2004 (age 22)	Academy	1 July 2022	Trainee	30 June 2026	2	0
45	Joe Anderson	CB	(England)	Stalybridge	6 February 2001 (age 25)	Everton	31 January 2023	Undisclosed	30 June 2026	4	0
45	Matthew Young	GK	(England)		24 November 2006 (age 19)	Academy	1 July 2023	Trainee	30 June 2025	0	0
—N/a	Tom Chiabi	CM	(Zambia)	(England) London	2 May 2003 (age 23)	Middlesbrough	12 August 2022	Undisclosed	30 June 2024	0	0
—N/a	Jack Diamond	LW	(England)	Gateshead	12 January 2000 (age 26)	Academy	1 July 2018	Trainee	30 June 2024	45	2

== Transfers ==
=== In ===
Date	Pos	Player	Transferred from	Fee	Ref
14 June 2023	CB	(Australia) Nectarios Triantis	(Australia) Central Coast Mariners	£300,000	
14 June 2023	AM	(England) Jobe Bellingham	(England) Birmingham City	Undisclosed	
18 June 2023	ST	(Portugal) Luís Semedo	(Portugal) Benfica	Undisclosed	
23 June 2023	CB	(Netherlands) Jenson Seelt	(Netherlands) PSV	Undisclosed	
27 July 2023	AM	(England) Bradley Dack	(England) Blackburn Rovers	Free Transfer	
28 July 2023	ST	(Spain) Eliezer Mayenda	(France) Sochaux	Undisclosed	
2 August 2023	GK	(England) Nathan Bishop	(England) Manchester United	Undisclosed	
1 September 2023	ST	(Ukraine) Nazariy Rusyn	(Ukraine) Zorya Luhansk	Undisclosed	
1 September 2023	RB	(France) Timothée Pembélé	(France) Paris Saint-Germain	Undisclosed	
2 September 2023	AM	(France) Adil Aouchiche	(France) Lorient	Undisclosed	
31 October 2023	GK	(England) Kelechi Chibueze	(England) Leicester City	Free Transfer	
30 January 2024	LB	(Norway) Leo Hjelde	(England) Leeds United	Undisclosed	
1 February 2024	RW	(England) Romaine Mundle	(Belgium) Standard Liège	Undisclosed	
2 February 2024	LW	(Northern Ireland) Rhys Walsh	(Northern Ireland) Glentoran	Undisclosed	

=== Out ===
Date	Pos	Player	Transferred to	Fee	Ref
29 June 2023	CB	(Australia) Bailey Wright	(Singapore) Lion City Sailors	Mutual Consent	
30 June 2023	GK	(England) Harrison Bond	(England) Gateshead	Released	
30 June 2023	DM	(England) Will Cain	(United States) Clemson Tigers	Released	
30 June 2023	GK	(England) Jacob Carney	(Spain) CD Castellón	Released	
30 June 2023	AM	(England) Will Dowling	(England) Stoke City	Released	
30 June 2023	CB	(England) Cameron Jessup	(England) Clacton	Released	
30 June 2023	RB	(England) Ethan Kachosa	(England) Lewes	Released	
30 June 2023	LB	(England) Nathan Newall	(England) Buxton	Released	
30 June 2023	AM	(England) Owen Robinson	(England) Marine	Released	
30 June 2023	RM	(England) Louie Salkeld	(United States) ETSU Buccaneers	Released	
30 June 2023	CM	(England) Thomas Scott	(England) Banbury United	Released	
30 June 2023	CM	(England) Harrison Sohna	(England) Cheltenham Town	Released	
30 June 2023	CB	(England) Ben Williams	(England) Ashington	Released	
30 June 2023	DM	(Northern Ireland) Carl Winchester	(England) Shrewsbury Town	Released	
1 July 2023	SS	(Germany) Leon Dajaku	(Croatia) HNK Hajduk Split	Undisclosed	
5 August 2023	RW	(France) Isaac Lihadji	(Qatar) Al-Duhail	Undisclosed	
1 September 2023	RW	(United States) Lynden Gooch	(England) Stoke City	Undisclosed	
1 September 2023	ST	(Scotland) Ross Stewart	(England) Southampton	Undisclosed	
2 September 2023	CB	(England) Danny Batth	(England) Norwich City	Undisclosed	
9 October 2023	ST	(England) Max Thompson	(Slovakia) MFK Skalica	Mutual Consent	
1 February 2024	AM	(England) Alex Pritchard	(England) Birmingham City	Undisclosed	
1 February 2024	AM	(England) Josh Robertson	(England) Brighton & Hove Albion	Undisclosed	

=== Loaned in ===
Date	Pos	Player	Loaned from	Until	Ref
1 September 2023	ST	(England) Mason Burstow	(England) Chelsea	End of Season	
1 February 2024	CM	(Hungary) Callum Styles	(England) Barnsley	End of Season	

=== Loaned out ===
Date	Pos	Player	Loaned to	Until	Ref
12 July 2023	GK	(England) Alex Bass	(England) AFC Wimbledon	End of Season	
24 July 2023	CB	(England) Joe Anderson	(England) Shrewsbury Town	End of Season	
1 September 2023	AM	(England) Elliot Embleton	(England) Derby County	10 January 2024 (Note: On 10 January, Embleton was recalled early from his loan spell at Derby.)	
22 September 2023	CB	(England) Zak Johnson	(England) Hartlepool United	1 January 2024 (Note: On 26 October, Johnson's loan at Hartlepool was extended until January.)	
5 January 2024	ST	(England) Harry Gardiner	(England) Blyth Spartans	End of Season (Note: On 20 February, Gardiner's loan at Blyth was extended until the end of season.)	
22 January 2024	GK	(England) Kelechi Chibueze	(England) Consett	19 February 2024	
25 January 2024	LW	(England) Jack Diamond	(England) Carlisle United	End of Season	
30 January 2024	LW	(Costa Rica) Jewison Bennette	(Greece) Aris Thessaloniki	End of Season	
1 February 2024	CM	(England) Jay Matete	(England) Oxford United	27 March 2024 (Note: On 27 March, Matete returned from his loan at Oxford early due to a knee injury.)	
1 February 2024	ST	(Spain) Eliezer Mayenda	(Scotland) Hibernian	End of Season	
1 February 2024	CB	(Australia) Nectarios Triantis	(Scotland) Hibernian	End of Season	
14 February 2024	CB	(England) Zak Johnson	(Republic of Ireland) Dundalk	End of Season	
16 February 2024	GK	(England) Matthew Young	(England) Darlington	End of Season (Note: On 19 March, Young's loan at Darlington was extended until the end of season.)	
15 March 2024	GK	(England) Kelechi Chibueze	(England) Consett	End of Season	
29 March 2024	CM	(Zambia) Tom Chiabi	(England) Carshalton Athletic	End of Season	

== Pre-season and friendlies ==
Win Draw Loss Fixtures

On 20 February 2023, Sunderland announced a tour of the United States as part of their pre-season preparations, with friendlies against lower-league sides San Antonio FC and New Mexico United. A third and final stateside friendly was announced a few days later, against North Carolina. On May 18, the club confirmed a further two friendlies, against local sides Gateshead and South Shields. In June, a sixth pre-season opposition was added, with a trip to Hartlepool United planned. A home friendly against RCD Mallorca was also announced.

8 July 2023 Friendly	South Shields	3–4	Sunderland	Jarrow
12:30 BST	Blackett 26', 56'; Morse 80'	Report	Semedo 48'; Clarke 61', 73'; Rigg 89'	Stadium: 1st Cloud Arena

8 July 2023 Friendly	Gateshead	2–3	Sunderland	Gateshead
16:00 BST	Pani 20'; Campbell 23'	Report	Neil 39'; Huggins 64'; Spellman 82'	Stadium: Gateshead International Stadium

15 July 2023 Friendly	San Antonio FC	1–3	Sunderland	San Antonio, United States
20:00 CST	PC 25'	Report	Rigg 16'; Semedo 45'; Bennette 90'	Stadium: Toyota Field; Attendance: 8,328

19 July 2023 Friendly	New Mexico United	2–3	Sunderland	Albuquerque, United States
19:00 MST	Garvanian 88'; Zuleta 90+6' (pen.)	Report	Ekwah 39'; Semedo 45+3'; Lihadji 67'	Stadium: Rio Grande Credit Union Field at Isotopes Park

21 July 2023 Friendly	North Carolina	2–4	Sunderland	Cary, United States
19:00 EST	Mentzingen 52'; Perez 59'	Report	Matete 4'; Batth 15'; Roberts 44'; Clarke 45+2'	Stadium: WakeMed Soccer Park

29 July 2023 Friendly	Sunderland	1–1	RCD Mallorca	Sunderland
15:00 BST	Semedo 3'	Report	Muriqi 47'	Stadium: Stadium of Light

1 August 2023 Friendly	Hartlepool United	5–2	Sunderland	Hartlepool
19:00 BST	Wreh 3'; Mancini 22', 23'; Dieseruvwe 74'; Grey 78'	Report	Pritchard 13'; Bennette 64'	Stadium: Suit Direct Stadium; Attendance: 2,832 (away fans)

== Competitions ==
=== Overall record ===
Competition	Starting round	Final position	Record							
Competition	Starting round	Final position	Pld	W	D	L	GF	GA	GD	Win %
Championship	Matchday 1		45	16	8	21	52	52	+0	35.56
FA Cup	Third round	Third round	1	0	0	1	0	3	−3	0.00
EFL Cup	First round	First round	1	0	1	0	1	1	+0	0.00
Total			47	16	9	22	53	56	−3	34.04

Last updated: 27 April 2024
Source: Soccerway

=== Championship ===
==== League table ====
Pos	Team	Pld	W	D	L	GF	GA	GD	Pts
13	Millwall	46	16	11	19	45	55	−10	59
14	Swansea City	46	15	12	19	59	65	−6	57
15	Watford	46	13	17	16	61	61	0	56
16	Sunderland	46	16	8	22	52	54	−2	56
17	Stoke City	46	15	11	20	49	60	−11	56
18	Queens Park Rangers	46	15	11	20	47	58	−11	56
19	Blackburn Rovers	46	14	11	21	60	74	−14	53

Source: EFL official website
Rules for classification: 1) Points; 2) Goal difference; 3) Number of goals scored; 4) Head-to-head results; 5) Wins; 6) Away goals; 7) Penalty points (sec 9.5); 8) Number of 12-point sending off offences; 9) Play-off (only if needed to determine promotion/relegation)

==== Results summary ====
Overall								Home						Away					
Pld	W	D	L	GF	GA	GD	Pts	W	D	L	GF	GA	GD	W	D	L	GF	GA	GD
46	16	8	22	52	54	−2	56	10	2	11	30	30	0	6	6	11	22	24	−2

Last updated: 20 April 2024.
Source: Soccerway

==== Results by round ====
Round	1	2	3	4	5	6	7	8	9	10	11	12	13	14	15	16	17	18	19	20	21	22	23	24	25	26	27	28	29	30	31	32	33	34	35	36	37	38	39	40	41	42	43	44	45	46
Ground	H	A	H	A	H	A	A	H	A	H	H	A	A	H	A	H	A	H	A	H	H	A	H	A	A	H	A	H	H	A	H	A	A	H	A	H	A	H	A	H	H	A	A	H	A	H
Result	L	L	W	D	W	W	W	L	W	W	L	L	L	W	D	W	L	L	D	W	W	L	L	W	D	W	L	L	W	D	W	L	L	L	L	L	L	D	W	L	D	D	W	L	L	L
Position	20	21	15	18	9	7	4	5	4	4	4	6	10	8	8	6	9	11	9	6	6	6	9	6	7	6	7	8	7	8	7	10	10	10	10	11	12	12	13	13	13	13	13	13	15	16
Points	0	0	3	4	7	10	13	13	16	19	19	19	19	22	23	26	26	26	27	30	33	33	33	36	37	40	40	40	43	44	47	47	47	47	47	47	47	48	51	51	52	53	56	56	56	56

Updated to match(es) played on 20 April 2024. Source: Soccerway
A = Away; H = Home; W = Win; D = Draw; L = Loss

==== Matches ====
On 22 June, the EFL Championship fixtures were released.

Win Draw Loss Fixtures

6 August 2023 1	Sunderland	1–2	Ipswich Town	Sunderland
17:00 BST	Hume (yellow card) 32' (yellow-red card) 72'; Ballard (yellow card) 80'; Neil 86'	Report	Burns (yellow card) 35'; Broadhead 45+1'; Hirst 53'; Hladký (yellow card) 56'; Morsy (yellow card) 62'	Stadium: Stadium of Light; Attendance: 44,409 (1,995 away); Referee: Sam Barrott
Note: Live on Sky Sports

12 August 2023 2	Preston North End	2–1	Sunderland	Preston
15:00 BST	Keane 25' (yellow card) 35'; Frøkjær-Jensen 59'; Browne (yellow card) 90+4'; Potts (yellow card) 90+5'	Report	Clarke 31' (pen.); Ballard (yellow card) 69'	Stadium: Deepdale; Attendance: 19,892 (5,706 away); Referee: James Linington

19 August 2023 3	Sunderland	2–1	Rotherham United	Sunderland
15:00 BST	Cirkin (yellow card) 10'; Bellingham 22', 52' (yellow card) 69'	Report	Odoffin 20'; Bramall (yellow card) 33'	Stadium: Stadium of Light; Attendance: 40,688 (814 away); Referee: Gavin Ward

26 August 2023 4	Coventry City	0–0	Sunderland	Coventry
15:00 BST	Palmer (yellow card) 21'	Report	Ekwah (yellow card) 10'; O'Nien (yellow card) 14'; Cirkin (yellow card) 65'; Pritchard (yellow card) 90+5'	Stadium: Coventry Building Society Arena; Attendance: 25,714 (2,785 away); Referee: Keith Stroud

2 September 2023 5	Sunderland	5–0	Southampton	Sunderland
12:30 BST	Clarke 1'; Ekwah 7', 45'; Ba (yellow card) 39'; O'Nien (yellow card) 42'; Dack 48'; Rigg 90+5'	Report	Mara (yellow card) 35'; Adams (yellow card) 69'	Stadium: Stadium of Light; Attendance: 41,459 (1,541 away); Referee: David Coote

16 September 2023 6	Queens Park Rangers	1–3	Sunderland	Shepherd's Bush
15:00 BST	Paal 12'; Colback (red card) 21'; Armstrong (yellow card) 33'; Kakay (yellow card) 79'	Report	Clarke 45+8'; Ballard 57'; Ba 81'	Stadium: Loftus Road Stadium; Attendance: 16,383 (3,014 away); Referee: Dean Whitestone

20 September 2023 7	Blackburn Rovers	1–3	Sunderland	Blackburn
19:45 BST	Travis (yellow card) 31'; Leonard 35', (yellow card) 50'; Wharton (yellow card) 45+3'; Garrett (yellow card) 77'; Rankin-Costello (yellow card) 90+6'	Report	Clarke 28' (pen.), 78'; Neil 45+1'; Pritchard (yellow card) 71'; Ba (yellow card) 86'; Ballard (yellow card) 90+7'	Stadium: Ewood Park; Attendance: 15,621 (3,825 away); Referee: John Busby

24 September 2023 8	Sunderland	0–1	Cardiff City	Sunderland
15:00 BST	Ba (yellow card) 9'; Burstow (yellow card) 58'	Report	Siopis (yellow card) 55'; Colwill (yellow card) 77'; McGuinness 87'	Stadium: Stadium of Light; Attendance: 41,581 (384 away); Referee: Steve Martin

29 September 2023 9	Sheffield Wednesday	0–3	Sunderland	Owlerton
20:00 BST	Diaby (yellow card) 62'; Delgado (yellow card) 83'	Report	Ballard 5'; Clarke 8', 31' (pen.)	Stadium: Hillsborough Stadium; Attendance: 25,987 (3,886 away); Referee: Sam Barrott

4 October 2023 10	Sunderland	2–0	Watford	Sunderland
19:45 BST	Huggins 43'; Burstow (yellow card) 50'; Ba 62'	Report	Ngakia (yellow card) 27'; Dele-Bashiru (yellow card) 58'; Bachmann (yellow card) 74'; Louza (yellow card) 74'; Porteous (yellow card) 83'; Andrews (red card) 86'	Stadium: Stadium of Light; Attendance: 38,120 (142 away); Referee: Andy Davies

7 October 2023 11	Sunderland	0–4	Middlesbrough	Sunderland
12:30 BST	Neil (yellow card) 17' (yellow-red card) 45+4'; Roberts (yellow card) 70'; Clarke (yellow card) 73'	Report	Jones (yellow card) 32', (goal) 72'; Greenwood 58'; Crooks 60'; Forss 90'	Stadium: Stadium of Light; Attendance: 43,584 (2,085 away); Referee: Jarred Gillett

21 October 2023 12	Stoke City	2–1	Sunderland	Stoke-on-Trent
15:00 BST	Mmaee 7'; Johnson (yellow card) 21'; McNally 47'; Burger (yellow card) 50'; Pearson (yellow card) 59'; Thompson (yellow card) 73'; Stevens (yellow card) 86'	Report	Clarke 10' (yellow card) 64'; Huggins (yellow card) 25'; Hume (yellow card) 34'; Aouchiche (yellow card) 90+4'	Stadium: Bet365 Stadium; Attendance: 25,512 (2,604 away); Referee: Graham Scott

24 October 2023 13	Leicester City	1–0	Sunderland	Leicester
20:00 BST	Justin 12' (yellow card) 67'; Iheanacho (yellow card) 40'; Vestergaard (yellow card) 50'; Pereira (yellow card) 72'	Report	O'Nien (yellow card) 50'; Hume (yellow card) 54'; Cirkin (yellow card) 71'	Stadium: King Power Stadium; Attendance: 30,951 (3,300 away); Referee: Keith Stroud

28 October 2023 14	Sunderland	3–1	Norwich City	Sunderland
15:00 BST	Ekwah (yellow card) 24'; Hume 37'; O'Nien (yellow card) 41'; Neil 45'; Clarke 80' (pen.); Pritchard (yellow card) 89'; Semedo (yellow card) 90+5'	Report	Fassnach (yellow card) 11'; Hwang 23'; Giannoulis (yellow card) 61'; McLean (yellow card) 78'; Idah (yellow card) 90+5'	Stadium: Stadium of Light; Attendance: 39,871 (1,083 away); Referee: Anthony Backhouse

4 November 2023 15	Swansea City	0–0	Sunderland	Landore
15:00 GMT	Patino (yellow card) 10' (yellow-red card) 30'; Lowe (penalty missed) 45+2'; Fulton (yellow card) 50'; Darling (yellow card) 80'	Report	Rusyn (yellow card) 20'; Ballard (yellow card) 52'; O'Nien (yellow card) 90+3'	Stadium: Swansea.com Stadium; Attendance: 16,974 (1,791 away); Referee: Bobby Madley

11 November 2023 16	Sunderland	3–1	Birmingham City	Sunderland
12:30 GMT	Bellingham 17'; Roberts (yellow card) 39'; Hume (yellow card) 45+5'; Sanderson 57' (o.g.); Aouchiche 76'	Report	Laird (yellow card) 18'; Miyoshi 30'; James (yellow card) 46'	Stadium: Stadium of Light; Attendance: 40,922 (1,204 away); Referee: Dean Whitestone

25 November 2023 17	Plymouth Argyle	2–0	Sunderland	Plymouth
15:00 GMT	Whittaker 24'; Cundle (yellow card) 26'; Azaz 40'; Kesler-Hayden (yellow card) 85'; Randell (yellow card) 90+1'; Mumba (yellow card) 90+2'	Report	O'Nien (yellow card) 85'	Stadium: Home Park; Attendance: 16,457 (1,632 away); Referee: James Bell

29 November 2023 18	Sunderland	1–2	Huddersfield Town	Sunderland
19:45 GMT	Aouchiche (yellow card) 31'; O'Nien 40'; Clarke (yellow card) 90+5'	Report	Helik 28'; Lees (yellow card) 39'; Burgzorg 67'	Stadium: Stadium of Light; Attendance: 37,728 (238 away); Referee: Matt Donohue

2 December 2023 19	Millwall	1–1	Sunderland	Millwall
15:00 GMT	Nisbet 44'; Saville (yellow card) 67'; Białkowski (yellow card) 75'; Cooper (yellow card) 78'; Bradshaw (yellow card) 81'; Watmore (yellow card) 90+4'	Report	Burstow (yellow card) 25'; Clarke (yellow card) 32', (goal) 78' (pen.); Ballard (yellow card) 45'	Stadium: The Den; Attendance: 17,815 (3,005 away); Referee: James Linington

9 December 2023 20	Sunderland	2–1	West Bromwich Albion	Sunderland
12:30 GMT	Ballard (yellow card) 34' (goal) 69'; Neil 84'	Report	Sarmiento (yellow card) 51'; Molumby (yellow card) 54'; Chalobah (yellow card) 81'; Thomas-Asante 86' (yellow card) 90'; Furlong (yellow card) 90+3'; Pipa (yellow card) 90+6'	Stadium: The Stadium of Light; Attendance: 40,101 (782 away); Referee: Darren Bond

12 December 2023 21	Sunderland	1–0	Leeds United	Sunderland
20:00 GMT	O'Nien (yellow card) 40'; Bellingham 78'	Report	Gray (yellow card) 28'; Ampadu (yellow card) 64'; James (yellow card) 70'	Stadium: The Stadium of Light; Attendance: 40,531 (1,995 away); Referee: Dean Whitestone

16 December 2023 22	Bristol City	1–0	Sunderland	Bristol
15:00 GMT	Conway (yellow card) 1' (goal) 20' (pen.); Dickie (yellow card) 35'; Williams (yellow card) 70'	Report	Bellingham (yellow card) 69'; Roberts (yellow card) 85'; Ballard (yellow card) 90+4'	Stadium: Ashton Gate; Attendance: 22,701 (2,698 away); Referee: Steve Martin

23 December 2023 23	Sunderland	0–3	Coventry City	Sunderland
15:00 GMT	Hume (yellow card) 26'; O'Nien (yellow card) 45+4'; Neil (yellow card) 88'	Report	Sakamoto 45+1'; Collins (yellow card) 54'; Bidwell (yellow card) 64'; O'Hare 67'; Palmer 70'	Stadium: The Stadium of Light; Attendance: 41,216 (1,074 away); Referee: Matt Donohue

26 December 2023 24	Hull City	0–1	Sunderland	Kingston upon Hull
15:00 GMT	Delap (yellow card) 88'	Report	Clarke 82'; Triantis (yellow card) 90+4'	Stadium: MKM Stadium; Attendance: 24,420 (2,150 away); Referee: Sunny Gill

29 December 2023 25	Rotherham United	1–1	Sunderland	Rotherham
19:45 GMT	Clucas 48'; Nombe (yellow card) 65'; Cafú (yellow card) 90+4'	Report	Bellingham (yellow card) 40'; Clarke 73'	Stadium: AESSEAL New York Stadium; Attendance: 11,323 (2,420 away); Referee: Tony Harrington

1 January 2024 26	Sunderland	2–0	Preston North End	Sunderland
12:30 GMT	Pritchard 10'; Rusyn 44'	Report	Lindsay (yellow card) 39'	Stadium: The Stadium of Light; Attendance: 42,714 (670 away); Referee: Oliver Langford

13 January 2024 27	Ipswich Town	2–1	Sunderland	Ipswich
17:30 GMT	Clarke (yellow card) 24'; Jackson 33'; Taylor (yellow card) 52'; Edmundson (yellow card) 54'; Burns (yellow card) 60'; Chaplin 75'; Sarmiento (yellow card) 85'	Report	Clarke 26'; Ba (yellow card) 55'; Hume (yellow card) 83'	Stadium: Portman Road; Attendance: 29,291 (1,987 away); Referee: Sam Allison
Note: Fixture was originally scheduled for a 15:00 kick-off time, but was moved for TV coverage.

19 January 2024 28	Sunderland	0–1	Hull City	Sunderland
20:00 GMT	Ekwah (yellow card) 48'; Clarke (yellow card) 90+4'	Report	Tufan (yellow card) 17'; Docherty (yellow card) 30'; Coyle (yellow card) 32'; Morton (yellow card) 40'; Slater (yellow card) 43'; Carvalho 71'; Allsop (yellow card) 83'; Jacob (yellow card) 89'	Stadium: The Stadium of Light; Attendance: 40,219 (850 away); Referee: Robert Jones
Note: Fixture was originally scheduled for 20 January, but was moved for TV coverage.

27 January 2024 29	Sunderland	3–1	Stoke City	Sunderland
15:00 GMT	Burstow 43'; Ba 49'; Ekwah 70'; Ballard (yellow card) 90+1'	Report	Wilmot (yellow card) 26'; Cundle (yellow card) 32'; Thompson (yellow card) 39'; Seelt 74' (o.g.)	Stadium: Stadium of Light; Attendance: 41,394 (1,487 away); Referee: Andy Davies

4 February 2024 30	Middlesbrough	1–1	Sunderland	Middlesbrough
12:00 GMT	Engel (yellow card) 34'; Forss 61'; Greenwood (yellow card) 75'; Ayling (yellow card) 79'	Report	Hume (yellow card) 14'; Ba (yellow card) 34'; Rusyn 83'; Ekwah (yellow card) 90+2'	Stadium: Riverside Stadium; Attendance: 31,716 (2,000 away); Referee: Darren England
Note: Fixture was initially scheduled for 3 February, but was moved for live Sky Sports coverage.

10 February 2024 31	Sunderland	3–1	Plymouth Argyle	Sunderland
15:00 GMT	Ba (yellow card) 10'; Ekwah 52'; Clarke 59'; Bellingham 67'	Report	Whittaker (yellow card) 24'; Phillips (yellow card) 33'; Hardie 39'; Mumba (yellow card) 44'; Gyabi (yellow card) 69'; Sorinola (yellow card) 87'	Stadium: Stadium of Light; Attendance: 41,269 (1,200 away); Referee: Anthony Backhouse

14 February 2024 32	Huddersfield Town	1–0	Sunderland	Huddersfield
19:45 GMT	Pearson 37'; Matos (yellow card) 68'; Nicholls (yellow card) 80'	Report	O'Nien (yellow card) 35'; Ba (yellow card) 50'; Mundle (yellow card) 86'; Patterson (yellow card) 90+6'	Stadium: John Smith's Stadium; Attendance: 19,550 (2,400 away); Referee: Gavin Ward

17 February 2024 33	Birmingham City	2–1	Sunderland	Bordesley
15:00 GMT	Paik (yellow card) 32'; James 60', (yellow card) 77'; Laird (yellow card) 62'; Bielik (yellow card) 72'; Miyoshi 80'	Report	Bellingham (yellow card) 16'; Clarke 22'; Ballard (yellow card) 56'; Ba (yellow card) 73'; Hume (yellow card) 82'	Stadium: St Andrew's Stadium; Attendance: 27,449 (2,300 away); Referee: Steve Martin

24 February 2024 34	Sunderland	1–2	Swansea City	Sunderland
15:00 GMT	Hume (yellow card) 45+4'; O'Nien 77'	Report	Ronald 19', 28'; Cabango (yellow card) 45+5'; Paterson (yellow card) 45+5'; Darling (yellow card) 90+2'; Tymon (yellow card) 90+4'	Stadium: Stadium of Light; Attendance: 41,777 (358 away); Referee: Keith Stroud

2 March 2024 35	Norwich City	1–0	Sunderland	Norwich
15:00 GMT	Giannoulis (yellow card) 76'; Sargent 81'; Sørensen (yellow card) 90'	Report	Hume (yellow card) 43'; Ekwah (yellow card) 59'; Seelt (yellow card) 90+5'	Stadium: Carrow Road; Attendance: 26,668 (2,023 away); Referee: Thomas Kirk

5 March 2024 36	Sunderland	0–1	Leicester City	Sunderland
19:45 GMT	O'Nien (yellow card) 55'	Report	Vardy 13'; Hermansen (yellow card) 68'; Dewsbury-Hall (yellow card) 81'; Ndidi (yellow card) 90'	Stadium: Stadium of Light; Attendance: 40,293 (1,200 away); Referee: Sunny Sukhvir Gill

9 March 2024 37	Southampton	4–2	Sunderland	Southampton
15:00 GMT	Armstrong 9'; Armstrong 37' (pen.); Rothwell 77', 80' (yellow card) 90+6'; Aribo (yellow card) 90'	Report	Seelt (yellow card) 8'; Ballard (yellow card) 31'; Mundle 62'; Hjelde (yellow card) 64'; Bellingham 71'	Stadium: St Mary's Stadium; Attendance: 30,869 (2,021 away); Referee: Stuart Attwell

16 March 2024 38	Sunderland	0–0	Queens Park Rangers	Sunderland
15:00 GMT	Hume (yellow card) 73'	Report	Dunne (yellow card) 45'; Willock (yellow card) 87'	Stadium: Stadium of Light; Attendance: 41,478 (1,101 away); Referee: Oliver Langford

29 March 2024 39	Cardiff City	0–2	Sunderland	Leckwith
15:00 GMT	Wintle (yellow card) 64'; Bowler (yellow card) 64'	Report	Aouchiche 12'; Bellingham 27'; Styles (yellow card) 36'	Stadium: Cardiff City Stadium; Attendance: 22,141 (2,400 away); Referee: Jeremy Simpson

1 April 2024 40	Sunderland	1–5	Blackburn Rovers	Sunderland
15:00 BST	Rigg 77'	Report	Szmodics 29', 36'; Hedges 47'; Dolan 54'; Moran 81'	Stadium: Stadium of Light; Attendance: 42,019 (1,100 away); Referee: John Busby

6 April 2024 41	Sunderland	0–0	Bristol City	Sunderland
15:00 BST	Hume (yellow card) 62'	Report	Roberts (yellow card) 70'	Stadium: Stadium of Light; Attendance: Leigh Doughty; Referee: 40,298 (742 away)

9 April 2024 42	Leeds United	0–0	Sunderland	Leeds
20:00 BST	Firpo (yellow card) 70'	Report	Ballard (yellow card) 21'; O'Nien (yellow card) 46'; Rigg (yellow card) 57'; Bellingham (yellow card) 62'	Stadium: Elland Road; Attendance: 36,793 (2,987 away); Referee: Tim Robinson
Note: Fixture was initially scheduled to kick-off at 19:45, but was moved for live Sky Sports broadcast.

13 April 2024 43	West Bromwich Albion	0–1	Sunderland	West Bromwich
15:00 BST	Thomas-Asante (yellow card) 42' (yellow-red card) 43'; Furlong (yellow card) 63'; Wallace (yellow card) 68'; Kipre (yellow card) 86'	Report	Hume (yellow card) 31'; Ekwah 45+2'; Alese (yellow card) 80'; Styles (yellow card) 85'	Stadium: The Hawthorns; Attendance: 25,366 (2,009 away); Referee: Matt Donohue

20 April 2024 44	Sunderland	0–1	Millwall	Sunderland
15:00 BST	Clarke (yellow card) 12'; Ballard (yellow card) 87'; Bellingham (yellow card) 90+1'	Report	Obafemi (yellow card) 43'; Watmore 71'; Flemming (yellow card) 87'	Stadium: Stadium of Light; Attendance: 40,743; Referee: Anthony Backhouse

27 April 2024 45	Watford	1–0	Sunderland	Watford
15:00 BST	Kayembe (yellow card) 10'; Andrews 64'; Lewis (yellow card) 86'	Report	O'Nien (yellow card) 58'	Stadium: Vicarage Road; Attendance: 20,712; Referee: Oliver Langford

4 May 2024 46	Sunderland	0–2	Sheffield Wednesday	Sunderland
12:30 BST	Alese (yellow card) 49'		Palmer 29' (yellow card) 78'; Windass 38'	Stadium: Stadium of Light; Attendance: 44,222; Referee: Gavin Ward

=== FA Cup ===
Sunderland entered the competition in the third round, as a Championship side, and were drawn at home to arch-rivals Newcastle United, being the first Tyne-Wear derby since 2016.

Win Draw Loss Fixtures

6 January 2024 Third round	Sunderland	0–3	Newcastle United	Sunderland
12:45 GMT	Hume (yellow card) 39'; Pritchard (yellow card) 61'; O'Nien (yellow card) 78'; Ballard (yellow card) 88'	Report	Ballard 35' (o.g.); Isak 46', 90' (pen.); Gordon (yellow card) 66'; Guimarães (yellow card) 72'	Stadium: Stadium of Light; Attendance: 44,814; Referee: Craig Pawson

=== EFL Cup ===
Sunderland were drawn at home against Crewe Alexandra in the first round.

Win Draw Loss Fixtures

8 August 2023 First round	Sunderland	1–1 (3–5 p)	Crewe Alexandra	Sunderland
19:45 BST	Batth (yellow card) 16'; Bennette (yellow card) 31'; Pritchard (yellow card) 33'; Ba (yellow card) 50'; Rigg 64'	Report	Powell (yellow card) 13'; Offord 45+1' (yellow card) 89'; Holíček (yellow card) 83'; Lunt (yellow card) 84'	Stadium: Stadium of Light; Attendance: 10,763; Referee: Scott Oldham
	Penalties
	Dack (penalty scored); Pritchard (penalty scored); Ekwah (penalty missed); Triantis (penalty scored)		(penalty scored) Nevitt; (penalty scored) Long; (penalty scored) Adebisi; (penalty scored) Tabiner; (penalty scored) Cooney

== Player statistics ==
=== Appearance summary ===
As of match(es) played on 26 December 2023

No.	Pos	Nat	Player	Total		Championship		FA Cup		EFL Cup	
No.	Pos	Nat	Player	Apps	Goals	Apps	Goals	Apps	Goals	Apps	Goals
Goalkeepers
1	GK	(England) ENG	Anthony Patterson	24	0	24+0	0	0+0	0	0+0	0
30	GK	(England) ENG	Nathan Bishop	1	0	0+0	0	0+0	0	1+0	0
Defenders
2	DF	(Wales) WAL	Niall Huggins	20	1	17+2	1	0+0	0	1+0	0
3	DF	(England) ENG	Dennis Cirkin	8	0	5+3	0	0+0	0	0+0	0
5	DF	(Northern Ireland) NIR	Daniel Ballard	23	3	23+0	3	0+0	0	0+0	0
6	DF	(England) ENG	Danny Batth	1	0	0+0	0	0+0	0	1+0	0
23	DF	(Netherlands) NED	Jenson Seelt	7	0	4+3	0	0+0	0	0+0	0
25	DF	(Australia) AUS	Nectarios Triantis	3	0	1+1	0	0+0	0	1+0	0
32	DF	(Northern Ireland) NIR	Trai Hume	24	1	24+0	1	0+0	0	0+0	0
41	DF	(England) ENG	Zak Johnson	1	0	0+0	0	0+0	0	1+0	0
44	DF	(England) ENG	Ben Crompton	1	0	0+0	0	0+0	0	0+1	0
Midfielders
7	MF	(England) ENG	Jobe Bellingham	24	4	22+1	4	0+0	0	0+1	0
10	MF	(England) ENG	Patrick Roberts	22	0	17+5	0	0+0	0	0+0	0
11	MF	(United States) USA	Lynden Gooch	2	0	0+2	0	0+0	0	0+0	0
13	MF	(England) ENG	Luke O'Nien	23	1	23+0	1	0+0	0	0+0	0
17	MF	(France) FRA	Abdoullah Ba	22	2	13+8	2	0+0	0	1+0	0
18	MF	(England) ENG	Ellis Taylor	1	0	0+0	0	0+0	0	1+0	0
19	MF	(Costa Rica) CRC	Jewison Bennette	2	0	0+1	0	0+0	0	1+0	0
20	MF	(England) ENG	Jack Clarke	25	11	24+0	11	0+0	0	0+1	0
21	MF	(England) ENG	Alex Pritchard	16	0	2+13	0	0+0	0	1+0	0
22	MF	(France) FRA	Adil Aouchiche	14	1	3+11	1	0+0	0	0+0	0
24	MF	(England) ENG	Dan Neil	24	4	23+0	4	0+0	0	1+0	0
31	MF	(England) ENG	Chris Rigg	7	2	0+6	1	0+0	0	1+0	1
39	MF	(France) FRA	Pierre Ekwah	19	2	17+1	2	0+0	0	0+1	0
46	MF	(England) ENG	Bradley Dack	13	1	6+6	1	0+0	0	0+1	0
Forwards
9	FW	(Portugal) POR	Luis Semedo	13	0	1+12	0	0+0	0	0+0	0
11	FW	(England) ENG	Mason Burstow	11	0	8+3	0	0+0	0	0+0	0
12	FW	(Spain) ESP	Eliezer Mayenda	6	0	1+5	0	0+0	0	0+0	0
15	FW	(Ukraine) UKR	Nazariy Rusyn	9	0	4+5	0	0+0	0	0+0	0

=== Goals record ===
As of match(es) played on 29 December 2023

Rank	No.	Nat.	Po.	Name	Championship	FA Cup	EFL Cup	Total
1	20	(England)	LW	Jack Clarke	12	0	0	12
2	7	(England)	AM	Jobe Bellingham	4	0	0	4
2	24	(England)	CM	Dan Neil	4	0	0	4
3	5	(Northern Ireland)	CB	Daniel Ballard	3	0	0	3
4	17	(France)	AM	Abdoullah Ba	2	0	0	2
4	31	(England)	AM	Chris Rigg	1	0	1	2
4	39	(France)	CM	Pierre Ekwah	2	0	0	2
5	2	(Wales)	RB	Niall Huggins	1	0	0	1
5	13	(England)	CM	Luke O'Nien	1	0	0	1
5	22	(France)	AM	Adil Aouchiche	1	0	0	1
5	32	(Northern Ireland)	RB	Trai Hume	1	0	0	1
5	46	(England)	AM	Bradley Dack	1	0	0	1
Total					33	0	1	34

=== Penalties record ===
As of match(es) played on 15 December 2023

Excludes penalties taken during Penalty shoot-outs.

Rank	No.	Nat.	Po.	Name	Championship		FA Cup		EFL Cup		Total		Conversion Ratio
Rank	No.	Nat.	Po.	Name	Scored	Missed	Scored	Missed	Scored	Missed	Scored	Missed	Conversion Ratio
1	20	(England)	LW	Jack Clarke	5	0	0	0	0	0	5	0	100%
Total					5	0	0	0	0	0	5	0	100%

=== Assists record ===
As of match(es) played on 26 December 2023

Rank	No.	Nat.	Po.	Name	Championship	FA Cup	EFL Cup	Total
1	21	(England)	AM	Alex Pritchard	5	0	0	5
2	24	(England)	CM	Dan Neil	3	0	0	3
3	2	(Wales)	RB	Niall Huggins	1	0	0	1
3	3	(England)	LB	Dennis Cirkin	1	0	0	1
3	7	(England)	AM	Jobe Bellingham	1	0	0	1
3	10	(England)	AM	Patrick Roberts	1	0	0	1
3	11	(England)	ST	Mason Burstow	1	0	0	1
3	15	(Ukraine)	ST	Nazariy Rusyn	1	0	0	1
3	17	(France)	AM	Abdoullah Ba	1	0	0	1
3	19	(Costa Rica)	AM	Jewison Bennette	1	0	0	1
3	20	(England)	AM	Jack Clarke	1	0	0	1
3	22	(France)	AM	Adil Aouchiche	1	0	0	1
3	23	(Netherlands)	CB	Jenson Seelt	1	0	0	1
3	32	(Northern Ireland)	RB	Trai Hume	1	0	0	1
3	46	(England)	AM	Bradley Dack	1	0	0	1
Total					20	0	0	20

=== Disciplinary record ===
As of match(es) played on 26 December 2023

Rank	No.	Nat.	Po.	Name	Championship			FA Cup			EFL Cup			Total		
Rank	No.	Nat.	Po.	Name	Yellow card	(yellow card) (yellow-red card)	Red card	Yellow card	(yellow card) (yellow-red card)	Red card	Yellow card	(yellow card) (yellow-red card)	Red card	Yellow card	(yellow card) (yellow-red card)	Red card
1	5	(Northern Ireland)	CB	Daniel Ballard	8	0	0	0	0	0	0	0	0	8	0	0
2	13	(England)	DM	Luke O'Nien	7	0	0	0	0	0	0	0	0	7	0	0
3	32	(Northern Ireland)	RB	Trai Hume	4	1	0	0	0	0	0	0	0	4	1	0
4	17	(France)	AM	Abdoullah Ba	3	0	0	0	0	0	1	0	0	4	0	0
4	20	(England)	LW	Jack Clarke	4	0	0	0	0	0	0	0	0	4	0	0
4	21	(England)	AM	Alex Pritchard	3	0	0	0	0	0	1	0	0	4	0	0
5	3	(England)	LB	Dennis Cirkin	3	0	0	0	0	0	0	0	0	3	0	0
5	10	(England)	RW	Patrick Roberts	3	0	0	0	0	0	0	0	0	3	0	0
5	11	(England)	ST	Mason Burstow	3	0	0	0	0	0	0	0	0	3	0	0
6	24	(England)	CM	Dan Neil	1	1	0	0	0	0	0	0	0	1	1	0
6	7	(England)	AM	Jobe Bellingham	2	0	0	0	0	0	0	0	0	2	0	0
6	22	(France)	AM	Adil Aouchiche	2	0	0	0	0	0	0	0	0	2	0	0
6	39	(France)	DM	Pierre Ekwah	2	0	0	0	0	0	0	0	0	2	0	0
7	2	(Wales)	RB	Niall Huggins	1	0	0	0	0	0	0	0	0	1	0	0
7	6	(England)	CB	Danny Batth	0	0	0	0	0	0	1	0	0	1	0	0
7	9	(Portugal)	ST	Luís Semedo	1	0	0	0	0	0	0	0	0	1	0	0
7	15	(Ukraine)	ST	Nazariy Rusyn	1	0	0	0	0	0	0	0	0	1	0	0
7	19	(Costa Rica)	LW	Jewison Bennette	0	0	0	0	0	0	1	0	0	1	0	0
7	25	(Australia)	CB	Nectarios Triantis	1	0	0	0	0	0	0	0	0	1	0	0
Total					49	2	0	0	0	0	4	0	0	53	2	0
