= Timur Tutyerov =

Ukrainian footballer (born 2005)

Personal information
- Full name: Timur Volodymyrovych Tutierov
- Date of birth: 11 June 2005 (age 21)
- Place of birth: Bakhchysarai, Ukraine
- Height: 1.83 m (6 ft 0 in)
- Positions: Winger; forward

Team information
- Current team: Sunderland
- Number: 57

Youth career
- TSK Simferopol
- Dinaz Vyshhorod
- Sant Cugat FC
- 2021–2022: Kolos Kovalivka
- 2023–2025: Sunderland

Senior career*
Years	Team	Apps	(Gls)
2022–2023	Kolos Kovalivka	0	(0)
2023–	Sunderland	2	(0)
2026	→ Exeter City (loan)	17	(3)

International career^{‡}
2023–2024	Ukraine U19	10	(2)
2025–	Ukraine U21	5	(0)
- * Club domestic league appearances and goals as of 25 October 2026 ‡ National team caps and goals as of 5 June 2026

Timur Volodymyrovych Tutierov (Ukrainian: Тімур Володимирович Тутєров; born 11 June 2005) is a Ukrainian professional footballer who plays as a winger or forward for Premier League club Sunderland.

== Early life ==
Tutierov was born on 11 June 2005. Born in Bakhchysarai, Ukraine, he is a native of the Autonomous Republic of Crimea, Ukraine.

== Club career ==
As a youth player, Tutierov joined the youth academy of Crimean side TSK Simferopol. Following his stint there, he joined the youth academy of Ukrainian side Dinaz Vyshhorod. Subsequently, he joined the youth academy of Spanish side Sant Cugat FC. In 2021, he joined the youth academy of Ukrainian side Kolos Kovalivka, and was promoted to the club's senior team in 2022.

=== Sunderland ===
In 2023, he joined the youth academy of English side Sunderland and was promoted to the club's senior team in 2024. English newspaper Sunderland Echo wrote in 2024 that he was a "regular fixture of Graeme Murty's development side" while playing for them.

On 16 January 2026, Tutierov joined League One club Exeter City on loan for the remainder of the 2025–26 season.

== International career ==
Tutierov is a Ukraine youth international. During the summer of 2024, he played for the Ukraine national under-19 football team at the 2024 UEFA European Under-19 Championship.

== Career statistics ==
As of match played 28 October 2026

Appearances and goals by club, season and competition
Club	Season	League			FA Cup		EFL Cup		Europe		Other		Total	
Club	Season	Division	Apps	Goals	Apps	Goals	Apps	Goals	Apps	Goals	Apps	Goals	Apps	Goals
Sunderland	2023–24	Championship	0	0	0	0	0	0	—		—		0	0
Sunderland	2024–25	Championship	0	0	0	0	0	0	—		0	0	0	0
Sunderland	2025–26	Premier League	0	0	0	0	0	0	—		—		0	0
Sunderland	2026–27	Premier League	2	0	0	0	2	1	2 (Note: Appearances in UEFA Europa League)	1	—		6	2
Sunderland	Total		2	0	0	0	2	1	2	1	0	0	6	2
Exeter City (loan)	2025–26	League One	17	3	—		—		—		—		17	3
Career total			19	3	0	0	2	1	2	1	0	0	23	5
