= Chris Rigg =

English footballer (born 2007)

- Rigg in 2026

Personal information
- Full name: Christopher John Rigg
- Date of birth: 18 June 2007 (age 19)
- Place of birth: Hebburn, England
- Height: 5 ft 10 in (1.77 m)
- Position: Attacking midfielder

Team information
- Current team: Sunderland
- Number: 11

Youth career
- 2017–2023: Sunderland

Senior career*
Years	Team	Apps	(Gls)
2023–	Sunderland	89	(7)

International career^{‡}
2022	England U15	4	(2)
2022–2023	England U16	9	(1)
2022–2024	England U17	14	(2)
2023–2025	England U18	8	(0)
2025–2026	England U19	15	(4)
2026–	England U20	3	(0)
- * Club domestic league appearances and goals as of 19:19, 8 November 2026 (UTC) ‡ National team caps and goals as of 18:30, 3 October 2026 (UTC)

Christopher John Rigg (born 18 June 2007) is an English professional footballer who plays as a midfielder for Premier League club Sunderland.

== Club career ==
=== Early life ===
Born in Hebburn, Rigg joined Sunderland while still in primary school.

=== Sunderland ===
With Sunderland facing numerous injuries in their squad, Rigg was named on the bench for the EFL Championship game against Blackpool on 1 January 2023. Less than a week later, he was again named on the bench, alongside fellow young player Tom Watson, for an FA Cup third-round game against Shrewsbury Town, with manager Tony Mowbray saying Rigg was "really impressive", having watched him train with the first team.

Rigg made his professional debut in the game against Shrewsbury Town on 7 January 2023, coming on as a substitute for Édouard Michut in a 2–1 win. In doing so, he became the second youngest player in Sunderland history, behind Derek Forster. Following his debut, he was promoted to the Sunderland first team, having to train with the squad only one or two days a week, as he was still in school at the time. Rigg's second appearance came in the following round of the FA Cup against Fulham, replacing Patrick Roberts in the 86th minute. In injury time, with the score at 1–1, he received a cut back from Abdoullah Ba before firing a shot into the roof of the Fulham net, only to have the goal disallowed due to Ba being offside.

He scored his first competitive goal for Sunderland in an EFL Cup tie against Crewe Alexandra on 8 August 2023. With this goal, he not only became Sunderland's youngest ever goalscorer, but also the youngest goalscorer in the competition's history. On 2 September, Rigg scored on his league debut against Southampton, netting the final goal in a 5–0 home win. In doing so he became Sunderland's youngest ever league goalscorer, breaking a record held by Jimmy Hamilton for over half a century.

Rigg's back-heeled goal against Middlesbrough on 21 September 2024 earned him the EFL Championship Goal of the Month award for September 2024. On 27 April 2025, he was named EFL Championship Apprentice of the Season. The season saw Sunderland achieve promotion to the Premier League via the play-offs.

Rigg made his Premier League debut on 16 August 2025, coming on as a substitute in a 3–0 win against West Ham United. He scored his first Premier League goal on 19 April 2026, Sunderland's first goal in a 3–4 defeat to Aston Villa. On 28 August 2025, Rigg signed a five-year contract extension with Sunderland, keeping him at the club until 2030.

== International career ==
Rigg has represented England at youth international level. He captained England at under-16 level, before being promoted to the under-17 squad while still only fifteen. He made his England U18 debut during a 1–1 draw with Belgium in Marbella on 11 October 2023.

On 2 November 2023, Rigg was included in the England squad for the 2023 FIFA U-17 World Cup. He played his first game of the competition as a starter against Iran, winning the game 2–1. Rigg came off the bench as a substitute in their next group game against Brazil and then started in the round of sixteen defeat against Uzbekistan.

On 20 May 2024, Rigg was included in the England squad for the 2024 UEFA European Under-17 Championship. He captained the side during the tournament including their quarter-final elimination by Italy.

On 19 March 2025, Rigg made his England U19 debut as a substitute during a 2–0 2025 UEFA European Under-19 Championship qualification victory over Wales. Six days later, on 25 March 2025, he scored his first goal at the under 19-level during the same qualification campaign against Portugal. Since making his debut, he has established himself in England's mid-tier youth setups, accumulating 15 appearances and scoring 4 goals.

== Career statistics ==
As of match played 31 October 2026

Appearances and goals by club, season and competition
Club	Season	League			FA Cup		EFL Cup		Europe		Other		Total	
Club	Season	Division	Apps	Goals	Apps	Goals	Apps	Goals	Apps	Goals	Apps	Goals	Apps	Goals
Sunderland	2022–23	Championship	0	0	3	0	0	0	—		0	0	3	0
Sunderland	2023–24	Championship	21	2	0	0	1	1	—		—		22	3
Sunderland	2024–25	Championship	42	4	1	0	1	0	—		3 (Note: Appearances in EFL Championship play-offs)	0	47	4
Sunderland	2025–26	Premier League	18	1	1	0	1	0	—		—		20	1
Sunderland	2026–27	Premier League	7	0	0	0	2	0	3 (Note: Appearances in UEFA Europa League)	0	—		12	0
Career total			88	7	5	0	5	1	3	0	3	0	104	8

== Honours ==
Sunderland

- EFL Championship play-offs: 2025

Individual

- EFL Championship Apprentice of the Year: 2024–25
