= Adam Richardson =

Adam Richardson may refer to:

- Adam Richardson (Australian footballer) (born 1974), Australian rules footballer
- Adam Richardson (footballer, born 2003), English football goalkeeper
