= Trai Hume =

Northern Irish footballer (born 2002)

- Hume in 2026

Personal information
- Full name: Trai Hume
- Date of birth: 18 March 2002 (age 24)
- Place of birth: Ballymena, Northern Ireland
- Height: 1.80 m (5 ft 11 in)
- Position: Full-back

Team information
- Current team: Sunderland
- Number: 32

Youth career
- –2013: Ballymena United
- 2013–2019: Linfield

Senior career*
Years	Team	Apps	(Gls)
2019–2022	Linfield	21	(3)
2020–2021	→ Ballymena United (loan)	34	(5)
2022–	Sunderland	167	(7)

International career^{‡}
2018–2019	Northern Ireland U17	6	(0)
2019	Northern Ireland U19	4	(0)
2020–2021	Northern Ireland U21	9	(0)
2022–	Northern Ireland	37	(1)
- * Club domestic league appearances and goals as of 17:03, 31 October 2026 (UTC) ‡ National team caps and goals as of 00:10, 18 November 2026 (UTC)

Trai Hume (born 18 March 2002) is a Northern Irish professional footballer who plays as a full-back for Premier League club Sunderland and the Northern Ireland national team. He previously played in the Irish Premiership for Linfield and Ballymena United.

== Early and personal life ==
Hume attended Slemish College in Ballymena and the NIFL Academy.

== Club career ==
Hume played youth football for Ballymena United and Linfield. He signed a professional contract with Linfield in January 2019 until the end of the 2020–21 season. Hume made his first team debut for Linfield as a substitute in a 5–1 Irish Premiership win against Cliftonville on 23 April 2019. On 7 September 2020, he agreed two-year contract extension with Linfield.

On 11 September 2020, Hume signed a season-long loan deal with his hometown club Ballymena United. He made his debut for the Sky Blues in a 1–0 Irish Premiership win against Coleraine on 16 October 2020. He made a total of 37 appearances in all competitions for Ballymena, scoring six goals.

He returned to Linfield for the 2021–22 season and played in the qualifying rounds for both the UEFA Champions League and UEFA Europa Conference League, establishing himself as the club's first-choice right back.

Hume scored his first goal for Linfield in a 3–0 Irish League win against Glentoran on 28 September 2021. He also scored in his final game for the club against Dungannon Swifts on 1 January 2022.

On 4 January 2022, Hume signed for EFL League One club Sunderland on a four-and-a-half-year contract for an undisclosed fee. He had made a total of 31 appearances in all competitions for Linfield, scoring three goals. He made his debut for Sunderland in a 2–1 league defeat to Cheltenham Town on 8 February 2022.

Having established himself as a regular starter in the team during the 2022–23 season, in June 2023 Hume extended his contract with the English club for a further year, until 2027, with an option for another year.

On 13 August 2025, following Sunderland's promotion to the Premier League, Hume signed a long-term contract, keeping him at the club until the summer of 2030.

On 19 April 2026, he scored his first Premier League goal in a 4-3 defeat to Aston Villa.

== International career ==
Hume has played for Northern Ireland at under-17, under-19 and under-21 youth levels. He was sent-off in a 2–0 2023 UEFA European Under-21 Championship qualification defeat against Malta on 16 November 2021.

Hume was called up to the senior Northern Ireland squad in March 2022. He made his debut in a 1–0 friendly defeat against Hungary.

Hume scored his first ever international goal against Slovakia during the 2026 FIFA World Cup qualifiers to make it 2–0, helping Northern Ireland to gain a famous victory and derailed Slovakia's qualification hope in process.

== Career statistics ==
=== Club ===
As of match played 31 October 2026

Appearances and goals by club, season and competition
Club	Season	League			National cup (Note: Includes Irish Cup, FA Cup)		League cup (Note: Includes NI Football League Cup, EFL Cup)		Europe		Other		Total	
Club	Season	Division	Apps	Goals	Apps	Goals	Apps	Goals	Apps	Goals	Apps	Goals	Apps	Goals
Linfield	2018–19	NIFL Premiership	2	0	0	0	0	0	0	0	—		2	0
Linfield	2019–20	NIFL Premiership	2	0	0	0	0	0	0	0	—		2	0
Linfield	2020–21	NIFL Premiership	0	0	—		0	0	0	0	—		0	0
Linfield	2021–22	NIFL Premiership	17	3	0	0	1	0	5 (Note: One appearance in UEFA Champions League, four appearances in UEFA Europa Conference League)	0	—		23	3
Linfield	Total		21	3	0	0	1	0	5	0	—		27	3
Ballymena United (loan)	2020–21	NIFL Premiership	34	5	3	0	0	0	—		—		37	5
Sunderland	2021–22	League One	3	0	0	0	0	0	—		0	0	3	0
Sunderland	2022–23	Championship	28	1	3	0	1	0	—		2 (Note: Appearances in Championship play-offs)	1	34	2
Sunderland	2023–24	Championship	46	1	1	0	0	0	—		—		47	1
Sunderland	2024–25	Championship	44	3	1	0	0	0	—		3	0	48	3
Sunderland	2025–26	Premier League	38	2	2	0	0	0	—		—		40	2
Sunderland	2026–27	Premier League	8	0	0	0	1	0	3 (Note: Appearances in UEFA Europa League)	0	—		12	0
Sunderland	Total		167	7	7	0	2	0	3	0	5	1	184	8
Career total			222	15	10	0	3	0	8	0	5	1	248	16

=== International ===
As of match played 17 November 2026

Appearances and goals by national team and year
National team	Year	Apps	Goals
Northern Ireland	2022	2	0
Northern Ireland	2023	8	0
Northern Ireland	2024	9	0
Northern Ireland	2025	8	1
Northern Ireland	2026	10	0
Total		37	1

Scores and results list Northern Ireland's goal tally first, score column indicates score after each Hume goal.

List of international goals scored by Trai Hume
No.	Date	Venue	Opponent	Score	Result	Competition
1	10 October 2025	Windsor Park, Belfast, Northern Ireland	Slovakia	2–0	2–0	2026 FIFA World Cup qualification

== Honours ==
Linfield

- NIFL Premiership: 2021–22

Sunderland

- EFL League One play-offs: 2022
- EFL Championship play-offs: 2025

Individual

- Northern Ireland Senior Men's Player of the Year: 2023
- Sunderland Player of the Season: 2024–25
