= Romaine Mundle =

English footballer (born 2003)

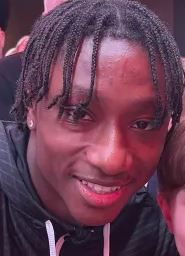
- Mundle pictured at the 2023–24 Sunderland AFC Player Awards.

Personal information
- Full name: Romaine Lee Mundle
- Date of birth: 24 April 2003 (age 23)
- Place of birth: Edmonton, England
- Height: 1.72 m (5 ft 8 in)
- Position: Winger

Team information
- Current team: Sunderland
- Number: 14

Youth career
- –2023: Tottenham Hotspur

Senior career*
Years	Team	Apps	(Gls)
2023	SL16 FC	4	(2)
2023–2024	Standard Liège	6	(0)
2024–	Sunderland	48	(6)
- * Club domestic league appearances and goals as of 16:02, 30 August 2026 (UTC)

Romaine Lee Mundle (born 24 April 2003) is an English professional footballer who plays as a winger for Premier League club Sunderland.

== Early life ==
From Edmonton, London, Mundle attended Enfield Grammar School. He was born to a Jamaican father and Kittitian mother.

== Career ==
=== Tottenham Hotspur ===
Mundle came through the youth academy at Tottenham Hotspur. He signed his first professional contract with the club in May 2021. The following season he began to train with the first team and made the match day squad for the first on 19 August 2021 in the UEFA Europa League against F.C. Paços de Ferreira.

During the 2022–23 season he played for the Spurs B team in Premier League 2, scoring seven goals and providing four assists.

=== Standard Liege ===
In June 2023, it was revealed that Mundle rejected a new contract with Spurs in order to sign a four-year contract with Standard Liege. He made his professional debut on 30 July 2023 for Standard Liege against Sint-Truiden in the Jupiler League.

=== Sunderland ===
On 1 February 2024, Mundle signed for EFL Championship club Sunderland for an undisclosed fee.

Mundle made his Sunderland debut on Saturday 10 February 2024, coming off the bench in a 3–1 win against Plymouth Argyle.

== Career statistics ==
As of match played 30 August 2026

Appearances and goals by club, season and competition
Club	Season	League			National cup (Note: Includes FA Cup)		League cup (Note: Includes EFL Cup)		Europe		Other		Total	
Club	Season	Division	Apps	Goals	Apps	Goals	Apps	Goals	Apps	Goals	Apps	Goals	Apps	Goals
Tottenham Hotspur U21	2021–22	—			—		—		—		1 (Note: Appearance(s) in EFL Trophy)	0	1	0
Tottenham Hotspur U21	2022–23	—			—		—		—		3	0	3	0
SL16 FC	2023–24	Challenger Pro League	4	2	—		—		—		—		4	2
Standard Liège	2023–24	Belgian Pro League	6	0	0	0	—		—		—		6	0
Sunderland	2023–24	Championship	11	1	—		—		—		0	0	11	1
Sunderland	2024–25	Championship	22	5	0	0	1	0	—		2 (Note: Appearances in EFL Championship play-offs)	0	25	5
Sunderland	2025–26	Premier League	14	0	2	0	0	0	—		—		16	0
Sunderland	2026–27	Premier League	1	0	0	0	0	0	0	0	—		1	0
Sunderland	Total		48	6	2	0	1	0	0	0	2	0	53	6
Career total			58	8	2	0	1	0	0	0	6	0	67	8

== Honours ==
Sunderland

- EFL Championship play-offs: 2025
