= Dayann Methalie =

French footballer (born 2006)

- Methalie with Sunderland in 2026

Personal information
- Date of birth: 15 February 2006 (age 20)
- Place of birth: Toulouse, France
- Height: 1.88 m (6 ft 2 in)
- Positions: Left-back; left wing-back

Team information
- Current team: Sunderland
- Number: 6

Youth career
- 2012–2014: Colomiers
- 2014–2025: Toulouse

Senior career*
Years	Team	Apps	(Gls)
2023–2025	Toulouse B	13	(1)
2025–2026	Toulouse	28	(2)
2026–	Sunderland	2	(0)

International career^{‡}
2024–2025	France U19	7	(1)
2025–	France U20	1	(0)
2025–	France U21	4	(2)
- * Club domestic league appearances and goals as of 17:01, 10 October 2026 (UTC) ‡ National team caps and goals as of 23:30, 17 November 2025 (UTC)

Dayann Methalie (or Méthalie; born 15 February 2006) is a French professional footballer who plays as a left-back for Premier League club Sunderland.

== Club career ==
Born in Toulouse, France to Martiniquais and Malagasy roots, Methalie signed on 26 September 2024 his first professional contract with Toulouse, a deal until 2027 with an option for an additional two years. On 16 August 2025, he made his professional debut in Ligue 1, starting in a 1–0 win away to Nice.

On 21 August 2026, Methalie joined Premier League club Sunderland for a reported transfer fee of €30m including add-ons.

== International career ==
Methalie is a France youth international, making his debut for the under-19s in 2024. He has since made his debut for the France under-20 team.

== Career statistics ==
As of match played 28 October 2026

Appearances and goals by club, season and competition
Club	Season	League			National cup (Note: Includes Coupe de France)		League cup (Note: Includes EFL Cup)		Europe		Other		Total	
Club	Season	Division	Apps	Goals	Apps	Goals	Apps	Goals	Apps	Goals	Apps	Goals	Apps	Goals
Toulouse B	2023–24	Championnat National 1	1	0	—		—		—		—		1	0
Toulouse B	2024–25	Championnat National 2	12	1	—		—		—		—		12	1
Toulouse B	Total		13	1	—		—		—		—		13	1
Toulouse	2025–26	Ligue 1	28	2	3	0	—		—		—		31	2
Sunderland	2026–27	Premier League	2	0	0	0	2	0	2 (Note: Appearances in UEFA Europa League)	0	—		6	0
Career total			43	3	3	0	2	0	2	0	0	0	50	3
