= Pierre Ekwah =

French footballer (born 2002)

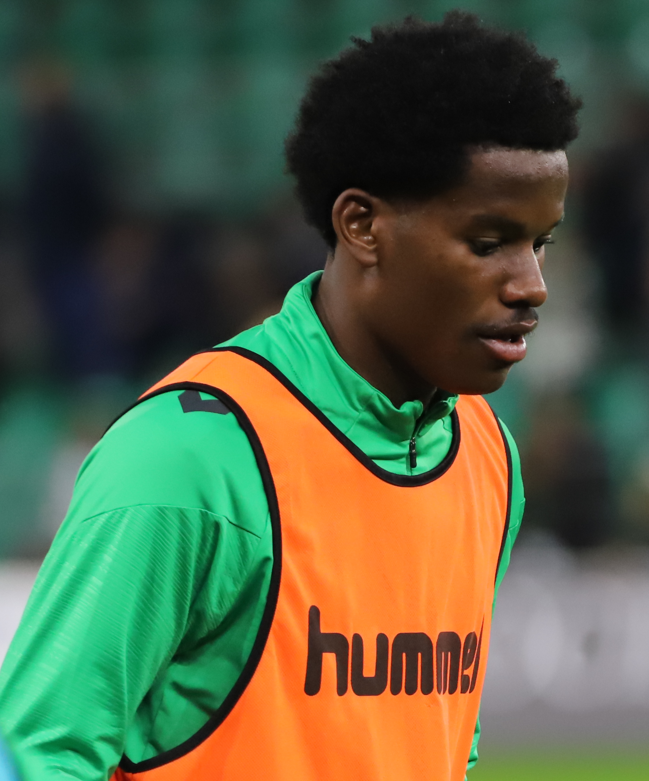
- Pierre Ekwah in 2024.

Personal information
- Full name: Pierre-Emmanuel Ekwah Elimby
- Date of birth: 15 January 2002 (age 24)
- Place of birth: Massy, France
- Height: 1.89 m (6 ft 2 in)
- Positions: Central midfielder; centre-back

Team information
- Current team: Auxerre (on loan from Saint-Étienne)
- Number: 17

Youth career
- 2009–2011: RC Arpajonnais
- 2011–2016: Bretigny FCS
- 2016–2017: CFF Paris
- 2017–2018: Nantes
- 2018–2021: Chelsea
- 2021–2023: West Ham United

Senior career*
Years	Team	Apps	(Gls)
2023–2025	Sunderland	56	(5)
2024–2025	→ Saint-Étienne (loan)	29	(1)
2025–	Saint-Étienne	0	(0)
2026	→ Watford (loan)	7	(0)
2026–	→ Auxerre (loan)	1	(0)

International career
2017–2018	France U16	13	(1)
2021–2022	France U20	5	(0)
- * Club domestic league appearances and goals as of 4 September 2026

Pierre-Emmanuel Ekwah Elimby (born 15 January 2002) is a French professional footballer who plays as a central midfielder or center-back for Ligue 1 club Auxerre on loan from Saint-Étienne.

== Club career ==
=== Early career ===
Born in Massy, Essonne, just outside of Paris, Ekwah began his career with amateur sides RC Arpajonnais, Bretigny FCS and CFF Paris, also spending two years in the INF Clairefontaine academy. He joined Nantes in 2017, spending one season before moving to England to join the academy of Chelsea. He signed his first professional deal with Chelsea in April 2019.

After three years with The Blues, in which he played in the UEFA Youth League and trained with the first team, he was linked with a move away from the club in 2021, going on trial with Portsmouth. He also trialled with West Ham United, playing the last two Premier League 2 games of the 2020–21 season for The Hammers, scoring once against Arsenal.

On 9 June 2021, West Ham United announced the signing of Ekwah from Chelsea on a three-year deal for an undisclosed fee.

=== Sunderland ===
After a year and a half, in which he was unable to break into the West Ham United first team, featuring in the EFL Trophy for the club's under-21 side, he was linked with a loan move to EFL Championship side Sunderland in January 2023. On 23 January 2023, he moved to Sunderland on a permanent transfer, penning a four-and-a-half-year deal.

=== Saint-Étienne ===
On 30 August 2024, Ekwah signed for Ligue 1 club Saint-Étienne on a season-long loan with an option to buy for €7 million. The purchase option was activated on 14 August 2025.

=== Watford (loan) ===
On 3 February 2026, Ekwah was loaned to EFL Championship club Watford until the end of the season.

=== Auxerre (loan) ===
On 26 August 2026, Ekwah moved to Auxerre in Ligue 1 on loan with an option to buy.

== International career ==
Ekwah is of Ghanaian and Cameroonian descent. Ekwah opted to represent France at youth international level.

== Style of play ==
A powerful figure, standing at 1.89 m tall, he has stated that his favourite role on the pitch is as a box-to-box midfielder, and lists Zinedine Zidane as his childhood idol. He has also played as a defensive midfielder, as well as dropping in to the back line to play as a left-back or centre-back.

== Personal life ==
Ekwah is the cousin of the footballers Paul-Georges Ntep, Ludéric, Romaric and Emeric Etonde, and the brother of the rugby player Charles-Edouard Ekwah Elimby.

== Career statistics ==
As of match played 2 February 2026

Appearances and goals by club, season and competition
Club	Season	League			Domestic Cup (Note: Includes FA Cup, Coupe de France)		EFL Cup		Europe		Other		Total	
Club	Season	Division	Apps	Goals	Apps	Goals	Apps	Goals	Apps	Goals	Apps	Goals	Apps	Goals
West Ham United U21	2021–22	—	—		—		—		—		2 (Note: Appearance(s) in the EFL Trophy)	0	2	0
West Ham United U21	2022–23	—	—		—		—		—		3	0	3	0
Sunderland	2022–23	Championship	14	0	2	0	—		—		2 (Note: Appearance(s) in the Championship play-offs)	0	18	0
Sunderland	2023–24	Championship	42	5	1	0	1	0	—		0	0	44	5
Sunderland	2024–25	Championship	0	0	0	0	1	0	—		0	0	1	0
Sunderland	Total		56	5	3	0	2	0	0	0	2	0	63	5
Saint-Étienne (loan)	2024–25	Ligue 1	29	1	1	0	—		—		—		30	1
Watford (loan)	2025–26	Championship	7	0	0	0	—		—		—		7	0
Career total			92	6	4	0	2	0	0	0	7	0	105	6
