= Abdoullah Ba =

French footballer (born 2003)

Personal information
- Full name: Abdoullah Mustapha Ba
- Date of birth: 31 July 2003 (age 23)
- Place of birth: Saint-Aubin-lès-Elbeuf, France
- Height: 1.80 m (5 ft 11 in)
- Positions: Midfielder; forward

Team information
- Current team: Sunderland
- Number: 46

Youth career
- 2010–2016: CA Pitres
- 2016–2020: Le Havre

Senior career*
Years	Team	Apps	(Gls)
2020–2022	Le Havre II	7	(1)
2021–2022	Le Havre	26	(1)
2022–	Sunderland	66	(4)
2025	→ Dunkerque (loan)	7	(1)

International career^{‡}
2019	France U16	7	(0)
2019–2020	France U17	7	(0)
2021–2022	France U19	15	(0)
2022–2023	France U20	6	(1)
2026–	Mauritania	1	(0)
- * Club domestic league appearances and goals as of 11 May 2025 ‡ National team caps and goals as of 29 September 2026

Abdoullah Mustapha Ba (born 31 July 2003) is a professional footballer who plays as a midfielder for Premier League club Sunderland. Born in France, he represents the Mauritania national team.

== Early life ==
Abdoullah Ba was born in Saint-Aubin-lès-Elbeuf, and started playing football in the Club Andelle of Pîtres.

== Club career ==
Ba came through the ranks of Le Havre, where he was offered his first professional contract during the summer 2020, becoming one of the youngest players to turn pro in the Norman club, and entering Paul Le Guen's squad for the following season. He made his professional debut for Le Havre on 4 May 2021, coming on as a substitute in the Ligue 2 game against Toulouse.

On 31 August 2022, Ba signed permanently for English EFL Championship club Sunderland, signing a five-year contract. He scored his first goal for Sunderland on 12 March 2023 in a 1–0 win against Norwich City.

On 3 February 2025, Ba returned to France and joined Dunkerque in Ligue 2 on loan for the rest of the season.

== International career ==
Abdoullah Ba is a youth international for France, making his debut for France U17 on 17 September 2019, in a friendly game against Netherlands. He is of Mauritanian descent.

On 29 September 2026, Ba made his debut for the Mauritania national team in an AFCON qualifier against Benin.

== Career statistics ==
=== Club ===
As of match played 13 August 2024

Appearances and goals by club, season and competition
Club	Season	League			National cup (Note: Includes Coupe de France, FA Cup)		League cup (Note: Includes EFL Cup)		Other		Total	
Club	Season	Division	Apps	Goals	Apps	Goals	Apps	Goals	Apps	Goals	Apps	Goals
Le Havre II	2020–21	Championnat National 3	3	1	0	0	0	0	0	0	3	1
Le Havre II	2021–22	Championnat National 3	4	0	0	0	—		—		4	0
Le Havre II	Total		7	1	0	0	—		—		7	1
Le Havre	2020–21	Ligue 2	3	1	0	0	—		—		3	1
Le Havre	2021–22	Ligue 2	18	0	1	0	—		—		19	0
Le Havre	2022–23	Ligue 2	5	0	0	0	—		—		5	0
Le Havre	Total		26	1	1	0	—		—		27	1
Sunderland	2022–23	Championship	27	1	3	0	0	0	1 (Note: Appearance in Championship play-offs)	0	31	1
Sunderland	2023–24	Championship	39	3	1	0	1	0	—		41	3
Sunderland	2024–25	Championship	0	0	0	0	1	0	—		1	0
Sunderland	2026–27	Premier League	0	0	0	0	0	0	—		0	0
Sunderland	Total		66	4	4	0	2	0	1	0	73	4
Career total			99	6	5	0	2	0	1	0	107	6
