= Jenson Seelt =

Dutch footballer (born 2003)

Personal information
- Full name: Jenson Danluca Seelt
- Date of birth: 23 May 2003 (age 23)
- Place of birth: Ede, Netherlands
- Height: 1.92 m (6 ft 4 in)
- Position: Centre-back

Team information
- Current team: Swansea City (on loan from Sunderland)
- Number: 3

Youth career
- –2017: NEC
- 2017–2021: PSV

Senior career*
Years	Team	Apps	(Gls)
2020–2023	Jong PSV	63	(7)
2022	PSV	1	(0)
2023–	Sunderland	20	(0)
2025–2026	→ VfL Wolfsburg (loan)	9	(0)
2026–	→ Swansea City (loan)	7	(0)
- * Club domestic league appearances and goals as of 7 November 2026

Jenson Danluca Seelt (born 23 May 2003) is a Dutch professional footballer who plays as a centre-back for EFL Championship club Swansea City, on loan from Premier League club Sunderland.

== Career ==
=== PSV ===
Seelt is a youth product of PSV, having joined the club in 2017 from NEC. He signed his first professional contract on 23 May 2019, the day of his 16th birthday. The deal linked him to PSV until 2022. He made his debut for Jong PSV (the reserve team of the club) on 11 December 2020, coming on as a substitute in a 3–2 loss to TOP Oss. Seelt would go on to make his PSV senior debut in a 2–1 away win over PEC Zwolle.

=== Sunderland ===
On 23 June 2023, EFL Championship club Sunderland announced that it had reached an agreement with PSV for the transfer of Seelt. The deal became subject to a medical and international clearance. The deal was completed on 25 June 2023 with Seelt joining for an undisclosed fee, signing a five-year deal.

==== Loan to VfL Wolfsburg ====
On 1 September 2025, Seelt was loaned by German club VfL Wolfsburg.

==== Loan to Swansea City ====
On 27 August 2026, Seelt joined EFL Championship club Swansea City on loan for the 2026–27 season. This followed an increased urgency for new centre-backs at Swansea following a significant achilles tendon rupture to Cameron Burgess and an injury to Ben Cabango.

== Personal life ==
Born in the Netherlands, Seelt is of Indonesian descent.

== Career statistics ==
As of match played 20 December 2025

Appearances and goals by club, season and competition
Club	Season	League			National cup (Note: Includes DFB-Pokal)		League cup (Note: Includes EFL Cup)		Other		Total	
Club	Season	Division	Apps	Goals	Apps	Goals	Apps	Goals	Apps	Goals	Apps	Goals
Jong PSV	2020–21	Eerste Divisie	5	0	—		—		—		5	0
Jong PSV	2021–22	Eerste Divisie	25	3	—		—		—		25	3
Jong PSV	2022–23	Eerste Divisie	33	4	—		—		—		33	4
Jong PSV	Total		63	7	—		—		—		63	7
PSV	2022–23	Eredivisie	1	0	0	0	—		0	0	1	0
Sunderland	2023–24	EFL Championship	17	0	0	0	0	0	—		17	0
Sunderland	2024–25	EFL Championship	1	0	0	0	0	0	0	0	1	0
Sunderland	2025–26	Premier League	2	0	—		1	0	—		3	0
Sunderland	2026–27	Premier League	0	0	0	0	0	0	—		0	0
Sunderland	Total		20	0	0	0	1	0	—		21	0
VfL Wolfsburg (loan)	2025–26	Bundesliga	9	0	1	0	—		—		10	0
Career total			93	7	1	0	1	0	0	0	95	7
