= Niall Huggins =

Welsh footballer (born 2000)

Personal information
- Full name: Niall Joseph Huggins
- Date of birth: 18 December 2000 (age 25)
- Place of birth: York, England
- Height: 5 ft 8 in (1.73 m)
- Position: Right-back

Youth career
- 2007–2009: Heworth
- 2009–2020: Leeds United

Senior career*
Years	Team	Apps	(Gls)
2020–2021	Leeds United	1	(0)
2021–2026	Sunderland	22	(1)
2025–2026	→ Wycombe Wanderers (loan)	14	(1)

International career
2019–2023	Wales U21	4	(0)
- * Club domestic league appearances and goals as of 07:41, 17 March 2026 (UTC)

Niall Joseph Huggins (born 18 December 2000) is a professional footballer who plays as a full-back.

== Early life ==
Huggins was born in York and grew up in Fulford, on the outskirts of York. He attended Fulford School in Fulford.

== Club career ==
=== Leeds United ===
After winning his division with under-8s junior side Heworth, he joined Leeds United's academy in 2009, alongside Kain Rogerson and future professional Jack Clarke. He graduated through their academy and, alongside Clarke, signed a two-year scholarship with Leeds United in May 2017. Upon signing his scholarship deal with Leeds United, he stated that he was "looking forward to the next two years", adding that he will be "working hard and putting all my effort into, hopefully, getting a 'pro' deal at the end of it". Following his two-year scholarship, he signed a year-long professional contract with Leeds in May 2019. In December 2020, he signed a contract lasting until the end of the 2022–23 season. Huggins made his professional debut as a 54th-minute substitute for Ezgjan Alioski in a 4–2 defeat at Arsenal on 14 February 2021.

=== Sunderland ===
On 20 August 2021, Huggins joined EFL League One side Sunderland on a four-year deal. It was reported by BBC Radio Leeds that he joined the club on a free transfer, but the deal included a sell-on fee.

On 4 October 2023, Huggins scored his first professional goal for Sunderland against Watford in a 2–0 home win.

Huggins signed a contract extension in October 2024 until the summer of 2026 with an option by the club for an additional year.

== International career ==
Huggins qualifies for Wales through his Welsh born father. Huggins made his debut for the Wales national under-21 side on 9 June 2019 in a 2–1 defeat to Albania.

In November 2023, Huggins was called up to the senior Wales squad for the first time.

== Style of play ==
Huggins played as a forward for Leeds' under-18 side, but transitioned to play as a left-back for their under-23 side.

== Career statistics ==
As of match played 2 December 2025

Appearances and goals by club, season and competition
Club	Season	League			FA Cup		League Cup		Other		Total	
Club	Season	Division	Apps	Goals	Apps	Goals	Apps	Goals	Apps	Goals	Apps	Goals
Leeds United	2020–21	Premier League	1	0	0	0	0	0	—		1	0
Leeds United U21	2020–21	—			—		—		1 (Note: Appearance(s) in EFL Trophy)	0	1	0
Sunderland	2021–22	League One	2	0	0	0	2	0	0	0	4	0
Sunderland	2022–23	Championship	1	0	1	0	0	0	2 (Note: Appearances in Championship play-offs)	0	4	0
Sunderland	2023–24	Championship	19	1	0	0	1	0	0	0	20	1
Sunderland	2025–26	Premier League	0	0	—		1	0	—		1	0
Sunderland	Total		22	1	1	0	4	0	2	0	29	1
Wycombe Wanderers (loan)	2025–26	EFL League One	5	0	0	0	1	0	3	0	9	0
Career total			28	1	1	0	5	0	6	0	40	1

== Honours ==
Sunderland

- EFL League One play-offs: 2022
