= Oliver Bainbridge =

English association football (born 2003) player

Personal information
- Full name: Oliver James Bainbridge
- Date of birth: 5 November 2004 (age 22)
- Place of birth: South Tyneside, England
- Position: Defender

Team information
- Current team: Boreham Wood
- Number: 3

Youth career
- –2024: Sunderland

Senior career*
Years	Team	Apps	(Gls)
2024–2026	Sunderland	0	(0)
2024	→ Kilmarnock (loan)	6	(0)
2025–2026	→ South Shields (loan)	35	(5)
2026–	Boreham Wood	16	(0)
- * Club domestic league appearances and goals as of 16:47, 5 November 2026 (UTC)

Oliver James Bainbridge (born 13 June 2005) is an English professional footballer who plays as a defender for National League club Boreham Wood.

== Career ==
=== Sunderland ===
A product of the Sunderland AFC academy, he signed a two-year professional contract with the club in 2023, with the option of an extra year. He played for the Sunderland U21 team during the 2023-24 season, and featured 20 times in the Premier League 2, scoring one and assisting two.

In August 2024, he joined Scottish Premiership side Kilmarnock on a season-long loan. He made his league debut for Kilmarnock against Celtic on 4 August 2024. He made his European debut against Tromsø IL on 15 August 2024 in the UEFA Conference League.

In September 2025, he joined National League North club South Shields on a loan deal until 4 January 2026. Bainbridge was in the 2025–26 National League North team of the season.

He departed Sunderland upon the expiry of his contract at the end of the 2025–26 season.

=== Boreham Wood ===
On 1 July 2026, Bainbridge joined National League club Boreham Wood.

== Style of play ==
A full-back, he is considered able to operate on either flank to play at left-back or as a right-back.

== Career statistics ==
As of end of 2025–26 season

Appearances and goals by club, season and competition
Club	Season	League			National cup (Note: Includes FA Cup and Scottish Cup)		League cup (Note: Includes EFL Cup and Scottish League Cup)		Other		Total	
Club	Season	Division	Apps	Goals	Apps	Goals	Apps	Goals	Apps	Goals	Apps	Goals
Sunderland	2024–25	Championship	0	0	0	0	0	0	0	0	0	0
Sunderland	2025–26	Premier League	0	0	0	0	0	0	—		0	0
Sunderland	Total		0	0	0	0	0	0	0	0	0	0
Kilmarnock (loan)	2024–25	Scottish Premiership	6	0	—		1	0	1 (Note: Appearance(s) in UEFA Europa Conference League)	0	8	0
South Shields (loan)	2025–26	National League North	35	5	4	0	—		2 (Note: Appearance(s) in National League North play-offs)	0	41	5
Career total			41	5	4	0	1	0	3	0	49	5

== Honours ==
Individual

- National League North Team of the Season: 2025–26
