= Jack Clarke (footballer, born 2000) =

English footballer

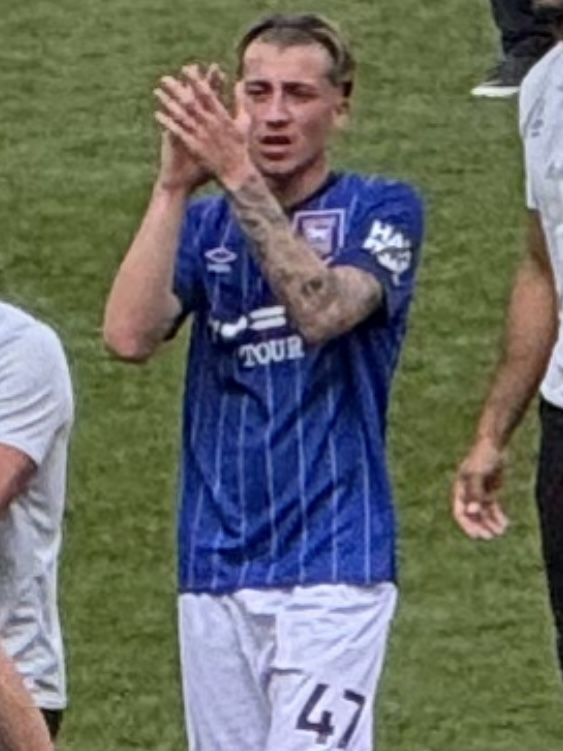
- Clarke with Ipswich Town in 2024

Personal information
- Full name: Jack Raymond Clarke
- Date of birth: 23 November 2000 (age 25)
- Place of birth: York, North Yorkshire, England
- Height: 5 ft 11 in (1.81 m)
- Position: Winger

Team information
- Current team: Ipswich Town
- Number: 47

Youth career
- –2009: Heworth Rangers
- 2009–2018: Leeds United

Senior career*
| Years | Team | Apps | (Gls) |
| 2018–2019 | Leeds United | 22 | (2) |
| 2019–2022 | Tottenham Hotspur | 0 | (0) |
| 2019 | → Leeds United (loan) | 1 | (0) |
| 2020 | → Queens Park Rangers (loan) | 6 | (0) |
| 2021 | → Stoke City (loan) | 14 | (0) |
| 2022 | → Sunderland (loan) | 17 | (1) |
| 2022–2024 | Sunderland | 87 | (25) |
| 2024– | Ipswich Town | 87 | (18) |

International career
| 2019–2020 | England U20 | 6 | (1) |
- * Club domestic league appearances and goals as of 23:03, 8 November 2026 (UTC)

Jack Raymond Clarke (born 23 November 2000) is an English professional footballer who plays as a winger for Premier League club Ipswich Town.

== Early life and education ==
Clarke was born in York, England, and attended Archbishop Holgate's School in York.

== Club career ==
=== Leeds United ===
After winning his division with under-eights' junior side Heworth, Clarke joined Leeds United's academy in 2009. He graduated through their academy and, together with Niall Huggins, signed a two-year scholarship with Leeds United in May 2017. After impressing for Leeds' under 23s, then head coach Thomas Christiansen revealed he was going to select Clarke for his first team squad in an EFL Cup fixture against Leicester City in November 2017. However, due to the club not having a professional contract with him at the time, Christiansen did not want to alert other clubs. On 24 November 2017, Clarke signed a professional contract at Leeds United.

For the 2018–19 season Clarke was given the number 47 shirt and made his professional debut on 6 October 2018, coming on as a late substitute in Leeds' 1–1 draw against Brentford at Elland Road. He scored his first goal for the club in the 56th minute of a league tie against Aston Villa at Villa Park on 23 December 2018, having come on as a half-time substitute. Clarke made his first career start in the FA Cup third-round game against Queens Park Rangers, playing all 90 minutes in a 2–1 defeat. He made his first league start for Leeds in a 2–0 win against Derby County on 11 January 2019, winning the man of the match award after assisting both goals.

During the second half of Leeds' 1–1 league tie at Middlesbrough on 9 February 2019, Clarke, who had been substituted at half-time, was stretchered off the substitutes bench in the second half and taken to hospital after collapsing. Clarke was kept under supervision at James Cook University Hospital until the following day. After a spell out recovering with a virus believed to be behind the health scare, Marcelo Bielsa said that Clarke would return to training on 4 March. He returned to the first team on 16 March as a 77th-minute replacement for Luke Ayling and went on to make seven further appearances that season, albeit none of them as part of the starting lineup. He was one of three players nominated for the club's end of season awards for Young Player Of The Season alongside Tyler Roberts and Jamie Shackleton, with Clarke winning the award on 28 April 2019, at the club's annual ceremony.

During the 2018–19 season, Clarke played 25 games in all competitions, scoring two goals, after Leeds finished the regular season in third place having dropped out of the automatic promotion places with three games left following a defeat to 10-man Wigan on 19 April. Leeds qualified for the playoffs versus sixth-placed Derby County, with Clarke coming on as a second-half substitute in the first leg of the playoffs (a 1–0 away win at Pride Park), and playing as a second-half substitute in the return leg as Leeds lost 2–4 in an encounter that saw Derby progress 4–3 on aggregate to the final against Aston Villa.

=== Tottenham Hotspur ===
On 2 July 2019, Clarke signed for Premier League side Tottenham Hotspur for an undisclosed fee until 2023. The fee was believed to be in the region of £10 million, with further add ons.

As part of the deal taking him to Tottenham, on the same day, Clarke re-joined Leeds on loan for the entirety of the 2019–20 season. He made his second debut for the club on 13 August in the EFL Cup against Salford City, and featured in the second round against Stoke City.

Clarke eventually made his first league appearance of the season on 23 November at Kenilworth Road, when he came on as a 71st-minute substitute in Leeds' 2–1 win against Luton Town for Tyler Roberts. On 27 December, Clarke's loan to Leeds was terminated early after he was recalled by parent club Tottenham by new manager José Mourinho, due to a lack of playing time at Elland Road, having made only three appearances during his brief return to the Whites. Leeds' manager Marcelo Bielsa commented, "I am very grateful with Clarke. He made his contribution in this part of the season, even if I didn't use him. In the last days, he improved his performance, but just when this process was going on Tottenham decided to ask Leeds for Clarke to come back."

He signed for Queens Park Rangers on a six-month loan deal on 16 January 2020 and made his debut for QPR two days later, coming on as a substitute against his former club Leeds in a match that ended in a 1–0 win for the Londoners.

Clarke made his debut for Tottenham on 22 October 2020, coming off the bench as an 86th-minute substitute for Carlos Vinícius in the Europa League against LASK.

On 14 January 2021, Clarke joined Stoke City on loan until the end of the 2020–21 season. Clarke played 14 times for Stoke before he suffered a season-ending achilles injury at the start of April.

He joined Sunderland on loan until the end of the 2021–22 season on 26 January 2022.

=== Sunderland ===
On 9 July 2022, he joined Sunderland on a permanent transfer for an undisclosed fee on a four-year deal. Clarke's first game was the opening Championship league game against Coventry City which finished 1–1 with Clarke scoring Sunderland's only goal in the game.

=== Ipswich Town ===
On 24 August 2024, newly promoted Premier League club Ipswich Town confirmed they had signed Clarke from Sunderland for an undisclosed fee. The BBC reported that the fee was £15 million with an additional £5 million add-ons. Clarke scored his first goal for Ipswich in a 3–0 victory against Bristol Rovers in the third round of the FA Cup on 12 January 2025.

== International career ==
On 30 August 2019, Clarke received his first international call up as a member of the England U20s squad.

He made his England U20s debut on 5 September 2019 in a 0–0 draw against Netherlands U20s. Clarke scored his first goal for the U20s with the late winner during a 1–0 victory in Switzerland on 9 September 2019.

== Style of play ==
Clarke is a versatile forward, who can play as a winger on either side. He can also play as a striker. He is known for his pace and his dribbling skills, as well as his ability to run at opposition defenders and take them on.

== Personal life ==
Former Leeds United and Republic of Ireland left-back, Ian Harte, acts as Clarke's agent.

== Career statistics ==
As of match played 8 November 2026

Appearances and goals by club, season and competition
| Club | Season | League | | | FA Cup | | EFL Cup | | Europe | | Other | | Total | |
| Club | Season | Division | Apps | Goals | Apps | Goals | Apps | Goals | Apps | Goals | Apps | Goals | Apps | Goals |
|---|---|---|---|---|---|---|---|---|---|---|---|---|---|---|
| Leeds United | 2018–19 | Championship | 22 | 2 | 1 | 0 | 0 | 0 | — | | 2 (Note: Appearances in Championship play-offs) | 0 | 25 | 2 |
| Tottenham Hotspur | 2019–20 | Premier League | 0 | 0 | — | | — | | 0 | 0 | — | | 0 | 0 |
| Tottenham Hotspur | 2020–21 | Premier League | 0 | 0 | 1 | 0 | 0 | 0 | 2 (Note: Appearances in UEFA Europa League) | 0 | — | | 3 | 0 |
| Tottenham Hotspur | 2021–22 | Premier League | 0 | 0 | 0 | 0 | 0 | 0 | 1 (Note: Appearance in UEFA Europa Conference League) | 0 | — | | 1 | 0 |
| Tottenham Hotspur | Total | | 0 | 0 | 1 | 0 | 0 | 0 | 3 | 0 | — | | 4 | 0 |
| Leeds United (loan) | 2019–20 | Championship | 1 | 0 | — | | 2 | 0 | — | | — | | 3 | 0 |
| Queens Park Rangers (loan) | 2019–20 | Championship | 6 | 0 | 1 | 0 | — | | — | | — | | 7 | 0 |
| Stoke City (loan) | 2020–21 | Championship | 14 | 0 | — | | — | | — | | — | | 14 | 0 |
| Tottenham Hotspur U21 | 2021–22 | — | | | — | | — | | — | | 3 (Note: Appearances in EFL Trophy) | 1 | 3 | 1 |
| Sunderland (loan) | 2021–22 | League One | 17 | 1 | 0 | 0 | 0 | 0 | — | | 3 (Note: Appearances in League One play-offs) | 0 | 20 | 1 |
| Sunderland | 2022–23 | Championship | 45 | 9 | 3 | 2 | 0 | 0 | — | | 2 | 0 | 50 | 11 |
| Sunderland | 2023–24 | Championship | 40 | 15 | 1 | 0 | 1 | 0 | — | | — | | 42 | 15 |
| Sunderland | 2024–25 | Championship | 2 | 1 | — | | 0 | 0 | — | | — | | 2 | 1 |
| Sunderland | Total | | 87 | 25 | 4 | 2 | 1 | 0 | — | | 2 | 0 | 94 | 27 |
| Ipswich Town | 2024–25 | Premier League | 32 | 0 | 3 | 3 | 1 | 0 | — | | — | | 36 | 3 |
| Ipswich Town | 2025–26 | Championship | 46 | 16 | 2 | 0 | 1 | 0 | — | | — | | 49 | 16 |
| Ipswich Town | 2026–27 | Premier League | 9 | 2 | 0 | 0 | 2 | 0 | — | | — | | 11 | 2 |
| Ipswich Town | Total | | 87 | 18 | 5 | 3 | 4 | 0 | — | | — | | 96 | 21 |
| Career total | | | 234 | 46 | 12 | 5 | 7 | 0 | 3 | 0 | 10 | 1 | 266 | 52 |

== Honours ==
Sunderland

- EFL League One play-offs: 2022

Individual

- EFL Championship Player of the Month: September 2023
- Leeds United Young Player of the Year: 2018–19
