= Rhys Walsh =

Northern Irish footballer (born 2006)

Personal information
- Date of birth: 8 July 2006 (age 20)
- Place of birth: Belfast, Northern Ireland
- Position: Winger

Team information
- Current team: Annagh United (on loan from Glentoran)

Youth career
- –2024: Glentoran
- 2024–2026: Sunderland

Senior career*
| Years | Team | Apps | (Gls) |
| 2023–2024 | Glentoran | 7 | (0) |
| 2025 | →South Shields (loan) | 7 | (1) |
| 2026– | Glentoran | 0 | (0) |
| 2026– | → Annagh United (loan) | 0 | (0) |

International career^{‡}
| 2022–2023 | Northern Ireland U17 | 7 | (0) |
| 2024 | Northern Ireland U18 | 1 | (0) |
| 2023– | Northern Ireland U19 | 4 | (0) |
- * Club domestic league appearances and goals as of 8 January 2026 ‡ National team caps and goals as of 1 July 2025

Rhys Walsh (born 8 July 2006) is a Northern Irish professional footballer who plays as a winger for NIFL Premiership club Glentoran.

On 5 August 2023, he made his first team debut for NIFL Premiership side Glentoran, coming on as a late substitute in a 1–0 away win against Glenavon.

On 1 July 2024 he signed for Premier League club Sunderland's academy. He joined National League North side South Shields on loan in 2025.
