= Adam Richardson (footballer, born 2003) =

English footballer (born 2003)

Personal information
- Full name: Adam Lee Richardson
- Date of birth: 7 September 2003 (age 23)
- Place of birth: Northumberland, England
- Position: Goalkeeper

Youth career
- –2024: Sunderland

Senior career*
Years	Team	Apps	(Gls)
2024–2026	Sunderland	0	(0)
2024	→ Hebburn Town (loan)		
2024	→ Blyth Spartans (loan)		

International career
2019	England U17	1	(0)
- * Club domestic league appearances and goals as of 00:15 (UTC) 16 December 2024

Adam Lee Richardson (born 7 September 2003) is an English footballer who plays as a goalkeeper.

== Club career ==
A product of the Sunderland academy, Richardson joined the club at the age of eight years-old and signed his first contract with the club 2020. Following that, despite reported interest from Premier League clubs in July 2022, he signed a new contract with the club. He signed a new three-year professional contract with the club in May 2023. He was set to be included on the Sunderland first team's pre-season tour in summer 2023, but suffered an injury set-back.

In 2024, Richardson had short-term loan spells at Hebburn Town and Blyth Spartans. He made his debut for Hebburn in the Northern Premier League's Premier Division against Lancaster City in September 2024. He made his debut for Blyth in the same division on 9 November of that year against Warrington Rylands.

== International career ==
Richardson played for England U17 against Austria U17 in September 2019 in the Syrenka Cup.
