= 2006–07 Swindon Town F.C. season =

- Chairman: Willie Carson
- Manager: Dennis Wise; Dave Tuttle (caretaker); Ady Williams (caretaker); Paul Sturrock
- Ground: County Ground, Swindon
- League Two: 3rd (Promoted)
- FA Cup: 3rd Round
- League Cup: 1st Round
- FL Trophy: 1st Round (S-E)
- Top goalscorer: League: Christian Roberts (10); Lee Peacock (10); All: Christian Roberts (13)
- Highest home attendance: 14,731 (vs. Walsall)
- Lowest home attendance: 4,938 (vs. Carlisle United)
Home colours	Away colours

The 2006–07 season was Swindon Town's first season in the League Two since the 1980s. Alongside the league campaign, Swindon Town also competed in the FA Cup, League Cup and the Football League Trophy.

== League Two ==
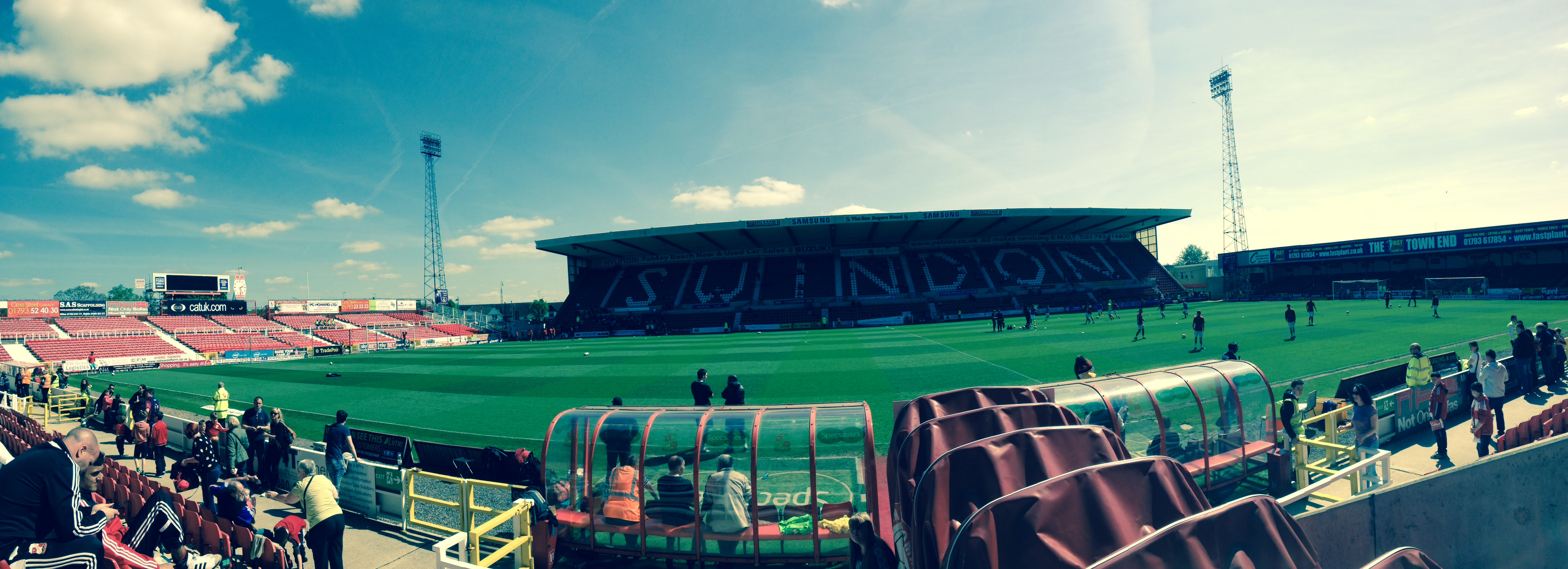
Inside the County Ground

Pos	Team	Pld	W	D	L	GF	GA	GD	Pts	Promotion, qualification or relegation
1	Walsall (C, P)	46	25	14	7	66	34	+32	89	Promotion to Football League One
2	Hartlepool United (P)	46	26	10	10	65	40	+25	88	Promotion to Football League One
3	Swindon Town (P)	46	25	10	11	58	38	+20	85	Promotion to Football League One
4	Milton Keynes Dons	46	25	9	12	76	58	+18	84	Qualification for League Two play-offs
5	Lincoln City	46	21	11	14	70	59	+11	74	Qualification for League Two play-offs

Rules for classification: In the Football League goals scored (GF) takes precedence over goal difference (GD).
(C) Champions; (P) Promoted

== Sponsors ==
Supplier: Lonsdale
Sponsor(s): Nationwide Building Society

== Pre-season ==
Win Draw Loss

=== Copa Ibiza ===
v

19 July 2006 Copa Ibiza	Ibiza Selección XI	0–5	Swindon Town	Ibiza
			Brownlie 20' 82'; Ifil 28'; Smith 44' (pen.); Turnes 90'

21 July 2006 Copa Ibiza	Huddersfield Town	1–0	Swindon Town	Ibiza
	Brandon 58'

=== Domestic friendlies ===
12 July 2006	Forest Green Rovers	2–3	Swindon Town	The New Lawn
	Jones 51'; Stonehouse 90'		Onibuje 9' (pen.); Teixeira 56' (o.g.); Roberts 66'	Attendance: 1,425; Referee: Brendan Malone (Wiltshire)

15 July 2006 Friendly	Eastleigh	1–8	Swindon Town	Corinium Stadium
	Griffin .' (pen.)		Peacock 7' 44'; Roberts 30'; Brownlie 66' 69'; Jutkiewicz 74' 84'Onibuje 88'	Attendance: 811; Referee: Brendan Malone (Wiltshire)

23 July 2006 Friendly	Swindon Town	2–2	Crystal Palace	County Ground
	Roberts 28'; Ifil 34'		Torghelle 42'; Borrowdale 56'	Attendance: 2,394

1 August 2006 Friendly	Swindon Supermarine	1–1	Swindon Town	Webb's Wood Stadium

19 December 2006 Friendly	Swindon Town	2–0	Swansea City	Behind Closed Doors
	Higgins 51'		Sturrock; Stroud	Attendance: 0

=== Wiltshire Premier Shield ===
14 November 2006 WPS SF1	Swindon Town	1–1	Salisbury City	County Ground

2 December 2006 WPS SF2	Salisbury City	2–4	Swindon Town	Tidworth
			Sturrock; Henry; Stroud

9 May 2007 WPS SF2	Swindon Supermarine	2–1	Swindon Town	Webb's Wood Stadium
	Edwards; Pratt		Hyde	Attendance: 121; Referee: M. Rushton

== League Two ==
Win Draw Loss

== The FA Cup ==
=== FA Cup results ===
Win Draw Loss

11 November 2006 FAC R1	Swindon Town	3–1	Carlisle United	County Ground
15:00	Lumsdon 9' (o.g.); Roberts 70' 90'		Gray 43'	Attendance: 4,938; Referee: K. Wright

2 December 2006 FAC R2	Swindon Town	1–0	Morecambe	County Ground
15:00	Roberts 89' (pen.)			Attendance: 5,942; Referee: P. Taylor

1 August 2014 FAC R3	Crystal Palace	2–1	Swindon Town	Selhurst Park
	Kuqi 8'; Jobi McAnuff 70'		Ifil 85'	Attendance: 10,238; Referee: Kevin Friend (Leicestershire)

== The League Cup ==
=== League Cup results ===
Win Draw Loss

12 August 2014 League Cup R1	Brentford	2-2 (AET)	Swindon Town	County Ground
19:45	Nicholas 38'; Evans 72'	Report	O'Connor 10'; Kuffour 25'	Attendance: 5,582; Referee: I. Williamson

== The Football League Trophy ==
=== Football League Trophy results ===
Win Draw Loss

17 October 2006 FLT 1 (SE)	Wycombe Wanderers	1-0	Swindon Town	Adams Park
19:45	Stonebridge 13'			Attendance: 1,583

== Matchday squads ==
=== League Two line-ups ===
Date	Opposition	V	Score	1	2	3	4	5	6	7	8	9	10	11	12	13	14	15	16
05/08/06	Hartlepool United	A	1–0	Brezovan	J.Smith	Vincent	Nicholas	Ifil	Pook	Shakes	Weston	Roberts	Peacock	Monkhouse	Evans_{1}	Jutkiewicz_{2}	Evans_{3}	Williams	P.Smith
08/08/06	Barnet	H	2–1	Brezovan	J.Smith	Vincent	Nicholas	Ifil	Pook_{1}	Shakes_{3}	Weston	Roberts	Peacock_{2}	Monkhouse	Evans_{1}	Brownlie_{2}	Onibuje_{3}	Williams	Jutkiewicz
12/08/06	Rochdale	H	1–0	Brezovan	J.Smith	Vincent	Williams	Ifil	Pook	Shakes_{1}	Evans	Roberts_{2}	Peacock_{3}	Monkhouse	Weston_{1}	Brownlie_{2}	Jutkiewicz_{3}	Nicholas	Onibuje
15/08/06	Darlington	A	2–1	Brezovan	J.Smith	Vincent	Williams	Ifil	Evans	Shakes	Weston	Roberts_{2}	Peacock_{2}	Monkhouse_{1}	Nicholas_{1}	Holgate_{2}	Brownlie_{3}	Onibuje	Jutkiewicz
26/08/06	Stockport County	H	2–0	Brezovan	J.Smith	Nicholas	Williams	Ifil	Evans_{2}	Shakes	Weston	Roberts	Peacock_{3}	Caton_{1}	Brown_{1}	Pook_{2}	Onibuje_{3}	Comyn-Platt	Jutkiewicz
01/09/06	Chester City	A	2–0	Brezovan	J.Smith	Nicholas	Comyn-Platt	Ifil	Evans	Shakes	Weston_{2}	Roberts_{1}	Peacock_{3}	Brown	Pook_{1}	Caton_{2}	Onibuje_{3}	Brownlie	Jutkiewicz
09/09/06	Wrexham	A	1–2	Brezovan	J.Smith	Nicholas	Williams	Comyn-Platt	Evans	Shakes_{3}	Weston_{2}	Roberts	Peacock	Brown_{1}	Caton_{1}	Ince_{2}	Brownlie_{3}	Vincent	Onibuje
12/09/06	Milton Keynes Dons	H	2–1	Brezovan	J.Smith_{1}	Nicholas	Williams	Ifil	Ince	Evans	Weston	Roberts_{2}	Peacock_{3}	Caton	Shakes_{1}	Onibuje_{2}	Brownlie_{3}	Vincent	Brown
16/09/06	Peterborough United	H	0–1	Brezovan	Shakes	Nicholas	Williams	Ifil	Ince_{1}	Evans	Weston_{3}	Roberts	Peacock	Caton_{2}	Brown_{1}	Onibuje_{2}	Brownlie_{3}	Vincent	Pook
23/09/06	Notts County	A	1–1	Brezovan	J.Smith	Vincent	Williams	Ifil	Pook	Onibuje_{1}	Evans	Brownlie_{3}	Peacock	Brown_{2}	Roberts_{1}	Monkhouse_{2}	Jutkiewicz_{3}	Nicholas	Weston
26/09/06	Wycombe Wanderers	A	1–1	Brezovan	J.Smith	Vincent	Williams	Ifil	Pook	Onibuje_{3}	Evans_{2}	Brownlie	Peacock_{1}	Monkhouse	Roberts_{1}	Weston_{2}	Jutkiewicz_{3}	Brown	Nicholas
30/09/06	Boston United	H	1–1	Brezovan	J.Smith	Vincent	Williams	Ifil	Pook	Roberts_{1}	Weston_{3}	Brownlie	Peacock	Monkhouse_{2}	Onibuje_{1}	Brown_{2}	Jutkiewicz_{3}	Nicholas	Evans
07/10/06	Accrington Stanley	A	1–1	Brezovan	J.Smith	Vincent	Williams	Ifil	Pook_{2}	Onibuje	Weston	Brownlie_{1}	Peacock	Monkhouse	Roberts_{1}	Evans_{2}	Brown	Shakes	Nicholas
14/10/06	Grimsby Town	H	3–0	Brezovan_{3}	J.Smith	Vincent	Williams	Ifil	Pook	Onibuje_{2}	Weston	Brownlie_{1}	Peacock	Monkhouse	Shakes_{1}	Rhodes_{2}	Nicholas_{3}	Brown	Jutkiewicz
21/10/06	Shrewsbury Town	A	2–1	P.Smith	J.Smith	Vincent	Williams	Ifil	Pook	Shakes	Weston	Onibuje	Peacock_{2}	Monkhouse_{1}	Brown_{1}	Rhodes_{2}	Whalley	Nicholas	Brownlie
28/10/06	Lincoln City	H	0–1	P.Smith	J.Smith	Vincent	Williams	Nicholas	Pook	Shakes_{1}	Weston	Onibuje	Peacock	Brown_{2}	Brownlie_{1}	Rhodes_{2}	Whalley	Henry	Stewart
04/11/06	Hereford United	H	1–2	Lonergan	J.Smith	Vincent	Nicholas	Ifil	Pook	Shakes_{1}	Evans	Roberts_{2}	Peacock	Brown	Rhodes_{1}	Onibuje_{2}	Williams	Whalley	P.Smith
18/11/06	Torquay United	A	1–0	P.Smith	J.Smith	Nicholas	Williams	Ifil	Evans_{1}	Shakes	Weston	Roberts_{3}	Brownlie_{2}	Zaaboub	Pook_{1}	Peacock_{2}	Jutkiewicz_{3}	Monkhouse	Stewart
25/11/06	Bury	H	2–1	P.Smith	J.Smith	Nicholas	Williams	Ifil	Timlin	Shakes	Weston	Roberts	Peacock_{1}	Brown_{2}	Jutkiewicz_{1}	Zaaboub_{2}	Whalley	Brownlie	Stewart
05/12/06	Mansfield Town	A	0–2	P.Smith	J.Smith	Nicholas	Williams	Ifil	Timlin	Shakes_{2}	Weston	Roberts_{1}	Jutkiewicz	Zaaboub	Brownlie_{13}	Brown_{2}	Wells_{3}	Pook	Stewart
09/12/06	Walsall	A	2–0	P.Smith	J.Smith	Vincent	Williams	Ifil	Timlin	Brown_{1}	Weston	Roberts_{2}	Jutkiewicz	Zaaboub_{3}	Pook_{1}	Shakes_{2}	Nicholas_{3}	Sturrock	Stewart
16/12/06	Bristol Rovers	H	2–1	P.Smith	J.Smith	Vincent	Williams	Ifil	Timlin	Brown_{1}	Weston_{2}	Roberts_{3}	Jutkiewicz	Zaaboub	Peacock_{1}	Shakes_{2}	Nicholas_{3}	Pook	Stewart
23/12/06	Macclesfield Town	A	1–2	P.Smith	Shakes	Vincent	Williams	Ifil	Timlin	Brown_{3}	Weston	Jutkiewicz	Peacock	Zaaboub_{1}	Evans_{12}	Sturrock_{2}	Nicholas_{3}	Pook	Stewart
26/12/06	Wycombe Wanderers	H	2–1	P.Smith	J.Smith	Vincent	Williams	Ifil	Pook	Roberts	Timlin	Jutkiewicz_{1}	Peacock_{2}	Zaaboub	Shakes_{1}	Sturrock_{2}	Brown	Nicholas	Stewart
30/12/06	Notts County	H	1–1	P.Smith	J.Smith	Vincent_{2}	Williams	Ifil	Pook	Roberts	Timlin	Jutkiewicz_{1}	Peacock_{3}	Zaaboub	Shakes_{1}	Brown_{2}	Sturrock_{3}	Nicholas	Stewart
01/01/07	Milton Keynes Dons	A	1–0	P.Smith	J.Smith	Vincent	Williams	Ifil	Pook	Shakes_{2}	Timlin	Roberts_{1}	Peacock	Zaaboub	Jutkiewicz_{1}	Brown_{2}	Nicholas	Sturrock	Stewart
13/01/07	Wrexham	H	2–1	P.Smith	J.Smith	Vincent	Williams	Ifil	Pook	Shakes	Weston_{3}	Roberts_{1}	Peacock	Zaaboub_{2}	Jutkiewicz_{1}	Brown_{2}	Sturrock_{3}	Nicholas	Stewart
20/01/07	Boston United	A	3–1	P.Smith	J.Smith	Nicholas	Williams	Ifil	Pook_{3}	Shakes	Timlin	Roberts_{1}	Peacock	Zaaboub_{2}	Jutkiewicz_{1}	Sturrock_{2}	Weston_{3}	Brown	Stewart
27/01/07	Macclesfield Town	H	2–0	P.Smith	J.Smith	Nicholas	Williams	Ifil	Pook	Shakes	Timlin	Roberts	Peacock	Zaaboub	Brown	Jutkiewicz	Sturrock	Weston	Stewart
30/01/07	Peterborough United	A	1–1	P.Smith	J.Smith	Nicholas_{1}	Williams	Ifil	Pook	Shakes_{2}	Timlin	Roberts	Peacock	Zaaboub_{3}	Brown_{1}	Jutkiewicz_{2}	Sturrock_{3}	Weston	Stewart
03/02/07	Hartlepool United	H	0–1	P.Smith	J.Smith	Nicholas_{2}	Williams	Ifil	Pook_{3}	Shakes_{1}	Timlin	Roberts	Peacock	Zaaboub	Sturrock_{1}	Weston_{2}	Jutkiewicz_{3}	Vincent	Brown
17/02/07	Darlington	H	1–1	P.Smith	J.Smith	Vincent	Nicholas	Ifil	Pook_{2}	Shakes	Timlin	Roberts_{1}	Peacock	Brown_{3}	Sturrock_{1}	Jutkiewicz_{2}	Zaaboub_{3}	Weston	Stewart
20/02/07	Barnet	A	0–1	P.Smith	J.Smith	Vincent	Nicholas_{1}	Ifil	Weston_{2}	Shakes_{3}	Timlin	Roberts	Jutkiewicz	Brown	Zaaboub_{1}	Pook_{2}	Sturrock_{3}	Noubissie	Stewart
24/02/07	Chester City	H	1–0	P.Smith	J.Smith	Vincent	Nicholas	Ifil	Pook_{3}	Roberts_{2}	Timlin	Jutkiewicz	Sturrock	Zaaboub_{1}	Weston_{1}	Brown_{2}	Noubissie_{3}	Hopper	Stewart
03/03/07	Stockport County	A	0–3	P.Smith	J.Smith_{2}	Vincent	Westwood	Ifil	Noubissie	Shakes_{1}	Peacock	Roberts	Sturrock_{3}	Timlin	Brown_{1}	Jutkiewicz_{2}	Pook_{3}	Nicholas	Stewart
10/03/07	Accrington Stanley	H	2–0	P.Smith	J.Smith	Vincent	Nicholas	Westwood	Pook	Shakes	Timlin	Roberts	Peacock	Brown	Sturrock_{1}	Jutkiewicz_{2}	Zaaboub_{3}	Noubissie	Weston
17/03/07	Grimsby Town	A	0–1	P.Smith	J.Smith	Vincent_{2}	Nicholas	Westwood	Pook	Shakes_{1}	Timlin	Roberts	Peacock	Brown_{3}	Jutkiewicz_{1}	Noubissie_{2}	Sturrock_{3}	Zaaboub	Weston
25/03/07	Lincoln City	A	3–2	P.Smith	J.Smith	Vincent	Nicholas	Ifil	Pook	Roberts_{2}	Peacock	Jutkiewicz_{3}	Corr_{1}	Zaaboub	Weston_{1}	James_{2}	Grimes_{3}	Gnakpa	Stewart
31/03/07	Shrewsbury Town	H	2–1	P.Smith	J.Smith	Vincent	Nicholas	Ifil	Pook	Roberts_{2}	Peacock	Jutkiewicz_{3}	Corr	Zaaboub_{1}	Brown_{1}	Timlin_{2}	Sturrock_{3}	Grimes	Gnakpa
03/04/07	Rochdale	A	0–0	P.Smith	J.Smith	Vincent	Nicholas	Ifil	Pook	Roberts	Peacock	Jutkiewicz_{1}	Corr	Zaaboub_{2}	Timlin_{1}	Brown_{2}	Grimes	Sturrock	Gnakpa
07/04/07	Hereford United	A	0–0	P.Smith	J.Smith	Vincent	Nicholas	Ifil	Pook	Roberts	Peacock_{3}	Jutkiewicz_{2}	Corr	Zaaboub_{1}	Timlin_{1}	Grimes_{2}	Brown_{3}	Sturrock	Gnakpa
09/04/07	Torquay United	H	2–1	P.Smith	J.Smith	Vincent	Nicholas	Westwood	Pook	Roberts_{2}	Peacock	Sturrock_{1}	Corr	Zaaboub_{3}	Jutkiewicz_{1}	Brown_{2}	Timlin_{3}	Grimes	Gnakpa
14/04/07	Bury	A	1–0	P.Smith	Nicholas	Vincent	Westwood	Ifil	Pook	Roberts_{3}	Peacock	Sturrock_{2}	Corr_{1}	Zaaboub	Jutkiewicz_{1}	Grimes_{2}	Brown_{3}	Timlin	Gnakpa
21/04/07	Mansfield Town	H	2–0	P.Smith	Nicholas	Vincent	Westwood	Ifil	Pook	Roberts_{2}	Peacock	Sturrock_{1}	Corr	Zaaboub_{3}	Jutkiewicz_{1}	Brown_{2}	Timlin_{3}	Grimes	Gnakpa
28/04/07	Bristol Rovers	A	0–1	P.Smith	Nicholas	Vincent	Westwood	Ifil	Pook	Peacock	Roberts	Sturrock_{1}	Jutkiewicz_{2}	Zaaboub_{3}	Timlin_{1}	Grimes_{2}	James_{3}	J.Smith	Brown
05/05/07	Walsall	H	1–1	P.Smith	J.Smith_{1}	Vincent	Nicholas	Ifil	Pook	Roberts	Peacock	Sturrock_{2}	Corr	Zaaboub	Westwood_{1}	Jutkiewicz_{2}	Brown	Timlin	James

_{1} 1st Substitution, _{2} 2nd Substitution, _{3} 3rd Substitution.

=== FA Cup line-ups ===
Date	Opposition	V	Score	1	2	3	4	5	6	7	8	9	10	11	12	13	14	15	16
11/11/06	Carlisle United	H	3–1	P.Smith	J.Smith	Nicholas	Williams	Ifil	Evans	Shakes_{1}	Weston	Roberts	Brownlie_{2}	Brown_{1}	Zaaboub_{1}	Jutkiewicz_{2}	Pook	Caton	Stewart
02/12/06	Morecambe	H	1–0	P.Smith	J.Smith	Nicholas	Williams	Ifil	Whalley_{1}	Shakes_{3}	Weston	Roberts	Peacock	Brown_{2}	Pook_{1}	Zaaboub_{2}	Jutkiewicz_{3}	Brownlie	Stewart
06/01/07	Crystal Palace	A	1–2	P.Smith	J.Smith	Vincent	Williams	Ifil	Pook_{3}	Shakes	Timlin	Roberts_{2}	Peacock	Zaaboub_{1}	Brown_{1}	Jutkiewicz_{2}	Sturrock_{3}	Nicholas	Stewart

_{1} 1st Substitution, _{2} 2nd Substitution, _{3} 3rd Substitution.

=== League Cup line-ups ===
Date	Opposition	V	Score	1	2	3	4	5	6	7	8	9	10	11	12	13	14	15	16
22/08/06	Brentford	H	2–2	P.Smith	J.Smith	Vincent_{1}	Nicholas	Ifil	Evans	Shakes	Holgate	Onibuje	Brownlie	Brown_{2}	Weston_{1}	Caton_{2}	Pook	Jutkiewicz	Wells

_{1} 1st Substitution, _{2} 2nd Substitution, _{3} 3rd Substitution.

=== Football League Trophy line-ups ===
Date	Opposition	V	Score	1	2	3	4	5	6	7	8	9	10	11	12	13	14	15	16
17/10/06	Wycombe Wanderers	A	0–1	P.Smith	J.Smith	Nicholas	Vincent	Ifil	Weston	Shakes_{2}	Whalley_{3}	Jutkiewicz	Brownlie_{1}	Brown	Onibuje_{1}	Pook_{2}	Monkhouse_{3}	Williams	Peacock

_{1} 1st Substitution, _{2} 2nd Substitution, _{3} 3rd Substitution.

== Squad statistics ==
=== Appearances and goals ===
As of 18 August 2014

No.	Pos	Nat	Player	Total		League Two		FA Cup		League Cup		FL Trophy	
No.	Pos	Nat	Player	Apps	Goals	Apps	Goals	Apps	Goals	Apps	Goals	Apps	Goals
1	GK	(Slovakia) SVK	Peter Brezovan	14	0	14+0	0	0+0	0	0+0	0	0+0	0
2	DF	(England) ENG	Jack Smith	46	3	41+0	3	3+0	0	1+0	0	1+0	0
3	DF	(England) ENG	Jamie Vincent	37	0	34+0	0	1+0	0	1+0	0	1+0	0
4	MF	(England) ENG	Paul Ince	3	0	2+1	0	0+0	0	0+0	0	0+0	0
4	MF	(France) FRA	Sofi Zaaboub	30	1	23+4	1	1+2	0	0+0	0	0+0	0
5	DF	(England) ENG	Jerel Ifil	45	2	40+0	1	3+0	1	1+0	0	1+0	0
6	DF	(Wales) WAL	Ady Williams	30	0	27+0	0	3+0	0	0+0	0	0+0	0
7	MF	(England) ENG	Gareth Whalley	2	0	0+0	0	1+0	0	0+0	0	1+0	0
8	MF	(England) ENG	Aaron Brown	35	2	13+17	2	2+1	0	1+0	0	1+0	0
9	FW	(Wales) WAL	Christian Roberts	45	13	39+3	10	3+0	3	0+0	0	0+0	0
10	FW	(Scotland) SCO	Lee Peacock	44	10	40+2	10	2+0	0	0+0	0	0+0	0
11	MF	(England) ENG	Andy Monkhouse	11	2	9+1	2	0+0	0	0+0	0	0+1	0
11	FW	(Ireland) EIR	Barry Corr	8	3	8+0	3	0+0	0	0+0	0	0+0	0
12	MF	(Trinidad and Tobago) TRI	Ricky Shakes	37	2	26+6	2	3+0	0	1+0	0	1+0	0
13	GK	(England) ENG	Jon Stewart	0	0	0+0	0	0+0	0	0+0	0	0+0	0
14	DF	(England) ENG	Andy Gurney	0	0	0+0	0	0+0	0	0+0	0	0+0	0
14	DF	(Wales) WAL	David Partridge (on loan from Bristol City)	0	0	0+0	0	0+0	0	0+0	0	0+0	0
15	DF	(England) ENG	Andrew Nicholas	39	3	30+5	2	2+0	0	1+0	1	1+0	0
16	FW	(Nigeria) NGA	Fola Onibuje	18	3	6+8	2	2+0	0	1+0	1	1+0	0
16	DF	(France) FRA	Patrick Noubissie	3	0	1+2	0	0+0	0	0+0	0	0+0	0
17	DF	(England) ENG	Charlie Comyn-Platt	2	0	2+0	0	0+0	0	0+0	0	0+0	0
18	DF	(Wales) WAL	Paul Evans	17	4	11+4	3	1+0	0	1+0	1	0+0	0
19	MF	(England) ENG	Michael Pook	41	2	32+6	2	1+1	0	0+0	0	0+1	0
20	FW	(Australia) AUS	Royce Brownlie	17	2	6+8	2	1+0	0	1+0	0	1+0	0
21	FW	(England) ENG	Lukas Jutkiewicz	37	5	13+20	5	0+3	0	0+0	0	1+0	0
22	MF	(Uruguay) URU	Gustavo Poyet	0	0	0+0	0	0+0	0	0+0	0	0+0	0
22	GK	(England) ENG	Andy Lonergan (on loan from Preston North End)	1	0	1+0	0	0+0	0	0+0	0	0+0	0
22	FW	(Scotland) SCO	Blair Sturrock	20	3	7+12	3	0+1	0	0+0	0	0+0	0
23	MF	(England) ENG	Curtis Weston	31	1	21+6	1	2+0	0	0+1	0	1+0	0
24	FW	(England) ENG	Ashan Holgate	2	0	0+1	0	0+0	0	1+0	0	0+0	0
25	GK	(England) ENG	Phil Smith	36	0	31+0	0	3+0	0	1+0	0	1+0	0
26	MF	(England) ENG	Dennis Wise	0	0	0+0	0	0+0	0	0+0	0	0+0	0
27	MF	(England) ENG	Ben Wells	1	0	0+1	0	0+0	0	0+0	0	0+0	0
28	FW	(England) ENG	Andrew Caton	6	0	3+2	0	0+0	0	0+1	0	0+0	0
29	FW	(England) ENG	Alex Rhodes	4	0	0+4	0	0+0	0	0+0	0	0+0	0
29	DF	(England) ENG	Ashley Westwood (on loan from Chester City)	9	0	8+1	0	0+0	0	0+0	0	0+0	0
30	DF	(England) ENG	Leigh Henry	0	0	0+0	0	0+0	0	0+0	0	0+0	0
30	FW	(England) ENG	Luke Hopper	0	0	0+0	0	0+0	0	0+0	0	0+0	0
31				0	0	0+0	0	0+0	0	0+0	0	0+0	0
32				0	0	0+0	0	0+0	0	0+0	0	0+0	0
33				0	0	0+0	0	0+0	0	0+0	0	0+0	0
34	MF	(Ireland) EIR	Michael Timlin (on loan from Fulham)	25	1	18+6	1	1+0	0	0+0	0	0+0	0
35	MF	(England) ENG	Kevin James (on loan from Nottingham Forest)	2	0	0+2	0	0+0	0	0+0	0	0+0	0
36	FW	(England) ENG	Ashley Grimes (on loan from Manchester City)	4	0	0+4	0	0+0	0	0+0	0	0+0	0
37	DF	(France) FRA	Claude Gnakpa	0	0	0+0	0	0+0	0	0+0	0	0+0	0

=== Managerial stats ===
Year	Winner
May – Oct 2006	(England) Dennis Wise
Oct – Nov 2006	(Wales) Ady Williams
Nov 2006 - End of season	(Scotland) Paul Sturrock

=== Goalscorers ===
As of 16 August 2014

Name	League 2	FA Cup	League Cup	FL Trophy	Total
Aaron Brown	2	0	0	0	2
Royce Brownlie	2	0	0	0	2
Barry Corr	3	0	0	0	3
Paul Evans	3	0	1	0	4
Jerel Ifil	1	1	0	0	2
Lukas Jutkiewicz	5	0	0	0	5
Andy Monkhouse	2	0	0	0	2
Andrew Nicholas	2	0	1	0	3
Fola Onibuje	2	0	0	0	2
Lee Peacock	10	0	0	0	10
Michael Pook	2	0	0	0	2
Christian Roberts	10	3	0	0	13
Ricky Shakes	2	0	0	0	2
Jack Smith	3	0	0	0	3
Blair Sturrock	3	0	0	0	3
Michael Timlin	1	0	0	0	1
Curtis Weston	1	0	0	0	1
Sofi Zaaboub	1	0	0	0	1
Own Goals	3	1	0	0	4
Total	58	5	2	0	65

=== Clean sheets ===
As of 18 August 2014

Includes all competitive matches.

R	No.	Pos	Nat	Name	League Two	FA Cup	League Cup	FL Trophy	Total
1	1	GK	(Slovakia)	Peter Brezovan	5	0	0	0	5
2	25	GK	(England)	Phil Smith	11	1	0	0	12
				TOTALS	16	1	0	0	17

=== Awards ===
As of 18 August 2014

Date	Player	Award
2006/07	(Scotland) Lee Peacock	Swindon Town Player of the Season

== Overall summary ==
=== Summary ===
Games played	51 (46 League One, 3 FA Cup, 1 League Cup, 1 League Trophy)
Games won	27 (25 League One, 2 FA Cup, 0 League Cup, 0 League Trophy)
Games drawn	10 (10 League One, 0 FA Cup, 0 League Cup, 0 League Trophy)
Games lost	14 (11 League One, 1 FA Cup, 1 League Cup, 1 League Trophy)
Goals scored	65 (58 League One, 5 FA Cup, 2 League Cup, 0 League Trophy)
Goals conceded	44 (38 League One, 3 FA Cup, 2 League Cup, 1 League Trophy)
Goal difference	+21
Clean sheets	16 (15 League One, 1 FA Cup, 0 League Cup, 0 League Trophy)
Yellow cards	0 (0 League One, 0 FA Cup, 0 League Cup, 0 League Trophy)
Red cards	0 (0 League One, 0 FA Cup, 0 League Cup, 0 League Trophy)
Worst discipline	
Best result	3–0 (vs. Grimsby Town)
Worst result	0–3 (vs. Stockport County)
Most appearances	Jack Smith (46)
Top scorer	Christian Roberts (13)
Points	85

Opposition	Home score	Away score	Double
Accrington Stanley	2–0	1–1	No
Barnet	2–1	0–1	No
Boston United	1–1	3–1	No
Bristol Rovers	3–1	0–1	No
Bury	2–1	1–0	Yes
Chester City	1–0	2–0	Yes
Darlington	2–1	1–1	No
Grimsby Town	3–0	0–1	No
Hartlepool United	0–1	1–0	No
Hereford United	1–2	1–1	No
Lincoln City	0–1	3–2	No
Macclesfield Town	2–0	1–2	No
Mansfield Town	2–0	0–2	No
Milton Keynes Dons	2–1	1–0	Yes
Notts County	1–1	1–1	No
Peterborough United	0–1	1–1	No
Rochdale	1–0	1–1	No
Shrewsbury Town	2–1	2–1	Yes
Stockport County	2–0	0–3	No
Torquay United	2–1	1–0	Yes
Walsall	1–1	2–0	No
Wrexham	2–1	1–2	No
Wycombe Wanderers	2–1	1–1	No
