= 2009–10 Rotherham United F.C. season =

Rotherham United
2009–2010 season
- Manager: Mark Robins (until 9 September 2009); Ronnie Moore (from 24 September 2009)
- Stadium: Don Valley Stadium
- League Two: 5th
- FA Cup: 2nd round
- League Cup: Second round
- FL Trophy: First round
- Top goalscorer: League: Adam Le Fondre (27); All: Adam Le Fondre (30)
Home colours	Away colours

The 2009–10 season was 85th season in the existence of Rotherham United F.C., a football club based in Rotherham, South Yorkshire, England. The club participated in League Two, the FA Cup, the League Cup and the Football League Trophy.

== Season summary ==
On 9 September 2009, manager Mark Robins left Rotherham to manage local rivals Barnsley. Later that month, Ronnie Moore was appointed as his replacement.

== First-team squad ==
Players' ages are as of 1 August 2009.

No.	Name	Nat	Date of birth (Age)	Place of birth	Signed from	Note
Goalkeepers
1	Andy Warrington	(England)	10 June 1976 (aged 33)	Sheffield	Bury	
30	Jamie Annerson	(England)	10 November 1988 (aged 20)	Sheffield	Sheffield United	
31	Jonathan Lund	(England)	1 November 1988 (aged 20)	Leeds	Burnley (loan)	
Defenders
3	Jamie Green	(England)	18 August 1989 (aged 19)	Rossington	—	
5	Ian Sharps	(England)	23 October 1980 (aged 28)	Warrington	Tranmere Rovers	
6	Nick Fenton	(England)	23 November 1979 (aged 29)	Preston	Grimsby Town	
12	Marc Joseph	(Antigua and Barbuda)	10 November 1976 (aged 32)	Leicester	Blackpool	
14	Mark Lynch	(England)	2 September 1981 (aged 27)	Manchester	Yeovil Town	
19	Gavin Gunning	(Republic of Ireland)	26 January 1991 (aged 18)	Cork	Blackburn Rovers (loan)	
24	Andrew Nicholas	(England)	10 October 1983 (aged 25)	Liverpool	Swindon Town	
25	Pablo Mills	(England)	27 May 1984 (aged 25)	Birmingham	Derby County	
26	David Haggerty	(England)	28 March 1991 (aged 18)	Sheffield	—	
42	Liam Darville	(England)	26 October 1990 (aged 18)	Leyburn	Leeds United (loan)	
Midfielders
2	Dale Tonge	(England)	7 May 1985 (aged 24)	Doncaster	Barnsley	
4	Danny Harrison	(England)	4 November 1982 (aged 26)	Liverpool	Tranmere Rovers	
7	Michael Cummins	(Republic of Ireland)	1 June 1978 (aged 31)	Dublin	Darlington	
8	Jason Taylor	(England)	28 January 1987 (aged 22)	Ashton-under-Lyne	Stockport County	
10	Nicky Law	(England)	29 March 1988 (aged 21)	Nottingham	Sheffield United	
11	Stephen Brogan	(England)	12 April 1988 (aged 21)	Rotherham	—	
15	Kevin Ellison	(England)	23 February 1979 (aged 30)	Liverpool	Chester City	
16	Paul Warne	(England)	8 May 1973 (aged 36)	Norwich	Yeovil Town	
17	Gary Roberts	(England)	4 February 1987 (aged 22)	Chester	Yeovil Town	sacked in April 2010
18	Adam Rundle	(England)	8 July 1984 (aged 25)	South Shields	Rochdale (loan)	
23	Josh Walker	(England)	21 February 1989 (aged 20)	Newcastle upon Tyne	Middlesbrough (loan)	
Forwards
9	Tom Pope	(England)	27 August 1985 (aged 23)	Stoke-on-Trent	Crewe Alexandra	
18	Craig McAllister	(Scotland)	28 June 1980 (aged 29)	Glasgow	Exeter City (loan)	
20	Ryan Taylor	(England)	4 May 1988 (aged 21)	Rotherham	—	
21	Marcus Marshall	(England)	7 October 1989 (aged 19)	Hammersmith	Blackburn Rovers (loan)	
22	Drewe Broughton	(England)	25 October 1978 (aged 30)	Hitchin	Milton Keynes Dons	
27	Abdulai Bell-Baggie	(Sierra Leone)	28 April 1992 (aged 17)	Sierra Leone	Reading (loan)	
29	Andy Liddell	(Scotland)	28 June 1973 (aged 36)	Leeds	Oldham Athletic	
39	Adam Le Fondre	(England)	2 December 1986 (aged 22)	Stockport	Rochdale	

== Competitions ==
=== League Two ===
==== League table ====
Pos	Team	Pld	W	D	L	GF	GA	GD	Pts	Promotion, qualification or relegation
3	Rochdale (P)	46	25	7	14	82	48	+34	82	Promotion to Football League One
4	Morecambe	46	20	13	13	73	64	+9	73	Qualification to League Two play-offs
5	Rotherham United	46	21	10	15	55	52	+3	73	Qualification to League Two play-offs
6	Aldershot Town	46	20	12	14	69	56	+13	72	Qualification to League Two play-offs
7	Dagenham & Redbridge (O, P)	46	20	12	14	69	58	+11	72	Qualification to League Two play-offs

Updated to match(es) played on unknown. Source: football-league.co.uk
(O) Play-off winners; (P) Promoted

==== Play-offs ====
Date	Round	Opponent	Venue	Result	Scorers	Attendance	Referee	Notes
15 May 2010 – 18:00	Semi-final first leg	Aldershot Town	Away	1–0	Le Fondre	5,470	D'Urso	
19 May 2010 – 19:45	Semi-final second leg	Aldershot Town	Home	2–0	Le Fondre, Ellison	7,082	Graham	
30 May 2010 – 15:00	Final	Dagenham & Redbridge	Neutral	2–3	Taylor (2)	32,054	Linington	

=== FA Cup ===
Date	Round	Opponent	Venue	Result	Scorers	Attendance	Referee	Notes
8 November 2009 – 15:00	First round	Wealdstone	Away	3–2	Le Fondre, Ellison, Broughton	1,638	Penn	
28 November 2009 – 15:00	Second round	Luton Town	Home	2–2	Le Fondre, Brogan	3,210	Tierney	
8 December 2009 – 19:45	Second round Replay	Luton Town	Away	0–3		2,518	Boyeson	

=== Football League Cup ===
Date	Round	Opponent	Venue	Result	Scorers	Attendance	Referee	Notes
11 August 2009 – 19:45	First round	Derby County	Home	2–1	Warne, Ellison	4,345	Webb	
26 August 2009 – 19:45	Second round	West Bromwich Albion	Away	3–4 (a.e.t.)	Cummins, Pope (2)	10,659	Hegley	

=== Football League Trophy ===
Date	Round	Opponent	Venue	Result	Scorers	Attendance	Referee	Notes
1 September 2009 – 19:45	First round	Huddersfield Town	Home	1–2	Le Fondre	2,246	Bratt	

== Player statistics ==
=== Appearances and goals ===
No.	Pos	Nat	Player	Total		League Two		FA Cup		League Cup		League Trophy	
No.	Pos	Nat	Player	Apps	Goals	Apps	Goals	Apps	Goals	Apps	Goals	Apps	Goals
1	GK	(England) ENG	Andy Warrington	55	0	49	0	3	0	2	0	1	0
2	DF	(England) ENG	Dale Tonge	25	0	21	0	1	0	2	0	1	0
3	DF	(England) ENG	Jamie Green	22	0	19	0	0	0	2	0	1	0
4	MF	(England) ENG	Danny Harrison	45	4	40	4	3	0	1	0	1	0
5	DF	(England) ENG	Ian Sharps	52	0	47	0	3	0	1	0	1	0
6	DF	(England) ENG	Nick Fenton	42	0	38	0	2	0	2	0	0	0
7	MF	(Republic of Ireland) IRL	Michael Cummins	17	2	15	1	0	0	1	1	1	0
8	MF	(England) ENG	Jason Taylor	4	0	2	0	0	0	1	0	1	0
9	FW	(England) ENG	Tom Pope	39	5	35	3	2	0	2	2	0	0
10	MF	(England) ENG	Nicky Law	51	2	45	2	3	0	2	0	1	0
11	DF	(England) ENG	Stephen Brogan	8	2	5	1	3	1	0	0	0	0
12	DF	(Antigua and Barbuda) ATG	Marc Joseph	18	0	15	0	1	0	1	0	1	0
14	DF	(England) ENG	Mark Lynch	28	0	26	0	2	0	0	0	0	0
15	MF	(England) ENG	Kevin Ellison	46	11	42	9	2	1	1	1	1	0
16	MF	(England) ENG	Paul Warne	17	3	15	2	1	0	1	1	0	0
17	MF	(England) ENG	Gary Roberts	15	3	13	3	2	0	0	0	0	0
18	MF	(England) ENG	Adam Rundle	4	0	4	0	0	0	0	0	0	0
18	FW	(Scotland) SCO	Craig McAllister	8	0	8	0	0	0	0	0	0	0
19	DF	(Republic of Ireland) IRL	Gavin Gunning	24	0	24	0	0	0	0	0	0	0
20	FW	(England) ENG	Ryan Taylor	26	2	22	2	2	0	1	0	1	0
21	FW	(England) ENG	Marcus Marshall	23	0	23	0	0	0	0	0	0	0
22	FW	(England) ENG	Drewe Broughton	20	4	17	3	2	1	0	0	1	0
23	MF	(England) ENG	Josh Walker	15	3	15	3	0	0	0	0	0	0
24	DF	(England) ENG	Andy Nicholas	10	0	7	0	2	0	1	0	0	0
25	DF	(England) ENG	Pablo Mills	43	0	40	0	1	0	2	0	0	0
26	DF	(England) ENG	David Haggerty	0	0	0	0	0	0	0	0	0	0
27	FW	(Sierra Leone) SLE	Abdulai Bell-Baggie	12	0	12	0	0	0	0	0	0	0
29	MF	(Scotland) SCO	Andy Liddell	5	0	2	0	0	0	2	0	1	0
30	GK	(England) ENG	Jamie Annerson	0	0	0	0	0	0	0	0	0	0
31	GK	(England) ENG	Jonathan Lund	0	0	0	0	0	0	0	0	0	0
39	FW	(England) ENG	Adam Le Fondre	51	30	47	27	3	2	0	0	1	1
42	DF	(England) ENG	Liam Darville	0	0	0	0	0	0	0	0	0	0
