= 2022–23 Sunderland A.F.C. season =

English football club season

Sunderland
2022–23 season
- Owner: Kyril Louis-Dreyfus
- Chairman: Kyril Louis-Dreyfus
- Manager: Alex Neil (until 28 August); Tony Mowbray (from 30 August)
- Stadium: Stadium of Light
- Championship: 6th
- Play-offs: Semi-finals
- FA Cup: Fourth round
- EFL Cup: First round
- Top goalscorer: League: Amad (13); All: Amad (14)
- Highest home attendance: 44,944 vs Watford (EFL Championship); 46,060 vs Luton Town (Championship play-offs)
- Lowest home attendance: 35,900 vs Blackpool (EFL Championship); 29,651 vs Fulham (FA Cup)
- Average home league attendance: 39,140
- Biggest win: 3–0 v Rotherham (H) (31 August 2022); 0–3 v Reading (A) (14 September 2022); 3–0 v Millwall (H) (3 December 2022); 1–4 v Wigan Athletic (A) (29 December 2022); 0–3 v Queens Park Rangers (A) (14 February 2023); 0–3 v Preston North End (A) (6 May 2023)
- Biggest defeat: 1–5 v Stoke City (H) (4 March 2023)
Home colours	Away colours

The 2022–23 season was Sunderland's 144th season in their existence, and the club's first season return in the Championship since the 2017–18 season, following their promotion via the play-offs in the previous season. In addition to the league, they also competed in the FA Cup and the EFL Cup.

The club finished sixth in the Championship, and were defeated by Luton Town in the play off semi-finals.

== First team squad ==
As of match(es) played on 20 March 2023

Squad No.	Name	Nationality	Position(s)	Age	Ends	Signed from	Apps	Goals
Goalkeepers
1	Anthony Patterson	(England)	GK	26	2026	Academy	67	0
12	Alex Bass	(England)	GK	28	2025	(England) Portsmouth	2	0
Defenders
2	Niall Huggins	(Wales)	RB	25	2025	(England) Leeds United	6	0
3	Dennis Cirkin	(England)	LB	24	2024	(England) Tottenham Hotspur	63	2
5	Daniel Ballard	(Northern Ireland)	CB	27	2025	(England) Arsenal	22	0
6	Danny Batth	(England)	CB	36	2023	(England) Stoke City	49	1
26	Bailey Wright	(Australia)	CB	34	2024	(England) Bristol City	107	4
32	Trai Hume	(Northern Ireland)	RB	24	2026	(Northern Ireland) Linfield	27	0
42	Aji Alese	(England)	CB	25	2025	(England) West Ham United	23	1
45	Joe Anderson	(England)	CB	25	2026	(England) Everton	1	0
Midfielders
4	Corry Evans	(Northern Ireland)	CM	36	2023	(England) Blackburn Rovers	64	2
7	Leon Dajaku	(Germany)	RW	25	2024	(Germany) Union Berlin	36	4
8	Elliot Embleton	(England)	AM	27	2025	Academy	92	11
10	Patrick Roberts	(England)	RW	29	2024	(England) Manchester City	55	6
11	Lynden Gooch	(United States)	AM	30	2024	Academy	235	25
13	Luke O'Nien	(England)	CM	31	2024	(England) Wycombe Wanderers	212	17
15	Carl Winchester	(Northern Ireland)	CM	33	2023	(England) Forest Green Rovers	67	4
16	Amad	(Ivory Coast)	RW	24	2023	(England) Manchester United (loan)	32	9
17	Abdoullah Ba	(France)	CM	23	2027	(France) Le Havre	25	1
18	Ellis Taylor	(England)	LW	23	2024	Academy	4	0
19	Jewison Bennette	(Costa Rica)	LW	22	2026	(Costa Rica) Herediano	18	2
20	Jack Clarke	(England)	LW	25	2026	(England) Tottenham Hotspur	60	10
21	Alex Pritchard	(England)	AM	33	2023	(England) Huddersfield Town	80	6
22	Isaac Lihadji	(France)	RW	24	2025	(France) Lille	3	0
23	Jack Diamond	(England)	LW	26	2024	Academy	45	2
24	Dan Neil	(England)	CM	24	2026	Academy	94	6
25	Edouard Michut	(France)	CM	23	2023	(France) Paris Saint-Germain (loan)	20	1
27	Jay Matete	(England)	CM	25	2026	(England) Fleetwood Town	25	0
29	Harrison Sohna	(England)	CM	24	2023	(England) Aston Villa	4	0
31	Chris Rigg	(England)	CM	19	2024	Academy	3	0
33	Michael Spellman	(England)	LW	24	2023	(England) Chester-le-Street United	1	0
34	Caden Kelly	(England)	CM	22	2024	Academy	2	0
39	Pierre Ekwah	(France)	CM	24	2027	West Ham United	9	0
Forwards
9	Ellis Simms	(England)	ST	25	2023	(England) Everton (loan)	17	7
14	Ross Stewart	(Scotland)	ST	30	2023	(Scotland) Ross County	81	40
28	Joe Gelhardt	(England)	ST	24	2023	(England) Leeds United (loan)	10	1

== Transfers ==
=== In ===
Date	Position	Nationality	Name	From	Fee	Ref.
1 July 2022	CB	(Northern Ireland)	Daniel Ballard	(England) Arsenal	Undisclosed	
1 July 2022	RW	(Germany)	Leon Dajaku	(Germany) Union Berlin	Undisclosed	
1 July 2022	LW	(England)	Michael Spellman	(England) Chester-le-Street United	Free Transfer	
9 July 2022	RW	(England)	Jack Clarke	(England) Tottenham Hotspur	Undisclosed	
15 July 2022	CB	(England)	Aji Alese	(England) West Ham United	Undisclosed	
22 July 2022	CB	(England)	Ben Crompton	(England) Shrewsbury Town	Free Transfer	
22 July 2022	AM	(England)	Owen Robinson	(England) AFC Fylde	Free Transfer	
22 July 2022	ST	(England)	Max Thompson	(England) Burnley	Undisclosed	
22 July 2022	CB	(England)	Callum Wilson	(England) Shrewsbury Town	Free Transfer	
26 July 2022	GK	(England)	Alex Bass	(England) Portsmouth	Undisclosed	
12 August 2022	LB	(England)	Connor Pye	(England) Morecambe	Undisclosed	
12 August 2022	DM	(England)	Tom Chiabi	(Wales) Cardiff City	Free Transfer	
25 August 2022	LW	(Costa Rica)	Jewison Bennette	(Costa Rica) Herediano	Undisclosed	
31 August 2022	CM	(France)	Abdoullah Ba	(France) Le Havre	Undisclosed	
23 January 2023	CM	(France)	Pierre Ekwah	(England) West Ham United	Undisclosed	
27 January 2023	RW	(France)	Isaac Lihadji	(France) Lille	Undisclosed	
31 January 2023	CB	(England)	Joe Anderson	(England) Everton	Undisclosed	
13 April 2023	CF	(Ukraine)	Timur Tuterov	(Ukraine) Kolos Kovalivka	Free Transfer	

=== Out ===
Date	Position	Nationality	Name	To	Fee	Ref.
30 June 2022	CB	(England)	Patrick Almond	(England) Shildon	Released	
30 June 2022	GK	(England)	Lee Burge	(England) Northampton Town	Released	
30 June 2022	ST	(England)	Luke Chapman	Unattached	Released	
30 June 2022	LW	(Scotland)	Cieran Dunne	(Scotland) Cove Rangers	Released	
30 June 2022	LB	(England)	Tyrese Dyce	Unattached	Released	
30 June 2022	CB	(England)	Ugonna Emenike	(England) Bowers & Pitsea	Released	
30 June 2022	ST	(Northern Ireland)	Will Grigg	(England) Milton Keynes Dons	Released	
30 June 2022	RW	(England)	Nicky Gyimah	(England) Broadfields United	Released	
30 June 2022	ST	(England)	Will Harris	(England) Gateshead	Released	
30 June 2022	RB	(England)	Sam Irons	(England) Whitley Bay	Released	
30 June 2022	LW	(Republic of Ireland)	Aiden McGeady	(Scotland) Hibernian	Released	
30 June 2022	GK	(England)	Jack McIntyre	(Northern Ireland) Larne	Released	
30 June 2022	RB	(England)	Kenton Richardson	(England) Gateshead	Released	
30 June 2022	DM	(England)	Lachraj Singh	Unattached	Released	
30 June 2022	LM	(England)	Vinnie Steels	(England) Shildon	Released	
30 June 2022	AM	(England)	Stephen Wearne	(England) Grimsby Town	Released	
30 June 2022	DM	(England)	Sam Wilding	(England) Hednesford Town	Released	
30 June 2022	CB	(England)	Jordan Willis	(England) Wycombe Wanderers	Released	
30 June 2022	CB	(Kosovo)	Arbenit Xhemajli	(Liechtenstein) FC Vaduz	Released	
7 July 2022	CM	(England)	Sonny Singh	(England) Stoke City	Undisclosed	
5 January 2023	CB	(England)	Jordan Willis	(England) Wycombe Wanderers	Released	

=== Loans in ===
Date from	Position	Nationality	Name	From	Date until	Ref.
29 July 2022	ST	(England)	Ellis Simms	(England) Everton	31 December 2022 (Note: On 31 December, Simms was recalled to Everton)	
30 August 2022	CM	(France)	Édouard Michut	(France) Paris Saint-Germain	End of Season	
31 August 2022	RW	(Ivory Coast)	Amad	(England) Manchester United	End of Season	
27 January 2023	CF	(England)	Joe Gelhardt	(England) Leeds United	End of Season	

=== Loans out ===
Date from	Position	Nationality	Name	To	Date until	Ref.
28 July 2022	LM	(England)	Ellis Taylor	(England) Hartlepool United	31 December 2022 (Note: On 31 December, Taylor was recalled by Sunderland)	
29 August 2022	LW	(England)	Jack Diamond	(England) Lincoln City	30 March 2023 (Note: On 30 March, Diamond's loan at Lincoln City was terminated)	
1 September 2022	CM	(Northern Ireland)	Carl Winchester	(England) Shrewsbury Town	End of Season	
23 September 2022	LW	(England)	Michael Spellman	(England) Whitby Town	23 October 2022	
6 January 2023	CM	(England)	Jay Matete	(England) Plymouth Argyle	End of Season	
26 January 2023	SS	(Germany)	Leon Dajaku	(Switzerland) St. Gallen	End of Season	
27 January 2023	LB	(England)	Nathan Newall	(England) Darlington	End of Season	
31 January 2023	CB	(Australia)	Bailey Wright	(England) Rotherham United	End of Season	
4 February 2023	LW	(England)	Michael Spellman	(England) Blyth Spartans	End of Season	
21 February 2023	LB	(England)	Connor Pye	(England) Morpeth Town	21 March 2023	
27 February 2023	AM	(England)	Owen Robinson	(England) Lancaster City	27 March 2023	
7 March 2023	CM	(England)	Tom Chiabi	(England) Morpeth Town	8 May 2023	
23 March 2023	CF	(England)	Harry Gardiner	(England) South Shields	End of Season	
23 March 2023	RB	(England)	Ethan Kachosa	(England) Guiseley	End of Season	
23 March 2023	GK	(England)	Adam Richardson	(England) Guiseley	End of Season	
24 March 2023	CM	(England)	Tom Scott	(England) Kettering Town	End of Season	

== Pre-season and friendlies ==
Sunderland announced they would travel to Portugal for a training camp which would include two pre-season friendlies. On 8 June, the club announced seven pre-season friendlies. A further addition to the Portugal tour schedule was confirmed, against Roma.

Win Draw Loss Fixtures

2 July 2022 Friendly	Sunderland	4–0	Blyth Spartans	Cleadon
TBA BST	O'Nien (?); Gooch (?); Kelly (?); Dajaku (?)	Report		Stadium: Academy of Light; Attendance: 0 (Behind-closed-doors)

2 July 2022 Friendly	Sunderland	2–0	Gateshead	Cleadon
TBA BST		Report		Stadium: Academy of Light; Attendance: 0 (Behind-closed-doors)

9 July 2022 Friendly	Rangers	Abandoned	Sunderland	Albufeira, Portugal
20:00 WEST			O'Nien 28'	Stadium: Estádio Municipal de Albufeira
Note: Match was postponed ahead of the second half due to power failure at the stadium.

13 July 2022 Friendly	Roma	2–0	Sunderland	Albufeira, Portugal
11:00 WEST	Afena-Gyan 73'; Zaniolo 79'	Report		Stadium: Estádio Municipal de Albufeira

16 July 2022 Friendly	Dundee United	0–2	Sunderland	Dundee, Scotland
15:00 BST		Report	Hume 52'; Mulgrew 60' (o.g.)	Stadium: Tannadice Park

19 July 2022 Friendly	Bradford City	2–0	Sunderland	Bradford
19:00 BST	Osadebe 51'; Walker 75' (pen.)	Report		Stadium: Valley Parade

23 July 2022 Friendly	Accrington Stanley	2–1	Sunderland	Accrington
15:00 BST	McConville 62' (pen.); Adedoyin 75'	Report	Stewart 45+2' (pen.)	Stadium: Wham Stadium; Attendance: 1,782

25 July 2022 Friendly	Hartlepool United	1–1	Sunderland	Hartlepool
19:00 BST	Hastie 2'	Report	Embleton 45+1' (pen.)	Stadium: Suit Direct Stadium

25 November 2022 Friendly	Al-Shabab	0–1	Sunderland	Dubai
13:00 GMT		Report	Amad 35'	Stadium: TBA

== Competitions ==
=== Overall record ===
Competition	First match	Last match	Starting round	Record							
Competition	First match	Last match	Starting round	Pld	W	D	L	GF	GA	GD	Win %
Championship	31 July 2022	8 May 2023	Matchday 1	46	18	15	13	68	55	+13	39.13
FA Cup	7 January 2023	8 February 2023	Third round	3	1	1	1	5	5	+0	33.33
EFL Cup	10 August 2022	10 August 2022	First round	1	0	0	1	0	2	−2	0.00
Total				50	19	16	15	73	62	+11	38.00

Last updated: 18 April 2023
Source: [Soccerway]

=== Championship ===
==== League table ====
Pos	Team	Pld	W	D	L	GF	GA	GD	Pts	Promotion, qualification or relegation
3	Luton Town (O, P)	46	21	17	8	57	39	+18	80	Qualification for Championship play-offs
4	Middlesbrough	46	22	9	15	84	56	+28	75	Qualification for Championship play-offs
5	Coventry City	46	18	16	12	58	46	+12	70	Qualification for Championship play-offs
6	Sunderland	46	18	15	13	68	55	+13	69	Qualification for Championship play-offs
7	Blackburn Rovers	46	20	9	17	52	54	−2	69	
8	Millwall	46	19	11	16	57	50	+7	68	
9	West Bromwich Albion	46	18	12	16	59	53	+6	66	

Source: EFL Official Website
Rules for classification: 1) Points; 2) Goal difference; 3) Number of goals scored; 4) Head-to-head results; 5) Wins; 6) Away goals; 7) Penalty points (sec 9.5); 8) 12-point sending off offences
(O) Play-off winners; (P) Promoted

==== Results summary ====
Overall								Home						Away					
Pld	W	D	L	GF	GA	GD	Pts	W	D	L	GF	GA	GD	W	D	L	GF	GA	GD
46	18	15	13	68	55	+13	69	7	9	7	33	33	0	11	6	6	35	22	+13

Last updated: 08 May 2023.
Source: [Soccerway]

==== Results by round ====
Round	1	2	3	4	5	6	7	8	9	10	11	12	13	14	15	16	17	18	19	20	21	22	23	24	25	26	27	28	29	30	31	32	33	34	35	36	37	38	39	40	41	42	43	44	45	46
Ground	H	A	H	A	A	H	H	A	A	A	H	H	A	H	A	H	A	A	H	A	H	H	A	H	A	A	H	H	A	H	A	H	A	A	H	A	H	H	A	H	A	H	H	A	H	A
Result	D	W	D	L	W	L	W	L	W	D	D	D	L	W	L	L	D	W	L	W	W	L	D	W	W	D	L	W	D	W	W	D	L	L	L	W	L	D	D	D	W	W	D	W	D	W
Position	13	2	6	11	5	12	8	8	6	5	7	7	11	9	12	13	16	12	13	12	10	11	12	9	4	8	10	9	9	7	5	6	8	9	10	10	12	11	12	11	10	9	8	6	7	6
Points	1	4	5	5	8	8	11	11	14	15	16	17	17	20	20	20	21	24	24	27	30	30	31	34	37	38	38	41	42	45	48	49	49	49	49	52	52	53	54	55	58	61	62	65	66	69

Updated to match(es) played on 08 May 2023. Source: [Soccerway]
A = Away; H = Home; W = Win; D = Draw; L = Loss; P = Postponed

==== Matches ====
Win Draw Loss Fixtures

On 23 June, the league fixtures were announced.

31 July 2022 1	Sunderland	1–1	Coventry City	Sunderland
12:00 BST	Clarke 12', (yellow card) 51'; Evans (yellow card) 55'; Ballard (yellow card) 76'; O'Nien (yellow card) 90+4'	Report	Hamer (yellow card) 20'; Gyökeres 84'	Stadium: Stadium of Light; Attendance: 40,851 (1,800 away); Referee: Darren Bond

6 August 2022 2	Bristol City	2–3	Sunderland	Bristol
15:00 BST	Weimann 10'; Williams (yellow card) 27'; Martin 51'; Sykes (yellow card) 58'	Report	Evans (yellow card) 2'; Simms 5', 53'; Cirkin (yellow card) 20'; Stewart 72'	Stadium: Ashton Gate Stadium; Attendance: 24,543 (3,338 away); Referee: Keith Stroud

13 August 2022 3	Sunderland	2–2	Queens Park Rangers	Sunderland
15:00 BST	Clarke (yellow card) 26'; Stewart 31'; Simms 40'; Evans (yellow card) 41'; Gooch (yellow card) 85'	Report	Field (yellow card) 30'; Dickie (yellow card) 38'; Chair 87'; Dieng 90+2'	Stadium: Stadium of Light; Attendance: 37,884 (900 away); Referee: Jeremy Simpson

17 August 2022 4	Sheffield United	2–1	Sunderland	Sheffield
20:00 BST	Ahmedhodžić 33'; Lowe 47'; McBurnie (yellow card) 90+4'	Report	Neil (red card) 31'; Gooch 55', (yellow card) 72'; O'Nien (yellow card) 64'; Matete (yellow card) 90+4'; Wright (yellow card) 90+7'	Stadium: Bramall Lane; Attendance: 28,197 (2,572 away); Referee: James Linington

20 August 2022 5	Stoke City	0–1	Sunderland	Stoke-on-Trent
15:00 BST	Taylor (yellow card) 45+4'; Delap (yellow card) 48'; Brown (yellow card) 58'	Report	O'Nien (yellow card) 13'; Matete (yellow card) 18'; Embleton (yellow card) 42'; Stewart 45+2'; Wright (yellow card) 49'; Clarke (yellow card) 63'; Pritchard (yellow card) 81'	Stadium: Bet365 Stadium; Attendance: 21,230 (2,629 away); Referee: Oliver Langford

27 August 2022 6	Sunderland	0–1	Norwich City	Sunderland
12:30 BST	Cirkin (yellow card) 25'; O'Nien (yellow card) 35'	Report	Sargent 76', (yellow card) 90+1'; Krul (yellow card) 90+2'	Stadium: Stadium of Light; Attendance: 36,440 (1,000 away); Referee: Tim Robinson

31 August 2022 7	Sunderland	3–0	Rotherham United	Sunderland
19:45 BST	Stewart 52', 65'; Clarke 70'	Report	Peltier (yellow card) 26'; Norton-Cuffy (yellow card) 51'; Barlaser (yellow card) 54'; Ferguson (yellow card) 67'	Stadium: Stadium of Light; Attendance: 36,530 (712 away); Referee: Tony Harrington

5 September 2022 8	Middlesbrough	1–0	Sunderland	Middlesbrough
20:00 BST	McGree 25'; McNair (yellow card) 38'; Clarke (yellow card) 40'; Crooks (yellow card) 72'; Jones (yellow card) 80'; Smith (yellow card) 90+2'	Report	Pritchard (yellow card) 41'	Stadium: Riverside Stadium; Attendance: 30,391 (3,200 away); Referee: Darren Bond

14 September 2022 9	Reading	0–3	Sunderland	Reading
20:00 BST	Yiadom (yellow card) 71'	Report	Roberts 39', 41'; Alese (yellow card) 62'; Clarke 69'	Stadium: Select Car Leasing Stadium; Attendance: 12,061 (1,800 away); Referee: Matt Donohue

17 September 2022 10	Watford	2–2	Sunderland	Watford
15:00 BST	Davis 34'; O'Nien 62' (o.g.)	Report	Alese 45'; Roberts (yellow card) 59'; Evans (yellow card) 61'; Bennette 87', (yellow card) 88'; Matete (yellow card) 90+5'	Stadium: Vicarage Road; Attendance: 19,767 (1,969 away); Referee: John Busby

1 October 2022 11	Sunderland	0–0	Preston North End	Sunderland
15:00 BST	Roberts (yellow card) 60'	Report	Lindsay (yellow card) 55'	Stadium: Stadium of Light; Attendance: 41,825 (2,700 away); Referee: Andy Woolmer

4 October 2022 12	Sunderland	0–0	Blackpool	Sunderland
19:45 BST	Michut (yellow card) 85'	Report	Patino (yellow card) 56'; Thorniley (yellow card) 64'; Dougall (yellow card) 83'	Stadium: Stadium of Light; Attendance: 35,900 (524 away); Referee: Jeremy Simpson

8 October 2022 13	Swansea City	2–1	Sunderland	Landore
15:00 BST	Cooper 13'; Darling 45+1'; Fulton (yellow card) 54'; Latibeaudiere (yellow card) 90+4'	Report	Neil (yellow card) 16'; Evans (yellow card) 23'; Clarke 51' (yellow card) 90+7'; Embleton (yellow card) 54'; Gooch (yellow card) 90+7'	Stadium: Swansea.com Stadium; Attendance: 18,008 (1,989 away); Referee: Gavin Ward

15 October 2022 14	Sunderland	2–1	Wigan Athletic	Sunderland
15:00 BST	Embleton (yellow card) 25' (goal) 54'; Cirkin 72'; Pritchard (yellow card) 83'; Patterson (yellow card) 83'	Report	Tilt (yellow card) 29'; Wyke 44'; Keane (yellow card) 90+6'	Stadium: Stadium of Light; Attendance: 37,060 (900 away); Referee: Keith Stroud

18 October 2022 15	Blackburn Rovers	2–0	Sunderland	Blackburn
19:45 BST	Brereton Díaz 32'; Morton (yellow card) 40'; Wharton 49'; Szmodics (yellow card) 65'; Carter (yellow card) 74'	Report	Pritchard (yellow card) 30'; Cirkin (yellow card) 48'; Bennette (yellow card) 66'	Stadium: Ewood Park; Attendance: 15,171 (3,472 away); Referee: Craig Pawson

22 October 2022 16	Sunderland	2–4	Burnley	Sunderland
19:45 BST	Amad 16'; Neil 20'; Batth (yellow card) 72'	Report	Guðmundsson (yellow card) 2'; Tella 50'; Harwood-Bellis (yellow card) 52'; Benson 61'; Zaroury 69'; Brownhill (yellow card) 80' (goal) 87'	Stadium: Stadium of Light; Attendance: 39,349 (2,700 away); Referee: Tim Robinson

29 October 2022 17	Luton Town	1–1	Sunderland	Luton
15:00 BST	Doughty (yellow card) 23'; Adebayo (yellow card) 33'; Morris 45+2'	Report	Evans (yellow card) 24'; Cirkin (yellow card) 63'; Embleton 78'; Clarke (yellow card) 90+2'	Stadium: Kenilworth Road; Attendance: 10,060 (1,100 away); Referee: James Linington

2 November 2022 18	Huddersfield Town	0–2	Sunderland	Huddersfield
19:45 GMT	Camara (yellow card) 43'; Holmes (yellow card) 82'	Report	Pritchard 55'; Batth (yellow card) 58'; Ba (yellow card) 87'; Amad 90+6'	Stadium: John Smith's Stadium; Attendance: 19,341 (2,400 away); Referee: Oliver Langford

5 November 2022 19	Sunderland	0–1	Cardiff City	Sunderland
15:00 GMT	Batth (yellow card) 13'; Neil (yellow card) 32'; O'Nien (yellow card) 45+2'; Embleton (yellow card) 90+5'	Report	Harris 49'; Wintle (yellow card) 53'; Nkounkou (yellow card) 65'; Kipré (yellow card) 90+5'	Stadium: Stadium of Light; Attendance: 37,015 (720 away); Referee: Andy Davies

11 November 2022 20	Birmingham City	1–2	Sunderland	Birmingham
20:00 GMT	Mejbri (yellow card) 28'; Jutkiewicz 78'; Longelo (yellow card) 90+7'	Report	Simms 25'; Huggins (yellow card) 42'; Amad 49'; Evans (yellow card) 74'; Matete (yellow card) 88'; Clarke (yellow card) 90+7'	Stadium: St Andrew's Stadium; Attendance: 18,702 (2,300 away); Referee: Andrew Madley

3 December 2022 21	Sunderland	3–0	Millwall	Sunderland
12:30 GMT	Amad 52'; Pritchard 58'; Gooch (yellow card) 73'; Simms 90+3'	Report	Saville (yellow card) 22'; Honeyman (yellow card) 34'; Mitchell (yellow card) 41'	Stadium: Stadium of Light; Attendance: 37,012 (884 away); Referee: Tim Robinson
Note: Match was postponed due to the Death of Queen Elizabeth II.

12 December 2022 22	Sunderland	1–2	West Bromwich Albion	Sunderland
20:00 GMT	Amad 19' (pen.); Batth (yellow card) 33'	Report	Rogic 70'; Wallace (yellow card) 71'; Dike 82'	Stadium: Stadium of Light; Attendance: 37,432 (508 away); Referee: James Linington

17 December 2022 23	Hull City	1–1	Sunderland	Kingston upon Hull
15:00 GMT	Greaves (yellow card) 36'; Estupiñán (penalty missed) 49'; Tufan 82'	Report	Embleton (red card) 59'; Stewart 74'; Gooch (yellow card) 90+3'	Stadium: MKM Stadium; Attendance: 18,120 (2,500 away); Referee: Gavin Ward

26 December 2022 24	Sunderland	2–1	Blackburn Rovers	Sunderland
12:30 GMT	Stewart 22' (pen.); Cirkin (yellow card) 20'; Hume (yellow card) 60'; Simms 90+1'; Amad (yellow card) 90+4'	Report	Stewart 18' (o.g.); Morton (yellow card) 25'; Ayala (yellow card) 52'; Buckley (yellow card) 87'; Hirst (yellow card) 90'; Rankin-Costello (yellow card) 90+4'	Stadium: Stadium of Light; Attendance: 43,921 (1,500 away); Referee: Darren Bond

29 December 2022 25	Wigan Athletic	1–4	Sunderland	Wigan
19:45 GMT	McClean (yellow card) 11'; Keane 42'; Tilt (yellow card) 61'	Report	Simms 19'; Ballard (yellow card) 59'; Stewart 66' (pen.); Roberts 85'; Amad 89'	Stadium: DW Stadium; Attendance: 14,615 (4,445 away); Referee: Michael Salisbury

1 January 2023 26	Blackpool	1–1	Sunderland	Blackpool
15:00 GMT	Connolly (yellow card) 8' (yellow-red card) 90+2'; Lavery 21' (yellow card) 71'; Poveda (yellow card) 28'; Beesley (yellow card) 85'	Report	Michut (yellow card) 19'; Stewart 66'; O'Nien (yellow card) 72'	Stadium: Bloomfield Road; Attendance: 14,117 (3,600 away); Referee: Tim Robinson

14 January 2023 27	Sunderland	1–3	Swansea City	Sunderland
15:00 GMT	O'Nien (red card) 18'; Neil 65'; Hume (yellow card) 90+2'	Report	Cabango (yellow card) 19'; Piroe 50' (yellow card) 53'; Latibeaudiere (yellow card) 62'; Cullen 70'; Cooper 78'; Sorinola (yellow card) 88'	Stadium: Stadium of Light; Attendance: 40,001 (420 away); Referee: Keith Stroud

22 January 2023 28	Sunderland	2–0	Middlesbrough	Sunderland
12:00 GMT	Stewart (penalty missed) 51', 51'; Amad 81'	Report	Howson (yellow card) 16'; Fry (red card) 49'; Forss (yellow card) 50'	Stadium: Stadium of Light; Attendance: 42,584 (1,990 away); Referee: James Linington

4 February 2023 29	Millwall	1–1	Sunderland	Bermondsey
15:00 GMT	Cooper (yellow card) 32' (goal) 59'; Bennett (yellow card) 59'; Saville (yellow card) 81'	Report	Hume (yellow card) 52'; Cirkin 81'	Stadium: The Den; Attendance: 18,524 (2,800 away); Referee: Thomas Bramall

11 February 2023 30	Sunderland	1–0	Reading	Sunderland
15:00 GMT	Roberts 84'	Report	Yiadom (yellow card) 33'; Méïté (yellow card) 90+2'	Stadium: Stadium of Light; Attendance: 38,046 (634 away); Referee: David Coote

14 February 2023 31	Queens Park Rangers	0–3	Sunderland	Shepherd's Bush
19:45 GMT	Field (yellow card) 63'; Chair (penalty missed) 67'; Lowe (yellow card) 71'; Dozzell (yellow card) 72'; Johansen (yellow card) 82'; Paal (yellow card) 89'; Dunne (yellow card) 90+1'	Report	O'Nien 34'; Clarke (yellow card) 69' (goal) 82', 90+2'; Roberts (yellow card) 90+1'	Stadium: Loftus Road; Attendance: 14,471 (2,621 away); Referee: Peter Bankes

18 February 2023 32	Sunderland	1–1	Bristol City	Sunderland
15:00 GMT	Clarke 59'; O'Nien (yellow card) 82'	Report	Wells 90+3' (pen.)	Stadium: Stadium of Light; Attendance: 38,685 (1,100 away); Referee: Gavin Ward

21 February 2023 33	Rotherham United	2–1	Sunderland	Rotherham
19:45 GMT	Rathbone 19'; Hugill (yellow card) 37'; Ferguson 56'; Coventry (yellow card) 82'	Report	Cirkin (yellow card) 40'; Gelhardt 61'	Stadium: AESSEAL New York Stadium; Attendance: 10,522 (2,200 away); Referee: Chris Kavanagh

25 February 2023 34	Coventry City	2–1	Sunderland	Coventry
15:00 GMT	Allen 25'; Palmer (yellow card) 39'; Eccles (yellow card) 45+2'; Wilson (yellow card) 86'; Gyökeres 89'	Report	Neil (yellow card) 23'; Amad (yellow card) 45+2', (goal) 90+4'	Stadium: CBS Arena; Attendance: 21,437 (3,000 away); Referee: Dean Whitestone

4 March 2023 35	Sunderland	1–5	Stoke City	Sunderland
15:00 GMT	Neil (yellow card) 21'; Pritchard 62'	Report	Laurent 41'; Pearson (yellow card) 45+1'; Laurent (yellow card) 52'; Campbell 53', 57'; Gayle 68', 76'	Stadium: Stadium of Light; Attendance: 43,064 (1,200 away); Referee: Jeremy Simpson

12 March 2023 36	Norwich City	0–1	Sunderland	Norwich
12:00 GMT	Pukki (yellow card) 32'; Núñez (yellow card) 50'	Report	Ba 15'; Neil (yellow card) 63'; Hume (yellow card) 64'; Batth (yellow card) 71'; Gooch (yellow card) 85'; Ekwah (yellow card) 90+1'	Stadium: Carrow Road; Attendance: 26,728 (1,900 away); Referee: Tim Robinson

15 March 2023 37	Sunderland	1–2	Sheffield United	Sunderland
19:45 GMT	Hume (yellow card) 27'; Michut 30' (yellow card) 71'; Ballard (yellow card) 90+4'	Report	Robinson (yellow card) 20'; Lowe (yellow card) 24'; Doyle (yellow card) 35' (goal) 61'; McAtee 45+1'; Ahmedhodzic (yellow card) 55'	Stadium: Stadium of Light; Attendance: 37,490 (1,700 away); Referee: Matt Donohue

18 March 2023 38	Sunderland	1–1	Luton Town	Sunderland
15:00 GMT	Amad 86' (pen.)	Report	Lockyer (yellow card) 31'; Doughty 51'; Woodrow (yellow card) 81'; Adebayo (yellow card) 81'; Morris (yellow card) 90+1'	Stadium: Stadium of Light; Attendance: 37,579 (900 away); Referee: Scott Oldham

31 March 2023 39	Burnley	0–0	Sunderland	Burnley
20:00 BST	Cullen (yellow card) 53'; Maatsen (yellow card) 58'	Report		Stadium: Turf Moor; Attendance: 21,462 (2,300 away); Referee: Jarred Gillett

7 April 2023 40	Sunderland	4–4	Hull City	Sunderland
17:30 BST	Gelhardt 21'; Amad 22', 73' (pen.); Clarke 81'	Report	Tufan 11', 90+8' (pen.); Sayyadmanesh 25' (yellow card) 34'; Slater 66'; Elder (yellow card) 83'	Stadium: Stadium of Light; Attendance: 40,677 (1,895 away); Referee: Keith Stroud

10 April 2023 41	Cardiff City	0–1	Sunderland	Cardiff
15:00 BST	Ng (yellow card) 59'; Kipré (yellow card) 75'; Etete (yellow card) 76'; Rinomhota (yellow card) 81'	Report	Cirkin 60'; Neil (yellow card) 84'	Stadium: Cardiff City Stadium; Attendance: 23,365 (2,695 away); Referee: Thomas Bramall

15 April 2023 42	Sunderland	2–1	Birmingham City	Sunderland
15:00 BST	Cirkin (yellow card) 16' (yellow-red card) 78'; Hume 45+3'; Amad 75'	Report	Hall 29'; Colin (yellow card) 70'	Stadium: Stadium of Light; Attendance: 39,659 (1,895 away); Referee: Stephen Martin

18 April 2023 43	Sunderland	1–1	Huddersfield Town	Sunderland
19:45 BST	Neil (yellow card) 14'; Gelhardt 35'; Batth (yellow card) 87'; Clarke (yellow card) 90+3'	Report	Headley (yellow card) 47'; Koroma 59'; Kasumu (yellow card) 67'	Stadium: Stadium of Light; Attendance: 37,065 (850 away); Referee: Leigh Doughty

22 April 2023 43	West Bromwich Albion	1–2	Sunderland	West Bromwich
12:00 BST	Molumby (yellow card) 24'; Yokuşlu (yellow card) 37'; Swift 45+1' (pen.), (yellow card) 50'	Report	Cirkin 51', 84'; Gelhardt (yellow card) 70'; O'Nien (yellow card) 78'; Gooch (yellow card) 82'	Stadium: The Hawthorns; Attendance: 24,764 (2,200 away); Referee: John Busby

29 April 2023 45	Sunderland	2–2	Watford	Sunderland
15:00 BST	Clarke (yellow card) 65'; O'Nien 70', (yellow card) 78'; Amad (yellow card) 84'; Roberts 90+5'	Report	Choudhury (yellow card) 10'; Kabasele 17'; Porteous (yellow card) 19', (goal) 69'; Davis (yellow card) 65'	Stadium: Stadium of Light; Attendance: 44,944 (473 away); Referee: Gavin Ward

6 May 2023 46	Preston North End	0–3	Sunderland	Preston
15:00 BST	Storey (yellow card) 4'; Ledson (yellow card) 84'	Report	Amad 54'; Pritchard 61'; Clarke 65'	Stadium: Deepdale; Attendance: 21,177 (5,714 away); Referee: Bobby Madley

==== Play-offs ====
Sunderland finished 6th in the regular 2022–23 EFL Championship season, so were drawn against 3rd placed Luton Town in the Play-off Semi Final. The first leg took place at the Stadium of Light and the second leg took place at Kenilworth Road.

13 May 2023 Semi-final, First leg	Sunderland	2–1	Luton Town	Sunderland
17:30 BST	Neil (yellow card) 16'; O'Nien (yellow card) 30'; Amad 39', (yellow card) 84'; Hume 63'	Report	Adebayo 11'; Nakamba (yellow card) 29'; Mpanzu (yellow card) 38'; Doughty (yellow card) 73'; Clark (yellow card) 77'	Stadium: Stadium of Light; Attendance: 46,060; Referee: Tim Robinson

16 May 2023 Semi-final, Second leg	Luton Town	2–0 (3–2 agg.)	Sunderland	Luton
20:00 BST	Osho 10'; Clark (yellow card) 18'; Lockyer 43'; Ruddock (yellow card) 90+4'	Report	O'Nien (yellow card) 30'; Alese (yellow card) 90+5'	Stadium: Kenilworth Road; Attendance: 10,013; Referee: Simon Hooper

=== FA Cup ===
The Black Cats were drawn away to Shrewsbury Town in the third round and to Fulham in the fourth round.

7 January 2023 Third round	Shrewsbury Town	1–2	Sunderland	Shrewsbury
15:00 GMT	Pennington 81'; Shipley (yellow card) 90'	Report	Roberts (yellow card) 20'; Stewart 90+2'; O'Nien 90+4'	Stadium: Montgomery Waters Meadow; Attendance: 6,309 (1,600 away); Referee: Matt Donohue

28 January 2023 Fourth round	Fulham	1–1	Sunderland	Fulham
15:00 GMT	Wilson (yellow card) 45+4'; Cairney 61'; Kurzawa (yellow card) 63'	Report	Clarke 6'; Alese (yellow card) 43'; Batth (yellow card) 75'	Stadium: Craven Cottage; Attendance: 22,905 (6,112 away); Referee: Michael Salisbury

8 February 2023 Fourth round replay	Sunderland	2–3	Fulham	Sunderland
19:45 GMT	Clarke 77'; Bennette 90'	Report	Wilson 8'; Duffy (yellow card) 55'; Pereira 59'; Kurzawa 82'	Stadium: Stadium of Light; Attendance: 29,651 (430 away); Referee: Tim Robinson

=== EFL Cup ===
Sunderland were drawn away to Sheffield Wednesday in the first round.

10 August 2022 First round	Sheffield Wednesday	2–0	Sunderland	Owlerton
19:45 BST	Adeniran 16'; Sow 56'; Bakinson (yellow card) 68'	Report	Winchester (yellow card) 11'	Stadium: Hillsborough Stadium; Attendance: 8,412; Referee: Tom Reeves

== Player statistics ==
=== Appearance summary ===
As of match(es) played on 20 March 2023

No.	Pos	Nat	Player	Total		Championship		FA Cup		EFL Cup	
No.	Pos	Nat	Player	Apps	Goals	Apps	Goals	Apps	Goals	Apps	Goals
Goalkeepers
1	GK	(England) ENG	Anthony Patterson	40	0	38+0	0	2+0	0	0+0	0
12	GK	(England) ENG	Alex Bass	2	0	0+0	0	1+0	0	1+0	0
Defenders
2	DF	(Wales) WAL	Niall Huggins	2	0	1+0	0	0+1	0	0+0	0
3	DF	(England) ENG	Dennis Cirkin	22	2	16+6	2	0+0	0	0+0	0
5	DF	(Northern Ireland) NIR	Daniel Ballard	22	0	18+1	0	3+0	0	0+0	0
6	DF	(England) ENG	Danny Batth	37	0	34+1	0	2+0	0	0+0	0
26	DF	(Australia) AUS	Bailey Wright	16	0	6+8	0	1+0	0	1+0	0
32	DF	(Northern Ireland) NIR	Trai Hume	24	0	15+5	0	3+0	0	1+0	0
42	DF	(England) ENG	Aji Alese	23	1	17+3	1	2+0	0	1+0	0
45	DF	(England) ENG	Joe Anderson	1	0	0+1	0	0+0	0	0+0	0
Midfielders
4	MF	(Northern Ireland) NIR	Corry Evans	24	0	22+2	0	0+0	0	0+0	0
7	MF	(Germany) GER	Leon Dajaku	9	0	2+7	0	0+0	0	0+0	0
8	MF	(England) ENG	Elliot Embleton	24	2	13+10	2	0+0	0	1+0	0
10	MF	(England) ENG	Patrick Roberts	38	4	23+11	4	3+0	0	1+0	0
11	MF	(United States) USA	Lynden Gooch	22	1	19+3	1	0+0	0	0+0	0
13	MF	(England) ENG	Luke O'Nien	37	2	28+6	1	1+1	1	1+0	0
15	MF	(Northern Ireland) NIR	Carl Winchester	1	0	0+0	0	0+0	0	1+0	0
16	MF	(Ivory Coast) CIV	Amad	37	13	34	13	3+0	0	0+0	0
17	MF	(France) FRA	Abdoullah Ba	25	1	6+16	1	2+1	0	0+0	0
19	MF	(Costa Rica) CRC	Jewison Bennette	18	2	0+15	1	1+2	1	0+0	0
20	MF	(England) ENG	Jack Clarke	40	9	36+1	7	2+1	2	0+0	0
21	MF	(England) ENG	Alex Pritchard	33	2	24+8	2	0+1	0	0+0	0
22	MF	(France) FRA	Isaac Lihadji	3	0	0+3	0	0+0	0	0+0	0
23	MF	(England) ENG	Jack Diamond	2	0	0+1	0	0+0	0	1+0	0
24	MF	(England) ENG	Dan Neil	40	2	35+2	2	3+0	0	0+0	0
25	MF	(France) FRA	Edouard Michut	20	1	10+7	1	3+0	0	0+0	0
27	MF	(England) ENG	Jay Matete	9	0	1+7	0	0+0	0	1+0	0
29	MF	(England) ENG	Harrison Sohna	1	0	0+0	0	0+0	0	1+0	0
31	MF	(England) ENG	Chris Rigg	3	0	0+0	0	0+3	0	0+0	0
33	MF	(England) ENG	Michael Spellman	1	0	0+0	0	0+0	0	0+1	0
34	MF	(England) ENG	Caden Kelly	1	0	0+0	0	0+0	0	0+1	0
39	MF	(France) FRA	Pierre Ekwah	9	0	0+7	0	0+2	0	0+0	0
Forwards
9	FW	(England) ENG	Ellis Simms	17	7	14+3	7	0+0	0	0+0	0
14	FW	(Scotland) SCO	Ross Stewart	15	11	12+1	10	1+1	1	0+0	0
28	FW	(England) ENG	Joe Gelhardt	10	1	10+0	1	0+0	0	0+0	0

=== Goals record ===
As of match(es) played on 20 March 2023

Rank	No.	Nat.	Po.	Name	Championship	FA Cup	EFL Cup	Total
1	16	(Ivory Coast)	RW	Amad	13	0	0	13
2	14	(Scotland)	ST	Ross Stewart	10	1	0	11
2	20	(England)	LW	Jack Clarke	7	2	0	9
3	9	(England)	ST	Ellis Simms	7	0	0	7
4	10	(England)	RW	Patrick Roberts	4	0	0	4
5	21	(England)	AM	Alex Pritchard	3	0	0	3
6	3	(England)	LB	Dennis Cirkin	2	0	0	2
6	8	(England)	AM	Elliot Embleton	2	0	0	2
6	13	(England)	CM	Luke O'Nien	1	1	0	2
6	19	(Costa Rica)	LW	Jewison Bennette	1	1	0	2
6	24	(England)	CM	Dan Neil	2	0	0	2
7	11	(United States)	AM	Lynden Gooch	1	0	0	1
7	17	(France)	CM	Abdoullah Ba	1	0	0	1
7	25	(France)	CM	Edouard Michut	1	0	0	1
7	28	(England)	ST	Joe Gelhardt	1	0	0	1
7	42	(England)	CB	Aji Alese	1	0	0	1
Total					53	5	0	58

=== Penalties record ===
As of match(es) played on 20 March 2023

Excludes penalties taken during Penalty shoot-outs.

Rank	No.	Nat.	Po.	Name	Championship		FA Cup		EFL Cup		Total		Conversion Ratio
Rank	No.	Nat.	Po.	Name	Scored	Missed	Scored	Missed	Scored	Missed	Scored	Missed	Conversion Ratio
1	14	(Scotland)	ST	Ross Stewart	2	1	0	0	0	0	2	1	67%
1	16	(Ivory Coast)	RW	Amad	2	0	0	0	0	0	2	0	100%
Total					4	1	0	0	0	0	4	1	80%

=== Assists record ===
As of match(es) played on 20 March 2023

Rank	No.	Nat.	Po.	Name	Championship	FA Cup	EFL Cup	Total
1	20	(England)	LW	Jack Clarke	6	1	0	7
2	10	(England)	RW	Patrick Roberts	5	0	0	5
3	21	(England)	AM	Alex Pritchard	4	0	0	4
3	24	(England)	CM	Dan Neil	4	0	0	4
4	14	(Scotland)	ST	Ross Stewart	3	0	0	3
4	16	(Ivory Coast)	RW	Amad	3	1	0	4
5	8	(England)	AM	Elliot Embleton	2	0	0	2
5	9	(England)	ST	Ellis Simms	2	0	0	2
5	11	(United States)	AM	Lynden Gooch	2	0	0	2
5	28	(England)	ST	Joe Gelhardt	2	0	0	2
5	32	(Northern Ireland)	RB	Trai Hume	2	0	0	2
6	1	(England)	GK	Anthony Patterson	1	0	0	1
6	3	(England)	LB	Dennis Cirkin	1	0	0	1
6	5	(Northern Ireland)	CB	Daniel Ballard	1	0	0	1
6	6	(England)	CB	Danny Batth	1	0	0	1
6	13	(England)	CM	Luke O'Nien	1	0	0	1
6	17	(France)	CM	Abdoullah Ba	1	0	0	1
6	19	(Costa Rica)	LW	Jewison Bennette	1	0	0	1
6	42	(England)	CB	Aji Alese	0	1	0	1
Total					41	3	0	44

=== Disciplinary record ===
As of match(es) played on 20 March 2023

Rank	No.	Nat.	Po.	Name	Championship			FA Cup			EFL Cup			Total		
Rank	No.	Nat.	Po.	Name	Yellow card	(yellow card) (yellow-red card)	Red card	Yellow card	(yellow card) (yellow-red card)	Red card	Yellow card	(yellow card) (yellow-red card)	Red card	Yellow card	(yellow card) (yellow-red card)	Red card
1	13	(England)	CM	Luke O'Nien	7	0	1	0	0	0	0	0	0	7	0	1
2	4	(Northern Ireland)	CM	Corry Evans	7	0	0	0	0	0	0	0	0	7	0	0
2	20	(England)	LW	Jack Clarke	7	0	0	0	0	0	0	0	0	7	0	0
3	3	(England)	LB	Dennis Cirkin	6	0	0	0	0	0	0	0	0	6	0	0
3	6	(England)	CB	Danny Batth	5	0	0	1	0	0	0	0	0	6	0	0
3	11	(United States)	AM	Lynden Gooch	6	0	0	0	0	0	0	0	0	6	0	0
3	24	(England)	CM	Dan Neil	5	0	1	0	0	0	0	0	0	5	0	1
4	8	(England)	AM	Elliot Embleton	4	0	1	0	0	0	0	0	0	4	0	1
4	32	(Northern Ireland)	RB	Trai Hume	5	0	0	0	0	0	0	0	0	5	0	0
5	10	(England)	RW	Patrick Roberts	3	0	0	1	0	0	0	0	0	4	0	0
5	21	(England)	AM	Alex Pritchard	4	0	0	0	0	0	0	0	0	4	0	0
5	27	(England)	CM	Jay Matete	4	0	0	0	0	0	0	0	0	4	0	0
6	5	(Northern Ireland)	CB	Daniel Ballard	3	0	0	0	0	0	0	0	0	3	0	0
6	25	(France)	CM	Edouard Michut	3	0	0	0	0	0	0	0	0	3	0	0
7	16	(Ivory Coast)	RW	Amad	2	0	0	0	0	0	0	0	0	2	0	0
7	19	(Costa Rica)	LW	Jewison Bennette	2	0	0	0	0	0	0	0	0	2	0	0
7	26	(Australia)	CB	Bailey Wright	2	0	0	0	0	0	0	0	0	2	0	0
7	42	(England)	CB	Aji Alese	1	0	0	1	0	0	0	0	0	2	0	0
8	1	(England)	GK	Anthony Patterson	1	0	0	0	0	0	0	0	0	1	0	0
8	2	(Wales)	RB	Niall Huggins	1	0	0	0	0	0	0	0	0	1	0	0
8	15	(Northern Ireland)	CM	Carl Winchester	0	0	0	0	0	0	1	0	0	1	0	0
8	17	(France)	CM	Abdoullah Ba	1	0	0	0	0	0	0	0	0	1	0	0
8	39	(France)	CM	Pierre Ekwah	1	0	0	0	0	0	0	0	0	1	0	0
Total					80	0	3	2	0	0	1	0	0	83	0	3
