= David Haggerty =

David Haggerty might refer to:

- David Haggerty (footballer) (born 1991), English footballer
- David Haggerty (tennis) (born 1950s), American tennis administrator
