= Amad Diallo =

Ivorian footballer (born 2002)

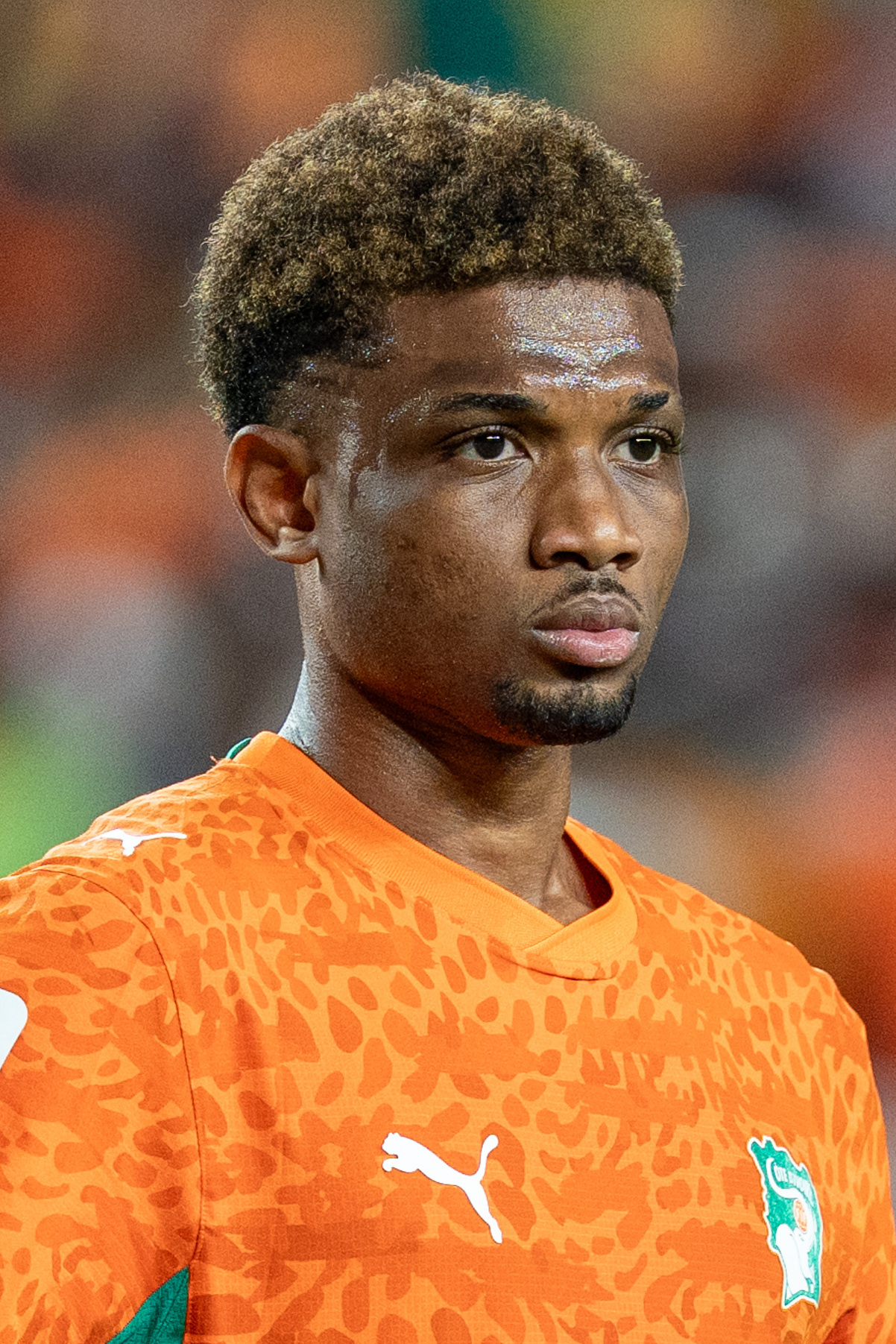
- Amad with the Ivory Coast in 2026

Personal information
- Full name: Amad Diallo
- Birth name: Amad Diallo Traoré
- Date of birth: 11 July 2002 (age 24)
- Place of birth: Abidjan, Ivory Coast
- Height: 1.73 m (5 ft 8 in)
- Positions: Winger; attacking midfielder

Team information
- Current team: Manchester United
- Number: 16

Youth career
- 2014–2015: Boca Barco
- 2015–2019: Atalanta

Senior career*
Years	Team	Apps	(Gls)
2019–2021	Atalanta	4	(1)
2021–	Manchester United	75	(11)
2022	→ Rangers (loan)	10	(3)
2022–2023	→ Sunderland (loan)	37	(13)

International career^{‡}
2021	Ivory Coast U23	4	(0)
2021–	Ivory Coast	25	(8)
- * Club domestic league appearances and goals as of 08:14, 14 November 2026 (UTC) ‡ National team caps and goals as of 21:23, 20 November 2026 (UTC)

Amad Diallo (born 11 July 2002), sometimes known mononymously as Amad, is an Ivorian professional footballer who plays as a winger or attacking midfielder for Premier League club Manchester United and the Ivory Coast national team.

Born in the Ivory Coast, Amad moved to Italy as a child. He joined the Atalanta youth system in 2015, where he won two Campionato Primavera 1 titles. In 2019, he scored on his debut for the senior team. In January 2021, Amad joined Manchester United, where he has made more than 100 appearances and had loan spells at Rangers and Sunderland.

Amad made his senior international debut for the Ivory Coast in March 2021, in a 2021 Africa Cup of Nations qualification game. He represented the Ivory Coast at the 2025 Africa Cup of Nations and the 2026 FIFA World Cup.

== Early life ==
Born in Abidjan, Ivory Coast, Amad emigrated to Italy aged eight. He began playing football for Boca Barco, in Bibbiano, in September 2014, where he impressed at a Christmas youth tournament the same year; he was the tournament's top goalscorer as the youngest on the field. Amad was officially registered to the team on 14 January 2015.

== Club career ==
=== Atalanta ===
==== 2015–2020: Youth ====
With a number of Serie A clubs being interested in him while at Boca Barco, Amad moved to Atalanta in 2015. While initially starting with the under-14s during the 2015–16 season, Amad quickly moved to the under-15 team. He played in the Final Eight, scoring against Roma in the final and helping his side win the league title.

During the 2016–17 season, he played for the under-15 side before moving to the under-17s in 2017–18, where he scored 12 goals in 27 appearances. In 2018–19, Amad scored 12 goals and made seven assists in 16 under-17 games, and six goals and six assists in 26 games in the Campionato Primavera 1, the under-19 championship. He won the 2018–19 season with Atalanta.

In 2019, Amad won the Supercoppa Primavera, providing both assists in a 2–1 win over Fiorentina. He scored six goals and made six assists in 25 league games, helping Atalanta win the Campionato Primavera 1 in 2019–20 for a second successive season.

==== 2019–2021: Senior ====
Amad made his Serie A debut on 27 October 2019, coming on as a 79th-minute substitute against Udinese, and scored his first goal four minutes later in a 7–1 home win. He became the first player born in 2002 to score in the Italian top flight. His first UEFA Champions League call-up came on 11 December 2019, as an unused substitute in a 3–0 away win against Shakhtar Donetsk.

Amad's first league game in the 2020–21 season was on 28 November 2020, as a 77th-minute substitute against Hellas Verona; Atalanta lost 2–0 at home. Amad made his Champions League debut on 1 December, after being subbed on in the 68th minute against Midtjylland in a 1–1 home draw.

=== Manchester United ===
==== 2020–21: Debut season ====
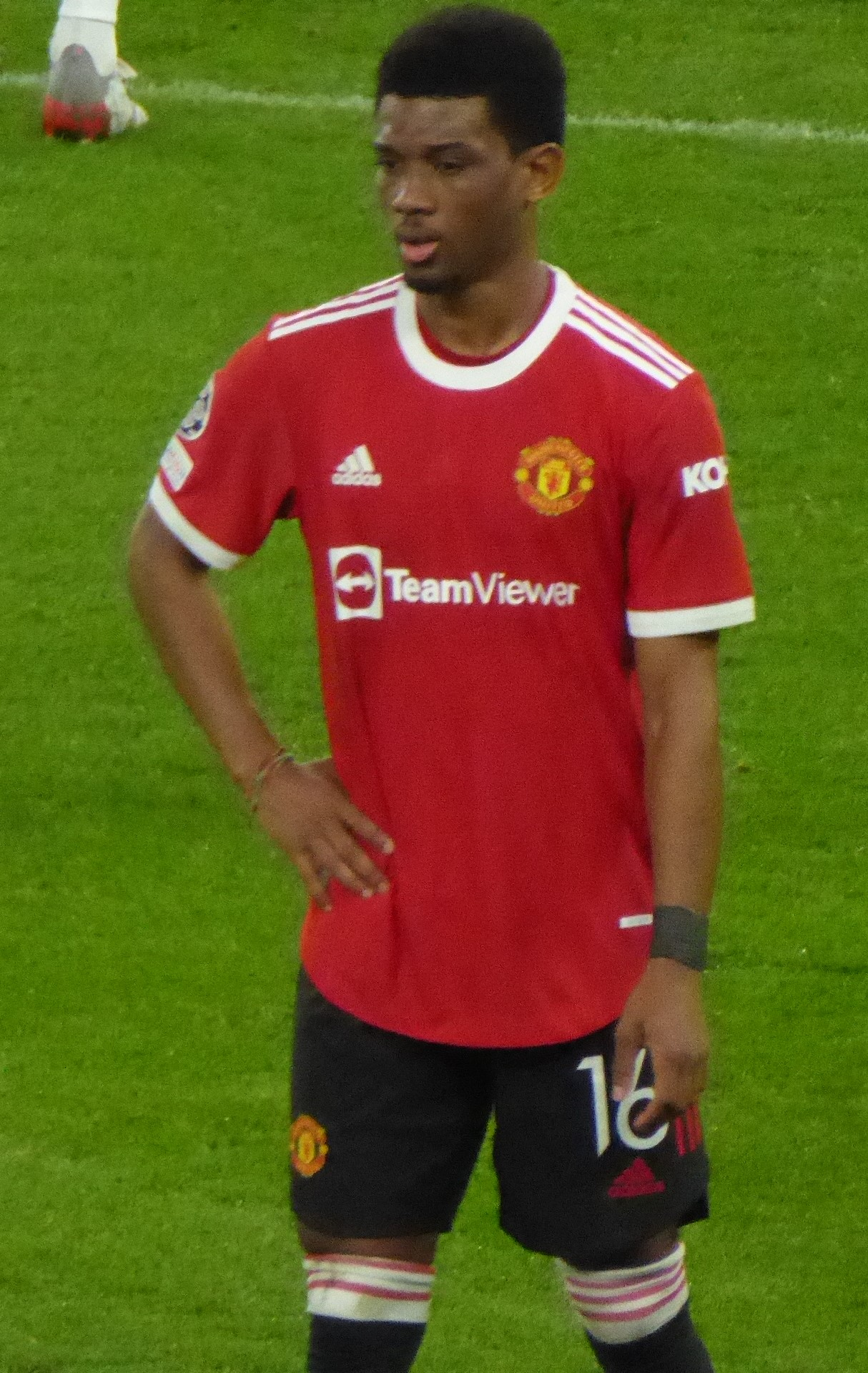
Amad playing for Manchester United in 2021

On 5 October 2020, Manchester United agreed to sign Amad in January 2021, pending the agreement of personal terms, passing a medical and the issue of a work permit. The reported fee was of €21.3 million – €37 million including bonuses. Amad officially joined on 7 January 2021, on a five-year contract with the option of an extra year.

Amad scored a brace on his debut for the Under-23s, in a 6–3 win over Liverpool on 30 January. He was first called up to the senior team on 9 February, as an unused substitute in an FA Cup fifth round match against West Ham United, which ended in a 1–0 Manchester United win after extra time. On 18 February, Amad made his first-team debut for United as a substitute for Mason Greenwood in a 4–0 away win over Real Sociedad in the first leg of the Europa League round of 32 tie. His first goal for United came on 11 March, in a 1–1 home draw against AC Milan in the first leg of the Europa League round of 16 tie.

On 11 May, Amad made his league debut against Leicester City, assisting Greenwood's goal in a 2–1 defeat; the goal was the first time in 15 years a teenager assisted another for a Premier League goal.

Amad played his first game of the 2021–22 season on 8 December 2021, starting the UEFA Champions League group stage match against Young Boys.

==== 2022–23: Loans to Rangers and Sunderland ====
Amad was loaned to Scottish Premiership club Rangers on 27 January 2022, for the remainder of the season. He made his debut on 29 January, scoring the opener of the game as a starter in a 3–3 away draw to Ross County.

On 31 August 2022, Amad joined Sunderland in the EFL Championship on a season-long loan. He scored his first goal for Sunderland on 22 October, in a 4–2 home defeat to Burnley. With three goals in five games in December, Amad won the EFL Young Player of the Month award. Amad finished the season with 14 goals and 4 assists across all competitions, which made him Sunderland's top goal scorer that season, including a free kick from 25 yards in the play-off semi-final against Luton Town.

==== 2023–24: Breakthrough season at Manchester United ====
Amad played his first game for United in over two seasons on 30 December 2023, as a substitute in the 2–1 league defeat away to Nottingham Forest. On 17 March 2024, Amad scored the winning goal in the last minute of extra time in a 4–3 win against Liverpool in the 2023–24 FA Cup quarter-finals; he received a second yellow card and was sent off after taking his shirt off in celebration. Amad's first Premier League goal came on 15 May, scoring United's second goal in a 3–2 victory against Newcastle United.

==== 2024–25: Manchester United regular ====
Following the dismissal of Erik ten Hag, Amad saw regular playing opportunities, first under interim manager Ruud van Nistelrooy, then head coach Ruben Amorim. On 7 November, in Van Nistelrooy's penultimate game in charge, Amad scored his first brace for the club in a 2–0 win against PAOK in the UEFA Europa League. On 24 November 2024, he started as a wing-back in Amorim's first match against Ipswich Town which ended in a 1–1 draw. He assisted Marcus Rashford's opening goal in the second minute. On 15 December, he started as an attacking midfielder away to local rivals and reigning champions Manchester City, where he won a late penalty that Bruno Fernandes converted to equalise, then scored the winning goal in the final minutes in their 2–1 victory. His winning goal in that match was later voted Manchester United's goal of the season.

On 5 January 2025, he scored a late equaliser in a 2–2 draw against Liverpool at Anfield. On 9 January, he signed a new contract until 2030. On 12 January, Amad made his 50th appearance for United, coming on as a substitute in their FA Cup third round match against Arsenal, which ended in a 1–1 draw after extra time. He scored United's second penalty in the shoot-out, which they won 5–3. On 16 January, Amad scored his first senior hat-trick in 12 minutes against Southampton in a 3–1 victory, helping Manchester United to come from behind in the second-half. He became the first Manchester United player to score a hat-trick since Cristiano Ronaldo against Norwich City in April 2022.

On 15 February 2025, Amorim confirmed that Amad had damaged his ankle ligaments in training, and was out for the remainder of the 2024–25 season. He returned to training two months later, on 30 April 2025. He played his first match after his injury against Brentford and scored in a 4–3 defeat. On 21 May 2025, Amad featured in the 2025 UEFA Europa League final as a starter, losing to Tottenham Hotspur; consequently, he equalled the record of losing in three UEFA Europa League finals, alongside Nemanja Matic, Artur Moraes and Lima, though he did not play in the first two instances.

== International career ==
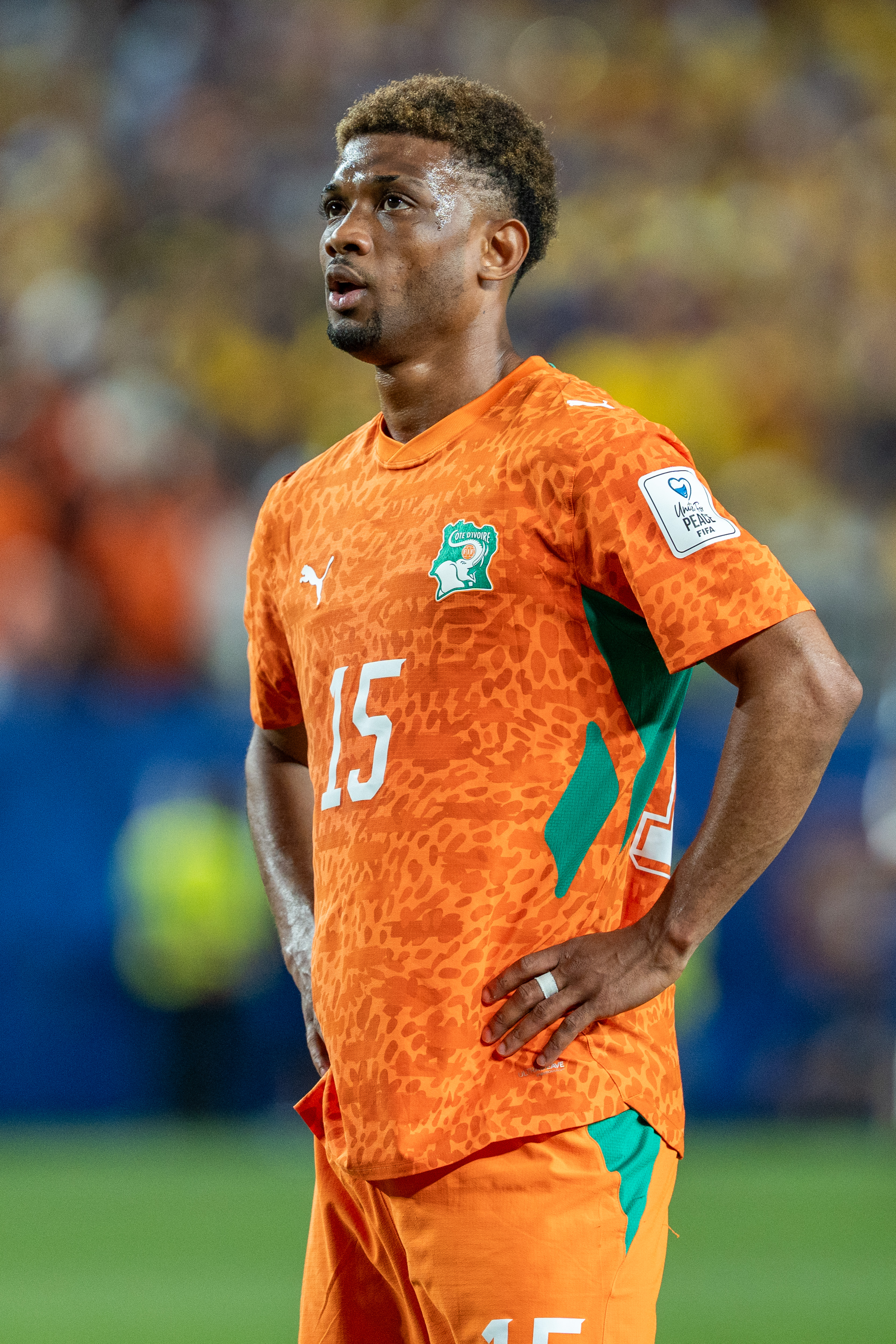
Amad playing for the Ivory Coast at the 2026 FIFA World Cup

Amad was first called up to the Ivory Coast national team on 18 March 2021 for their 2021 Africa Cup of Nations qualification matches against Niger and Ethiopia on 26 and 30 March, respectively. He made his debut against Niger, coming on as an 86th-minute substitute. On 5 June 2021, Amad scored his first international goal in a friendly against Burkina Faso, through a 97th-minute free kick, to help his team win 2–1 at home.

On 3 July 2021, Amad was named in the Ivory Coast under-23 team for the 2020 Summer Olympics. Amad made his Olympics debut, and assisted a goal, in a 2–1 win against Saudi Arabia on 22 July. He made four appearances at the tournament.

Amad was included in the list of Ivorian players selected by coach Emerse Faé to participate in the 2025 Africa Cup of Nations. He scored three goals from five matches at the tournament as the team reached the quarter-final stage.

On 15 May 2026, Amad was named in the Ivory Coast's 26-man squad for the 2026 FIFA World Cup. He scored a 90th minute game-winning goal with a left-footed strike from inside the box to seal a 1–0 win in Ivory Coast's opening match against Ecuador on 14 June. On 30 June, he scored a goal in their round of 32 match against Norway, which saw his team eliminated after a 2–1 defeat.

== Style of play ==
Amad is a winger who also plays as a mezzala, he is a player with a high technical ability and good vision of the game. He is two-footed, which makes him a versatile player. He is known for creating opportunities and cutting inside from the right flank, occasionally playing as a right wing-back under Ruben Amorim.

Amad possesses quick acceleration and dribbling skills, often dribbling using small touches on the ball and taking on defenders rather than bursting into space. He is known to perform back-heel passes and other tricks.

== Legal issues ==
In July 2020, an investigation into the trafficking of football players was launched by the public prosecutor's office of Parma. Among the involved was Hamed Mamadou Traoré, a distant relative of Amad and his alleged brother Hamed Traorè, who was accused of posing as their father to facilitate their immigration into Italy. The investigation also questioned the relationship between Amad and Hamed.

On 9 February 2021, Amad was found guilty of violating the Italian Sports Justice Code to join the football club "ASD Boca Barco" in 2015 under the name "Diallo Amad Traoré". He was accused of falsifying documents to fake a relationship with Hamed Mamadou Traoré, an Ivorian citizen resident in Italy, and request a family reunification. Amad requested a plea bargain, with the Federal Prosecutor's Office imposing a fine of €48,000.

== Personal life ==
On 11 July 2020, the day of his 18th birthday, Amad changed his Instagram name from "Amad Traoré" to "Amad Diallo", with a caption reading "don't call me Traoré anymore". In September 2020, his name was legally changed to Amad Diallo.

Diallo received his Italian passport in December 2020.

Diallo is a Muslim.

== Career statistics ==
=== Club ===
As of match played 8 November 2026

Appearances and goals by club, season and competition
Club	Season	League			National cup (Note: Includes Coppa Italia, FA Cup, Scottish Cup)		League cup (Note: Includes EFL Cup)		Europe		Other		Total	
Club	Season	Division	Apps	Goals	Apps	Goals	Apps	Goals	Apps	Goals	Apps	Goals	Apps	Goals
Atalanta	2019–20	Serie A	3	1	0	0	—		0	0	—		3	1
Atalanta	2020–21	Serie A	1	0	—		—		1 (Note: Appearance(s) in UEFA Champions League)	0	—		2	0
Atalanta	Total		4	1	0	0	—		1	0	—		5	1
Manchester United	2020–21	Premier League	3	0	1	0	—		4 (Note: Appearances in UEFA Europa League)	1	—		8	1
Manchester United	2021–22	Premier League	0	0	0	0	0	0	1	0	—		1	0
Manchester United	2022–23	Premier League	0	0	0	0	0	0	0	0	—		0	0
Manchester United	2023–24	Premier League	9	1	3	1	0	0	0	0	—		12	2
Manchester United	2024–25	Premier League	26	8	2	0	3	1	11	2	1 (Note: Appearance in FA Community Shield)	0	43	11
Manchester United	2025–26	Premier League	32	2	0	0	1	0	—		—		33	2
Manchester United	2026–27	Premier League	5	0	0	0	0	0	3	0	—		8	0
Manchester United	Total		75	11	6	1	4	1	19	3	1	0	105	16
Rangers (loan)	2021–22	Scottish Premiership	10	3	3	0	—		0	0	—		13	3
Sunderland (loan)	2022–23	Championship	37	13	3	0	—		—		2 (Note: Appearances in EFL Championship play-offs)	1	42	14
Career total			126	28	12	1	4	1	20	3	3	1	165	34

=== International ===
As of match played 17 November 2026

Appearances and goals by national team and year
National team	Year	Apps	Goals
Ivory Coast	2021	3	1
Ivory Coast	2022	0	0
Ivory Coast	2023	1	0
Ivory Coast	2024	2	0
Ivory Coast	2025	8	3
Ivory Coast	2026	11	4
Total		25	8

Scores and results list the Ivory Coast's goal tally first, score column indicates score after each Amad goal.

List of international goals scored by Amad Diallo
No.	Date	Venue	Cap	Opponent	Score	Result	Competition
1	5 June 2021	Alassane Ouattara Stadium, Abidjan, Ivory Coast	2	Burkina Faso	2–1	2–1	Friendly
2	14 October 2025	Alassane Ouattara Stadium, Abidjan, Ivory Coast	9	Kenya	3–0	3–0	2026 FIFA World Cup qualification
3	24 December 2025	Marrakesh Stadium, Marrakesh, Morocco	12	Mozambique	1–0	1–0	2025 Africa Cup of Nations
4	28 December 2025	Marrakesh Stadium, Marrakesh, Morocco	13	Cameroon	1–0	1–1	2025 Africa Cup of Nations
5	6 January 2026	Marrakesh Stadium, Marrakesh, Morocco	15	Burkina Faso	1–0	3–0	2025 Africa Cup of Nations
6	4 June 2026	Stade de la Beaujoire, Nantes, France	19	France	2–1	2–1	Friendly
7	14 June 2026	Lincoln Financial Field, Philadelphia, United States	20	Ecuador	1–0	1–0	2026 FIFA World Cup
8	30 June 2026	AT&T Stadium, Arlington, United States	23	Norway	1–1	1–2	2026 FIFA World Cup

== Honours ==
Manchester United

- FA Cup: 2023–24
- UEFA Europa League runner-up: 2020–21, 2024–25

Rangers

- Scottish Cup: 2021–22
- UEFA Europa League runner-up: 2021–22

Individual

- PFA Championship Fans' Player of the Year: 2022–23
- IFFHS CAF Youth Team of the Year: 2020
- Sunderland Young Player of the Year: 2022–23
- BBC Goal of the Month: December 2024
- Manchester United Goal of the Season: 2024–25 (vs. Manchester City, 15 December 2024)
