= Jamie Annerson =

English footballer

Personal information
- Date of birth: 1 November 1988 (age 38)
- Place of birth: Sheffield, England
- Height: 6 ft 2 in (1.88 m)
- Position: Goalkeeper

Youth career
- 2005–2007: Sheffield United

Senior career*
| Years | Team | Apps | (Gls) |
| 2006–2009 | Sheffield United | 0 | (0) |
| 2007 | → Rotherham United (loan) | 0 | (0) |
| 2008 | → Chesterfield (loan) | 0 | (0) |
| 2008 | → Rotherham United (loan) | 0 | (0) |
| 2008 | → Mansfield Town (loan) | 1 | (0) |
| 2009–2012 | Rotherham United | 9 | (0) |
| 2012 | → Bradford City (loan) | 0 | (0) |
| 2013 | Sheffield FC | 0 | (0) |
| Total | | 10 | (0) |

International career^{‡}
| 2007–2008 | England U19 | 4 | (0) |
- * Club domestic league appearances and goals as of 18:16, 29 October 2015 (UTC) ‡ National team caps and goals as of 13:57, 13 March 2008 (UTC)

Jamie Annerson (born 1 November 1988) is an English footballer who plays as a goalkeeper. Born in Sheffield, South Yorkshire, Annerson started his career with Sheffield United in 2006 but never broke into the first team. He moved to Rotherham United in 2009 but was released in 2013 signing for Sheffield FC in September. Annerson has also represented England U19s and has had loan spells at Chesterfield, Mansfield Town and Bradford City.

== Club career ==
=== Sheffield United ===
Annerson came through the youth ranks at Sheffield United and was loaned out to Rotherham United in September 2007 for 3 months as cover, but returned to Sheffield United after making just one appearance for the Millers, in a Football League Trophy match against Grimsby Town. He was then loaned out to Chesterfield in March 2008 to gain further experience, but failed to make a first team appearance before returning to Bramall Lane.

Annerson was again loaned out to Rotherham United for one month in October 2008. He returned to Bramall Lane in November having once again failed to make a first team start and was almost immediately loaned out again to Mansfield Town as emergency cover for their injured keeper.

Annerson made his debut for the Stags on the day of his arrival, starting in a 2–0 defeat at Kidderminster. Having played once more for the Stags he returned to Bramall Lane after two weeks when Mansfield's regular keeper regained fitness. At the end of the 2008–09 season, he was released by Sheffield United.

=== Rotherham United ===
After being released by Sheffield United, Annerson joined Rotherham United on a free transfer. Remaining on the fringes of the first team, he moved on loan to Bradford City in February 2012. He was transfer listed by Rotherham in May 2012, before being released from his contract by mutual agreement in July 2012.

=== Sheffield F.C. ===
Annerson signed for the club after impressing manager Ian Whitehorne in a trial game.

== International career ==
Annerson impressed enough in the Blades reserves to earn a place in the England U-19s.

== Career statistics ==
| Club | Season | League | | FA Cup | | League Cup | | Other | | Total | |
| Club | Season | Apps | Goals | Apps | Goals | Apps | Goals | Apps | Goals | Apps | Goals |
|---|---|---|---|---|---|---|---|---|---|---|---|
| Sheffield United | 2007–08 | 0 | 0 | 0 | 0 | 0 | 0 | 0 | 0 | 0 | 0 |
| Rotherham United (loan) | 2007–08 | 0 | 0 | 0 | 0 | 0 | 0 | 1 | 0 | 1 | 0 |
| Chesterfield (loan) | 2007–08 | 0 | 0 | 0 | 0 | 0 | 0 | 0 | 0 | 0 | 0 |
| Sheffield United | 2008–09 | 0 | 0 | 0 | 0 | 0 | 0 | 0 | 0 | 0 | 0 |
| Rotherham United (loan) | 2008–09 | 0 | 0 | 0 | 0 | 0 | 0 | 0 | 0 | 0 | 0 |
| Mansfield Town (loan) | 2008–09 | 1 | 0 | 0 | 0 | 0 | 0 | 0 | 0 | 1 | 0 |
| Rotherham United | 2009–10 | 0 | 0 | 0 | 0 | 0 | 0 | 0 | 0 | 0 | 0 |
| Rotherham United | 2010–11 | 9 | 0 | 1 | 0 | 0 | 0 | 3 | 0 | 13 | 0 |
| Rotherham United | 2011–12 | 0 | 0 | 0 | 0 | 0 | 0 | 0 | 0 | 0 | 0 |
| Bradford City (loan) | 2011–12 | 0 | 0 | 0 | 0 | 0 | 0 | 0 | 0 | 0 | 0 |
| Sheffield FC | 2013 | 0 | 0 | 0 | 0 | 0 | 0 | 0 | 0 | 0 | 0 |
| Career total | | 10 | 0 | 1 | 0 | 0 | 0 | 4 | 0 | 15 | 0 |
