= Caden Kelly =

English footballer (born 2003)

Personal information
- Full name: Caden Christopher Kelly
- Date of birth: 20 November 2003 (age 22)
- Place of birth: Manchester England
- Position: Midfielder

Team information
- Current team: South Shields

Youth career
- Manchester City
- Salford City
- 2020: Football Flick Academy
- 2020–2021: Sunderland

Senior career*
Years	Team	Apps	(Gls)
2021–2025	Sunderland	0	(0)
2024–2025	→ Darlington (loan)	28	(6)
2025–	South Shields	16	(4)
- * Club domestic league appearances and goals as of 3 March 2026

Caden Christopher Kelly (born 20 November 2003) is an English professional footballer who plays as a midfielder for National League North club South Shields.

== Club career ==
Kelly was born in Manchester, England. Manchester, England. He started his career with Manchester City, spending ten years before a stint in the academy of Salford City. After a brief period with the Football Flick Academy, he signed for Sunderland. He signed his first professional contract with Sunderland in July 2022.

Kelly joined National League North club Darlington on 17 October 2024 on a month's loan, which was gradually extended until the end of the season.

== Career statistics ==
As of end of 2024–25 season

Appearances and goals by club, season and competition
Club	Season	League			FA Cup		EFL Cup		Other		Total	
Club	Season	Division	Apps	Goals	Apps	Goals	Apps	Goals	Apps	Goals	Apps	Goals
Sunderland	2021–22	League One	0	0	0	0	0	0	1 (Note: Appearance in EFL Trophy)	0	1	0
Sunderland	2022–23	Championship	0	0	0	0	1	0	—		1	0
Sunderland	2023–24	Championship	0	0	0	0	0	0	—		0	0
Sunderland	2024–25	Championship	0	0	0	0	0	0	—		0	0
Sunderland	Total		0	0	0	0	1	0	0	0	1	0
Darlington (loan)	2024–25	National League North	28	6	—		—		2 (Note: Appearances in FA Trophy)	0	30	6
Career total			27	6	0	0	1	0	3	0	31	6
