= David Haggerty (footballer) =

English footballer

Personal information
- Full name: David Patrick Haggerty
- Date of birth: 28 March 1991 (age 35)
- Place of birth: Sheffield, England
- Height: 6 ft 4 in (1.93 m)
- Position: Central defender

Youth career
- 2006–2008: Rotherham United

Senior career*
Years	Team	Apps	(Gls)
2008–2010	Rotherham United	1	(0)
- → Sheffield (loan)
2009	→ Ilkeston Town (loan)	3	(0)
2010–2011	Eastwood Town	35	(2)
2011–2012	FC Halifax Town	5	(0)
2011–2012	→ Eastwood Town (loan)	21	(3)
2012–2013	Buxton		
2013–2014	Matlock Town		
Total		65+	(5+)
- * Club domestic league appearances and goals as of 16:01, 9 January 2015 (UTC)

David Patrick Haggerty (born 28 March 1991) is an English former professional footballer who played as a central defender.

== Career ==
Born in Sheffield, Haggerty began his career with Rotherham United. He made his debut professional debut for them in the Football League in the last game of the 2007–08 season, in a 1–0 victory against Barnet on 3 May 2008. While at Rotherham, Haggerty spent a loan spell at Ilkeston Town in early 2009, making 3 appearances. He had also spent a loan spell with Sheffield. He signed a new one-year contract with the club in May 2009, but was released when his contract expired at the end of the 2009–10 season.

Haggerty joined non-league Eastwood Town on trial in July 2010, signing a one-year contract with the club later that month. He moved to FC Halifax Town in May 2011. He returned to Eastwood Town on an initial two-month loan in November 2011, making 21 league appearances for them. He spent the 2012–13 season with Buxton, making 44 appearances for them in all competitions. He moved to Matlock Town in June 2013. After making 54 appearances for the club in all competitions, he left in November 2014 to take a break away from football. While playing with Matlock as a semi-professional, Haggerty also worked as an administrator for a window company.
