= Lukas Jutkiewicz =

English footballer (born 1989)

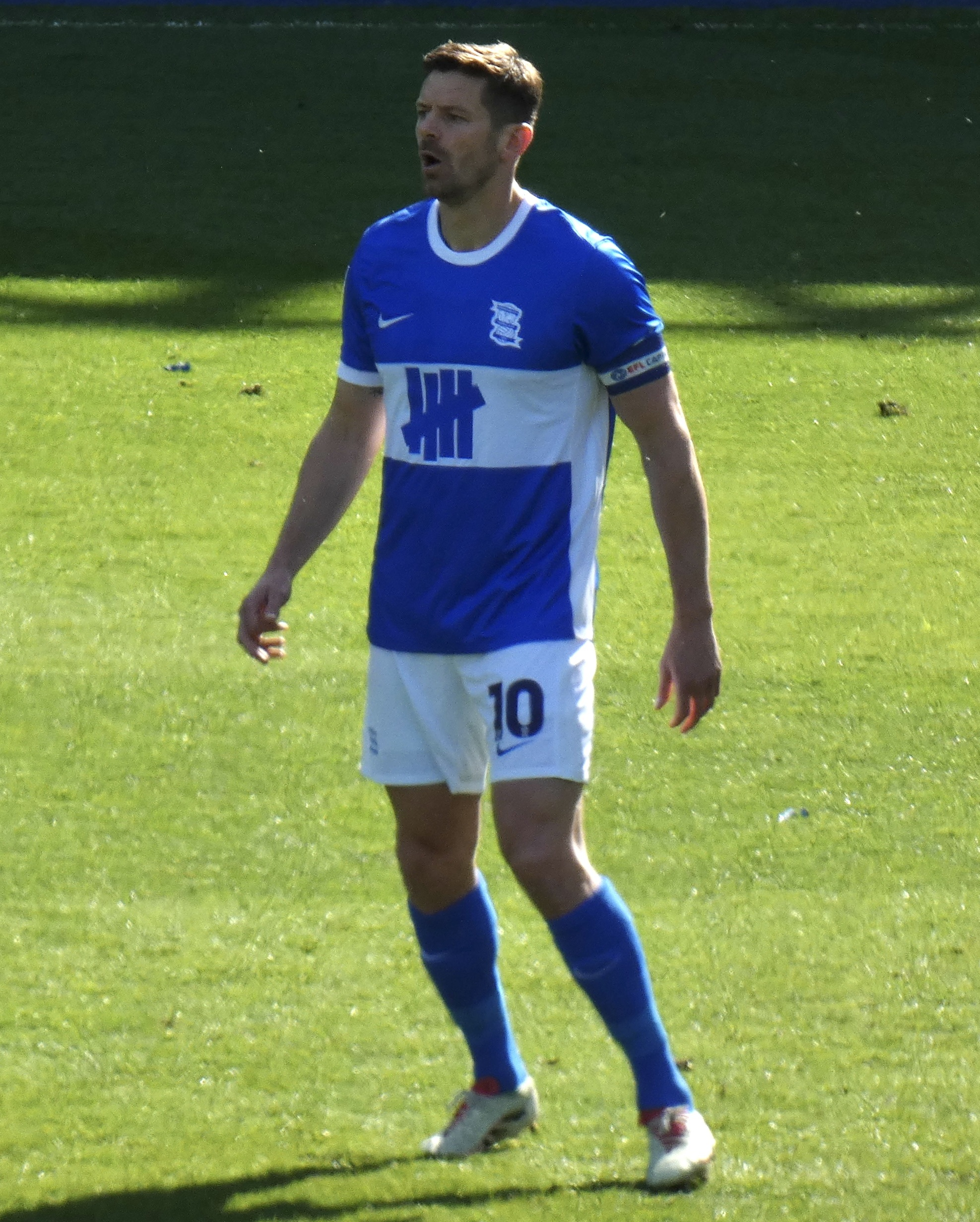
- Jutkiewicz in 2025 with Birmingham City

Personal information
- Full name: Lukas Isaac Paul Jutkiewicz
- Date of birth: 28 March 1989 (age 37)
- Place of birth: Southampton, England
- Height: 6 ft 1 in (1.85 m)
- Position: Striker

Youth career
- 1999–2002: Southampton
- 2004–2006: Swindon Town

Senior career*
Years	Team	Apps	(Gls)
2006–2007	Swindon Town	38	(5)
2007–2010	Everton	1	(0)
2008	→ Plymouth Argyle (loan)	3	(0)
2009	→ Huddersfield Town (loan)	7	(0)
2009–2010	→ Motherwell (loan)	33	(12)
2010–2012	Coventry City	67	(18)
2012	→ Middlesbrough (loan)	1	(0)
2012–2014	Middlesbrough	64	(11)
2014	→ Bolton Wanderers (loan)	20	(7)
2014–2017	Burnley	32	(0)
2016–2017	→ Birmingham City (loan)	20	(8)
2017–2025	Birmingham City	310	(56)
Total		596	(117)
- * Club domestic league appearances and goals

Lukas Isaac Paul Jutkiewicz (born 28 March 1989) is an English former professional footballer who played as a striker. He played for Swindon Town, Everton, Plymouth Argyle, Huddersfield Town, Motherwell, Coventry City, Middlesbrough, Bolton Wanderers, Burnley and Birmingham City.

== Club career ==
Jutkiewicz was born in Southampton, and joined the Saints Academy as a ten-year-old after playing Tyro League football with Eastleigh Earls and Winsor. He attended Highfield Primary School and also attended The Mountbatten School in Romsey. After three years at the academy, he left but continued to play Tyro League football with Brendon Youth, before signing for Swindon Town.

=== Swindon Town ===
Jutkiewicz made his Swindon Town debut at the age of 17, as a substitute in a 2–1 defeat at Swansea City's Liberty Stadium in April 2006. A week later, he had his first start, in a 2–1 win away to Scunthorpe United. Jutkiewicz received the club's Young Player of the Year award at the end of the season, and signed his first professional contract, of three years, in July 2006. He had to wait until December for his first league start of the 2006–07 season, which came in a 2–0 defeat to Mansfield Town. In the next game, playing as a lone striker against top-of-the-table Walsall, he scored his first senior goal, had another attempt cleared off the line, and was fouled for a penalty converted by Christian Roberts to give Swindon a 2–0 victory. On 17 March 2007, Jutkiewicz agreed to join Premier League club Everton. The contract, to come into force when the transfer window opened at the end of the season, was for four years, and the fee was undisclosed, but reported as £400,000 potentially rising to £1 million. He went on to score five goals during the 2006–07 season to help Swindon gain promotion back to League One.

=== Everton ===
Jutkiewicz joined up with Everton for pre-season training in July 2007, and was given squad number 27, previously allocated to Andy van der Meyde. He was loaned to Plymouth Argyle until the end of the 2007–08 Championship season, in time to make his debut on 1 January 2008, replacing Jimmy Abdou after 76 minutes of their 1–0 defeat at Cardiff City. Working under Paul Sturrock, his former manager at Swindon, Jutkiewicz made four more appearances over the next few weeks, but struggled both physically and for confidence and was unable to retain a place even in the matchday squad.

Jutkiewicz made his Everton debut – and what proved his only first-team appearance – in December 2008, coming on as a substitute in a 3–0 league victory over Sunderland. The following month he was again sent out on loan, this time to League One club Huddersfield Town until the end of the season. He made his first start for Huddersfield in a 1–0 win over Leeds United in February 2009, and played well in the next match, but his form declined. He was substituted just half an hour into his seventh appearance, after Cheltenham Town had taken a two-goal lead, and reacted by throwing a training top on the ground. Although he apologised afterwards, he did not appear again.

In August 2009, Jutkiewicz joined Scottish Premier League (SPL) club Motherwell on loan until January 2010. He scored his first goal for the Fir Park outfit against Falkirk, and continued to play and score regularly, with seven goals in the first half of the season. The loan period was extended to the end of the season, and he scored three more goals before a drought set in. In the penultimate match of the season, on 5 May 2010 at home to Hibernian, he won the man-of-the-match award in the highest-scoring match in SPL history; he scored an outstanding injury-time goal from a tight angle to complete Motherwell's comeback from 6–2 down to draw 6–6 and keep alive his team's hopes of a Europa League spot. He had been playing through a knee injury incurred three months earlier and was praised for his determination by manager Craig Brown, who described the goal as "van Basten-like". However, it could not be considered for goal of the season because the award had already been presented to Anthony Stokes. Four days later, Jutkiewicz converted a penalty in stoppage time to secure a 3–3 draw against Rangers at Ibrox. He netted a total of 12 goals during his time with Motherwell.

=== Coventry City ===
Jutkiewicz was transferred to Championship club Coventry City on 26 July 2010 for an undisclosed fee; he signed a three-year contract. Manager Aidy Boothroyd stressed that he was "at the right age ... to grow and develop with Coventry City." He made his competitive debut on the opening day of the season in a 2–0 home win against Portsmouth, and scored his first goal for the club a week later with a stoppage-time equaliser in a 2–2 draw at Watford. He played regularly during the 2010–11 season, mainly as a member of the starting eleven, and scored nine goals, all in league competition. At the end of the August 2011 transfer window, Mddlesbrough's offer for Jutkiewicz, who had scored against them a few days earlier, was rejected, as were suggestions of a loan move; manager Andy Thorn said the player was very much part of their plans for the season. Jutkiewicz scored another nine goals by the beginning of January 2012, and Middlesbrough renewed their interest.

=== Middlesbrough ===
Because a permanent transfer could not be completed in time for Jutkiewicz to play in Middlesbrough's fixture against Burnley on 14 January 2012, he joined the club initially on an emergency loan deal. The permanent transfer, on a four-and-a-half-year contract for a fee reported by BBC Sport to be in the region of £1.3m, was completed a few days later. Jutkiewicz scored his first goal for Middlesbrough in an FA Cup fourth-round replay against Sunderland, and followed this on 14 February with his first league goal, in a 2–1 win against Nottingham Forest. He scored just once more that season, and manager Tony Mowbray suggested that he "was probably trying too hard to adapt his game rather than playing exclusively to his strengths."

After an injury setback at the start of the 2012–13 season, Jutkiewicz scored his first two goals of the season for Boro in his first start, against Blackburn Rovers in a 2–1 victory away from home. He followed up with another brace at home to Derby County to give him four goals from three starts. After another month out with knee damage, Jutkiewicz scored another four league goals, the last of which came in the 3–1 away defeat to Derby on New Year's Day. He added two to his season tally in the FA Cup win against Aldershot, but his form faded together with Middlesbrough's promotion chances.

For the 2013–14 season, Jutkiewicz was given the number 9 shirt, previously worn by Marvin Emnes. Despite claiming Boro's only goal of the opening-day fixture against Leicester City, it was credited as an own goal by Sean St Ledger, so Jutkiewicz's first goal of the season came in the next match, a shock 2–1 defeat to Accrington Stanley in the League Cup. He scored the only goal of the next match, away to Charlton Athletic, but that was his last in more than 20 appearances. In October, Jutkiewicz missed several chances in a defeat against bottom-of-the-table Barnsley that led to the dismissal of Mowbray. Mowbray's successor as manager, Aitor Karanka, rejected an approach from Blackburn Rovers to take Jutkiewicz on loan before he had had chance to assess the squad; by January, he had concluded that a move might boost the player's confidence.

On 28 January 2014, Jutkiewicz joined Bolton Wanderers on loan for the remainder of the 2013–14 season. He made his debut the same day, coming off the bench in a 2–1 defeat to Queens Park Rangers. He scored his first goal for the club in a 2–2 draw with AFC Bournemouth on 8 February, and finished the season with seven goals from twenty appearances.

=== Burnley ===
Jutkiewicz joined newly promoted Premier League side Burnley in July 2014. The fee was undisclosed, but widely reported as £1.5m. He registered six goals in as many games in Burnley's pre-season programme, but when the campaign proper began, the goals disappeared. Jutkiewicz went through the 2014–15 season – 10 starts and 15 substitute appearances in Premier League matches – without a single goal as Burnley were relegated to the Championship. On his sixth appearance of the 2015–16 season, late in a 2–1 win away at Bristol City, he twisted his knee but, as Burnley had used all their substitutes, played on after receiving treatment. The injury was diagnosed as a ruptured cruciate ligament, and although he was able to play for the development squad by the end of the season, he did not return to the first team. He made two substitute appearances in the Premier League in August 2016 before moving out on loan.

=== Birmingham City ===
On 31 August 2016, Jutkiewicz signed on loan for Birmingham City until 2 January 2017. He made his debut on 10 September, as a second-half substitute in a 1–0 win away to Fulham, and started the next match, a goalless draw away to Reading. He scored his first goal on 17 September, a looping header in stoppage time as Birmingham came back from 1–0 down to beat Sheffield Wednesday 2–1. His goalscoring continued, prompting manager Gary Rowett to begin negotiations to make the loan permanent, and after Rowett's dismissal, Gianfranco Zola took up the club's option to sign the player for a fee of £1 million. On 20 December, by which time he had 6 goals, all headers, from 17 appearances, Jutkiewicz signed a three-and-a-half-year contract, with the option of a further year, to begin on 3 January 2017 after the expiry of his loan.

He remained a regular selection despite missing chances, and his 11th goal of the season, on 4 February 2017 at home to Fulham, gave Birmingham their first win under the management of Zola, who praised Jutkiewicz's work-rate and importance to the team even when he was not himself scoring. His next goal, some five weeks later, was a scrappy late equaliser away to Cardiff City; his total of 12 made him the team's top scorer for the season. Zola left the club with three matches left in the season, replaced by Harry Redknapp with the remit of keeping Birmingham in the division. Needing to win the last two matches of the season to avoid relegation, they did so despite Jutkiewicz's missed penalty against Huddersfield; in the final fixture, away to Bristol City, he provided the pass from which Che Adams ran through to score the winning goal.

A calf injury in pre-season kept Jutkiewicz out for the first couple of matches, and then he was used mainly off the bench in a losing run that brought yet another managerial change. He scored his first goal of the season – and Birmingham's first from a recognised striker – to equalise away at Derby County on 23 September under caretaker manager Lee Carsley, with whom he had worked at Everton and Coventry. He started six matches in November and December under Steve Cotterill, but fell out of favour, and his next start was not until March, in the first match of yet another new manager, Garry Monk. According to Carsley, Jutkiewicz was "like a lot of these players who just need a run of games and bit of confidence. You'll see a different side to him then". Ever-present in Monk's starting eleven for the remaining ten matches of the season – yet another relegation battle – he repaid the selection with some useful goals. His first goal in six months was the winner at Bolton Wanderers, he scored a late equaliser at home to Burton Albion, and at home to Fulham on the last day of the campaign, he opened the scoring in a 3–1 win that confirmed Championship football for the season to come.

Jutkiewicz played in every league match in the 2018–19 season. He scored his first senior hat-trick on 6 October as Birmingham beat Rotherham United 3–1, in the middle of a run of eight goals in as many matches that earned him the Championship Player of the Month award, reached double figures on 25 November, and despite a barren mid-season, finished with a career-high 14 goals. He himself attributed the initial run of form to starting matches regularly under Monk, which he had not done under the previous manager. He was one of just four Championship players to reach double figures of both goals and assists, and his partnership with the prolific Adams meant Birmingham would have finished in mid-table at worst had it not been for a nine-point deduction for financial misconduct. The Birmingham Mail rated him as their player of the season, not only for goals and assists: "just as valuable were the unheralded hours of being battered by defenders, winning headers, holding up possession. Bandaged, bruised but rarely bettered." Those strengths also placed him top of the Championship statistical rankings compiled by the Sky Sports and WhoScored.com websites.

Jutkiewicz's contract was extended to cover the 2024–25 season.

On 26 April 2025, Birmingham City announced that Jutkiewicz would be retiring from football at the end of the season.

== International career ==
In addition to his country of birth, England, Jutkiewicz was also eligible to play for the Republic of Ireland through his Irish grandmother and for Poland by way of his Polish grandfather. In October 2007, he told Everton TV that, if Poland wanted him, he was ready, but, speaking in 2009, the player insisted that he had made no decision on which country to represent, nor had he been contacted by any of the three associations. In 2008, the media claimed that he was also eligible to represent Lithuania, with the player speculating about that in 2014 again; still, no interest for that was registered by either party. In December 2016, it was reported that Martin O'Neill was interested in recruiting Jutkiewicz for his Ireland squad. Ultimately, however, Jutkiewicz failed to gain international honours for any country.

== Career statistics ==
As of end of 2024–25 season

Appearances and goals by club, season and competition
Club	Season	League			National cup (Note: Appearances in FA Cup and Scottish Cup)		League cup (Note: Appearances in Scottish League Cup and Football League Cup/EFL Cup)		Other		Total	
Club	Season	Division	Apps	Goals	Apps	Goals	Apps	Goals	Apps	Goals	Apps	Goals
Swindon Town	2005–06	League One	5	0	0	0	0	0	0	0	5	0
Swindon Town	2006–07	League Two	33	5	3	0	0	0	1 (Note: Appearance in Football League Trophy)	0	37	5
Swindon Town	Total		38	5	3	0	0	0	1	0	42	5
Plymouth Argyle (loan)	2007–08	Championship	3	0	2	0	—		—		5	0
Everton	2008–09	Premier League	1	0	0	0	0	0	0	0	1	0
Everton	2009–10	Premier League	0	0	0	0	0	0	0	0	0	0
Everton	Total		1	0	0	0	0	0	0	0	1	0
Huddersfield Town (loan)	2008–09	League One	7	0	—		—		—		7	0
Motherwell (loan)	2009–10	Scottish Premier League	33	12	1	0	2	0	0	0	36	12
Coventry City	2010–11	Championship	42	9	1	0	0	0	—		43	9
Coventry City	2011–12	Championship	25	9	—		1	0	—		26	9
Coventry City	Total		67	18	1	0	1	0	—		69	18
Middlesbrough	2011–12	Championship	19	2	2	1	—		—		21	3
Middlesbrough	2012–13	Championship	24	8	1	2	1	0	—		26	10
Middlesbrough	2013–14	Championship	22	1	1	0	1	1	—		24	2
Middlesbrough	Total		65	11	4	3	2	1	—		71	15
Bolton Wanderers (loan)	2013–14	Championship	20	7	—		—		—		20	7
Burnley	2014–15	Premier League	25	0	0	0	1	0	—		26	0
Burnley	2015–16	Championship	5	0	0	0	1	0	—		6	0
Burnley	2016–17	Premier League	2	0	—		1	0	—		3	0
Burnley	Total		32	0	0	0	3	0	—		35	0
Birmingham City (loan)	2016–17	Championship	20	8	0	0	—		—		20	8
Birmingham City	2016–17	Championship	18	3	2	1	—		—		20	4
Birmingham City	2017–18	Championship	35	5	2	1	1	0	—		38	6
Birmingham City	2018–19	Championship	46	14	1	0	0	0	—		47	14
Birmingham City	2019–20	Championship	46	15	3	0	0	0	—		49	15
Birmingham City	2020–21	Championship	42	8	1	0	0	0	—		43	8
Birmingham City	2021–22	Championship	36	2	0	0	0	0	—		36	2
Birmingham City	2022–23	Championship	43	5	3	1	1	0	—		47	6
Birmingham City	2023–24	Championship	28	3	1	1	2	0	—		31	4
Birmingham City	2024–25	League One	16	1	3	1	2	0	6 (Note: Appearances in EFL Trophy)	0	27	2
Birmingham City	Total		310	56	16	5	6	0	6	0	338	61
Career total			597	117	27	8	14	1	7	0	644	126

== Honours ==
Burnley

- EFL Championship: 2015–16

Birmingham City

- EFL League One: 2024–25
- EFL Trophy runner-up: 2024–25

Individual

- Birmingham City Player of the Year: 2019–20
- Birmingham City Players' Player of the Year: 2019–20
- Birmingham City Top Scorer: 2016–17, 2019–20 2020–21
