= Ben Wells (footballer, born 1988) =

English footballer

Personal information
- Date of birth: 26 March 1988 (age 38)
- Place of birth: England
- Position: Midfielder

Team information
- Current team: Cirencester Town

Senior career*
Years	Team	Apps	(Gls)
2004–2007	Swindon Town	6	(0)
2007–2008	Basingstoke Town		
2008–2010	Weston-super-Mare	14	(0)
2010–2012	Swindon Supermarine	70	(7)
2012–2015	Cirencester Town	67	(9)
- * Club domestic league appearances and goals

Benjamin Wells (born 26 March 1988) is a football midfielder who is a product of the Swindon Town youth set-up.

Wells made his first-team debut as a substitute against Huddersfield Town as Swindon faced the impossible task of defending a game down to 9-men after the sendings off of David Duke and Rory Fallon. Swindon lost 4–0.

In the following 2005/06 season Wells featured from the bench 4 times and it wasn't until his appearance in the last game of the campaign against Huddersfield could Wells boast playing a first team match without losing. He was released in May 2007.

Wells signed a one-year contract with Basingstoke Town Football Club in July 2007, Ben featured for Basingstoke Town Football Club last season during a loan spell from Swindon and put in several strong performances, including being part of the memorable FA Cup win at Chesterfield. He was recalled to Swindon straight after the Chesterfield game and was crucially unable to feature in the 2nd Round tie against Aldershot.

After a spell with Weston-super-Mare, he signed for Swindon Supermarine in 2010.
