= Andrew Nicholas =

English footballer

Personal information
- Full name: Andrew Peter Nicholas
- Date of birth: 10 October 1983 (age 43)
- Place of birth: Liverpool, England
- Position: Defender

Team information
- Current team: Marine

Senior career*
Years	Team	Apps	(Gls)
2002–2003	Liverpool	0	(0)
2003–2008	Swindon Town	126	(4)
2005	→ Chester City (loan)	5	(0)
2008–2010	Rotherham United	26	(0)
2010	→ Mansfield Town (loan)	14	(1)
2010–2012	Barrow	28	(0)
2010–2011	→ Vauxhall Motors (loan)	7	(3)
2012–2014	Vauxhall Motors	82	(5)
2014–2016	Marine		
2016	Warrington Town		
2016–2017	Marine		
- * Club domestic league appearances and goals as of 17:18, 4 May 2012 (UTC)

Andrew Peter Nicholas (born 10 October 1983 in Liverpool) is an English footballer. He plays as a central defender for Warrington Town.

Nicholas began his career at Liverpool, where he was timed as being faster than England international Michael Owen. Andrew Nicholas was released in the summer of 2003 but was swiftly snapped up by Swindon Town manager Andy King on a one-year contract.

Nicholas did not appear in the Swindon first team until October but soon found himself a regular as the Robins earned a place in the Division Two play-offs only to lose narrowly to Brighton & Hove Albion in the semi-finals. During the season a two-year extension to his Swindon contract was offered which he accepted. Injuries and lack of form kept "Nico" out of the team in his next season and he spent a month out on loan to Chester City before returning for the remaining fixtures of Swindon's season.

He found himself out of the squad at the start of the 2005/06 season, not helped by a poor showing against Oldham Athletic, but Swindon suffered a horrendous run of form which saw King sacked and Iffy Onuora take over as Swindon manager. "Nico" found himself back in the starting line-up for the remainder of the season. Nicholas was offered a one-year contract by Onuora at the end of the season but before agreeing terms, Onuora was dismissed as manager and was swiftly replaced by Dennis Wise. Wise felt it was unfair to withdraw the offer and Nicholas signed up for the 2006/07 League Two campaign becoming Swindon's longest serving player in the process.

He was released by new manager Maurice Malpas at the end of the 2007–08 season, ending his five-year career with Swindon with 6 goals from 141 games in all competitions. He then signed for Rotherham United at the end of August 2008. He spent two seasons in the club, including a loan spell at Mansfield Town. After leaving Rotherham he signed for Barrow of the Football Conference. In May 2011 he was transfer listed by Barrow, but removed from the list in July. He never gained a regular place in the first team squad, and was let go at the end of the 2011–12 season.

Following his departure from Barrow, Nicholas joined Vauxhall Motors, for whom he was an ever-present during the 2012–13 and 2013–14 seasons.
