= Pascal Struijk =

Dutch footballer (born 1999)

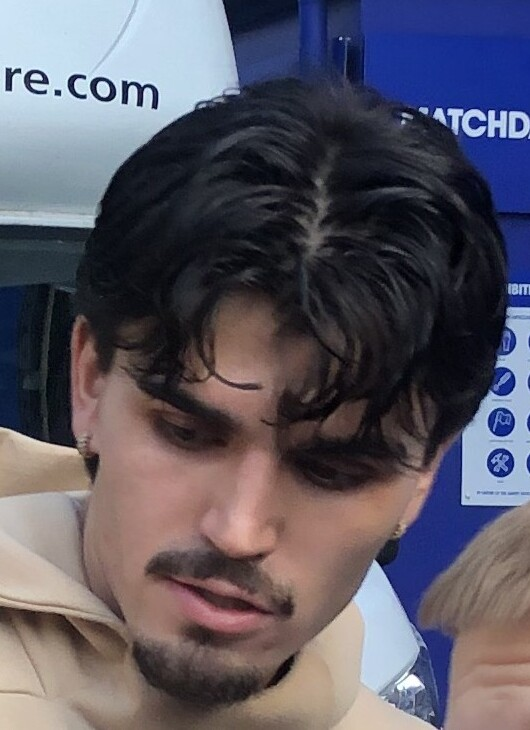
- Struijk in 2025

Personal information
- Full name: Pascal Augustus Struijk
- Date of birth: 11 August 1999 (age 27)
- Place of birth: Deurne, Belgium
- Height: 1.90 m (6 ft 3 in)
- Position: Centre-back

Team information
- Current team: Brighton & Hove Albion
- Number: 4

Youth career
- 2006–2016: ADO Den Haag
- 2016–2018: Ajax
- 2018: Leeds United

Senior career*
Years	Team	Apps	(Gls)
2018–2026	Leeds United	182	(12)
2026–	Brighton & Hove Albion	4	(0)

International career
2016	Netherlands U17	3	(0)
- * Club domestic league appearances and goals as of 10 October 2026

Pascal Augustus Struijk (born 11 August 1999) is a professional footballer who plays as a centre-back for Premier League club Brighton & Hove Albion. Born in Belgium, he has represented the Netherlands at youth level.

== Club career ==
=== Early career ===
Struijk started his youth career at ADO Den Haag at the age of seven before moving to Ajax in 2016. In his age group, he would compete with fellow left-sided centre-back and future international Sven Botman and struggled to make an impression, even being tried as a striker in some youth games. With his contract due to expire in the summer of 2018, Struijk joined Leeds United on trial in January of the same year before signing permanently later that month on a three-and-a-half-year deal.

=== Leeds United ===
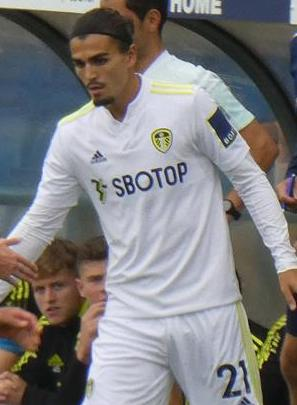
Struijk playing for Leeds United in 2021

His first involvement with the first team came on 13 April 2018, when he was named on the bench against Aston Villa in a 1–0 defeat. Struijk was a regular for the Leeds United under-23 side over the course the 2018–19 season, and he featured in the team that won the Professional Development League on 6 May 2019, beating Birmingham City on penalties having drawn the final 0–0. He was named on the bench by Marcelo Bielsa for both legs of the Championship play-off semi-final against Derby County, but did not come off the bench for either; Leeds lost 4–3 on aggregate over the two legs.

On 10 December 2019, Struijk made his debut for Leeds United, coming on as a 91st-minute substitute for Hélder Costa in a 2–0 victory at home to Hull City. His second appearance came in the following match as a late substitute in a 3–3 draw at home to Cardiff City, with Struijk failing to clear the ball in the build-up to Robert Glatzel's late equaliser. He made his third appearance for the club as a 61st-minute substitute in a 1–0 win against Barnsley on 17 July 2020, with him being praised for his performance as a defensive midfielder. He made his full debut on 19 July 2020, starting in the team that beat Derby County 3–1 in the penultimate game of the season. Another appearance against Charlton Athletic followed in the final game of the season as Leeds finished the 2019–20 season at the top of the Championship, and were thus promoted to the Premier League.

Due to an injury to fellow Leeds United centre-back Liam Cooper, Struijk started Leeds' first league game of the 2020–21 season; a 4–3 away defeat to Premier League champions Liverpool. He signed a new three-and-a-half-year deal on 20 November 2020, lasting until summer 2024. He scored the first goal of his senior career on 14 February 2021 in a 4–2 defeat away to Arsenal, netting a header from a Raphinha corner in the 58th-minute. He scored once in 27 league appearances in his debut Premier League campaign.

On 12 September 2021, Struijk came on in the 33rd minute for the injured Diego Llorente, in a 3–0 home loss to Liverpool. In the 58th minute, Struijk fouled Harvey Elliott, which dislocated Elliott's ankle. Struijk was then sent off in the 60th minute for the tackle. With Leeds in the Premier League relegation places with two matches of the Premier League season remaining, Struijk headed in a 92nd equaliser to draw 1–1 with Brighton & Hove Albion in their penultimate match, before a 2–1 final day victory over Brentford, in which Struijk appeared as a substitute, ensured Leeds' Premier League survival as they finished 17th. Struijk made 29 Premier League appearances over the course of the season.

Struijk started the 2022–23 season playing at left-back due to an injury to Junior Firpo. He scored his first goal of the season in the club's 2–1 loss to Crystal Palace on 9 October 2022. On 21 December 2022, it was announced that Struijk had extended his contract until the summer of 2027. "It's an amazing club. It was really easy for me to extend because I am really happy here," the BBC cited Struijk as saying. On 17 February 2025, he netted his first brace for the Whites in a 2–1 victory over Sunderland, two headed goals after being introduced as a 71st-minute substitute, sending Leeds back to the top of the Championship.

Struijk's 2024–25 campaign ended on 11 April 2025 after suffering a season-ending foot injury in a 1–1 draw against Luton Town at Kenilworth Road. He was promoted back to the Premier League with Leeds following a 6–0 win over Stoke City at Elland Road and Sheffield United's 2–1 loss to Burnley at Turf Moor. Leeds United won the 2024–25 EFL Championship title following a 2–1 win over Plymouth Argyle at Home Park on 3 May 2025.

=== Brighton & Hove Albion ===
On 30 June 2026, Struijk signed a five-year contract with Brighton & Hove Albion.

== International career ==
Struijk was capped three times by the Netherlands under-17 team in 2016. In September 2022, he was named in a provisional Netherlands squad for international fixtures later that month, before being named in a 39-man provisional Dutch squad for the 2022 FIFA World Cup.

== Style of play ==
Struijk is left-footed. He primarily plays as a centre-back, but can also play as a defensive midfielder, and as a left-back. Impressive in the air at either end, Struijk has been compared to Dutch international Virgil van Dijk due to his imposing physical play and ability on the ball.

== Personal life ==
Struijk was born in Deurne in Belgium, but moved to The Hague at the age of three. He is of Indonesian descent through his maternal grandfather.

== Career statistics ==
As of match played 10 October 2026

Appearances and goals by club, season and competition
Club	Season	League			FA Cup		EFL Cup		Europe		Total	
Club	Season	Division	Apps	Goals	Apps	Goals	Apps	Goals	Apps	Goals	Apps	Goals
Leeds United	2019–20	Championship	5	0	0	0	0	0	—		5	0
Leeds United	2020–21	Premier League	27	1	1	0	1	0	—		29	1
Leeds United	2021–22	Premier League	29	1	0	0	2	0	—		31	1
Leeds United	2022–23	Premier League	29	2	1	0	1	0	—		31	2
Leeds United	2023–24	Championship	23	3	0	0	2	2	—		25	5
Leeds United	2024–25	Championship	35	5	2	0	1	0	—		38	5
Leeds United	2025–26	Premier League	34	0	3	0	0	0	—		37	0
Leeds United	Total		182	12	7	0	7	2	—		196	14
Brighton & Hove Albion	2026–27	Premier League	4	0	0	0	1	0	1	0	6	0
Career total			186	12	7	0	8	2	1	0	202	14

== Honours ==
Leeds United

- EFL Championship: 2019–20, 2024–25
