= 2021–22 Leeds United F.C. season =

102nd season in existence of Leeds United

Leeds United
2021–22 season
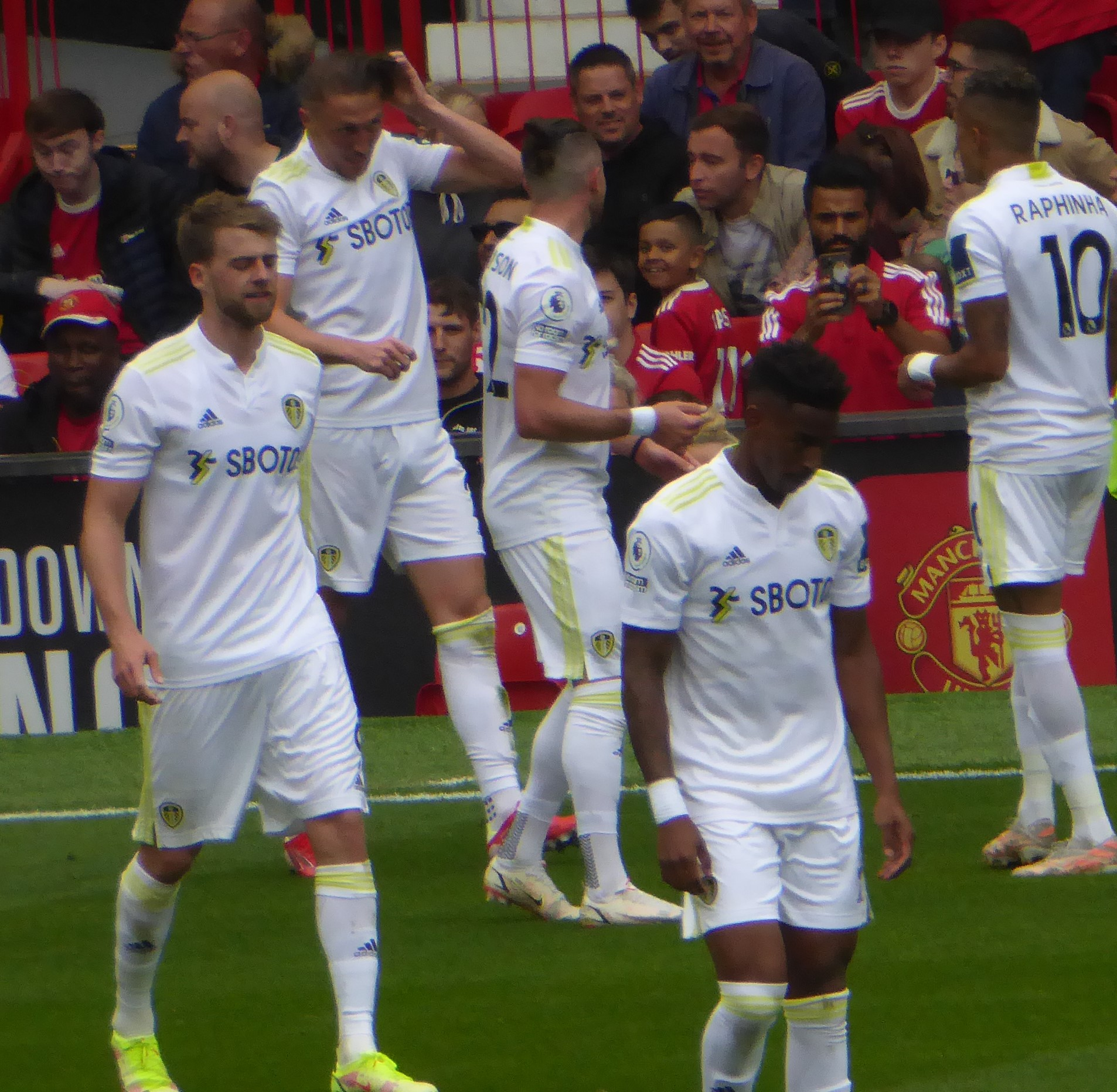
- Leeds United players during a match in August 2021
- Chairman: Andrea Radrizzani
- Head coach: Marcelo Bielsa (until 27 February); Jesse Marsch (from 28 February)
- Stadium: Elland Road
- Premier League: 17th
- FA Cup: Third round
- EFL Cup: Fourth round
- Top goalscorer: League: Raphinha (11); All: Raphinha (11)
- Highest home attendance: 36,715 vs Manchester United (20 February 2022, Premier League)
- Lowest home attendance: 34,154 vs Crewe Alexandra (24 August 2021, EFL Cup)
- Average home league attendance: 36,405
Home colours	Away colours	Third colours

The 2021–22 season was Leeds United's 102nd season in existence. It was their second consecutive season in the Premier League, and in general, it is their 52nd ever season in the top flight of English football. In addition to the league, they also competed in the FA Cup and EFL Cup.

== Background and pre-season ==
Former Argentina head coach Marcelo Bielsa was appointed as manager of Leeds United in summer 2018, and after finishing 3rd in the 2018–19 season and failing to secure promotion through the play-offs, the club were promoted to the top-tier Premier League in 2020 after 16 years outside of it, after finishing the 2019–20 season as champions of the second-tier EFL Championship. Leeds finished 9th in the 2020–21 season after a strong end to the campaign, picking up 23 points from the final 10 matches. On 12 August 2021, it was announced that head coach Marcelo Bielsa had signed a new one-year contract with the club after his previous contract ran out after the end of the previous season on 30 June 2021.

On 18 June 2021, Leeds announced six pre-season friendly matches, against Guiseley, Blackburn Rovers, Fleetwood Town, Real Betis, Ajax and Villarreal.

Win	Draw	Loss

Date	Opponent	Venue	Result F–A	Scorers	Attendance	Ref.
27 July 2021	Guiseley	Away	3–2	Summerville 19' (pen.), Greenwood 43', Allen 84'		
28 July 2021	Blackburn Rovers	Away	1–1	Struijk 81'	8,883	
30 July 2021	Fleetwood Town	Away	1–2	Cresswell 24'		
31 July 2021	Real Betis	Neutral	2–3	Bamford 6', Klich 57'		
4 August 2021	Jong Ajax (Note: Match contested by a Leeds United XI)	Away	1–3	Dean 90' (pen.)	0	
4 August 2021	Ajax	Away	0–4	—	25,000	
7 August 2021	Villarreal	Neutral	2–2	Klich 9', Bamford 40'	0	

== Review ==
=== August ===
Leeds began their Premier League campaign against rivals Manchester United at Old Trafford on 14 August 2021, live on BT Sport, losing by a score of 5–1. Bruno Fernandes opened the scoring for Manchester United in the 30th minute. After the half-time interval, Luke Ayling levelled the scores, with his first Premier League goal for Leeds. Mason Greenwood then put Manchester United ahead again in the 52nd minute, after Paul Pogba released him down the left wing. Fernandes added Manchester United's third in the 54th minute, after another assist from Pogba, and he completed his hat-trick with Manchester United's fourth goal in the 60th minute after Victor Lindelöf found him with a long ball. Fred then scored Manchester United's fifth goal in the 68th minute after a fourth assist from Pogba, a joint-Premier League record for a single match.

Leeds hosted Everton at Elland Road on 21 August, drawing 2–2. Dominic Calvert-Lewin opening the scoring from a penalty after referee Darren England ruled that Liam Cooper had fouled Calvert-Lewin by pulling on his shirt. Mateusz Klich equalised for Leeds following a pass from Patrick Bamford. In the second half, Everton went in front after a Demarai Gray goal, however, Leeds later equalised through Raphinha. Raphinha became the first Leeds player to score in three consecutive matches against Everton since Peter Lorimer.

Leeds' following match was against League One club Crewe Alexandra at Elland Road in the EFL Cup second round on 24 August, winning 3–0. Kalvin Phillips and two from Jack Harrison the goal-scorers.

Leeds travelled to Turf Moor to play Sean Dyche's Burnley on 29 August, drawing 1–1. Burnley opened the scoring after a Matthew Lowton shot fell into former Leeds player Chris Wood's path, allowing him to prod the ball home; however, Leeds equalised through Bamford after a Jamie Shackleton shot fell into his path so he could foot it into the Burnley goal past Nick Pope.

=== September ===
Leeds' first match after the first international break of the season saw them host Jürgen Klopp's Liverpool at Elland Road on 12 September, losing 3–0 with Pascal Struijk receiving a red card due to a challenge on Harvey Elliott that resulted in a serious injury.

Leeds travelled to St James' Park on 17 September to face Newcastle United, drawing 1–1. An early Leeds goal from Raphinha was cancelled out by Allan Saint-Maximin before half time; a 2–1 loss at home to West Ham United followed with a 90th-minute goal by Michail Antonio winning it for the visitors on 25 September.

=== October ===
Leeds started October with a 1–0 win over Watford at Elland Road on 2 October. Leeds travelled to Southampton on 16 October, losing 1–0. Armando Broja netting the only goal of the match. Wolves visited Elland Road on 23 October, drawing 1–1. A Rodrigo penalty in stoppage time earned a point for Leeds. Leeds travelled to Carrow Road to play Norwich City on 31 October, winning 2–1.

=== November ===
Leeds started November with Leicester City visiting Elland Road, drawing 1–1. Leeds' following match was a 2–1 defeat at the Tottenham Hotspur Stadium, a 0–0 draw at Brighton followed. Leeds' following match against Crystal Palace at Elland Road was 0–0 as Raphinha floated in a corner kick and Liam Cooper’s connecting header was blocked by the hand of Palace defender Marc Guéhi. Raphinha slotted the penalty past Vicente Guaita to win the match for Leeds on 30 November.

=== December ===
Leeds started December against Brentford at Elland Road, drawing 2–2. Patrick Bamford scored his second goal of the season in second half stoppage time to earn a point for Leeds. Leeds travelled to Stamford Bridge to face Chelsea on 11 December, losing 3–2. Jorginho scored the winner for Chelsea in the 94th minute from the penalty spot. Leeds' biggest defeat of the season followed at the Etihad Stadium, losing 7–0. Leeds ended December with a 4–1 defeat at home to Arsenal.

=== January ===
Leeds won 3–1 at home to Burnley in their opening match of 2022; Jack Harrison put Leeds 1–0 up in the 39th minute, though Maxwel Cornet equalised for Burnley with a 54th minute free-kick. Stuart Dallas put Leeds back ahead in the 77th minute, before Daniel James scored Leeds' third with a header in the second minute of second-half stoppage time. This was followed by a 3–2 away win against West Ham United on 16 January, with Harrison scoring all three goals to complete the first hat-trick of his career. Leeds then lost 1–0 at home to Newcastle United, with the only goal of the game being a Jonjo Shelvey free-kick.

=== February ===
Leeds started February at Villa Park on 9 February, drawing 3–3. Daniel James scoring a brace for Leeds. Leeds' following match at Goodison Park saw a 3–0 defeat to Everton, defeats to Manchester United 4–2, Liverpool 6–0 and Tottenham Hotspur 4–0.

Following the defeat to Tottenham Hotspur, manager Marcelo Bielsa was sacked on 27 February, and on the following day Jesse Marsch was appointed as his replacement.

=== March ===
Leeds started March by travelling to the King Power Stadium to face Leicester City, losing 1–0. Leeds' following match at Elland Road saw a 3–0 defeat to Aston Villa. Leeds' following match against Norwich City at Elland Road saw Leeds 2–1 winners, following a late goal by Joe Gelhardt. Leeds travelled to Molineux on 18 March to face Wolverhampton Wanderers a second half stoppage time winner from Luke Ayling secured two consecutive victories for Leeds in a 3–2 comeback win.

=== April ===
Leeds started April with Southampton at Elland Road drawing 1–1, this was followed by a 3–0 victory over Watford at Vicarage Road. Leeds travelled to Crystal Palace on 25 April, drawing 0–0. Manchester City visited Elland Road on 30 April, winning 4–0.

=== May ===
Leeds started May by visiting Arsenal at the Emirates Stadium, losing 2–1 and hosting Chelsea at Elland Road, losing 3–0.

Leeds' following match against Brighton at Elland Road finished 1–1.

Leeds travelled to the Brentford Community Stadium on the final day of the season to face Brentford, knowing they had to better Burnley's result to avoid relegation. Burnley hosted Newcastle at Turf Moor and fell behind through Callum Wilson. Leeds took the lead against Brentford through a penalty in the 56th minute that Raphinha won and converted, shortly after Newcastle doubled their lead against Burnley.

In the 69th minute, Maxwel Cornet scored for Burnley, while in London a 78th minute Brentford equaliser through a Canós header saw Burnley's hopes come to life again. Canós was the dismissed just two minutes later for a second bookable offence. Leeds' press for the final 10 minutes come to fruition, with Jack Harrison scoring a deflected long-shot in second half stoppage time which secured survival.

== Transfers ==
=== Transfers in ===
Date	Position	Name	From (Note: Brackets around club names denote the player's contract with that club had expired before he joined Leeds)	Fee	Ref.
28 June 2021	MF	Amari Miller	Birmingham City	Undisclosed	
2 July 2021	MF	Jack Harrison	Manchester City	£11,000,000	
6 July 2021	DF	Junior Firpo	(Spain) Barcelona	£12,800,000	
8 July 2021	MF	Sean McGurk	Wigan Athletic	Undisclosed	
22 July 2021	MF	Lewis Bate	Chelsea	Undisclosed	
31 July 2021	GK	Kristoffer Klaesson	(Norway) Vålerenga	£1,600,000	
27 August 2021	DF	Leo Fuhr Hjelde	(Scotland) Celtic	Undisclosed	
31 August 2021	MF	Daniel James	Manchester United	£25,000,000	
4 January 2022	FW	Mateo Joseph	(Spain) Espanyol	Undisclosed	

=== Transfers out ===
Date	Position	Name	To (Note: Brackets around club names denote the player joined that club after his contract with Leeds expired)	Fee	Ref.
30 June 2021	DF	Ezgjan Alioski	(Saudi Arabia) Al-Ahli	Released	
30 June 2021	DF	Gaetano Berardi	(Switzerland) FC Sion	Released	
30 June 2021	MF	Ouasim Bouy	(Qatar) Al Kharaitiyat	Released	
30 June 2021	DF	Barry Douglas	(Poland) Lech Poznań	Released	
30 June 2021	MF	Cole Gibbon		Released	
30 June 2021	FW	Niklas Haugland	(Norway) Molde	Released	
30 June 2021	MF	Pablo Hernández	(Spain) CD Castellón	Released	
30 June 2021	MF	Eunan O'Kane		Released	
30 June 2021	GK	Matthew Turner	Cardiff City	Released	
1 July 2021	DF	Oliver Casey	Blackpool	Undisclosed	
2 July 2021	FW	Rafa Mújica	(Spain) Las Palmas	Undisclosed	
20 August 2021	DF	Niall Huggins	Sunderland	Undisclosed	
31 August 2021	MF	Robbie Gotts	Barrow	Free transfer	
31 August 2021	DF	Bryce Hosannah	Wrexham	Free transfer	
31 August 2021	MF	Jordan Stevens	Barrow	Free transfer	
23 September 2021	FW	Jimiel Chikukwa	Watford	Free transfer	

=== Loans out ===
Date from	Date to	Position	Name	To	Ref.
1 July 2021	End of season	FW	Ryan Edmondson	Fleetwood Town	
1 July 2021	End of season	FW	Kun Temenuzhkov	(Spain) Real Unión	
2 July 2021	End of season	MF	Alfie McCalmont	Morecambe	
6 July 2021	End of season	DF	Laurens De Bock	(Belgium) Zulte Waregem	
7 July 2021	End of season	MF	Mateusz Bogusz	(Spain) Ibiza	
12 July 2021	End of season	GK	Kiko Casilla	(Spain) Elche	
27 July 2021	End of season	DF	Leif Davis	Bournemouth	
7 August 2021	End of season	GK	Elia Caprile	(Italy) Pro Patria	
24 August 2021	End of season	MF	Ian Poveda	Blackburn Rovers	
31 August 2021	End of season	MF	Hélder Costa	(Spain) Valencia CF	
4 January 2022	End of season	FW	Ryan Edmondson	Port Vale	
12 January 2022	End of season	DF	Cody Drameh	Cardiff City	
26 January 2022	End of season	RW	Josh Galloway	FC United of Manchester	
27 January 2022	End of season	CF	Bobby Kamwa	(Scotland) Dunfermline Athletic	

== First-team squad ==
As of 26 March 2022.

#	Name	Nation	Position	Date of birth (age)	Joined from	Year joined	Contract end date
Goalkeepers
1	Illan Meslier	France	GK	2 March 2000 (aged 21)	(France) Lorient	2020	30 June 2026
13	Kristoffer Klaesson	Norway	GK	27 November 2000 (aged 20)	(Norway) Vålerenga	2021	30 June 2025
Defenders
2	Luke Ayling (vice-captain)	England	DF	25 August 1991 (aged 29)	(England) Bristol City	2016	30 June 2023
3	Junior Firpo	Spain	DF	22 August 1996 (aged 24)	(Spain) Barcelona	2021	30 June 2025
5	Robin Koch	Germany	DF	17 July 1996 (aged 25)	(Germany) Freiburg	2020	30 June 2024
6	Liam Cooper (captain)	Scotland	DF	30 August 1991 (aged 29)	(England) Chesterfield	2014	30 June 2024
14	Diego Llorente	Spain	DF	16 August 1993 (aged 27)	(Spain) Real Sociedad	2020	30 June 2024
21	Pascal Struijk	Netherlands	DF	11 August 1999 (aged 22)	(Netherlands) Ajax	2018	30 June 2024
33	Leo Fuhr Hjelde	Norway	DF	26 August 2003 (aged 17)	(Scotland) Celtic	2021	30 June 2025
35	Charlie Cresswell	England	DF	7 December 2002 (aged 18)	(England) Leeds United Academy	2018	30 June 2025
37	Cody Drameh	England	DF	8 December 2001 (aged 19)	(England) Fulham	2020	30 June 2024
Midfielders
4	Adam Forshaw	England	MF	8 October 1991 (aged 29)	(England) Middlesbrough	2018	30 June 2023
10	Raphinha	Brazil	MF	14 December 1996 (aged 24)	(France) Rennes	2020	30 June 2024
15	Stuart Dallas	Northern Ireland	MF	19 April 1991 (aged 30)	(England) Brentford	2015	30 June 2024
20	Daniel James	Wales	MF	10 November 1997 (aged 23)	(England) Manchester United	2021	30 June 2026
22	Jack Harrison	England	MF	20 November 1996 (aged 24)	(England) Manchester City	2021	30 June 2024
23	Kalvin Phillips	England	MF	2 December 1995 (aged 25)	(England) Leeds United Academy	2010	30 June 2024
26	Lewis Bate	England	MF	28 October 2002 (aged 18)	(England) Chelsea	2021	30 June 2024
38	Crysencio Summerville	Netherlands	MF	30 October 2001 (aged 19)	(Netherlands) Feyenoord	2020	30 June 2023
39	Stuart McKinstry	Scotland	MF	18 September 2002 (aged 18)	(Scotland) Motherwell	2019	30 June 2023
43	Mateusz Klich	Poland	MF	13 June 1990 (aged 31)	(Netherlands) F.C. Twente	2017	30 June 2024
45	Liam McCarron	Scotland	MF	7 March 2001 (aged 20)	(England) Carlisle United	2019	30 June 2023
46	Jamie Shackleton	England	MF	8 October 1999 (aged 21)	(England) Leeds United Academy	2006	30 June 2024
47	Jack Jenkins	England	MF	23 March 2002 (aged 19)	(England) Leeds United Academy	2018	30 June 2023
Attackers
9	Patrick Bamford	England	FW	5 September 1993 (aged 27)	(England) Middlesbrough	2018	30 June 2026
11	Tyler Roberts	Wales	FW	12 January 1999 (aged 22)	(England) West Bromwich Albion	2018	30 June 2024
19	Rodrigo	Spain	FW	6 March 1991 (aged 30)	(Spain) Valencia	2020	30 June 2024
30	Joe Gelhardt	England	FW	4 May 2002 (aged 19)	(England) Wigan Athletic	2020	30 June 2024
42	Sam Greenwood	England	FW	26 January 2002 (aged 19)	(England) Arsenal	2020	30 June 2023

== Competitions ==
=== Premier League ===
==== League table ====
Pos	Team	Pld	W	D	L	GF	GA	GD	Pts	Qualification or relegation
15	Southampton	38	9	13	16	43	67	−24	40	
16	Everton	38	11	6	21	43	66	−23	39	
17	Leeds United	38	9	11	18	42	79	−37	38	
18	Burnley (R)	38	7	14	17	34	53	−19	35	Relegation to EFL Championship
19	Watford (R)	38	6	5	27	34	77	−43	23	Relegation to EFL Championship

Source: Premier League
Rules for classification: 1) Points; 2) Goal difference; 3) Goals scored; 4) If the champions, relegated teams or qualified teams for UEFA competitions cannot be determined by rules 1 to 3, rules 4.1 to 4.3 are applied – 4.1) Points gained in head-to-head record between such teams; 4.2) Away goals scored in head-to-head record between such teams; 4.3) Play-offs
(R) Relegated

==== Matches ====
Win	Draw	Loss

Date	Opponent	Venue	Result F–A	Scorers	Attendance	Referee	League position	Ref.
14 August 2021	Manchester United	Away	1–5	Ayling 49'	72,732	Paul Tierney	20th	
21 August 2021	Everton	Home	2–2	Klich 43', Raphinha 72'	36,293	Darren England	15th	
29 August 2021	Burnley	Away	1–1	Bamford 86'	18,665	Michael Oliver	15th	
12 September 2021	Liverpool	Home	0–3	—	36,507	Craig Pawson	17th	
17 September 2021	Newcastle United	Away	1–1	Raphinha 13'	50,407	Mike Dean	17th	
25 September 2021	West Ham United	Home	1–2	Raphinha 19'	36,417	Kevin Friend	18th	
2 October 2021	Watford	Home	1–0	Llorente 18'	36,261	Simon Hooper	16th	
16 October 2021	Southampton	Away	0–1	—	30,506	David Coote	17th	
23 October 2021	Wolverhampton Wanderers	Home	1–1	Rodrigo 90+4'	36,475	Robert Jones	17th	
31 October 2021	Norwich City	Away	2–1	Raphinha 56', Rodrigo 60'	26,913	Anthony Taylor	17th	
7 November 2021	Leicester City	Home	1–1	Raphinha 26'	36,478	Darren England	15th	
21 November 2021	Tottenham Hotspur	Away	1–2	James 44'	58,989	Andre Marriner	17th	
27 November 2021	Brighton & Hove Albion	Away	0–0	—	31,166	Craig Pawson	17th	
30 November 2021	Crystal Palace	Home	1–0	Raphinha 90+3'	35,558	Kevin Friend	15th	
5 December 2021	Brentford	Home	2–2	Roberts 27', Bamford 90+6'	35,639	David Coote	16th	
11 December 2021	Chelsea	Away	2–3	Raphinha 28', Gelhardt 83'	39,959	Chris Kavanagh	15th	
14 December 2021	Manchester City	Away	0–7	—	52,401	Paul Tierney	16th	
18 December 2021	Arsenal	Home	1–4	Raphinha 75' pen	36,166	Andre Marriner	16th	
2 January 2022	Burnley	Home	3–1	Harrison 39', Dallas 77', James 90+2'	36,083	Paul Tierney	16th	
16 January 2022	West Ham United	Away	3–2	Harrison (3) 10', 37', 60'	59,951	Mike Dean	15th	
22 January 2022	Newcastle United	Home	0–1	—	36,405	Chris Kavanagh	15th	
9 February 2022	Aston Villa	Away	3–3	James (2) 9', 45+2', Llorente 63'	41,927	Jarred Gillett	15th	
12 February 2022	Everton	Away	0–3	—	39,150	Graham Scott	15th	
20 February 2022	Manchester United	Home	2–4	Rodrigo 53', Raphinha 54'	36,715	Paul Tierney	15th	
23 February 2022	Liverpool	Away	0–6	—	53,018	Michael Oliver	15th	
26 February 2022	Tottenham Hotspur	Home	0–4	—	36,599	Craig Pawson	16th	
5 March 2022	Leicester City	Away	0–1	—	32,236	David Coote	16th	
10 March 2022	Aston Villa	Home	0–3	—	36,400	Simon Hooper	16th	
13 March 2022	Norwich City	Home	2–1	Rodrigo 14', Gelhardt 90+4'	36,321	Stuart Attwell	16th	
18 March 2022	Wolverhampton Wanderers	Away	3–2	Harrison 63', Rodrigo 66', Ayling 90+1'	31,842	Kevin Friend	16th	
2 April 2022	Southampton	Home	1–1	Harrison 29'	36,580	Anthony Taylor	16th	
9 April 2022	Watford	Away	3–0	Raphinha 21', Rodrigo 73', Harrison 85'	20,957	Andre Marriner	16th	
25 April 2022	Crystal Palace	Away	0–0	—	25,357	Darren England	16th	
30 April 2022	Manchester City	Home	0–4	—	35,771	Paul Tierney	17th	
8 May 2022	Arsenal	Away	1–2	Llorente 66'	60,108	Chris Kavanagh	18th	
11 May 2022	Chelsea	Home	0–3	—	36,549	Anthony Taylor	18th	
15 May 2022	Brighton & Hove Albion	Home	1–1	Struijk 90+2'	36,638	Mike Dean	18th	
22 May 2022	Brentford	Away	2–1	Raphinha 56' pen, Harrison 90+4'	16,957	Paul Tierney	17th	

=== FA Cup ===
Leeds were drawn away to West Ham United in the third round.

Win	Draw	Loss

Date	Round	Opponent	Venue	Result F–A	Scorers	Attendance	Referee	Ref.
9 January 2022	Third round	West Ham United	Away	0–2		54,303	Stuart Attwell	

=== EFL Cup ===
The second round draw was made by Andy Townsend and Jobi McAnuff, live on Sky Sports. Leeds were drawn at home against Crewe Alexandra of the EFL League One. The match was played on 24 August 2021 at 19:45 BST and saw Leeds win 3–0. The draw for the third round was held on 25 August and was made by Kevin Phillips and Kevin Campbell. Leeds were drawn against Fulham of the EFL Championship at Craven Cottage. The match will be played during the week commencing 21 September 2021. On 22 September, Leeds were drawn away to Arsenal in the fourth round.

Win	Draw	Loss

Date	Round	Opponent	Venue	Result F–A	Scorers	Attendance	Referee	Ref.
24 August 2021	Second round	Crewe Alexandra	Home	3–0	Phillips 79', Harrison (2) 85', 90'	34,154	Ben Speedie	
21 September 2021	Third round	Fulham	Away	0–0 (5–6 p)	—	11,299	Tim Robinson	
26 October 2021	Fourth round	Arsenal	Away	0–2	—	59,126	Andre Marriner	

== Player statistics ==
As of 22 May 2022

The plus (+) symbol denotes an appearance as a substitute, hence 2+1 indicates two appearances in the starting XI and one appearance as a substitute.

No.	Pos	Nat	Player	Total		Premier League		FA Cup		League Cup	
No.	Pos	Nat	Player	Apps	Goals	Apps	Goals	Apps	Goals	Apps	Goals
1	GK	(France) FRA	Illan Meslier	42	0	38	0	1	0	3	0
2	DF	(England) ENG	Luke Ayling	28	2	26	2	1	0	0+1	0
3	DF	(Spain) ESP	Junior Firpo	27	0	19+5	0	1	0	2	0
4	MF	(England) ENG	Adam Forshaw	26	0	17+5	0	0+1	0	2+1	0
5	DF	(Germany) GER	Robin Koch	21	0	17+3	0	1	0	0	0
6	DF	(Scotland) SCO	Liam Cooper	22	0	21	0	0	0	0+1	0
9	FW	(England) ENG	Patrick Bamford	10	2	7+2	2	0	0	0+1	0
10	MF	(Brazil) BRA	Raphinha	36	11	34+1	11	0+1	0	0	0
11	FW	(Wales) WAL	Tyler Roberts	26	1	7+16	1	0	0	3	0
13	GK	(Norway) NOR	Kristoffer Klaesson	1	0	0+1	0	0	0	0	0
14	DF	(Spain) ESP	Diego Llorente	31	3	28	3	1	0	2	0
15	DF	(Northern Ireland) NIR	Stuart Dallas	37	1	34	1	0+1	0	2	0
17	FW	(Angola) ANG	Hélder Costa	2	0	0+1	0	0	0	1	0
19	FW	(Spain) ESP	Rodrigo	34	6	27+4	6	0	0	3	0
20	MF	(Wales) WAL	Daniel James	35	4	29+3	4	1	0	2	0
21	DF	(Netherlands) NED	Pascal Struijk	31	1	22+7	1	0	0	2	0
22	MF	(England) ENG	Jack Harrison	38	10	32+3	8	1	0	2	2
23	MF	(England) ENG	Kalvin Phillips	23	1	18+2	0	0	0	3	1
26	MF	(England) ENG	Lewis Bate	4	0	1+2	0	1	0	0	0
30	FW	(England) ENG	Joe Gelhardt	22	2	5+15	2	0	0	0+2	0
33	DF	(Norway) NOR	Leo Hjelde	3	0	0+2	0	1	0	0	0
35	DF	(England) ENG	Charlie Cresswell	6	0	1+4	0	0	0	1	0
37	DF	(England) ENG	Cody Drameh	5	0	1+2	0	0+1	0	1	0
38	MF	(Netherlands) NED	Crysencio Summerville	9	0	0+6	0	0+1	0	1+1	0
39	MF	(Scotland) SCO	Stuart McKinstry	2	0	0+1	0	0	0	0+1	0
42	FW	(England) ENG	Sam Greenwood	9	0	1+6	0	1	0	0+1	0
43	MF	(Poland) POL	Mateusz Klich	37	1	26+7	1	1	0	1+2	0
45	MF	(Scotland) SCO	Liam McCarron	1	0	0+1	0	0	0	0	0
46	MF	(England) ENG	Jamie Shackleton	16	0	7+7	0	0	0	2	0

Last updated: 22 May 2022
Source: Soccerbase

In addition, Jack Jenkins and Academy players Kris Moore, Nohan Kenneh and Archie Gray were unused substitutes included in at least one matchday squad.

== See also ==
- 2021–22 in English football
- List of Leeds United F.C. seasons
