= Illan Meslier =

French footballer (born 2000)

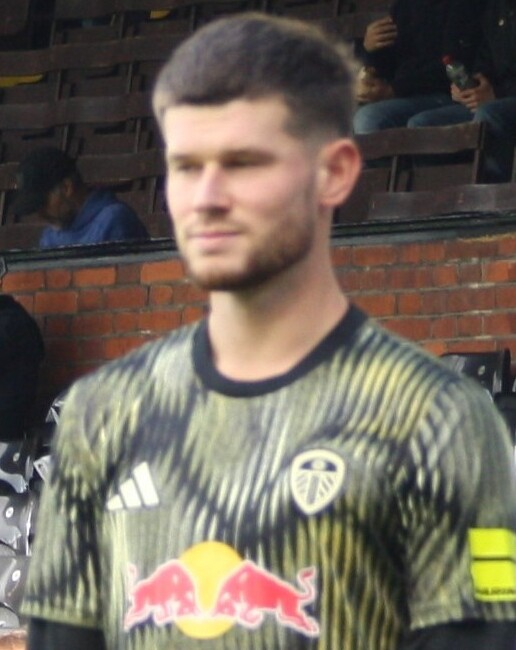
- Meslier with Leeds United in 2025

Personal information
- Full name: Illan Stéphane Meslier
- Date of birth: 2 March 2000 (age 26)
- Place of birth: Lorient, France
- Height: 1.97 m (6 ft 6 in)
- Position: Goalkeeper

Team information
- Current team: Arsenal
- Number: 30

Youth career
- 2006–2009: Merlevenez
- 2009–2019: Lorient

Senior career*
Years	Team	Apps	(Gls)
2017–2018	Lorient II	17	(0)
2018–2020	Lorient	28	(0)
2019–2020	→ Leeds United (loan)	10	(0)
2020–2026	Leeds United	190	(0)
2026–	Arsenal	0	(0)

International career
2018	France U18	3	(0)
2018	France U19	5	(0)
2019	France U20	4	(0)
2021–2023	France U21	13	(0)
- * Club domestic league appearances and goals as of 23:31, 29 March 2025 (UTC)

Illan Stéphane Meslier (/ˌmɛlˈjeɪ/; French pronunciation: [məlje]) (born 2 March 2000) is a French professional footballer who plays as a goalkeeper for Premier League club Arsenal.

== Early life ==
Illan Stéphane Meslier was born on 2 March 2000 in Lorient, Brittany, France.

== Club career ==
=== Lorient ===
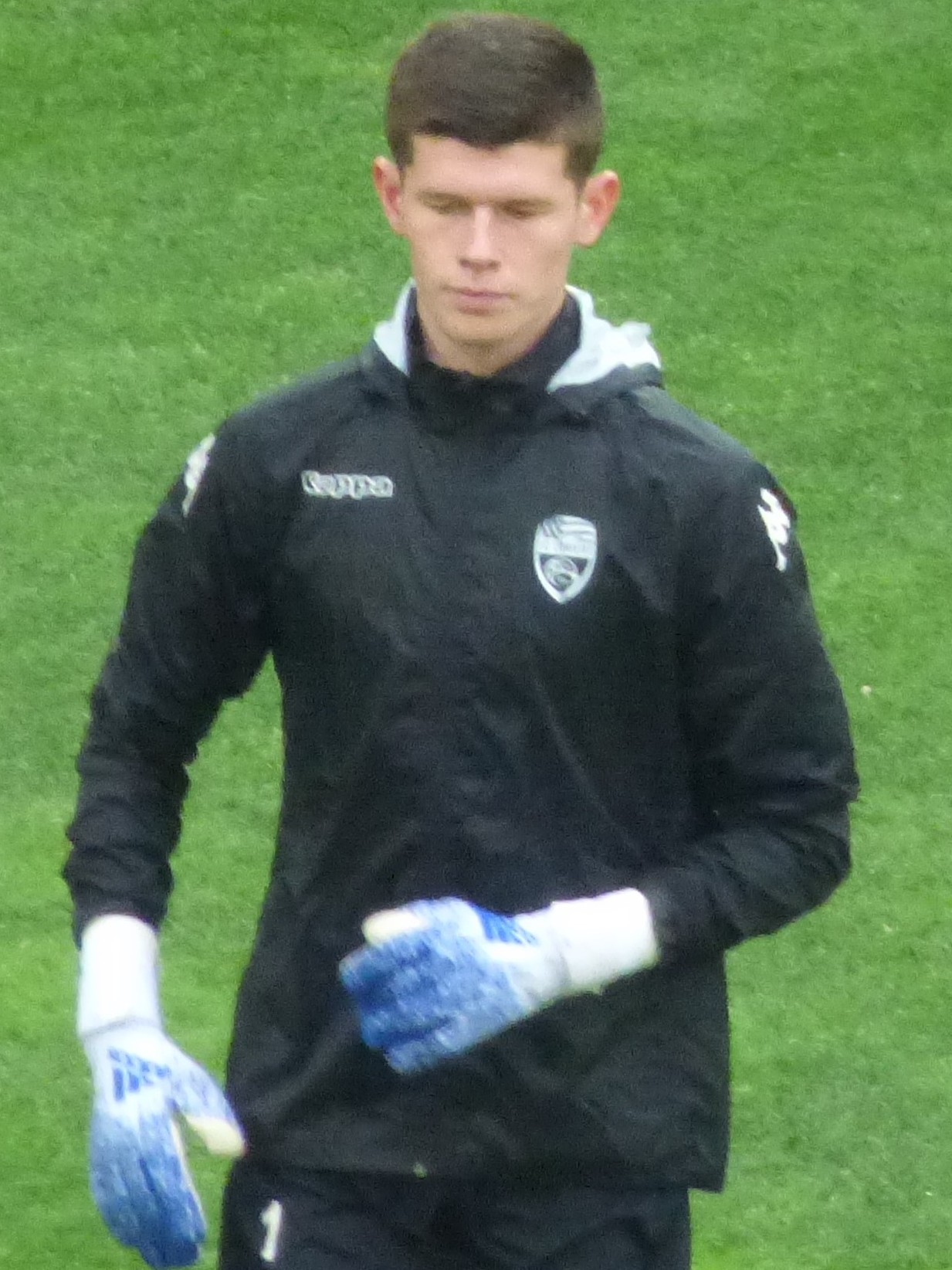
Meslier warming up for Lorient in 2019

Meslier began playing football with his local club Merlevenez at the age of six, and after a successful match against Lorient joined their academy. On 1 February 2018, he signed his first professional contract with Lorient. In July 2018, Lorient rejected a €10 million bid from Ligue 1 side Monaco for Meslier. He also received interest from Premier League side Chelsea.

He stayed at Lorient, and shortly made his professional debut under then-manager Mickaël Landreau for Lorient in a 1–0 Coupe de la Ligue win over Valenciennes on 14 August 2018. He kept a clean sheet consecutively in his first five games as a professional, conceding his first ever goal in his 6th game against Paris FC. He saved an injury time penalty from Clermont player Manuel Perez in Lorient's 1–0 win against Clermont. He solidified his place as the club's number 1 keeper during the 2018–19 season, playing 30 times in all competitions, keeping eleven clean sheets. With his form helping Lorient finish sixth in 2018–19 Ligue 2, narrowly missing out on the playoffs due to goal difference compared with Lens.

=== Leeds United ===
==== 2019–20 season ====
On 8 August 2019, Meslier moved to England and signed for then EFL Championship club Leeds United, on a season-long loan, with Leeds also having the option to buy Meslier on a permanent deal. He started the season as second-choice goalkeeper behind Kiko Casilla and competing with Kamil Miazek for a place on the bench, and Meslier gained a reputation as a penalty saving expert after saving three separate penalties for Leeds United under-23's by December that year.

On 4 January 2020, then head coach Marcelo Bielsa announced that Meslier would make his debut on 6 January in Leeds' FA Cup tie against Premier League side Arsenal. With Meslier putting in an impressive performance against the Premier League side in a 1–0 defeat on his debut, he was praised for his distribution and his saves during the match. On 29 February 2020, he made his league debut for Leeds in a 4–0 victory away at Hull City.

Meslier finished the season as first choice at Leeds after an eight-game suspension to fellow goalkeeper Kiko Casilla, with Meslier keeping seven clean sheets in his 10 league games to help Leeds become Champions and win promotion to the Premier League.

==== 2020–21 season ====
On 23 July 2020, Meslier joined Leeds permanently following their promotion to the Premier League, for a reported £5m transfer fee, signing a three-year contract. Meslier made his 2020–21 Premier League debut in the first match of the season against Liverpool on 12 September 2020, starting in the 3–4 defeat at Anfield to the reigning champions. On 28 September, Meslier was named man of the match in the Yorkshire derby 1–0 win over Sheffield United at Bramall Lane, after making a string of fine saves including a point blank reflex save at 0–0.

On 23 February 2021, Meslier became the first goalkeeper under the age of 21 to record 11 clean sheets in a single Premier League season, eventually finishing the season with 11.

==== 2021–22 season ====
On 13 August 2021, Meslier had signed a new deal with the club, which triggered an extension to his contract running until 2026.

==== 2022–23 season ====
Meslier's performance against Liverpool on 29 October 2022, in which he made nine saves to give his side a 2–1 away win and take them out of the relegation zone, saw him awarded the Premier League Man of the Match award. He made his 100th appearance for Leeds at home on 4 January 2023, in a 2–2 draw with West Ham United.

Meslier conceded 22 goals in seven games in April of that year, during which the team took just four points from a possible 21 which resulted in the dismissal of head coach Javi Gracia. With the arrival of Sam Allardyce in May 2023 — Leeds’ fourth manager of the 2022–23 season — Meslier saw no further action in the first team, being replaced by Joel Robles for the final four games of the season, from which the team gained a single point, demoting the side to the EFL Championship for the following season.

==== 2023–24 season ====
Under newly appointed Leeds manager Daniel Farke, Meslier returned to being first-choice goalkeeper in the Championship. On 26 December 2023, Meslier received a red card after pushing Milutin Osmajić in the face in a match against Preston North End. Leeds finished 3rd overall in the Championship season, qualifying for the playoffs and making it through to the play-off final at Wembley Stadium for a chance to return to the Premier League. Meslier started the play-off final against Southampton, in which Leeds lost 1–0 to stay in the Championship.

==== 2024–25 season ====
Meslier remained as first-choice goalkeeper for Leeds in the 2024–25 season under Farke, playing in 39 of a possible 46 league matches as his side finished as Champions and earned direct promotion back into the Premier League. However, he was dropped for the final 7 matches of the season in favour of Karl Darlow after an error-filled performance on 29 March 2025 against Swansea City, leading to speculation over his future at the club.

==== 2025–26 season and departure ====
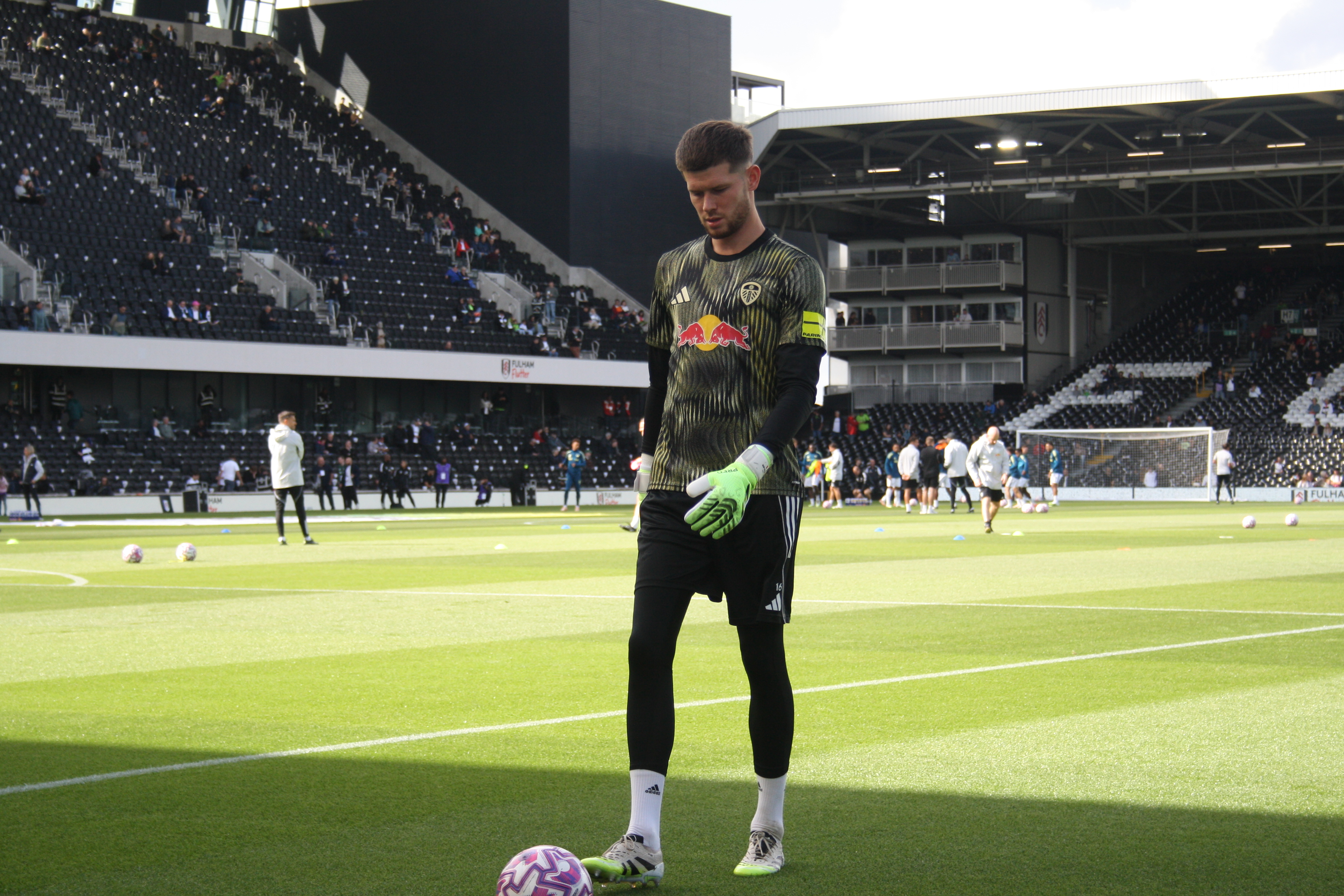
Meslier warming up for Leeds United in 2025

Leeds' return to the Premier League sparked some significant player movement in and out within the squad, including the transfer of goalkeeper Lucas Perri from Ligue 1 club Lyon for a reported £15.6 million fee, igniting rumours that Meslier's exit from the club was imminent.

Boyhood club Lorient and Serie A side Como were rumoured to be considering bids for Meslier, but by the end of the summer transfer window no transfer emerged. Meslier was registered in the Leeds squad for the 2025–26 season, but he was considered to be third-choice goalkeeper behind Perri and Darlow and was assigned the number 16 shirt after Perri claimed the number 1, the number Meslier had worn at the club since his arrival in 2019.

In June 2026, Leeds confirmed that Meslier had left the club at the end of the season following the expiration of his contract.

=== Arsenal ===
==== 2026–27 season ====
On 9 July 2026, Meslier signed for reigning Premier League champions Arsenal, and he was assigned the number 30. On 27 October 2026, he made his debut for the club, in a penalty shootout defeat to Fleetwood Town in the EFL Cup following a 1–1 draw at Highbury Stadium.

== International career ==
Meslier has been capped at international level by France, all the way up to France U21s. He was also part of the France U20 squad for the 2019 FIFA U-20 World Cup playing as the first choice goalkeeper in May 2019.

In November 2019, Meslier was called up the France U21 squad and was named as an unused substitute in a 3–1 defeat against Switzerland U21's on 19 November 2019. He was called up again to the France U21 squad in August 2020 for fixtures against Georgia U21 and Azerbaijan U21. He made his debut for the under-21 team playing in the quarter final against the Netherlands on 31 May 2021.

== Style of play ==
Due to his appearance and physical stature, Meslier's goalkeeping style has been compared to that of Belgian goalkeeper Thibaut Courtois.

== Career statistics ==
As of match played 27 October 2026

Appearances and goals by club, season and competition
Club	Season	League			National cup (Note: Includes FA Cup)		League cup (Note: Includes Coupe de la Ligue, EFL Cup)		Europe		Other		Total	
Club	Season	Division	Apps	Goals	Apps	Goals	Apps	Goals	Apps	Goals	Apps	Goals	Apps	Goals
Lorient II	2017–18	Championnat National 2	16	0	—		—		—		—		16	0
Lorient II	2018–19	Championnat National 2	1	0	—		—		—		—		1	0
Lorient II	Total		17	0	—		—		—		—		17	0
Lorient	2018–19	Ligue 2	28	0	0	0	2	0	—		—		30	0
Leeds United (loan)	2019–20	Championship	10	0	1	0	0	0	—		—		11	0
Leeds United	2020–21	Premier League	35	0	0	0	0	0	—		—		35	0
Leeds United	2021–22	Premier League	38	0	1	0	3	0	—		—		42	0
Leeds United	2022–23	Premier League	34	0	3	0	1	0	—		—		38	0
Leeds United	2023–24	Championship	44	0	3	0	0	0	—		3 (Note: Appearances in Championship play-offs)	0	50	0
Leeds United	2024–25	Championship	39	0	0	0	0	0	—		—		39	0
Leeds United	2025–26	Premier League	0	0	0	0	0	0	—		—		0	0
Leeds United	Leeds total		200	0	8	0	4	0	—		3	0	215	0
Arsenal	2026–27	Premier League	0	0	0	0	1	0	0	0	0	0	1	0
Career total			245	0	8	0	7	0	0	0	3	0	263	0

== Honours ==
Leeds United

- EFL Championship: 2019–20, 2024–25

Arsenal

- FA Community Shield: 2026

Individual

- Leeds United Young Player of the Year: 2020–21
- EFL Championship Golden Glove: 2023–24
- PFA Team of the Year: 2023–24 Championship
