= Joe Gelhardt =

English footballer (born 2002)

- Gelhardt in 2026

Personal information
- Full name: Joseph Paul Gelhardt
- Date of birth: 4 May 2002 (age 24)
- Place of birth: Liverpool, England
- Height: 5 ft 9 in (1.75 m)
- Position: Attacking midfielder

Team information
- Current team: Hull City
- Number: 11

Youth career
- 2013–2018: Wigan Athletic

Senior career*
Years	Team	Apps	(Gls)
2018–2020	Wigan Athletic	19	(1)
2020–2026	Leeds United	47	(2)
2023	→ Sunderland (loan)	18	(3)
2025	→ Hull City (loan)	20	(5)
2025–2026	→ Hull City (loan)	39	(14)
2026–	Hull City	2	(1)

International career
2018	England U16	6	(3)
2018–2019	England U17	15	(12)
2019–2020	England U18	6	(4)
2021	England U20	1	(2)
- * Club domestic league appearances and goals as of 17:59, 11 October 2026 (UTC)

Joseph Paul Gelhardt (born 4 May 2002) is an English professional footballer who plays as a forward for Premier League club Hull City.

A youth product of Wigan Athletic, Gelhardt made his senior debut for the club in August 2018 aged 16. Two years later, he moved to newly-promoted Premier League side Leeds United. He made his debut for the club in September 2021, scoring his first goal for the club three months later. After playing regularly for the club during the 2021–22 season, he moved to Sunderland on loan in 2023. Later, in January 2025, he was loaned to Hull City. After another loan spell at Hull for the 2025–26 season, Gelhardt signed for the club permanently in August 2026.

== Club career ==
=== Wigan Athletic ===
Born in Liverpool, Gelhardt grew up in Netherton, Merseyside, where he attended Chesterfield High School. He joined Wigan Athletic at the age of ten in 2013, progressing through the youth teams before being offered a scholarship deal in 2017. He made his professional debut for Wigan Athletic on 14 August 2018, appearing as a substitute against Rotherham United in the first round of the EFL Cup.

On 24 August 2018, he signed his first professional contract with the club. He made his League debut on 27 April 2019, appearing as a half-time substitute against Birmingham City. On 14 September, he scored his first senior goal for the club in a 2–2 draw against Hull City.

Gelhardt made 19 appearances in all competitions with 18 coming in the EFL Championship during the 2019–20 season, as Wigan were relegated from the Championship after a 12-point penalty saw them drop into the relegation places.

=== Leeds United ===
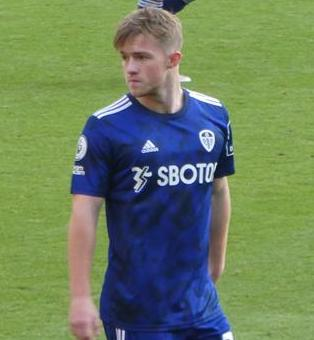
Gelhardt playing for Leeds United in 2022.

On 10 August 2020, Gelhardt signed a four-year contract with newly-promoted Premier League club Leeds United. He made his senior debut for Leeds United on 21 September 2021 as a second-half substitute for Mateusz Klich in the EFL Cup third round match against EFL Championship side Fulham. The match ended 0–0 with Leeds winning 6–5 on penalties, Gelhardt scoring the seventh of Leeds' eight penalties. Gelhardt made his Premier League debut for Leeds on 16 October as a second-half substitute in the 1–0 defeat to Southampton. On 11 December, Gelhardt scored his first goal for Leeds in a 2–3 away league defeat to rivals Chelsea and he netted his second on 13 March 2022: a dramatic added-time 2–1 winner at Elland Road against Norwich City.

In the 2022–23 season, Gelhardt's 10 appearances through the end of October were mostly limited to late substitutions, primarily for teammates Luis Sinisterra and Rodrigo, allowing minimal time for him to impress himself on the direction of the game.

Under new manager Daniel Farke, Gerhardt did not feature prominently in the 2023–24 season, and even less frequently during the first half of the 2024–25 season, making only two league appearances as a late substitute.

==== Loan to Sunderland ====
On 27 January 2023, Gelhardt joined Championship play-off pushing side Sunderland on loan until the end of the 2022–23 season. He scored his first goal for Sunderland on 21 February in a 2–1 defeat to Rotherham United.

==== Loan to Hull City ====
On 15 January 2025, Gelhardt joined fellow Championship side Hull City on loan until the end of the 2024–25 season. He made his debut on 18 January, as a 63rd-minute substitute for Mason Burstow in the 1–0 away win against Millwall. He made his full debut on 21 January, scoring Hull's goal in the 2–1 home defeat by Queens Park Rangers. On 9 August, Gelhardt returned to Hull City on a season-long loan spell from Leeds.

Gelhardt tallied a career-high 14 goals and 4 assists in the EFL Championship on loan with Hull City during the 2025–26 season and helped the club get promoted back to the Premier League for the first time since 2017 with a win in the play-off final against Middlesbrough.

=== Permanent move to Hull City ===
On 15 August 2026, Gelhardt left Leeds and signed a four-year contract with Premier League club Hull City, for a fee of £6.5 million.

== International career ==
Gelhardt scored for the England under-16 team in a 3–3 draw against Brazil at the 2018 Montaigu Tournament.

In September 2018, Gelhardt scored twice for the England under-17 team against Norway and also came off the bench to score against Belgium. The following month saw him score against the United States and twice in a game against Russia. In March 2019, Gelhardt scored in a 3–2 win against Denmark that confirmed qualification for the 2019 UEFA European Under-17 Championship. In April 2019, Gelhardt was included in the England U17 squad for the 2019 UEFA European Under-17 Championships and scored in a 3–1 victory over Sweden under-17s as the Young Lions bowed out of the competition at the group stage.

Gelhardt made his U18 debut as a 79th-minute substitute during the 3–2 win over Australia at Hinckley Leicester Road on 6 September 2019. On 2 October 2020, Gelhardt was named in the England U19 squad.

On 6 September 2021, Gelhardt made his debut for the England U20s scoring a brace during a 6–1 victory over Romania U20s at St. George's Park.

Gelhardt received his first call up to the England U21s on 4 October 2021, as an injury replacement for Noni Madueke.

== Style of play ==
Gelhardt is left footed and plays mainly as a striker; he can also play as a second striker, wide forward or as an attacking midfielder. He is known for his dribbling, power and build-up play. Early in his career his style was compared to that of Wayne Rooney.

== Personal life ==
Gelhardt supported Premier League club Liverpool growing up, particularly admiring former striker Fernando Torres.

== Career statistics ==
As of 11 October 2026

Appearances and goals by club, season and competition
Club	Season	League			FA Cup		EFL Cup		Other		Total	
Club	Season	Division	Apps	Goals	Apps	Goals	Apps	Goals	Apps	Goals	Apps	Goals
Wigan Athletic	2018–19	Championship	1	0	0	0	1	0	—		2	0
Wigan Athletic	2019–20	Championship	18	1	1	0	0	0	—		19	1
Wigan Athletic	Total		19	1	1	0	1	0	—		21	1
Leeds United U21	2020–21	—			—		—		1 (Note: Appearance(s) in EFL Trophy)	0	1	0
Leeds United U21	2021–22	—			—		—		1	0	1	0
Leeds United U21	2022–23	—			—		—		2	2	2	2
Leeds United U21	Total		0	0	0	0	0	0	4	2	4	2
Leeds United	2020–21	Premier League	0	0	0	0	0	0	—		0	0
Leeds United	2021–22	Premier League	20	2	0	0	2	0	—		22	2
Leeds United	2022–23	Premier League	15	0	2	0	2	0	—		19	0
Leeds United	2023–24	Championship	10	0	1	0	2	1	—		13	1
Leeds United	2024–25	Championship	2	0	0	0	1	0	—		3	0
Leeds United	Total		47	2	3	0	7	1	—		57	3
Sunderland (loan)	2022–23	Championship	18	3	—		—		2 (Note: Appearances in Championship play-offs)	0	20	3
Hull City (loan)	2024–25	Championship	20	5	—		—		—		20	5
Hull City (loan)	2025–26	Championship	39	14	1	0	1	0	3	1	44	15
Hull City (loan)	Total		59	19	1	0	1	0	3	1	64	20
Hull City	2026–27	Premier League	2	1	0	0	1	0	—		3	1
Career total			145	26	5	0	10	1	9	3	169	30

== Honours ==
Hull City

- EFL Championship play-offs: 2026
