= 2022–23 Leeds United F.C. season =

Leeds United
2022–23 season
- Chairman: Andrea Radrizzani
- Head coach: Jesse Marsch (until 6 February); Michael Skubala (between 6–21 February); Javi Gracia (from 21 Feb to 3 May); Sam Allardyce (from 3 May)
- Stadium: Elland Road
- Premier League: 19th (relegated)
- FA Cup: Fifth round
- EFL Cup: Third round
- Top goalscorer: League: Rodrigo (13); All: Rodrigo (15)
- Highest home attendance: 36,955 vs Newcastle United (13 May 2023, Premier League)
- Lowest home attendance: 34,465 vs Cardiff City (18 January 2023, FA Cup)
- Average home league attendance: 36,502
Home colours	Away colours	Third colours

The 2022–23 season saw Leeds United competing in the Premier League for a third successive season.

== Review ==
=== August ===
Leeds began their Premier League campaign against Wolverhampton Wanderers at Elland Road on 6 August, winning by a score of 2–1. Daniel Podence opened the scoring for Wolves in the 6th minute. Before the half-time interval, Rodrigo levelled the scores. Leeds went ahead in the 74th minute after Rayan Aït-Nouri turned Patrick Bamford's cross, intended for Brenden Aaronson, into his own goal. A week later, Leeds drew 2–2 against Southampton at St Mary's Stadium, with Rodrigo scoring at the near post from a cross shortly after half-time before doubling Leeds' advantage in the 60th minute with a back post header from a corner. Southampton scored in the 72nd minute after Adam Armstrong's pass found Joe Aribo, who took the ball around Leeds goalkeeper Illan Meslier to score. Southampton equalised in the 81st minute after Sékou Mara found Kyle Walker-Peters who scored from a tight angle. Leeds next hosted rivals Chelsea on 21 August, winning 3–0. Brenden Aaronson gave Leeds the lead when he pressured Chelsea goalkeeper Édouard Mendy into giving away the ball for Aaronson to tap in on the 33rd minute, scoring his first goal for the club. Rodrigo added Leeds' second minutes later heading in from a Jack Harrison cross. Harrison added Leeds' third on the 69th minute to complete their first win over Chelsea in nearly twenty years. Kalidou Koulibaly was shown a second yellow card and subsequently sent off for Chelsea, for bringing down Joe Gelhardt in the 84th minute. The result moved Leeds up to 3rd in the Premier League table. Leeds defeated League One club Barnsley 3–1 at Elland Road in the EFL Cup second round on 24 August, with Luis Sinisterra scoring Leeds' first goal, before a brace from Mateusz Klich. The team lost their first match of the season on 28 August, being defeated 1–0 away to Brighton & Hove Albion after Pascal Groß scored a powerful right-footed shot in the 66th minute. This was followed by a 1–1 draw at home to Everton on 30 August, with Luis Sinisterra's goal from the edge of the box in the 55th minute cancelling out Anthony Gordon's first-half opener.

=== September ===
Leeds were defeated 5–2 away to Brentford in their opening match of September. Ivan Toney opened the scoring for Brentford in the 30th minute with a penalty kick after foul on him by Luis Sinisterra, before doubling Brentford's lead three minutes before the half-time interval with a free-kick. Sinisterra pulled a goal back in first-half stoppage time with a "composed low finish", before Toney completed his hat-trick, capitalising on an error from Diego Llorente to chip Leeds goalkeeper Illan Meslier. Leeds head coach Jesse Marsch was sent off in the 64th minute. Marc Roca scored a second goal for Leeds in the 79th minute before late goals for the hosts from Bryan Mbeumo and Yoane Wissa. Their following two matches against Nottingham Forest at Elland Road scheduled for 12 September and against rivals Manchester United at Old Trafford scheduled for 18 September were postponed due to the death of Queen Elizabeth II on 8 September.

=== October ===
Leeds began October by hosting Aston Villa at Elland Road on 2 October, drawing 0–0. Luis Sinisterra was shown a second yellow card and subsequently sent off for Leeds, following a foul on Jacob Ramsey in the 48th minute. Despite taking an early lead away to Crystal Palace, with Pascal Struijk scoring a 10th-minute goal after Brenden Aaronson's shot hit the post, Odsonne Édouard scored a 24th-minute equaliser following a free-kick by Michael Olise, before Eberechi Eze won the game 2–1 for the hosts in the 76th minute. Leeds were again defeated the following week at home to Arsenal; Bukayo Saka's 35th-minute goal gave Arsenal the lead, before substitute Patrick Bamford both had a goal disallowed and missed a penalty in the second half for Leeds as they lost 1–0. Leeds then travelled to the King Power Stadium to play Leicester City on 20 October, losing 2–0. Robin Koch opened the scoring for Leicester in the 16th minute with an own goal following a low-cross by Dennis Praet, Harvey Barnes then scored a second for Leicester in the 35th minute following a pass by Kiernan Dewsbury-Hall. Leeds then hosted Fulham at Elland Road on 23 October, losing 3–2. Rodrigo opened the scoring for Leeds in the 20th minute following a shot by Jack Harrison, Aleksandar Mitrović the equalised for Fulham in the 26th minute following a corner by Andreas Pereira, Bobby Decordova-Reid then put Fulham ahead in the 74th minute following a cross by Pereira, Willian then scored a third for Fulham in the 84th minute following a pass by Harrison Reed, Crysencio Summerville scored a second for Leeds in second-half stoppage time following a pass by Joe Gelhardt. Leeds then travelled to Anfield to play Liverpool on 29 October, winning 2–1. Rodrigo opened the scoring for Leeds in the 4th minute after Brenden Aaronson forced Joe Gomez into a back-pass to Alisson Becker which he missed giving Rodrigo a tap-in, Mohamed Salah then equalised for Liverpool in the 14th minute following a cross by Andrew Robertson, Crysencio Summerville scored the winner for Leeds in second-half stoppage time after Patrick Bamford brought down a cross by Wilfried Gnonto.

=== November ===
Leeds began November by hosting Bournemouth at Elland Road on 5 November, winning 4–3. Rodrigo opened the scoring for Leeds in the 3rd minute with a penalty following a foul on Crysencio Summerville by Marcos Senesi, Marcus Tavernier then equalised for Bournemouth in the 7th minute following a cross by Ryan Fredericks and then Philip Billing put Bournemouth ahead following a shot by Tavernier that was saved by Leeds goalkeeper Illan Meslier in the 19th minute, Dominic Solanke then scored a third for Bournemouth in the 48th minute following a low-cross by Tavernier. Sam Greenwood then pulled a goal back for Leeds in the 60th minute with long-range shot following a cross by Pascal Struijk, Liam Cooper then equalised for Leeds in the 68th minute following a corner by Greenwood, Summerville scored the winner for Leeds in the 84th minute following a pass by Wilfried Gnonto. Leeds were defeated 1–0 away to Wolverhampton Wanderers in the EFL Cup third round, with Boubacar Traoré scoring the only goal of the match in 85th minute. Leeds then travelled to the Tottenham Hotspur Stadium to play Tottenham Hotspur on 12 November, losing 4–3. Crysencio Summerville opened the scoring for Leeds in the 10th minute following a pass by Brenden Aaronson, Harry Kane then equalised for Spurs in the 25th minute, Rodrigo then put Leeds ahead three minutes before half-time following a header towards him by Rasmus Kristensen, Ben Davies equalised for Spurs in the 51st minute, Rodrigo then put Leeds ahead again in the 76th minute, Rodrigo Bentancur then equalised for Spurs again in the 81st minute following a cross by Matt Doherty and Bentancur then scored winner for Spurs in the 83rd minute following a pass by Dejan Kulusevski. Tyler Adams was then sent off for Leeds in the 87th minute following a foul on Yves Bissouma.

=== December ===
Leeds began December by hosting Manchester City at Elland Road on 28 December, losing 3–1. Rodri opened the scoring for Manchester City in first-half stoppage time following a shot by Riyad Mahrez which was saved by Leeds goalkeeper Illan Meslier, Erling Haaland then scored a second for Manchester City in the 51st minute following a pass across goal by Jack Grealish, Haaland then scored a third for Manchester City in the 64th minute following another pass by Grealish. Pascal Struijk then scored a consolation goal for Leeds in the 73rd minute following a corner by Sam Greenwood. Leeds then travelled to St James' Park to play Newcastle United on New Year's Eve, drawing 0–0.

=== January ===
Leeds began January by hosting West Ham United at Elland Road on 4 January, drawing 2–2. After Wilfried Gnonto opened the scoring for Leeds with his first goal for the club in the 27th minute from a pass by Crysencio Summerville, Lucas Paquetá equalised for West Ham in first-half stoppage time for a penalty awarded following a foul on Jarrod Bowen by Pascal Struijk. Gianluca Scamacca then put West Ham ahead in the 46th minute after Brenden Aaronson gave the ball to him and Rodrigo then equalised for Leeds in the 70th minute following a pass by Jack Harrison. Leeds then travelled to the Cardiff City Stadium to play Championship club Cardiff City in the FA Cup third round on 8 January, drawing 2–2. Jaden Philogene opened the scoring for Cardiff, with Sheyi Ojo scoring a second seven minutes later. Rodrigo pulled a goal back for Leeds following a cross from Sam Greenwood. Sonny Perkins' equaliser for Leeds in second-half stoppage time, sent the match to a replay at Elland Road. Leeds would go on to win the replay 5–2 on 18 January. Wilfried Gnonto opened the scoring just 26 seconds in, before Rodrigo made it 2–0. Gnonto then scored his second of the night, with Patrick Bamford also scoring twice, after coming on as a substitute. Callum Robinson scored a pair for Cardiff, one of which was a penalty kick awarded for a handball by Marc Roca, but Leeds progressed to the fourth round of the Cup for the first time since the 2016–17 season under the management of Garry Monk. Before their FA Cup replay with Cardiff, Leeds travelled to Villa Park to play Aston Villa on 13 January and lost 2–1, with Leon Bailey opening the scoring for the home team in the third minute, following a pass from Boubacar Kamara. Emiliano Buendía then added a second for Villa in the 64th minute, following a shot by Bailey that was saved by Illan Meslier and which, after a VAR check for offside, was eventually given as onside. Patrick Bamford scored a consolation goal for Leeds in the 83rd minute, from a pass by Joe Gelhardt, but the result put pressure on Leeds' head coach Jesse Marsch as Leeds now had not won in the league since their victory over Bournemouth in November 2022. Leeds then hosted Brentford at Elland Road on 22 January, drawing 0–0. Leeds ended the month by travelling to the Wham Stadium to play League One club Accrington Stanley in the FA Cup fourth round on 28 January, winning 3–1. Jack Harrison opened the scoring for Leeds in the 23rd minute, scoring from outside the box. Junior Firpo added Leeds' second—and his first goal for the club—in the 66th minute following a pass from Bamford and just minutes later Luis Sinisterra put away Leeds' third. Leslie Adekoya scored a late consolation goal for Accrington, but Leeds progressed to the fifth round for the first time since the 2015–16 season under the management of Steve Evans.

=== February ===
Leeds began February by travelling to the City Ground to play Nottingham Forest on 5 February, losing 1–0. Brennan Johnson scored the only goal of the match in the 14th minute following a free-kick by Morgan Gibbs-White. On 6 February, it was announced that Leeds had sacked head coach Jesse Marsch following their defeat to Forest. He departed with Leeds in 17th place in the Premier League, and only outside the relegation zone on goal difference. Two days later, Leeds began to play back-to-back league matches in the space of four days against their Roses rivals, Manchester United. Michael Skubala took charge of Leeds' trip to Old Trafford on 8 February, drawing 2–2. Wilfried Gnonto put Leeds in front inside the first minute following a pass from Patrick Bamford. Raphaël Varane doubled Leeds' advantage in the 48th minute turning the ball into his own net, following a cross from Crysencio Summerville. Marcus Rashford's 62nd-minute header made it 2–1, following a cross from Diogo Dalot. Jadon Sancho equalised for Manchester United in the 70th minute. On 12 February, the two sides met again this time at Elland Road, with Manchester United winning 2–0 following late goals from Marcus Rashford and Alejandro Garnacho. On 18 February, Leeds travelled to Goodison Park to play Everton, losing 1–0. Séamus Coleman scored the only goal of the game in the 64th minute following a pass from Alex Iwobi. On 21 February, it was announced that Leeds had appointed former Watford boss Javi Gracia as manager subject to a work permit. On 25 February, Leeds hosted Southampton at Elland Road, winning 1–0. Junior Firpo scored the only goal of the game in the 77th minute, following a pass from Jack Harrison. Leeds ended February by travelling to Craven Cottage to play Fulham in the FA Cup fifth round on 28 February, losing 2–0. João Palhinha and Manor Solomon the goalscorers.

=== March ===
Leeds began March by travelling to Stamford Bridge to play Chelsea, losing 1–0. Wesley Fofana scored the only goal of the game from a corner. Leeds hosted Brighton & Hove Albion at Elland Road on 11 March, drawing 2–2. Alexis Mac Allister opened the scoring for Brighton before Patrick Bamford equalised five minutes before halftime. Solly March put the visitors ahead again before Jack Harrison equalised for Leeds for a second time. Leeds ended March by travelling to Molineux to play Wolverhampton Wanderers on 18 March, winning 4–2. Jack Harrison opened the scoring following a pass from Wilfried Gnonto. Luke Ayling extended Leeds’ lead heading in unmarked from a corner. Rasmus Kristensen scored Leeds’ third, seconds after coming on as a substitute. Johnny and Matheus Cunha reduced the deficit for the hosts, Rodrigo ensured Leeds’ second away league win of the season, scoring their fourth.

=== April ===
Leeds began April by travelling to the Emirates Stadium to play league leaders Arsenal, losing 4–1. Gabriel Jesus opened the scoring with a penalty following a tackle from Luke Ayling. Jesus also scored Arsenal's second after a cut-back from Leandro Trossard, before Ben White scored Arsenal's third, following a cross from Gabriel Martinelli. Rasmus Kristensen scored a consolation for Leeds, before Granit Xhaka scored a fourth six minutes from time. This was followed by a 2–1 home victory over relegation rivals Nottingham Forest, where Jack Harrison and Luis Sinisterra scored first-half goals to put Leeds ahead after Orel Mangala opened the scoring for Forest. Leeds then hosted another relegation rival in Crystal Palace on 9 April. A Patrick Bamford header from a corner (his fiftieth goal for the club) saw Leeds take a first-half lead, though Palace equalised through Marc Guéhi minutes before halftime. Palace scored four times in the second half however, with Michael Olise registering a hat-trick of assists to consign Leeds to a 5–1 defeat. A 6–1 defeat at home to Liverpool followed, with Luis Sinisterra scoring Leeds' only goal early in the second half following a mistake by Liverpool defender Ibrahima Konaté. Leeds travelled to Craven Cottage to play Fulham on 22 April, losing 2–1. Harry Wilson opened the scoring for Fulham in the second-half. Andreas Pereira then doubled Fulham's lead. João Palhinha then scored an own goal seven minutes later to act as consolation for Leeds. Leeds hosted Leicester City at Elland Road on 25 April, drawing 1–1. Luis Sinisterra opened the scoring for Leeds following a cross from Jack Harrison. Jamie Vardy then equalised for Leicester City with ten minutes left. Leeds ended April by travelling to the Vitality Stadium to play relegation rivals Bournemouth on 30 April, losing 4–1. Jefferson Lerma opened the scoring for Bournemouth, Lerma then doubled Bournemouth's lead four minutes later with his second goal of the match and with minutes remaining of the first-half Patrick Bamford then pulled a goal back for Leeds. In the second-half, Dominic Solanke then scored a third for the home side. Antoine Semenyo then scored a fourth for Bournemouth.

=== May ===
On 2 May, it was announced that Director of Football Victor Orta had left the club by mutual consent following the club's 4–1 loss to Bournemouth at the Vitality Stadium on 30 April. The following day, manager Javi Gracia left the club, being replaced by former England manager Sam Allardyce; ex Oxford United and Charlton Athletic manager Karl Robinson and former Leeds and Republic of Ireland striker Robbie Keane would join him. Leeds began May by travelling to the Etihad Stadium to play title-chasing Manchester City, losing 2–1 in Allardyce's first match in charge. İlkay Gündoğan opened the scoring for City in the following a cross by Riyad Mahrez, Gündoğan then doubled City's lead in the following another cross by Mahrez and in the second-half following a penalty miss by Gündoğan, Rodrigo then scored a consolation for Leeds with five minutes remaining. Leeds then hosted Newcastle United at Elland Road on 13 May, drawing 2–2. Luke Ayling opened the scoring for Leeds inside the first ten minutes following a cross by Patrick Bamford, then Bamford saw his penalty kick saved by Newcastle goalkeeper Nick Pope following a foul on Junior Firpo. Callum Wilson equalised with a penalty kick following a foul on Alexander Isak by Max Wöber. Wilson then put Newcastle ahead with just over twenty minutes remaining with another penalty kick following a handball by Firpo. Rasmus Kristensen drew Leeds level with just over ten minutes left via a deflection off Newcastle defender Kieran Trippier. Firpo was shown a second yellow card by referee Simon Hooper for a foul on Newcastle forward Anthony Gordon. Leeds travelled to the London Stadium to face West Ham United on 21 May, losing 3–1. Rodrigo opened the scoring for Leeds following a throw in from Weston McKennie. Declan Rice then equalised for West Ham following a cross from Jarrod Bowen. Bowen then put the hosts in-front following a pass from Danny Ings. Manuel Lanzini scored West Ham's third in second half stoppage time following a pass from Lucas Paquetá. Leeds hosted Tottenham Hotspur at Elland Road on 28 May, losing 4–1. Harry Kane opened the scoring for Tottenham with just two minutes played following a cross from Son Heung-min, Pedro Porro then doubled Tottenham's advantage just after the interval. Jack Harrison scored a consolation goal for Leeds following a cross from Georginio Rutter, Kane then added a third for Tottenham. Lucas Moura added a late fourth in second-half added time. Following this result Leeds were relegated to the Championship.

== Pre-season and friendlies ==
Leeds United announced pre-season friendlies against Brisbane Roar, Aston Villa, Crystal Palace, Blackpool, Cagliari, Elche, Real Sociedad and Monaco.

Win Draw Loss Fixtures

7 July 2022 Friendly	Leeds United	4–0	Blackpool	York
19:00 BST	Koch 10'; Firpo 22'; Rodrigo 30'; Joseph 85'	Report		Stadium: LNER Community Stadium; Attendance: 0 (Behind closed doors)

14 July 2022 Queensland Champions Cup	Brisbane Roar	1–2	Leeds United	Robina, Australia
19:45 AEST	Knowles 40'	Report	James 23'; Gelhardt 25'	Stadium: Cbus Super Stadium; Attendance: 27,041; Referee: Jonathan Barreiro

17 July 2022 Queensland Champions Cup	Aston Villa	1–0	Leeds United	Brisbane, Australia
14:35 AEST	Ings 63' (pen.)	Report		Stadium: Suncorp Stadium; Attendance: 40,918; Referee: Adam Kersey

22 July 2022 Friendly	Crystal Palace	1–1	Leeds United	Perth, Australia
19:05 AWST	Mateta 67'	Report	Rodrigo 56' (pen.)	Stadium: Optus Stadium; Attendance: 33,919; Referee: Daniel Elder

31 July 2022 Friendly	Leeds United	6–2	Cagliari	Leeds
18:45 BST	Rodrigo 36', 48', 84'; Bamford 50', 71'; Koch 90'	Report	Lapadula 66'; Luvumbo 68'	Stadium: Elland Road; Attendance: 29,046; Referee: David Coote

8 December 2022 Festa d'Elx Trophy	Elche	1–2	Leeds United	Elche
19:15 GMT	Josan 45'	Report	Gelhardt 60'; Klich 88'	Stadium: Estadio Martínez Valero; Attendance: 12,117; Referee: Jose Martinez

16 December 2022 Friendly	Leeds United	2–1	Real Sociedad	Leeds
19:45 GMT	Struijk 16'; Rodrigo 58'	Report	Zubimendi 10'	Stadium: Elland Road; Attendance: 22,826; Referee: Michael Sailsbury

21 December 2022 Friendly	Leeds United	2–4	Monaco	Leeds
19:00 GMT	Koch 12'; Gelhardt 90+3' (pen.)	Report	Embolo 25', 54'; Martins 47'; Jakobs 52'	Stadium: Elland Road; Attendance: 20,978; Referee: Andrew Madley

== Competitions ==
=== Overall record ===
Competition	First match	Last match	Starting round	Final position	Record							
Competition	First match	Last match	Starting round	Final position	Pld	W	D	L	GF	GA	GD	Win %
Premier League	6 August 2022	28 May 2023	Matchday 1	19th	38	7	10	21	48	78	−30	18.42
FA Cup	8 January 2023	28 February 2023	Third round	Fifth round	4	2	1	1	10	7	+3	50.00
EFL Cup	24 August 2022	9 November 2022	Second round	Third round	2	1	0	1	3	2	+1	50.00
Total					44	10	11	23	61	87	−26	22.73

Source: Soccerway

=== Premier League ===
==== League table ====
Pos	Team	Pld	W	D	L	GF	GA	GD	Pts	Qualification or relegation
16	Nottingham Forest	38	9	11	18	38	68	−30	38	
17	Everton	38	8	12	18	34	57	−23	36	
18	Leicester City (R)	38	9	7	22	51	68	−17	34	Relegation to EFL Championship
19	Leeds United (R)	38	7	10	21	48	78	−30	31	Relegation to EFL Championship
20	Southampton (R)	38	6	7	25	36	73	−37	25	Relegation to EFL Championship

Source: Premier League
Rules for classification: 1) Points; 2) Goal difference; 3) Goals scored; 4) If the champions, relegated teams or qualified teams for UEFA competitions cannot be determined by rules 1 to 3, rules 4.1 to 4.3 are applied – 4.1) Points gained in head-to-head record between such teams; 4.2) Away goals scored in head-to-head record between such teams; 4.3) Play-offs
(R) Relegated

==== Results summary ====
Overall								Home						Away					
Pld	W	D	L	GF	GA	GD	Pts	W	D	L	GF	GA	GD	W	D	L	GF	GA	GD
38	7	10	21	48	78	−30	31	5	7	7	26	37	−11	2	3	14	22	41	−19

Source: Premier League

==== Results by round ====
Round	1	2	3	4	5	6	7	8	9	10	11	12	13	14	15	16	17	18	19	20	21	22	23	24	25	26	27	28	29	30	31	32	33	34	35	36	37	38
Ground	H	A	H	A	H	A	H	A	H	A	H	A	H	A	H	A	H	A	H	A	H	A	H	A	H	A	H	A	A	H	H	A	H	A	A	H	A	H
Result	W	D	W	L	D	L	W	D	D	L	L	L	L	W	W	L	L	D	D	L	D	L	L	L	W	L	D	W	L	L	L	L	D	L	L	D	L	L
Position	7	6	3	5	7	9	9	11	12	14	15	16	17	15	12	15	15	14	14	14	15	17	19	19	17	17	19	14	13	16	16	16	16	17	19	18	19	19

Source: Premier League
A = Away; H = Home; W = Win; D = Draw; L = Loss

==== Matches ====
6 August 2022 1	Leeds United	2–1	Wolverhampton Wanderers	Leeds
15:00 BST	Rodrigo 24'; Aït-Nouri 74' (o.g.)	Report	Podence 6'	Stadium: Elland Road; Attendance: 36,347; Referee: Robert Jones

13 August 2022 2	Southampton	2–2	Leeds United	Southampton
15:00 BST	Aribo 72'; Walker-Peters 81'	Report	Rodrigo 46', 60'	Stadium: St Mary's Stadium; Attendance: 30,815; Referee: Tony Harrington

21 August 2022 3	Leeds United	3–0	Chelsea	Leeds
14:00 BST	Aaronson 33'; Rodrigo 37'; Harrison 69'	Report		Stadium: Elland Road; Attendance: 36,372; Referee: Stuart Attwell

27 August 2022 4	Brighton & Hove Albion	1–0	Leeds United	Brighton
15:00 BST	Groß 66'	Report		Stadium: Falmer Stadium; Attendance: 30,953; Referee: Michael Salisbury

30 August 2022 5	Leeds United	1–1	Everton	Leeds
20:00 BST	Sinisterra 55'	Report	Gordon 17'	Stadium: Elland Road; Attendance: 36,338; Referee: Darren England

3 September 2022 6	Brentford	5–2	Leeds United	Brentford
15:00 BST	Toney 30' (pen.), 43', 58'; Mbeumo 80'; Wissa 90+1'	Report	Sinisterra 45+1'; Roca 79'	Stadium: Gtech Community Stadium; Attendance: 16,946; Referee: Robert Jones

2 October 2022 7	Leeds United	0–0	Aston Villa	Leeds
16:30 BST		Report		Stadium: Elland Road; Attendance: 36,582; Referee: Stuart Attwell

9 October 2022 8	Crystal Palace	2–1	Leeds United	Selhurst
14:00 BST	Edouard 24'; Eze 76'	Report	Struijk 10'	Stadium: Selhurst Park; Attendance: 25,042; Referee: Paul Tierney

16 October 2022 9	Leeds United	0–1	Arsenal	Leeds
14:00 BST		Report	Saka 35'	Stadium: Elland Road; Attendance: 36,700; Referee: Chris Kavanagh

20 October 2022 10	Leicester City	2–0	Leeds United	Leicester
20:15 BST	Koch 16' (o.g.); Barnes 35'	Report		Stadium: King Power Stadium; Attendance: 30,814; Referee: Peter Bankes

23 October 2022 11	Leeds United	2–3	Fulham	Leeds
14:00 BST	Rodrigo 20'; Summerville 90+1'	Report	Mitrović 26'; Decordova-Reid 74'; Willian 84'	Stadium: Elland Road; Attendance: 36,447; Referee: Anthony Taylor

29 October 2022 12	Liverpool	1–2	Leeds United	Liverpool
19:45 BST	Salah 14'	Report	Rodrigo 4'; Summerville 89'	Stadium: Anfield; Attendance: 53,274; Referee: Michael Oliver

5 November 2022 13	Leeds United	4–3	Bournemouth	Leeds
15:00 GMT	Rodrigo 3' (pen.); Greenwood 60'; Cooper 68'; Summerville 84'	Report	Tavernier 7'; Billing 19'; Solanke 48'	Stadium: Elland Road; Attendance: 36,304; Referee: Tony Harrington

12 November 2022 14	Tottenham Hotspur	4–3	Leeds United	Tottenham
15:00 GMT	Kane 25'; Davies 51'; Bentancur 81', 83'	Report	Summerville 10'; Rodrigo 43', 76'	Stadium: Tottenham Hotspur Stadium; Attendance: 61,667; Referee: Michael Salisbury

28 December 2022 15	Leeds United	1–3	Manchester City	Leeds
20:00 GMT	Struijk 73'	Report	Rodri 45+1'; Haaland 51', 64'	Stadium: Elland Road; Attendance: 36,889; Referee: Stuart Attwell

31 December 2022 16	Newcastle United	0–0	Leeds United	Newcastle
15:00 GMT		Report		Stadium: St James' Park; Attendance: 52,211; Referee: Simon Hooper

4 January 2023 17	Leeds United	2–2	West Ham United	Leeds
19:45 GMT	Rodrigo 70'; Gnonto 27'	Report	Paquetá 45' (pen.); Scamacca 46'	Stadium: Elland Road; Attendance: 36,173; Referee: David Coote

13 January 2023 18	Aston Villa	2–1	Leeds United	Birmingham
20:00 GMT	Bailey 3'; Buendía 64'	Report	Bamford 83'	Stadium: Villa Park; Attendance: 42,008; Referee: Michael Oliver

22 January 2023 19	Leeds United	0–0	Brentford	Leeds
14:00 GMT		Report		Stadium: Elland Road; Attendance: 36,260; Referee: Peter Bankes

5 February 2023 20	Nottingham Forest	1–0	Leeds United	Nottingham
14:00 GMT	Johnson 14'	Report		Stadium: City Ground; Attendance: 29,363; Referee: Robert Jones

8 February 2023 21	Manchester United	2–2	Leeds United	Manchester
20:00 GMT	Rashford 62'; Sancho 70'	Report	Gnonto 1'; Varane 48' (o.g.)	Stadium: Old Trafford; Attendance: 73,456; Referee: Simon Hooper

12 February 2023 22	Leeds United	0–2	Manchester United	Leeds
14:00 GMT		Report	Rashford 80'; Garnacho 85'	Stadium: Elland Road; Attendance: 36,919; Referee: Paul Tierney

18 February 2023 23	Everton	1–0	Leeds United	Liverpool
15:00 GMT	Coleman 64'	Report		Stadium: Goodison Park; Attendance: 39,232; Referee: Andrew Madley

25 February 2023 24	Leeds United	1–0	Southampton	Leeds
15:00 GMT	Firpo 77'	Report		Stadium: Elland Road; Attendance: 36,641; Referee: Peter Bankes

4 March 2023 25	Chelsea	1–0	Leeds United	Fulham
15:00 GMT	W. Fofana 53'	Report		Stadium: Stamford Bridge; Attendance: 39,905; Referee: Michael Oliver

11 March 2023 26	Leeds United	2–2	Brighton & Hove Albion	Leeds
15:00 GMT	Bamford 40'; Harrison 78'	Report	Mac Allister 33'; March 61'	Stadium: Elland Road; Attendance: 36,471; Referee: Paul Tierney

18 March 2023 27	Wolverhampton Wanderers	2–4	Leeds United	Wolverhampton
15:00 GMT	Jonny 65'; Cunha 73'	Report	Harrison 6'; Ayling 49'; Kristensen 62'; Rodrigo 90+7'	Stadium: Molineux Stadium; Attendance: 31,570; Referee: Michael Salisbury

1 April 2023 28	Arsenal	4–1	Leeds United	Holloway
15:00 BST	Gabriel Jesus 35' (pen.), 55'; White 47'; Xhaka 84'	Report	Kristensen 76'	Stadium: Emirates Stadium; Attendance: 60,283; Referee: Darren England

4 April 2023 29	Leeds United	2–1	Nottingham Forest	Leeds
19:45 BST	Harrison 20'; Sinisterra 45+1'	Report	Mangala 12'	Stadium: Elland Road; Attendance: 36,740; Referee: Robert Jones

9 April 2023 30	Leeds United	1–5	Crystal Palace	Leeds
14:00 BST	Bamford 21'	Report	Guéhi 45+1'; Ward (yellow card) 50'; Ayew 53', 77'; Eze 55'; Édouard 69'	Stadium: Elland Road; Attendance: 36,427; Referee: Simon Hooper

17 April 2023 31	Leeds United	1–6	Liverpool	Leeds
20:00 BST	Sinisterra 47'	Report	Gakpo 35'; Salah 39', 64'; Jota 52', 73'; Núñez 90'	Stadium: Elland Road; Attendance: 36,657; Referee: Craig Pawson

22 April 2023 32	Fulham	2–1	Leeds United	Fulham
12:30 BST	Wilson 58'; Pereira 72'	Report	Palhinha 79' (o.g.)	Stadium: Craven Cottage; Attendance: 24,356; Referee: Peter Bankes

25 April 2023 33	Leeds United	1–1	Leicester City	Leeds
20:00 BST	Sinisterra 20'	Report	Vardy 80'	Stadium: Elland Road; Attendance: 36,666; Referee: Paul Tierney

30 April 2023 34	Bournemouth	4–1	Leeds United	Bournemouth
14:00 BST	Lerma 20', 24'; Solanke 63'; Semenyo 90+1'	Report	Bamford 32'	Stadium: Dean Court; Attendance: 10,434; Referee: Chris Kavanagh

6 May 2023 35	Manchester City	2–1	Leeds United	Manchester
15:00 BST	Gündoğan 19', 27'	Report	Rodrigo 85'	Stadium: Etihad Stadium; Attendance: 53,406; Referee: Andrew Madley

13 May 2023 36	Leeds United	2–2	Newcastle United	Leeds
12:30 BST	Ayling 7'; Kristensen 79'	Report	Wilson 31' (pen.), 69' (pen.)	Stadium: Elland Road; Attendance: 36,955; Referee: Simon Hooper

21 May 2023 37	West Ham United	3–1	Leeds United	Stratford
13:30 BST	Rice 32'; Bowen 72'; Lanzini 90+4'	Report	Rodrigo 17'	Stadium: London Stadium; Attendance: 62,478; Referee: Peter Bankes

28 May 2023 38	Leeds United	1–4	Tottenham Hotspur	Leeds
16:30 BST	Harrison 67'	Report	Kane 2', 69'; Porro 47'; Lucas 90+5'	Stadium: Elland Road; Attendance: 36,871; Referee: Anthony Taylor

=== FA Cup ===
8 January 2023 Third round	Cardiff City	2–2	Leeds United	Cardiff
14:00 GMT	Philogene 24'; Ojo 31'	Report	Rodrigo 65'; Perkins 90+3'	Stadium: Cardiff City Stadium; Attendance: 20,324; Referee: Jarred Gillett

17 January 2023 Third round replay	Leeds United	5–2	Cardiff City	Leeds
19:45 GMT	Gnonto 1', 36'; Rodrigo 34'; Bamford 71', 76'	Report	Robinson 84', 90+3' (pen.)	Stadium: Elland Road; Attendance: 34,465; Referee: Thomas Bramall

28 January 2023 Fourth round	Accrington Stanley	1–3	Leeds United	Accrington
12:30 GMT	Adekoya 81'	Report	Harrison 23'; Firpo 66'; Sinisterra 68'	Stadium: Crown Ground; Attendance: 5,268; Referee: Josh Smith

28 February 2023 Fifth round	Fulham	2–0	Leeds United	Fulham
19:45 GMT	Palhinha 21'; Solomon 56'	Report		Stadium: Craven Cottage; Attendance: 19,359; Referee: Chris Kavanagh

=== EFL Cup ===
24 August 2022 Second round	Leeds United	3–1	Barnsley	Leeds
19:45 BST	Sinisterra 21'; Klich 32' (pen.), 56'	Report	Andersen 35'	Stadium: Elland Road; Attendance: 35,472; Referee: John Brooks

9 November 2022 Third round	Wolverhampton Wanderers	1–0	Leeds United	Wolverhampton
19:45 GMT	B. Traoré 85'	Report		Stadium: Molineux Stadium; Attendance: 24,246; Referee: Andre Marriner

== Statistics ==
No.	Pos.	Name	League		FA Cup		EFL Cup		Total		Discipline	
No.	Pos.	Name	Apps	Goals	Apps	Goals	Apps	Goals	Apps	Goals	Yellow card	Red card
1	GK	(France) Illan Meslier	34	0	3	0	1	0	38	0	3	0
2	DF	(England) Luke Ayling	22+7	2	1+1	0	1	0	23+8	2	3	0
3	DF	(Spain) Junior Firpo	14+5	1	4	1	1	0	19+5	2	5	1
4	MF	(England) Adam Forshaw	5+7	0	0	0	1	0	6+7	0	0	0
5	DF	(Germany) Robin Koch	36	0	2	0	0+1	0	38+1	0	7	0
6	DF	(Scotland) Liam Cooper	16+2	1	0	0	1	0	17+2	1	5	0
7	MF	(United States) Brenden Aaronson	28+8	1	1+3	0	0	0	29+11	1	2	0
8	MF	(Spain) Marc Roca	29+3	1	3	0	0+1	0	32+4	1	7	0
9	FW	(England) Patrick Bamford	18+10	4	1+2	2	0	0	19+12	0	3	0
10	FW	(Netherlands) Crysencio Summerville	12+16	4	2	0	1	0	15+16	4	4	0
11	MF	(England) Jack Harrison	34+2	5	2+1	1	1	0	37+3	6	2	0
12	MF	(United States) Tyler Adams	24	0	2	0	0	0	26	0	4	1
14	DF	(Spain) Diego Llorente	7+1	0	2+1	0	2	0	11+2	0	1	0
16	FW	(England) Sonny Perkins	0	0	0+2	1	1	0	1+2	1	0	0
18	MF	(England) Darko Gyabi	0+1	0	1	1	0	2+1	0	0	0	0
19	FW	(Spain) Rodrigo	23+8	13	1+2	2	0+1	0	24+11	15	6	0
20	MF	(Wales) Daniel James	2+2	0	0	0	0+1	0	2+3	0	0	0
21	DF	(Netherlands) Pascal Struijk	26+3	2	1	0	0+1	0	27+4	2	6	0
22	GK	(Spain) Joel Robles	4	0	1	0	1	0	6	0	1	0
23	FW	(Colombia) Luis Sinisterra	13+6	5	1+1	1	1	1	15+7	7	1	1
24	FW	(France) Georginio Rutter	1+10	0	2	0	0	0	3+10	0	0	0
25	DF	(Denmark) Rasmus Kristensen	21+5	3	4	0	0	0	25+5	3	4	0
28	MF	(United States) Weston McKennie	16+3	0	1	0	0	0	17+3	0	7	0
29	FW	(Italy) Wilfried Gnonto	14+10	2	3	2	0+1	0	17+11	4	9	0
30	FW	(England) Joe Gelhardt	1+14	0	1+1	0	2	0	4+15	0	1	0
33	DF	(Norway) Leo Hjelde	0	0	0	0	2	0	2	0	1	0
37	DF	(England) Cody Drameh	1	0	0+1	0	1	0	2+1	0	1	0
39	DF	(Austria) Maximilian Wöber	14+2	0	2+1	0	0	0	16+3	0	4	0
42	MF	(England) Sam Greenwood	3+15	1	3	0	1+1	0	7+16	1	3	0
43	DF	(Poland) Mateusz Klich	0+14	0	0	0	2	2	2+14	2	2	0
49	FW	(England) Mateo Joseph	0+3	0	0+2	0	1	0	1+5	0	0	0

== Transfers ==
=== In ===
Date	Pos.	Name	From	Fee	Ref.
10 June 2022	MF	(United States) Brenden Aaronson	(Austria) Red Bull Salzburg	£25,000,000	
10 June 2022	DF	(Denmark) Rasmus Kristensen	(Austria) Red Bull Salzburg	Undisclosed	
17 June 2022	MF	(Spain) Marc Roca	(Germany) Bayern Munich	£10,000,000	
4 July 2022	MF	(England) Darko Gyabi	(England) Manchester City	Undisclosed	
6 July 2022	MF	(United States) Tyler Adams	(Germany) RB Leipzig	Undisclosed	
7 July 2022	FW	(Colombia) Luis Sinisterra	(Netherlands) Feyenoord	£21,000,000	
19 July 2022	FW	(England) Sonny Perkins	(England) West Ham United	Free	
9 August 2022	GK	(Spain) Joel Robles	(Spain) Real Betis	Free	
2 September 2022	FW	(Italy) Wilfried Gnonto	(Switzerland) FC Zürich	Undisclosed	
3 January 2023	DF	(Austria) Maximilian Wöber	(Austria) Red Bull Salzburg	Undisclosed	
14 January 2023	FW	(France) Georginio Rutter	(Germany) Hoffenheim	£36,000,000	
31 January 2023	DF	(Portugal) Diogo Monteiro	(Switzerland) Servette	Undisclosed	

=== Out ===
Date	Pos.	Name	To	Fee	Ref.
23 June 2022	FW	(England) Ryan Edmondson	(England) Carlisle United	Free	
29 June 2022	DF	(Scotland) Liam McCarron	(England) Stoke City	Undisclosed	
30 June 2022	FW	(England) Lui Bradbury	Unattached	Released	
30 June 2022	DF	(Belgium) Laurens De Bock	Unattached	Released	
30 June 2022	FW	(Scotland) Josh Galloway	Unattached	Released	
30 June 2022	FW	(England) Alfie Hughes	Unattached	Released	
30 June 2022	FW	(Cameroon) Bobby Kamwa	Unattached	Released	
30 June 2022	DF	(Lebanon) Nohan Kenneh	Unattached	Released	
30 June 2022	DF	(England) Joe Littlewood	Unattached	Released	
30 June 2022	FW	(England) Mitch Picksley	Unattached	Released	
4 July 2022	MF	(England) Kalvin Phillips	(England) Manchester City	£45,000,000	
13 July 2022	GK	(Italy) Elia Caprile	(Italy) Bari	Undisclosed	
15 July 2022	FW	(Brazil) Raphinha	(Spain) Barcelona	£55,000,000	
25 July 2022	DF	(England) Leif Davis	(England) Ipswich Town	Undisclosed	
31 July 2022	GK	(Spain) Kiko Casilla	Unattached	Released	
19 August 2022	FW	(Bulgaria) Kun Temenuzhkov	(Spain) Navalcarnero	Released	
4 January 2023	MF	(Poland) Mateusz Klich	(United States) D.C. United	Free	
19 January 2023	FW	(England) Max Dean	(England) Milton Keynes Dons	Undisclosed	
31 March 2023	MF	(Poland) Mateusz Bogusz	(United States) Los Angeles FC	Undisclosed	

=== Loan in ===
Date from	Date to	Pos.	Name	From	Ref.
30 January 2023	30 June 2023	MF	(United States) Weston McKennie	(Italy) Juventus	

=== Loan out ===
Date from	Date to	Pos.	Name	To	Ref.
4 July 2022	30 June 2023	DF	(England) Charlie Cresswell	(England) Millwall	
6 July 2022	30 June 2023	FW	(Wales) Tyler Roberts	(England) Queens Park Rangers	
19 July 2022	30 June 2023	MF	(England) Jamie Shackleton	(England) Millwall	
4 August 2022	30 June 2023	MF	(England) Lewis Bate	(England) Oxford United	
7 August 2022	30 June 2023	FW	(Angola) Hélder Costa	(Saudi Arabia) Al-Ittihad	
17 August 2022	30 June 2023	MF	(Scotland) Stuart McKinstry	(Scotland) Motherwell	
26 Augsust 2022	30 June 2023	MF	(England) Jack Jenkins	(England) Salford City	
27 August 2022	30 June 2023	FW	(England) Ian Poveda	(England) Blackpool	
31 August 2022	23 March 2023	MF	(Poland) Mateusz Bogusz	(Spain) Ibiza	
1 September 2022	30 June 2023	FW	(Wales) Daniel James	(England) Fulham	
9 January 2023	30 June 2023	MF	(Northern Ireland) Alfie McCalmont	(England) Carlisle United	
12 January 2023	30 June 2023	DF	(Norway) Leo Hjelde	(England) Rotherham United	
26 January 2023	30 June 2023	DF	(England) Cody Drameh	(England) Luton Town	
27 January 2023	30 June 2023	FW	(England) Joe Gelhardt	(England) Sunderland	
31 January 2023	30 June 2023	DF	(Spain) Diego Llorente	(Italy) Roma	
