= Diego Llorente =

Spanish footballer

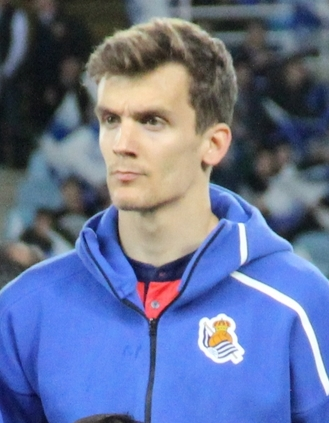
- Llorente with Real Sociedad in 2018

Personal information
- Full name: Diego Javier Llorente Ríos
- Date of birth: 16 August 1993 (age 33)
- Place of birth: Madrid, Spain
- Height: 1.86 m (6 ft 1 in)
- Position: Centre-back

Team information
- Current team: Betis
- Number: 3

Youth career
- 2000–2001: Pérez Galdós
- 2001–2002: Trabenco
- 2002–2012: Real Madrid

Senior career*
Years	Team	Apps	(Gls)
2012–2013	Real Madrid C	29	(1)
2013–2015	Real Madrid B	63	(3)
2013–2017	Real Madrid	2	(0)
2015–2016	→ Rayo Vallecano (loan)	33	(2)
2016–2017	→ Málaga (loan)	25	(2)
2017–2020	Real Sociedad	78	(4)
2020–2024	Leeds United	51	(4)
2023–2024	→ Roma (loan)	38	(1)
2024–	Betis	53	(3)

International career
2013	Spain U20	6	(0)
2016–2022	Spain	10	(0)
Medal record
Men's football
Representing Spain
UEFA European Championship
Bronze medal – third place	2020 Europe
- * Club domestic league appearances and goals as of 18:14, 25 October 2026 (UTC)

Diego Javier Llorente Ríos (Spanish pronunciation: [ˈdjeɣo ʎoˈɾente ˈri.os]; born 16 August 1993) is a Spanish professional footballer who plays as a centre-back for La Liga club Real Betis.

Having been developed at Real Madrid, who also loaned him twice to clubs in La Liga, he signed with Real Sociedad in June 2017. Three years later, he joined Leeds United.

Llorente made his full debut for Spain in 2016. He was part of the squad at Euro 2020.

== Club career ==
=== Real Madrid ===
Born in Madrid, Llorente joined Real Madrid's youth system in July 2002, one month shy of his ninth birthday. In the 2012–13 season he made his senior debut, appearing with the C team in a 1–1 away draw against Caudal Deportivo in the Segunda División B.

On 24 March 2013, Llorente made his first appearance with Real Madrid Castilla, coming on as a substitute for injured Iván González in an eventual 4–0 home win over Córdoba CF. On 11 May, he was an unused bench player for the main squad in a La Liga match at RCD Espanyol, but finally made his debut in the competition on 1 June, replacing Álvaro Arbeloa for the dying minutes of the last game of the campaign, at home against CA Osasuna.

On 14 July 2015, Llorente moved to neighbouring Rayo Vallecano in a season-long loan deal. He scored his first goal in the top flight on 3 January 2016, the first in a 2–2 home draw against Real Sociedad, and was an undisputed starter as his team eventually suffered relegation as third from bottom.

Llorente was loaned to Málaga CF also in the top tier on 8 July 2016.

=== Real Sociedad ===
On 26 June 2017, Llorente signed a five-year contract with Real Sociedad. In his league debut, on 10 September, he contributed one goal to a 4–2 away win against Deportivo de La Coruña after replacing Iñigo Martínez midway through the second half. Four days later, in his first appearance in European competition, he started and scored twice in a 4–0 home defeat of Rosenborg BK in the group stage of the UEFA Europa League.

=== Leeds United ===
Leeds United announced the signing of Llorente on a four-year deal on 24 September 2020, for a reported fee of £18 million. He made his Premier League debut on 5 December, coming on for the injured Robin Koch in the ninth minute of an eventual 3–1 away loss to rivals Chelsea. He scored his first league goal on 19 April 2021, heading home a cross from Jack Harrison in a 1–1 home draw against Liverpool.

=== Loan to Roma ===
On 31 January 2023, Llorente joined Serie A club AS Roma on loan until 30 June with an option to buy. He made his debut in the competition four days later, replacing Nicola Zalewski in injury time of the 2–0 home victory over Empoli FC. Also as a late substitute, he appeared in the Europa League final against Sevilla FC on 31 May, a 4–1 penalty shootout loss in Budapest.

Llorente returned to the Stadio Olimpico for the 2023–24 season, again on loan. He scored his first league goal on 10 March 2024, closing a 2–2 draw at ACF Fiorentina in the 95th minute.

=== Betis ===
On 9 July 2024, Real Betis reached an agreement with Leeds United for the transfer of Llorente, who signed a four-year contract.

== International career ==
Llorente was called up to the Spain national team by manager Vicente del Bosque in May 2016, for a friendly against Bosnia and Herzegovina. He made his debut later that month, replacing Cesc Fàbregas in the 3–1 win in Switzerland.

On 24 May 2021, Llorente was included in Luis Enrique's 24-man squad for UEFA Euro 2020.

== Style of play ==
A right-footed player who possesses good positioning and is strong in the air, Llorente can operate as a central defender or defensive midfielder.

== Career statistics ==
=== Club ===
As of match played 25 October 2026

Appearances and goals by club, season and competition
Club	Season	League			National cup (Note: Includes Copa del Rey, FA Cup, Coppa Italia)		League cup (Note: Includes EFL Cup)		Europe		Other		Total	
Club	Season	Division	Apps	Goals	Apps	Goals	Apps	Goals	Apps	Goals	Apps	Goals	Apps	Goals
Real Madrid C	2012–13	Segunda División B	29	1	–		–		–		–		29	1
Real Madrid B	2012–13	Segunda División	1	0	–		–		–		–		1	0
Real Madrid B	2013–14	Segunda División	31	1	–		–		–		–		31	1
Real Madrid B	2014–15	Segunda División B	31	2	–		–		–		–		31	2
Real Madrid B	Total		63	3	–		–		–		–		63	3
Real Madrid	2012–13	La Liga	1	0	0	0	–		0	0	0	0	1	0
Real Madrid	2013–14	La Liga	1	0	0	0	–		0	0	0	0	1	0
Real Madrid	2014–15	La Liga	0	0	1	0	–		0	0	0	0	1	0
Real Madrid	Total		2	0	1	0	–		0	0	0	0	3	0
Rayo Vallecano (loan)	2015–16	La Liga	33	2	4	0	–		–		–		37	4
Málaga (loan)	2016–17	La Liga	25	2	2	0	–		–		–		27	2
Real Sociedad	2017–18	La Liga	27	3	1	1	–		6 (Note: Appearances in UEFA Europa League)	3	–		34	7
Real Sociedad	2018–19	La Liga	21	0	2	0	–		–		–		23	0
Real Sociedad	2019–20	La Liga	29	1	1	0	–		–		–		30	1
Real Sociedad	2020–21	La Liga	1	0	0	0	–		0	0	–		1	0
Real Sociedad	Total		78	4	4	1	–		6	3	–		88	8
Leeds United	2020–21	Premier League	15	1	0	0	0	0	–		–		15	1
Leeds United	2021–22	Premier League	28	3	1	0	2	0	–		–		31	3
Leeds United	2022–23	Premier League	8	0	3	0	2	0	–		–		13	0
Leeds United	Total		51	4	4	0	4	0	–		–		59	4
Roma (loan)	2022–23	Serie A	9	0	0	0	–		3	0	–		12	0
Roma (loan)	2023–24	Serie A	29	1	1	0	–		11	0	–		41	1
Roma (loan)	Total		38	1	1	0	–		14	0	–		53	1
Betis	2024–25	La Liga	30	2	2	0	—		10 (Note: Appearances in UEFA Conference League)	0	–		42	2
Betis	2025–26	La Liga	18	1	4	1	—		7	0	–		29	2
Betis	2026–27	La Liga	5	0	0	0	—		0	0	0	0	5	0
Betis	Total		53	3	6	1	—		17	0	76	4		
Career total			372	20	22	2	4	0	37	3	435	25		

=== International ===
Appearances and goals by national team and year
National team	Year	Apps	Goals
Spain	2016	1	0
Spain	2018	1	0
Spain	2019	3	0
Spain	2020	1	0
Spain	2021	2	0
Spain	2022	2	0
Total		10	0

== Honours ==
Real Sociedad

- Copa del Rey: 2019–20

Roma

- UEFA Europa League runner-up: 2022–23

Betis

- UEFA Conference League runner-up: 2024–25
