= Robin Koch =

German footballer (born 1996)

Personal information
- Full name: Robin Leon Koch
- Date of birth: 17 July 1996 (age 30)
- Place of birth: Kaiserslautern, Germany
- Height: 1.92 m (6 ft 4 in)
- Positions: Centre-back; defensive midfielder

Team information
- Current team: Eintracht Frankfurt
- Number: 4

Youth career
- 2001–2003: 1. FC Kaiserslautern
- 2003–2009: SV Dörbach
- 2009–2014: Eintracht Trier

Senior career*
Years	Team	Apps	(Gls)
2014–2015	Eintracht Trier II	6	(0)
2014–2015	Eintracht Trier	23	(2)
2015–2016	1. FC Kaiserslautern II	27	(1)
2016–2017	1. FC Kaiserslautern	27	(0)
2017–2020	SC Freiburg	82	(4)
2020–2024	Leeds United	73	(0)
2023–2024	→ Eintracht Frankfurt (loan)	31	(2)
2024–	Eintracht Frankfurt	70	(6)

International career^{‡}
2018–2019	Germany U21	5	(0)
2019–	Germany	15	(0)
Medal record
Representing Germany
UEFA European Under-21 Championship
Runner-up	2019
- * Club domestic league appearances and goals as of 19:30, 1 November 2026 (UTC) ‡ National team caps and goals as of 23:02, 7 September 2025 (UTC)

Robin Leon Koch (German pronunciation: [ˈʁɔbɪn ˈkɔx]; born 17 July 1996) is a German professional footballer who plays as a centre-back or defensive midfielder for Bundesliga club Eintracht Frankfurt, which he captains and the Germany national team.

Koch made his first-team debut for 1. FC Kaiserslautern after graduated from the club's youth system and also played in Bundesliga with SC Freiburg. He has previously played for Eintracht Trier II, Eintracht Trier, 1. FC Kaiserslautern II, 1. FC Kaiserslautern and SC Freiburg. He was included in the Germany U21 team before joining the first-team in November 2019. In August 2020, he signed for Leeds United ahead of their Premier League return and in 2021, represented Germany at UEFA Euro 2020.

== Club career ==
=== Early career ===
Koch was born in Kaiserslautern and joined 1. FC Kaiserslautern's academy at the age of five, but switched to SV Dörbach when his family moved to Salmtal. He joined Eintracht Trier's academy in 2009, and despite the fact that "he was never seen as a superstar talent" according to his childhood best friend, he was invited to regional trials by the German Football Association in 2011. He was promoted to Trier's first team in 2014, and made his debut on 22 September 2014 in a 0–0 draw with TuS Koblenz. He scored his first senior goal on 22 November 2014 in a 4–2 victory over SpVgg Neckarelz; A low shot in the 25th minute to put Eintracht Trier 1–0 up. He appeared in 23 league matches for Eintracht Trier across the 2014–15 season, scoring two goals, whilst he also appeared 6 times for their reserve side.

=== 1. FC Kaiserslautern ===
In 2015, Koch moved to 1. FC Kaiserslautern, initially joining their reserve side. Though he was the son of Kaiserslautern legend Harry Koch, he "tried hard not to live on his father's reputation", living an "unglamorous lifestyle" and "staying off the grid" at Kaiserslautern. He scored once in 26 appearances for Kaiserslautern's reserves in the 2015–16 season. Koch signed his first professional contract with the club in September 2016, with the contract lasting until the summer of 2019. His debut for Kaiserslautern came on 2 October 2016, starting in a 0–0 draw against Arminia Bielefeld in the 2. Bundesliga. He made 24 appearances for Kaiserslautern during the 2016–17 season, and attracted the interest of multiple Bundesliga clubs according to his father Harry.

=== SC Freiburg ===
On 22 August 2017, Koch moved to Bundesliga side SC Freiburg. The transfer fee paid to Kaiserslautern was reported as €3.5 million. He made his Bundesliga debut for Freiburg on 22 October 2017 against Hertha Berlin in a 1–1 draw. He scored his first goal for the club on 13 January 2018 in a 1–1 draw against Eintracht Frankfurt.

=== Leeds United ===
On 29 August 2020, Koch joined newly-promoted Premier League club Leeds United on a four-year deal, for a transfer fee that was reported to be £13 million. He was signed as a replacement for former loanee Ben White, who was deemed to be too expensive to sign permanently. Koch made his Premier League debut for Leeds in the first match of the season against Liverpool on 12 September 2020, starting in the 3–4 defeat at Anfield to the reigning champions. Koch was described as having a 'rough debut', having given away the penalty resulting in Liverpool's first goal despite the fact that the ball deflected off his thigh, before failing to mark Virgil van Dijk for Liverpool's second. Koch was substituted in the ninth minute of a 3–1 defeat to Chelsea on 5 December after a recurrence of a knee injury suffered in the opening game of the season, and subsequently underwent knee surgery. He made his return to the first team as a late substitute against Fulham on 19 March 2021. Following the appointment of Jesse Marsch as manager at Leeds, and a switch to zonal marking, Koch appeared to take a step up in his game and became a regular starter in central defence towards the end of the 2021–22 season and into 2022–23.

=== Eintracht Frankfurt ===
On 6 July 2023, Koch joined Eintracht Frankfurt on loan for the 2023–24 season. Later that year, on 21 September, he scored his first goal in a 2–1 victory over Aberdeen in the Conference League. On 9 January 2024, Koch agreed to join Eintracht Frankfurt on a permanent contract at the end of his loan spell, signing a contract until June 2027. In June 2025, he extended his contract until 2030. He became the club's captain ahead of 2025–26 season, succeeding Kevin Trapp.

== International career ==
=== Youth ===
Having been called up to Germany's under-21 squad in October 2018, Koch was part of the Germany U21's squad who finished runner up at the 2019 UEFA European Under-21 Championship after losing the final to Spain in June 2019.

=== Senior ===
Koch received his first call-up to the German senior squad in October 2019. He debuted the same year on 9 October in a friendly match against Argentina, playing the whole match. His competitive debut occurred on 16 November, starting in the 4–0 UEFA Euro 2020 qualifier victory against Belarus.

Koch was called up to the Germany squad on 26 August 2020 for the UEFA Nations League fixtures against Spain and Switzerland. On 19 May 2021, he was selected to the squad for the UEFA Euro 2020. On 7 June 2024, he was named in Germany's squad for UEFA Euro 2024.

== Style of play ==
Koch plays mainly as a centre-back, but can also play as a defensive midfielder or as a central midfielder. He is described as a ball playing centre-back and his style of play has been compared to that of Javi Martínez.

== Personal life ==
He is the son of former professional footballer Harry Koch. His younger brother Louis plays for SV Alsenborn.

== Career statistics ==
=== Club ===
As of match played 1 November 2026

Appearances and goals by club, season and competition
Club	Season	League			National cup (Note: Includes DFB-Pokal, FA Cup)		League cup (Note: Includes EFL Cup)		Europe		Total	
Club	Season	Division	Apps	Goals	Apps	Goals	Apps	Goals	Apps	Goals	Apps	Goals
Eintracht Trier	2014–15	Regionalliga Südwest	23	2	0	0	—		—		23	2
Eintracht Trier II	2014–15	Rheinlandliga	6	0	—		—		—		6	0
1. FC Kaiserslautern	2015–16	2. Bundesliga	0	0	0	0	—		—		0	0
1. FC Kaiserslautern	2016–17	2. Bundesliga	24	0	0	0	—		—		24	0
1. FC Kaiserslautern	2017–18	2. Bundesliga	3	0	1	0	—		—		4	0
1. FC Kaiserslautern	Total		27	0	1	0	—		—		28	0
1. FC Kaiserslautern II	2015–16	Regionalliga Südwest	24	1	—		—		—		24	1
1. FC Kaiserslautern II	2016–17	Regionalliga Südwest	3	0	—		—		—		3	0
1. FC Kaiserslautern II	Total		27	1	0	0	—		—		27	1
SC Freiburg	2017–18	Bundesliga	26	2	2	0	—		—		28	2
SC Freiburg	2018–19	Bundesliga	24	1	1	0	—		—		25	1
SC Freiburg	2019–20	Bundesliga	32	1	2	1	—		—		34	2
SC Freiburg	Total		82	4	5	1	—		—		87	5
Leeds United	2020–21	Premier League	17	0	0	0	0	0	—		17	0
Leeds United	2021–22	Premier League	20	0	1	0	0	0	—		21	0
Leeds United	2022–23	Premier League	36	0	2	0	1	0	—		39	0
Leeds United	Total		73	0	3	0	1	0	—		77	0
Eintracht Frankfurt (loan)	2023–24 (Note: Part of this season was spent on loan from Leeds United)	Bundesliga	31	2	3	0	—		8 (Note: Appearances in UEFA Europa Conference League)	2	42	4
Eintracht Frankfurt	2024–25	Bundesliga	30	3	3	0	—		10 (Note: Appearances in UEFA Europa League)	0	43	3
Eintracht Frankfurt	2025–26	Bundesliga	32	3	2	0	—		7 (Note: Appearances in UEFA Champions League)	0	41	3
Eintracht Frankfurt	2026–27	Bundesliga	8	0	2	2	—		—		10	2
Eintracht Frankfurt	Frankfurt total		101	7	10	2	—		25	2	136	11
Career total			339	15	19	3	1	0	25	2	386	20

=== International ===
As of match played 7 September 2025

Appearances and goals by national team and year
National team	Year	Apps	Goals
Germany	2019	2	0
Germany	2020	5	0
Germany	2021	1	0
Germany	2024	4	0
Germany	2025	3	0
Total		15	0

== Honours ==
Germany U21

- UEFA European Under-21 Championship runner-up: 2019

individual

- UEFA Europa League Team of the Season: 2024–25
