= 2020–21 Leeds United F.C. season =

101st season in existence of Leeds United

Leeds United
2020–21 season
- Chairman: Andrea Radrizzani
- Head coach: Marcelo Bielsa
- Stadium: Elland Road
- Premier League: 9th
- FA Cup: Third round
- EFL Cup: Second round
- Top goalscorer: League: Patrick Bamford (17); All: Patrick Bamford (17)
- Highest home attendance: 8,000 vs West Bromwich Albion (23 May 2021, Premier League)
- Lowest home attendance: 8,000 vs West Bromwich Albion (23 May 2021, Premier League)
- Average home league attendance: 8,000
Home colours	Away colours	Third colours

The 2020–21 season was Leeds United's 101st season in existence and it is their 51st season in the top division of English Football. It was their first season in the Premier League since the 2003–04 season. In addition to the league, they also competed in the FA Cup and EFL Cup.

== Review ==
=== September ===
Leeds began their Premier League campaign against Liverpool at Anfield on 12 September 2020, live on Sky Sports, losing by a score of 4–3. Mohamed Salah opened the scoring for Liverpool after just four minutes, converting a penalty conceded by Leeds' new signing Robin Koch. Jack Harrison equalised for the visitors eight minutes later through a low right-footed shot, only for Virgil van Dijk to restore Liverpool's lead with a header. Leeds would again equalise in the 33rd minute, with Patrick Bamford scoring after an error from van Dijk, though Salah scored Liverpool's third only minutes later, concluding a 'chaotic' first half. Leeds equalised again after 66 minutes through Mateusz Klich who scored with a ‘perfect first touch and volley,’ though Leeds' new signing Rodrigo conceded a late penalty after a 'shocking challenge' on Fabinho, which Salah converted, completing his hat-trick and consigning Leeds to a 4–3 defeat. The following week, Leeds won 4–3 at home to fellow newly promoted side Fulham. Hélder Costa opened the scoring for Leeds in the fifth minute, scoring off the underside of the crossbar, before Koch conceded a penalty in his second successive match, allowing Aleksandar Mitrović to level the scores after 34 minutes. Leeds regained their advantage after Klich converted a penalty won by Bamford after 41 minutes, before Bamford and Costa scored early in the second half to put Leeds 4–1 up. Bobby Decordova-Reid and Mitrović got goals back for Fulham as Leeds won 4–3. Leeds continued their winning ways with a 1–0 away victory against early strugglers and Yorkshire rivals Sheffield United on 27 September, with Bamford heading in from a Harrison cross after 88 minutes to score the only goal of the game.

=== October ===
After going behind to Manchester City at home on 3 October, Leeds equalised in the second half with a 59th-minute reply from Rodrigo – his first goal for the club – to finish the match 1–1. Following the international break, Leeds suffered their second defeat of the season on 19 October, with a 1–0 defeat to Wolverhampton Wanderers. However, on 23 October, Leeds picked up their third victory of the season with a 3–0 victory over Aston Villa, who had won their first four league games. Bamford scored a second-half hat-trick to secure Leeds' victory; the first goal came from a few yards out into the corner of the net after 55 minutes, whilst the second was a shot into the top corner from 20 yards 12 minutes later. He sealed his hat-trick in the 74th minute with a curling finish following a pass from Costa.

=== November ===
Leeds' opening match of November saw them defeated 4–1 at home by Leicester City, who took the lead after just two minutes when Jamie Vardy intercepted Koch's backpass and set up Harvey Barnes' opener and doubled their lead after 21 minutes through Youri Tielemans. Leeds got a goal back in the 47th minute through a goalbound cross from Stuart Dallas, but late goals from Vardy and Tielemans secured Leicester's win. Leeds again lost 4–1, this time away to Crystal Palace; Palace took the lead after 12 minutes through a Scott Dann header and Bamford had an equaliser controversially ruled out by the video assistant referee as his arm was offside. Shortly after, Palace went 2–0 up through Eberichi Eze, but Bamford did score after 27 minutes, firing into the bottom corner from a Klich assist. Palace restored their two-goal advantage in the 42nd minute: Patrick van Aanholt's cross deflected off Leeds midfielder Costa, before they scored their fourth through Jordan Ayew in the 70th minute. Leeds' following match was a goalless draw at home to Arsenal, in which Leeds hit the woodwork three times after Arsenal's Nicolas Pepe was sent off for headbutting Ezgjan Alioski. Leeds recorded their first victory of November with a 1–0 win away to Everton. After Everton had two goals ruled out for offside during the first half, Raphinha scored his first goal for the club with a low shot from 20 yards in the 75th minute.

=== December ===
Leeds' first match in December saw a return to Stamford Bridge to re-ignite an old rivalry against Chelsea, in front of 2,000 home fans. Leeds started in the best possible way with an early goal from Patrick Bamford when he rounded Édouard Mendy. The lead was short-lived, however, as first Olivier Giroud scored and then Kurt Zouma headed home from a corner. In the dying seconds, Christian Pulisic scored to secure the Chelsea win. Leeds then played West Ham United at Elland Road and went ahead early on from a retaken Mateusz Klich penalty, after West Ham goalkeeper Lukasz Fabianski was deemed to have been off his line. West Ham equalised through a header from Tomáš Souček and scored a winner with another header, this time from Angelo Ogbonna. Leeds were criticised for their poor defending from set pieces. The next match, against Newcastle United saw Leeds end up as 5–2 winners, despite yet again conceding from a set play. On 20 December, Leeds were defeated 6–2 away to rivals Manchester United, going 2–0 down within three minutes following a brace from Scott McTominay and were 4–1 behind at half-time after Bruno Fernandes and Victor Lindelöf extended the home side's lead to 4–0 before Liam Cooper's 42nd-minute header. Leeds were 6–1 behind after Daniel James's 66th-minute strike and Fernandes' second — from the penalty spot — before Dallas scored a consolation in the 73rd minute.

Following criticism aimed at his side, Leeds' Head Coach Marcelo Bielsa defended his style of play and announced he would not change it. The Manchester United result saw Leeds become the first Premier League team of the season to concede 30 goals and it was Bielsa's first game since 1992 where any of the teams he had managed conceded six goals.

Leeds concluded the calendar year on a high note though, with back-to-back wins: a 1–0 victory at home over Burnley in the Boxing Day fixture, played this year on 27 December, in which Bamford netted a penalty and the visitors had a Ben Mee goal disallowed. This was followed by a 5–0 "swashbuckling" win just two days later at The Hawthorns, where Alioski, Harrison, Rodrigo and Raphinha all got on the score sheet, and was one of the results that contributed to the relegation of West Brom that season.

=== January ===
January was a mixed bag for Leeds with two league wins and two league losses for the month. A 3–0 defeat at Tottenham Hotspur, saw Harry Kane scoring the opening goal from the penalty spot before Son Heung-min doubled Spurs' lead shortly before half-time. Toby Alderweireld scored a third before Matt Doherty was sent off in stoppage time. Leeds, with a number of players out injured, including Kalvin Phillips, came away from Brighton on 16 January with a 1–0 loss, Neal Maupay tapping in a 17th-minute winner past keeper Kiko Casilla, making his first Premier League start in the absence of Illan Meslier. In addition, 10 January also saw Leeds’ disastrous F.A. Cup 3–0 third-round loss at League Two side Crawley Town, all three goals coming in a 20-minute spell early in the second half. The team fielded by Bielsa was a full-strength one, although many of the second-half substitutions gave first-team playing appearances to youngsters such as Sam Greenwood, Jack Jenkins and Oliver Casey. The Crawley loss continued Bielsa's winless run in both League and F.A. Cups with Leeds. After the Brighton result — a third consecutive defeat — Bielsa assessed the team's form, in a post-match interview, as follows: “Of course it worries me, these are three games that we could have resolved in a different manner. The game against Tottenham less, but the game in the cup and the one today leave me worried."

However, 2–1 and 3–1 away wins, respectively, against Newcastle (26 January) and Leicester (31 January), in which Patrick Bamford scored his 11th goal of the season and had a hand in the other two from Stuart Dallas and Jack Harrison, brightened the picture and saw Leeds end the month in 12th position, with 29 points – just four points behind then-sixth-placed Spurs.

=== February ===
A congested month of league fixtures saw the Whites take only six points out of a possible 18, with home wins against Crystal Palace and Southampton on the 8th and 23rd of the month, the team continuing to struggle at coping with set pieces, particularly corners. Bamford's goal in the 2–0 Palace win took his career tally to 100 league goals.

Leeds fought back from 4–0 down at The Emirates through goals by Hélder Costa and Pascal Struijk but still came away from London at the wrong end of Pierre-Emerick Aubameyang’s hat trick, and against Wolves on 19 February, a freakish own-goal by Illan Meslier (a post rebound that went in off the back of his head) was all that separated the teams at full-time and earned him the dubious honour of being the Premier League’s youngest goalkeeper (20 years and 354 days) to score an own goal. Another 1–0 defeat, at home against Aston Villa closed out the month, with Leeds still occupying 10th place on 35 points.

=== March ===
Leeds stumbled into March with a 2–0 away loss to a resurgent West Ham on the 8th of the month, in which Kalvin Phillips returned as a starter following a spell out injured, and a nil-all home result five days later against Chelsea, but a 2–1 win against Fulham on 19 March was the first of three wins that straddled the international break, Raphinha getting the 58th-minute winner at Craven Cottage. Several Leeds players were also involved in the final round of international games in late March that saw their countries qualify and the players go on to get capped at Euro 2020 that summer: (Ezgjan Alioski for North Macedonia, Liam Cooper for Scotland, Kalvin Phillips for England, and Mateusz Klich for Poland).

=== April ===
Leeds’ run of wins continued with the defeat at Elland Road of Sheffield United, which saw the hosts come away with all three points in a 2–1 win. On 10 April, in an against-the-odds fixture due to the dismissal of Leeds’ captain Liam Cooper before half-time, 10-man Leeds beat Manchester City 2–1 at the Etihad Stadium, through a brace of goals from midfielder Stuart Dallas. A pair of points from two home draws against Liverpool (1–1) and Manchester United (0–0) marked the only month that season in which Leeds did not lose a game.

=== May ===
A 2–0 loss at Brighton on 1 May was the solitary blight on the final month of Leeds’ return to the Premier League, with the team winning the remaining four games against Spurs, Burnley, Southampton and West Bromwich Albion by a margin of two goals or more, Bamford and Rodrigo claiming seven of the 12 goals scored in those games. Rodrigo's form, particularly, blossomed when he came on as a man-for-man replacement for Bamford, as he did in the Spurs and Burnley games (Bamford replaced Rodrigo in the West Brom game), leaving Bielsa with the prospect of deploying a dual strikeforce for the following season.

Leeds finished the 2020–21 season in ninth position on 59 points, just six points behind Europa League-bound West Ham in sixth place. Other positives that emerged from the end of 2020–21 was that, as well as putting three goals past runners-up Liverpool at Anfield, and holding them to a draw at home, Leeds were the only other team that season, besides Manchester United, to take four points from the eventual champions, Manchester City.

== Transfers ==
=== In ===
Date	Position	Name	From	Fee	Ref.
7 July 2020	FW	Hélder Costa	Wolverhampton Wanderers	Undisclosed	
23 July 2020	GK	Illan Meslier	Lorient	Undisclosed	
10 August 2020	FW	Joe Gelhardt	Wigan Athletic	Undisclosed	
11 August 2020	MF	Charlie Allen	Linfield	Undisclosed	
13 August 2020	DF	Cody Drameh	Fulham	Undisclosed	
18 August 2020	GK	Dani van den Heuvel	Ajax	Free transfer	
28 August 2020	FW	Sam Greenwood	Arsenal	Undisclosed	
29 August 2020	FW	Rodrigo	Valencia	£26,000,000	
29 August 2020	DF	Robin Koch	SC Freiburg	Undisclosed	
16 September 2020	MF	Crysencio Summerville	Feyenoord	Undisclosed	
24 September 2020	DF	Diego Llorente	Real Sociedad	Undisclosed	
5 October 2020	FW	Raphinha	Rennes	Undisclosed	

=== Loans in ===
Date from	Position	Name	From	Date until	Ref.
10 August 2020	MF	Jack Harrison	Manchester City	30 June 2021	

=== Loans out ===
Date from	Position	Name	To	Date until	Ref.
16 July 2020	DF	Laurens De Bock	Zulte Waregem	End of season	
31 July 2020	FW	Ryan Edmondson	Aberdeen	3 January 2021	
5 August 2020	FW	Kun Temenuzhkov	Real Unión	End of season	
26 August 2020	FW	Rafa Mújica	Real Oviedo	1 February 2021	
21 September 2020	FW	Jordan Stevens	Swindon Town	7 January 2021	
25 September 2020	MF	Alfie McCalmont	Oldham Athletic	End of season	
29 September 2020	DF	Bryce Hosannah	Bradford City	End of season	
5 October 2020	MF	Mateusz Bogusz	Logroñés	End of season	
8 October 2020	GK	Matthew Turner	Haverfordwest County	End of season	
15 October 2020	MF	Robbie Gotts	Lincoln City	15 January 2021	
16 October 2020	DF	Barry Douglas	Blackburn Rovers	End of season	
8 January 2021	FW	Jordan Stevens	Bradford City	End of season	
14 January 2021	FW	Ryan Edmondson	Northampton Town	End of season	
15 January 2021	DF	Robbie Gotts	Salford City	End of season	
1 February 2021	FW	Rafa Mújica	UD Las Palmas	End of season	

=== Out ===
Date	Position	Name	To	Fee	Ref.
1 July 2020	DF	Matty Downing	Bradford (Park Avenue)	Free transfer	
1 July 2020	GK	Harrison Male	Free agent	Released	
31 July 2020	DF	Joe Stanley	Buxton	Free transfer	
4 September 2020	DF	Joshveer Shergill	Solihull Moors	Free transfer	
5 September 2020	GK	Will Huffer	Bradford (Park Avenue)	Released	
5 September 2020	GK	Kamil Miazek	Free agent	Released	
9 October 2020	MF	Theo Hudson	Darlington	Free transfer	
1 February 2021	FW	Jay-Roy Grot	Osnabrück	Undisclosed	
1 February 2021	MF	Conor Shaughnessy	Rochdale	Free transfer	

== Pre-season ==
Win	Draw	Loss

Date	Opponent	Venue	Result F–A	Scorers	Attendance	Ref.
1 September 2020	Stoke City	Away	0–3	—	0 (Note: Match played behind closed doors due to COVID-19 restrictions.)	
5 September 2020	Paços de Ferreira	Home	3–1	Struijk 39', Hernández 54', Costa 77'	0	

== Players ==
No.	Name	Nationality	Position	Date of birth (age)	Signed from	Signed in	Contract ends
Goalkeepers
1	Illan Meslier	(France)	GK	2 March 2000 (aged 20)	Lorient	2020	2023
13	Kiko Casilla	(Spain)	GK	2 October 1986 (aged 33)	Real Madrid	2019	2023
25	Elia Caprile	(Italy)	GK	25 August 2001 (aged 19)	Chievo Verona	2020	2024
Defenders
2	Luke Ayling	(England)	RB / CB	25 August 1991 (aged 29)	Bristol City	2016	2023
28	Gaetano Berardi	(Switzerland)	RB / LB / CB	21 August 1988 (aged 32)	Sampdoria	2014	2021
6	Liam Cooper	(Scotland)	CB	30 August 1991 (aged 29)	Chesterfield	2014	2024
5	Robin Koch	(Germany)	CB / DM	17 July 1996 (aged 24)	SC Freiburg	2020	2024
14	Diego Llorente	(Spain)	CB	16 August 1993 (aged 27)	Real Sociedad	2020	2024
21	Pascal Struijk	(Netherlands)	CB / DM	11 August 1999 (aged 21)	Ajax	2018	2024
29	Oliver Casey	(England)	CB	14 October 2000 (aged 19)	Academy	2018	2023
35	Charlie Cresswell	(England)	CB	7 December 2002 (aged 17)	Academy	2018	2022
15	Stuart Dallas	(Northern Ireland)	LB / LM / CM	19 April 1991 (aged 29)	Brentford	2015	2023
10	Ezgjan Alioski	(North Macedonia)	LB / LW	12 February 1992 (aged 28)	FC Lugano	2017	2021
24	Leif Davis	(England)	LB	12 January 2000 (aged 20)	Morecambe	2018	2023
52	Niall Huggins	(Wales)	LB / LW	18 December 2000 (aged 19)	Academy	2013	2023
Midfielders
23	Kalvin Phillips	(England)	DM / CB	2 December 1995 (aged 24)	Academy	2010	2024
43	Mateusz Klich	(Poland)	CM	13 June 1990 (aged 30)	FC Twente	2017	2024
4	Adam Forshaw	(England)	CM	8 October 1991 (aged 28)	Middlesbrough	2018	2022
46	Jamie Shackleton	(England)	CM / RB	8 October 1999 (aged 20)	Academy	2006	2024
47	Jack Jenkins	(England)	CM	23 March 2002 (aged 18)	Academy	2019	2023
19	Pablo Hernandez	(Spain)	AM / LW / RW	11 April 1985 (aged 35)	Al-Arabi	2017	2022
20	Rodrigo	(Spain)	AM / ST	6 March 1991 (aged 29)	Valencia	2020	2024
11	Tyler Roberts	(Wales)	AM / ST	12 January 1999 (aged 21)	West Brom	2018	2022
22	Jack Harrison	(England)	LW / RW	20 November 1996 (aged 23)	Man City (Loan)	2018	2021
17	Hélder Costa	(Angola)	RW / ST / LW	12 January 1994 (aged 26)	Wolves	2019	2024
7	Ian Poveda	(England)	RW / LW	9 February 2000 (aged 20)	Man City	2020	2024
18	Raphinha	(Brazil)	RW	14 December 1996 (aged 23)	Rennes	2020	2024
Attackers
9	Patrick Bamford	(England)	ST	5 September 1993 (aged 27)	Middlesbrough	2018	2022
30	Joe Gelhardt	(England)	ST	4 May 2002 (aged 18)	Wigan Athletic	2020	2024
42	Sam Greenwood	(England)	ST	26 January 2002 (aged 18)	Arsenal	2020	2023

== Competitions ==
=== Premier League ===
==== League table ====
Pos	Team	Pld	W	D	L	GF	GA	GD	Pts	Qualification or relegation
7	Tottenham Hotspur	38	18	8	12	68	45	+23	62	Qualification for the Europa Conference League play-off round (Note: Since the winners of the 2020–21 EFL Cup, Manchester City, qualified for European competition based on league position, the Europa Conference League berth awarded to the EFL Cup winners was transferred to the highest-placed Premier League team not already qualified for European competition, the seventh-placed team.)
8	Arsenal	38	18	7	13	55	39	+16	61	
9	Leeds United	38	18	5	15	62	54	+8	59	
10	Everton	38	17	8	13	47	48	−1	59	
11	Aston Villa	38	16	7	15	55	46	+9	55	

Source: Premier League
Rules for classification: 1) Points; 2) Goal difference; 3) Goals scored; 4) If the champions, relegated teams or qualified teams for UEFA competitions cannot be determined by rules 1 to 3, rules 4.1 to 4.3 are applied – 4.1) Points gained in head-to-head record between such teams; 4.2) Away goals scored in head-to-head record between such teams; 4.3) Play-offs

==== Results summary ====
Overall								Home						Away					
Pld	W	D	L	GF	GA	GD	Pts	W	D	L	GF	GA	GD	W	D	L	GF	GA	GD
38	18	5	15	62	54	+8	59	8	5	6	28	21	+7	10	0	9	34	33	+1

Last updated: 23 May 2021.
Source: Premier League

==== Results by round ====
Matchday	1	2	3	4	5	6	7	8	9	10	11	12	13	14	15	16	17	18	19	20	21	22	23	24	25	26	27	28	29	30	31	32	33	34	35	36	37	38
Ground	A	H	A	H	H	A	H	A	H	A	A	H	H	A	H	A	A	H	A	A	H	H	A	A	H	H	A	H	A	H	A	H	H	A	H	A	A	H
Result	L	W	W	D	L	W	L	L	D	W	L	L	W	L	W	W	L	L	W	W	L	W	L	L	W	L	L	D	W	W	W	D	D	L	W	W	W	W
Position	9	10	7	8	10	6	12	15	14	12	14	14	13	14	12	11	12	12	12	12	11	10	11	12	10	11	11	12	11	11	10	10	9	11	10	10	10	9

Updated to match(es) played on 23 May 2021. Source:
A = Away; H = Home; W = Win; D = Draw; L = Loss

==== Matches ====
On 20 August, the Premier League fixtures were released.

Win	Draw	Loss

Date	Opponent	Venue	Result F–A	Scorers	Attendance	Referee	Ref.
12 September 2020	Liverpool	Away	3–4	Harrison 12', Bamford 30', Klich 66'	0	Oliver	
19 September 2020	Fulham	Home	4–3	Costa 5', 57', Klich 41 (pen.), Bamford 50'	0	Taylor	
27 September 2020	Sheffield United	Away	1–0	Bamford 88'	0	Tierney	
3 October 2020	Manchester City	Home	1–1	Rodrigo 59'	0	Dean	
19 October 2020	Wolverhampton Wanderers	Home	0–1		0	Coote	
23 October 2020	Aston Villa	Away	3–0	Bamford 55', 67', 74'	0	Tierney	
2 November 2020	Leicester City	Home	1–4	Dallas 48'	0	Marriner	
7 November 2020	Crystal Palace	Away	1–4	Bamford 27'	0	Kavanagh	
22 November 2020	Arsenal	Home	0–0		0	Taylor	
28 November 2020	Everton	Away	1–0	Raphinha 79'	0	Kavanagh	
5 December 2020	Chelsea	Away	1–3	Bamford 4'	2,000	Friend	
11 December 2020	West Ham United	Home	1–2	Klich 6' (pen.)	0	Oliver	
16 December 2020	Newcastle United	Home	5–2	Bamford 35', Rodrigo 61', Dallas 77', Alioski 85', Harrison 88'	0	Hooper	
20 December 2020	Manchester United	Away	2–6	Cooper 42', Dallas 73'	0	Taylor	
27 December 2020	Burnley	Home	1–0	Bamford 5' (pen.)	0	Jones	
29 December 2020	West Bromwich Albion	Away	5–0	Sawyers 9' (o.g.), Alioski 31', Harrison 36', Rodrigo 40', Raphinha 72'	0	Mason	
2 January 2021	Tottenham Hotspur	Away	0–3		0	Coote	
16 January 2021	Brighton & Hove Albion	Home	0–1		0	Friend	
26 January 2021	Newcastle United	Away	2–1	Raphinha 17', Harrison 61'	0	Taylor	
31 January 2021	Leicester City	Away	3–1	Dallas 15', Bamford 70', Harrison 84'	0	Kavanagh	
3 February 2021	Everton	Home	1–2	Raphinha 48'	0	Oliver	
8 February 2021	Crystal Palace	Home	2–0	Harrison 3', Bamford 52'	0	Marriner	
14 February 2021	Arsenal	Away	2–4	Struijk 58', Costa 69'	0	Attwell	
19 February 2021	Wolverhampton Wanderers	Away	0–1		0	Coote	
23 February 2021	Southampton	Home	3–0	Bamford 47', Dallas 78', Raphinha 84'	0	Marriner	
27 February 2021	Aston Villa	Home	0–1		0	Bankes	
8 March 2021	West Ham United	Away	0–2		0	Dean	
13 March 2021	Chelsea	Home	0–0		0	Friend	
19 March 2021	Fulham	Away	2–1	Bamford 29', Raphinha 58'	0	Coote	
3 April 2021	Sheffield United	Home	2–1	Harrison 12', Jagielka 49' (o.g.)	0	Scott	
10 April 2021	Manchester City	Away	2–1	Dallas 42', 90+1'	0	Marriner	
19 April 2021	Liverpool	Home	1–1	Llorente 87'	0	Taylor	
25 April 2021	Manchester United	Home	0–0		0	Pawson	
1 May 2021	Brighton & Hove Albion	Away	0–2		0	Kavanagh	
8 May 2021	Tottenham Hotspur	Home	3–1	Dallas 13', Bamford 42', Rodrigo 84'	0	Oliver	
15 May 2021	Burnley	Away	4–0	Klich 44', Harrison 60', Rodrigo 77', 79'	0	Scott	
18 May 2021	Southampton	Away	2–0	Bamford 73', Roberts 90+5'	8,000	Bankes	
23 May 2021	West Bromwich Albion	Home	3–1	Rodrigo 17', Phillips 42', Bamford 79' (pen.)	8,000	Coote	

=== FA Cup ===
On 30 November, the third round draw was made with Premier League and Championship clubs all entering the competition.

Win	Draw	Loss

Round	Date	Opponent	Venue	Result F–A	Scorers	Attendance	Referee	Ref.
Third round	10 January 2021	Crawley Town	Away	0–3		0	Bankes	

=== EFL Cup ===
On 6 September, the draw for both the second and third round were confirmed.

Win	Draw	Loss

Round	Date	Opponent	Venue	Result F–A	Scorers	Attendance	Referee	Ref.
Second round	16 September 2020	Hull City	Home	1–1 (8–9 p)	Alioski 90+3'	0	Webb	

== Player statistics ==
=== Appearances and goals ===
Players with no appearances not included in the list. The plus (+) symbol denotes an appearance as a substitute, hence 2+1 indicates two appearances in the starting XI and one appearance as a substitute.

No.	Pos	Nat	Player	Total		Premier League		FA Cup		EFL Cup	
No.	Pos	Nat	Player	Apps	Goals	Apps	Goals	Apps	Goals	Apps	Goals
Goalkeepers
1	GK	(France) FRA	Illan Meslier	35	0	35	0	0	0	0	0
13	GK	(Spain) ESP	Kiko Casilla	5	0	3	0	1	0	1	0
Defenders
2	DF	(England) ENG	Luke Ayling	38	0	38	0	0	0	0	0
3	DF	(Scotland) SCO	Barry Douglas	1	0	0	0	0	0	1	0
5	DF	(Germany) GER	Robin Koch	17	0	13+4	0	0	0	0	0
6	DF	(Scotland) SCO	Liam Cooper	27	1	26	1	1	0	0	0
14	DF	(Spain) ESP	Diego Llorente	15	1	14+1	1	0	0	0	0
21	DF	(Netherlands) NED	Pascal Struijk	29	1	22+5	1	1	0	0+1	0
24	DF	(England) ENG	Leif Davis	4	0	0+2	0	1	0	1	0
28	DF	(Switzerland) SUI	Gaetano Berardi	2	0	1+1	0	0	0	0	0
35	DF	(England) ENG	Charlie Cresswell	1	0	0	0	0	0	1	0
49	DF	(England) ENG	Oliver Casey	2	0	0	0	0+1	0	1	0
52	DF	(Wales) WAL	Niall Huggins	2	0	0+1	0	0	0	1	0
Midfielders
7	MF	(England) ENG	Ian Poveda	16	0	0+14	0	1	0	1	0
10	MF	(North Macedonia) MKD	Ezgjan Alioski	38	3	29+7	2	1	0	1	1
15	MF	(Northern Ireland) NIR	Stuart Dallas	38	8	38	8	0	0	0	0
17	MF	(Angola) ANG	Hélder Costa	23	3	13+9	3	1	0	0	0
18	MF	(Brazil) BRA	Raphinha	31	6	26+4	6	0+1	0	0	0
19	MF	(Spain) ESP	Pablo Hernández	17	0	3+13	0	1	0	0	0
22	MF	(England) ENG	Jack Harrison	37	8	34+2	8	0+1	0	0	0
23	MF	(England) ENG	Kalvin Phillips	30	1	28+1	1	1	0	0	0
36	MF	(England) ENG	Robbie Gotts	1	0	0	0	0	0	0+1	0
43	MF	(Poland) POL	Mateusz Klich	35	4	28+7	4	0	0	0	0
44	MF	(Poland) POL	Mateusz Bogusz	1	0	0	0	0	0	1	0
46	MF	(England) ENG	Jamie Shackleton	15	0	3+10	0	1	0	1	0
47	MF	(England) ENG	Jack Jenkins	1	0	0	0	0+1	0	0	0
Forwards
9	FW	(England) ENG	Patrick Bamford	38	17	37+1	17	0	0	0	0
11	FW	(Wales) WAL	Tyler Roberts	28	1	14+13	1	0	0	1	0
20	FW	(Spain) ESP	Rodrigo	27	7	13+12	7	1	0	1	0
42	FW	(England) ENG	Sam Greenwood	1	0	0	0	0+1	0	0	0

Last updated: 18 May 2021
