= 2025–26 Leeds United F.C. season =

Leeds United
2025–26 season
- Chairman: Paraag Marathe
- Manager: Daniel Farke
- Stadium: Elland Road
- Premier League: 14th
- FA Cup: Semi-finals
- EFL Cup: Second round
- Top goalscorer: League: Dominic Calvert-Lewin (14); All: Dominic Calvert-Lewin (15)
- Highest home attendance: 36,909 vs Manchester United (4 January 2026, Premier League)
- Lowest home attendance: 36,334 vs Crystal Palace (20 December 2025, Premier League)
- Average home league attendance: 36,695
Home colours	Away colours	Third colours

The 2025–26 season saw Leeds United competing in the Premier League following promotion the previous season.

== Pre-season and friendlies ==
Leeds United announced pre-season friendlies against Manchester United, Villarreal and AC Milan.

Win Draw Loss Fixtures

19 July 2025 Friendly	Manchester United	0–0	Leeds United	Stockholm
15:00 CEST		Report		Stadium: Strawberry Arena; Attendance: 45,345; Referee: Adam Ladebäck

22 July 2025 Friendly	SC Verl	1–4	Leeds United	Verl
15:30 CEST	Arweiler 119'	Report	Piroe 25', 40' (pen.); Gnonto 76'; Nmecha 91'	Stadium: Sportclub Arena; Attendance: 0 Referee: Henry Schröder

26 July 2025 Friendly	SC Paderborn	2–3	Leeds United	Paderborn
15:00 CEST	Grimaldi 74'; Baur 89'	Report	Piroe 30'; Gnonto 55'; Nmecha 79'	Stadium: Home Deluxe Arena; Attendance: 0 Referee: Henry Schröder

2 August 2025 Friendly	Leeds United	1–1	Villarreal	Leeds
15:00 BST	Piroe 67'	Report	Etta Eyong 62'	Stadium: Elland Road; Attendance: 35,273; Referee: Sam Barrott

9 August 2025 Friendly	Leeds United	1–1	Milan	Dublin
15:00 BST	Stach 67'	Report	Giménez 31'	Stadium: Aviva Stadium; Attendance: 51,711; Referee: Paul McLaughlin

== Competitions ==
=== Overall record ===
Competition	First match	Last match	Starting round	Final position	Record							
Competition	First match	Last match	Starting round	Final position	Pld	W	D	L	GF	GA	GD	Win %
Premier League	18 August 2025	24 May 2026	Matchday 1	14th	38	11	14	13	49	56	−7	28.95
FA Cup	11 January 2026	26 April 2026	Third round	Semi-finals	5	2	2	1	9	5	+4	40.00
EFL Cup	26 August 2025		Second round	Second round	1	0	1	0	1	1	+0	0.00
Total					44	13	17	14	59	62	−3	29.55

Source: Soccerway

=== Premier League ===
==== League table ====
Pos	Team	Pld	W	D	L	GF	GA	GD	Pts	Qualification or relegation
12	Newcastle United	38	14	7	17	53	55	−2	49	
13	Everton	38	13	10	15	47	50	−3	49	
14	Leeds United	38	11	14	13	49	56	−7	47	
15	Crystal Palace	38	11	12	15	41	51	−10	45	Qualification for the Europa League league phase (Note: Crystal Palace qualified for the Europa League league phase as the 2025–26 UEFA Conference League winners.)
16	Nottingham Forest	38	11	11	16	48	51	−3	44	

Source: Premier League
Rules for classification: 1) Points; 2) Goal difference; 3) Goals scored; 4) If the champions, relegated teams or qualified teams for UEFA competitions cannot be determined by rules 1 to 3, rules 4.1 to 4.3 are applied – 4.1) Points gained in head-to-head record between such teams; 4.2) Away goals scored in head-to-head record between such teams; 4.3) Play-offs

==== Results summary ====
Overall								Home						Away					
Pld	W	D	L	GF	GA	GD	Pts	W	D	L	GF	GA	GD	W	D	L	GF	GA	GD
38	11	14	13	49	56	−7	47	9	5	5	29	21	+8	2	9	8	20	35	−15

Source: Soccerway

==== Results by round ====
Round	1	2	3	4	5	6	7	8	9	10	11	12	13	14	15	16	17	18	19	20	21	22	23	24	25	26	27	28	29	30	31	32	33	34	35	36	37	38
Ground	H	A	H	A	A	H	H	A	H	A	A	H	A	H	H	A	H	A	A	H	A	H	A	H	H	A	A	H	H	A	H	A	H	A	H	A	H	A
Result	W	L	D	L	W	D	L	L	W	L	L	L	L	W	D	D	W	D	D	D	L	W	D	L	W	D	D	L	L	D	D	W	W	D	W	D	W	L
Position	7	12	12	16	12	12	15	16	15	16	16	18	18	17	16	17	16	16	16	16	16	16	16	16	16	15	15	15	15	15	15	15	15	15	14	14	14	14

Source: Soccerway
A = Away; H = Home; W = Win; D = Draw; L = Loss; P = Postponed

==== Matches ====
18 August 2025 1	Leeds United	1–0	Everton	Leeds
20:00 BST	Nmecha 84' (pen.)	Report		Stadium: Elland Road; Attendance: 36,820; Referee: Chris Kavanagh

23 August 2025 2	Arsenal	5–0	Leeds United	Holloway
17:30 BST	Timber 34', 56'; Saka 45+1'; Gyökeres 48', 90+5' (pen.)	Report		Stadium: Emirates Stadium; Attendance: 60,110; Referee: Jarred Gillett

30 August 2025 3	Leeds United	0–0	Newcastle United	Leeds
17:30 BST		Report		Stadium: Elland Road; Attendance: 36,727; Referee: Peter Bankes

13 September 2025 4	Fulham	1–0	Leeds United	Fulham
15:00 BST	Gudmundsson 90+4' (o.g.)	Report		Stadium: Craven Cottage; Attendance: 27,327; Referee: Craig Pawson

20 September 2025 5	Wolverhampton Wanderers	1–3	Leeds United	Wolverhampton
15:00 BST	Krejčí 8'	Report	Calvert-Lewin 31'; Stach 39'; Okafor 45'	Stadium: Molineux Stadium; Attendance: 30,807; Referee: Anthony Taylor

27 September 2025 6	Leeds United	2–2	Bournemouth	Leeds
15:00 BST	Rodon 37'; Longstaff 54'	Report	Semenyo 26'; Kroupi 90+3'	Stadium: Elland Road; Attendance: 36,574; Referee: Michael Oliver

4 October 2025 7	Leeds United	1–2	Tottenham Hotspur	Leeds
12:30 BST	Okafor 34'	Report	Tel 23'; Kudus 57'	Stadium: Elland Road; Attendance: 36,703; Referee: Thomas Bramall

18 October 2025 8	Burnley	2–0	Leeds United	Burnley
15:00 BST	Ugochukwu 18'; Tchaouna 68'	Report		Stadium: Turf Moor; Attendance: 21,646; Referee: Tim Robinson

24 October 2025 9	Leeds United	2–1	West Ham United	Leeds
20:00 BST	Aaronson 3'; Rodon 15'	Report	Fernandes 90'	Stadium: Elland Road; Attendance: 36,788; Referee: Stuart Attwell

1 November 2025 10	Brighton & Hove Albion	3–0	Leeds United	Brighton
15:00 GMT	Welbeck 11'; Gómez 64', 70'	Report		Stadium: Falmer Stadium; Attendance: 31,512; Referee: Michael Oliver

9 November 2025 11	Nottingham Forest	3–1	Leeds United	Nottingham
14:00 GMT	Sangaré 15'; Gibbs-White 68'; Anderson 90+1' (pen.)	Report	Nmecha 13'	Stadium: City Ground; Attendance: 30,708; Referee: Jarred Gillett

23 November 2025 12	Leeds United	1–2	Aston Villa	Leeds
14:00 GMT	Nmecha 8'	Report	Rogers 48', 75'	Stadium: Elland Road; Attendance: 36,819; Referee: Robert Jones

29 November 2025 13	Manchester City	3–2	Leeds United	Manchester
15:00 GMT	Foden 1', 90+1'; Gvardiol 25'	Report	Calvert-Lewin 49'; Nmecha 68'	Stadium: Etihad Stadium; Attendance: 55,097; Referee: Peter Bankes

3 December 2025 14	Leeds United	3–1	Chelsea	Leeds
20:15 GMT	Bijol 6'; Tanaka 43'; Calvert-Lewin 72'	Report	Neto 50'	Stadium: Elland Road; Attendance: 36,767; Referee: Darren England

6 December 2025 15	Leeds United	3–3	Liverpool	Leeds
17:30 GMT	Calvert-Lewin 73' (pen.); Stach 75'; Tanaka 90+6'	Report	Ekitike 48', 50'; Szoboszlai 80'	Stadium: Elland Road; Attendance: 36,842; Referee: Anthony Taylor

14 December 2025 16	Brentford	1–1	Leeds United	Brentford
16:30 GMT	Henderson 70'	Report	Calvert-Lewin 82'	Stadium: Brentford Community Stadium; Attendance: 17,159; Referee: John Brooks

20 December 2025 17	Leeds United	4–1	Crystal Palace	Leeds
20:00 GMT	Calvert-Lewin 38', 45+4'; Ampadu 60'; Stach 90+11'	Report	Devenny 90+2' (pen.)	Stadium: Elland Road; Attendance: 36,334; Referee: Thomas Bramall

28 December 2025 18	Sunderland	1–1	Leeds United	Sunderland
14:00 GMT	Adingra 28'	Report	Calvert-Lewin 47'	Stadium: Stadium of Light; Attendance: 46,675; Referee: Tony Harrington

1 January 2026 19	Liverpool	0–0	Leeds United	Liverpool
17:30 GMT		Report		Stadium: Anfield; Attendance: 60,343; Referee: Chris Kavanagh

4 January 2026 20	Leeds United	1–1	Manchester United	Leeds
12:30 GMT	Aaronson 62'	Report	Cunha 65'	Stadium: Elland Road; Attendance: 36,909; Referee: Jarred Gillett

7 January 2026 21	Newcastle United	4–3	Leeds United	Newcastle
20:15 GMT	Barnes 36', 90+12'; Joelinton 54'; Bruno Guimarães 90+1' (pen.)	Report	Aaronson 32', 79'; Calvert-Lewin 45+5' (pen.)	Stadium: St James' Park; Attendance: 52,176; Referee: Michael Salisbury

17 January 2026 22	Leeds United	1–0	Fulham	Leeds
15:00 GMT	Nmecha 90+1'	Report		Stadium: Elland Road; Attendance: 36,300; Referee: Chris Kavanagh

26 January 2026 23	Everton	1–1	Leeds United	Liverpool
20:00 GMT	Barry 76'	Report	Justin 28'	Stadium: Hill Dickinson Stadium; Attendance: 51,979; Referee: Simon Hooper

31 January 2026 24	Leeds United	0–4	Arsenal	Leeds
15:00 GMT		Report	Zubimendi 27'; Madueke 38'; Gyökeres 69'; Gabriel Jesus 86'	Stadium: Elland Road; Attendance: 36,858; Referee: Stuart Attwell

6 February 2026 25	Leeds United	3–1	Nottingham Forest	Leeds
20:00 GMT	Bogle 26'; Okafor 30'; Calvert-Lewin 49'	Report	Lucca 86'	Stadium: Elland Road; Attendance: 36,835; Referee: Peter Bankes

10 February 2026 26	Chelsea	2–2	Leeds United	Fulham
19:30 GMT	João Pedro 24'; Palmer 58' (pen.)	Report	Nmecha 67' (pen.); Okafor 73'	Stadium: Stamford Bridge; Attendance: 39,253; Referee: Robert Jones

21 February 2026 27	Aston Villa	1–1	Leeds United	Birmingham
15:00 GMT	Abraham 88'	Report	Stach 31'	Stadium: Villa Park; Attendance: 43,048; Referee: Michael Oliver

28 February 2026 28	Leeds United	0–1	Manchester City	Leeds
17:30 GMT		Report	Semenyo 45+2'	Stadium: Elland Road; Attendance: 36,838; Referee: Peter Bankes
Note: Fixture was initially scheduled for a 15:00 kick-off, but was rescheduled for live Sky Sports broadcasting.

3 March 2026 29	Leeds United	0–1	Sunderland	Leeds
19:30 GMT		Report	Diarra 70' (pen.)	Stadium: Elland Road; Attendance: 36,713; Referee: Stuart Attwell

15 March 2026 30	Crystal Palace	0–0	Leeds United	Selhurst
14:00 GMT		Report		Stadium: Selhurst Park; Attendance: 25,155; Referee: Thomas Bramall

21 March 2026 31	Leeds United	0–0	Brentford	Leeds
20:00 GMT		Report		Stadium: Elland Road; Attendance: 36,386; Referee: Jarred Gillett

13 April 2026 32	Manchester United	1–2	Leeds United	Manchester
20:00 BST	Casemiro 69'	Report	Okafor 5', 29'	Stadium: Old Trafford; Attendance: 74,018; Referee: Paul Tierney

18 April 2026 33	Leeds United	3–0	Wolverhampton Wanderers	Leeds
15:00 BST	Justin 18'; Okafor 20'; Calvert-Lewin 90+5' (pen.)	Report		Stadium: Elland Road; Attendance: 36,840; Referee: Farai Hallam

22 April 2026 34	Bournemouth	2–2	Leeds United	Bournemouth
20:00 BST	Kroupi 60'; Rayan 85'	Report	Hill 68' (o.g.); Longstaff 90+7'	Stadium: Dean Court; Attendance: 11,226; Referee: Michael Salisbury
Note: Fixture was initially scheduled for 25 April, but was moved due to Leeds United's involvement in the FA Cup semi-finals. The game was also selected for live Sky Sports broadcast.

1 May 2026 35	Leeds United	3–1	Burnley	Leeds
20:00 BST	Stach 8'; Okafor 52'; Calvert-Lewin 56'	Report	Tchaouna 71'	Stadium: Elland Road; Attendance: 36,265; Referee: Thomas Bramall
Note: Fixture was initially scheduled for 2 May, but was brought forward a day for live Sky Sports broadcasting.

11 May 2026 36	Tottenham Hotspur	1–1	Leeds United	Tottenham
20:00 BST	Tel 50'	Report	Calvert-Lewin 74' (pen.)	Stadium: Tottenham Hotspur Stadium; Attendance: 61,048; Referee: Jarred Gillett
Note: Fixture was initially scheduled for 9 May, but was pushed back for live Sky Sports broadcasting.

17 May 2026 37	Leeds United	1–0	Brighton & Hove Albion	Leeds
15:00 BST	Calvert-Lewin 90+6'	Report		Stadium: Elland Road; Attendance: 36,880; Referee: Michael Oliver

24 May 2026 38	West Ham United	3–0	Leeds United	Stratford
16:00 BST	Castellanos 67'; Bowen 79'; Wilson 90+4'	Report		Stadium: London Stadium; Attendance: 62,471; Referee: Anthony Taylor

=== FA Cup ===
11 January 2026 Third round	Derby County	1–3	Leeds United	Derby
12:00 GMT	Brereton 35'	Report	Gnonto 55'; Tanaka 59'; Justin 90+3'	Stadium: Pride Park Stadium; Attendance: 21,741; Referee: Anthony Taylor

15 February 2026 Fourth round	Birmingham City	1–1 (a.e.t.) (2–4 p)	Leeds United	Birmingham
12:00 GMT	Roberts 89'	Report	Nmecha 49'	Stadium: St Andrew's; Attendance: 28,035; Referee: Paul Tierney
	Penalties
	Stansfield (penalty scored); Ducksch (penalty scored); Doyle (penalty missed); Roberts (penalty missed)		(penalty scored) Piroe; (penalty scored) Calvert-Lewin; (penalty scored) Aaronson; (penalty scored) Longstaff

8 March 2026 Fifth round	Leeds United	3–0	Norwich City	Leeds
16:30 GMT	Longstaff 32'; Gudmundsson 43'; Piroe 85'	Report		Stadium: Elland Road; Attendance: 36,313; Referee: Darren England

5 April 2026 Quarter-finals	West Ham United	2–2 (a.e.t.) (2–4 p)	Leeds United	Stratford
16:30 BST	Fernandes 90+3'; Disasi 90+6'	Report	Tanaka 26'; Calvert-Lewin 75' (pen.)	Stadium: London Stadium; Attendance: 62,260; Referee: Craig Pawson
	Penalties
	Bowen (penalty missed); Walker-Peters (penalty scored); Souček (penalty scored); Pablo (penalty missed)		(penalty missed) Piroe; (penalty scored) Calvert-Lewin; (penalty scored) Aaronson; (penalty scored) Gnonto; (penalty scored) Struijk

26 April 2026 Semi-finals	Chelsea	1–0	Leeds United	Wembley
15:00 BST	Fernández 23'	Report		Stadium: Wembley Stadium; Attendance: 82,542; Referee: Jarred Gillett

=== EFL Cup ===
26 August 2025 Second round	Sheffield Wednesday	1–1 (3–0 p)	Leeds United	Sheffield
20:00 BST	Lowe 63'	Report	Bogle 81'	Stadium: Hillsborough Stadium; Attendance: 7,801; Referee: Robert Jones
	Penalties
	Bannan (penalty scored); Ugbo (penalty scored); Palmer (penalty scored)		(penalty missed) Piroe; (penalty missed) Calvert-Lewin; (penalty missed) Longstaff

== Statistics ==
No.	Pos.	Name	League		FA Cup		EFL Cup		Total		Discipline	
No.	Pos.	Name	Apps	Goals	Apps	Goals	Apps	Goals	Apps	Goals	Yellow card	Red card
1	GK	(Brazil) Lucas Perri	16	0	4	0	0	0	20	0	2	0
2	DF	(England) Jayden Bogle	32+2	1	2+2	0	0+1	1	34+5	2	8	0
3	DF	(Sweden) Gabriel Gudmundsson	31+1	0	3	1	0	0	34+1	1	5	1
4	MF	(Wales) Ethan Ampadu	35	1	4+1	0	0	0	39+1	1	12	0
5	DF	(Netherlands) Pascal Struijk	33+2	0	2	0	0	0	35+2	0	6	0
6	DF	(Wales) Joe Rodon	33+2	2	1+2	0	0	0	34+4	2	3	0
7	MF	(Wales) Daniel James	6+13	0	1	0	0+1	0	7+14	0	0	0
8	MF	(England) Sean Longstaff	10+13	2	2+2	1	1	0	13+15	3	3	0
9	FW	(England) Dominic Calvert-Lewin	30+5	14	1+2	1	0+1	0	31+8	15	3	0
10	FW	(Suriname) Joël Piroe	2+14	0	2+2	1	1	0	4+16	1	0	0
11	MF	(United States) Brenden Aaronson	30+7	4	1+3	0	1	0	32+10	4	3	0
14	FW	(Germany) Lukas Nmecha	10+20	6	4+1	1	1	0	15+21	7	2	0
15	DF	(Slovenia) Jaka Bijol	21+4	1	5	0	1	0	27+4	1	4	0
18	MF	(Germany) Anton Stach	28+1	5	1+3	0	0+1	0	29+5	5	3	0
19	FW	(Switzerland) Noah Okafor	19+9	8	4	0	1	0	24+9	8	2	0
20	MF	(England) Jack Harrison	1+10	0	1	0	1	0	3+10	0	1	0
22	MF	(Japan) Ao Tanaka	14+14	2	5	2	0	0	19+14	4	2	0
23	DF	(Belgium) Sebastiaan Bornauw	5+7	0	3+1	0	1	0	9+8	0	1	0
24	DF	(England) James Justin	21+9	2	3+2	1	0	0	24+11	3	4	0
25	DF	(England) Sam Byram	0+2	0	0+2	0	1	0	1+4	0	0	0
26	GK	(Wales) Karl Darlow	22	0	1	0	1	0	24	0	1	0
29	FW	(Italy) Wilfried Gnonto	4+19	0	3+2	1	0+1	0	7+22	1	3	0
40	MF	(Argentina) Facundo Buonanotte	0+3	0	1	0	0	0	1+3	0	1	0
44	MF	(Bulgaria) Ilia Gruev	15+8	0	1+1	0	1	0	17+9	0	2	0

== Transfers ==
=== In ===
Date	Pos.	Player	From	Fee	Ref.
23 June 2025	DF	(Slovenia) Jaka Bijol	(Italy) Udinese	£15,000,000	
1 July 2025	FW	(Germany) Lukas Nmecha	(Germany) VfL Wolfsburg	Free	
1 July 2025	DF	(Belgium) Sebastiaan Bornauw	(Germany) VfL Wolfsburg	£5,000,000	
8 July 2025	DF	(Sweden) Gabriel Gudmundsson	(France) Lille	£10,000,000	
9 July 2025	DF	(England) Louis Enahoro-Marcus	(England) Liverpool	Free	
10 July 2025	DF	(Wales) Jayden Lienou	(England) Manchester City	Undisclosed	
18 July 2025	MF	(England) Sean Longstaff	(England) Newcastle United	£12,000,000	
22 July 2025	MF	(Germany) Anton Stach	(Germany) TSG Hoffenheim	£17,000,000	
26 July 2025	GK	(Brazil) Lucas Perri	(France) Lyon	£15,600,000	
15 August 2025	FW	(England) Dominic Calvert-Lewin	(England) Everton	Free	
21 August 2025	FW	(Switzerland) Noah Okafor	(Italy) Milan	£18,000,000	
25 August 2025	DF	(England) James Justin	(England) Leicester City	£8,000,000	
20 January 2026	DF	(Nigeria) Leonard Ngenge	(Nigeria) Remo Stars	Undisclosed	
5 February 2026	MF	(Serbia) Edward Ibrovic-Fletcher	(England) Manchester United	Nominal Fee	

=== Out ===
Date	Pos.	Player	To	Fee	Ref.
16 June 2025	DF	(Denmark) Rasmus Kristensen	(Germany) Eintracht Frankfurt	Undisclosed	
30 June 2025	GK	(England) Harry Christy	Unattached	Released	
30 June 2025	MF	(Republic of Ireland) Cian Coleman	Unattached	Released	
30 June 2025	DF	(England) Connor Ferguson	Unattached	Released	
30 June 2025	DF	(Dominican Republic) Junior Firpo	Unattached	Released	
30 June 2025	MF	(France) Josuha Guilavogui	Unattached	Released	
30 June 2025	MF	(England) Max McFadden	Unattached	Released	
30 June 2025	FW	(England) Amari Miller	Unattached	Released	
30 June 2025	DF	(England) Kris Moore	Unattached	Released	
30 June 2025	DF	(England) Joe Richards	Unattached	Released	
30 June 2025	MF	(England) Joe Snowdon	Unattached	Released	
30 June 2025	FW	(England) Luca Thomas	Unattached	Released	
30 June 2025	MF	(England) Daniel Toulson	Unattached	Released	
11 August 2025	DF	(Portugal) Diogo Monteiro	(Portugal) Arouca	Undisclosed	
26 August 2025	MF	(England) Sam Greenwood	(Poland) Pogoń Szczecin	Undisclosed	
28 August 2025	FW	(England) Patrick Bamford	Released		
1 September 2025	MF	(England) Darko Gyabi	(England) Hull City	Free	

=== Loans in ===
Date from	Date to	Pos.	Player	From	Ref.
15 January 2026	30 June 2026	MF	(Argentina) Facundo Buonanotte	(England) Brighton & Hove Albion	

=== Loans out ===
Date from	Date to	Pos.	Player	To	Ref.
4 July 2025	30 June 2026	DF	(Austria) Maximilian Wöber	(Germany) Werder Bremen	
5 August 2025	1 January 2026	MF	(Wales) Charlie Crew	(England) Doncaster Rovers	
9 August 2025	30 June 2026	FW	(Spain) Mateo Joseph	(Spain) Mallorca	
9 August 2025	30 June 2026	FW	(England) Joe Gelhardt	(England) Hull City	
28 August 2025	30 June 2026	DF	(Switzerland) Isaac Schmidt	(Germany) Werder Bremen	
28 August 2025	30 June 2026	FW	(Belgium) Largie Ramazani	(Spain) Valencia	
1 October 2025	3 February 2026 (Note: On 31 October, Mahady's loan at Scunthorpe was extended by a further month. On 5 December, the loan agreement was extended again until early January and again for a third time until early February)	GK	(Scotland) Rory Mahady	(England) Scunthorpe United	
25 October 2025	22 November 2025	GK	(England) Darryl Ombang	(England) Darlington	
26 December 2025	31 May 2026	FW	(England) Connor Douglas	(England) Buxton	
12 January 2026	9 February 2026	MF	(Scotland) Devon Brockie	(England) Cleethorpes Town	
14 January 2026	31 May 2026	FW	(England) Harry Gray	(England) Rotherham United	
19 January 2026	31 May 2026	FW	(England) Jack Harrison	(Italy) Fiorentina	
2 February 2026	31 May 2026	DF	(England) Reuben Lopata-White	(Scotland) Greenock Morton	
14 March 2026	31 May 2026	GK	(England) Darryl Ombang	(England) FC United of Manchester	
26 March 2026	31 May 2026	MF	(Italy) Kenneth Mensah	(England) Scarborough Athletic	
