= Wilfried Gnonto =

Italian footballer (born 2003)

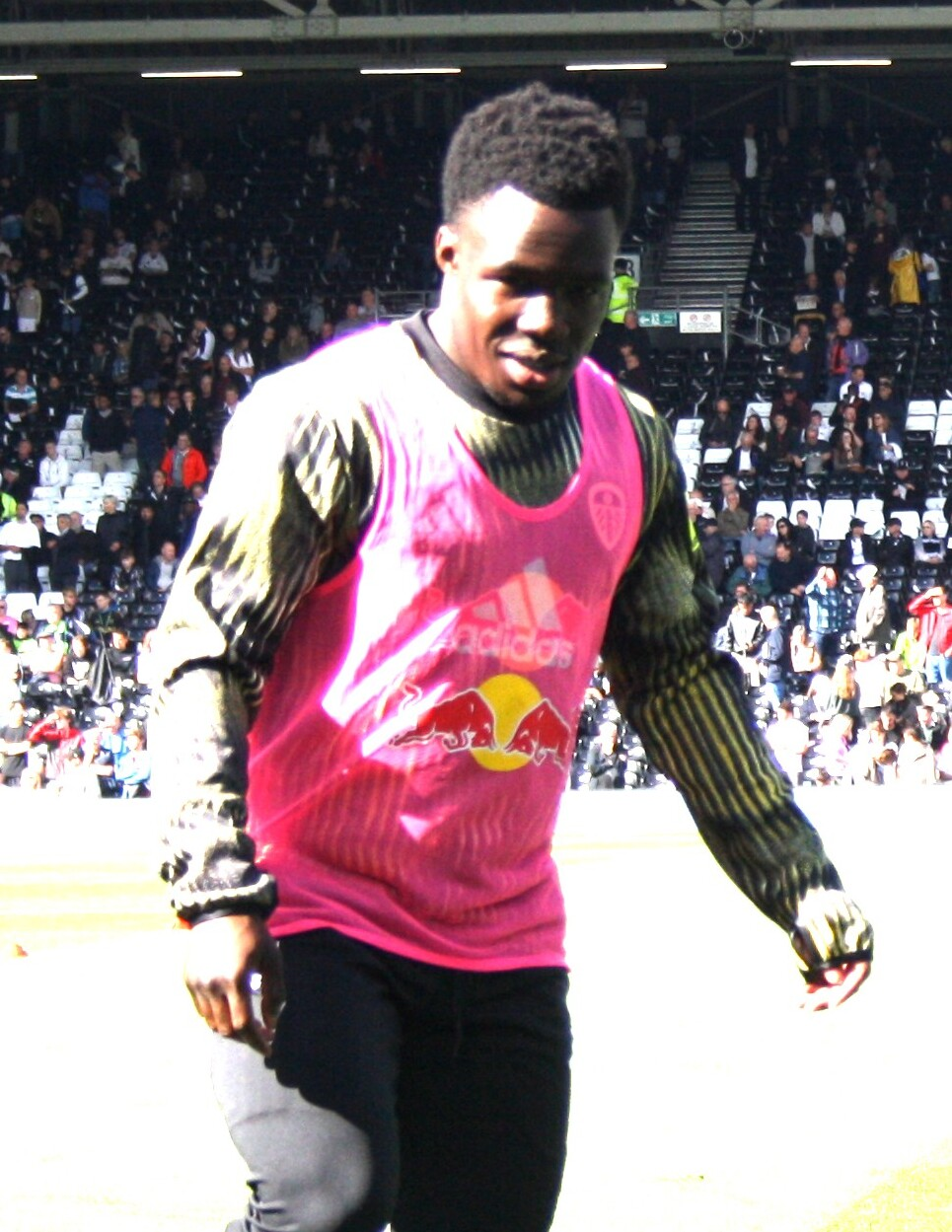
- Gnonto with Leeds United in 2025

Personal information
- Full name: Degnand Wilfried Gnonto
- Date of birth: 5 November 2003 (age 23)
- Place of birth: Verbania, Italy
- Height: 1.72 m (5 ft 8 in)
- Positions: Forward; winger

Team information
- Current team: Fiorentina (on loan from Leeds United)
- Number: 29

Youth career
- 2008–2010: Baveno
- 2010–2012: Suno
- 2012–2020: Inter Milan

Senior career*
Years	Team	Apps	(Gls)
2020–2021	Zürich II	3	(2)
2020–2022	Zürich	65	(9)
2022–	Leeds United	126	(19)
2026–	→ Fiorentina (loan)	9	(0)

International career^{‡}
2018–2019	Italy U16	10	(1)
2019–2020	Italy U17	10	(5)
2021	Italy U18	1	(0)
2021–2022	Italy U19	10	(5)
2023–2025	Italy U21	17	(5)
2022–2023	Italy	13	(1)
Medal record
Men's Football
Representing Italy
UEFA Nations League
Third place	2023 Netherlands
- * Club domestic league appearances and goals as of 14:30, 9 November 2026 (UTC) ‡ National team caps and goals as of 22 June 2025

Degnand Wilfried Gnonto (Italian pronunciation: [ˈvilfrid ˈɲonto]; born 5 November 2003) is an Italian professional footballer who plays as a winger for Serie A club Fiorentina FC on loan from Leeds.

== Early life ==
Gnonto was born in Verbania, Italy, in 2003 to Ivorian parents and he grew up in Baveno, where he attended a liceo classico before switching to pursue secondary education at a liceo scientifico.

== Club career ==
=== FC Zürich ===
A youth product of Inter Milan since the age of nine, Gnonto joined Swiss club Zürich on 23 April 2020. Gnonto made his professional debut with Zürich as a substitute in a 4–1 away Swiss Super League win over FC Vaduz on 24 October 2020, and assisted his team's final goal. He scored his first professional goal on 21 May 2021, once again in a 4–1 league home win over FC Vaduz, after replacing Antonio Marchesano in the second half.

In his second season, he won the 2021–22 Swiss Super League title with the club, with four games remaining.

=== Leeds United ===
On 2 September 2022, Gnonto joined Leeds United on a five-year deal for an undisclosed fee. He made his Premier League debut on 29 October, in Leeds’ 2–1 win against Liverpool at Anfield, coming on as a 72nd-minute substitute for Jack Harrison and opening the action that led to the winning goal by Crysencio Summerville. On 5 November, he again replaced Harrison in the second half of the league match against Bournemouth, eventually assisting Summerville for his second consecutive winning goal.

On 4 January 2023, Gnonto scored his first Premier League goal for Leeds, a 28th minute opener in a 2–2 home draw against West Ham United. Two weeks later he scored a brace for Leeds in an FA Cup third round replay against Cardiff City at Elland Road, a volley within the first minute and a goal scored in the 36th minute in a 5–2 win.

On 8 February 2023, he scored less than a minute into Leeds' 2–2 draw with Manchester United, following a pass from Patrick Bamford. In doing so, he became the youngest overseas player to score at Old Trafford in a Premier League fixture.

In August 2023, Gnonto refused to play for Leeds in an attempt to force a transfer away from the club, following Leeds' relegation to the EFL Championship at the end of the 2022–23 season: he then returned to training and officially apologized to manager Daniel Farke at the end of the month. On 26 August, in his first game since his return, Gnonto scored a goal in a 4–3 away league win over Ipswich Town.

In the 2023–24 season, Gnonto, an almost-constant regular on the right wing in Farke’s starting XI, had a run of form that saw him net seven goals from February to mid-March 2024. On 16 May, he set up a goal in Leeds's 4–0 win over Norwich City in the EFL Championship play-off semi-final, which allowed them to advance to the final against Southampton at Wembley Stadium.

In the 2024–25 season, Gnonto scored a career-high nine league goals, which was tied with Brenden Aaronson for the fourth-most on the team, adding six league assists, which was the sixth-most on the team. On 3 May 2025, Gnonto scored a goal and added an assist in the team's 2–1 win over Plymouth Argyle at Home Park, which saw Leeds clinch the 2024–25 EFL Championship title and get promoted back to the Premier League. He provided the match-winning assist to Manor Solomon in the 91st minute. On 4 May 2025, Gnonto was voted Leeds United Young Player of the Year for the 2024–25 season.

==== Loan to Fiorentina ====
On 1 September 2026, Gnonto joined Serie A side Fiorentina on loan with an option to buy.

== International career ==
Gnonto represented Italy at under-17 level in the 2019 FIFA U-17 World Cup; he was one of the team's key players, scoring three goals en-route to the quarter-finals, where Italy lost out 2–0 to eventual champions Brazil. His opening individual goal in Italy's 2–1 win over Mexico in their second group match – which allowed them to advanced to the round of 16 – was later named the "Goal of the Tournament." His other two goals came in Italy's opening group match, a 5–0 win over Solomon Islands.

In May 2022, after being called by Roberto Mancini to join a training camp for the Italy national team, Gnonto was included in the final 30-player Azzurri squad for the 2022 Finalissima. On 4 June 2022, Gnonto made his senior debut for Italy in a UEFA Nations League game against Germany, coming on as a substitute and providing an assist in a 1–1 home draw. On 14 June, in Italy's fourth group match, he scored his first international goal in a 5–2 away loss to Germany, to become the youngest goalscorer for Italy, aged 18 years and 222 days, breaking the previous record held by Bruno Nicolè since 1958.

In June 2023, Gnonto was included in Italy's squad for the 2022–23 UEFA Nations League Finals. On 18 June, Gnonto started in Italy's 3–2 win over Netherlands in the third-place match of the tournament, contributing to Davide Frattesi's goal, who scored after the former's shot was blocked.

== Style of play ==
Gnonto is a quick, agile, and technically gifted forward, with a low centre of gravity, who is known for his dribbling ability and close control at speed. He has also stood out for his work-rate on the pitch. Although he is a right-footed player, who is often used as a left winger, a position which allows him to drift out wide, take on opponents, and strike at goal, he is able to play anywhere across the front line, courtesy of his ability to use either foot, and has also been used as a second striker, or even as a right winger, or striker on occasion. Despite his diminutive stature (standing at 1.72m/5 ft 7 in), he possesses significant elevation and physical strength, which allows him to retain the ball under pressure. His qualities and playing style have led him to be compared to English winger Raheem Sterling in the media; Gnonto has also cited his idol, Argentine footballer Lionel Messi, as a major influence. Martin Hardy of The Times also likened Gnonto to compatriot Paolo Di Canio in 2024.

Considered to be a promising young player in the media, in 2020, he was named one of the "Next Generation 2020: 60 of the best young talents in world football" by The Guardian.

== Career statistics ==
=== Club ===
As of match played 9 November 2026

Appearances and goals by club, season and competition
Club	Season	League			National cup (Note: Includes Swiss Cup, FA Cup, Coppa Italia)		League cup (Note: Includes EFL Cup)		Europe		Other		Total	
Club	Season	Division	Apps	Goals	Apps	Goals	Apps	Goals	Apps	Goals	Apps	Goals	Apps	Goals
Zürich II	2020–21	Swiss Promotion League	3	2	—		—		—		2 (Note: Appearances in Swiss Promotion League relegation play-offs)	1	5	3
Zürich	2020–21	Swiss Super League	26	1	0	0	—		—		—		26	1
Zürich	2021–22	Swiss Super League	33	8	3	2	—		—		—		36	10
Zürich	2022–23	Swiss Super League	6	0	1	0	—		5 (Note: Two appearances in UEFA Champions League, three appearances and one goal in UEFA Europa League)	1	—		12	1
Zürich	Total		65	9	4	2	—		5	1	—		74	12
Leeds United U21	2022–23	—			—		—		—		2 (Note: Appearances in EFL Trophy)	0	2	0
Leeds United	2022–23	Premier League	24	2	3	2	1	0	—		—		28	4
Leeds United	2023–24	Championship	36	8	4	1	1	0	—		3 (Note: Appearances in Championship play-offs)	0	44	9
Leeds United	2024–25	Championship	43	9	2	0	1	0	—		—		46	9
Leeds United	2025–26	Premier League	23	0	5	1	1	0	—		—		29	1
Leeds United	Total		126	19	14	4	4	0	—		3	0	147	23
Fiorentina (loan)	2026–27	Serie A	9	0	1	1	—		—		—		10	1
Career total			203	30	19	7	4	0	5	1	7	1	238	39

=== International ===
As of match played 12 September 2023

Appearances and goals by national team and year
National team	Year	Apps	Goals
Italy	2022	8	1
Italy	2023	5	0
Total		13	1

Italy score listed first, score column indicates score after each Gnonto goal.

List of international goals scored by Wilfried Gnonto
No.	Date	Venue	Cap	Opponent	Score	Result	Competition
1	14 June 2022	Borussia-Park, Mönchengladbach, Germany	4	Germany	1–5	2–5	2022–23 UEFA Nations League A

== Honours ==
Zürich

- Swiss Super League: 2021–22

Leeds United

- EFL Championship: 2024–25

Individual

- Leeds United Young Player of the Year: 2024–25
