= 2024–25 Leeds United F.C. season =

105th season in existence of Leeds United FC

Leeds United
2024–25 season
- Chairman: Paraag Marathe
- Manager: Daniel Farke
- Stadium: Elland Road
- Championship: 1st (promoted)
- FA Cup: Fourth round
- EFL Cup: First round
- Top goalscorer: League: Joël Piroe (19); All: Joël Piroe (19)
- Highest home attendance: 36,804 vs Sunderland (17 February 2025, Championship)
- Lowest home attendance: 34,401 vs Millwall (12 March 2025, Championship)
- Average home league attendance: 36,432
Home colours	Away colours

The 2024–25 season saw Leeds United competing in the Championship (known as the Sky Bet Championship for sponsorship reasons) for a second successive season.

== Pre-season and friendlies ==
Leeds United announced pre-season friendlies against Valencia and Harrogate Town.

Win Draw Loss Fixtures

19 July 2024 Friendly	Harrogate Town	0–3	Leeds United	Harrogate
19:30 BST		Report	Firpo 12'; Rutter 61'; Chambers 90'	Stadium: Wetherby Road; Attendance: 3,920; Referee: Andrew Kitchen

24 July 2024 Friendly	Leeds United	4–1	Hannover 96	Harsewinkel
15:30 CEST	Gruev 7'; Piroe 27'; Joseph 51', 70'	Report	Gindorf 62'	Stadium: Hotel-Residence Klosterpforte; Attendance: 0 Referee: Henry Schroder

27 July 2024 Friendly	Schalke 04	0–2	Leeds United	Hamm
15:30 CEST		Report	Joseph 57'; Piroe 66'	Stadium: Hellmeister Arena; Attendance: 0 Referee: Felix Weller

3 August 2024 Friendly	Leeds United	2–1	Valencia	Leeds
15:00 BST	Joseph 14'; Rutter 41'	Report	Tejón 89'	Stadium: Elland Road; Attendance: 32,973; Referee: James Bell

== Competitions ==
=== Overall record ===
Competition	First match	Last match	Starting round	Final position	Record							
Competition	First match	Last match	Starting round	Final position	Pld	W	D	L	GF	GA	GD	Win %
Championship	10 August 2024	3 May 2025	Matchday 1	Winners	46	29	13	4	95	30	+65	63.04
FA Cup	11 January 2025	8 February 2025	Third round	Fourth round	2	1	0	1	1	2	−1	50.00
EFL Cup	14 August 2024		First round	First round	1	0	0	1	0	3	−3	0.00
Total					49	30	13	6	96	35	+61	61.22

Source: Soccerway

=== Championship ===
==== League table ====
Pos	Team	Pld	W	D	L	GF	GA	GD	Pts	Promotion, qualification or relegation
1	Leeds United (C, P)	46	29	13	4	95	30	+65	100	Promotion to the Premier League
2	Burnley (P)	46	28	16	2	69	16	+53	100	Promotion to the Premier League
3	Sheffield United	46	28	8	10	63	36	+27	90 (Note: Sheffield United were deducted two points for defaulting on payments to other clubs during the 2022–23 and 2023–24 seasons, with a further two points suspended.)	Qualified for the Championship play-offs
4	Sunderland (O, P)	46	21	13	12	58	44	+14	76	Qualified for the Championship play-offs
5	Coventry City	46	20	9	17	64	58	+6	69	Qualified for the Championship play-offs

Source: English Football League
Rules for classification: 1) Points; 2) Goal difference; 3) Number of goals scored; 4) Head-to-head results; 5) Wins; 6) Away goals; 7) Penalty points (sec 9.5); 8) Number of 12-point sending off offences; 9) Play-off (only if needed to determine promotion/relegation)
(C) Champions; (O) Play-off winners; (P) Promoted

==== Results summary ====
Overall								Home						Away					
Pld	W	D	L	GF	GA	GD	Pts	W	D	L	GF	GA	GD	W	D	L	GF	GA	GD
46	29	13	4	95	30	+65	100	18	4	1	61	12	+49	11	9	3	34	18	+16

Source: Soccerway

==== Results by round ====
Round	1	2	3	4	5	6	7	8	9	10	11	12	13	14	15	16	17	18	19	20	21	22	23	24	25	26	27	28	29	30	31	32	33	34	35	36	37	38	39	40	41	42	43	44	45	46
Ground	H	A	A	H	H	A	H	A	A	H	H	A	H	A	H	A	H	A	H	H	A	H	A	A	H	A	H	H	A	H	A	A	H	A	H	A	H	A	H	A	A	H	A	H	H	A
Result	D	D	W	W	L	W	W	D	D	W	W	D	W	L	W	W	W	L	W	W	D	W	W	W	D	D	W	W	D	W	W	W	W	W	D	L	W	D	D	D	W	W	W	W	W	W
Position	12	16	6	4	9	6	5	5	5	3	3	3	2	3	3	1	1	3	2	2	2	2	1	1	1	1	1	1	1	1	1	1	1	1	1	1	1	1	2	3	1	1	1	1	1	1

Source: Soccerway
A = Away; H = Home; W = Win; D = Draw; L = Loss

==== Matches ====
10 August 2024 1	Leeds United	3–3	Portsmouth	Leeds
12:30 BST	Struijk 10' (pen.); Gnonto 46'; Aaronson 90+5'	Report	Sørensen 23'; Lang 41', 90+2' (pen.)	Stadium: Elland Road; Attendance: 36,432; Referee: Oliver Langford

17 August 2024 2	West Bromwich Albion	0–0	Leeds United	West Bromwich
12:30 BST		Report		Stadium: Hawthorns; Attendance: 25,329; Referee: Sam Allison

23 August 2024 3	Sheffield Wednesday	0–2	Leeds United	Sheffield
20:00 BST		Report	Aaronson 24'; James 48'	Stadium: Hillsborough; Attendance: 28,800; Referee: Simon Hooper

31 August 2024 4	Leeds United	2–0	Hull City	Leeds
15:00 BST	Joseph 63'; Piroe 81'	Report		Stadium: Elland Road; Attendance: 36,517; Referee: Gavin Ward

14 September 2024 5	Leeds United	0–1	Burnley	Leeds
12:30 BST		Report	Koleosho 18'	Stadium: Elland Road; Attendance: 36,405; Referee: James Bell

21 September 2024 6	Cardiff City	0–2	Leeds United	Cardiff
15:00 BST		Report	Ramazani 30'; Piroe 87'	Stadium: Cardiff City Stadium; Attendance: 23,207; Referee: Josh Smith

28 September 2024 7	Leeds United	3–0	Coventry City	Leeds
15:00 BST	Gnonto 16'; Bogle 49'; Piroe 79'	Report		Stadium: Elland Road; Attendance: 36,625; Referee: Gavin Ward

1 October 2024 8	Norwich City	1–1	Leeds United	Norwich
19:45 BST	Sargent 15' (pen.)	Report	Ramazani 60'	Stadium: Carrow Road; Attendance: 26,261; Referee: Stephen Martin

4 October 2024 9	Sunderland	2–2	Leeds United	Sunderland
20:00 BST	Rigg 9'; Firpo 90+7' (o.g.)	Report	Piroe 22'; Firpo 56'	Stadium: Stadium of Light; Attendance: 41,769; Referee: Tim Robinson

18 October 2024 10	Leeds United	2–0	Sheffield United	Leeds
20:00 BST	Struijk 69'; Joseph 90'	Report		Stadium: Elland Road; Attendance: 36,695; Referee: Lewis Smith

22 October 2024 11	Leeds United	2–1	Watford	Leeds
19:45 BST	Ramazani 4'; Aaronson 7'	Report	Baah 47'	Stadium: Elland Road; Attendance: 34,968; Referee: Anthony Backhouse

26 October 2024 12	Bristol City	0–0	Leeds United	Bristol
12:30 BST		Report		Stadium: Ashton Gate; Attendance: 25,283; Referee: James Linington

2 November 2024 13	Leeds United	3–0	Plymouth Argyle	Leeds
15:00 BST	James 30'; Piroe 33'; Aaronson 38'	Report		Stadium: Elland Road; Attendance: 36,066; Referee: David Webb

6 November 2024 14	Millwall	1–0	Leeds United	Bermondsey
19:45 BST	Tanganga 40'	Report		Stadium: The Den; Attendance: 16,693; Referee: Leigh Doughty

9 November 2024 15	Leeds United	2–0	Queens Park Rangers	Leeds
15:00 BST	Bogle 19'; Piroe 90+5'	Report		Stadium: Elland Road; Attendance: 36,011; Referee: Matt Donohue

24 November 2024 16	Swansea City	3–4	Leeds United	Swansea
15:00 BST	Darling 8'; Cullen 45+3'; Bianchini 90'	Report	Solomon 20', 73'; Cabango 55' (o.g.); Gnonto 90+1'	Stadium: Swansea.com Stadium; Attendance: 17,125; Referee: Dean Whitestone

27 November 2024 17	Leeds United	3–0	Luton Town	Leeds
19:45 BST	Byram 10'; Piroe 45+1'; James 81'	Report		Stadium: Elland Road; Attendance: 35,340; Referee: Sam Allison

30 November 2024 18	Blackburn Rovers	1–0	Leeds United	Blackburn
13:30 BST	Cantwell 22' (pen.)	Report		Stadium: Ewood Park; Attendance: 21,492; Referee: Lewis Smith

7 December 2024 19	Leeds United	2–0	Derby County	Leeds
12:30 BST	Rodon 39'; Wöber 44'	Report		Stadium: Elland Road; Attendance: 36,468; Referee: Matt Donohue

10 December 2024 20	Leeds United	3–1	Middlesbrough	Leeds
20:00 BST	Gnonto 14'; James 74'; Aaronson 90+2'	Report	Wöber 54' (o.g.)	Stadium: Elland Road; Attendance: 36,422; Referee: Ben Toner

14 December 2024 21	Preston North End	1–1	Leeds United	Preston
12:30 BST	Potts 23'	Report	Whatmough 90+3' (o.g.)	Stadium: Deepdale; Attendance: 19,508; Referee: John Busby

21 December 2024 22	Leeds United	4–0	Oxford United	Leeds
15:00 BST	James 9'; Bogle 57'; Aaronson 67'; Solomon 73'	Report		Stadium: Elland Road; Attendance: 36,646; Referee: James Bell

26 December 2024 23	Stoke City	0–2	Leeds United	Stoke
20:00 BST		Report	Piroe 42', 63'	Stadium: Bet365 Stadium; Attendance: 24,738; Referee: Stephen Martin

29 December 2024 24	Derby County	0–1	Leeds United	Derby
17:45 BST		Report	Aaronson 79'	Stadium: Pride Park; Attendance: 32,240; Referee: Andy Davies

1 January 2025 25	Leeds United	1–1	Blackburn Rovers	Leeds
15:00 BST	Struijk 88' (pen.)	Report	Batth 90'	Stadium: Elland Road; Attendance: 36,645; Referee: Oliver Langford

4 January 2025 26	Hull City	3–3	Leeds United	Hull
15:00 BST	Kamara 5', 89'; João Pedro 81'	Report	Tanaka 46'; James 62'; Piroe 72'	Stadium: MKM Stadium; Attendance: 24,463; Referee: Anthony Backhouse

19 January 2025 27	Leeds United	3–0	Sheffield Wednesday	Leeds
12:00 BST	Solomon 3'; Ramazani 88'; Tanaka 90+6'	Report		Stadium: Elland Road; Attendance: 36,685; Referee: David Webb

22 January 2025 28	Leeds United	2–0	Norwich City	Leeds
19:45 BST	Solomon 1'; James 65'	Report		Stadium: Elland Road; Attendance: 35,157; Referee: Matt Donohue

27 January 2025 29	Burnley	0–0	Leeds United	Burnley
20:00 BST		Report		Stadium: Turf Moor; Attendance: 21,329; Referee: Josh Smith

1 February 2025 30	Leeds United	7–0	Cardiff City	Leeds
15:00 BST	Aaronson 6'; Solomon 13'; James 50'; Piroe 65' (pen.), 90+5'; Gnonto 67'; Joseph 88'	Report		Stadium: Elland Road; Attendance: 35,810; Referee: Michael Salisbury

5 February 2025 31	Coventry City	0–2	Leeds United	Coventry
19:45 BST		Report	Piroe 17'; Bogle 26'	Stadium: Coventry Building Society Arena; Attendance: 28,008; Referee: Dean Whitestone

11 February 2025 32	Watford	0–4	Leeds United	Watford
19:45 BST		Report	James 20', 28'; Solomon 35'; Piroe 62'	Stadium: Vicarage Road; Attendance: 19,582; Referee: Oliver Langford

17 February 2025 33	Leeds United	2–1	Sunderland	Leeds
20:00 BST	Struijk 78', 90+5'	Report	Isidor 32'	Stadium: Elland Road; Attendance: 36,804; Referee: Stuart Attwell

24 February 2025 34	Sheffield United	1–3	Leeds United	Sheffield
20:00 BST	Meslier 14' (o.g.)	Report	Firpo 72'; Tanaka 89'; Piroe 90'	Stadium: Bramall Lane; Attendance: 29,702; Referee: David Webb

1 March 2025 35	Leeds United	1–1	West Bromwich Albion	Leeds
12:30 BST	Firpo 9'	Report	Furlong 39'	Stadium: Elland Road; Attendance: 36,705; Referee: Farai Hallam

9 March 2025 36	Portsmouth	1–0	Leeds United	Portsmouth
12:00 BST	Bishop 61'	Report		Stadium: Fratton Park; Attendance: 20,314; Referee: Robert Jones

12 March 2025 37	Leeds United	2–0	Millwall	Leeds
19:45 BST	Cooper 3' (o.g.); Tanaka 85'	Report		Stadium: Elland Road; Attendance: 34,401; Referee: Dean Whitestone

15 March 2025 38	Queens Park Rangers	2–2	Leeds United	Shepherd's Bush
12:30 BST	Saitō 17'; Cook 30'	Report	Fox 40' (o.g.); Bogle 51'	Stadium: Loftus Road; Attendance: 17,457; Referee: Tim Robinson

29 March 2025 39	Leeds United	2–2	Swansea City	Leeds
15:00 GMT	Aaronson 1'; Gnonto 86'	Report	Darling 64'; Vipotnik 90+6'	Stadium: Elland Road; Attendance: 35,574; Referee: Ben Toner

5 April 2025 40	Luton Town	1–1	Leeds United	Luton
12:30 BST	Jones 15'	Report	James 28'	Stadium: Kenilworth Road; Attendance: 11,867; Referee: Thomas Bramall

8 April 2025 41	Middlesbrough	0–1	Leeds United	Middlesbrough
19:45 BST		Report	James 2'	Stadium: Riverside Stadium; Attendance: 28,729; Referee: Andrew Kitchen

12 April 2025 42	Leeds United	2–1	Preston North End	Leeds
12:30 BST	Solomon 3'; Bogle 13'	Report	Kesler-Hayden 6'	Stadium: Elland Road; Attendance: 35,747; Referee: John Busby

18 April 2025 43	Oxford United	0–1	Leeds United	Oxford
20:00 BST		Report	Solomon 33'	Stadium: Kassam Stadium; Attendance: 11,537; Referee: Dean Whitestone

21 April 2025 44	Leeds United	6–0	Stoke City	Leeds
15:00 BST	Piroe 6', 8', 20', 41'; Firpo 26'; Gnonto 59'	Report		Stadium: Elland Road; Attendance: 36,644; Referee: Darren Bond

28 April 2025 45	Leeds United	4–0	Bristol City	Leeds
20:00 BST	Tanaka 21'; Gnonto 55'; Ramazani 82', 90+4'	Report		Stadium: Elland Road; Attendance: 36,310; Referee: James Bell

3 May 2025 46	Plymouth Argyle	1–2	Leeds United	Plymouth
12:30 BST	Byram 18' (o.g.)	Report	Gnonto 53'; Solomon 90+1'	Stadium: Home Park; Attendance: 16,758; Referee: Jeremy Simpson

=== FA Cup ===
11 January 2025 Third round	Leeds United	1–0	Harrogate Town	Leeds
17:45 GMT	Ramazani 59'	Report		Stadium: Elland Road; Attendance: 35,584; Referee: James Bell

8 February 2025 Fourth round	Leeds United	0–2	Millwall	Leeds
12:15 GMT		Report	Azeez 30', 55'	Stadium: Elland Road; Attendance: 34,923; Referee: Gavin Ward

=== EFL Cup ===
14 August 2024 First round	Leeds United	0–3	Middlesbrough	Leeds
20:00 BST		Report	Dijksteel 50'; Burgzorg 60'; Coburn 67'	Stadium: Elland Road; Attendance: 35,150; Referee: Anthony Backhouse

== Statistics ==
No.	Pos.	Name	League		FA Cup		EFL Cup		Total		Discipline	
No.	Pos.	Name	Apps	Goals	Apps	Goals	Apps	Goals	Apps	Goals	Yellow card	Red card
1	GK	(France) Illan Meslier	39	0	0	0	0	0	39	0	0	0
2	DF	(England) Jayden Bogle	44	6	0	0	0+1	0	44+1	6	12	0
3	DF	(Dominican Republic) Junior Firpo	30+2	5	0+2	0	1	0	31+4	5	7	0
4	MF	(Wales) Ethan Ampadu	26+3	0	2	0	1	0	29+3	0	8	0
5	DF	(Netherlands) Pascal Struijk	31+4	5	2	0	0+1	0	33+5	5	4	0
6	DF	(Wales) Joe Rodon	46	1	0+1	0	1	0	47+1	1	5	0
7	MF	(Wales) Daniel James	30+6	12	0+1	0	0	0	30+7	12	4	0
8	MF	(England) Joe Rothwell	24+12	0	2	0	1	0	27+12	0	2	0
9	FW	(England) Patrick Bamford	0+17	0	0	0	1	0	1+17	0	0	0
10	FW	(Netherlands) Joël Piroe	36+10	19	0+1	0	1	0	37+11	19	2	0
11	MF	(United States) Brenden Aaronson	43+3	9	0	0	1	0	44+3	9	1	0
14	FW	(Israel) Manor Solomon	30+9	10	1+1	0	0	0	31+10	10	3	0
17	FW	(Belgium) Largie Ramazani	7+22	6	2	1	0	0	9+22	7	3	0
19	FW	(Spain) Mateo Joseph	12+27	3	2	0	0	0	14+27	3	0	0
22	MF	(Japan) Ao Tanaka	37+6	5	0+2	0	0	0	37+8	5	8	0
23	MF	(France) Josuha Guilavogui	0+16	0	2	0	0	0	2+16	0	2	0
24	FW	(France) Georginio Rutter	1	0	0	0	0+1	0	1+1	0	0	0
25	DF	(England) Sam Byram	16+20	1	2	0	1	0	19+20	1	5	0
26	GK	(Wales) Karl Darlow	7	0	2	0	1	0	10	0	1	0
29	FW	(Italy) Wilfried Gnonto	26+17	9	2	0	0+1	0	28+18	9	5	0
30	FW	(England) Joe Gelhardt	0+2	0	0	0	1	0	1+2	0	0	0
33	DF	(Switzerland) Isaac Schmidt	0+12	0	2	0	0	0	2+12	0	0	0
37	DF	(England) James Debayo	0+1	0	0+1	0	0	0	0+2	0	0	0
39	DF	(Austria) Maximilian Wöber	2+6	1	0	0	1	0	3+6	1	1	0
42	MF	(Scotland) Sam Chambers	0+1	0	1	0	0	0	1+1	0	0	0
44	MF	(Bulgaria) Ilia Gruev	20+3	0	0+1	0	0+1	0	20+5	0	3	0
45	FW	(England) Harry Gray	0+1	0	0	0	0	0	0+1	0	0	0
50	MF	(Wales) Charlie Crew	0+1	0	0	0	0	0	0+1	0	0	0

== Transfers ==
=== In ===
Date	Pos.	Name	From	Fee	Ref.
2 July 2024	DF	(Wales) Joe Rodon	(England) Tottenham Hotspur	£10,000,000	
8 July 2024	GK	(England) Alex Cairns	(England) Salford City	Undisclosed	
20 July 2024	DF	(England) Jayden Bogle	(England) Sheffield United	Undisclosed	
22 August 2024	FW	(Belgium) Largie Ramazani	(Spain) Almería	Undisclosed	
30 August 2024	MF	(Japan) Ao Tanaka	(Germany) Fortuna Düsseldorf	£3,000,000	
30 August 2024	DF	(Switzerland) Isaac Schmidt	(Switzerland) St. Gallen	£2,500,000	
23 October 2024	MF	(France) Josuha Guilavogui	Unattached	Free	
7 February 2025	GK	(Australia) Robbie Cook	(Australia) Perth Glory	Undisclosed	

=== Out ===
Date	Pos.	Name	To	Fee	Ref.
30 June 2024	MF	(Northern Ireland) Charlie Allen	Unattached	Released	
30 June 2024	DF	(England) Luke Ayling	(England) Middlesbrough	Free	
30 June 2024	MF	(England) Lewis Bate	(England) Stockport County	Free	
30 June 2024	FW	(France) Keenan Carole	Unattached	Released	
30 June 2024	DF	(Scotland) Liam Cooper	Unattached	Released	
30 June 2024	DF	(England) Cuba Dibo	Unattached	Released	
30 June 2024	DF	(England) Cody Drameh	Unattached	Released	
30 June 2024	DF	(Wales) Scott Godden	Unattached	Released	
30 June 2024	DF	(Germany) Robin Koch	(Germany) Eintracht Frankfurt	Free	
30 June 2024	FW	(Colombia) Ian Poveda	Unattached	Released	
30 June 2024	DF	(England) Jamie Shackleton	Unattached	Released	
30 June 2024	MF	(Norway) Morten Spencer	Unattached	Released	
30 June 2024	DF	(England) Harvey Sutcliffe	Unattached	Released	
30 June 2024	GK	(Netherlands) Dani van den Heuvel	Unattached	Released	
1 July 2024	MF	(Spain) Marc Roca	(Spain) Real Betis	Undisclosed	
2 July 2024	MF	(England) Archie Gray	(England) Tottenham Hotspur	£40,000,000	
7 July 2024	GK	(Norway) Kristoffer Klaesson	(Poland) Raków Częstochowa	Undisclosed	
8 July 2024	DF	(England) Charlie Cresswell	(France) Toulouse	Undisclosed	
9 July 2024	DF	(Spain) Diego Llorente	(Spain) Real Betis	£2,500,000	
16 July 2024	MF	(Finland) Glen Kamara	(France) Rennes	Undisclosed	
3 August 2024	FW	(Netherlands) Crysencio Summerville	(England) West Ham United	£25,000,000	
19 August 2024	FW	(France) Georginio Rutter	(England) Brighton & Hove Albion	£40,000,000	
31 January 2025	FW	(England) Sonny Perkins	(England) Leyton Orient	Undisclosed	
3 February 2025	DF	(Scotland) Jeremiah Chilokoa-Mullen	(Scotland) Dunfermline Athletic	Free	

=== Loan in ===
Date from	Date to	Pos.	Name	From	Ref.
11 July 2024	30 June 2025	MF	(England) Joe Rothwell	(England) Bournemouth	
27 August 2024	30 June 2025	FW	(Israel) Manor Solomon	(England) Tottenham Hotspur	

=== Loan out ===
Date from	Date to	Pos.	Name	To	Ref.
1 July 2024	30 June 2025	MF	(England) Jack Harrison	(England) Everton	
1 July 2024	31 January 2025	FW	(England) Sonny Perkins	(England) Leyton Orient	
2 July 2024	30 June 2025	MF	(England) Darko Gyabi	(England) Plymouth Argyle	
5 July 2024	30 June 2025	MF	(England) Sam Greenwood	(England) Preston North End	
19 July 2024	30 June 2025	DF	(Denmark) Rasmus Kristensen	(Germany) Eintracht Frankfurt	
17 October 2024	5 January 2025	FW	(England) Luca Thomas	(England) York City	
18 October 2024	5 January 2025	MF	(Republic of Ireland) Cian Coleman	(England) Buxton	
24 October 2024	21 November 2024	DF	(England) Joe Richards	(England) South Shields	
29 November 2024	1 January 2025	DF	(England) Connor Ferguson	(England) Farsley Celtic	
14 January 2025	30 June 2025	MF	(Wales) Charlie Crew	(England) Doncaster Rovers	
15 January 2025	30 June 2025	FW	(England) Joe Gelhardt	(England) Hull City	
16 January 2025	30 June 2025	FW	(England) Luca Thomas	(England) FC Halifax Town	
10 February 2025	30 June 2025	MF	(Republic of Ireland) Cian Coleman	(England) Buxton	
