= Ao Tanaka =

Japanese footballer (born 1998)

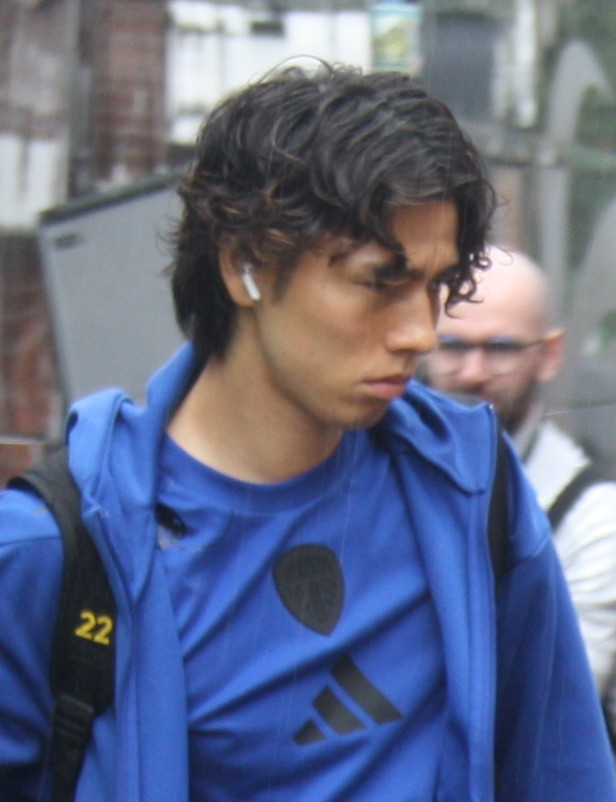
- Tanaka with Leeds United in 2025

Personal information
- Full name: Ao Tanaka
- Date of birth: 10 September 1998 (age 28)
- Place of birth: Kawasaki, Kanagawa, Japan
- Height: 1.80 m (5 ft 11 in)
- Position: Central midfielder

Team information
- Current team: Leeds United
- Number: 22

Youth career
- 2001–2006: Saginuma SC
- 2007–2016: Kawasaki Frontale

Senior career*
Years	Team	Apps	(Gls)
2017–2022	Kawasaki Frontale	79	(8)
2021–2022	→ Fortuna Düsseldorf (loan)	29	(1)
2022–2024	Fortuna Düsseldorf	55	(8)
2024–	Leeds United	80	(7)

International career^{‡}
2019–2021	Japan U23	18	(2)
2019–	Japan	46	(8)
- * Club domestic league appearances and goals as of 15:03, 7 November 2026 (UTC) ‡ National team caps and goals as of 14 November 2026

Ao Tanaka (田中 碧, Tanaka Ao; born 10 September 1998) is a Japanese professional footballer who plays as a midfielder for Premier League club Leeds United and the Japan national team.

== Early life ==
Ao Tanaka was born in the Miyamae-ku ward of Kawasaki on 10 September 1998. His parents originally wanted to give him a different name, but the sky was so blue on the day of his birth that they named him Ao, the Japanese word for "blue". He started playing football in kindergarten, and in addition to football, he was involved in other athletic pursuits such as gymnastics. However, football was the one he enjoyed the most, and he started kicking the ball against the wall alone in the park for practise.

Tanaka entered Saginuma Elementary School and joined its football club, Saginuma SC, which was well known in the area. The team's coach at the time later recalled Tanaka's trial session; Tanaka was kicking the ball happily at first, but was crying in the corner of the schoolyard halfway through. When the coach asked him why he was crying, he replied, "I'm bored with this practice. I want to practice harder." The coach was surprised to see such ambition in such a young boy.

== Club career ==
=== Kawasaki Frontale ===
Raised for a decade in the youth ranks of hometown club Kawasaki Frontale, Tanaka made his J1 League debut in September 2018 against Consadole Sapporo, scoring his first professional goal just six minutes after he was subbed on. As injuries struck the midfield options of Kawasaki Frontale during the 2019 season, he earned more starts with his club, participating in 24 J1 League matches throughout the season, accumulating 31 matches in total during the year, across five different competitions. As his performances continuously caught the eyes of many, and his manager's approval, he was then awarded the 2019 J.League Rookie of the Year Award in his first full professional season. With this feat, he is the only Kawasaki Frontale player ever to win this award.

=== Fortuna Düsseldorf ===
On 26 June 2021, after two and a half professional seasons with Kawasaki Frontale, he joined German 2. Bundesliga side Fortuna Düsseldorf on a year-long loan with an option to buy.

On 28 April 2022, Fortuna Düsseldorf, satisfied with his club and national team performances, exercised the buy-out option in his club contract to acquire him, paying his release clause to get him officially signed for the club on 28 April 2022. He signed a three-year contract with the expiration date being 30 June 2025, encouraged by a sequence of game time with their first-team in the 2021–22 2. Bundesliga.

=== Leeds United ===
On 30 August 2024, Tanaka signed for EFL Championship club Leeds United on a four-year deal. By November 2024 he had become a key player for the team, being described as "undroppable". He scored his first goal for The Whites in a 3–3 league tie on 4 January 2025 at Hull. That goal against The Tigers was voted 2024–25 Leeds United Goal of the Season.

On 3 May 2025, Tanaka won the 2024–25 EFL Championship title following a 2–1 win over Plymouth Argyle at Home Park. Tanaka scored five league goals during the 2024–25 Leeds United season, which was joint-eighth (with Pascal Struijk) on the squad, and he played a big part in Leeds getting promoted back to the Premier League since relegation in May 2023. He was also voted Leeds United Players' Player of the Year for the 2024–25 season by his teammates. Tanaka was also named to the 2024–25 EFL Championship Team of the Season, along with his teammates Dan James and Jayden Bogle.

Tanaka made his Premier League debut on 18 August 2025, starting in midfield as Leeds United beat Everton 1–0 in their opening game of the 2025–26 season. On 3 December 2025, Tanaka scored a long range strike beating Chelsea goalkeeper Robert Sanchez; Leeds went on to win 3–1. Tanaka scored a second goal in as many games on 6 December 2025 from a corner in the sixth minute of second-half stoppage time to equalize for Leeds United in a 3–3 draw with Liverpool.

== International career ==
Tanaka made his debut for the Japan national football team on 14 December 2019, in a 5–0 win against Hong Kong in the 2019 EAFF E-1 Football Championship. In the summer of 2021, he was named in the 22-man squad for the 2020 Olympic Games alongside two Kawasaki Frontale ex-teammates, Kaoru Mitoma, and Reo Hatate. He started every match for Japan during the tournament.

Throughout the 2020 season, Tanaka established for a good reputation among the Kawasaki Frontale players, playing a total of more than 2500 minutes across all competitions, being a starter in most of the matches he played. His performances with the Kawasaki Frontale team also helped him earn caps with the Japan under-23 team, including a two-goal performance that helped the Japan under-23s earn a 3–2 win over the Brazil under-23 team in a friendly match at 14 October 2019.

He played his first match in the AFC qualification tournament for the 2022 FIFA World Cup on 12 October 2021, where he scored his first international goal in a 2–1 home win against Australia. On 1 November 2022, Tanaka was included in Japan's 26-man squad for the 2022 FIFA World Cup.

On 1 December, he scored the winning goal in a 2–1 victory over Spain, which qualified his national team to the knockout stage as top of their group. That goal sparked much dispute over its validity since the ball seemed to be out-of-play when Kaoru Mitoma assisted Tanaka. The dispute was only settled after the match when the Associated Press released a crucial evidence, the bird's eye photo of the ball, taken by Petr David Josek. Josek revealed that a total of four agencies — AP, Reuters, AFP and Getty Images — were approved to enter the suspended catwalk to take bird's eye photos, but the latter three missed the shot because they were at the opposite side of the pitch anticipating a Spanish goal instead.

On 15 May 2026, Tanaka was selected in the 26-man squad for the 2026 FIFA World Cup.

== Personal life ==
Since childhood, Tanaka has been a close friend of fellow footballer and occasional teammate of Kaoru Mitoma, with whom he attended school.

As of December 2022, Tanaka is in a relationship with singer Airi Suzuki.

In December 2022, Tanaka's outspoken love for Nambu Tekki ironware became a trending topic on social media after he claimed that using a Nambu Tekki kettle had helped him with his anemia.

== Career statistics ==
=== Club ===
As of match played 14 September 2026

Appearances and goals by club, season and competition
Club	Season	League			National cup (Note: Includes Emperor's Cup, DFB-Pokal, FA Cup)		League cup (Note: Includes J. League Cup, EFL Cup)		Continental		Other		Total	
Club	Season	Division	Apps	Goals	Apps	Goals	Apps	Goals	Apps	Goals	Apps	Goals	Apps	Goals
Kawasaki Frontale	2018	J1 League	4	1	0	0	0	0	0	0	–		4	1
Kawasaki Frontale	2019	J1 League	24	1	1	0	1	0	4 (Note: Appearances in AFC Champions League)	1	1 (Note: Appearance in Japanese Super Cup)	0	31	2
Kawasaki Frontale	2020	J1 League	31	5	2	1	5	0	—		—		38	6
Kawasaki Frontale	2021	J1 League	20	1	0	0	0	0	—		1	0	21	1
Kawasaki Frontale	Total		79	8	3	1	6	0	4	1	2	0	94	10
Fortuna Düsseldorf (loan)	2021–22	2. Bundesliga	29	1	1	0	—		—		—		30	1
Fortuna Düsseldorf	2022–23	2. Bundesliga	22	1	3	0	—		—		—		25	1
Fortuna Düsseldorf	2023–24	2. Bundesliga	30	7	4	1	—		—		2 (Note: Appearances in 2. Bundesliga promotion play-offs)	0	36	8
Fortuna Düsseldorf	2024–25	2. Bundesliga	3	0	1	0	—		—		—		4	0
Fortuna Düsseldorf	Total		84	9	9	1	—		—		2	0	95	10
Leeds United	2024–25	Championship	43	5	2	0	—		—		—		45	5
Leeds United	2025–26	Premier League	28	2	5	2	0	0	—		—		33	4
Leeds United	2026–27	Premier League	3	1	0	0	1	0	—		—		4	1
Leeds United	Total		74	8	7	2	1	0	—		—		82	10
Career total			237	25	19	4	7	0	4	1	4	0	271	30

=== International ===
As of match played 14 November 2026

Appearances and goals by national team and year
National team	Year	Apps	Goals
Japan	2019	2	0
Japan	2021	3	1
Japan	2022	13	2
Japan	2023	6	3
Japan	2024	6	2
Japan	2025	5	0
Japan	2026	11	0
Total		46	8

Scores and results list Japan's goal tally first.

List of international goals scored by Ao Tanaka
No.	Date	Venue	Opponent	Score	Result	Competition
1.	12 October 2021	Saitama Stadium 2002, Saitama, Japan	Australia	1–0	2–1	2022 FIFA World Cup qualification
2.	2 June 2022	Sapporo Dome, Sapporo, Japan	Paraguay	4–1	4–1	2022 Kirin Challenge Cup
3.	1 December 2022	Khalifa International Stadium, Al Rayyan, Qatar	Spain	2–1	2–1	2022 FIFA World Cup
4.	9 September 2023	Volkswagen Arena, Wolfsburg, Germany	Germany	4–1	4–1	Friendly
5.	13 October 2023	Denka Big Swan Stadium, Niigata, Japan	Canada	1–0	4–1	2023 Mizuho Blue Dream Match
6.	13 October 2023	Denka Big Swan Stadium, Niigata, Japan	Canada	4–0	4–1	2023 Mizuho Blue Dream Match
7.	1 January 2024	Japan National Stadium, Tokyo, Japan	Thailand	1–0	5–0	Friendly
8.	21 March 2024	Japan National Stadium, Tokyo, Japan	North Korea	1–0	1–0	2026 FIFA World Cup qualification

== Honours ==
Kawasaki Frontale

- J1 League: 2017, 2018, 2020
- Emperor's Cup: 2020
- J.League Cup: 2019
- Japanese Super Cup: 2019, 2021

Leeds United

- EFL Championship: 2024–25

Individual

- J.League Rookie of the Year: 2019
- J.League Best XI: 2020
- Maurice Revello Tournament Third Best Player: 2019
- Maurice Revello Tournament Best XI: 2019
- EFL Championship Team of the Season: 2024–25
- Leeds United Players' Player of the Year: 2024–25
- Leeds United Goal of the Season: 2024–25
- PFA Team of the Year: 2024–25 Championship
