= 2023–24 Leeds United F.C. season =

104th season in existence of Leeds United FC

Leeds United
2023–24 season
- Chairman: Paraag Marathe
- Manager: Daniel Farke
- Stadium: Elland Road
- Championship: 3rd
- Play-offs: Runners-up
- FA Cup: Fifth round
- EFL Cup: Second round
- Top goalscorer: League: Crysencio Summerville (19); All: Crysencio Summerville (21)
- Highest home attendance: 36,954 vs Leicester City (23 February 2024, Championship)
- Lowest home attendance: 32,663 vs Queens Park Rangers (4 October 2023, Championship)
- Average home league attendance: 35,984
Home colours	Away colours	Third colours

The 2023–24 season saw Leeds United competing in the Championship (known as the Sky Bet Championship for sponsorship reasons) following relegation the previous season.

== Pre-season and friendlies ==
Leeds United announced pre-season friendlies against Manchester United, Monaco, Nottingham Forest and Heart of Midlothian.

Win Draw Loss Fixtures

12 July 2023 Friendly	Leeds United	0–2	Manchester United	Oslo, Norway
17:00 CEST		Report	Emeran 66'; Hugill 81'	Stadium: Ullevaal Stadion; Attendance: 21,021; Referee: Rohit Saggi

22 July 2023 Friendly	Leeds United	0–2	Monaco	York
16:00 BST		Report	Ben Yedder 60' (pen.); Volland 77'	Stadium: York Community Stadium; Attendance: 8,209; Referee: Bobby Madley

27 July 2023 Friendly	Nottingham Forest	0–2	Leeds United	Burton
19:45 BST		Report	Bamford 66'; Poveda 85'	Stadium: Pirelli Stadium; Attendance: 5,114; Referee: Craig Pawson

30 July 2023 Friendly	Heart of Midlothian	0–1	Leeds United	Edinburgh, Scotland
15:00 BST		Report	Ayling 38'	Stadium: Tynecastle Park; Attendance: 16,641; Referee: David Dickinson

== Competitions ==
=== Overall record ===
Competition	First match	Last match	Starting round	Final position	Record							
Competition	First match	Last match	Starting round	Final position	Pld	W	D	L	GF	GA	GD	Win %
Championship	6 August 2023	4 May 2024	Matchday 1	3rd	46	27	9	10	81	43	+38	58.70
Championship play-offs	16 May 2024	26 May 2024	Semi-finals	Runners-up	3	1	1	1	4	1	+3	33.33
FA Cup	7 January 2024	28 February 2024	Third round	Fifth round	4	2	1	1	10	5	+5	50.00
EFL Cup	9 August 2023	29 August 2023	First round	Second round	2	1	1	0	3	2	+1	50.00
Total					55	31	12	12	98	51	+47	56.36

Source: Soccerway

=== Championship ===
==== League table ====
Pos	Team	Pld	W	D	L	GF	GA	GD	Pts	Promotion, qualification or relegation
1	Leicester City (C, P)	46	31	4	11	89	41	+48	97	Promoted to the Premier League
2	Ipswich Town (P)	46	28	12	6	92	57	+35	96	Promoted to the Premier League
3	Leeds United	46	27	9	10	81	43	+38	90	Qualified for the Championship play-offs
4	Southampton (O, P)	46	26	9	11	87	63	+24	87	Qualified for the Championship play-offs
5	West Bromwich Albion	46	21	12	13	70	47	+23	75	Qualified for the Championship play-offs
6	Norwich City	46	21	10	15	79	64	+15	73	Qualified for the Championship play-offs

Source: EFL official website
Rules for classification: 1) Points; 2) Goal difference; 3) Number of goals scored; 4) Head-to-head results; 5) Wins; 6) Away goals; 7) Penalty points (sec 9.5); 8) Number of 12-point sending off offences; 9) Play-off (only if needed to determine promotion/relegation)
(C) Champions; (O) Play-off winners; (P) Promoted

==== Results summary ====
Overall								Home						Away					
Pld	W	D	L	GF	GA	GD	Pts	W	D	L	GF	GA	GD	W	D	L	GF	GA	GD
46	27	9	10	81	43	+38	90	16	5	2	45	16	+29	11	4	8	36	27	+9

Source: Soccerway

==== Results by round ====
Round	1	2	3	4	5	6	7	8	9	10	11	12	13	14	15	16	17	18	19	20	21	22	23	24	25	26	27	28	29	30	31	32	33	34	35	36	37	38	39	40	41	42	43	44	45	46
Ground	H	A	H	A	H	A	A	H	A	H	H	A	A	H	A	H	A	H	H	A	A	H	H	A	A	H	A	H	H	A	H	A	A	H	A	H	A	H	A	H	A	H	H	A	A	H
Result	D	L	D	W	D	W	D	W	L	W	W	W	L	W	W	W	D	W	W	W	L	D	W	L	L	W	W	W	W	W	W	W	W	W	D	W	W	W	D	W	L	D	L	W	L	L
Position	11	19	19	13	15	10	9	6	9	6	5	3	3	3	3	3	3	3	3	3	3	3	3	4	4	4	4	4	4	3	3	2	2	2	3	3	2	1	2	2	3	3	3	2	3	3

Source: Soccerway
A = Away; H = Home; W = Win; D = Draw; L = Loss

==== Matches ====
6 August 2023 1	Leeds United	2–2	Cardiff City	Leeds
14:30 BST	Cooper 49'; Summerville 90+5'	Report	Bowler 23'; Ugbo 39'	Stadium: Elland Road; Attendance: 36,368; Referee: Josh Smith

12 August 2023 2	Birmingham City	1–0	Leeds United	Birmingham
15:00 BST	Jutkiewicz 90+1' (pen.)	Report		Stadium: St Andrew's Stadium; Attendance: 20,451; Referee: Tim Robinson

18 August 2023 3	Leeds United	1–1	West Bromwich Albion	Leeds
20:00 BST	Ayling 72'	Report	Thomas-Asante 52'	Stadium: Elland Road; Attendance: 33,890; Referee: Matt Donohue

26 August 2023 4	Ipswich Town	3–4	Leeds United	Ipswich
15:00 BST	Rodon 7' (o.g.); Broadhead 45+7'; Chaplin 90+7'	Report	Rutter 10'; Gnonto 14'; Piroe 19'; Sinisterra 75'	Stadium: Portman Road; Attendance: 29,606; Referee: Bobby Madley

2 September 2023 5	Leeds United	0–0	Sheffield Wednesday	Leeds
15:00 BST		Report		Stadium: Elland Road; Attendance: 36,484; Referee: Dean Whitestone

17 September 2023 6	Millwall	0–3	Leeds United	Bermondsey
12:00 BST		Report	Piroe 15', 77'; Rutter 81'	Stadium: The Den; Attendance: 17,909; Referee: Chris Kavanagh

20 September 2023 7	Hull City	0–0	Leeds United	Hull
19:45 BST		Report		Stadium: MKM Stadium; Attendance: 24,221; Referee: Stephen Martin

23 September 2023 8	Leeds United	3–0	Watford	Leeds
15:00 BST	Piroe 67'; Byram 70'; Anthony 89'	Report		Stadium: Elland Road; Attendance: 36,236; Referee: Jeremy Simpson

30 September 2023 9	Southampton	3–1	Leeds United	Southampton
12:30 BST	A. Armstrong 2', 35'; Smallbone 31'	Report	Struijk 59'	Stadium: St Mary's Stadium; Attendance: 30,372; Referee: John Brooks

4 October 2023 10	Leeds United	1–0	Queens Park Rangers	Leeds
19:45 BST	Summerville 9'	Report		Stadium: Elland Road; Attendance: 32,663; Referee: David Webb

7 October 2023 11	Leeds United	2–1	Bristol City	Leeds
15:00 BST	James 37'; Piroe 53'	Report	Naismith 45+4'	Stadium: Elland Road; Attendance: 36,386; Referee: Keith Stroud

21 October 2023 12	Norwich City	2–3	Leeds United	Norwich
15:00 BST	Duffy 4'; Sara 43'	Report	Summerville 77', 85'; Duffy 63' (o.g.)	Stadium: Carrow Road; Attendance: 26,758; Referee: Jon Busby

25 October 2023 13	Stoke City	1–0	Leeds United	Stoke
20:00 BST	Struijk 80' (o.g.)	Report		Stadium: Bet365 Stadium; Attendance: 25,871; Referee: Paul Tierney

28 October 2023 14	Leeds United	4–1	Huddersfield Town	Leeds
12:30 BST	James 20', 34'; Summerville 31', 45+4'	Report	Helik 70'	Stadium: Elland Road; Attendance: 36,813; Referee: James Bell

3 November 2023 15	Leicester City	0–1	Leeds United	Leicester
20:00 GMT		Report	Rutter 58'	Stadium: King Power Stadium; Attendance: 32,011; Referee: Dean Whitestone

11 November 2023 16	Leeds United	2–1	Plymouth Argyle	Leeds
15:00 GMT	James 21'; Piroe 28'	Report	Waine 84'	Stadium: Elland Road; Attendance: 36,718; Referee: Josh Smith

24 November 2023 17	Rotherham United	1–1	Leeds United	Rotherham
20:00 GMT	Odoffin 45+1'	Report	Summerville 6'	Stadium: New York Stadium; Attendance: 11,471; Referee: Oliver Langford

29 November 2023 18	Leeds United	3–1	Swansea City	Leeds
19:45 GMT	Piroe 4'; Rutter 45+3'; James 61'	Report	Paterson 1'	Stadium: Elland Road; Attendance: 34,905; Referee: Sam Allison

2 December 2023 19	Leeds United	3–2	Middlesbrough	Leeds
15:00 GMT	James 5'; Summerville 7'; Piroe 38' (pen.)	Report	Latte Lath 3', 45'	Stadium: Elland Road; Attendance: 36,812; Referee: Darren England

9 December 2023 20	Blackburn Rovers	0–2	Leeds United	Blackburn
12:30 GMT		Report	James 27'; Summerville 75'	Stadium: Ewood Park; Attendance: 20,963; Referee: Bobby Madley

12 December 2023 21	Sunderland	1–0	Leeds United	Sunderland
20:00 GMT	Bellingham 78'	Report		Stadium: Stadium of Light; Attendance: 40,531; Referee: Dean Whitestone

16 December 2023 22	Leeds United	1–1	Coventry City	Leeds
15:00 GMT	Summerville 58'	Report	Thomas 66'	Stadium: Elland Road; Attendance: 36,700; Referee: Geoff Eltringham

23 December 2023 23	Leeds United	4–0	Ipswich Town	Leeds
12:30 GMT	Struijk 8'; Davis 25' (o.g.); Summerville 45' (pen.); Piroe 52'	Report		Stadium: Elland Road; Attendance: 36,758; Referee: Stephen Martin

26 December 2023 24	Preston North End	2–1	Leeds United	Preston
12:30 GMT	Browne 57'; Millar 89'	Report	Struijk 83' (pen.)	Stadium: Deepdale; Attendance: 21,816; Referee: Josh Smith

29 December 2023 25	West Bromwich Albion	1–0	Leeds United	West Bromwich
20:15 GMT	Diangana 37'	Report		Stadium: Hawthorns; Attendance: 25,409; Referee: Graham Scott

1 January 2024 26	Leeds United	3–0	Birmingham City	Leeds
15:00 GMT	Bamford 34'; James 46'; Summerville 67'	Report		Stadium: Elland Road; Attendance: 36,086; Referee: Keith Stroud

13 January 2024 27	Cardiff City	0–3	Leeds United	Cardiff
15:00 GMT		Report	Bamford 13'; James 31'; Rutter 88'	Stadium: Cardiff City Stadium; Attendance: 25,991; Referee: Oliver Langford

21 January 2024 28	Leeds United	2–1	Preston North End	Leeds
12:00 GMT	James 6'; Piroe 90+4' (pen.)	Report	Keane 2'	Stadium: Elland Road; Attendance: 36,570; Referee: David Webb

24 January 2024 29	Leeds United	1–0	Norwich City	Leeds
19:45 GMT	Bamford 16'	Report		Stadium: Elland Road; Attendance: 34,380; Referee: Matt Donohue

2 February 2024 30	Bristol City	0–1	Leeds United	Bristol
20:00 GMT		Report	Gnonto 48'	Stadium: Ashton Gate; Attendance: 25,429; Referee: Stephen Martin

10 February 2024 31	Leeds United	3–0	Rotherham United	Leeds
15:00 GMT	Bamford 10'; Summerville 52', 60' (pen.)	Report		Stadium: Elland Road; Attendance: 35,261; Referee: Andrew Madley

13 February 2024 32	Swansea City	0–4	Leeds United	Swansea
19:45 GMT		Report	Summerville 8'; Piroe 10'; Gnonto 35', 72'	Stadium: Swansea.com Stadium; Attendance: 17,897; Referee: David Webb

17 February 2024 33	Plymouth Argyle	0–2	Leeds United	Plymouth
12:30 GMT		Report	Gnonto 10'; Rutter 72'	Stadium: Home Park; Attendance: 16,818; Referee: Matthew Donohue

23 February 2024 34	Leeds United	3–1	Leicester City	Leeds
20:00 GMT	Roberts 80'; Faes 83' (o.g.); Bamford 90+4'	Report	Faes 15'	Stadium: Elland Road; Attendance: 36,954; Referee: Craig Pawson

2 March 2024 35	Huddersfield Town	1–1	Leeds United	Huddersfield
12:30 GMT	Helik 45+1'	Report	Bamford 67'	Stadium: Kirklees Stadium; Attendance: 22,351; Referee: Andrew Kitchen

5 March 2024 36	Leeds United	1–0	Stoke City	Leeds
19:45 GMT	James 33'	Report		Stadium: Elland Road; Attendance: 36,118; Referee: Oliver Langford

8 March 2024 37	Sheffield Wednesday	0–2	Leeds United	Sheffield
20:00 GMT		Report	Bamford 45+5'; Gnonto 58'	Stadium: Hillsborough Stadium; Attendance: 30,032; Referee: Sam Allison

17 March 2024 38	Leeds United	2–0	Millwall	Leeds
15:00 GMT	Gnonto 33'; James 79'	Report		Stadium: Elland Road; Attendance: 34,813; Referee: Stephen Martin

29 March 2024 39	Watford	2–2	Leeds United	Watford
20:00 GMT	Bayo 31'; Dennis 44'	Report	Summerville 37'; Joseph 85'	Stadium: Vicarage Road; Attendance: 20,236; Referee: David Webb

1 April 2024 40	Leeds United	3–1	Hull City	Leeds
20:00 BST	Byram 9'; Summerville 88' (pen.); James 90+7'	Report	Carvalho 34'	Stadium: Elland Road; Attendance: 36,747; Referee: Josh Smith

6 April 2024 41	Coventry City	2–1	Leeds United	Coventry
15:00 BST	Simms 9'; Wright 49'	Report	Piroe 76'	Stadium: Coventry Building Society Arena; Attendance: 30,232; Referee: Tom Nield

9 April 2024 42	Leeds United	0–0	Sunderland	Leeds
20:00 BST		Report		Stadium: Elland Road; Attendance: 36,793; Referee: Tim Robinson

13 April 2024 43	Leeds United	0–1	Blackburn Rovers	Leeds
12:30 BST		Report	Szmodics 82'	Stadium: Elland Road; Attendance: 36,518; Referee: James Bell

22 April 2024 44	Middlesbrough	3–4	Leeds United	Middlesbrough
20:00 BST	Jones 7'; Latte Lath 30', 87'	Report	Summerville 14' (pen.), 61'; Bamford 18'; Gnonto 39'	Stadium: Riverside Stadium; Attendance: 29,333; Referee: Tony Harrington

26 April 2024 45	Queens Park Rangers	4–0	Leeds United	Shepherd's Bush
20:00 BST	Chair 8'; Andersen 22'; Dykes 73'; Field 86'	Report		Stadium: Loftus Road; Attendance: 16,677; Referee: Darren Bond

4 May 2024 46	Leeds United	1–2	Southampton	Leeds
12:30 BST	Piroe 21'	Report	A. Armstrong 18'; Smallbone 35'	Stadium: Elland Road; Attendance: 36,766; Referee: Matt Donohue

==== Play-offs ====
12 May 2024 Semi-finals; First leg	Norwich City	0–0	Leeds United	Norwich
12:30 BST		Report		Stadium: Carrow Road; Attendance: 26,982; Referee: Josh Smith

16 May 2024 Semi-finals; Second leg	Leeds United	4–0 (4–0 agg.)	Norwich City	Leeds
20:00 BST	Gruev 7'; Piroe 20'; Rutter 40'; Summerville 68'	Report		Stadium: Elland Road; Attendance: 36,384; Referee: Jarred Gillett

26 May 2024 Final	Leeds United	0–1	Southampton	London
15:00 BST		Report	A. Armstrong 24'	Stadium: Wembley Stadium; Attendance: 85,862; Referee: John Brooks

=== FA Cup ===
7 January 2024 Third round	Peterborough United	0–3	Leeds United	Peterborough
14:00 GMT		Report	Ampadu 34', 90'; Bamford 47'	Stadium: Weston Homes Stadium; Attendance: 12,927; Referee: Sam Allison

27 January 2024 Fourth round	Leeds United	1–1	Plymouth Argyle	Leeds
15:00 GMT	Anthony 31'	Report	Randell 73'	Stadium: Elland Road; Attendance: 35,247; Referee: Lewis Smith

6 February 2024 Fourth round replay	Plymouth Argyle	1–4 (a.e.t.)	Leeds United	Plymouth
19:45 GMT	Galloway 78'	Report	Gnonto 66'; Summerville 97'; Rutter 111'; Hardie 117' (o.g.)	Stadium: Home Park; Attendance: 16,636; Referee: Robert Jones

28 February 2024 Fifth round	Chelsea	3–2	Leeds United	Fulham
19:30 GMT	Jackson 15'; Mudryk 37'; Gallagher 90'	Report	Joseph 8', 59'	Stadium: Stamford Bridge; Attendance: 37,892; Referee: David Coote

=== EFL Cup ===
9 August 2023 First round	Leeds United	2–1	Shrewsbury Town	Leeds
19:45 BST	Gelhardt 52'; Struijk 58'	Report	Perry 28'	Stadium: Elland Road; Attendance: 35,129; Referee: Seb Stockbridge

29 August 2023 Second round	Salford City	1–1 (9–8 p)	Leeds United	Salford
19:45 BST	Smith 34'	Report	Struijk 76'	Stadium: Peninsula Stadium; Attendance: 3,147; Referee: Oliver Langford
	Penalties
	Mallan (penalty scored); McAleny (penalty scored); Watson (penalty scored); Dackers (penalty scored); McLennan (penalty missed); Lund (penalty scored); Bolton (penalty scored); Mariappa (penalty scored); Tilt (penalty scored); Ashley (penalty scored)		(penalty scored) Greenwood; (penalty scored) Struijk; (penalty missed) Rutter; (penalty scored) Gnonto; (penalty scored) Sinisterra; (penalty scored) Hjelde; (penalty scored) Cresswell; (penalty scored) Ampadu; (penalty scored) Summerville; (penalty missed) Shackleton

== Statistics ==
No.	Pos.	Name	League		Play-offs		FA Cup		EFL Cup		Total		Discipline	
No.	Pos.	Name	Apps	Goals	Apps	Goals	Apps	Goals	Apps	Goals	Apps	Goals	Yellow card	Red card
1	GK	(France) Illan Meslier	44	0	3	0	3	0	0	0	50	0	3	1
2	DF	(England) Luke Ayling	8+6	1	0	0	0+1	0	1	0	9+7	1	2	0
3	DF	(Dominican Republic) Junior Firpo	19+7	0	3	0	3+1	0	0	0	25+8	0	7	0
4	MF	(Wales) Ethan Ampadu	46	0	3	0	3	2	2	0	54	2	11	0
5	DF	(England) Charlie Cresswell	1+4	0	0	0	0	0	2	0	3+4	0	0	0
6	DF	(Scotland) Liam Cooper	8+7	1	0+1	0	3	0	0	0	11+8	0	0	0
7	FW	(Netherlands) Joël Piroe	28+14	13	2+1	1	4	0	0	0	34+15	14	2	0
8	MF	(Finland) Glen Kamara	33+4	0	3	0	1+1	0	0	0	37+5	0	3	0
9	FW	(England) Patrick Bamford	15+18	8	0	0	1+2	1	0	0	16+20	9	2	0
10	FW	(Netherlands) Crysencio Summerville	41+2	19	3	1	0+2	1	1	0	45+4	21	8	0
12	MF	(England) Jaidon Anthony	2+29	1	0+3	0	4	1	0	0	6+32	2	1	0
13	GK	(Norway) Kristoffer Klaesson	1	0	0	0	1	0	0	0	2	0	0	0
14	DF	(Wales) Joe Rodon	42+1	0	3	0	4	0	0	0	49+1	0	6	1
16	FW	(England) Sonny Perkins	0+1	0	0	0	0	0	0	0	0+1	0	0	0
17	DF	(England) Jamie Shackleton	7+4	0	0	0	2	0	2	0	11+4	0	2	0
18	MF	(England) Darko Gyabi	0+1	0	0	0	0	0	1	0	0+1	0	0	0
19	MF	(England) Sam Greenwood	0+1	0	0	0	0	0	0+1	0	0+2	0	0	0
20	MF	(Wales) Daniel James	28+12	13	0+3	0	1+1	0	1	0	29+16	13	4	0
21	DF	(Netherlands) Pascal Struijk	22+1	3	0	0	0	0	1+1	2	23+2	5	1	0
22	MF	(England) Archie Gray	40+4	0	3	0	2+1	0	2	0	47+5	0	2	0
23	FW	(Colombia) Luis Sinisterra	2	1	0	0	0	0	0+2	0	2+2	1	0	0
24	FW	(France) Georginio Rutter	44+1	6	3	1	1+1	1	1	0	49+2	8	7	0
25	DF	(England) Sam Byram	24+9	2	1	0	2	0	0+1	0	27+10	2	3	0
26	MF	(England) Lewis Bate	0	0	0	0	0	0	0+1	0	0+1	0	0	0
27	FW	(Colombia) Ian Poveda	1+6	0	0	0	0+2	0	1	0	2+8	0	0	0
28	GK	(England) Karl Darlow	1+1	0	0	0	0	0	2	0	3+1	0	1	0
29	FW	(Italy) Wilfried Gnonto	19+17	8	3	0	3+1	1	1	0	26+18	9	7	0
30	FW	(England) Joe Gelhardt	2+8	0	0	0+1	0	2	1	0	4+9	1	1	0
33	DF	(Norway) Leo Hjelde	1	0	0	0	0	0	2	0	3	0	0	0
33	DF	(Wales) Connor Roberts	2+10	1	0+2	0	1	0	0	0	3+12	1	0	0
37	DF	(England) Cody Drameh	0+1	0	0	0	0	0	0+1	0	0+2	0	0	0
39	DF	(England) Djed Spence	5+2	0	0	0	0	0	0	0	5+2	0	0	0
44	MF	(Bulgaria) Ilia Gruev	20+9	0	3	1	3	0	0	0	26+9	1	8	0
49	FW	(Spain) Mateo Joseph	0+20	1	0+2	0	2+2	2	0	0	2+24	3	0	0

== Transfers ==
=== In ===
Date	Pos.	Name	From	Fee	Ref.
13 July 2023	MF	(Scotland) Josh McDonald	(Scotland) Hamilton Academical	Undisclosed	
13 July 2023	FW	(Scotland) Lewis Pirie	(Scotland) Aberdeen	Undisclosed	
19 July 2023	MF	(Wales) Ethan Ampadu	(England) Chelsea	£7,000,000	
29 July 2023	GK	(England) Karl Darlow	(England) Newcastle United	Undisclosed	
5 August 2023	DF	(England) Sam Byram	(England) Norwich City	Free	
25 August 2023	FW	(Netherlands) Joël Piroe	(Wales) Swansea City	£10,000,000	
31 August 2023	MF	(Bulgaria) Ilia Gruev	(Germany) Werder Bremen	Undisclosed	
31 August 2023	MF	(Finland) Glen Kamara	(Scotland) Rangers	Undisclosed	

=== Out ===
Date	Pos.	Name	To	Fee	Ref.
21 June 2023	FW	(Wales) Tyler Roberts	(England) Birmingham City	Undisclosed	
27 June 2023	MF	(Northern Ireland) Alfie McCalmont	(England) Carlisle United	Undisclosed	
30 June 2023	FW	(Scotland) Ben Andreucci	Unattached	Released	
30 June 2023	GK	(England) Will Brook	Unattached	Released	
30 June 2023	MF	(England) Jay Buchan	Unattached	Released	
30 June 2023	MF	(England) Adam Forshaw	Unattached	Released	
30 June 2023	MF	(Scotland) Stuart McKinstry	Unattached	Released	
30 June 2023	GK	(Spain) Joel Robles	Unattached	Released	
13 July 2023	FW	(Spain) Rodrigo	(Qatar) Al-Rayyan	£3,000,000	
25 July 2023	MF	(England) Owen Bray	(England) Barrow	Free	
20 August 2023	MF	(United States) Tyler Adams	(England) Bournemouth	£23,000,000	
6 October 2023	FW	(Angola) Hélder Costa	Unattached	Released	
30 January 2024	DF	(Norway) Leo Hjelde	(England) Sunderland	Undisclosed	
31 January 2024	MF	(England) Jack Jenkins	(England) Halifax Town	Free	
1 February 2024	FW	(England) Sean McGurk	(England) Swindon Town	Free	
9 February 2024	FW	(Colombia) Luis Sinisterra	(England) Bournemouth	£20,000,000	
10 April 2024	DF	(Northern Ireland) Stuart Dallas	Retired		

=== Loan in ===
Date from	Date to	Pos.	Name	From	Ref.
10 August 2023	30 June 2024	DF	(Wales) Joe Rodon	(England) Tottenham Hopspur	
30 August 2023	4 January 2024	DF	(England) Djed Spence	(England) Tottenham Hopspur	
1 September 2023	30 June 2024	FW	(England) Jaidon Anthony	(England) Bournemouth	
1 February 2024	30 June 2024	DF	(Wales) Connor Roberts	(England) Burnley	

=== Loan out ===
Date from	Date to	Pos.	Name	To	Ref.
6 July 2023	30 June 2024	DF	(Germany) Robin Koch	(Germany) Eintracht Frankfurt	
8 July 2023	30 June 2024	DF	(Spain) Diego Llorente	(Italy) Roma	
9 July 2023	30 June 2024	MF	(United States) Brenden Aaronson	(Germany) Union Berlin	
14 July 2023	30 June 2024	DF	(Denmark) Rasmus Kristensen	(Italy) Roma	
17 July 2023	30 June 2024	MF	(Spain) Marc Roca	(Spain) Real Betis	
31 July 2023	30 June 2024	DF	(Austria) Maximilian Wöber	(Germany) Borussia Mönchengladbach	
14 August 2023	30 June 2024	MF	(England) Jack Harrison	(England) Everton	
25 August 2023	30 June 2024	FW	(England) Sonny Perkins	(England) Oxford United	
31 August 2023	30 June 2024	MF	(England) Sam Greenwood	(England) Middlesbrough	
1 September 2023	30 June 2024	DF	(England) Cody Drameh	(England) Birmingham City	
1 September 2023	9 February 2024	FW	(Colombia) Luis Sinisterra	(England) Bournemouth	
8 September 2023	31 January 2024	MF	(England) Jack Jenkins	(England) Scunthorpe United	
13 October 2023	13 November 2023	GK	(England) Darryl Ombang	(England) Ossett United	
10 January 2024	30 June 2024	DF	(England) Luke Ayling	(England) Middlesbrough	
11 January 2024	30 June 2024	DF	(England) Darko Gyabi	(England) Plymouth Argyle	
19 January 2024	30 June 2024	MF	(England) Lewis Bate	(England) Milton Keynes Dons	
25 January 2024	30 June 2024	DF	(Scotland) Jeremiah Chilokoa-Mullen	(Scotland) Inverness Caledonian Thistle	
1 February 2024	30 June 2024	FW	(Colombia) Ian Poveda	(England) Sheffield Wednesday	
19 February 2024	30 June 2024	MF	(Northern Ireland) Charlie Allen	(England) York City	
