= Jayden Lienou =

Welsh footballer (born 2008)

Personal information
- Date of birth: 8 April 2008 (age 18)
- Place of birth: Wigan, England
- Height: 1.78 m (5 ft 10 in)
- Position: Defender

Team information
- Current team: Leeds United
- Number: 65

Youth career
- –2023: Everton
- 2023–2025: Manchester City
- 2025–: Leeds United

Senior career*
Years	Team	Apps	(Gls)
2026–	Leeds United	0	(0)

International career^{‡}
2023	Wales U15	4	(0)
2023–2024	Wales U16	7	(2)
2024	Wales U17	1	(0)
2025	Wales U18	1	(0)
2025–	Wales U19	10	(2)
- * Club domestic league appearances and goals as of 31 May 2026 ‡ National team caps and goals as of 31 May 2026

Jayden Lienou (born 8 April 2008) is a professional footballer who plays as a defender for Premier League club Leeds United and the Wales under-19 national team.

== Club career ==
As a youth player, Lienou joined the youth academy of English Premier League side Everton. Following his stint there, he joined the youth academy of fellow English Premier League side Manchester City in 2023. He then joined the youth academy of Leeds United in 2025, on a deal which runs until 2028. In May 2026, he made the match day squad for the first time against Tottenham.

== International career ==
Lienou was born to a Cameroonian father and Welsh mother. He is a Wales youth international. On May 31, 2026, he received his maiden call up to the Wales senior national team.
