= Joël Piroe =

Suriname international footballer (born 1999)

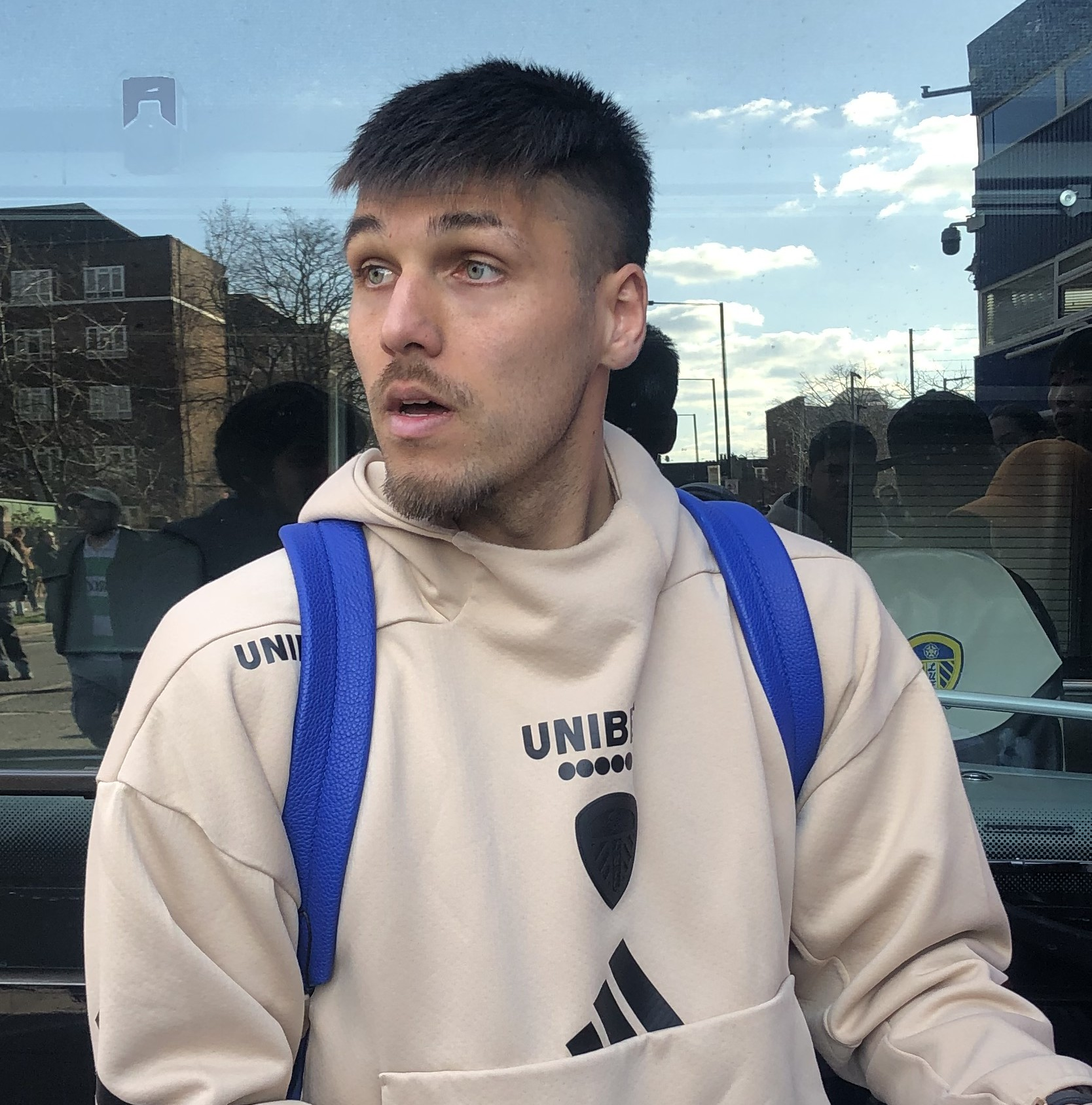
- Piroe with Leeds United in 2025

Personal information
- Full name: Joël Mohammed Ramzan Piroe
- Date of birth: 2 August 1999 (age 27)
- Place of birth: Wijchen, Netherlands
- Height: 1.85 m (6 ft 1 in)
- Position: Forward

Team information
- Current team: West Ham United (on loan from Leeds United)
- Number: 9

Youth career
- SCE Nijmegen
- Quick 1888
- Woezik
- –2013: NEC
- 2013–2014: Feyenoord
- 2014–2019: PSV

Senior career*
Years	Team	Apps	(Gls)
2016–2021	Jong PSV	54	(14)
2019–2021	PSV	11	(1)
2019–2020	→ Sparta Rotterdam (loan)	18	(2)
2021–2023	Swansea City	91	(41)
2023–	Leeds United	104	(32)
2026–	→ West Ham United (loan)	15	(4)

International career^{‡}
2013–2014	Netherlands U15	3	(0)
2015	Netherlands U16	2	(1)
2016	Netherlands U18	4	(0)
2017–2018	Netherlands U19	13	(8)
2018–2019	Netherlands U20	4	(1)
2026–	Suriname	3	(2)
- * Club domestic league appearances and goals as of 21 November 2026 ‡ National team caps and goals as of 26 March 2026

Joël Mohammed Ramzan Piroe (born 2 August 1999) is a professional footballer who plays as a forward for EFL Championship club West Ham United, on loan from Premier League club Leeds United. Born in the Netherlands, he plays for the Suriname national team.

== Club career ==
=== Early career ===
Piroe started playing football at the age of five for SCE Nijmegen and played youth football for Quick 1888 and SC Woezik, after which he was signed to the youth academy of NEC. He first played as a left-back and left midfielder. The coach of the under-12 team of NEC chose to play Piroe as a forward, due to the many goals he scored. He then moved to the youth academy of Feyenoord, and a year later – in 2014 – joined the PSV academy. He signed his first professional contract with the Eindhoven-based club in November 2016.

Piroe made his professional debut in the Eerste Divisie for Jong PSV on 2 December 2016 in a game against Achilles '29.

PSV sent Piroe on a one-year loan to Sparta Rotterdam in August 2019. He made his debut in the Eredivisie on 25 August 2019, coming on for Ragnar Ache in the 60th minute away against PEC Zwolle – a game which ended in a 2–2 draw.

=== Swansea City ===
On 2 July 2021, Piroe moved to Wales to join Swansea City on a three-year deal, joining for an undisclosed fee, reported to be in the region of £1 million with the potential to rise up to £2 million. He scored on his Swansea debut in an EFL Cup tie against Reading on 10 August 2021.

=== Leeds United ===
On 24 August 2023, Leeds United signed Piroe on a four-year deal for an undisclosed fee, believed to be above £10 million. He scored on his Leeds debut against Ipswich on 26 August 2023 in a 4–3 victory.

On 21 April 2025, he netted four goals in a 6–0 victory over Stoke City, securing his team's promotion to the Premier League. On 3 May 2025, Piroe won the 2024–25 Championship title with Leeds following a 2–1 win over Plymouth Argyle at Home Park. He was also awarded the Golden Boot for the same season after scoring a league-high 19 goals with Leeds.

On 8 March 2026, Piroe scored his first goal of the 2025–26 season, in any competition, in a 3–0 FA Cup win against Norwich City at Elland Road.

=== West Ham United ===
On 19 August 2026, Piroe joined EFL Championship club West Ham United on a season-long loan with an obligation to buy. He made his debut on 22 August 2026, scoring in a 1–2 loss in the league to Charlton Athletic.

== International career ==
Piroe represented the Netherlands at youth international level. On 8 January 2026, he switched his international allegiance to Suriname. Later that year, on 26 March, he made his international debut, starting in a 2–1 defeat against Bolivia in the World Cup qualification inter-confederation play-offs.

== Personal life ==
Piroe was born in the Netherlands to an Indo-Surinamese Muslim father and a Dutch mother.

== Career statistics ==
=== Club ===
As of match played 4 November 2026

Appearances and goals by club, season and competition
Club	Season	League			National cup (Note: Includes KNVB Cup, FA Cup)		League cup (Note: Includes EFL Cup)		Europe		Other		Total	
Club	Season	Division	Apps	Goals	Apps	Goals	Apps	Goals	Apps	Goals	Apps	Goals	Apps	Goals
Jong PSV	2016–17	Eerste Divisie	12	2	—		—		—		—		12	2
Jong PSV	2017–18	Eerste Divisie	6	0	—		—		—		—		6	0
Jong PSV	2018–19	Eerste Divisie	29	11	—		—		—		—		29	11
Jong PSV	2019–20	Eerste Divisie	2	1	—		—		—		—		2	1
Jong PSV	2020–21	Eerste Divisie	5	0	—		—		—		—		5	0
Jong PSV	Total		54	14	—		—		—		—		54	14
PSV Eindhoven	2018–19	Eredivisie	0	0	0	0	—		0	0	—		0	0
PSV Eindhoven	2019–20	Eredivisie	0	0	0	0	—		0	0	—		0	0
PSV Eindhoven	2020–21	Eredivisie	11	1	2	0	—		1 (Note: Appearance in UEFA Europa League)	2	—		14	3
PSV Eindhoven	Total		11	1	2	0	—		1	2	—		14	3
Sparta Rotterdam (loan)	2019–20	Eredivisie	18	2	2	0	—		—		—		20	2
Swansea City	2021–22	Championship	45	22	1	1	1	1	—		—		47	24
Swansea City	2022–23	Championship	43	19	2	1	0	0	—		—		45	20
Swansea City	2023–24	Championship	3	0	—		1	2	—		—		4	2
Swansea City	Total		91	41	3	2	2	3	—		—		96	46
Leeds United	2023–24	Championship	42	13	4	0	—		—		3 (Note: Appearances in Championship play-offs)	1	49	14
Leeds United	2024–25	Championship	46	19	1	0	1	0	—		—		48	19
Leeds United	2025–26	Premier League	16	0	4	1	1	0	—		—		21	1
Leeds United	2026–27	Premier League	0	0	0	0	0	0	—		—		0	0
Leeds United	Total		104	32	9	1	2	0	0	0	3	1	118	34
West Ham United (loan)	2026–27	Championship	13	3	0	0	2	0	—		—		15	3
Career total			291	93	16	3	6	3	1	2	3	1	317	102

=== International ===
As of match played 26 March 2026

Appearances and goals by national team and year
National team	Year	Apps	Goals
Suriname	2026	1	0
Total		1	0

== Honours ==
Leeds United

- EFL Championship: 2024–25

Individual

- UEFA European Under-19 Championship Golden Boot: 2017
- Swansea City Player of the Year: 2021–22
- EFL Championship Golden Boot: 2024–25
- PFA Team of the Year: 2024–25 Championship
