= Junior Firpo =

Dominican footballer (born 1996)

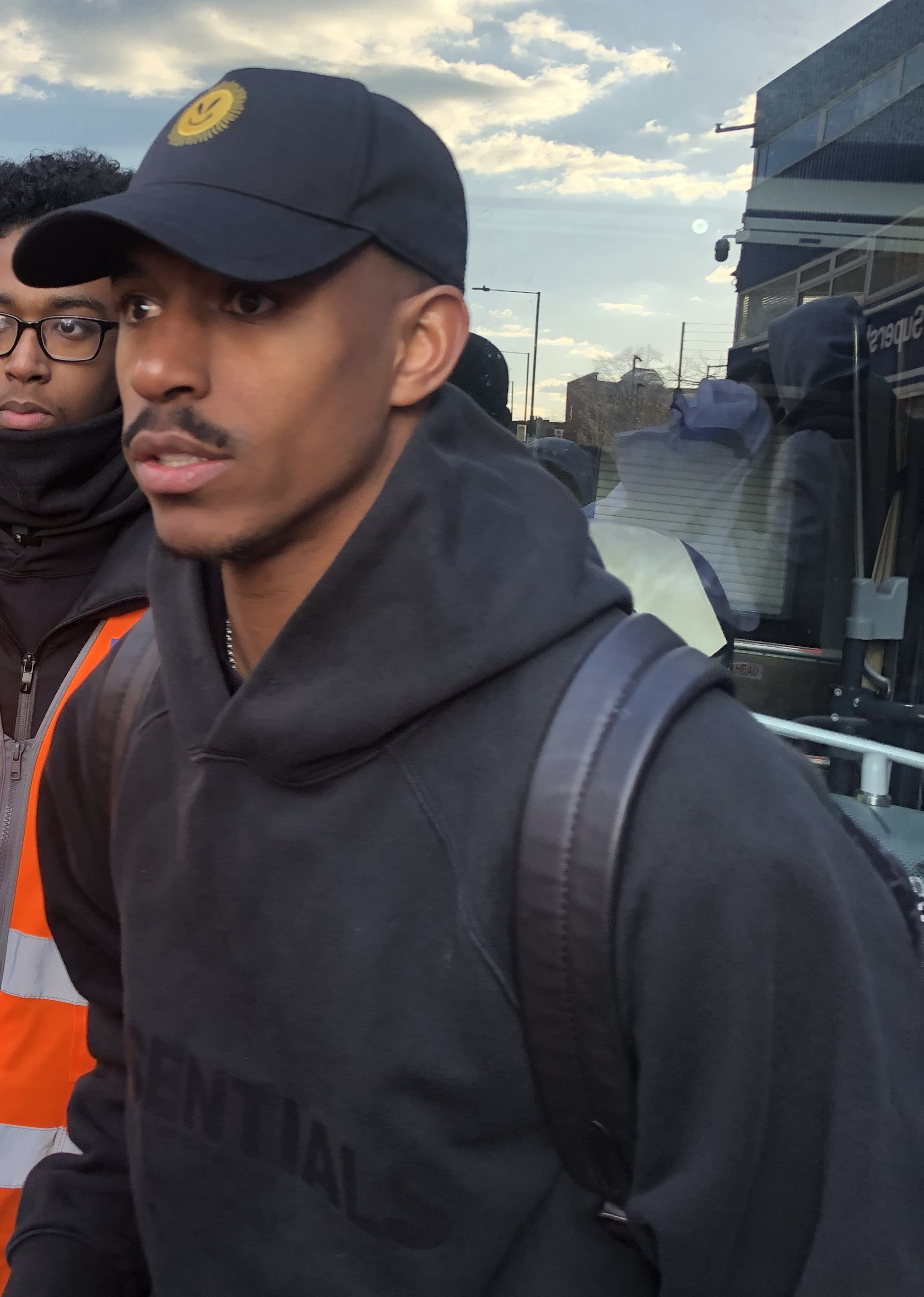
- Firpo in 2025

Personal information
- Full name: Héctor Junior Firpo Adames
- Date of birth: 22 August 1996 (age 30)
- Place of birth: Santo Domingo, Dominican Republic
- Height: 1.84 m (6 ft 0 in)
- Position: Left-back

Team information
- Current team: Betis
- Number: 23

Youth career
- 2011–2012: Atlético Benamiel
- 2012–2013: Tiro Pichón
- 2013–2014: Puerto Malagueño
- 2014–2015: Betis

Senior career*
Years	Team	Apps	(Gls)
2015–2018	Betis B	45	(2)
2018–2019	Betis	38	(5)
2019–2021	Barcelona	24	(2)
2021–2025	Leeds United	101	(5)
2025–	Betis	13	(0)

International career^{‡}
2018–2019	Spain U21	4	(0)
2024–	Dominican Republic	18	(5)
- * Club domestic league appearances and goals as of 23:05, 25 August 2026 (UTC) ‡ National team caps and goals as of 5 October 2026

Héctor Junior Firpo Adames (born 22 August 1996), known as Junior Firpo or Junior mononymously, is a Dominican professional footballer who plays as a left-back for La Liga club Real Betis and the Dominican Republic national team.

== Club career ==
=== Real Betis ===
Firpo was born in Santo Domingo, Dominican Republic. He moved to Benalmádena, Málaga, Andalusia at the age of six and joined Real Betis' youth setup in June 2014, aged 18, from Puerto Malagueño. He made his senior debut with the reserves on 15 February 2015, starting in a 1–1 home draw against Granada B in the Segunda División B.

Promoted to the B-side ahead of the 2015–16 season, Junior appeared regularly during the season, which ended in relegation. On 17 April 2016 he scored his first senior goal, netting the third in a 4–0 away win over Algeciras..

On 1 August 2017, after spending the whole pre-season with the main squad, Junior renewed his contract until 2021. He made his first team – and La Liga – debut the following 12 February, starting in a 1–0 away defeat of Deportivo La Coruña, becoming the first Dominican Republic-born player to have ever featured in La Liga.

Junior scored his first professional goal on 17 March 2018, netting the first in a 3–0 home win against Espanyol. On 19 August, after being promoted to the main squad, he agreed to a contract extension until 2023.

=== Barcelona ===
On 4 August 2019, Junior signed a five-year deal with Barcelona for €18 million plus €12 million in add-ons. He made his debut three weeks later in a 5–2 home win over his former club Betis, playing the last nine minutes in place of Rafinha. On 28 September, Junior scored his first goal for Barcelona and the second goal against Getafe in a 2–0 win. On 27 November, he made his UEFA Champions League debut in a 3–1 group stage victory over Borussia Dortmund.

On 13 February 2021, Firpo scored his second (and last) goal for Barça in a 5–1 home win over Alavés.

=== Leeds United ===
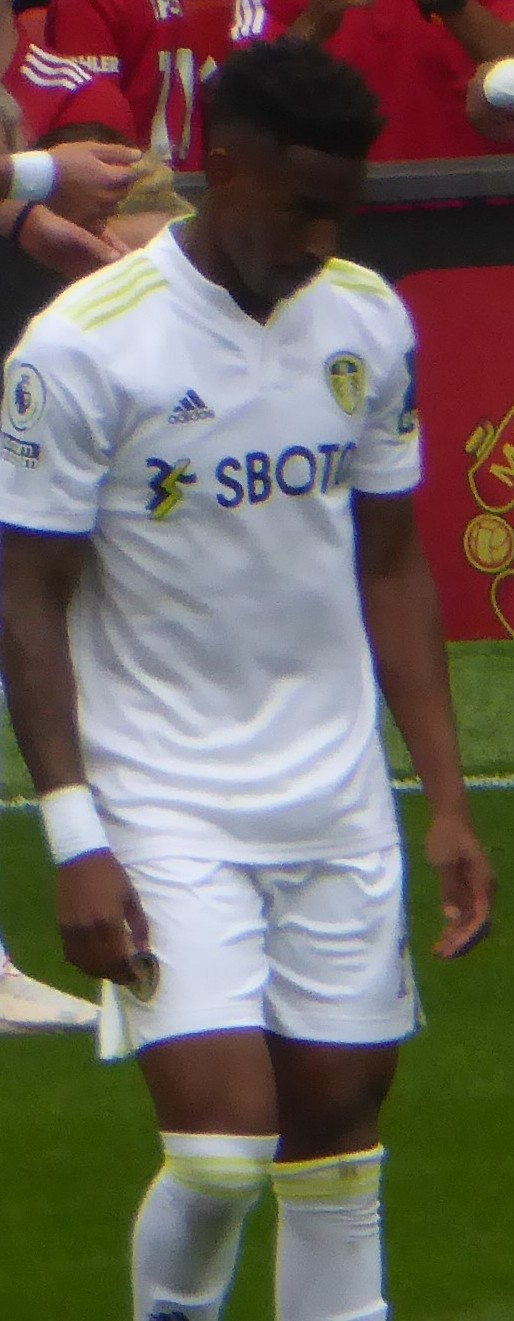
Junior Firpo with Leeds in 2021

On 6 July 2021, Firpo signed a four-year deal with Premier League club Leeds United for a fee of €15 million plus add-ons, with Barcelona reserving rights to 25% of his future sales. This made him the first Dominican player to play in the Premier League. He was expected to replace Ezgjan Alioski at the left back role after Alioski's contract expired, and made his debut for the club in that position on 14 August in the second half of the season opener at Old Trafford, where he came on as a tactical substitute for Rodrigo in a 5–1 loss.

He scored his first goal for the club in Leeds' 3–1 win in the FA Cup fourth round at the Wham Stadium over Accrington Stanley on 28 January 2023. On 25 February 2023, Firpo scored his first Premier League goal, and the first goal of new manager Javi Gracia's reign in a 1–0 win against Southampton at Elland Road.

Firpo did not feature regularly as part of new manager Daniel Farke's back line for the 2023–24 season, making only four appearances in the first five months, only one of these as a starter. However, following Djed Spence's loan termination by Leeds, as well as an injury to Sam Byram, Firpo became the first-choice left-back in the new year, assisting 4 goals in three league games.

Firpo tallied a career-high four goals and 10 assists during the 2024–25 EFL Championship season with Leeds United, which saw the team get promoted back to the Premier League for the first time since 2023, when Firpo was originally relegated with the team.

=== Betis return ===
On 17 July 2025, Firpo agreed his return to Betis on a three-year deal.

== International career ==
Despite being born in the Dominican Republic, he has spent the majority of his life in Spain and continues to hold citizenship for both countries. On 9 October 2015, he played the entire second half of a 6–0 non-FIFA friendly loss for the Dominican Republic national team against the Brazil Olympic team.

On 31 August 2018, Junior was called up to the Spain under-21 team for two 2019 UEFA European Under-21 Championship qualifying matches against Albania and Northern Ireland. He made his debut on 7 September, starting in a 3–0 win against the former.

On 28 February 2024, Junior announced that he would represent the Dominican Republic going forward following talks with the national team's manager.

He made his debut on 23 March 2024 in a friendly against Aruba.

== Career statistics ==
=== Club ===
As of match played 25 August 2026

Appearances and goals by club, season and competition
Club	Season	League			National cup (Note: Includes Copa del Rey, FA Cup)		League cup (Note: Includes EFL Cup)		Europe		Other		Total	
Club	Season	Division	Apps	Goals	Apps	Goals	Apps	Goals	Apps	Goals	Apps	Goals	Apps	Goals
Real Betis B	2014–15	Segunda División B	2	0	0	0	—		—		—		2	0
Real Betis B	2015–16	Segunda División B	30	1	0	0	—		—		—		30	1
Real Betis B	2017–18	Segunda División B	13	1	0	0	—		—		—		13	1
Real Betis B	Total		45	2	0	0	—		—		—		45	2
Real Betis	2017–18	La Liga	14	2	0	0	—		—		—		14	2
Real Betis	2018–19	La Liga	24	3	1	0	—		4 (Note: Appearances in UEFA Europa League)	0	—		29	3
Real Betis	Total		38	5	1	0	—		4	0	—		43	5
Barcelona	2019–20	La Liga	17	1	2	0	—		4 (Note: Appearances in UEFA Champions League)	0	0	0	23	1
Barcelona	2020–21	La Liga	7	1	4	0	—		6	0	1 (Note: Appearance(s) in Supercopa de España)	0	18	1
Barcelona	Total		24	2	6	0	—		10	0	1	0	41	2
Leeds United	2021–22	Premier League	24	0	1	0	2	0	—		—		27	0
Leeds United	2022–23	Premier League	19	1	4	1	1	0	—		—		24	2
Leeds United	2023–24	Championship	29	0	4	0	0	0	—		3 (Note: Appearances in Championship play-offs)	0	36	0
Leeds United	2024–25	Championship	32	4	2	0	1	0	—		—		35	4
Leeds United	Total		104	5	11	1	4	0	—		3	0	122	6
Betis	2025–26	La Liga	12	0	1	0	—		3	0	—		16	0
Betis	2026–27	La Liga	1	0	0	0	0	0	1	0	0	0	2	0
Betis	Total		13	0	1	0	—		4	0	0	0	18	0
Career total			221	13	19	1	4	0	18	0	4	0	266	15

=== International ===
As of match played 29 March 2026

Appearances and goals by national team and year
National team	Year	Apps	Goals	Assists
Dominican Republic	2024	10	3	4
Dominican Republic	2025	3	1	0
Dominican Republic	2026	2	1	0
Total		15	5	4

Dominican Republic's score listed first, score column indicates score after each Firpo goal.

List of international goals scored by Junior Firpo
No.	Date	Venue	Opponent	Score	Result	Competition
1	12 October 2024	Bermuda National Stadium, Devonshire Parish, Bermuda	Antigua and Barbuda	4–0	5–0	2024–25 CONCACAF Nations League B
2	12 October 2024	Bermuda National Stadium, Devonshire Parish, Bermuda	Antigua and Barbuda	5–0	5–0	2024–25 CONCACAF Nations League B
3	15 October 2024	Bermuda National Stadium, Devonshire Parish, Bermuda	Antigua and Barbuda	4–0	5–0	2024–25 CONCACAF Nations League B
4	25 March 2025	Estadio Cibao FC, Santiago de los Caballeros, Dominican Republic	Puerto Rico	2–0	2–0	Friendly
5	26 March 2026	Estadio Cibao FC, Santiago de los Caballeros, Dominican Republic	El Salvador	1–0	2–2	2025–26 CONCACAF Series

== Honours ==
Leeds United

- EFL Championship: 2024–25

Spain U21

- UEFA European Under-21 Championship: 2019

Individual

- PFA Team of the Year: 2024–25 Championship
