= Crysencio Summerville =

Dutch footballer (born 2001)

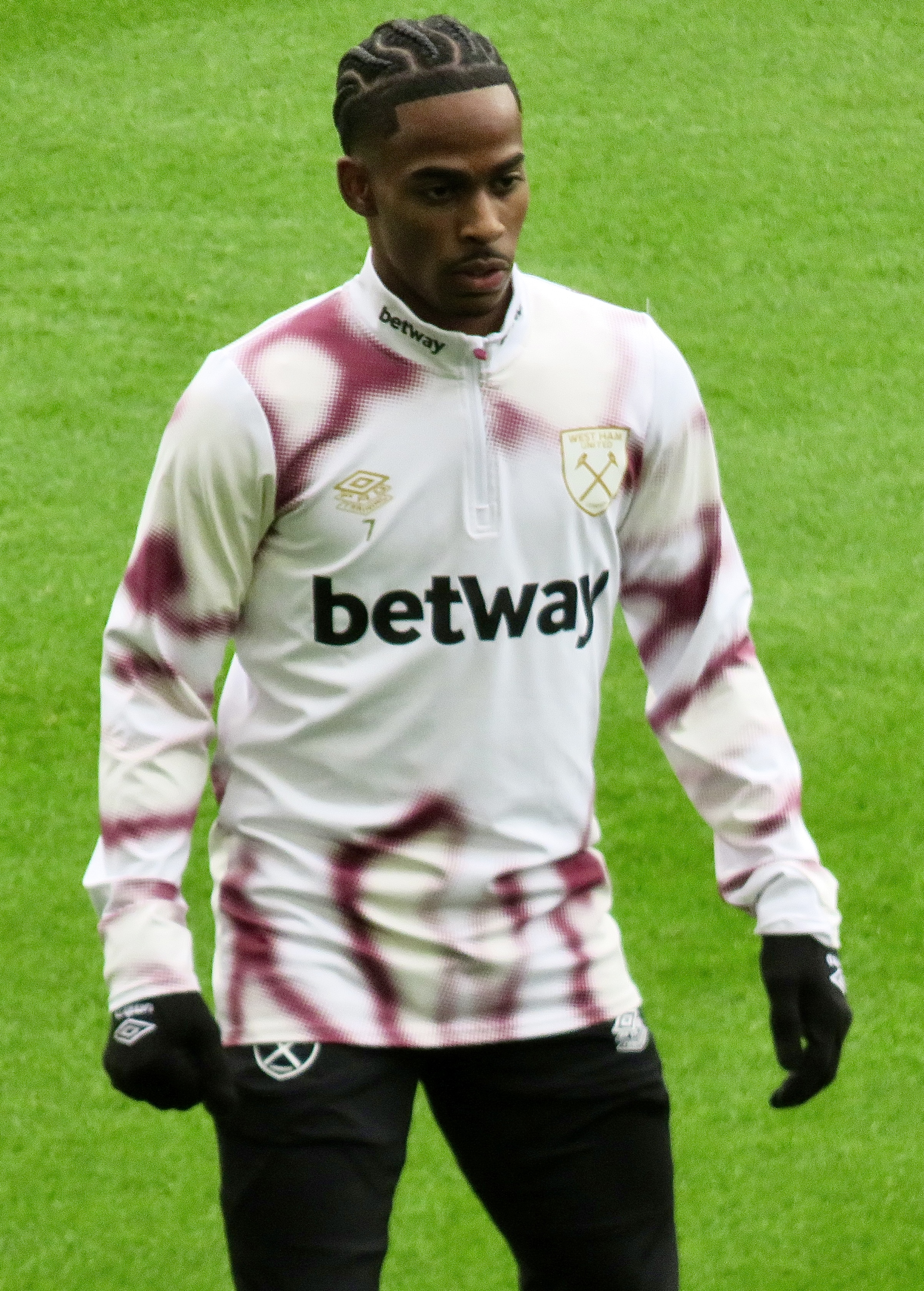
- Summerville warming up with West Ham United in 2024

Personal information
- Full name: Crysencio Jilbert Sylverio Cirro Summerville
- Date of birth: 30 October 2001 (age 25)
- Place of birth: Rotterdam, Netherlands
- Height: 1.72 m (5 ft 8 in)
- Positions: Left winger; attacking midfielder

Team information
- Current team: Al Hilal
- Number: 38

Youth career
- RVVV Noorderkwartier
- 2008–2018: Feyenoord

Senior career*
Years	Team	Apps	(Gls)
2018–2020	Feyenoord	0	(0)
2018–2019	→ FC Dordrecht (loan)	18	(5)
2019–2020	→ ADO Den Haag (loan)	21	(2)
2020–2024	Leeds United	77	(23)
2024–2026	West Ham United	50	(6)
2026–	Al Hilal	11	(3)

International career^{‡}
2016–2017	Netherlands U16	4	(1)
2017–2018	Netherlands U17	16	(1)
2018	Netherlands U18	4	(1)
2019–2021	Netherlands U19	5	(6)
2021–2023	Netherlands U21	8	(3)
2026–	Netherlands	12	(3)
Medal record
Representing Netherlands
UEFA European Under-17 Championship
Winner	England 2018	U-17 Team
- * Club domestic league appearances and goals as of 21:25, 31 October 2026 (UTC) ‡ National team caps and goals as of 22:00, 16 November 2026 (UTC)

Crysencio Jilbert Sylverio Cirro Summerville (born 30 October 2001) is a Dutch professional footballer who plays as a left winger or attacking midfielder for Saudi Pro League club Al Hilal and the Netherlands national team.

== Club career ==
=== Feyenoord ===
Born in Rotterdam to Afro-Surinamese parents, Summerville played youth football at RVVV Noorderkwartier before joining the Feyenoord academy in 2008. In March 2018, he signed his first professional contract with Feyenoord; a contract lasting until the summer of 2021.

On 12 December 2018, he joined FC Dordrecht on loan until the end of the 2018–19 season. He made his Eerste Divisie debut for Dordrecht on 13 January 2019 in a game against Den Bosch, as a 70th-minute substitute for Oussama Zamouri. On 29 January 2019, he made his starting eleven debut for the club, scoring his first goal as a professional footballer in the sixth minute.

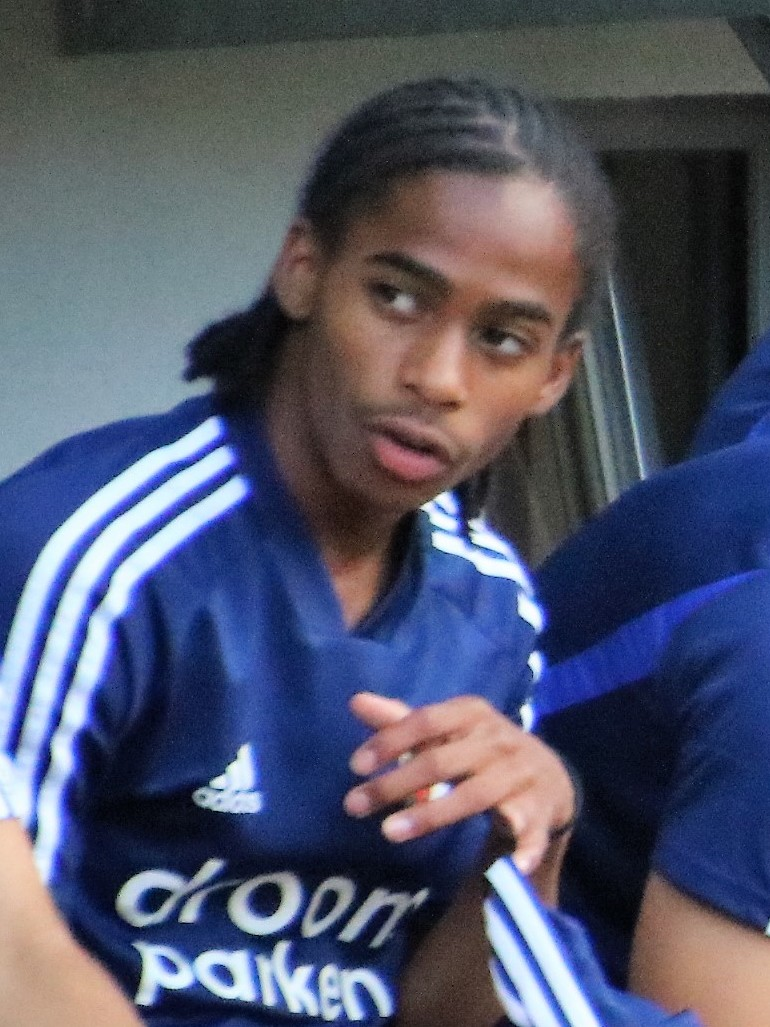
Summerville in 2019 with Feyenoord

In August 2019, he joined fellow Eredivisie side ADO Den Haag on loan. He made his debut for the club on 31 August 2019 in a 1–0 win against VVV. On 26 October 2019, he scored his first Eredivisie goal for ADO Den Haag on 26 October 2019 in a 2–0 win against Vitesse, becoming the youngest goalscorer for the club in the Eredivisie. He impressed for the club during his spell, scoring two goals and gained three assists for the side.

He returned to Feyenoord at the end of his loan spell ahead of the 2020–21 Eredivisie season, with Voetbal International reporting on 17 August 2020 that Summerville had turned down a new extended contract offer at Feyenoord.

=== Leeds United ===
On 16 September 2020, Summerville joined Leeds United for an undisclosed fee, signing a three-year contract.

He made his debut on 17 September 2021 against Newcastle United, in the Premier League, coming on for Raphinha in the 67th minute.

In August 2022, Summerville agreed a new contract at Leeds until 2026.

On 23 October 2022, Summerville scored his first Premier League goal in a 3–2 defeat against Fulham at Elland Road. On 29 October, he scored the winning goal in the 89th minute in a 2–1 victory over Liverpool, making it his club's first win at Anfield since April 2001, simultaneously ending Liverpool's 29-game unbeaten streak at home in the Premier League. On 5 November 2022, he scored another late winning goal to give Leeds a come-from-behind 4–3 win at home against Bournemouth. His goal in Leeds' 4–3 away loss at Tottenham Hotspur on 12 November brought Summerville's league tally to four goals in four consecutive games, as the Premier League went on hiatus for the World Cup. However, he did not find the net again in either the league or the cup for the remainder of the season and found himself often substituted or, when not in the starting XI, coming on usually as a direct second-half replacement for Brenden Aaronson; Leeds United suffered from poor form during this period and were consequently relegated from the Premier League.

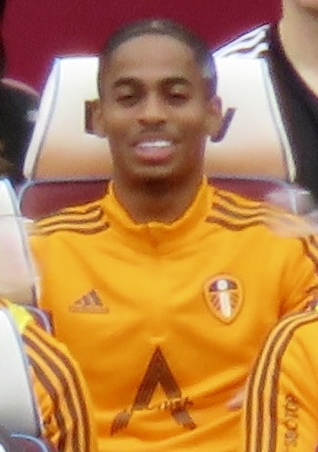
Summerville with Leeds United in 2023

Summerville scored a brace in an eight-minute spell at Carrow Road in a late-in-the-game 3–2 win on 21 October 2023. This was the first time since May 2021 that Leeds had had three victories in a row and moved them up to third in the Championship. He followed this up seven days later with another pair of goals, both scored in the first half, in the team's 4–1 home victory over Huddersfield. Summerville further proved instrumental in the Leeds side, where, after an assist to Piroe in a 2–1 win against Plymouth on 11 November 2023, he would have a goal contribution in five consecutive games. In 2024, Leeds went on a 16-game unbeaten run, in which Summerville played every game, ending in a 2–1 loss to Coventry in April. Afterwards, Leeds went on a string of bad form, achieving only one win in six games, a win at Middlesbrough, where Summerville netted a brace and an assist in a dramatic 3–4 scoreline. Leeds finished third in the campaign, with Summerville named the Championship Player of the Season and a place in the Championship Team of the Season at the 2024 EFL Awards. In the second leg of the Championship play-off semi-final, he scored the fourth goal in a 4–0 hammering at Elland Road to Norwich on 16 May. Following their win, Leeds progressed to the play-off final, where they lost 0–1 to Southampton at Wembley on 25 May, putting an end to hopes of a rebound return to the Premier League. He ended the season with 21 goals and 10 assists in 49 appearances, achieving the status of top scorer for the Whites.

=== West Ham United ===
On 3 August 2024, Summerville joined Premier League club West Ham United for a fee in excess of £25 million. He signed a five-year contract with an option for a sixth year. He made his West Ham debut on 17 August, coming on as a 73rd-minute substitute for Jarrod Bowen in a 2–1 home defeat by Aston Villa. His first goal for West Ham came on 27 October, the first goal in a 2–1 win against Manchester United.

Summerville suffered a hamstring injury that required surgery in an FA Cup tie against Aston Villa on 10 January 2025. He made his return to the first team as a substitute in a 3–0 league defeat of Nottingham Forest at the City Ground on 31 August 2025, being directly involved in the Hammers' first two goals.

=== Al Hilal ===
On 24 July 2026, Summerville moved to Saudi Pro League club Al Hilal on a four-year contract in a deal reportedly worth an initial £55 million (€64.4 million), plus £5 million (€5.9 million) in add-ons. On 14 August 2026, he played his first official match for Al Hilal against Al Faisaly in which Al Hilal won 4–2, On 28 August, he scored his first goal for the club in Al Hilal's 5–1 win against Al-Khaleej FC with an assist from Rúben Neves; he also assisted 2 goals in that game.

On 1 September 2026, Al Hilal won 3–0 against Al-Ahli Saudi FC where Summerville would score in the 23rd minute of the game with an assist from Rúben Neves.

As of 2 September 2026, Summerville played four official matches and in those matches, he scored 2 goals and made 2 assists. He also missed a penalty kick against Al-Fayha and received a yellow card against Al-Ahli Saudi FC.

== International career ==
Born in the Netherlands, Summerville is of Surinamese descent. He won the 2018 UEFA European Under-17 Championship with the Netherlands national under-17 football team, scoring a goal in the group game against Germany and appearing as a substitute in the final against Italy. On 27 May 2026, Ronald Koeman revealed that Summerville was part of the 26-men squad for the World Cup. On 14 June 2026, Summerville netted his first international goal with a left-footed strike in an eventual 2–2 draw against Japan in the Netherlands' first game at the World Cup. In the Netherlands' second match at the World Cup he came on as a substitute, scoring his second international goal as the Dutch team beat Sweden 5–1.

== Career statistics ==
=== Club ===
As of match played 31 October 2026

Appearances and goals by club, season and competition
Club	Season	League			National cup (Note: Includes KNVB Cup, FA Cup, King's Cup)		League cup (Note: Includes EFL Cup)		Continental		Other		Total	
Club	Season	Division	Apps	Goals	Apps	Goals	Apps	Goals	Apps	Goals	Apps	Goals	Apps	Goals
FC Dordrecht (loan)	2018–19	Eerste Divisie	18	5	0	0	—		—		—		18	5
ADO Den Haag (loan)	2019–20	Eredivisie	21	2	1	0	—		—		—		22	2
Leeds United	2020–21	Premier League	0	0	0	0	0	0	—		—		0	0
Leeds United	2021–22	Premier League	6	0	1	0	2	0	—		—		9	0
Leeds United	2022–23	Premier League	28	4	2	0	1	0	—		—		31	4
Leeds United	2023–24	Championship	43	19	2	1	1	0	—		3 (Note: Appearances in Championship play-offs)	1	49	21
Leeds United	Total		77	23	5	1	4	0	—		3	1	89	25
West Ham United	2024–25	Premier League	19	1	1	0	2	0	—		—		22	1
West Ham United	2025–26	Premier League	31	5	3	2	0	0	—		—		34	7
West Ham United	Total		50	6	4	2	2	0	—		0	0	56	8
Al Hilal	2026–27	Saudi Pro League	11	3	1	0	—		1 (Note: Appearance in AFC Champions League Elite)	0	—		13	3
Career total			177	39	11	3	6	0	1	0	3	1	198	43

=== International ===
As of match played 16 November 2026

Appearances and goals by national team and year
National team	Year	Apps	Goals
Netherlands	2026	12	3
Total		12	3

Netherlands score listed first, score column indicates score after each Summerville goal.

List of international goals scored by Crysencio Summerville
No.	Date	Venue	Cap	Opponent	Score	Result	Competition
1	14 June 2026	AT&T Stadium, Arlington, United States	3	Japan	2–1	2–2	2026 FIFA World Cup
2	20 June 2026	NRG Stadium, Houston, United States	4	Sweden	5–1	5–1	2026 FIFA World Cup
3	13 November 2026	Johan Cruyff Arena, Amsterdam, Netherlands	11	Greece	1–0	7–0	2026–27 UEFA Nations League A

== Honours ==
Netherlands U17

- UEFA European Under-17 Championship: 2018

Individual

- EFL Championship Player of the Month: October 2023
- EFL Championship Team of the Season: 2023–24
- EFL Championship Player of the Season: 2023–24
- Leeds United Players' Player of the Season: 2023–24
- PFA Team of the Year: 2023–24 Championship
- PFA Championship Player of the Year: 2023–24
- The Athletic Championship Team of the Season: 2023–24
