= Mateo Joseph =

Spanish footballer (born 2003)

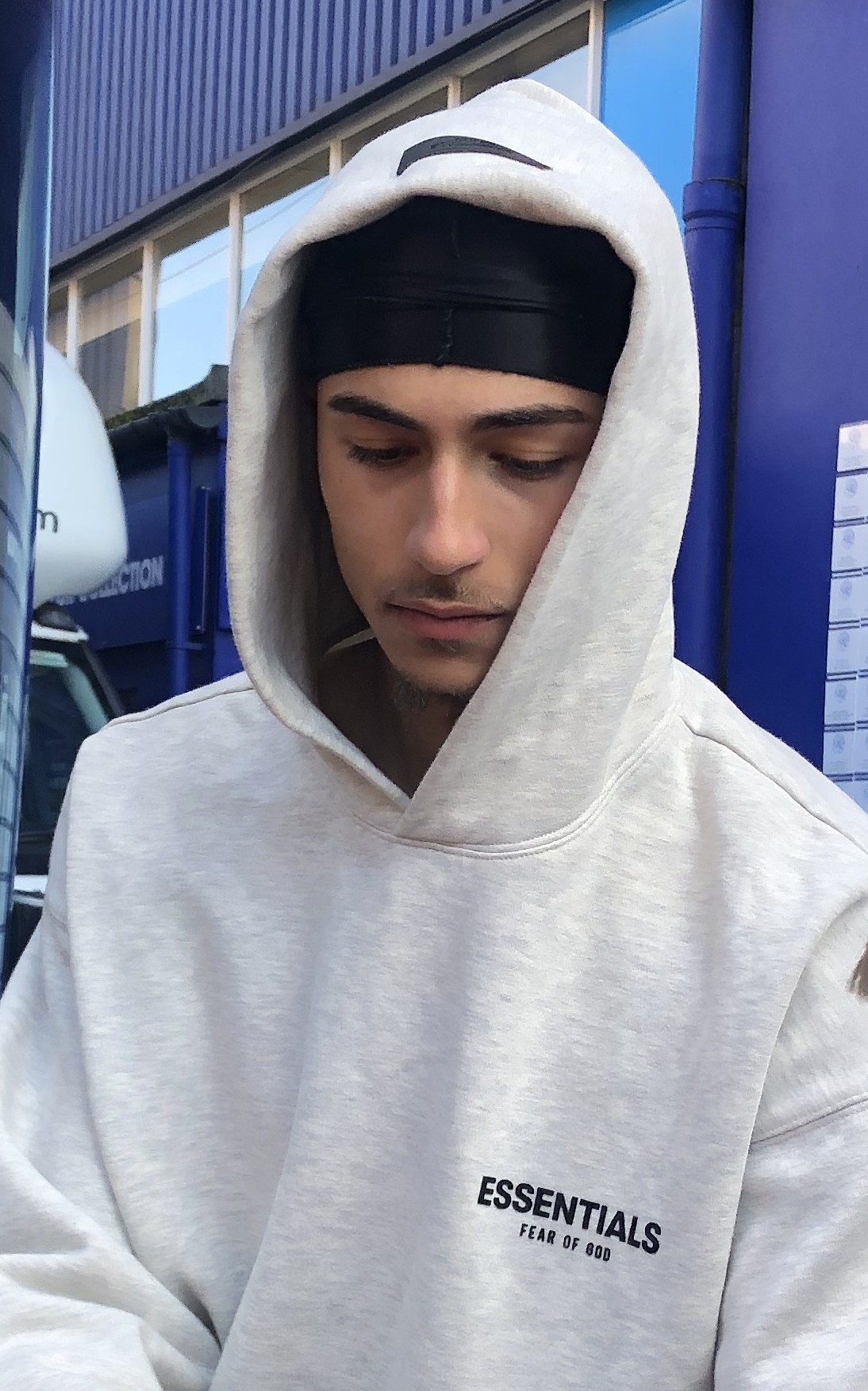
- Joseph in 2025

Personal information
- Full name: Mateo Joseph Fernández-Regatillo
- Date of birth: 19 October 2003 (age 23)
- Place of birth: Santander, Spain
- Height: 1.80 m (5 ft 11 in)
- Position: Forward

Team information
- Current team: Leeds United

Youth career
- 2011–2013: Escobedo
- 2013–2017: Racing Santander
- 2017–2022: Espanyol

Senior career*
Years	Team	Apps	(Gls)
2022–	Leeds United	62	(4)
2025–2026	→ Mallorca (loan)	29	(2)

International career^{‡}
2023–2024	England U20	10	(3)
2024–2025	Spain U21	12	(8)
- * Club domestic league appearances and goals as of 19:12, 4 April 2026 (UTC) ‡ National team caps and goals as of 14:03, 20 June 2025 (UTC)

Mateo Joseph Fernández-Regatillo (born 19 October 2003) is a Spanish professional footballer who plays as a forward for Premier League club Leeds United.

== Club career ==
=== Early career ===
Born in Santander, Joseph grew up in Escobedo de Camargo, and began playing for local side UM Escobedo. He joined the academy of Espanyol in 2017, after a prolific season at Racing Santander.

=== Leeds United ===
On 4 January 2022, he transferred to English club Leeds United on a three-year contract, where he was originally assigned to their U-23 side. He made his senior and professional debut for Leeds United as a starter in an EFL Cup tie away to Wolverhampton Wanderers on 9 November 2022. His Premier League debut came three days later, coming off the bench in an away defeat to Tottenham Hotspur.

In January 2024 Joseph extended his contract with Leeds until the end of the 2027-28 season. On 28 February 2024, he scored his first two senior career goals in a 3–2 defeat away at Chelsea in the FA Cup fifth round.

Joseph scored his first goal of the 2024–25 season in a 2–0 home league win over Hull when he met Manor Solomon's near post cross to open the scoring for The Whites.

Joseph scored a senior career-high three goals with Leeds United during the 2024-25 season, which saw The Whites win the 2024-25 EFL Championship title, earning promotion back to the Premier League for the first time since 2023.

On 9 August 2025, Joseph joined RCD Mallorca on loan for the 2025-26 season.

== International career ==
In March 2023, Joseph received his first call-up to the England U20 squad and made his debut during a 2–0 win over Germany in Manchester on 22 March 2023.

On 10 May 2023, Joseph was included in the England squad for the 2023 FIFA U-20 World Cup.

On 15 March 2024, Joseph was called up by the Spain national under-21 team to play the 2025 UEFA European Under-21 Championship qualification Group B match against Belgium eleven days later.

He featured in the Spanish squad in the 2025 European Under-21 Championship in Slovakia, scoring in the opening group game against the hosts, before Spain were knocked out in a 3–1 quarter-final loss to England on 21 June 2025.

== Personal life ==
Joseph was born in Spain to an English father of Antiguan descent and a Spanish mother. He holds Spanish and British citizenship. He is a relative of Emile Heskey with his father being the former England striker's cousin.

== Career statistics ==
As of match played 4 April 2026

Appearances and goals by club, season and competition
Club	Season	League			FA Cup		EFL Cup		Other		Total	
Club	Season	Division	Apps	Goals	Apps	Goals	Apps	Goals	Apps	Goals	Apps	Goals
Leeds United	2022–23	Premier League	3	0	2	0	1	0	0	0	6	0
Leeds United	2023–24	Championship	20	1	4	2	0	0	2 (Note: Appearances in Championship play-offs)	0	26	3
Leeds United	2024–25	Championship	39	3	2	0	0	0	0	0	41	3
Leeds United	Total		62	4	8	2	1	0	2	0	73	6
Mallorca (loan)	2025–26	La Liga	29	2	1	0	—		—		30	2
Career total			91	6	9	2	1	0	2	0	103	8

== Honours ==
Leeds United

- EFL Championship: 2024–25
