= Kamil Miazek =

Polish footballer

Personal information
- Full name: Kamil Władysław Miazek
- Date of birth: 15 August 1996 (age 30)
- Place of birth: Piotrków Trybunalski, Poland
- Height: 1.93 m (6 ft 4 in)
- Position: Goalkeeper

Team information
- Current team: Polonia Piotrków Trybunalski
- Number: 1

Youth career
- –2007: Włókniarz Moszczenica
- 2007–2012: GKS Bełchatów
- 2012–2016: Feyenoord Academy
- 2017–2018: Leeds United Reserves

Senior career*
Years	Team	Apps	(Gls)
2016–2017	Chojniczanka Chojnice	4	(0)
2018–2020	Leeds United	0	(0)
2021–2024	Warta Sieradz	89	(0)
2024–2025	Star Starachowice	30	(0)
2025–	Polonia Piotrków Trybunalski	40	(0)

International career
2014	Poland U19	1	(0)
- * Club domestic league appearances and goals as of 20:47, 13 September 2026 (UTC)

Kamil Władysław Miazek (born 15 August 1996) is a Polish professional footballer who plays as a goalkeeper for IV liga Łódź club Polonia Piotrków Trybunalski.

Until 2020, he was at English club Leeds United. He was previously a player for the Poland U21s and Dutch side Feyenoord's academy.

== Club career ==
After starting his career at GKS Bełchatów in Poland. Miazek earned a move to Dutch Eredivisie side Feyenoord in 2012, where he progressed through the academy.

=== Chojniczanka Chojnice ===
He joined Polish second division side Chojniczanka Chojnice from Feyenoord in 2016, he made four appearances for the side in a solitary season at the club, before being released.

=== Leeds United ===
Miazek joined Leeds United on trial towards the end of 2017 He impressed and signed a permanent deal at the club in January 2018. He joined the club's academy initially to feature with the Development squad. On 27 June 2018, Miazek signed a new contract at the club.

He made his first start for Leeds' first team when he started in their pre-season friendly 1–1 draw against York City on 20 July 2018, under new head coach Marcelo Bielsa.

On 24 November 2018, after injuries to Bailey Peacock-Farrell and Jamal Blackman, Miazek was named on the bench for the first time for the EFL Championship match against Bristol City. He returned to the bench on 30 March, for suspended goalkeeper Kiko Casilla, in the 3–2 home win over Millwall.

After a successful season with Leeds' under-23s, on 6 May 2019, Miazek saved two penalties (from Joe Redmond and Caolan Boyd-Munce) in a 4–2 penalty shootout (0–0 after extra time) versus Birmingham in the Professional Development League (Category 2) final. Jack Clarke then scored the winner for Leeds. On 18 May, Leeds announced that Miazek, together with reserve keeper, Will Huffer, had had their contracts extended by one year, with the club having taken up an automatic option on their existing contracts.

On 13 July 2019, Miazek was one of just 16 players named in Marcelo Bielsa's 1st team squad for Leeds' 2019–20 pre-season tour of Australia for matches against Manchester United and West Sydney Wanderers. He started the season as Leeds' second-choice goalkeeper after the sale of Bailey Peacock-Farrell.

After the English professional football season was paused in March 2020 due to Impact of the COVID-19 pandemic on association football, the season was resumed during June, where Miazek was part of the squad who earned promotion with Leeds to the Premier League and also become the EFL Championship Champions for the 2019–20 season in July after the successful resumption of the season. Miazek left Leeds in August 2020 when his contract wasn't renewed

=== Polish lower divisions ===
On 4 August 2021, Miazek returned to Poland and joined IV liga Łódź club Warta Sieradz. In his first season with the club, Warta won the Łódź group and earned promotion to the III liga.

In June 2024, he signed a contract with fellow III liga club Star Starachowice.

On 31 July 2025, he moved down a division to join Polonia Piotrków Trybunalski.

== International career ==
He has been capped for Poland at international level at Poland U19s and had received call-ups to Poland U20 as well as Poland U21s after being called up in May 2018.

== Style of play ==
Miazek's goalkeeping style was described by the Yorkshire Evening Post as possessing "good reading of the game" and "willing to play the ball with his feet".

== Career statistics ==
As of match played 12 September 2026

Appearances and goals by club, season and competition
Club	Season	League			National cup (Note: Includes Polish Cup)		League cup		Other		Total	
Club	Season	Division	Apps	Goals	Apps	Goals	Apps	Goals	Apps	Goals	Apps	Goals
Chojniczanka Chojnice	2016–17	I liga	4	0	0	0	—		—		4	0
Leeds United	2018–19	Championship	0	0	0	0	0	0	—		0	0
Leeds United	2019–20	Championship	0	0	0	0	0	0	—		0	0
Leeds United	Total		0	0	0	0	0	0	0	0	0	0
Warta Sieradz	2021–22	IV liga Łódź	34	0	—		—		—		34	0
Warta Sieradz	2022–23	III liga, gr. I	32	0	—		—		—		32	0
Warta Sieradz	2023–24	III liga, gr. I	23	0	—		—		—		23	0
Warta Sieradz	Total		89	0	—		—		—		89	0
Star Starachowice	2024–25	III liga, gr. IV	30	0	1	0	—		—		31	0
Polonia Piotrków Trybunalski	2025–26	IV liga Łódź	32	0	—		—		—		32	0
Polonia Piotrków Trybunalski	2026–27	IV liga Łódź	8	0	—		—		—		8	0
Polonia Piotrków Trybunalski	Total		40	0	—		—		—		40	0
Career total			163	0	1	0	0	0	0	0	164	0

== Honours ==
Leeds United

- EFL Championship: 2019–20

Warta Sieradz

- IV liga Łódź: 2021–22
