= Will Huffer =

English footballer (born 1998)

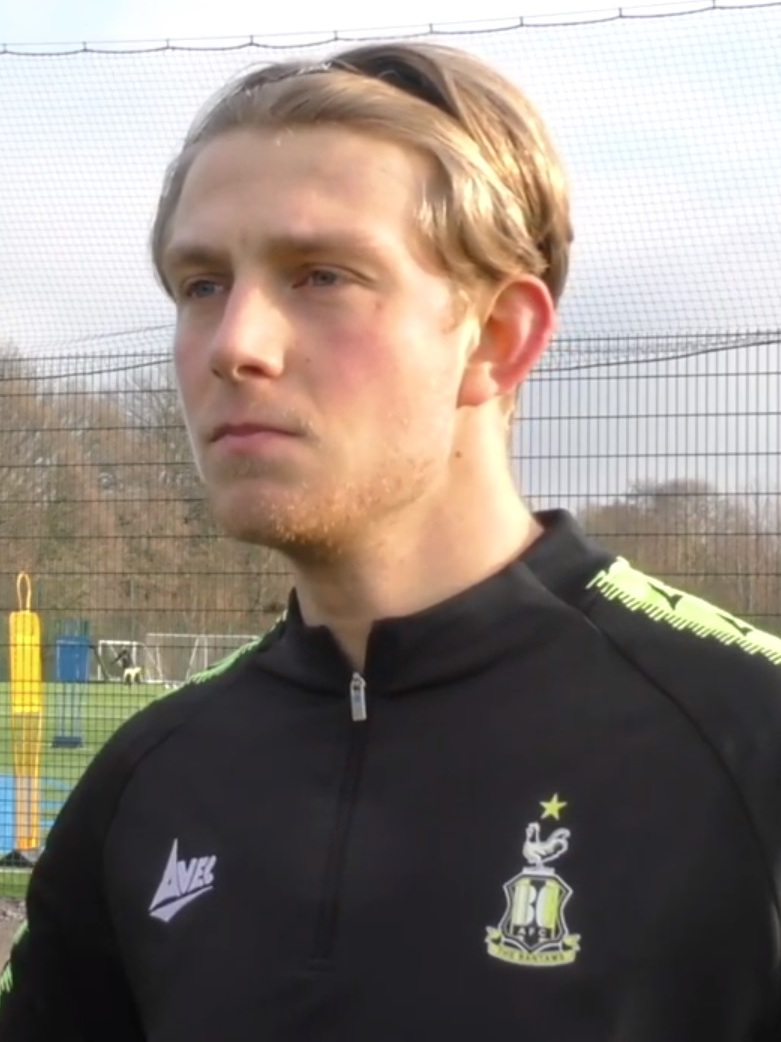
- Huffer in January 2021

Personal information
- Full name: William Matthew Scobie Huffer
- Date of birth: 30 November 1998 (age 27)
- Place of birth: Wandsworth, England
- Height: 6 ft 4 in (1.93 m)
- Position: Goalkeeper

Youth career
- –2018: Leeds United

Senior career*
Years	Team	Apps	(Gls)
2018–2020	Leeds United	1	(0)
2019	→ Barnet (loan)	2	(0)
2020–2021	Bradford (Park Avenue)	0	(0)
2021	Bradford City	0	(0)
2021	AFC Telford United	0	(0)
2021–2022	Stalybridge Celtic	7	(0)
2022–2023	Burgess Hill Town	19	(0)
2023–2024	Carshalton Athletic	13	(0)
2024	Burgess Hill Town	3	(0)
2024	Whitehawk	3	(0)

International career
2014–2015	England U17	7	(0)
2015	England U18	1	(0)
- * Club domestic league appearances and goals as of 11:43, 5 November 2024 (UTC)

William Matthew Scobie Huffer (born 30 October 1998) is an English footballer who last played as a goalkeeper for Whitehawk.

== Career ==
=== Leeds United ===
Huffer started his career at Leeds United's youth academy from an early age. On 21 December 2017, Huffer signed his first professional contract.

He made his first appearance for Leeds' first team in a pre-season friendly 1–1 draw against York City on 20 July 2018, under recently appointed Leeds' head coach Marcelo Bielsa.

Huffer was given the number 13 shirt for the upcoming 2018–19 season for Leeds. His first call up to a senior first-team match was on 14 August when he was named on the bench in the EFL Cup win against Bolton Wanderers.

He made his debut on 24 November 2018 in the EFL Championship against Bristol City, keeping a clean sheet in a 2–0 win, after being named in the starting lineup after injuries to Bailey Peacock-Farrell and Jamal Blackman. He remained Leeds' second choice goalkeeper until the signing of Spanish international goalkeeper Kiko Casilla from Real Madrid in January 2019.

==== Barnet (loan) ====
Huffer joined Barnet on a one-month loan on 25 January 2019. He made his debut for the club on 28 January, starting in a 3–3 draw as Barnet caused an FA Cup upset to earn a replay against Championship opposition Brentford. After five appearances in all competitions, Leeds recalled Huffer from his loan due to an injury to Kamil Miazek.

==== Return to Leeds ====
On 18 May 2019, Leeds announced that Huffer, alongside fellow goalkeeper Kamil Miazek, had extended his contract by one year, with the club having taken up an automatic option on their existing contracts.

Huffer left Leeds in summer 2020 when his contract was not renewed.

=== Bradford (Park Avenue) ===
He joined Bradford (Park Avenue) on a short-term deal on 3 November 2020.

=== Bradford City ===
On 7 January 2021, Huffer signed for League Two side Bradford City with the terms of the transfer undisclosed. On 12 May 2021 he was one of nine players that Bradford City announced would leave the club on 30 June 2021 when their contracts expire.

=== Stalybridge Celtic ===
After a brief spell at AFC Telford United, where he was an unused substitute on one occasion, he signed for Stalybridge Celtic in October 2021. He left the club in January 2022, having made eleven appearances for the club, including seven in the league.

=== Burgess Hill Town ===
Huffer joined Burgess Hill Town in January 2022 and later signed a contract until the end of the 2022–23 season.

=== Carshalton Athletic ===
In June 2023, Huffer joined Carshalton Athletic.

=== Whitehawk ===
In October 2024, following a short spell back with Burgess Hill Town, Huffer joined Whitehawk.

== International career ==
Huffer has represented England at several international levels including under-18. Including proving to be the hero for England under-17's in 2015 saving a penalty in the World Cup Playoff Place game against Spain under-17's to qualify for the Under 17's World Cup in Chile.

He was called up to the England U20 squad in 2018.

== Style of play ==
Yorkshire Evening Post journalist Joe Urqhuart compared Huffer's goalkeeping style similar to former England goalkeeper Joe Hart. With Huffer also described as 'tall, commanding and loud'.

== Personal life ==
In his second year as a professional at Leeds United, Huffer started a degree in classical history in Open University.

== Career statistics ==
As of 19 February 2019

Appearances and goals by club, season and competition
Club	Season	League			FA Cup		League Cup		Other		Total	
Club	Season	Division	Apps	Goals	Apps	Goals	Apps	Goals	Apps	Goals	Apps	Goals
Leeds United	2018–19	Championship	1	0	0	0	0	0	0	0	1	0
Barnet (loan)	2018–19	National League	2	0	1	0	0	0	2	0	5	0
Career total			3	0	1	0	0	0	2	0	6	0
