= Mateusz Klich =

Polish footballer (born 1990)

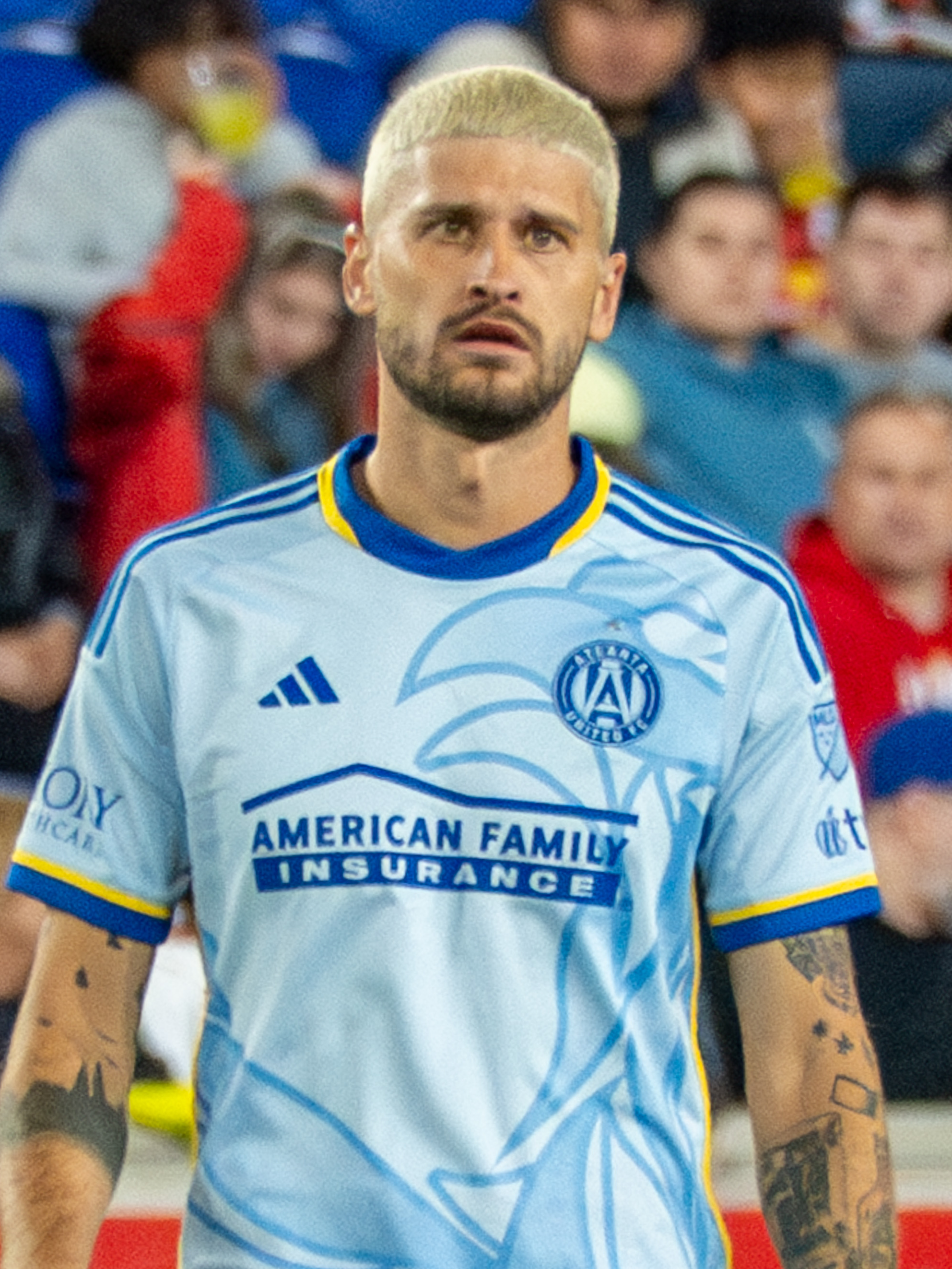
- Klich with Atlanta United in 2025

Personal information
- Full name: Mateusz Andrzej Klich
- Date of birth: 13 June 1990 (age 36)
- Place of birth: Tarnów, Poland
- Height: 1.83 m (6 ft 0 in)
- Position: Midfielder

Team information
- Current team: Cracovia
- Number: 43

Youth career
- 1999–2003: Tarnovia Tarnów
- 2003–2007: Cracovia

Senior career*
Years	Team	Apps	(Gls)
2008–2011	Cracovia	56	(5)
2011–2013	VfL Wolfsburg II	12	(1)
2012–2013	→ PEC Zwolle (loan)	13	(2)
2013–2014	PEC Zwolle	30	(4)
2014–2015	VfL Wolfsburg II	6	(3)
2015–2016	1. FC Kaiserslautern	21	(4)
2015–2016	1. FC Kaiserslautern II	4	(0)
2016–2017	Twente	29	(6)
2017–2023	Leeds United	177	(21)
2018	→ Utrecht (loan)	16	(1)
2023–2024	D.C. United	63	(6)
2025	Atlanta United	16	(0)
2025–	Cracovia	27	(1)

International career
2008	Poland U18	5	(0)
2008	Poland U19	1	(0)
2010–2011	Poland U20	2	(0)
2010–2012	Poland U21	9	(2)
2011–2022	Poland	41	(2)
- * Club domestic league appearances and goals as of 16:35, 29 May 2026 (UTC)

Mateusz Andrzej Klich (Polish pronunciation: [maˈtɛ.uʂ ˈklix]; born 13 June 1990) is a Polish professional footballer who plays as a midfielder for Ekstraklasa club Cracovia.

== Club career ==
=== Cracovia ===
Born in Tarnów, Klich debuted in the Ekstraklasa in November 2008. During the 2009–10 season, he gradually became a regular in Cracovia's starting eleven.

=== Wolfsburg ===
On 14 June 2011, he signed with Bundesliga side VfL Wolfsburg on a three-year deal. Wolfsburg paid €1.5 million for Klich, making him the most valuable player in Cracovia's club history.

=== PEC Zwolle ===
Klich was sent on loan to Dutch club PEC Zwolle for half a season before making the transfer permanent for a fee reported as €200,000, with Wolfsburg securing a repurchase option. During his time at Zwolle he won the 2013–14 KNVB Cup on 20 April 2014 beating Ajax 5–1 in the final which also saw the side obtain Europa League qualification.

=== Return to Wolfsburg ===
In June 2014 Wolfsburg exercised their repurchase option for Klich. During the subsequent first half of the season however, he did not play in the Bundesliga, after struggling to displace regular starters Kevin De Bruyne, Josuha Guilavogui and Luiz Gustavo in the centre midfield positions and was used only in the reserve team.

=== 1. FC Kaiserslautern ===
In early January 2015, Klich joined 2. Bundesliga club 1. FC Kaiserslautern, with him signing a contract until summer 2018. The transfer fee was undisclosed.

=== FC Twente ===
On 26 August 2016, he joined Eredivisie side FC Twente on a three-year contract. He was given squad number 43 and made his debut for Twente on 10 September 2016 against SC Heerenveen. He scored his first goal for the club on 2 October 2016, in a 1–1 draw against Heracles Almelo. In his first season at the club, he scored six goals and made four assists to help FC Twente to a seventh-place finish in the Eredivisie.

=== Leeds United ===
After an initial bid was rejected, on 23 June 2017, Klich signed a three-year deal with English club Leeds United for an undisclosed fee. On 9 August, he made his first-team debut in a 4–1 League Cup victory against Port Vale, and his League debut 10 days later in a 2–0 win against Sunderland. However, he found himself behind Kalvin Phillips, Eunan O'Kane and Ronaldo Vieira in the pecking order.

His first and only League start for the season came on 26 September 2017, in the defeat against Cardiff City with Klich slipping and losing possession leading to a goal from Kenneth Zohore. Klich revealed that he felt his unfortunate slip led to him being dropped by the then manager Thomas Christiansen. After October he was used very sparsely.

On 22 January 2018, Klich joined Dutch club FC Utrecht on a six-month loan from Leeds United until the end of the 2017–18 season.

==== FC Utrecht loan ====
On 22 January 2018, Klich was sent on loan at FC Utrecht until the end of the season. On 4 February 2018, Klich made his debut in a 2–2 draw against Excelsior. He quickly re-found his form at Utrecht, he gained an assist against Roda JC on 18 February in a 4–1 victory.

On 29 April 2018, in Utrecht's 2–2 draw against Heracles Almelo, Klich according to Opta Stats created 11 chances and gained an assist and man of the match award in the match; the chance creation by Klich was the highest number of chances created in a single Eredivisie match since Christian Eriksen for Ajax in 2012 against Roda JC.

On 6 May 2018, on the final day of the season, Klich scored the winner for Utrecht (his first goal for the club) in a 1–0 victory against VVV-Venlo. Klich impressed for Utrecht during the loan spell and helped them finish 5th and into the Eredivisie Europa League playoffs. When asked if he would return to Leeds he said he 'was 99% sure as he had unfinished business'.

==== 2018–19 season ====
After returning to Leeds for the start of pre-season under new Leeds head coach Marcelo Bielsa, Klich made his first appearance back at Leeds in the pre-season friendly 1–1 draw against York City on 20 July 2018, where he played in a new centre-back role before reverting to a deep-lying playmaker position in the second half. He scored his first league goal for Leeds in the opening game of the 2018–19 season on 5 August 2018 against Stoke City at Elland Road in a 3–1 win, his first competitive game for the club in almost seven months. The following week he scored his second goal for the club in a 4–1 win against Derby County on 11 August 2018 and, after scoring against Norwich City on 25 August, his third goal in five games, Klich was named in the Poland squad again for the first time in four years after impressing for Leeds at the beginning of the 2018–19 season.

On 28 April, Klich scored a 'controversial goal' (his ninth of the season). The goal came in a match against Aston Villa during a 1–1 draw, when Jonathan Kodjia remained on the ground with an injury. Teammate Tyler Roberts passed the ball to Klich who took it up the left wing and put the ball into the far corner past Jed Steer. The goal – the first of the game – sparked pandemonium, with Villa's Conor Hourihane, Ahmed Elmohamady, Neil Taylor and Leeds' Patrick Bamford caught up in a fracas with Klich at its centre, which involved several additional players from both sides and was eventually broken up by referee Stuart Attwell, Elland Road stewards and other players. In the immediate aftermath, Attwell sent off the peripherally involved Anwar El Ghazi with a straight red card (subsequently rescinded by The FA) and head coach Marcelo Bielsa's response to his players was, in the interests of fairness and after consulting with Villa boss Dean Smith, that his team should allow an unchallenged equaliser to be scored. From the restart, Albert Adomah essentially walked the ball into net unchallenged by 10 Leeds players, with only Pontus Jansson giving chase and nearly dispossessing the forward.

On 28 April, he won both the Leeds United Goal of the Season award at the club's annual ceremony for his goal against Sheffield Wednesday. On 5 May 2019, Klich scored his 10th goal of the season in a 3–2 defeat against Ipswich Town.

During the 2018–19 Leeds United F.C. season, Klich played 50 games in all competitions, scoring 10 goals and nine assists, being the club's only ever-present player for the League season, after Leeds finished the regular season in third place after dropping out of the automatic promotion places with three games left after a defeat to 10 man Wigan Athletic on 19 April. Leeds qualified for the playoffs, including Klich starting the playoff fixtures against sixth-placed Derby County, despite Leeds taking a 1–0 win at Pride Park into the home leg at Elland Road, Leeds lost 4–2 in an encounter that saw Dallas score a brace in the second leg, with Leeds down to 10 men after the red card of Gaetano Berardi, and saw Derby progress to the final against Aston Villa.

==== 2019–20 season ====
Klich scored his first goal of the 2019–20 season on 13 August in the EFL Cup against Salford City to help earn a 3–0 victory. He scored his second goal of the season in Leeds 2–0 win against Barnsley on 15 September 2019.

On 9 November 2019, Klich signed a new four-and-a-half-year contract with Leeds. Until the penultimate game of the season on 19 July 2020, he had started every league game – 92 games – since Marcelo Bielsa became manager in 2018 and his previous three-year deal with Leeds was due to expire in the summer of 2020. On 30 November, Klich scored two goals in a 4–0 victory against Middlesbrough. This took Leeds to the top of the Championship, and sealed their five-game winning streak. On 19 December, Klich won the EFL Championship Goal of the Month for November for his long range strike against Middlesbrough.

After the English professional football season was paused in March 2020 due to Impact of the COVID-19 pandemic on association football, the season was resumed during June, where Klich earned promotion with Leeds to the Premier League and also become the EFL Championship Champions for the 2019–20 season in July after the successful resumption of the season.

==== 2020–21 season ====
Klich made his Premier League debut in the first match of the season against Liverpool on 12 September 2020, scoring his side's third goal in an enthralling 4–3 defeat to the reigning champions. He scored again and provided an assist in Leeds' second game of the season, a 4–3 win at home against fellow newly promoted side Fulham. He continued his impressive form with an assist in Leeds' 3–0 win away at Aston Villa, and scored a penalty in a 2–1 defeat to West Ham United.

==== 2021–22 season ====
Klich started in Leeds' first Premier League match of the season in a 5–1 away defeat against Manchester United. He had scored just one goal in this season, in their 2–2 draw with Everton, in the 41st minute, gaining two assists.

==== 2022–23 season ====
Klich had only played 16 matches this season, only getting goal contributions in the EFL Cup, both against Barnsley in a 3–1 win at home. Klich had played his final match on 4 January 2023, before his pending move to the United States. Leeds players formed a 'guard of honour' where they had all changed into shirts with Klich's face on the front, with his name and number on the back.

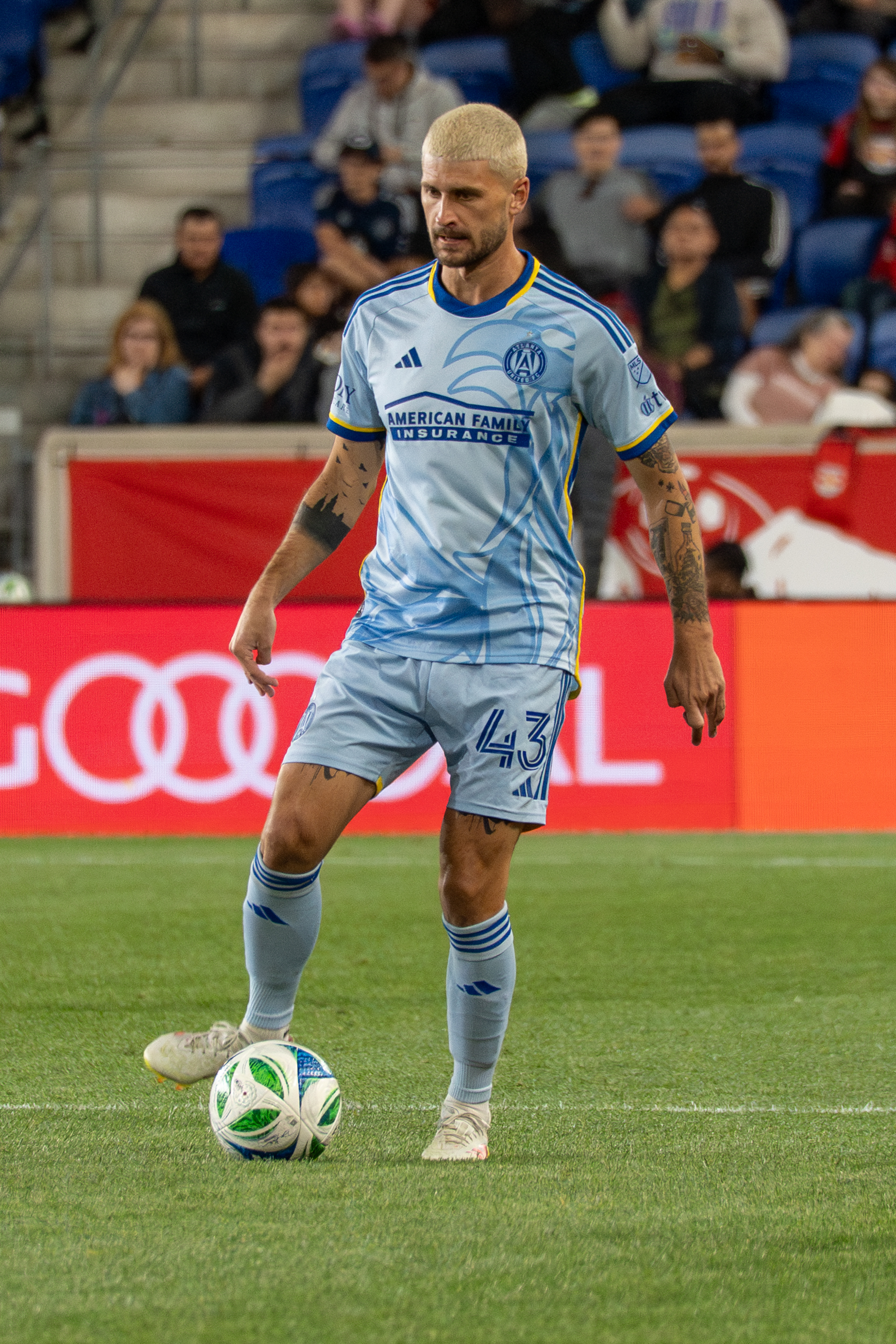
Mateusz Klich with Atlanta United in 2025

=== D.C. United ===
On 12 January 2023, Major League Soccer side D.C. United signed Klich to a two-year Designated Player contract, pending the approval of a work visa. He scored in his debut for D.C. under head coach Wayne Rooney in a 3–2 win against Toronto FC on 25 February. The team failed to qualify for the MLS Cup Playoffs in both seasons that Klich played for them.

=== Atlanta United ===
On 20 December 2024, Klich was traded to Atlanta United by D.C. United in exchange for Atlanta's first round draft pick in the 2025 MLS Draft. He was waived by the club on 21 July 2025, ending his short six-month span with the club.

=== Return to Cracovia ===
On 13 August 2025, Klich agreed to join Cracovia on a two-year deal with an option for a third year, returning to his first professional club after fourteen years.

== International career ==
Klich made his debut for the national team of Poland on 5 June 2011 in a friendly match against Argentina. Poland won the match 2–1. He scored his first goal in national team in another friendly match against Denmark on 14 August 2013.

On 27 August 2018, Klich was called up by manager Jerzy Brzęczek for matches with Italy and Republic of Ireland after a four-year absence from the Poland national side, with Klick impressing for Leeds after scoring three goals and one assist in the first five games of the 2018–19 season. On 7 September, Klich started for Poland in their UEFA Nations League 1–1 draw against Italy, with Klich having an involvement in the opening goal for Piotr Zieliński.

On 11 September, he came off the bench at the 87th minute in another friendly match against Republic of Ireland to score an equalizer, his second national team goal to date. On 17 May 2021, Klich was called up to Poland's UEFA Euro 2020 squad.

== Personal life ==
His father is Wojciech Klich, who was also a professional footballer, playing 84 matches in the Polish first division, and currently works as a youth coach at Cracovia. His mother Małgorzata is a PE teacher who won a bronze medal at the Polish championships for 800m freestyle, whilst his sister Maja is a swimmer. On 6 November 2018, Klich's partner gave birth to his first child, Laura. Leeds United's fans terrace song for Klich '40 Yards or 50 yards' is a reworked version of the song Rotterdam by The Beautiful South. On 4 January 2023, Klich played his last game for Leeds United pending a move to MLS in the United States. At the end of the game the players changed into shirts with Klich's face and formed a 'guard of honour' to clap him off the pitch. Klich was emotional and visibly moved, applauding the crowd and then disappearing down the tunnel.

== Career statistics ==
=== Club ===
As of match played 23 May 2026

Appearances and goals by club, season and competition
Club	Season	League			National cup (Note: Includes Polish Cup, KNVB Cup, DFB-Pokal, FA Cup, U.S. Open Cup)		League cup (Note: Includes EFL Cup)		Other		Total	
Club	Season	Division	Apps	Goals	Apps	Goals	Apps	Goals	Apps	Goals	Apps	Goals
Cracovia	2008–09	Ekstraklasa	5	0	0	0	—		—		5	0
Cracovia	2009–10	Ekstraklasa	21	1	0	0	—		—		21	1
Cracovia	2010–11	Ekstraklasa	27	4	2	0	—		—		29	4
Cracovia	Total		53	5	2	0	—		—		55	5
VfL Wolfsburg II	2011–12	Regionalliga Nord	9	1	—		—		—		9	1
VfL Wolfsburg II	2012–13	Regionalliga Nord	3	0	—		—		—		3	0
VfL Wolfsburg II	Total		12	1	—		—		—		12	1
PEC Zwolle (loan)	2012–13	Eredivisie	13	2	1	0	—		—		14	2
PEC Zwolle	2013–14	Eredivisie	30	4	4	0	—		—		34	4
VfL Wolfsburg II	2014–15	Regionalliga Nord	6	3	—		—		—		6	3
1. FC Kaiserslautern	2014–15	2. Bundesliga	5	1	0	0	—		—		5	1
1. FC Kaiserslautern	2015–16	2. Bundesliga	16	3	2	0	—		—		18	3
1. FC Kaiserslautern	Total		21	4	2	0	—		—		23	4
1. FC Kaiserslautern II	2014–15	Regionalliga Südwest	2	0	—		—		—		2	0
1. FC Kaiserslautern II	2015–16	Regionalliga Südwest	2	0	—		—		—		2	0
1. FC Kaiserslautern II	Total		4	0	—		—		—		4	0
FC Twente	2016–17	Eredivisie	29	6	1	0	—		—		30	6
Leeds United	2017–18	Championship	4	0	1	0	4	0	—		9	0
Leeds United	2018–19	Championship	46	10	0	0	2	0	2 (Note: Appearances in Championship play-offs)	0	50	10
Leeds United	2019–20	Championship	45	6	1	0	1	1	—		47	7
Leeds United	2020–21	Premier League	35	4	1	0	0	0	—		36	4
Leeds United	2021–22	Premier League	33	1	1	0	3	0	—		37	1
Leeds United	2022–23	Premier League	14	0	0	0	2	2	—		16	2
Leeds United	Total		177	21	4	0	12	3	2	0	195	24
FC Utrecht (loan)	2017–18	Eredivisie	12	0	0	0	—		—		12	0
D.C. United	2023	MLS	32	4	1	0	—		3 (Note: Appearances in Leagues Cup)	0	36	4
D.C. United	2024	MLS	31	2	—		—		3	1	34	3
D.C. United	Total		63	6	1	0	—		6	1	70	7
Atlanta United	2025	MLS	16	0	—		—		0	0	16	0
Cracovia	2025–26	Ekstraklasa	27	1	1	0	—		—		28	1
Career total			462	52	16	0	12	3	8	1	498	56

=== International ===
As of match played 22 September 2022

Appearances and goals by national team and year
National team	Year	Apps	Goals
Poland	2011	1	0
Poland	2013	5	1
Poland	2014	4	0
Poland	2018	5	1
Poland	2019	8	0
Poland	2020	7	0
Poland	2021	8	0
Poland	2022	3	0
Total		41	2

Scores and results list Poland's goal tally first, score column indicates score after each Klich goal.

List of international goals scored by Mateusz Klich
No.	Date	Venue	Opponent	Score	Result	Competition
1	14 August 2013	PGE Arena Gdańsk, Gdańsk, Poland	Denmark	1–0	3–2	Friendly
2	11 September 2018	Stadion Miejski, Wrocław, Poland	Republic of Ireland	1–1	1–1	Friendly

== Honours ==
PEC Zwolle

- KNVB Cup: 2013–14

Leeds United

- EFL Championship: 2019–20

Individual

- Leeds United Goal of the Season: 2018–19
