= Kemar Roofe =

Jamaican footballer (born 1993)

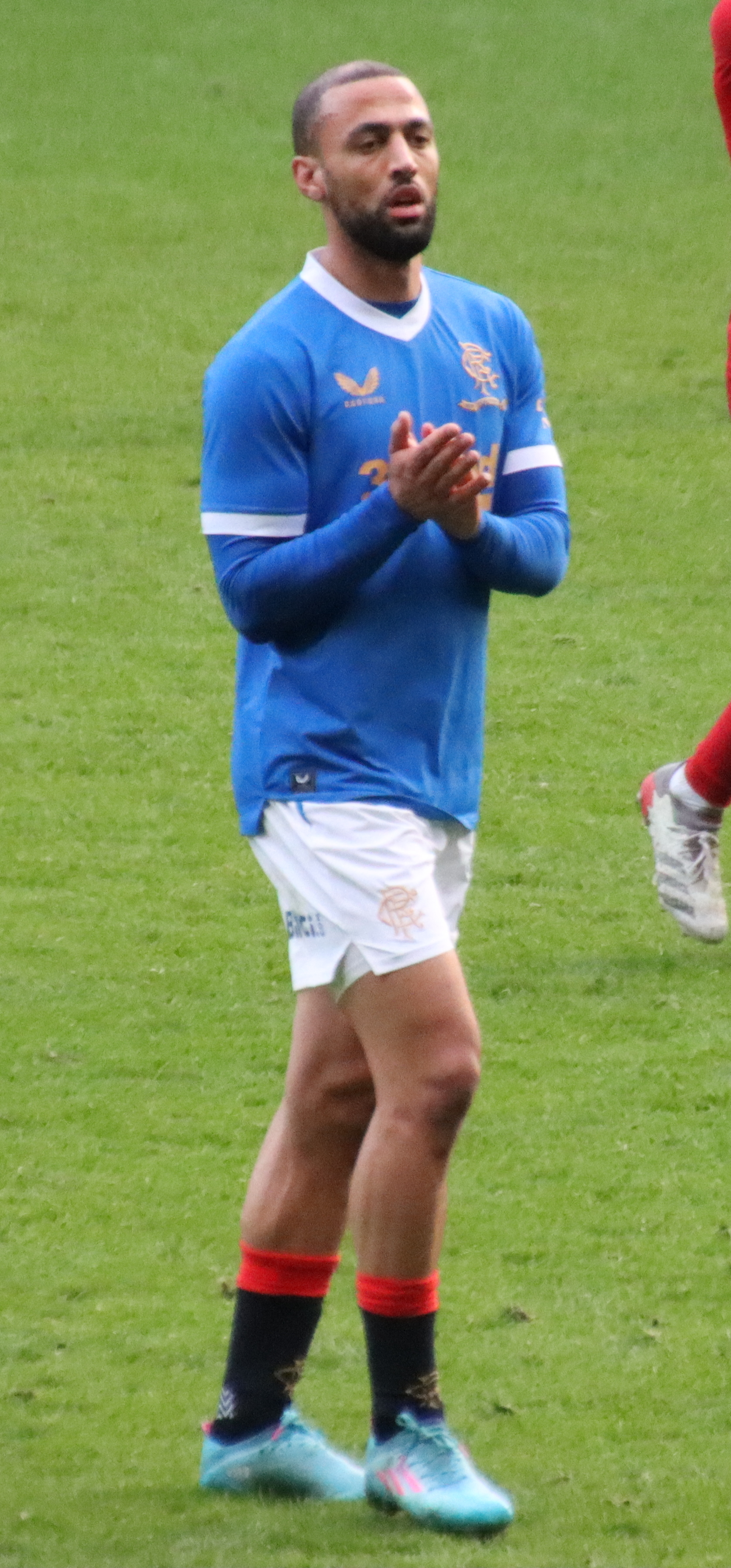
- Roofe with Rangers in 2022

Personal information
- Full name: Kemar Roofe
- Date of birth: 6 January 1993 (age 33)
- Place of birth: Walsall, England
- Height: 5 ft 10 in (1.78 m)
- Position: Forward

Youth career
- 2009–2011: West Bromwich Albion

Senior career*
Years	Team	Apps	(Gls)
2011–2015	West Bromwich Albion	0	(0)
2011	→ Víkingur Reykjavík (loan)	2	(0)
2012	→ Northampton Town (loan)	6	(0)
2013–2014	→ Cheltenham Town (loan)	9	(1)
2014	→ Colchester United (loan)	2	(0)
2015	→ Oxford United (loan)	16	(6)
2015–2016	Oxford United	40	(18)
2016–2019	Leeds United	111	(29)
2019–2020	Anderlecht	13	(6)
2020–2024	Rangers	63	(26)
2025	Derby County	3	(0)
2025–2026	Walsall	2	(0)

International career^{‡}
2021	Jamaica	5	(1)
- * Club domestic league appearances and goals as of 22:23, 9 March 2026 (UTC) ‡ National team caps and goals as of 12 November 2021

Kemar Roofe (born 6 January 1993) is a professional footballer who plays as a forward. Born in England, he has represented the Jamaican national team.

Roofe started his professional career in 2011 at West Bromwich Albion but failed to make a first team appearance, during his spell there had loans at Víkingur Reykjavík, Northampton Town, Cheltenham Town, Colchester United and Oxford United, Roofe would then sign for Oxford United on a permanent basis in 2015, before moving to Leeds United in 2016, after three years at Leeds, Roofe moved to Belgium in 2019 to sign for Anderlecht, before a switch to Scottish club Rangers in 2020, where he remained until his release in the summer of 2024, after being a free agent for 8 months, Roofe joined Derby County on a short-term deal in February 2025; he remained at the club during the following summer as the club assessed his injury before deciding on whether to offer him a contract. A new contract with Derby was not forthcoming and he later signed for hometown club Walsall.

Roofe was capped five times by Jamaica in 2021.

== Club career ==
=== West Bromwich Albion ===
Roofe started his career with West Bromwich Albion where he played for the side's academy team, while attending Joseph Leckie Community Technology College in Walsall. In July 2009, Roofe was among eleven academy youngsters to sign scholarships with West Brom. In April 2011, he was sent out on loan to Icelandic side Víkingur Reykjavík, where he made three appearances, scoring one goal in the Icelandic Cup against Knattspyrnufélag Vesturbæjar. In January 2012, Roofe signed his first professional contract, on an 18-month deal with an option to extend.

On 27 September 2012, he joined Football League Two side Northampton Town on a one-month loan deal. He made his professional debut on 29 September 2012, in a 3–3 draw with Burton Albion, coming on as a substitute for Chris Hackett. After making six appearances for the club, it announced that Roofe would return to his parent club on 27 October 2012. Following the end of the 2012–13 season, Roofe's contract with West Brom was extended for one year.

In the 2013–14 season, Roofe joined Football League Two side Cheltenham Town on loan until 4 January 2014. He made his debut for the club, two days after joining, in a 1–1 draw against Southend United. Roofe scored his first goal for the club in a 2–2 draw against Hartlepool United on 14 December 2013. On 9 January 2014, Roofe's loan spell with Cheltenham Town was extended for another month. After making nine appearances, Roofe informed the club that he wanted to return to his parent club. However, on his return, Roofe returned to the club's reserves throughout the 2013–14 season. Nevertheless, his contract with the club was extended further by twelve months.

In the 2014–15 season, Roofe scored in a friendly match against Port Vale, which West Brom lost. Then, on 4 November 2014, he joined Football League One side Colchester United on a month's loan. A week later, Roofe made his debut for the club, where he came on as a substitute for Sanchez Watt in the second half, in a 3–2 loss against Barnsley. After making two appearances, Roofe's loan spell with Colchester United came to an end and he returned to West Brom.

=== Oxford United ===
On 13 February 2015, Roofe joined Oxford United on loan from West Bromwich Albion. Roofe made his Oxford United debut the next day, coming on as a substitute for Andy Whing in the 61st minute, in a 2–0 defeat to Burton Albion. Despite his not scoring in his first five appearances, Roofe's loan spell with Oxford was extended until the end of the season. Roofe then scored his first Oxford United goals, in a 3–2 win over Wycombe Wanderers on 3 April 2015, and he added four further goals in the last three matches against Tranmere Rovers, Cambridge United and Newport County. His final goal tally for the season was six goals in sixteen appearances.

Weeks after the 2014–15 season ended, Roofe signed a three-year permanent deal with the club on 11 May, for an undisclosed sum. On 11 August 2015, he scored from 40 yards in a 0–4 League Cup upset of Championship side Brentford. On 10 January 2016, Roofe scored twice for Oxford in a 3–2 victory to knock Premier League side Swansea City out of the FA Cup. On 15 March 2016, Roofe scored his first hat-trick in the 4–0 win against Dagenham & Redbridge. Roofe's four goals in the Football League Trophy, including two against rivals Swindon Town, were instrumental in Oxford reaching the 2016 Football League Trophy Final at Wembley Stadium against Barnsley on 3 April 2016. His cross allowed Danny Hylton to score in the second half; however, Barnsley held on for a 3–2 win.

In April 2016 he was voted Football League Two's Player of the Year at the Football League Awards and was also named in the League Two PFA Team Of The Year. He scored 26 goals in 49 appearances in all competitions during the 2015–16 season for Oxford, in which they finished second in League Two and gained promotion to League One.

=== Leeds United ===
On 7 July 2016, Roofe signed for Championship side Leeds United on a four-year deal for an undisclosed seven-figure fee. On 5 August, Roofe was given the squad number 7 shirt for the 2016–17 season. On 7 August, Roofe made his Leeds debut against Queens Park Rangers in a 3–0 defeat. Roofe was initially credited with his first goal for Leeds in a 1–0 win at Wolverhampton Wanderers on 22 October, however it was later adjudicated to be an own goal by Wolves defender Sílvio. After starting the season predominantly on the left side of midfield, after an injury to playmaker Pablo Hernández on 5 November against Norwich City, Roofe found himself playing in an attacking midfield role.

On 29 November 2016, Roofe came close to scoring his first Leeds goal when he saw his long range shot smash off the inside of the post after beating goalkeeper Simon Mignolet, in EFL Cup quarter-final match against Liverpool at Anfield in a 2–0 defeat, after the match Roofe jokingly Tweeted about being under a goalscoring curse with the Hashtag #Pray4Roofe. However, Roofe quickly ended the drought in the following game when he scored his first goal for Leeds United against Aston Villa in a 2–0 victory on 3 December 2016. On 26 December 2016, Roofe scored his second goal for Leeds in a 4–1 victory against Preston North End; he also provided two assists in the same game.

He scored his first goals of the 2017–18 season on 22 August 2017, scoring a hat-trick in Leeds' 5–1 EFL Cup victory against Newport County, thus equalling his goal tally for the previous season for Leeds. On 26 August, Roofe starting up front in place of the departed Chris Wood, scored his first league goal of the season a 2–0 victory against Nottingham Forest. He scored a hat-trick on 10 December in Leeds' 3–1 victory at Queens Park Rangers. Roofe scored his 10th goal of the season in all competitions on 26 December in Leeds' 1–2 victory against Burton Albion. After 6 weeks out with a calf injury, Roofe returned to Leeds' starting lineup on 10 April 2017, and scored his 13th goal of the season in all competitions (his 10th in the League) in a 3–1 loss against Preston North End. On 16 April 2018, Roofe was nominated as one of four players for Leeds United's Player of The Year award. On 6 May 2018, Roofe scored his 14th goal of the season 2–0 home victory against Queens Park Rangers on the final day of the season. He finished the season as the club's top scorer with 14 goals, ahead of Pierre-Michel Lasogga who had scored 10.

He scored his first goals of the 2018–19 season with a brace on 11 August in a 4–1 win over Derby County. After continuing the month in prolific form with four goals and two assists in the first six league games of the season, Roofe was awarded Championship Player of the Month for August 2018 by the EFL.

With Roofe starting the season as the club's first choice striker ahead of new signing Patrick Bamford, after Bamford picked up a posterior cruciate ligament injury in September, Roofe would be the club's only 'senior' striker available for Marcelo Bielsa. However, days after the Bamford injury, Roofe himself picked up a calf injury which would rule him out for some weeks. After returning from injury, Roofe's impressive goalscoring form continued, including scoring a controversial goal against Nottingham Forest in a 1–1 draw on 27 October, with the ball seemingly going in off Roofe's hand.

He was nominated for the EFL Championship Player of the Month award for December 2018, having scored five goals during the month (including three over four days, all in injury time), but lost out on the award to Hull City winger Jarrod Bowen. He scored his 14th goal of the season (which overtook his previous seasons tally of 13) in a 2–0 win against Derby County on 11 January 2019.

However, after playing through Leeds' 2–1 victory against Swansea City on 13 February 2019, after being pictured wearing a leg brace, on 19 February it was announced by the club that Roofe had a knee ligament injury and would face a period out during Leeds' race for promotion. Roofe returned as a substitute during 6 April away game to Birmingham and his appearances since then were limited to spells off the bench, with Bielsa favouring Patrick Bamford as the sole striker.

During the 2018–19 season, Roofe played 34 games in all competitions, scoring 15 goals, after Leeds finished the regular season in third place, having dropped out of the automatic promotion places with three games left following a defeat to 10-man Wigan Athletic on 19 April. Leeds went on to qualify for the playoffs, and Roofe started the first leg of the Championship play-offs at Pride Park on 11 May 2019, netting the sole goal of the game against sixth-placed Derby County for his 15th goal of the season. He was replaced by Patrick Bamford for the second playoff leg at Elland Road after picking up an injury in the second half of the match during the 1–0 win at Pride Park. With Roofe out injured, Leeds lost 4–2 in an encounter that saw both teams reduced to 10 men and Derby progress to the final against Aston Villa, having won 4–3 on aggregate.

After picking up an injury in Leeds' pre-season fixture 2–1 victory against West Sydney Wanderers on Leeds' Australia pre-season tour, Roofe was ruled out for the start of the 2019–20 season with an ankle injury. With Roofe in the final year of his contract, on 5 August he underwent a medical at Belgian side Anderlecht ahead of a proposed move to the club managed by player-manager Vincent Kompany. Ahead of the move, Bielsa proclaimed he "can't be happy" if Roofe leaves.

=== Anderlecht ===
Roofe joined Anderlecht for an undisclosed fee, reported to be £7 million, on 6 August 2019. In his opening seven games in the Belgian league, Roofe scored five times, including an 81st-minute winner at Zulte Waregem. Anderlecht had a slow start to the season and by the end of October were in 10th position. In the last months of 2019, Roofe scored a number of goals, with five of them leading to Anderlecht winning or drawing over a six-week period. Losing only one of seven league games during this period, Anderlecht remained in 10th place in the league.

=== Rangers ===
On 4 August 2020, Roofe signed for Rangers, on a four-year deal for an undisclosed fee, reported to be £4.5 million. He made his Rangers debut just over a week later on 12 August, in a Scottish Premiership match against St Johnstone at Ibrox Stadium, as a 61st-minute substitute for Ryan Jack. On 22 August 2020, Roofe scored his first goal for the club in a league against Kilmarnock, netting the first in a 2–0 win. On 22 October 2020, Roofe scored from his own half in stoppage time of the club's 2–0 UEFA Europa League group stage away win at Standard Liège. Roofe's shot was measured at 49.9 meters from the opposite goal line which at the time made it the longest-range goal ever scored in the history of the competition; however, the record was broken a week later by Omonia midfielder Jordi Gómez, who scored a goal from 56 meters.

On 18 March 2021, Roofe was sent off after six minutes during the Europa League match against Slavia Prague. After a reckless tackle by Roofe, goalkeeper Ondřej Kolář suffered a fractured skull. Former Slavia player and Czech international Vladimír Šmicer called the tackle a "life-threatening moment". The injury virtually ended Kolář's career because it permanently impaired his vision. Roofe was banned for four games. He finished the 2020–21 season as joint second-highest goalscorer (with Kevin Nisbet) in the league on 14 goals.

In the 2022–23 season, after 10 weeks out through injury, Roofe was named as an unused sub in the Ibrox New Year's Old Firm derby and returned to first team action at Tannadice Park on 8 January 2023 as a 78th-minute substitute at for Malik Tillman in the visitors' 2–0 victory. His 94th-minute winner against Aberdeen in the League Cup semi-final, again as a late second-half substitute, saw Rangers go through as 2–1 winners to meet eventual winners Celtic in the final, with Roofe having to leave the field before the end of added time due to a shoulder injury. Roofe left Rangers in June 2024 upon expiry of his contract, he played 102 times for the club, scoring 38 times.

=== Derby County ===
After eight months as a free agent, Roofe joined Derby County of the Championship on a contract until the end of the 2024–25 season. On 22 February 2025, Roofe made his debut for Derby County as a stoppage time substitute for David Ozoh in a 0–1 defeat to Millwall. A hamstring injury picked up in March restricted his appearances for Derby, as he made just three appearances for the club as a late substitute, totaling around 10 minutes in game time. He remained at the club during the following summer as the club assessed his injury before deciding on whether to offer him a contract.

=== Walsall ===
On 14 November 2025, Roofe signed for his hometown club Walsall on a short-term contract that would initially last until the following January. Roofe left the club in February 2026.

== International career ==
Roofe was eligible to represent the England and Jamaica national sides, the latter because of his Jamaican heritage.

In June 2019, Roofe received an invitation to play for the Jamaica national side for the CONCACAF Gold Cup in July 2019.

In March 2021, Jamaica again approached Roofe for inclusion in the team's squad for the 2022 World Cup qualifiers. This time Roofe expressed his interest, stating "who wouldn't want to go to a World Cup?" and revealing he was already in the process of applying for a Jamaican passport in order to play for the nation. He debuted with Jamaica in a 3–0 2022 FIFA World Cup qualification loss to Panama on 5 September 2021. The next month, on 13 October, Roofe scored his first goal for Jamaica, netting the opener against Honduras in an eventual 2–0 victory.

== Personal life ==
Roofe is the cousin of R&B and pop singer Jorja Smith. He also helps his brother, Alex, design and make garments for their clothing range, Custom Rare.

== Appearances on television ==
In August 2019, Roofe was one of the main stars of Leeds United documentary Take Us Home, documenting the 2018–19 season on Amazon Prime featuring in several episodes. The documentary was narrated by Academy Award winning actor and Leeds United fan Russell Crowe.

== Career statistics ==
=== Club ===
As of match played 7 December 2025

Appearances and goals by club, season and competition
Club	Season	League			National cup (Note: Includes Icelandic Men's Football Cup, FA Cup, Belgian Cup, Scottish Cup)		League cup (Note: Includes EFL Cup, Scottish League Cup)		Europe		Other		Total	
Club	Season	Division	Apps	Goals	Apps	Goals	Apps	Goals	Apps	Goals	Apps	Goals	Apps	Goals
West Bromwich Albion	2011–12	Premier League	0	0	0	0	0	0	—		—		0	0
West Bromwich Albion	2012–13	Premier League	0	0	0	0	0	0	—		—		0	0
West Bromwich Albion	2013–14	Premier League	0	0	0	0	0	0	—		—		0	0
West Bromwich Albion	2014–15	Premier League	0	0	0	0	0	0	—		—		0	0
West Bromwich Albion	Total		0	0	0	0	0	0	0	0	0	0	0	0
Víkingur Reykjavík (loan)	2011	Úrvalsdeild	2	0	1	1	—		—		—		3	1
Northampton Town (loan)	2012–13	League Two	6	0	0	0	0	0	—		1 (Note: Appearances in Football League Trophy)	0	7	0
Cheltenham Town (loan)	2013–14	League Two	9	1	0	0	0	0	—		0	0	9	1
Colchester United (loan)	2014–15	League One	2	0	1	0	0	0	—		0	0	3	0
Oxford United (loan)	2014–15	League Two	16	6	0	0	0	0	—		0	0	16	6
Oxford United	2015–16	League Two	40	18	4	3	1	1	—		3	4	48	26
Leeds United	2016–17	Championship	42	3	2	0	5	0	—		—		49	3
Leeds United	2017–18	Championship	36	11	0	0	3	3	—		—		39	14
Leeds United	2018–19	Championship	33	15	0	0	1	0	—		1 (Note: Appearance in Championship play-offs)	1	35	16
Leeds United	Total		111	29	2	0	9	3	0	0	1	1	123	33
Anderlecht	2019–20	Belgian First Division A	13	6	3	1	—		—		—		16	7
Rangers	2020–21	Scottish Premiership	24	14	3	2	1	0	8 (Note: Appearances in UEFA Europa League)	2	—		36	18
Rangers	2021–22	Scottish Premiership	21	10	4	1	2	3	9	2	—		36	16
Rangers	2022–23	Scottish Premiership	3	1	1	0	2	1	0	0	—		6	2
Rangers	2023–24	Scottish Premiership	15	1	1	0	3	0	5	1	—		24	2
Rangers	Total		63	26	9	3	8	4	22	5	0	0	102	38
Derby County	2024–25	Championship	2	0	—		—		—		—		2	0
Walsall	2025–26	League Two	2	0	1	0	0	0	0	0	1	0	4	0
Career total			266	86	21	8	18	8	23	5	5	5	333	112

=== International ===
As of match played 12 November 2021

Appearances and goals by national team and year
National team	Year	Apps	Goals
Jamaica	2021	5	1
Total		5	1

Scores and results list Jamaica's goal tally first, score column indicates score after each Roofe goal.

List of international goals scored by Kemar Roofe
No.	Date	Venue	Opponent	Score	Result	Competition
1	13 October 2021	Estadio Olímpico Metropolitano, San Pedro Sula, Honduras	Honduras	1–0	2–0	2022 FIFA World Cup qualification

== Honours ==
Oxford United

- Football League Trophy runner-up: 2015–16

Rangers

- Scottish Premiership: 2020–21
- Scottish Cup: 2021–22
- Scottish League Cup: 2023–24
- UEFA Europa League runner-up: 2021–22

Individual

- The Football League Team of the Season: 2015–16
- PFA Team of the Year: 2015–16 League Two
- EFL Championship Player of the Month: August 2018
- UEFA Europa League Goal of the Season: 2020–21
