= 2018–19 Leeds United F.C. season =

2018–19 season of Leeds United

Leeds United
2018–19 season
- Chairman: Andrea Radrizzani
- Head coach: Marcelo Bielsa
- Stadium: Elland Road
- Championship: 3rd
- Play-offs: Semi-finals
- FA Cup: Third round
- EFL Cup: Second round
- Top goalscorer: League: Kemar Roofe (14); All: Kemar Roofe (15)
- Highest home attendance: 37,004 vs Sheffield United (17 March 2019, Championship)
- Lowest home attendance: 18,652 vs Preston North End (28 August 2018, EFL Cup)
- Average home league attendance: 33,834
Home colours	Away colours	Third colours

The 2018–19 season saw Leeds United competing in the Championship (known as the Sky Bet Championship for sponsorship reasons) for a ninth successive season.

== Season summary ==
Leeds' season started with an impressive win against relegated Stoke City at Elland Road, followed by a 4–1 win against Frank Lampard's Derby County at Pride Park, moving Leeds up to 3rd in the Championship table.

Leeds' first defeat of the season was against former manager Garry Monk's Birmingham City in mid September, but by the turn of the year the side were in pole position, despite a 4–2 defeat to Nottingham Forest at the City Ground on 1 January 2019.

Before a 2–0 victory over Derby County on 11 January 2019, manager Marcelo Bielsa admitted he had sent a spy to Derby's training ground, after reports emerged in the press that a man was spotted the previous day outside the training ground. Derby manager Frank Lampard was critical of Bielsa's method. On 12 January, Leeds United released a statement in response to the incident. Tottenham Hotspur Manager Mauricio Pochettino described the incident as 'not a big deal' and commonplace in Argentina.

On 15 January, the EFL announced they would be investigating the incident. With intense media scrutiny on what was coined 'Spygate' in the media, Bielsa announced a press briefing on 16 January 2019, where he gave a detailed analysis of his research on a PowerPoint presentation to the gathered media and journalists, detailing his meticulousness, thoroughness and preparation over his opponents, with some journalists in attendance describing it as a 'coaching masterclass' and 'genius'.

The 'Spygate' saga was resolved on 18 February, when Leeds were fined a sum of £200,000 by the EFL for breach of a portion of Rule 3.4 of EFL Regulations ("In all matters and transactions relating to The League each Club shall behave towards each other Club and The League with the utmost good faith."), with the EFL also announcing a new rule as a result, that teams could not watch opposition training up to 72 hours before a game. It was subsequently revealed, by Bielsa, that he paid the £200,000 fine in full himself.

Towards the end of January, Leeds missed out on signing Daniel James with the deal being pulled on the final day, but did sign Kiko Casilla from Real Madrid.

The team's form dipped in January and February, whilst some pointed towards the implications of Spygate, Bielsa refused to make excuses outside of himself.

Damaging defeats in March to Sheffield United and Birmingham City had left the promotion race out of their hands, and would need Norwich City and Sheffield United to slip up in order for Leeds to be promoted automatically. Two wins against Preston North End and Sheffield Wednesday briefly raised hopes before losses to 10 man Wigan at home and an away loss to Brentford would mean the side enter the playoffs.

This rendered their last two games almost meaningless, however they didn't go by quietly. The visit of Aston Villa saw tempers flare during the second half. The officials waved away calls for a foul as Mateusz Klich took the lead for the Whites.

As players and staff broke out into a fracas, Marcelo Bielsa ordered his players to stand aside and Aston Villa were able to equaliser through an unopposed goal. The Leeds manager and his side later won the 2019 FIFA Fair Play award for their sportsmanship in this action.

Leeds entered the playoffs and played Derby County over two legs. In the first leg at Pride Park, Kemar Roofe handed Leeds a lead in the tie before returning to Elland Road.

Stuart Dallas gave the side a 2-0 aggregate lead, before a mix up between Kiko Casilla and Liam Cooper just before half time allowed Jack Marriott to reduce the deficit and give Frank Lampard's Derby County hope.

Negativity crept in and the home side threw the second leg away, allowing Derby to win 3-4 on aggregate. Jack Marriott's late goal sending Frank Lampard's Derby County to the playoff final.

== Pre-season and friendlies ==
Leeds United announced pre-season friendlies against Forest Green Rovers, York City, Southend United, Oxford United, Guiseley and Las Palmas.

Win Draw Loss Fixtures

17 July 2018 Friendly	Forest Green Rovers	1–2	Leeds United	Nailsworth
19:00 BST	Grubb 45'	Report	Roofe 16'; Ayling 25'	Stadium: The New Lawn; Attendance: 3,250; Referee: Sam Allison

19 July 2018 Friendly	York City	1–1	Leeds United	York
19:00 BST	Tait 24'	Report	Dalby 57'	Stadium: Bootham Crescent; Attendance: 4,400; Referee: Ross Joyce

22 July 2018 Friendly	Southend United	1–1	Leeds United	Southend
14:00 BST	Lennon 20'	Report	Ayling 34'	Stadium: Roots Hall; Attendance: 3,815; Referee: Gavin Ward

24 July 2018 Friendly	Oxford United	4–3	Leeds United	Oxford
19:45 BST	Henry 7', 43'; Hall 26'; Obika 61'	Report	Roberts 53'; Baker 63'; Clarke 71'	Stadium: Kassam Stadium; Attendance: 4,727; Referee: Anthony Coggins

26 July 2018 Friendly	Guiseley	3–4	Leeds United	Guiseley
19:45 BST	Clayton 3'; Thompson 29'; Morrison 73'	Report	Klich 39'; Clarke 49'; Edmondson 53', 71'	Stadium: Nethermoor Park; Attendance: 3,366; Referee: Jonathan Moss

29 July 2018 Friendly	Leeds United	1–0	Las Palmas	Leeds
15:00 BST	Roofe 86'			Stadium: Elland Road; Attendance: 11,449; Referee: Andy Madley

== Competitions ==
=== Championship ===
==== League table ====
Pos	Team	Pld	W	D	L	GF	GA	GD	Pts	Promotion, qualification or relegation
1	Norwich City (C, P)	46	27	13	6	93	57	+36	94	Promotion to the Premier League
2	Sheffield United (P)	46	26	11	9	78	41	+37	89	Promotion to the Premier League
3	Leeds United	46	25	8	13	73	50	+23	83	Qualification for Championship play-offs (Note: Four teams play for one spot and promotion to the Premier League.)
4	West Bromwich Albion	46	23	11	12	87	62	+25	80	Qualification for Championship play-offs
5	Aston Villa (O, P)	46	20	16	10	82	61	+21	76	Qualification for Championship play-offs
6	Derby County	46	20	14	12	69	54	+15	74	Qualification for Championship play-offs

Source: Sky Sports Archived 25 September 2019 at the Wayback Machine
Rules for classification: 1) Points; 2) Goal difference; 3) Number of goals scored; 4) Head-to-head results
(C) Champions; (O) Play-off winners; (P) Promoted

==== Results summary ====
Overall								Home						Away					
Pld	W	D	L	GF	GA	GD	Pts	W	D	L	GF	GA	GD	W	D	L	GF	GA	GD
46	25	8	13	73	50	+23	83	14	4	5	38	21	+17	11	4	8	35	29	+6

Source: BBC

==== Results by matchday ====
Matchday	1	2	3	4	5	6	7	8	9	10	11	12	13	14	15	16	17	18	19	20	21	22	23	24	25	26	27	28	29	30	31	32	33	34	35	36	37	38	39	40	41	42	43	44	45	46
Ground	H	A	H	A	A	H	A	H	H	A	A	H	A	H	H	A	A	H	H	A	H	A	A	H	H	A	H	A	A	H	A	H	H	A	H	A	A	H	H	A	A	H	H	A	H	A
Result	W	W	W	D	W	D	D	W	L	D	W	D	L	W	D	W	L	W	W	W	W	W	W	W	L	L	W	L	W	L	D	W	W	L	W	W	W	L	W	L	W	W	L	L	D	L
Position	3	2	2	1	1	1	1	1	1	2	1	3	4	1	2	1	3	3	2	2	2	1	1	1	1	1	1	1	1	2	2	1	1	3	2	2	2	3	2	3	2	2	3	3	3	3

Source: Statto.com
A = Away; H = Home; W = Win; D = Draw; L = Loss

==== Matches ====
5 August 2018 1	Leeds United	3–1	Stoke City	Leeds
16:30 BST	Klich 15'; Hernández 45+1'; Cooper 57'	Report	Afobe 52' (pen.)	Stadium: Elland Road; Attendance: 34,126; Referee: Scott Duncan

11 August 2018 2	Derby County	1–4	Leeds United	Derby
17:30 BST	Lawrence 12'	Report	Klich 5'; Roofe 21', 60'; Alioski 64'	Stadium: Pride Park Stadium; Attendance: 27,311; Referee: Peter Bankes

18 August 2018 3	Leeds United	2–0	Rotherham United	Leeds
15:00 BST	Ayling 49'; Roofe 71'	Report		Stadium: Elland Road; Attendance: 33,699; Referee: Robert Jones

21 August 2018 4	Swansea City	2–2	Leeds United	Swansea
19:45 BST	McBurnie 24', 51'	Report	Roofe 40'; Hernández 79'	Stadium: Liberty Stadium; Attendance: 20,860; Referee: Andy Davies

25 August 2018 5	Norwich City	0–3	Leeds United	Norwich
15:00 BST		Report	Klich 21'; Alioski 26'; Hernández 67'	Stadium: Carrow Road; Attendance: 25,944; Referee: Simon Hooper

31 August 2018 6	Leeds United	0–0	Middlesbrough	Leeds
19:45 BST		Report		Stadium: Elland Road; Attendance: 35,417; Referee: Tim Robinson

15 September 2018 7	Millwall	1–1	Leeds United	Bermondsey
15:00 BST	Wallace 55'	Report	Harrison 89'	Stadium: The Den; Attendance: 17,195; Referee: Chris Kavanagh

18 September 2018 8	Leeds United	3–0	Preston North End	Leeds
19:45 BST	Cooper 37'; Roberts 74', 82'	Report		Stadium: Elland Road; Attendance: 27,729; Referee: Geoff Eltringham

22 September 2018 9	Leeds United	1–2	Birmingham City	Leeds
15:00 BST	Alioski 85'	Report	Adams 8', 29'	Stadium: Elland Road; Attendance: 34,800; Referee: Peter Bankes

28 September 2018 10	Sheffield Wednesday	1–1	Leeds United	Sheffield
19:45 BST	Reach 45'	Report	Klich 54'	Stadium: Hillsborough Stadium; Attendance: 26,717; Referee: Robert Jones

2 October 2018 11	Hull City	0–1	Leeds United	Hull
19:45 BST		Report	Roberts 51'	Stadium: KCOM Stadium; Attendance: 13,798; Referee: Darren Bond

6 October 2018 12	Leeds United	1–1	Brentford	Leeds
12:30 BST	Jansson 88'	Report	Maupay 62' (pen.)	Stadium: Elland Road; Attendance: 31,880; Referee: Jeremy Simpson

20 October 2018 13	Blackburn Rovers	2–1	Leeds United	Blackburn
12:00 BST	Graham 2'; Lenihan 69'	Report	Klich 45+1'	Stadium: Ewood Park; Attendance: 20,929; Referee: Darren England

24 October 2018 14	Leeds United	2–0	Ipswich Town	Leeds
19:45 BST	Roofe 22'; Cooper 66'	Report		Stadium: Elland Road; Attendance: 29,082; Referee: Craig Pawson

27 October 2018 15	Leeds United	1–1	Nottingham Forest	Leeds
17:30 BST	Roofe 82'	Report	Robinson 11'	Stadium: Elland Road; Attendance: 34,308; Referee: Geoff Eltringham

4 November 2018 16	Wigan Athletic	1–2	Leeds United	Wigan
13:30 GMT	James 6'	Report	Hernández 9'; Roofe 46'	Stadium: DW Stadium; Attendance: 14,799; Referee: Andy Davies

10 November 2018 17	West Bromwich Albion	4–1	Leeds United	West Bromwich
17:30 GMT	Robson-Kanu 51'; Phillips 67'; Barnes 82'; Gayle 83'	Report	Hernández 90+2'	Stadium: The Hawthorns; Attendance: 25,661; Referee: Lee Mason

24 November 2018 18	Leeds United	2–0	Bristol City	Leeds
15:00 GMT	Roofe 69'; Hernández 86'	Report		Stadium: Elland Road; Attendance: 34,333; Referee: Scott Duncan

27 November 2018 19	Leeds United	1–0	Reading	Leeds
19:45 GMT	Dallas 60'	Report		Stadium: Elland Road; Attendance: 27,806; Referee: Mike Dean

1 December 2018 20	Sheffield United	0–1	Leeds United	Sheffield
12:30 GMT		Report	Hernández 82'	Stadium: Bramall Lane; Attendance: 25,794; Referee: Oliver Langford

8 December 2018 21	Leeds United	2–1	Queens Park Rangers	Leeds
15:00 GMT	Roofe 45+3', 53' (pen.)	Report	Wells 26'	Stadium: Elland Road; Attendance: 33,781; Referee: Peter Bankes

15 December 2018 22	Bolton Wanderers	0–1	Leeds United	Bolton
15:00 GMT		Report	Bamford 66'	Stadium: University of Bolton Stadium; Attendance: 17,484; Referee: Robert Jones

23 December 2018 23	Aston Villa	2–3	Leeds United	Birmingham
13:30 GMT	Abraham 5'; Hourihane 17'	Report	Clarke 56'; Jansson 61'; Roofe 90+5'	Stadium: Villa Park; Attendance: 41,411; Referee: Andrew Madley

26 December 2018 24	Leeds United	3–2	Blackburn Rovers	Leeds
15:00 GMT	Williams 33' (o.g.); Roofe 90+1', 90+4'	Report	Mulgrew 47', 90'	Stadium: Elland Road; Attendance: 34,863; Referee: Steve Martin

29 December 2018 25	Leeds United	0–2	Hull City	Leeds
15:00 GMT		Report	Bowen 25', 58'	Stadium: Elland Road; Attendance: 35,754; Referee: John Brooks

1 January 2019 26	Nottingham Forest	4–2	Leeds United	Nottingham
15:00 GMT	Colback 5', 69'; Murphy 72'; Osborn 76'	Report	Clarke 52'; Alioski 64'	Stadium: City Ground; Attendance: 29,530; Referee: Darren England

11 January 2019 27	Leeds United	2–0	Derby County	Leeds
19:45 GMT	Roofe 25'; Harrison 47'	Report		Stadium: Elland Road; Attendance: 34,668; Referee: Andy Davies

19 January 2019 28	Stoke City	2–1	Leeds United	Stoke
15:00 GMT	Clucas 49'; Allen 88'	Report	Alioski 90+5'	Stadium: Bet365 Stadium; Attendance: 28,586; Referee: Gavin Ward

26 January 2019 29	Rotherham United	1–2	Leeds United	Rotherham
15:00 GMT	Ajayi 28'	Report	Klich 51', 86'	Stadium: New York Stadium; Attendance: 11,259; Referee: Tim Robinson

2 February 2019 30	Leeds United	1–3	Norwich City	Leeds
17:30 GMT	Bamford 90'	Report	Vrančić 5', 78'; Pukki 35'	Stadium: Elland Road; Attendance: 36,524; Referee: Stuart Attwell

9 February 2019 31	Middlesbrough	1–1	Leeds United	Middlesbrough
13:00 GMT	Wing 47'	Report	Phillips 90+11'	Stadium: Riverside Stadium; Attendance: 30,881; Referee: Darren England

13 February 2019 32	Leeds United	2–1	Swansea City	Leeds
19:45 GMT	Jansson 20'; Harrison 34'	Report	McBurnie 87' (pen.)	Stadium: Elland Road; Attendance: 34,044; Referee: David Webb

23 February 2019 33	Leeds United	2–1	Bolton Wanderers	Leeds
15:00 GMT	Bamford 16' (pen.); Alioski 68'	Report	Beevers 22'	Stadium: Elland Road; Attendance: 34,144; Referee: Tony Harrington

26 February 2019 34	Queens Park Rangers	1–0	Leeds United	Shepherd's Bush
19:45 GMT	Freeman 49'	Report		Stadium: Loftus Road; Attendance: 14,763; Referee: Andy Davies

1 March 2019 35	Leeds United	4–0	West Bromwich Albion	Leeds
19:45 GMT	Hernández 1'; Bamford 28', 63'; Alioski 90+2'	Report		Stadium: Elland Road; Attendance: 35,888; Referee: Tim Robinson

9 March 2019 36	Bristol City	0–1	Leeds United	Bristol
15:00 GMT		Report	Bamford 9'	Stadium: Ashton Gate; Attendance: 24,832; Referee: Peter Bankes

12 March 2018 37	Reading	0–3	Leeds United	Reading
20:00 GMT		Report	Klich 14'; Hernández 22', 43'	Stadium: Madejski Stadium; Attendance: 17,101; Referee: Gavin Ward

16 March 2019 38	Leeds United	0–1	Sheffield United	Leeds
12:30 GMT		Report	Basham 71'	Stadium: Elland Road; Attendance: 37,004; Referee: David Coote

30 March 2019 39	Leeds United	3–2	Millwall	Leeds
15:00 GMT	Hernández 34', 83'; Ayling 71'	Report	Thompson 10'; Marshall 55' (pen.)	Stadium: Elland Road; Attendance: 34,910; Referee: Darren Bond

6 April 2019 40	Birmingham City	1–0	Leeds United	Bordesley
15:00 BST	Adams 29'	Report		Stadium: St Andrews; Attendance: 24,197; Referee: Mike Dean

9 April 2019 41	Preston North End	0–2	Leeds United	Preston
19:45 BST		Report	Bamford 62', 76'	Stadium: Deepdale; Attendance: 18,019; Referee: Robert Jones

13 April 2019 42	Leeds United	1–0	Sheffield Wednesday	Leeds
17:30 BST	Harrison 65'	Report		Stadium: Elland Road; Attendance: 36,461; Referee: Tim Robinson

19 April 2019 43	Leeds United	1–2	Wigan Athletic	Leeds
15:00 BST	Bamford 17'	Report	Massey 44', 62'	Stadium: Elland Road; Attendance: 34,758; Referee: Scott Duncan

22 April 2019 44	Brentford	2–0	Leeds United	Brentford
17:15 BST	Maupay 45'; Canós 62'	Report		Stadium: Griffin Park; Attendance: 11,580; Referee: Keith Stroud

28 April 2019 45	Leeds United	1–1	Aston Villa	Leeds
12:00 BST	Klich 72'	Report	Adomah 77'	Stadium: Elland Road; Attendance: 36,786; Referee: Stuart Attwell

5 May 2019 46	Ipswich Town	3–2	Leeds United	Ipswich
12:15 BST	Downes 30'; Dozzell 47'; Quaner 90'	Report	Klich 45'; Dallas 76'	Stadium: Portman Road; Attendance: 20,895; Referee: Gavin Ward

==== Play-offs ====
11 May 2019	Derby County	0–1	Leeds United	Derby
17:15 BST		Report	Roofe 55'	Stadium: Pride Park Stadium; Attendance: 31,723; Referee: Craig Pawson

15 May 2019	Leeds United	2–4 (3–4 agg.)	Derby County	Leeds
19:45 BST	Dallas 24', 62'	Report	Marriott 45', 85'; Mount 46'; Wilson 58' (pen.)	Stadium: Elland Road; Attendance: 36,326; Referee: Anthony Taylor

=== FA Cup ===
6 January 2019 3	Queens Park Rangers	2–1	Leeds United	Shepherd's Bush
14:00 GMT	Oteh 23' (pen.); Bidwell 75'	Report	Halme 25'	Stadium: Loftus Road; Attendance: 11,637; Referee: Geoff Eltringham

=== EFL Cup ===
14 August 2018 1	Leeds United	2–1	Bolton Wanderers	Leeds
19:45 BST	Bamford 27'; Sáiz 35'	Report	Oztumer 52'	Stadium: Elland Road; Attendance: 19,617; Referee: Andy Haines

28 August 2018 2	Leeds United	0–2	Preston North End	Leeds
19:45 BST		Report	Johnson 2' (pen.); Barker 45+1'	Stadium: Elland Road; Attendance: 18,652; Referee: Tony Harrington

== Statistics ==
No.	Pos.	Name	League		Play-offs		FA Cup		EFL Cup		Total		Discipline	
No.	Pos.	Name	Apps	Goals	Apps	Goals	Apps	Goals	Apps	Goals	Apps	Goals	Yellow card	Red card
1	GK	(Northern Ireland) Bailey Peacock-Farrell	28	0	0	0	1	0	0	0	29	0	1	0
2	DF	(England) Luke Ayling	38	2	2	0	1	0	1	0	42	2	6	1
3	DF	(Scotland) Barry Douglas	21+6	0	0	0	0	0	0	0	21+6	0	8	0
4	MF	(England) Adam Forshaw	19+11	0	1	0	1	0	0	0	21+11	0	3	0
6	DF	(Scotland) Liam Cooper	36	3	2	0	0	0	0	0	38	3	6	0
7	FW	(England) Kemar Roofe	27+5	14	1	1	0	0	0+1	0	28+6	15	6	0
9	FW	(England) Patrick Bamford	15+7	9	1	0	0	0	2	1	18+7	10	3	0
10	DF	(North Macedonia) Ezgjan Alioski	44	7	0	0	1	0	0+2	0	45+2	7	10	0
11	FW	(Wales) Tyler Roberts	20+8	3	0	0	1	0	2	0	23+8	3	4	0
13	GK	(England) Will Huffer	1	0	0	0	0	0	0	0	1	0	0	0
14	MF	(Spain) Samuel Sáiz	15+4	0	0	0	0	0	1+1	1	16+5	1	4	0
15	DF	(Northern Ireland) Stuart Dallas	10+16	2	2	2	0	0	1	0	13+16	4	2	0
18	DF	(Sweden) Pontus Jansson	37+2	3	0	0	0	0	2	0	39+2	3	8	1
19	MF	(Spain) Pablo Hernández	37+2	12	2	0	0	0	0	0	39+2	12	6	0
20	DF	(England) Tom Pearce	0+2	0	0	0	0+1	0	2	0	2+3	0	0	0
22	MF	(England) Jack Harrison	32+5	4	2	0	1	0	2	0	37+5	4	2	0
23	MF	(England) Kalvin Phillips	42	1	2	0	0	0	2	0	46	1	8	1
27	GK	(England) Jamal Blackman	0	0	0	0	0	0	2	0	2	0	0	0
28	DF	(Switzerland) Gaetano Berardi	10+3	0	2	0	0	0	0	0	12+3	0	6	1
33	GK	(Spain) Kiko Casilla	17	0	2	0	0	0	0	0	19	0	2	1
34	MF	(England) Lewis Baker	2+9	0	0	0	1	0	2	0	5+9	0	2	0
35	DF	(Republic of Ireland) Conor Shaughnessy	0	0	0	0	0	0	1	0	1	0	0	0
36	MF	(England) Izzy Brown	0+1	0	0+1	0	0	0	0	0	0+2	1	0	0
39	FW	(England) Ryan Edmondson	0+1	0	0	0	0	0	0	0	0+1	0	0	0
40	DF	(England) Leif Davis	1+3	0	0	0	1	0	0	0	2+3	0	0	0
43	MF	(Poland) Mateusz Klich	46	10	2	0	0	0	0+2	0	48+2	10	10	0
46	MF	(England) Jamie Shackleton	3+16	0	1+1	0	1	0	2	0	7+17	0	0	0
47	FW	(England) Jack Clarke	4+18	2	0+2	0	1	0	0	0	5+20	2	1	0
48	MF	(England) Jordan Stevens	0+1	0	0	0	0	0	0	0	0+1	0	0	0
52	DF	(Finland) Aapo Halme	1+3	0	0	0	1	1	0	0	2+3	1	2	0
54	MF	(England) Clarke Oduor	0	0	0	0	0+1	0	0	0	0+1	0	0	0
57	FW	(Bulgaria) Kun Temenuzhkov	0	0	0	0	0+1	0	0	0	0+1	0	0	0

== Transfers ==
=== In ===
Date	Pos.	Name	From	Fee	Ref.
1 July 2018	DF	(England) Joshveer Shergill	(England) Walsall	£25,000	
4 July 2018	DF	(England) Leif Davis	(England) Morecambe	Undisclosed	
28 July 2018	DF	(Scotland) Barry Douglas	(England) Wolverhampton Wanderers	£3,000,000	
31 July 2018	FW	(England) Patrick Bamford	(England) Middlesbrough	£7,000,000	
17 January 2019	GK	(Spain) Kiko Casilla	(Spain) Real Madrid	Free	
29 January 2019	MF	(Poland) Mateusz Bogusz	(Poland) Ruch Chorzów	Undisclosed	
29 March 2019	MF	(Norway) Morten Spencer	(England) Sunderland	Undisclosed	

=== Out ===
Date	Pos.	Name	To	Fee	Ref.
19 June 2018	GK	(Germany) Felix Wiedwald	(Germany) Eintracht Frankfurt	Undisclosed	
1 July 2018	FW	(Nigeria) Moses Abioye	Unattached	Released	
1 July 2018	MF	(Spain) Madger Gomes	Unattached	Released	
1 July 2018	DF	(England) Matthew Keogh	Unattached	Released	
1 July 2018	FW	(England) Moise Kroma	Unattached	Released	
1 July 2018	MF	(Guinea-Bissau) Romario Vieira	Unattached	Released	
5 July 2018	GK	(England) Andy Lonergan	(England) Middlesbrough	Free	
14 July 2018	FW	(Sweden) Marcus Antonsson	(Sweden) Malmö FF	Undisclosed	
1 August 2018	MF	(England) Ronaldo Vieira	(Italy) Sampdoria	£6,000,000	
2 August 2018	MF	(England) Luke Murphy	(England) Bolton Wanderers	Free	
3 August 2018	FW	(Morocco) Ousama Siddiki	(Spain) Logroñés	Undisclosed	
31 January 2019	FW	(Ghana) Samuel Amissah	(Latvia) FK Liepāja	Undisclosed	

=== Loan in ===
Date from	Date to	Pos.	Name	From	Ref.
1 July 2018	9 January 2019	MF	(England) Lewis Baker	(England) Chelsea	
16 July 2018	16 November 2018	GK	(England) Jamal Blackman	(England) Chelsea	
30 July 2018	31 May 2019	MF	(England) Jack Harrison	(England) Manchester City	
30 August 2018	31 May 2019	MF	(England) Izzy Brown	(England) Chelsea	

=== Loan out ===
Date from	Date to	Pos.	Name	To	Ref.
1 July 2018	31 May 2019	DF	(England) Lewie Coyle	(England) Fleetowood Town	
3 July 2018	31 December 2018	FW	(Sweden) Paweł Cibicki	(Norway) Molde	
5 July 2018	31 May 2019	FW	(Netherlands) Jay-Roy Grot	(Netherlands) VVV-Venlo	
6 July 2018	31 May 2019	DF	(England) Tyler Denton	(England) Peterborough United	
6 July 2018	8 January 2019	DF	(Republic of Ireland) Paudie O'Connor	(England) Blackpool	
11 July 2018	31 May 2019	FW	(England) Malik Wilks	(England) Doncaster Rovers	
19 July 2018	31 May 2019	FW	(Spain) Alex Machuca	(Spain) Burgos	
20 July 2018	2 January 2019	DF	(England) Liam Kitching	(England) Harrogate Town	
31 July 2018	26 January 2019	FW	(Portugal) Hadi Sacko	(Spain) Las Palmas	
21 August 2018	31 May 2019	DF	(Belgium) Laurens De Bock	(Belgium) Oostende	
21 August 2018	31 May 2019	MF	(Japan) Yosuke Ideguchi	(Germany) Greuther Fürth	
24 August 2018	31 May 2019	FW	(Spain) Adrián Balboa	(Spain) Terrassa	
24 August 2018	31 May 2019	MF	(Netherlands) Ouasim Bouy	(Netherlands) PEC Zwolle	
29 August 2018	31 May 2019	FW	(Ghana) Caleb Ekuban	(Turkey) Trabzonspor	
31 August 2018	31 May 2019	MF	(Netherlands) Vurnon Anita	(Netherlands) Willem II	
31 August 2018	10 January 2019	MF	(Republic of Ireland) Eunan O'Kane	(England) Luton Town	
1 September 2018	31 May 2019	FW	(Montenegro) Oliver Šarkić	(Spain) Barakaldo CF	
1 January 2019	31 May 2019	MF	(Spain) Samuel Sáiz	(Spain) Getafe	
7 January 2019	31 May 2019	MF	(Republic of Ireland) Conor Shaughnessy	(Scotland) Heart of Midlothian	
8 January 2019	31 May 2019	DF	(Republic of Ireland) Paudie O'Connor	(England) Bradford City	
11 January 2019	31 May 2019	MF	(Sweden) Paweł Cibicki	(Sweden) IF Elfsborg	
25 January 2019	25 February 2019	GK	(England) Will Huffer	(England) Barnet	
29 January 2019	31 May 2019	FW	(Portugal) Hadi Sacko	(Turkey) Ankaragücü	
31 January 2019	31 May 2019	FW	(England) Sam Dalby	(England) Morecambe	
31 January 2019	31 May 2019	DF	(England) Tom Pearce	(England) Scunthorpe United	
