= Patrick Bamford =

English footballer (born 1993)

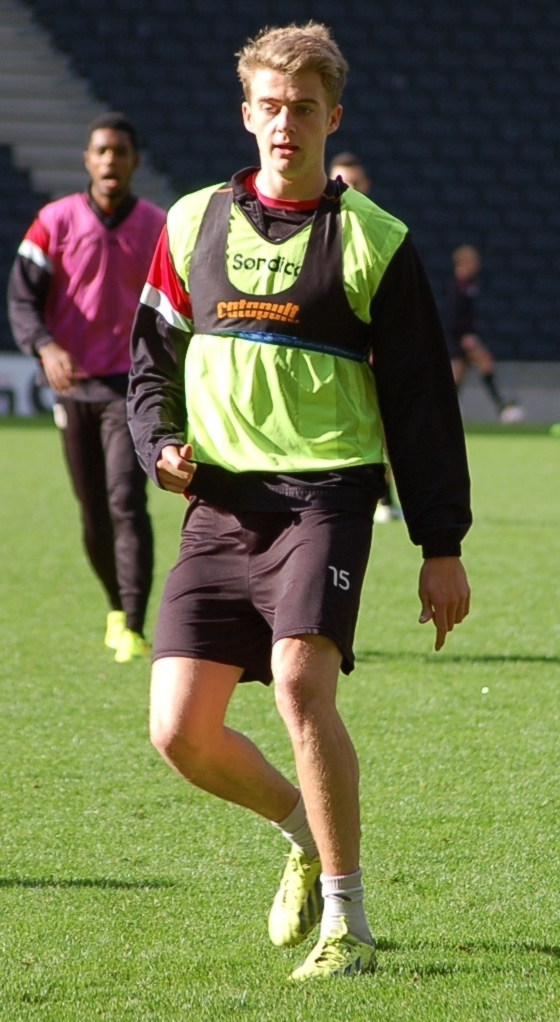
- Bamford with Milton Keynes Dons in 2013

Personal information
- Full name: Patrick James Bamford
- Date of birth: 5 September 1993 (age 33)
- Place of birth: Grantham, England
- Height: 6 ft 1 in (1.85 m)
- Position: Striker

Team information
- Current team: Sheffield United
- Number: 45

Youth career
- 2001–2011: Nottingham Forest

Senior career*
Years	Team	Apps	(Gls)
2011–2012	Nottingham Forest	2	(0)
2012–2017	Chelsea	0	(0)
2012–2013	→ Milton Keynes Dons (loan)	14	(4)
2013–2014	→ Milton Keynes Dons (loan)	23	(14)
2014	→ Derby County (loan)	21	(8)
2014–2015	→ Middlesbrough (loan)	38	(17)
2015	→ Crystal Palace (loan)	6	(0)
2016	→ Norwich City (loan)	7	(0)
2016–2017	→ Burnley (loan)	6	(0)
2017–2018	Middlesbrough	47	(12)
2018–2025	Leeds United	192	(56)
2025–	Sheffield United	40	(17)

International career
2010	Republic of Ireland U18	1	(0)
2010–2011	England U18	2	(0)
2012	England U19	2	(1)
2013–2014	England U21	2	(0)
2021	England	1	(0)
- * Club domestic league appearances and goals as of 22:33, 21 November 2026 (UTC)

Patrick James Bamford (born 5 September 1993) is an English professional footballer who plays as a striker for EFL Championship club Sheffield United.

Bamford began his career at Nottingham Forest, making his debut in December 2011, at the age of 18. A month later he joined Chelsea for a fee of £1.5 million. He was loaned out to Milton Keynes Dons, Derby County, and Middlesbrough, winning the Championship Player of the Year for the 2014–15 season. Bamford then had further loans at Premier League clubs Crystal Palace, Norwich City and Burnley, but saw limited playing time.

After five years at the club without making a first-team appearance, Bamford left Chelsea and returned to Middlesbrough for a fee in the region of £5.5 million in January 2017. He subsequently joined Leeds United in July 2018 for a fee possibly rising to £10 million, and helped the club win the Championship title during the 2019–20 season and gain promotion to the Premier League.

Bamford was capped by the Republic of Ireland at under-18 level before changing allegiances to England. He has represented England from under-18 to senior level, making his senior debut in September 2021.

== Early life ==
Bamford was born in Grantham, Lincolnshire, and raised in the small, nearby village of Norwell, Nottinghamshire. He joined Nottingham Forest's academy as an eight-year-old after playing junior football for Muskham Cougars. He attended the independent fee-paying Nottingham High School, where due to the lack of a school football team, he played rugby union as a full-back, until the end of Year 10. Bamford ended up with five A*s, three As and two Bs in his GCSEs. He studied French, History, Biology, and General Studies at A-Level and attained three Bs and a C. Bamford was offered a place at Harvard University and on the Harvard Men's Soccer team, but he rejected the offer to continue his career in England.

Described by the Yorkshire Evening Post in 2018 as "not your typical footballer", he plays the piano, violin, guitar and saxophone, and is conversational in French, Spanish, and German. He has said that his more privileged upbringing has led him to be treated differently in a sport where most players are from the working class.

== Club career ==
=== Nottingham Forest ===
Bamford was an unused substitute during Forest's League Cup third round tie against Newcastle United at the City Ground on 21 September 2011, a 4–3 defeat after extra time. He made his Forest debut against Cardiff City in a 1–0 home defeat on 31 December, coming on as a substitute for Matt Derbyshire with 12 minutes remaining. He appeared in Forest's next game on 2 January 2012, coming on again as an added-time substitute for Andy Reid as Forest beat Ipswich Town 3–1 at Portman Road.

=== Chelsea ===
On 31 January 2012, Bamford joined Chelsea on a five-year contract for a fee of £1.5 million. On 8 February 2012, he started to train with Chelsea's first-team squad. He made his debut for the reserves in a friendly against Gillingham at Cobham, with Chelsea emerging victorious 5–4. Bamford netted his first goal in Chelsea colours, rounding off a tidy team move and also scored his second, the winner from the penalty spot. On 21 July 2015, Bamford signed a new three-year contract with Chelsea before being loaned out to Crystal Palace for the upcoming season.

==== Loan to Milton Keynes Dons ====
On 22 November 2012, he signed on loan at Milton Keynes Dons (MK Dons) until 7 January. He made his debut three days later against Colchester United, and ended the match with three assists. Manager Karl Robinson said that he hoped Bamford would stay until the end of season.

On 31 January 2013, Bamford's loan was extended until 20 May, having impressed enough before sustaining a hamstring injury. On 19 March, he netted the first goal of his professional career at Crewe Alexandra's Gresty Road.

On 1 July, Bamford rejoined MK Dons on loan until 5 January 2014. Bamford scored 14 league goals in 23 appearances for MK Dons during this six-month period, and thus was the subject of speculation that he would be sent on loan to a club at a higher level. On 31 December, Karl Robinson confirmed that Bamford would not be returning to MK Dons after his loan deal expired. His new club was later announced as Derby County. He made his last appearance for Milton Keynes on 4 January 2014, where he scored his 17th goal of the season in the closing stages of a 3–3 draw against the holders Wigan Athletic in the third round of the FA Cup.

==== Loan to Derby County ====
On 3 January 2014, Derby County confirmed the signing of Bamford on a loan until the end of the season. Bamford made his debut for Derby as a substitute on 10 January, in a 4–1 away defeat to Leicester City. His first goal came in his next game, at home to Brighton & Hove Albion, when he opened the scoring in the 76th minute after coming on as a 59th-minute substitute for Simon Dawkins. He dedicated the goal to his godfather, former Nottingham Forest chairman Nigel Doughty. On 24 January, Bamford won the Football League Young Player of the Month award for December following his performances on loan at MK Dons. One day later, he scored his 19th goal of the season in a 1–1 draw against Blackburn Rovers. Bamford continued his great form, scoring in the next two matches, against Yeovil Town on 28 January and against Birmingham City on 1 February. On 18 February, Bamford's strike earned Derby a 1–0 win at Hillsborough against Sheffield Wednesday. However, he failed to score in the next six games for Derby, but on 25 March, he scored in a 2–1 loss against Ipswich. In the next game on 29 March against Charlton Athletic, he scored the second of three goals, capitalising on an error by the captain Johnnie Jackson in the 38th minute. Bamford continued his goalscoring form as he netted his 25th of the season away from home against Blackpool on 8 April.

==== Loan to Middlesbrough ====
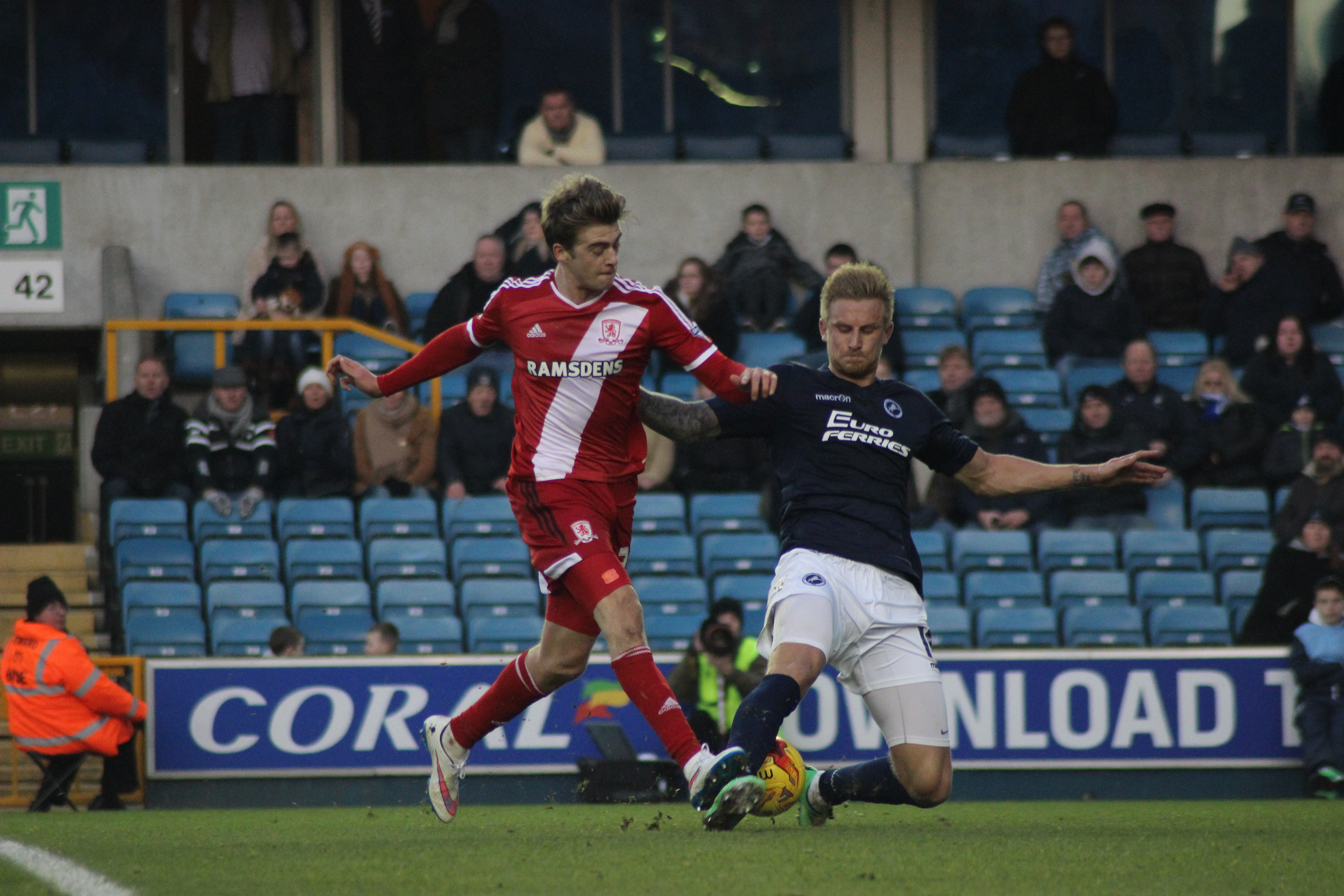
Bamford (left) playing for Middlesbrough in 2015

On 29 August 2014, Bamford joined Middlesbrough on loan until 1 January. Bamford made his debut as a substitute on 30 August 2014, in a 1–0 home defeat to Reading. On 20 September he scored his debut goal for Boro in his first start for the club: a 4–0 home win over Brentford.

Bamford replaced Grant Leadbitter for the final eight minutes of extra time in the third round of the League Cup against Liverpool on 23 September. In added time, he was fouled by Kolo Touré for a penalty which he converted himself to make the score 2–2, thus resulting in a penalty shootout. Although his penalty in the shoot-out was saved by Simon Mignolet, he scored one in sudden death, but Middlesbrough lost 14–13 on penalties.

After scoring in the League Cup against Liverpool on 23 September, Bamford went through a dry period of four games without scoring. On 1 November, he scored the opening goal in a 3–0 win over Rotherham United. He scored again three days later against Norwich City in a 4–0 win for Boro. On 22 November, Bamford came off the bench in the 55th minute against Wigan Athletic, and within three minutes of coming onto the pitch, scored the goal which levelled the game, the match ending in a 1–1 draw. Bamford continued his fine scoring form, scoring Boro's only goal on 29 November to share the points with Blackburn Rovers and on 6 December in a 5–1 win at The Den against Millwall: four goals in five games.

Bamford again continued to impress during the game against league leaders Derby County on 13 December, in which he scored the opening goal within the first six minutes, and later won a penalty which was converted by Leadbitter in a 2–0 win. The result moved his team into 2nd place in the Championship, level on points with Bournemouth. On 31 December, his loan was extended for the remainder of the season.

On 24 January 2015, in the fourth round of the FA Cup, Bamford exploited an error by Fernando to open the scoring as Middlesbrough defeated reigning Premier League champions Manchester City 2–0 away.

On 3 April, Bamford sent Middlesbrough to the top of the Championship table by scoring his 17th goal of the season in a 1–0 win against Wigan Athletic. On 11 April, he scored his 18th goal of the season against Rotherham United, but did miss a penalty during stoppage-time after fighting over who would take it with fellow striker Kike who won the penalty originally. Later on, Bamford revealed that he was the designated penalty-taker and apologised to his teammate for missing the penalty. Also that month, he was nominated at the Football League Awards for Championship Player of the Year and Young Player of the Year. He won the first award, with the second going to Dele Alli of Milton Keynes Dons.

Bamford ended the 2014–15 season with 19 goals in total, 17 coming in the league, making him the team's top scorer for the season.

==== Loan to Crystal Palace ====
On 21 July 2015, Bamford signed on loan for Crystal Palace for the upcoming season. After a successful pre-season with Crystal Palace, which included a hat-trick against Bromley, Bamford was an unused substitute for Palace's opening match against Norwich City on 8 August. He made his competitive debut for Palace eight days later in a 2–1 home defeat to Arsenal, replacing James McArthur for the final ten minutes.

On 28 December, Bamford terminated his loan spell and returned to Chelsea after featuring as a substitute in the 0–0 draw against Swansea City. Bamford cited lack of first-team opportunities as the reason for his departure. It was subsequently reported that Bamford's decision had been made by himself alone, and that the two clubs involved were to hold talks over his future.

==== Loan to Norwich City ====
On 30 January 2016, after terminating his loan spell with Crystal Palace, Bamford joined Norwich City on loan until the end of the season. Bamford was given the number 11 jersey upon arrival. On 6 February 2016, Bamford made his debut for the Canaries in a 2–0 away defeat to Aston Villa, replacing Wes Hoolahan in the 56th minute. On 12 March 2016, he made his first Premier League start in a 0–0 draw with Manchester City, where he had the best opportunity of the game to score with a shot from 25 yards out which hit the bar.

==== Loan to Burnley ====
On 30 August 2016, Bamford joined Burnley on a season-long loan. Ten days later, he made his debut by replacing Andre Gray in the 80th minute of a 1–1 draw against Hull City. After making six Premier League appearances, his loan was cut short after he was recalled by Chelsea on 14 January 2017, with Bamford citing a clash of personalities with the Burnley manager Sean Dyche during his spell at the club.

=== Return to Middlesbrough ===
On 18 January 2017, Bamford joined Middlesbrough, then in the Premier League, on a four-and-a-half-year deal in the region of £5.5 million, reuniting him with Aitor Karanka. Three days later, he made his debut off the bench in a 3–1 loss against West Ham United. On 8 May 2017, Bamford faced his former team, Chelsea in a 3–0 defeat at Stamford Bridge, resulting in the relegation of Middlesbrough. On 13 May, Bamford made his first start of the season and scored his first ever Premier League goal in a 2–1 loss against Southampton.

After an injury to the lone striker Rudy Gestede in February 2018, during the 2017–18 season, Bamford was moved from out wide to a lone striker role under manager Tony Pulis, where he flourished and, on 2 March 2018, scored his first ever hat-trick against Leeds United. In April, he was nominated for the Player of the Month award for March 2018, but lost out to Fulham striker Aleksandar Mitrović.

Bamford scored 13 goals in 44 appearances in all competitions during the 2017–18 season, to help Middlesbrough reach the Championship play-off semi-finals, where they were eliminated by Aston Villa.

=== Leeds United ===
==== 2018–19 season ====
On 31 July 2018, Bamford joined Leeds United for an undisclosed fee on a four-year contract. He was given the number 9 shirt for the season. The fee was believed to be £7 million (rising up to £10 million depending on bonuses), making Bamford Leeds' most expensive signing since Robbie Fowler had joined Leeds in 2001. He made his debut on 11 August in a 4–1 win at Derby County. On 14 August, Bamford made his first start for Leeds in an EFL Cup fixture against Bolton Wanderers, the game also saw him score his first goal for the club in a 2–1 win.

On 7 September 2018, Bamford started for the Leeds United under-23 team against Bristol City. He scored the first goal of the game in a 5–0 win, but hobbled off the pitch after half an hour with a suspected knee injury. The following week, Leeds announced that the striker had suffered a posterior cruciate ligament injury and was facing four months on the sidelines.

On 15 December, Bamford returned from his cruciate ligament injury as a second-half substitute against Bolton, opening the scoring for his first league goal for the club in a 1–0 win. However, he picked up another knee ligament injury in training before the following game against Aston Villa and was ruled out for several weeks.

Bamford made a return from injury to first-team action on 2 February 2019, scoring in a 3–1 defeat against Norwich City. He made his first start for Leeds in the league, in Leeds' 1–1 draw against his old side Middlesbrough on 9 February 2019.

He took his tally to six goals for the season (one in an EFL Cup home tie in August against Bolton), after scoring a brace in a 4–0 win against West Bromwich Albion on 1 March. Despite following up with the game's only goal at Bristol City a week later, Bamford's form slumped during March, and included a missed penalty at Elland Road against Millwall on 30 March, but he scored both goals in a powerful display in Leeds's 2–0 win at Preston on 9 April and, in his 200th professional appearance, Leeds' only goal in their shock 1–2 defeat by 10-man Wigan 10 days later.

On 30 April 2019, the Football Association handed Bamford a two-match ban after charging him with "successful deception of a match official" during the home game against Aston Villa in which Bamford feigned injury in a fracas involving Anwar El Ghazi. El Ghazi's red card was later rescinded by the FA and Bamford received a two-match ban for deception. Replays showed that Bamford had dived to the ground clutching his face despite no contact being made.

During the 2018–19 season, Bamford played 25 games in all competitions, scoring 10 goals in an injury-hit season after Leeds finished the regular season in third place, having dropped out of the automatic promotion places with three games left following a defeat to 10-man Wigan on 19 April. Leeds qualified for the playoffs and, with Bamford out suspended, Kemar Roofe started the first leg of the Championship play-offs at Pride Park on 11 May 2019, netting the sole goal of the game against sixth-placed Derby County for Roofe's 15th goal of the season.

But Roofe was replaced in the starting line-up of the Elland Road return leg by a returning (from suspension) Bamford, after Roofe picked up an injury in the second half of the 1–0 win at Pride Park. However, Leeds were beaten 4–3 on aggregate over the two legs: with Roofe out injured, Leeds lost the home leg 4–2 in an encounter that saw both teams reduced to 10 men and Derby progress to the final against Aston Villa (which Villa won, joining already-promoted Norwich City and Sheffield United in the Premier League for the 2019–20 season). Bamford finished the season with 13 goals across 44 games for Leeds.

In August 2019, Bamford was one of the main stars of the Amazon Prime documentary Take Us Home, telling the story of the 2018–19 season. He featured in several episodes, and the series was narrated by Academy Award-winning actor and Leeds fan Russell Crowe.

==== 2019–20 season ====
Citing the fact that he was now "focused on being a lot more aggressive" after the summer, Bamford scored his first goal of the 2019–20 season on 4 August in Leeds' opening day 3–1 victory against Bristol City. With both goals to his name in the away tie at Wigan on 17 August and a goal at Stoke the following week, Bamford brought his tally to four league goals from five Championship games.

His performances saw him one of six players nominated in September for the Championship PFA Player of the Month for August 2019; however, Bamford lost out to his teammate Ben White who won the award on 4 September.

With criticism of Bamford building following the striker's three-game goal drought and Derby's 91st-minute equaliser at Elland Road on 21 September 2019, head coach Marcelo Bielsa noted through his translator at the post-game press conference, that "if we want to analyse, we cannot avoid to have this talk," concerning the attacking issues of the current team. "Maybe we can be more efficient with [Bamford and Nketiah] in the team," he noted about the 1–1 result where, having dominated possession yet squandering at least 10 goalscoring opportunities to Derby's one shot on goal – by half-time, Leeds had had 71% possession – Bielsa continued that:

two goalscorers are ... better [able] to take advantage of 10 chances. ... But we should see which player we take out from the team and [what] is going to be the result if we take out one player behind the attackers, the goalscorer. ...If we play with two goalscorers, maybe Forshaw or Klich are out of the team – Shackleton/Forshaw/Klich – and...one centre-forward without two midfielders behind him is going to make worse the building of the attack. So if you have two centre-forwards [in] one team that doesn't create a lot of chances, you cannot take advantage of the results that you have. This is my way of thinking.

Referring to the 79th-minute substitution of Eddie Nketiah for Bamford, Bielsa noted: "When I put Nketiah on the pitch I was thinking [of] taking out Klich and that Eddie and Bamford play together – Bamford behind Eddie. Bamford [took] this decision: he has to be combine[d] and he's starting to know some players, in the case of Nketiah for example, he needs to know how he combines with ... both of them." Teammate Kalvin Phillips in a separate interview after the same game, believed that "Pat's played very well today, to be honest. I think he was unlucky to be brought off but I think, you know, once Pat starts scoring, once he gets a goal or two, he'll just fly, because he's getting in them positions where one's going to go in eventually." Bamford, however, did not manage to find the net in September or October and in nearly every game during those two months was substituted, mostly by Nketiah, at various points in the second half, but his 30th-minute penalty against Blackburn on 9 November at Elland Road (in which he also provided the final ball for Jack Harrison's game-winning goal just five minutes later) broke a 10-game goal scoring drought for the centre-forward and he recorded his tenth goal of the season in Leeds's pre-Christmas 2–1 loss at Fulham.

Coming on as a half-time replacement for Nketiah on 1 January 2020, in the Arsenal loanee's final game for Leeds at then-second-placed West Brom, Bamford had an immediate impact, heading home Leeds's sole goal of the game (although a deflection saw it counted as an own goal). The 1–1 result kept Leeds on top of the table on goal difference.

However, with the departure of Nketiah, Bamford's profligacy in front of goal during the 0–2 home loss to Sheffield Wednesday on 11 January, and in the 1–0 loss at Loftus Road seven days later (where he missed a penalty), brought the club's striking options into sharp focus, although by March he had found the net again: in Leeds' 2–0 win over Huddersfield Town.

The English professional football season was paused in March 2020 due to the impact of the COVID-19 pandemic and resumed three months later. Leeds' first home game following that break was on 27 June, when Bamford scored the 10th-minute opening goal in their 3–0 victory over then-fourth-placed Fulham. This scoreline restored Leeds to the top of the Championship division table. The following week, Bamford opened the scoring again as Leeds beat Blackburn 3–1. The interrupted 2019–20 season was eventually completed in late July, and Bamford finished the season with 16 goals, making him Leeds United's top scorer by a large margin. The club won the Championship title, thereby returning to the Premier League after a 16-year absence.

==== 2020–21 season ====
Bamford started the first three Premier League fixtures of Leeds United's season, scoring in each game: against Liverpool (netting the second goal in a 4–3 away defeat), against Fulham, in a 4–3 home win and, with a late header at Bramall Lane, in a 1–0 win over Sheffield United. On 2 October 2020, Bamford was nominated for Premier League Player of the Month for the three goals and one assist he had in September but lost out to Everton's Dominic Calvert-Lewin.

In Leeds' second game back after the international break, Bamford scored his first Premier League hat trick, in a 3–0 away win on 23 October over Aston Villa. He was the winner of the Professional Footballers' Association Fans' Bristol Street Motors Premier League Player of the Month for September and October and scored his 100th professional goal on 8 February 2021, netting Leeds' second in their 2–0 victory over Crystal Palace.

Bamford ended the season with 17 league goals (joint-fourth with Son Heung-min, behind Bruno Fernandes, Mohamed Salah and the season's top scorer, Harry Kane), his highest career goal return since scoring 17 goals with Middlesbrough during the 2014–15 season in the Championship, and the first player to score as many goals for a newly promoted side since Charlie Austin scored 18 goals for Queens Park Rangers in the 2014–15 season. Bamford played in all 38 league fixtures, starting almost every game, with Bielsa occasionally bringing on Tyler Roberts as a tactical substitute for him in the first few weeks of the season, and Rodrigo proving to be a prolifically goal-scoring substitute for Bamford in the season's final fixtures.

==== 2021–22 season ====
On 19 August 2021, Bamford signed a new five-year contract with Leeds. He scored his first goal of the season on 29 August with an 86th-minute equaliser in a 1–1 draw at Burnley. However, a 17 September ankle injury in a 1–1 draw at Newcastle United, a game in which Luke Ayling also suffered a knee injury, saw Bamford sidelined into November while a variety of forwards, including Rodrigo, Raphinha and Joe Gelhardt were tried in various combinations. In his 5 December return game, where he came on as a 68th-minute substitute for Junior Firpo, Bamford netted the 95th-minute equaliser in a 2–2 home draw with Brentford. Coincidentally, the Brentford tie also marked Ayling's return, and the defender provided the assist for Bamford. However, the striker injured his hip in the post-goal celebration, which ruled him out for the remainder of December's games and in January 2022 he suffered sole of the foot issues and did not play any games that month or February either.

On 5 March, Bamford made his return to the bench as an unused substitute in Jesse Marsch's first game in charge (a 1–0 defeat at the King Power Stadium), the striker's first time named in the squad since December, and on 10 March he came on as a 58th-minute substitute for Jack Harrison. Three days later, Bamford started his first game in almost six months — in Leeds's dramatic 2–1 win at Elland Road against Norwich City — before being substituted by Robin Koch in the 60th minute. However, his start in the game on 18 March at Molineux saw him in visible pain from the whistle and led to him being substituted for Sam Greenwood in the 23rd minute. In a wide-ranging interview with BBC Radio Leeds on 9 April 2022, following his re-injury against Wolves, he spoke of the injuries he had suffered during his blighted season, specifically the Wolves game:

[W]hen Jesse came in, knew the situation with my foot, I was like a couple of weeks from getting back involved … I knew, when I'd spoken to the specialists and stuff, that a tear in the plantar fascia doesn't ever really heal, so the heel is painful the whole time and just walking day-to-day was agony ... So I was like: 'I want to play – the team needs me, I'm going to try,' and even before the Wolves game I knew that I wasn't quite right and in the warmup I should've just stopped … and then there was full movement in the game and with each one I was like, 'I can't run here,' really struggling, and then the last one just fully tore and I knew it.

Bamford made no further appearances for Leeds in the 2021–22 season, although he was in contention in the lineup for the crucial, final game of the season when he was stricken with a bad case of Covid.

==== 2022–23 season ====
Bamford's litany of injuries continued into the new season: in his 13 August game at Southampton, he was substituted by Dan James in the first half with an adductor injury and in the eight subsequent appearances he made, he started only two of them, remaining on the pitch for just over an hour in both cases.

In Leeds' 2–1 defeat away to Aston Villa on 13 January 2023, Bamford came off the bench, making an appearance for the first time since groin surgery in October, to score Leeds' only goal of the game, his 100th career goal and his first in any competition since December 2021.

Handed the captain's armband when he came in as a second-half replacement for Rodrigo, Bamford scored Leeds' fourth and fifth in their 5–2 win at Elland Road over Cardiff in the F.A. Cup third round replay on 18 January 2023.

==== 2023–24 season ====
With the arrival of Daniel Farke, Bamford found himself relegated to a substitute role in the new manager's lineup, behind preferred forwards Georginio Rutter, Daniel James, Joël Piroe and Crysencio Summerville, with Bamford making just seven goalless second-half appearances in the first 14 league games, most frequently for Rutter and James. On 1 January 2024 he netted his first goal of the season in a home league tie against Birmingham City, nodding in a header from close range, following a delivery from Daniel James. On 7 January Bamford started his second consecutive match and scored his second goal of the season, in a 3–0 win against Peterborough in the FA Cup. The goal was a spectacular volley into the top corner, having initially controlled a long pass down onto his chest. It was described in the media as a "belter" and "wondergoal".

Bamford incurred an end-of-season knee injury which ruled him out of contention for the Championship playoff semi-finals against Norwich.

==== 2024–25 season ====
Despite the transfer of Rutter and Summerville in the summer of 2024 to Premier League clubs Brighton & Hove Albion and West Ham United respectively, Bamford commenced another season as Farke's centre-forward selection behind Mateo Joseph and Piroe, as well as newcomer Largie Ramazani. Apart from appearing in the starting eleven in Leeds' League Cup appearance, Bamford continued to find himself coming on as a late substitute in Championship league games through December 2024. After one appearance on New Year's Day, a hamstring injury kept him out of the first team in 2025 until three substitute appearances in April and he finished the season without a single league start, usually coming on as a late replacement for Piroe or Gnonto.

==== 2025–26 season ====
Having been absent from Leeds United's first pre-season friendly against Manchester United, Daniel Farke announced Bamford was not part of his plans for the upcoming season. On 28 August 2025, Leeds United announced that an agreement had been reached with Bamford which would see the striker leave the club by mutual consent.

=== Sheffield United ===
On 13 November 2025, Bamford signed a short-term deal with EFL Championship side Sheffield United. He was named EFL Championship Player of the Month for December after a run of four goals in six matches. On 11 January 2026, he signed a new eighteen-month contract with the club.

== International career ==
Bamford played for the Republic of Ireland once at under-18 level, as he qualifies to play for Ireland under the grandparent rule. On 28 February 2012, Bamford made his first appearance for the England under-19s in a friendly against the Czech Republic. He was brought on at half time and 20 minutes into the second half Chelsea teammate Todd Kane put a cross into the box which Bamford firmly headed into the goal, scoring his first England under-19 goal. On 17 November 2013, he was called up to the England under-21 team for the first time for a game against San Marino under-21s after a fantastic start to the season, having scored 12 goals in 20 appearances. Two days later, Bamford made his under-21s debut, coming on as a 65th-minute substitute in a 9–0 win over San Marino.

Bamford was included in Gareth Southgate's 27-man preliminary squad for the 2015 UEFA European Under-21 Championship, but was excluded from the final squad due to injury.

In March and July 2018, Republic of Ireland manager Martin O'Neill revealed he and assistant manager Roy Keane had been scouting Bamford, as they were looking into the possibility of calling him up to the Republic of Ireland squad, should the striker change allegiance back to the Ireland national team. On 23 December 2018, new Republic of Ireland manager Mick McCarthy confirmed he would be speaking to Bamford about calling him up to the national team, and on 7 March 2019 McCarthy claimed that Bamford would be switching his allegiance back to Ireland. McCarthy said in June 2019 that he was still waiting for Bamford to make a decision about playing for Ireland, saying that he was "refusing to chase" him with former Leeds and Republic of Ireland striker Robbie Keane saying: "He should be chasing us. He should want to come here. If he doesn't want to, no problem. We shouldn't be chasing people, by the way."

In October 2020, Bamford said in an interview that it "would be a dream [come true]" to play for England and make the England squad for UEFA Euro 2020 (later postponed until 2021 due to the COVID-19 pandemic). He also said that he would aim to make the squad but was not named as one of Gareth Southgate's squad of 26 players, nor his provisional 33-player-squad, announced on 25 May 2021.

In August 2021, Bamford was called up for the England national team for the first time ahead of September's 2022 FIFA World Cup qualifiers against Hungary, Andorra and Poland. His debut came against Andorra on 5 September 2021, where he started and played 62 minutes of the 4–0 victory at Wembley Stadium (he was not named for the game against Hungary, but was an unused substitute in the Poland game in Warsaw on 8 September).

== Style of play ==
Bamford is a versatile forward, who can play as a lone striker or in a pair, and can also play on either wing. He is known for his technique and ability on the ball and his delivery of assists, as well as his proficiency in the air. Although deployed as a solitary striker, Bamford also provided one of the highest rates of assists for a player in his position in the Premier League.

Preferring to let the ball run and delivering a strike as his first touch, the vast majority of Bamford's goals, and all of his penalties, are scored with his left foot, although he scores extensively with his head and, to a lesser extent, his right foot.

== Personal life ==
Bamford became a father in 2022. He married his long time partner Michaela Ireland on 7 June 2024 at Grantley Hall, Ripon.

== Career statistics ==
=== Club ===
As of match played 24 October 2026

Appearances and goals by club, season and competition
Club	Season	League			FA Cup		League Cup		Europe		Other		Total	
Club	Season	Division	Apps	Goals	Apps	Goals	Apps	Goals	Apps	Goals	Apps	Goals	Apps	Goals
Nottingham Forest	2011–12	Championship	2	0	0	0	0	0	—		—		2	0
Chelsea	2011–12	Premier League	0	0	0	0	—		0	0	—		0	0
Chelsea	2012–13	Premier League	0	0	—		0	0	0	0	0	0	0	0
Chelsea	2014–15	Premier League	0	0	—		—		—		—		0	0
Chelsea	2015–16	Premier League	0	0	0	0	—		—		—		0	0
Chelsea	2016–17	Premier League	0	0	—		0	0	—		—		0	0
Chelsea	Total		0	0	0	0	0	0	0	0	0	0	0	0
Milton Keynes Dons (loan)	2012–13	League One	14	4	—		—		—		—		14	4
Milton Keynes Dons (loan)	2013–14	League One	23	14	3	1	2	1	—		2 (Note: Appearances in Football League Trophy)	1	30	17
Milton Keynes Dons (loan)	Total		37	18	3	1	2	1	0	0	2	1	44	21
Derby County (loan)	2013–14	Championship	21	8	—		—		—		2 (Note: Appearance(s) in Championship play-offs)	0	23	8
Middlesbrough (loan)	2014–15	Championship	38	17	3	1	1	1	—		2	0	44	19
Crystal Palace (loan)	2015–16	Premier League	6	0	—		3	0	—		—		9	0
Norwich City (loan)	2015–16	Premier League	7	0	—		—		—		—		7	0
Burnley (loan)	2016–17	Premier League	6	0	0	0	—		—		—		6	0
Middlesbrough	2016–17	Premier League	8	1	1	0	—		—		—		9	1
Middlesbrough	2017–18	Championship	39	11	1	0	2	2	—		2	0	44	13
Middlesbrough	Total		47	12	2	0	2	2	—		2	0	53	14
Leeds United	2018–19	Championship	22	9	0	0	2	1	—		1	0	25	10
Leeds United	2019–20	Championship	45	16	1	0	1	0	—		—		47	16
Leeds United	2020–21	Premier League	38	17	0	0	0	0	—		—		38	17
Leeds United	2021–22	Premier League	9	2	0	0	1	0	—		—		10	2
Leeds United	2022–23	Premier League	28	4	3	2	0	0	—		—		31	6
Leeds United	2023–24	Championship	33	8	3	1	0	0	—		0	0	36	9
Leeds United	2024–25	Championship	17	0	0	0	1	0	—		—		18	0
Leeds United	Total		192	56	7	3	5	1	—		1	0	205	60
Sheffield United	2025–26	Championship	28	12	1	1	—		—		—		29	13
Sheffield United	2026–27	Championship	11	5	0	0	2	1	—		—		13	6
Sheffield United	Total		39	17	1	1	2	1	—		0	0	42	19
Career total			395	128	16	6	15	6	0	0	9	1	435	141

=== International ===
Appearances and goals by national team and year
National team	Year	Apps	Goals
England	2021	1	0
Total		1	0

== Honours ==
Leeds United

- EFL Championship: 2019–20, 2024–25

Individual

- EFL Championship Player of the Month: December 2025
- Football League One Player of the Month: October 2013
- Football League Young Player of the Month: December 2013
- Football League Championship Player of the Year: 2014–15
