= Bailey Peacock-Farrell =

Northern Ireland footballer (born 1996)

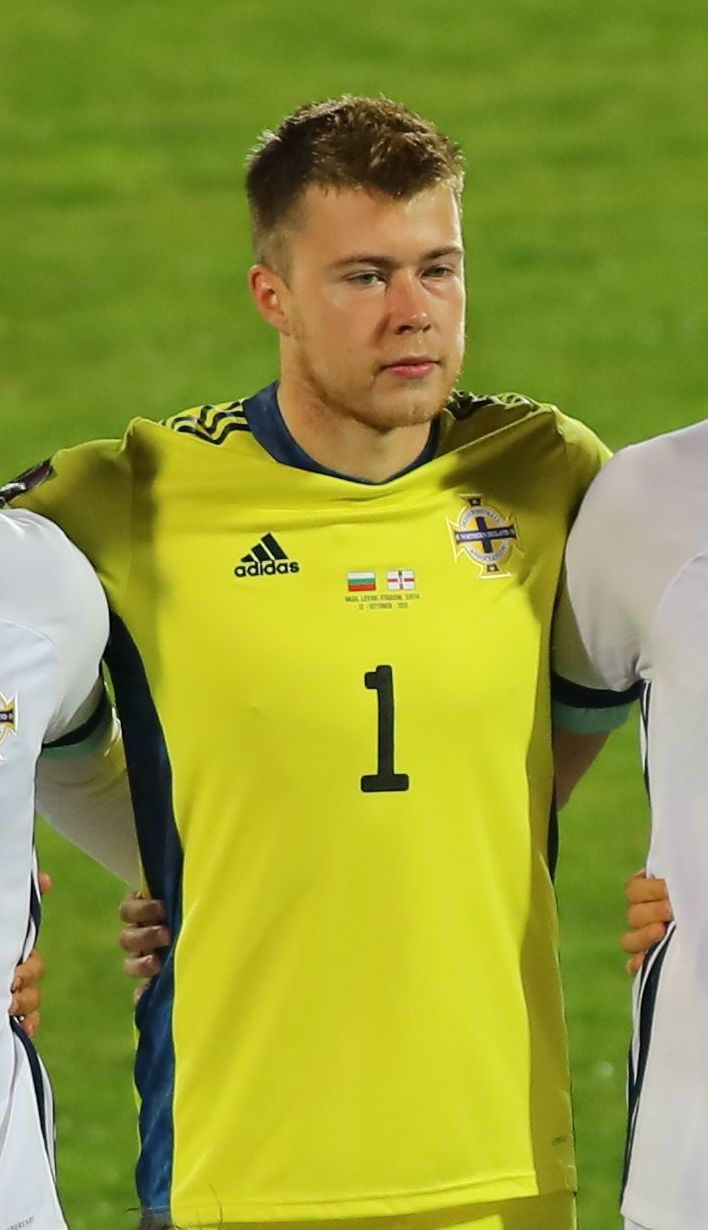
- Peacock-Farrell in 2021

Personal information
- Full name: Bailey Peacock-Farrell
- Date of birth: 29 October 1996 (age 30)
- Place of birth: Darlington, England
- Height: 6 ft 4 in (1.93 m)
- Position: Goalkeeper

Team information
- Current team: Blackpool
- Number: 1

Youth career
- 2006–2013: Middlesbrough
- 2013–2015: Leeds United

Senior career*
Years	Team	Apps	(Gls)
2015–2019	Leeds United	40	(0)
2017	→ York City (loan)	4	(0)
2019–2024	Burnley	12	(0)
2021–2022	→ Sheffield Wednesday (loan)	43	(0)
2023–2024	→ AGF (loan)	21	(0)
2024–2026	Birmingham City	9	(0)
2025–2026	→ Blackpool (loan)	26	(0)
2026–	Blackpool	16	(0)

International career^{‡}
2018	Northern Ireland U21	1	(0)
2018–	Northern Ireland	53	(0)
- * Club domestic league appearances and goals as of 16:22, 12 May 2026 (UTC) ‡ National team caps and goals as of 13 October 2025

Bailey Peacock-Farrell (born 29 October 1996) is a professional footballer who plays as a goalkeeper for EFL League One club Blackpool. Born in England, he plays for the Northern Ireland national team.

Peacock-Farrell played in Middlesbrough's youth system before signing for Leeds United in 2013. He signed his first professional contract in June 2015 and made his first-team debut in April 2016. He went on loan to National League North club York City in October 2017. He broke into the Leeds first team late into the 2017–18 season and made his debut for the Northern Ireland national team in May 2018. He started the 2018–19 season as Leeds' first-choice goalkeeper before losing his place to Kiko Casilla in January 2019. He signed for Premier League club Burnley in August 2019. He spent the 2021–22 on loan at League One club Sheffield Wednesday.

== Club career ==
=== Leeds United ===
==== Early career ====
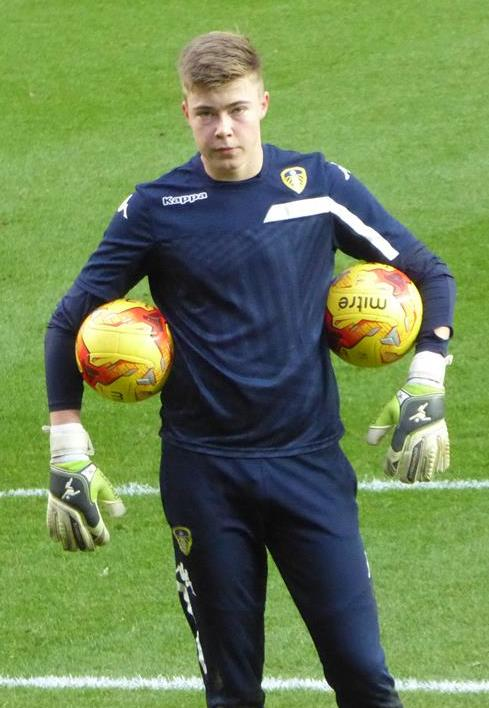
Peacock-Farrell warming up for Leeds United in 2015

Peacock-Farrell was born in Darlington, County Durham. He started his career in Middlesbrough's youth system in 2006 before being released in 2013, when the club chose not to offer him a scholarship. He joined Leeds United shortly after and signed his first professional contract with the club in June 2015. Following Marco Silvestri's dismissal in an away match against Rotherham United on 2 April 2016, He made his first-team debut in a Championship match at home to Queens Park Rangers on 5 April. The match finished a 1–1 draw, in which he conceded an 87th-minute penalty kick. He signed a new two-year contract at Leeds on 9 June. In October, he was ruled out with injury, after surgery on a broken hand.

Peacock-Farrell signed a new three-year contract at Leeds on 9 July 2017. He joined League One club Oldham Athletic on trial for the beginning of pre-season with the view to a season-long loan move, although Oldham decided not to take up the option. He returned to pre-season with Leeds, competing with Andy Lonergan and Felix Wiedwald. He joined National League North club York City on 12 October on a one-month loan. He made his debut two days later in a 2–2 draw away to Leamington. He made four appearances for York, in which he conceded nine goals, returning to Leeds once the loan expired. He joined Swedish Superettan club Landskrona BoIS on a three-day trial in January 2018. After training and playing an internal friendly match for the team, Landskrona decided not to sign him.

Nearly two years after making his debut, Peacock-Farrell played his second match for Leeds on 7 March 2018 at home to league leaders Wolverhampton Wanderers, with first-choice goalkeeper Wiedwald dropped due to poor form. Leeds lost 3–0, but Peacock-Farrell received the man-of-the-match award for his performance. He retained his place in the team for the following matches and became Leeds' first-choice goalkeeper for the remainder of the 2017–18 season. He put in several man-of-the-match performances, including a 1–0 defeat against Aston Villa, after which Dan Long of Sky Sports wrote that Peacock-Farrell "looks incredibly assured between the sticks, particularly astounding given his age". In May, Peacock-Farrell won the Young Player of the Year award at Leeds' annual award ceremony. He finished the season with eleven appearances for Leeds as they finished in 13th place in the 2017–18 Championship.

==== 2018–19 ====
After beating off competition from new signing Jamal Blackman, Peacock-Farrell started the 2018–19 season in goal under new head coach Marcelo Bielsa. His understudy Blackman returned to parent club Chelsea with an injury in November, leaving Peacock-Farrell as Leeds' only senior goalkeeper. After Bielsa publicly revealed that Peacock-Farrell would have been dropped the following match had Blackman not been injured, Peacock-Farrell became the match winner on 27 November, saving a 90th-minute penalty against Reading to help Leeds to a 1–0 win.

Leeds signed goalkeeper Kiko Casilla from Real Madrid on 17 January 2019 to compete with Peacock-Farrell for a starting place. He dropped to the bench against Rotherham United on 26 January, with Casilla establishing himself as the club's first-choice goalkeeper. Bielsa stated that he believed that taking Peacock-Farrell out of first-team action would help his development. However, he did return for a single match later in the season on 30 March, for the suspended Casilla, in a 3–2 home win over Millwall. Leeds qualified for the play-offs with a third-place finish in the 2018–19 Championship, and Peacock-Farrell was an unused substitute in both legs of the semi-final as Leeds were beaten 4–3 on aggregated by Derby County. During the 2018–19 season, Peacock-Farrell made 29 appearances in all competitions.

In June 2019, Peacock-Farrell revealed he had turned down the option of starting pre-season training a week later after featuring on international duty for Northern Ireland, in order to compete for the goalkeeping position with Casilla. Peacock-Farrell had previously stated that he would be reluctant to sign a new contract with Leeds should he continue to be second choice in goal. However, assurances of a first-team place were not forthcoming as the 2019–20 season approached, with Casilla still preferred in goal by Bielsa.

=== Burnley ===
Peacock-Farrell signed for Premier League club Burnley on 2 August 2019 on a four-year contract with the option of a further year for an undisclosed fee, reported by BBC Sport as £2.5 million. He was signed to provide competition with Joe Hart and Nick Pope after the departure of Tom Heaton. On 28 November 2020, Peacock-Farrell made his league debut for Burnley in 5–0 away defeat against Manchester City.

Peacock-Farrell joined Sheffield Wednesday on 27 July 2021 on a season-long loan. He made his debut on 1 August 2021, at home to Huddersfield Town in the first round of the 2021–22 EFL Cup, keeping a clean sheet in a 0–0 draw after extra time, although the team would eventually lose in a penalty shoot-out. He would become the first ever goalkeeper for Sheffield Wednesday not to concede in the opening five games of the season, keeping clean sheets against Huddersfield Town, Charlton Athletic, Doncaster Rovers, Fleetwood Town and Rotherham United, including a spectacular penalty save in the later game. He was named the club's Player of the Month for August, as well as being nominated by the EFL for Player of the Month for August. He won Wednesday's Player of the Month again for December.

Peacock-Farrell went on loan to Danish team AGF Aarhus for the 2023–24 season, joining up with former manager Uwe Rosler. On 21 May 2024, Burnley said it had activated a contract extension for the player.

=== Birmingham City ===
On 30 June 2024, Peacock-Farrell joined recently relegated EFL League One club Birmingham City for an undisclosed fee; he signed a four-year contract. Neither he nor fellow new arrival Ryan Allsop took squad number 1, and both indicated they would support each other whoever was chosen for the first team. Peacock-Farrell started the opening league fixture, a 1–1 draw at home to Reading.

=== Blackpool ===
On 18 July 2025, Peacock-Farrell moved to League One club Blackpool on a season-long loan. The move was turned permanent on 30 January 2026, on a contract until the end of the season.

== International career ==
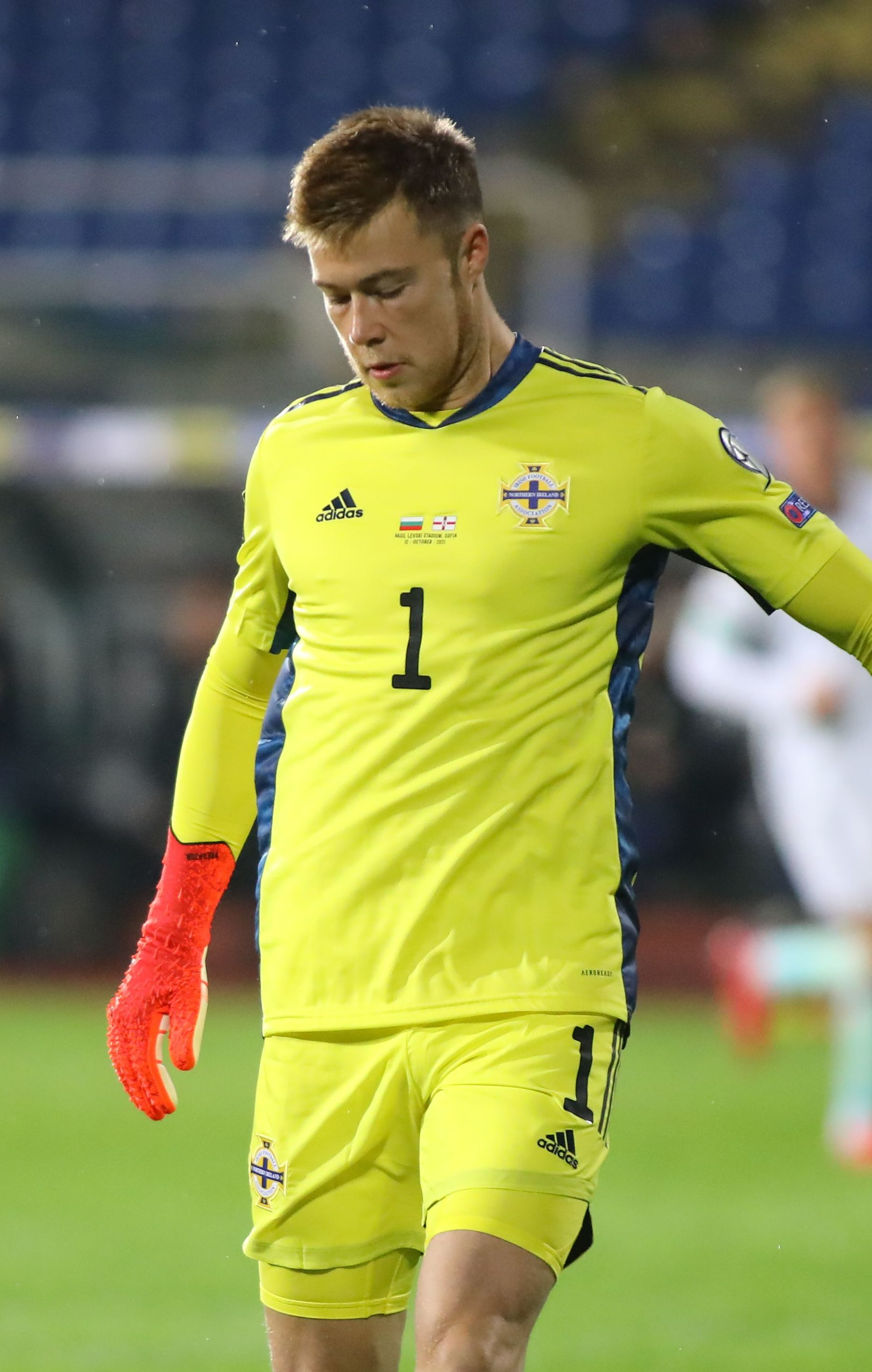
Peacock-Farrell playing for Northern Ireland in 2021

Peacock-Farrell qualified for Northern Ireland as his grandfather, Jim Farrell, was from Enniskillen. He was called up to the Northern Ireland national team in May 2017 for a training camp. In August, he was called up for 2018 FIFA World Cup qualification matches against San Marino and Czech Republic. He was called up the Northern Ireland U21 squad in March 2018 by manager Ian Baraclough for their matches against Spain and Iceland in 2019 UEFA European Under-21 Championship qualification. He made his debut on 26 March, keeping a clean sheet as Northern Ireland played out a 0–0 draw with Iceland.

Peacock-Farrell was named in the Northern Ireland squad in May 2018 ahead of friendlies against Panama and Costa Rica. He made his debut on 30 May against Panama as a half-time substitute in a 0–0 draw. Peacock-Farrell revealed in September that he had been approached by members of the England national team staff about the possibility of changing his allegiance, which he would be able to do since he had not yet made his competitive debut for Northern Ireland. Peacock-Farrell, however, affirmed his wish to represent Northern Ireland, who had shown interest in him at an early stage. He made his competitive debut for Northern Ireland on 8 September, starting in a 2–1 home defeat to Bosnia and Herzegovina in the 2018–19 UEFA Nations League.

In September 2025, he became the third goalkeeper, behind Pat Jennings and Maik Taylor, to win fifty caps for Northern Ireland.

== Career statistics ==
=== Club ===
As of end of 2025–26 season

Appearances and goals by club, season and competition
Club	Season	League			National cup (Note: Includes FA Cup, Danish Cup)		League cup (Note: Includes EFL Cup)		Other		Total	
Club	Season	Division	Apps	Goals	Apps	Goals	Apps	Goals	Apps	Goals	Apps	Goals
Leeds United	2015–16	Championship	1	0	0	0	0	0	—		1	0
Leeds United	2016–17	Championship	0	0	0	0	0	0	—		0	0
Leeds United	2017–18	Championship	11	0	0	0	0	0	—		11	0
Leeds United	2018–19	Championship	28	0	1	0	0	0	0	0	29	0
Leeds United	Total		40	0	1	0	0	0	0	0	41	0
York City (loan)	2017–18	National League North	4	0	—		—		—		4	0
Burnley	2019–20	Premier League	0	0	0	0	0	0	—		0	0
Burnley	2020–21	Premier League	4	0	2	0	2	0	—		8	0
Burnley	2021–22	Premier League	0	0	0	0	0	0	–		0	0
Burnley	2022–23	Championship	8	0	5	0	3	0	—		16	0
Burnley	2023–24	Premier League	0	0	0	0	0	0	–		0	0
Burnley	Total		12	0	7	0	5	0	—		24	0
Sheffield Wednesday (loan)	2021–22	League One	43	0	1	0	1	0	2 (Note: Appearance in League One play-offs)	0	47	0
AGF (loan)	2023–24	Danish Superliga	21	0	6	0	—		1 (Note: Appearance in UEFA Europa Conference League)	0	28	0
Birmingham City	2024–25	League One	9	0	3	0	0	0	4 (Note: Appearances in EFL Trophy)	0	16	0
Birmingham City	2025–26	Championship	0	0	0	0	0	0	–		0	0
Birmingham City	Total		9	0	3	0	0	0	4	0	16	0
Blackpool (loan)	2025–26	League One	26	0	3	0	1	0	0	0	30	0
Blackpool	2025–26	League One	16	0	–		–		–		16	0
Blackpool	2026-27	League One	8	0	0	0	2	0	0	0	10	0
Career total			171	0	21	0	7	0	7	0	206	0

=== International ===
As of match played 14 November 2025

Appearances and goals by national team and year
National team	Year	Apps	Goals
Northern Ireland	2018	5	0
Northern Ireland	2019	9	0
Northern Ireland	2020	5	0
Northern Ireland	2021	10	0
Northern Ireland	2022	6	0
Northern Ireland	2023	7	0
Northern Ireland	2024	6	0
Northern Ireland	2025	5	0
Total		53	0

== Honours ==
Burnley

- EFL Championship: 2022–23

Birmingham City

- EFL League One: 2024–25
- EFL Trophy runner-up: 2024–25

Individual

- Leeds United Young Player of the Year: 2017–18
