= Mawene =

Mawene is a Samoan or Congolese name. Notable people with the surname include:

== Given name ==
- Mawene Hiroti (born 1999), New Zealand rugby league footballer

== Surname ==
- Samy-Oyame Mawene (born 1984), French footballer
- Noah Mawene (born 2005), English footballer
- Theo Mawene (born 2007), English footballer
- Youl Mawéné (born 1979), French footballer
