= 2024–25 EFL Cup =

English football tournament season

Carabao Cup
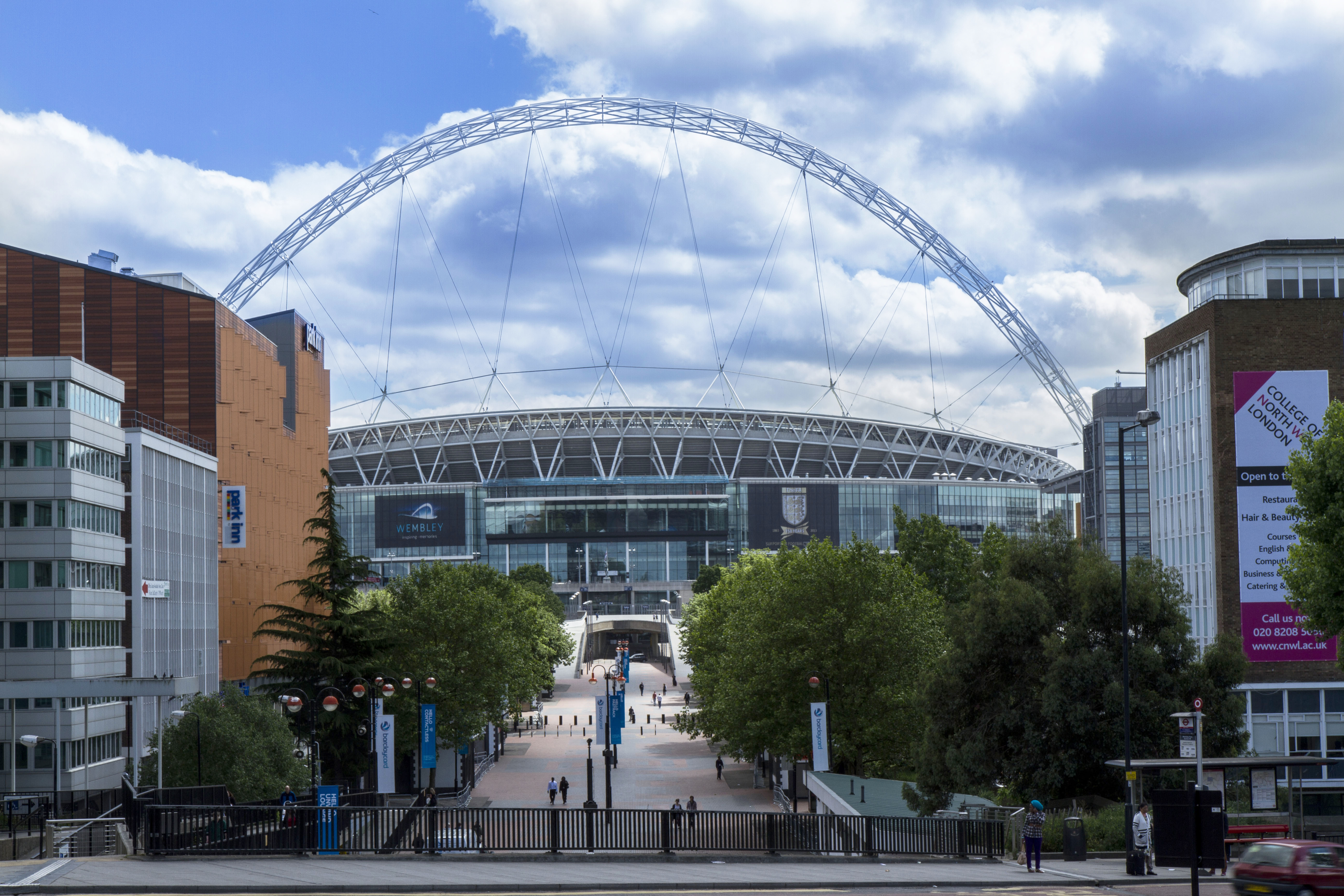
- Wembley Stadium hosted the final

Tournament details
- Country: England; Wales
- Dates: 13 August 2024 – 16 March 2025
- Teams: 92

Final positions
- Champions: Newcastle United (1st title)
- Runners-up: Liverpool

Tournament statistics
- Matches played: 93
- Goals scored: 300 (3.23 per match)
- Attendance: 1,793,877 (19,289 per match)
- Top goal scorer(s): Cody Gakpo (5 goals)

The 2024–25 EFL Cup was the 65th season of the English Football League Cup. It was sponsored by Carabao Energy Drink and known as the Carabao Cup for sponsorship reasons. The EFL Cup was open to all clubs participating in the Premier League and the English Football League.

The winner of the competition qualified for the play-off round of the 2025–26 UEFA Conference League.

Liverpool were the defending champions, having beaten Chelsea in the previous season's final. They were beaten in this season's final by Newcastle United, who won their first EFL Cup and a first domestic trophy since the 1954–55 FA Cup.

== Teams ==
All 92 clubs in the Premier League and English Football League entered the season's EFL Cup. Access was distributed across the top 4 leagues of the English football league system.

In the first round, 22 of 24 Championship clubs, and all League One and League Two clubs entered.

The following round, the two remaining Championship clubs, who finished 18th and 19th in the 2023–24 Premier League season (Luton Town and Burnley), and the Premier League clubs not involved in either the Champions League, Europa League or Conference League entered.

	Clubs entering in this round	Clubs advancing from previous round	Number of games	Main date
First round (70 clubs)	24 clubs from EFL League Two; 24 clubs from EFL League One; 22 clubs from EFL Championship	N/A	35	13 August 2024
Second round (50 clubs)	2 clubs from EFL Championship; 13 Premier League clubs (not involved in European competitions)	35 winners from first round	25	27 August 2024
Third round (32 clubs)	7 Premier League clubs (involved in European competitions)	25 winners from second round	16	17 September 2024; 24 September 2024
Fourth round (16 clubs)	—N/a	16 winners from third round	8	30 October 2024
Quarter-finals (8 clubs)	—N/a	8 winners from fourth round	4	18 December 2024
Semi-finals (4 clubs)	—N/a	4 winners from quarter-finals	4 (two-legged)	6 January 2025; 3 February 2025
Final (2 clubs)	—N/a	2 winners from semi-finals	1	16 March 2025

== First round ==
A total of 70 teams played in the first round: 24 from League Two (tier 4), 24 from League One (tier 3), and 22 from the Championship (tier 2). The draw for this round was split on a geographical basis into "northern" and "southern" sections, where teams were drawn against a team from the same section. The draw was made on 27 June 2024 by Frank Sinclair and Gary McAllister.

Number of teams per tier still in the competition
Premier League (Note: Premier League teams joined the competition in the second and third rounds.)	Championship (Note: Two Championship teams joined the competition in the second round.)	League One	League Two	Total
20 / 20	24 / 24	24 / 24	24 / 24	92 / 92

=== Northern section ===
13 August 2024	Carlisle United (4)	0–2	Stoke City (2)	Carlisle
19:30 BST		Report	Anderson 48'; Tezgel 79'	Stadium: Brunton Park; Attendance: 4,441; Referee: Ben Toner

13 August 2024	Stockport County (3)	1–6	Blackburn Rovers (2)	Stockport
19:30 BST	Buckley 67' (o.g.)	Report	Szmodics 8', 25'; Weimann 22'; Ohashi 31'; Gueye 72'; Vale 88'	Stadium: Edgeley Park; Attendance: 5,790; Referee: Ross Joyce

13 August 2024	Barrow (4)	3–2	Port Vale (4)	Barrow-in-Furness
19:45 BST	Garner 1'; Acquah 70'; Jackson 76'	Report	Paton 26'; Sang 66'	Stadium: Holker Street; Attendance: 1,711; Referee: Scott Jackson

13 August 2024	Bolton Wanderers (3)	1–1 (5–4 p)	Mansfield Town (3)	Bolton
19:45 BST	Thomason 68'	Report	Keillor-Dunn 83'	Stadium: Toughsheet Community Stadium; Attendance: 4,131; Referee: Adam Herczeg
	Penalties
	Adeboyejo (penalty scored); Thomason (penalty missed); Collins (penalty scored); Williams (penalty missed); Charles (penalty scored); Matete (penalty scored); Dacres-Cogley (penalty scored)		(penalty scored) Bowery; (penalty scored) Gregory; (penalty scored) Hewitt; (penalty missed) Boateng; (penalty missed) Lewis; (penalty scored) Macdonald; (penalty missed) Swan

13 August 2024	Burton Albion (3)	0–4	Blackpool (3)	Burton upon Trent
19:45 BST		Report	Finnigan 69'; Pennington 76', 81'; Evans 90+1'	Stadium: Pirelli Stadium; Attendance: 1,522; Referee: Matt Corlett

13 August 2024	Derby County (2)	2–1	Chesterfield (4)	Derby
19:45 BST	Thompson 38'; Jackson 68'	Report	Dobra 29'	Stadium: Pride Park Stadium; Attendance: 8,538; Referee: Leigh Doughty

13 August 2024	Fleetwood Town (4)	2–1	West Bromwich Albion (2)	Fleetwood
19:45 BST	Graydon 12'; Coughlan 33'	Report	Faal 8'	Stadium: Highbury Stadium; Attendance: 2,611; Referee: Thomas Kirk

13 August 2024	Grimsby Town (4)	1–1 (9–8 p)	Bradford City (4)	Cleethorpes
19:45 BST	Wilson 36'	Report	Cook 76'	Stadium: Blundell Park; Attendance: 3,082; Referee: David Coote
	Penalties
	Green (penalty missed); Davies (penalty scored); Vernam (penalty scored); Cass (penalty scored); Gardner (penalty scored); Ainley (penalty scored); Eastwood (penalty scored); McJannet (penalty scored); Khouri (penalty scored); McEachran (penalty scored)		(penalty scored) Smallwood; (penalty missed) Halliday; (penalty scored) Oduor; (penalty scored) Sarcevic; (penalty scored) Cook; (penalty scored) Young; (penalty scored) Baldwin; (penalty scored) Shepherd; (penalty scored) Pointon; (penalty missed) Byrne

13 August 2024	Huddersfield Town (3)	3–0	Morecambe (4)	Huddersfield
19:45 BST	Headley 1'; Marshall 38'; Ward 43'	Report		Stadium: Kirklees Stadium; Attendance: 5,111; Referee: Simon Mather

13 August 2024	Lincoln City (3)	1–2	Harrogate Town (4)	Lincoln
19:45 BST	Makama 85' (pen.)	Report	Folarin 49'; J. Daly 61'	Stadium: Sincil Bank; Attendance: 3,507; Referee: Scott Tallis

13 August 2024	Preston North End (2)	2–0	Sunderland (2)	Preston
19:45 BST	Ledson 37'; Frøkjær-Jensen 72'	Report		Stadium: Deepdale; Attendance: 7,231; Referee: Ollie Yates

13 August 2024	Rotherham United (3)	2–1	Crewe Alexandra (4)	Rotherham
19:45 BST	Nombe 55'; Odoffin 86'	Report	Holíček 50'	Stadium: New York Stadium; Attendance: 2,182; Referee: Scott Oldham

13 August 2024	Salford City (4)	0–2	Doncaster Rovers (4)	Salford
19:45 BST		Report	Sharp 21'; Molyneux 90+1'	Stadium: Moor Lane; Attendance: 1,328; Referee: Seb Stockbridge

13 August 2024	Shrewsbury Town (3)	3–3 (4–3 p)	Notts County (4)	Shrewsbury
19:45 BST	Kayode 68'; Shipley 71', 84'	Report	Grant 4'; Austin 23'; Jatta 89'	Stadium: New Meadow; Attendance: 2,914; Referee: Ben Speedie
	Penalties
	Shipley (penalty scored); Biggins (penalty missed); Lloyd (penalty scored); Bloxham (penalty scored); Benning (penalty scored)		(penalty missed) McGoldrick; (penalty scored) Crowley; (penalty missed) Edwards; (penalty scored) Scott; (penalty scored) Jatta

13 August 2024	Tranmere Rovers (4)	3–0	Accrington Stanley (4)	Birkenhead
19:45 BST	Saunders 3'; Williams 45'; Patrick 71'	Report		Stadium: Prenton Park; Attendance: 2,288; Referee: Scott Simpson

13 August 2024	Wigan Athletic (3)	1–1 (2–4 p)	Barnsley (3)	Wigan
19:45 BST	Aasgaard 35' (pen.)	Report	Pines 48'	Stadium: Brick Community Stadium; Attendance: 1,990; Referee: Will Finnie
	Penalties
	Aasgaard (penalty missed); Jones (penalty scored); Stones (penalty missed); McHugh (penalty scored)		(penalty scored) Phillips; (penalty missed) Connell; (penalty scored) Earl; (penalty scored) Watters; (penalty scored) Russell

13 August 2024	Sheffield United (2)	4–2	Wrexham (3)	Sheffield
20:00 BST	Trusty 35'; Brunt 57' (o.g.); Marsh 69'; Ben Slimane 85'	Report	Boyle 29'; Revan 90+5'	Stadium: Bramall Lane; Attendance: 11,446; Referee: Keith Stroud

14 August 2024	Hull City (2)	1–2	Sheffield Wednesday (2)	Kingston upon Hull
19:45 BST	Mehlem 9'	Report	McNeill 1', 10'	Stadium: MKM Stadium; Attendance: 9,281; Referee: Tom Nield

14 August 2024	Leeds United (2)	0–3	Middlesbrough (2)	Leeds
20:00 BST		Report	Dijksteel 50'; Burgzorg 60'; Coburn 67'	Stadium: Elland Road; Attendance: 35,150; Referee: Anthony Backhouse

=== Southern section ===
13 August 2024	Leyton Orient (3)	4–1	Newport County (4)	Leyton
19:30 BST	Agyei 1'; Jaiyesimi 45+7'; Cooper 51'; Kelman 74'	Report	Clarke 61'	Stadium: Brisbane Road; Attendance: 2,141; Referee: Craig Hicks

13 August 2024	Bristol City (2)	0–1	Coventry City (2)	Bristol
19:45 BST		Report	Simms 65'	Stadium: Ashton Gate; Attendance: 10,940; Referee: James Bell

13 August 2024	Bromley (4)	1–2	AFC Wimbledon (4)	Bromley
19:45 BST	Amantchi 19'	Report	Kelly 24'; Pigott 61'	Stadium: Hayes Lane; Attendance: 3,677; Referee: Carl Brook

13 August 2024	Cambridge United (3)	1–2	Queens Park Rangers (2)	Cambridge
19:45 BST	Digby 57'	Report	Frey 13'; Smyth 36'	Stadium: Abbey Stadium; Attendance: 4,529; Referee: Paul Howard

13 August 2024	Cardiff City (2)	2–0	Bristol Rovers (3)	Cardiff
19:45 BST	McGuinness 68'; Colwill 90+1'	Report		Stadium: Cardiff City Stadium; Attendance: 5,718; Referee: Charles Breakspear

13 August 2024	Charlton Athletic (3)	0–1	Birmingham City (3)	Charlton
19:45 BST		Report	Khela 32'	Stadium: The Valley; Attendance: 5,899; Referee: Alex Chilowicz

13 August 2024	Colchester United (4)	2–2 (4–3 p)	Reading (3)	Colchester
19:45 BST	Hopper 3'; Payne 55' (pen.)	Report	Savage 65'; Wing 73'	Stadium: Colchester Community Stadium; Attendance: 3,123; Referee: Neil Hair
	Penalties
	Ihionvien (penalty scored); Read (penalty scored); Oni (penalty scored); Gordon (penalty scored)		(penalty scored) Wareham; (penalty missed) Ehibhatiomhan; (penalty scored) Bindon; (penalty scored) Wing; (penalty missed) Mbengue

13 August 2024	Crawley Town (3)	4–2	Swindon Town (4)	Crawley
19:45 BST	Adeyemo 34'; Roles 56', 88'; Khaleel 89'	Report	Ofoborh 60'; Smith 66'	Stadium: Broadfield Stadium; Attendance: 2,396; Referee: Ben Atkinson

13 August 2024	Northampton Town (3)	0–2	Wycombe Wanderers (3)	Northampton
19:45 BST		Report	Udoh 9'; Mbete 45+1' (o.g.)	Stadium: Sixfields Stadium; Attendance: 2,012; Referee: Declan Bourne

13 August 2024	Norwich City (2)	4–3	Stevenage (3)	Norwich
19:45 BST	Kamara 26'; Hernández 35', 60'; Sainz 48'	Report	Goode 28'; Appéré 45+1'; Hills 88' (o.g.)	Stadium: Carrow Road; Attendance: 13,054; Referee: Sunny Singh Gill

13 August 2024	Oxford United (2)	2–0	Peterborough United (3)	Oxford
19:45 BST	Goodrham 20'; Phillips 41'	Report		Stadium: Kassam Stadium; Attendance: 3,693; Referee: Geoff Eltringham

13 August 2024	Portsmouth (2)	0–1	Millwall (2)	Portsmouth
19:45 BST		Report	Esse 13'	Stadium: Fratton Park; Attendance: 13,913; Referee: Dean Whitestone

13 August 2024	Swansea City (2)	3–1	Gillingham (4)	Swansea
19:45 BST	Ronald 24'; Cullen 70'; Abdulai 90+6'	Report	Hawkins 87'	Stadium: Swansea.com Stadium; Attendance: 6,019; Referee: David Rock

13 August 2024	Walsall (4)	1–1 (4–3 p)	Exeter City (3)	Walsall
19:45 BST	Jellis 90+3'	Report	Alli 40'	Stadium: Bescot Stadium; Attendance: 2,352; Referee: Jacob Miles
	Penalties
	Earing (penalty missed); Okagbue (penalty scored); Matt (penalty scored); L. Gordon (penalty scored); J. Gordon (penalty scored)		(penalty scored) Magennis; (penalty missed) Niskanen; (penalty missed) Alli; (penalty scored) Fitzwater; (penalty scored) Aitchison

13 August 2024	Watford (2)	5–0	Milton Keynes Dons (4)	Watford
19:45 BST	Pollock 24'; Ince 45+1', 67', 74'; Baah 64'	Report		Stadium: Vicarage Road; Attendance: 6,885; Referee: Lewis Smith

14 August 2024	Plymouth Argyle (2)	3–0	Cheltenham Town (4)	Plymouth
19:45 BST	Waine 62'; Hardie 81'; Bundu 84'	Report		Stadium: Home Park; Attendance: 12,058; Referee: Tom Reeves

== Second round ==
A total of 50 teams played in the second round: the 13 Premier League clubs not involved in European competitions and the two best-ranked EFL Championship clubs (Luton Town and Burnley) entered at this stage along with the 35 winners from the first round. The draw for this round was split on a geographical basis into "northern" and "southern" sections, where teams were drawn against a team from the same section. The draw was made on 14 August 2024 by Jermaine Beckford and Curtis Davies.

Number of teams per tier still in the competition
Premier League (Note: The seven Premier League teams involved in European competitions joined the competition in the third round.)	Championship	League One	League Two	Total
20 / 20	18 / 24	10 / 24	9 / 24	57 / 92

=== Northern section ===
27 August 2024	Middlesbrough (2)	0–5	Stoke City (2)	Middlesbrough
19:15 BST		Report	Tezgel 14'; Mmaee 57'; Koumas 60'; Manhoef 65', 69'	Stadium: Riverside Stadium; Attendance: 17,408; Referee: Geoff Eltringham

27 August 2024	Barnsley (3)	1–0	Sheffield United (2)	Barnsley
19:45 BST	Watters 52'	Report		Stadium: Oakwell; Attendance: 10,739; Referee: Tom Reeves

27 August 2024	Barrow (4)	0–0 (3–2 p)	Derby County (2)	Barrow-in-Furness
19:45 BST		Report		Stadium: Holker Street; Attendance: 3,003; Referee: Seb Stockbridge
	Penalties
	Jackson (penalty scored); Gotts (penalty scored); Worrall (penalty scored); Spence (penalty missed)		(penalty missed) Collins; (penalty scored) Mendez-Laing; (penalty scored) Brown; (penalty missed) Jackson; (penalty missed) Forsyth

27 August 2024	Blackburn Rovers (2)	1–2	Blackpool (3)	Blackburn
19:45 BST	Gueye 21' (pen.)	Report	Beesley 72'; Coulson 77'	Stadium: Ewood Park; Attendance: 9,418; Referee: Anthony Backhouse

27 August 2024	Everton (1)	3–0	Doncaster Rovers (4)	Liverpool
19:45 BST	McNeil 53'; Ndiaye 74'; Beto 83'	Report		Stadium: Goodison Park; Attendance: 37,245; Referee: James Bell

27 August 2024	Fleetwood Town (4)	2–1	Rotherham United (3)	Fleetwood
19:45 BST	Graydon 16', 29'	Report	McCart 2'	Stadium: Highbury Stadium; Attendance: 1,744; Referee: Ross Joyce

27 August 2024	Grimsby Town (4)	1–5	Sheffield Wednesday (2)	Cleethorpes
19:45 BST	McJannet 18'	Report	Ugbo 53'; J. Lowe 54'; Paterson 72', 81'; Valentín 90+3'	Stadium: Blundell Park; Attendance: 6,364; Referee: Matt Corlett

27 August 2024	Harrogate Town (4)	0–5	Preston North End (2)	Harrogate
19:45 BST		Report	Greenwood 14', 37' (pen.); Osmajić 39', 45+1', 83'	Stadium: Wetherby Road; Attendance: 2,570; Referee: Ben Speedie

27 August 2024	Leicester City (1)	4–0	Tranmere Rovers (4)	Leicester
19:45 BST	Ayew 38'; Mavididi 51' (pen.); Ndidi 71'; Winks 90'	Report		Stadium: King Power Stadium; Attendance: 13,011; Referee: Lewis Smith

27 August 2024	Shrewsbury Town (3)	0–2	Bolton Wanderers (3)	Shrewsbury
19:45 BST		Report	Osei-Tutu 52'; Charles 65'	Stadium: New Meadow; Attendance: 3,220; Referee: Sunny Singh Gill

27 August 2024	Walsall (4)	3–2	Huddersfield Town (3)	Walsall
19:45 BST	Lowe 63', 70'; Helik 77' (o.g.)	Report	Koroma 16'; Ruffels 53'	Stadium: Bescot Stadium; Attendance: 3,378; Referee: Edward Duckworth

28 August 2024	Wolverhampton Wanderers (1)	2–0	Burnley (2)	Wolverhampton
19:30 BST	Guedes 38', 54'	Report		Stadium: Molineux Stadium; Attendance: 19,236; Referee: Josh Smith

28 August 2024	Nottingham Forest (1)	1–1 (3–4 p)	Newcastle United (1)	West Bridgford
20:00 BST	Silva 50'	Report	Willock 1'	Stadium: City Ground; Attendance: 23,083; Referee: Sam Allison
	Penalties
	Hudson-Odoi (penalty scored); Milenković (penalty scored); Williams (penalty scored); Sangaré (penalty missed); Awoniyi (penalty missed)		(penalty scored) Isak; (penalty missed) Joelinton; (penalty scored) Bruno Guimarães; (penalty scored) Gordon; (penalty scored) Longstaff

=== Southern section ===
27 August 2024	Brighton & Hove Albion (1)	4–0	Crawley Town (3)	Brighton and Hove
19:45 BST	Adingra 31'; Sarmiento 48'; Webster 84'; O'Mahony 86'	Report		Stadium: Falmer Stadium; Attendance: 19,175; Referee: Alex Chilowicz

27 August 2024	Coventry City (2)	1–0	Oxford United (2)	Coventry
19:45 BST	Thomas-Asante 57'	Report		Stadium: Coventry Building Society Arena; Attendance: 11,808; Referee: Will Finnie

27 August 2024	Millwall (2)	0–1	Leyton Orient (3)	Bermondsey
19:45 BST		Report	Agyei 14'	Stadium: The Den; Attendance: 5,875; Referee: David Rock

27 August 2024	Queens Park Rangers (2)	1–1 (4–1 p)	Luton Town (2)	Shepherd's Bush
19:45 BST	Santos 11'	Report	Nelson 16'	Stadium: Loftus Road; Attendance: 7,132; Referee: Leigh Doughty
	Penalties
	Celar (penalty scored); Dembélé (penalty scored); Clarke-Salter (penalty scored); Paal (penalty scored)		(penalty missed) Woodrow; (penalty scored) Doughty; (penalty missed) Chong

27 August 2024	Watford (2)	2–0	Plymouth Argyle (2)	Watford
19:45 BST	Rajović 17', 72'	Report		Stadium: Vicarage Road; Attendance: 8,319; Referee: Andy Davies

27 August 2024	Birmingham City (3)	0–2	Fulham (1)	Birmingham
20:00 BST		Report	Jiménez 10' (pen.); Stansfield 14'	Stadium: St Andrew's; Attendance: 11,949; Referee: Keith Stroud

27 August 2024	Crystal Palace (1)	4–0	Norwich City (2)	Selhurst
20:00 BST	Kamada 2'; Mateta 57', 68'; Eze 84'	Report		Stadium: Selhurst Park; Attendance: 12,503; Referee: Matt Donohue

28 August 2024	AFC Wimbledon (4)	2–2 (4–2 p)	Ipswich Town (1)	Wimbledon
19:45 BST	Bugiel 40'; Stevens 56'	Report	Al-Hamadi 3'; Chaplin 86'	Stadium: Plough Lane; Attendance: 7,934; Referee: James Linnington
	Penalties
	Pigott (penalty scored); Stevens (penalty scored); Reeves (penalty missed); Biler (penalty scored); Ogundere (penalty scored)		(penalty scored) Delap; (penalty scored) Burgess; (penalty missed) Taylor; (penalty missed) Hutchinson

28 August 2024	Cardiff City (2)	3–5	Southampton (1)	Cardiff
19:45 BST	Colwill 21'; Edwards 48' (o.g.); Robertson 57'	Report	Fernandes 10'; Amo-Ameyaw 30'; Archer 55', 90+4'; Bree 90+1'	Stadium: Cardiff City Stadium; Attendance: 7,225; Referee: Tom Nield

28 August 2024	Colchester United (4)	0–1	Brentford (1)	Colchester
19:45 BST		Report	Lewis-Potter 45'	Stadium: Colchester Community Stadium; Attendance: 6,716; Referee: Paul Howard

28 August 2024	Swansea City (2)	0–1	Wycombe Wanderers (3)	Swansea
19:45 BST		Report	Kone 40'	Stadium: Swansea.com Stadium; Attendance: 6,000; Referee: Ben Toner

28 August 2024	West Ham United (1)	1–0	Bournemouth (1)	Stratford
19:45 BST	Bowen 88'	Report		Stadium: London Stadium; Attendance: 47,381; Referee: Peter Bankes

== Third round ==
A total of 32 teams played in the third round: the seven Premier League clubs involved in European competitions (Arsenal, Aston Villa, Chelsea, Liverpool, Manchester City, Manchester United and Tottenham Hotspur) entered at this stage along with the 25 winners from the second round. The draw was made on 28 August 2024 by Michael Dawson and Les Ferdinand, where conditions were implemented to ensure clubs participating in the UEFA Champions League did not draw clubs participating in the UEFA Europa League due to fixture clashes.

Number of teams per tier still in the competition
Premier League	Championship	League One	League Two	Total
17 / 20	6 / 24	5 / 24	4 / 24	32 / 92

17 September 2024	Stoke City (2)	1–1 (2–1 p)	Fleetwood Town (4)	Stoke-on-Trent
19:30 BST	Rose 54'	Report	Bennett 90+1'	Stadium: Bet365 Stadium; Attendance: 8,927; Referee: Tim Robinson
	Penalties
	Cannon (penalty missed); Tezgel (penalty scored); Sidibe (penalty scored); Burger (penalty missed)		(penalty missed) Patterson; (penalty missed) Graydon; (penalty missed) Odubeko; (penalty scored) Bonds; (penalty missed) Broom

17 September 2024	Blackpool (3)	0–1	Sheffield Wednesday (2)	Blackpool
19:45 BST		Report	Bernard 34'	Stadium: Bloomfield Road; Attendance: 5,429; Referee: Thomas Kirk

17 September 2024	Brentford (1)	3–1	Leyton Orient (3)	Brentford
19:45 BST	Carvalho 17'; Damsgaard 26'; Nørgaard 45'	Report	Cooper 11'	Stadium: Brentford Community Stadium; Attendance: 13,634; Referee: Lewis Smith

17 September 2024	Everton (1)	1–1 (5–6 p)	Southampton (1)	Liverpool
19:45 BST	Doucouré 20'	Report	Harwood-Bellis 32'	Stadium: Goodison Park; Attendance: 33,842; Referee: Darren Bond
	Penalties
	Keane (penalty scored); McNeil (penalty scored); Ndiaye (penalty scored); Lindstrøm (penalty scored); Harrison (penalty scored); Young (penalty missed)		(penalty scored) Fernandes; (penalty scored) Stewart; (penalty scored) Brereton Díaz; (penalty scored) Harwood-Bellis; (penalty scored) Aribo; (penalty scored) Bree

17 September 2024	Preston North End (2)	1–1 (16–15 p)	Fulham (1)	Preston
19:45 BST	Ledson 35'	Report	Nelson 61'	Stadium: Deepdale; Attendance: 5,530; Referee: Bobby Madley
	Penalties
	Whiteman (penalty scored); Greenwood (penalty scored); Okkels (penalty scored); McCann (penalty scored); Osmajić (penalty scored); Ledson (penalty scored); Lindsay (penalty scored); Storey (penalty scored); Kesler-Hayden (penalty missed); Hughes (penalty scored); Woodman (penalty scored); Whiteman (penalty scored); Greenwood (penalty scored); Okkels (penalty scored); McCann (penalty scored); Osmajić (penalty scored); Ledson (penalty scored)		(penalty scored) Jiménez; (penalty scored) Lukić; (penalty scored) Berge; (penalty scored) Iwobi; (penalty scored) Sessegnon; (penalty scored) Castagne; (penalty scored) Smith Rowe; (penalty scored) Diop; (penalty missed) Cuenca; (penalty scored) Godo; (penalty scored) Benda; (penalty scored) Jiménez; (penalty scored) Lukić; (penalty scored) Berge; (penalty scored) Iwobi; (penalty scored) Sessegnon; (penalty missed) Castagne

17 September 2024	Queens Park Rangers (2)	1–2	Crystal Palace (1)	Shepherd's Bush
19:45 BST	Field 53'	Report	Nketiah 16'; Eze 64'	Stadium: Loftus Road; Attendance: 13,945; Referee: Sunny Singh Gill

17 September 2024	Manchester United (1)	7–0	Barnsley (3)	Trafford
20:00 BST	Rashford 16', 58'; Antony 35' (pen.); Garnacho 45+2', 49'; Eriksen 81', 85'	Report		Stadium: Old Trafford; Attendance: 72,063; Referee: Gavin Ward

18 September 2024	Brighton & Hove Albion (1)	3–2	Wolverhampton Wanderers (1)	Brighton and Hove
19:45 BST	Baleba 14'; Adingra 31'; Kadıoğlu 85'	Report	Guedes 44'; Doyle 90+1'	Stadium: Falmer Stadium; Attendance: 16,018; Referee: John Brooks

18 September 2024	Coventry City (2)	1–2	Tottenham Hotspur (1)	Coventry
20:00 BST	Thomas-Asante 63'	Report	Spence 88'; Johnson 90+2'	Stadium: Coventry Building Society Arena; Attendance: 24,616; Referee: Darren England

24 September 2024	Chelsea (1)	5–0	Barrow (4)	Fulham
19:45 BST	Nkunku 8', 15', 75'; Farman 28' (o.g.); Neto 48'	Report		Stadium: Stamford Bridge; Attendance: 38,868; Referee: Oliver Langford

24 September 2024	Manchester City (1)	2–1	Watford (2)	Manchester
19:45 BST	Doku 5'; Nunes 38'	Report	Ince 86'	Stadium: City of Manchester Stadium; Attendance: 40,584; Referee: David Webb

24 September 2024	Walsall (4)	0–0 (0–3 p)	Leicester City (1)	Walsall
19:45 BST		Report		Stadium: Bescot Stadium; Attendance: 8,010; Referee: Tom Nield
	Penalties
	Allen (penalty missed); Okagbue (penalty missed); L. Gordon (penalty missed)		(penalty scored) Pereira; (penalty scored) Coady; (penalty scored) Skipp

24 September 2024	Wycombe Wanderers (3)	1–2	Aston Villa (1)	High Wycombe
20:00 BST	Kone 90+5'	Report	Buendía 55'; Durán 85' (pen.)	Stadium: Adams Park; Attendance: 8,158; Referee: John Busby

25 September 2024	Arsenal (1)	5–1	Bolton Wanderers (3)	Holloway
19:45 BST	Rice 16'; Nwaneri 37', 49'; Sterling 64'; Havertz 77'	Report	Collins 53'	Stadium: Emirates Stadium; Attendance: 59,056; Referee: Josh Smith

25 September 2024	Liverpool (1)	5–1	West Ham United (1)	Liverpool
20:00 BST	Jota 25', 49'; Salah 74'; Gakpo 90', 90+3'	Report	Quansah 21' (o.g.)	Stadium: Anfield; Attendance: 60,044; Referee: Andrew Madley

1 October 2024	Newcastle United (1)	1–0	AFC Wimbledon (4)	Newcastle upon Tyne
19:45 BST	Schär 45+1' (pen.)	Report		Stadium: St James' Park; Attendance: 51,739; Referee: Darren Bond
Note: Fixture was initially scheduled to be hosted by Wimbledon on 24 September, but was postponed and switched to Newcastle due to flooding at Wimbledon's stadium, Plough Lane.

== Fourth round ==
The 16 winners from the third round played in the fourth round. Championship sides Preston North End, Sheffield Wednesday and Stoke City were the lowest-ranked teams in the draw, which was made on 25 September 2024 by Jamie Redknapp and Kevin Nolan.

Number of teams per tier still in the competition
Premier League	Championship	League One	League Two	Total
13 / 20	3 / 24	0 / 24	0 / 24	16 / 92

29 October 2024	Southampton (1)	3–2	Stoke City (2)	Southampton
19:45 GMT	Harwood-Bellis 19'; Armstrong 35' (pen.); Bree 88'	Report	Phillips 45'; Cannon 54'	Stadium: St Mary's Stadium; Attendance: 16,092; Referee: Lewis Smith

29 October 2024	Brentford (1)	1–1 (5–4 p)	Sheffield Wednesday (2)	Brentford
20:00 GMT	Schade 11'	Report	Gassama 57'	Stadium: Brentford Community Stadium; Attendance: 16,701; Referee: Will Finnie
	Penalties
	Mbeumo (penalty scored); Lewis-Potter (penalty scored); Damsgaard (penalty scored); Wissa (penalty scored); Janelt (penalty scored)		(penalty scored) Smith; (penalty scored) Windass; (penalty scored) J. Lowe; (penalty scored) Johnson; (penalty missed) Palmer

30 October 2024	Brighton & Hove Albion (1)	2–3	Liverpool (1)	Brighton and Hove
19:30 GMT	Adingra 81'; Lamptey 90'	Report	Gakpo 46', 63'; Díaz 85'	Stadium: Falmer Stadium; Attendance: 28,441; Referee: Darren Bond

30 October 2024	Aston Villa (1)	1–2	Crystal Palace (1)	Birmingham
19:45 GMT	Durán 23'	Report	Eze 8'; Kamada 64'	Stadium: Villa Park; Attendance: 34,851; Referee: Sam Barrott

30 October 2024	Manchester United (1)	5–2	Leicester City (1)	Trafford
19:45 GMT	Casemiro 15', 39'; Garnacho 28'; Fernandes 36', 59'	Report	El Khannouss 33'; Coady 45+3'	Stadium: Old Trafford; Attendance: 73,470; Referee: Andrew Madley

30 October 2024	Newcastle United (1)	2–0	Chelsea (1)	Newcastle upon Tyne
19:45 GMT	Isak 23'; Disasi 26' (o.g.)	Report		Stadium: St James' Park; Attendance: 51,934; Referee: Chris Kavanagh

30 October 2024	Preston North End (2)	0–3	Arsenal (1)	Preston
19:45 GMT		Report	Gabriel Jesus 24'; Nwaneri 33'; Havertz 57'	Stadium: Deepdale; Attendance: 21,811; Referee: Peter Bankes

30 October 2024	Tottenham Hotspur (1)	2–1	Manchester City (1)	Tottenham
20:15 GMT	Werner 5'; Sarr 25'	Report	Nunes 45+4'	Stadium: Tottenham Hotspur Stadium; Attendance: 60,797; Referee: Robert Jones

== Quarter-finals ==
The eight winners from the fourth round played in the quarter-finals. For the first time since the 2009–10 season, all eight remaining teams were Premier League sides. The draw was made on 30 October 2024 by Jamie Redknapp and Izzy Christiansen.

Number of teams per tier still in the competition
Premier League	Championship	League One	League Two	Total
8 / 20	0 / 24	0 / 24	0 / 24	8 / 92

18 December 2024	Arsenal (1)	3–2	Crystal Palace (1)	Holloway
19:30 GMT	Gabriel Jesus 54', 73', 81'	Report	Mateta 4'; Nketiah 85'	Stadium: Emirates Stadium; Attendance: 59,298; Referee: Andrew Madley

18 December 2024	Newcastle United (1)	3–1	Brentford (1)	Newcastle upon Tyne
19:45 GMT	Tonali 9', 43'; Schär 69'	Report	Wissa 90+1'	Stadium: St James' Park; Attendance: 51,765; Referee: Sam Barrott

18 December 2024	Southampton (1)	1–2	Liverpool (1)	Southampton
20:00 GMT	Archer 59'	Report	Núñez 24'; Elliott 32'	Stadium: St Mary's Stadium; Attendance: 26,503; Referee: Simon Hooper

19 December 2024	Tottenham Hotspur (1)	4–3	Manchester United (1)	Tottenham
20:00 GMT	Solanke 15', 54'; Kulusevski 46'; Son Heung-min 88'	Report	Zirkzee 63'; Amad 70'; Evans 90+4'	Stadium: Tottenham Hotspur Stadium; Attendance: 57,409; Referee: John Brooks

== Semi-finals ==
The four winners from the quarter-finals played in the semi-finals. The draw was made on 19 December 2024 by Jamie Carragher and Jamie Redknapp.

Number of teams per tier still in the competition
Premier League	Championship	League One	League Two	Total
4 / 20	0 / 24	0 / 24	0 / 24	4 / 92

Team 1	Agg.	Team 2	1st leg	2nd leg
Arsenal (1)	0–4	Newcastle United (1)	0–2	0–2
Tottenham Hotspur (1)	1–4	Liverpool (1)	1–0	0–4

7 January 2025
20:00 GMT

Arsenal (1)	0–2	Newcastle United (1)
	Report	Isak 37'; Gordon 51'

Emirates Stadium, Holloway
Attendance: 59,125
Referee: John Brooks
5 February 2025
20:00 GMT

Newcastle United (1)	2–0	Arsenal (1)
Murphy 19'; Gordon 52'	Report

St James' Park, Newcastle upon Tyne
Attendance: 52,173
Referee: Simon Hooper

Newcastle United won 4–0 on aggregate.

8 January 2025
20:00 GMT

Tottenham Hotspur (1)	1–0	Liverpool (1)
Bergvall 86'	Report

Tottenham Hotspur Stadium, Tottenham
Attendance: 59,037
Referee: Stuart Attwell
6 February 2025
20:00 GMT

Liverpool (1)	4–0	Tottenham Hotspur (1)
Gakpo 34'; Salah 51' (pen.); Szoboszlai 75'; Van Dijk 80'	Report

Anfield, Liverpool
Attendance: 60,395
Referee: Craig Pawson

Liverpool won 4–1 on aggregate.

== Final ==
Number of teams per tier still in the competition
Premier League	Championship	League One	League Two	Total
2 / 20	0 / 24	0 / 24	0 / 24	2 / 92

16 March 2025
16:30 GMT

Liverpool	1–2	Newcastle United
Chiesa 90+4'	Report	Burn 45'; Isak 52'

Wembley Stadium, London
Attendance: 88,513
Referee: John Brooks

== Top goalscorers ==
Rank	Player	Club	Goals
1	(Netherlands) Cody Gakpo	Liverpool	5
2	(Brazil) Gabriel Jesus	Arsenal	4
2	(England) Tom Ince	Watford	4
4	(Ivory Coast) Simon Adingra	Brighton & Hove Albion	3
4	(England) Cameron Archer	Southampton	3
4	(England) Eberechi Eze	Crystal Palace	3
4	(Argentina) Alejandro Garnacho	Manchester United	3
4	(Portugal) Gonçalo Guedes	Wolverhampton Wanderers	3
4	(Republic of Ireland) Ryan Graydon	Fleetwood Town	3
4	(Sweden) Alexander Isak	Newcastle United	3
4	(France) Jean-Philippe Mateta	Crystal Palace	3
4	(France) Christopher Nkunku	Chelsea	3
4	(England) Ethan Nwaneri	Arsenal	3
4	(Montenegro) Milutin Osmajić	Preston North End	3
