= 2024–25 Preston North End F.C. season =

English football club season

Preston North End
2024–25 season
- Owner: Wordon Limited
- Chairman: Craig Hemmings
- Manager: Ryan Lowe (until 12 August); Mike Marsh, Ched Evans & Peter Murphy (until 17 August); Paul Heckingbottom (from 20 August)
- Stadium: Deepdale
- Championship: 20th
- Top goalscorer: League: Emil Riis Jakobsen (12); All: Milutin Osmajić (15)
- Highest home attendance: 20,945
- Lowest home attendance: 12,838
- Average home league attendance: 16,505
Home colours	Away colours	Third colours

The 2024–25 season was the 145th season in the history of Preston North End Football Club and their tenth consecutive season in the Championship. In addition to the domestic league, the club would also participate in the FA Cup, and the EFL Cup.

== Transfers ==
=== In ===
Date	Pos.	Player	From	Fee	Ref.
9 July 2024	CM	(Iceland) Stefán Teitur Þórðarson	(Denmark) Silkeborg IF	Undisclosed	
13 August 2024	LW	(Denmark) Jeppe Okkels	(Netherlands) Utrecht	Undisclosed	
3 January 2025	CB	(England) Lewis Gibson	(England) Plymouth Argyle	Undisclosed	

=== Out ===
Date	Pos.	Player	To	Fee	Ref.
2 July 2024	CM	(England) Lewis Leigh	(England) Bromley	Undisclosed	

=== Loaned in ===
Date	Pos.	Player	From	Date until	Ref.
5 July 2024	AM	(England) Sam Greenwood	(England) Leeds United	End of Season	
7 August 2024	RB	(England) Kaine Kesler-Hayden	(England) Aston Villa	End of Season	
30 August 2024	RW	(England) Josh Bowler	(England) Nottingham Forest	31 January 2025 (Note: On 31 January, Bowler's loan from Nottingham Forest was cancelled by mutual agreement)	
16 January 2025	LB	(England) Jayden Meghoma	(England) Brentford	End of Season	
3 February 2025	CB	(Scotland) Ryan Porteous	(England) Watford	End of Season	

=== Loaned out ===
Date	Pos.	Player	To	Date until	Ref.
10 August 2024	CM	(England) Kaedyn Kamara	(England) Workington	9 November 2024	
23 August 2024	LB	(Poland) Kacper Pasiek	(England) Marine	1 January 2025	
27 August 2024	RB	(Republic of Ireland) Josh Seary	(Northern Ireland) Larne	12 January 2025	
29 August 2024	CF	(England) Finlay Cross-Adair	(England) Prescot Cables	1 December 2024	
29 August 2024	DM	(England) Noah Mawene	(Wales) Newport County	End of Season	
20 September 2024	GK	(Wales) James Pradic	(England) Bamber Bridge	1 January 2025	
2 November 2024	GK	(England) Tommy Davis	(England) Bamber Bridge	9 November 2024	
28 December 2024	GK	(England) Tommy Davis	(England) Ramsbottom United	1 February 2025	
3 January 2025	CF	(England) Layton Stewart	(Switzerland) Thun	End of Season	
4 January 2025	LB	(Poland) Kacper Pasiek	(England) Altrincham	4 March 2025 (Note: On 4 February, Pasiek's loan at Altrincham was extended by a further month)	
6 January 2025	LW	(Denmark) Jeppe Okkels	(Scotland) Aberdeen	End of Season	
10 January 2025	CM	(England) Kaedyn Kamara	(England) Marine	End of Season	
29 January 2025	LB	(England) Kian Best	(Republic of Ireland) Bohemian	End of Season	
31 January 2025	CM	(England) Kian Taylor	(England) Altrincham	1 March 2025	
3 February 2025	AM	(England) Kitt Nelson	(Republic of Ireland) Cork City	30 June 2025	
7 February 2025	CF	(Northern Ireland) Max Wilson	(Republic of Ireland) Galway United	30 November 2025	
25 February 2025	CB	(England) Cole McGhee	(England) Chorley	29 March 2025	

=== Released / Out of Contract ===
Date	Pos.	Player	Subsequent club	Join date	Ref.
30 June 2024	CM	(Republic of Ireland) Alan Browne	(England) Sunderland	11 July 2024	
30 June 2024	CB	(Republic of Ireland) Greg Cunningham	(Republic of Ireland) Galway United	17 July 2024	
30 June 2024	AM	(Wales) Ben Woodburn	(England) Salford City	23 July 2024	
1 December 2024	CF	(England) Finlay Cross-Adair	(England) Fleetwood Town	1 December 2024	
11 March 2025	RM	(United States) Duane Holmes	(United States) Houston Dynamo	11 March 2025	

== Pre-season and friendlies ==
On 8 May, PNE announced they will spend a week training camp in San Pedro del Pinatar, with a friendly against Lincoln City. A second friendly was later confirmed, with the traditional pre-season visit to Bamber Bridge added. In June, a further three were added against Everton, Salford City and Southport. On 20 June, the club announced Fiorentina would visit Deepdale during pre-season.

Win Draw Loss Fixtures

12 July 2024 Friendly	Preston North End	0–1	Lincoln City	San Pedro del Pinatar, Spain
11:00 CEST (10:00 BST)		Report	Makama 2'	Stadium: Pinatar Arena

16 July 2024 Friendly	Southport	2–1	Preston North End	Blowick
19:30 BST	Carver 19'; Trialist 73'	Report	Frøkjær-Jensen 30'	Stadium: Haig Avenue; Attendance: 1,142

17 July 2024 Friendly	Bamber Bridge	0–3	Preston North End	Bamber Bridge
19:00 BST		Report	Stewart 24'; Ledson 55'; Mawene 78'	Stadium: Sir Tom Finney Stadium; Attendance: 1,238

19 July 2024 Friendly	Liverpool	0–1	Preston North End	Kirkby
16:00 BST		Report	Brady 27'	Stadium: The Academy; Attendance: 0 (Behind-closed-doors)

23 July 2024 Friendly	Preston North End	0–2	Tranmere Rovers	Euxton
15:00 GMT		Report	Davison 2', 15'	Stadium: Preston North End Training Ground; Attendance: 0 (Behind-closed-doors)

27 July 2024 Friendly	Preston North End	2–1	Fiorentina	Preston
15:00 BST	Lindsay 23'; Keane 44'	Report	Mandragora 31'	Stadium: Deepdale; Attendance: 5,516

30 July 2024 Friendly	Salford City	0–2	Preston North End	Kersal
19:30 BST		Report	Brady 45'; Osmajić 85'	Stadium: Moor Lane

3 August 2024 Friendly	Preston North End	0–3	Everton	Preston
15:00 BST			Calvert-Lewin 15', O'Brien 61', Lindstrøm 70'	Stadium: Deepdale

== Competitions ==
=== Championship ===
==== League table ====
Pos	Team	Pld	W	D	L	GF	GA	GD	Pts	Promotion, qualification or relegation
18	Stoke City	46	12	15	19	45	62	−17	51	
19	Derby County	46	13	11	22	48	56	−8	50	
20	Preston North End	46	10	20	16	48	59	−11	50	
21	Hull City	46	12	13	21	44	54	−10	49	
22	Luton Town (R)	46	13	10	23	45	69	−24	49	Relegation to EFL League One

Source: English Football League
Rules for classification: 1) Points; 2) Goal difference; 3) Number of goals scored; 4) Head-to-head results; 5) Wins; 6) Away goals; 7) Penalty points (sec 9.5); 8) Number of 12-point sending off offences; 9) Play-off (only if needed to determine promotion/relegation)
(R) Relegated

==== Results summary ====
Overall								Home						Away					
Pld	W	D	L	GF	GA	GD	Pts	W	D	L	GF	GA	GD	W	D	L	GF	GA	GD
46	10	20	16	48	59	−11	50	7	12	4	26	22	+4	3	8	12	22	37	−15

Last updated: 26 April 2025.
Source: Soccerway

==== Results by round ====
Round	1	2	3	4	5	6	7	8	9	10	11	12	13	14	15	16	17	18	19	20	21	22	23	24	25	26	27	28	29	30	32	33	31^{1}	34	35	36	37	38	39	40	41	42	43	44	45	46
Ground	H	A	H	A	A	H	A	H	A	H	H	A	H	H	A	H	A	H	A	A	H	A	H	H	A	H	A	A	H	A	A	H	H	A	H	A	A	H	A	H	H	A	H	A	H	A
Result	L	L	W	L	D	D	L	W	D	W	D	D	L	D	L	D	D	D	D	W	D	L	W	W	L	D	D	W	W	L	W	D	D	L	D	L	D	W	L	D	D	L	L	L	L	D
Position	22	23	18	21	21	21	22	21	19	15	15	16	20	20	20	20	19	18	17	14	16	18	16	14	16	15	16	16	14	15	15	15	15	15	15	16	15	14	14	14	16	17	17	18	20	20
Points	0	0	3	3	4	5	5	8	9	12	13	14	14	15	15	16	17	18	19	22	23	23	26	29	29	30	31	34	37	37	40	41	42	42	43	43	44	47	47	48	49	49	49	49	49	50

Source: EFL
A = Away; H = Home; W = Win; D = Draw; L = Loss; P = Postponed
Notes:
- ^{1} Matchday 31 (vs. Millwall) was postponed due to Preston's involvements in the FA Cup fifth round.
- ^{2} Matchday 39 (vs. Derby County) was postponed due to Preston's involvements in the FA Cup quarter-finals.

==== Matches ====
On 26 June, the Championship fixtures were announced.

Win Draw Loss Fixtures

9 August 2024 1	Preston North End	0–2	Sheffield United	Preston
20:00 BST	Lindsay (yellow card) 80'	Report	Arblaster 12'; Hamer 55'	Stadium: Deepdale; Attendance: 17,948; Referee: Robert Madley

17 August 2024 2	Swansea City	3–0	Preston North End	Swansea
15:00 BST	Grimes 40' (pen.); Abdulai (yellow card) 59', (goal) 61'; Vipotnik 83'	Report	Frøkjær-Jensen (yellow card) 34'; Ledson (yellow card) 43'; Whiteman (yellow card) 63'	Stadium: Swansea.com Stadium; Attendance: 14,037; Referee: Stephen Martin

24 August 2024 3	Preston North End	1–0	Luton Town	Preston
15:00 BST	Keane 39'; Whiteman (yellow card) 41'; Potts (yellow card) 43'; Frøkjær-Jensen (yellow card) 58'; Kesler-Hayden (yellow card) 72'; Greenwood (yellow card) 76'; Holmes (yellow card) 81'	Report	Baptiste (yellow card) 54'	Stadium: Deepdale; Attendance: 15,245; Referee: Dean Whitestone

31 August 2024 4	Oxford United	3–1	Preston North End	Oxford
15:00 BST	Harris 20'; Rodrigues (yellow card) 45+3'; Goodrham 53'; Leigh 71'; Kioso (yellow card) 83'	Report	Jakobsen 3'; Greenwood (yellow card) 22'; Lindsay (yellow card) 52' (yellow-red card) 70'; Brady (yellow card) 76'; McCann (yellow card) 90+6'	Stadium: Kassam Stadium; Attendance: 11,403; Referee: Keith Stroud

14 September 2024 5	Middlesbrough	1–1	Preston North End	Middlesbrough
15:00 BST	Conway 16'	Report	Whatmough (yellow card) 33'; Storey (yellow card) 36'; Frøkjær-Jensen 43'; Hughes (yellow card) 60'; Woodman (yellow card) 74'; Brady (yellow card) 86'	Stadium: Riverside Stadium; Attendance: 25,116; Referee: Tom Nield

22 September 2024 6	Preston North End	0–0	Blackburn Rovers	Preston
12:00 BST	Whiteman (yellow card) 26'; Greenwood (red card) 42'; Hughes (yellow card) 47'; Osmajić (yellow card) 89'; Potts (yellow card) 90+4'	Report	Carter (yellow card) 7'; Tronstad (yellow card) 61'; Cantwell (yellow card) 85'; Weimann (yellow card) 86'; Beck (red card) 89'; Pickering (yellow card) 90+5'	Stadium: Deepdale; Attendance: 20,945; Referee: Matt Donohue
Note: Fixture was initially scheduled for 21 September, but was moved for live Sky Sports broadcast.

28 September 2024 7	Millwall	3–1	Preston North End	Bermondsey
15:00 GMT	Honeyman 24', (yellow card) 39'; Esse 38'; Langstaff 47'; Bryan (yellow card) 86'; Emakhu (yellow card) 89' (yellow-red card) 89'	Report	Holmes (yellow card) 42'; McCann (yellow card) 77'; Storey 87'	Stadium: The Den; Attendance: 13,674; Referee: Darren Bond

2 October 2024 8	Preston North End	3–0	Watford	Preston
19:45 GMT	Brady (yellow card) 40'; Osmajić 53', 65'; Whiteman (yellow card) 70'; McCann 75'	Report		Stadium: Deepdale; Attendance: 13,602; Referee: Andrew Kitchen

5 October 2024 9	Burnley	0–0	Preston North End	Burnley
12:30 GMT	Foster (yellow card) 66'; Brownhill (yellow card) 69'; Egan-Riley (yellow card) 71'	Report	Hughes (yellow card) 26'; Woodman (yellow card) 44'; Whiteman (yellow card) 54'; McCann (yellow card) 69'	Stadium: Turf Moor; Attendance: 20,816; Referee: Gavin Ward
Note: Fixture was initially scheduled for a 15:00 kick-off, but was moved for live Sky Sports broadcast.

19 October 2024 10	Preston North End	1–0	Coventry City	Preston
12:30 GMT	Ledson (yellow card) 4'; Jakobsen (yellow card) 39', (goal) 72'; Hughes (yellow card) 48'; Woodman (yellow card) 84'	Report		Stadium: Deepdale; Attendance: 15,907; Referee: Josh Smith
Note: Fixture was initially scheduled for a 15:00 kick-off, but was moved for live Sky Sports broadcast.

22 October 2024 11	Preston North End	2–2	Norwich City	Preston
19:45 BST	Greenwood 6' (pen.); Holmes 12'; Whiteman (yellow card) 30'; Storey (yellow card) 36'	Report	Doyle (yellow card) 27'; McLean (yellow card) 32'; Sainz 45+2'; Duffy 61'; Marcondes (yellow card) 64'	Stadium: Deepdale; Attendance: 13,677; Referee: Will Finnie

26 October 2024 12	Plymouth Argyle	3–3	Preston North End	Plymouth
15:00 BST	Issaka 55'; Gray 82'; Whittaker 90+2'	Report	Greenwood 16', (yellow card) 46'; Kesler-Hayden (yellow card) 41'; Frøkjær-Jensen 45+3'; Potts 48'	Stadium: Home Park; Referee: Andy Davies

2 November 2024 13	Preston North End	1–3	Bristol City	Preston
15:00 GMT	Frøkjær-Jensen (yellow card) 6'; McCann (yellow card) 40'; Greenwood 48'; Potts (yellow card) 62'; Holmes (yellow card) 76'	Report	Hirakawa 6'; Wells 51', (yellow card) 65'; Roberts (yellow card) 70'; Vyner (yellow card) 80'; Bird 81'	Stadium: Deepdale; Attendance: 14,261; Referee: Tom Nield

6 November 2024 14	Preston North End	0–0	Sunderland	Preston
20:00 GMT	Whiteman (yellow card) 37'; Lindsay (yellow card) 59'	Report	Mepham (yellow card) 5'	Stadium: Deepdale; Attendance: 18,064; Referee: Lewis Smith
Note: Fixture was initially scheduled for a 19:45 kick-off, but was moved for live Sky Sports broadcast.

9 November 2024 15	Portsmouth	3–1	Preston North End	Milton
15:00 GMT	Murphy 36'; Ogilvie 45'; Poole (yellow card) 68'; Bishop 89' (pen.)	Report	Jakobsen 50'	Stadium: Fratton Park; Attendance: 20,295; Referee: John Busby

23 November 2024 16	Preston North End	1–1	Derby County	Preston
15:00 GMT	Greenwood 23', (yellow card) 62'; McCann (yellow card) 87'	Report	Yates 29'; Thompson (yellow card) 58'; Harness (yellow card) 90'	Stadium: Deepdale; Attendance: 16,646; Referee: David Webb

27 November 2024 17	Stoke City	0–0	Preston North End	Stoke-on-Trent
19:45 GMT	Burger (yellow card) 48'	Report	Woodman (yellow card) 53', (red card) 90'; Riis Jakobsen (yellow card) 90+7'	Stadium: Bet365 Stadium; Attendance: 19,805; Referee: Matt Donohue

30 November 2024 18	Preston North End	1–1	West Bromwich Albion	Preston
15:00 GMT	Storey (yellow card) 44'; Riis Jakobsen 55'; Whatmough (yellow card) 69'	Report	Grant 13', (yellow card) 54'	Stadium: Deepdale; Attendance: 16,124; Referee: Thomas Bramall

7 December 2024 19	Sheffield Wednesday	1–1	Preston North End	Owlerton
12:30 GMT	Palmer (yellow card) 36'; Windass (penalty missed) 53'; Charles (yellow card) 69'; Johnson (yellow card) 70'; Smith 76'; Chalobah (yellow card) 78'	Report	Jakobsen 14'; McCann (yellow card) 63'; Þórðarson (yellow card) 81'	Stadium: Hillsborough Stadium; Attendance: 23,927; Referee: Bobby Madley
Note: Fixture was initially scheduled for a 15:00 kick-off, but was moved for live Sky Sports broadcast.

11 December 2024 20	Cardiff City	0–2	Preston North End	Leckwith
19:45 GMT	Ng (yellow card) 33'; Ralls (yellow card) 81'	Report	Frøkjær-Jensen (yellow card) 33'; Greenwood (yellow card) 37'; Chambers 48' (o.g.); McCann (yellow card) 74'; Kesler-Hayden (yellow card) 76'; Osmajić 90+3', (yellow card) 90+4'	Stadium: Cardiff City Stadium; Attendance: 15,006; Referee: James Linington

14 December 2024 21	Preston North End	1–1	Leeds United	Preston
12:30 GMT	Potts 23'; Whiteman (yellow card) 32'; Lindsay (yellow card) 88'	Report	James (yellow card) 39'; Whatmough 90+3' (o.g.)	Stadium: Deepdale; Attendance: 19,508; Referee: John Busby
Note: Fixture was initially scheduled for a 15:00 kick-off, but was moved for live Sky Sports broadcast.

21 December 2024 22	Queens Park Rangers	2–1	Preston North End	Shepherd's Bush
15:00 GMT	Kolli 50'; Dunne 89', (yellow card) 90+1'	Report	Osmajić 21'; Lindsay (yellow card) 32' (yellow-red card) 83'	Stadium: Loftus Road; Attendance: 15,323; Referee: Matt Donohue

26 December 2024 23	Preston North End	1–0	Hull City	Preston
15:00 GMT	Potts 60', (yellow card) 90+3'; Kesler-Hayden (yellow card) 84'; McCann (yellow card) 90+4'	Report	Slater (yellow card) 41'	Stadium: Deepdale; Referee: Josh Smith

29 December 2024 24	Preston North End	3–1	Sheffield Wednesday	Preston
12:30 GMT	Jakobsen 29', 79'; Greenwood 64' (pen.); Holmes (yellow card) 85'; Frøkjær-Jensen (yellow card) 90+7'	Report	Windass 59'	Stadium: Deepdale; Attendance: 19,950; Referee: Sunny Singh Gill
Note: Fixture was initially scheduled for a 15:00 kick-off, but was moved for live Sky Sports broadcast.

1 January 2025 25	West Bromwich Albion	3–1	Preston North End	West Bromwich
15:00 GMT	Maja 18', 40'; Styles 35'; Bartley (yellow card) 90+6'	Report	Þórðarson (yellow card) 42'; McCann (yellow card) 56'; Ledson 70'; Whatmough (yellow card) 71'; Whiteman (yellow card) 89'	Stadium: The Hawthorns; Attendance: 24,320; Referee: Bobby Madley

4 January 2025 26	Preston North End	1–1	Oxford United	Preston
15:00 GMT	Lindsay (yellow card) 20'; Storey (yellow card) 63'; Keane 69'; Whiteman (yellow card) 86'	Report	Rodrigues 21'; Long (yellow card) 32'; Cumming (yellow card) 60'; Dembélé (yellow card) 90+4'	Stadium: Deepdale; Attendance: 14,749; Referee: Ben Toner

18 January 2025 27	Luton Town	0–0	Preston North End	Luton
15:00 GMT	Brown (yellow card) 42'; Holmes (yellow card) 55'; Morris (yellow card) 62'	Report	Storey (yellow card) 17'; Hughes (yellow card) 69'	Stadium: Kenilworth Road; Attendance: 11,540; Referee: Tim Robinson

21 January 2025 28	Watford	1–2	Preston North End	Watford
19:45 GMT	Vata 90'	Report	Osmajić 17', 56'; Storey (yellow card) 27'; Þórðarson (yellow card) 71'	Stadium: Vicarage Road; Attendance: 16,397; Referee: Tom Nield

25 January 2025 29	Preston North End	2–1	Middlesbrough	Preston
15:00 GMT	Thordarson 28'; Riis 78'	Report	Burgzorg 52'	Stadium: Deepdale; Attendance: 18,474; Referee: John Busby

31 January 2025 30	Blackburn Rovers	2–1	Preston North End	Blackburn
20:00 GMT	Gueye 39'; Buckley (yellow card) 63'; Cantwell 78' (pen.)	Report	Potts 90+3'; Whatmough (yellow card) 90+8'	Stadium: Ewood Park; Attendance: 21,392; Referee: Josh Smith
Note: Fixture was initially scheduled for 30 January, but was moved for live Sky Sports broadcasting.

11 February 2025 32	Norwich City	0–1	Preston North End	Norwich
20:00 GMT	Crnac (yellow card) 65'	Report	Osmajić 5'; Ledson (yellow card) 64'; Woodman (yellow card) 80'; Hughes (yellow card) 89'	Stadium: Carrow Road; Attendance: 25,910; Referee: Gavin Ward
Note: Fixture was initially scheduled for a 19:45 kick-off, but was moved for live Sky Sports broadcasting.

15 February 2025 33	Preston North End	0–0	Burnley	Preston
12:30 GMT	Porteous (yellow card) 53'; Hughes (yellow card) 80'	Report	Flemming (yellow card) 78'; Anthony (yellow card) 90+7'	Stadium: Deepdale; Attendance: 19,864; Referee: Andrew Kitchen
Note: Fixture was initially scheduled for a 15:00 kick-off, but was moved for live Sky Sports broadcasting.

18 February 2025 31	Preston North End	1–1	Millwall	Preston
19:45 GMT	Riis Jakobsen 47'	Report	Ivanović 40'; Bangura-Williams (yellow card) 51'; Bryan (yellow card) 63'; Honeyman (yellow card) 90'; Crama (yellow card) 90+3'	Stadium: Deepdale; Attendance: 13,290; Referee: Matthew Donohue
Note: Fixture was initially scheduled for 8 February, but was postponed due to Preston's participation in the FA Cup fifth round.

22 February 2025 34	Coventry City	2–1	Preston North End	Coventry
15:00 GMT	Rudoni 30'; Thomas 37'	Report	Lindsay (yellow card) 65'; Keane 82'	Stadium: Coventry Building Society Arena; Attendance: 26,493; Referee: Oliver Langford

4 March 2025 35	Preston North End	0–0	Swansea City	Preston
19:45 GMT		Report		Stadium: Deepdale; Attendance: 12,838; Referee: Stephen Martin

8 March 2025 36	Sheffield United	1–0	Preston North End	Sheffield
15:00 GMT	Campbell 56'	Report	Þórðarson (yellow card) 31'; Porteous (yellow card) 61'; Greenwood (yellow card) 69'; Gibson (yellow card) 90+4'	Stadium: Bramall Lane; Attendance: 27,136; Referee: John Busby

11 March 2025 37	Sunderland	1–1	Preston North End	Sunderland
19:45 GMT	Hume (yellow card) 20'; Mundle 86'	Report	Gibson (yellow card) 23'; Kesler-Hayden (yellow card) 52'; Riis Jakobsen 65'; Woodman (yellow card) 90'	Stadium: Stadium of Light; Attendance: 37,771; Referee: Lewis Smith

15 March 2025 38	Preston North End	2–1	Portsmouth	Preston
15:00 GMT	Frøkjær-Jensen (yellow card) 24'; Porteous 76'; Þórðarson 87'; Greenwood (yellow card) 90' (yellow-red card) 90+4'	Report	Bishop 83'; Waddingham (yellow card) 90+5'	Stadium: Deepdale; Attendance: 17,240; Referee: Tony Harrington

2 April 2025 39	Derby County	2–0	Preston North End	Derby
19:45 BST	Thompson (yellow card) 15'; Forsyth 48'; Yates 52'	Report	Brady (yellow card) 72'; Frøkjær-Jensen (yellow card) 90'	Stadium: Pride Park Stadium; Attendance: 26,014; Referee: Stephen Martin
Note: Fixture was initially scheduled for a 15:00 kick-off, but was moved for live Sky Sports broadcasting. The match was then rearranged due to Preston's participation in the FA Cup quarter-finals.

5 April 2025 40	Preston North End	1–1	Stoke City	Preston
15:00 BST	Kesler-Hayden 10'; Brady (yellow card) 15'; Osmajić (yellow card) 39'; Lindsay (yellow card) 74'; Ledson (yellow card) 81'	Report	Gallagher (yellow card) 55'; Baker 75' (pen.), (yellow card) 76'; Thompson (yellow card) 81'	Stadium: Deepdale; Attendance: 17,341; Referee: Farai Hallam

8 April 2025 41	Preston North End	2–2	Cardiff City	Preston
19:45 BST	Osmajić 19'; Þórðarson 72'	Report	Alves 52'; Robertson (yellow card) 78'; Fish (yellow card) 86'; Méïté 90+4'	Stadium: Deepdale; Attendance: 13,293; Referee: David Webb

12 April 2025 42	Leeds United	2–1	Preston North End	Leeds
12:30 BST	Solomon 4'; Bogle 13'; Darlow (yellow card) 72'; Ampadu (yellow card) 87'	Report	Kesler-Hayden 6'; Hughes (yellow card) 45+1'	Stadium: Elland Road; Attendance: 35,747; Referee: John Busby
Note: Fixture was initially scheduled for a 15:00 kick-off, but was moved for live Sky Sports broadcasting.

18 April 2025 43	Preston North End	1–2	Queens Park Rangers	Preston
15:00 BST	Lindsay 45+5'; Whiteman (yellow card) 52'	Report	Kolli (yellow card) 48'; Ashby (yellow card) 70'; Frey 80'; Andersen 90+3'	Stadium: Deepdale; Attendance: 14,922; Referee: Jeremy Simpson

21 April 2025 44	Hull City	2–1	Preston North End	Kingston upon Hull
15:00 BST	Gelhardt 50' (pen.), 67' (pen.)	Report	Gibson 34'; Þórðarson (yellow card) 66'; Frøkjær-Jensen (yellow card) 80'; Brady (yellow card) 90+2'	Stadium: MKM Stadium; Attendance: 22,103; Referee: Thomas Bramall

26 April 2025 45	Preston North End	1–2	Plymouth Argyle	Preston
15:00 BST	Þórðarson (yellow card) 30'; Whiteman (yellow card) 33'; Riis Jakobsen 90'; Brady (yellow card) 90+2'	Report	Bundu 14'; Pleguezuelo (yellow card) 33'; Pálsson (yellow card) 46'; Wright 75'	Stadium: Deepdale; Attendance: 19,198; Referee: Matt Donohue

3 May 2025 46	Bristol City	2–2	Preston North End	Bristol
12:30 BST	McCrorie 69', 74', (yellow card) 90+1'; Roberts (yellow card) 90+6'	Report	Ledson (yellow card) 22'; Riis Jakobsen 28'; Brady (yellow card) 32'; Kesler-Hayden (yellow card) 50'; Osmajić 60'; Mawene (yellow card) 61'	Stadium: Ashton Gate; Attendance: 24,987; Referee: James Linington
Note: Fixture was initially scheduled for a 15:00 kick-off, but all EFL Championship final matchday fixtures were moved to an earlier kick-off.

=== FA Cup ===
As a Championship side, Preston North End entered the FA Cup in the third round, and were drawn at home to League One side Charlton Athletic. They were drawn at home against League One side Wycombe Wanderers in the fourth round, then at home to fellow Championship side Burnley in the fifth round. In the quarter-finals, they were drawn at home to Premier League side Aston Villa.

Win Draw Loss Fixtures

14 January 2025 Third round	Preston North End	2–1	Charlton Athletic	Preston
19:45 GMT	Osmajić 32', 47'; Gibson (yellow card) 65'	Report	Jones (yellow card) 18'; Berry 40'	Stadium: Deepdale; Attendance: 7,734; Referee: Ruebyn Ricardo
Note: Fixture was initially scheduled for 11 January, but was postponed and rearranged for three days later due to a frozen pitch.

8 February 2025 Fourth round	Preston North End	0–0 (a.e.t.) (4–2 p)	Wycombe Wanderers	Preston
15:00 GMT	Osmajić (yellow card) 45'; Ledson (yellow card) 90+4'	Report	Onyedinma (yellow card) 26'; Bakinson (yellow card) 110'	Stadium: Deepdale; Attendance: 10,444; Referee: Benjamin Speedie
	Penalties
	Greenwood (penalty scored); Osmajić (penalty scored); Frøkjær-Jensen (penalty scored); McCann (penalty missed); Evans (penalty scored)		(penalty scored) Lubala; (penalty missed) Udoh; (penalty missed) Reach; (penalty scored) Scowen

1 March 2025 Fifth round	Preston North End	3–0	Burnley	Preston
12:15 GMT	Þórðarson (yellow card) 28'; Brady 31'; Kesler-Hayden (yellow card) 35'; Osmajić 44'; Ledson (yellow card) 67'; Keane 73'	Report	Pires (yellow card) 30'; Brownhill (yellow card) 36'	Stadium: Deepdale; Attendance: 17,761; Referee: John Brooks

30 March 2025 Quarter-finals	Preston North End	0–3	Aston Villa	Preston
13:30 BST	Keane (yellow card) 28'; Whiteman (yellow card) 67'	Report	Rashford 58', 63' (pen.); Ramsey 73'	Stadium: Deepdale; Attendance: 22,198; Referee: Chris Kavanagh

=== EFL Cup ===
On 27 June, the draw for the first round was made, with Preston being drawn at home against Sunderland. In the second round, they were drawn away to Harrogate Town. In the third round, they were back at home against Fulham, followed by another home tie to Arsenal in the fourth round.

Win Draw Loss Fixtures

13 August 2024 First round	Preston North End	2–0	Sunderland	Preston
19:45 BST	Brady (yellow card) 31'; Ledson 37'; Frøkjær-Jensen 70'	Report	Hjelde (yellow card) 25'	Stadium: Deepdale; Attendance: 7,231; Referee: Ollie Yates

27 August 2024 Second round	Harrogate Town	0–5	Preston North End	Harrogate
19:45 BST	O'Connor (yellow card) 13'	Report	Greenwood 14', 37' (pen.); Osmajić 39', 45+1', 83'	Stadium: Wetherby Road; Attendance: 2,570; Referee: Ben Speedie

17 September 2024 Third round	Preston North End	1–1 (16–15 p)	Fulham	Preston
19:45 BST	Ledson 35'	Report	Diop (yellow card) 17'; Nelson 61'	Stadium: Deepdale; Attendance: 5,530; Referee: Bobby Madley
	Penalties
	Whiteman (penalty scored); Greenwood (penalty scored); Okkels (penalty scored); McCann (penalty scored); Osmajić (penalty scored); Ledson (penalty scored); Lindsay (penalty scored); Storey (penalty scored); Kesler-Hayden (penalty missed); Hughes (penalty scored); Woodman (penalty scored); Whiteman (penalty scored); Greenwood (penalty scored); Okkels (penalty scored); McCann (penalty scored); Osmajić (penalty scored); Ledson (penalty scored)		(penalty scored) Jiménez; (penalty scored) Lukić; (penalty scored) Berge; (penalty scored) Iwobi; (penalty scored) Sessegnon; (penalty scored) Castagne; (penalty scored) Smith Rowe; (penalty scored) Diop; (penalty missed) Cuenca; (penalty scored) Godo; (penalty scored) Benda; (penalty scored) Jiménez; (penalty scored) Lukić; (penalty scored) Berge; (penalty scored) Iwobi; (penalty scored) Sessegnon; (penalty missed) Castagne

30 October 2024 Fourth round	Preston North End	0–3	Arsenal	Preston
19:45 BST	Kesler-Hayden (yellow card) 23'; Hughes (yellow card) 55'; Þórðarson (yellow card) 73'; Frøkjær-Jensen (yellow card) 83'	Report	Jesus 24'; Nwaneri 32'; Havertz 57'	Stadium: Deepdale; Attendance: 21,811; Referee: Peter Bankes

== Statistics ==
=== Appearances and goals ===
As of match played 3 May 2025

Players with no appearances are not included on the list
Italics indicate a loaned in player

No.	Pos	Nat	Player	Total		Championship		FA Cup		EFL Cup	
No.	Pos	Nat	Player	Apps	Goals	Apps	Goals	Apps	Goals	Apps	Goals
1	GK	(England) ENG	Freddie Woodman	44	0	37+0	0	3+0	0	4+0	0
2	DF	(Scotland) SCO	Ryan Porteous	11	1	9+2	1	0+0	0	0+0	0
3	DF	(England) ENG	Jayden Meghoma	14	0	11+1	0	2+0	0	0+0	0
4	MF	(England) ENG	Benjamin Whiteman	40	0	28+8	0	2+0	0	1+1	0
5	DF	(England) ENG	Jack Whatmough	19	0	12+4	0	1+0	0	2+0	0
6	DF	(Scotland) SCO	Liam Lindsay	43	1	29+6	1	2+2	0	4+0	0
7	FW	(Republic of Ireland) IRL	Will Keane	31	4	13+14	3	3+0	1	1+0	0
8	MF	(Northern Ireland) NIR	Ali McCann	34	1	28+1	1	2+1	0	0+2	0
9	FW	(Denmark) DEN	Emil Riis Jakobsen	50	12	29+16	12	1+2	0	1+1	0
10	MF	(Denmark) DEN	Mads Frøkjær-Jensen	44	3	26+11	2	2+1	0	2+2	1
11	MF	(Republic of Ireland) IRL	Robbie Brady	32	1	17+12	0	2+0	1	1+0	0
12	FW	(Wales) WAL	Ched Evans	11	0	0+8	0	0+3	0	0+0	0
13	GK	(Wales) WAL	David Cornell	11	0	9+1	0	1+0	0	0+0	0
14	DF	(England) ENG	Jordan Storey	41	1	35+0	1	2+0	0	2+2	0
16	DF	(Wales) WAL	Andrew Hughes	47	0	37+3	0	2+2	0	3+0	0
18	MF	(England) ENG	Ryan Ledson	32	3	14+12	1	1+1	0	3+1	2
19	DF	(England) ENG	Lewis Gibson	23	1	19+0	1	4+0	0	0+0	0
20	MF	(England) ENG	Sam Greenwood	45	7	29+9	5	1+2	0	2+2	2
22	MF	(Iceland) ISL	Stefán Teitur Þórðarson	47	3	29+10	3	4+0	0	3+1	0
23	FW	(Denmark) DEN	Jeppe Okkels	10	0	1+6	0	0+0	0	2+1	0
25	MF	(United States) USA	Duane Holmes	35	1	6+23	1	2+0	0	3+1	0
26	DF	(Germany) GER	Patrick Bauer	2	0	0+1	0	0+0	0	1+0	0
28	FW	(Montenegro) MNE	Milutin Osmajić	41	15	20+14	9	3+1	3	2+1	3
29	DF	(England) ENG	Kaine Kesler-Hayden	51	2	41+3	2	1+2	0	2+2	0
31	MF	(England) ENG	Theo Mawene	1	0	0+0	0	0+1	0	0+0	0
33	DF	(England) ENG	Kian Best	3	0	0+1	0	0+0	0	0+2	0
39	DF	(England) ENG	Theo Carroll	2	0	0+1	0	0+1	0	0+0	0
44	DF	(England) ENG	Brad Potts	34	4	22+7	4	2+0	0	2+1	0
Player(s) who featured whilst on loan but returned to parent club during the season:
40	FW	(England) ENG	Josh Bowler	13	0	6+4	0	1+0	0	2+0	0
