= Youl Mawéné =

French footballer and coach (born 1979)

- Mawéné in 2026

Personal information
- Full name: Youl Mawéné
- Date of birth: 16 July 1979 (age 47)
- Place of birth: Caen, France
- Height: 6 ft 2 in (1.88 m)
- Position: Defender

Team information
- Current team: Burnley (Strength & Conditioning Coach)

Senior career*
Years	Team	Apps	(Gls)
1998–1999	Lens B	15	(0)
1999–2000	Lens	6	(0)
2000–2004	Derby County	55	(1)
2004–2010	Preston North End	174	(8)
2010–2011	Panserraikos	19	(0)
2011–2012	Aberdeen	22	(2)
2012–2013	Fleetwood Town	19	(0)
Total		310	(11)
- * Club domestic league appearances and goals

Youl Mawéné (born 16 July 1979) is a French football coach and former professional player who is the strength and conditioning coach at Burnley.

== Club career ==
=== Early career in France ===
Born in Caen, France to a DR Congolese father, Mawéné started his career at Lens. He featured in the Lens side that reached the semi-finals of the 1999–2000 UEFA Cup. However, Mawéné made only one appearance in the competition, the semi-final first leg defeat at Highbury against Arsenal, and just six more appearances in the league.

=== Move to England ===
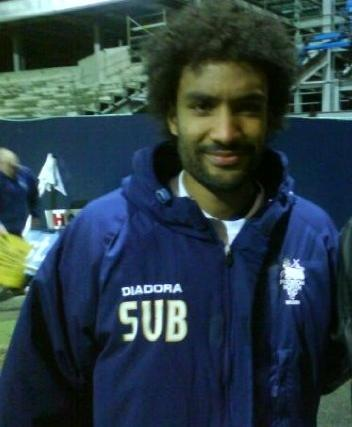
Mawéné whilst at Preston North End.

In the summer of 2000, he signed for Derby County for a fee of £500,000. He played 60 games for the Rams, scoring one goal against Southampton. In the 2003–04 season, he was Derby's Player of the Season.

In the summer of 2004, at the end of his contract with Derby, Mawéné moved to Preston North End on a free transfer. This was despite a bid from Championship rivals Wolverhampton Wanderers, for whom he had played three trial games during that summer. An ever-present in his debut season, he formed a strong partnership with Chris Lucketti. His good form that year was rewarded with the Player of the Season award. In the 2005–06 season, he formed another strong partnership with Claude Davis as Preston reached the play-offs for the second season in a row. In the 2008–09 season, Mawéné had another partnership with Sean St Ledger and occasionally Liam Chilvers, helping Preston to, again, reach the play-offs. Mawéné tore cruciate and medial knee ligaments in a pre-season match against Manchester United at Deepdale and missed the entire 2006–07 season. Pronounced fit in June 2007, he returned to the first team, with only suspensions and a brief spell on the sidelines around Christmas time preventing him from being an ever present in the side, making 42 appearances in the season.

=== Move to Greece; then Scotland ===
On 7 July 2010, Mawéné could not agree contract terms with Preston North End, after they only offered him a one-year deal, when he wanted a two-year deal. On 6 August 2010, it was confirmed that Mawéné had signed a one-year contract, with newly promoted Greek side Panserraikos, bringing an end to his 10 years in English football.

On 3 June 2011, Mawéné signed a pre-contract agreement to move to Aberdeen on a free transfer, where he played under his former Preston manager, Craig Brown. He made his debut against St Johnstone in the opening game of the season. Near the end of the 2011–12 season, Mawene was advised that his contract with Aberdeen would not be extended.

=== Return to England ===
In July 2012, he began a trial with League Two club Burton Albion, before joining Morecambe on trial, he featured in Morecambe's 2–0 pre-season victory over his former team Preston North End. On 27 July 2012, he signed for League Two newcomers Fleetwood Town. It was announced on 7 May 2013, that Mawéné would not be offered a new contract at Fleetwood, but would stay at the club as a fitness coach, a role he conducted towards the end of the 2012–13 season.

== Personal life ==
Youl's younger brother, Samy, is also a retired footballer while son Noah is a current player for Preston North End . His younger son Theo is a youth player at Brentford B.
