= Sam Greenwood (footballer) =

English footballer (born 2002)

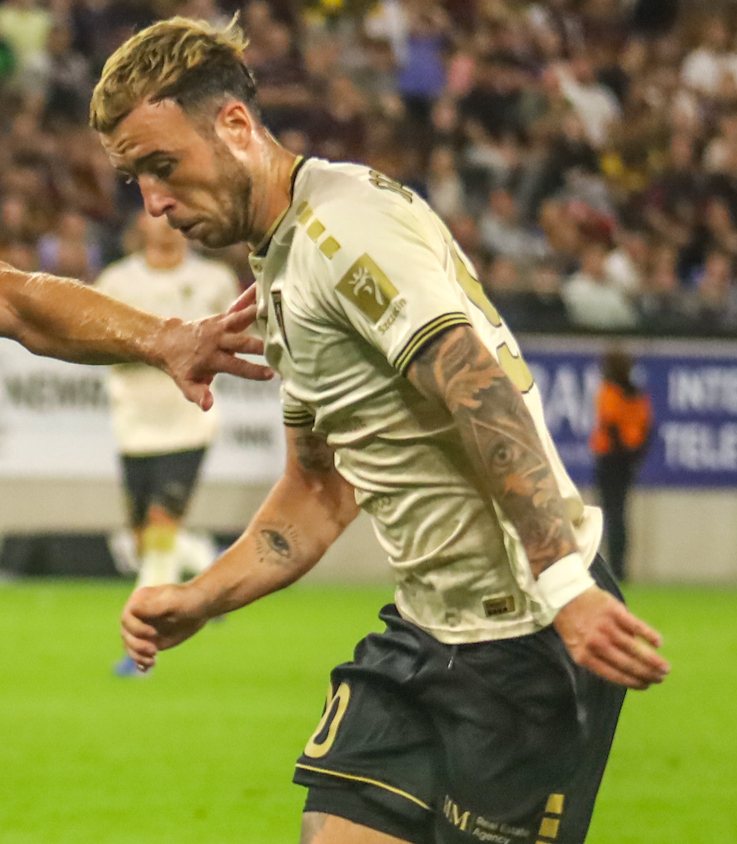
- Greenwood with Pogoń Szczecin in 2025

Personal information
- Full name: Sam Greenwood
- Date of birth: 26 January 2002 (age 24)
- Place of birth: Sunderland, England
- Height: 5 ft 11 in (1.80 m)
- Positions: Attacking midfielder; forward

Team information
- Current team: Bristol City
- Number: 20

Youth career
- Hebburn Town
- –2018: Sunderland
- 2018–2020: Arsenal
- 2020–2021: Leeds United

Senior career*
Years	Team	Apps	(Gls)
2021–2025	Leeds United	26	(1)
2023–2024	→ Middlesbrough (loan)	37	(5)
2024–2025	→ Preston North End (loan)	38	(5)
2025–2026	Pogoń Szczecin	20	(3)
2026–	Bristol City	10	(0)

International career
2017	England U16	4	(0)
2018–2019	England U17	15	(12)
2019–2020	England U18	6	(3)
2019	England U19	1	(0)
2021–2022	England U20	6	(1)
2021	England U21	1	(1)
- * Club domestic league appearances and goals as of 16 October 2026 (UTC)

Samuel James Greenwood (born 26 January 2002) is an English professional footballer who plays as an attacking midfielder or forward for EFL Championship club Bristol City.

== Early life ==
Greenwood was born in Sunderland.

== Club career ==
Greenwood started his career at Hebburn Town Juniors and Sunderland's academy, but left to join Arsenal's academy in 2018 at the age of 16, for a fee reported to be £500,000.

=== Leeds United ===
Greenwood joined Leeds United on a three-year deal on 28 August 2020 for an undisclosed fee, reported to be £1,500,000. He won the Premier League 2 player of the month award for September 2020. Greenwood made his senior Leeds debut on 10 January 2021 in the 3–0 FA Cup third round defeat against Crawley Town as a second-half substitute.

His second senior appearance for the club was in Leeds' 2–0 EFL Cup defeat at Arsenal on 26 October 2021, where he came on as a 70th minute replacement for Rodrigo. He made his Premier League debut on 18 December 2021 as a substitute in a 4–1 defeat at Arsenal. He was given his first Premier League start in the final match of the season away to Brentford on 22 May 2022, with Leeds needing to better Burnley's result to avoid relegation. Leeds won 2–1, with Greenwood playing as a central midfielder, and Burnley lost 2–1, ensuring Leeds' Premier League survival. In total, he made nine appearances across the 2021–22 season.

Greenwood's first Premier League goal came in Leeds' 4–3 win over Bournemouth at Elland Road on 5 November 2022.

=== Middlesbrough (loan) ===
On 31 August 2023, Greenwood joined fellow Championship club Middlesbrough on loan for the remainder of the 2023–24 season. On 7 October 2023, he scored his first goal for the club in a 4–0 away win over home town club Sunderland in the Tees–Wear derby.

=== Preston North End (loan) ===
On 5 July 2024, Greenwood signed a one-year loan deal with Preston North End.

=== Pogoń Szczecin ===
On 27 August 2025, Greenwood signed for Polish Ekstraklasa club Pogoń Szczecin on a three-year deal, with an option for a further year. The transfer fee was reported to be in the range of €1.8 to 2 million, making him the most expensive transfer in Pogoń's history.

=== Bristol City ===
On 25 June 2026, Greenwood moved back to England and joined Championship side Bristol City on a four-year contract.

== International career ==
Greenwood has represented England at under-16, under-17, under-18 and under-19 levels. He was a member of the England squad at the 2019 UEFA European Under-17 Championship and scored goals in all of their group games against France, Netherlands and Sweden.

On 6 September 2021, Greenwood made his debut for the England U20s during a 6–1 victory over Romania U20s at St. George's Park.

On 16 November 2021, Greenwood made a goalscoring debut on his only appearance for the England U21s as a 36th-minute substitute during the 3–2 defeat to Georgia in Batumi.

== Style of play ==
Greenwood is noted for his proficiency from dead ball situations, including an important free kick winner scored over then leaders of the Championship, Leicester City in November 2023.

== Career statistics ==
As of match played 23 May 2026

Appearances and goals by club, season and competition
Club	Season	League			National cup (Note: Includes FA Cup, Polish Cup)		League cup (Note: Includes EFL Cup)		Other		Total	
Club	Season	Division	Apps	Goals	Apps	Goals	Apps	Goals	Apps	Goals	Apps	Goals
Arsenal U21	2019–20	—			—		—		2 (Note: Appearance(s) in EFL Trophy)	0	2	0
Leeds United U21	2020–21	—			—		—		1	0	1	0
Leeds United U21	2021–22	—			—		—		1	1	1	1
Leeds United U21	2022–23	—			—		—		1	0	1	0
Leeds United U21	Total		0	0	0	0	0	0	5	1	5	1
Leeds United	2020–21	Premier League	0	0	1	0	0	0	—		1	0
Leeds United	2021–22	Premier League	7	0	1	0	1	0	—		9	0
Leeds United	2022–23	Premier League	18	1	3	0	2	0	—		23	1
Leeds United	2023–24	Championship	1	0	0	0	1	0	0	0	2	0
Leeds United	Total		26	1	5	0	4	0	0	0	35	1
Middlesbrough (loan)	2023–24	Championship	37	5	1	0	0	0	0	0	38	5
Preston North End (loan)	2024–25	Championship	38	5	3	0	4	2	0	0	45	7
Pogoń Szczecin	2025–26	Ekstraklasa	20	3	2	0	—		0	0	22	3
Career total			121	14	11	0	8	2	5	1	145	17
