= Jeppe Okkels =

Danish footballer (born 1999)

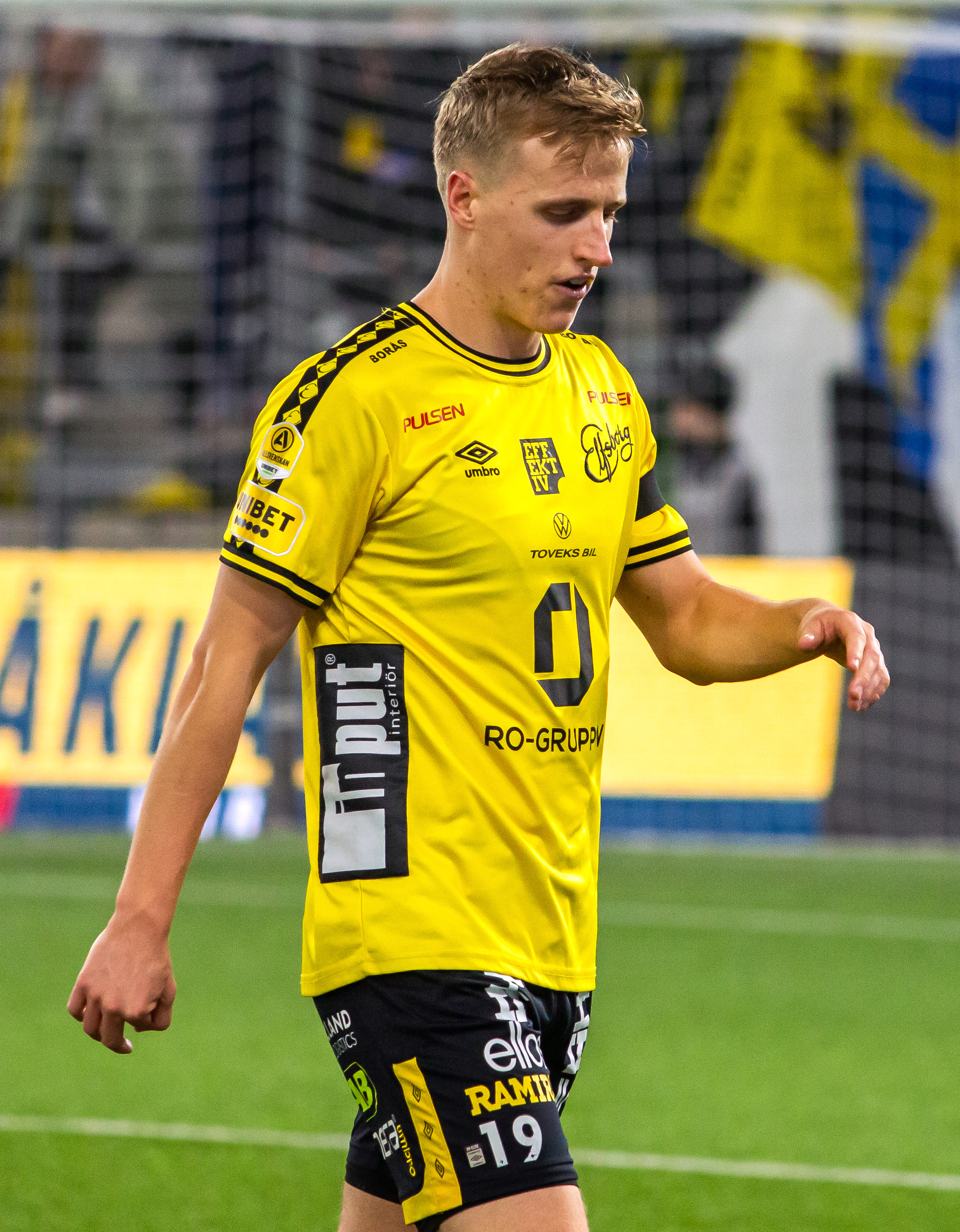
- Okkels playing for IF Elfsborg in October 2023

Personal information
- Date of birth: 27 July 1999 (age 27)
- Place of birth: Silkeborg, Denmark
- Height: 1.83 m (6 ft 0 in)
- Position: Left winger

Team information
- Current team: Djurgårdens IF
- Number: 19

Youth career
- 2003–2011: ØBG Silkeborg
- 2011–2018: Silkeborg IF

Senior career*
Years	Team	Apps	(Gls)
2016–2020	Silkeborg IF	89	(9)
2020–2024	IF Elfsborg	100	(24)
2024	Utrecht	5	(0)
2024–2025	Preston North End	7	(0)
2025	→ Aberdeen (loan)	16	(1)
2025–	Djurgårdens IF	31	(7)

International career
2014–2015	Denmark U16	7	(0)
2015–2016	Denmark U17	14	(4)
2016–2017	Denmark U18	4	(2)
2017–2018	Denmark U19	9	(3)
2019	Denmark U20	2	(0)
2020	Denmark U21	1	(1)
- * Club domestic league appearances and goals as of 11 October 2026

Jeppe Okkels (born 27 July 1999) is a Danish professional footballer who plays as a left winger for Allsvenskan club Djurgårdens IF.

== Career ==
=== Silkeborg ===
Jeppe Okkels started playing football at the age of 3–4 and moved from ØBG Silkeborg to Silkeborg IF at the age of 12, joining the club's under-13s. During the summer of 2014, he signed his first contract with Silkeborg and was called up for the U16 national team.

In the April 2015, Okkels went on a one-week trial with Bundesliga club Bayern Munich.

Okkels made his Danish 1st Division and Silkeborg debut on 28 May 2016. Okkels started on the bench, but replaced Mikkel Vendelbo in the 67th minute in a 5–0 victory against Vejle Boldklub.

=== IF Elfsborg ===
On 26 August 2020 it was confirmed, that Okkels had joined Allsvenskan club IF Elfsborg on a deal until the end of 2024. After 29 goals and 16 assists in 118 games, Okkels left Elfsborg in January 2024.

=== FC Utrecht ===
On 30 January 2024, Okkels joined Eredivisie club FC Utrecht on a deal until the end of June 2027.

=== Preston North End ===
On 13 August 2024, Okkels signed for EFL Championship club Preston North End on a three-year deal for an undisclosed fee. On August 17, 2024, Okkels made his official debut in a league match against Swansea City when he came on in the 64th minute to replace Ryan Ledson. Jeppe impressed vs Fulham in the carabo cup and scored two penalties in the 16–15 shootout victory.

On January 6, 2025, in search of more playing time, it was confirmed that Okkels joined Scottish club Aberdeen on a season-long loan deal. Aberdeen also secured an option to buy, while he was also reunited with his former Elfsborg coach, Jimmy Thelin.

== Career statistics ==
As of 19 April 2025

Appearances and goals by club, season and competition
Club	Season	League			National cup (Note: Includes Danish Cup, Svenska Cupen, Scottish Cup)		League cup (Note: Includes EFL Cup)		Other		Total	
Club	Season	Division	Apps	Goals	Apps	Goals	Apps	Goals	Apps	Goals	Apps	Goals
Silkeborg IF	2015–16	Danish 1st Division	1	0	0	0	—		—		1	0
Silkeborg IF	2016–17	Danish Superliga	7	0	1	0	—		—		8	0
Silkeborg IF	2017–18	Danish Superliga	21	0	1	0	—		3 (Note: Appearances in Danish Superliga relegation play-offs)	1	25	1
Silkeborg IF	2018–19	Danish 1st Division	31	6	0	0	—		—		31	6
Silkeborg IF	2019–20	Danish Superliga	29	3	2	0	—		—		31	3
Silkeborg IF	Total		89	9	4	0	—		3	1	38	0
IF Elfsborg	2020	Allsvenskan	11	3	4	3	—		—		15	6
IF Elfsborg	2021	Allsvenskan	30	8	6	1	—		6 (Note: Appearances in UEFA Conference League)	3	42	12
IF Elfsborg	2022	Allsvenskan	29	2	1	0	—		2	0	32	2
IF Elfsborg	2023	Allsvenskan	30	11	1	0	—		—		31	11
IF Elfsborg	Total		100	24	12	4	—		8	3	120	31
Utrecht	2023–24	Eredivisie	5	0	0	0	—		—		5	0
Preston North End	2024–25	EFL Championship	7	0	0	0	3	0	—		10	0
Aberdeen	2024–25	Scottish Premiership	12	0	2	0	0	0	—		14	0
Career total			208	33	18	4	3	0	11	4	240	41

== Honours ==
Silkeborg

- Danish 1st Division: 2018–19
