= Theo Mawene =

English footballer (born 2007)

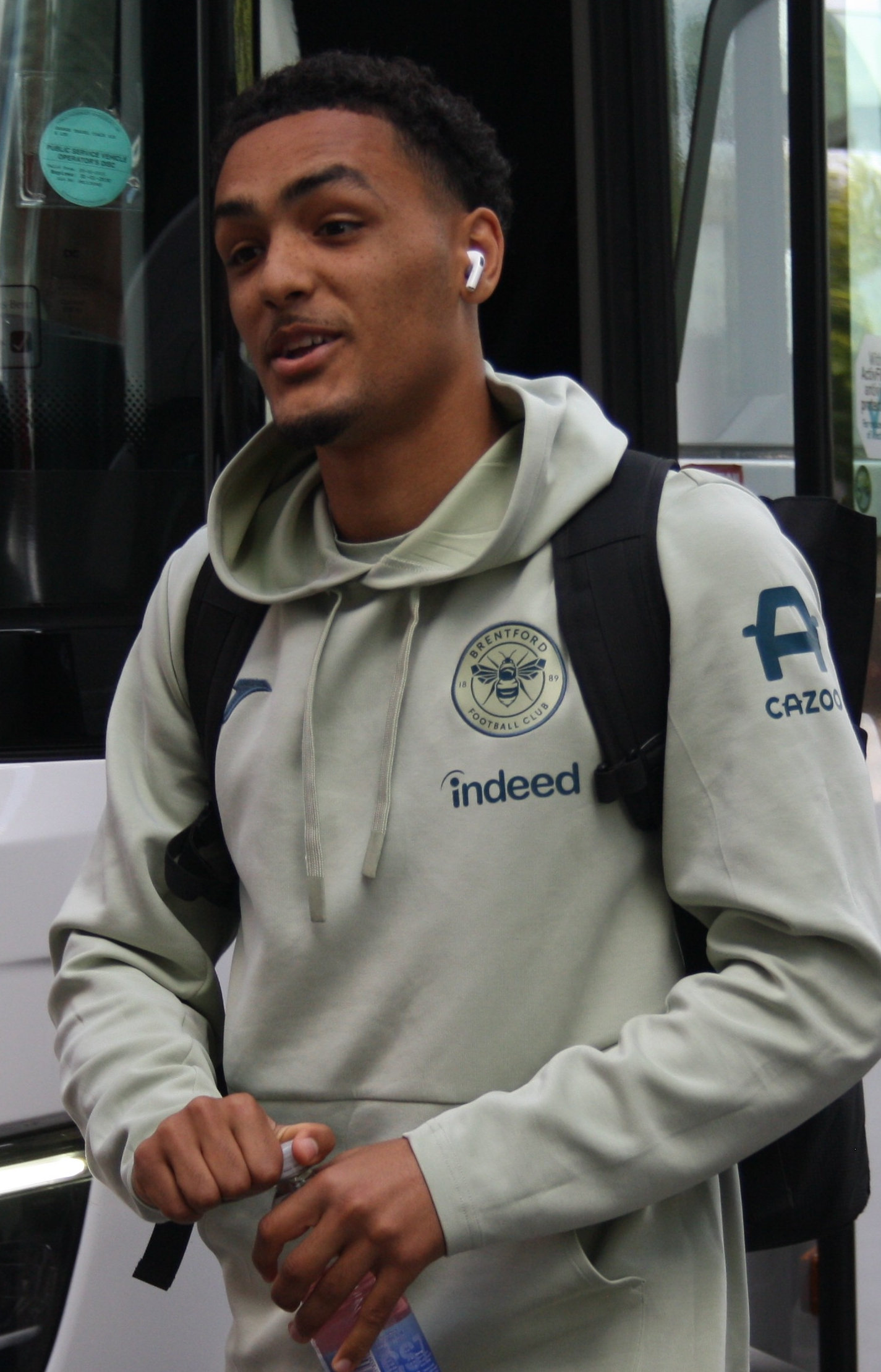
- Mawene while with Brentford B in 2026

Personal information
- Full name: Theodore Beaumont Mawene
- Date of birth: 12 July 2007 (age 19)
- Place of birth: Preston, England
- Height: 1.83 m (6 ft 0 in)
- Position: Attacking midfielder

Team information
- Current team: Brentford

Youth career
- 2020–2024: Preston North End

Senior career*
Years	Team	Apps	(Gls)
2024–2025	Preston North End	1	(0)
2025–	Brentford	0	(0)
- * Club domestic league appearances and goals as of 13:24, 15 August 2026 (UTC)

Theodore Beaumont Mawene (born 12 July 2007) is an English professional footballer who plays as an attacking midfielder for Premier League club Brentford.

Mawene is a product of the Preston North End academy and made his senior debut for the club in 2024. He transferred to Brentford in 2025.

== Career ==
=== Preston North End ===
Mawene began his youth career in the Preston North End academy at U12 level. Able to play as a central defender or wing back, he later moved into an attacking midfield role. Mawene progressed to sign a two-year scholarship deal in June 2023. His progression during the 2023–24 season was such that he joined first team training in late March 2024. Mawene was included in three late-season matchday squads and made his senior debut as a late substitute in a 3–0 Championship defeat to Leicester City on 29 April 2024. The appearance made him the club's seventh-youngest debutant.

After involvement with the first team squad during pre-season, Mawene was included in 11 matchday squads during the 2024–25 regular season and made one appearance, as a late substitute in a 3–0 FA Cup quarter-final defeat to Aston Villa on 30 March 2025. After his scholarship lapsed at the end of the 2024–25 season, the club triggered its option of a further year. Mawene transferred away from Deepdale on 19 June 2025.

=== Brentford ===
On 19 June 2025, Mawene transferred to the B team at Premier League club Brentford and signed a "long-term" contract for a "significant undisclosed fee". He made 30 appearances during the 2025–26 season and was part of the squad which finished as league phase champions of the Professional U21 Development League. Mawene made two first team friendly appearances during the 2026–27 pre-season.

== Style of play ==
Positionally, Mawene is "a ten, an attacking midfielder". In June 2023 Preston North End Head of Coaching Michael Stringfellow stated that Mawene could play at centre back, wing back and in midfield, that he was "comfortable on the ball" and that "his biggest strength is he's willing to take risks that other players are maybe not willing to take".

== Personal life ==
Mawene is the son of the French footballer Youl Mawéné and nephew of Samy Mawéné. He is of DR Congolese descent through his paternal grandfather and French descent through his paternal grandmother. His brother Noah Mawene is also a professional footballer.

== Career statistics ==
As of match played 3 May 2025

Appearances and goals by club, season and competition
Club	Season	League			National cup (Note: Includes FA Cup)		League cup (Note: Includes EFL Cup)		Total	
Club	Season	Division	Apps	Goals	Apps	Goals	Apps	Goals	Apps	Goals
Preston North End	2023–24	Championship	1	0	0	0	0	0	1	0
Preston North End	2024–25	Championship	0	0	1	0	0	0	1	0
Career total			1	0	1	0	0	0	2	0
