= Milutin Osmajić =

Montenegrin footballer

Personal information
- Date of birth: 25 July 1999 (age 27)
- Place of birth: Nikšić, Montenegro, FR Yugoslavia
- Height: 1.86 m (6 ft 1 in)
- Positions: Winger; forward

Team information
- Current team: Genoa
- Number: 18

Youth career
- Sutjeska Nikšić

Senior career*
Years	Team	Apps	(Gls)
2018–2021	Sutjeska Nikšić	82	(18)
2021–2022	Cádiz B	2	(0)
2021–2023	Cádiz	11	(0)
2022	→ Bandırmaspor (loan)	13	(7)
2022–2023	→ Vizela (loan)	31	(8)
2023–2026	Preston North End	99	(25)
2026–	Genoa	5	(3)

International career^{‡}
2018–2020	Montenegro U21	5	(3)
2020–	Montenegro	42	(11)
- * Club domestic league appearances and goals as of 15:28, 12 October 2026 (UTC) ‡ National team caps and goals as of 21:21, 15 November 2026 (UTC)

Milutin Osmajić (Montenegrin: Милутин Осмајић; born 25 July 1999) is a Montenegrin professional footballer who plays as a forward for Serie A club Genoa and the Montenegro national team.

== Club career ==
=== FK Sutjeska Nikšić ===
Osmajić began his career with FK Sutjeska Nikšić, making his senior debut in March 2018. He helped his side to win the 2018–19 Montenegrin First League, and was also the club's second-best goalscorer in 2020–21, with 13 goals.

=== Cadiz ===
On 9 July 2021, Osmajić signed a three-year deal with La Liga side Cádiz CF. He made his top tier debut on 14 August, coming on in the 70th minute for Anthony Lozano in a 1–1 draw with Levante UD.

On 31 January 2022, Osmajić was loaned to Turkish side Bandırmaspor until June. On 10 August, he switched teams and countries again after agreeing to a one-year loan deal with Portuguese Primeira Liga side F.C. Vizela.

=== Preston North End ===
On 1 September 2023, Osmajić signed for EFL Championship club Preston North End on a four-year deal, for an undisclosed fee reported to be a club record for Preston. His first goal came as the match-winner against Birmingham City on 19 September 2023 and allowed Preston to retain their spot at the top of the Championship. On 9 April 2024, he came on as a late substitute in a home game against Huddersfield Town and scored a hat-trick in six minutes to cement a 4–1 win. Without scoring a single goal in the period between the two, Osmajić scored another hat-trick for Preston in their 5-0 victory over Harrogate Town in the second round of the League Cup on 27 August 2024.

On 22 September 2024, Osmajić caught attention following a derby match against Blackburn Rovers, as imagery suggested he had bitten opposition player Owen Beck's neck; who received a red card, as he kicked-out at Duane Holmes. Osmajić received a yellow card, for dissent, during the incident. He was subsequently banned by The Football Association (FA) for eight matches and fined £15,000.

On 15 February 2025, Burnley midfielder Hannibal Mejbri accused Osmajić of racially abusing him during a match between the two clubs. The match had been delayed for several minutes in the second half after Mejbri reacted furiously to a comment that Osmajić had made. Osmajić "strongly refuted" the claim. On 17 March, he was charged by the FA for verbal assault towards Mejbri. On 7 November, Osmajić received a nine match ban after an independent panel found him guilty of racially abusing Mejbri (probability charge).

At the end of a match during injury time against Hull City on 20 January 2026, as Preston North End trailed 3–0, Osmajić headbutted Hull City player John Lundstram, resulting in Osmajić's ejection from the match. Preston North End manager Paul Heckingbottom criticized Osmajić after the match for his "lack of discipline".

=== Genoa ===
On 24 August 2026, Osmajić joined Serie A side Genoa on a permanent move for an undisclosed fee.

== International career ==
Osmajić made his international debut for Montenegro on 11 November 2020 in a friendly match against Kazakhstan.

== Career statistics ==
=== Club ===
As of match played 11 October 2026

Appearances and goals by club, season and competition
Club	Season	League			National cup (Note: Includes Montenegrin Cup, Copa del Rey, Turkish Cup, Taça de Portugal, FA Cup)		League cup (Note: Includes Taça da Liga, EFL Cup)		Other		Total	
Club	Season	Division	Apps	Goals	Apps	Goals	Apps	Goals	Apps	Goals	Apps	Goals
Sutjeska Nikšić UVF	2017–18	Montenegrin First League	13	2	0	0	—		—		13	2
Sutjeska Nikšić UVF	2018–19	Montenegrin First League	23	2	0	0	—		1 (Note: Appearance in UEFA Europa League)	0	24	2
Sutjeska Nikšić UVF	2019–20	Montenegrin First League	12	1	0	0	—		1 (Note: Appearance in UEFA Champions League)	0	13	1
Sutjeska Nikšić UVF	2020–21	Montenegrin First League	34	13	1	1	—		1	0	36	14
Sutjeska Nikšić UVF	Total		82	18	1	1	—		3	0	86	19
Cádiz B	2021–22	Segunda División RFEF	2	0	—		—		—		2	0
Cádiz	2021–22	La Liga	10	0	3	1	—		—		13	1
Cádiz	2022–23	La Liga	0	0	0	0	—		—		0	0
Cádiz	2023–24	La Liga	1	0	0	0	—		—		1	0
Cádiz	Total		11	0	3	1	—		—		14	1
Bandırmaspor (loan)	2021–22	TFF First League	13	7	1	0	—		—		14	7
Vizela (loan)	2022–23	Primeira Liga	31	8	2	0	2	0	—		35	8
Preston North End	2023–24	Championship	36	8	1	0	0	0	—		37	8
Preston North End	2024–25	Championship	34	9	3	3	3	3	—		40	15
Preston North End	2025–26	Championship	28	8	1	0	2	0	—		31	8
Preston North End	2026–27	Championship	1	0	—		1	0	—		2	0
Preston North End	Total		99	25	5	3	6	3	—		110	31
Genoa	2026–27	Serie A	5	3	0	0	—		—		5	3
Career total			243	61	12	5	8	3	3	0	266	69

=== International ===
As of match played 15 November 2026

Appearances and goals by national team and year
National team	Year	Apps	Goals
Montenegro	2020	1	0
Montenegro	2021	9	0
Montenegro	2022	3	1
Montenegro	2023	8	1
Montenegro	2024	5	0
Montenegro	2025	6	2
Montenegro	2026	9	7
Total		42	11

Scores and results list Montenegro's goal tally first.

List of international goals scored by Milutin Osmajić
No.	Date	Venue	Opponent	Score	Result	Competition
1.	28 March 2022	Podgorica City Stadium, Podgorica, Montenegro	Greece	1–0	1–0	Friendly
2.	12 October 2023	Podgorica City Stadium, Podgorica, Montenegro	Lebanon	3–1	3–2	Friendly
3.	13 October 2025	Podgorica City Stadium, Podgorica, Montenegro	Liechtenstein	1–1	2–1	Friendly
4.	17 November 2025	Podgorica City Stadium, Podgorica, Montenegro	Croatia	1–0	2–3	2026 FIFA World Cup qualification
5.	27 March 2026	Podgorica City Stadium, Podgorica, Montenegro	Andorra	2–0	2–0	Friendly
6.	31 March 2026	Podgorica City Stadium, Podgorica, Montenegro	Slovenia	1–0	3–2	Friendly
7.	31 March 2026	Podgorica City Stadium, Podgorica, Montenegro	Slovenia	2–1	3–2	Friendly
8.	5 June 2026	Košická futbalová aréna, Košice, Slovakia	Slovakia	1–1	2–2	Friendly
9.	5 June 2026	Košická futbalová aréna, Košice, Slovakia	Slovakia	2–1	2–2	Friendly
10.	25 September 2026	Podgorica City Stadium, Podgorica, Montenegro	Cyprus	2–1	2–1	2026–27 UEFA Nations League C
11.	15 November 2026	Alphamega Stadium Limassol, Cyprus	Cyprus	1–0	4–1	2026–27 UEFA Nations League C

== Honours ==
Sutjeska

- Montenegrin First League: 2018–19
