= Kaine Kesler-Hayden =

English footballer (born 2002)

Personal information
- Full name: Kaine Kesler-Hayden
- Date of birth: 23 October 2002 (age 24)
- Place of birth: Solihull, England
- Height: 1.78 m (5 ft 10 in)
- Positions: Full-back; right wing-back

Team information
- Current team: Coventry City
- Number: 20

Youth career
- –2021: Aston Villa

Senior career*
Years	Team	Apps	(Gls)
2021–2025	Aston Villa	3	(0)
2021–2022	→ Swindon Town (loan)	18	(0)
2022	→ Milton Keynes Dons (loan)	15	(1)
2022–2023	→ Huddersfield Town (loan)	14	(1)
2023–2024	→ Plymouth Argyle (loan)	24	(0)
2024–2025	→ Preston North End (loan)	44	(2)
2025–	Coventry City	23	(2)

International career
2021–2022	England U20	5	(0)
- * Club domestic league appearances and goals as of 13:56, 27 October 2026 (UTC)

Kaine Kesler-Hayden (born 23 October 2002) is an English professional footballer who plays as a full-back or right wing-back for Premier League club Coventry City.

A product of the Aston Villa Academy, he captained their under-18 side to victory in the FA Youth Cup in 2021. Kesler has represented England at under-20 level.

== Club career ==
=== Aston Villa ===
==== Early career ====
Having progressed through the club's academy system, Kesler-Hayden was named in the Aston Villa starting line-up for his senior debut on 8 January 2021 in an FA Cup third-round tie against Liverpool, after "a large number of first-team players and staff" tested positive for COVID-19, rendering Villa's first-team squad unavailable for the match. Villa lost 4–1 but were praised for their performance.

On 24 May 2021, Kesler-Hayden captained the Aston Villa U18 side which won the FA Youth Cup, beating Liverpool U18 2–1 in the final. Kesler-Hayden was later one of several academy players given five-year professional contracts by the club in July 2021.

==== Swindon Town loan ====
On 2 August 2021, Kesler-Hayden signed for Swindon Town on a season-long loan, and made his professional league debut five days later, in a 3–1 away victory over Scunthorpe United, in which he won a penalty that led to Swindon's equaliser. He received his first red card as a professional in his second appearance for Swindon, picking up a second yellow card in a 2–1 defeat to Carlisle United.

On 4 December 2021, Kesler-Hayden scored his first professional goal in a 2–1 FA Cup victory over Walsall. Kesler-Hayden featured in Swindon's third round FA Cup tie against Manchester City on 7 January 2022. Swindon were beaten 4–1, yet Kesler Hayden received widespread praise for his strong performance against the Premier League side. Two days later, on 9 January, Kesler-Hayden was recalled from his loan by Aston Villa. For his contribution on loan, Kesler-Hayden was later named Swindon Town's Young Player of the Season at the club's end of season awards ceremony.

==== Milton Keynes Dons loan ====
On 31 January 2022, Kesler-Hayden joined League One promotion contenders Milton Keynes Dons on loan for the remainder of the 2021–22 season. He made his League One debut on 8 February 2022, in a 1–1 draw against Fleetwood Town. On 22 February 2022, Kesler-Hayden scored his first goal for MK Dons, also his first professional league goal, in a 2–0 away win over Charlton Athletic. He went on to make 17 appearances for the Dons, helping them to a third-placed play-off finish.

==== Huddersfield Town loan ====
On 12 August 2022, Kesler-Hayden joined Championship club Huddersfield Town on a season-long loan. On 15 January 2023, Aston Villa recalled Kesler-Hayden from his loan. He had made 15 appearances with one goal and one assist during his loan. Huddersfield Head of Football Operations Leigh Bromby explained that the decision was made mutually between both teams with the player's best interests in mind, after Huddersfield made the signing of Matthew Lowton and Kesler-Hayden's place in the first-team was no longer guaranteed – the decision also allowing Huddersfield to use one of their loan allocations to strengthen another part of the team.

==== Plymouth Argyle loan ====
On 29 June 2023, Kesler-Hayden signed for EFL Championship club Plymouth Argyle on a season-long loan deal. In January 2024, Aston Villa exercised a recall option in his loan contract, returning to his parent side having made twenty-seven appearances.

==== Premier League debut ====
On 30 March 2024, Kesler-Hayden made his Premier League debut, as a late substitute in a 2–0 home victory over Wolverhampton Wanderers. On 3 July 2024, Kesler-Hayden signed a contract extension with Villa.

==== Preston North End loan ====
On 7 August 2024, Kesler-Hayden joined Championship club Preston North End on a season-long loan. He was named Preston North End Fans Player of the Year, Players Player of the Year and Young Player of the Year.

=== Coventry City ===
On 1 July 2025, Kesler-Hayden signed for Championship club Coventry City for an undisclosed fee, reported to be £3.5 million.

== International career ==
Kesler-Hayden was called up to a training camp for the England U19 national team in November 2020. On 6 September 2021, he made his debut for the England U20s during a 6–1 victory over Romania U20s at St. George's Park.

== Career statistics ==
As of match played 19 October 2026

Appearances and goals by club, season and competition
Club	Season	League			FA Cup		League Cup		Other		Total	
Club	Season	Division	Apps	Goals	Apps	Goals	Apps	Goals	Apps	Goals	Apps	Goals
Aston Villa U21	2020–21	—			—		—		1 (Note: Appearance in EFL Trophy)	0	1	0
Aston Villa	2020–21	Premier League	0	0	1	0	0	0	—		1	0
Aston Villa	2021–22	Premier League	0	0	0	0	0	0	—		0	0
Aston Villa	2022–23	Premier League	0	0	0	0	0	0	—		0	0
Aston Villa	2023–24	Premier League	3	0	0	0	0	0	1 (Note: Appearance in UEFA Europa Conference League)	0	4	0
Aston Villa	2024–25	Premier League	0	0	0	0	0	0	0	0	0	0
Aston Villa	Total		3	0	1	0	0	0	1	0	5	0
Swindon Town (loan)	2021–22	League Two	18	0	3	1	0	0	0	0	21	1
Milton Keynes Dons (loan)	2021–22	League One	15	1	—		—		2 (Note: Appearances in League One play-offs)	0	17	1
Huddersfield Town (loan)	2022–23	Championship	14	1	1	0	0	0	—		15	1
Plymouth Argyle (loan)	2023–24	Championship	24	0	1	0	2	0	—		27	0
Preston North End (loan)	2024–25	Championship	44	2	3	0	4	0	0	0	51	2
Coventry City	2025–26	Championship	22	2	—		2	0	—		24	1
Coventry City	2026–27	Premier League	1	0	0	0	0	0	—		1	0
Coventry City	Total		23	2	0	0	2	0	0	0	25	2
Career total			141	6	9	1	8	0	4	0	162	7

== Honours ==
Aston Villa U18

- FA Youth Cup: 2020–21

Coventry City

- EFL Championship: 2025–26

Individual

- Swindon Town Young Player of the Season: 2021–22
- Preston North End Young Player of the Season: 2024–25
- Preston North End Player of the Season: 2024–25
