= Samy-Oyame Mawene =

French footballer (born 1984)

Personal information
- Full name: Samy-Oyame Mawene
- Date of birth: 12 November 1984 (age 41)
- Place of birth: Caen, France
- Position: Midfielder

Youth career
- –2003: Lens

Senior career*
Years	Team	Apps	(Gls)
2003–2006	Caen	3	(0)
2006–2007	Millwall	4	(0)
2007–2008	Stafford Rangers	9	(0)
2008	Bury	0	(0)
2008	Stafford Rangers	9	(0)
2008–2010	Atromitos Yeroskipou		
2010–2011	Paris	22	(0)
- * Club domestic league appearances and goals

Samy-Oyame Mawene (born 12 November 1984) is a French retired professional footballer who played as a midfielder.

== Personal life ==
Mawene was born to a DR Congolese father and a French nurse. Samy's older brother, Youl, is the current Fleetwood Town fitness coach. His nephew Noah Mawene is also a professional footballer. His other nephew Theo is a youth player at Brentford B.
