= Noah Mawene =

English footballer (born 2005)

Personal information
- Full name: Noah Beaumont Mawene
- Date of birth: 1 February 2005 (age 21)
- Place of birth: Lytham St Annes, England
- Height: 1.86 m (6 ft 1 in)
- Position: Central midfielder

Team information
- Current team: Waterford (on loan from Fleetwood Town
- Number: 7

Youth career
- 2012–2018: Lytham St Anne’s YMCA
- 2018–2022: Preston North End

Senior career*
Years	Team	Apps	(Gls)
2022–2026	Preston North End	9	(0)
2024–2025	→ Newport County (loan)	14	(0)
2026	→ Southend United (loan)	3	(0)
2026–	Fleetwood Town	0	(0)
2026–	→ Waterford (loan)	11	(0)
- * Club domestic league appearances and goals as of 11:30, 9 November 2026 (UTC)

Noah Beaumont Mawene (French: Mawéné; born 1 February 2005) is an English professional footballer who plays as a central midfielder for League of Ireland Premier Division club Waterford, on loan from EFL League Two club Fleetwood Town.

== Career ==
Mawene is a youth product of Lytham Town and joined the youth academy of Preston North End as a U13, where he went on to captain their U18s; he signed his first professional contract with the club on 16 June 2021. He made his professional debut with Preston North End as a late substitute in a 4–1 EFL Championship win over Blackburn Rovers on 10 December 2022.

On 29 August 2024, Mawene joined EFL League Two club Newport County on a season-long loan deal. He made his debut for Newport on 31 August 2024 in the 1-0 League Two win against Morecambe.

On 10 March 2026, Mawene joined National League side Southend United on loan until the end of the season.

In the summer of 2026, Mawene was released by Preston North End upon the expiry of his contract, he subsequently signed for League Two club Fleetwood Town on 28 July 2026, immediately going on loan to League of Ireland Premier Division club Waterford until June 2026. On 9 October 2026, he scored the first goal of his senior career, opening the scoring in a 2–0 victory away to Bohemians in the Semi Final of the FAI Cup. On 8 November 2026, he started in the 2026 FAI Cup final as his side were defeated 1–0 by Derry City at the Aviva Stadium.

== Personal life ==
Mawene is the son of the French footballer Youl Mawéné and nephew of Samy Mawéné. He is of DR Congolese descent through his paternal grandfather, and French descent through his paternal grandmother.

His brother Theo is a youth player at Brentford.

== Career statistics ==
As of match played 8 November 2026

Appearances and goals by club, season and competition
Club	Season	League			National Cup (Note: Includes FA Cup & FAI Cup)		League Cup (Note: Includes EFL Cup)		Other		Total	
Club	Season	Division	Apps	Goals	Apps	Goals	Apps	Goals	Apps	Goals	Apps	Goals
Preston North End	2022-23	Championship	1	0	0	0	0	0	—		1	0
Preston North End	2023-24	Championship	7	0	0	0	0	0	—		7	0
Preston North End	2024-25	Championship	0	0	0	0	0	0	—		0	0
Preston North End	2025-26	Championship	1	0	0	0	0	0	—		1	0
Preston North End	Total		9	0	0	0	0	0	—		9	0
Newport County (loan)	2024-25	League Two	12	0	0	0	0	0	2 (Note: Appearance(s) in EFL Trophy)	0	14	0
Southend United (loan)	2025-26	National League	3	0	–		–		0	0	3	0
Fleetwood Town	2026–27	League Two	0	0	–		–		–		0	0
Waterford (loan)	2026	LOI Premier Division	11	0	4	1	–		–		15	1
Career total			35	0	4	1	0	0	2	0	41	1
