= AFC Bournemouth Under-21s and Academy =

Youth teams of AFC Bournemouth

Coordinates: 50°46′24″N 1°56′46″W

AFC Bournemouth Under-21s and Academy are the youth teams of Bournemouth. The reserve team is made up of under-21 players and is effectively Bournemouth's second-string side. They play in the Professional Development League Group B. The under-18 players, among other younger age groups, make up the Academy team. They play in the Youth Alliance League's Southwest Division and contest the Youth Alliance Cup.

Home fixtures for both sides are contested at the AFC Bournemouth Performance Centre in Wimborne, Bournemouth.

== Development squad ==
AFC Bournemouth Development Squad
- Full name: Athletic Football Club Bournemouth Development Squad
- Nickname: The Cherries
- Short name: AFCB
- Ground: AFC Bournemouth Performance Centre, Wimborne, Bournemouth
- Owner: Black Knight Football Club
- Chairman: Bill Foley
- Manager: Alan Connell
- League: Professional Development League
- Website: afcb.co.uk
Home colours	Away colours	Third colours

As of 8 September 2026

Note: Flags indicate national team as defined under FIFA eligibility rules; some limited exceptions apply. Players may hold more than one non-FIFA nationality.

No.	Pos.	Nation	Player
46	GK	SCO	Callan McKenna
51	MF	ECU	Malcom Dacosta
53	MF	WAL	Charlie Stevens
55	GK	ENG	Mack Allan
56	DF	ENG	Harold William
57	FW	ENG	Jonny Stuttle
58	DF	ENG	Ameer Ali
59	MF	ENG	Ethan Sills

No.	Pos.	Nation	Player
60	FW	ENG	Jonny Day
61	MF	GEO	George Chubinidze
—	GK	ENG	Kai Crampton
—	GK	ENG	Ben Westcott
—	DF	FRA	Jaheim Azzouz Scafe
—	DF	AUS	Max Lyall-Rajendra
—	DF	IRL	Ade Solanke
—	MF	ENG	Ben Winterburn

=== Out on loan ===
Note: Flags indicate national team as defined under FIFA eligibility rules; some limited exceptions apply. Players may hold more than one non-FIFA nationality.

No.	Pos.	Nation	Player
45	DF	USA	Matai Akinmboni (at Dundee until 30 June 2027)

== U21 honours ==
=== Regional ===
- Hampshire Senior Cup
  - Winners: 2020
  - Runners-up: 2017

== Under-18s ==
AFC Bournemouth Under-18s
- Full name: Athletic Football Club Bournemouth Under-18s
- Nickname: The Cherries
- Short name: AFCB
- Ground: AFC Bournemouth Performance Centre, Wimborne, Bournemouth
- Owner: Black Knight Football Club
- Chairman: Bill Foley
- Manager: James Lowy
- League: Youth Alliance League, Southwest Division
- Website: afcb.co.uk
Home colours	Away colours	Third colours

As of 8 September 2026

Note: Flags indicate national team as defined under FIFA eligibility rules; some limited exceptions apply. Players may hold more than one non-FIFA nationality.

No.	Pos.	Nation	Player
—	GK	IRL	Adam Brogan
—	GK	ENG	Zach Melin
—	GK	ENG	Will Upstell
—	DF	ENG	Jeffery Aibangbee
—	DF	ENG	Jake Drewett
—	DF	VEN	Aidan Guanchez
—	DF	ENG	Zach Sutton
—	DF	ENG	Alfie Thomas
—	DF	ENG	Harry Webb
—	MF	ENG	Kelvin Arthur
—	MF	ENG	Max Collins
—	MF	ENG	Damani Kearney
—	MF	ENG	Tom Robinson

No.	Pos.	Nation	Player
—	MF	ENG	Joe Spence
—	MF	ENG	Tom Stuckey
—	MF	ENG	Levi Tindall
—	MF	ENG	Leyland Waite
—	FW	NGR	Kobaro Akaunu
—	FW	ALG	Jalil Conteh
—	FW	ENG	Denzel Decardi-Nelson
—	FW	POL	Marko Gasiorowski
—	FW	ENG	Dane Ndimukum
—	FW	GHA	Eugene Nyarko
—	FW	ENG	Adrian Oluwande
—	FW	ENG	Nefeye Osazee

=== Out on loan ===
Note: Flags indicate national team as defined under FIFA eligibility rules; some limited exceptions apply. Players may hold more than one non-FIFA nationality.

No.	Pos.	Nation	Player
—	GK	ENG	Danny Dixon (at Winchester City until 30 June 2027)
—	DF	ENG	Alfie Merritt (at Newport County until 30 June 2027)

== U18 honours ==
=== Leagues ===
- Youth Alliance South-West Division
  - Winners: 2014–15, 2019–20, 2021–22, 2022–23
- Youth Alliance Merit League Three
  - Winners: 2020–21

=== Cups ===
- Youth Alliance Cup
  - Winners: 2016–17

== Notable products ==
Bournemouth's Academy has produced numerous players throughout its history who have gone on to make professional appearances during their careers – be it for Bournemouth or another professional side.

The following is a list of those players ordered by the year they signed their first professional contract with the club. Appearances and goals are for Bournemouth only. Players highlighted in bold are still currently contracted to the club.

As of 8 September 2026

Year	Player	Position	League		FA Cup		League Cup		Other	
Year	Player	Position	Apps	Goals	Apps	Goals	Apps	Goals	Apps	Goals
1964	(England) John Hold	Striker	85	25						
1968	(England) Eddie Rowles	Striker	66	12						
1969	(Wales) David Jones	Centre-back	?	?						
1975	(England) Steve Gritt	Central Midfielder	6	3						
1984	(England) Billy Clark	Centre-back	4	0						
1986	(England) Adrian Randall	Central Midfielder	3	0	0	0	0	0	3	0
1988	(England) Matty Holmes	Central Midfielder	114	8	10	0	7	0	5	0
1990	(England) Jamie Redknapp	Central Midfielder	13	0	3	0	3	0	2	0
1993	(England) Neil Moss	Goalkeeper	186	0	18	0	7	0	12	0
1994	(England) Eddie Howe	Centre-back	271	12	16	2	15	1	11	0
1996	(England) Anthony Griffin	Right-back	5	0	0	0	0	0	0	0
1996	(England) James Hayter	Striker	359	93	21	5	12	4	15	5
1997	(Wales) Carl Fletcher	Central Midfielder	193	19	16	1	6	0	9	3
1998	(England) Steve Lovell	Striker	16	1	0	0	1	1	3	2
1999	(Wales) Brian Stock	Central Midfielder	146	16	11	1	5	1	10	1
2004	(England) James Coutts	Central Midfielder	12	0	1	0	2	0	1	0
2004	(England) Brett Pitman	Striker	267	96	15	3	10	1	9	2
2006	(Northern Ireland) Josh McQuoid	Striker	104	13	11	5	2	0	6	0
2006	(Wales) Sam Vokes	Striker	54	16	2	0	1	0	2	0
2007	(Wales) Joe Partington	Right-back	52	2	3	0	1	0	3	0
2008	(England) Steve Hutchings	Attacking Midfielder	1	0	Stats are set to be updated soon. These stats have not yet been segmented by competition.					
2008	(England) Carl Preston	Central Midfielder	2	0	Stats are set to be updated soon. These stats have not yet been segmented by competition.					
2008	(England) George Webb	Attacking Midfielder	2	0	Stats are set to be updated soon. These stats have not yet been segmented by competition.					
2009	(England) Danny Ings	Striker	29	8	Stats are set to be updated soon. These stats have not yet been segmented by competition.					
2009	(England) Jayden Stockley	Striker	18	0	Stats are set to be updated soon. These stats have not yet been segmented by competition.					
2009	(England) Dan Thomas	Goalkeeper	3	0	Stats are set to be updated soon. These stats have not yet been segmented by competition.					
2011	(Scotland) Josh Carmichael	Central Midfielder	4	0	Stats are set to be updated soon. These stats have not yet been segmented by competition.					
2011	(England) Alex Parsons	Striker	1	0	Stats are set to be updated soon. These stats have not yet been segmented by competition.					
2011	(England) Jordan Seabright	Goalkeeper	0	0	Stats are set to be updated soon. These stats have not yet been segmented by competition.					
2011	(England) Dan Strugnell	Right-back	1	0	Stats are set to be updated soon. These stats have not yet been segmented by competition.					
2011	(England) Josh Wakefield	Attacking Midfielder	4	0	Stats are set to be updated soon. These stats have not yet been segmented by competition.					
2011	(England) Elliot Ward	Central Midfielder	1	0	Stats are set to be updated soon. These stats have not yet been segmented by competition.					
2012	(Saudi Arabia) Jamal Bajandouh	Defensive Midfielder	0	0	Stats are set to be updated soon. These stats have not yet been segmented by competition.					
2012	(England) Baily Cargill	Centre-back	11	0	Stats are set to be updated soon. These stats have not yet been segmented by competition.					
2012	(England) Jordan Chiedozie	Striker	0	0	Stats are set to be updated soon. These stats have not yet been segmented by competition.					
2013	(England) Harry Cornick	Striker	1	0	Stats are set to be updated soon. These stats have not yet been segmented by competition.					
2013	(England) Brandon Goodship	Striker	0	0	Stats are set to be updated soon. These stats have not yet been segmented by competition.					
2014	(England) Ben Whitfield	Attacking Midfielder	0	0	Stats are set to be updated soon. These stats have not yet been segmented by competition.					
2015	(England) Matt Butcher	Defensive Midfielder	2	0	Stats are set to be updated soon. These stats have not yet been segmented by competition.					
2015	(Australia) Jordan Holmes	Goalkeeper	0	0	Stats are set to be updated soon. These stats have not yet been segmented by competition.					
2015	(Republic of Ireland) Joe Quigley	Striker	0	0	Stats are set to be updated soon. These stats have not yet been segmented by competition.					
2015	(England) Jack Simpson	Centre-back	26	1	Stats are set to be updated soon. These stats have not yet been segmented by competition.					
2015	(England) Sam Surridge	Striker	12	2	Stats are set to be updated soon. These stats have not yet been segmented by competition.					
2016	(England) Shaun Hobson	Centre-back	0	0	Stats are set to be updated soon. These stats have not yet been segmented by competition.					
2016	(England) Corey Jordan	Centre-back	1	0	Stats are set to be updated soon. These stats have not yet been segmented by competition.					
2016	(England) Sam Matthews	Right Midfielder	0	0	Stats are set to be updated soon. These stats have not yet been segmented by competition.					
2016	(England) Matt Worthington	Central Midfielder	1	0	Stats are set to be updated soon. These stats have not yet been segmented by competition.					
2017	(Romania) Alex Dobre	Left Midfielder	1	0	Stats are set to be updated soon. These stats have not yet been segmented by competition.					
2017	(Nigeria) Nnamdi Ofoborh	Defensive Midfielder	3	0	Stats are set to be updated soon. These stats have not yet been segmented by competition.					
2017	(England) Kyle Taylor	Attacking Midfielder	2	0	Stats are set to be updated soon. These stats have not yet been segmented by competition.					
2017	(Republic of Ireland) Mark Travers	Goalkeeper	70	0	Stats are set to be updated soon. These stats have not yet been segmented by competition.					
2018	(Republic of Ireland) Gavin Kilkenny	Central Midfielder	15	0	Stats are set to be updated soon. These stats have not yet been segmented by competition.					
2019	(England) Christian Saydee	Striker	2	0	Stats are set to be updated soon. These stats have not yet been segmented by competition.					
2020	(England) Jaidon Anthony	Left Midfielder	83	10	Stats are set to be updated soon. These stats have not yet been segmented by competition.					
2020	(England) Zeno Ibsen Rossi	Centre-back	4	0	Stats are set to be updated soon. These stats have not yet been segmented by competition.					
2020	(Zimbabwe) Jordan Zemura	Left-back	54	3	Stats are set to be updated soon. These stats have not yet been segmented by competition.					
2022	(Wales) Owen Bevan	Centre-back	1	0	Stats are set to be updated soon. These stats have not yet been segmented by competition.					
2023	(England) Remy Rees-Dottin	Striker	1	0	Stats are set to be updated soon. These stats have not yet been segmented by competition.					
2024	(England) **Ben Winterburn**	Central midfielder	5	0	Stats are set to be updated soon. These stats have not yet been segmented by competition.					

=== Players who have played at international level ===
A number of players who have come through the youth ranks at Bournemouth have also represented their country at both senior and youth levels. The following is a list of those players and their respective appearance and goal records.

As of 8 September 2026

Player	National team	Apps	Goals
(England) Jamie Redknapp	England	17	1
(England) Jamie Redknapp	England	1	0
(England) Jamie Redknapp	England U-21s	18	5

Player	National team	Apps	Goals
(England) Danny Ings	England	3	1
(England) Danny Ings	England U-21s	13	4

Player	National team	Apps	Goals
(Wales) Sam Vokes	Wales	64	11
(Wales) Sam Vokes	Wales U-21s	14	4

Player	National team	Apps	Goals
(Wales) Carl Fletcher	Wales	36	1

Player	National team	Apps	Goals
(Wales) David Jones	Wales	8	0

Player	National team	Apps	Goals
(Wales) Brian Stock	Wales	3	0
(Wales) Brian Stock	Wales U-21s	2	0

Player	National team	Apps	Goals
(Northern Ireland) Josh McQuoid	Northern Ireland	5	0
(Northern Ireland) Josh McQuoid	Northern Ireland B	1	0
(Northern Ireland) Josh McQuoid	Northern Ireland U-21s	8	2
(Northern Ireland) Josh McQuoid	Northern Ireland U-19s	4	0

Player	National team	Apps	Goals
(Republic of Ireland) Mark Travers	Ireland	4	0
(Republic of Ireland) Mark Travers	Ireland U-19s	9	0
(Republic of Ireland) Mark Travers	Ireland U-18s	6	0
(Republic of Ireland) Mark Travers	Ireland U-17s	7	0
(Republic of Ireland) Mark Travers	Ireland U-16s	2	0

Player	National team	Apps	Goals
(Saudi Arabia) Jamal Bajandouh	Saudi Arabia	1	0

Player	National team	Apps	Goals
(England) Brandon Goodship	England C	1	0

Player	National team	Apps	Goals
(England) Sam Surridge	England U-21s	2	1

Player	National team	Apps	Goals
(England) Eddie Howe	England U-21s	2	0

Player	National team	Apps	Goals
(England) Jack Simpson	England U-21s	1	0

Player	National team	Apps	Goals
(Wales) Joe Partington	Wales U-21s	8	0
(Wales) Joe Partington	Wales U-19s	11	2
(Wales) Joe Partington	Wales U-17s	2	0

Player	National team	Apps	Goals
(Republic of Ireland) Joe Quigley	Ireland U-21s	5	0

Player	National team	Apps	Goals
(Australia) Jordan Holmes	Australia U-21s	5	0
(Australia) Jordan Holmes	Australia U-20s	7	0

Player	National team	Apps	Goals
(Romania) Alex Dobre	Romania U-21s	8	1
(Romania) Alex Dobre	Romania U-17s	3	0

Player	National team	Apps	Goals
(England) Baily Cargill	England U-20s	7	1

Player	National team	Apps	Goals
(Nigeria) Nnamdi Ofoborh	Nigeria U-20s	3	0

Player	National team	Apps	Goals
(Scotland) Josh Carmichael	Scotland U-19s	1	0
(Scotland) Josh Carmichael	Scotland U-16s	1	0
