= 2026–27 Professional U18 Development League =

U18 Premier League
- Season: 2026–27
- Dates: 15 August 2026 – 8 May 2027
- Matches: 153
- Goals: 730 (4.77 per match)
- Top goalscorer: Oliver Boast (Tottenham Hotspur U18s) (16 Goals)
- Biggest home win: Liverpool U18s 7–0 Sunderland U18s (31 October 2026)
- Biggest away win: Blackburn Rovers U18s 0–8 Nottingham Forest U18s (22 August 2026)
- Highest scoring: Stoke City U18s 5–8 Manchester City U18s (29 August 2026)
- Longest winning run: 9 Games; Manchester City U18s
- Longest unbeaten run: 10 Games; Fulham U18s
- Longest winless run: 7 Games; Wolverhampton Wanderers U18s; Leicester City U18s
- Longest losing run: 6 Games; Wolverhampton Wanderers U18s
- All statistics correct as of 21 November 2026.

The 2026–27 Professional U18 Development League is the 15th season of the Professional Development League system.

There are 31 teams competing, divided into North and South divisions according to their region.

== North ==
| Pos | Team | Pld | W | D | L | GF | GA | GD | Pts | |
|---|---|---|---|---|---|---|---|---|---|---|
| 1 | Manchester City U18s | 9 | 9 | 0 | 0 | 39 | 10 | +29 | 27 | Qualification for the National Final |
| 2 | Manchester United U18s | 10 | 7 | 1 | 2 | 35 | 9 | +26 | 22 | |
| 3 | Newcastle United U18s | 10 | 6 | 0 | 4 | 26 | 20 | +6 | 18 | |
| 4 | Nottingham Forest U18s | 9 | 5 | 2 | 2 | 20 | 9 | +11 | 17 | |
| 5 | Middlesbrough U18s | 10 | 5 | 2 | 3 | 25 | 19 | +6 | 17 | |
| 6 | Derby County U18s | 10 | 5 | 1 | 4 | 18 | 22 | −4 | 16 | |
| 7 | Liverpool U18s | 9 | 4 | 3 | 2 | 30 | 22 | +8 | 15 | |
| 8 | Leeds United U18s | 10 | 4 | 0 | 6 | 22 | 26 | −4 | 12 | |
| 9 | Burnley U18s | 10 | 3 | 2 | 5 | 18 | 22 | −4 | 11 | |
| 10 | Sunderland U18s | 9 | 3 | 1 | 5 | 15 | 31 | −16 | 10 | |
| 11 | Everton U18s | 8 | 3 | 0 | 5 | 15 | 17 | −2 | 9 | |
| 12 | Blackburn Rovers U18s | 10 | 3 | 0 | 7 | 8 | 36 | −28 | 9 | |
| 13 | Wolverhampton Wanderers U18s | 9 | 2 | 1 | 6 | 14 | 22 | −8 | 7 | |
| 14 | Stoke City U18s | 10 | 2 | 1 | 7 | 20 | 32 | −12 | 7 | |
| 15 | Leicester City U18s | 7 | 0 | 4 | 3 | 9 | 17 | −8 | 4 | |

Updated to match(es) played on 21 November 2026. Source: League Under 18 Table

=== Matches ===
| Home \ Away | BLB | BUR | DER | EVE | LEE | LEI | LIV | MNC | MNU | MID | NEW | NFO | STK | SUN | WOL |
|---|---|---|---|---|---|---|---|---|---|---|---|---|---|---|---|
| Blackburn Rovers U18s | — | 6 Mar | 24 Apr | 2–1 | 10 Apr | 8 May | 12 Dec | 0–6 | 1–4 | 22 Feb | 6 Feb | 0–8 | 19 Dec | 1–2 | 23 Jan |
| Burnley U18s | 4–0 | — | 16 Jan | 17 Apr | 30 Jan | 20 Mar | 13 Feb | 13 Mar | 0–6 | 28 Nov | 27 Feb | 2–2 | 0–1 | 2–2 | 9 Jan |
| Derby County U18s | 28 Nov | 1–4 | — | 3 Apr | 13 Mar | 17 Apr | 3–3 | 1–5 | 20 Mar | 6 Feb | 23 Jan | 0–2 | 13 Feb | 1 May | 27 Feb |
| Everton U18s | 30 Jan | 12 Dec | 10 Apr | — | 6–1 | 16 Jan | 24 Apr | 0–6 | 0–3 | 1 May | 13 Mar | 0–1 | 27 Feb | 9 Jan | 13 Feb |
| Leeds United U18s | 0–1 | 1–3 | 1–2 | 23 Jan | — | 3–1 | 9 Jan | 6 Feb | 28 Nov | 3–1 | 20 Mar | 1 May | 17 Apr | 6 Mar | 2–1 |
| Leicester City U18s | 9 Jan | 6 Apr | 12 Dec | 5 Dec | 13 Feb | — | 27 Feb | 10 Apr | 1 May | 23 Jan | 1–4 | 13 Mar | 2–2 | 24 Apr | 1–1 |
| Liverpool U18s | 17 Apr | 4–2 | 20 Feb | 28 Nov | 8 May | 2–2 | — | 23 Jan | 6 Mar | 2–2 | 19 Dec | 9 Mar | 20 Mar | 7–0 | 6 Feb |
| Manchester City U18s | 20 Mar | 2–1 | 6 Mar | 20 Feb | 5–1 | 3 Apr | 2–1 | — | 16 Jan | 9 Jan | 28 Nov | 17 Apr | 30 Jan | 4–1 | 1 May |
| Manchester United U18s | 13 Mar | 10 Apr | 2–3 | 6 Feb | 24 Apr | 19 Dec | 6–3 | 0–1 | — | 5–0 | 13 Feb | 27 Feb | 8 May | 12 Dec | 6–0 |
| Middlesbrough U18s | 5–0 | 24 Apr | 1–3 | 19 Dec | 27 Feb | 2–2 | 16 Jan | 8 May | 30 Jan | — | 3–1 | 13 Feb | 13 Mar | 5–1 | 10 Apr |
| Newcastle United U18s | 6–1 | 3–0 | 3–1 | 1–3 | 2–7 | 30 Jan | 1 May | 24 Apr | 0–2 | 6 Mar | — | 9 Jan | 3–2 | 20 Feb | 12 Dec |
| Nottingham Forest U18s | 16 Jan | 20 Feb | 30 Jan | 6 Mar | 19 Dec | 3–0 | 10 Apr | 12 Dec | 1–1 | 0–1 | 8 May | — | 3–1 | 3 Apr | 0–4 |
| Stoke City U18s | 1 May | 23 Jan | 0–2 | 3–1 | 12 Dec | 20 Feb | 3–4 | 5–8 | 9 Jan | 2–5 | 16 Jan | 6 Feb | — | 10 Apr | 24 Apr |
| Sunderland U18s | 27 Feb | 6 Feb | 19 Dec | 8 May | 4–3 | 28 Nov | 13 Mar | 13 Feb | 17 Apr | 20 Mar | 0–3 | 23 Jan | 4–1 | — | 1–5 |
| Wolverhampton Wanderers U18s | 0–2 | 8 May | 1–2 | 0–4 | 16 Jan | 6 Mar | 2–4 | 19 Dec | 20 Feb | 5 Dec | 17 Apr | 20 Mar | 28 Nov | 30 Jan | — |

Updated to match(es) played on 21 November 2026. Source: Premier League Under 18 Results
Legend: Blue = home team win; Yellow = draw; Red = away team win.

== South ==
| Pos | Team | Pld | W | D | L | GF | GA | GD | Pts | |
|---|---|---|---|---|---|---|---|---|---|---|
| 1 | Chelsea U18s | 11 | 8 | 0 | 3 | 45 | 19 | +26 | 24 | Qualification for the National Final |
| 2 | Brighton & Hove Albion U18s | 11 | 6 | 3 | 2 | 27 | 25 | +2 | 21 | |
| 3 | Tottenham Hotspur U18s | 10 | 6 | 2 | 2 | 40 | 16 | +24 | 20 | |
| 4 | Fulham U18s | 10 | 5 | 5 | 0 | 37 | 26 | +11 | 20 | |
| 5 | Southampton U18s | 11 | 6 | 2 | 3 | 34 | 23 | +11 | 20 | |
| 6 | West Ham United U18s | 10 | 6 | 2 | 2 | 28 | 23 | +5 | 20 | |
| 7 | Arsenal U18s | 10 | 6 | 1 | 3 | 21 | 17 | +4 | 19 | |
| 8 | Brentford U18s | 11 | 4 | 1 | 6 | 31 | 32 | −1 | 13 | |
| 9 | Bournemouth U18s | 11 | 3 | 4 | 4 | 23 | 30 | −7 | 13 | |
| 10 | Aston Villa U18s | 10 | 3 | 3 | 4 | 21 | 20 | +1 | 12 | |
| 11 | Crystal Palace U18s | 10 | 3 | 3 | 4 | 23 | 23 | 0 | 12 | |
| 12 | Ipswich Town U18s | 10 | 3 | 1 | 6 | 20 | 29 | −9 | 10 | |
| 13 | Norwich City U18s | 10 | 2 | 2 | 6 | 19 | 31 | −12 | 8 | |
| 14 | West Bromwich Albion U18s | 10 | 2 | 2 | 6 | 16 | 30 | −14 | 8 | |
| 15 | Reading U18s | 11 | 1 | 3 | 7 | 17 | 38 | −21 | 6 | |
| 16 | Birmingham City U18s | 10 | 1 | 2 | 7 | 14 | 34 | −20 | 5 | |

Updated to match(es) played on 21 November 2026. Source: Premier League Under 18 Table

=== Matches ===
| Home \ Away | ARS | AVL | BIR | BOU | BRE | BHA | CHE | CRY | FUL | IPS | NOR | REA | SOU | TOT | WBA | WHU |
|---|---|---|---|---|---|---|---|---|---|---|---|---|---|---|---|---|
| Arsenal U18s | — | 6 Mar | 17 Apr | 28 Nov | 6–4 | 23 Jan | 20 Mar | 2–0 | 1 May | 1–3 | 20 Feb | 9 Jan | 1–0 | 2–1 | 6 Feb | 16 Feb |
| Aston Villa U18s | 1–3 | — | 20 Mar | 2–2 | 30 Jan | 2–4 | 5 Dec | 1–0 | 16 Jan | 13 Mar | 9 Jan | 17 Apr | 1 May | 28 Nov | 13 Feb | 27 Feb |
| Birmingham City U18s | 12 Dec | 2–2 | — | 0–2 | 24 Apr | 1–3 | 1–4 | 10 Apr | 27 Feb | 0–3 | 1 May | 13 Feb | 16 Feb | 23 Jan | 13 Mar | 0–3 |
| Bournemouth U18s | 24 Apr | 6 Feb | 6 Mar | — | 1–3 | 7–4 | 20 Feb | 2–2 | 3 Apr | 23 Jan | 1–0 | 1 May | 10 Apr | 1–3 | 12 Dec | 2–2 |
| Brentford U18s | 13 Mar | 0–5 | 28 Nov | 13 Feb | — | 1–2 | 8 May | 19 Dec | 4–5 | 3–0 | 20 Mar | 27 Feb | 6 Feb | 17 Apr | 3–0 | 23 Jan |
| Brighton & Hove Albion U18s | 2–1 | 20 Feb | 6 Feb | 16 Jan | 10 Apr | — | 1–5 | 1–1 | 2–2 | 12 Dec | 6 Mar | 30 Jan | 3–2 | 9 Jan | 24 Apr | 1 May |
| Chelsea U18s | 5–0 | 10 Apr | 16 Jan | 5–0 | 9 Jan | 13 Feb | — | 24 Apr | 30 Jan | 4–1 | 2–3 | 6–1 | 12 Dec | 1 May | 27 Feb | 13 Mar |
| Crystal Palace U18s | 13 Feb | 23 Jan | 5 Dec | 20 Mar | 1 May | 13 Mar | 28 Nov | — | 3–3 | 27 Feb | 17 Apr | 5–3 | 1–4 | 2–4 | 9 Jan | 6 Feb |
| Fulham U18s | 19 Dec | 5–5 | 4–2 | 8 May | 6 Mar | 20 Mar | 4–3 | 20 Feb | — | 6 Feb | 2 Feb | 28 Nov | 3–3 | 2–2 | 23 Jan | 17 Apr |
| Ipswich Town U18s | 16 Jan | 1–3 | 30 Jan | 6–2 | 20 Feb | 17 Apr | 6 Mar | 2–6 | 2–5 | — | 28 Nov | 20 Mar | 1–4 | 10 Mar | 1 May | 9 Jan |
| Norwich City U18s | 1–5 | 8 May | 19 Dec | 27 Feb | 2–2 | 2–4 | 6 Feb | 12 Dec | 10 Apr | 24 Apr | — | 13 Mar | 23 Jan | 1–6 | 0–2 | 13 Feb |
| Reading U18s | 8 May | 12 Dec | 1–2 | 19 Dec | 2–5 | 1–1 | 0–3 | 6 Mar | 24 Apr | 1–1 | 2–2 | — | 20 Feb | 6 Feb | 10 Apr | 2–5 |
| Southampton U18s | 30 Jan | 19 Dec | 8 May | 3–3 | 4–2 | 27 Feb | 17 Apr | 16 Jan | 13 Mar | 13 Feb | 7–4 | 2–3 | — | 20 Mar | 3–1 | 28 Nov |
| Tottenham Hotspur U18s | 27 Feb | 24 Apr | 8–2 | 13 Mar | 12 Dec | 8 May | 19 Dec | 30 Jan | 13 Feb | 10 Apr | 16 Jan | 6–1 | 1–2 | — | 7–1 | 2–2 |
| West Bromwich Albion U18s | 0–0 | 2–0 | 4–4 | 17 Apr | 16 Jan | 28 Nov | 3–5 | 8 May | 0–4 | 19 Dec | 30 Jan | 5 Dec | 6 Mar | 20 Feb | — | 20 Mar |
| West Ham United U18s | 10 Apr | 1–0 | 20 Feb | 30 Jan | 5–4 | 19 Dec | 5–3 | 1–3 | 12 Dec | 8 May | 0–4 | 16 Jan | 24 Apr | 6 Mar | 4–3 | — |

Updated to match(es) played on 21 November 2026. Source: Premier League Under 18 Results
Legend: Blue = home team win; Yellow = draw; Red = away team win.

== Season statistics ==
=== Top goalscorers ===
| Rank | Player | Club | Goals |
|---|---|---|---|
| 1 | (England) Oliver Boast | Tottenham Hotspur U18s | 16 |
| 2 | (England) Logan White | Leeds United U18s | 13 |
| 3 | (England) Dexter Oliver | Manchester City U18s | 12 |
| 4 | (England) Finn Inglethorpe | Liverpool U18s | 11 |
| 5 | (England) Wyatt Comley | Southampton U18s | 9 |
| 5 | (England) Donte Martin | Crystal Palace U18s | 9 |
| 5 | (England) Warren Taylor | Burnley U18s | 9 |
| 8 | (Republic of Ireland) Chris Atherton | Ipswich Town U18s | 8 |
| 8 | (Spain) Jaume Camacho | Manchester United U18s | 8 |
| 8 | (Scotland) Alfie Hutchinson | Newcastle United U18s | 8 |
| 8 | (England) Jai Nwosu | Brentford U18s | 8 |

=== Hat-tricks ===
| Player | For | Against | Result | Date | Ref. |
|---|---|---|---|---|---|
| (England) Khai Vally | Fulham U18s | Ipswich Town U18s | 2–5 (A) | 15 August 2026 | |
| (England) Kahlil Steele | Norwich City U18s | Chelsea U18s | 2–3 (A) | 19 August 2026 | |
| (England) Dane Ndimukum^{4} | Bournemouth U18s | Brighton & Hove Albion U18s | 7–4 (H) | 22 August 2026 | |
| (Republic of Ireland) Chris Atherton | Ipswich Town U18s | Arsenal U18s | 1–3 (A) | 22 August 2026 | |
| (England) Warren Taylor | Burnley U18s | Derby County U18s | 1–4 (A) | 22 August 2026 | |
| (England) Andrew Pennie | Chelsea U18s | Reading U18s | 6–1 (H) | 29 August 2026 | |
| (Northern Ireland) Luke Hawe | Southampton U18s | Norwich City U18s | 7–4 (H) | 29 August 2026 | |
| (England) Jai Nwosu | Brentford U18s | West Ham United U18s | 5–4 (A) | 29 August 2026 | |
| (England) Dexter Oliver^{4} | Manchester City U18s | Leeds United U18s | 5–1 (H) | 29 August 2026 | |
| (Wales) Louie Bradbury | Stoke City U18s | Leeds United U18s | 5–8 (H) | 5 September 2026 | |
| (England) Timeo Whisker | Manchester City U18s | Stoke City U18s | 5–8 (A) | 5 September 2026 | |
| (England) Dexter Oliver | Manchester City U18s | Stoke City U18s | 5–8 (A) | 5 September 2026 | |
| (Scotland) Alfie Hutchison | Newcastle United U18s | Leicester City U18s | 1–4 (A) | 5 September 2026 | |
| (England) Jashayde Mensah-Greenwood | Chelsea U18s | Brighton & Hove Albion U18s | 1–5 (A) | 12 September 2026 | |
| (England) Dexter Oliver^{4} | Manchester City U18s | Everton U18s | 0–6 (A) | 19 September 2026 | |
| (England) Oliver Boast ^{4} | Tottenham Hotspur U18s | West Bromwich Albion U18s | 7–1 (H) | 19 September 2026 | |
| (England) Donte Martin | Crystal Palace U18s | Ipswich Town U18s | 2–6 (A) | 17 October 2026 | |
| (England) Harry French | West Bromwich Albion U18s | Chelsea U18s | 3–5 (H) | 17 October 2026 | |
| (Spain) Juame Camacho^{4} | Manchester United U18s | Liverpool U18s | 6–3 (H) | 24 October 2026 | |
| (Canada) Aidan Evans | Fulham U18s | Brentford U18s | 4–5 (A) | 24 October 2026 | |
| (England) Donte Martin | Crystal Palace U18s | Reading U18s | 5–3 (H) | 24 October 2026 | |
| (England) Kai Rooney^{4} | Manchester United U18s | Burnley U18s | 0–6 (A) | 27 October 2026 | |
| (England) Rickey Jackson | Wolverhampton Wanderers U18s | Sunderland U18s | 1–5 (A) | 28 October 2026 | |
| (England) Vincent Joseph | Arsenal U18s | Brentford U18s | 6–4 (H) | 31 October 2026 | |
| (England) Jai Nwosu | Brentford U18s | Arsenal U18s | 6–4 (A) | 31 October 2026 | |
| (England) Finn Inglethorpe | Liverpool U18s | Sunderland U18s | 6–4 (A) | 31 October 2026 | |
| (England) James Barker^{4} | Sunderland U18s | Stoke City U18s | 4–1 (H) | 3 November 2026 | |
| (England) Logan White | Leeds United U18s | Newcastle United U18s | 2–7 (A) | 21 November 2026 | |
| (England) Teddie Lamb | Manchester City U18s | Blackburn Rovers U18s | 0–6 (A) | 21 November 2026 | |

Note

(H) – Home; (A) – Away
^{4} – player scored 4 goals

== Professional Development League ==
U18 Professional Development League 2
- Season: 2026–27
- Dates: 15 August 2026 – 24 April 2027
- Matches: 80
- Goals: 321 (4.01 per match)
- Top goalscorer: (England) Charlie Bulmer (Sheffield United U18s) (11 Goals)
- Biggest home win: Cardiff City U18s 7–0 Hull City U18s (12 September 2026)
- Biggest away win: Wigan Athletic U18s 0–6 Swansea City U18s (22 August 2026)
- Highest scoring: Queens Park Rangers U18s 3–7 Sheffield United U18s (15 August 2026)
- Longest winning run: 4 Games; Swansea City U18s
- Longest unbeaten run: 6 Games; Charlton Athletic U18s
- Longest winless run: 7 Games; Colchester United U18s; Coventry City U18s
- Longest losing run: 3 Games; Bristol City U18s; Coventry City U18s; Hull City U18s; Sheffield Wednesday U18s
- All statistics correct as of 21 November 2026.

The Professional Development League, sometimes known as the Professional Development League 2, is Under-18 football's second tier, designed for those academies with Category 2 status. The league once split regionally into north and south divisions, with each team facing opponents in their own region twice, both home and away, and opponents in the other region once, resulting in 28 games played. Now the league goes into a single table. Charlton Athletic U18s are the defending champions. 17 teams compete in the league this season, three fewer than the previous season and tied for the lowest amount of teams in the league's history. Two teams joined the Premier League 2 with Category One status with AFC Bournemouth U18s, and Brentford U18s joined after being promoted to Category One status after 3, and 2 seasons as Category Two Academies respectively, with Brentford playing 6 seasons in the league total. While 2 Academies downgraded themselves to Category Three, with founding member Crewe Alexandra U18s after 14 seasons, alongside Watford U18s after 11 seasons. However, Bolton Wanderers U18s returned after being granted Category Two academy status after 6 years.

=== Tables ===
==== North Division ====
| Pos | Team | Pld | W | D | L | GF | GA | GD | Pts |
|---|---|---|---|---|---|---|---|---|---|
| 1 | Bolton Wanderers U18s | 9 | 4 | 3 | 2 | 27 | 17 | +10 | 15 |
| 2 | Sheffield United U18s | 10 | 4 | 3 | 3 | 27 | 22 | +5 | 15 |
| 3 | Barnsley U18s | 8 | 4 | 1 | 3 | 14 | 11 | +3 | 13 |
| 4 | Sheffield Wednesday U18s | 9 | 4 | 1 | 4 | 14 | 22 | −8 | 13 |
| 5 | Hull City U18s | 10 | 4 | 0 | 6 | 13 | 23 | −10 | 12 |
| 6 | Huddersfield Town U18s | 8 | 3 | 2 | 3 | 14 | 17 | −3 | 11 |
| 7 | Wigan Athletic U18s | 10 | 3 | 2 | 5 | 16 | 25 | −9 | 11 |
| 8 | Peterborough United U18s | 9 | 2 | 3 | 4 | 14 | 16 | −2 | 9 |
| 9 | Fleetwood Town U18s | 9 | 1 | 1 | 7 | 12 | 24 | −12 | 4 |

Updated to match(es) played on 21 November 2026. Source: Premier League Under 18 PDL Table

==== South Division ====
| Pos | Team | Pld | W | D | L | GF | GA | GD | Pts |
|---|---|---|---|---|---|---|---|---|---|
| 1 | Swansea City U18s | 10 | 7 | 2 | 1 | 35 | 13 | +22 | 23 |
| 2 | Charlton Athletic U18s | 10 | 7 | 1 | 2 | 24 | 14 | +10 | 22 |
| 3 | Millwall U18s | 9 | 5 | 3 | 1 | 22 | 13 | +9 | 18 |
| 4 | Cardiff City U18s | 9 | 4 | 1 | 4 | 21 | 16 | +5 | 13 |
| 5 | Queens Park Rangers U18s | 10 | 4 | 1 | 5 | 19 | 25 | −6 | 13 |
| 6 | Coventry City U18s | 10 | 2 | 4 | 4 | 20 | 24 | −4 | 10 |
| 7 | Colchester United U18s | 10 | 1 | 7 | 2 | 16 | 22 | −6 | 10 |
| 8 | Bristol City U18s | 10 | 2 | 3 | 5 | 13 | 17 | −4 | 9 |

Updated to match(es) played on 21 November 2026. Source: Premier League Under 18 PDL Table

=== Matches ===
| Home \ Away | BAR | BOL | BRI | CAR | CHA | COL | COV | FLE | HUD | HUL | MIL | PET | QPR | SHU | SHW | SWA | WIG |
|---|---|---|---|---|---|---|---|---|---|---|---|---|---|---|---|---|---|
| Barnsley U18s | — | 19 Feb | | 23 Apr | | 3 Apr | 20 Mar | 27 Nov | 1–2 | 0–1 | | 2–1 | 1–2 | 9 Jan | 5 Feb | | 6 Mar |
| Bolton Wanderers U18s | 19 Dec | — | | 1–3 | 24 Apr | | 12 Dec | 13 Feb | 6 Mar | 9 Jan | 20 Mar | 2–2 | | 23 Jan | 6–1 | 1–2 | 4–1 |
| Bristol City U18s | 0–2 | 2–2 | — | 16 Jan | 0–2 | 13 Feb | | | 1–1 | | 20 Feb | 20 Mar | 28 Nov | | 10 Apr | 3–1 | |
| Cardiff City U18s | | | 3–0 | — | 20 Feb | 28 Nov | 13 Feb | 1–2 | | 7–0 | 2–2 | | 23 Jan | 20 Mar | | 12 Dec | 10 Apr |
| Charlton Athletic U18s | 10 Apr | | 23 Jan | 5–1 | — | 9 Jan | 28 Nov | | 3–1 | | 2–0 | 3–2 | 6 Mar | | 20 Mar | 13 Feb | |
| Colchester United U18s | | 10 Apr | 1–1 | 6 Feb | 3–3 | — | 20 Feb | 24 Apr | | 0–3 | 12 Dec | | 2–0 | 3–3 | | 23 Jan | 20 Mar |
| Coventry City U18s | | 3 Apr | 6 Mar | 3–1 | 6 Feb | 2–2 | — | | 24 Apr | | 23 Jan | | 9 Jan | 1–4 | | 3–3 | 2–3 |
| Fleetwood Town U18s | 23 Jan | 12 Dec | 0–3 | | 1–3 | | 10 Apr | — | 9 Jan | 20 Feb | | 0–2 | 20 Mar | 1–2 | 0–1 | | 3–3 |
| Huddersfield Town U18s | 13 Mar | 2–5 | | 0–3 | | 1–1 | | 4–3 | — | 27 Feb | 10 Apr | 19 Dec | | 13 Feb | 16 Jan | 20 Mar | 23 Jan |
| Hull City U18s | 16 Jan | 1–3 | 3–2 | | 2–1 | | 1–2 | 19 Dec | 0–3 | — | | 23 Jan | 10 Apr | 1–3 | 6 Mar | | 13 Feb |
| Millwall U18s | 17 Apr | | 2–1 | 9 Jan | 16 Jan | 6 Mar | 2–2 | 3 Apr | | 24 Apr | — | 2–0 | 13 Feb | | 5–2 | 28 Nov | |
| Peterborough United U18s | 27 Feb | 13 Mar | | 17 Apr | | 2–2 | 1–1 | 6 Feb | 20 Feb | 28 Nov | | — | | 2–0 | 12 Dec | 10 Apr | 2–4 |
| Queens Park Rangers U18s | | 3–3 | 6 Feb | 3–0 | 12 Dec | 16 Jan | 5–3 | | 3 Apr | | 1–5 | 24 Apr | — | 3–7 | | 20 Feb | 0–1 |
| Sheffield United U18s | 2–4 | 28 Nov | 3 Apr | | 1–2 | | | 16 Jan | 12 Dec | 6 Feb | 3–3 | 6 Mar | | — | 20 Feb | 24 Apr | 2–2 |
| Sheffield Wednesday U18s | 27 Mar | 27 Feb | | 3 Apr | | 2–2 | 2–1 | 13 Mar | 25 Nov | 2–1 | | 13 Feb | 0–1 | 19 Dec | — | | 9 Jan |
| Swansea City U18s | 2–2 | | 9 Jan | 6 Mar | 3–0 | 5–0 | 16 Jan | 5–2 | | 3 Apr | 6 Feb | | 3–1 | | 5–1 | — | |
| Wigan Athletic U18s | 1–2 | 6 Feb | 24 Apr | | 3 Apr | | | 27 Feb | 28 Nov | 12 Dec | 0–1 | 16 Jan | | 13 Mar | 1–3 | 0–6 | — |

Updated to match(es) played on 31 October 2026. Source: Premier League Under 18 PDL Results
Legend: Blue = home team win; Yellow = draw; Red = away team win.

=== Top goalscorers ===
As of 24 October 2026

| Rank | Player | Club | Goals |
|---|---|---|---|
| 1 | (England) Charlie Bulmer | Sheffield United U18s | 11 |
| 2 | (England) Regan Anderson | Millwall U18s | 8 |
| 3 | (England) Charlie Hughes | Wigan Athletic U18s | 7 |
| 4 | (England) Daniel Ogburu | Bolton Wanderers U18s | 6 |
| 4 | (Wales) Leo Papirnyk | Cardiff City U18s | 6 |
| 6 | (Wales) Alex Godfrey | Swansea City U18s | 5 |
| 7 | (Wales) Alfie Baxter | Bolton Wanderers U18s | 4 |
| 7 | (England) Zaion Christian | Charlton Athletic U18s | 4 |
| 7 | (England) Sonny Coyne | Bolton Wanderers U18s | 4 |
| 7 | (England) Quines Fakhy | Bolton Wanderers U18s | 4 |
| 7 | (England) Fortune Fontoh | Huddersfield Town U18s | 4 |
| 7 | (England) Noah Kalema | Colchester United U18s | 4 |
| 7 | (England) Patrick Key | Huddersfield Town U18s | 4 |
| 7 | (England) Kalaab Meron | Swansea City U18s | 4 |
| 7 | (Nigeria) Kayode Peterkin | Charlton Athletic U18s | 4 |
| 7 | (England) Raynon Richman | Charlton Athletic U18s | 4 |
| 7 | (England) Lucas Tobin | Wigan Athletic U18s | 4 |
| 7 | (England) Jayden Twum | Charlton Athletic U18s | 4 |

=== Hat-tricks ===
As of 10 October 2026

| Player | For | Against | Result | Date | Ref. |
|---|---|---|---|---|---|
| (England) Charlie Bulmer^{4} | Sheffield United U18s | Queens Park Rangers U18s | 3–7 (A) | 15 August 2026 | |
| (England) Charlie Hughes | Wigan Athletic U18s | Coventry City U18s | 2–3 (A) | 26 September 2026 | |
| (England) Denver Clement | Bolton Wanderers U18s | Huddersfield Town U18s | 2–5 (A) | 10 October 2026 | |
| (England) Patrick Key^{4} | Huddersfield Town U18s | Fleetwood Town U18s | 4–3 (H) | 24 October 2026 | |
| (Wales) Alex Godfrey | Swansea City U18s | Colchester United U18s | 5–0 (H) | 31 October 2026 | |
| (England) Regan Anderson | Millwall U18s | Queens Park Rangers U18s | 1–5 (A) | 21 November 2026 | |

Note

(H) – Home; (A) – Away
^{4} – player scored 4 goals

== EFL Youth Alliance ==
Football League Youth Alliance
- Season: 2026–27
- Champions: Northeast Division North West Division South East Division South West Division Play-off Champion
- Matches: 241
- Goals: 1,000 (4.15 per match)
- Biggest home win: Wrexham U18s 8–0 Salford City U18s 22 September 2026; Salford City U18s 8–0 Morecambe U18s 17 October 2026
- Biggest away win: Morecambe U18s 0–10 Rotherham United U18s 20 October 2026
- Highest scoring: Morecambe U18s 0–10 Rotherham United U18s 20 October 2026
- Longest winning run: Stockport County U18s; 9 Games
- Longest unbeaten run: Stockport County U18s; 10 Games
- Longest winless run: Luton Town U18s; Swindon Town U18s; Newport County U18s; 10 games
- Longest losing run: Newport County U18s; 10 Games
- All statistics correct as of 17 November 2026.

League 2 is run by the Football League under the auspices of the Football League Youth Alliance. This is for academies that are Category Three and Four in the EPPP. The competition consists of the Under-18 sides from the Category Three and Category Four Academy Clubs of the EFL and Premier League, along with selected National League Clubs. 43 Academies competed this season, 1 more than the previous season. For clubs that get relegated to the National League, they have two years to gain promotion back to the EFL. Otherwise, they lose their license with the League. Forest Green Rovers and Sutton United did not return after their parent club lost their EPPP license and would not participate this season. Bolton Wanderers U18s left after being granted Category Two academy status after 6 seasons. York City U18s and Rochdale U18s joined after their first team was promoted, as well as Crewe Alexandra U18s and Watford U18s when both clubs downgraded their academies to Category Three. The format returned to the Division format for the northern league, while the southern league would play one big table and the winners of the divisions would play in a 4 team playoff to determine the national champion.

=== League stage ===
==== North West Division ====
| Pos | Team | Pld | W | D | L | GF | GA | GD | Pts |
|---|---|---|---|---|---|---|---|---|---|
| 1 | Wrexham | 11 | 9 | 1 | 1 | 40 | 11 | +29 | 28 |
| 2 | Stockport County | 10 | 9 | 1 | 0 | 29 | 10 | +19 | 28 |
| 3 | Salford City | 13 | 8 | 0 | 5 | 32 | 26 | +6 | 24 |
| 4 | Crewe Alexandra | 9 | 7 | 1 | 1 | 31 | 7 | +24 | 22 |
| 5 | Preston North End | 11 | 5 | 2 | 4 | 22 | 16 | +6 | 17 |
| 6 | Carlisle United | 10 | 5 | 2 | 3 | 24 | 20 | +4 | 17 |
| 7 | Walsall | 12 | 4 | 2 | 6 | 22 | 25 | −3 | 14 |
| 8 | Port Vale | 12 | 3 | 5 | 4 | 19 | 28 | −9 | 14 |
| 9 | Shrewsbury Town | 12 | 4 | 1 | 7 | 15 | 19 | −4 | 13 |
| 10 | Morecambe | 13 | 3 | 1 | 9 | 16 | 64 | −48 | 10 |
| 11 | Blackpool | 10 | 1 | 5 | 4 | 22 | 25 | −3 | 8 |
| 12 | Rochdale | 9 | 1 | 0 | 8 | 11 | 41 | −30 | 3 |

Updated to match(es) played on 21 November 2026. Source: soccerway.com

==== North East Division ====
| Pos | Team | Pld | W | D | L | GF | GA | GD | Pts |
|---|---|---|---|---|---|---|---|---|---|
| 1 | Doncaster Rovers | 12 | 7 | 1 | 4 | 35 | 26 | +9 | 22 |
| 2 | Oldham Athletic | 12 | 6 | 3 | 3 | 28 | 21 | +7 | 21 |
| 3 | Lincoln City | 11 | 6 | 2 | 3 | 30 | 25 | +5 | 20 |
| 4 | Burton Albion | 12 | 5 | 4 | 3 | 35 | 21 | +14 | 19 |
| 5 | Grimsby Town | 9 | 5 | 1 | 3 | 17 | 18 | −1 | 16 |
| 6 | Mansfield Town | 11 | 4 | 3 | 4 | 21 | 16 | +5 | 15 |
| 7 | Bradford City | 11 | 4 | 1 | 6 | 22 | 21 | +1 | 13 |
| 8 | Rotherham United | 12 | 3 | 2 | 7 | 23 | 31 | −8 | 11 |
| 9 | Chesterfield | 12 | 2 | 3 | 7 | 13 | 24 | −11 | 9 |
| 10 | York City | 11 | 1 | 5 | 5 | 16 | 19 | −3 | 8 |
| 11 | Notts County | 11 | 2 | 2 | 7 | 16 | 25 | −9 | 8 |

Updated to match(es) played on 21 November 2026. Source: soccerway.com

==== South Division ====
| Pos | Team | Pld | W | D | L | GF | GA | GD | Pts |
|---|---|---|---|---|---|---|---|---|---|
| 1 | Plymouth Argyle | 12 | 8 | 2 | 2 | 44 | 25 | +19 | 26 |
| 2 | Wycombe Wanderers | 11 | 8 | 1 | 2 | 27 | 16 | +11 | 25 |
| 3 | Exeter City | 13 | 8 | 1 | 4 | 36 | 26 | +10 | 25 |
| 4 | Portsmouth | 13 | 7 | 3 | 3 | 31 | 22 | +9 | 24 |
| 5 | Gillingham | 10 | 7 | 2 | 1 | 33 | 15 | +18 | 23 |
| 6 | Northampton Town | 12 | 6 | 4 | 2 | 20 | 15 | +5 | 22 |
| 7 | Barnet | 13 | 6 | 3 | 4 | 26 | 22 | +4 | 21 |
| 8 | Cheltenham Town | 13 | 6 | 1 | 6 | 29 | 24 | +5 | 19 |
| 9 | Stevenage | 13 | 5 | 2 | 6 | 19 | 24 | −5 | 17 |
| 10 | AFC Wimbledon | 9 | 5 | 1 | 3 | 25 | 16 | +9 | 16 |
| 11 | Bristol Rovers | 13 | 3 | 6 | 4 | 22 | 21 | +1 | 15 |
| 12 | Watford | 11 | 5 | 0 | 6 | 26 | 31 | −5 | 15 |
| 13 | Cambridge United | 11 | 4 | 2 | 5 | 24 | 26 | −2 | 14 |
| 14 | Bromley | 11 | 4 | 1 | 6 | 20 | 23 | −3 | 13 |
| 15 | Oxford United | 10 | 3 | 3 | 4 | 15 | 16 | −1 | 12 |
| 16 | Milton Keynes Dons | 10 | 2 | 3 | 5 | 15 | 26 | −11 | 9 |
| 17 | Luton Town | 11 | 1 | 5 | 5 | 17 | 24 | −7 | 8 |
| 18 | Leyton Orient | 10 | 2 | 2 | 6 | 17 | 28 | −11 | 8 |
| 19 | Swindon Town | 10 | 0 | 4 | 6 | 9 | 23 | −14 | 4 |
| 20 | Newport County | 10 | 0 | 0 | 10 | 6 | 38 | −32 | 0 |

Updated to match(es) played on 21 November 2026. Source: soccerway.com
