= 2025–26 Walsall F.C. season =

English association football club season

Walsall
2025–26 season
- Owner: Trivela Group
- Co-chairman: Benjamin Boycott, Leigh Pomlett
- Head Coach: Mat Sadler (until 11 March); Darren Byfield (from 11 March)
- Stadium: Bescot Stadium
- League Two: 9th
- FA Cup: Third round
- EFL Cup: First round
- EFL Trophy: Round of 16
- Top goalscorer: League: Daniel Kanu (15); All: Daniel Kanu (18)

The 2025–26 season is the 138th season in the history of Walsall Football Club and their seventh consecutive season in League Two. The club are participating in League Two, the FA Cup, the EFL Cup, and the EFL Trophy.

== Managerial changes ==
On 11 March, Mat Sadler was sacked as manager after nearly three years, and one hundred sixty-one matches in charge.

== Transfers and contracts ==
=== In ===
Date	Pos.	Player	From	Fee	Ref.
11 June 2025	CB	(England) Harrison Burke	(England) Chester	Undisclosed	
26 June 2025	CF	(Scotland) Aaron Pressley	(England) Stevenage	Undisclosed	
1 July 2025 (Note: The transfer was announced on 9 June, and would become official on July 1 once his contract at Eastbourne had expired)	CM	(Jamaica) Courtney Clarke	(England) Eastbourne Borough	Compensation	
1 July 2025 (Note: The transfer was announced on 17 June, and would become official on July 1 once his contract at Airdrieonians had expired)	CB	(England) Mason Hancock	(Scotland) Airdrieonians	Free	
1 July 2025 (Note: The transfer was announced on 26 June, and would become official on July 1 once his contract at Exeter City had expired)	LB	(Kenya) Vincent Harper	(England) Exeter City	Free	
21 July 2025	CB	(England) Aden Flint	(England) Mansfield Town	Free	
28 July 2025	CAM	(Australia) Jake Hollman	(Australia) Macarthur	Free	
1 August 2025	CM	(England) Lewis Warrington	(England) Leyton Orient	Free	
14 November 2025	CF	(Jamaica) Kemar Roofe	(England) Derby County	Free	
7 January 2026	CM	(England) Alex Pattison	(England) Bradford City	Undisclosed	
30 January 2026	CM	(England) Alfie Chang	(England) Birmingham City	Free	
4 February 2026	CM	(New Zealand) Jago Godden	(England) Bedford Town	Free	

=== Out ===
Date	Pos.	Player	To	Fee	Ref.
26 June 2025	CB	(England) Taylor Allen	(England) Wycombe Wanderers	Undisclosed	
21 July 2025	CB	(Republic of Ireland) David Okagbue	(England) Peterborough United	Undisclosed	
8 January 2026	CF	(England) Levi Amantchi	(England) Gateshead	Free Transfer	

=== Loaned in ===
Date	Pos.	Player	From	Date until	Ref.
30 June 2025	GK	(England) Myles Roberts	(England) Watford	31 May 2026	
1 July 2025	CF	(England) Jonny Stuttle	(England) Bournemouth	22 August 2025 (Note: On 22 August, Stuttle was recalled to Bournemouth due to a lengthy injury he sustained)	
18 July 2025	CB	(Wales) Daniel Cox	(England) Derby County	5 January 2026 (Note: On 5 January, Cox was recalled to his parent club Derby)	
18 August 2025	MF	(England) Ryan Finnigan	(England) Blackpool	5 January 2026 (Note: On 5 January, Finnigan was recalled to his parent club Blackpool)	
22 August 2025	CF	(Sierra Leone) Daniel Kanu	(England) Charlton Athletic	31 May 2026	
1 September 2025	RB	(Germany) Jid Okeke	(England) Stockport County	5 January 2026 (Note: On 5 January, Okeke was recalled to his parent club Stockport)	
1 September 2025	MF	(England) Rico Richards	(England) Port Vale	31 May 2026	
15 January 2026	CF	(England) Aaron Loupalo-Bi	(England) Fulham	31 May 2026	
15 January 2026	CB	(Poland) Kacper Łopata	(England) Barnsley	31 May 2026	
2 February 2026	RB	(Germany) Jid Okeke	(England) Stockport County	31 May 2026	

=== Loaned out ===
Date	Pos.	Player	To	Date until	Ref.
18 July 2025	CF	(England) Charlie Wragg	(England) Halesowen Town	31 May 2026	
25 July 2025	CF	(England) Levi Amantchi	(England) Rochdale	3 January 2026	
7 August 2025	GK	(England) Jenson Kilroy	(England) Evesham United	4 September 2025	
7 August 2025	CM	(England) Dylan Thomas	(England) Worcester City	4 September 2025	
1 September 2025	CF	(England) Josh Gordon	(England) Barrow	31 May 2026	
3 October 2025	CM	(England) Dylan Thomas	(England) Stratford Town	31 October 2025	
4 October 2025	LM	(Republic of Ireland) Ronan Maher	(England) Tamworth	31 May 2026 (Note: On 30 December, Maher's loan at Tamworth was extended by a further month. Then on 30 January, the loan was extended until the end of the season)	
31 October 2025	GK	(England) Jenson Kilroy	(England) Hungerford Town	29 November 2025	
13 December 2025	GK	(England) Jenson Kilroy	(England) Alvechurch	10 January 2026	
23 December 2025	GK	(England) Fraser Hamilton-Wright	(England) Smethwick Rangers	20 January 2026	
23 December 2025	CB	(England) Ellis Harris	(England) Tividale	20 January 2026	
23 December 2025	CM	(England) McLloyd Oben	(England) Rugby Town	20 January 2026	
23 December 2025	CB	(Poland) Jakub Pawlowski	(England) Rugby Town	20 January 2026	
23 December 2025	CM	(England) Marley Roberts	(England) Racing Club Warwick	20 January 2026	
4 February 2026	CM	(New Zealand) Jago Godden	(Republic of Ireland) Drogheda	1 January 2027	
14 February 2026	CAM	(England) Will Etheridge	(England) Stourbridge	14 March 2026	
7 March 2026	GK	(England) Jenson Kilroy	(England) Rushall Olympic	26 April 2026 (Note: On 8 April, Kilroy's loan at Rushall Olympic was extended for a further two-and-a-half weeks)	

=== Released / Out of Contract ===
Date	Pos.	Player	Subsequent club	Join date	Ref.
30 June 2025	CB	(Montserrat) Donervon Daniels	(England) Oldham Athletic	1 July 2025	
30 June 2025	CM	(England) Jack Earing	(England) Barrow	1 July 2025	
30 June 2025	LB	(Guyana) Liam Gordon	(England) Port Vale	1 July 2025	
30 June 2025	CB	(Republic of Ireland) Oisin McEntee	(Scotland) Heart of Midlothian	1 July 2025	
30 June 2025	CDM	(Wales) Ryan Stirk	(England) Chesterfield	1 July 2025	
30 June 2025	GK	(England) George Barrett	(England) Ipswich	4 August 2025	
30 June 2025	CF	(England) Douglas James-Taylor	(Republic of Ireland) Bohemians	1 July 2025	
30 June 2025	CF	(England) Danny Johnson	(England) Hartlepool	4 July 2025	
1 February 2026	CM	(England) Lewis Warrington	(England) Tranmere Rovers	1 February 2026	

=== New Contract ===
Date	Pos.	Player	Contract until	Ref.
11 June 2025	GK	(England) Jenson Kilroy	Undisclosed (Note: First professional contract)	
20 June 2025	LM	(Republic of Ireland) Ronan Maher	30 June 2027	
24 June 2025	RM	(Ghana) Albert Adomah	30 June 2026	
26 June 2025	CF	(Jamaica) Jamille Matt	30 June 2026	
28 June 2025	CB	(England) Priestley Farquharson	30 June 2026 (Note: Option for a further year)	
28 June 2025	GK	(England) Sam Hornby	30 June 2027	
10 September 2025	CB	(England) Harry Williams	30 June 2027	
23 March 2026	CB	(England) Stan Straw	Undisclosed	

== Pre-season and friendlies ==
On 8 May, Walsall announced their first pre-season friendly, against Premier League side Aston Villa. A month later, a second fixture was confirmed against Leamington. Two more were added against Derby County and Hereford. On 17 June, a fifth fixture was added to the schedule, against Forest Green Rovers.

Win Draw Loss Fixtures

8 July 2025 Friendly	Leamington	0–4	Walsall	Bishop's Tachbrook
19:30 BST		Report	Wragg 53', 60'; Pressley 80'; Gordon 86'	Stadium: New Windmill Ground; Attendance: 702

12 July 2025 Friendly	Walsall	3–0	Hereford	Essington
12:30 BST	Pressley; Gordon; Lakin	Report		Stadium: Essington Training Ground; Attendance: 0 (Behind-closed-doors)

16 July 2025 Friendly	Walsall	1–0	Aston Villa	Bescot
19:30 BST	Burke 38'	Report		Stadium: Bescot Stadium; Attendance: 9,500 (3,980 away)

19 July 2025 Friendly	Walsall	1–1	Solihull Moors	Essington
12:00 BST	Lakin 87'	Report		Stadium: Essington Training Ground; Attendance: 0 (Behind-closed-doors)

22 July 2025 Friendly	Walsall	2–3	Derby County	Walsall
19:30 BST	Harper 10'; Stuttle 43'	Report	Jackson 39'; Blackett-Taylor 62' (pen.); Adbawodikeizu 77'	Stadium: Bescot Stadium; Attendance: 2,789 (1,321 away)

26 July 2025 Friendly	Forest Green Rovers	0–3	Walsall	Nailsworth
15:00 BST		Report	Stuttle 20'; Pressley 31'; Lakin 81'	Stadium: The New Lawn; Attendance: 992 (195 away)

29 July 2025 Friendly	Walsall	3–2	West Bromwich Albion U21	Essington
14:00 BST	Clarke; Matt; Gordon	Report		Stadium: Essington Training Ground; Attendance: 0 (Behind-closed-doors)

== Competitions ==
=== League Two ===
==== League table ====
Pos	Team	Pld	W	D	L	GF	GA	GD	Pts
11	Crewe Alexandra	46	19	10	17	64	58	+6	67
12	Colchester United	46	18	12	16	62	49	+13	66
13	Walsall	46	18	11	17	56	56	0	65
14	Bristol Rovers	46	19	5	22	56	65	−9	62
15	Fleetwood Town	46	15	16	15	57	58	−1	61

Source: EFL Official Website
Rules for classification: 1) Points; 2) Goal difference; 3) Number of goals scored; 4) Head-to-head results; 5) Wins; 6) Away goals; 7) Penalty points (sec 9.5); 8) 12-point sending off offences

==== Results summary ====
Overall								Home						Away					
Pld	W	D	L	GF	GA	GD	Pts	W	D	L	GF	GA	GD	W	D	L	GF	GA	GD
45	18	11	16	55	53	+2	65	8	5	10	23	30	−7	10	6	6	32	23	+9

Last updated: 25 April 2026.
Source: Soccerway

==== Results by round ====
Round	1	2	3	4	5	6	7	8	9	10	11	12	13	14	15	16	17	18	19	20	21	22	23	24	27	28	29	30	26^{2}	31	33	34	35	25^{1}	36	32^{3}	37	38	39	40	41	42	43	44	45
Ground	H	A	A	H	H	A	H	A	H	A	H	A	H	A	A	H	A	H	A	H	A	H	H	A	A	H	H	A	A	H	A	H	A	H	H	A	A	H	H	A	H	A	H	A	H
Result	W	L	W	L	W	W	W	D	W	W	W	D	L	L	W	L	W	W	W	D	D	W	L	L	W	D	D	D	L	L	D	L	W	L	L	L	W	D	W	D	D	L	L	W	L
Position	4	13	7	11	7	6	3	4	4	1	1	1	1	1	1	2	1	1	1	1	1	1	3	3	3	5	6	7	7	7	9	10	9	11	11	11	10	10	10	11	11	12	12	12	12
Points	3	3	6	6	9	12	15	16	19	22	25	26	26	26	29	29	32	35	38	39	40	43	43	43	46	47	48	49	49	49	50	50	53	53	53	53	56	57	60	61	62	62	62	65	65

Source: EFL
A = Away; H = Home; W = Win; D = Draw; L = Loss; P = Postponed
Notes:
- ^{1} Matchday 25 (vs. Fleetwood Town) was postponed due to a frozen pitch.
- ^{2} Matchday 26 (vs. Bristol Rovers) was postponed due to FA Cup involvements.
- ^{3} Matchday 32 (vs. Salford City) was postponed due opposition in FA Cup involvements.

==== Matches ====
On 26 June, the League Two fixtures were released, with Walsall hosting Swindon Town on the opening day.

Win Draw Loss Fixtures

2 August 2025 1	Walsall	2–1	Swindon Town	Walsall
15:00 BST	Weir 8'; Comley (red card) 21'; Warrington (yellow card) 46'; Pressley (yellow card) 66'; Barrett 90+1'	Report	Smith (yellow card) 52'; Wright 79' (pen.)	Stadium: Bescot Stadium; Attendance: 8,240 (2,169 away); Referee: Oliver Mackey

9 August 2025 2	Gillingham	1–0	Walsall	Gillingham
15:00 BST	Dack 58'; Andrews (yellow card) 76'; Coleman (yellow card) 90+6'	Report	Jellis (yellow card) 55'; Stuttle (yellow card) 56'; Clarke (yellow card) 90+1'	Stadium: Priestfield Stadium; Attendance: 6,498 (372 away); Referee: Ross Martin

16 August 2025 3	Barnet	1–2	Walsall	Edgware
15:00 BST	Ofoborh (yellow card) 31' (yellow-red card) 53'; Shelton (yellow card) 35'; Hawkins 40'; Smith (yellow card) 49'	Report	Barrett 2'; Pressley 22'	Stadium: The Hive Stadium; Attendance: 2,608 (806 away); Referee: Abigail Byrne

19 August 2025 4	Walsall	0–1	Grimsby Town	Walsall
20:00 BST	Cox (yellow card) 75'; Roberts (yellow card) 90+6'	Report	Sweeney (yellow card) 32'; Khouri 68'; McEachran (yellow card) 89'	Stadium: Bescot Stadium; Attendance: 5,619 (729 away); Referee: Matt Corlett
Note: Fixture was originally scheduled for a 19:45 kick-off, but was moved live Sky Sports broadcasting.

23 August 2025 5	Walsall	1–0	Salford City	Walsall
12:30 BST	Burke 32'; Harper (yellow card) 37'; Comley (yellow card) 90+3'	Report	Longelo (yellow card) 90+3'	Stadium: Bescot Stadium; Attendance: 5,490 (159 away); Referee: James Oldham
Note: Fixture was originally scheduled for a 15:00 kick-off, but was moved live Sky Sports broadcasting.

30 August 2025 6	Milton Keynes Dons	0–1	Walsall	Milton Keynes
15:00 BST	Offord (yellow card) 9'; Paterson (yellow card) 46'	Report	Harper (yellow card) 49'; Lakin 52'	Stadium: Stadium MK; Attendance: 7,261 (859 away); Referee: Sam Mulhall

6 September 2025 7	Walsall	1–0	Chesterfield	Walsall
15:00 BST	Warrington (yellow card) 39'; Kanu 43'; Lakin (yellow card) 45' (yellow-red card) 61'; Barrett (yellow card) 61'	Report	Darcy (yellow card) 18'; Naylor (yellow card) 45+1'; Daley-Campbell (yellow card) 72'; Dunkley (yellow card) 90+3'	Stadium: Bescot Stadium; Attendance: 6,695; Referee: Zac Kennard-Kettle

13 September 2025 8	Fleetwood Town	1–1	Walsall	Fleetwood
15:00 BST	Graydon 16'; Bolton (yellow card) 37'	Report	Kanu 25'; Harper (yellow card) 56'	Stadium: Highbury Stadium; Attendance: 3,267 (918 away); Referee: Neil Hair

20 September 2025 9	Walsall	4–2	Tranmere Rovers	Walsall
15:00 BST	Weir 9', 45+5'; Kanu 61'; Adomah 90+1'	Report	Ironside 38', (yellow card) 40'; Blacker 89'	Stadium: Bescot Stadium; Attendance: 6,010 (685 away); Referee: Edward Duckworth

27 September 2025 10	Accrington Stanley	1–3	Walsall	Accrington
15:00 BST	Caton 90+1'	Report	Flint (yellow card) 53', (goal) 62'; Pressley 75'; Adomah 90+3'	Stadium: Crown Ground; Attendance: 2,448 (696 away); Referee: Ross Joyce

4 October 2025 11	Walsall	2–1	Bristol Rovers	Walsall
15:00 BST	Pressley 69', 78'; Clarke (yellow card) 84'; Weir (yellow card) 90+3'; Comley (yellow card) 90+10'	Report	Chang (yellow card) 20'; Cavegn 27'; Harrison (yellow card) 39'; Sparkes (yellow card) 83'	Stadium: Bescot Stadium; Attendance: 8,003 (2,151 away); Referee: Stephen Martin

11 October 2025 12	Crawley Town	1–1	Walsall	Crawley
15:00 BST	Loft 32'; Anderson (yellow card) 45'; Malone (yellow card) 90+5'	Report	Clarke (yellow card) 37'; Barrett 53'; Finnigan (yellow card) 79'	Stadium: Broadfield Stadium; Attendance: 3,461 (505 away); Referee: Alan Young

18 October 2025 13	Walsall	1–2	Barrow	Walsall
15:00 BST	Clarke (yellow card) 70'; Kanu 74'	Report	Shipley (yellow card) 23' (yellow-red card) 56'; Newby 31'; Mahoney (yellow card) 39'; McCann 68'; Harper (yellow card) 90+2'	Stadium: Bescot Stadium; Attendance: 7,763 (247 away); Referee: Benjamin Speedie

25 October 2025 14	Cheltenham Town	1–0	Walsall	Cheltenham
12:30 BST	Tomkinson (yellow card) 36'; Young (yellow card) 45+4'; Flint 90+2' (o.g.)	Report	Okeke (yellow card) 49'	Stadium: Whaddon Road; Attendance: 4,569 (1,052 away); Referee: Oliver Yates
Note: Fixture was originally scheduled for a 15:00 kick-off, but was rescheduled for live Sky Sports broadcasting.

8 November 2025 15	Newport County	2–4	Walsall	Newport
15:00 GMT	Whitmore 16', (yellow card) 65'; Garner 44'; Ogunneye (yellow card) 48'; Braybrooke (yellow card) 57'; Lloyd (yellow card) 61'	Report	Kanu 17'; Finnigan 19', 37'; Flint (yellow card) 50'; Browne 52'; Barrett (yellow card) 61'	Stadium: Rodney Parade; Attendance: 4,300 (645 away); Referee: Ben Atkinson

15 November 2025 16	Walsall	0–2	Colchester United	Walsall
15:00 GMT	Barrett (yellow card) 58'; Weir (yellow card) 61'	Report	Bishop (yellow card) 19'; Tovide 21'; Iandolo (yellow card) 24'; Lisbie 42'; Macey (yellow card) 83'; Flanagan (yellow card) 90+2'	Stadium: Bescot Stadium; Attendance: 6,251 (318 away); Referee: James Durkin

22 November 2025 17	Harrogate Town	0–2	Walsall	Harrogate
12:30 GMT	Morris (yellow card) 21'	Report	Kanu 43'; Warrington (yellow card) 58'; Adomah (yellow card) 79'; Farquharson 87'	Stadium: Wetherby Road; Attendance: 3,249 (602 away); Referee: Aaron Banister
Note: Fixture was originally scheduled for a 15:00 kick-off, but was rescheduled for live Sky Sports broadcasting.

29 November 2025 18	Walsall	3–1	Bromley	Walsall
15:00 GMT	Matt (yellow card) 64'; Kanu 64'; Finnigan 80'; Clarke 90+10'	Report	Charles (yellow card) 12'; Krauhaus 18'; Ifill (yellow card) 63'; Sowunmi (yellow card) 64'	Stadium: Bescot Stadium; Attendance: 7,228; Referee: Michael Barlow

10 December 2025 19	Oldham Athletic	0–1	Walsall	Oldham
19:45 GMT	Pett (yellow card) 36'; Fondop (yellow card) 77'; Robson (yellow card) 90+5'	Report	Warrington (yellow card) 22'; Kanu 27'; Cox (yellow card) 45'	Stadium: Boundary Park; Attendance: 6,523 (538 away); Referee: Stephen Parkinson
Note: Fixture was initially scheduled for 9 December, but was rescheduled due to FA Cup involvements on the preceding Sunday.

13 December 2025 20	Walsall	1–1	Shrewsbury Town	Walsall
15:00 GMT	Kanu 3'; Jellis (yellow card) 86'	Report	Perry (yellow card) 35'; Kabia (yellow card) 58'; Anderson 65', (yellow card) 90+4'; McDermott (yellow card) 85'	Stadium: Bescot Stadium; Attendance: 7,342 (1,199 away); Referee: Isaac Searle

20 December 2025 21	Notts County	0–0	Walsall	Nottingham
12:30 GMT	Grant (yellow card) 70'	Report	Finnigan (yellow card) 16'; Barrett (yellow card) 76'	Stadium: Meadow Lane; Attendance: 11,870 (1,496 away); Referee: Steven Copeland
Note: Fixture was originally scheduled for a 15:00 kick-off, but was rescheduled for live Sky Sports broadcasting.

26 December 2025 22	Walsall	1–0	Crewe Alexandra	Walsall
15:00 GMT	Matt 45+2'; Harper (yellow card) 90+3'	Report	Billington (yellow card) 63'; Holíček (yellow card) 73'	Stadium: Bescot Stadium; Attendance: 7,609 (1,008 away); Referee: Simon Mather

29 December 2025 23	Walsall	1–2	Oldham Athletic	Walsall
19:45 GMT	Flint (yellow card) 38'; Kanu 50'; Clarke (yellow card) 87'	Report	Garner 15', (yellow card) 45+2'; Payne (yellow card) 56'; Harratt 90+6'	Stadium: Bescot Stadium; Attendance: 6,704 (836 away); Referee: Oliver Mackey

1 January 2026 24	Cambridge United	2–0	Walsall	Cambridge
15:00 GMT	Knight 45+2', 53'	Report	Pressley (penalty missed) 90'; Browne (yellow card) 90+2'	Stadium: Abbey Stadium; Attendance: 7,277 (825 away); Referee: Wayne Cartmel

17 January 2026 27	Tranmere Rovers	1–3	Walsall	Birkenhead
12:30 GMT	Finley (yellow card) 81'; Ironside 90'	Report	Farquharson 38'; Barrett (yellow card) 43'; Kanu 45'; Matt 65'; Łopata (yellow card) 90+2'	Stadium: Prenton Park; Attendance: 5,751 (504 away); Referee: Darren Drysdale
Note: Fixture was originally scheduled for a 15:00 kick-off, but was rescheduled for live Sky Sports broadcasting.

24 January 2026 28	Walsall	0–0	Accrington Stanley	Walsall
15:00 GMT	Barrett (yellow card) 8'; Comley (yellow card) 24'; Flint (yellow card) 42'; Farquharson (yellow card) 67'; Loupalo-Bi (yellow card) 89'	Report	Heath (yellow card) 30'; Love (yellow card) 69'; Sinclair (yellow card) 74'	Stadium: Bescot Stadium; Attendance: 5,682 (163 away); Referee: Elliott Swallow

27 January 2026 29	Walsall	0–0	Crawley Town	Walsall
19:45 GMT	Matt (yellow card) 43'; Hancock (yellow card) 61'; Clarke (yellow card) 90'	Report	Barker (yellow card) 6'; Anderson (yellow card) 32'; Flint (yellow card) 54'; Gordon (yellow card) 63'; Odimayo (yellow card) 87'	Stadium: Bescot Stadium; Attendance: 4,899 (141 away); Referee: Scott Oldham

31 January 2026 30	Chesterfield	2–2	Walsall	Chesterfield
15:00 GMT	Grigg 12'; Markandy 20'	Report	Kanu 41'; Adomah 60'	Stadium: SMH Group Stadium; Attendance: 8,702 (976 away); Referee: Charles Breakspear

3 February 2026 26	Bristol Rovers	2–0	Walsall	Bristol
19:45 GMT	Sparkes (yellow card) 43'; Akhamrich 61'; Balmer 64'	Report	Pattison (yellow card) 59'	Stadium: Memorial Stadium; Attendance: 6,291 (331 away); Referee: Alex Chilowicz
Note: Fixture was initially scheduled for 10 January, but was postponed due to FA Cup involvements.

7 February 2026 31	Walsall	1–3	Barnet	Walsall
15:00 GMT	Pressley (yellow card) 2'; Hancock (yellow card) 62'; Kanu 64'; Comley (yellow card) 71'; Clarke (yellow card) 71'; Farquharson (yellow card) 87'	Report	Senior 41'; Kanu 54'; Smith (yellow card) 62'; Tshimanga 68'	Stadium: Bescot Stadium; Attendance: 5,179 (288 away); Referee: Paul Marsden

18 February 2026 33	Grimsby Town	2–2	Walsall	Cleethorpes
19:45 GMT	Cook 50', 68', (yellow card) 66'	Report	Łopata (yellow card) 7'; Farquharson 32'; Roberts (red card) 45+1'; Pressley 71'; Hornby (yellow card) 86'	Stadium: Blundell Park; Attendance: 5,138 (187 away); Referee: Thomas Parsons
Note: Fixture was initially scheduled for 17 February, but was rearranged due to Grimsby's FA Cup participation on the preceding Sunday.

23 February 2026 34	Walsall	0–2	Milton Keynes Dons	Walsall
20:00 GMT	Pattison (yellow card) 26'; Flint (yellow card) 45'	Report	Hepburn-Murphy 30'; Crowley (yellow card) 44'; Mellish (yellow card) 58', (goal) 84'; Ekpiteta (yellow card) 69'	Stadium: Bescot Stadium; Attendance: 5,131 (485 away); Referee: Peter Wright
Note: Fixture was originally scheduled for 21 February, but was rescheduled for live Sky Sports broadcasting.

28 February 2026 35	Shrewsbury Town	1–2	Walsall	Shrewsbury
12:30 GMT	Morgan 45+6'; Boyle (yellow card) 61'; Ruffels (red card) 90+2'	Report	Farquharson 28', 62'; Hornby (yellow card) 85'	Stadium: New Meadow; Attendance: 7,879 (1,640 away); Referee: Richard Eley
Note: Fixture was originally scheduled for a 15:00 kick-off, but was rescheduled for live Sky Sports broadcasting.

3 March 2026 25	Walsall	0–1	Fleetwood Town	Walsall
19:45 GMT		Report	Helm 15'; Rooney (yellow card) 41'	Stadium: Bescot Stadium; Attendance: 4,795 (116 away); Referee: Steven Copeland
Note: Fixture was originally scheduled for 4 January, but it was postponed due to a frozen pitch.

7 March 2026 36	Walsall	1–2	Notts County	Walsall
15:00 GMT	Jellis (yellow card) 22'; Comley (yellow card) 36'; Pressley 45+1'; Burke (yellow card) 90+6'	Report	Jones (yellow card) 49', (goal) 90+4'; Dennis (yellow card) 51'; Grant (yellow card) 55'; Norburn 79'; Bennetts (yellow card) 90'	Stadium: Bescot Stadium; Attendance: 7,316 (1,903 away); Referee: Scott Jackson

10 March 2026 32	Salford City	1–0	Walsall	Kersal
19:45 GMT	Mnoga (yellow card) 56'; Borini 74'	Report	Flint (yellow card) 38'	Stadium: Moor Lane; Attendance: 2,011 (246 away); Referee: Martin Woods
Note: Fixture was initially scheduled for a 15:00 kick-off on 14 February, but was rescheduled for live Sky Sports broadcasting. Then it was rearranged again due to Salford's participation in the FA Cup.

14 March 2026 37	Crewe Alexandra	0–3	Walsall	Crewe
15:00 GMT	Pond (yellow card) 19'; Lawlor (yellow card) 30'	Report	Adomah 5', 90+1'; Farqharson (yellow card) 12'; Kanu (penalty missed) 31'; Browne (yellow card) 55'; Pressley 83'; Comley (yellow card) 90+5'	Stadium: Gresty Road; Attendance: 5,885; Referee: Stephen Parkinson

17 March 2026 38	Walsall	0–0	Cambridge United	Walsall
19:45 GMT		Report	Kaikai (yellow card) 24'; Ball (yellow card) 59'	Stadium: Bescot Stadium; Attendance: 5,311; Referee: Simon Mather

21 March 2026 39	Walsall	2–1	Newport County	Walsall
15:00 GMT	Chang (yellow card) 30'; Hancock (yellow card) 58'; Kanu 62'; Lakin (yellow card) 76'; Pattison 90+7', (yellow card) 90+8'	Report	Sprangler (yellow card) 2'; Biggins 38'; Evans (yellow card) 58'; Lloyd (yellow card) 58'	Stadium: Bescot Stadium; Attendance: Ross Joyce; Referee: 6,652 (717 away)

28 March 2026 40	Colchester United	1–1	Walsall	Colchester
15:00 GMT	Read (yellow card) 63'; Anderson 68'; Iandolo (yellow card) 89'	Report	Burke 64'	Stadium: Colchester Community Stadium; Attendance: 4,904 (346 away); Referee: Carl Brook

3 April 2026 41	Walsall	2–2	Gillingham	Walsall
15:00 BST	Loupalo-Bi 21'; Kanu 66'	Report	Hale 50'; Dack (yellow card) 52'; Palmer-Houlden 63'; Gale (yellow card) 90+4'	Stadium: Bescot Stadium; Attendance: 5,994; Referee: William Davis

6 April 2026 42	Swindon Town	2–1	Walsall	Swindon
15:00 BST	Clarke (yellow card) 80'; Holman 81'; Drinan 90+2'	Report	Jellis 66'; Flint (yellow card) 88'	Stadium: County Ground; Attendance: 8,981 (894 away); Referee: Elliott Swallow

11 April 2026 43	Walsall	0–4	Cheltenham Town	Walsall
15:00 BST	Comley (yellow card) 57'	Report	Ashfield (yellow card) 35', (goal) 56'; Hutchinson 63'; Miller 69'; Martin 90+3'	Stadium: Bescot Stadium; Attendance: 6,103 (611 away); Referee: Alan Dale

18 April 2026 44	Barrow	1–3	Walsall	Barrow-in-Furness
12:30 BST	Anderson (yellow card) 67'; Malcolm 88'	Report	Adomah 33'; Hancock 45+2', 68'	Stadium: Holker Street; Attendance: 3,831 (263 away); Referee: Scott Oldham
Note: Fixture was initially scheduled for a 15:00 kick-off, but was brought forward for Sky Sports broadcasting.

25 April 2026 45	Walsall	0–2	Harrogate Town	Bescot
15:00 BST	Flint (yellow card) 43'; Farquharson (yellow card) 76'; Comley (yellow card) 84'	Report	Hill (yellow card) 15'; Faulkner (yellow card) 22'; McCoulsky 45', 54'	Stadium: Bescot Stadium; Attendance: 6,181 (284 away); Referee: Benjamin Speedie

=== FA Cup ===
Walsall were drawn away to Eastleigh in the first round, Gateshead in the second round and Norwich City in the third round.

Win Draw Loss Fixtures

2 November 2025 First round	Eastleigh	0–3	Walsall	Eastleigh
14:15 GMT	Pierre (yellow card) 45'	Report	Weir 6'; Pressley (yellow card) 18'; Kanu 50'; Matt 79'	Stadium: Ten Acres; Attendance: 2,389; Referee: Lee Swabey

7 December 2025 Second round	Gateshead	0–2	Walsall	Gateshead
15:30 GMT	Ferguson (yellow card) 45+1'	Report	Kanu 25' (pen.); Flint 49'; Clarke (yellow card) 69'; Comley (yellow card) 71'; Weir (yellow card) 84'	Stadium: Gateshead International Stadium; Attendance: 1,608; Referee: James Oldham

11 January 2026 Third round	Norwich City	5–1	Walsall	Norwich
14:30 GMT	Jurásek 15'; Makama 24', 48', 55'; Springett 90+2'	Report	Clarke 67'	Stadium: Carrow Road; Attendance: 19,776 (1,024 away); Referee: Edward Duckworth

=== EFL Cup ===
Walsall were drawn away to Stoke City in the first round.

Win Draw Loss Fixtures

12 August 2025 First round	Stoke City	0–0 (4–3 p)	Walsall	Stoke-on-Trent
19:45 BST	Seko (yellow card) 50'; Lawal (yellow card) 55'	Report	Farquharson (yellow card) 57'	Stadium: bet365 Stadium; Attendance: 8,809 (1,325 away); Referee: James Bell
	Penalties
	Baker (penalty scored); Donley (penalty scored); Mubama (penalty missed); Bae Jun-ho (penalty scored); Bonham (penalty scored)		(penalty scored) Matt; (penalty missed) Stuttle; (penalty scored) Flint; (penalty scored) Jellis; (penalty missed) Adomah

=== EFL Trophy ===
Walsall were drawn against Northampton Town, Shrewsbury Town and Chelsea U21 in the group stage. After finishing second in the group stage, they were drawn away to Stevenage in the round of 32. and to Northampton Town in the round of 16.

Pos	Div	Team	Pld	W	PW	PL	L	GF	GA	GD	Pts	Qualification
1	L1	Northampton Town	3	3	0	0	0	6	1	+5	9	Advance to Round 2
2	L2	Walsall	3	1	1	0	1	3	2	+1	5	Advance to Round 2
3	L2	Shrewsbury Town	3	1	0	0	2	5	6	−1	3	
4	ACA	Chelsea U21	3	0	0	1	2	1	6	−5	1	

Source: EFL

Win Draw Loss Fixtures

2 September 2025 South Group C	Shrewsbury Town	1–3	Walsall	Shrewsbury
19:00 BST	Ihionvien 10'; Boyle (yellow card) 75'; Gray (yellow card) 90+1'	Report	Finnigan 5' , (yellow card) 27'; Comley (yellow card) 31'; Maher (yellow card) 67'; Adomah 67'; Okeke 80'	Stadium: New Meadow; Attendance: 2,004 (551 away); Referee: Declan Bourne (England)

7 October 2025 South Group C	Walsall	0–1	Northampton Town	Bescot
19:00 BST	Hornby (yellow card) 78'; Maher (yellow card) 82'	Report	McCarthy (yellow card) 53'; Swyer 88'	Stadium: Bescot Stadium; Attendance: 1,907 (214 away); Referee: Richard Eley (England)

28 October 2025 South Group C	Walsall	0–0 (4–2 p)	Chelsea U21	Bescot
19:00 GMT	Harper (yellow card) 45'	Report	Runham (yellow card) 20'; Osagie (yellow card) 63'; Wilson (yellow card) 90+7'	Stadium: Bescot Stadium; Attendance: 1,068 (47 away); Referee: Elliott Swallow
	Penalties
	Adomah (penalty missed); Clarke (penalty scored); Straw (penalty scored); Jellis (penalty scored); Okeke (penalty scored)		Best (penalty scored); Walsh (penalty missed); Pennie (penalty missed); Sambou (penalty scored)

2 December 2025 Round of 32	Stevenage	1–2	Walsall	Stevenage
19:00 GMT	Piergianni 57'; Freestone (yellow card) 76'	Report	Richards 63', 72'	Stadium: Broadhall Way; Referee: Alex Chilowicz

14 January 2026 Round of 16	Northampton Town	4–2	Walsall	Northampton
19:00 GMT	Swyer 18', 48'; Hoskins 62'; Jacobs (yellow card) 79'; Eaves 90+2' (pen.)	Report	Adomah 5'; Hancock (yellow card) 24'; Hollman (yellow card) 55'; Kanu 75'	Stadium: Sixfields Stadium; Attendance: 1,406 (217 away); Referee: Abigail Byrne

== Statistics ==
=== Appearances and goals ===
As of match played 25 April 2026

Players with no appearances are not included on the list; italics indicate loaned in player

No.	Pos	Nat	Player	Total		League Two		FA Cup		EFL Cup		EFL Trophy	
No.	Pos	Nat	Player	Apps	Goals	Apps	Goals	Apps	Goals	Apps	Goals	Apps	Goals
1	GK	(England) ENG	Myles Roberts	46	0	43+0	0	3+0	0	0+0	0	0+0	0
2	DF	(England) ENG	Connor Barrett	38	3	29+4	3	3+0	0	1+0	0	1+0	0
3	DF	(England) ENG	Mason Hancock	19	2	17+1	2	0+0	0	0+0	0	1+0	0
4	DF	(England) ENG	Aden Flint	48	2	42+2	1	3+0	1	0+1	0	0+0	0
5	DF	(England) ENG	Harrison Burke	24	2	19+3	2	0+0	0	1+0	0	1+0	0
6	DF	(England) ENG	Priestley Farquharson	35	5	19+9	5	2+0	0	1+0	0	3+1	0
7	FW	(Jamaica) JAM	Kemar Roofe	4	0	0+2	0	0+1	0	0+0	0	1+0	0
8	MF	(England) ENG	Charlie Lakin	48	1	34+10	1	2+1	0	0+0	0	1+0	0
9	FW	(Jamaica) JAM	Jamille Matt	34	3	12+14	2	1+2	1	0+1	0	4+0	0
10	FW	(England) ENG	Josh Gordon	2	0	0+1	0	0+0	0	1+0	0	0+0	0
11	FW	(England) ENG	Aaron Loupalo-Bi	16	1	6+10	1	0+0	0	0+0	0	0+0	0
12	GK	(England) ENG	Sam Hornby	10	0	3+1	0	0+0	0	1+0	0	5+0	0
14	MF	(Montserrat) MSR	Brandon Comley	45	0	22+16	0	3+0	0	1+0	0	3+0	0
15	FW	(Sierra Leone) SLE	Daniel Kanu	44	18	38+2	15	3+0	2	0+0	0	0+1	1
16	MF	(Republic of Ireland) IRL	Ronan Maher	4	0	0+0	0	0+0	0	1+0	0	1+2	0
17	MF	(Jamaica) JAM	Courtney Clarke	50	2	15+26	1	2+1	1	1+0	0	4+1	0
18	MF	(Kenya) KEN	Vincent Harper	37	0	23+7	0	2+1	0	1+0	0	2+1	0
19	FW	(Scotland) SCO	Aaron Pressley	41	7	26+13	7	2+0	0	0+0	0	0+0	0
20	MF	(England) ENG	Alfie Chang	6	0	5+1	0	0+0	0	0+0	0	0+0	0
22	MF	(England) ENG	Jamie Jellis	43	1	25+10	1	1+2	0	0+1	0	1+3	0
23	MF	(England) ENG	Alex Pattison	19	1	13+4	1	0+1	0	0+0	0	1+0	0
25	DF	(Germany) GER	Jid Okeke	30	1	14+11	0	1+0	0	0+0	0	2+2	1
30	DF	(Republic of Ireland) IRL	Evan Weir	34	4	30+0	3	3+0	1	0+0	0	1+0	0
31	MF	(England) ENG	Rico Richards	14	2	1+9	0	0+0	0	0+0	0	4+0	2
32	MF	(Australia) AUS	Jake Hollman	8	0	0+3	0	0+0	0	0+1	0	1+3	0
33	DF	(Saint Kitts and Nevis) SKN	Rico Browne	28	1	17+4	1	1+1	0	0+0	0	5+0	0
34	FW	(England) ENG	Charlie Wragg	1	0	0+0	0	0+0	0	0+0	0	0+1	0
35	DF	(Poland) POL	Kacper Łopata	9	0	6+3	0	0+0	0	0+0	0	0+0	0
37	FW	(Ghana) GHA	Albert Adomah	51	8	11+31	6	0+3	0	1+0	0	5+0	2
55	DF	(England) ENG	Paul Makavore	1	0	0+0	0	0+0	0	0+0	0	0+1	0
56	MF	(England) ENG	McLloyd Oben	3	0	0+0	0	0+0	0	0+0	0	0+3	0
59	DF	(England) ENG	Stan Straw	5	0	0+0	0	0+0	0	0+0	0	2+3	0
Players who featured but departed the club during the season:
7	FW	(England) ENG	Jonny Stuttle	5	0	4+0	0	0+0	0	0+1	0	0+0	0
20	DF	(Wales) WAL	Daniel Cox	7	0	3+0	0	0+0	0	1+0	0	3+0	0
28	MF	(England) ENG	Lewis Warrington	20	0	15+3	0	0+0	0	0+0	0	1+1	0
29	MF	(England) ENG	Ryan Finnigan	26	4	14+7	3	1+1	0	0+0	0	3+0	1
