= Alex Parsons =

Alex Parsons may refer to:

- Alex Parsons (American football) (born 1987), American football offensive guard
- Alex Parsons (footballer, born 1992), English footballer
- Alex Parsons (soccer, born 2000), Australian soccer player
