= Ángel Díaz (footballer) =

Chilean footballer

Personal information
- Full name: Ángel Francisco Díaz Villa
- Date of birth: 18 February 2007 (age 19)
- Position: Midfielder

Team information
- Current team: Wimborne Town

Youth career
- –2025: Colo-Colo

Senior career*
Years	Team	Apps	(Gls)
2026–	Wimborne Town	7	(4)
- * Club domestic league appearances and goals as of 22 November 2026

Ángel Francisco Díaz Villa (born 18 February 2007) is a Chilean footballer who plays as a midfielder for English club Wimborne Town.

== Club career ==
=== Early career ===
Díaz began his career in the academy of Colo-Colo in his native Chile, first attracting international attention at the 2023 Flamengo Adidas Cup in Brazil. He began attracting the attention a number of Brazilian clubs, and after falling out with Colo-Colo hierarchy in January 2025 over unfulfilled promises regarding his progression into the first team set up, a handful of clubs, including Flamengo offered him a contract. After being told that he would not be receiving a professional contract with the club, Díaz left Colo-Colo in June 2025.

=== Wimborne Town ===
Having made the decision to move to England, Díaz signed with Wimborne Town of the Southern Football League - England's seventh tier. He suffered an injury that kept him side-lined for a number of weeks shortly after his arrival. In just his second game for the club, he scored Wimborne's 108th minute equaliser against National League South opposition Weston-super-Mare in the FA Cup on 22 September 2026; the goal took the game to penalties, which Wimborne won 4–3.

On 10 October 2026, Díaz scored four goals as Wimborne Town beat Havant & Waterlooville 6–3 in the Southern League Premier South division. He scored again a week later; the only goal in Wimborne's 1–0 win against another National League South team in the FA Cup, Chelmsford City.

== International career ==
Díaz has been called up to Chile training camps at under-15, under-16 and under-18 level, as well as attending training camps for the full national team as a sparring partner.

== Career statistics ==
=== Club ===
As of 22 November 2026.

Appearances and goals by club, season and competition
Club	Season	League			Cup (Note: Includes FA Cup)		Other		Total	
Club	Season	Division	Apps	Goals	Apps	Goals	Apps	Goals	Apps	Goals
Wimborne Town	2026–27	Southern League Premier South	7	4	5	2	1 (Note: Appearances in the FA Trophy)	0	13	6
Career total			7	4	5	2	1	0	13	6
