= Dan Cox (footballer) =

Welsh footballer (born 2006)

Personal information
- Full name: Daniel James Cox
- Date of birth: 30 January 2006 (age 20)
- Position: Defender

Team information
- Current team: Southend United
- Number: 20

Youth career
- 2013–2015: Belvedere Park
- 2015–2024: Derby County

Senior career*
Years	Team	Apps	(Gls)
2024–2026	Derby County	0	(0)
2024–2025	→ Enfield Town (loan)	9	(0)
2025–2026	→ Walsall (loan)	3	(0)
2026	→ Wealdstone (loan)	0	(0)
2026	→ Solihull Moors (loan)	5	(0)
2026–	Southend United	6	(0)

International career^{‡}
- Wales U19
2025–	Wales U21	5	(0)
- * Club domestic league appearances and goals as of 24 September 2026 (UTC) ‡ National team caps and goals as of 00:50, 29 September 2026 (UTC)

Daniel James Cox (born 30 January 2006) is a Welsh professional footballer who plays as a defender for National League club Southend United. He is a Wales Under-21 international.

Cox began his career with Derby County, and has had loan spells at Enfield Town, Walsall, Wealdstone and Solihull Moors. He was released by Derby County in June 2026 and signed with Southend United.

== Club career ==
=== Derby County ===
Cox began his career at Belvedere Park at the age of 7, where he spent 2 years before joining Derby County. He made his senior Derby County debut on 8 November 2023 in the EFL Trophy 4–1 win against Wolverhampton Wanderers under-21s. Cox signed on loan for Enfield Town in October 2024. Cox made nine National League North appearances during his two months he spent on loan at Enfield.

In July 2025 Cox moved on loan to EFL League Two club Walsall for the 2025–26 season. Cox made his Walsall debut on 12 August 2025 in the starting line-up for the 1st round EFL Cup penalty shootout defeat at Stoke City. He made his league debut on 16 August 2025 in the starting line-up for the 2–1 EFL League Two defeat to Barnet.

In January 2026 he was recalled by Derby, after making seven appearances. moving on loan to Wealdstone later that month, for an initial month-long loan. On 10 January 2026. Cox made his debut for Wealdstone in a 1–0 fourth round FA Trophy win at Dagenham & Redbridge. This would turn out to be the only appearance for Cox as his loan was ended early on 21 January, after picking up a hamstring injury.

On 25 March 2026 upon his recovery from injury, Cox joined National League club Solihull Moors on loan until the end of the 2025–26 season. Cox made his debut for Solihull Moors in the starting line-up for the 1–0 National League victory over Altrincham on 28 March 2026. Cox played five times for Moors.

On 15 May 2026, it was announced that Cox would leave Derby County upon the expiry of his contract in June 2026.

=== Southend United ===
On 27 June 2026, Cox joined National League club Southend United on a two-year contract, with an option for a third year.

== International career ==
Cox is a former Wales under-19 international. He made his debut for the Wales under-21 national team on 8 September 2025, in a 2027 UEFA European Under-21 Championship qualification match against Denmark.

== Style of play ==
Cox "leads by example".

== Career statistics ==
As of match played 25 April 2026

Appearances and goals by club, season and competition
Club	Season	League			FA Cup		EFL Cup		Other		Total	
Club	Season	Division	Apps	Goals	Apps	Goals	Apps	Goals	Apps	Goals	Apps	Goals
Derby County	2023–24	League One	0	0	0	0	0	0	1 (Note: Appearances in the EFL Trophy)	0	1	0
Derby County	2024–25	Championship	0	0	0	0	0	0	—		0	0
Derby County	2025–26	Championship	0	0	0	0	0	0	—		0	0
Derby County	Total		0	0	0	0	0	0	0	0	1	0
Enfield Town (loan)	2024–25	National League North	9	0	—		—		1 (Note: Appearances in the FA Trophy)	0	10	0
Walsall (loan)	2025–26	League Two	3	0	0	0	1	0	3	0	7	0
Wealdstone (loan)	2025–26	National League	0	0	—		—		1	0	1	0
Solihull Moors (loan)	2025–26	National League	5	0	—		—		—		5	0
Southend United	2026–27	National League	0	0	0	0	—		0	0	0	0
Career total			17	0	0	0	1	0	6	0	24	0
