= Evan Weir =

Irish footballer (born 2002)

Personal information
- Full name: Evan Robert Weir
- Date of birth: 16 April 2002 (age 24)
- Place of birth: Ratoath, Ireland
- Height: 1.85 m (6 ft 1 in)
- Position: Defender

Team information
- Current team: Peterborough United
- Number: 3

Youth career
- 2018–2019: UCD

Senior career*
Years	Team	Apps	(Gls)
2020–2021	UCD	37	(4)
2021	Maynooth University Town		
2022–2023	Drogheda United	51	(5)
2024–2026	Walsall	44	(3)
2024	→ Drogheda United (loan)	19	(4)
2026–	Peterborough United	3	(0)
- * Club domestic league appearances and goals as of 21:37, 17 November 2026 (UTC)

Evan Robert Weir (born 16 April 2002) is an Irish professional footballer who plays as a defender for EFL League One side Peterborough United.

== Club career ==
Born in Ratoath, Weir spent his early career with UCD and Maynooth University Town, before signing for Drogheda United for the 2022 season. He combined his playing career with his job as an electrician.

He signed for English club Walsall with effect from January 2024, returning on loan to Drogheda.

He was released by Walsall at the end of the 2025–26 season.

On 11 June 2026, Weir agreed to join League One club Peterborough United on an initial three-year deal with the option for a further season.

== International career ==
Weir spent time at Ireland under-21 training camps, before receiving a call-up to the squad in October 2023.

== Career statistics ==
As of match played 17 November 2026

Appearances and goals by club, season and competition
Club	Season	League			National cup		League cup		Other		Total	
Club	Season	Division	Apps	Goals	Apps	Goals	Apps	Goals	Apps	Goals	Apps	Goals
UCD	2020	League of Ireland First Division	16	4	1	0	0	0	0	0	17	4
UCD	2021	League of Ireland First Division	21	0	2	0	0	0	0	0	23	0
UCD	Total		37	4	3	0	0	0	0	0	40	4
Drogheda United	2022	League of Ireland Premier Division	27	4	1	0	0	0	0	0	28	4
Drogheda United	2023	League of Ireland Premier Division	24	1	1	0	0	0	0	0	25	1
Drogheda United	Total		51	5	2	0	0	0	0	0	53	5
Walsall	2023–24	EFL League Two	0	0	0	0	0	0	0	0	0	0
Walsall	2024–25	EFL League Two	14	0	0	0	3	0	5 (Note: Appearance(s) in the EFL Trophy)	0	22	0
Walsall	2025–26	EFL League Two	30	3	3	1	0	0	1	0	34	4
Walsall	Total		44	3	3	1	3	0	6	0	56	4
Drogheda United (loan)	2024	League of Ireland Premier Division	19	4	0	0	0	0	0	0	19	4
Peterborough United	2026–27	EFL League One	3	0	0	0	1	0	3	0	7	0
Career total			154	16	8	1	4	0	9	0	175	17
