= Harrison Burke =

English footballer

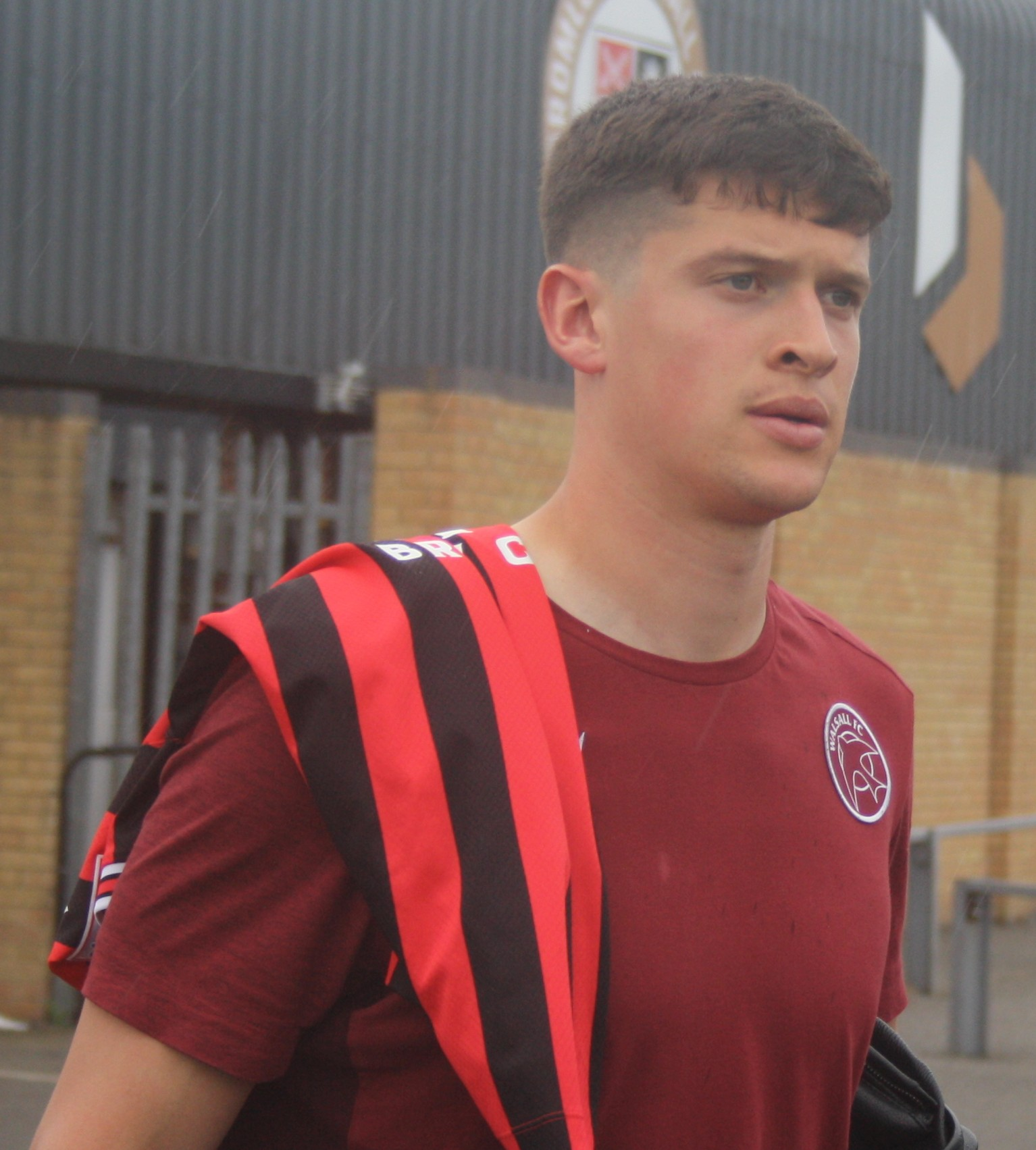
- Burke in 2026

Personal information
- Full name: Harrison John Burke
- Date of birth: 13 September 2002 (age 24)
- Height: 1.80 m (5 ft 11 in)
- Position: Defender

Team information
- Current team: Walsall
- Number: 5

Youth career
- 2015–2021: Chester

Senior career*
Years	Team	Apps	(Gls)
2021–2025	Chester	130	(19)
2021	→ Clitheroe (loan)	15	(4)
2025–	Walsall	27	(3)
- * Club domestic league appearances and goals as of 14:39, 22 November 2026 (UTC)

Harrison John Burke (born 13 September 2002) is an English professional footballer who plays as a defender for Walsall.

== Career ==
From Dodleston, Burke began his career with Chester at under-13 level, before signing a first-team contract aged 18 in October 2020. He had a loan spell at Clitheroe in 2021, before returning to Chester and becoming a first-team regular. He was Chester's Player of the Year in 2024–25, and that same season was part of the National League North Team Of The Season.

He signed for Walsall in June 2025 for an undisclosed fee on a three-year contract. He was injured at the start of the season, and scored his first goal for the club in a 1–0 victory on 23 August 2025 against Salford City. On 29 August 2026, he was appointed Walsall captain for the first time in a 3–2 home victory against Accrington Stanley in which he scored.

== Career statistics ==
As of match played 21 November 2026

Appearances and goals by club, season and competition
Club	Season	League			National Cup		League Cup		Other		Total	
Club	Season	Division	Apps	Goals	Apps	Goals	Apps	Goals	Apps	Goals	Apps	Goals
Chester	2019–20	National League North	0	0	0	0	—		1 (Note: Appearance(s) in Cheshire Senior Cup)	0	1	0
Chester	2020–21	National League North	0	0	0	0	—		1 (Note: Appearance(s) in FA Trophy)	0	1	0
Chester	2021–22	National League North	19	2	0	0	—		1	0	20	2
Chester	2022–23	National League North	24	2	5	1	—		2 (Note: One appearance in Cheshire Senior Cup, one appearance in National League North play-offs)	0	31	3
Chester	2023–24	National League North	42	4	5	2	—		1	0	48	6
Chester	2024–25	National League North	45	11	4	1	—		4 (Note: One appearance in FA Trophy, three appearances and one goal in National League North play-offs)	1	53	13
Chester	Total		130	19	14	4	0	0	10	1	154	24
Clitheroe (loan)	2021–22	NPL Division One West	15	4	2	0	—		1	0	18	4
Walsall	2025–26	League Two	22	2	0	0	1	0	1 (Note: Appearance in the EFL Trophy)	0	24	2
Walsall	2026–27	League Two	5	1	0	0	2	0	3	0	10	1
Walsall	Total		27	3	0	0	3	0	4	0	34	3
Career total			172	26	16	4	3	0	15	1	206	31
