= Daniel Kanu (footballer) =

Sierra Leonean footballer (born 2004)

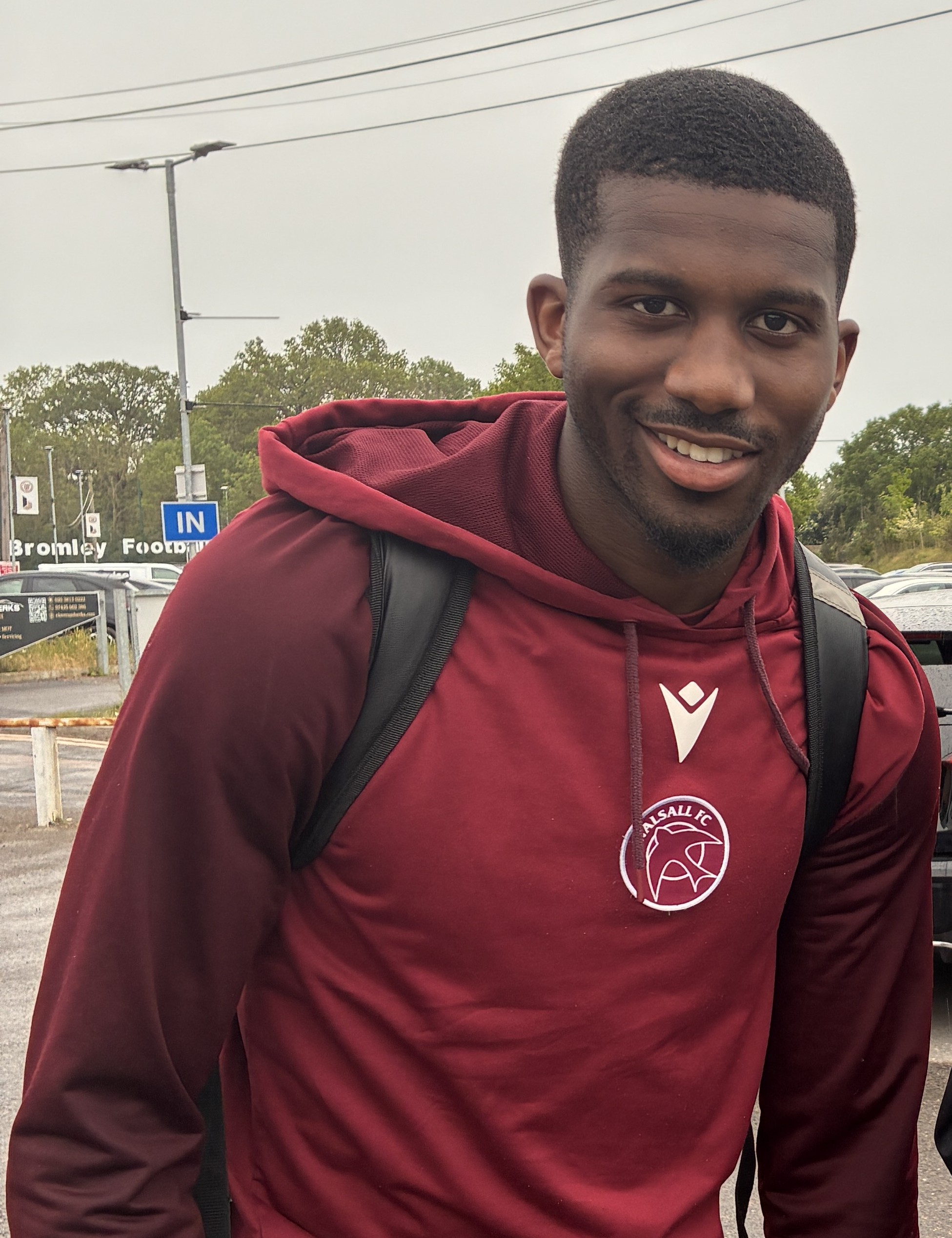
- Daniel Kanu in 2026

Personal information
- Full name: Daniel Malanga Kanu
- Date of birth: 14 November 2004 (age 22)
- Place of birth: Lambeth, England
- Height: 1.79 m (5 ft 10 in)
- Position: Forward

Team information
- Current team: Notts County (on loan from Charlton Athletic)
- Number: 9

Youth career
- 2014–2022: Charlton Athletic

Senior career*
Years	Team	Apps	(Gls)
2022–	Charlton Athletic	59	(7)
2023	→ Southend United (loan)	6	(4)
2025–2026	→ Walsall (loan)	40	(15)
2026–	→ Notts County (loan)	10	(2)

International career^{‡}
2023–	Sierra Leone	12	(2)
- * Club domestic league appearances and goals as of 17:10, 21 November 2026 (UTC) ‡ National team caps and goals as of 22:10, 17 November 2026 (UTC)

Daniel Malanga Kanu (born 14 November 2004) is a professional footballer who plays as a forward for EFL League One club Notts County on loan from EFL Championship side Charlton Athletic. Born in England, he plays for the Sierra Leone national team.

== Club career ==
=== Charlton Athletic ===
Kanu joined Charlton Athletic at under-11 level. On 2 February 2022, after scoring 31 goals in all competitions across Charlton's youth sides, Kanu signed his first professional contract with the club. Ten days later, on 12 February 2022, Kanu made his debut for Charlton, coming on as an 82nd-minute substitute in a 2–1 League One loss against Wigan Athletic.

On 22 November 2022, Kanu scored his first professional goal for the club in a 3–2 defeat away at Plymouth Argyle in the EFL Trophy.

On 7 February 2024, it was announced that Kanu had signed a new long-term contract with the club. He signed an extension in summer 2025, keeping him at the club until 2028.

==== Southend United (loan) ====
On 6 October 2023, Kanu joined National League side Southend United on an initial 28-day loan. On his first start, Kanu scored his first goals for the club, netting four times in a 5–0 victory over Solihull Moors.

On 2 December 2023, Kanu was recalled early by Charlton Athletic from his loan.

==== Walsall (loan) ====
On 22 August 2025, Kanu joined EFL League Two side Walsall on a season-long loan. Following a strong start to his time with the club, he was named EFL Young Player of the Month for September 2025. He was named League Two Young Player of the Season at the 2026 EFL Awards. At the club's End of Season awards, he was named Young Player of the Season, Players' Player of the Season and Player of the Season, in addition to finishing top scorer.

==== Notts County (loan) ====
On 31 August 2026, Kanu joined EFL League One side Notts County on a season-long loan.

== International career ==
Born in England, Kanu is of Sierra Leonean descent. He was called up to the Sierra Leone national team for a set of 2026 FIFA World Cup qualification matches in November 2023.

Kanu made his international debut for Sierra Leone on 19 November 2023, coming on as a second-half substitute in a 2–0 defeat to the Egypt national team.

== Personal life ==
Born in Lambeth, Kanu moved with his family to Dartford when he was two years old. He attended Dartford Grammar School, where he represented his school on numerous occasions as part of the athletics team. He specialised in long-distance running and set a handful of school records.

== Career statistics ==
=== Club ===
As of match played 21 November 2026

Appearances and goals by club, season and competition
Club	Season	League			FA Cup		EFL Cup		Other		Total	
Club	Season	Division	Apps	Goals	Apps	Goals	Apps	Goals	Apps	Goals	Apps	Goals
Charlton Athletic	2021–22	League One	2	0	0	0	0	0	0	0	2	0
Charlton Athletic	2022–23	League One	10	0	0	0	0	0	4 (Note: Appearances in EFL Trophy)	1	14	1
Charlton Athletic	2023–24	League One	30	6	1	0	1	1	2	0	34	7
Charlton Athletic	2024–25	League One	17	1	0	0	1	0	2	0	20	1
Charlton Athletic	2025–26	Championship	0	0	0	0	1	0	—		1	0
Charlton Athletic	2026–27	Championship	0	0	0	0	0	0	—		0	0
Charlton Athletic	Total		59	7	1	0	3	1	8	1	71	9
Southend United (loan)	2023–24	National League	6	4	0	0	—		0	0	6	4
Walsall (loan)	2025–26	League Two	40	15	3	2	—		1	1	44	18
Notts County (loan)	2026–27	League One	10	2	1	0	—		1	0	12	2
Career total			115	28	5	2	3	1	10	2	133	33

=== International ===
As of match played 17 November 2026

International statistics
National team	Year	Apps	Goals
Sierra Leone	2023	1	0
Sierra Leone	2024	4	0
Sierra Leone	2025	0	0
Sierra Leone	2026	7	2
Total		12	2

Scores and results list Sierra Leone's goal tally first, score column indicates score after each Kanu goal.

List of international goals scored by Daniel Kanu
No.	Date	Venue	Opponent	Score	Result	Competition
1	30 March 2026	Sumgayit City Stadium, Sumgait, Azerbaijan	Azerbaijan	1–0	1–1 (8–9 p)	2026 FIFA Series
2	9 June 2026	Samuel Kanyon Doe Sports Complex, Paynesville, Liberia	Liberia	1–3	1–3	Friendly

== Honours ==
Individual

- Charlton Athletic Young Player of the Year: 2021–22, 2023–24
- EFL Young Player of the Month: September 2025
- EFL League Two Young Player of the Season: 2025–26
- Walsall Player of the Season: 2025–26
- Walsall Young Player of the Season: 2025–26
