= Jid Okeke =

German footballer (born 2004)

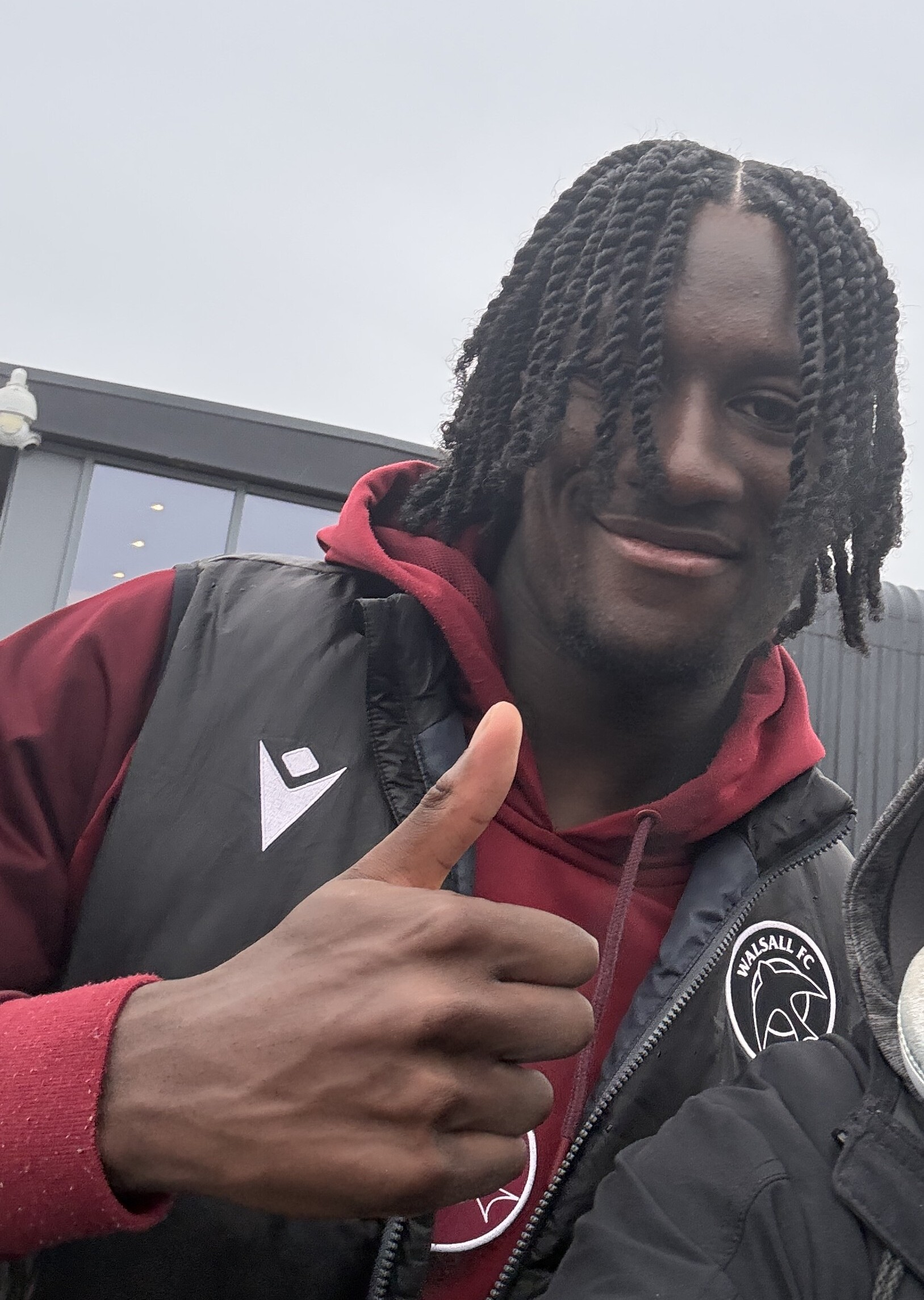
- Okeke in 2026

Personal information
- Full name: Favour Jidechi Okeke
- Date of birth: 11 November 2004 (age 22)
- Place of birth: Ahaus, Germany
- Height: 6 ft 3 in (1.91 m)
- Position: Right-back

Team information
- Current team: Waldhof Mannheim
- Number: 25

Youth career
- –2018: FC St. Pauli
- 2018–2023: Oldham Athletic
- 2023–: Stockport County

Senior career*
Years	Team	Apps	(Gls)
2022–2023	Oldham Athletic	0	(0)
2023	→ Stalybridge Celtic (loan)	0	(0)
2023–2026	Stockport County	2	(0)
2024	→ Chester (loan)	4	(0)
2024	→ Hereford (loan)	10	(1)
2024	→ South Shields (loan)	11	(0)
2024–2025	→ Rochdale (loan)	8	(0)
2025–2026	→ Walsall (loan)	13	(0)
2026	→ Walsall (loan)	12	(1)
2026–	Waldhof Mannheim	0	(0)
- * Club domestic league appearances and goals as of 07:21, 9 July 2026 (UTC)

Favour Jidechi Okeke (born 11 November 2004) is a German professional footballer who plays as a right-back for 3. Liga club Waldhof Mannheim.

== Career ==
=== Early career ===
Okeke began his career in Germany with FC St. Pauli, before moving to England and joining Oldham Athletic aged 13. In February 2023, Okeke joined Northern Premier League Premier Division club Stalybridge Celtic on a work experience loan, but only featured in one match day squad as a substitute and did not make an appearance.

=== Stockport County ===
Okeke was named as a substitute in a league fixture for the first time on 13 January 2024, but did not feature, in a 3–1 win at home against Walsall. On 19 January 2024, Okeke joined National League North club Chester on a six-week youth loan. On 5 March 2024, he joined National League North club Hereford on loan until the end of the season, making his debut the same day at right wing-back in a 4–1 league win away against Peterborough Sports. Okeke scored his first senior goal in football for Hereford on 23 March, the fourth goal in a 4–1 league win at home against Farsley Celtic.

Okeke made his senior debut for Stockport on 13 August 2024, playing the full match in a 6–1 EFL Cup defeat at home against Blackburn Rovers. Three days later, he joined National League North club South Shields on a six-month youth loan. After being recalled from his loan, on 31 October, Okeke joined National League club Rochdale on loan until the end of the season.

On 1 September 2025, Okeke joined League Two club Walsall on a season-long loan. He scored in his debut the following day in a 3–1 EFL Trophy win away against Shrewsbury Town. He made his English Football League debut on 6 September 2025, coming on as a substitute in the 75th minute in a 1–0 win at home against Chesterfield. On 5 January 2026, he was recalled by his parent club.

=== Return to Germany ===
In April 2026, it was announced that Okeke had returned to Germany to sign for 3. Liga club Waldhof Mannheim.

== Career statistics ==
As of match played 1 January 2026

Appearances and goals by club, season and competition
Club	Season	League			FA Cup		EFL Cup		Other		Total	
Club	Season	Division	Apps	Goals	Apps	Goals	Apps	Goals	Apps	Goals	Apps	Goals
Oldham Athletic	2022–23	National League	0	0	0	0	—		0	0	0	0
Stalybridge Celtic (loan)	2022–23	NPL Premier Division	0	0	0	0	—		0	0	0	0
Stockport County	2023–24	League Two	0	0	0	0	0	0	0	0	0	0
Stockport County	2024–25	League One	0	0	0	0	1	0	0	0	1	0
Stockport County	2025–26	League One	0	0	0	0	2	0	0	0	2	0
Stockport County	Total		0	0	0	0	3	0	0	0	3	0
Chester (loan)	2023–24	National League North	4	0	—		—		—		4	0
Hereford (loan)	2023–24	National League North	10	1	—		—		—		10	1
South Shields (loan)	2024–25	National League North	11	0	1	0	—		—		12	0
Rochdale (loan)	2024–25	National League	8	0	—		—		6 (Note: Three appearances and one goal in National League Cup, three appearances in FA Trophy)	1	14	1
Walsall (loan)	2025–26	League Two	13	0	1	0	—		4 (Note: Appearance in EFL Trophy)	1	18	1
Career total			46	1	2	0	3	0	10	1	61	3
