= Courtney Clarke =

Jamaican footballer

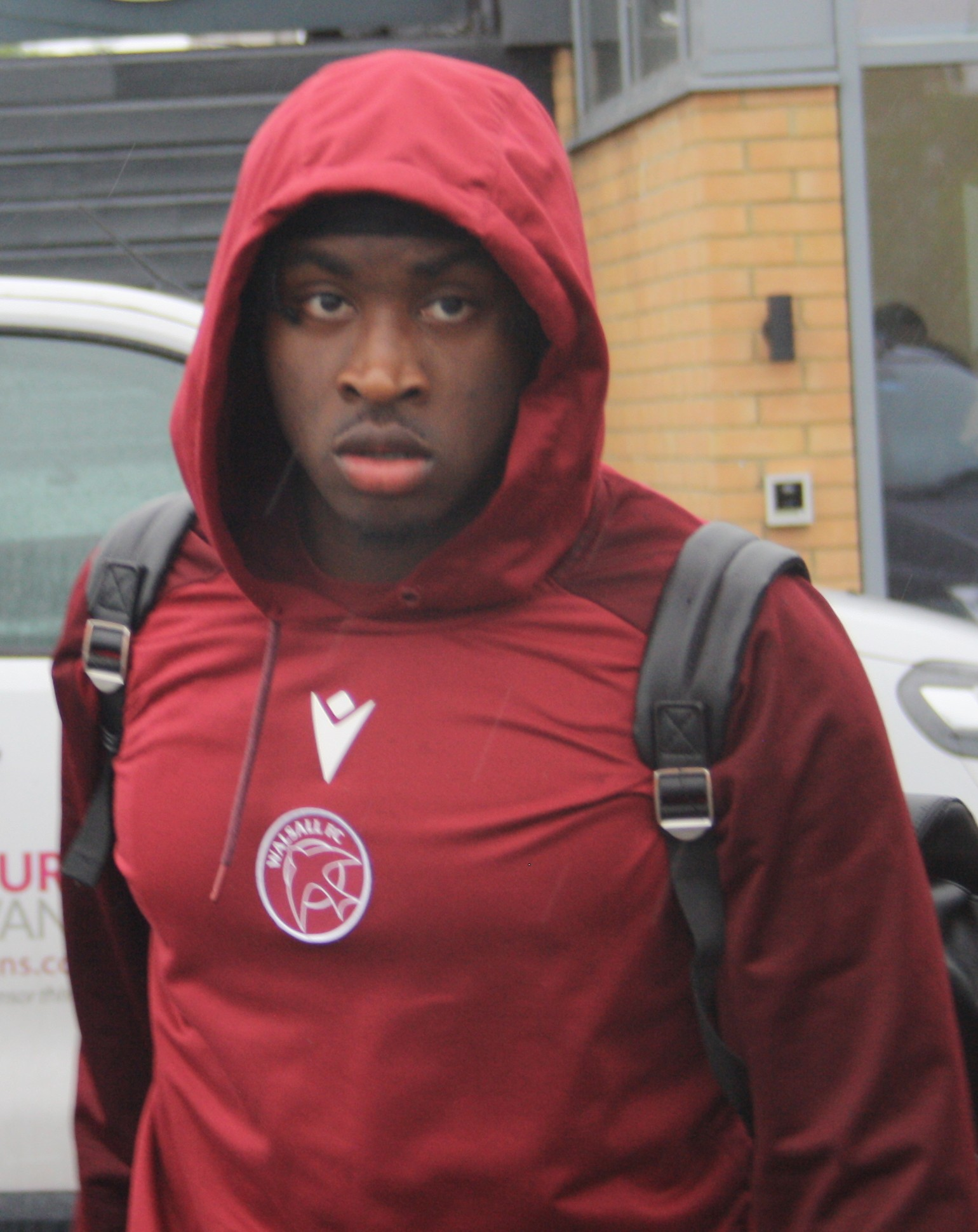
- Clarke in 2026

Personal information
- Full name: Courtney Jr Alphanso Clarke
- Date of birth: 20 April 2003 (age 23)
- Height: 1.80 m (5 ft 11 in)
- Position: Defender

Team information
- Current team: Walsall
- Number: 17

Youth career
- 2020–2023: Derby County

Senior career*
Years	Team	Apps	(Gls)
2023–2024	South Shields		
2024–2025	Eastbourne Borough	30	(3)
2025–	Walsall	53	(2)

International career^{‡}
2026–	Jamaica	6	(1)
- * Club domestic league appearances and goals as of 14:39, 22 November 2026 (UTC) ‡ National team caps and goals as of 22:01, 5 October 2026 (UTC)

Courtney Jr Alphanso Clarke (born 20 April 2003) is a professional footballer who plays as a defender for Walsall. Born in England, he plays for the Jamaica national team.

== Club career ==
After playing for Derby County, South Shields, and Eastbourne Borough, he signed for Walsall in June 2025. He said he wanted to represent the talent in non-league football, and was "grateful" to be playing in the Football League.

== International career ==
Clarke scored on his debut for Jamaica on 27 May 2026 during the 2–0 victory against India at the 2026 Unity Cup semi-finals.

== Career statistics ==
=== Club ===
As of match played 21 November 2026

Appearances and goals by club, season and competition
Club	Season	League			FA Cup		EFL Cup		Other		Total	
Club	Season	Division	Apps	Goals	Apps	Goals	Apps	Goals	Apps	Goals	Apps	Goals
South Shields	2023–24	National League North	5	0	0	0	—		1 (Note: Appearance in FA Trophy)	0	6	0
Eastbourne Borough	2024–25	National League	30	3	1	0	—		0	0	31	3
Walsall	2025–26	EFL League Two	41	1	2	1	1	0	5 (Note: Appearances in EFL Trophy)	0	48	2
Walsall	2026–27	League Two	12	1	1	0	2	0	1	0	16	1
Walsall	Total		53	2	3	1	3	0	6	0	64	3
Career total			88	5	4	1	3	0	7	0	101	6

=== International ===
As of match played 5 October 2026

Appearances and goals by national team and year
National team	Year	Apps	Goals
Jamaica	2026	6	1
Total		6	1

As of match played 31 May 2026
Nigeria score listed first, score column indicates score after each Clarke goal

List of international goals scored by Courtney Clarke
No.	Date	Venue	Cap	Opponent	Score	Result	Competition
1	27 May 2026	The Valley, London, England	1	India	1–0	2–0	2026 Unity Cup
