= Max Cream =

American soccer player (born 1987)

Personal information
- Full name: Max Ian Josef Cream
- Date of birth: August 29, 1987 (age 39)
- Place of birth: Los Angeles, California, United States
- Height: 5 ft 10 in (1.78 m)
- Positions: Attacking midfielder; striker

Youth career
- 2004: Dundee United
- 2005: Dunfermline Athletic

Senior career*
Years	Team	Apps	(Gls)
2004	Dundee United	0	(0)
2005	Dunfermline Athletic	0	(0)
2007	SV Meppen	12	(2)
2008	Shelbourne	2	(0)
2009	Cleveland City Stars	2	(0)
2009	Bournemouth FC	4	(2)
2010	Bashley	17	(1)
2010	Poole Town	4	(1)
2011	Bournemouth FC	6	(3)
2011	Wexford Youths	2	(0)
2011	Wimborne Town	18	(0)
2012	Bournemouth FC	12	(3)
- * Club domestic league appearances and goals as of 14 May 2011

Max Ian Josef Cream (born August 29, 1987) is an American former professional soccer player. He was a full-time professional with Scottish Premier League sides Dundee United and Dunfermline Athletic, former German 2. Bundesliga side SV Meppen, League of Ireland side Shelbourne and former USL side Cleveland City Stars in the US, before joining the English semi-professional ranks in 2009.

== Career ==
Cream began playing competitive football in Southern California at the age of five. At fifteen, he was invited to train with the Los Angeles Galaxy on a non trial basis. At sixteen Cream joined Stoke City on trial but was not offered a contract with the club. Cream began his professional career in Scotland at sixteen, signing for Dundee United before moving to SPL rivals Dunfermline Athletic shortly after.

At nineteen Cream returned to LA joining the Los Angeles Galaxy on trial. Cream played in two official first team friendlies, scoring on his debut against an Iran XI, the assist coming from USA soccer legend Alexi Lalas. Cream was offered a developmental contract with the club, however a management change saw Steve Sampson replaced by Frank Yallop. Yallop having not invited the player in for the trial, decided not to pursue the young striker any further. Cream subsequently returned to Europe.

After leaving LA, Cream went on trial with 1. Bundesliga sides Werder Bremen and Mainz 05 and 2. Bundesliga sides FC Cologne and Borussia Mönchengladbach. Cream eventually signed a professional contract with SV Meppen after the American was referred to the club by Werder Bremen coaching staff. He scored 2 goals in 12 league appearances before leaving the club by mutual consent. Whilst still under contract with Meppen, Cream trained with Dutch second-tier side BV Veendam, however all parties failed to agree terms on a transfer.

Cream signed for Dublin side Shelbourne after joining the club in pre-season. He made 2 league appearances and 1 cup appearance before leaving the club by mutual consent. Former Shelbourne teammate Greg O'Halloran facilitated a move to League of Ireland Premier side Cobh Ramblers, however the club were unable to sign the player due to well documented financial problems. Although a contract was never officially signed, Cream features for Cobh Ramblers on the video game FIFA 09. Cream returned to the US after a short stay in County Cork.

Cream returned to the US and in early 2009 signed a 2-year professional contract with the Cleveland City Stars. While at the Stars Cream suffered a serious ankle injury which ruled him out for the majority of the season. He made 2 league appearances before leaving by mutual consent in July 2009 to return to the UK.

After relocating to Bournemouth, UK in late 2009, Cream joined non-league football, playing for several local semi-professional sides.

In early 2011, Cream signed for Irish club Wexford Youths but after a short stay with the County Wexford club making two League of Ireland appearances, Cream returned to England to sign with Wimborne Town. On February 3, 2012, Cream signed for Bournemouth FC, making it his third spell with the club. Cream left Bournemouth FC on August 23, 2012.

== Personal life ==
Cream was born in Los Angeles, California to a British father and American mother. In 2011, he founded sports consultancy group ScholarSport, based in Southern California.
