= Jaume Camacho =

Spanish footballer (born 2009)

Personal information
- Full name: Jaume Camacho Sidos
- Date of birth: 5 October 2009 (age 17)
- Place of birth: Lleida, Spain
- Position: Midfielder

Team information
- Current team: Manchester United
- Number: 64

Youth career
- Years: Team
- City Football Schools
- Manchester United

Jaume Camacho Sidos (born 5 October 2009) is a Spanish footballer who plays as a midfielder for Manchester United.

== Early life ==
Camacho was born on 5 October 2009 in Lleida, Spain. At the age of four, he moved with his family to the United Arab Emirates.

== Career ==
As a youth player, Camacho joined the youth academy of Emirati side City Football Schools. Following his stint there, he joined the youth academy of English Premier League side Manchester United at the age of eleven after trialing for the youth academy of English Premier League outfit Manchester City.

In 2026, he was promoted to the club's under-18 team, where he played in the UEFA Youth League and was regarded to have established himself as a regular starter while playing for them. Eighteen months later, he was promoted to the Red Devils reserve team. In November 2026, Pochettino called him up for his first training with the first men’s team.

== Style of play ==
Camacho plays as a midfielder. English newspaper The Guardian wrote in 2026 that "Camacho is one of those players who can switch between midfield and full-back. He is tall, athletic and possesses a technical game".
