= Jonny Stuttle =

English footballer (born 2005)

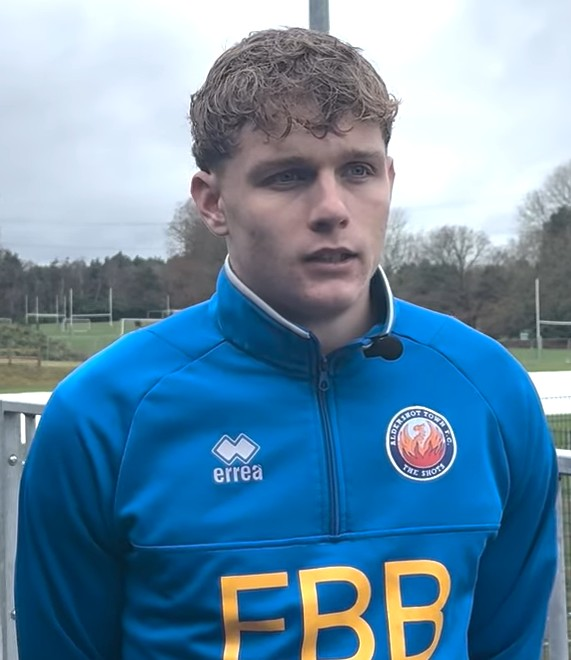
- Stuttle in December 2024

Personal information
- Full name: Jonathan Edward Stuttle
- Date of birth: 29 September 2005 (age 21)
- Place of birth: Weymouth, England
- Position: Striker

Team information
- Current team: Bournemouth

Youth career
- Weymouth
- Redlands
- 2016–2023: Bournemouth

Senior career*
Years	Team	Apps	(Gls)
2023–	Bournemouth	0	(0)
2024	→ Wimborne Town (loan)	7	(2)
2024–2025	→ Aldershot Town (loan)	6	(0)
2025	→ Farnborough (loan)	19	(10)
2025	→ Walsall (loan)	4	(0)
- * Club domestic league appearances and goals as of 03:32, 25 August 2025 (UTC)

Jonathan Edward Stuttle (born 29 September 2005) is an English professional footballer who plays as a striker for Premier League club Bournemouth.

== Career ==
Born in Weymouth, Stuttle spent his early career with Weymouth and Redlands.

Stuttle signed for AFC Bournemouth aged 11. After playing for the under-18s, he moved up to the Bournemouth under-21s, and in March 2024 he signed on loan for Wimborne Town. He scored on his debut for the club.

He joined Aldershot Town on loan in December 2024, being recalled in January 2025. Later that month he moved on loan to Farnborough, where he had a successful time, scoring 10 goals in 19 league games.

In July 2025 he signed a new contract with Bournemouth, before moving on loan to Walsall. The move was described as a "fantastic opportunity" by Bournemouth.

On 22 August 2025, he was recalled by AFC Bournemouth following a knee injury sustained in a League Two game against Grimsby Town.

== Style of play ==
Stuttle is known for being powerful and quick.

== Personal life ==
Stuttle comes from a fishing family.
