= George Webb (footballer, born 1991) =

English footballer (born 1991)

Personal information
- Full name: George Andrew Webb
- Date of birth: 1 May 1991 (age 35)
- Place of birth: Poole, England
- Height: 5 ft 10 in (1.78 m)
- Position: Midfielder

Youth career
- 2000–2008: AFC Bournemouth

Senior career*
Years	Team	Apps	(Gls)
2008–2009	AFC Bournemouth	2	(0)
2009	→ Dorchester Town (loan)	2	(0)
2009	Gosport Borough		
2009–2010	Bournemouth FC	18	(1)
2010–2011	Hamworthy United	23	(12)
2011	Bournemouth FC	18	(10)
2011–2012	Wimborne Town		
- * Club domestic league appearances and goals

George Andrew Webb (born 1 May 1991) is an English former footballer who played as a midfielder.

== Career ==
Born in Poole, Dorset, Webb began his career with Bournemouth, moving on loan to Dorchester Town in March 2009. He made his senior debut for Bournemouth in the Football League on 2 May 2009, in the last game of the 2008–09 season. He was released by Bournemouth on 27 October 2009, having made four appearances for the club in all competitions, and signed for Gosport Borough on a free transfer a day later. He later signed for Bournemouth FC, making his debut in December 2009. Webb moved to Hamworthy United in December 2010, and to Wimborne Town in May 2011.
