= Alex Parsons (footballer, born 1992) =

English footballer

Personal information
- Full name: Alexander Antony Parsons
- Date of birth: 7 September 1992 (age 34)
- Place of birth: Worthing, England
- Position: Midfielder

Team information
- Current team: Worthing

Youth career
- 2009–2011: Bournemouth

Senior career*
Years	Team	Apps	(Gls)
2011–2012	Bournemouth	5	(0)
2011	→ Wimborne Town (loan)		
2012	→ Bashley (loan)	2	(0)
2013–2014	Whitehawk	14	(0)
2014	Worthing	8	
2014–2017	Bognor Regis Town		
2017–	Worthing	104	
- * Club domestic league appearances and goals as of 30 June 2012

Alexander Antony Parsons (born 7 September 1992) is an English footballer who plays as a midfielder for Worthing.

Parsons was born in Worthing, West Sussex. He joined AFC Bournemouth on a two-year scholarship in the summer of 2009, and signed his first professional contract at the end of his scholarship. In August 2011, he and Dan Strugnell joined Southern League Division One club Wimborne Town on a three-month loan deal.

Parsons made his professional debut in Football League One for AFC Bournemouth on 2 January 2012, in a 2–0 League Two win over Wycombe Wanderers, coming on as a late substitute for Marc Pugh. Two weeks later, he joined Southern League Premier Division Bashley on a one-month loan. He was released at the end of the season by new manager Paul Groves. He trained with the Nike Football Academy after being on trial with Brighton & Hove Albion.
