= Dan Strugnell =

English footballer

Personal information
- Date of birth: 30 June 1992 (age 34)
- Place of birth: Christchurch, England
- Height: 6 ft 1 in (1.85 m)
- Position: Defender

Team information
- Current team: Gosport Borough

Youth career
- 2003–2011: Bournemouth

Senior career*
Years	Team	Apps	(Gls)
2011–2013	Bournemouth	1	(0)
2011	→ Wimborne Town (loan)	?	(?)
2012	→ Bashley (loan)	10	(0)
2012– 2013	→ Havant & Waterlooville (loan)	21	(3)
2013–2019	Havant & Waterlooville	263	(14)
2019	Dorchester Town	17	(0)
2019–	Gosport Borough	12	(1)
- * Club domestic league appearances and goals as of 19:45, 13 April 2020 (UTC)

Dan Strugnell (born 30 June 1992) is a former professional footballer who played as a defender for Gosport Borough.

== Career ==
Strugnell joined Bournemouth at under-12 level after being scouted from his junior school. In May 2011, he signed his first professional contract after graduating from the youth team, which he captained. In August 2011, he joined Southern Football League side Wimborne Town on a three-month loan deal. Strugnell made his professional debut on 18 February 2012, coming on as a substitute for Stephen Purches in a 1:0 defeat to Rochdale in Football League One. On 2 March 2012, Strugnell joined Southern Football League side Bashley on a one-month loan. In late November 2012, he joined Havant & Waterlooville on loan, finally signing with them after leaving Bournemouth in May 2013. He went on to become a regular at Havant & Waterlooville, playing over 250 times for the Hawks. He holds the record for second most appearances in league history.

A few days after leaving Dorchester Town in December 2019, Strugnell joined Gosport Borough.
