= Wimborne Town F.C. =

Association football club in England

Coordinates: 50°48′06″N 1°59′48″W

Wimborne Town
- Full name: Wimborne Town Football Club
- Nickname: The Magpies
- Founded: 1878
- Ground: The Wyatt Homes Stadium, Wimborne
- Capacity: 2,500
- Chairman: Tony Grant
- Manager: Tim Sills
- League: Southern League Premier Division South
- 2025–26: Southern League Premier Division South, 15th of 22
Home colours	Away colours

Wimborne Town Football Club is a semi-professional football club based in Wimborne Minster in Dorset, England. Established in 1878, the club plays in the Southern Premier South league, in the seventh tier of the English football league system. In 1992, the club won the FA Vase and in the 1982–83 season they reached the First Round Proper of the FA Cup for the first time.

The club is affiliated with the Dorset County Football Association and is an FA Charter Standard Club.

== Club history ==
Wimborne Town Football Club was formed in 1878 and originally catered for football and rugby. In 1884, Wimborne Town were one of the founder members of the South Hampshire and Dorset Football Association. In 1887, the club became a founder member of the Dorset County Football Association.

The club's first piece of Silverware was in 1913, when they won the Dorset Minor Cup for the only time in their history. They almost achieved more silverware a year later, when they finished as Runners up in the Dorset Junior Challenge Cup.

During the 1930s, Wimborne Town won the Dorset League Division Two championship three times, finished runners-up on a further occasion and were runners-up in Division One in 1939. They also enjoyed success in cup competitions, winning the Dorset Junior Challenge Cup twice in their final three appearances in the competition, as well as 1935 and 1939.

Wimborne Town's first senior honour came in 1937 by winning the Dorset Senior Amateur Cup and repeating this success in 1964. In 1957, Wimborne became founder members of the Dorset Combination (now the Dorset Premier League) but returned to the Dorset League after just a season where they remained until 1973, when they returned for another spell, this time lasting three seasons.

Wimborne's fortunes dramatically took off when they won the Dorset League Division One title in 1980–81 without losing a match. In 1981, following the installation of floodlights and the construction of a perimeter wall and new changing rooms at their Cuthbury ground, Wimborne Town were directly admitted to the First Division of the Western League. Despite missing out the Dorset Combination, they immediately made an impact by just losing out on third spot to local rivals Swanage Town & Herston on goal difference.

Wimborne Town entered both the FA Cup & FA Vase for the first time in 1982–83. That season brought them their best run to date in the FA Cup when defeats of Bridport, Falmouth Town, St Blazey, Bath City and Merthyr Tydfil earned them a visit to Aldershot, in the First Round Proper where they lost 0–4. 1984–85 was Wimborne Town's most successful season in the Western League when they finished in third place, this time ahead of Swanage on goal difference.

In 1987, Wimborne Town joined the Wessex League, which they played in up until the 2009–10 season, never finishing outside the top eight. The club have won the Wessex Championship on three occasions, in 1991–92, 1993–94, and 1999–2000— and finished runners-up in 1992–93, 1996–97, and 2009–10.

Before 1992, Wimborne Town's best performances in the FA Vase had brought them to the third round proper on three occasions. However, in 1991–92, the Club enjoyed a run to the Wembley final under joint managers Alex Pike and Nicky Jennings, where they defeated favourites Guiseley 5–3 to lift the trophy. In so doing, Wimborne Town became the first ever Dorset club at any level to contest a Wembley final. During that same season, Wimborne Town also won the Dorset Senior Challenge Cup and Wessex League championship to complete a treble of trophies.

They won the Wessex League Cup in 1993–94 becoming the first club to achieve the league and cup double. That feat was repeated in 1999–2000 when Wimborne Town finished ahead of Lymington & New Milton on goal difference in the league and beat them 1–0 in the League Cup final, the last time the club won this trophy was the 2007–08 season when they beat Moneyfields FC 1–0 at Christchurch's Hurn Bridge ground. At the end of the 2009–10 season, after years of ground grading issues, they were promoted to the Southern Football League (South & West Division) with a second-place finish in the league. They have since remained in the Southern League Division One South & West. In 2011–12, they reached the final of the Dorset Senior Cup, where they lost 2–0 to Dorchester Town at Hamworthy United Football Club. In 2014–15, Wimborne had reached its highest position with the current English football league pyramid system and achieved its highest run in the 1st Round of the FA Trophy.

In January 2016, the club unveiled Harry Redknapp as a director, his first return to football since leaving Queens Park Rangers in February 2015. During the 2017–18 season, Wimborne achieved a third-placed finish and despite defeat to Swindon Supermarine on penalties in the play-off final, Wimborne achieved promotion to Step 3 for the first time in their history following the withdrawal of Shaw Lane and the restructuring of the teams. They remained at this level for three seasons, suffering relegation in their fourth season at the level. This was the first season that the club played at their new stadium. Under the guidance of ex Torquay United striker Tim Sills, Wimborne bounced back at the second attempt, sealing promotion back to the Premier Division on the last day of the season at Melksham Town on 27 April 2024 and winning the league title in the process. This was their first league title win in 24 years.

In 2026, Wimborne had their best ever FA Cup run. Reaching the First Round for the first time since 1982 after beating Chelmsford City 1–0 in the FA Cup 4th Qualifying Round. They qualified for the Second Round for the first time in their history after beating League Two side Crawley Town 2-0. It was Wimborne's first ever win against a Football League club.

== Ground ==
Since 2020 Wimborne Town play their home games at New Cuthbury, 16 Ainsley Road, Wimborne, BH21 2FU . Previously, they played at Cuthbury which was on the other (western) side of Wimborne Minster next to Victoria Hospital. The new ground is owned by the local council and the club have a long lease from them. The ground was renamed the Wyatt Homes Stadium for the 2024/25 season.

The ground includes a large clubhouse overlooking the main pitch, which is grass with floodlights and a 3G practice pitch adjacent. The Stadium conforms to FA grading regulations for games at Step 3 Southern League Premier and has two stands with seating for 250. Both ends of the pitch are covered standing. There is a car park for 200 cars, plus disabled and coach spaces. The whole site can be booked for private functions. The bar and clubhouse are open to the public on non-match days.

== Club honours ==
=== League honours ===
- Wessex League Premier Division:
  - Winners: 1991–92, 1993–94, 1999–00
  - Runners-up: 1992–93, 1996–97, 2003–04, 2009–10
- Dorset League Division One:
  - Winners: 1980–81
  - Runners-up: 1938–39
- Southern League Division One South
  - Winners: 2023–24

=== Cup honours ===
- FA Vase:
  - Winners: 1991–92
- Dorset Senior Cup:
  - Winners: 1991–92, 1996–97, 2017–18
  - Runners-up: 1998–99, 1999–00, 2009–10, 2011–12, 2012–13
- Wessex League Cup:
  - Winners: 1990–91, 1993–94, 1996–97, 1999–00, 2007–08
- Dorset Senior Amateur Cup:
  - Winners: 1936–37, 1963–64
- Dorset Minor Cup:
  - Winners: 1912–13
- Dorset Junior Challenge Cup:
  - Runners-up: 1913–14

== Club records ==
- Highest league position: 10th in Southern League Premier South, 2024–25
- FA Cup best performance: Second round, 2026–27
- FA Trophy best performance: First round, 2014–15, 2025–26
- FA Vase best performance: Winners, 1991–92
- Record attendance: 3,300 vs Crawley Town, FA Cup First Round, 08 November 2026

== Former and current notable players ==
1. Players that have played/managed in the football league or any foreign equivalent to this level (i.e. fully professional league).
2. Players with full international caps.

- (England) David Town
- (England) Thomas Clarke
- (England) Dan Strugnell
- (England) Alex Parsons
- (England) Josh Wakefield
- (England) Christer Warren
- (England) Luther Blissett
- (United States) Max Cream
- (England) Mark Ovendale
- (Scotland) Steve Welsh
- (England) Jason Harvell
- (England) George Webb
- (United States) Patrick Wilson
- (Bermuda) Ajani Burchall
