= 2026–27 Walsall F.C. season =

Walsall
2026–27 season
- Owner: Trivela Group
- Co-chairman: Benjamin Boycott, Leigh Pomlett
- Head coach: Lee Grant
- Stadium: Bescot Stadium

The 2026–27 season is the 139th season in the history of Walsall Football Club and their eighth consecutive season in League Two. The club are participating in League Two, the FA Cup, the EFL Cup, and the EFL Trophy.

== Managerial changes ==
Prior to the season starting, the club appointed Lee Grant as the new Head Coach on a three-year deal.

== Transfers and contracts ==
=== In ===
| Date | Pos. | Player | From | Fee | Ref. |
|---|---|---|---|---|---|
| 27 June 2026 | CM | (Austria) Sven Sprangler | (Scotland) St Johnstone | Undisclosed | |
| 1 July 2026 | CB | (Wales) James Connolly | (England) Crewe Alexandra | Free | |
| 1 July 2026 (Note: The transfer was announced on 17 June, and would become official on July 1 once Dallas' contract at Barnsley expired.) | CF | (Scotland) Andrew Dallas | (England) Barnsley | Free | |
| 1 July 2026 (Note: The transfer was announced on 22 June, and would become official on July 1 once Simper's contract at Sutton expired.) | CM | (England) Lewis Simper | (England) Sutton United | Free | |
| 10 July 2026 | GK | (England) Jed Ward | (England) Bristol Rovers | Undisclosed | |
| 17 July 2026 | CF | (England) Tai Sodje | (England) Buxton | Undisclosed | |
| 21 July 2026 | CB | (Wales) Ryan Leak | (Scotland) Ross County | Free | |
| 28 July 2026 | LW | (England) Reece Smith | (England) Harrogate Town | Undisclosed | |
| 11 August 2026 | RB | (England) Roman Dixon | (England) Everton | Free | |
| 18 August 2026 | GK | (England) Tom Wooster | (England) West Ham United | Free | |
| 24 August 2026 | LB | (Republic of Ireland) James Furlong | (Slovenia) Maribor | Free | |

=== Loaned in ===
| Date | Pos. | Player | From | Loaned until | Ref. |
|---|---|---|---|---|---|
| 7 July 2026 | CM | (England) Isaac Moore | (England) Coventry City | End of Season | |
| 21 July 2026 | CB | (England) Declan Skura | (England) Wycombe Wanderers | End of Season | |
| 5 August 2026 | CDM | (Wales) Charlie Crew | (England) Leeds United | End of Season | |
| 1 September 2026 | CAM | (England) Antony Evans | (England) Huddersfield Town | End of Season | |

=== Loaned out ===
| Date | Pos. | Player | To | Loaned until | Ref. |
|---|---|---|---|---|---|
| 14 August 2026 | LWB | (Kenya) Vincent Harper | (England) Exeter City | End of Season | |
| 28 August 2026 | CM | (England) Will Etheridge | (England) Stourbridge | 26 September 2026 | |
| 21 September 2026 | GK | (England) Jenson Kilroy | (England) Malvern Town | 19 October 2026 | |
| 25 September 2026 | LM | (Republic of Ireland) Ronan Maher | (England) Wealdstone | 26 December 2026 | |
| 29 September 2026 | CB | (England) Stan Straw | (England) Redditch United | 3 January 2027 (Note: On 3 November, Straw's initial one-month loan at Redditch was extended until January.) | |
| 17 October 2026 | CB | (Saint Kitts and Nevis) Rico Browne | (England) Woking | January 2027 | |

=== Out ===
| Date | Pos. | Player | To | Fee | Ref. |
|---|---|---|---|---|---|
| 15 June 2026 (Note: The transfer was announced on 10 June, and would become official on June 15 once the transfer window opened.) | RB | (England) Connor Barrett | (England) Wigan Athletic | Undisclosed | |
| 15 June 2026 | GK | (England) Sam Hornby | (England) Hednesford Town | Free transfer | |

=== Released / Out of Contract ===
| Date | Pos. | Player | Subsequent club | Joined date | Ref. |
|---|---|---|---|---|---|
| 30 June 2026 | CDM | (Montserrat) Brandon Comley | (England) Barnet | 1 July 2026 | |
| 30 June 2026 | CB | (England) Priestley Farquharson | (England) Crawley Town | 1 July 2026 | |
| 30 June 2026 | CF | (England) Josh Gordon | (England) Exeter City | 1 July 2026 | |
| 30 June 2026 | CAM | (Australia) Jake Hollman | (Australia) Sydney | 1 July 2026 | |
| 30 June 2026 | CM | (England) Charlie Lakin | (England) Barnet | 1 July 2026 | |
| 30 June 2026 | CF | (Jamaica) Jamille Matt | (England) Bromsgrove Sporting | 1 July 2026 | |
| 30 June 2026 | LB | (Republic of Ireland) Evan Weir | (England) Peterborough United | 1 July 2026 | |
| 30 June 2026 | CF | (England) Charlie Wragg | (England) Stourbridge | 1 July 2026 | |
| 30 June 2026 | CM | (England) Jamie Jellis | (England) Rotherham United | 10 July 2026 | |
| 30 June 2026 | CM | (England) Dylan Thomas | (England) Lichfield City | 7 August 2026 | |
| 30 June 2026 | CB | (England) Aden Flint | (England) Rochdale | 11 September 2026 | |
| 30 June 2026 | CDM | (England) Alfie Chang | | | |

=== New Contract ===
| Date | Pos. | Player | Contract until | Ref. |
|---|---|---|---|---|
| 6 May 2026 | RB | (England) Elicha Ahui | 30 June 2027 | |
| 6 May 2026 | GK | (England) Jenson Kilroy | 30 June 2027 | |
| 5 June 2026 | RW | (Ghana) Albert Adomah | 30 June 2027 | |
| 23 June 2026 | CB | (Saint Kitts and Nevis) Rico Browne | 30 June 2028 (Note: Option of a further year in the club's favour) | |

== Pre-season and friendlies ==
On 5 June, Saddlers announced a pre-season fixture against Aston Villa. Four days later, two further fixtures were added to the scheduled against Leamington and AFC Telford United. On 24 June, a fourth friendly was added against Notts County.

Win Draw Loss Fixtures

| 11 July 2026 Friendly | Leamington | 0–0 | Walsall | Leamington Spa |
| 15:00 BST | | Report | | Stadium: Your Co-op Community Stadium |

| 18 July 2026 Friendly | Nottingham Forest U21 | 2–4 | Walsall | West Bridgford |
| 15:00 BST | | Report | Dallas (x2); Pressley; Sjordesma | Stadium: Nigel Doughty Academy; Attendance: 0 (BCD) |

| 21 July 2026 Friendly | Walsall | 0–5 | Aston Villa | Bescot |
| 19:30 BST | | Report | Madjo 24', 45'; Hemmings 43'; Lynch 68'; Borland 70' | Stadium: Pallet-Track Bescot Stadium |

| 25 July 2026 Friendly | AFC Telford United | 1–0 | Walsall | Wellington |
| 15:00 BST | Trialist A 30' | Report | | Stadium: SEAH Stadium |

| 29 July 2026 Friendly | Luton Town | 5–0 | Walsall | Luton |
| 14:00 BST | Benagr (x2); Luker; Morris; Wells | Report | | Stadium: The Brache; Attendance: 0 (BCD) |

| 1 August 2026 Friendly | Walsall | 0–0 | Notts County | Bescot |
| 15:00 BST | | Report | | Stadium: Pallet-Track Bescot Stadium; Attendance: 1,448 (272 away) |

== Competitions ==
=== League Two ===
==== League table ====
| Pos | Team | Pld | W | D | L | GF | GA | GD | Pts | Promotion, qualification or relegation |
|---|---|---|---|---|---|---|---|---|---|---|
| 1 | Salford City | 14 | 10 | 1 | 3 | 25 | 15 | +10 | 31 | Promotion to EFL League One |
| 2 | Barnet | 13 | 7 | 5 | 1 | 28 | 18 | +10 | 26 | Promotion to EFL League One |
| 3 | Walsall | 13 | 5 | 7 | 1 | 21 | 12 | +9 | 22 | Promotion to EFL League One |
| 4 | Crewe Alexandra | 14 | 5 | 7 | 2 | 17 | 17 | 0 | 22 | Qualification for League Two play-offs |
| 5 | Cheltenham Town | 14 | 6 | 3 | 5 | 23 | 25 | −2 | 21 | Qualification for League Two play-offs |

Updated to match(es) played on 3 November 2026. Source: EFL Official Website
Rules for classification: 1) Points; 2) Goal difference; 3) Number of goals scored; 4) Head-to-head results; 5) Wins; 6) Away goals; 7) Penalty points (sec 9.5); 8) 12-point sending off offences

==== Results summary ====
| Overall | | | | | | | | Home | | | | | | Away | | | | | |
| Pld | W | D | L | GF | GA | GD | Pts | W | D | L | GF | GA | GD | W | D | L | GF | GA | GD |
|---|---|---|---|---|---|---|---|---|---|---|---|---|---|---|---|---|---|---|---|
| 13 | 5 | 7 | 1 | 21 | 12 | +9 | 22 | 3 | 2 | 1 | 10 | 6 | +4 | 2 | 5 | 0 | 11 | 6 | +5 |

Last updated: 31 October 2026.
Source: Soccerway

==== Results by round ====
| Round | 1 | 2 | 3 | 4 | 5 | 6 | 7 | 8 | 10 | 11 | 12 | 13 | 14 | 15^{2} | 16 | 17 | 18 | 19 | 9^{1} | 20 | 21 | 22 | 23 | 24 | 25 | 26 | 27 | 28 | 29 | 30 | 31 | 32 | 33 |
|---|---|---|---|---|---|---|---|---|---|---|---|---|---|---|---|---|---|---|---|---|---|---|---|---|---|---|---|---|---|---|---|---|---|
| Ground | A | H | H | A | A | H | H | A | A | A | H | H | A | H | A | H | A | A | H | H | A | H | H | A | H | A | A | H | A | H | H | A | A |
| Result | W | D | W | D | D | D | W | D | D | D | W | L | W | P | | | | | | | | | | | | | | | | | | | |
| Position | 1 | 3 | 2 | 3 | 5 | 5 | 2 | 5 | 6 | 5 | 4 | 6 | 3 | P | | | | | | | | | | | | | | | | | | | |
| Points | 3 | 4 | 7 | 8 | 9 | 10 | 13 | 14 | 15 | 16 | 19 | 19 | 22 | P | | | | | | | | | | | | | | | | | | | |

Source: EFL
A = Away; H = Home; W = Win; D = Draw; L = Loss; P = Postponed
Notes:
- ^{1} Matchday 9 (vs. Crawley Town) was postponed due to international call-ups.
- ^{2} Matchday 15 (vs. Barnet) was postponed due to international call-ups.

==== Matches ====
On 25 June, the League Two fixtures were revealed.

Win Draw Loss Fixtures

| 15 August 2026 1 | Gillingham | 0–3 | Walsall | Gillingham |
| 15:00 BST | Smith (yellow card) 41'; Harris (yellow card) 47'; McKenzie (yellow card) 58'; Hale (yellow card) 90+3' | Report | Ahui (yellow card) 56'; Crew (yellow card) 56'; Moore 81'; Connolly 89'; Pressley 90+6' | Stadium: Priestfield Stadium; Attendance: 6,125 (511 away); Referee: Emily Heaslip |

| 22 August 2026 2 | Walsall | 0–0 | Grimsby Town | Bescot |
| 12:30 BST | Connolly (yellow card) 74' | Report | Sweeney (yellow card) 68' | Stadium: Pallet-Track Bescot Stadium; Attendance: 6,499 (1,167 away); Referee: Matthew Russell |
Note: Fixture was initially scheduled for a 15:00 kick-off, but was brought forward for live Sky Sports broadcasting.

| 29 August 2026 3 | Walsall | 3–2 | Accrington Stanley | Bescot |
| 15:00 BST | Smith 8'; Burke 45+6'; Sprangler (yellow card) 49'; Pressley 53'; Moore (yellow card) 75'; Skura (yellow card) 79'; Ahui (yellow card) 90+1' | Report | Woods 12'; Mols 57'; Coyle (yellow card) 60'; Walton (yellow card) 75'; Conneely (yellow card) 90+9' | Stadium: Pallet-Track Bescot Stadium; Attendance: 5,116 (115 away); Referee: William Davis |

| 1 September 2026 4 | Crewe Alexandra | 2–2 | Walsall | Crewe |
| 19:45 BST | March 50'; Hutchinson 90+2' | Report | Pressley 42' (pen.), 57'; Simper (yellow card) 75'; Sodje (yellow card) 88' | Stadium: Mornflake Stadium; Attendance: 4,918 (1,127 away); Referee: Oliver Mackey |

| 5 September 2026 5 | Exeter City | 0–0 | Walsall | Exeter |
| 15:00 BST | | Report | Ahui (yellow card) 77' | Stadium: St James Park; Attendance: 6,002 (755 away); Referee: Harrison Blair |

| 12 September 2026 6 | Walsall | 0–0 | Rochdale | Bescot |
| 15:00 BST | Crew (yellow card) 29' | Report | Adeeko (yellow card) 53'; Gilmour (yellow card) 77'; Middelton (yellow card) 90+4' | Stadium: Pallet-Track Bescot Stadium; Attendance: 5,669 (381 away); Referee: Jamie O'Connor |

| 19 September 2026 7 | Walsall | 2–0 | Port Vale | Bescot |
| 12:30 BST | Sprangler (yellow card) 27'; Ahui (yellow card) 40'; Connolly 45+5', (yellow card) 50'; Dallas 89' | Report | Dempsey (yellow card) 51'; Garrity (yellow card) 84'; Moon (yellow card) 90+3' | Stadium: Pallet-Track Bescot Stadium; Attendance: 6,902 (1,311 away); Referee: James Oldham |
Note: Fixture was initially scheduled for a 15:00 kick-off, but was brought forward for live Sky Sports broadcasting.

| 26 September 2026 8 | Tranmere Rovers | 1–1 | Walsall | Birkenhead |
| 15:00 BST | Ironside (penalty missed) 35'; Browne 73' | Report | Sprangler (yellow card) 18'; Connolly (yellow card) 35'; Smith 90+1' | Stadium: Prenton Park; Attendance: 7,229 (802 away); Referee: Stephen Parkinson |

| 10 October 2026 10 | Fleetwood Town | 1–1 | Walsall | Fleetwood |
| 15:00 BST | Bennett (yellow card) 54'; Coughlan 61'; Neal (yellow card) 74'; McCann (yellow card) 76'; Helm (yellow card) 80' | Report | Spranger (yellow card) 48'; Smith (yellow card) 76'; Pressley 82'; Moore (yellow card) 90+1' | Stadium: Highbury Stadium; Attendance: 3,212 (759 away); Referee: Jamie Robinson |

| 17 October 2026 11 | Swindon Town | 1–1 | Walsall | Swindon |
| 15:00 BST | Drinan 82'; Ball (yellow card) 77' | Report | Sodje 55' | Stadium: The Nigel Eady County Ground; Attendance: 7,197 (612 away); Referee: Alex Chilowicz |

| 20 October 2026 12 | Walsall | 3–0 | Oldham Athletic | Bescot |
| 19:45 BST | Sodje (yellow card) 9', (goal) 21'; Crew (yellow card) 20'; Pressley 26', 58' (pen.); Simper (yellow card) 32'; Ahui (red card) 61' | Report | Robson (yellow card) 40'; Hudson (yellow card) 58'; Fawunmi (yellow card) 62' | Stadium: Pallet-Track Bescot Stadium; Attendance: 5,147 (728 away); Referee: Alan Dale |

| 26 October 2026 13 | Walsall | 2–4 | Salford City | Bescot |
| 20:00 BST | Pressley 58'; Simper 66'; Moore (yellow card) 70' | Report | Langstaff 45'; Grant 54'; Cesay 67'; Oluwo 82' | Stadium: Pallet-Track Bescot Stadium; Attendance: 6,395 (326 away); Referee: Martin Coy |
Note: Fixture was initially scheduled for 24 October, but was pushed back two days for live Sky Sports broadcasting.

| 31 October 2026 14 | Colchester United | 1–3 | Walsall | Colchester |
| 15:00 GMT | Payne 35' (pen.); Digby (yellow card) 77' | Report | Skura 3'; Ahui (yellow card) 34'; Simper (yellow card) 68'; Pressley 79'; Hancock (yellow card) 83'; Clarke 90+6' | Stadium: JobServe Community Stadium; Attendance: 4,122 (264 away); Referee: Declan Brown |

| 14 November 2026 15 | Walsall | Postponed | Barnet | Bescot |
| 15:00 GMT | | | | Stadium: Pallet-Track Bescot Stadium |
Note: Fixture was postponed due to international call-ups.

| 21 November 2026 16 | York City | v | Walsall | Huntington |
| 15:00 GMT | | | | Stadium: LNER Community Stadium |

| 28 November 2026 17 | Walsall | v | Northampton Town | Bescot |
| 15:00 GMT | | | | Stadium: Pallet-Track Bescot Stadium |

| 1 December 2026 18 | Newport County | v | Walsall | Newport |
| 19:45 GMT | | | | Stadium: Rodney Parade |

| 12 December 2026 19 | Rotherham United | v | Walsall | Rotherham |
| 15:00 GMT | | | | Stadium: AESSEAL New York Stadium |

| 15 December 2026 9 | Walsall | v | Crawley Town | Bescot |
| 19:45 GMT | | | | Stadium: Pallet-Track Bescot Stadium |
Note: Fixture was originally scheduled for 3 October, but was postponed due to international call-ups. It was then rescheduled for 15 December.

| 19 December 2026 20 | Walsall | v | Shrewsbury Town | Bescot |
| 15:00 GMT | | | | Stadium: Pallet-Track Bescot Stadium |

| 26 December 2026 21 | Bristol Rovers | v | Walsall | Horfield |
| 15:00 GMT | | | | Stadium: Memorial Stadium |

| 29 December 2026 22 | Walsall | v | Chesterfield | Bescot |
| 19:45 GMT | | | | Stadium: Pallet-Track Bescot Stadium |

| 1 January 2027 23 | Walsall | v | Cheltenham Town | Bescot |
| 15:00 GMT | | | | Stadium: Pallet-Track Bescot Stadium |

| 9 January 2027 24 | Shrewsbury Town | v | Walsall | Shrewsbury |
| 15:00 GMT | | | | Stadium: Croud Meadow |
Note: Fixture was initially scheduled for a 15:00 kick-off, but was brought forward for live Sky Sports broadcasting.

| 16 January 2027 25 | Walsall | v | Swindon Town | Bescot |
| 15:00 GMT | | | | Stadium: Pallet-Track Bescot Stadium |

| 19 January 2027 26 | Oldham Athletic | v | Walsall | Oldham |
| 19:45 GMT | | | | Stadium: Boundary Park |

| 23 January 2027 27 | Salford City | v | Walsall | Kersal |
| 12:30 GMT | | | | Stadium: AIG Stadium |
Note: Fixture was initially scheduled for a 15:00 kick-off, but was brought forward for live Sky Sports broadcasting.

| 30 January 2027 28 | Walsall | v | Colchester United | Bescot |
| 15:00 GMT | | | | Stadium: Pallet-Track Bescot Stadium |

| 6 February 2027 29 | Accrington Stanley | v | Walsall | Accrington |
| 15:00 GMT | | | | Stadium: Wham Stadium |

| 9 February 2027 30 | Walsall | v | Crewe Alexandra | Bescot |
| 20:00 GMT | | | | Stadium: Pallet-Track Bescot Stadium |
Note: Fixture was initially scheduled for a 19:45 kick-off, but was pushed back for live Sky Sports broadcasting.

| 13 February 2027 31 | Walsall | v | Exeter City | Bescot |
| 15:00 GMT | | | | Stadium: Pallet-Track Bescot Stadium |

| 18 February 2027 32 | Rochdale | v | Walsall | Spotland |
| 20:00 GMT | | | | Stadium: Crown Oil Arena |
Note: Fixture was initially scheduled for 20 February, but was brought forward to Thursday night for live Sky Sports broadcasting.

| 27 February 2027 33 | Barnet | v | Walsall | Edgware |
| 12:30 GMT | | | | Stadium: The Hive Stadium |
Note: Fixture was initially scheduled for a 15:00 kick-off, but was brought forward for live Sky Sports broadcasting.

=== FA Cup ===
Walsall were drawn away to Newport County in the first round.

Win Draw Loss Fixtures

| 7 November 2026 First round | Newport County | 3–1 | Walsall | Newport |
| 15:00 GMT | Etete 19', 60'; Adu-Poku 23' | Report | Dallas 7'; Crew (yellow card) 28'; Hancock (yellow card) 59'; Smith (yellow card) 88' | Stadium: Rodney Parade; Attendance: 3,205 (495 away); Referee: Rob Massey-Ellis |

=== EFL Cup ===
Saddlers were drawn away to Bristol City in the first round and home to Leyton Orient in the second round.

Win Draw Loss Fixtures

| 6 August 2026 First round | Bristol City | 0–1 | Walsall | Bristol |
| 19:45 BST | | Report | Pressley 47'; Moore (yellow card) 56'; Sprangler (yellow card) 67'; Browne (yellow card) 90+2' | Stadium: Ashton Gate; Attendance: 9,992 (564 away); Referee: Jacob Miles |
Note: Fixture was initially scheduled for 7 August, but was brought forward 24-hours to avoid a clash with the Bristol International Balloon Fiesta.

| 25 August 2026 Second round | Walsall | 0–0 (5–6 p) | Leyton Orient | Walsall |
| 19:45 BST | | Report | | Stadium: Bescot Stadium; Attendance: 2,679 (242 away); Referee: Andrew Humphries |
| | Penalties |
| | Simper (penalty missed); Clarke (penalty scored); Hancock (penalty scored); Sodje (penalty scored); Pressley (penalty scored); Crew (penalty scored); Skura (penalty missed) | | (penalty missed) Kabia; (penalty scored) Hayden; (penalty scored) Archibald; (penalty scored) El Mizouni; (penalty scored) Obiero; (penalty scored) Stevens; (penalty scored) Olowu |

=== EFL Trophy ===
==== Group stage ====
Walsall were drawn against Leicester City, Stevenage and Fulham U21 into Southern Group B.

| Pos | Div | Team | Pld | W | PW | PL | L | GF | GA | GD | Pts | Qualification |
|---|---|---|---|---|---|---|---|---|---|---|---|---|
| 1 | L1 | Stevenage | 3 | 2 | 1 | 0 | 0 | 10 | 4 | +6 | 8 | Advance to Round 2 |
| 2 | L1 | Leicester City | 3 | 2 | 0 | 0 | 1 | 9 | 4 | +5 | 6 | Advance to Round 2 |
| 3 | L2 | Walsall | 3 | 1 | 0 | 0 | 2 | 5 | 10 | −5 | 3 | |
| 4 | ACA | Fulham U21 | 3 | 0 | 0 | 1 | 2 | 5 | 11 | −6 | 1 | |

Source: EFL

Win Draw Loss Fixtures

| 22 September 2026 Group stage | Walsall | 1–6 | Stevenage | Bescot |
| 19:00 BST | Simper 17' | Report | Mellon 11', 42', 58'; Marçal 29'; Houghton 32'; Broggio 63' | Stadium: Pallet-Track Bescot Stadium; Attendance: 1,205; Referee: Robert Massey-Ellis |

| 13 October 2026 Group stage | Walsall | 3–2 | Fulham U21 | Bescot |
| 19:00 BST | Sodje 25', 30'; Furlong 44' | Report | Kus-Asare 54'; Casey 71'; Slade (yellow card) 78'; Cook (yellow card) 81' | Stadium: Pallet-Track Bescot Stadium; Referee: Alan Young |

| 10 November 2026 Group stage | Leicester City | 2–1 | Walsall | Leicester |
| 19:00 GMT | Lundstram 20'; Smallbone 32'; Aluko (yellow card) 56' | Report | Dallas 10' | Stadium: King Power Stadium; Attendance: 3,083; Referee: Michael Barlow |

== Statistics ==
=== Appearances and goals ===
As of match played 10 November 2026

Players with no appearances are not included on the list; italics indicate loaned in player

| No. | Pos | Nat | Player | Total | | League Two | | FA Cup | | EFL Cup | | EFL Trophy | |
| No. | Pos | Nat | Player | Apps | Goals | Apps | Goals | Apps | Goals | Apps | Goals | Apps | Goals |
|---|---|---|---|---|---|---|---|---|---|---|---|---|---|
| 1 | GK | (England) ENG | Jed Ward | 16 | 0 | 13+0 | 0 | 1+0 | 0 | 2+0 | 0 | 0+0 | 0 |
| 2 | DF | (Saint Kitts and Nevis) SKN | Rico Browne | 5 | 0 | 1+1 | 0 | 0+0 | 0 | 1+1 | 0 | 1+0 | 0 |
| 3 | DF | (England) ENG | Mason Hancock | 16 | 0 | 12+1 | 0 | 1+0 | 0 | 1+1 | 0 | 0+0 | 0 |
| 4 | DF | (Wales) WAL | James Connolly | 15 | 2 | 12+0 | 2 | 0+0 | 0 | 1+1 | 0 | 1+0 | 0 |
| 5 | DF | (England) ENG | Harrison Burke | 9 | 1 | 1+3 | 1 | 0+0 | 0 | 2+0 | 0 | 3+0 | 0 |
| 6 | MF | (Austria) AUT | Sven Sprangler | 17 | 0 | 10+3 | 0 | 1+0 | 0 | 1+0 | 0 | 1+1 | 0 |
| 7 | FW | (England) ENG | Tai Sodje | 17 | 4 | 7+5 | 2 | 0+1 | 0 | 1+0 | 0 | 2+1 | 2 |
| 8 | MF | (Wales) WAL | Charlie Crew | 18 | 0 | 6+6 | 0 | 1+0 | 0 | 1+1 | 0 | 2+1 | 0 |
| 9 | FW | (Scotland) SCO | Andrew Dallas | 18 | 3 | 5+8 | 1 | 1+0 | 1 | 1+1 | 0 | 2+0 | 1 |
| 10 | MF | (England) ENG | Lewis Simper | 19 | 2 | 7+6 | 1 | 1+0 | 0 | 0+2 | 0 | 1+2 | 1 |
| 11 | FW | (England) ENG | Reece Smith | 17 | 2 | 10+3 | 2 | 0+1 | 0 | 2+0 | 0 | 0+1 | 0 |
| 14 | MF | (England) ENG | Anthony Evans | 3 | 0 | 3+0 | 0 | 0+0 | 0 | 0+0 | 0 | 0+0 | 0 |
| 15 | MF | (England) ENG | Isaac Moore | 18 | 1 | 10+3 | 1 | 0+1 | 0 | 2+0 | 0 | 1+1 | 0 |
| 17 | DF | (Jamaica) JAM | Courtney Clarke | 15 | 1 | 7+4 | 1 | 1+0 | 0 | 1+1 | 0 | 1+0 | 0 |
| 19 | FW | (Scotland) SCO | Aaron Pressley | 17 | 10 | 12+0 | 9 | 1+0 | 0 | 1+1 | 1 | 0+2 | 0 |
| 20 | DF | (England) ENG | Roman Dixon | 3 | 0 | 0+1 | 0 | 0+0 | 0 | 0+0 | 0 | 2+0 | 0 |
| 22 | DF | (England) ENG | Elicha Ahui | 16 | 0 | 9+3 | 0 | 1+0 | 0 | 1+0 | 0 | 1+1 | 0 |
| 25 | DF | (England) ENG | Declan Skura | 15 | 0 | 12+0 | 0 | 1+0 | 0 | 1+1 | 0 | 0+0 | 0 |
| 26 | DF | (Wales) WAL | Ryan Leak | 10 | 0 | 4+2 | 0 | 1+0 | 0 | 1+0 | 0 | 2+0 | 0 |
| 29 | DF | (Republic of Ireland) IRL | James Furlong | 7 | 1 | 1+2 | 0 | 0+0 | 0 | 1+0 | 0 | 3+0 | 1 |
| 30 | DF | (England) ENG | Stan Straw | 1 | 0 | 0+0 | 0 | 0+0 | 0 | 0+0 | 0 | 0+1 | 0 |
| 31 | GK | (England) ENG | Tom Wooster | 3 | 0 | 0+0 | 0 | 0+0 | 0 | 0+0 | 0 | 3+0 | 0 |
| 33 | MF | (England) ENG | Will Etheridge | 3 | 0 | 0+1 | 0 | 0+0 | 0 | 0+0 | 0 | 2+0 | 0 |
| 37 | FW | (Ghana) GHA | Albert Adomah | 9 | 0 | 0+5 | 0 | 0+1 | 0 | 1+0 | 0 | 2+0 | 0 |
| 45 | DF | (England) ENG | Ellis Harris | 2 | 0 | 0+0 | 0 | 0+0 | 0 | 0+0 | 0 | 0+2 | 0 |
| 48 | MF | (England) ENG | Archie Bunn | 1 | 0 | 0+0 | 0 | 0+0 | 0 | 0+0 | 0 | 1+0 | 0 |
| 56 | MF | (England) ENG | Jaden Kandemiri | 1 | 0 | 0+0 | 0 | 0+0 | 0 | 0+0 | 0 | 0+1 | 0 |
| 57 | FW | (England) ENG | Ryan Sjordesma | 4 | 0 | 0+0 | 0 | 0+1 | 0 | 0+0 | 0 | 2+1 | 0 |

=== Disciplinary record ===
As of match played 10 November 2026

Includes all competitive matches. The list is sorted by squad number when disciplinary points / points per card / number of cards are equal. Players with no cards not included in the list.

| Rank | No. | Pos. | Nat. | Name | League Two | | | FA Cup | | | EFL Cup | | | EFL Trophy | | | Total | | |
| Rank | No. | Pos. | Nat. | Name | Yellow card | Second yellow card | Red card | Yellow card | Second yellow card | Red card | Yellow card | Second yellow card | Red card | Yellow card | Second yellow card | Red card | Yellow card | Second yellow card | Red card |
|---|---|---|---|---|---|---|---|---|---|---|---|---|---|---|---|---|---|---|---|
| 1 | 15 | CM | (England) | Isaac Moore | 4 | 0 | 0 | 0 | 0 | 0 | 2 | 0 | 0 | 0 | 0 | 0 | 6 | 0 | 0 |
| 2 | 6 | CM | (Austria) | Sven Sprangler | 4 | 0 | 0 | 0 | 0 | 0 | 1 | 0 | 0 | 0 | 0 | 0 | 5 | 0 | 0 |
| 3 | 22 | RB | (England) | Elicha Ahui | 4 | 0 | 0 | 0 | 0 | 0 | 0 | 0 | 0 | 0 | 0 | 0 | 4 | 0 | 0 |
| 4 | 4 | CB | (Wales) | James Connolly | 3 | 0 | 0 | 0 | 0 | 0 | 0 | 0 | 0 | 0 | 0 | 0 | 3 | 0 | 0 |
| 4 | 8 | CDM | (Wales) | Charlie Crew | 2 | 0 | 0 | 1 | 0 | 0 | 0 | 0 | 0 | 0 | 0 | 0 | 3 | 0 | 0 |
| 6 | 7 | CF | (England) | Tai Sodje | 1 | 0 | 0 | 0 | 0 | 0 | 1 | 0 | 0 | 0 | 0 | 0 | 2 | 0 | 0 |
| 6 | 11 | LW | (England) | Reece Smith | 1 | 0 | 0 | 1 | 0 | 0 | 0 | 0 | 0 | 0 | 0 | 0 | 2 | 0 | 0 |
| 8 | 2 | CB | (Saint Kitts and Nevis) | Rico Browne | 0 | 0 | 0 | 0 | 0 | 0 | 1 | 0 | 0 | 0 | 0 | 0 | 1 | 0 | 0 |
| 8 | 3 | LB | (England) | Mason Hancock | 0 | 0 | 0 | 1 | 0 | 0 | 0 | 0 | 0 | 0 | 0 | 0 | 1 | 0 | 0 |
| 8 | 10 | CM | (England) | Lewis Simper | 0 | 0 | 0 | 0 | 0 | 0 | 1 | 0 | 0 | 0 | 0 | 0 | 1 | 0 | 0 |
| 8 | 25 | CB | (England) | Declan Skura | 1 | 0 | 0 | 0 | 0 | 0 | 0 | 0 | 0 | 0 | 0 | 0 | 1 | 0 | 0 |
| Total | | | | | 20 | 0 | 0 | 3 | 0 | 0 | 6 | 0 | 0 | 0 | 0 | 0 | 29 | 0 | 0 |

== Awards ==
=== EFL awards ===
==== EFL League Two Player of the Month ====
| Month | Player | Result | Ref. |
|---|---|---|---|
| September | (England) Jed Ward | Nominated | |
| October | (Scotland) Aaron Pressley | Nominated | |

==== EFL League Two Manager of the Month ====
| Month | Manager | Result | Ref. |
|---|---|---|---|
| August | (England) Lee Grant | Nominated | |

==== PFA League One Fans' Player of the Month ====
| Month | Player | Result | Ref. |
|---|---|---|---|
| October | (Scotland) Aaron Pressley | Nominated | |
