= List of English football transfers winter 2024–25 =

English football transfer window

The 2024–25 English football winter transfer window ran from 1 January to 3 February 2025. Players without a club could be signed at any time, clubs could sign players on loan dependent on their league's regulations, and clubs could sign a goalkeeper on an emergency loan if they had no registered senior goalkeeper available. This list includes transfers featuring at least one club from either the Premier League or the EFL that were completed after the end of the summer 2024 transfer window on 30 August 2024 and before the end of the 2025 winter window.

== Transfers ==
All players and clubs without a flag are English. While Cardiff City, Swansea City, Wrexham and Newport County are affiliated with the Football Association of Wales and thus take the Welsh flag, they play in the Championship, League One and League Two respectively, and so their transfers are included here.

Date	Player	Moving from	Moving to	Fee
3 September 2024	Kyle Edwards	Unattached	Oxford United	Free
3 September 2024	Ângelo Gabriel	Chelsea	Al-Nassr	£19.1m
3 September 2024	Daniel Podence	Wolverhampton Wanderers	Al-Shabab	£5m
4 September 2024	Joel Thompson	Unattached	Colchester United	Free
6 September 2024	Dan Potts	Unattached	Charlton Athletic	Free
9 September 2024	Steven Alzate	Unattached	Hull City	Free
10 September 2024	Dominic Ball	Unattached	Leyton Orient	Free
10 September 2024	John Egan	Unattached	Burnley	Free
10 September 2024	John Fleck	Unattached	Chesterfield	Free
10 September 2024	Freddie Ladapo	Unattached	Huddersfield Town	Free
10 September 2024	Victor Moses	Unattached	Luton Town	Free
10 September 2024	Fred Onyedinma	Unattached	Wycombe Wanderers	Free
13 September 2024	Marko Maroši	Unattached	Plymouth Argyle	Free
18 September 2024	Danny Hylton	Unattached	Charlton Athletic	Free
19 September 2024	Rico Browne	Unattached	Walsall	Free
20 September 2024	Mustapha Carayol	Unattached	Exeter City	Free
24 September 2024	Aaron Connolly	Unattached	Sunderland	Free
26 September 2024	João Pedro	Unattached	Hull City	Free
27 September 2024	Nesta Guinness-Walker	Unattached	Northampton Town	Free
27 September 2024	Carl Jenkinson	Unattached	Bromley	Free
27 September 2024	Josh Martin	Unattached	Notts County	Free
1 October 2024	Paul Huntington	Unattached	Bradford City	Free
3 October 2024	Josh Onomah	Unattached	Blackpool	Free
4 October 2024	Andre Gray	Unattached	Plymouth Argyle	Free
4 October 2024	Scott Hogan	Unattached	Milton Keynes Dons	Free
4 October 2024	Emiliano Marcondes	Unattached	Norwich City	Free
4 October 2024	Liam Shaw	Unattached	Fleetwood Town	Free
6 October 2024	Corry Evans	Unattached	Bradford City	Free
19 October 2024	Tyler Burey	Unattached	Carlisle United	Free
22 October 2024	Charlie Kirk	Unattached	Barrow	Free
23 October 2024	Josuha Guilavogui	Unattached	Leeds United	Free
25 October 2024	Jón Daði Böðvarsson	Unattached	Wrexham	Free
25 October 2024	Matty James	Unattached	Wrexham	Free
1 November 2024	Timothy Eyoma	Unattached	Northampton Town	Free
1 November 2024	Rekeem Harper	Unattached	Port Vale	Free
1 November 2024	Martyn Waghorn	Unattached	Northampton Town	Free
8 November 2024	Paul Dummett	Unattached	Wigan Athletic	Free
9 November 2024	Kadeem Harris	Unattached	Carlisle United	Free
12 November 2024	Eno Nto	Unattached	Harrogate Town	Free
13 November 2024	Kevin McDonald	Unattached	Exeter City	Free
2 December 2024	Admiral Muskwe	Unattached	Harrogate Town	Free
5 December 2024	Romaine Sawyers	Unattached	AFC Wimbledon	Free
10 December 2024	Sam Hutchinson	Unattached	AFC Wimbledon	Free
19 December 2024	Erik Pieters	Unattached	Luton Town	Free
21 December 2024	Jamal Blackman	Unattached	Shrewsbury Town	Free
1 January 2025	Benoný Breki Andrésson	KR	Stockport County	Undisclosed
1 January 2025	Diego Gómez	Inter Miami	Brighton & Hove Albion	Undisclosed
1 January 2025	George Lapslie	Gillingham	Bradford City	Free
1 January 2025	Gustav Lindgren	Degerfors IF	Peterborough United	£500,000
1 January 2025	Christ Makosso	RWDM	Luton Town	Undisclosed
1 January 2025	Bryn Morris	Newport County	Harrogate Town	Undisclosed
1 January 2025	Will Patching	Derry City	Carlisle United	Free
1 January 2025	Darragh Power	Waterford	Cheltenham Town	Undisclosed
1 January 2025	Josh Robinson	Arsenal	Wigan Athletic	Free
1 January 2025	Ruben Roosken	Heracles Almelo	Huddersfield Town	Undisclosed
1 January 2025	Oliver Sonne	Silkeborg	Burnley	Undisclosed
1 January 2025	Welington	São Paulo	Southampton	Free
1 January 2025	Yang Min-hyeok	Gangwon FC	Tottenham Hotspur	Undisclosed
2 January 2025	Ashley Barnes	Norwich City	Burnley	Free
2 January 2025	Elliot Embleton	Blackpool	Carlisle United	Free
2 January 2025	Isaac Fletcher	Spennymoor Town	Barrow	Undisclosed
2 January 2025	Jaheim Headley	Huddersfield Town	Port Vale	Undisclosed
2 January 2025	Lewis Webb	Unattached	Newport County	Free
3 January 2025	Matai Akinmboni	D.C. United	Bournemouth	£810,000
3 January 2025	Michael Baidoo	IF Elfsborg	Plymouth Argyle	Undisclosed
3 January 2025	Charlie Brown	Morecambe	Accrington Stanley	Undisclosed
3 January 2025	Ismaila Coulibaly	Sheffield United	LASK	Undisclosed
3 January 2025	Neil Farrugia	Shamrock Rovers	Barnsley	Free
3 January 2025	Lewis Gibson	Plymouth Argyle	Preston North End	Undisclosed
3 January 2025	Joseph Hungbo	1. FC Nürnberg	Wigan Athletic	Undisclosed
3 January 2025	Ben Radcliffe	Derby County	Crawley Town	Undisclosed
3 January 2025	Liam Shaw	Fleetwood Town	Northampton Town	Undisclosed
3 January 2025	Callum Whelan	Gateshead	Carlisle United	Undisclosed
4 January 2025	Carl Johnston	Fleetwood Town	Peterborough United	Undisclosed
4 January 2025	Shaun Rooney	Unattached	Fleetwood Town	Free
5 January 2025	Antonín Kinský	Slavia Prague	Tottenham Hotspur	£12.5m
5 January 2025	Ole Romeny	Utrecht	Oxford United	Undisclosed
6 January 2025	Kai Crampton	Chelsea	Bournemouth	Undisclosed
6 January 2025	Will Jarvis	Hull City	Notts County	Undisclosed
6 January 2025	Marcelo Pitaluga	Liverpool	Fluminense	Free
6 January 2025	Cedwyn Scott	Notts County	Carlisle United	Undisclosed
7 January 2025	Kian Harratt	Huddersfield Town	Fleetwood Town	Undisclosed
7 January 2025	Julio Soler	Lanús	Bournemouth	Undisclosed
8 January 2025	Romaine Sawyers	AFC Wimbledon	Bristol Rovers	Free
9 January 2025	Emmanuel Agbadou	Reims	Wolverhampton Wanderers	£16.6m
9 January 2025	Anders Hagelskjær	Molde	Wycombe Wanderers	Undisclosed
9 January 2025	Joachim Kayi Sanda	Valenciennes	Southampton	Undisclosed
9 January 2025	Joel Randall	Peterborough United	Bolton Wanderers	Undisclosed
9 January 2025	Elias Sørensen	Portsmouth	Vålerenga	Undisclosed
9 January 2025	Ben Thompson	Stevenage	Bromley	Undisclosed
9 January 2025	Jay Williams	Crawley Town	Milton Keynes Dons	Undisclosed
10 January 2025	Matt Crooks	Real Salt Lake	Hull City	Undisclosed
10 January 2025	Paul Dummett	Wigan Athletic	Carlisle United	Free
10 January 2025	Isaiah Jones	Middlesbrough	Luton Town	Undisclosed
10 January 2025	Nicke Kabamba	Barnet	Bromley	Undisclosed
10 January 2025	Tommy Leigh	Milton Keynes Dons	Bradford City	Undisclosed
10 January 2025	Joe Taylor	Luton Town	Huddersfield Town	Undisclosed
10 January 2025	Rhys Walters	Unattached	Port Vale	Free
11 January 2025	Adam Forshaw	Plymouth Argyle	Blackburn Rovers	Free
11 January 2025	Jon Mellish	Carlisle United	Wigan Athletic	Undisclosed
11 January 2025	Christ Tiéhi	Rotherham United	Diósgyőr	Undisclosed
12 January 2025	Janoi Donacien	Unattached	Chesterfield	Free
13 January 2025	Anis Ben Slimane	Sheffield United	Norwich City	Undisclosed
13 January 2025	Stephen Wearne	Milton Keynes Dons	Carlisle United	Undisclosed
13 January 2025	Charlie Whitaker	Everton	Notts County	Free
14 January 2025	Tom Bloxham	Shrewsbury Town	Blackpool	Undisclosed
14 January 2025	Marcus Browne	Unattached	AFC Wimbledon	Free
14 January 2025	Brooklyn Ilunga	Milton Keynes Dons	Bromley	Free
14 January 2025	Donyell Malen	Borussia Dortmund	Aston Villa	£21.5m
14 January 2025	Marko Maroši	Plymouth Argyle	Cambridge United	Free
14 January 2025	Ryan Schofield	Unattached	Morecambe	Free
15 January 2025	Elicha Ahui	Drogheda United	Walsall	Undisclosed
15 January 2025	Dion Charles	Bolton Wanderers	Huddersfield Town	Undisclosed
15 January 2025	Callum Cooke	Unattached	Morecambe	Free
15 January 2025	Woyo Coulibaly	Parma	Leicester City	£3m
15 January 2025	Daniel Crowley	Notts County	Milton Keynes Dons	Undisclosed
15 January 2025	Christian Fassnacht	Norwich City	Young Boys	Free
15 January 2025	Jaden Philogene	Aston Villa	Ipswich Town	£20m
15 January 2025	Lars-Jørgen Salvesen	Viking	Derby County	Undisclosed
15 January 2025	Callum Stewart	Leamington	Shrewsbury Town	Undisclosed
16 January 2025	Jón Daði Böðvarsson	Wrexham	Burton Albion	Free
16 January 2025	Tom Bradshaw	Millwall	Oxford United	Undisclosed
16 January 2025	Charlie Caton	Chester	Accrington Stanley	Undisclosed
16 January 2025	Aaron Connolly	Sunderland	Millwall	Undisclosed
16 January 2025	Tayo Edun	Charlton Athletic	Peterborough United	Free
16 January 2025	Matěj Jurásek	Slavia Prague	Norwich City	Undisclosed
16 January 2025	Harrison Neal	Carlisle United	Fleetwood Town	Undisclosed
16 January 2025	Magnus Westergaard	Viborg	Wycombe Wanderers	Undisclosed
17 January 2025	Nordin Amrabat	AEK Athens	Hull City	Free
17 January 2025	Sam Clucas	Oldham Athletic	Lincoln City	Free
17 January 2025	Tristan Crama	Brentford	Millwall	Undisclosed
17 January 2025	Tom Davies	Cardiff City	Newport County	Free
17 January 2025	Grant Hanley	Norwich City	Birmingham City	Free
17 January 2025	Michał Helik	Huddersfield Town	Oxford United	Undisclosed
17 January 2025	Nelson Khumbeni	Bolton Wanderers	Gillingham	Undisclosed
17 January 2025	Rosaire Longelo	Swindon Town	Salford City	Undisclosed
17 January 2025	Yousef Salech	IK Sirius	Cardiff City	Undisclosed
17 January 2025	Zain Silcott-Duberry	Chelsea	Bournemouth	Undisclosed
18 January 2025	Romain Esse	Millwall	Crystal Palace	£12m
20 January 2025	James Collins	Derby County	Lincoln City	Free
20 January 2025	Dominic Gape	Eastleigh	Shrewsbury Town	Undisclosed
20 January 2025	Kyle Joseph	Blackpool	Hull City	Undisclosed
20 January 2025	Abdukodir Khusanov	Lens	Manchester City	£33.6m
20 January 2025	Jakub Moder	Brighton & Hove Albion	Feyenoord	Undisclosed
20 January 2025	Jonjo Shelvey	Eyüpspor	Burnley	Free
20 January 2025	Benn Ward	Burnley	Accrington Stanley	Undisclosed
21 January 2025	Tom Cursons	Ilkeston Town	Harrogate Town	Undisclosed
21 January 2025	Andrés García	Levante	Aston Villa	£6m
21 January 2025	Vitor Reis	Palmeiras	Manchester City	£29.6m
21 January 2025	Josh Williams	Birmingham City	Carlisle United	Undisclosed
22 January 2025	Azeem Abdulai	Swansea City	Leyton Orient	Undisclosed
22 January 2025	James Berry	Chesterfield	Wycombe Wanderers	Undisclosed
22 January 2025	Ricardo Dinanga	AFC Telford United	Shrewsbury Town	Undisclosed
22 January 2025	Thomas Hill	Liverpool	Harrogate Town	Undisclosed
22 January 2025	Josh Martin	Notts County	Newport County	Free
22 January 2025	Isaac Price	Standard Liège	West Bromwich Albion	Undisclosed
22 January 2025	Thomas Waddingham	Brisbane Roar	Portsmouth	Undisclosed
23 January 2025	Tom Cannon	Leicester City	Sheffield United	£10m
23 January 2025	Diego Carlos	Aston Villa	Fenerbahçe	£8.45m
23 January 2025	Omar Marmoush	Eintracht Frankfurt	Manchester City	£59m
23 January 2025	MJ Williams	Milton Keynes Dons	Barrow	Undisclosed
24 January 2025	Ryan Longman	Hull City	Wrexham	Undisclosed
24 January 2025	Eliot Matazo	Monaco	Hull City	Undisclosed
24 January 2025	Nathan Thompson	Stevenage	Milton Keynes Dons	Undisclosed
24 January 2025	Morgan Whittaker	Plymouth Argyle	Middlesbrough	£6m
25 January 2025	George Edmundson	Ipswich Town	Middlesbrough	Undisclosed
26 January 2025	Darragh Burns	Milton Keynes Dons	Grimsby Town	Undisclosed
27 January 2025	Hayden Matthews	Sydney FC	Portsmouth	£1.26m
28 January 2025	Thelo Aasgaard	Wigan Athletic	Luton Town	Undisclosed
28 January 2025	Matthew Clarke	Middlesbrough	Derby County	Undisclosed
28 January 2025	Rory Feely	Barrow	Crawley Town	Undisclosed
30 January 2025	Millenic Alli	Exeter City	Luton Town	£1.5m
30 January 2025	Miguel Almirón	Newcastle United	Atlanta United	£8m
30 January 2025	Ronan Darcy	Crawley Town	Wigan Athletic	Undisclosed
30 January 2025	Osman Foyo	Ipswich Town	AFC Wimbledon	Undisclosed
30 January 2025	Ajay Matthews	Middlesbrough	Millwall	Undisclosed
31 January 2025	Levi Amantchi	Bromley	Walsall	Undisclosed
31 January 2025	Stuart Armstrong	Vancouver Whitecaps	Sheffield Wednesday	Undisclosed
31 January 2025	Eiran Cashin	Derby County	Brighton & Hove Albion	£9m
31 January 2025	Cohen Bramall	Rotherham United	Portsmouth	Undisclosed
31 January 2025	Luke Cundle	Wolverhampton Wanderers	Millwall	Undisclosed
31 January 2025	Josh Dede	Celtic	Middlesbrough	Free
31 January 2025	Jhon Durán	Aston Villa	Al-Nassr	£71m
31 January 2025	Matt Grimes	Swansea City	Coventry City	Undisclosed
31 January 2025	James Jones	Wrexham	Burton Albion	Undisclosed
31 January 2025	Augustus Kargbo	Cesena	Blackburn Rovers	Undisclosed
31 January 2025	Devon Matthews	Curzon Ashton	Accrington Stanley	Undisclosed
31 January 2025	Stanley Mills	Everton	Oxford United	Undisclosed
31 January 2025	Camiel Neghli	Sparta Rotterdam	Millwall	Undisclosed
31 January 2025	Sonny Perkins	Leeds United	Leyton Orient	Undisclosed
31 January 2025	Jack Sanders	St Johnstone	Milton Keynes Dons	Undisclosed
31 January 2025	Egil Selvik	Udinese	Watford	Undisclosed
31 January 2025	Manolis Siopis	Cardiff City	Panathinaikos	Undisclosed
31 January 2025	Sam Smith	Reading	Wrexham	Undisclosed
31 January 2025	Ben Stevenson	Unattached	Cambridge United	Free
31 January 2025	Maksym Talovyerov	LASK	Plymouth Argyle	Undisclosed
31 January 2025	Géza Dávid Turi	Víkingur	Grimsby Town	Undisclosed
31 January 2025	Jaden Warner	Norwich City	Newport County	Free
31 January 2025	Melker Widell	Aalborg BK	Swansea City	Undisclosed
1 February 2025	Ayden Heaven	Arsenal	Manchester United	Undisclosed
1 February 2025	Wilson Isidor	Zenit Saint Petersburg	Sunderland	Undisclosed
1 February 2025	Sondre Langås	Viking	Derby County	Undisclosed
2 February 2025	Cesare Casadei	Chelsea	Torino	£12.5m
2 February 2025	Patrick Dorgu	Lecce	Manchester United	£25m
3 February 2025	Travis Akomeah	Chelsea	Watford	Undisclosed
3 February 2025	Mathis Amougou	Saint-Étienne	Chelsea	£12.5m
3 February 2025	Fin Back	Nottingham Forest	Wycombe Wanderers	Undisclosed
3 February 2025	Tommy Backwell	Bristol City	Cheltenham Town	Undisclosed
3 February 2025	Jaydon Banel	Ajax	Burnley	Undisclosed
3 February 2025	Tammer Bany	Randers	West Bromwich Albion	£3.3m
3 February 2025	Benicio Baker-Boaitey	Brighton & Hove Albion	Millwall	Undisclosed
3 February 2025	Malachi Boateng	Heart of Midlothian	Plymouth Argyle	Undisclosed
3 February 2025	Somto Boniface	Chelsea	Ipswich Town	Undisclosed
3 February 2025	Tyler Bindon	Reading	Nottingham Forest	Undisclosed
3 February 2025	Jefferson Cáceres	Melgar	Sheffield United	Undisclosed
3 February 2025	Romoney Crichlow	Peterborough United	Bradford City	Undisclosed
3 February 2025	Ruben Curley	Manchester United	Stoke City	Undisclosed
3 February 2025	Nasser Djiga	Red Star Belgrade	Wolverhampton Wanderers	Undisclosed
3 February 2025	Rarmani Edmonds-Green	Charlton Athletic	Leyton Orient	Free
3 February 2025	Kyle Edwards	Oxford United	Stevenage	Free
3 February 2025	John Egan	Burnley	Hull City	Undisclosed
3 February 2025	Ben Fox	Northampton Town	Harrogate Town	Undisclosed
3 February 2025	Liam Fraser	Unattached	Crawley Town	Free
3 February 2025	Nico González	Porto	Manchester City	£50m
3 February 2025	Joe Hilton	Blackburn Rovers	Bradford City	Undisclosed
3 February 2025	Marcus Ifill	Brighton & Hove Albion	Bromley	Undisclosed
3 February 2025	Ben Killip	Barnsley	Portsmouth	Undisclosed
3 February 2025	Eli Junior Kroupi	Lorient	Bournemouth	Undisclosed
3 February 2025	Lee Myung-jae	Unattached	Birmingham City	Free
3 February 2025	Kyreece Lisbie	Brentford	Colchester United	Undisclosed
3 February 2025	Zak Lovelace	Rangers	Millwall	Undisclosed
3 February 2025	Angus MacDonald	Aberdeen	Exeter City	Free
3 February 2025	Ruairi McConville	Brighton & Hove Albion	Norwich City	Undisclosed
3 February 2025	Owen Moxon	Portsmouth	Stockport County	Undisclosed
3 February 2025	Marshall Munetsi	Reims	Wolverhampton Wanderers	Undisclosed
3 February 2025	Lasse Nordås	Tromsø	Luton Town	Undisclosed
3 February 2025	Will Norris	Portsmouth	Wycombe Wanderers	Undisclosed
3 February 2025	Christian Nwachukwu	Botev Plovdiv	Sheffield United	Undisclosed
3 February 2025	Andrew Oluwabori	FC Halifax Town	Exeter City	Undisclosed
3 February 2025	Alex Palmer	West Bromwich Albion	Ipswich Town	£5m
3 February 2025	Adam Reach	Unattached	Wycombe Wanderers	Free
3 February 2025	Yuri Ribeiro	Braga	Blackburn Rovers	Undisclosed
3 February 2025	Connor Ripley	Port Vale	Swindon Town	Undisclosed
3 February 2025	Reiss-Alexander Russell-Denny	Chelsea	Tottenham Hotspur	Undisclosed
3 February 2025	Maï Traoré	Fredrikstad	Notts County	Undisclosed
3 February 2025	Connal Trueman	Millwall	Milton Keynes Dons	Undisclosed
3 February 2025	Ed Turns	Brighton & Hove Albion	Exeter City	Undisclosed
3 February 2025	Stefanos Tzimas	1. FC Nürnberg	Brighton & Hove Albion	£20.8m
3 February 2025	Harvey Vale	Chelsea	Queens Park Rangers	Undisclosed
3 February 2025	Kane Vincent-Young	Unattached	Colchester United	Free
3 February 2025	Randell Williams	Bolton Wanderers	Leyton Orient	Undisclosed

== Loans ==
Start date	End date	Player	Moving from	Moving to
31 August 2024	31 May 2025	Leander Dendoncker	Aston Villa	Anderlecht
31 August 2024	31 May 2025	Kurt Zouma	West Ham United	Al-Orobah
3 September 2024	30 June 2025	Jamal Lewis	Newcastle United	São Paulo
3 September 2024	31 May 2025	Mileta Rajović	Watford	Brøndby
4 September 2024	31 May 2025	Samuel Edozie	Southampton	Anderlecht
6 September 2024	31 May 2025	Nikola Jojić	Stoke City	Mladost Lucani
9 September 2024	31 May 2025	Ivo Grbić	Sheffield United	Çaykur Rizespor
13 September 2024	31 May 2025	David Datro Fofana	Chelsea	Göztepe
1 October 2024	8 October 2024	Jackson Smith	Barnsley	Grimsby Town
7 October 2024	14 October 2024	Connal Trueman	Millwall	Crawley Town
1 January 2025	31 May 2025	Ronnie Edwards	Southampton	Queens Park Rangers
1 January 2025	31 May 2025	Ashley Hay	Brentford	Cheltenham Town
3 January 2025	31 May 2025	Robert Atkinson	Bristol City	Portsmouth
3 January 2025	31 May 2025	Kyle Cameron	Notts County	Barrow
3 January 2025	31 May 2025	Lewis Dobbin	Aston Villa	Norwich City
3 January 2025	31 May 2025	Brandon Khela	Birmingham City	Bradford City
3 January 2025	31 May 2025	Marvin Mehlem	Hull City	SC Paderborn
3 January 2025	31 May 2025	Layton Stewart	Preston North End	Thun
3 January 2025	31 May 2025	Rob Street	Lincoln City	Doncaster Rovers
5 January 2025	31 May 2025	Ben Godfrey	Atalanta	Ipswich Town
5 January 2025	31 May 2025	Will Goodwin	Oxford United	Wigan Athletic
6 January 2025	31 May 2025	Sonny Bradley	Derby County	Wycombe Wanderers
6 January 2025	31 May 2025	Issa Kaboré	Manchester City	Werder Bremen
7 January 2025	31 May 2025	Sean Fusire	Sheffield Wednesday	Carlisle United
7 January 2025	31 May 2025	Andréas Hountondji	Burnley	Standard Liège
7 January 2025	31 May 2025	Han-Noah Massengo	Burnley	Auxerre
7 January 2025	31 May 2025	Eko Solomon	Huddersfield Town	Harrogate Town
8 January 2025	31 May 2025	Valentino Adedokun	Brentford	Cheltenham Town
8 January 2025	31 May 2025	Michael Mellon	Burnley	Bradford City
9 January 2025	31 May 2025	Matthew Craig	Tottenham Hotspur	Mansfield Town
9 January 2025	31 May 2025	Owen Dodgson	Burnley	Burton Albion
9 January 2025	31 May 2025	Leo Duru	Blackburn Rovers	Barrow
9 January 2025	31 December 2025	Marquinhos	Arsenal	Cruzeiro
9 January 2025	31 May 2025	Aaron Pressley	Stevenage	Barrow
9 January 2025	31 May 2025	Tymoteusz Puchacz	Holstein Kiel	Plymouth Argyle
10 January 2025	31 May 2025	Asher Agbinone	Crystal Palace	Gillingham
10 January 2025	31 May 2025	Nathan Asiimwe	Charlton Athletic	Walsall
10 January 2025	31 May 2025	Chem Campbell	Wolverhampton Wanderers	Reading
10 January 2025	31 May 2025	Ethan Ennis	Manchester United	Doncaster Rovers
10 January 2025	31 May 2025	Isaac Hayden	Newcastle United	Portsmouth
10 January 2025	31 May 2025	Enzo Le Fée	Roma	Sunderland
10 January 2025	31 May 2025	Alex Matos	Chelsea	Oxford United
10 January 2025	31 May 2025	JJ McKiernan	Lincoln City	Burton Albion
10 January 2025	31 May 2025	Tom Nichols	Mansfield Town	Swindon Town
10 January 2025	31 May 2025	Dion Sanderson	Birmingham City	Blackburn Rovers
10 January 2025	31 May 2025	Jemiah Umolu	Crystal Palace	Port Vale
11 January 2025	31 May 2025	Archie Mair	Norwich City	Motherwell
12 January 2025	31 May 2025	Philip Billing	Bournemouth	Napoli
12 January 2025	31 May 2025	Joel Colwill	Cardiff City	Exeter City
12 January 2025	31 May 2025	Aribim Pepple	Luton Town	Chesterfield
13 January 2025	31 May 2025	Max Aarons	Bournemouth	Valencia
13 January 2025	31 May 2025	Alfie Dorrington	Tottenham Hotspur	Aberdeen
13 January 2025	31 May 2025	Zak Johnson	Sunderland	Notts County
13 January 2025	31 May 2025	Calvin Ramsay	Liverpool	Kilmarnock
13 January 2025	31 May 2025	Samuel Silvera	Middlesbrough	Blackpool
15 January 2025	31 May 2025	Elicha Ahui	Walsall	Drogheda United
15 January 2025	31 May 2025	Bryant Bilongo	Bristol Rovers	Harrogate Town
15 January 2025	31 May 2025	Charlie Crew	Leeds United	Doncaster Rovers
15 January 2025	31 May 2025	Joe Gelhardt	Leeds United	Hull City
16 January 2025	31 May 2025	James Abankwah	Udinese	Watford
16 January 2025	31 May 2025	David Ajiboye	Peterborough United	Newport County
16 January 2025	31 May 2025	Zac Ashworth	Blackpool	Ross County
16 January 2025	31 May 2025	Tommy Backwell	Bristol City	Cheltenham Town
16 January 2025	31 May 2025	Sam Hughes	Stockport County	Peterborough United
16 January 2025	31 May 2025	Dilan Markanday	Blackburn Rovers	Leyton Orient
16 January 2025	31 May 2025	Charlie McArthur	Newcastle United	Carlisle United
16 January 2025	31 May 2025	Jayden Meghoma	Brentford	Preston North End
16 January 2025	31 May 2025	Tommi O'Reilly	Aston Villa	Milton Keynes Dons
16 January 2025	31 May 2025	Olly Sanderson	Fulham	Harrogate Town
16 January 2025	31 May 2025	Jonathan Tomkinson	Norwich City	Ross County
17 January 2025	31 May 2025	Joe Hugill	Manchester United	Carlisle United
17 January 2025	31 May 2025	Max Merrick	Chelsea	Hampton & Richmond Borough
17 January 2025	31 May 2025	Oliver Norburn	Blackpool	Wigan Athletic
17 January 2025	31 May 2025	Tyler Smith	Bradford City	Barrow
17 January 2025	31 May 2025	Ethan Williams	Manchester United	Cheltenham Town
20 January 2025	31 May 2025	Maxwel Cornet	West Ham United	Genoa
20 January 2025	31 May 2025	Ben Brereton Díaz	Southampton	Sheffield United
20 January 2025	31 May 2025	Alex Murphy	Newcastle United	Bolton Wanderers
20 January 2025	31 May 2025	Connor O'Riordan	Blackburn Rovers	Crewe Alexandra
20 January 2025	31 May 2025	Ruari Paton	Port Vale	Dundee United
20 January 2025	31 May 2025	Tyreece Simpson	Stevenage	Colchester United
20 January 2025	31 May 2025	Jack Sparkes	Peterborough United	Chesterfield
21 January 2025	31 May 2025	Albert Grønbæk	Rennes	Southampton
21 January 2025	31 May 2025	Harvey Lintott	Northampton Town	Sligo Rovers
22 January 2025	31 May 2025	Terry Taylor	Charlton Athletic	Northampton Town
22 January 2025	31 May 2025	Antonio Tikvić	Watford	Grazer AK
22 January 2025	31 May 2025	Josh Wilson-Esbrand	Manchester City	Stoke City
23 January 2025	31 May 2025	Hjalmar Ekdal	Burnley	Groningen
23 January 2025	31 May 2025	Julio Enciso	Brighton & Hove Albion	Ipswich Town
23 January 2025	31 May 2025	Ryan Giles	Hull City	Middlesbrough
23 January 2025	31 May 2025	Micah Hamilton	Middlesbrough	Stockport County
23 January 2025	31 May 2025	Lincoln	Fenerbahçe	Hull City
23 January 2025	31 May 2025	Jack Tucker	Milton Keynes Dons	Colchester United
23 January 2025	31 May 2025	Joe Westley	Burnley	Swindon Town
23 January 2025	31 May 2025	Tony Yogane	Brentford	Exeter City
24 January 2025	31 May 2025	Ali Al-Hamadi	Ipswich Town	Stoke City
24 January 2025	31 May 2025	Hannes Delcroix	Burnley	Swansea City
24 January 2025	31 May 2025	Michael Kayode	Fiorentina	Brentford
24 January 2025	31 May 2025	Jimmy-Jay Morgan	Chelsea	Gillingham
24 January 2025	31 May 2025	Louie Sibley	Oxford United	Rotherham United
24 January 2025	31 May 2025	Ryan Tafazolli	Wycombe Wanderers	Lee Man
24 January 2025	31 May 2025	Kyle Walker	Manchester City	Milan
25 January 2025	31 May 2025	Antony	Manchester United	Real Betis
25 January 2025	31 May 2025	Ethan Wheatley	Manchester United	Walsall
26 January 2025	31 May 2025	Fally Mayulu	Bristol City	Sturm Graz
27 January 2025	31 May 2025	Hamza Choudhury	Leicester City	Sheffield United
27 January 2025	31 May 2025	Kieran Dowell	Rangers	Birmingham City
27 January 2025	31 May 2025	Kamari Doyle	Brighton & Hove Albion	Crawley Town
27 January 2025	31 May 2025	Dylan Duffy	Lincoln City	Chesterfield
27 January 2025	31 May 2025	Esapa Osong	Nottingham Forest	Cambridge United
27 January 2025	31 May 2025	Mads Roerslev	Brentford	VfL Wolfsburg
27 January 2025	31 May 2025	Renato Veiga	Chelsea	Juventus
28 January 2025	31 May 2025	Matthew Cox	Brentford	Crawley Town
28 January 2025	31 May 2025	Sivert Mannsverk	Ajax	Cardiff City
28 January 2025	31 May 2025	Kal Naismith	Bristol City	Luton Town
29 January 2025	31 May 2025	Louie Barry	Aston Villa	Hull City
29 January 2025	31 May 2025	Emiliano Buendía	Aston Villa	Bayer Leverkusen
29 January 2025	31 May 2025	Harry Clarke	Ipswich Town	Sheffield United
29 January 2025	31 May 2025	Caleb Taylor	West Bromwich Albion	Wycombe Wanderers
29 January 2025	31 May 2025	Mark Travers	Bournemouth	Middlesbrough
29 January 2025	31 May 2025	Yang Min-hyeok	Tottenham Hotspur	Queens Park Rangers
30 January 2025	31 May 2025	Matt Butcher	Wycombe Wanderers	Bristol Rovers
30 January 2025	31 May 2025	Niall Ennis	Stoke City	Blackpool
30 January 2025	31 May 2025	Joe Gauci	Aston Villa	Barnsley
30 January 2025	31 May 2025	Alex Hartridge	Wycombe Wanderers	Exeter City
30 January 2025	31 May 2025	Tom Lowery	Portsmouth	Crewe Alexandra
31 January 2025	31 May 2025	Joe Bevan	Burnley	Carlisle United
31 January 2025	31 May 2025	Josh Bowler	Nottingham Forest	Luton Town
31 January 2025	31 May 2025	Brandon Cover	Leicester City	Fleetwood Town
31 January 2025	31 May 2025	Andrew Dallas	Barnsley	Morecambe
31 January 2025	31 May 2025	Kion Etete	Cardiff City	Bolton Wanderers
31 January 2025	31 May 2025	Michael Forbes	West Ham United	Colchester United
31 January 2025	31 May 2025	Joe Gardner	Nottingham Forest	Lincoln City
31 January 2025	31 May 2025	Jake Garrett	Blackburn Rovers	Tranmere Rovers
31 January 2025	31 May 2025	Dan Gore	Manchester United	Rotherham United
31 January 2025	31 May 2025	Brandon Hanlan	Wycombe Wanderers	Stevenage
31 January 2025	31 May 2025	Nikola Katić	Zürich	Plymouth Argyle
31 January 2025	31 May 2025	Will Lankshear	Tottenham Hotspur	West Bromwich Albion
31 January 2025	31 May 2025	Charlie Lutz	Aston Villa	Kidderminster Harriers
31 January 2025	31 May 2025	Adam Mayor	Millwall	Bromley
31 January 2025	31 May 2025	Kobei Moore	Aston Villa	Fleetwood Town
31 January 2025	31 May 2025	Michael Olakigbe	Brentford	Chesterfield
31 January 2025	31 May 2025	Fábio Tavares	Coventry City	Burton Albion
31 January 2025	31 May 2025	Melker Widell	Swansea City	Aalborg BK
1 February 2025	31 May 2025	Ibrahim Cissoko	Toulouse	Sheffield Wednesday
2 February 2025	31 May 2025	Valentín Barco	Brighton & Hove Albion	Strasbourg
2 February 2025	31 May 2025	Kevin Danso	Lens	Tottenham Hotspur
2 February 2025	31 May 2025	Marcus Rashford	Manchester United	Aston Villa
3 February 2025	31 May 2025	Ken Aboh	Norwich City	Colchester United
3 February 2025	31 May 2025	Tayo Adaramola	Crystal Palace	Bradford City
3 February 2025	31 May 2025	Carlos Alcaraz	Flamengo	Everton
3 February 2025	31 May 2025	Will Alves	Leicester City	Cardiff City
3 February 2025	31 May 2025	Adam Armstrong	Southampton	West Bromwich Albion
3 February 2025	31 May 2025	Harrison Armstrong	Everton	Derby County
3 February 2025	31 May 2025	Marco Asensio	Paris Saint-Germain	Aston Villa
3 February 2025	31 May 2025	Finn Ashworth	Wolverhampton Wanderers	Port Vale
3 February 2025	31 May 2025	Abdoullah Ba	Sunderland	Dunkerque
3 February 2025	31 May 2025	Gavin Bazunu	Southampton	Standard Liège
3 February 2025	31 May 2025	Tyler Bindon	Nottingham Forest	Reading
3 February 2025	31 May 2025	Nathan Bishop	Sunderland	Cambridge United
3 February 2025	31 May 2025	Billy Bodin	Burton Albion	Reading
3 February 2025	31 May 2025	Alfie Chang	Birmingham City	Walsall
3 February 2025	31 May 2025	Ben Chilwell	Chelsea	Crystal Palace
3 February 2025	31 May 2025	Tawanda Chirewa	Wolverhampton Wanderers	Huddersfield Town
3 February 2025	31 May 2025	Carney Chukwuemeka	Chelsea	Borussia Dortmund
3 February 2025	31 May 2025	Dominic Corness	Liverpool	Gillingham
3 February 2025	31 May 2025	Sam Cosgrove	Barnsley	Stockport County
3 February 2025	31 May 2025	Dara Costelloe	Burnley	Northampton Town
3 February 2025	31 May 2025	Owen Dale	Oxford United	Wigan Athletic
3 February 2025	31 May 2025	Jayden Danns	Liverpool	Sunderland
3 February 2025	31 May 2025	Emmanuel Dennis	Nottingham Forest	Blackburn Rovers
3 February 2025	31 May 2025	Timothée Dieng	Gillingham	Cheltenham Town
3 February 2025	31 May 2025	Axel Disasi	Chelsea	Aston Villa
3 February 2025	31 May 2025	Stephen Duke-McKenna	Harrogate Town	St Johnstone
3 February 2025	31 May 2025	Marcus Edwards	Sporting CP	Burnley
3 February 2025	31 May 2025	João Félix	Chelsea	Milan
3 February 2025	31 May 2025	Evan Ferguson	Brighton & Hove Albion	West Ham United
3 February 2025	31 May 2025	Gerard Garner	Barrow	Morecambe
3 February 2025	31 May 2025	Alex Gilbert	Middlesbrough	Charlton Athletic
3 February 2025	31 May 2025	Kaide Gordon	Liverpool	Portsmouth
3 February 2025	31 May 2025	Ellis Harrison	Milton Keynes Dons	Walsall
3 February 2025	31 May 2025	Brad Hills	Norwich City	Stockport County
3 February 2025	31 May 2025	Rob Holding	Crystal Palace	Sheffield United
3 February 2025	31 May 2025	Tom Holmes	Luton Town	Dender
3 February 2025	31 May 2025	Kelechi Iheanacho	Sevilla	Middlesbrough
3 February 2025	31 May 2025	Samuel Iling-Junior	Aston Villa	Middlesbrough
3 February 2025	31 May 2025	Louis Jackson	Manchester United	Tranmere Rovers
3 February 2025	31 May 2025	Maldini Kacurri	Arsenal	Bromley
3 February 2025	31 May 2025	Lloyd Kelly	Newcastle United	Juventus
3 February 2025	31 May 2025	Dexter Lembikisa	Wolverhampton Wanderers	Barnsley
3 February 2025	31 May 2025	Darius Lipsiuc	Stoke City	Walsall
3 February 2025	31 May 2025	Kyran Lofthouse	Barnsley	Burton Albion
3 February 2025	31 May 2025	Eli Junior Kroupi	Bournemouth	Lorient
3 February 2025	31 May 2025	Louie Marsh	Sheffield United	Fleetwood Town
3 February 2025	31 May 2025	Sam Mather	Manchester United	Tranmere Rovers
3 February 2025	31 May 2025	Tom McIntyre	Portsmouth	Charlton Athletic
3 February 2025	31 May 2025	Pelly Ruddock Mpanzu	Luton Town	Rotherham United
3 February 2025	31 May 2025	Kosta Nedeljković	Aston Villa	RB Leipzig
3 February 2025	31 May 2025	Lewis O'Brien	Nottingham Forest	Swansea City
3 February 2025	31 May 2025	Joe O'Brien-Whitmarsh	Southampton	Accrington Stanley
3 February 2025	31 May 2025	Vadaine Oliver	Bradford City	Shrewsbury Town
3 February 2025	31 May 2025	Danilo Orsi	Burton Albion	Milton Keynes Dons
3 February 2025	31 May 2025	Travis Patterson	Aston Villa	Milton Keynes Dons
3 February 2025	31 May 2025	Ben Perry	Nottingham Forest	Northampton Town
3 February 2025	31 May 2025	Ryan Porteous	Watford	Preston North End
3 February 2025	31 May 2025	Michael Reindorf	Cardiff City	Bristol Rovers
3 February 2025	31 May 2025	Jordan Rhodes	Blackpool	Mansfield Town
3 February 2025	31 May 2025	Myles Roberts	Watford	Bristol Rovers
3 February 2025	31 May 2025	Clément Rodrigues	Bastia	Barnsley
3 February 2025	31 May 2025	Jeffrey Schlupp	Crystal Palace	Celtic
3 February 2025	31 May 2025	Anthony Scully	Portsmouth	Colchester United
3 February 2025	31 May 2025	Xavier Simons	Hull City	Wycombe Wanderers
3 February 2025	31 May 2025	Andy Smith	Hull City	Gillingham
3 February 2025	31 May 2025	Zak Sturge	Chelsea	Millwall
3 February 2025	31 May 2025	Sil Swinkels	Aston Villa	Bristol Rovers
3 February 2025	31 May 2025	Mathys Tel	Bayern Munich	Tottenham Hotspur
3 February 2025	31 May 2025	Stefanos Tzimas	Brighton & Hove Albion	1. FC Nürnberg
3 February 2025	31 May 2025	Caylan Vickers	Brighton & Hove Albion	Mansfield Town
3 February 2025	31 May 2025	Caleb Wiley	Chelsea	Watford
3 February 2025	31 May 2025	Ben Whitfield	Burton Albion	Barrow
3 February 2025	31 May 2025	Tom Wilson-Brown	Leicester City	Kilmarnock
3 February 2025	31 May 2025	Cauley Woodrow	Luton Town	Blackburn Rovers
3 February 2025	31 May 2025	Jacob Wright	Manchester City	Norwich City
3 February 2025	31 May 2025	Ayumu Yokoyama	Birmingham City	Genk
3 February 2025	31 May 2025	Kadan Young	Aston Villa	Antwerp
