= 2026–27 Accrington Stanley F.C. season =

58th season in existence of Accrington Stanley FC

Accrington Stanley
2026–27 season
- Owner: Andy Holt
- Manager: John Doolan
- Stadium: Crown Ground

The 2026–27 season is the 58th season in the history of Accrington Stanley Football Club and their fourth consecutive season in League Two. In addition to the domestic league, the club are also to participate in the FA Cup, the EFL Cup, and the EFL Trophy.

== Transfers and contracts ==
=== In ===
Date	Pos.	Player	From	Fee	Ref.
1 July 2026 (Note: The transfer was announced on 23 June, and would become official on July 1 once Anderson's contract at Barrow expired.)	CB	(England) Joe Anderson	(England) Barrow	Free	
1 July 2026 (Note: The transfer was announced on 29 June, and would become official on July 1 once Mols' contract at Tamworth expired.)	CAM	(Spain) Stefan Mols	(England) Tamworth	Free	
1 July 2026 (Note: The transfer was announced on 23 June, and would become official on July 1 once Moore's contract at Southport expired.)	CB	(England) Tom Moore	(England) Southport	Free	
9 July 2026	CF	(England) Cole Stockton	(England) Salford City	Free	
16 July 2026	LB	(Democratic Republic of the Congo) David Tutonda	(England) Rochdale	Free	
10 September 2026	CB	(England) Oliver Smith	(England) Bolton Wanderers	Free	
7 November 2026	CAM	(England) Ronan Darcy	(England) Wigan Athletic	Free	

=== Out ===
Date	Pos.	Player	To	Fee	Ref.
26 August 2026	LB	(England) Freddie Sass	(England) Forest Green Rovers	Undisclosed	

=== Loaned in ===
Date	Pos.	Player	From	Loaned until	Ref.
30 June 2026	GK	(England) Louie Moulden	(England) Norwich City	End of Season	
31 August 2026	RW	(England) Joel Catesby	(England) Everton	End of Season	
31 August 2026	LW	(England) Charlie Warren	(England) Bolton Wanderers	End of Season	
1 September 2026	CM	(Scotland) Aidan Borland	(England) Aston Villa	End of Season	

=== Loaned out ===
Date	Pos.	Player	To	Loaned until	Ref.
4 August 2026	CF	(England) Anjola Popoola	(England) Chorley	End of Season	

=== Released / Out of Contract ===
Date	Pos.	Player	Subsequent club	Join date	Ref.
30 June 2026	CM	(England) Charlie Hall			
30 June 2026	GK	(Republic of Ireland) Michael Kelly			
30 June 2026	CAM	(England) Dan Martin			
30 June 2026	CM	(England) Finlay Tunstall			

=== New Contract ===
Date	Pos.	Player	Contract until	Ref.
4 May 2026	CDM	(England) Liam Coyle	30 June 2027	
4 May 2026	CM	(England) Conor Grant	30 June 2027	
4 May 2026	CF	(England) Kelsey Mooney	30 June 2027	
4 May 2026	RB	(Republic of Ireland) Connor O'Brien	30 June 2027	
4 May 2026	CF	(England) Anjola Popoola	30 June 2027	
4 May 2026	GK	(England) James Rogerson	30 June 2027	
29 June 2026	CDM	(Republic of Ireland) Seamus Conneely	30 June 2027	

== Pre-season and friendlies ==
On 20 May, Stanley announced two home pre-season friendlies, against Blackburn Rovers and Bury. Eight days later, a third fixture against Chorley was confirmed. A fourth friendly was later added, against Sheffield Wednesday. On 10 June, a fifth fixture was announced against Bradford City.

Win Draw Loss Fixtures

11 July 2026 Friendly	Accrington Stanley	0–0	Blackburn Rovers	Accrington
15:00 BST		Report		Stadium: Wham Stadium; Attendance: 3,982 (1,913 Blackburn fans)

17 July 2026 Friendly	Accrington Stanley	1–0	Bradford City	Accrington
19:30 BST	Brown 35'	Report		Stadium: Wham Stadium; Attendance: 1,034 (575 BCFC)

25 July 2026 Friendly	Chorley	0–3	Accrington Stanley	Chorley
15:00 BST			Caton 55', 59'; Trialist 84'	Stadium: Grant Store Victory Park Stadium

28 July 2026 Friendly	Accrington Stanley	1–0	Bury	Accrington
19:30 BST	Caton 56'	Report		Stadium: Wham Stadium; Attendance: 959 (449 Bury fans)

1 August 2026 Friendly	Accrington Stanley	0–0	Sheffield Wednesday	Accrington
12:30 BST		Report		Stadium: Wham Stadium; Attendance: 2,003 (1,363 away)

== Competitions ==
=== League Two ===
==== League table ====
Pos	Team	Pld	W	D	L	GF	GA	GD	Pts
11	Fleetwood Town	15	5	5	5	19	18	+1	20
12	Gillingham	15	5	5	5	20	21	−1	20
13	Accrington Stanley	15	4	7	4	25	21	+4	19
14	Newport County	15	4	7	4	22	19	+3	19
15	Tranmere Rovers	15	4	7	4	19	18	+1	19

Updated to match(es) played on 14 November 2026. Source: EFL Official Website
Rules for classification: 1) Points; 2) Goal difference; 3) Number of goals scored; 4) Head-to-head results; 5) Wins; 6) Away goals; 7) Penalty points (sec 9.5); 8) 12-point sending off offences

==== Results summary ====
Overall								Home						Away					
Pld	W	D	L	GF	GA	GD	Pts	W	D	L	GF	GA	GD	W	D	L	GF	GA	GD
15	4	7	4	25	21	+4	19	3	4	0	13	8	+5	1	3	4	12	13	−1

Last updated: 14 November 2026.
Source: Soccerway

==== Results by round ====
Round	1	2	3	4	5	6	7	8	9	10	11	12	13	14	15	16	17	18	19	20	21	22	23	24
Ground	H	A	A	H	H	A	H	A	H	A	H	A	A	H	A	H	A	H	A	H	A	H	H	A
Result	D	L	L	D	W	L	D	D	W	D	W	D	W	D	L									
Position	11	19	22	23	19	21	21	19	16	15	10	11	9	9	13									
Points	1	1	1	2	5	5	6	7	10	11	14	15	18	19	19									

Source: Soccerway
A = Away; H = Home; W = Win; D = Draw; L = Loss; P = Postponed

==== Matches ====
On 25 June, the League Two fixtures were revealed.

Win Draw Loss Fixtures

15 August 2026 1	Accrington Stanley	2–2	Colchester United	Accrington
15:00 BST	Caton 29', 45+1'; Anderson (yellow card) 89'	Report	Iandolo 24'; Hunt 60'	Stadium: Wham Stadium; Attendance: 1,959 (331 Colchester fans); Referee: Elliott Swallow

22 August 2026 2	Exeter City	2–0	Accrington Stanley	Exeter
15:00 BST	Fitzwater 2', (yellow card) 68'; Conneely 13' (o.g.); Wareham (yellow card) 48'; Harper (yellow card) 55'	Report	Woods (yellow card) 45+1'; Moore (yellow card) 85'	Stadium: St James Park; Attendance: 5,939 (inc. 104 away supporters); Referee: Scott Jackson

29 August 2026 3	Walsall	3–2	Accrington Stanley	Bescot
15:00 BST	Smith 8'; Burke 45+6'; Sprangler (yellow card) 49'; Pressley 53'; Moore (yellow card) 75'; Skura (yellow card) 79'; Ahui (yellow card) 90+1'	Report	Woods 12'; Mols 57'; Coyle (yellow card) 60'; Walton (yellow card) 75'	Stadium: Pallet-Track Bescot Stadium; Attendance: 5,116; Referee: William Davis

1 September 2026 4	Accrington Stanley	2–2	Grimsby Town	Accrington
19:45 BST	Woods 45+7' (pen.), (yellow card) 89'; Walton 60'; Whalley (yellow card) 70'; Matthews (yellow card) 90+1'; Anderson (yellow card) 90+8'	Report	Anderson 6' (o.g.); Cook 38'; McJannet (yellow card) 76'	Stadium: Wham Stadium; Attendance: 1,920; Referee: Michael Barlow

5 September 2026 5	Accrington Stanley	3–2	Crawley Town	Accrington
15:00 BST	Caton 4', 55'; Matthews (yellow card) 30', (goal) 63'; Rawson (yellow card) 42'; Whalley (yellow card) 53'; Tutonda (yellow card) 73'	Report	Orsi 20'; Farquharson (yellow card) 45+3'; Krasniqi (yellow card) 61'; Aderoju 79'	Stadium: Wham Stadium; Referee: Thomas Kirk

12 September 2026 6	Barnet	2–1	Accrington Stanley	Edgware
15:00 BST	Lakin 57', 72'	Report	Walton (yellow card) 6'; Woods (yellow card) 16'; Caton 27'; Anderson (yellow card) 29'; Matthews (yellow card) 55' (yellow-red card) 74'; O'Brien (yellow card) 81'	Stadium: Hive Stadium; Attendance: 1,900 (78 away)

19 September 2026 7	Accrington Stanley	0–0	Newport County	Accrington
15:00 BST	Love (yellow card) 21'; Mols (yellow card) 90+2'		Norman (yellow card) 78'; Biggins (yellow card) 83'	Stadium: Wham Stadium; Referee: Jamie Robinson

26 September 2026 8	Swindon Town	1–1	Accrington Stanley	Swindon
15:00 BST	Hungbo 31'; Majekodunmi (yellow card) 51'	Report	Woods 1', (yellow card) 66'	Stadium: The Nigel Eady County Ground; Attendance: 7,633 (82 away fans); Referee: Harrison Blair

3 October 2026 9	Accrington Stanley	2–0	Cheltenham Town	Accrington
15:00 BST	Walton (yellow card) 48'; Woods (yellow card) 74'; Warren 78', 87'; Tutonda (yellow card) 80'		McCann (yellow card) 42' (red card) 90+3'; Weimann (yellow card) 90+5'	Stadium: Wham Stadium; Referee: Jamie O'Connor

10 October 2026 10	Oldham Athletic	0–0	Accrington Stanley	Oldham
12:30 BST	Temple (yellow card) 11'; Drummond (yellow card) 75'; Robson (yellow card) 83'	Report	Anderson (yellow card) 8'; Tutonda (yellow card) 80'	Stadium: Boundary Park; Attendance: 6,756 (356 away); Referee: Ben Toner
Note: Fixture was initially scheduled for a 15:00 kick-off, but was brought forward for live Sky Sports broadcasting.

17 October 2026 11	Accrington Stanley	3–1	Gillingham	Accrington
15:00 BST	Matthews (yellow card) 6'; Mols 11'; Love (yellow card) 19'; Woods 28', 66'	Report	Waldock (yellow card) 21'; Matthews 31' (o.g.); Little (yellow card) 33'; Hale (yellow card) 79'	Stadium: Wham Stadium; Attendance: 1,874; Referee: Will Finnie

20 October 2026 12	York City	1–1	Accrington Stanley	Huntington
19:45 BST	Hunt (yellow card) 55'; Read (yellow card) 81'; Pearce 90'	Report	Love (yellow card) 14'; Woods 62'; Borland (yellow card) 82'; Mols (yellow card) 87'	Stadium: LNER Community Stadium; Attendance: 7,375; Referee: Declan Brown

24 October 2026 13	Rochdale	0–5	Accrington Stanley	Spotland
15:00 BST	Beckwith (yellow card) 87'	Report	Woods 14'; Warren 38', (yellow card) 58'; Tutonda (yellow card) 23'; Love (yellow card) 33'; Walton 45+1', 51'; Henderson (yellow card) 50', (goal) 66'	Stadium: Crown Oil Arena; Attendance: 4,029; Referee: Richie Watkins

31 October 2026 14	Accrington Stanley	1–1	Northampton Town	Accrington
15:00 GMT	Warren 5'; Mols (yellow card) 75'	Report	Warhurst (yellow card) 46'; Moore (yellow card) 66'; List 90+2'	Stadium: Wham Stadium; Attendance: 1,979 (552 away); Referee: Niall Smith

14 November 2026 15	Port Vale	4–2	Accrington Stanley	Burslem
15:00 GMT	Headley 8', 61'; Hall (yellow card) 10'; Dempsey 27', (yellow card) 90+3'; Moore 90' (o.g.)	Report	Henderson 58'; Walton 85'	Stadium: Vale Park; Attendance: 6,323 (165 ASFC fans); Referee: Simon Mather

21 November 2026 16	Accrington Stanley	v	Salford City	Accrington
15:00 GMT				Stadium: Wham Stadium

28 November 2026 17	Fleetwood Town	v	Accrington Stanley	Fleetwood
15:00 GMT				Stadium: Highbury Stadium

1 December 2026 18	Accrington Stanley	v	Crewe Alexandra	Accrington
19:45 GMT				Stadium: Wham Stadium

12 December 2026 19	Bristol Rovers	v	Accrington Stanley	Horfield
15:00 GMT				Stadium: Memorial Stadium

19 December 2026 20	Accrington Stanley	v	Chesterfield	Accrington
15:00 GMT				Stadium: Wham Stadium

26 December 2026 21	Tranmere Rovers	v	Accrington Stanley	Birkenhead
15:00 GMT				Stadium: Prenton Park

29 December 2026 22	Accrington Stanley	v	Rotherham United	Accrington
19:45 GMT				Stadium: Wham Stadium

1 January 2027 23	Accrington Stanley	v	Shrewsbury Town	Accrington
15:00 GMT				Stadium: Wham Stadium

9 January 2027 24	Chesterfield	v	Accrington Stanley	Whittington Moor
12:30 GMT				Stadium: SMH Group Stadium
Note: Fixture was initially scheduled for a 15:00 kick-off, but was brought forward for live Sky Sports broadcasting.

=== FA Cup ===
Accrington were drawn at home to Wycombe Wanderers in the first round.

Win Draw Loss Fixtures

7 November 2026 First round	Accrington Stanley	0–2	Wycombe Wanderers	Accrington
15:00 GMT	Whalley (yellow card) 61'; Matthews (yellow card) 87'	Report	Taylor 5', (yellow card) 87'; Harvie 69'	Stadium: Wham Stadium; Attendance: 1,510 (246 WW fans); Referee: Dale Baines

=== EFL Cup ===
Stanley were drawn away to Crewe Alexandra in the first round.

Win Draw Loss Fixtures

8 August 2026 First round	Crewe Alexandra	2–1	Accrington Stanley	Crewe
15:00 BST	Lankester 7' (pen.); Moore 85'	Report	Rawson (yellow card) 45+5', (goal) 65'; Anderson (yellow card) 74'; Love (yellow card) 90+2'	Stadium: Mornflake Stadium; Attendance: 2,961; Referee: Ross Martin

=== EFL Trophy ===
==== Group stage ====
Accrington were drawn against Salford City, Sheffield Wednesday and Sunderland U21 into Northern Group A.

Pos	Div	Team	Pld	W	PW	PL	L	GF	GA	GD	Pts	Qualification
1	L2	Accrington Stanley	3	1	2	0	0	8	4	+4	7	Advance to Round 2
2	L1	Sheffield Wednesday	3	2	0	0	1	4	5	−1	6	Advance to Round 2
3	L2	Salford City	2	0	0	1	1	2	3	−1	1	
4	ACA	Sunderland U21	2	0	0	1	1	3	5	−2	1	

Updated to match(es) played on 11 October 2026. Source: EFL

Win Draw Loss Fixtures

22 September 2026 Group stage	Accrington Stanley	3–3 (3–1 p)	Sunderland U21	Accrington
19:00 BST	Warren 26'; Stockton 51'; Mols 90+3'	Report	Samuel-Ogunsuyi 11', (yellow card) 88'; Jones (yellow card) 15'; Proctor 39'; Tutyerov 61'	Stadium: Wham Stadium; Attendance: 400 (54 away); Referee: Steven Copeland
	Penalties
	Mols (penalty scored); Woods (penalty scored); Walton (penalty scored)		Proctor (penalty scored); Whittaker (penalty missed); Tutyerov (penalty missed); Lightfoot (penalty missed)

6 October 20261 Group stage	Accrington Stanley	1–1 (5–4 p)	Salford City	Accrington
	Henderson (yellow card) 86'; Tutonda 90+8'		Udoh 51'; Butcher (yellow card) 74'	Stadium: Wham Stadium; Attendance: 610; Referee: Garreth Rhodes
	Penalties
	Mols (penalty scored); Brown (penalty scored); Anderson (penalty scored); Woods (penalty scored); Henderson (penalty scored)		(penalty scored) Garbutt; (penalty missed) Oluwo; (penalty scored) Cooper; (penalty scored) Mariani; (penalty scored) Graydon

11 November 2026 Group stage	Sheffield Wednesday	0–4	Accrington Stanley	Owlerton
19:00 GMT	Thornton (yellow card) 52'; Onoh (yellow card) 67'	Report	Rawson (yellow card) 32'; J. Smith 39'; Brown 42'; O. Smith (yellow card) 81'; Warren 86'; Caton 90+5'	Stadium: Hillsborough Stadium; Attendance: 5,472; Referee: Rob Massey-Ellis
Note: Fixture was initially scheduled for 10 November, but was pushed back a day due to Sheffield Wednesday in FA Cup action on the preceding Sunday.

== Statistics ==
=== Appearances and goals ===
As of match played 14 November 2026

Players with no appearances are not included on the list; italics indicate a loaned in player

No.	Pos	Nat	Player	Total		League Two		FA Cup		EFL Cup		EFL Trophy	
No.	Pos	Nat	Player	Apps	Goals	Apps	Goals	Apps	Goals	Apps	Goals	Apps	Goals
1	GK	(England) ENG	Louie Moulden	17	0	15+0	0	1+0	0	1+0	0	0+0	0
2	DF	(Scotland) SCO	Donald Love	17	0	14+0	0	1+0	0	1+0	0	0+1	0
3	DF	(England) ENG	Oliver Smith	4	0	0+1	0	0+0	0	0+0	0	3+0	0
4	DF	(England) ENG	Tom Moore	8	0	4+1	0	0+1	0	0+1	0	1+0	0
5	DF	(England) ENG	Farrend Rawson	10	1	7+0	0	1+0	0	1+0	1	1+0	0
6	MF	(Northern Ireland) NIR	Liam Coyle	8	0	5+3	0	0+0	0	0+0	0	0+0	0
7	FW	(England) ENG	Shaun Whalley	10	0	5+3	0	0+1	0	0+0	0	1+0	0
8	MF	(England) ENG	Conor Grant	11	0	1+7	0	1+0	0	0+0	0	1+1	0
10	MF	(England) ENG	Alex Henderson	17	2	5+7	2	1+0	0	1+0	0	3+0	0
13	FW	(England) ENG	Cole Stockton	9	1	0+7	0	0+0	0	1+0	0	1+0	1
14	MF	(Spain) ESP	Stefan Mols	17	3	10+2	2	1+0	0	0+1	0	0+3	1
16	MF	(Scotland) SCO	Aidan Borland	9	0	5+2	0	1+0	0	0+0	0	1+0	0
17	DF	(England) ENG	Devon Matthews	19	1	14+0	1	1+0	0	1+0	0	2+1	0
18	FW	(Wales) WAL	Charlie Caton	10	5	7+1	4	0+0	0	0+1	0	0+1	1
20	FW	(England) ENG	Charlie Brown	9	1	1+3	0	0+1	0	0+1	0	3+0	1
21	GK	(England) ENG	James Rogerson	3	0	0+0	0	0+0	0	0+0	0	3+0	0
22	DF	(England) ENG	Joe Anderson	17	0	14+0	0	1+0	0	1+0	0	1+0	0
23	MF	(England) ENG	Tyler Walton	16	4	12+1	4	1+0	0	0+0	0	1+1	0
25	DF	(England) ENG	Josh Smith	3	1	0+0	0	0+0	0	0+0	0	3+0	1
27	FW	(England) ENG	Joel Catesby	5	0	0+3	0	0+0	0	0+0	0	2+0	0
28	MF	(Republic of Ireland) IRL	Seamus Conneely	11	0	7+1	0	0+0	0	1+0	0	1+1	0
30	FW	(England) ENG	Charlie Warren	14	6	6+4	4	1+0	0	0+0	0	2+1	2
33	DF	(Democratic Republic of the Congo) COD	David Tutonda	14	1	11+1	0	0+0	0	1+0	0	0+1	1
38	DF	(Republic of Ireland) IRL	Connor O'Brien	13	0	10+0	0	0+0	0	1+0	0	1+1	0
39	FW	(England) ENG	Josh Woods	15	7	12+0	7	0+0	0	1+0	0	1+1	0
49	MF	(England) ENG	Ronan Darcy	3	0	0+1	0	0+1	0	0+0	0	1+0	0
Players who featured but departed the club permanently during the season:
3	DF	(England) ENG	Freddie Sass	1	0	0+0	0	0+0	0	0+1	0	0+0	0

=== Disciplinary record ===
As of match played 14 November 2026

Rank	No.	Pos.	Nat.	Name	League Two			FA Cup			EFL Cup			EFL Trophy			Total		
Rank	No.	Pos.	Nat.	Name	Yellow card	(yellow card) (yellow-red card)	Red card	Yellow card	(yellow card) (yellow-red card)	Red card	Yellow card	(yellow card) (yellow-red card)	Red card	Yellow card	(yellow card) (yellow-red card)	Red card	Yellow card	(yellow card) (yellow-red card)	Red card
1	17	CB	(England)	Devon Matthews	3	1	0	1	0	0	0	0	0	0	0	0	4	1	0
2	2	RB	(Scotland)	Donald Love	4	0	0	0	0	0	1	0	0	0	0	0	5	0	0
2	22	CB	(England)	Joe Anderson	4	0	0	0	0	0	1	0	0	0	0	0	5	0	0
2	39	CF	(England)	Josh Woods	5	0	0	0	0	0	0	0	0	0	0	0	5	0	0
5	33	LB	(Democratic Republic of the Congo)	David Tutonda	4	0	0	0	0	0	0	0	0	0	0	0	4	0	0
6	5	CB	(England)	Farrend Rawson	1	0	0	0	0	0	1	0	0	1	0	0	3	0	0
6	7	RW	(England)	Shaun Whalley	2	0	0	1	0	0	0	0	0	0	0	0	3	0	0
6	14	CM	(Spain)	Stefan Mols	3	0	0	0	0	0	0	0	0	0	0	0	3	0	0
6	23	RM	(England)	Tyler Walton	3	0	0	0	0	0	0	0	0	0	0	0	3	0	0
10	10	CAM	(England)	Alex Henderson	1	0	0	0	0	0	0	0	0	1	0	0	2	0	0
11	3	CB	(England)	Oliver Smith	0	0	0	0	0	0	0	0	0	1	0	0	1	0	0
11	4	CB	(England)	Tom Moore	1	0	0	0	0	0	0	0	0	0	0	0	1	0	0
11	6	CDM	(Northern Ireland)	Liam Coyle	1	0	0	0	0	0	0	0	0	0	0	0	1	0	0
11	16	CM	(Scotland)	Aidan Borland	1	0	0	0	0	0	0	0	0	0	0	0	1	0	0
11	30	RW	(England)	Charlie Warren	1	0	0	0	0	0	0	0	0	0	0	0	1	0	0
11	38	RB	(Republic of Ireland)	Connor O'Brien	1	0	0	0	0	0	0	0	0	0	0	0	1	0	0
Total					35	1	0	2	0	0	3	0	0	3	0	0	43	1	0

== Awards ==
=== Player awards ===
==== EFL League Two Player of the Month ====
Month	Player	Result	Ref.
October	(England) Josh Woods	Nominated	

==== PFA League Two Fans' Player of the Month ====
Month	Player	Result	Ref.
October	(England) Charlie Warren	Nominated	

=== Manager awards ===
==== EFL League Two Manager of the Month ====
Month	Manager	Result	Ref.
October	(England) John Doolan	Nominated	
