= Charlie Warren (footballer) =

English footballer (born 2004)

Personal information
- Full name: Charlie Roy Benjamin Warren
- Date of birth: 24 January 2004 (age 22)
- Place of birth: Ipswich, England
- Height: 6 ft 2 in (1.89 m)
- Position: Forward

Team information
- Current team: Accrington Stanley (on loan from Bolton Wanderers)
- Number: 30

Youth career
- Ipswich Town

Senior career*
Years	Team	Apps	(Gls)
2021–2022	Needham Market	0	(0)
2022–2025	Felixstowe & Walton United	124	(34)
2025–	Bolton Wanderers	1	(0)
2025–2026	→ Aldershot Town (loan)	22	(7)
2026–	→ Accrington Stanley (loan)	11	(4)
- * Club domestic league appearances and goals as of 13:45, 22 November 2026 (UTC)

Charlie Roy Benjamin Warren (born 24 January 2004) is an English professional footballer who plays as a forward for Accrington Stanley, on loan from EFL Championship club Bolton Wanderers.

== Career ==
After playing for Ipswich Town, Needham Market and Felixstowe & Walton United, he signed for Bolton Wanderers in June 2025. He picked up a minor injury in pre-season, but said that he was looking forward to the challenge of stepping up to professional football.

On 9 August 2025, Warren made his professional debut for Bolton as they beat Plymouth Argyle in a League One tie at the Toughsheet Community Stadium, coming on as a 83rd minute substitute. On 19 December 2025, Warren joined National League side, Aldershot Town on loan for the remainder of the 2025–26 campaign.

On 31 August 2026, Warren signed a new contract with Bolton until 2028, before moving on loan for Accrington Stanley later that day.

== Career statistics ==
As of match played 21 November 2026

Appearances and goals by club, season and competition
Club	Season	League			FA Cup		EFL Cup		Other		Total	
Club	Season	Division	Apps	Goals	Apps	Goals	Apps	Goals	Apps	Goals	Apps	Goals
Needham Market	2021–22	SL Premier Division Central	0	0	0	0	—		1 (Note: Appearance in Southern Football League Cup)	0	1	0
Felixstowe & Walton United	2021–22	IL North Division	20	3	—		—		6 (Note: Three appearances in FA Trophy, two in Alan Turvey Trophy, one in Suffolk Senior Cup)	0	26	3
Felixstowe & Walton United	2022–23	IL North Division	35	6	1	0	—		5 (Note: One appearance in FA Trophy, three in Alan Turvey Trophy, one in Suffolk Senior Cup)	0	41	6
Felixstowe & Walton United	2023–24	IL North Division	27	1	3	1	—		2 (Note: Appearance(s) in FA Trophy)	0	32	2
Felixstowe & Walton United	2024–25	IL North Division	42	24	4	5	—		9 (Note: Five appearances and three goals in FA Trophy, three appearances and one goal in Suffolk Senior Cup, one appearance in Isthmian League North Division play-offs)	4	55	33
Felixstowe & Walton United	Total		124	34	8	6	0	0	22	4	154	44
Bolton Wanderers	2025–26	League One	1	0	0	0	1	0	3 (Note: Appearances in EFL Trophy)	0	5	0
Bolton Wanderers	2026–27	Championship	0	0	0	0	0	0	0	0	0	0
Bolton Wanderers	Total		1	0	0	0	1	0	3	0	5	0
Aldershot Town (loan)	2025–26	National League	22	7	0	0	—		1 (Note: Appearances in National League Cup)	0	23	7
Accrington Stanley (loan)	2026–27	League Two	11	4	1	0	0	0	1	0	13	4
Career total			158	45	9	6	1	0	28	4	196	55
