= Joe Anderson (footballer, born 2001) =

English footballer (born 2001)

Personal information
- Full name: Joseph William Anderson
- Date of birth: 6 February 2001 (age 25)
- Place of birth: Stalybridge, England
- Height: 1.88 m (6 ft 2 in)
- Position: Defender

Team information
- Current team: Accrington Stanley
- Number: 22

Youth career
- Liverpool
- 2016–2023: Everton

Senior career*
Years	Team	Apps	(Gls)
2023–2026	Sunderland	6	(0)
2023–2024	→ Shrewsbury Town (loan)	24	(0)
2026	Barrow	14	(0)
2026–	Accrington Stanley	9	(0)
- * Club domestic league appearances and goals as of 20:00, 6 October 2026 (UTC)

Joseph William Anderson (born 6 February 2001) is an English professional footballer who plays as a defender for Accrington Stanley.

== Career ==
=== Early career ===
Born in Stalybridge, Anderson was a youth product of Liverpool, before moving to cross-town rivals Everton's youth academy at the age of 15 in 2016. On 3 July 2019, he signed his first professional contract with Everton for two years. On 7 July 2022, he signed a two-year extension to the contract ending in 2024.

=== Sunderland ===
Anderson signed for Sunderland in January 2023. He made his professional and senior debut with Sunderland as a late substitute in a 1–1 EFL Championship tie with Millwall on 4 February 2023.

On 24 July 2023, Anderson signed for EFL League One club Shrewsbury Town on a season-long loan.

=== Barrow ===
On 15 January 2026, Anderson joined League Two club Barrow on an eighteen-month deal.

=== Accrington Stanley ===
In June 2026 it was announced that Anderson would sign for Accrington Stanley on 1 July 2026.

== Style of play ==
Originally a left-back or left midfielder, he converted to centre-back as an under-18 with Everton.

== Career statistics ==
As of match played 6 October 2026

Appearances and goals by club, season and competition
Club	Season	League			FA Cup		EFL Cup		Other		Total	
Club	Season	Division	Apps	Goals	Apps	Goals	Apps	Goals	Apps	Goals	Apps	Goals
Everton U21s	2019–20 EFL Trophy		—		—		—		1 (Note: Appearance(s) in EFL Trophy)	0	1	0
Everton U21s	2021–22 EFL Trophy		—		—		—		2	0	2	0
Everton U21s	2022–23 EFL Trophy		—		—		—		4	0	4	0
Everton U21s	Total		—		—		—		7	0	7	0
Sunderland	2022–23	Championship	4	0	0	0	0	0	—		4	0
Sunderland	2023–24	Championship	0	0	0	0	0	0	—		0	0
Sunderland	2024–25	Championship	2	0	0	0	1	0	—		3	0
Sunderland	2025–26	Premier League	0	0	0	0	0	0	—		0	0
Sunderland	Total		6	0	0	0	1	0	0	0	7	0
Shrewsbury Town (loan)	2023–24	League One	24	0	3	0	1	0	2	0	30	0
Barrow	2025–26	League Two	14	0	0	0	0	0	—		14	0
Accrington Stanley	2026–27	League Two	9	0	0	0	0	0	1	0	10	0
Career total			53	0	3	0	2	0	10	0	68	0
