= Louie Moulden =

English footballer (born 2002)

Personal information
- Full name: Louie Paul Moulden
- Date of birth: 6 January 2002 (age 24)
- Place of birth: Bolton, England
- Height: 6 ft 3 in (1.90 m)
- Position: Goalkeeper

Team information
- Current team: Accrington Stanley (on loan from Norwich City)
- Number: 1

Youth career
- Liverpool
- Manchester City

Senior career*
Years	Team	Apps	(Gls)
2020–2021	Manchester City	0	(0)
2020	→ Gloucester City (loan)	7	(0)
2021–2024	Wolverhampton Wanderers	0	(0)
2022	→ Ebbsfleet United (loan)	17	(0)
2022–2023	→ Solihull Moors (loan)	16	(0)
2023–2024	→ Rochdale (loan)	28	(0)
2024	→ Northampton Town (loan)	12	(0)
2024–2025	Crystal Palace	0	(0)
2025–	Norwich City	0	(0)
2026–	→ Accrington Stanley (loan)	16	(0)

International career^{‡}
2017–2018	England U16	3	(0)
2018–2019	England U17	11	(0)
2019	England U18	2	(0)
- * Club domestic league appearances and goals as of 13:44, 22 November 2026 (UTC) ‡ National team caps and goals as of 8 September 2019

Louie Paul Moulden (born 6 January 2002) is an English professional footballer who plays as a goalkeeper for EFL League Two club Accrington Stanley, on loan from EFL Championship club Norwich City.

== Personal life ==
Born in Bolton, Moulden is the son of former player Paul Moulden.

== Club career ==
=== Early career ===
Moulden began his career with Liverpool and Manchester City; his transfer between the two was investigated by regulators. He spent time on loan at Gloucester City.

=== Wolverhampton Wanderers ===
Moulden then signed for Wolverhampton Wanderers in 2021, spending further loan spells at Ebbsfleet United, Solihull Moors, and Rochdale. He was recalled from his loan at Rochdale in January 2024, and signed on loan for Northampton Town later that month. Moulden said he would challenge for the starting position, a sentiment echoed by Northampton manager Jon Brady.

=== Crystal Palace ===
On 22 August 2024, Moulden joined Crystal Palace on a free transfer. He was released by the club at the end of the 2024–25 season.

=== Norwich City ===
In June 2025 it was announced that Moulden would join Norwich City on 1 July 2025.

In June 2026 he signed on loan for Accrington Stanley.

== International career ==
Moulden was a member of the England U17 squad at the 2019 UEFA European Under-17 Championship and started in their opening game of the tournament against France.

== Career statistics ==
As of match played 21 November 2026

Appearances and goals by club, season and competition
Club	Season	League			FA Cup		League Cup		Other		Total	
Club	Season	Division	Apps	Goals	Apps	Goals	Apps	Goals	Apps	Goals	Apps	Goals
Gloucester City (loan)	2020–21	National League North	7	0	0	0	0	0	0	0	7	0
Wolverhampton Wanderers U21	2021–22	—			—		—		2 (Note: Appearance(s) in EFL Trophy)	0	2	0
Wolverhampton Wanderers	2021–22	Premier League	0	0	0	0	0	0	0	0	0	0
Wolverhampton Wanderers	2022–23	Premier League	0	0	0	0	0	0	0	0	0	0
Wolverhampton Wanderers	2023–24	Premier League	0	0	0	0	0	0	0	0	0	0
Wolverhampton Wanderers	Total		0	0	0	0	0	0	0	0	0	0
Ebbsfleet United (loan)	2021–22	National League South	17	0	0	0	0	0	2 (Note: Appearance(s) in National League South play-offs)	0	19	0
Solihull Moors (loan)	2022–23	National League	16	0	1	0	0	0	0	0	17	0
Rochdale (loan)	2023–24	National League	28	0	1	0	0	0	0	0	29	0
Northampton Town (loan)	2023–24	League One	12	0	0	0	0	0	0	0	12	0
Crystal Palace	2024–25	Premier League	0	0	0	0	0	0	0	0	0	0
Norwich City	2025–26	Championship	0	0	0	0	0	0	0	0	0	0
Norwich City	2026–27	Championship	0	0	0	0	0	0	0	0	0	0
Norwich City	Total		0	0	0	0	0	0	0	0	0	0
Accrington Stanley (loan)	2026–27	League Two	16	0	1	0	1	0	0	0	18	0
Career total			96	0	3	0	1	0	4	0	104	0
