= Aidan Borland =

Scottish footballer (born 2007)

Personal information
- Full name: Aidan Gerald Borland
- Date of birth: 25 April 2007 (age 19)
- Place of birth: Glasgow, Scotland
- Height: 1.77 m (5 ft 10 in)
- Position: Defensive midfielder

Team information
- Current team: Accrington Stanley (on loan from Aston Villa)
- Number: 16

Youth career
- –2023: Celtic
- 2023–2024: Aston Villa

Senior career*
Years	Team	Apps	(Gls)
2024–	Aston Villa	0	(0)
2026	→ Swindon Town (loan)	12	(0)
2026–	→ Accrington Stanley (loan)	3	(0)

International career^{‡}
2023	Scotland U16	1	(0)
2023	Scotland U17	3	(0)
2024–	Scotland U19	1	(0)
2025–	Scotland U21	2	(0)
- * Club domestic league appearances and goals as of 14 October 2026 ‡ National team caps and goals as of 14 October 2026

Aidan Gerald Borland (born 25 April 2007) is a Scottish professional footballer who plays as a defensive midfielder for EFL League Two club Accrington Stanley, on loan from Premier League club Aston Villa.

Borland is a product of the Celtic and Aston Villa academies and has represented Scotland at youth international levels up to U21.

== Club career ==
Born in Glasgow, Borland started his football career at the academy of local club Celtic, before moving to Premier League club Aston Villa's academy in August 2023. Borland turned professional on 29 April 2024, signing a long-term contract with Villa.

On 24 September 2024, Borland made his senior debut as a substitute in an EFL Cup win away to Wycombe Wanderers.

On 5 May 2025, Borland started and played the full 90 minutes in the FA Youth Cup final, where his team won 3–1 against Manchester City U18s. On 13 May, Borland signed a long-term contract extension with Aston Villa. Borland was named as one of the Premier League's Scholars of the Year in May 2025.

On 3 January 2026, Borland joined EFL League Two club Swindon Town on loan until the end of the season.

On 1 September 2026, Borland joined EFL League Two club Accrington Stanley on loan until the end of the season.

== International career ==
Borland has represented Scotland at U16, U17, U19 and U21 levels.

== Career statistics ==
As of 10 October 2026

Appearances and goals by club, season and competition
Club	Season	League			National cup		League cup		Continental		Other		Total	
Club	Season	Division	Apps	Goals	Apps	Goals	Apps	Goals	Apps	Goals	Apps	Goals	Apps	Goals
Aston Villa	2023–24	Premier League	—		—		—		—		1 (Note: Appearances in EFL Trophy)	0	1	0
Aston Villa	2024–25	Premier League	0	0	0	0	1	0	0	0	3	0	4	0
Aston Villa	2025–26	Premier League	0	0	0	0	0	0	0	0	2	0	2	0
Aston Villa	2026–27	Premier League	0	0	0	0	0	0	0	0	0	0	0	0
Aston Villa	Total		0	0	0	0	1	0	0	0	6	0	7	0
Swindon Town (loan)	2025–26	EFL League Two	12	0	1	0	—		0	0	1	0	14	0
Accrington Stanley (loan)	2026–27	EFL League Two	3	0	0	0	—		—		1	0	4	0
Career total			15	0	1	0	1	0	0	0	8	0	25	0

== Honours ==
=== Club ===
Aston Villa U21s

- Birmingham Senior Cup: 2023–24

Aston Villa U18s

- FA Youth Cup: 2024–25
