= Tai Sodje =

English footballer (born 2003)

Personal information
- Full name: Taione Richard Evumena Sodje
- Date of birth: 20 September 2003 (age 23)
- Place of birth: Sheffield, England
- Height: 1.79 m (5 ft 10 in)
- Position: Forward

Team information
- Current team: Walsall
- Number: 7

Youth career
- Sheffield United
- 2015–2025: Manchester City

Senior career*
Years	Team	Apps	(Gls)
2025–2026	Buxton	21	(11)
2026–	Walsall	10	(2)
- * Club domestic league appearances and goals as of 15:07, 24 June 2026 (BST)

Taione Richard Evumena Sodje (born 20 September 2003) is an English professional footballer who plays as a forward for EFL League Two club Walsall.

== Club career ==
Born in Sheffield to an English mother and Nigerian father, Sodje began his footballing career with local side Sheffield United, before a switch to Premier League side Manchester City in 2015. He signed a professional contract with Manchester City in July 2021. Despite suffering an injury in late October 2021, which he described as the worst moment of his career, he returned to action for Manchester City's youth teams in April 2022.

On 11 June 2025, Sodje was released by Manchester City.

On 7 August 2025, Sodje signed for National League North club Buxton, making his debut on the opening day of the season against Radcliffe. And Helped Buxton F.C win 6-0 Over Alfreton Town F.C.

On 17 July 2026, Sodje signed for League Two club Walsall on a 2 year deal with an option of a further year. On 13 October 2026, Sodje scored his first two goals for Walsall in the EFL Trophy against Fulham Under-21s in a 3-2 win. He scored his first League Two goal a few days later as an equaliser vs Swindon Town on the 17 October 2026.

== International career ==
Eligible to represent both England and Nigeria, Sodje reportedly turned down an invitation to the England under-19 squad in October 2021. He was quoted in May 2022 as saying he would choose to represent whichever nation approached him first.

== Style of play ==
Described by Manchester City as a "prolific goal-scorer" and a "versatile striker [who] can also operate to impressive effect on both the right or left flanks", Sodje describes himself as a "goal scorer", capable of playing "across the front three".

== Personal life ==
Sodje is the son of former professional rugby league player Bright Sodje, and the nephew of former Nigerian international footballers Efe and Sam Sodje, as well as former professional footballer Akpo Sodje.

== Career statistics ==
=== Club ===
As of match played 13 October 2026

Appearances and goals by club, season and competition
Club	Season	League			FA Cup		EFL Cup		Other		Total	
Club	Season	Division	Apps	Goals	Apps	Goals	Apps	Goals	Apps	Goals	Apps	Goals
Manchester City U21	2021–22	—			—		—		2 (Note: Appearances in the EFL Trophy)	0	2	0
Manchester City U21	2024–25	—			—		—		1	0	1	0
Buxton	2025–26	National League North	21	11	2	1	—		2	0	25	12
Walsall	2026–27	League Two	10	2	0	0	1	0	2	2	13	4
Career total			31	13	2	1	1	0	7	2	41	16
