= Josh Woods (footballer) =

English footballer (born 2000)

Personal information
- Full name: Josh Stanley Ronald Woods
- Date of birth: 5 July 2000 (age 26)
- Place of birth: Skelmersdale, England
- Height: 1.79 m (5 ft 10 in)
- Position: Striker

Team information
- Current team: Accrington Stanley
- Number: 39

Youth career
- Marine

Senior career*
Years	Team	Apps	(Gls)
2019	Marine	1	(0)
- Clay Brow
2021–	Accrington Stanley	120	(19)
- * Club domestic league appearances and goals as of 18:59, 26 October 2026 (UTC)

Josh Stanley Ronald Woods (born 5 July 2000) is an English professional footballer who plays as a striker for EFL League Two club Accrington Stanley.

== Early life ==
Woods was raised in Skelmersdale. His father was a matchday steward at Liverpool.

== Career ==
Woods played for Marine's reserve side and scored on his first-team debut in a friendly on 15 October 2019 against Salford City. He made his league debut on 19 October, and scored his first competitive goal in the Liverpool Senior Cup on 26 November. He was the first player from the newly formed reserves team to play for the Marine first team.

After playing in non-league for Clay Brow, and working as a barber, Woods signed an initial one-year contract with Accrington Stanley in July 2021. At the end of the 2023–24 season, a contract extension was triggered.

== Personal life ==
Woods is a Liverpool fan. His older brother Dale is also a footballer.

== Career statistics ==
As of match played on 24 October 2026

Appearances and goals by club, season and competition
Club	Season	League			FA Cup		EFL Cup		Other		Total	
Club	Season	Division	Apps	Goals	Apps	Goals	Apps	Goals	Apps	Goals	Apps	Goals
Accrington Stanley	2021–22	League One	3	0	0	0	0	0	0	0	3	0
Accrington Stanley	2022–23	League One	10	1	2	0	1	0	2 (Note: Appearances in the EFL Trophy)	0	15	1
Accrington Stanley	2023–24	League Two	32	1	1	0	0	0	5	0	38	1
Accrington Stanley	2024–25	League Two	31	5	3	1	1	0	3	1	38	7
Accrington Stanley	2025–26	League Two	32	5	1	0	3	1	3	1	39	7
Accrington Stanley	2026–27	League Two	12	7	0	0	1	0	2	0	15	7
Career total			120	19	7	1	6	1	15	2	148	23
