= Rico Browne =

Footballer (born 2003)

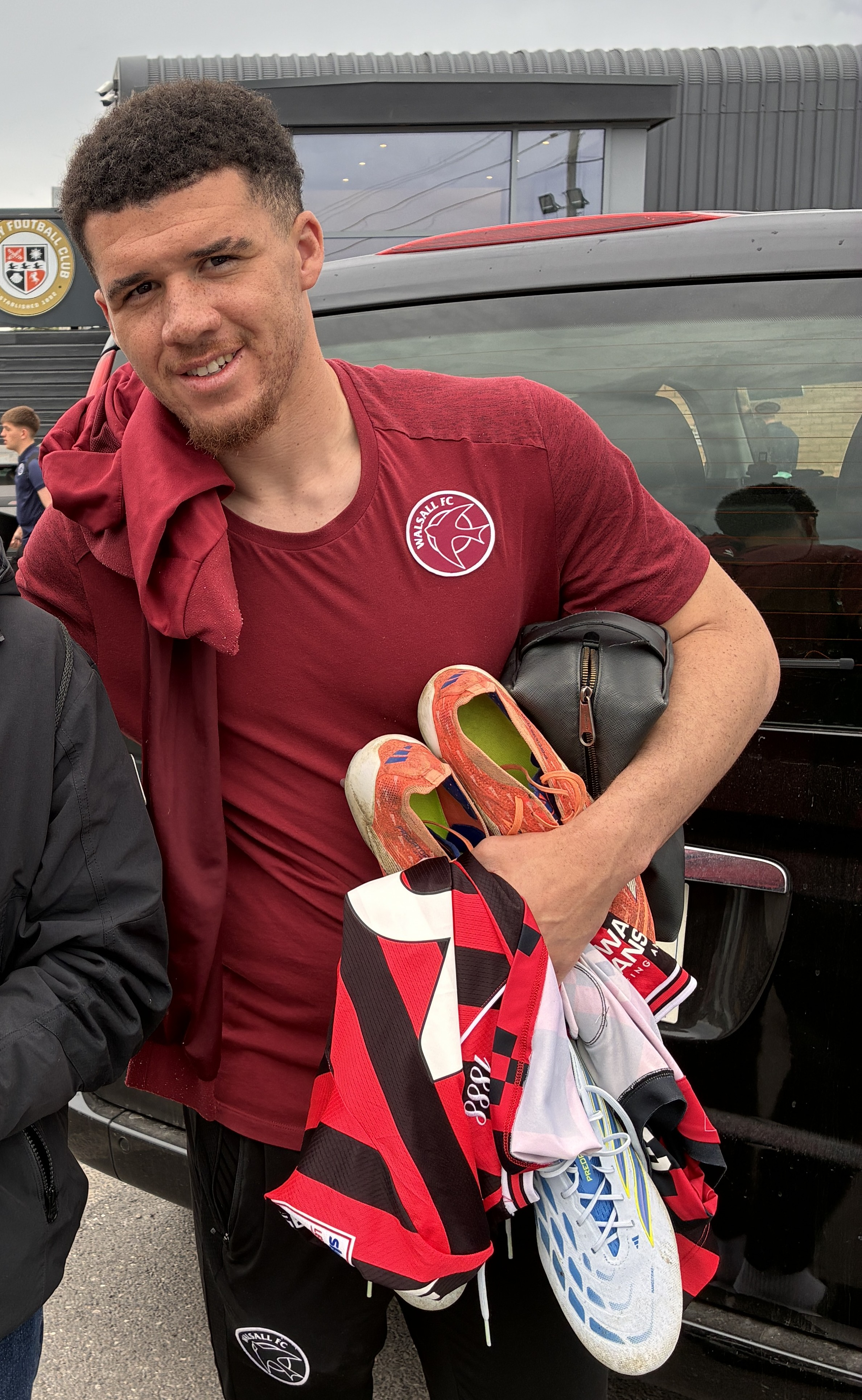
- Browne in 2026

Personal information
- Full name: Rico Franklin Browne
- Date of birth: 28 December 2003 (age 22)
- Place of birth: Manchester, England
- Height: 1.88 m (6 ft 2 in)
- Position: Defender

Team information
- Current team: Woking (on loan from Walsall)
- Number: 33

Youth career
- Elche
- 2016–2023: Birmingham City

Senior career*
Years	Team	Apps	(Gls)
2023–2024	Birmingham City	0	(0)
2023–2024	→ Rushall Olympic (loan)	18	(1)
2024–	Walsall	23	(1)
2024	→ Tamworth (loan)	4	(0)
2026–	→ Woking (loan)	1	(0)

International career^{‡}
2019	Saint Kitts and Nevis U17	2	(0)
2026–	Saint Kitts and Nevis	5	(0)
- * Club domestic league appearances and goals as of 19:10, 25 October 2026 (UTC) ‡ National team caps and goals as of 16:50, 17 November 2026 (UTC)

Rico Franklin Browne (born 28 December 2003) is a professional footballer who plays as a defender for National League club Woking on loan from Walsall. Born in England, he is an international for Saint Kitts and Nevis.

== Club career ==
Born in Manchester, Browne played for the youth teams of Elche and Birmingham City, joining the latter in 2016. He went up all their youth categories, going on to captain their U21 side. On 27 June 2022, he signed his first professional contract with Birmingham until 2024. He spent the 2023–24 season on loan with Rushall Olympic in the National League. His Rushall Olympic manager Liam McDonald said of Browne, "I've managed a lot of defenders over the years that have gone on and played Championship football but Rico [Browne] is up there with the best I've had." Browne was offered a new contract by Birmingham in May 2024, but rejected it.

Browne signed for Walsall in September 2024, after going on a trial with them. He moved on loan to Tamworth in October 2024, for one month. He returned to Walsall on 11 November, following five first-team appearances for Tamworth, including a 1–0 cup upset over EFL League One side Huddersfield. On 12 November 2024, he made his Walsall debut in a 3–0 win over Shrewsbury in the EFL Trophy, which Walsall coach Darren Byfield said that he should be "proud" about. Browne scored his first professional goal for Walsall in a 4–2 victory against Newport on 8 November 2025. He extended his contract with Walsall in June 2026. On 17 October 2026, Browne joined National League club Woking on a three-month loan deal.

== International career ==
Born in England, Browne is of Kititian descent. He played for the Saint Kitts and Nevis U17s in 2019. He was called up to the senior Saint Kitts and Nevis national football team for the 2023 CONCACAF Gold Cup.

Browne made his first appearance for the senior team starting in a 2026–27 CONCACAF Nations League match against Bonaire on 25 September 2026.

== Career statistics ==
As of 4 November 2026

Appearances and goals by club, season and competition
Club	Season	League			FA Cup		EFL Cup		Other		Total	
Club	Season	Division	Apps	Goals	Apps	Goals	Apps	Goals	Apps	Goals	Apps	Goals
Birmingham City	2023–24	Championship	0	0	0	0	0	0	0	0	0	0
Rushall Olympic (loan)	2023–24	National League North	18	1	0	0	—		0	0	18	1
Walsall	2024–25	League Two	0	0	0	0	0	0	3 (Note: Appearances in EFL Trophy)	0	3	0
Walsall	2025–26	League Two	21	1	2	0	0	0	5	0	28	1
Walsall	2026–27	League Two	2	0	0	0	2	0	1	0	5	0
Walsall	Total		23	1	2	0	2	0	9	0	36	1
Tamworth (loan)	2024–25	National League	4	0	1	0	—		0	0	5	0
Woking (loan)	2026–27	National League	1	0	1	0	—		1 (Note: Appearance(s) in National League Cup)	0	3	0
Career total			46	2	4	0	2	0	10	0	62	2
