= Charlie Crew =

Welsh footballer (born 2006)

Personal information
- Full name: Charles David Crew
- Date of birth: 15 June 2006 (age 20)
- Place of birth: Cardiff, Wales
- Height: 1.85 m (6 ft 1 in)
- Position: Defensive midfielder

Team information
- Current team: Walsall (on loan from Leeds United)
- Number: 8

Youth career
- 2013–2022: Cardiff City
- 2022–2024: Leeds United

Senior career*
Years	Team	Apps	(Gls)
2024–	Leeds United	1	(0)
2025	→ Doncaster Rovers (loan)	13	(0)
2025–2026	→ Doncaster Rovers (loan)	7	(0)
2026–	→ Walsall (loan)	12	(0)

International career^{‡}
2020–2021	Wales U15	1	(0)
2021–2022	Wales U16	4	(0)
2022–2023	Wales U17	17	(1)
2023	Wales U19	3	(0)
2023–	Wales U21	11	(0)
2024–	Wales	2	(0)
- * Club domestic league appearances and goals ‡ National team caps and goals as of 19:29, 8 October 2026 (UTC)

Charles David Crew (born 15 June 2006) is a Welsh footballer who plays as a defensive midfielder for EFL League Two club Walsall on loan from Premier League club Leeds United and the Wales national team.

== Club career ==
Crew started his career at Cardiff City, where he played in the club's academy from the age of seven. In 2022, he transferred to Leeds United for an undisclosed fee, joining the club's under 18s initially, before being promoted to the under 21s in January 2023. Crew spent the 2023–24 season with the Leeds Under 21 team and was called up to the first-team squad for the first time on 29 March 2024, where he was an unused substitute against Watford.

Crew also represented the Leeds United Under 18 Team in the FA Youth Cup throughout the 2023–24 season and scored one of the goals in the 4–3 semi-final win over Millwall Under 18s to seal Leeds' place in the final.

On 12 July 2024, Leeds United announced that Crew had signed a long-term deal with the club, through to 2028.

Crew made his first team debut on 2 November 2024 in the 3–0 Championship win against Plymouth Argyle, as an 86th-minute substitute for Joël Piroe.

On 15 January 2025, Crew signed for EFL League Two club Doncaster Rovers on loan for the remainder of the 2024–25 season. On 6 August 2025, Crew rejoined Doncaster Rovers on a season-long loan or their 2025–26 EFL League One campaign, following their promotion.

On 5 August 2026, Crew signed for EFL League Two club Walsall on a season long loan, Crew made his debut for Walsall the following day as a 62nd-minute substitute in an EFL Cup upset 1–0 win against Bristol City.

== International career ==
Crew has represented Wales at Under 15, Under 16, Under 17, Under 18 and Under 21 levels. He has captained his country at each of these levels, up to and including Under 18. In 2021–2022, Crew was the captain of the Wales squad that won the Victory Shield. Crew was named as captain of the Wales Under 17 squad for the 2023 UEFA European Under-17 Championships, held in Hungary. In 2023, he was called up to the Wales national under-21 football team despite being just 16 years old, leading him to be labeled as a 'prodigy' by the Yorkshire Post.

Crew has family from England, and in October 2023 officials from The Football Association were reported as expressing an interest in having Crew represent England instead of Wales.

In May 2024 Crew was called up to the Wales senior squad for the first time. Crew made his debut for the Wales national team on 6 June 2024 in a friendly against Gibraltar at the Estádio Algarve in Portugal. He substituted Charlie Savage in the 78th minute as the game ended in a scoreless draw.

== Career statistics ==
=== Club ===
As of match played 10 February 2026

Appearances and goals by club, season and competition
Club	Season	League			FA Cup		EFL Cup		Other		Total	
Club	Season	Division	Apps	Goals	Apps	Goals	Apps	Goals	Apps	Goals	Apps	Goals
Leeds United	2024–25	Championship	1	0	0	0	0	0	—		1	0
Doncaster Rovers (loan)	2024–25	League Two	13	0	0	0	0	0	—		13	0
Doncaster Rovers (loan)	2025–26	League One	7	0	1	0	1	0	1	0	10	0
Doncaster Rovers (loan)	Total		20	0	1	0	1	0	1	0	23	0
Walsall (loan)	2026–27	League Two	12	0	0	0	2	0	2	0	16	0
Career total			33	0	1	0	3	0	3	0	40	0

=== International ===
As of match played 9 September 2025

Appearances and goals by national team and year
National team	Year	Apps	Goals
Wales	2024	1	0
Wales	2025	1	0
Total		2	0

== Honours ==
Doncaster Rovers

- EFL League Two: 2024–25
