= Aaron Pressley =

Scottish footballer (born 2001)

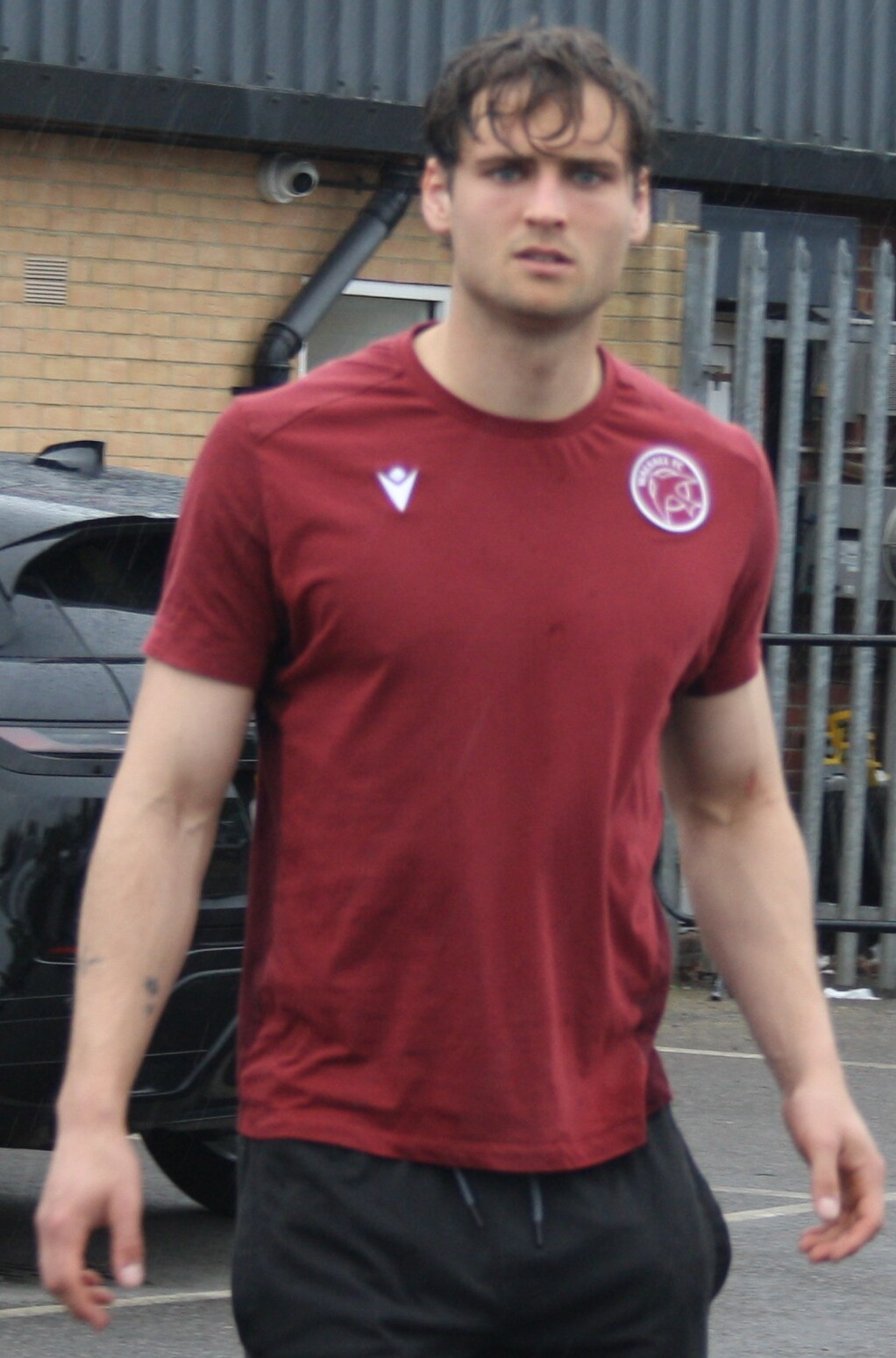
- Pressley while with Walsall in 2026

Personal information
- Full name: Aaron Alex Pressley
- Date of birth: 7 November 2001 (age 25)
- Place of birth: Edinburgh, Scotland
- Height: 1.93 m (6 ft 4 in)
- Position: Forward

Team information
- Current team: Walsall
- Number: 19

Youth career
- –2013: Heart of Midlothian
- 2013–2020: Aston Villa

Senior career*
Years	Team	Apps	(Gls)
2020–2023	Brentford	2	(0)
2021–2022	→ AFC Wimbledon (loan)	21	(2)
2023	→ Accrington Stanley (loan)	22	(6)
2023–2025	Stevenage	25	(2)
2025	→ Barrow (loan)	21	(4)
2025–	Walsall	46	(16)

International career
- Scotland U16
2017–2018	Scotland U17	7	(0)
- * Club domestic league appearances and goals as of 22:56, 31 October 2026 (UTC)

Aaron Alex Pressley (born 7 November 2001) is a Scottish professional footballer who plays as a forward for EFL League Two club Walsall.

Pressley is a product of the Aston Villa and Heart of Midlothian academies and he began his professional career with Brentford in 2020. After failing to break into the first team squad, he transferred to Stevenage in 2023 and Walsall in 2025. Pressley was capped by Scotland at U16 and U17 level.

== Club career ==
=== Brentford ===
==== 2020–2021 ====
After beginning his career in the Heart of Midlothian and Aston Villa academies, Pressley transferred to the B team at Championship club Brentford on 29 January 2020. During what remained of the COVID-19-affected 2019–20 season, he scored three goals in six appearances. As a result of the EFL permitting 9 substitutes to be named in matchday squads partway through the 2020–21 season, Pressley was promoted onto the first team substitutes' bench and was named in 15 matchday squads between November 2020 and February 2021. He made three substitute appearances during the period, but was not involved in Brentford's promotion-winning playoff campaign at the end of the season. Pressley top-scored with 19 goals in 26 B team appearances during the 2020–21 season and was voted the team's Players' Player of the Year. In May 2021, he signed a new two-year contract, with a one-year option.

==== 2021–22 season and AFC Wimbledon loan ====
In July 2021, Pressley joined League One club AFC Wimbledon on loan for the duration of the 2021–22 season. Prior to being sidelined for 9 weeks with a hamstring injury suffered in a mid-December 2021 training match, he had made 25 appearances and scored four goals. As part of his return to fitness, Pressley was named in Brentford B's 2022 Atlantic Cup squad and made one appearance at the tournament. Following his return to the AFC Wimbledon squad in late February 2022, Pressley made two substitute appearances before suffering a reoccurrence of the injury, which ended his season and he returned to Brentford for surgery and rehabilitation. In his absence, the Dons were relegated to League Two.

==== 2022–2023 and Accrington Stanley loan ====
Pressley returned to match play with the B team in mid-November 2022 and on 4 January 2023, he joined League One club Accrington Stanley on loan until the end of the 2022–23 season. On his second appearance, Pressley's two goals and performance in a EFL Trophy quarter-final penalty shoot-out win over Lincoln City saw him win the competition's Player of the Round award. He ended his spell with 27 appearances and eight goals, but was unable to prevent the club's relegation to League Two.

The one-year option on Pressley's Brentford contract was exercised at the end of the 2022–23 season. During the 2023–24 pre-season, he was included in the first team's 2023 Premier League Summer Series squad and made a substitute appearance in the opening match versus Fulham. On 2 August 2023, Pressley departed the club.

=== Stevenage ===
On 2 August 2023, Pressley transferred to League One club Stevenage and signed a two-year contract, with a one-year option, for a compensation fee. During a 2023–24 season in which he missed three months due to injury, he made 25 appearances and scored four goals. An ankle injury resulting from an "accidental collision" during a 2024–25 pre-season friendly led to Pressley undergoing surgery. He returned to match play on 19 October 2024 and made seven appearances before joining League Two club Barrow on loan for the remainder of the season on 9 January 2025. Pressley ended the 2024–25 season with four goals in 21 appearances and was retained by Stevenage for 2025–26. Pressley transferred away from the club in June 2025 and ended his two seasons at Broadhall Way with 32 appearances and four goals.

=== Walsall ===
On 26 June 2025, Pressley transferred to League Two club Walsall and signed a three-year contract for an undisclosed fee. He made 41 appearances and scored seven goals during a mid-table 2025–26 season.

== International career ==
Pressley was capped by Scotland at U16 and U17 level. In November 2021, he won his maiden U21 call up for a pair of 2023 European U21 Championship qualifiers and remained an unused substitute in both matches.

== Personal life ==
Pressley is the son of footballer and manager Steven Pressley and the older Pressley worked with his son in the role of Head of Individual Development at Brentford. Pressley walked out with his father as a Heart of Midlothian mascot at the 2006 Scottish Cup Final. He attended Cramond Primary School and Princethorpe College. As of February 2021, Pressley was living in Richmond. When Pressley's former Aston Villa academy teammate Charlie Farr transferred to Brentford early in the 2022–23 season, he roomed with Pressley.

== Career statistics ==
As of match played 31 October 2026

Appearances and goals by club, season and competition
Club	Season	League			FA Cup		EFL Cup		Other		Total	
Club	Season	Division	Apps	Goals	Apps	Goals	Apps	Goals	Apps	Goals	Apps	Goals
Aston Villa U21	2019–20	—							0	0	0	0
Brentford	2020–21	Championship	2	0	1	0	0	0	0	0	3	0
AFC Wimbledon (loan)	2021–22	League One	21	2	2	0	3	0	1 (Note: Appearance(s) in EFL Trophy)	2	27	4
Accrington Stanley (loan)	2022–23	League One	22	6	3	0	—		2	2	27	8
Stevenage	2023–24	League One	21	2	2	0	1	0	1	2	25	4
Stevenage	2024–25	League One	4	0	1	0	0	0	2	0	7	0
Stevenage	Total		25	2	3	0	1	0	3	2	32	4
Barrow (loan)	2024–25	League Two	21	4	—		—		—		21	4
Walsall	2025–26	League Two	39	7	2	0	0	0	0	0	41	7
Walsall	2026–27	League Two	12	9	0	0	2	1	0	0	15	10
Walsall	Total		51	16	2	0	2	1	0	0	56	17
Career total			142	30	11	0	6	1	6	6	166	37

== Honours ==
- Brentford B Players' Player of the Year: 2020–21
