= Stefan Mols =

Spanish footballer

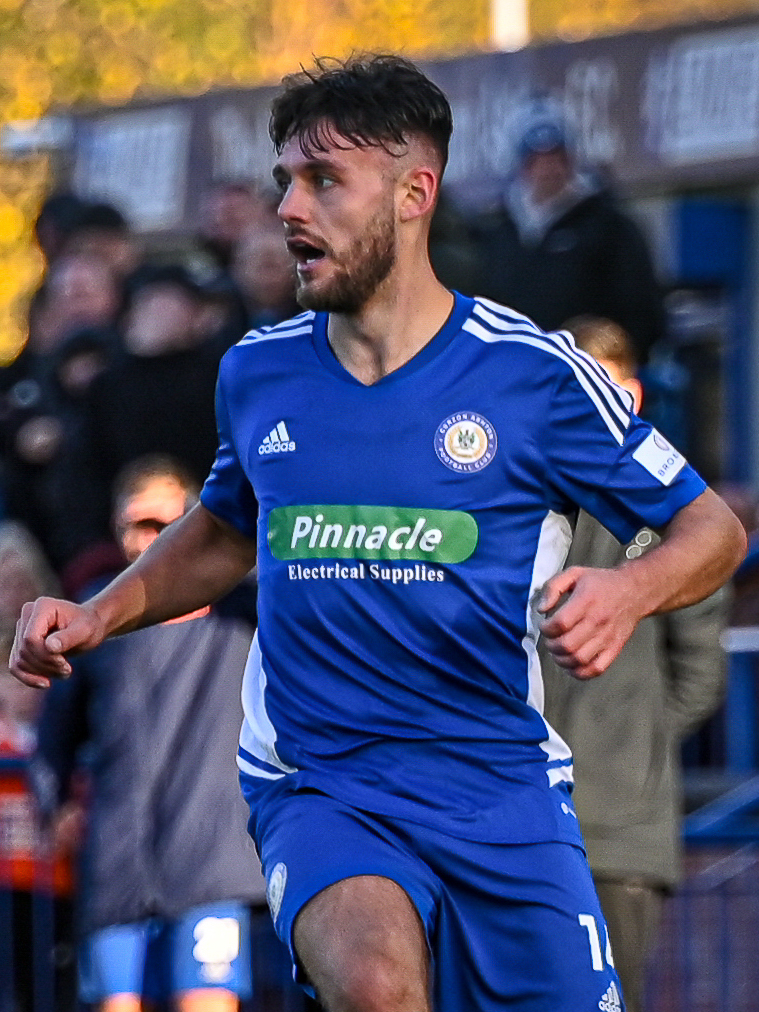
- Stefan Mols in 2023

Personal information
- Full name: Stefan Edouard Mols
- Date of birth: 31 January 1999 (age 27)
- Place of birth: Marbella, Spain
- Height: 5 ft 10 in (1.78 m)
- Position: Midfielder

Team information
- Current team: Accrington Stanley
- Number: 14

Youth career
- –2017: Blackburn Rovers

Senior career*
Years	Team	Apps	(Gls)
2017–2021	Blackburn Rovers	0	(0)
2020–2021	→ Intercity (loan)	1	(0)
2021–2023	Warrington Town	53	(10)
2023–2025	Curzon Ashton	77	(23)
2025–2026	Tamworth	42	(10)
2026–	Accrington Stanley	0	(0)
- * Club domestic league appearances and goals as of 19:42, 29 June 2026 (UTC)

Stefan Edouard Mols (born 31 January 1999) is a Spanish professional footballer who plays as a midfielder for EFL League Two club Accrington Stanley.

== Club career ==
=== Blackburn Rovers ===
In January 2017, Mols signed a two-and-a-half year professional contract with Blackburn Rovers.

On 4 October 2017, Mols made his professional debut for Blackburn Rovers in their EFL Trophy tie against Bury, replacing Craig Conway in the 1-0 defeat.

On 6 October 2020, Mols joined Spanish fourth-tier club Intercity on loan until end of the season. On 22 January 2021, he was recalled to Rovers. After returning, he trialled with Burnley U23.

Mols was released by Rovers at the end of the 2020–21 season at the expiration of his contract with the club.

=== Warrington Town ===
On 12 October 2021, Mols joined Northern Premier League Premier Division club Warrington Town. He signed a new one-year deal in July 2022.

=== Curzon Ashton ===
Mols signed for fellow National League North side Curzon Ashton on 20 June 2023.

=== Tamworth ===
On 11 July 2025, Mols signed for National League side Tamworth.

=== Accrington Stanley ===
On 26 June 2026, Mols signed for EFL League Two side Accrington Stanley.

== Career statistics ==
As of match played 2 September 2025

Appearances and goals by club, season and competition
Club	Season	League			FA Cup		League Cup		Other		Total	
Club	Season	Division	Apps	Goals	Apps	Goals	Apps	Goals	Apps	Goals	Apps	Goals
Blackburn Rovers	2017–18	League One	0	0	0	0	0	0	1 (Note: Appearance in EFL Trophy)	0	1	0
Intercity (loan)	2020–21	Tercera División	1	0	—		—		—		1	0
Warrington Town	2021–22	NPL Premier Division	21	4	0	0	—		5 (Note: Three appearances, one goal in FA Trophy; one appearance, one goal in Cheshire Senior Cup; one appearance in Northern Premier League play-offs)	2	26	6
Warrington Town	2022–23	NPL Premier Division	32	6	4	0	—		4 (Note: One appearance in Cheshire Senior Cup; two appearances in FA Trophy; one appearance in Northern Premier League Premier Division play-offs)	0	40	6
Warrington Town	Total		53	10	4	0	—		9	2	66	12
Curzon Ashton	2023–24	National League North	44	11	2	0	—		3 (Note: Two appearances, one goal in FA Trophy; one appearance in National League North play-offs)	1	49	12
Curzon Ashton	2024–25	National League North	33	12	2	0	—		1 (Note: Appearance in FA Trophy)	0	36	12
Curzon Ashton	Total		77	23	4	0	—		4	1	85	24
Tamworth	2025–26	National League	6	0	0	0	—		0	0	6	0
Career total			137	33	8	0	0	0	14	3	159	36
