= Elicha Ahui =

English footballer (born 2003)

Personal information
- Full name: Elicha Sar-Shalom Ahui
- Date of birth: 28 December 2003 (age 22)
- Place of birth: Nottingham, England
- Height: 6 ft 2 in (1.87 m)
- Position: Defender

Team information
- Current team: Walsall
- Number: 22

Youth career
- Nottingham Forest
- –2022: Lincoln City

Senior career*
Years	Team	Apps	(Gls)
2022–2024	Lincoln City	0	(0)
2022	→ Gainsborough Trinity (loan)	20	(1)
2023	→ Drogheda United (loan)	20	(1)
2023–2024	→ Ayr United (loan)	12	(0)
2024	→ Peterborough Sports (loan)	15	(0)
2024	Drogheda United	13	(1)
2025–	Walsall	12	(0)
2025	→ Drogheda United (loan)	8	(1)
- * Club domestic league appearances and goals as of 08:33, 7 June 2025 (UTC)

Elicha Sar-Shalom Ahui (born 28 December 2003) is an English professional footballer who plays as a defender for EFL League Two club Walsall.

== Club career ==
=== Lincoln City ===
Ahui was released by Nottingham Forest at the age of 16 and joined Lincoln City on the club's Shadow Scholar programme, which would see him sign his first professional contract with Lincoln City on 21 March 2022. He would have a loan spell with local side Gainsborough Trinity making his debut against Hyde United on 21 December 2021. The following season he would make his Lincoln City debut against Newcastle United U21, starting the game in the EFL Trophy on 18 October 2022.

Following the end of the 2023–24 season, the club confirmed there was an option in his contract which they were exploring.

==== Loan spells ====
On 31 January 2023, he joined Drogheda United on loan for the season, with teammate Freddie Draper. His first and only Drogheda goal came on 7 April, the winner in a shock 1–0 away win over Derry City, in which the Drogs played with 10 men. On 26 June, it was confirmed that Ahui and teammate Draper would return to Lincoln City following the completion of their loans on 30 June.

On 3 August 2023, Ahui joined Scottish Championship club Ayr United on a loan until the end of the season.

On 1 February 2024, he was recalled from his loan spell at Ayr United and sent on loan to Peterborough Sports for the remainder of the season.

=== Drogheda United ===
On 30 June 2024, Drogheda announced Ahui had returned on a deal until the end of the 2024 season. Ahui played in Drogheda's successful 2024 FAI Cup final on 10 November, his first senior honour.

=== Walsall ===
On 15 January 2025, Walsall announced the signing of Ahui on an 18-month deal with an optional year extension. He was subsequently loaned back to Drogheda for the next 12 months. He made just 8 appearances in his 2025 loan spell back at Drogheda, scoring 1 goal in a season hampered by injury. After returning from his long term injury, Ahui made his Walsall debut on 6 August 2026, in a 1–0 win away to Bristol City in the EFL Cup.

== Career statistics ==
As of match played on 6 August 2026

Appearances and goals by club, season and competition
Club	Season	League			National Cup		League Cup		Other		Total	
Club	Season	Division	Apps	Goals	Apps	Goals	Apps	Goals	Apps	Goals	Apps	Goals
Lincoln City	2021–22	League One	0	0	0	0	0	0	0	0	0	0
Lincoln City	2022–23	League One	0	0	0	0	0	0	1 (Note: Appearance(s) in the EFL Trophy)	0	1	0
Lincoln City	2023–24	League One	0	0	–		–		–		0	0
Lincoln City	Total		0	0	0	0	0	0	1	0	1	0
Gainsborough Trinity (loan)	2021–22	Northern Premier League	20	1	0	0	–		0	0	20	1
Drogheda United (loan)	2023	LOI Premier Division	20	1	–		–		1 (Note: Appearance(s) in the Leinster Senior Cup)	0	21	1
Ayr United (loan)	2023–24	Scottish Championship	12	0	0	0	1	0	1 (Note: Appearance(s) in the Scottish Challenge Cup)	0	14	0
Peterborough Sports (loan)	2023–24	National League North	15	0	0	0	—		2 (Note: Appearance(s) in the FA Trophy)	0	17	0
Drogheda United	2024	LOI Premier Division	13	1	4	0	–		2 (Note: 1 appearance in the Leinster Senior Cup & 1 appearance in the 2024 League of Ireland Premier Division Promotion/Relegation Playoff)	0	19	1
Walsall	2024–25	League Two	0	0	–		–		–		0	0
Walsall	2025–26	League Two	0	0	0	0	–		–		0	0
Walsall	2026–27	League Two	12	0	0	0	1	0	1	0	1	0
Walsall	Total		12	0	0	0	1	0	1	0	14	0
Drogheda United (loan)	2025	LOI Premier Division	8	1	0	0	–		0	0	8	1
Career total			100	5	4	0	2	0	8	0	115	4

== Honours ==
Drogheda United

- FAI Cup: 2024
