= List of English football transfers summer 2025 =

The 2025 English football summer transfer window ran from 1 to 10 June (due to an exceptional registration period mandated by FIFA for the Club World Cup), and then between 16 June and 1 September 2025. Players without a club could be signed at any time, clubs could sign players on loan dependent on their league's regulations, and clubs could sign a goalkeeper on an emergency loan if they had no registered senior goalkeeper available. This list includes transfers featuring at least one club from either the Premier League or the EFL that were completed after the end of the winter 2024–25 transfer window on 4 February 2025 and before the end of the 2025 summer window.

== Transfers ==
All players and clubs without a flag are English. While Swansea City and Wrexham (Championship), Cardiff City (League One), and Newport County (League Two) are affiliated with the Football Association of Wales and thus take the Welsh flag, they each play in an English league, and so their transfers are included here.

| Date | Player | Moving from | Moving to | Fee |
|---|---|---|---|---|
| 4 February 2025 | Emmanuel Latte Lath | Middlesbrough | Atlanta United | £22.5m |
| 4 February 2025 | Harry McKirdy | Unattached | Bromley | Free |
| 6 February 2025 | Ryō Hatsuse | Unattached | Sheffield Wednesday | Free |
| 6 February 2025 | Willian | Unattached | Fulham | Free |
| 7 February 2025 | Conor Grant | Unattached | Accrington Stanley | Free |
| 11 February 2025 | Matthew Dennis | Unattached | Carlisle United | Free |
| 13 February 2025 | Jonathan Lewis | Unattached | Barnsley | Free |
| 14 February 2025 | Jamie Paterson | Unattached | Coventry City | Free |
| 20 February 2025 | Anthony Forde | Unattached | Burton Albion | Free |
| 20 February 2025 | Kemar Roofe | Unattached | Derby County | Free |
| 20 February 2025 | David Wheeler | Unattached | Shrewsbury Town | Free |
| 21 February 2025 | Louie Watson | Unattached | Crawley Town | Free |
| 28 February 2025 | Jack Stretton | Unattached | Burton Albion | Free |
| 3 March 2025 | Tom Carroll | Unattached | Reading | Free |
| 3 March 2025 | Scott Malone | Unattached | Cambridge United | Free |
| 7 March 2025 | Jeff Hendrick | Unattached | Derby County | Free |
| 7 March 2025 | Alexander Milošević | Unattached | Portsmouth | Free |
| 8 March 2025 | Dom Dwyer | Unattached | Mansfield Town | Free |
| 9 March 2025 | Jewison Bennette | Sunderland | LNZ Cherkasy | Undisclosed |
| 11 March 2025 | Duane Holmes | Preston North End | Houston Dynamo | Free |
| 12 March 2025 | Rento Takaoka | Nissho Gakuen High School | Southampton | Free |
| 22 March 2025 | Dean Bouzanis | Unattached | Charlton Athletic | Free |
| 28 March 2025 | Erik Pieters | Unattached | Derby County | Free |
| 31 March 2025 | Tyler Miller | Unattached | Notts County | Free |
| 11 April 2025 | Jonathan Bond | Watford | Houston Dynamo | Undisclosed |
| 29 May 2025 | Reece Brown | Unattached | Crawley Town | Free |
| 1 June 2025 | Carlos Alcaraz | Flamengo | Everton | £12.6m |
| 1 June 2025 | Trent Alexander-Arnold | Liverpool | Real Madrid | £8.4m |
| 1 June 2025 | Jaidon Anthony | Bournemouth | Burnley | Undisclosed |
| 1 June 2025 | Matheus Cunha | Wolverhampton Wanderers | Manchester United | £62.5m |
| 1 June 2025 | Kevin Danso | Lens | Tottenham Hotspur | £21m |
| 1 June 2025 | Marcus Edwards | Sporting CP | Burnley | Undisclosed |
| 1 June 2025 | Zian Flemming | Millwall | Burnley | £7m |
| 1 June 2025 | Jeremie Frimpong | Bayer Leverkusen | Liverpool | £29.5m |
| 1 June 2025 | Yū Hirakawa | Machida Zelvia | Bristol City | Undisclosed |
| 1 June 2025 | Pierre-Emile Højbjerg | Tottenham Hotspur | Marseille | £17m |
| 1 June 2025 | Dean Huijsen | Bournemouth | Real Madrid | £50m |
| 1 June 2025 | Michael Kayode | Fiorentina | Brentford | Undisclosed |
| 1 June 2025 | Rasmus Kristensen | Leeds United | Eintracht Frankfurt | £7.6m |
| 1 June 2025 | Regan Linney | Altrincham | Carlisle United | Undisclosed |
| 1 June 2025 | Kyrell Lisbie | Braintree Town | Peterborough United | Undisclosed |
| 1 June 2025 | Giorgi Mamardashvili | Valencia | Liverpool | £29m |
| 1 June 2025 | Yasin Özcan | Kasımpaşa | Aston Villa | £5.83m |
| 1 June 2025 | Seb Palmer-Houlden | Bristol City | Gillingham | Undisclosed |
| 1 June 2025 | Mike Penders | Genk | Chelsea | £17m |
| 1 June 2025 | Jack Perkins | Nottingham Forest | Northampton Town | Undisclosed |
| 1 June 2025 | Joshua Quarshie | TSG Hoffenheim | Southampton | £3.5m |
| 1 June 2025 | Alfons Sampsted | Twente | Birmingham City | Undisclosed |
| 1 June 2025 | Luka Vušković | Hajduk Split | Tottenham Hotspur | Undisclosed |
| 1 June 2025 | Bobby Wales | Kilmarnock | Swansea City | Undisclosed |
| 1 June 2025 | Tom Watson | Sunderland | Brighton & Hove Albion | £10m |
| 1 June 2025 | Jacob Wright | Manchester City | Norwich City | £2.3m |
| 2 June 2025 | Lewis Cass | Grimsby Town | Harrogate Town | Free |
| 2 June 2025 | Romelle Donovan | Birmingham City | Brentford | Undisclosed |
| 2 June 2025 | Dário Essugo | Sporting CP | Chelsea | £18m |
| 2 June 2025 | Ben Knight | Unattached | Cambridge United | Free |
| 3 June 2025 | Ethan Bristow | Unattached | Tranmere Rovers | Free |
| 3 June 2025 | Mark Flekken | Brentford | Bayer Leverkusen | £11m |
| 3 June 2025 | Caoimhín Kelleher | Liverpool | Brentford | £12.5m |
| 4 June 2025 | Liam Delap | Ipswich Town | Chelsea | £30m |
| 4 June 2025 | Bradley Ibrahim | Hertha BSC | Plymouth Argyle | Undisclosed |
| 5 June 2025 | Kallum Cesay | Wealdstone | Salford City | Undisclosed |
| 5 June 2025 | Nuno Tavares | Arsenal | Lazio | Undisclosed |
| 6 June 2025 | Daniel Grimshaw | Plymouth Argyle | Norwich City | Undisclosed |
| 6 June 2025 | Jorginho | Arsenal | Flamengo | Undisclosed |
| 6 June 2025 | Lloyd Kelly | Newcastle United | Juventus | £20m |
| 6 June 2025 | Thierry Small | Charlton Athletic | Preston North End | Undisclosed |
| 7 June 2025 | Ármin Pécsi | Puskás Akadémia | Liverpool | Undisclosed |
| 7 June 2025 | Sorba Thomas | Huddersfield Town | Stoke City | Undisclosed |
| 9 June 2025 | Rayan Aït-Nouri | Wolverhampton Wanderers | Manchester City | £31m |
| 9 June 2025 | Saxon Earley | Plymouth Argyle | Stevenage | Undisclosed |
| 9 June 2025 | Marquinhos | Arsenal | Cruzeiro | Undisclosed |
| 9 June 2025 | Mamadou Sarr | Strasbourg | Chelsea | £12m |
| 10 June 2025 | Jobe Bellingham | Sunderland | Borussia Dortmund | £27.8m |
| 10 June 2025 | Marcus Bettinelli | Chelsea | Manchester City | Undisclosed |
| 10 June 2025 | Chem Campbell | Wolverhampton Wanderers | Stevenage | Undisclosed |
| 10 June 2025 | Rayan Cherki | Lyon | Manchester City | £30m |
| 10 June 2025 | Dion De Neve | Kortrijk | Blackburn Rovers | Undisclosed |
| 10 June 2025 | Declan Frith | Thun | Peterborough United | Undisclosed |
| 10 June 2025 | Tijjani Reijnders | Milan | Manchester City | £46.5m |
| 15 June 2025 | Roland Idowu | Shrewsbury Town | St Mirren | Undisclosed |
| 16 June 2025 | Harrison Burke | Chester | Walsall | Undisclosed |
| 16 June 2025 | Ryan Hardie | Plymouth Argyle | Wrexham | Undisclosed |
| 16 June 2025 | Rushian Hepburn-Murphy | Crawley Town | Milton Keynes Dons | Undisclosed |
| 16 June 2025 | Reda Laalaoui | FUS Rabat | Hull City | Undisclosed |
| 16 June 2025 | Toby Mullarkey | Crawley Town | Fleetwood Town | Undisclosed |
| 16 June 2025 | Xavier Simons | Hull City | Bolton Wanderers | Undisclosed |
| 16 June 2025 | Mathys Tel | Bayern Munich | Tottenham Hotspur | £30m |
| 16 June 2025 | Adrien Truffert | Rennes | Bournemouth | £14.4m |
| 16 June 2025 | Ehije Ukaki | Botev Plovdiv | Sheffield United | Undisclosed |
| 16 June 2025 | Charlie Warren | Felixstowe & Walton United | Bolton Wanderers | Undisclosed |
| 17 June 2025 | Diego Coppola | Hellas Verona | Brighton & Hove Albion | Undisclosed |
| 17 June 2025 | Will Davies | Sutton United | Fleetwood Town | Undisclosed |
| 17 June 2025 | Mykola Kukharevych | Swansea City | Slovan Bratislava | Undisclosed |
| 18 June 2025 | Adrian Segecic | Sydney | Portsmouth | Undisclosed |
| 19 June 2025 | Aaron Collins | Bolton Wanderers | Milton Keynes Dons | Undisclosed |
| 19 June 2025 | Christian Saydee | Portsmouth | Wigan Athletic | Undisclosed |
| 19 June 2025 | Francisco Sierralta | Watford | Auxerre | Undisclosed |
| 20 June 2025 | Zach Hemming | Middlesbrough | Chesterfield | Undisclosed |
| 20 June 2025 | Fer López | Celta Vigo | Wolverhampton Wanderers | £19m |
| 20 June 2025 | Phoenix Patterson | Fleetwood Town | Stevenage | Undisclosed |
| 20 June 2025 | Junior Quitirna | Crawley Town | Wycombe Wanderers | Undisclosed |
| 20 June 2025 | Adam Randell | Plymouth Argyle | Bristol City | Undisclosed |
| 20 June 2025 | Sidnei Tavares | Moreirense | Blackburn Rovers | Undisclosed |
| 20 June 2025 | Florian Wirtz | Bayer Leverkusen | Liverpool | £100m |
| 23 June 2025 | Jaka Bijol | Udinese | Leeds United | Undisclosed |
| 23 June 2025 | Lee Jenkins | Haverfordwest County | Newport County | Undisclosed |
| 23 June 2025 | Jack Sparkes | Peterborough United | Bristol Rovers | Undisclosed |
| 23 June 2025 | Nat Phillips | Liverpool | West Bromwich Albion | Undisclosed |
| 24 June 2025 | Seán Grehan | Crystal Palace | Doncaster Rovers | Undisclosed |
| 24 June 2025 | Sam Hughes | Stockport County | Peterborough United | Undisclosed |
| 24 June 2025 | Brandon Khela | Birmingham City | Peterborough United | Undisclosed |
| 24 June 2025 | Andrew Omobamidele | Nottingham Forest | Strasbourg | Undisclosed |
| 25 June 2025 | Jake Beesley | Blackpool | Burton Albion | Undisclosed |
| 25 June 2025 | Niall Ennis | Stoke City | Blackpool | Undisclosed |
| 25 June 2025 | Cameron Humphreys | Rotherham United | Port Vale | Undisclosed |
| 25 June 2025 | Jakov Medić | Ajax | Norwich City | Undisclosed |
| 25 June 2025 | Anthony Racioppi | Hull City | Sion | Undisclosed |
| 25 June 2025 | Max Weiß | Karlsruher SC | Burnley | £4.3m |
| 25 June 2025 | Ayumu Yokoyama | Birmingham City | Genk | Undisclosed |
| 26 June 2025 | Taylor Allen | Walsall | Wycombe Wanderers | Undisclosed |
| 26 June 2025 | Jay Bird | Exeter City | Salford City | Undisclosed |
| 26 June 2025 | Will Boyle | Wrexham | Shrewsbury Town | Undisclosed |
| 26 June 2025 | Josh Coburn | Middlesbrough | Millwall | Undisclosed |
| 26 June 2025 | Dara Costelloe | Burnley | Wigan Athletic | Undisclosed |
| 26 June 2025 | Quilindschy Hartman | Feyenoord | Burnley | Undisclosed |
| 26 June 2025 | Milos Kerkez | Bournemouth | Liverpool | £40m |
| 26 June 2025 | Vladan Kovačević | Sporting CP | Norwich City | Undisclosed |
| 26 June 2025 | Carlton Morris | Luton Town | Derby County | Undisclosed |
| 26 June 2025 | Aaron Pressley | Stevenage | Walsall | Undisclosed |
| 26 June 2025 | Rúben Rodrigues | Oxford United | Vitória | Undisclosed |
| 26 June 2025 | Jayden Wareham | Reading | Exeter City | Undisclosed |
| 27 June 2025 | Kealey Adamson | Macarthur | Queens Park Rangers | Undisclosed |
| 27 June 2025 | Bradley Fink | Basel | Wycombe Wanderers | Undisclosed |
| 27 June 2025 | Daiki Hashioka | Luton Town | Slavia Prague | Undisclosed |
| 27 June 2025 | Nathan Moriah-Welsh | Hibernian | Mansfield Town | Undisclosed |
| 27 June 2025 | Paul Onuachu | Southampton | Trabzonspor | Undisclosed |
| 27 June 2025 | Owen Oseni | St Mirren | Plymouth Argyle | Undisclosed |
| 27 June 2025 | Lewis Shipley | Norwich City | Barrow | Undisclosed |
| 27 June 2025 | Jay Williams | Milton Keynes Dons | Crawley Town | Undisclosed |
| 28 June 2025 | Kwame Poku | Peterborough United | Queens Park Rangers | Undisclosed |
| 28 June 2025 | Will Swan | Crawley Town | Bradford City | Undisclosed |
| 28 June 2025 | Jake Tabor | Amersham Town | Swindon Town | Undisclosed |
| 28 June 2025 | Mikki van Sas | Feyenoord | Wycombe Wanderers | Undisclosed |
| 30 June 2025 | Jordan Amissah | Ross County | Burton Albion | Undisclosed |
| 30 June 2025 | Alex Bass | Notts County | Peterborough United | Undisclosed |
| 30 June 2025 | Lee Bonis | Den Haag | Chesterfield | Undisclosed |
| 30 June 2025 | Reyes Cleary | West Bromwich Albion | Barnsley | Undisclosed |
| 30 June 2025 | Reece Hutchinson | Sligo Rovers | Crewe Alexandra | Undisclosed |
| 30 June 2025 | Callum Osmand | Fulham | Celtic | Undisclosed |
| 1 July 2025 | Dan Agyei | Leyton Orient | Kocaelispor | Free |
| 1 July 2025 | Semi Ajayi | West Bromwich Albion | Hull City | Free |
| 1 July 2025 | Xavier Amaechi | 1. FC Magdeburg | Plymouth Argyle | Free |
| 1 July 2025 | Justin Amaluzor | Altrincham | Grimsby Town | Free |
| 1 July 2025 | Tom Anderson | Doncaster Rovers | Shrewsbury Town | Free |
| 1 July 2025 | Kepa Arrizabalaga | Chelsea | Arsenal | £5m |
| 1 July 2025 | Loick Ayina | Huddersfield Town | Salford City | Free |
| 1 July 2025 | Dominic Ball | Leyton Orient | Cambridge United | Free |
| 1 July 2025 | James Ball | AFC Wimbledon | Swindon Town | Free |
| 1 July 2025 | Danny Batth | Blackburn Rovers | Derby County | Free |
| 1 July 2025 | Nathan Baxter | Bolton Wanderers | Watford | Free |
| 1 July 2025 | Walter Benítez | PSV Eindhoven | Crystal Palace | Free |
| 1 July 2025 | Mason Bennett | Burton Albion | Harrogate Town | Free |
| 1 July 2025 | Nathan Bishop | Sunderland | AFC Wimbledon | Undisclosed |
| 1 July 2025 | Marc Bola | Samsunspor | Watford | Free |
| 1 July 2025 | Sebastiaan Bornauw | VfL Wolfsburg | Leeds United | £5.1m |
| 1 July 2025 | Caolan Boyd-Munce | St Mirren | Wycombe Wanderers | Free |
| 1 July 2025 | Tom Bradbury | Cheltenham Town | Harrogate Town | Free |
| 1 July 2025 | Sonny Bradley | Derby County | Lincoln City | Free |
| 1 July 2025 | Zak Bradshaw | Lincoln City | Cambridge United | Free |
| 1 July 2025 | Miguel Ángel Brau | Granada | Coventry City | Free |
| 1 July 2025 | Patrick Brough | Northampton Town | Tranmere Rovers | Free |
| 1 July 2025 | Cameron Burgess | Ipswich Town | Swansea City | Free |
| 1 July 2025 | Jack Burroughs | Coventry City | Northampton Town | Free |
| 1 July 2025 | Killian Cahill | Brighton & Hove Albion | Leyton Orient | Free |
| 1 July 2025 | Panutche Camará | Crawley Town | Dundee United | Free |
| 1 July 2025 | Innes Cameron | Kilmarnock | Barrow | Free |
| 1 July 2025 | Dean Campbell | Barrow | Northampton Town | Free |
| 1 July 2025 | Ted Cann | West Bromwich Albion | Rotherham United | Free |
| 1 July 2025 | Sonny Carey | Blackpool | Charlton Athletic | Free |
| 1 July 2025 | Dan Casey | Motherwell | Wycombe Wanderers | Free |
| 1 July 2025 | Danny Cashman | Worthing | Crawley Town | Free |
| 1 July 2025 | Courtney Clarke | Eastbourne Borough | Walsall | Undisclosed |
| 1 July 2025 | Sam Clucas | Lincoln City | Shrewsbury Town | Free |
| 1 July 2025 | Will Collar | Stockport County | Milton Keynes Dons | Free |
| 1 July 2025 | Antonio Cordero | Málaga | Newcastle United | Free |
| 1 July 2025 | Romoney Crichlow | Bradford City | Barnet | Free |
| 1 July 2025 | Max Crocombe | Burton Albion | Millwall | Free |
| 1 July 2025 | Robbie Cundy | Notts County | Cheltenham Town | Free |
| 1 July 2025 | Sam Dalby | Wrexham | Bolton Wanderers | Free |
| 1 July 2025 | Donervon Daniels | Walsall | Oldham Athletic | Free |
| 1 July 2025 | Harry Darling | Swansea City | Norwich City | Free |
| 1 July 2025 | Kevin De Bruyne | Manchester City | Napoli | Free |
| 1 July 2025 | Brian De Keersmaecker | Heracles | Oxford United | Undisclosed |
| 1 July 2025 | Matthew Dennis | Carlisle United | Notts County | Free |
| 1 July 2025 | Habib Diarra | Strasbourg | Sunderland | £30m |
| 1 July 2025 | Kane Drummond | Chesterfield | Oldham Athletic | Free |
| 1 July 2025 | Jack Earing | Walsall | Barrow | Free |
| 1 July 2025 | Tayo Edun | Peterborough United | Stockport County | Free |
| 1 July 2025 | CJ Egan-Riley | Burnley | Marseille | Free |
| 1 July 2025 | Jack Evans | FC Halifax Town | Harrogate Town | Free |
| 1 July 2025 | Owen Evans | Cheltenham Town | Barnet | Free |
| 1 July 2025 | Morgan Feeney | Shrewsbury Town | Carlisle United | Free |
| 1 July 2025 | Ross Fitzsimons | Scunthorpe United | Northampton Town | Free |
| 1 July 2025 | Tyrese Fornah | Derby County | Northampton Town | Free |
| 1 July 2025 | Ryan Galvin | FC Halifax Town | Barnet | Free |
| 1 July 2025 | Dominic Gape | Shrewsbury Town | Colchester United | Free |
| 1 July 2025 | Gerard Garner | Barrow | Newport County | Free |
| 1 July 2025 | Liam Gordon | Walsall | Port Vale | Free |
| 1 July 2025 | Robbie Gotts | Barrow | Doncaster Rovers | Free |
| 1 July 2025 | Mason Hancock | Airdrieonians | Walsall | Free |
| 1 July 2025 | Brandon Hanlan | Wycombe Wanderers | Doncaster Rovers | Free |
| 1 July 2025 | Luke Hannant | Gateshead | Oldham Athletic | Free |
| 1 July 2025 | Marcus Harness | Ipswich Town | Huddersfield Town | Free |
| 1 July 2025 | Rekeem Harper | Port Vale | Barrow | Free |
| 1 July 2025 | Vincent Harper | Exeter City | Walsall | Free |
| 1 July 2025 | Oliver Hawkins | Gillingham | Barnet | Free |
| 1 July 2025 | Josh Hawkes | Tranmere Rovers | Oldham Athletic | Free |
| 1 July 2025 | Regan Hendry | Tranmere Rovers | Mansfield Town | Free |
| 1 July 2025 | Scott High | Huddersfield Town | Barnet | Free |
| 1 July 2025 | Will Hondermarck | Northampton Town | Bromley | Free |
| 1 July 2025 | George Honeyman | Millwall | Blackpool | Free |
| 1 July 2025 | Fraser Horsfall | Stockport County | Blackpool | Free |
| 1 July 2025 | Jordan Houghton | Plymouth Argyle | Stevenage | Free |
| 1 July 2025 | Ben Hughes | Swansea City | Cambridge United | Free |
| 1 July 2025 | Denver Hume | Grimsby Town | Fleetwood Town | Free |
| 1 July 2025 | Stephen Humphrys | Barnsley | Bradford City | Free |
| 1 July 2025 | Bashir Humphreys | Chelsea | Burnley | £14m |
| 1 July 2025 | Michael Ihiekwe | Sheffield Wednesday | Blackpool | Free |
| 1 July 2025 | Daniel Iversen | Leicester City | Preston North End | Free |
| 1 July 2025 | Michael Jacobs | Chesterfield | Northampton Town | Free |
| 1 July 2025 | Gethin Jones | Bolton Wanderers | Milton Keynes Dons | Free |
| 1 July 2025 | Ricky-Jade Jones | Peterborough United | FC St. Pauli | Free |
| 1 July 2025 | Jaze Kabia | Truro City | Grimsby Town | Undisclosed |
| 1 July 2025 | Thomas Kaminski | Luton Town | Charlton Athletic | Undisclosed |
| 1 July 2025 | Fiacre Kelleher | Colchester United | Cork City | Free |
| 1 July 2025 | Ollie Kensdale | Eastbourne Borough | Barnet | Free |
| 1 July 2025 | Kaine Kesler-Hayden | Aston Villa | Coventry City | £3.5m |
| 1 July 2025 | Alfie Kilgour | Mansfield Town | Bristol Rovers | Free |
| 1 July 2025 | Kyle Knoyle | Stockport County | Mansfield Town | Free |
| 1 July 2025 | Charalampos Kostoulas | Olympiacos | Brighton & Hove Albion | £29.78m |
| 1 July 2025 | Maziar Kouhyar | York City | Notts County | Free |
| 1 July 2025 | Hector Kyprianou | Peterborough United | Watford | Free |
| 1 July 2025 | Jørgen Strand Larsen | Celta Vigo | Wolverhampton Wanderers | £23m |
| 1 July 2025 | Jordan Lawrence-Gabriel | Blackpool | Port Vale | Free |
| 1 July 2025 | Enzo Le Fée | Roma | Sunderland | £20m |
| 1 July 2025 | Jake Leake | Hull City | Oldham Athletic | Free |
| 1 July 2025 | Ryan Ledson | Preston North End | Huddersfield Town | Free |
| 1 July 2025 | Adam Lewis | Morecambe | Chesterfield | Free |
| 1 July 2025 | Elliott List | Stevenage | Northampton Town | Free |
| 1 July 2025 | Joe Low | Wycombe Wanderers | Huddersfield Town | Free |
| 1 July 2025 | Jason Lowe | Port Vale | Tranmere Rovers | Free |
| 1 July 2025 | Joe Lumley | Southampton | Bristol City | Free |
| 1 July 2025 | Filozofe Mabete | Wolverhampton Wanderers | Swindon Town | Free |
| 1 July 2025 | Jack MacKenzie | Aberdeen | Plymouth Argyle | Free |
| 1 July 2025 | Josh March | Harrogate Town | Crewe Alexandra | Free |
| 1 July 2025 | Dilan Markanday | Blackburn Rovers | Chesterfield | Free |
| 1 July 2025 | Marko Maroši | Cambridge United | Port Vale | Free |
| 1 July 2025 | Amadou Mbengue | Reading | Queens Park Rangers | Free |
| 1 July 2025 | Conor McCarthy | Barnsley | Northampton Town | Free |
| 1 July 2025 | Shawn McCoulsky | Maidenhead United | Harrogate Town | Free |
| 1 July 2025 | Joe McDonnell | Eastleigh | AFC Wimbledon | Free |
| 1 July 2025 | Josh McEachran | Oxford United | Bristol Rovers | Free |
| 1 July 2025 | Oisin McEntee | Walsall | Heart of Midlothian | Free |
| 1 July 2025 | Harry McKirdy | Bromley | Crawley Town | Free |
| 1 July 2025 | Nathaniel Mendez-Laing | Derby County | Milton Keynes Dons | Free |
| 1 July 2025 | Glenn Middleton | Dundee United | Doncaster Rovers | Free |
| 1 July 2025 | Demetri Mitchell | Exeter City | Leyton Orient | Free |
| 1 July 2025 | Kieron Morris | Tranmere Rovers | Oldham Athletic | Free |
| 1 July 2025 | Louie Moulden | Crystal Palace | Norwich City | Free |
| 1 July 2025 | Fraser Murray | Kilmarnock | Wigan Athletic | Free |
| 1 July 2025 | Kal Naismith | Bristol City | Luton Town | Free |
| 1 July 2025 | Josh Neufville | AFC Wimbledon | Bradford City | Free |
| 1 July 2025 | Phil Neumann | Hannover 96 | Birmingham City | Free |
| 1 July 2025 | Tom Nichols | Mansfield Town | Swindon Town | Free |
| 1 July 2025 | Lukas Nmecha | VfL Wolfsburg | Leeds United | Free |
| 1 July 2025 | Oliver Norburn | Blackpool | Notts County | Free |
| 1 July 2025 | Paudie O'Connor | Lincoln City | Reading | Free |
| 1 July 2025 | Darren Oldaker | Chesterfield | Swindon Town | Free |
| 1 July 2025 | Joseph Olowu | Doncaster Rovers | Stockport County | Free |
| 1 July 2025 | Adebola Oluwo | Barnet | Salford City | Free |
| 1 July 2025 | Emmanuel Osadebe | Forest Green Rovers | Barnet | Free |
| 1 July 2025 | Kendry Páez | Independiente del Valle | Chelsea | £17.2m |
| 1 July 2025 | Jamie Paterson | Coventry City | Plymouth Argyle | Free |
| 1 July 2025 | Matty Pearson | Huddersfield Town | Doncaster Rovers | Free |
| 1 July 2025 | Matthew Pennington | Blackpool | Bradford City | Free |
| 1 July 2025 | Tom Pett | Cheltenham Town | Oldham Athletic | Free |
| 1 July 2025 | Dillon Phillips | Rotherham United | Hull City | Free |
| 1 July 2025 | Mitch Pinnock | Northampton Town | Bromley | Free |
| 1 July 2025 | Max Power | AGF | Bradford City | Free |
| 1 July 2025 | Gustavo Puerta | Bayer Leverkusen | Hull City | Free |
| 1 July 2025 | Ben Purrington | Exeter City | Cambridge United | Free |
| 1 July 2025 | Franco Ravizzoli | Wycombe Wanderers | Blackpool | Free |
| 1 July 2025 | Zépiqueno Redmond | Feyenoord | Aston Villa | Free |
| 1 July 2025 | Rico Richards | Aston Villa | Port Vale | Free |
| 1 July 2025 | Emil Riis Jakobsen | Preston North End | Bristol City | Free |
| 1 July 2025 | Liam Roberts | Millwall | Mansfield Town | Free |
| 1 July 2025 | Harry Rodda | Chelsea | Southampton | Free |
| 1 July 2025 | Ricardo Santos | Bolton Wanderers | Swansea City | Free |
| 1 July 2025 | Freddie Sass | King's Lynn Town | Accrington Stanley | Free |
| 1 July 2025 | George Saville | Millwall | Luton Town | Free |
| 1 July 2025 | Adam Senior | FC Halifax Town | Barnet | Free |
| 1 July 2025 | Jordan Shipley | Shrewsbury Town | Port Vale | Free |
| 1 July 2025 | Isaac Sinclair | Curzon Ashton | Accrington Stanley | Free |
| 1 July 2025 | Alistair Smith | Lincoln City | AFC Wimbledon | Free |
| 1 July 2025 | Nathan Smith | Port Vale | Tranmere Rovers | Free |
| 1 July 2025 | Matthew Smith | St Johnstone | Newport County | Free |
| 1 July 2025 | Reece Smith | Maidenhead United | Harrogate Town | Free |
| 1 July 2025 | Scott Smith | Wigan Athletic | Barrow | Free |
| 1 July 2025 | Joe Snowdon | Leeds United | Swindon Town | Free |
| 1 July 2025 | Kian Spence | Barrow | Rotherham United | Free |
| 1 July 2025 | Reece Staunton | Spennymoor Town | Grimsby Town | Free |
| 1 July 2025 | Jack Stevens | Cambridge United | Reading | Free |
| 1 July 2025 | Sam Stubbs | Bradford City | Shrewsbury Town | Free |
| 1 July 2025 | Jayden Sweeney | Leyton Orient | Grimsby Town | Free |
| 1 July 2025 | Ryan Sweeney | Burton Albion | Mansfield Town | Free |
| 1 July 2025 | Kamarai Swyer | West Ham United | Northampton Town | Free |
| 1 July 2025 | Fábio Tavares | Coventry City | Burton Albion | Free |
| 1 July 2025 | Richard Taylor | St Mirren | Bolton Wanderers | Free |
| 1 July 2025 | Jordan Thompson | Stoke City | Preston North End | Free |
| 1 July 2025 | Kieran Tierney | Arsenal | Celtic | Free |
| 1 July 2025 | James Tilley | AFC Wimbledon | Wycombe Wanderers | Free |
| 1 July 2025 | Curtis Tilt | Salford City | Bradford City | Free |
| 1 July 2025 | Jean-Clair Todibo | Nice | West Ham United | £32.8m |
| 1 July 2025 | Ibou Touray | Stockport County | Bradford City | Free |
| 1 July 2025 | Kabongo Tshimanga | Peterborough United | Crawley Town | Free |
| 1 July 2025 | Axel Tuanzebe | Ipswich Town | Burnley | Free |
| 1 July 2025 | Jack Tucker | Milton Keynes Dons | Colchester United | Free |
| 1 July 2025 | Nik Tzanev | Northampton Town | Newport County | Free |
| 1 July 2025 | Pol Valentín | Sheffield Wednesday | Preston North End | Free |
| 1 July 2025 | Sam Vokes | Wycombe Wanderers | Gillingham | Free |
| 1 July 2025 | Ben Waine | Plymouth Argyle | Port Vale | Free |
| 1 July 2025 | Jamie Walker | Bradford City | Grimsby Town | Free |
| 1 July 2025 | Tyler Walker | Lincoln City | Barrow | Free |
| 1 July 2025 | Murray Wallace | Millwall | Huddersfield Town | Free |
| 1 July 2025 | Danny Ward | Leicester City | Wrexham | Free |
| 1 July 2025 | Caleb Watts | Exeter City | Plymouth Argyle | Free |
| 1 July 2025 | Andreas Weimann | Blackburn Rovers | Derby County | Free |
| 1 July 2025 | Charlie Whitaker | Notts County | Tranmere Rovers | Free |
| 1 July 2025 | Dylan Williams | Chelsea | Burton Albion | Undisclosed |
| 1 July 2025 | Jaden Williams | Tottenham Hotspur | Colchester United | Free |
| 1 July 2025 | Ben Winterbottom | Brentford | Barrow | Free |
| 1 July 2025 | Luca Woodhouse | Wycombe Wanderers | Exeter City | Free |
| 1 July 2025 | Joe Wright | Kilmarnock | Bradford City | Free |
| 1 July 2025 | Jordan Wright | Grimsby Town | Newport County | Free |
| 1 July 2025 | Yoon Do-young | Daejeon Hana Citizen | Brighton & Hove Albion | Undisclosed |
| 1 July 2025 | Brad Young | Leicester City | Bristol Rovers | Free |
| 2 July 2025 | Valentín Barco | Brighton & Hove Albion | Strasbourg | Undisclosed |
| 2 July 2025 | Olivier Boscagli | PSV Eindhoven | Brighton & Hove Albion | Free |
| 2 July 2025 | Jack Bray | Harrogate Town | West Bromwich Albion | Undisclosed |
| 2 July 2025 | Emmanuel Fernandez | Peterborough United | Rangers | Undisclosed |
| 2 July 2025 | Zak Gilsenan | Blackburn Rovers | Grimsby Town | Free |
| 2 July 2025 | Nohan Kenneh | Hibernian | Tranmere Rovers | Free |
| 2 July 2025 | Malik Mothersille | Peterborough United | Stockport County | Undisclosed |
| 2 July 2025 | Isaac Olaofe | Stockport County | Charlton Athletic | Undisclosed |
| 2 July 2025 | João Pedro | Brighton & Hove Albion | Chelsea | £55m |
| 2 July 2025 | Jarell Quansah | Liverpool | Bayer Leverkusen | £35m |
| 2 July 2025 | Joe Rothwell | Bournemouth | Rangers | Undisclosed |
| 2 July 2025 | Kamaldeen Sulemana | Southampton | Atalanta | £18m |
| 2 July 2025 | Loum Tchaouna | Lazio | Burnley | £13m |
| 3 July 2025 | Christopher Atherton | Glenavon | Chelsea | Undisclosed |
| 3 July 2025 | Demarai Gray | Al-Ettifaq | Birmingham City | Undisclosed |
| 3 July 2025 | Antoni Milambo | Feyenoord | Brentford | £16m |
| 3 July 2025 | Lewis Ward | AFC Wimbledon | Swindon Town | Free |
| 4 July 2025 | Amari'i Bell | Luton Town | Charlton Athletic | Free |
| 4 July 2025 | Kian Best | Preston North End | Chelsea | Free |
| 4 July 2025 | Luke Campbell | Chelsea | Nottingham Forest | Free |
| 4 July 2025 | Philippe Coutinho | Aston Villa | Vasco da Gama | Undisclosed |
| 4 July 2025 | Michael Craig | Reading | Leyton Orient | Undisclosed |
| 4 July 2025 | Louis Flower | Brighton & Hove Albion | Crawley Town | Free |
| 4 July 2025 | Ethan Galbraith | Leyton Orient | Swansea City | £1.5m |
| 4 July 2025 | Thierry Gale | Rapid Vienna | Bolton Wanderers | Undisclosed |
| 4 July 2025 | Callum O'Dowda | Cardiff City | Ferencváros | Undisclosed |
| 4 July 2025 | Bright Osayi-Samuel | Fenerbahçe | Birmingham City | Free |
| 4 July 2025 | Aribim Pepple | Luton Town | Plymouth Argyle | Undisclosed |
| 4 July 2025 | Dion Pereira | Luton Town | Crawley Town | Free |
| 4 July 2025 | Aaron Ramsey | Cardiff City | Pumas UNAM | Free |
| 4 July 2025 | Noah Sadiki | Union Saint-Gilloise | Sunderland | £15m |
| 4 July 2025 | Brendan Sarpong-Wiredu | Fleetwood Town | Plymouth Argyle | Undisclosed |
| 4 July 2025 | Benjamin Tanimu | Crawley Town | Maghreb of Fez | Undisclosed |
| 5 July 2025 | Maxim De Cuyper | Club Brugge | Brighton & Hove Albion | £17.5m |
| 5 July 2025 | Kyōgo Furuhashi | Rennes | Birmingham City | Undisclosed |
| 5 July 2025 | Jamie Gittens | Borussia Dortmund | Chelsea | £48.5m |
| 5 July 2025 | Igor Jesus | Botafogo | Nottingham Forest | £10m |
| 5 July 2025 | Diego León | Cerro Porteño | Manchester United | Undisclosed |
| 5 July 2025 | Odeluga Offiah | Brighton & Hove Albion | Preston North End | Undisclosed |
| 5 July 2025 | Jake Richards | Exeter City | Luton Town | Undisclosed |
| 5 July 2025 | Vivaldo Semedo | Udinese | Watford | Undisclosed |
| 5 July 2025 | Vinícius Souza | Sheffield United | VfL Wolfsburg | Undisclosed |
| 5 July 2025 | Maksym Talovierov | Plymouth Argyle | Stoke City | Undisclosed |
| 5 July 2025 | Kyle Walker | Manchester City | Burnley | £5m |
| 6 July 2025 | Kanya Fujimoto | Gil Vicente | Birmingham City | Free |
| 6 July 2025 | Luke Southwood | Bolton Wanderers | Bristol Rovers | Undisclosed |
| 6 July 2025 | Martín Zubimendi | Real Sociedad | Arsenal | £60m |
| 7 July 2025 | Aaron Connolly | Millwall | Leyton Orient | Free |
| 7 July 2025 | Aune Heggebø | Brann | West Bromwich Albion | Undisclosed |
| 7 July 2025 | Jack Stevens | Solihull Moors | Oldham Athletic | Undisclosed |
| 7 July 2025 | Ryley Towler | Portsmouth | Lincoln City | Undisclosed |
| 8 July 2025 | Ayman Benarous | Bristol City | Plymouth Argyle | Free |
| 8 July 2025 | Jordan Brown | Leyton Orient | Blackpool | Undisclosed |
| 8 July 2025 | Andre Green | Rotherham United | Panserraikos | Free |
| 8 July 2025 | Gabriel Gudmundsson | Lille | Leeds United | £10m |
| 8 July 2025 | Ryan Howley | Coventry City | Bristol Rovers | Free |
| 8 July 2025 | Mathias Kvistgaarden | Brøndby | Norwich City | £6.9m |
| 8 July 2025 | Reinildo Mandava | Atlético Madrid | Sunderland | Free |
| 8 July 2025 | Robin Olsen | Aston Villa | Malmö FF | Free |
| 8 July 2025 | Kōta Takai | Kawasaki Frontale | Tottenham Hotspur | £5m |
| 9 July 2025 | Thierno Barry | Villarreal | Everton | £27m |
| 9 July 2025 | Reece Burke | Luton Town | Charlton Athletic | Undisclosed |
| 9 July 2025 | Damion Downs | 1. FC Köln | Southampton | £7m |
| 9 July 2025 | David McGoldrick | Notts County | Barnsley | Free |
| 9 July 2025 | Ben Perry | Nottingham Forest | Colchester United | Undisclosed |
| 9 July 2025 | Christy Pym | Mansfield Town | Grimsby Town | Free |
| 9 July 2025 | Ramón Sosa | Nottingham Forest | Palmeiras | £10m |
| 9 July 2025 | Chemsdine Talbi | Club Brugge | Sunderland | £18m |
| 9 July 2025 | Jack Whatmough | Preston North End | Huddersfield Town | Undisclosed |
| 10 July 2025 | Simon Adingra | Brighton & Hove Albion | Sunderland | £21m |
| 10 July 2025 | Ryan Alebiosu | Kortrijk | Blackburn Rovers | Undisclosed |
| 10 July 2025 | Jonson Clarke-Harris | Rotherham United | Pendikspor | Free |
| 10 July 2025 | Aaron Cresswell | West Ham United | Stoke City | Free |
| 10 July 2025 | Jake Eastwood | Grimsby Town | Cambridge United | Free |
| 10 July 2025 | Jorge Grant | Heart of Midlothian | Salford City | Free |
| 10 July 2025 | Mohammed Kudus | West Ham United | Tottenham Hotspur | £55m |
| 10 July 2025 | Christian Nørgaard | Brentford | Arsenal | £10m |
| 10 July 2025 | Hakeem Odoffin | Rotherham United | Luton Town | Free |
| 10 July 2025 | Toby Sibbick | Wigan Athletic | Burton Albion | Undisclosed |
| 10 July 2025 | Brodie Spencer | Huddersfield Town | Oxford United | Undisclosed |
| 10 July 2025 | Nahki Wells | Bristol City | Luton Town | Free |
| 10 July 2025 | Mallik Wilks | Sheffield Wednesday | Pendikspor | Free |
| 11 July 2025 | Rami Al Hajj | Plymouth Argyle | Silkeborg | Undisclosed |
| 11 July 2025 | Tyreeq Bakinson | Wycombe Wanderers | Leyton Orient | Undisclosed |
| 11 July 2025 | Eddie Beach | Chelsea | Kilmarnock | Free |
| 11 July 2025 | Jacob Bruun Larsen | VfB Stuttgart | Burnley | Undisclosed |
| 11 July 2025 | Jair Cunha | Botafogo | Nottingham Forest | Undisclosed |
| 11 July 2025 | Anthony Elanga | Nottingham Forest | Newcastle United | £55m |
| 11 July 2025 | Beryly Lubala | Wycombe Wanderers | Stevenage | Free |
| 11 July 2025 | Othmane Maamma | Montpellier | Watford | Undisclosed |
| 11 July 2025 | Joe Rankin-Costello | Blackburn Rovers | Charlton Athletic | Undisclosed |
| 11 July 2025 | Borna Sosa | Ajax | Crystal Palace | £3m |
| 12 July 2025 | Mathis Amougou | Chelsea | Strasbourg | £12m |
| 12 July 2025 | Marcell Washington | Chelsea | Arsenal | Free |
| 13 July 2025 | Azor Matusiwa | Rennes | Ipswich Town | Undisclosed |
| 13 July 2025 | Borja Sainz | Norwich City | Porto | £14.25m |
| 14 July 2025 | Ewan Henderson | Beerschot | Wycombe Wanderers | Undisclosed |
| 14 July 2025 | Richard Smallwood | Bradford City | Tranmere Rovers | Free |
| 14 July 2025 | Zak Sturge | Chelsea | Millwall | Undisclosed |
| 15 July 2025 | Lenny Agbaire | Celtic | Rotherham United | Undisclosed |
| 15 July 2025 | Patrick Agyemang | Charlotte FC | Derby County | £5.8m |
| 15 July 2025 | Lucas Bergström | Chelsea | Mallorca | Free |
| 15 July 2025 | Marco Bizot | Brest | Aston Villa | Undisclosed |
| 15 July 2025 | El Hadji Malick Diouf | Slavia Prague | West Ham United | £19m |
| 15 July 2025 | Djeidi Gassama | Sheffield Wednesday | Rangers | Undisclosed |
| 15 July 2025 | Lynden Gooch | Stoke City | Huddersfield Town | Free |
| 15 July 2025 | Jordan Henderson | Ajax | Brentford | Free |
| 15 July 2025 | Jamie Mullins | Brighton & Hove Albion | Wycombe Wanderers | Undisclosed |
| 15 July 2025 | Kane Smith | Stevenage | Barnet | Free |
| 15 July 2025 | John Swift | West Bromwich Albion | Portsmouth | Free |
| 15 July 2025 | Mark Travers | Bournemouth | Everton | Undisclosed |
| 16 July 2025 | Josh Koroma | Huddersfield Town | Leyton Orient | Free |
| 16 July 2025 | Đorđe Petrović | Chelsea | Bournemouth | £25m |
| 17 July 2025 | Dennis Adeniran | St Mirren | Barnet | Free |
| 17 July 2025 | Rob Apter | Blackpool | Charlton Athletic | Undisclosed |
| 17 July 2025 | Regan Booty | Gateshead | Barrow | Undisclosed |
| 17 July 2025 | Sverre Nypan | Rosenborg | Manchester City | £12.5m |
| 17 July 2025 | Kyle Scott | Orange County SC | Crawley Town | Undisclosed |
| 18 July 2025 | Luke Butterfield | Everton | Chesterfield | Free |
| 18 July 2025 | Liberato Cacace | Empoli | Wrexham | Undisclosed |
| 18 July 2025 | George Campbell | CF Montréal | West Bromwich Albion | Undisclosed |
| 18 July 2025 | Danilo | Nottingham Forest | Botafogo | Undisclosed |
| 18 July 2025 | Nestory Irankunda | Bayern Munich | Watford | Undisclosed |
| 18 July 2025 | Sean Longstaff | Newcastle United | Leeds United | £12m |
| 18 July 2025 | Noni Madueke | Chelsea | Arsenal | £48.5m |
| 18 July 2025 | James Norwood | Oldham Athletic | Fleetwood Town | Free |
| 18 July 2025 | Máximo Perrone | Manchester City | Como | £13m |
| 19 July 2025 | Luke Bolton | Wrexham | Mansfield Town | Free |
| 19 July 2025 | Josh Keeley | Tottenham Hotspur | Luton Town | Undisclosed |
| 19 July 2025 | Sean McLoughlin | Hull City | Blackburn Rovers | Undisclosed |
| 19 July 2025 | Dru Yearwood | Unattached | Rotherham United | Free |
| 20 July 2025 | Kyle Walker-Peters | Southampton | West Ham United | Free |
| 21 July 2025 | Josh Benson | Barnsley | Rotherham United | Free |
| 21 July 2025 | Billy Bodin | Burton Albion | Swindon Town | Free |
| 21 July 2025 | Aden Flint | Mansfield Town | Walsall | Free |
| 21 July 2025 | Arttu Hoskonen | Cracovia | Stockport County | Free |
| 21 July 2025 | Bryan Mbeumo | Brentford | Manchester United | £65m |
| 21 July 2025 | David Okagbue | Walsall | Peterborough United | Undisclosed |
| 21 July 2025 | George Thomason | Bolton Wanderers | Wrexham | Undisclosed |
| 22 July 2025 | Nathan Broome | Swansea City | Bolton Wanderers | Free |
| 22 July 2025 | Wouter Burger | Stoke City | TSG Hoffenheim | Undisclosed |
| 22 July 2025 | Mark Howard | Wrexham | Salford City | Free |
| 22 July 2025 | Daniel Kyerewaa | Preußen Münster | Reading | Free |
| 22 July 2025 | Alfie May | Birmingham City | Huddersfield Town | Undisclosed |
| 22 July 2025 | Bastien Meupiyou | Wolverhampton Wanderers | Alverca | Undisclosed |
| 22 July 2025 | Kobei Moore | Aston Villa | Larne | Free |
| 22 July 2025 | Anton Polendakov | Septemvri Sofia | Sheffield United | Undisclosed |
| 22 July 2025 | Kelle Roos | Triestina | Notts County | Free |
| 22 July 2025 | Michael Smith | Sheffield Wednesday | Preston North End | Free |
| 22 July 2025 | Anton Stach | TSG Hoffenheim | Leeds United | £17m |
| 22 July 2025 | Jack Walton | Luton Town | Preston North End | Undisclosed |
| 23 July 2025 | Luca Ashby-Hammond | Fulham | Plymouth Argyle | Free |
| 23 July 2025 | Hugo Ekitike | Eintracht Frankfurt | Liverpool | £69m |
| 23 July 2025 | Liam Fraser | Crawley Town | Reading | Free |
| 23 July 2025 | Marvin Kaleta | Wolverhampton Wanderers | Rotherham United | Undisclosed |
| 23 July 2025 | Marcus McGuane | Bristol City | Huddersfield Town | Undisclosed |
| 23 July 2025 | Mathaeus Roberts | Ipswich Town | Stevenage | Free |
| 23 July 2025 | Josh Windass | Sheffield Wednesday | Wrexham | Free |
| 23 July 2025 | Ashley Young | Everton | Ipswich Town | Free |
| 24 July 2025 | Jhon Arias | Fluminense | Wolverhampton Wanderers | £15m |
| 24 July 2025 | Róbert Boženík | Boavista | Stoke City | Free |
| 24 July 2025 | Papa Amadou Diallo | Metz | Norwich City | £4.3m |
| 24 July 2025 | Pervis Estupiñán | Brighton & Hove Albion | Milan | £17m |
| 24 July 2025 | Miguel Freckleton | Sheffield United | St Mirren | Undisclosed |
| 24 July 2025 | Kadeem Harris | Carlisle United | Salford City | Free |
| 24 July 2025 | Kane Hemmings | Crewe Alexandra | Barrow | Free |
| 24 July 2025 | Jenson Metcalfe | Everton | Bradford City | Undisclosed |
| 24 July 2025 | Sam Morsy | Ipswich Town | Kuwait SC | Free |
| 24 July 2025 | Cristhian Mosquera | Valencia | Arsenal | £13m |
| 24 July 2025 | Pelly Ruddock Mpanzu | Luton Town | Cambridge United | Free |
| 24 July 2025 | Lewis O'Brien | Nottingham Forest | Wrexham | Undisclosed |
| 24 July 2025 | Park Seung-soo | Suwon Bluewings | Newcastle United | Undisclosed |
| 24 July 2025 | Kjell Scherpen | Brighton & Hove Albion | Union Saint-Gilloise | Undisclosed |
| 24 July 2025 | Jeffrey Schlupp | Crystal Palace | Norwich City | Free |
| 24 July 2025 | Anthony Scully | Portsmouth | Shrewsbury Town | Free |
| 25 July 2025 | Dillon Addai | Millwall | Bromley | Free |
| 25 July 2025 | Ryan Broom | Fleetwood Town | Cheltenham Town | Free |
| 25 July 2025 | Tyrhys Dolan | Blackburn Rovers | Espanyol | Free |
| 25 July 2025 | Ethan Erhahon | Lincoln City | Bolton Wanderers | Undisclosed |
| 25 July 2025 | Ched Evans | Preston North End | Fleetwood Town | Free |
| 25 July 2025 | Denzel Hall | Heerenveen | Rotherham United | Undisclosed |
| 25 July 2025 | Alfie Jones | Hull City | Middlesbrough | Undisclosed |
| 25 July 2025 | Márk Kosznovszky | MTK Budapest | Portsmouth | Undisclosed |
| 25 July 2025 | Samuel Lavelle | Carlisle United | Grimsby Town | Free |
| 25 July 2025 | Luke Le Roux | IFK Värnamo | Portsmouth | Undisclosed |
| 25 July 2025 | Kyran Lofthouse | Barnsley | Burton Albion | Undisclosed |
| 25 July 2025 | Massimo Luongo | Ipswich Town | Millwall | Undisclosed |
| 25 July 2025 | Andrija Vukčević | Juárez | Preston North End | Free |
| 26 July 2025 | Rumarn Burrell | Burton Albion | Queens Park Rangers | Undisclosed |
| 26 July 2025 | Viktor Gyökeres | Sporting CP | Arsenal | £63m |
| 27 July 2025 | Charlie Kelman | Queens Park Rangers | Charlton Athletic | Undisclosed |
| 28 July 2025 | Jan Bednarek | Southampton | Porto | Undisclosed |
| 28 July 2025 | Lenni Cirino | Clitheroe | Gillingham | Free |
| 28 July 2025 | Alfie Doughty | Luton Town | Millwall | Undisclosed |
| 28 July 2025 | Jake Hollman | Macarthur FC | Walsall | Free |
| 28 July 2025 | Nnamdi Ofoborh | Swindon Town | Barnet | Free |
| 28 July 2025 | Callum Paterson | Sheffield Wednesday | Milton Keynes Dons | Free |
| 28 July 2025 | James Wilson | Bristol Rovers | Cheltenham Town | Free |
| 29 July 2025 | Louis Appéré | Stevenage | Cambridge United | Undisclosed |
| 29 July 2025 | Tom Barkhuizen | Derby County | Barrow | Free |
| 29 July 2025 | Asmir Begović | Everton | Leicester City | Free |
| 29 July 2025 | Keanan Bennetts | Austria Klagenfurt | Notts County | Free |
| 29 July 2025 | Luis Binks | Coventry City | Brøndby | Undisclosed |
| 29 July 2025 | Akin Famewo | Sheffield Wednesday | Hull City | Free |
| 29 July 2025 | João Félix | Chelsea | Al-Nassr | £26.2m |
| 29 July 2025 | Ellis Harrison | Milton Keynes Dons | Bristol Rovers | Free |
| 29 July 2025 | Abdoulaye Kanté | Troyes | Middlesbrough | Undisclosed |
| 29 July 2025 | Patrick Kelly | West Ham United | Barnsley | Free |
| 29 July 2025 | Filip Marschall | Aston Villa | Stevenage | Undisclosed |
| 29 July 2025 | Shane McLoughlin | Newport County | Cambridge United | Free |
| 29 July 2025 | Antonio Tikvić | Watford | Preußen Münster | Undisclosed |
| 29 July 2025 | James Trafford | Burnley | Manchester City | £31m |
| 29 July 2025 | Joe Wright | Millwall | Barnet | Free |
| 30 July 2025 | Luis Díaz | Liverpool | Bayern Munich | £65.5m |
| 30 July 2025 | Antwoine Hackford | Sheffield United | AFC Wimbledon | Free |
| 30 July 2025 | Ar'jany Martha | Beerschot | Rotherham United | Undisclosed |
| 30 July 2025 | Danilo Orsi | Burton Albion | AFC Wimbledon | Undisclosed |
| 30 July 2025 | Tyrese Shade | Eastleigh | Burton Albion | Undisclosed |
| 30 July 2025 | Ishé Samuels-Smith | Chelsea | Strasbourg | £6.5m |
| 30 July 2025 | Granit Xhaka | Bayer Leverkusen | Sunderland | £13m |
| 31 July 2025 | Jack Bycroft | Swindon Town | Exeter City | Free |
| 31 July 2025 | Jesse Derry | Crystal Palace | Chelsea | Undisclosed |
| 31 July 2025 | Paddy Lane | Portsmouth | Reading | Undisclosed |
| 31 July 2025 | Dan Ndoye | Bologna | Nottingham Forest | Undisclosed |
| 1 August 2025 | Cohen Bramall | Portsmouth | Luton Town | Free |
| 1 August 2025 | Rhian Brewster | Sheffield United | Derby County | Free |
| 1 August 2025 | Fabrizio Cavegn | Vaduz | Bristol Rovers | Undisclosed |
| 1 August 2025 | Conor Coady | Leicester City | Wrexham | £2m |
| 1 August 2025 | Enis Destan | Trabzonspor | Hull City | Free |
| 1 August 2025 | Jake Doyle-Hayes | Sligo Rovers | Exeter City | Undisclosed |
| 1 August 2025 | Harvey Knibbs | Reading | Charlton Athletic | Undisclosed |
| 1 August 2025 | Adrian Akande | Reading | Colchester United | Free |
| 1 August 2025 | Klaidi Lolos | Bolton Wanderers | Peterborough United | Undisclosed |
| 1 August 2025 | Robin Roefs | NEC | Sunderland | Undisclosed |
| 1 August 2025 | Sol Sidibe | Stoke City | PSV Eindhoven | Undisclosed |
| 1 August 2025 | Matt Turner | Nottingham Forest | Lyon | Undisclosed |
| 1 August 2025 | Lewis Warrington | Leyton Orient | Walsall | Free |
| 1 August 2025 | Jerry Yates | Swansea City | Luton Town | Undisclosed |
| 2 August 2025 | Danny Andrew | Cambridge United | Stockport County | Free |
| 2 August 2025 | Morgan Fox | Queens Park Rangers | Wigan Athletic | Free |
| 2 August 2025 | David Møller Wolfe | AZ | Wolverhampton Wanderers | £10m |
| 2 August 2025 | Callum Wilson | Newcastle United | West Ham United | Free |
| 3 August 2025 | Jorrel Hato | Ajax | Chelsea | £35.5m |
| 3 August 2025 | Mirko Topić | Famalicão | Norwich City | Undisclosed |
| 4 August 2025 | Callum Brittain | Blackburn Rovers | Middlesbrough | Undisclosed |
| 4 August 2025 | Lemar Gordon | Fulham | Leyton Orient | Undisclosed |
| 4 August 2025 | Jovon Makama | Lincoln City | Norwich City | £1.2m |
| 4 August 2025 | Lewis Miller | Hibernian | Blackburn Rovers | Undisclosed |
| 4 August 2025 | Ryan Porteous | Watford | Los Angeles FC | £752,000 |
| 5 August 2025 | Anel Ahmedhodžić | Sheffield United | Feyenoord | £15.6m |
| 5 August 2025 | Malcolm Ebiowei | Crystal Palace | Blackpool | Undisclosed |
| 5 August 2025 | Kieffer Moore | Sheffield United | Wrexham | £2m |
| 5 August 2025 | Tyler Morton | Liverpool | Lyon | £15m |
| 5 August 2025 | Estêvão Willian | Palmeiras | Chelsea | £29m |
| 6 August 2025 | Kiernan Dewsbury-Hall | Chelsea | Everton | £25m |
| 6 August 2025 | Angus Gunn | Norwich City | Nottingham Forest | Free |
| 6 August 2025 | Axel Henriksson | GAIS | Blackburn Rovers | Undisclosed |
| 6 August 2025 | Liam Shephard | Salford City | Newport County | Free |
| 6 August 2025 | Son Heung-min | Tottenham Hotspur | Los Angeles FC | £19.5m |
| 6 August 2025 | Connor Taylor | Bristol Rovers | Wycombe Wanderers | Undisclosed |
| 6 August 2025 | Lesley Ugochukwu | Chelsea | Burnley | £23.2m |
| 7 August 2025 | Jack Baldwin | Northampton Town | Colchester United | Free |
| 7 August 2025 | Martin Dúbravka | Newcastle United | Burnley | Undisclosed |
| 7 August 2025 | Marvin Ducksch | Werder Bremen | Birmingham City | Undisclosed |
| 7 August 2025 | Oli McBurnie | Las Palmas | Hull City | Free |
| 7 August 2025 | Thomas Partey | Arsenal | Villarreal | Free |
| 7 August 2025 | Joe Quigley | Forest Green Rovers | Oldham Athletic | Undisclosed |
| 7 August 2025 | Jamie Robson | Forest Green Rovers | Oldham Athletic | Undisclosed |
| 7 August 2025 | Dale Taylor | Nottingham Forest | Blackpool | Undisclosed |
| 8 August 2025 | Armando Broja | Chelsea | Burnley | £20m |
| 8 August 2025 | Marvin Ekpiteta | Hibernian | Milton Keynes Dons | Undisclosed |
| 8 August 2025 | Evann Guessand | Nice | Aston Villa | £26m |
| 8 August 2025 | George Harmon | Ross County | Cheltenham Town | Free |
| 8 August 2025 | Conor McAleny | Salford City | Harrogate Town | Free |
| 8 August 2025 | Wilfred Ndidi | Leicester City | Beşiktaş | Undisclosed |
| 8 August 2025 | Steven Nzonzi | Sepahan | Stoke City | Free |
| 8 August 2025 | Ollie Turton | Huddersfield Town | Salford City | Free |
| 8 August 2025 | Tennai Watson | Charlton Athletic | Barnsley | Free |
| 9 August 2025 | Mads Hermansen | Leicester City | West Ham United | £20m |
| 9 August 2025 | Darwin Núñez | Liverpool | Al-Hilal | £46.3m |
| 9 August 2025 | Benjamin Šeško | RB Leipzig | Manchester United | £66.3m |
| 10 August 2025 | Mackenzie Hunt | Fleetwood Town | Baniyas | Undisclosed |
| 10 August 2025 | Arthur Masuaku | Beşiktaş | Sunderland | Free |
| 11 August 2025 | Jovan Malcolm | Gateshead | Stevenage | Undisclosed |
| 11 August 2025 | Jude Soonsup-Bell | Córdoba | Grimsby Town | Free |
| 12 August 2025 | Malick Thiaw | Milan | Newcastle United | £34.6m |
| 12 August 2025 | Illya Zabarnyi | Bournemouth | Paris Saint-Germain | £54.5m |
| 13 August 2025 | Bafodé Diakité | Lille | Bournemouth | £30.3m |
| 13 August 2025 | Sontje Hansen | NEC | Middlesbrough | Undisclosed |
| 13 August 2025 | Richard Kone | Wycombe Wanderers | Queens Park Rangers | Undisclosed |
| 13 August 2025 | Tyler Miller | Notts County | Bolton Wanderers | Free |
| 13 August 2025 | Rav van den Berg | Middlesbrough | 1. FC Köln | £11.2m |
| 14 August 2025 | Krystian Bielik | Birmingham City | West Bromwich Albion | Undisclosed |
| 14 August 2025 | Nathan Broadhead | Ipswich Town | Wrexham | £10m |
| 14 August 2025 | Lamine Cissé | Bastia | Stoke City | £2m |
| 14 August 2025 | Matthew Garbett | NAC Breda | Peterborough United | Free |
| 14 August 2025 | Brad Hills | Norwich City | Stockport County | Undisclosed |
| 15 August 2025 | David Akintola | Çaykur Rizespor | Hull City | Free |
| 15 August 2025 | Dominic Calvert-Lewin | Everton | Leeds United | Free |
| 15 August 2025 | Torbjørn Heggem | West Bromwich Albion | Bologna | £10m |
| 15 August 2025 | Giovanni Leoni | Parma | Liverpool | £26m |
| 15 August 2025 | Josh Martin | Newport County | Cheltenham Town | Free |
| 15 August 2025 | Walter Nutter | Chelsea | Southampton | Free |
| 15 August 2025 | Brandon Williams | Unattached | Hull City | Free |
| 15 August 2025 | Derrick Williams | Atlanta United | Reading | Free |
| 16 August 2025 | Max Dickov | Brentford | Mansfield Town | Free |
| 16 August 2025 | Omari Hutchinson | Ipswich Town | Nottingham Forest | £37.5m |
| 16 August 2025 | Tom Lees | Huddersfield Town | Peterborough United | Free |
| 16 August 2025 | James McAtee | Manchester City | Nottingham Forest | £30m |
| 16 August 2025 | Dango Ouattara | Bournemouth | Brentford | £42.5m |
| 17 August 2025 | Nordi Mukiele | Paris Saint-Germain | Sunderland | £9.5m |
| 17 August 2025 | Jacob Ramsey | Aston Villa | Newcastle United | £40m |
| 18 August 2025 | Ben Doak | Liverpool | Bournemouth | £20m |
| 18 August 2025 | Arnaud Kalimuendo | Rennes | Nottingham Forest | £26m |
| 18 August 2025 | Nick Powell | Stockport County | Bradford City | Free |
| 18 August 2025 | Ben Woods | Accrington Stanley | Peterborough United | Undisclosed |
| 19 August 2025 | Leander Dendoncker | Aston Villa | Oviedo | Undisclosed |
| 19 August 2025 | Jackson Tchatchoua | Hellas Verona | Wolverhampton Wanderers | £10.8m |
| 20 August 2025 | Patrick Bauer | Preston North End | AFC Wimbledon | Free |
| 20 August 2025 | Adilson Malanda | Charlotte FC | Middlesbrough | Undisclosed |
| 20 August 2025 | Marko Stamenić | Nottingham Forest | Swansea City | Undisclosed |
| 21 August 2025 | Amine Adli | Bayer Leverkusen | Bournemouth | £25.1m |
| 21 August 2025 | Callum Doyle | Manchester City | Wrexham | £7.5m |
| 21 August 2025 | Josh Knight | Hannover 96 | Portsmouth | Undisclosed |
| 21 August 2025 | Noah Okafor | Milan | Leeds United | £18m |
| 21 August 2025 | Mads Roerslev | Brentford | Southampton | Undisclosed |
| 21 August 2025 | Michael Rose | Stoke City | Salford City | Free |
| 21 August 2025 | Mathias Ross | Galatasaray | Plymouth Argyle | Free |
| 21 August 2025 | Ivan Varfolomeyev | Slovan Liberec | Lincoln City | £350,000 |
| 22 August 2025 | Matt Butcher | Wycombe Wanderers | Salford City | Undisclosed |
| 22 August 2025 | Kasey McAteer | Leicester City | Ipswich Town | £12m |
| 22 August 2025 | Àlex Moreno | Aston Villa | Girona | Undisclosed |
| 22 August 2025 | Lorent Tolaj | Port Vale | Plymouth Argyle | Undisclosed |
| 22 August 2025 | Renato Veiga | Chelsea | Villarreal | £26m |
| 22 August 2025 | Ben Whitfield | Burton Albion | Barrow | Free |
| 22 August 2025 | Nils Zätterström | Malmö FF | Sheffield United | Undisclosed |
| 23 August 2025 | Eberechi Eze | Crystal Palace | Arsenal | £60m |
| 25 August 2025 | Tyler Dibling | Southampton | Everton | £35m |
| 25 August 2025 | True Grant | Manchester City | Stoke City | Undisclosed |
| 25 August 2025 | Isaac Hayden | Newcastle United | Queens Park Rangers | Free |
| 25 August 2025 | James Justin | Leicester City | Leeds United | £10m |
| 25 August 2025 | Kōki Saitō | Lommel | Queens Park Rangers | Undisclosed |
| 26 August 2025 | Carney Chukwuemeka | Chelsea | Borussia Dortmund | £24m |
| 26 August 2025 | Brandon Cooper | Leyton Orient | Salford City | Undisclosed |
| 26 August 2025 | Jack Marriott | Wrexham | Reading | Undisclosed |
| 26 August 2025 | Lewis McCann | Dunfermline Athletic | Fleetwood Town | Undisclosed |
| 26 August 2025 | Ryōya Morishita | Legia Warsaw | Blackburn Rovers | Undisclosed |
| 26 August 2025 | Oscar Thorn | Colchester United | Lincoln City | Undisclosed |
| 27 August 2025 | Sam Greenwood | Leeds United | Pogoń Szczecin | Undisclosed |
| 27 August 2025 | Danny Ings | West Ham United | Sheffield United | Free |
| 27 August 2025 | Lewis Travis | Blackburn Rovers | Derby County | Undisclosed |
| 28 August 2025 | Joel Coleman | Bolton Wanderers | Millwall | Free |
| 28 August 2025 | Jordan Davies | Wrexham | Fleetwood Town | Free |
| 28 August 2025 | Darnell Furlong | West Bromwich Albion | Ipswich Town | £4m |
| 28 August 2025 | Max Johnston | Sturm Graz | Derby County | Undisclosed |
| 28 August 2025 | Nampalys Mendy | Lens | Watford | Free |
| 28 August 2025 | Chris Mepham | Bournemouth | West Bromwich Albion | Undisclosed |
| 28 August 2025 | Matt Ritchie | Portsmouth | Reading | Free |
| 28 August 2025 | Ryan Tafazolli | Wycombe Wanderers | Swindon Town | Undisclosed |
| 28 August 2025 | Japhet Tanganga | Millwall | Sheffield United | Undisclosed |
| 29 August 2025 | Finn Azaz | Middlesbrough | Southampton | £12m |
| 29 August 2025 | Will Brook | Leamington | Shrewsbury Town | Free |
| 29 August 2025 | Tahith Chong | Luton Town | Sheffield United | Undisclosed |
| 29 August 2025 | Sindre Walle Egeli | Nordsjælland | Ipswich Town | £17.5m |
| 29 August 2025 | Tom Fellows | West Bromwich Albion | Southampton | £8m |
| 29 August 2025 | Mateus Fernandes | Southampton | West Ham United | £40m |
| 29 August 2025 | Alfie Gilchrist | Chelsea | West Bromwich Albion | £1.2m |
| 29 August 2025 | Caspar Jander | 1. FC Nürnberg | Southampton | £10.4m |
| 29 August 2025 | Soungoutou Magassa | Monaco | West Ham United | £17.3m |
| 29 August 2025 | Scott Malone | Cambridge United | Crawley Town | Free |
| 29 August 2025 | Pelle Mattsson | Silkeborg | Norwich City | Undisclosed |
| 29 August 2025 | Marcelino Núñez | Norwich City | Ipswich Town | £10m |
| 29 August 2025 | Jeppe Okkels | Preston North End | Djurgårdens IF | Undisclosed |
| 29 August 2025 | Ollie Palmer | Wrexham | Swindon Town | Undisclosed |
| 29 August 2025 | Yeremy Pino | Villarreal | Crystal Palace | £26m |
| 29 August 2025 | Kaly Sène | Lausanne-Sport | Middlesbrough | Undisclosed |
| 29 August 2025 | Fábio Silva | Wolverhampton Wanderers | Borussia Dortmund | Undisclosed |
| 29 August 2025 | Abdallah Sima | Brighton & Hove Albion | Lens | Undisclosed |
| 29 August 2025 | Xavi Simons | RB Leipzig | Tottenham Hotspur | £51.8m |
| 29 August 2025 | Caleb Taylor | West Bromwich Albion | Millwall | Undisclosed |
| 30 August 2025 | Alejandro Garnacho | Manchester United | Chelsea | £40m |
| 30 August 2025 | Christopher Nkunku | Chelsea | Milan | £32m |
| 30 August 2025 | Andreas Pereira | Fulham | Palmeiras | Undisclosed |
| 30 August 2025 | Tomáš Rigo | Baník Ostrava | Stoke City | Undisclosed |
| 30 August 2025 | Nicolò Savona | Juventus | Nottingham Forest | £13.4m |
| 30 August 2025 | Nick Woltemade | VfB Stuttgart | Newcastle United | £65m |
| 31 August 2025 | Ryan Andrews | Watford | Young Boys | £2.6m |
| 31 August 2025 | Andri Guðjohnsen | Gent | Blackburn Rovers | Undisclosed |
| 31 August 2025 | Derek Mazou-Sacko | Rodez | Millwall | Undisclosed |
| 31 August 2025 | John Victor | Botafogo | Nottingham Forest | Undisclosed |
| 31 August 2025 | Kane Wilson | Derby County | Milton Keynes Dons | Undisclosed |
| 1 September 2025 | Nayef Aguerd | West Ham United | Marseille | Undisclosed |
| 1 September 2025 | Danny Andrew | Stockport County | Exeter City | Undisclosed |
| 1 September 2025 | Antony | Manchester United | Real Betis | £21.65m |
| 1 September 2025 | Tolu Arokodare | Genk | Wolverhampton Wanderers | £24m |
| 1 September 2025 | Dilane Bakwa | Strasbourg | Nottingham Forest | £30m |
| 1 September 2025 | Dom Ballard | Southampton | Leyton Orient | Undisclosed |
| 1 September 2025 | Josh Bowler | Nottingham Forest | Blackpool | Free |
| 1 September 2025 | Brian Brobbey | Ajax | Sunderland | £17.3m |
| 1 September 2025 | Josef Bursik | Club Brugge | Portsmouth | Undisclosed |
| 1 September 2025 | Jaydee Canvot | Toulouse | Crystal Palace | Undisclosed |
| 1 September 2025 | Youssef Chermiti | Everton | Rangers | Undisclosed |
| 1 September 2025 | Nikoloz Chikovani | Dinamo Tbilisi | Watford | Undisclosed |
| 1 September 2025 | Ben Chilwell | Chelsea | Strasbourg | Undisclosed |
| 1 September 2025 | Cyrus Christie | Swansea City | Bolton Wanderers | Free |
| 1 September 2025 | Darko Churlinov | Burnley | Kocaelispor | Undisclosed |
| 1 September 2025 | Devante Cole | West Bromwich Albion | Port Vale | Undisclosed |
| 1 September 2025 | Cuiabano | Botafogo | Nottingham Forest | Undisclosed |
| 1 September 2025 | Gianluigi Donnarumma | Paris Saint-Germain | Manchester City | £26m |
| 1 September 2025 | Ederson | Manchester City | Fenerbahçe | £12.1m |
| 1 September 2025 | Odsonne Édouard | Crystal Palace | Lens | Undisclosed |
| 1 September 2025 | Kyle Edwards | Stevenage | Northampton Town | Free |
| 1 September 2025 | George Evans | Wrexham | Burton Albion | Free |
| 1 September 2025 | Bryan Gil | Tottenham Hotspur | Girona | Undisclosed |
| 1 September 2025 | Martial Godo | Fulham | Strasbourg | Undisclosed |
| 1 September 2025 | George Hall | Birmingham City | Port Vale | Undisclosed |
| 1 September 2025 | Alex Hartridge | Wycombe Wanderers | Burton Albion | Undisclosed |
| 1 September 2025 | Adam Idah | Celtic | Swansea City | £6m |
| 1 September 2025 | Joe Ironside | Doncaster Rovers | Tranmere Rovers | Undisclosed |
| 1 September 2025 | Alexander Isak | Newcastle United | Liverpool | £125m |
| 1 September 2025 | Abdoulaye Kamara | Portsmouth | 1. FC Saarbrücken | Free |
| 1 September 2025 | Kevin | Shakhtar Donetsk | Fulham | £34.6m |
| 1 September 2025 | Makenzie Kirk | St Johnstone | Portsmouth | Undisclosed |
| 1 September 2025 | Senne Lammens | Antwerp | Manchester United | £18.1m |
| 1 September 2025 | Tariq Lamptey | Brighton & Hove Albion | Fiorentina | Undisclosed |
| 1 September 2025 | Harry Leonard | Blackburn Rovers | Peterborough United | Undisclosed |
| 1 September 2025 | Victor Lindelöf | Manchester United | Aston Villa | Free |
| 1 September 2025 | Alex Matos | Chelsea | Sheffield United | Undisclosed |
| 1 September 2025 | Garath McCleary | Wycombe Wanderers | Gillingham | Free |
| 1 September 2025 | Mark McGuinness | Luton Town | Sheffield United | Free |
| 1 September 2025 | Jon McLaughlin | Swansea City | Middlesbrough | Free |
| 1 September 2025 | Ben Mee | Brentford | Sheffield United | Free |
| 1 September 2025 | Veljko Milosavljević | Red Star Belgrade | Bournemouth | £13m |
| 1 September 2025 | Donnell McNeilly | Chelsea | Nottingham Forest | Free |
| 1 September 2025 | Shayden Morris | Aberdeen | Luton Town | Undisclosed |
| 1 September 2025 | Kevin Nisbet | Millwall | Aberdeen | £300,000 |
| 1 September 2025 | Emerson Palmieri | West Ham United | Marseille | Undisclosed |
| 1 September 2025 | Jeremy Petris | Charleroi | Watford | Free |
| 1 September 2025 | Adam Reach | Wycombe Wanderers | Lincoln City | Free |
| 1 September 2025 | Albert Sambi Lokonga | Arsenal | Hamburger SV | Undisclosed |
| 1 September 2025 | Ishé Samuels-Smith | Strasbourg | Chelsea | Undisclosed |
| 1 September 2025 | Toby Savin | Shrewsbury Town | Wigan Athletic | Free |
| 1 September 2025 | Léo Scienza | 1. FC Heidenheim | Southampton | Undisclosed |
| 1 September 2025 | Ben Sheaf | Coventry City | Wrexham | £6.5m |
| 1 September 2025 | David Strelec | Slovan Bratislava | Middlesbrough | Undisclosed |
| 1 September 2025 | Daniel Udoh | Wycombe Wanderers | Salford City | Undisclosed |
| 1 September 2025 | Franco Umeh | Crystal Palace | Portsmouth | Undisclosed |
| 1 September 2025 | Jamie Vardy | Leicester City | Cremonese | Free |
| 1 September 2025 | Yoane Wissa | Brentford | Newcastle United | £50m |
| 1 September 2025 | Luke Woolfenden | Ipswich Town | Coventry City | Undisclosed |

== Loans ==
| Start date | End date | Player | Moving from | Moving to |
|---|---|---|---|---|
| 4 February 2025 | 30 June 2025 | Jack Cooper-Love | Burton Albion | De Graafschap |
| 4 February 2025 | 30 June 2025 | Tyrell Malacia | Manchester United | PSV Eindhoven |
| 4 February 2025 | 30 June 2025 | Bojan Radulović | Huddersfield Town | Fortuna Sittard |
| 10 February 2025 | 30 June 2025 | Abdülkadir Ömür | Hull City | Çaykur Rizespor |
| 11 February 2025 | 31 December 2025 | Lukas Engel | Middlesbrough | FC Cincinnati |
| 17 February 2025 | 30 June 2025 | Nikola Jojić | Stoke City | Gorica |
| 20 February 2025 | 31 December 2025 | Deivid Washington | Chelsea | Santos |
| 12 March 2025 | 8 July 2025 | Elijah Dixon-Bonner | Queens Park Rangers | Västerås SK |
| 21 March 2025 | 28 March 2025 | Thimothée Lo-Tutala | Hull City | Crawley Town |
| 11 April 2025 | 18 April 2025 | Luke Hutchinson | Bolton Wanderers | Crawley Town |
| 17 April 2025 | 24 April 2025 | Toby Steward | Portsmouth | Crawley Town |
| 10 June 2025 | 30 June 2026 | Tom Iorpenda | Huddersfield Town | Notts County |
| 16 June 2025 | 30 June 2026 | Josh Feeney | Aston Villa | Huddersfield Town |
| 16 June 2025 | 30 June 2026 | Thimothée Lo-Tutala | Hull City | Doncaster Rovers |
| 18 June 2025 | 30 June 2026 | Vítězslav Jaroš | Liverpool | Ajax |
| 20 June 2025 | 30 June 2026 | Teddy Sharman-Lowe | Chelsea | Bolton Wanderers |
| 21 June 2025 | 30 June 2026 | Daniel Jebbison | Bournemouth | Preston North End |
| 23 June 2025 | 30 June 2026 | Murphy Cooper | Queens Park Rangers | Barnsley |
| 23 June 2025 | 30 June 2026 | Kyle McAdam | Nottingham Forest | Mansfield Town |
| 23 June 2025 | 30 June 2026 | JJ McKiernan | Lincoln City | Burton Albion |
| 23 June 2025 | 30 June 2026 | Paul Mullin | Wrexham | Wigan Athletic |
| 24 June 2025 | 30 June 2026 | Damola Ajayi | Tottenham Hotspur | Doncaster Rovers |
| 25 June 2025 | 30 June 2026 | Max Aarons | Bournemouth | Rangers |
| 25 June 2025 | 30 June 2026 | Ryan Rydel | Stockport County | Exeter City |
| 26 June 2025 | 30 June 2026 | Ethan Brierley | Brentford | Exeter City |
| 26 June 2025 | 30 June 2026 | Harvey Davies | Liverpool | Crawley Town |
| 26 June 2025 | 30 June 2026 | Nathanael Ogbeta | Plymouth Argyle | Barnsley |
| 27 June 2025 | 30 June 2026 | Michael Adu-Poku | Watford | Barrow |
| 27 June 2025 | 30 June 2026 | Connor O'Riordan | Blackburn Rovers | Doncaster Rovers |
| 27 June 2025 | 30 June 2026 | Michael Reindorf | Cardiff City | Newport County |
| 29 June 2025 | 30 June 2026 | Michael Baidoo | Plymouth Argyle | Umm Salal |
| 30 June 2025 | 30 June 2026 | James Abankwah | Udinese | Watford |
| 30 June 2025 | 30 June 2026 | Myles Roberts | Watford | Walsall |
| 1 July 2025 | 30 June 2026 | James Beadle | Brighton & Hove Albion | Birmingham City |
| 1 July 2025 | 30 June 2026 | Jonny Stuttle | Bournemouth | Walsall |
| 2 July 2025 | 30 June 2026 | Tommy Doyle | Wolverhampton Wanderers | Birmingham City |
| 2 July 2025 | 30 June 2026 | Owen Goodman | Crystal Palace | Huddersfield Town |
| 3 July 2025 | 30 June 2026 | Matt Dibley-Dias | Fulham | Chesterfield |
| 4 July 2025 | 30 June 2026 | Tyler Bindon | Nottingham Forest | Sheffield United |
| 4 July 2025 | 30 June 2026 | Barry Cotter | Barnsley | Notts County |
| 4 July 2025 | 30 June 2026 | Matty Jacob | Hull City | Reading |
| 4 July 2025 | 30 June 2026 | Juan Larios | Southampton | Cultural Leonesa |
| 4 July 2025 | 30 June 2026 | Maximilian Wöber | Leeds United | Werder Bremen |
| 4 July 2025 | 30 June 2026 | Callum Wright | Plymouth Argyle | Wigan Athletic |
| 5 July 2025 | 30 June 2026 | Amario Cozier-Duberry | Brighton & Hove Albion | Bolton Wanderers |
| 5 July 2025 | 30 June 2026 | Divin Mubama | Manchester City | Stoke City |
| 6 July 2025 | 30 June 2026 | Taine Anderson | Bristol City | Cheltenham Town |
| 6 July 2025 | 30 June 2026 | Finley Burns | Manchester City | Reading |
| 6 July 2025 | 30 June 2026 | Mark O'Mahony | Brighton & Hove Albion | Reading |
| 7 July 2025 | 30 June 2026 | Eseosa Sule | West Bromwich Albion | Motherwell |
| 8 July 2025 | 30 June 2026 | Andréas Hountondji | Burnley | FC St. Pauli |
| 8 July 2025 | 30 June 2026 | Kai Payne | Wigan Athletic | Oldham Athletic |
| 8 July 2025 | 30 June 2026 | Devan Tanton | Fulham | Chesterfield |
| 8 July 2025 | 30 June 2026 | Ollie Wright | Southampton | Accrington Stanley |
| 9 July 2025 | 30 June 2026 | Nasser Djiga | Wolverhampton Wanderers | Rangers |
| 9 July 2025 | 30 June 2026 | Will Goodwin | Oxford United | Colchester United |
| 10 July 2025 | 30 June 2026 | Sonny Aljofree | Manchester United | Notts County |
| 10 July 2025 | 30 June 2026 | Nigel Lonwijk | Wolverhampton Wanderers | Luton Town |
| 10 July 2025 | 30 June 2026 | Joe Whitworth | Crystal Palace | Exeter City |
| 11 July 2025 | 30 June 2026 | Sam Waller | Burnley | Crewe Alexandra |
| 13 July 2025 | 30 June 2026 | Cédric Kipré | Reims | Ipswich Town |
| 14 July 2025 | 30 June 2026 | Joe Gardner | Nottingham Forest | Mansfield Town |
| 14 July 2025 | 30 June 2026 | Kosta Nedeljković | Aston Villa | RB Leipzig |
| 14 July 2025 | 30 June 2026 | Oliwier Zych | Aston Villa | Raków Częstochowa |
| 15 July 2025 | 30 June 2026 | Danny Imray | Crystal Palace | Blackpool |
| 15 July 2025 | 30 June 2026 | Finley Munroe | Aston Villa | Swindon Town |
| 15 July 2025 | 30 June 2026 | Tommi O'Reilly | Aston Villa | Crewe Alexandra |
| 16 July 2025 | 30 June 2026 | Luca Kjerrumgaard | Udinese | Watford |
| 16 July 2025 | 30 June 2026 | Ben Krauhaus | Brentford | Bromley |
| 16 July 2025 | 30 June 2026 | Yoon Do-young | Brighton & Hove Albion | Excelsior |
| 17 July 2025 | 30 June 2026 | Dan Gore | Manchester United | Rotherham United |
| 17 July 2025 | 30 June 2026 | Sil Swinkels | Aston Villa | Exeter City |
| 17 July 2025 | 30 June 2026 | Jordan Thorniley | Oxford United | Northampton Town |
| 18 July 2025 | 30 June 2026 | Enzo Barrenechea | Aston Villa | Benfica |
| 18 July 2025 | 30 June 2026 | Dan Cox | Derby County | Walsall |
| 18 July 2025 | 30 June 2026 | Jamie McDonnell | Nottingham Forest | Mansfield Town |
| 18 July 2025 | 30 June 2026 | Corey O'Keeffe | Barnsley | Stockport County |
| 18 July 2025 | 30 June 2026 | Bailey Peacock-Farrell | Birmingham City | Blackpool |
| 18 July 2025 | 30 June 2026 | Tommy Simkin | Stoke City | Leyton Orient |
| 18 July 2025 | 30 June 2026 | Max Watters | Barnsley | Dundee United |
| 19 July 2025 | 30 June 2026 | Alfie Dorrington | Tottenham Hotspur | Aberdeen |
| 19 July 2025 | 30 June 2026 | Joe Hugill | Manchester United | Barnet |
| 21 July 2025 | 30 June 2026 | Billy Blacker | Sheffield United | Tranmere Rovers |
| 21 July 2025 | 30 June 2026 | Caylan Vickers | Brighton & Hove Albion | Barnsley |
| 22 July 2025 | 30 June 2026 | Louie Barry | Aston Villa | Sheffield United |
| 22 July 2025 | 30 June 2026 | Elyh Harrison | Manchester United | Shrewsbury Town |
| 22 July 2025 | 30 June 2026 | Gideon Kodua | West Ham United | Luton Town |
| 22 July 2025 | 30 June 2026 | Caleb Wiley | Chelsea | Watford |
| 23 July 2025 | 30 June 2026 | Evan Ferguson | Brighton & Hove Albion | Roma |
| 23 July 2025 | 31 December 2025 | Taylan Harris | Luton Town | Tranmere Rovers |
| 23 July 2025 | 30 June 2026 | Ashley Phillips | Tottenham Hotspur | Stoke City |
| 23 July 2025 | 30 June 2026 | Marcus Rashford | Manchester United | Barcelona |
| 24 July 2025 | 30 June 2026 | Abraham Kanu | Reading | Forest Green Rovers |
| 24 July 2025 | 30 June 2026 | Carl Rushworth | Brighton & Hove Albion | Coventry City |
| 24 July 2025 | 30 June 2026 | Emre Tezgel | Stoke City | Crewe Alexandra |
| 24 July 2025 | 30 June 2026 | Boubacar Traoré | Wolverhampton Wanderers | Metz |
| 24 July 2025 | 30 June 2026 | Matty Young | Sunderland | Salford City |
| 25 July 2025 | 30 June 2026 | Owen Beck | Liverpool | Derby County |
| 25 July 2025 | 30 June 2026 | Eiran Cashin | Brighton & Hove Albion | Birmingham City |
| 25 July 2025 | 30 June 2026 | Michael Forbes | West Ham United | Northampton Town |
| 26 July 2025 | 30 June 2026 | Tayo Adaramola | Crystal Palace | Leyton Orient |
| 26 July 2025 | 30 June 2026 | Luke Harris | Fulham | Oxford United |
| 26 July 2025 | 30 June 2026 | Abdülkadir Ömür | Hull City | Antalyaspor |
| 26 July 2025 | 30 June 2026 | Thomas Wilson-Brown | Leicester City | Swindon Town |
| 28 July 2025 | 30 June 2026 | Mason Burstow | Hull City | Bolton Wanderers |
| 28 July 2025 | 30 June 2026 | Ben Lloyd | Swansea City | Newport County |
| 28 July 2025 | 30 June 2026 | Mike Penders | Chelsea | Strasbourg |
| 28 July 2025 | 30 June 2026 | Radek Vítek | Manchester United | Bristol City |
| 29 July 2025 | 30 June 2026 | Jayden Luker | Luton Town | Notts County |
| 29 July 2025 | 30 June 2026 | Joel Ndala | Manchester City | Hull City |
| 29 July 2025 | 30 June 2026 | Jokūbas Mažionis | Ipswich Town | Cheltenham Town |
| 29 July 2025 | 30 June 2026 | David Ozoh | Crystal Palace | Derby County |
| 29 July 2025 | 30 June 2026 | Joe White | Newcastle United | Leyton Orient |
| 30 July 2025 | 30 June 2026 | Nathan Asiimwe | Charlton Athletic | AFC Wimbledon |
| 30 July 2025 | 30 June 2026 | Nathan Lowe | Stoke City | Stockport County |
| 31 July 2025 | 30 June 2026 | Florian Bianchini | Swansea City | Portsmouth |
| 31 July 2025 | 30 June 2026 | Owen Dodgson | Burnley | Stockport County |
| 31 July 2025 | 30 June 2026 | Tomas Kalinauskas | Burton Albion | Kalmar FF |
| 31 July 2025 | 30 June 2026 | John Lundstram | Trabzonspor | Hull City |
| 31 July 2025 | 30 June 2026 | Kendry Páez | Chelsea | Strasbourg |
| 31 July 2025 | 31 December 2025 | Vicente Reyes | Norwich City | Peterborough United |
| 31 July 2025 | 30 June 2026 | Ryan Trevitt | Brentford | Wigan Athletic |
| 1 August 2025 | 30 June 2026 | Jake Bickerstaff | Wrexham | Cheltenham Town |
| 1 August 2025 | 30 June 2026 | Leo Castledine | Chelsea | Huddersfield Town |
| 1 August 2025 | 30 June 2026 | Kion Etete | Cardiff City | Rotherham United |
| 1 August 2025 | 30 June 2026 | Emil Hansson | Birmingham City | Blackpool |
| 1 August 2025 | 30 June 2026 | Isaac Mabaya | Liverpool | Wigan Athletic |
| 1 August 2025 | 30 June 2026 | Mikey Moore | Tottenham Hotspur | Rangers |
| 1 August 2025 | 30 June 2026 | Jack Moorhouse | Manchester United | Leyton Orient |
| 1 August 2025 | 30 June 2026 | Mamadou Sarr | Chelsea | Strasbourg |
| 1 August 2025 | 30 June 2026 | Ethan Wheatley | Manchester United | Northampton Town |
| 2 August 2025 | 30 June 2026 | Yasin Özcan | Aston Villa | Anderlecht |
| 2 August 2025 | 30 June 2026 | Nik Prelec | Cagliari | Oxford United |
| 2 August 2025 | 30 June 2026 | Aaron Ramsdale | Southampton | Newcastle United |
| 3 August 2025 | 30 June 2026 | João Palhinha | Bayern Munich | Tottenham Hotspur |
| 4 August 2025 | 30 June 2026 | Kaelan Casey | West Ham United | Swansea City |
| 4 August 2025 | 30 June 2026 | Kamari Doyle | Brighton & Hove Albion | Reading |
| 4 August 2025 | 30 June 2026 | Tyrese Hall | Tottenham Hotspur | Notts County |
| 4 August 2025 | 30 June 2026 | Djibril Soumaré | Braga | Sheffield United |
| 5 August 2025 | 30 June 2026 | Joe Bauress | Burnley | Accrington Stanley |
| 5 August 2025 | 30 June 2026 | Bobby Clark | Red Bull Salzburg | Derby County |
| 5 August 2025 | 30 June 2026 | Charlie Crew | Leeds United | Doncaster Rovers |
| 5 August 2025 | 30 June 2026 | Ronan Darcy | Wigan Athletic | Chesterfield |
| 5 August 2025 | 30 June 2026 | Dion Sanderson | Birmingham City | Derby County |
| 5 August 2025 | 30 June 2026 | Will Lankshear | Tottenham Hotspur | Oxford United |
| 6 August 2025 | 30 June 2026 | George Abbott | Tottenham Hotspur | Wycombe Wanderers |
| 6 August 2025 | 30 June 2026 | Jamie Donley | Tottenham Hotspur | Stoke City |
| 6 August 2025 | 30 June 2026 | Marc Guiu | Chelsea | Sunderland |
| 6 August 2025 | 30 June 2026 | Josh Powell | Nottingham Forest | Colchester United |
| 6 August 2025 | 30 June 2026 | Rento Takaoka | Southampton | Valenciennes |
| 7 August 2025 | 30 June 2026 | Jens Cajuste | Napoli | Ipswich Town |
| 7 August 2025 | 30 June 2026 | Modou Faal | Wrexham | Port Vale |
| 7 August 2025 | 30 June 2026 | Ivo Grbić | Sheffield United | Fatih Karagümrük |
| 7 August 2025 | 30 June 2026 | Logan Pye | Burnley | Accrington Stanley |
| 7 August 2025 | 30 June 2026 | Cieran Slicker | Ipswich Town | Barnet |
| 8 August 2025 | 30 June 2026 | Max Alleyne | Manchester City | Watford |
| 8 August 2025 | 30 June 2026 | James Berry | Wycombe Wanderers | Chesterfield |
| 8 August 2025 | 30 June 2026 | Alfie Lloyd | Queens Park Rangers | Leyton Orient |
| 8 August 2025 | 30 June 2026 | Yang Min-hyeok | Tottenham Hotspur | Portsmouth |
| 9 August 2025 | 30 June 2026 | Joe Gelhardt | Leeds United | Hull City |
| 9 August 2025 | 30 June 2026 | Mateo Joseph | Leeds United | Mallorca |
| 10 August 2025 | 30 June 2026 | Chuba Akpom | Ajax | Ipswich Town |
| 11 August 2025 | 30 June 2026 | Princewill Ehibhatiomhan | Southampton | Swindon Town |
| 11 August 2025 | 30 June 2026 | Joe Gauci | Aston Villa | Port Vale |
| 11 August 2025 | 30 June 2026 | James Golding | Oxford United | Crewe Alexandra |
| 11 August 2025 | 30 June 2026 | Tommy McDermott | Burnley | Shrewsbury Town |
| 11 August 2025 | 30 June 2026 | Charlie Olson | Blackburn Rovers | Oldham Athletic |
| 11 August 2025 | 30 June 2026 | Terry Taylor | Charlton Athletic | Northampton Town |
| 12 August 2025 | 30 June 2026 | Daniel Bachmann | Watford | Deportivo La Coruña |
| 12 August 2025 | 30 June 2026 | Jack Grealish | Manchester City | Everton |
| 13 August 2025 | 30 June 2026 | Ibrahim Cissoko | Toulouse | Bolton Wanderers |
| 13 August 2025 | 30 June 2026 | Arijanet Muric | Ipswich Town | Sassuolo |
| 13 August 2025 | 30 June 2026 | Sebastian Revan | Wrexham | Burton Albion |
| 14 August 2025 | 30 June 2026 | Gassan Ahadme | Charlton Athletic | Stevenage |
| 14 August 2025 | 30 June 2026 | Kacper Łopata | Barnsley | Bristol Rovers |
| 14 August 2025 | 30 June 2026 | Malick Yalcouyé | Brighton & Hove Albion | Swansea City |
| 15 August 2025 | 30 June 2026 | Toby Collyer | Manchester United | West Bromwich Albion |
| 15 August 2025 | 30 June 2026 | Kaheim Dixon | Charlton Athletic | Crawley Town |
| 15 August 2025 | 30 June 2026 | Kerr Smith | Aston Villa | Barrow |
| 18 August 2025 | 30 June 2026 | Ryan Finnigan | Blackpool | Walsall |
| 18 August 2025 | 30 June 2026 | Kylian Kouassi | Blackpool | Cambridge United |
| 18 August 2025 | 30 June 2026 | Alex Mitchell | Charlton Athletic | Plymouth Argyle |
| 18 August 2025 | 30 June 2026 | Francis Okoronkwo | Everton | Lincoln City |
| 18 August 2025 | 30 June 2026 | Martin Sherif | Everton | Rotherham United |
| 19 August 2025 | 30 June 2026 | Jayden Joseph | Leicester City | Tranmere Rovers |
| 19 August 2025 | 30 June 2026 | Sverre Nypan | Manchester City | Middlesbrough |
| 20 August 2025 | 30 June 2026 | Leon Bailey | Aston Villa | Roma |
| 20 August 2025 | 1 November 2025 | Adilson Malanda | Middlesbrough | Charlotte FC |
| 21 August 2025 | 30 June 2026 | Douglas Luiz | Juventus | Nottingham Forest |
| 21 August 2025 | 30 June 2026 | Paddy Madden | Chesterfield | Accrington Stanley |
| 21 August 2025 | 31 December 2025 | Andrew Moran | Brighton & Hove Albion | Los Angeles FC |
| 22 August 2025 | 30 June 2026 | Geraldo Bajrami | Burton Albion | Crawley Town |
| 22 August 2025 | 30 June 2026 | Lewis Dobbin | Aston Villa | Preston North End |
| 22 August 2025 | 30 June 2026 | Ben Godfrey | Atalanta | Sheffield United |
| 22 August 2025 | 31 December 2025 | Ethan Horvath | Cardiff City | Sheffield Wednesday |
| 22 August 2025 | 30 June 2026 | Daniel Kanu | Charlton Athletic | Walsall |
| 22 August 2025 | 30 June 2026 | Peter Kioso | Oxford United | Peterborough United |
| 22 August 2025 | 30 June 2026 | Lewis Koumas | Liverpool | Birmingham City |
| 22 August 2025 | 30 June 2026 | Luis Sinisterra | Bournemouth | Cruzeiro |
| 22 August 2025 | 30 June 2026 | Jemiah Umolu | Crystal Palace | Bromley |
| 23 August 2025 | 30 June 2026 | Edson Álvarez | West Ham United | Fenerbahçe |
| 25 August 2025 | 30 June 2026 | Žan Celar | Queens Park Rangers | Fortuna Düsseldorf |
| 25 August 2025 | 30 June 2026 | George Long | Norwich City | Southampton |
| 25 August 2025 | 30 June 2026 | Rhys Norrington-Davies | Sheffield United | Queens Park Rangers |
| 26 August 2025 | 30 June 2026 | Jon Mellish | Wigan Athletic | Milton Keynes Dons |
| 26 August 2025 | 30 June 2026 | Clarke Oduor | Bradford City | Grimsby Town |
| 26 August 2025 | 30 June 2026 | Yukinari Sugawara | Southampton | Werder Bremen |
| 27 August 2025 | 30 June 2026 | Aarón Anselmino | Chelsea | Borussia Dortmund |
| 27 August 2025 | 30 June 2026 | Armel Bella-Kotchap | Southampton | Hellas Verona |
| 27 August 2025 | 30 June 2026 | Dajaune Brown | Derby County | Port Vale |
| 27 August 2025 | 30 June 2026 | Matt Targett | Newcastle United | Middlesbrough |
| 28 August 2025 | 30 June 2026 | Iván Azón | Como | Ipswich Town |
| 28 August 2025 | 30 June 2026 | Ladislav Krejčí | Girona | Wolverhampton Wanderers |
| 29 August 2025 | 30 June 2026 | Harvey Araujo | Fulham | Colchester United |
| 29 August 2025 | 30 June 2026 | Jamal Baptiste | Sheffield United | Rotherham United |
| 29 August 2025 | 30 June 2026 | Bradley Collins | Coventry City | Burton Albion |
| 29 August 2025 | 30 June 2026 | Brodi Hughes | Chelsea | AFC Wimbledon |
| 29 August 2025 | 30 June 2026 | Ismeal Kabia | Arsenal | Shrewsbury Town |
| 29 August 2025 | 30 June 2026 | Nicolás Siri | Montevideo City Torque | Salford City |
| 30 August 2025 | 30 June 2026 | Jesper Daland | Cardiff City | Fortuna Düsseldorf |
| 30 August 2025 | 30 June 2026 | Aimar Govea | Swansea City | Girona |
| 30 August 2025 | 6 January 2026 | Toyosi Olusanya | Houston Dynamo | Doncaster Rovers |
| 31 August 2025 | 30 June 2026 | Neto Borges | Middlesbrough | Bristol City |
| 31 August 2025 | 30 June 2026 | Ben Brereton Díaz | Southampton | Derby County |
| 31 August 2025 | 30 June 2026 | Elias Jelert | Galatasaray | Southampton |
| 31 August 2025 | 30 June 2026 | Kostas Tsimikas | Liverpool | Roma |
| 1 September 2025 | 30 June 2026 | Manuel Akanji | Manchester City | Inter Milan |
| 1 September 2025 | 31 December 2025 | Travis Akomeah | Watford | Gillingham |
| 1 September 2025 | 30 June 2026 | Will Alves | Leicester City | Huddersfield Town |
| 1 September 2025 | 31 December 2025 | Harry Amass | Manchester United | Sheffield Wednesday |
| 1 September 2025 | 30 June 2026 | Harrison Armstrong | Everton | Preston North End |
| 1 September 2025 | 30 June 2026 | Thierno Ballo | Wolsberger | Millwall |
| 1 September 2025 | 30 June 2026 | Scott Banks | FC St. Pauli | Blackpool |
| 1 September 2025 | 30 June 2026 | Finley Barbrook | Ipswich Town | Lincoln City |
| 1 September 2025 | 31 December 2025 | Jack Barrett | Blackburn Rovers | Tranmere Rovers |
| 1 September 2025 | 30 June 2026 | Norman Bassette | Coventry City | Reims |
| 1 September 2025 | 30 June 2026 | Sam Bell | Bristol City | Wycombe Wanderers |
| 1 September 2025 | 31 December 2025 | Sammy Braybrooke | Leicester City | Newport County |
| 1 September 2025 | 31 December 2025 | James Bree | Southampton | Charlton Athletic |
| 1 September 2025 | 30 June 2026 | Alan Browne | Sunderland | Middlesbrough |
| 1 September 2025 | 30 June 2026 | Facundo Buonanotte | Brighton & Hove Albion | Chelsea |
| 1 September 2025 | 30 June 2026 | Julián Carranza | Feyenoord | Leicester City |
| 1 September 2025 | 30 June 2026 | Conor Chaplin | Ipswich Town | Portsmouth |
| 1 September 2025 | 30 June 2026 | Samuel Chukwueze | Milan | Fulham |
| 1 September 2025 | 30 June 2026 | Ollie Cooper | Swansea City | Wigan Athletic |
| 1 September 2025 | 30 June 2026 | Joel Cotterill | Swansea City | Bristol Rovers |
| 1 September 2025 | 30 June 2026 | Eric da Silva Moreira | Nottingham Forest | Rio Ave |
| 1 September 2025 | 30 June 2026 | Will Dickson | Manchester City | Chesterfield |
| 1 September 2025 | 30 June 2026 | Harvey Elliott | Liverpool | Aston Villa |
| 1 September 2025 | 30 June 2026 | Bilal El Khannouss | Leicester City | VfB Stuttgart |
| 1 September 2025 | 30 June 2026 | Ethan Ennis | Manchester United | Fleetwood Town |
| 1 September 2025 | 30 June 2026 | Marcus Forss | Middlesbrough | Bolton Wanderers |
| 1 September 2025 | 30 June 2026 | Taylor Gardner-Hickman | Birmingham City | Blackburn Rovers |
| 1 September 2025 | 30 June 2026 | Lutsharel Geertruida | RB Leipzig | Sunderland |
| 1 September 2025 | 30 June 2026 | Josh Gordon | Walsall | Barrow |
| 1 September 2025 | 30 June 2026 | Amir Hadžiahmetović | Beşiktaş | Hull City |
| 1 September 2025 | 30 June 2026 | Isaac Heath | Everton | Accrington Stanley |
| 1 September 2025 | 30 June 2026 | Akeel Higgins | West Bromwich Albion | Exeter City |
| 1 September 2025 | 30 June 2026 | Piero Hincapié | Bayer Leverkusen | Arsenal |
| 1 September 2025 | 30 June 2026 | Rasmus Højlund | Manchester United | Napoli |
| 1 September 2025 | 30 June 2026 | Niall Huggins | Sunderland | Wycombe Wanderers |
| 1 September 2025 | 30 June 2026 | Bradley Ihionvien | Peterborough United | Shrewsbury Town |
| 1 September 2025 | 30 June 2026 | Jordan James | Rennes | Leicester City |
| 1 September 2025 | 30 June 2026 | Igor Julio | Brighton & Hove Albion | West Ham United |
| 1 September 2025 | 30 June 2026 | Samuel Iling-Junior | Aston Villa | West Bromwich Albion |
| 1 September 2025 | 30 June 2026 | Freddie Issaka | Plymouth Argyle | Bristol Rovers |
| 1 September 2025 | 30 June 2026 | Nicolas Jackson | Chelsea | Bayern Munich |
| 1 September 2025 | 30 June 2026 | Álex Jiménez | Milan | Bournemouth |
| 1 September 2025 | 30 June 2026 | Abu Kamara | Hull City | Getafe |
| 1 September 2025 | 30 June 2026 | Omari Kellyman | Chelsea | Cardiff City |
| 1 September 2025 | 30 June 2026 | Jakub Kiwior | Arsenal | Porto |
| 1 September 2025 | 30 June 2026 | Randal Kolo Muani | Paris Saint-Germain | Tottenham Hotspur |
| 1 September 2025 | 30 June 2026 | Filip Krastev | Lommel | Oxford United |
| 1 September 2025 | 30 June 2026 | Jonah Kusi-Asare | Bayern Munich | Fulham |
| 1 September 2025 | 30 June 2026 | Ryan Loft | Cambridge United | Crawley Town |
| 1 September 2025 | 30 June 2026 | Florentino Luís | Benfica | Burnley |
| 1 September 2025 | 30 June 2026 | Adam Mayor | Millwall | Cambridge United |
| 1 September 2025 | 30 June 2026 | Micah Mbick | Charlton Athletic | Colchester United |
| 1 September 2025 | 30 June 2026 | Law McCabe | Middlesbrough | Plymouth Argyle |
| 1 September 2025 | 30 June 2026 | Tom McIntyre | Portsmouth | Bradford City |
| 1 September 2025 | 30 June 2026 | Donnell McNeilly | Nottingham Forest | Wycombe Wanderers |
| 1 September 2025 | 30 June 2026 | Michael Mellon | Burnley | Oldham Athletic |
| 1 September 2025 | 30 June 2026 | Formose Mendy | Lorient | Watford |
| 1 September 2025 | 30 June 2026 | Jay Mingi | Stockport County | Crewe Alexandra |
| 1 September 2025 | 30 June 2026 | Jimmy-Jay Morgan | Chelsea | Peterborough United |
| 1 September 2025 | 30 June 2026 | Adam Murphy | Bristol City | Swindon Town |
| 1 September 2025 | 30 June 2026 | Stephan Negru | Oxford United | Bristol Rovers |
| 1 September 2025 | 30 June 2026 | Reiss Nelson | Arsenal | Fulham |
| 1 September 2025 | 30 June 2026 | Lucas Nygaard | Arsenal | Brabrand |
| 1 September 2025 | 30 June 2026 | Justin Obikwu | Coventry City | Lincoln City |
| 1 September 2025 | 30 June 2026 | Chiedozie Ogbene | Ipswich Town | Sheffield United |
| 1 September 2025 | 30 June 2026 | Jid Okeke | Stockport County | Walsall |
| 1 September 2025 | 30 June 2026 | Tyler Onyango | Everton | Stockport County |
| 1 September 2025 | 31 December 2025 | Nathan Opoku | Leicester City | Newport County |
| 1 September 2025 | 30 June 2026 | Lewis Orford | West Ham United | Stevenage |
| 1 September 2025 | 30 June 2026 | Aaron Ramsey | Burnley | Leicester City |
| 1 September 2025 | 30 June 2026 | Zépiqueno Redmond | Aston Villa | Huddersfield Town |
| 1 September 2025 | 30 June 2026 | Junior Robinson | West Ham United | Livingston |
| 1 September 2025 | 30 June 2026 | Merlin Röhl | SC Freiburg | Everton |
| 1 September 2025 | 30 June 2026 | Tyler Roberts | Birmingham City | Mansfield Town |
| 1 September 2025 | 30 June 2026 | Jake Rooney | Derby County | Barnsley |
| 1 September 2025 | 30 June 2026 | Lakyle Samuel | Manchester City | Bromley |
| 1 September 2025 | 30 June 2026 | Ishé Samuels-Smith | Chelsea | Swansea City |
| 1 September 2025 | 30 June 2026 | Jadon Sancho | Manchester United | Aston Villa |
| 1 September 2025 | 30 June 2026 | Jeremy Sarmiento | Brighton & Hove Albion | Cremonese |
| 1 September 2025 | 30 June 2026 | Szabolcs Schön | Bolton Wanderers | Győr |
| 1 September 2025 | 30 June 2026 | Sam Sherring | Milton Keynes Dons | Cheltenham Town |
| 1 September 2025 | 30 June 2026 | Jacob Slater | Brighton & Hove Albion | Harrogate Town |
| 1 September 2025 | 30 June 2026 | Will Smallbone | Southampton | Millwall |
| 1 September 2025 | 30 June 2026 | Jonny Smith | Wigan Athletic | Gillingham |
| 1 September 2025 | 30 June 2026 | Manor Solomon | Tottenham Hotspur | Villarreal |
| 1 September 2025 | 30 June 2026 | Ronnie Stutter | Chelsea | Barnet |
| 1 September 2025 | 30 June 2026 | Mahamadou Susoho | Manchester City | Livingston |
| 1 September 2025 | 30 June 2026 | Charlie Taylor | Southampton | West Bromwich Albion |
| 1 September 2025 | 30 June 2026 | Fábio Vieira | Arsenal | Hamburger SV |
| 1 September 2025 | 30 June 2026 | Ben Winterburn | Bournemouth | Barnet |
| 1 September 2025 | 30 June 2026 | Cauley Woodrow | Luton Town | Wycombe Wanderers |
| 1 September 2025 | 30 June 2026 | Oleksandr Zinchenko | Arsenal | Nottingham Forest |
