= Transfer window =

Time of year when footballers can change clubs

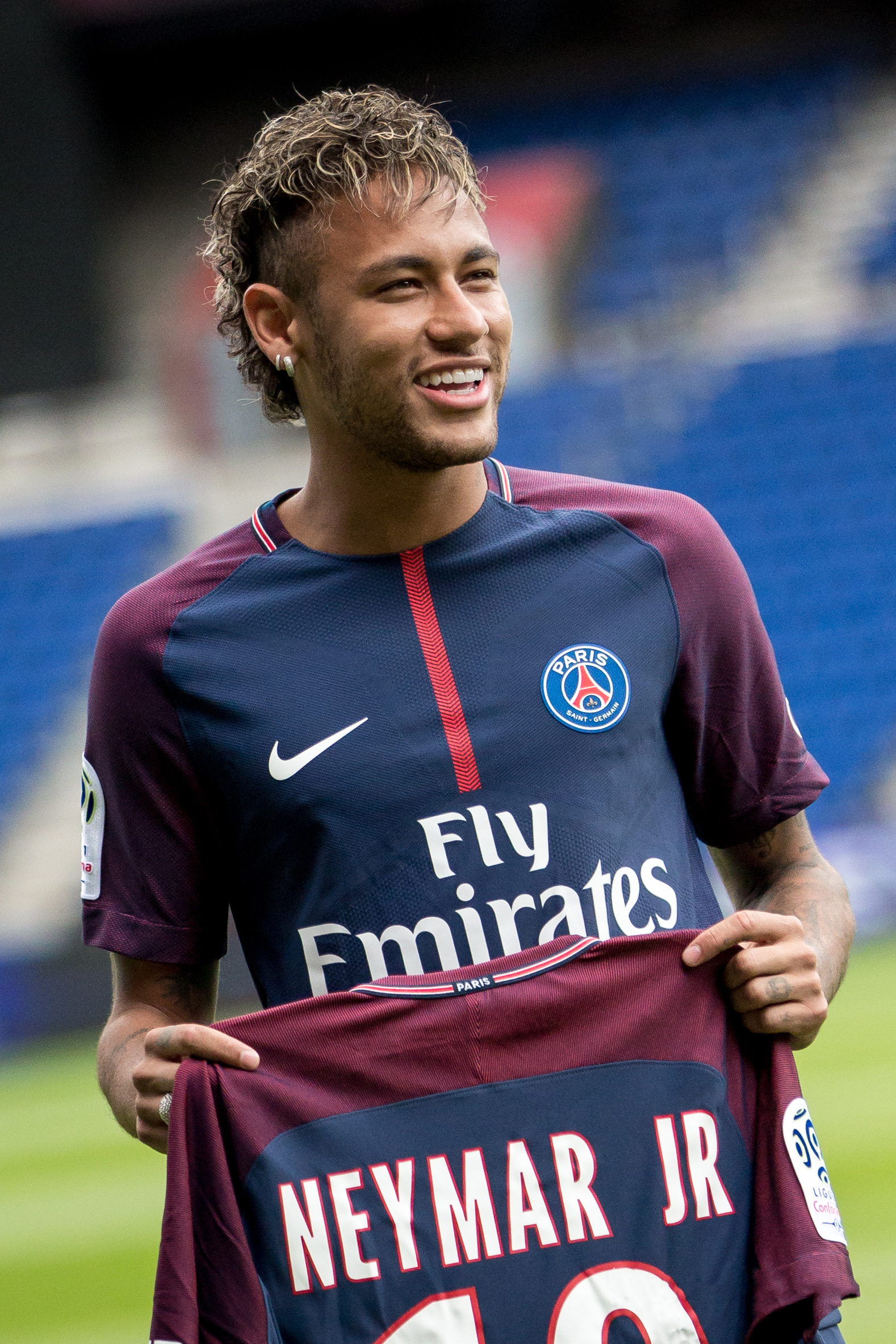
Neymar joining Paris Saint-Germain for €222 million in the summer transfer window of 2017 was the most expensive transfer in association football history.

In association football, a transfer window is the period during the year in which a club can add players to their squad who were previously under contract with another club. Such a transfer is completed by registering the player into the new club through FIFA. "Transfer window" is the unofficial term commonly used by the media for the concept of "registration period" as described in the FIFA Regulations on the Status and Transfer of Players. According to the rules, each national football association decides on the time (such as the dates) of the 'window' but it may not exceed 12 weeks. The second registration period occurs during the season and may not exceed four weeks.

The transfer window of a given football association governs only international transfers into that football association. International transfers out of an association are always possible to those associations that have an open window. The transfer window of the association that the player is leaving does not have to be open.

The window was introduced in response to negotiations with the European Commission. The system had been used in many European leagues before being brought into compulsory effect by FIFA during the 2002–03 season. English football was initially behind the plans when they were proposed in the early 1990s, in the hope that it would improve teams' stability and prevent agents from searching for deals all year around, but by the time it was eventually introduced they had to be persuaded that it would work. However, the exact regulations and possible exceptions are established by each competition's governing body rather than by the national football association.

== Current schedules and exceptions ==
FIFA regulates in general that there shall be two windows, a longer one (max. twelve weeks) in the break between seasons and a shorter one (max. one month) in the middle of a season. The specific periods depend on the league's season cycle and are determined by the national football authorities.

Most major European leagues commence in the second half of the year (e.g. August or September) and stretch over two calendar years to the first half of the next year (e.g. May), resulting in a close season window in the summer ending in August, and a mid-season window in January.

The periods are different when a league runs throughout a single calendar year, as in most Nordic countries due to weather constraints, Major League Soccer due to both weather and competition from other locally popular sports (notably basketball and American football), or as the traditional season in the Southern Hemisphere. The first window generally opens from 1 March until midnight of 30 April, followed by the in-season window from 1 to 31 August.

| Pre-season window | Mid-season window | Associations |
|---|---|---|
| 1 January – 31 March | 14 July – 13 August (2023) | Brazil |
| 5 January – 29 March | 15 July – 14 August | Japan |
| 8 January – 31 March | 15 July – 11 August | Sweden |
| 30 January – 31 March | 14 July – 2 September | Norway |
| 12 January – 12 March | 20 June – 19 July | Lithuania |
| 24 January – 12 March | 1 July – 1 September | Ukraine |
| 10 February – 4 May | 7 July – 4 August | United States and Canada |
| 1 March – 30 April | 1–31 August | Finland |
| 1 June – 18 August | 1–19 January | Albania |
| 9 June – 31 August | 1–31 January | India |
| 9 June – 1 September | 1 January – 1 February | Scotland |
| 10 June – 31 August | 18 January – 15 February | Switzerland |
| 10 June – 30 August | 1 January–3 February | France |
| 11 June – 2 September | 3–31 January | Netherlands |
| 1 – 10 June, 16 June – 1 September | 1 – 31 January | England |
| 1 July – 1 September (2023) | 3–31 January (2022) | Italy |
| 1 July – 1 September (2023) | 1–31 January (2022) | Germany |
| 1 July – 1 September (2023) | 1 January – 2 February | Spain |
| 1 July – 4 September (2023) | | Poland |
| 1 July – 6 September (2023) | | Belgium |
| 26 July – 17 October (2020) | | Russia |
| 24 July – 15 October | 3–31 January | Australia |
| 1 December – 31 January | 1–30 June | Kenya, Uganda |

Although, in England, transfers between clubs in the same league can take place as soon as the last competitive fixtures for the season have been played, many transfers will not be completed until 1 July because many players' contracts expire on 30 June. International transfers into the English leagues (including the Premier League) cannot be made until the window has opened on 17 May. Outside the transfer window, a club may still sign players on an emergency basis, usually if they have no goalkeeper available. Special dispensation from their competition's governing body, for example the Premier League, is required. The transfer window restriction does not apply to clubs in or below the National League division.

If the last day of a transfer window is on a weekend, the deadline can be extended to the following Monday at the request of those involved for business reasons. The first shift of the deadline since its inception took place in summer 2008, when the deadline was extended by 24 hours to fall on Monday 1 September at midnight. The transfer deadline in England was similarly extended to 5 pm 1 September 2009, due to the August Bank Holiday. The German football league announced an extension of the January 2009 deadline to 2 February.

Free agents can be signed by a club at any time during the season, if they had been released by their previous club before the end of the transfer window. A club can request to sign a player on emergency basis, e.g. if several goalkeepers are injured at the same time. Outside the transfer window in England, once seven days have passed following the end of a transfer window, clubs from the English Football League (Regulation 53.3.4) and (provided the player is not registered with a club from any league below the National League division) National League division (Rule 6.6.4) can loan in players i) in the first half of the season, until 5.00pm on the fourth Thursday in November and ii) in the second half of the season, until 5.00pm on the fourth Thursday in March. An existing loan deal can be made permanent at any time outside the transfer window.

The day upon which a window closes is known as transfer deadline day, and is usually one of the busiest days of the window, generating a flurry of transfers, often because a number of interdependent transfers are completed resembling a housing chain, generating much media interest.

== Calls to end or reform the transfer window ==
Steve Coppell, former manager of Reading in England's Premier League, and others have called for the transfer window to be scrapped in favour of the previous system, under which transfers could take place throughout the season other than in the closing weeks. Coppell said that the transfer window breeds panic and encourages "scurrilous" transfer activity adding that "I cannot see the logic in a transfer window. It brings on a fire-sale mentality, causes unrest via the media and means clubs buy too many players" adding that "The old system, where if you had a problem you could look at loans or make a short-term purchase, was far better than this system we have at the moment". Former England Manager Sven-Göran Eriksson has also questioned the value of the transfer window, commenting: "You do wonder at times if it is right to have a window, it was easier when it was open all the time and perhaps fairer for the players. I am sure much of the business being done on the last day is a little bit desperate and that is not right. I think it was better before, but then I am old".

In January 2013 Arsenal manager Arsène Wenger asked for the January transfer window to be limited to two transfers per window and claimed it is "unfair" in its current form. He cited Newcastle United transfer activity as an example. The following year, Wenger hit out at Manchester United's £37 million purchase of Juan Mata from rivals Chelsea. Wenger argued that the transfer was unfair because United and Chelsea had already played each other twice during the season, but United would still have to play Arsenal, and said that "the rules should be adapted more for fairness". Manchester City manager Manuel Pellegrini backed the sentiment of Wenger, disagreeing that a player "can go from one team to another team in the same league at this part of the year" and also said that the winter transfer window was unbalanced in favour of big clubs, saying "a club with money can take the best players from the other teams".

Former Crystal Palace manager Alan Pardew questioned why the Premier League transfer window remains open after the start of the season after Arsenal made a bid for midfielder Yohan Cabaye during his time as Newcastle United manager in August 2013.

In January 2015, FIFPro said that the current transfer window system is "failing football and its players", one of the main issues being that players are released from clubs without explanation or compensation.

== See also ==
- Trade deadline
