= Jack Stevens (footballer, born 2000) =

English footballer (born 2000)

Personal information
- Full name: Jack Finlay Stevens
- Date of birth: 14 December 2000 (age 25)
- Position: Winger

Team information
- Current team: Oldham Athletic

Senior career*
Years	Team	Apps	(Gls)
2019-2021	Oxford United	0	(0)
2021-2023	Banbury United	20	(24)
2023-2025	Solihull Moors	71	(24)
2025-	Oldham Athletic	19	(6)
- * Club domestic league appearances and goals as of 11:17, 23 May 2026 (BST)

Jack Finlay Stevens (born 14 December 2000) is a Welsh professional footballer who plays as a winger for EFL League Two club Oldham Athletic.

== Career ==
Stevens was a scholar at Oxford United and signed a professional contract with the club in October 2020. He was released without making an appearance at the end of the 2020/21 season and joined Banbury United on 5 October 2021.

After helping Banbury United to promotion from the Southern Football League Premier Division Central, Stevens joined Solihull Moors in March 2023.

After two full seasons in the National League with Solihull Moors, Stevens signed a two-year contract with League Two side Oldham Athletic in July 2025.

He made his debut for Oldham in an opening-day draw with MK Dons and, after an injury plagued season, finished with 6 goals from 22 appearances in all competitions.

== Style of play ==
According to his Oldham manager, Micky Mellon, Stevens is a player with pace, directness and an eye for goal.

== Career statistics ==
As of match played 2 May 2026

Appearances and goals by club, season and competition
Club	Season	League			FA Cup		EFL Cup		Other		Total	
Club	Season	Division	Apps	Goals	Apps	Goals	Apps	Goals	Apps	Goals	Apps	Goals
Banbury United	2021–22	Southern Premier Division Central	12	15	1	0	0	0	0	0	13	15
Banbury United	2022–23	National League North	8	9	0	0	0	0	0	0	8	9
Banbury United	Total		20	24	1	0	0	0	0	0	21	24
Solihull Moors	2022–23	National League	8	1	0	0	0	0	0	0	8	1
Solihull Moors	2023–24	National League	36	10	0	0	0	0	3 (Note: Appearances in the FA Trophy)	4	39	14
Solihull Moors	2024–25	National League	27	13	2	1	0	0	0	0	29	14
Solihull Moors	Total		71	24	2	1	0	0	3	4	76	29
Oldham Athletic	2025–26	League Two	19	6	1	0	1	0	1 (Note: Appearances in the EFL Trophy)	0	22	6
Oldham Athletic	Total		19	6	1	0	1	0	1	0	22	6
Career total			110	54	4	1	1	0	4	4	119	59
