= List of Banbury United F.C. seasons =

Banbury United is a football club based in Banbury, Oxfordshire, who play in the Southern League Premier Division. They are nicknamed The Puritans and they play their home matches at the Spencer Stadium. They were originally named Spencer Villa.

== Key ==
Top scorer and number of goals scored shown in bold when he was also top scorer for the division.

Key to league record

- Lvl = Level of the league in the current league system
- S = Numbers of seasons
- Pld = Games played
- W = Games won
- D = Games drawn
- L = Games lost
- GF = Goals for
- GA = Goals against
- GD = Goals difference
- Pts = Points
- Position = Position in the final league table
- Overall position = Overall club position in the English league system

Key to cup records

- Res = Final reached round
- Rec = Final club record in the form of wins-draws-losses
- PR = Premilinary round
- QR1 = Qualifying round 1
- QR2 = Qualifying round 2
- QR3 = Qualifying round 3
- QR4 = Qualifying round 4
- R1 = Round 1
- R2 = Round 2
- R3 = Round 3
- R4 = Round 4
- R5 = Round 5
- R6 = Round 6
- QF = Quarter-finals
- SF = Semi-finals
- RU = Runners-up
- W = Winners
- Average home attendance = for league games only

== Seasons ==
Year	League														Cup competitions						Manager
Year	Division	Lvl	Pld	W	D	L	GF	GA	GD	Pts	Position	Leading league scorer		Average attendance	FA Cup		FA Trophy		FA Vase		Manager
Year	Division	Lvl	Pld	W	D	L	GF	GA	GD	Pts	Position	Name	Goals	Average attendance	Res	Rec	Res	Rec	Res	Rec	Manager
No competitive football was played between 1939 and 1946 due to the World War II
1945–46	**Birmingham Combination**		32	10	7	15	56	79	-23	27	**13th of 17**				QR2	3-0-1	–		–		Jimmy Cringan
1946–47	**Birmingham Combination**		36	15	6	15	86	65	21	36	**10th of 19**				PR	0-0-1	–		–		Jimmy Cringan
1947–48	**Birmingham Combination**		38	29	3	6	106	42	64	61	**2nd of 20**				R1	6-0-1	–		–		Jimmy Cringan
1948–49	**Birmingham Combination**		38	15	10	13	75	68	7	40	**10th of 20**				QR3	3-0-1	–		–		Jimmy Cringan
1949–50	**Birmingham Combination**		38	19	5	14	63	52	11	43	**8th of 20**				PR	0-0-1	–		–		Jimmy Cringan
1950–51	**Birmingham Combination**		38	13	8	17	64	75	-11	34	**12th of 20**				QR2	3-2-1	–		–		Jimmy Cringan
1951–52	**Birmingham Combination**		38	13	7	18	76	87	-11	33	**15th of 20**				QR2	1-0-1	–		–		Jimmy Cringan
1952–53	**Birmingham Combination**		34	12	6	16	73	65	8	30	**13th of 18**				PR	0-1-1	–		–		Jimmy Cringan
1953–54	**Birmingham Combination**		26	14	4	8	49	36	13	32	**4th of 14**				QR2	2-0-1	–		–		Jimmy Cringan
Joined the Birmingham & District League
1954–55	**Birmingham & District League**		38	20	11	7	84	42	42	51	**4th of 20**				QR1	1-0-1	–		–		Jimmy Cringan
1955–56	**Birmingham & District League**		38	23	6	9	68	40	28	52	**3rd of 20**				QR3	2-0-1	–		–		Jimmy Cringan
1956–57	**Birmingham & District League**		38	17	7	14	87	71	16	41	**7th of 20**				QR1	1-0-1	–		–		Jimmy Cringan
1957–58	**Birmingham & District League**		38	18	4	16	76	63	13	40	**9th of 20**				QR1	0-0-1	–		–		Jimmy Cringan
1958–59	**Birmingham & District League**		34	15	6	13	59	55	4	36	**7th of 18**				PR	0-0-1	–		–		Jimmy Cringan
1959–60	**Birmingham & District League**		34	10	7	17	60	71	-11	27	**14th of 18**				QR2	1-0-1	–		–		Jimmy Cringan
1960–61	**Birmingham & District League**		42	21	5	16	108	92	16	47	**10th of 22**				QR1	0-0-1	–		–		Jimmy Cringan
1961–62	**Birmingham & District League**		40	18	8	14	107	84	23	44	**10th of 21**				R1	5-0-1	–		–		
The league renamed
1962–63	**West Midlands (Regional) League**		38	15	4	19	86	86	0	34	**13th of 20**				QR1	0-0-1	–		–		
1963–64	**West Midlands (Regional) League**		36	16	6	14	65	69	-4	38	**9th of 19**				QR2	1-0-1	–		–		
1964–65	**West Midlands (Regional) League**		38	11	3	24	79	99	-20	25	**15th of 20**				QR1	0-0-1	–		–		
Club renamed **Banbury United**
1965–66	**West Midlands (Regional) League**		40	23	9	8	91	55	36	55	**3rd of 21**				QR2	1-0-1	–		–		Len Goulden
Joined the Southern Football League
1966–67	**Southern Football League**; **Division One**	6	46	13	14	19	88	100	-12	40	**17th of 24**				QR2	1-0-1	–		–		Len Goulden
1967–68	**Southern Football League**; **Division One**	6	42	22	9	11	79	59	20	53	**7th of 22**				QR4	3-0-1	–		–		
1968–69	**Southern Football League**; **Division One**	6	42	16	12	14	67	72	-5	44	**11th of 22**				QR2	2-0-1	–		–		
1969–70	**Southern Football League**; **Division One**	6	42	19	8	15	86	72	14	46	**9th of 22**				QR2	1-0-1	QR2	1-1-1	–		
1970–71	**Southern Football League**; **Division One**	6	38	13	11	14	58	53	5	37	**12th of 20**				QR2	1-0-1	R3	5-2-1	–		
Division One split into two sections
1971–72	**Southern Football League**; **Division One North**	6	34	14	5	15	54	46	8	33	**10th of 18**				QR1	0-1-1	R1	1-0-1	–		
1972–73	**Southern Football League**; **Division One North**	6	42	18	5	19	60	53	7	41	**12th of 22**				R1	4-2-1	R1	1-1-1	–		
1973–74	**Southern Football League**; **Division One North**	6	42	19	11	12	69	57	12	49	**8th of 22**				R1	4-3-1	R3	3-3-1	–		
1974–75	**Southern Football League**; **Division One North**	6	42	18	10	14	52	51	1	46	**10th of 22**				QR1	0-0-1	R1	0-2-1	–		
1975–76	**Southern Football League**; **Division One North**	6	42	15	8	19	58	67	-9	38	**12th of 22**				QR2	1-0-1	R1	0-0-1	–		
1976–77	**Southern Football League**; **Division One North**	6	38	15	10	13	51	47	4	40	**9th of 20**				QR3	2-0-1	R1	1-0-1	–		
1977–78	**Southern Football League**; **Division One North**	6	38	17	10	11	52	47	5	44	**6th of 20**				QR4	4-2-1	R1	1-0-1	–		
1978–79	**Southern Football League**; **Division One North**	6	38	10	13	15	42	58	-16	33	**15th of 20**				QR2	2-0-1	QR3	0-0-1	–		
Alliance Premier League created, The Premier Division was disbanded as most of the clubs left to join the new league, while the divisions One were renamed
1979–80	**Southern Football League**; **Midland Division**	6	42	13	14	15	56	56	0	40	**13th of 22**				QR1	2-0-1	QR1	0-1-1	–		
1980–81	**Southern Football League**; **Midland Division**	6	42	11	11	20	51	65	-14	33	**16th of 22**				QR4	3-1-1	QR2	1-0-1	–		
1981–82	**Southern Football League**; **Midland Division**	6	42	11	8	23	63	91	-28	30	**18th of 22**				QR2	1-1-1	QR1	0-0-1	–		
Southern Football League Premier Division recreated, the club did not qualified to be placed to the Premier Division
1982–83	**Southern Football League**; **Midland Division**	7	32	15	3	14	59	55	4	48	**7th of 17**				QR1	0-0-1	PR	0-0-1	–		
1983–84	**Southern Football League**; **Midland Division**	7	38	6	11	21	37	78	-41	29	**18th of 20**				PR	0-0-1	QR1	1-1-1	–		Phil Lines
1984–85	**Southern Football League**; **Midland Division**	7	34	9	5	20	33	59	-26	32	**17th of 18**				QR1	0-0-1	PR	0-0-1	–		Phil Lines
1985–86	**Southern Football League**; **Midland Division**	7	40	13	8	19	38	55	-17	47	**17th of 21**				PR	0-0-1	QR2	1-0-1	–		Phil Lines
1986–87	**Southern Football League**; **Midland Division**	7	38	14	7	17	55	65	-10	49	**12th of 20**				QR2	2-0-1	QR1	0-0-1	–		Phil Lines
1987–88	**Southern Football League**; **Midland Division**	7	42	17	7	18	48	46	2	58	**10th of 22**				QR1	1-0-1	R1	3-2-1	–		Phil Lines
1988–89	**Southern Football League**; **Midland Division**	7	42	10	14	18	53	74	-21	44	**16th of 22**				QR3	3-2-1	QR1	0-0-1	–		
1989–90	**Southern Football League**; **Midland Division**	7	42	9	9	24	46	83	-37	34 (Note: Banbury United were deducted two points.)	**21st of 22**; Relegated				QR1	0-0-1	QR2	1-0-1	–		Colin Holder
1990–91	**Hellenic Football League**; **Premier Division**	8	34	17	4	13	58	51	7	55	**8th of 18**				PR	0-3-1	R1	0-0-1	–		Colin Holder
1991–92	**Hellenic Football League**; **Premier Division**	8	34	14	5	15	55	55	0	47	**10th of 18**				QR2	2-1-1	–		PR	0-1-1	
1992–93	**Hellenic Football League**; **Premier Division**	8	34	10	10	14	50	66	-16	40	**11th of 18**				PR	0-0-1	–		R1	1-1-1	
1993–94	**Hellenic Football League**; **Premier Division**	8	34	18	9	7	74	44	+30	63	**3rd of 18**				PR	0-0-1	–		PR	0-0-1	
1994–95	**Hellenic Football League**; **Premier Division**	8	30	12	7	11	44	44	0	43	**8th of 16**				PR	0-0-1	–		R1	1-0-1	
1995–96	**Hellenic Football League**; **Premier Division**	8	34	8	6	20	40	66	-26	30	**15th of 18**				PR	0-1-1	–		R1	1-1-1	
1996–97	**Hellenic Football League**; **Premier Division**	8	34	14	5	15	51	46	5	47	**8th of 18**				PR	0-0-1	–		QR2	0-0-1	
1997–98	**Hellenic Football League**; **Premier Division**	8	34	17	7	20	69	42	27	58	**4th of 18**				QR1	1-0-1	–		R1	1-0-1	
1998–99	**Hellenic Football League**; **Premier Division**	8	36	20	9	7	73	33	40	69	**4th of 19**				QR3	2-1-1	–		QR2	0-0-1	
1999–2000	**Hellenic Football League**; **Premier Division**	8	36	29	5	2	87	22	65	92	**1st of 19**; Promoted				QR2	2-1-1	–		R2	2-0-1	Kevin Brock
2000–01	**Southern Football League**; **Eastern Division**	7	42	12	11	19	57	54	3	47	**13th of 22**				PR	0-0-1	R1	0-0-1	–		Kevin Brock
2001–02	**Southern Football League**; **Eastern Division**	7	42	13	9	20	53	66	-13	47 (Note: Banbury United were deducted one point.)	**15th of 22**			290	PR	1-0-0	R2	1-0-1	–		Kevin Brock
2002–03	**Southern Football League**; **Eastern Division**	7	42	21	11	10	75	50	25	74	**8th of 22**			410	QR1	1-1-1	R1	1-1-1	–		Kevin Brock
2003–04	**Southern Football League**; **Eastern Division**	7	42	19	10	13	65	57	8	67	**8th of 22**			290	PR	0-0-1	PR	0-0-1	–		Kevin Brock
Conference North, a new sixth tier league created, the club qualified to be transferred to the Premier Division
2004–05	**Southern Football League**; **Premier Division**	7	42	13	9	20	56	69	-13	48	**17th of 22**			388	QR1	0-0-1	R1	0-1-1	–		Kevin Brock
2005–06	**Southern Football League**; **Premier Division**	7	42	17	11	14	66	61	5	62	**7th of 22**			415	QR3	2-1-1	QR3	2-2-1	–		Kevin Brock
2006–07	**Southern Football League**; **Premier Division**	7	42	15	10	17	60	64	-4	55	**13th of 22**			376	QR2	1-1-1	QR3	2-1-1	–		Kevin Brock
2007–08	**Southern Football League**; **Premier Division**	7	42	14	16	12	55	57	-2	58	**9th of 22**	Nicholas Gordon	18	328	QR1	0-0-1	QR1	0-0-1	–		Kieran Sullivan
2008–09	**Southern Football League**; **Premier Division**	7	42	11	8	23	43	83	-40	41	**19th of 22**; Reprieved	Nicholas Gordon	14	297	QR1	0-0-1	QR1	0-0-1	–		Kieran Sullivan
2009–10	**Southern Football League**; **Premier Division**	7	42	14	13	15	53	67	-14	55	**12th of 22**	David Stone	17	312	QR1	0-1-1	QR2	1-2-1	–		Billy Jeffrey
2010–11	**Southern Football League**; **Premier Division**	7	40	11	8	21	44	67	-23	40 (Note: Banbury United were deducted one point for fielding an ineligible player.)	**16th of 21**	Nabil Shariff	6	274	QR1	0-0-1	QR2	1-1-1	–		Billy Jeffrey
2011–12	**Southern Football League**; **Premier Division**	7	42	13	10	19	54	61	-7	49	**16th of 22**	Ricky Johnson	12	273	QR1	0-0-1	QR3	2-1-1	–		Ady Fuller
2012–13	**Southern Football League**; **Premier Division**	7	42	14	9	19	60	75	-15	51	**16th of 22**	Albi Skendi	10	220	QR1	0-1-1	QR1	0-2-0	–		Ed Stein
2013–14	**Southern Football League**; **Premier Division**	7	44	14	5	25	64	116	-52	47	**19th of 23**	Kynan Isaac	12	242	QR1	0-0-1	QR1	0-0-1	–		Ed Stein
2014–15	**Southern Football League**; **Premier Division**	7	44	9	10	25	53	86	-33	37	**21st of 23**; Relegated	Leam Howards	12	247	QR2	1-0-1	QR3	2-1-1	–		Paul Davis
2015–16	**Southern Football League**; **Division One South & West**	8	42	28	10	4	97	38	+59	94	**2nd of 22**; Promoted	Ricky Johnson	26	327	PR	0-0-1	QR1	1-1-1	–		Mike Ford
2015–16	**Southern Football League**; **Division One South & West**	8	Promoted after winning the play-offs												PR	0-0-1	QR1	1-1-1	–		Mike Ford
2016–17	**Southern Football League**; **Premier Division**	7	46	24	8	14	67	40	+27	80	**6th of 24**	Conor McDonagh	14	388	QR3	2-0-1	QR1	0-0-1	–		Mike Ford
2017–18	**Southern Football League**; **Premier Division**	7	46	19	15	12	90	59	+31	72	**9th of 24**	Jefferson Louis	13	385	QR3	2-0-1	QR2	1-2-1	–		Mike Ford
The Premier Division of the Southern League divided into two sections
2018–19	**Southern Football League**; **Premier Division Central**	7	42	13	14	15	53	55	-2	49 (Note: Banbury United were deducted four points for infringement of league rules.)	**17th of 24**	Ravi Shamsi	15	405	QR2	1-1-1	QR2	1-0-1	–		Mike Ford
2019–20	**Southern Football League**; **Premier Division Central**	7	32	14	10	8	48	31	+17	52	7th of 22	Jaanai Gordon	13	442	QR1	0-1-1	QR1	0-0-1	–		Mike Ford
2019–20	**Southern Football League**; **Premier Division Central**	7	The season was declared null and void due to COVID-19												QR1	0-1-1	QR1	0-0-1	–		Mike Ford
2020–21	**Southern Football League**; **Premier Division Central**	7	7	2	2	3	9	13	-4	8	18th of 22	three players	2	– (Note: COVID-19 prevented fans from attending games.)	R1	3-1-1	QR3	0-0-1	–		Andy Whing
2020–21	**Southern Football League**; **Premier Division Central**	7	The season was declared null and void due to COVID-19												R1	3-1-1	QR3	0-0-1	–		Andy Whing
2021–22	**Southern Football League**; **Premier Division Central**	7	40	32	6	2	92	32	+60	102	**1st of 21**; Promoted	Chris Wreh	21	796	R1	4-0-1	R1	1-0-1	–		Andy Whing
2022–23	**National League North**	6	46	13	15	18	55	62	-7	54	**17th of 24**	Giorgio Rasulo; Jack Stevens	9	878	QR4	2-0-1	R5	3-0-1	–		Andy Whing
2023–24	**National League North**	6	46	10	8	28	38	86	-48	38	**22nd of 24**; Relegated	Ken Charles	12	617	QR2	0-0-1	R2	0-0-1	–		Mark Jones; Kevin Wilson
2024–25	**Southern Football League**; **Premier Division Central**	7	42	14	15	13	40	40	0	57	**12th of 22**	AJ George	5	579	QR2	1-1-1	QR3	0-0-1	–		Simon Hollyhead

== Notes ==
- Source: Banbury United at the Football Club History Database
