= Colin Holder =

English footballer (born 1944)

Personal information
- Full name: Colin Walter Holder
- Date of birth: 6 January 1944 (age 82)
- Place of birth: Cheltenham, England
- Position: Centre forward

Youth career
- 1959–1961: Coventry City

Senior career*
Years	Team	Apps	(Gls)
1961–1963	Coventry City	9	(4)
- → Lockheed Leamington (loan)
1963	Chelmsford City	7	(2)
1963–1964	Weymouth		
1964	→ Nuneaton Borough (loan)		
1964	→ Stourbridge (loan)		
1964	Deal Town		
1964–1966	Margate		
1966–1967	Cheltenham Town		
1967–1969	Banbury United		(26)
- Rugby Town
1970–1971	Gloucester City		
1971	Kidderminster Harriers		
1971–1973	Salisbury		(0)
1973–1974	Burton Albion		
1974–1975	Hednesford Town		
- Coleshill Town
- Armitage
1990	Banbury United	0	(0)

Managerial career
- 1981–1984: Coleshill Town
- Armitage
- 1989–1991: Banbury United
- 1991–1992: Willenhall Town
- * Club domestic league appearances and goals

Colin Walter Holder (born 6 January 1944) is an English former footballer who played as a centre forward.

== Club career ==
Following joining Coventry City as a junior, Holder made his senior debut for the club at the age of 17 on 20 March 1961 in a Division Three 3–3 draw away at Newport County. Holder made nine Football League appearances, scoring four times, during his time at the club. In 1963, following a loan move to Lockheed Leamington whilst at Coventry, Holder joined Chelmsford City. Holder failed to settle at Chelmsford, after scoring twice in seven appearances, and departed the club in December 1963 to join Weymouth. Holder once again failed to settle at Weymouth and was loaned out to Nuneaton Borough and Stourbridge. Following a brief sabbatical away from football in 1964, Holder joined Deal Town. After scoring 10 times in 27 games in all competitions for Deal, Holder signed for Margate in November 1964. During the course of two seasons at Margate, Holder made 86 appearances, scoring 25 times.

In 1966, following an offer to play in Australia, Holder signed for hometown club Cheltenham Town, for whom his father also played for in the Southern League. Holder played for the club 24 times, scoring four before departing for Banbury United. Following a spell at Banbury, Holder played for Rugby Town, Gloucester City, Kidderminster Harriers, Salisbury, Burton Albion and Hednesford Town.

== Managerial career ==
In 1981, Holder was appointed as Coleshill Town manager. During Holder's time at the club, Coleshill won the 1983 Walsall Senior Cup, before Holder left a year later. In December 1989, following a spell at Armitage, Holder returned to Banbury United as manager. Holder's tenure at the club lasted 13 months. In December 1991, Holder was appointed Willenhall Town manager, being sacked four months later.
