= 2025–26 Sunderland A.F.C. season =

English football club season

Sunderland
2025–26 season
- Chairman: Kyril Louis-Dreyfus
- Head coach: Régis Le Bris
- Stadium: Stadium of Light
- Premier League: 7th
- FA Cup: Fifth round
- EFL Cup: Second round
- Top goalscorer: League: Brian Brobbey (7); All: Brian Brobbey (7)
- Highest home attendance: 47,257 (v. Crystal Palace, Premier League, 17 January 2026)
- Lowest home attendance: 46,233 (v. West Ham United, Premier League, 16 August 2025)
- Average home league attendance: 46,842
- Biggest win: 3–0 v. West Ham United (H); Premier League, 16 August 2025; 3–0 v. Burnley (H); Premier League, 2 February 2026
- Biggest defeat: 0–5 v. Nottingham Forest (H); Premier League, 24 April 2026
Home colours	Away colours	Third colours

The 2025–26 season was the 147th season in the history of Sunderland Association Football Club, and the club's first season back in the Premier League since the 2016–17 campaign, following promotion from the Championship in the preceding season. In addition to the domestic league, the club also participated in the FA Cup and the EFL Cup.

Sunderland placed 7th in the Premier League, their domestic league performance granting them a place in the 2026–27 UEFA Europa League, their first qualification for European football since 1973.

== Squad ==
As of 8 September 2025

No.	Player	Position	Nationality	Date of birth (age)	Previous club	Contract end
Goalkeepers
1	Anthony Patterson	GK	(England)	10 May 2000 (age 26)	Academy	30 June 2028
21	Simon Moore	GK	(England)	19 May 1990 (age 36)	Coventry City	30 June 2026
22	Robin Roefs	GK	(Netherlands)	17 January 2003 (age 23)	NEC Nijmegen	30 June 2030
Defenders
3	Dennis Cirkin	LB	(England)	6 April 2002 (age 24)	Tottenham Hotspur	30 June 2026
5	Daniel Ballard	CB	(Northern Ireland)	22 September 1999 (age 27)	Arsenal	30 June 2028
6	Lutsharel Geertruida	RB	(Netherlands)	18 July 2000 (age 26)	RB Leipzig	30 June 2026 (loan)
13	Luke O'Nien	CB	(England)	21 November 1994 (age 31)	Wycombe Wanderers	30 June 2027
15	Omar Alderete	CB	(Paraguay)	26 December 1996 (age 29)	Getafe	30 June 2029
17	Reinildo Mandava	LB	(Mozambique)	21 January 1994 (age 32)	Atlético Madrid	30 June 2027
20	Nordi Mukiele	RB	(France)	1 November 1997 (age 29)	Paris Saint-Germain	30 June 2029
26	Arthur Masuaku	LB	(Democratic Republic of the Congo)	7 November 1993 (age 33)	Beşiktaş	30 June 2027
32	Trai Hume	RB	(Northern Ireland)	18 March 2002 (age 24)	Linfield	30 June 2030
33	Leo Hjelde	CB	(Norway)	26 August 2003 (age 23)	Leeds United	30 June 2028
41	Zak Johnson	CB	(England)	25 May 2005 (age 21)	Academy	30 June 2026
42	Aji Alese	CB	(England)	17 January 2001 (age 25)	West Ham United	30 June 2027
Midfielders
4	Dan Neil	CM	(England)	30 November 2001 (age 24)	Academy	30 June 2026
11	Chris Rigg	AM	(England)	18 June 2007 (age 19)	Academy	30 June 2030
19	Habib Diarra	CM	(Senegal)	3 January 2004 (age 22)	Strasbourg	30 June 2030
27	Noah Sadiki	DM	(Democratic Republic of the Congo)	15 January 2002 (age 24)	Union Saint-Gilloise	30 June 2030
28	Enzo Le Fée	CM	(France)	3 February 2000 (age 26)	Roma	30 June 2029
34	Granit Xhaka (c)	DM	(Switzerland)	27 September 1992 (age 34)	Bayer Leverkusen	30 June 2028
50	Harrison Jones	AM	(England)	25 December 2004 (age 21)	Academy	30 June 2026
Forwards
7	Chemsdine Talbi	RW	(Morocco)	9 May 2005 (age 21)	Club Brugge	30 June 2030
9	Brian Brobbey	ST	(Netherlands)	1 February 2002 (age 24)	Ajax	30 June 2030
12	Eliezer Mayenda	ST	(Spain)	8 May 2005 (age 21)	Sochaux	30 June 2030
14	Romaine Mundle	LW	(England)	24 April 2003 (age 23)	Standard Liège	30 June 2028
18	Wilson Isidor	ST	(Haiti)	27 August 2000 (age 26)	Zenit Saint Petersburg	30 June 2028
24	Simon Adingra	LW	(Ivory Coast)	1 January 2002 (age 24)	Brighton & Hove Albion	30 June 2030
25	Bertrand Traoré	RW	(Burkina Faso)	6 September 1995 (age 31)	Ajax	30 June 2026
29	Ahmed Abdullahi	ST	(Nigeria)	19 June 2004 (age 22)	Gent	30 June 2028
37	Jocelin Ta Bi	RW	(Ivory Coast)	9 February 2005 (age 21)	Maccabi Netanya	30 June 2030
Out on loan
2	Niall Huggins	RB	(Wales)	18 December 2000 (age 25)	Leeds United	30 June 2026
23	Jenson Seelt	CB	(Netherlands)	23 May 2003 (age 23)	PSV Eindhoven	30 June 2028
8	Alan Browne	CM	(Republic of Ireland)	15 April 1995 (age 31)	Preston North End	30 June 2027
30	Milan Aleksić	AM	(Serbia)	30 August 2005 (age 21)	Radnički 1923	30 June 2028
10	Patrick Roberts	RW	(England)	5 February 1997 (age 29)	Manchester City	30 June 2026
47	Trey Samuel-Ogunsuyi	ST	(Belgium)	26 December 2006 (age 19)	Academy	30 June 2028
Recalled from loan
9	Marc Guiu	ST	(Spain)	4 January 2006 (age 20)	Chelsea	30 June 2026 (loan)

== Transfers ==
=== In ===
Date	Pos.	Player	From	Fee	Ref.
1 July 2025 (Note: The transfer was announced on 3 June, and became official on 1 July.)	CM	(France) Enzo Le Fée	(Italy) Roma	£19,300,000	
1 July 2025	CM	(Senegal) Habib Diarra	(France) Strasbourg	£30,000,000	
2 July 2025	CM	(Northern Ireland) Matthew Burns	(Northern Ireland) Coleraine	Undisclosed	
4 July 2025	CM	(Democratic Republic of the Congo) Noah Sadiki	(Belgium) Union Saint-Gilloise	£17,500,000	
8 July 2025	LB	(Mozambique) Reinildo Mandava	(Spain) Atlético Madrid	Free	
9 July 2025	RW	(Morocco) Chemsdine Talbi	(Belgium) Club Brugge	£19,500,000	
10 July 2025	LW	(Ivory Coast) Simon Adingra	(England) Brighton & Hove Albion	£21,000,000	
19 July 2025	GK	(England) Isaac Allan	(England) Lincoln City	Free	
30 July 2025	CM	(Switzerland) Granit Xhaka	(Germany) Bayer Leverkusen	£17,300,000	
1 August 2025	GK	(Netherlands) Robin Roefs	(Netherlands) NEC Nijmegen	£11,500,000	
10 August 2025	LB	(Democratic Republic of the Congo) Arthur Masuaku	(Turkey) Beşiktaş	Free	
12 August 2025	CB	(Paraguay) Omar Alderete	(Spain) Getafe	£10,400,000	
17 August 2025	RB	(France) Nordi Mukiele	(France) Paris Saint-Germain	£12,000,000	
1 September 2025	ST	(Netherlands) Brian Brobbey	(Netherlands) Ajax	£21,300,000	
1 September 2025	RW	(Burkina Faso) Bertrand Traoré	(Netherlands) Ajax	£2,500,000	
16 January 2026	RW	(Ivory Coast) Jocelin Ta Bi	(Israel) Maccabi Netanya	£3,500,000	
1 February 2026	GK	(Sweden) Melker Ellborg	(Sweden) Malmö FF	£3,000,000	
2 February 2026	LW	(Ecuador) Nilson Angulo	(Belgium) Anderlecht	£15,000,000 (Note: Additional potential £2,500,000 in performance-related add-ons.)	

Expenditure: ▼£203,800,000

=== Out ===
Date	Pos.	Player	To	Fee	Ref.
1 June 2025 (Note: The transfer was announced on 1 April, and became official on 1 June.)	LW	(England) Tom Watson	(England) Brighton & Hove Albion	£11,000,000 (Note: Included a 20% sell-on clause)	
10 June 2025	CM	(England) Jobe Bellingham	(Germany) Borussia Dortmund	£32,000,000 (Note: Included a 15% sell-on clause.)	
1 July 2025	GK	(England) Nathan Bishop	(England) AFC Wimbledon	Undisclosed	
14 August 2025	DM	(France) Pierre Ekwah	(France) Saint-Étienne	£6,000,000	
22 August 2025	CB	(Australia) Nectarios Triantis	(United States) Minnesota United	£2,200,000	
9 January 2026	CM	(England) Jay Matete	(England) Milton Keynes Dons	Undisclosed	
13 January 2026	CM	(England) Ben Middlemas	(England) Swindon Town	Undisclosed	
15 January 2026	CB	(England) Joe Anderson	(England) Barrow	Undisclosed	
17 January 2026	GK	(Cameroon) Blondy Nna Noukeu	(France) Boulogne	Undisclosed	
2 February 2026	AM	(France) Adil Aouchiche	(Germany) Schalke 04	Undisclosed	
2 February 2026	RW	(England) Patrick Roberts	(England) Birmingham City	Undisclosed	
3 March 2026	AM	(Colombia) Ian Poveda	(Colombia) Internacional de Bogotá	Undisclosed	

Income ▲£51,200,000 (not inc. undisclosed transfers)

=== Loans in ===
Date	Pos.	Player	From	Date until	Ref.
6 August 2025	ST	(Spain) Marc Guiu	(England) Chelsea	1 September 2025 (Note: Initial loan was until 30 June 2026, however, on 1 September, Guiu was recalled to his parent club, Chelsea.)	
1 September 2025	RB	(Netherlands) Lutsharel Geertruida	(Germany) RB Leipzig	30 June 2026 (Note: Initial loan fee of £2,500,000 with an option for a permanent transfer for a further fee of £18,000,000.)	

=== Loans out ===
Date	Pos.	Player	To	Date until	Ref.
6 July 2025	AM	(France) Adil Aouchiche	(Scotland) Aberdeen	2 February 2026 (Note: On 2 February, Aouchiche was recalled from his initial season-long loan at Aberdeen and subsequently signed for Schalke 04.)	
24 July 2025	GK	(England) Matty Young	(England) Salford City	31 May 2026	
13 August 2025	RB	(England) Tom Lavery	(Northern Ireland) Cliftonville	6 January 2026 (Note: On 6 January, Lavery was recalled from his initial season-long loan at Cliftonville.)	
15 August 2025	LW	(Northern Ireland) Rhys Walsh	(England) South Shields	12 September 2025	
19 August 2025	GK	(England) Dan Cameron	(England) Hebburn Town	16 September 2025	
27 August 2025	ST	(Portugal) Luís Semedo	(Portugal) Moreirense	31 May 2026 (Note: Included an option to make the transfer permanent for an undisclosed fee.)	
30 August 2025	ST	(Belgium) Trey Samuel-Ogunsuyi	(Scotland) Falkirk	6 January 2026 (Note: On 6 January, Samuel-Ogunsuyi was recalled from his initial season-long loan at Falkirk.)	
1 September 2025	LB	(England) Oliver Bainbridge	(England) South Shields	31 May 2026 (Note: On 9 January, Bainbridge's loan at South Shields was extended until the end of the season.)	
1 September 2025	CM	(Republic of Ireland) Alan Browne	(England) Middlesbrough	31 May 2026	
1 September 2025	RB	(Wales) Niall Huggins	(England) Wycombe Wanderers	31 May 2026	
1 September 2025	RW	(England) Patrick Roberts	(England) Birmingham City	2 February 2026 (Note: On 2 February, Roberts joined Birmingham City permanently.)	
1 September 2025	CB	(Netherlands) Jenson Seelt	(Germany) VfL Wolfsburg	31 May 2026	
2 September 2025	ST	(Ukraine) Nazariy Rusyn	(Poland) Arka Gdynia	31 May 2026	
5 September 2025	CM	(Serbia) Milan Aleksić	(Poland) Cracovia	25 January 2026 (Note: On 25 January, Aleksić was recalled from his initial season-long loan at Cracovia.)	
28 November 2025	CB	(England) Zak Johnson	(England) York City	31 May 2026 (Note: On 9 January, Johnson's loan at York City was extended until the end of the season.)	
6 January 2026	RB	(France) Timothée Pembélé	(France) Le Havre	31 May 2026	
9 January 2026	ST	(Belgium) Trey Samuel-Ogunsuyi	(England) Shrewsbury Town	31 May 2026	
9 January 2026	ST	(England) Jake Waters	(England) Spennymoor Town	7 February 2026	
16 January 2026	LW	(Ukraine) Timur Tutierov	(England) Exeter City	31 May 2026	
23 January 2026	GK	(England) Isaac Allan	(England) Whitby Town	3 March 2026 (Note: On 3 March, Allan was recalled from his loan at Whitby Town and subsequently joined Hebburn Town on loan.)	
23 January 2026	RB	(England) Tom Lavery	(England) FC Halifax Town	31 May 2026	
23 January 2026	RW	(England) Ethan Moore	(England) Gateshead	31 May 2026	
27 January 2026	LB	(Democratic Republic of the Congo) Arthur Masuaku	(France) Lens	31 May 2026	
27 January 2026	CM	(England) Dan Neil	(England) Ipswich Town	31 May 2026	
29 January 2026	CB	(England) Aji Alese	(England) Portsmouth	31 May 2026	
1 February 2026	GK	(England) Anthony Patterson	(England) Millwall	31 May 2026	
2 February 2026	LW	(Ivory Coast) Simon Adingra	(France) Monaco	31 May 2026	
2 February 2026	CB	(Norway) Leo Hjelde	(England) Sheffield United	31 May 2026	
3 March 2026	GK	(England) Isaac Allan	(England) Hebburn Town	31 May 2026	
3 March 2026	GK	(England) Dan Cameron	(England) Boston United	31 May 2026	
3 March 2026	ST	(England) Jake Waters	(England) Hebburn Town	31 May 2026	

=== Released / Out of contract ===
Date	Pos.	Player	Subsequent club	Join date	Ref.
30 June 2025	GK	(England) Kelechi Chibueze	Retired		
30 June 2025	RW	(England) Aaron Chungh	(England) Morpeth Town	19 August 2025	
30 June 2025	CB	(England) Ben Crompton	(Scotland) Ross County	1 July 2025 (Note: The transfer was announced on 19 June, and became official on 1 July.)	
30 June 2025	AM	(England) Caden Kelly	(England) South Shields	1 July 2025 (Note: The transfer was announced on 23 June, and became official on 1 July.)	
30 June 2025	CM	(Bangladesh) Cuba Mitchell	(Bangladesh) Bashundhara Kings	28 July 2025 (Note: The transfer was announced on 28 July, and became official on 10 August.)	
30 June 2025	CB	(England) Daniel Parker			

=== New contracts ===
Date	Pos.	Player	Contract expiry	Ref.
First team
7 August 2025	ST	(Spain) Eliezer Mayenda	30 June 2030	
13 August 2025	RB	(Northern Ireland) Trai Hume	30 June 2030	
14 August 2025	CB	(England) Luke O'Nien	30 June 2027	
28 August 2025	AM	(England) Chris Rigg	30 June 2030	
1 March 2026	CB	(Northern Ireland) Daniel Ballard	30 June 2029 (Note: Club option of an additional year.)	
Academy
7 July 2025	CM	(England) Jaydon Jones	Undisclosed (Note: First professional contract.)	
7 July 2025	AM	(England) Jack Whittaker	Undisclosed	
8 July 2025	CB	(England) Ben Kindon	Undisclosed	
8 July 2025	GK	(Northern Ireland) Ben Metcalf	Undisclosed	
13 August 2025	ST	(Belgium) Trey Samuel-Ogunsuyi	30 June 2028	
21 May 2026	GK	(England) Matty Young	30 June 2030	

== Pre-season and friendlies ==
On 7 June, Sunderland announced their initial pre-season schedule, with matches against Gateshead, South Shields, Heart of Midlothian, Hull City and Real Betis. A training camp in Algarve was confirmed along with a friendlies against Sporting CP and Sevilla. The final two fixtures of Sunderland's pre-season schedule are against FC Augsburg and Rayo Vallecano.

Win Draw Loss Fixtures

12 July 2025 Friendly	Gateshead	2–2	Sunderland	Gateshead
12:30 BST		Report		Stadium: Gateshead International Stadium

12 July 2025 Friendly	South Shields	0–4	Sunderland	Jarrow
16:00 BST		Report	Isidor 1'; Mundle 41'; Aleksić 54'; Abdullahi 90+1'	Stadium: 1st Cloud Arena

19 July 2025 Friendly	Sevilla	1–1	Sunderland	Faro-Loulé, Portugal
20:00 WEST	Vargas 90+5'	Report	Le Fée 31'	Stadium: Estádio Algarve

21 July 2025 Friendly	Sporting CP	1–0	Sunderland	Faro-Loulé, Portugal
20:00 WEST	Trincão 11'			Stadium: Estádio Algarve

26 July 2025 Friendly	Heart of Midlothian	3–0	Sunderland	Edinburgh, Scotland
15:00 BST	Braga 11'; Shankland 60'; Kyziridis 83'	Report		Stadium: Tynecastle Park
Note: Testimonial match for Craig Gordon.

29 July 2025 Friendly	Hull City	2–1	Sunderland	Kingston upon Hull
19:45 BST	Tinsdale 17'; Kamara 71'	Report	Adingra 11'	Stadium: MKM Stadium

2 August 2025 Friendly	Sunderland	0–1	Real Betis	Sunderland
15:00 BST		Report	Ruibal 75'	Stadium: Stadium of Light

9 August 2025 Friendly	FC Augsburg	0–1	Sunderland	Augsburg, Germany
14:00 BST		Report	Diarra 14'	Stadium: Augsburg Arena

10 August 2025 Friendly	Sunderland	0–3	Rayo Vallecano	Sunderland
16:30 BST		Report	de Frutos; Espino; Palazón	Stadium: Stadium of Light

== Competitions ==
=== Overall record ===
Competition	First match	Last match	Starting round	Final position	Record							
Competition	First match	Last match	Starting round	Final position	Pld	W	D	L	GF	GA	GD	Win %
Premier League	16 August 2025	24 May 2026	Matchday 1	7th	38	14	12	12	42	48	−6	36.84
FA Cup	10 January 2026	8 March 2026	Third round	Fifth round	3	1	1	1	2	2	+0	33.33
EFL Cup	26 August 2025		Second round	Second round	1	0	1	0	1	1	+0	0.00
Total					42	15	14	13	45	51	−6	35.71

Source: Soccerway

=== Premier League ===
==== League table ====
Pos	Team	Pld	W	D	L	GF	GA	GD	Pts	Qualification or relegation
5	Liverpool	38	17	9	12	63	53	+10	60	Qualification for the Champions League league phase (Note: The Premier League gained an additional Champions League place as a result of England gaining one of the two European Performance Spots (EPS) awarded to the two associations with the highest UEFA coefficient points in 2025–26.)
6	Bournemouth	38	13	18	7	58	54	+4	57	Qualification for the Europa League league phase (Note: Since the winners of the 2025–26 FA Cup and 2025–26 EFL Cup, Manchester City, qualified for the Champions League by league position, the spot reserved for the FA Cup winners (Europa League league phase) was passed to the seventh-placed team, and the spot reserved for the EFL Cup winners (Conference League play-off round) was passed to the eighth-placed team.)
7	Sunderland	38	14	12	12	42	48	−6	54	Qualification for the Europa League league phase
8	Brighton & Hove Albion	38	14	11	13	52	46	+6	53	Qualification for the Conference League play-off round
9	Brentford	38	14	11	13	55	52	+3	53	

Source: Premier League
Rules for classification: 1) Points; 2) Goal difference; 3) Goals scored; 4) If the champions, relegated teams or qualified teams for UEFA competitions cannot be determined by rules 1 to 3, rules 4.1 to 4.3 are applied – 4.1) Points gained in head-to-head record between such teams; 4.2) Away goals scored in head-to-head record between such teams; 4.3) Play-offs

==== Results summary ====
Overall								Home						Away					
Pld	W	D	L	GF	GA	GD	Pts	W	D	L	GF	GA	GD	W	D	L	GF	GA	GD
38	14	12	12	42	48	−6	54	9	6	4	25	20	+5	5	6	8	17	28	−11

Source: Soccerway

==== Results by round ====
Round	1	2	3	4	5	6	7	8	9	10	11	12	13	14	15	16	17	18	19	20	21	22	23	24	25	26	27	28	29	30	31	32	33	34	35	36	37	38
Ground	H	A	H	A	H	A	A	H	A	H	H	A	H	A	A	H	A	H	H	A	A	H	A	H	A	H	H	A	A	H	A	H	A	H	A	H	A	H
Result	W	L	W	D	D	W	L	W	W	D	D	L	W	D	L	W	D	D	D	D	L	W	L	W	L	L	L	D	W	L	W	W	L	L	D	D	W	W
Position	2	7	6	7	7	5	9	7	4	4	4	7	6	6	9	8	6	7	7	8	10	9	11	8	9	11	12	12	11	13	11	10	11	12	12	12	10	7
Points	3	3	6	7	8	11	11	14	17	18	19	19	22	23	23	26	27	28	29	30	30	33	33	36	36	36	36	37	40	40	43	46	46	46	47	48	51	54

Source: Premier League
A = Away; H = Home; W = Win; D = Draw; L = Loss; P = Postponed

==== Matches ====
The league fixtures were released on 18 June 2025.

Win Draw Loss Fixtures

16 August 2025 1	Sunderland	3–0	West Ham United	Sunderland
15:00 BST	Mayenda 61'; Ballard 73'; Isidor 90+2'	Report	Kilman (yellow card) 70'	Stadium: Stadium of Light; Attendance: 46,233; Referee: Robert Jones

23 August 2025 2	Burnley	2–0	Sunderland	Burnley
15:00 BST	Cullen 47'; Anthony 88'	Report	Adingra (yellow card) 19'	Stadium: Turf Moor; Attendance: 21,285; Referee: Michael Salisbury

30 August 2025 3	Sunderland	2–1	Brentford	Sunderland
15:00 BST	Mandava (yellow card) 57'; Diarra (yellow card) 58'; Le Fée 82' (pen.); Xhaka (yellow card) 90+4'; Isidor 90+6'	Report	Schade (penalty missed) 59'; Thiago (yellow card) 61', (goal) 77'; Henry (yellow card) 80'	Stadium: Stadium of Light; Attendance: 46,267; Referee: Anthony Taylor

13 September 2025 4	Crystal Palace	0–0	Sunderland	Selhurst
15:00 BST	Muñoz (yellow card) 14'	Report	Roefs (yellow card) 77'	Stadium: Selhurst Park; Attendance: 25,154; Referee: Thomas Bramall

21 September 2025 5	Sunderland	1–1	Aston Villa	Sunderland
14:00 BST	Mandava (red card) 33'; Sadiki (yellow card) 74'; Isidor 75'; Xhaka (yellow card) 88'	Report	Maatsen (yellow card) 63'; Cash 67'	Stadium: Stadium of Light; Attendance: 46,261; Referee: Sam Barrott
Note: Fixture was initially scheduled for 20 September, but was moved for live Sky Sports broadcast.

27 September 2025 6	Nottingham Forest	0–1	Sunderland	West Bridgford
17:30 BST	Domínguez (yellow card) 36'; Milenković (yellow card) 38'; Williams (yellow card) 49'; Anderson (yellow card) 83'	Report	Sadiki (yellow card) 9'; Masuaku (yellow card) 31'; Alderete 38'	Stadium: City Ground; Attendance: 30,226; Referee: Tony Harrington
Note: Fixture was initially scheduled for a 15:00 kick-off, but was moved for live Sky Sports broadcast.

4 October 2025 7	Manchester United	2–0	Sunderland	Trafford
15:00 BST	Mount 8'; Šeško 31'; Casemiro (yellow card) 81'	Report	Alderete (yellow card) 29'; Sadiki (yellow card) 35'; Traoré (yellow card) 57'; Xhaka (yellow card) 76'	Stadium: Old Trafford; Attendance: 74,004; Referee: Stuart Attwell

18 October 2025 8	Sunderland	2–0	Wolverhampton Wanderers	Sunderland
15:00 BST	Mukiele 16'; Krejčí 90+2' (o.g.)	Report		Stadium: Stadium of Light; Attendance: 46,578; Referee: Robert Jones

25 October 2025 9	Chelsea	1–2	Sunderland	Fulham
15:00 BST	Garnacho 4'; Santos (yellow card) 88'	Report	Isidor 22'; Le Fée (yellow card) 69'; Talbi 90+3'	Stadium: Stamford Bridge; Attendance: 39,489; Referee: Andrew Madley

3 November 2025 10	Sunderland	1–1	Everton	Sunderland
20:00 GMT	Sadiki (yellow card) 17'; Mukiele (yellow card) 18'; Xhaka 46'; Hume (yellow card) 54'	Report	Ndiaye 15'; Barry (yellow card) 32'; Alcaraz (yellow card) 90+5'	Stadium: Stadium of Light; Attendance: 46,476; Referee: Thomas Bramall
Note: Fixture was initially scheduled for 1 November, but was moved for live Sky Sports broadcast.

8 November 2025 11	Sunderland	2–2	Arsenal	Sunderland
17:30 GMT	Ballard 36'; Xhaka (yellow card) 45+1'; Mandava (yellow card) 72'; Brobbey 90+4'	Report	Zubimendi (yellow card) 36'; Saka 54'; Trossard 74'	Stadium: Stadium of Light; Attendance: 46,799; Referee: Craig Pawson
Note: Fixture was initially scheduled for a 15:00 kick-off, but was moved for live Sky Sports broadcast.

22 November 2025 12	Fulham	1–0	Sunderland	Fulham
15:00 GMT	Jiménez 84', (yellow card) 90+5'; Leno (yellow card) 90+3'; Wilson (yellow card) 90+4'	Report	Ballard (yellow card) 32'; Mandava (yellow card) 79'; Hume (yellow card) 88'	Stadium: Craven Cottage; Attendance: 27,560; Referee: Darren England

29 November 2025 13	Sunderland	3–2	Bournemouth	Sunderland
15:00 GMT	Alderete (yellow card) 21'; Le Fée 30' (pen.); Traoré 46'; Hume (yellow card) 65'; Brobbey 69'; Roefs (yellow card) 90'; Mukiele (yellow card) 90+3'; Mundle (yellow card) 90+8'	Report	Adli 7'; Adams 15'; Scott (yellow card) 25'; Semenyo (yellow card) 86'; Senesi (yellow card) 90+1'; Brooks (yellow card) 90+3'; Cook (red card) 90+6'; Tavernier (yellow card) 90+12'	Stadium: Stadium of Light; Attendance: 46,973; Referee: Tim Robinson

3 December 2025 14	Liverpool	1–1	Sunderland	Liverpool
20:15 GMT	Gomez (yellow card) 55'; Mukiele 81' (o.g.)	Report	Le Fée (yellow card) 54'; Talbi 67'	Stadium: Anfield; Attendance: 60,414; Referee: Stuart Attwell
Note: Fixture was initially scheduled for a 20:00 kick-off, but was moved for live Sky Sports broadcast.

6 December 2025 15	Manchester City	3–0	Sunderland	Manchester
15:00 GMT	Dias 31'; Gvardiol 35', (yellow card) 37'; Foden 65'	Report	O'Nien (red card) 90+5'	Stadium: City of Manchester Stadium; Attendance: 52,436; Referee: Andrew Madley

14 December 2025 16	Sunderland	1–0	Newcastle United	Sunderland
14:00 GMT	Brobbey (yellow card) 27'; Mukiele (yellow card) 34'; Woltemade 46' (o.g.); Mandava (yellow card) 58'; Le Fée (yellow card) 86'; Isidor (yellow card) 90+4'	Report	Tonali (yellow card) 57'; Bruno Guimarães (yellow card) 90+4'; Willock (yellow card) 90+4'; Thiaw (yellow card) 90+5'	Stadium: Stadium of Light; Attendance: 47,158; Referee: Peter Bankes
Note: Fixture was initially scheduled for 13 December, but was moved for live Sky Sports broadcast.

20 December 2025 17	Brighton & Hove Albion	0–0	Sunderland	Brighton and Hove
15:00 GMT	Gruda (yellow card) 19'; Coppola (yellow card) 34'	Report	Ballard (yellow card) 79'; Le Fée (yellow card) 86'	Stadium: Falmer Stadium; Attendance: 31,426; Referee: Darren England

28 December 2025 18	Sunderland	1–1	Leeds United	Sunderland
14:00 GMT	Adingra 28'; Hume (yellow card) 61'	Report	Calvert-Lewin 47'	Stadium: Stadium of Light; Attendance: 46,675; Referee: Tony Harrington
Note: Fixture was initially scheduled for 27 December, but was moved for live Sky Sports broadcast.

1 January 2026 19	Sunderland	0–0	Manchester City	Sunderland
20:00 GMT	Adingra (yellow card) 45+5'	Report	Aké (yellow card) 77'	Stadium: Stadium of Light; Attendance: 46,920; Referee: Jarred Gillett
Note: Fixture was initially scheduled for 30 December, but was moved for live Sky Sports broadcast.

4 January 2026 20	Tottenham Hotspur	1–1	Sunderland	Tottenham
15:00 GMT	Davies 30'; Bentancur (yellow card) 83'; Palhinha (yellow card) 90+6'	Report	Cirkin (yellow card) 47'; Alderete (yellow card) 50'; Le Fée (yellow card) 60'; Brobbey 80'	Stadium: Tottenham Hotspur Stadium; Attendance: 60,877; Referee: Stuart Attwell
Note: Fixture was initially scheduled for 3 January, but was moved for live Sky Sports broadcast.

7 January 2026 21	Brentford	3–0	Sunderland	Brentford
19:30 GMT	Thiago 30', 65', (yellow card) 43'; Janelt (yellow card) 63'; Yarmoliuk 73'	Report	Hume (yellow card) 45'; Le Fée (penalty missed) 60'	Stadium: Brentford Community Stadium; Attendance: 17,016; Referee: Matt Donohue
Note: Fixture was initially scheduled for a 20:00 kick-off, but was moved for live Sky Sports broadcast.

17 January 2026 22	Sunderland	2–1	Crystal Palace	Sunderland
15:00 GMT	Le Fée 33'; Hume (yellow card) 48'; Mukiele (yellow card) 63'; Alderete (yellow card) 66'; Brobbey 71'	Report	Richards (yellow card) 17'; Pino 30'; Wharton (yellow card) 36'; Mitchell (yellow card) 63'	Stadium: Stadium of Light; Attendance: 47,257; Referee: Robert Jones

24 January 2026 23	West Ham United	3–1	Sunderland	Stratford
12:30 GMT	Summerville 14'; Bowen 28' (pen.); Fernandes 43', (yellow card) 90+1'; Castellanos (yellow card) 71'	Report	Ballard (yellow card) 30'; Mandava (yellow card) 35'; Brobbey 66'; Sadiki (yellow card) 80'; Diarra (yellow card) 88'; Isidor (yellow card) 90+4'	Stadium: London Stadium; Attendance: 62,456; Referee: Thomas Bramall
Note: Fixture was initially scheduled for a 15:00 kick-off, but was moved for live TNT Sports broadcast.

2 February 2026 24	Sunderland	3–0	Burnley	Sunderland
20:00 GMT	Tuanzebe 9' (o.g.); Diarra 32'; Hume (yellow card) 67'; Talbi 72'	Report	Ugochukwu (yellow card) 45'; Dúbravka (yellow card) 67'; Anthony (yellow card) 70'; Walker (yellow card) 90+1'	Stadium: Stadium of Light; Attendance: 46,370; Referee: Paul Tierney
Note: Fixture was initially scheduled for 31 January, but was moved for live Sky Sports broadcast.

7 February 2026 25	Arsenal	3–0	Sunderland	Holloway
15:00 GMT	Saliba (yellow card) 26'; Zubimendi 42'; Gyökeres 66', 90+3'	Report	Diarra (yellow card) 39'; Brobbey (yellow card) 40'	Stadium: Emirates Stadium; Attendance: 60,312; Referee: Sam Barrott

11 February 2026 26	Sunderland	0–1	Liverpool	Sunderland
20:15 GMT	Mandava (yellow card) 24'	Report	Van Dijk 61'	Stadium: Stadium of Light; Attendance: 47,159; Referee: Chris Kavanagh
Note: Fixture was initially scheduled for a 19:45 kick-off, but was moved for live TNT Sports broadcast.

22 February 2026 27	Sunderland	1–3	Fulham	Sunderland
14:00 GMT	Brobbey (yellow card) 60'; Le Fée 76' (pen.)	Report	Jiménez (yellow card) 41', (goal) 54', 61' (pen.); Iwobi 85'	Stadium: Stadium of Light; Attendance: 47,222; Referee: Craig Pawson
Note: Fixture was initially scheduled for 21 February, but was moved for live Sky Sports broadcast.

28 February 2026 28	Bournemouth	1–1	Sunderland	Bournemouth
12:30 GMT	Adams (yellow card) 58'; Evanilson 63'; Tóth (yellow card) 86'; Christie (yellow card) 90'; Scott (yellow card) 90+5'	Report	Mayenda 18'; Sadiki (yellow card) 33'; Roefs (yellow card) 74'	Stadium: Dean Court; Attendance: 11,240; Referee: Jarred Gillett
Note: Fixture was initially scheduled for a 15:00 kick-off, but was moved for live TNT Sports broadcast.

3 March 2026 29	Leeds United	0–1	Sunderland	Leeds
19:30 GMT	Gnonto (yellow card) 90'	Report	O'Nien (yellow card) 45+2'; Diarra (yellow card) 58', (goal) 70' (pen.); Alderete (yellow card) 63'	Stadium: Elland Road; Attendance: 36,713; Referee: Stuart Attwell
Note: Fixture was originally scheduled for 4 March, but was rescheduled for live TNT Sports broadcasting.

14 March 2026 30	Sunderland	0–1	Brighton & Hove Albion	Sunderland
15:00 GMT	Xhaka (yellow card) 76'	Report	Gómez (yellow card) 51'; Minteh 58', (yellow card) 74'	Stadium: Stadium of Light; Attendance: 47,197; Referee: Thomas Kirk

22 March 2026 31	Newcastle United	1–2	Sunderland	Newcastle upon Tyne
12:00 GMT	Gordon 10'; Joelinton (yellow card) 90+1'	Report	Hume (yellow card) 44'; Talbi 57'; Alderte (yellow card) 82'; Brobbey 90', (yellow card) 90+1'; Sadiki (yellow card) 90+4'; Geertruida (yellow card) 90+4'; Mandava (yellow card) 90+9'	Stadium: St James' Park; Attendance: 52,253; Referee: Anthony Taylor
Note: Fixture was originally scheduled for 21 March, but was rescheduled for live Sky Sports broadcasting.

12 April 2026 32	Sunderland	1–0	Tottenham Hotspur	Sunderland
14:00 BST	Brobbey (yellow card) 33'; Mukiele 61'; Rigg (yellow card) 75'; Hume (yellow card) 90+1'	Report	Romero (yellow card) 28'; Van de Ven (yellow card) 37'; Porro (yellow card) 37'	Stadium: Stadium of Light; Attendance: 47,010; Referee: Robert Jones
Note: Fixture was originally scheduled for 11 April, but was rescheduled for live Sky Sports broadcasting.

19 April 2026 33	Aston Villa	4–3	Sunderland	Birmingham
14:00 BST	Watkins 2', 36'; Rogers 46'; Abraham 90+3'; Onana (yellow card) 90+8'	Report	Rigg 9'; Sadiki (yellow card) 66'; Hume 86'; Isidor 87'; Mukiele (yellow card) 90+5'; Ballard (yellow card) 90+8'	Stadium: Villa Park; Attendance: 42,599; Referee: Sam Barrott
Note: Fixture was initially scheduled for 18 April, but was pushed back a day due to Villa's UEFA Europa League involvements on the preceding Thursday.

24 April 2026 34	Sunderland	0–5	Nottingham Forest	Sunderland
20:00 BST	Diarra (yellow card) 51'; Xhaka (yellow card) 75'	Report	Hume 17' (o.g.); Wood 31'; Gibbs-White 34'; Igor Jesus 37', (yellow card) 60'; Domínguez (yellow card) 51'; Anderson (yellow card) 58', (goal) 90+5'; Williams (yellow card) 69'; Yates (yellow card) 76'	Stadium: Stadium of Light; Attendance: 47,047; Referee: Darren England
Note: Fixture was originally scheduled for 25 April, but was rescheduled for live Sky Sports broadcasting.

2 May 2026 35	Wolverhampton Wanderers	1–1	Sunderland	Wolverhampton
15:00 BST	S. Bueno 54'	Report	Mukiele 17'; Ballard (red card) 24'; Brobbey (yellow card) 45+2'; Xhaka (yellow card) 56'; Cirkin (yellow card) 81'; Roefs (yellow card) 90+2'	Stadium: Molineux Stadium; Attendance: 29,632; Referee: Paul Tierney

9 May 2026 36	Sunderland	0–0	Manchester United	Sunderland
15:00 BST		Report	Mount (yellow card) 54'; Zirkzee (yellow card) 58'; Cunha (yellow card) 90+3'	Stadium: Stadium of Light; Attendance: 47,233; Referee: Stuart Attwell

17 May 2026 37	Everton	1–3	Sunderland	Liverpool
15:00 BST	Iroegbunam (yellow card) 25'; Röhl 43'; O'Brien (yellow card) 47'; Garner (yellow card) 90+6'	Report	Brobbey 59'; Le Fée 81'; Isidor 90+1'	Stadium: Hill Dickinson Stadium; Attendance: 52,590; Referee: John Brooks

24 May 2026 38	Sunderland	2–1	Chelsea	Sunderland
16:00 BST	Hume 25'; Angulo (yellow card) 42'; Gusto 50' (o.g.); Geertruida (yellow card) 51'; Xhaka (yellow card) 73'; Diarra (yellow card) 81'; Sadiki (yellow card) 89'	Report	Fofana (yellow card) 54' (yellow-red card) 62'; Palmer 56', (yellow card) 90+11'; Fernández (yellow card) 69'; João Pedro (yellow card) 90+7'	Stadium: Stadium of Light; Attendance: 47,155; Referee: Chris Kavanagh

=== FA Cup ===
As a Premier League side, Sunderland entered the FA Cup in the third round, and were drawn away to Premier League club Everton. They were then drawn away to Oxford United in the fourth round, and away to Port Vale in the fifth round.

Win Draw Loss Fixtures

10 January 2026 Third round	Everton	1–1 (a.e.t.) (0–3 p)	Sunderland	Liverpool
12:15 GMT	Garner 89' (pen.); Barry (yellow card) 90+2'	Report	Le Fée 30'; Sadiki (yellow card) 45+1'; Xhaka (yellow card) 88'; Ballard (yellow card) 90+1'; Mukiele (yellow card) 109'; Hume (yellow card) 115'	Stadium: Hill Dickinson Stadium; Attendance: 51,588; Referee: John Brooks
	Penalties
	Garner (penalty missed); Barry (penalty missed); Beto (penalty missed)		(penalty scored) Le Fée; (penalty scored) Xhaka; (penalty scored) O'Nien

15 February 2026 Fourth round	Oxford United	0–1	Sunderland	Oxford
14:00 GMT	Vaulks (yellow card) 40'; Brannagan (yellow card) 61'	Report	Diarra 32' (pen.); Le Fée (yellow card) 33'; Hume (yellow card) 36'; Isidor (yellow card) 50'; O'Nien (yellow card) 68'; Sadiki (yellow card) 90+3'	Stadium: Kassam Stadium; Attendance: 9,879; Referee: Thomas Kirk

8 March 2026 Fifth round	Port Vale	1–0	Sunderland	Stoke-on-Trent
13:30 GMT	Waine 28', (yellow card) 54'; Brown (yellow card) 30'	Report	Ellborg (yellow card) 61'	Stadium: Vale Park; Attendance: 10,685; Referee: Anthony Taylor

=== EFL Cup ===
As one of the Premier League clubs not participating in European competitions, Sunderland entered the EFL Cup in the second round, and were drawn at home to League One side Huddersfield Town.

Win Draw Loss Fixtures

26 August 2025 Second round	Sunderland	1–1 (5–6 p)	Huddersfield Town	Sunderland
19:45 BST	Masuaku (yellow card) 38'; Guiu 84'; Neil (yellow card) 90+4'	Report	Castledine 9'; Charles (yellow card) 38'	Stadium: Stadium of Light; Attendance: 22,249; Referee: Dean Whitestone
	Penalties
	Le Fée (penalty scored); Roberts (penalty scored); Neil (penalty scored); Rigg (penalty scored); Seelt (penalty scored); Aleksić (penalty missed)		(penalty scored) Kane; (penalty scored) Radulović; (penalty scored) Harness; (penalty scored) Wiles; (penalty scored) Gooch; (penalty scored) Kasumu

== Statistics ==
=== Appearances and goals ===
Players with no appearances are not included on the list, italics indicate a loaned in player

No.	Pos	Nat	Player	Total		Premier League		FA Cup		EFL Cup	
No.	Pos	Nat	Player	Apps	Goals	Apps	Goals	Apps	Goals	Apps	Goals
3	DF	(England) ENG	Dennis Cirkin	10	0	3+5	0	2+0	0	0+0	0
5	DF	(Northern Ireland) NIR	Daniel Ballard	31	2	24+5	2	1+1	0	0+0	0
6	DF	(Netherlands) NED	Lutsharel Geertruida	30	0	17+11	0	2+0	0	0+0	0
7	FW	(Morocco) MAR	Chemsdine Talbi	30	4	16+12	4	2+0	0	0+0	0
9	FW	(Netherlands) NED	Brian Brobbey	32	7	22+9	7	0+1	0	0+0	0
10	FW	(Ecuador) ECU	Nilson Angulo	9	0	5+3	0	1+0	0	0+0	0
11	MF	(England) ENG	Chris Rigg	20	1	11+7	1	1+0	0	1+0	0
12	FW	(Spain) ESP	Eliezer Mayenda	23	2	8+12	2	2+1	0	0+0	0
13	DF	(England) ENG	Luke O'Nien	15	0	5+7	0	3+0	0	0+0	0
14	FW	(England) ENG	Romaine Mundle	16	0	2+12	0	2+0	0	0+0	0
15	DF	(Paraguay) PAR	Omar Alderete	34	1	32+1	1	1+0	0	0+0	0
17	DF	(Mozambique) MOZ	Reinildo Mandava	25	0	23+2	0	0+0	0	0+0	0
18	FW	(Haiti) HAI	Wilson Isidor	36	6	11+21	6	1+2	0	1+0	0
19	MF	(Senegal) SEN	Habib Diarra	22	3	15+5	2	2+0	1	0+0	0
20	DF	(France) FRA	Nordi Mukiele	35	3	32+0	3	2+0	0	1+0	0
22	GK	(Netherlands) NED	Robin Roefs	37	0	35+0	0	2+0	0	0+0	0
25	FW	(Burkina Faso) BFA	Bertrand Traoré	12	1	9+3	1	0+0	0	0+0	0
27	MF	(Democratic Republic of the Congo) COD	Noah Sadiki	35	0	33+0	0	1+1	0	0+0	0
28	MF	(France) FRA	Enzo Le Fée	40	6	33+3	5	3+0	1	1+0	0
30	MF	(Serbia) SRB	Milan Aleksić	1	0	0+0	0	0+0	0	0+1	0
31	GK	(Sweden) SWE	Melker Ellborg	4	0	3+0	0	1+0	0	0+0	0
32	DF	(Northern Ireland) NIR	Trai Hume	40	2	34+4	2	2+0	0	0+0	0
34	MF	(Switzerland) SUI	Granit Xhaka	36	1	32+2	1	1+1	0	0+0	0
37	FW	(Ivory Coast) CIV	Jocelin Ta Bi	2	0	1+0	0	0+1	0	0+0	0
50	MF	(England) ENG	Harrison Jones	1	0	0+0	0	0+0	0	1+0	0
51	DF	(England) ENG	Jenson Jones	1	0	0+0	0	0+0	0	0+1	0
Player(s) who featured but departed the club on loan during the season:
1	GK	(England) ENG	Anthony Patterson	1	0	0+0	0	0+0	0	1+0	0
2	DF	(Wales) WAL	Niall Huggins	1	0	0+0	0	0+0	0	1+0	0
4	MF	(England) ENG	Dan Neil	4	0	0+3	0	0+0	0	1+0	0
23	DF	(Netherlands) NED	Jenson Seelt	3	0	1+1	0	0+0	0	0+1	0
24	FW	(Ivory Coast) CIV	Simon Adingra	15	1	9+5	1	1+0	0	0+0	0
26	DF	(Democratic Republic of the Congo) COD	Arthur Masuaku	4	0	2+1	0	0+0	0	1+0	0
Player(s) who featured whilst on loan but returned to parent club during the season:
9	FW	(Spain) ESP	Marc Guiu	3	1	0+2	0	0+0	0	1+0	1
Player(s) who featured but departed the club permanently during the season:
10	FW	(England) ENG	Patrick Roberts	2	0	0+1	0	0+0	0	1+0	0

=== Disciplinary record ===
Includes all competitive matches. The list is sorted by squad number when disciplinary points / points per card / number of cards are equal. Players with no cards not included in the list.

Rank	No.	Pos.	Nat.	Player	Premier League			FA Cup			EFL Cup			Total		
Rank	No.	Pos.	Nat.	Player	Yellow card	Second yellow card	Red card	Yellow card	Second yellow card	Red card	Yellow card	Second yellow card	Red card	Yellow card	Second yellow card	Red card
1	27	MF	(Democratic Republic of the Congo)	Noah Sadiki	9	0	0	2	0	0	0	0	0	11	0	0
1	32	DF	(Northern Ireland)	Trai Hume	9	0	0	2	0	0	0	0	0	11	0	0
3	17	DF	(Mozambique)	Reinildo Mandava	7	0	1	0	0	0	0	0	0	7	0	1
4	34	MF	(Switzerland)	Granit Xhaka	8	0	0	1	0	0	0	0	0	9	0	0
5	5	DF	(Northern Ireland)	Daniel Ballard	4	0	1	1	0	0	0	0	0	5	0	1
6	9	FW	(Netherlands)	Brian Brobbey	6	0	0	0	0	0	0	0	0	6	0	0
6	15	DF	(Paraguay)	Omar Alderete	6	0	0	0	0	0	0	0	0	6	0	0
6	19	MF	(Senegal)	Habib Diarra	6	0	0	0	0	0	0	0	0	6	0	0
6	20	DF	(France)	Nordi Mukiele	5	0	0	1	0	0	0	0	0	6	0	0
6	28	MF	(France)	Enzo Le Fée	5	0	0	1	0	0	0	0	0	6	0	0
11	13	DF	(England)	Luke O'Nien	1	0	1	1	0	0	0	0	0	2	0	1
12	22	GK	(Netherlands)	Robin Roefs	4	0	0	0	0	0	0	0	0	4	0	0
13	18	FW	(Haiti)	Wilson Isidor	2	0	0	1	0	0	0	0	0	3	0	0
14	3	DF	(England)	Dennis Cirkin	2	0	0	0	0	0	0	0	0	2	0	0
14	6	DF	(Netherlands)	Lutsharel Geertruida	2	0	0	0	0	0	0	0	0	2	0	0
14	24	FW	(Ivory Coast)	Simon Adingra	2	0	0	0	0	0	0	0	0	2	0	0
14	26	DF	(Democratic Republic of the Congo)	Arthur Masuaku	1	0	0	0	0	0	1	0	0	2	0	0
18	4	DF	(England)	Dan Neil	0	0	0	0	0	0	1	0	0	1	0	0
18	10	FW	(Ecuador)	Nilson Angulo	1	0	0	0	0	0	0	0	0	1	0	0
18	11	MF	(England)	Chris Rigg	1	0	0	0	0	0	0	0	0	1	0	0
18	14	FW	(England)	Romaine Mundle	1	0	0	0	0	0	0	0	0	1	0	0
18	25	FW	(Burkina Faso)	Bertrand Traoré	1	0	0	0	0	0	0	0	0	1	0	0
18	31	GK	(Sweden)	Melker Ellborg	0	0	0	1	0	0	0	0	0	1	0	0
Total					83	0	3	11	0	0	2	0	0	96	0	3
