= Sunderland A.F.C. Under-21s and Academy =

Coordinates: 54°56′36″N 1°23′36″W

Sunderland Academy
- Full name: Sunderland Association Football Club
- Nickname: Black Cats
- Ground: Eppleton Colliery Welfare Ground; Stadium of Light (selected games)
- Owner(s): Kyril Louis-Dreyfus (64%); Juan Sartori (36%)
- Chairman: Kyril Louis-Dreyfus
- Manager: Robin Nicholls (Academy Manager); Graeme Murty (U21 Lead Coach); John Hewitson (U18 Lead Coach)
Home colours	Away colours	Third colours

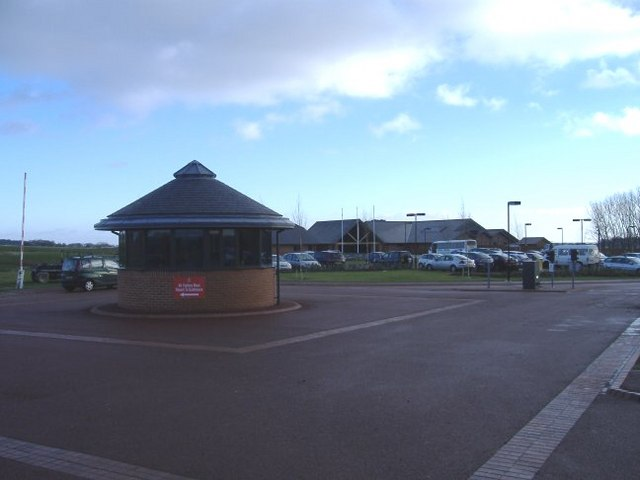
Entrance to the Academy of Light

Sunderland A.F.C. Academy is the collective name for the youth development squads of Sunderland Association Football Club, primarily the U18 and U21 teams. Sunderland have an 'Elite' Category 1 football academy based on the Elite Player Performance Plan and their teams are members of the Professional Development League.

Sunderland's academy is based at the Academy of Light in Cleadon, South Tyneside. Sunderland academy teams play at the Eppleton Colliery Welfare Ground, in Hetton-le-Hole (U21s) or at the Academy of Light (U18s). At least three U21 games per season are played at Stadium of Light as per the rules of the Professional Development League.

Numerous notable professional players have graduated from Sunderland's youth system over the years. In recent seasons, Jordan Henderson and Jordan Pickford have both represented England at senior international level. and Lynden Gooch has been capped for the United States.

== History ==
While second-string teams date back to the earliest years of the club, as the senior team gained entry to the Football League, they began to submit a reserve team in competitive competitions under the name Sunderland 'A'. The A team enlisted in both the Durham Challenge Cup and the Northern Football Alliance in 1890.

=== Leagues ===
The 'A' team won the inaugural Alliance in 1891 and dominated the early years of the league, winning five out of the first six seasons. They competed in the Alliance until 1902. In 1906 they joined the new North Eastern League along with reserve teams from Newcastle United, Middlesbrough and Bradford City. Sunderland finished second to Newcastle United 'A' in their first two seasons, and won the league for the first time in 1925. Sunderland went on to win it a further nine times, second only to Middlesbrough. The North East's league teams withdrew their reserve teams from the North Eastern League in 1958. Sunderland and Middlesbrough both joined the North Regional League. Sunderland won it once and came second three times before the league disbanded in 1969. Sunderland bid to join The Central League in 1970, but were unsuccessful after only receiving four votes.

Sunderland Reserves played a single season in the Wearside Football League in 1979–80, before joining The Central League in 1983.

Sunderland won the Central League once, in the 1998–99 season under the management of Adrian Heath. It was their final season in a competition that was then called the Pontins League Championship. In that season, a crowd of 33,513 at the Stadium of Light watched Sunderland Reserves beat Liverpool 1-0 - an all-time record attendance for the Central League.

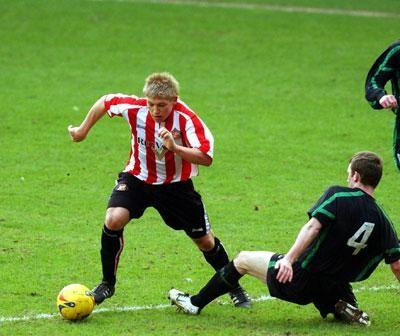
Martyn Waghorn playing for Sunderland U18s in 2007

In 1997, Sunderland joined the FA Premier Youth League, for the U18s teams of Premier League. Sunderland finished second in the North section. A year later, the league was renamed the FA Premier Academy League, was split into U19s and U17s divisions, and expanded to include selected academies from Football League teams. Sunderland fielded teams in all six seasons of this incarnation. In 2004, the league was restructured again, renamed the Premier Academy League, and reset to U18s only. Sunderland's best performance was in 2006–07 - they won group D, beat Manchester City in the Play-Off Semi-Final, but lost on penalties to Leicester City in the final. The Sunderland side included Jordan Henderson, Jack Colback and Martyn Waghorn.

Meanwhile, in 1999, Sunderland left the Central League as Champions and joined the newly formed Premier Reserve League aimed at U21 / Reserve teams of Premier League teams. They went on to win the Northern section in 2002–03, and again in 2008–09. By 2009, the winners of the North and South sections had a play-off to determine a 'National Champion'; Sunderland lost the final to Aston Villa.

=== Cups ===
Sunderland 'A' won the Durham Challenge Cup for the first time in 1894. They went on to dominate the cup in the 1900s, winning it six out of seven seasons. They remain the most successful team in the competition, having won it 21 times in total. Sunderland continue to field a team in the competition.

In 1952, the FA Youth Cup was formed, aimed at offering competitive games for youth players unable to break into senior teams. Sunderland had success in the competition in the 1960s, losing to Arsenal in the 1966 final, before beating Birmingham City in the final the following year, and West Bromwich Albion in the 1969 final. The 1967 team included Billy Hughes and the 1969 team included Richie Pitt, both of whom would go on to play for the senior team in the 1973 FA Cup Final.

In 1996, the Central League Cup was introduced to give U21 teams a cup competition in parallel to the FA Youth Cup. Sunderland won the cup twice, in 2009 and 2011, before switching to the Premier League Cup in 2013.

=== Academy Formation ===
In 2002, the Academy of Light was completed and inauguration took place with England manager Sven-Göran Eriksson. The Academy was a state-of-the-art £15m facility in South Tyneside, which doubled as the training location for the senior team. It opened officially the following year. The centre was designed to comply with UEFA five-star academy status.

In 2003, Kees Zwamborn was hired as Academy director. Zwamborn had been youth director at AFC Ajax, a club acclaimed for its youth development. He lasted just 14 months in the role, as Sunderland underwent a period of turmoil on and off the field. He was replaced with Ged McNamee. who remained in the role until 2016.

=== Post EPPP Restructuring ===
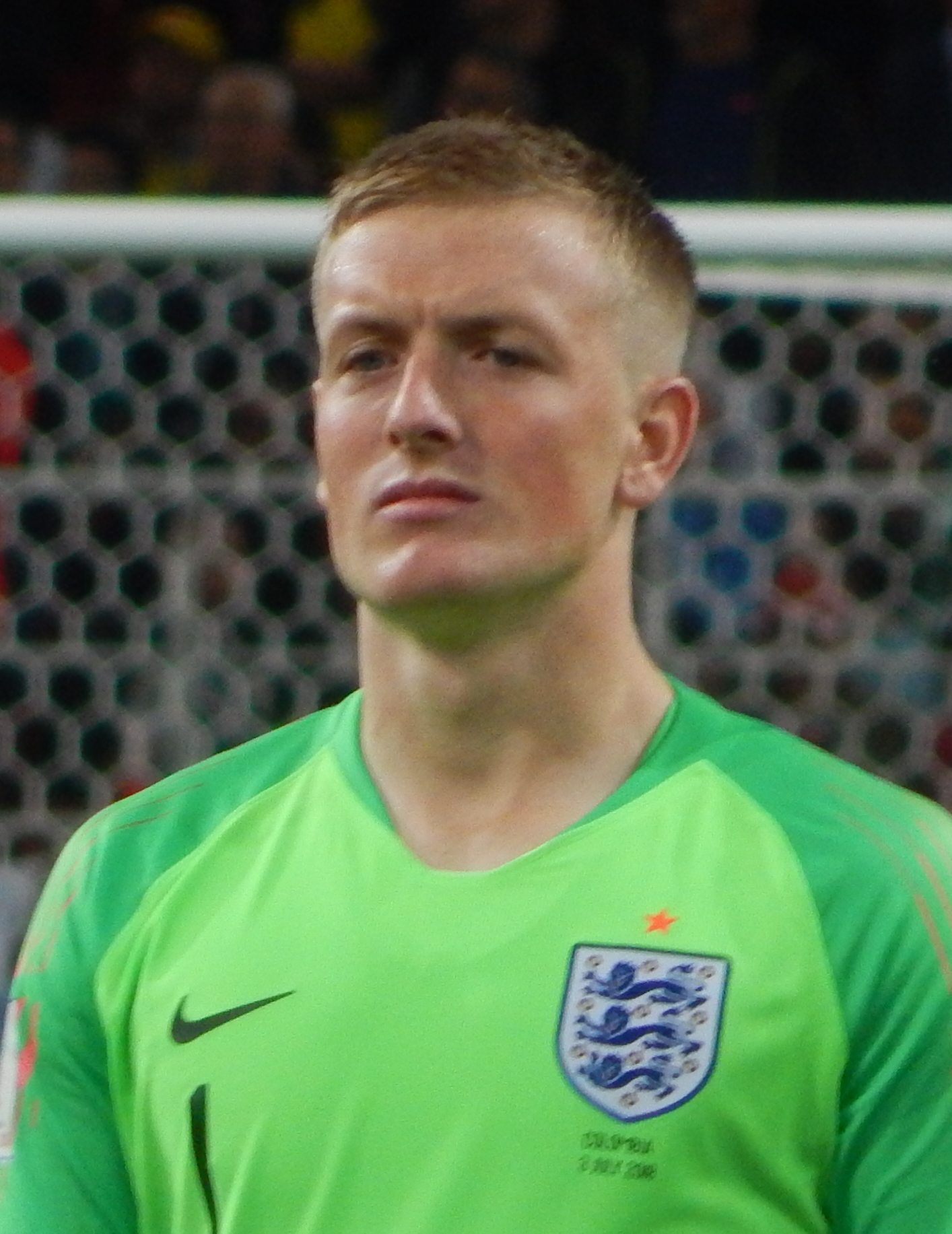
Jordan Pickford an academy graduate, represented England at every level, from U16 to senior

The Elite Player Performance Plan (EPPP) was introduced in 2011 and restructured the way youth development operated in England. Academies were graded into tiers, based on a variety of factors, including the quality of the facilities available. Category 1 (Elite) was the highest rating. Academy teams would play against teams in the same academy category. Sunderland were awarded Category 1 status.

Sunderland's Category 1 status allowed them to join the inaugural U21 Premier League and U18 Premier League seasons in 2012–13. Sunderland's best finish in the U21 Premier League was in 2015–16 when they finished runner-up to Manchester United. Their success in that season meant they qualified for the Premier League International Cup. They competed in 2016–17, beating U21 teams from S.L. Benfica, PSV Eindhoven, Athletic Bilbao and Norwich City on their way to the final. They faced FC Porto at the Stadium of Light, losing 5–0 in front of a crowd of over 18,000. Sunderland's best U18 Premier League finish was in 2015–16 when they finished fifth.

In 2016–17, the U21 Premier League was rebranded Premier League 2, and was widened to U23 level. A second division was added, with Promotion and relegation between the two. Sunderland finished seventh in the first season of the Premier League 2, but finished second bottom (ahead of Manchester United) in the 2017–18 season, and were relegated to Division 2.

== Sunderland A.F.C. Under 21s ==
Premier League 2
- League cup(s): Premier League Cup; EFL Trophy
- International cup: Premier League International Cup
- Website: Official website
- Current: 2023–24 Premier League 2

Previously called Sunderland 'A', Sunderland II, Sunderland Reserves and Sunderland U23s, the Sunderland U21 team is the second team of Sunderland A.F.C. and the most senior team in the club's academy system. U21 matchday squads may include up to five outfield players and one goalkeeper over the age of 21; this may include players from the senior team in need of game time.

Sunderland U21s play in Division 2 of the Premier League 2 following relegation from Division 1 in the 2017–18 season. They finished fifth in the 2020–21 season, beat Stoke City in the play-off semi-final, but lost on penalties to Crystal Palace in the final after a 0-0 draw. They represent Sunderland in the Durham Challenge Cup, a competition that the club (originally as the senior team, but from 1894-onwards as the reserve team) have won a record 21 times. They shared the trophy with Spennymoor Town in 2020 after the final was cancelled due to the COVID-19 pandemic. It was the first victory in the trophy for Sunderland as the previously called U23's. They also take part in the Premier League Cup, though have yet to progress beyond the Round-of-16 stage.

Sunderland U21s (effectively the previously called U23s team) also took part in two seasons of the EFL Trophy against senior professional teams from the bottom two divisions of the English Football League. In the 2016–17 competition, Sunderland qualified from their group after victories over Hartlepool United and Notts County but were beaten in the first knockout stage by the academy of Wolves. In the 2017–18 competition, Sunderland failed to qualify from their group. They were unable to take part in the 2018–19 competition as the senior team were competing in the competition for the first time after relegation to EFL League One. Following the promotion of the senior team via the League One Play-off to the EFL Championship the format was changed from U23s to U21s and now allows U21s matchday squads to include up to five outfield players and one goalkeeper over the age of 21; this may include players from the senior team in need of game time.

=== Current squad ===
As of 24 October 2026

Note: Flags indicate national team as defined under FIFA eligibility rules; some limited exceptions apply. Players may hold more than one non-FIFA nationality.

No.	Pos.	Nation	Player
33	DF	ENG	Bayley Hester (on loan at Heaton Stannington)
38	MF	ENG	Charlie Dinsdale
40	MF	ENG	Jack Whittaker
43	DF	ENG	Luke Bell (on loan at Darlington)
44	GK	NIR	Ben Metcalf
45	MF	ENG	Liam Hunt
46	FW	ARM	Finn Geragusyan
47	FW	BEL	Trey Samuel-Ogunsuyi (on loan at Shrewsbury Town)
48	DF	ENG	Jenson Jones
49	FW	ENG	Felix Scott

No.	Pos.	Nation	Player
52	MF	ENG	Jaydon Jones (on loan at Hebburn Town)
53	DF	ENG	Finlay Holcroft (on loan at Spennymoor Town)
54	DF	ENG	Joe Neild
55	FW	AUS	Marcus Neill
58	DF	ENG	Ben Kindon
59	DF	ENG	Archie Lightfoot
—	GK	ENG	Isaac Allan (on loan at Hebburn Town)
—	GK	ENG	Matty Young (on loan at Huddersfield Town)
—	DF	GRN	Josh Lett

=== Honours ===
- Northern Football Alliance (5)
  - Winners as Sunderland 'A': 1891, 1893, 1894, 1895, 1896
- Durham Challenge Cup (18)
  - Winners as Sunderland 'A': 1894, 1901, 1902, 1903, 1904, 1906, 1907, 1912, 1913, 1919, 1922, 1923, 1925, 1928, 1929
  - Winners as Sunderland Reserves: 1966, 2008
  - Winners as Sunderland U23s: 2020^{[A]}
- North Eastern League (9)
  - Winners as Sunderland 'A': 1925, 1927, 1928, 1929, 1930, 1934, 1937
  - Winners as Sunderland II: 1948, 1953
- North Regional League (1)
  - Winners as Sunderland Reserves:1969
- The Central League (1)
  - Winners as Sunderland Reserves: 1999
- Premier Reserve League Northern Division (2)
  - Winners as Sunderland Reserves: 2003, 2009
- Central League Cup (2)
  - Winners as Sunderland Reserves:: 2009, 2011

Post EPPP:

- U21 Premier League
  - Runner-up: 2016
- Premier League International Cup:
  - Runner-up: 2017

== Sunderland A.F.C. Under 18s ==
U18 Premier League
- Domestic cup(s): FA Youth Cup; U18 Premier League Cup
- International cup: UEFA Youth League
- Website: Official website
- Current: 2023–24 U18 Premier League

Previously called Sunderland Youths, Sunderland U17s and Sunderland U19s, the Sunderland U18s team is the third team of Sunderland A.F.C. and the club's senior youth team. Dating back to the 1950s, the team consists of players beyond school-age on youth contracts. Youth players can be promoted into the U21 or senior teams, but due to EPPP rules, will still remain on youth contracts.

Sunderland U18s play in the Category 1 North section of U18 Premier League. They finished bottom of the league in the 2020-21 season. They also compete in the FA Youth Cup, a competition Sunderland have won twice. They play their home games at the Academy of Light.

=== Current squad ===
As of 24 October 2026

Note: Flags indicate national team as defined under FIFA eligibility rules; some limited exceptions apply. Players may hold more than one non-FIFA nationality.

No.	Pos.	Nation	Player
60	GK	ENG	Joe Cowan
63	MF	NZL	Alex Lienard
70	MF	ENG	Kay Munyakazi
75	MF	ENG	Charlie Scorer
77	MF	ENG	Tom Proctor
84	FW	ENG	James Barker
—	GK	ENG	Josh Jones
—	GK	ENG	Finn Robertson
—	DF	ENG	Aaron Bowman
—	DF	ENG	Charlie Dolan-Dent
—	DF	ENG	Charlie Hamilton-Forsyth
—	DF	ENG	Joe Makepeace
—	DF	ENG	Alfie Pollock
—	DF	ENG	Robert Walton

No.	Pos.	Nation	Player
—	MF	ENG	Ethan Berry
—	MF	ENG	Jay Brown
—	MF	ENG	Wess Brown
—	MF	NIR	Matthew Burns
—	MF	ENG	Jay Matadeen
—	MF	ENG	Adam Nelson
—	MF	POR	Elias Pinto
—	MF	ENG	Harvey Thompson
—	MF	ENG	Noah White
—	FW	ENG	Lewis Campbell
—	FW	ENG	Harry Hunter
—	FW	ENG	Caleb Shakespeare
—	FW	ENG	Triziano Wilson

=== Honours ===
- FA Youth Cup (2)
  - Winners: 1967, 1969
  - Runner-up: 1966
- Premier Academy League
  - Runner-up: 2007

== Notable Youth & Academy Graduates ==
Selected players who came through Sunderland youth system. 1966 onwards

- (England) Stan Anderson
- (Scotland) Jim McNab
- (England) Jimmy Montgomery
- (Scotland) Billy Hughes
- (England) Colin Todd
- (England) Richie Pitt
- (England) Dave Elliott
- (England) Micky Horswill
- (England) Gary Rowell
- (England) Kevin Arnott
- (Scotland) Gordon Chisholm
- (England) Colin West
- (England) Nick Pickering
- (England) Barry Venison
- (Wales) John Cornforth
- (England) Barry Richardson
- (England) Gordon Armstrong
- (England) Gary Owers
- (England) Brian Atkinson
- (Republic of Ireland) Kieron Brady
- (England) Michael Gray
- (England) David Preece
- (England) Paul Heckingbottom
- (England) Darren Holloway
- (England) Michael Bridges
- (England) Paul Thirlwell
- (England) Michael Proctor
- (Republic of Ireland) Brendan McGill
- (Republic of Ireland) Thomas Butler
- (Scotland) Kevin Kyle
- (Northern Ireland) George McCartney
- (Saint Kitts and Nevis) Gerard Williams
- (Republic of Ireland) Cliff Byrne
- (England) Chris Brown
- (Republic of Ireland) Richie Ryan
- (England) Lee Robinson
- (England) Grant Leadbitter
- (England) Ben Alnwick
- (England) Peter Hartley
- (England) Jack Colback
- (England) Jordan Cook
- (England) Martyn Waghorn
- (England) Jordan Henderson
- (England) Ryan Noble
- (Republic of Ireland) Conor Hourihane
- (England) Blair Adams
- (England) Liam Noble
- (Republic of Ireland) John Egan
- (England) Louis Laing
- (England) Jak Alnwick
- (Scotland) Mikael Mandron
- (England) George Honeyman
- (England) Jordan Pickford
- (United States) Lynden Gooch
- (England) Ethan Robson
- (Nigeria) Josh Maja
- (Sweden) Joel Asoro
- (England) Bali Mumba
- (England) Andrew Nelson
- (Australia) Tom Beadling
- (England) Michael Ledger
- (England) Luke Molyneux
- (Poland) Max Stryjek
- (England) Dan Neil
- (England) Anthony Patterson
- (England) Elliot Embleton
- (England) Chris Rigg
- (England) Tom Watson

== Notes ==
A.: Trophy was shared with Spennymoor Town after the final was cancelled due to the COVID 19 Pandemic.
