= Kevin Arnott =

Kevin Arnott may refer to:

- Kevin Arnott (cricketer) (born 1961), former Zimbabwean cricketer
- Kevin Arnott (footballer) (born 1958), English footballer
