= Melker Ellborg =

Swedish footballer (born 2003)

- Ellborg with Sunderland in 2026

Personal information
- Full name: Melker Åke Ellborg
- Date of birth: 22 May 2003 (age 23)
- Place of birth: Kalmar, Sweden
- Height: 1.91 m (6 ft 3 in)
- Position: Goalkeeper

Team information
- Current team: Sunderland
- Number: 31

Youth career
- –2017: IFK Berga
- 2019–2020: Malmö FF

Senior career*
Years	Team	Apps	(Gls)
2017–2019	IFK Berga	1	(0)
2021–2025	Malmö FF	7	(0)
2022	→ IFK Malmö (loan)	14	(0)
2023	→ Ariana FC (loan)	12	(0)
2024	→ Trelleborgs FF (loan)	4	(0)
2026–	Sunderland	3	(0)

International career
2018–2019	Sweden U17	8	(0)
2021–2023	Sweden U19	7	(0)
- * Club domestic league appearances and goals as of 23:50, 22 March 2026 (UTC)

Melker Åke Ellborg (born 22 May 2003) is a Swedish professional footballer who plays as a goalkeeper for Premier League club Sunderland.

== Club career ==
=== Malmö FF ===
Ellborg began training with IFK Berga's senior team when he was 12. He notably made his senior debut at age 13, playing 20 minutes of a friendly game vs. Älmeboda/Linnaryd. He trialed as a teen with Juventus, but ahead of the 2019 season he chose to sign for Malmö FF. He spent two years in the club’s academy before being promoted to the first team prior to the 2021 season. For three successive years, Ellborg was loaned out to three different Scanian clubs, IFK Malmö, Ariana FC, and Trelleborgs FF.

In February 2025, acting on the advice of new goalkeeping coach Zlatan Azinović, previously the U19 goalkeeping coach, the club extended his contract by four years and chose to keep hold of Ellborg as a back-up keeper. Because of Johan Dahlin's ACL injury and Brazilian goalkeeper Ricardo Friedrich dwindling form, Ellborg was selected for his Malmö FF debut on 18 May 2025, keeping a clean sheet in a 3–0 win against Halmstads BK. With Sweden international Robin Olsen's arrival in the summer of 2025, Ellborg saw his playing time diminish. He ended the season with five clean sheets in seven Allsvenskan games, and was heavily praised for his Europa League campaign. As a result of his strong performances despite not being a nailed on starter, at the end of 2025 Manchester United reportedly held an interest in signing Ellborg.

=== Sunderland ===
On 31 January 2026, Ellborg was sold to Sunderland. The transfer sum reportedly landed on a record-breaking 42 million SEK plus additional bonuses, or just under €4 million. The transfer became the most expensive goalkeeper transfer in Allsvenskan history, breaking the previous record of Hákon Valdimarsson's move to Brentford for 40 million SEK.

Ellborg made his first appearance for Sunderland in a Premier League match against Leeds on 3 March 2026, keeping a clean sheet in a 1–0 win. He made his debut in an Emirates FA Cup fifth round game at Port Vale on 8 March 2026 which Sunderland lost 1–0.

== International career ==
Ellborg is a youth international for Sweden.

== Style of play ==
His longtime goalkeeping coach Zlatan Azinović has described Ellborg as having an "exceptional gripping technique".

== Personal life ==
Although he was born and raised in Kalmar, already as a child Ellborg supported Malmö FF due to the influence of his best friend. Ellborg’s paternal grandfather's brother, Folke Ellborg, was chairman of Kalmar FF between 1972–1976 and then 1989–1993.

== Career statistics ==
As of match played 28 October 2026

Appearances and goals by club, season and competition
Club	Season	League			National cup (Note: Includes Svenska Cupen, FA Cup)		League cup (Note: Includes EFL Cup)		Europe		Other		Total	
Club	Season	Division	Apps	Goals	Apps	Goals	Apps	Goals	Apps	Goals	Apps	Goals	Apps	Goals
Malmö FF	2020	Allsvenskan	0	0	0	0	—		0	0	—		0	0
Malmö FF	2021	Allsvenskan	0	0	0	0	—		0	0	—		0	0
Malmö FF	2022	Allsvenskan	0	0	0	0	—		0	0	—		0	0
Malmö FF	2023	Allsvenskan	0	0	0	0	—		—		—		0	0
Malmö FF	2025	Allsvenskan	7	0	3	0	—		7 (Note: Two appearances in UEFA Champions League, five appearances in UEFA Europa League)	0	—		17	0
Malmö FF	Total		7	0	3	0	—		7	0	—		17	0
IFK Malmö (loan)	2022	Ettan	14	0	—		—		—		—		14	0
Ariana FC (loan)	2023	Ettan	12	0	—		—		—		—		12	0
Trelleborgs FF (loan)	2024	Superettan	3	0	2	0	—		—		—		5	0
Sunderland	2025–26	Premier League	3	0	1	0	—		—		—		4	0
Sunderland	2026–27	Premier League	0	0	0	0	2	0	0	0	—		2	0
Sunderland	Total		3	0	1	0	2	0	0	0	—		6	0
Career total			39	0	6	0	2	0	7	0	0	0	54	0
