= Joshua Lett =

Grenadian footballer (born 2004)

Personal information
- Full name: Joshua Matthew Lett
- Date of birth: 9 September 2004 (age 22)
- Place of birth: Ealing, England
- Height: 1.76 m (5 ft 9 in)
- Position: Left-back

Team information
- Current team: Sunderland

Youth career
- 2017–2025: Southampton
- 2025–: Sunderland

International career^{‡}
Years	Team	Apps	(Gls)
2025–	Grenada	1	(0)
- ‡ National team caps and goals as of 22:00, 16 November 2025 (UTC)

Joshua Matthew Lett (born 9 September 2004) is a professional footballer who plays as a left-back for the Premier League club Sunderland. Born in England, he plays for the Grenada national team.

== Club career ==
A youth product of Southampton since 2017, Lett signed his first contract with the club on 23 July 2023 until 2025 and was promoted to their U21 team. On 12 June 2025, he was released by Southampton with 9 other youngsters after they were relegated from the Premier League. On 30 August 2025, he joined Sunderland and was assigned to their U21s.

== International career ==
Born in England, Lett is of Grenadian descent. He was called up to the Grenada national team for a set of friendlies in October 2025.
