= Trey Samuel-Ogunsuyi =

Belgian footballer (born 2006)

Personal information
- Full name: Trey Osamuyimen Samuel-Ogunsuyi
- Date of birth: 26 November 2006 (age 19)
- Place of birth: Bradford, England
- Height: 1.90 m (6 ft 3 in)
- Position: Striker

Team information
- Current team: Sunderland

Youth career
- 2016–: Sunderland

Senior career*
Years	Team	Apps	(Gls)
2025–	Sunderland	0	(0)
2025	→ Falkirk (loan)	9	(0)
2026	→ Shrewsbury Town (loan)	12	(2)

International career^{‡}
2023–2024	Belgium U18	4	(1)
2024–	Belgium U19	2	(0)
- * Club domestic league appearances and goals as of 20:59, 16 April (UTC) ‡ National team caps and goals as of 15 October 2024

Trey Osamuyimen Samuel-Ogunsuyi (born 26 November 2006) is a Belgian professional footballer who plays as a striker for Premier League club Sunderland.

== Club career ==
=== Sunderland ===
Samuel-Ogunsuyi joined the Sunderland academy at the age of 10. He made his first team debut on 11 January 2025 as a late substitute in a 1–2 FA Cup defeat against Stoke City.

==== Loan to Falkirk ====
On 30 August 2025, he joined Scottish Premiership club Falkirk on a season-long loan. Having only started two league games Falkirk, Trey returned to Sunderland in January 2026.

==== Loan to Shrewsbury Town ====
On 9 January 2026, Trey joined EFL League Two club Shrewsbury Town on loan till the end of the 2025–26 season.

Trey scored his first and second professional goals in the same match coming against Chesterfield in the 45+2nd minute and 70th minute respectively, coming out 3–2 winners.

== International career ==
Born in England, Samuel-Ogunsuyi is also eligible to play for Belgium and Nigeria due to ancestry. He was called up to the Belgium Under-19s in October 2024.

== Career statistics ==
=== Club ===
As of match played 3 December 2025

Appearances and goals by club, season and competition
Club	Season	League			National cup (Note: Includes FA Cup, Scottish Cup)		League cup (Note: Includes EFL Cup, Scottish League Cup)		Other		Total	
Club	Season	Division	Apps	Goals	Apps	Goals	Apps	Goals	Apps	Goals	Apps	Goals
Sunderland	2024-25	Championship	0	0	1	0	0	0	0	0	1	0
Sunderland	2025-26	Premier League	0	0	0	0	0	0	—		0	0
Sunderland	Total		0	0	1	0	0	0	0	0	1	0
Falkirk (loan)	2025–26	Scottish Premiership	9	0	0	0	0	0	—		9	0
Career total			8	0	1	0	0	0	0	0	9	0
