= Tony Lee (footballer, born 1947) =

English footballer (1947–2023)

Personal information
- Full name: John Anthony Lee
- Date of birth: 26 November 1947
- Place of birth: Middlesbrough, England
- Date of death: 12 February 2023 (aged 75)
- Position: Right winger

Youth career
- Cargo Fleet
- –1965: Stockton

Senior career*
Years	Team	Apps	(Gls)
1965–1967	Leicester City	0	(0)
1967–196?	Bradford City	8	(3)
196?–1968	Stockton		
1968–1969	Darlington	14	(1)
1969–1970	South Shields		
1970–197?	Hartlepool United	0	(0)
- Scarborough
- Goole Town
- Whitby Town

Managerial career
- 1980–1985: Whitby Town
- 1985–1990: Billingham Synthonia
- 1990–1991: Gateshead
- 1994–2001: Bishop Auckland
- 2001–2003: Spennymoor United
- 2003–2004: Spennymoor United
- 2004: Spennymoor United
- 2005–2006: Newcastle Blue Star
- 2006–2007: Gateshead
- 2012–2013: Celtic Nation
- 2013: Billingham Town
- 2013: Bishop Auckland
- * Club domestic league appearances and goals

John Anthony Lee (26 November 1947 – 12 February 2023) was an English footballer who played on the right wing in the Football League for Bradford City and Darlington.

== Playing career ==
He played for Stockton as a youngster, was on the books of Leicester City and Hartlepool United without settling in the area at Leicester in first team squad at 17 outstanding talent and also played non-league football for Stockton, South Shields, and Goole Town. He also played for Cargo Fleet, Scarborough, and Whitby Town.

== Coaching career ==
After his playing career ended, he went into management at the non-league level, with clubs including Whitby Town, Billingham Synthonia, Gateshead (two spells), South Bank, Bishop Auckland (two spells), Spennymoor United (three spells), Newcastle Blue Star, Celtic Nation, and Billingham Town.

He also acted as a scout for Darlington when his son Graeme Lee, himself a former league footballer, was a player at the club.

Tony died on 12 February 2023 due to illness.
