= Academy of Light =

Coordinates: 54.943525°N 1.3896847°W

- AOL
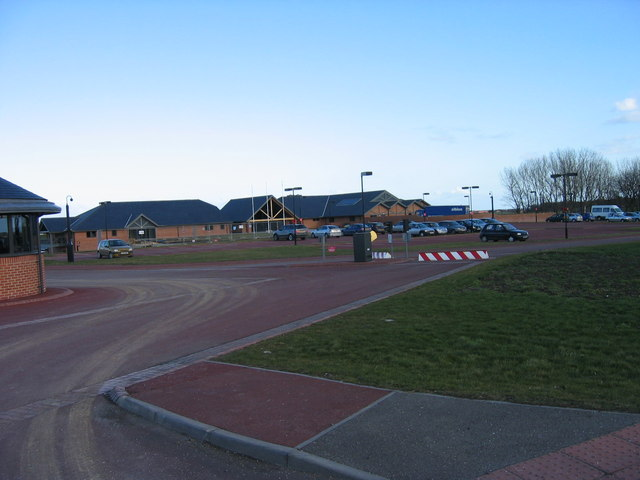
- Entrance to the Academy of Light
- Interactive map of Academy of Light
- Location: Cleadon, Tyne and Wear
- Owner: Sunderland AFC
- Type: Sports facility

Construction
- Built: 2001
- Opened: 2003
- Cost: £10 million (initial); £13 million (total)

Website
- http://www.safc.com/page/Academy

The Academy of Light is the name of the UEFA five star certified training facilities and youth academy for English football club Sunderland A.F.C.

Officially opened in March 2003, the Academy of Light is a state-of-the-art training facility in Cleadon - just north of Sunderland. It covers an area of 220 acres (0.89 km^{2}) of which 60 acres dedicated to football. It replaced the aging Charlie Hurley Centre, located nearby. The site is used as the primary training facility for the first team, but is also used to train the youngsters in Sunderland's U23 and U18 teams, it's the location of Sunderland's U18 home games, and is also the home of Sunderland A.F.C. Ladies.

The academy plans were the focus of protests from local residents who were angered at the development on a green belt. After withdrawing initial ambitious plans, the club submitted new plans in 1999 which were rejected by South Tyneside Council. Following a public inquiry, Sunderland launched a successful appeal, and work began on the academy in 2001. Before building work was complete, Sunderland submitted plans for expansion to the site, to include indoor training facilities, which The Football Association had added to the list of necessary facilities for academies to achieve Category 1 status. Plans were rejected, and a further appeal was also rejected, meaning Sunderland were forced to use a disused ice rink in Sunderland City Centre for indoor training. Indoor facilities were finally added to the Academy of Light in an expansion completed in 2012.

The initial site cost over £10 million to build, with the indoor training facility expansion costing an extra £3m.

== Proposal and construction ==
In 1997 Sunderland A.F.C. moved to a new home (the Stadium of Light) and club owner Bob Murray put forward proposals for a new world-class academy with the aim of securing Sunderland's long-term future.

The academy was to be built on acquired land opposite Sunderland's current training ground, on disused farmland in an area known as Whitburn Moor. From the outset, the proposals were beset with problems. Sunderland's training ground was on the green belt between Sunderland and South Shields. Planning permission for building on the green belt is only granted in exceptional circumstances. Sunderland's original plans were ambitious - among them, the club planned to build an indoor training centre and hostel. Local opposition was fierce, claiming that an area of rural wildlife would be destroyed and the green belt would be weakened, causing a merging of the conurbations of City of Sunderland and South Tyneside. A residents protest group, called the Green Belt Action Group (GBAG) were formed. Sunderland were forced to withdraw the submission.

=== Revised plans ===
In 1999 the club resubmitted a proposal, for the same site as the previous plan, but in which the height of the new developments would not be built any higher than the existing agricultural buildings. New lighting technology would reduce the effect of floodlights on the local area, and extensive re-seeding would benefit wildlife on the site. In total, the academy would have a 12% smaller 'footprint' than the original farm buildings. The club also stated that ten sites around Sunderland and County Durham had been assessed but were found to be unsuitable. Despite being recommended for acceptance by planning inspectors, the Local Planning Authority rejected the proposal on the grounds that it encroached on the green belt.

Sunderland appealed, and following a public inquiry in September 1999, the Secretary of State for the Environment John Prescott overturned the ruling in February 2000, stating that the benefits the academy would bring to the community and region justified building on the green-belt. He was convinced that Sunderland had rigorously investigated alternative sites, and he went on to say that the green-belt would not be in danger, as the site had a smaller footprint than the previous site layout. Following the ruling, the GBAG continued to protest against the plans. They felt the landscaping plans would ruin the 'rural' appearance of the area, and the fencing and mounding would create a 'visual barrier'. One of their biggest criticisms was that Sunderland were 'moving the goalposts', as their building plans were significantly different from those originally submitted in 1999.

In 2001, detailed building plans were rejected by South Tyneside Metropolitan Borough Council's planning committee, again on grounds on green belt encroachment. Sunderland appealed, and a month later planning permission was given. Work began in November 2001, marked by a ground-breaking ceremony in January 2002 with England national football team manager Sven-Göran Eriksson.

=== Construction and further controversy ===
Shortly after beginning construction work, Sunderland enraged the site protesters by resubmitted plans for further amendments to the site. The addition of an indoor 'training barn' and an on-site hostel were seen by Sunderland to be essential requirements to keeping the site at Academy status. Sunderland claimed that in 1999 these elements were desired but unrealistic, but in 2001 they had been added to the list of essential Academy elements by the FA in their new Elite Player Performance Plan, and therefore to retain Academy status, Sunderland were obliged to include them in the plans.

Sunderland submitted the application in May 2002, and in August the plans were rejected by South Tyneside council, who said: We felt they were inappropriate for the green belt. Again Sunderland appealed, and a public inquiry was launched in April 2003. In November of that year, Deputy Prime Minister John Prescott rejected Sunderland's revised plans claiming the new elements would "cause significant harm to the openness and visual amenity of this sensitive part of the green belt." This ruling came despite Sunderland's argument that similar green belt developments at Manchester United, Arsenal and Middlesbrough had been accepted. By this point, the initial phase of the academy had been built, with area set aside for the proposed indoor barn and hostel. The ruling meant that in order to retain Academy status, Sunderland would have to find alternative sites for those elements of the academy, or abandon and relocate the entire centre. In January 2004 Sunderland City Council came to the rescue of Sunderland by offering the ice rink at the Crowtree Leisure Centre as a site for the indoor training area. The rink, in the centre of the city, was leased to Sunderland AFC for an initial two-years. The offer effectively saved the club's Academy status.

=== Indoor Facility Expansion ===
In 2009, plans were once again submitted for indoor training facilities, due to the impending closure of the Crowtree Leisure Centre. Chairman Niall Quinn announced proposals for a training barn which, following extensive consultation with local residents, would be built 5 metres lower than the original plan, making it no higher than the other academy buildings. The plans were approved in 2010 and a £3m indoor extension to the site was finally opened on 7 December 2012 by Trevor Brooking.

The indoor facility is 82.4m wide, 64m long, and has an internal clearance of 10m. It has a translucent PVC roof to allow the 3G Artificial turf pitch to be illuminated by natural light.

== Academy status ==
The club gained Category 1 (Elite) academy status despite not having an indoor training pitch onsite, as a result Sunderland compete in the Professional Development League as a Category 1 (Elite) academy. These requirements for Category 1, as outlined in the Elite Player Performance Plan, are wide-reaching, and include indoor and outdoor training facilities, education provisions, and dedicated youth training areas. Academy status is regularly assessed, and Sunderland maintained their status when assessed in 2013.

Following Sunderland's relegation to EFL League One in 2018, they became the only club with a Category 1 academy outside of the top two divisions of English football. The club was purchased by Stewart Donald in May 2018 and he revealed that the cost of maintaining Category 1 status was £4m per year. Despite this, Donald insisted that maintaining Sunderland's category 1 academy status was a priority.

== Environmental development ==
During construction, Sunderland enlisted the help of famous Ecologist David Bellamy to advise in the development of the area surrounding the academy.

Wetland was introduced, and water used to wet the pitches at the academy is recycled back into these wetlands. A large area of woodland was also planted, using a variety of tree types. The academy area only accounts for 60 acres (240,000 m^{2}) of the 220-acre (0.89 km^{2}) site. The remainder is a wildlife preserve.
