= 2006–07 FA Premier Academy League =

English football league season

The 2006–07 Premier Academy League Under–18 season was the tenth edition since the establishment of The Premier Academy League, and the 3rd under the current make-up. The first match of the season was played in August 2006, and the season ended in May 2007.

Leicester City U18 were the champions.

== Final league tables ==
=== Academy Group A ===
Pos	Club	Pld	W	D	L	F	A	GD	Pts
1	Arsenal U18s (C)	28	20	5	3	75	38	+37	65
2	West Ham United U18s	28	17	6	5	50	36	+14	57
3	Chelsea U18s	28	16	5	7	46	30	+16	53
4	Southampton U18s	28	16	2	10	66	44	+22	50
5	Crystal Palace U18s	28	14	8	6	60	45	+15	50
6	Ipswich Town U18s	28	10	8	10	48	47	+1	38
7	Charlton Athletic U18s	28	9	7	12	47	50	-3	34
8	Millwall U18s	28	7	8	13	38	56	-18	29
9	Norwich City U18s	28	7	1	20	26	51	-23	22
10	Fulham U18s	28	4	7	17	32	62	-30	19

=== Academy Group C ===
Pos	Club	Pld	W	D	L	F	A	GD	Pts
1	Manchester City U18s (C)	28	21	3	4	63	28	+35	66
2	Bolton Wanderers U18s	28	14	6	8	38	26	+12	48
3	Blackburn Rovers U18s	28	13	7	8	47	34	+13	46
4	Manchester United U18s	28	12	4	12	51	42	+9	40
5	West Bromwich Albion U18s	28	12	2	14	44	45	-1	38
6	Everton U18s	28	6	13	9	38	38	0	31
7	Crewe Alexandra U18s	28	9	3	16	44	57	-13	30
8	Liverpool U18s	28	7	8	13	29	37	-8	29
9	Wolverhampton Wanderers U18s	28	6	7	15	30	52	-22	25
10	Stoke City U18s	28	3	5	20	14	53	-39	14

== Play-off semi-finals ==
5 May 2007

Sunderland U18s	3–2	Manchester City U18s

Attendance: TBA

5 May 2007

Leicester City U18s	3–2	Arsenal U18s

== Play-off Final ==
20 May 2007
11:00

Sunderland U18s	2 – 2 (a.e.t.)	Leicester City U18s
Penalties
	3 – 4

Stadium of Light, Sunderland

== See also ==
- Premier Reserve League
- FA Youth Cup
- Football League Youth Alliance
- Premier League
- The Football League
