= Gary Rowell =

English footballer and newspaper columnist (1957–2025)

Personal information
- Full name: Gary Rowell
- Date of birth: 6 June 1957
- Place of birth: Sunderland, England
- Date of death: 13 December 2025 (aged 68)
- Height: 5 ft 10 in (1.78 m)
- Positions: Forward; midfielder

Senior career*
Years	Team	Apps	(Gls)
1974–1984	Sunderland	257	(88)
1984–1985	Norwich City	6	(1)
1985–1986	Middlesbrough	27	(10)
1986–1988	Brighton & Hove Albion	12	(0)
1988	→ Dundee (loan)	1	(0)
1988	Carlisle United	7	(0)
1988–1990	Burnley	19	(1)
Total		329	(100)

International career
1977	England U21	1	(0)
- * Club domestic league appearances and goals

Gary Rowell (6 June 1957 – 13 December 2025) was an English footballer, most notably with Sunderland, and later a local newspaper columnist in north east England.

== Career ==
Born in Sunderland and raised in Seaham, he left school and joined Sunderland as an apprentice in 1972. His professional career was split (1976–84) between playing as a striker for two seasons (albeit often coming from deep) but mainly playing in midfield. He scored 103 goals for The Rokerites in all competitions, surpassing the previous record post-war goalscorer, Len Shackleton, who had scored 101 goals. Rowell's record stood until it in turn was beaten by Kevin Phillips in the early 21st century.

Gary was a talented player who many supporters felt was destined to become 'fully' capped by England. Unfortunately, his career was severely disrupted by a serious knee injury that he sustained during a game against Leyton Orient (in which he had already scored the winning goal) during March 1979. Following a lengthy recovery, Rowell continued to score goals in the First Division at a healthy strike-rate, but he always looked likely to struggle to maintain full fitness for the whole of any season.

Sunderland manager Len Ashurst forced Rowell out of Roker Park as part of a huge rebuilding plan in 1984, part of the slide which would ultimately take them to the third tier of English football for the first time in the club's history. Rowell moved to Norwich City in the summer of 1984, but never recreated his goalscoring exploits because of a knee injury he picked up on his first pre season tour with the Canaries. The injury would ultimately blight the rest of his career, although he did go on to play for Middlesbrough, Brighton & Hove Albion and Carlisle United before finishing his career with Burnley.

Rowell is remembered by Sunderland supporters for scoring a hat-trick for Sunderland in a 4–1 win away at local rivals Newcastle United on 24 February 1979. Describing the match later, he said "When we hit the 4th I had a chat with Kevin Arnott about whether to try for a fifth or just to take the piss. We decided to take the piss."

== Later life ==
Rowell later worked as a financial consultant and a radio pundit.

As radio summariser he worked with Real Radio, commentating on all Sunderland games, having had previously spent seven years covering Sunderland's games on Metro Radio and Magic 1152.

In 2005, he was voted Sunderland's all-time cult hero on the television programme Football Focus, whilst in 2006, Sunderland fanzine A Love Supreme voted him their Best Player of the 1980s. Such accolades reflect his almost 'iconic' status on Wearside, which has led him to recently be inducted in to the Sunderland A.F.C Hall of Fame.

== Death ==
Rowell died from leukemia on 13 December 2025, at the age of 68.
