= Kevin Arnott (footballer) =

English footballer

Personal information
- Full name: Kevin William Arnott
- Date of birth: 28 September 1958 (age 68)
- Place of birth: Gateshead, England
- Height: 5 ft 10 in (1.78 m)
- Position: Midfielder

Youth career
- Sunderland

Senior career*
Years	Team	Apps	(Gls)
1976–1981	Sunderland	133	(16)
1981–1982	→ Blackburn Rovers (loan)	17	(2)
1982–1987	Sheffield United	121	(12)
1982–1983	→ Blackburn Rovers (loan)	12	(1)
1983	→ Rotherham United (loan)	9	(2)
1987–1988	Vasalund IF	30	(3)
1987–1988	→ Chesterfield (loan)	19	(1)
1988–1990	Chesterfield	52	(3)
1990–1991	Gateshead		
1991	Nykarleby IK	6	(1)
- * Club domestic league appearances and goals

Kevin William Arnott (born 28 September 1958) is an English former footballer who played as a midfielder for a number of clubs, most notably Sunderland, Sheffield United and Chesterfield.

Born in Gateshead, County Durham he represented England at youth level whilst a trainee at Sunderland and also had a spell in Swedish football.

== Career ==
=== Sunderland ===
Arnott was a talented midfielder with excellent vision and ball control, who came to prominence during Sunderland's First Division campaign in the 1976–77 season. He was one of a trio of young players to emerge that season, along with Gary Rowell and Shaun Elliott and remained a key player for several years, helping the team to promotion in 1980.

With the arrival of new manager Alan Durban however, Arnott fell out of favour and was loaned to Blackburn Rovers for a spell in 1981 before being placed on the transfer list valued at £350,000.

=== Sheffield United ===
Despite a sizable price tag being placed on him by Sunderland Arnott eventually joined Sheffield United on a free transfer, signed by his former Sunderland teammate and now Blades manager Ian Porterfield in 1982. Arriving at the start of the season he struggled to make an impact, spending most of the campaign out on loan, initially to Blackburn once more followed by a spell at Rotherham United.

The following season however, Arnott came into his own and was virtually ever present as United gained promotion from the then Third Division. Arnott remained at Bramall Lane until his release in 1987, making over 150 appearances for the South Yorkshire club in all competitions.

=== Vasalunds and Chesterfield ===
After leaving Sheffield United he signed for Swedish side Vasalund IF but again spent much of his time on loan, initially playing indoor soccer in Dallas before returning to England with Chesterfield. His move to Saltergate was made permanent in the summer of 1988 and he remained there until a knee injury put an end to his league playing career.

== Post professional career ==
Arnott continued to play non-league football for a period after his retirement, turning out for Gateshead and Hebburn. He later worked in his family building business in South Wearside.
