= Tom Lavery (footballer) =

Northern Irish footballer (born 2006)

Personal information
- Date of birth: 19 December 2005 (age 20)
- Position: Full back

Youth career
- 2014–2026: Sunderland

Senior career*
Years	Team	Apps	(Gls)
2025–2026	Sunderland	0	(0)
2025–2026	→ Cliftonville	18	(1)
2026	→ FC Halifax Town	9	(1)
2026-	Gateshead	0	(0)
- * Club domestic league appearances and goals as of 25 June 2026

Thomas Lavery (born 19 December 2005) is an English professional footballer who plays as a full-back for National League club Gateshead.

In August 2025, he joined NIFL Premiership side Cliftonville on loan. He scored his first league goal for Cliftonville on 6 December 2025, in a 2–2 draw against Glentoran. He was recalled by Sunderland in January 2026, and in the same month was loaned out to FC Halifax Town.

Following his release from Sunderland at the end of the 2025/26 season, he joined Gateshead on a 2-year deal, becoming new manager Lee Cattermole's first signing.
