= Matthew Burns (footballer) =

Northern Irish footballer (born 2008)

Personal information
- Full name: Matthew Evan Burns
- Date of birth: 16 September 2008 (age 18)
- Place of birth: Ballymoney, Northern Ireland
- Position: Midfielder

Team information
- Current team: Sunderland

Youth career
- 2025–: Sunderland

Senior career*
Years	Team	Apps	(Gls)
2024–2025	Coleraine	1	(0)

International career^{‡}
2023–2024	Northern Ireland U16	6	(0)
2024–	Northern Ireland U17	9	(0)
- * Club domestic league appearances and goals as of 29 June 2025 ‡ National team caps and goals as of 29 June 2025

Matthew Evan Burns (born 16 September 2008) is a Northern Irish professional footballer who plays as a midfielder for Premier League club Sunderland.

On 1 September 2024, he made his first team debut for NIFL Premiership side Coleraine, coming on as a late substitute in a 1–1 home draw against Larne.
