= Gateshead F.C. =

English football club

Gateshead
- Full name: Gateshead Football Club
- Nicknames: The Tynesiders, The Heed
- Founded: 1977
- Ground: Gateshead International Stadium
- Capacity: 11,800
- Chairman: Graham Wood
- Manager: Alun Armstrong
- League: National League
- 2025–26: National League, 18th of 24
- Website: gateshead-fc.com
Home colours	Away colours

Gateshead Football Club is a professional association football club based in Gateshead, Tyne and Wear, England. The club competes in the National League, the fifth level of the English football league system, and play their home matches at the Gateshead International Stadium.

Established in 1977 after Gateshead United folded, the club are known as the "Tynesiders" or the "Heed". There had been a Gateshead A.F.C. in the Football League from 1930 to 1960, which had folded before Gateshead United had been established. The current incarnation of the club began life in the Northern Premier League, winning Premier Division titles in the 1982–83 and 1985–86 seasons. However they were relegated from the Football Conference in 1984 and 1987. They secured promotion back to the Conference at the end of the 1989–90 season and remained there until another relegation in 1998. The club were further relegated from the Northern Premier League Premier Division in 2003.

Gateshead won the First Division play-offs in 2004 and the Premier Division play-offs in 2008, before winning promotion from the Conference North with a second-placed finish in 2008–09. Gateshead spent the next decade in the top-flight of English football's non-League system, losing a play-off final in 2014, before they were demoted to the National League North in 2019 due to financial irregularities. They returned to the National League after winning the National League North in 2021–22. They won their first FA Trophy title in the 2023–24 season having finished as runners-up in the previous competition.

== History ==
Chart of Gateshead's yearly table positions in the Football league since joining the Alliance Premier League in 1983-84.

The original Gateshead club was formed in 1899 as South Shields Adelaide and became members of the Football League in 1919. In 1930 financial problems saw the club moved to Gateshead, where they adopted the name of their new town. However, the club was voted out of the Football League in 1960 and folded in 1973. History repeated itself as the South Shields club formed to replace the original one was also moved to Gateshead, becoming Gateshead United in 1974. However, they were dissolved at the end of the 1976–77 season. A new club was established, taking over from United in the Northern Premier League. After three seasons in the bottom half of the table, they finished eleventh in 1980–81, also reaching the first round of the FA Cup for the first time, losing 1–0 at Lincoln City. The club finished fourth in the league the following season.

The 1982–83 season saw Gateshead win the Northern Premier League with a record points tally (100), scoring 114 goals in the process. As a result, the club were promoted to the Alliance Premier League. After a sixteenth-place finish in their first season in the league, they finished second-from-bottom in 1984–85 and were relegated back to the Northern Premier League. The following season saw the club win the Northern Premier League title and the league's Challenge Shield, earning an immediate return to the (now renamed) Football Conference. However, they lasted only one season in the Conference, and were relegated back to the Northern Premier League after finishing bottom of the table.

With the Northern Premier League having gained a second division, Gateshead became members of its Premier Division upon their return to the league. They finished eighteenth in 1987–88 and second-from-bottom the following season, but avoided relegation to Division One as no team was relegated to the league from the Conference. After this reprieve, the club were runners-up in 1989–90 and were promoted back to the Conference, as champions Colne Dynamoes were ineligible for promotion. The following seven seasons saw them in mid-table every season, but after finishing in the relegation zone in 1997–98, they returned to the Northern Premier League.

After two top-five finishes following their return, Gateshead finished in mid-table in 2000–01 and 2001–02. Although they were relegated to Division One at the end of the 2002–03 season, a sixth-place finish in 2003–04 was sufficient to secure a return to the Premier Division due to the creation of the Conference North and South leading to many clubs leaving the Premier Division. A third-place finish in the Premier Division in 2007–08 saw the club qualify for the promotion play-offs, and after defeating Eastwood Town 4–0 in the semi-finals, they beat Buxton 2–0 in the final to earn promotion to the Conference North.

In the 2008–09 season, Gateshead were Conference North runners-up. In the subsequent play-offs, they beat Southport 2–1 on aggregate in the semi-finals, before a 1–0 win over AFC Telford United in the final saw them promoted to the Conference National. The club adopted a full-time squad for the first time for the 2010–11 season. In 2013–14, the club finished third in the league, qualifying for the promotion play-offs. They beat Grimsby Town 4–2 on aggregate in the semi-finals, setting up a Wembley final against Cambridge United, which they lost 2–1. In the following season the club reached the third round of the FA Cup for the first time; wins over Norton United in the first round and Warrington Town in the second led to a third-round tie with Premier League side West Bromwich Albion, with Gateshead losing 7–0. The club were suspended from the National League in May 2019 due to financial irregularities, and were demoted to the National League North the following month.

The curtailed 2019–20 season saw Gateshead finish seventh (with the league table calculated on points-per-game), qualifying for the play-offs. However, after beating Brackley Town on penalties after a 1–1 draw in the first round, they lost 5–3 to Boston United in the semi-finals. In 2021–22 Gateshead were National League North champions, earning promotion back to the National League. The 2022–23 season saw them reach the final of the FA Trophy at Wembley Stadium, where they lost 1–0 to FC Halifax Town. After finishing sixth in the National League in 2023–24, the club were barred from competing in the play-offs after failing to meet the entry criteria for the Football League due to not obtaining a "10-year security of tenure" for their stadium. They also reached a second successive FA Trophy final, this time defeating Solihull Moors on penalties following a 2–2 draw to win the competition.

The club got into financial difficulties in 2026 after co-owner Mark Nellist withdrew funding. Salaries for players and staff were paid late, and HMRC debts remained outstanding. The side were bottom of the National League with just four points from 15 games, 13 points from safety, and manager-less (Lee Cattermole was sacked in October), when a takeover of the club by the US-based Flacks Group was announced on 6 November 2026.

Following the takeover announcement, interim chairman Graham Wood confirmed that outstanding wages for players and staff had been paid and that funds were available to settle debts owed to HM Revenue and Customs and other creditors. The acquisition remained subject to approval by the Independent Football Regulator.

== Colours and crest ==
The club initially played in all red strip with a white and blue vertical slash on the shirt. Gateshead continued to play in odd-coloured variations until the mid-1980s, when the club changed to the colours of the previous Gateshead incarnation – white shirt, black shorts and socks – and have played in these same colours ever since. Since 2011, Gateshead has adopted their original colours of claret and blue as the club's away strip.

The club's crest incorporates an image of the statue the Angel of the North.

== Stadium ==
The club have played at the Gateshead International Stadium since their establishment. The record attendance of 11,750 was set in a 1995 friendly match with Newcastle United.

The stadium planned in 2009

On 28 October 2009, Gateshead unveiled plans for a new 8,000 capacity stadium to be built in the town centre, opposite the Gateshead Civic Centre, formerly the home of North Durham Cricket & Rugby Club. However, after the failure of England's bids to host the World Cup in 2018 or 2022, the stadium, which would have acted as a training base for teams playing at nearby St James' Park, was put on hold indefinitely. In 2014, it was reported that chairman Graham Wood "no longer considers a new purpose-built football ground vital to the future of Gateshead Football Club". In December 2015, the club's new owner, Richard Bennett, announced that the club had restarted the search for a new stadium location, although he described the International Stadium as "fabulous". Despite Gateshead qualifying for the National League play-offs in 2023–24, they were excluded due to Gateshead Council failing to grant the club a ten-year security of tenure for the International Stadium, which is required for all teams that apply for EFL membership from the National League.

== Current squad ==
As of 19 November 2026

Note: Flags indicate national team as defined under FIFA eligibility rules; some limited exceptions apply. Players may hold more than one non-FIFA nationality.

No.	Pos.	Nation	Player
1	GK	ENG	Max Thompson
2	DF	ENG	Tommy Lavery
3	DF	ENG	David Ferguson
4	MF	ENG	Josh Home
5	DF	ENG	Alex Lankshear
6	DF	ENG	Jack Robinson
7	FW	ENG	Jordy Hiwula
8	MF	WAL	Sam Bowen
11	MF	ENG	Josh Anifowose
12	GK	ENG	Peter Jameson
14	FW	MSR	Ashley Boatswain
16	FW	ENG	Lucas Lowery

No.	Pos.	Nation	Player
17	MF	ENG	Rocco Coyle
18	DF	ENG	Ben Williams
19	FW	NZL	Luke Supyk
20	MF	ENG	Fenton John
21	FW	ENG	Michael Spellman
23	FW	ENG	Billy Chadwick
24	DF	SCO	Kyle Ferguson
25	MF	ENG	Alfie McCalmont
27	MF	IRL	David Eguaibor
32	MF	ENG	Harry Chapman
35	MF	ENG	Callum Bone

=== Out on loan ===
Note: Flags indicate national team as defined under FIFA eligibility rules; some limited exceptions apply. Players may hold more than one non-FIFA nationality.

No.	Pos.	Nation	Player
13	GK	ENG	Preston Leech (on loan to Whitley Bay FC)

== Non-playing staff ==
As of 19 November 2026

Coaching staff
Position	Name
Technical Director.	Paul Bracewell
Manager	Alun Armstrong
Assistant Manager	Terry Mitchell
First-Team Coach	Ben Clark
Goalkeeping Coach	Peter Jameson
Head of Football Operations	Simon Johnson
Head of Analysis	Alex Dixon
Physiotherapist	Tom Andrews

As of 12 September 2025

Non-playing staff
Position	Name
Chairman	Graham Wood
Vice-Chairman	Lawrence O'Halleron
Directors	Laurence Dinning
General Manager	Mike Coulson
Media Manager	Jack McGraghan

== Managerial history ==
Years	Manager	Ref
1977–1986	Ray Wilkie	
1986	Terry Hibbitt	
1986–1987	George Smith	
1987–1988	Dave Parnaby	
1988	Billy Bell	
1988	John Carver (caretaker)	
1988–1990	Dave Parnaby	
1990	Jim Pearson (caretaker)	
1990–1991	Tony Lee	
1991–1993	Tommy Cassidy	
1993–1997	Colin Richardson	
1997	Jim Platt	
1997–1998	John Carroll	
1998	Alan Shoulder, Gary Robson (co-caretakers)	
1998–2001	Matt Pearson	
2001–2002	Paul Proudlock	
2002	Gary Gill	
2002–2004	Derek Bell	
2004	Alan Bell	
2004–2005	Tom Wade	
2005–2006	Colin Richardson	
2006–2007	Tony Lee	
2007–2012	Ian Bogie	
2012–2013	Anth Smith	
2013	David Rush (caretaker)	
2013–2015	Gary Mills	
2015	Malcolm Crosby	
2015	Ben Clark, Micky Cummins (co-caretakers)	
2015–2017	Neil Aspin	
2017	Micky Cummins (caretaker)	
2017–2019	Steve Watson	
2019	Ben Clark	
2019–2023	Mike Williamson	
2023–2024	Rob Elliot	
2024	Ben Clark (caretaker)	
2024–2025	Carl Magnay	
2025–2026	Alun Armstrong	
2026	Rob Elliot	
2026	Lee Cattermole	
2026	Ben Clark (caretaker)	
2026–	Alun Armstrong	

== Honours ==
- FA Trophy
  - Winners 2023–24
- National League
  - National League North champions 2021–22
- Northern Premier League
  - Champions 1982–83, 1985–86
  - Challenge Shield winners 1985–86

== Records ==
- Best FA Cup performance: Third round, 2014–15
- Best FA Trophy performance: Winners, 2023–24
- Record attendance: 11,750 vs Newcastle United, friendly match, 7 August 1995
- Biggest win: 8–0 vs Netherfield, Northern Premier League
- Heaviest defeat: 9–0 vs Sutton United, Football Conference, 22 September 1990
- Most appearances: James Curtis, 596 (2003–2016)
- Most goals: Paul Thompson, 130 (1995–1997, 1999–2004, 2005–2008)
- Record transfer fee paid: £9,000 to Dagenham & Redbridge for Paul Cavell, 1994
- Record transfer fee received: £250,000 from Peterborough United for Marcus Maddison, 2014

== See also ==
- Gateshead F.C. players
- Gateshead F.C. managers
