= Kevin Danso =

Austrian footballer (born 1998)

- Danso playing for Sunderland in 2026

Personal information
- Full name: Kevin Danso
- Date of birth: 19 September 1998 (age 28)
- Place of birth: Voitsberg, Austria
- Height: 1.90 m (6 ft 3 in)
- Position: Centre-back

Team information
- Current team: Sunderland (on loan from Tottenham Hotspur)
- Number: 4

Youth career
- Reading
- –2014: Milton Keynes Dons
- 2014–2016: FC Augsburg

Senior career*
Years	Team	Apps	(Gls)
2016–2018	FC Augsburg II	5	(0)
2017–2021	FC Augsburg	41	(3)
2019–2020	→ Southampton (loan)	6	(0)
2020–2021	→ Fortuna Düsseldorf (loan)	32	(2)
2021–2025	Lens	112	(4)
2025	→ Tottenham Hotspur (loan)	10	(0)
2025–	Tottenham Hotspur	24	(0)
2026–	→ Sunderland (loan)	5	(0)

International career^{‡}
2013	Austria U15	2	(2)
2013	Austria U16	4	(0)
2015	Austria U17	7	(2)
2015–2016	Austria U18	7	(3)
2016	Austria U19	3	(1)
2018–2020	Austria U21	20	(3)
2017–	Austria	40	(0)
- * Club domestic league appearances and goals as of 16:02, 18 October 2026 (UTC) ‡ National team caps and goals as of 14 November 2026

Kevin Danso (born 19 September 1998) is an Austrian professional footballer who plays as a centre-back for Premier League club Sunderland, on loan from Tottenham Hotspur, and the Austria national team.

After playing in various English academies, Danso joined German club FC Augsburg in 2014 and made his first team debut in 2016. Following loans to Southampton and Fortuna Düsseldorf, Danso would join French Ligue 1 club RC Lens in 2021. In his second season at Lens, the club achieved their highest league finish in 21 years and Danso was named in the UNFP's Ligue 1 Team of the Season. Danso joined English Premier League club Tottenham Hotspur on loan in February 2025 where he won the 2024-25 UEFA Europa League, signing permanently for Tottenham 10 days following the final.

Danso made his debut for the Austria national team in 2017 after previously playing at youth level from under-15 to under-21, going on to represent Austria at UEFA Euro 2024 and the 2026 FIFA World Cup.

== Early life ==
Danso was born in Austria to Ghanaian parents before moving to Milton Keynes in England at the age of six.

== Club career ==
=== Early years ===
Danso joined the academy of Milton Keynes Dons at under 9 level having previously been a striker in the Reading academy, staying at the club until 2014 before moving to FC Augsburg in Germany.

=== FC Augsburg ===
On 3 March 2017, Danso made his Bundesliga debut for FC Augsburg at the age of 18 years and 165 days, becoming the youngest player to make a league appearance in the club's history. A week later, he signed a new four-year contract with the club.

==== Southampton loan ====
On 9 August 2019, the day after the Premier League transfer window closed, it was announced that Danso signed for Southampton on a one-year loan, with the option to buy at the end of the 2019–20 season.

==== Fortuna Düsseldorf loan ====
On 18 August 2020 he went to Fortuna Düsseldorf on loan. He left Fortuna upon the expiration of his contract on 24 May 2021.

=== Lens ===
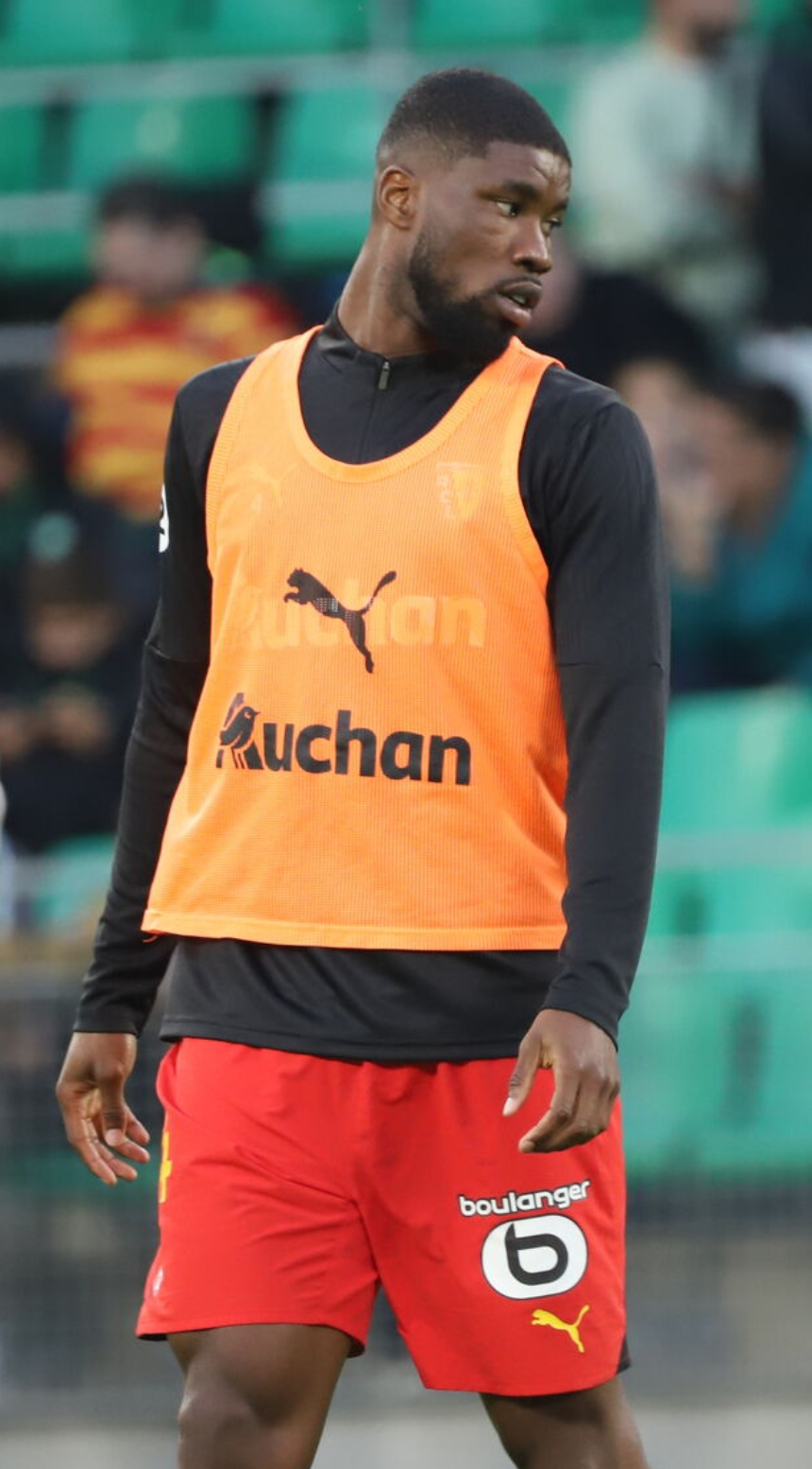
Danso warming up for Lens in 2024

On 6 August 2021, Danso joined Ligue 1 side RC Lens. On 19 March 2022, he scored his first goal with Lens against Clermont. During the 2022–23 season, he played a crucial role in helping his team secure second place in the league and qualify for the following season's Champions League.

=== Tottenham Hotspur ===
On 2 February 2025, Danso joined Premier League club Tottenham Hotspur on loan for the remainder of the season with an obligation to buy at the end of the season. He made his first appearance for Spurs on 6 February in a 4–0 defeat away to Liverpool in the EFL Cup semi-final. Danso was selected in the squad that played the 2025 UEFA Europa League final, entering the game as a substitute, and helping Tottenham to win their first trophy for seventeen years.

On 31 May 2025, Danso joined Tottenham Hotspur permanently from Lens for £21 million.

Danso started in the 2025 UEFA Super Cup, playing the full match against PSG as Tottenham lost on penalties after the match ended 2–2. Danso was used as a long throw-in specialist in the match, drawing significant media attention. As Tottenham spent the second half of the 2025-26 season in a relegation battle which came down to the final matchday, Danso became a crucial part of the team during the run-in following a season ending injury to Cristian Romero. Danso started Tottenham's last 6 matches, winning 11 points to keep the club in the Premier League.

Danso scored his first and only goal for Tottenham on the 26th August in a 5-1 victory against Charlton Athletic in the 2nd Round of the EFL Cup. Shortly afterwards, Tottenham manager Roberto De Zerbi confirmed to the media that Danso had requested to leave the club, attributed to Spurs' reduced schedule without European football along with summer centre back signings Marcos Senesi and Jan Paul van Hecke.

==== Sunderland loan ====
On 1 September 2026, Danso joined fellow Premier League club Sunderland on loan on a season-long loan. On 5 September, Danso made his debut for Sunderland in a 1-1 draw away to Brentford.

== International career ==
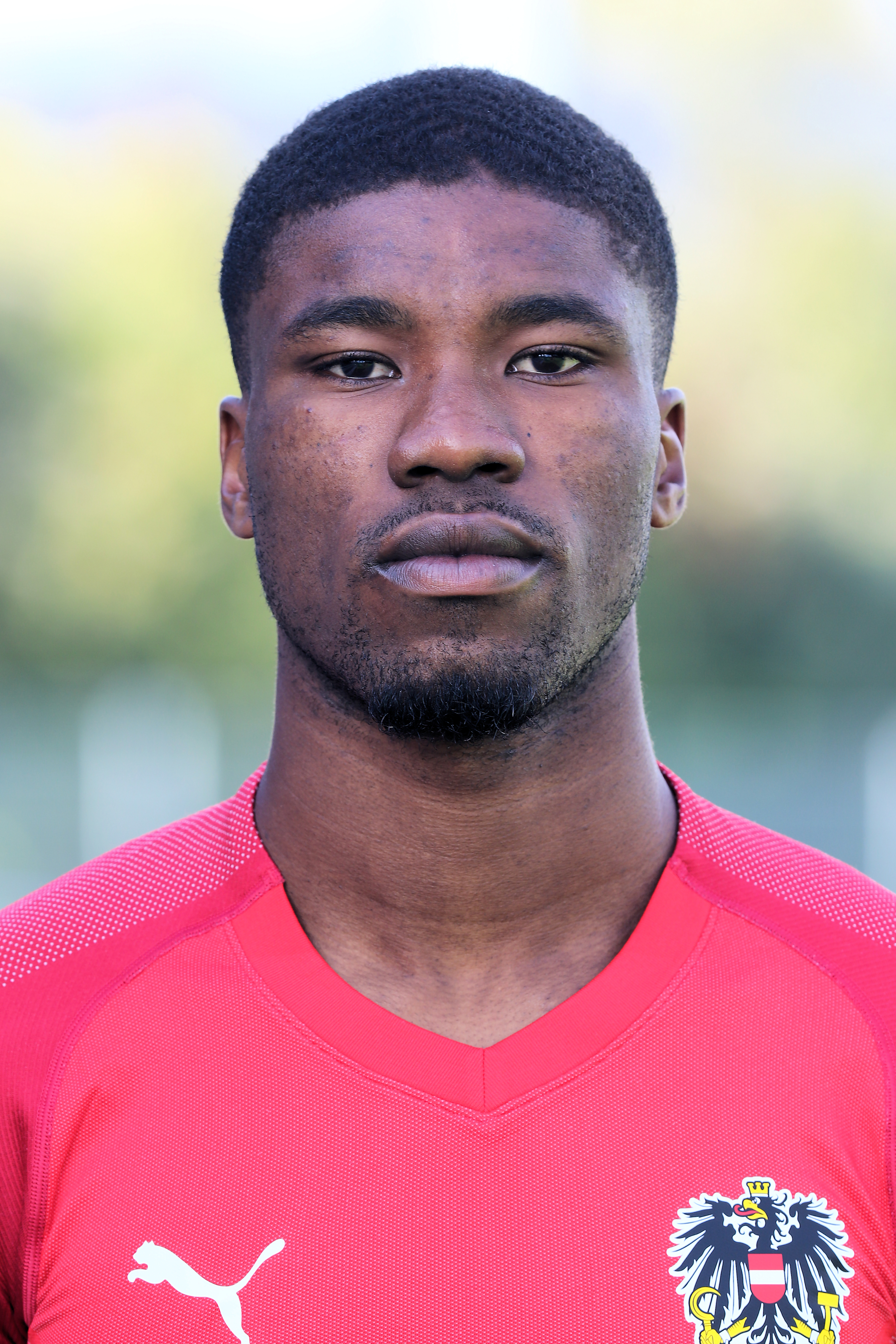
Danso with Austria U21 in 2019

Danso was eligible to represent Ghana or Austria internationally. He represented Austria's U15, U16, U17, Austria U18, and U19 youth teams.

In May 2017, he received his first call-up to the senior national team. In June 2024, he was named in the Austrian squad for UEFA Euro 2024. In the group stage, Danso started in Austria's 1–0 defeat to France and made a substitute appearance in their 3–1 win over Poland, progressing to the knockouts. In the knockout round, Danso would start in Austria's 2-1 Round of 16 defeat against Turkey

In October 2025, he was part of “Austrian football history” as he played the entire match in a 10–0 victory over San Marino, Austria's biggest win in international football.

On 18 May 2026, Danso was selected in Ralf Rangnick’s 26-man squad for the 2026 FIFA World Cup, marking Austria’s first appearance in the tournament since 1998. In the group stage, Danso would start against Argentina, and made substitute appearances against Algeria and Jordan, qualifying for the knockouts. In the knockout round, Danso would start in Austria's 3-0 Round of 32 defeat to Spain.

== Career statistics ==
=== Club ===
As of match played 28 October 2026

Appearances and goals by club, season and competition
Club	Season	League			National cup (Note: Includes DFB-Pokal, FA Cup, Coupe de France)		League cup (Note: Includes EFL Cup)		Europe		Other		Total	
Club	Season	Division	Apps	Goals	Apps	Goals	Apps	Goals	Apps	Goals	Apps	Goals	Apps	Goals
FC Augsburg II	2015–16	Regionalliga Bayern	2	0	—		—		—		2 (Note: Appearances in Regionalliga relegation play-offs)	1	4	1
FC Augsburg II	2017–18	Regionalliga Bayern	3	0	—		—		—		—		3	0
FC Augsburg II	Total		5	0	—		—		—		2	1	7	1
FC Augsburg	2016–17	Bundesliga	7	0	0	0	—		—		—		7	0
FC Augsburg	2017–18	Bundesliga	16	2	0	0	—		—		—		16	2
FC Augsburg	2018–19	Bundesliga	18	1	3	0	—		—		—		21	1
FC Augsburg	Total		41	3	3	0	—		—		—		44	3
Southampton (loan)	2019–20	Premier League	6	0	2	0	2	0	—		—		10	0
Fortuna Düsseldorf (loan)	2020–21	2. Bundesliga	32	2	1	0	—		—		—		33	2
Lens	2021–22	Ligue 1	33	2	3	0	—		—		—		36	2
Lens	2022–23	Ligue 1	37	1	1	0	—		—		—		38	1
Lens	2023–24	Ligue 1	30	1	1	0	—		7 (Note: Six appearances in UEFA Champions League, one appearance in UEFA Europa League)	0	—		38	1
Lens	2024–25	Ligue 1	12	0	1	0	—		1 (Note: Appearance(s) in UEFA Europa League)	0	—		14	0
Lens	Total		112	4	6	0	—		8	0	—		126	4
Tottenham Hotspur (loan)	2024–25	Premier League	10	0	1	0	1	0	3	0	—		15	0
Tottenham Hotspur	2025–26	Premier League	24	0	1	0	2	0	7 (Note: Appearances in UEFA Champions League)	0	1 (Note: Appearance in UEFA Super Cup)	0	35	0
Tottenham Hotspur	2026–27	Premier League	0	0	—		1	1	—		—		1	1
Tottenham Hotspur	Total		34	0	2	0	4	1	10	0	1	0	51	1
Sunderland (loan)	2026–27	Premier League	5	0	0	0	1	0	2	0	—		8	0
Career total			235	9	14	0	7	1	20	0	3	1	279	11

=== International ===
As of match played 14 November 2026

Appearances and goals by national team and year
National team	Year	Apps	Goals
Austria	2017	5	0
Austria	2018	1	0
Austria	2019	0	0
Austria	2020	0	0
Austria	2021	0	0
Austria	2022	5	0
Austria	2023	5	0
Austria	2024	8	0
Austria	2025	6	0
Austria	2026	10	0
Total		40	0

== Honours ==
Tottenham Hotspur

- UEFA Europa League: 2024–25

Individual

- UNFP Ligue 1 Team of the Year: 2022–23
