= Callum Olusesi =

English association football player (born 2007)

Personal information
- Full name: Callum William Olusesi
- Date of birth: 11 March 2007 (age 19)
- Place of birth: Lambeth, England
- Height: 1.75 m (5 ft 9 in)
- Position: Midfielder

Team information
- Current team: Tottenham Hotspur
- Number: 64

Youth career
- –2025: Tottenham Hotspur

Senior career*
Years	Team	Apps	(Gls)
2025–	Tottenham Hotspur	1	(0)

International career^{‡}
2022–2023	England U16	6	(1)
2023–2024	England U17	11	(2)
2024	England U18	4	(2)
2025–	England U19	5	(0)
2026–	England U20	1	(0)
- * Club domestic league appearances and goals as of 20:14, 15 March 2026 (UTC) ‡ National team caps and goals as of 23:37, 31 March 2026 (UTC)

Callum William Olusesi (born 11 March 2007) is an English professional footballer who plays as a midfielder for Premier League side Tottenham Hotspur.

== Club career ==
Olusesi was a member of Tottenham Hotspur's U17 and U18 Premier League Cup double-winning side as a youth academy player. He made a number of appearances for Spurs U18 as a 16 year-old and was one of two players, including Mikey Moore, name checked by Spurs U16 coach Yaya Touré as potential stars of the future. In May 2023, Olusesi agreed terms to start the 2023–24 season as a first-year scholar at Spurs, before going professional on his seventeenth birthday with the terms keeping him at the club until at least 30 June 2026.

Olusesi became a member of Spurs first team match-day squads during the 2024-25 season. He made his professional debut for Spurs as a second-half substitute away against Hoffenheim in the UEFA Europa League on 23 January 2025. On 2 April 2025, Olusesi signed a new contract running until 2029. He captained Spurs in the UEFA Youth League in the 2025-26 season. Coming on as a substitute, Olusesi made his Premier League debut on 15 March 2026, coming on for Djed Spence in the 76th minute, in a 1–1 draw against Liverpool at Anfield.

== International career ==
In November 2023, Olusesi made his competitive debut for England U17 in a qualifying match against Faroe Islands and in their next qualifier he scored twice in a victory over Kosovo. Olusesi was included in the England squad for the 2024 UEFA European Under-17 Championship and played in all four of their games at the tournament including the quarter-final elimination against Italy.

Having played for the England U18s, Olusesi made his England U19 debut as a substitute during a 2–0 win over Ukraine at Pinatar Arena on 3 September 2025.

On 27 March 2026, Olusesi made his England U20 debut during a 3-3 draw away to Italy.

== Personal life ==
Born in London, Olusesi is of Nigerian descent.

== Career statistics ==
=== Club ===
As of match played 18 March 2026

Appearances and goals by club, season and competition
Club	Season	League			National cup		League cup		Europe		Other		Total	
Club	Season	Division	Apps	Goals	Apps	Goals	Apps	Goals	Apps	Goals	Apps	Goals	Apps	Goals
Tottenham Hotspur U21	2024–25	—			—		—		—		2 (Note: Appearances in EFL Trophy)	0	2	0
Tottenham Hotspur U21	2025–26	—			—		—		—		2	0	2	0
Tottenham Hotspur U21	Total		—		—		—		—		4	0	4	0
Tottenham Hotspur	2024–25	Premier League	0	0	0	0	0	0	1 (Note: Appearance in UEFA Europa League)	0	—		1	0
Tottenham Hotspur	2025–26	Premier League	1	0	0	0	0	0	1 (Note: Appearance in UEFA Champions League)	0	0	0	2	0
Tottenham Hotspur	Total		1	0	0	0	0	0	2	0	0	0	3	0
Career total			1	0	0	0	0	0	2	0	4	0	7	0

== Honours ==
Tottenham Hotspur

- UEFA Europa League: 2024–25
