= Djed Spence =

English footballer (born 2000)

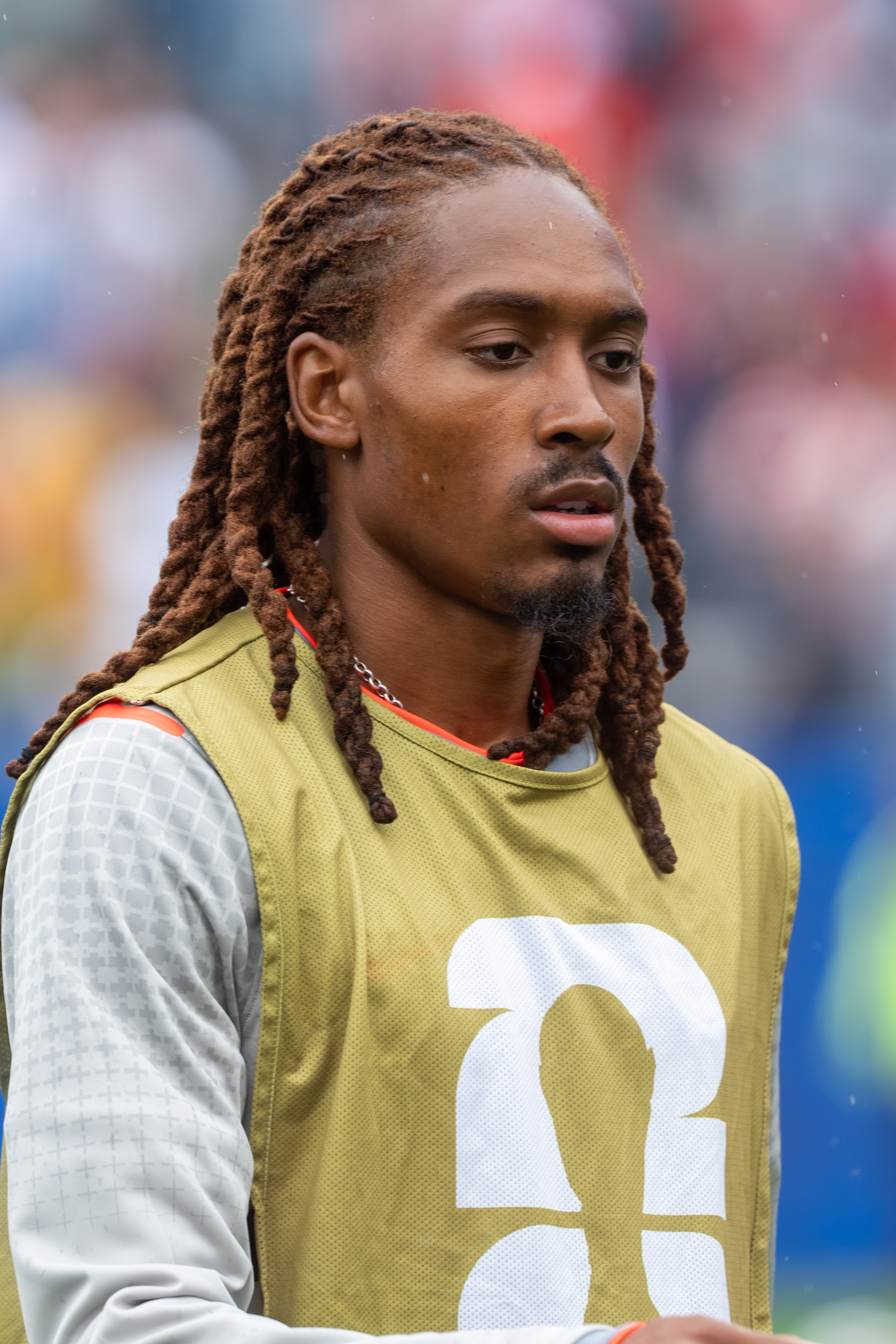
- Spence with England in 2026

Personal information
- Full name: Diop Tehuti Djed-Hotep Spence
- Date of birth: 9 August 2000 (age 26)
- Place of birth: Kensington, England
- Height: 6 ft 1 in (1.85 m)
- Positions: Full-back; wing-back

Team information
- Current team: Inter Milan
- Number: 99

Youth career
- 2008–2014: Peckham Town
- 2014–2016: Junior Elite
- 2016–2018: Fulham

Senior career*
Years	Team	Apps	(Gls)
2018–2022	Middlesbrough	63	(2)
2021–2022	→ Nottingham Forest (loan)	39	(2)
2022–2026	Tottenham Hotspur	59	(1)
2022–2023	→ Rennes (loan)	8	(0)
2023–2024	→ Leeds United (loan)	7	(0)
2024	→ Genoa (loan)	16	(0)
2026–	Inter Milan	5	(0)

International career^{‡}
2022–2023	England U21	6	(0)
2025–	England	15	(0)
Medal record
Men's football
Representing England
FIFA World Cup
Third place	2026 Canada–Mexico–US
- * Club domestic league appearances and goals as of 23:38, 22 November 2026 (UTC) ‡ National team caps and goals as of 22:00, 15 November 2026 (UTC)

Diop Tehuti Djed-Hotep Spence (born 9 August 2000) is an English professional footballer who plays as a full-back for Serie A club Inter Milan and the England national team.

== Early life ==
Spence was born in London as Diop Tehuti Djed-Hotep Spence. He is the younger brother of actress Karla-Simone Spence. He is of Jamaican descent. During his childhood, Spence played for Peckham Town and Junior Elite at grassroots level.

== Club career ==
=== Middlesbrough ===
Spence signed for Middlesbrough on 1 July 2018, having previously been with Fulham's academy. He made his debut for Middlesbrough in the EFL Cup on 14 August 2018, appearing as a substitute versus Notts County at the Riverside Stadium. Spence made his league debut for Middlesbrough in a 1–0 win over Charlton Athletic on 7 December 2019, scoring his first league goal in a 1–0 win against Huddersfield Town on 26 December 2019.

On 11 January 2020, Spence won the EFL Young Player of the Month following his league debut, first goal, and three clean sheets.

==== Nottingham Forest (loan) ====
On 1 September 2021, it was announced Spence would join Nottingham Forest on loan for the remainder of the season. He scored his first goal for Forest in a 3–0 win over Birmingham City on 2 October. Spence impressed in FA Cup victories over Premier League clubs Arsenal and Leicester City, scoring the fourth in a 4–1 victory over the latter.

Spence was awarded the EFL Championship Player of the Month award for March 2022 as well as being nominated for the Goal of the Month award following his long range strike against Queens Park Rangers which he was ultimately awarded. Having also been nominated for the Championship Young Player of the Season, Spence made it a hat-trick of awards for March 2022 when he won the EFL Young Player of the Month award for the second time in his career, becoming the first player to win it twice in the process.

Spence played a vital role in Nottingham Forest's promotion winning side, and was featured in both the EFL Championship Team of the Season and the PFA Championship team of the season.

=== Tottenham Hotspur ===
On 19 July 2022, Tottenham Hotspur announced the signing of Spence on a five-year contract, for a reported fee of £20 million. Manager Antonio Conte swiftly disowned the signing, describing Spence as "an investment by the club". Spence later revealed that this "shattered [his] confidence".

Ahead of Tottenham's game against Nottingham Forest on 29 August, Conte praised Spence for his efforts in training; he rewarded him with his Tottenham and Premier League debut, bringing him on as a late substitute in a 2–0 win. Further appearances were limited, however: Spence had made just six by the end of January.

==== Loan to Rennes ====
On 31 January 2023, Spence joined Ligue 1 side Stade Rennais on a loan until the end of the 2022–23 season. He made ten appearances for Rennes, including nine starts, one of which was a 2–0 win over Paris Saint-Germain at the Parc des Princes, the Parisian team's first league defeat at home in 23 months.

Spence's minutes became limited after Rennes captain Hamari Traore returned from injury in April, and the loan was cut short by a knee injury which saw Spence return to England for treatment.

==== Loan to Leeds United ====
On 30 August 2023, EFL Championship club Leeds United announced the signing of Spence on a season-long loan from Tottenham Hotspur. He made his debut for the club in a Championship fixture against Sheffield Wednesday on 2 September, coming on as a second-half substitute in a 0–0 draw.

On 18 September 2023, Spence suffered a knee ligament injury in training that would see him out of action for until December. He made his comeback from injury on 9 December, playing 20 minutes against Blackburn Rovers and went on to start Leeds' next five Championship fixtures.

On 4 January 2024, Leeds triggered a break clause to terminate Spence's loan spell, seeing him return to Tottenham Hotspur. Leeds manager Daniel Farke said the decision was made due to concerns about Spence's attitude.

==== Loan to Genoa ====
On 11 January 2024, Spence signed for Serie A club Genoa on a loan deal until the end of the season. He made 16 Serie A appearances for the Rossoblù in the second half of the season. However, the club was unable to meet the option to buy fee of £8.5m at the end of his loan spell and he returned to Tottenham Hotspur.

==== Return to Tottenham Hotspur ====
Ahead of the 2024–25 season, Spence was omitted from Tottenham's Europa League squad. He was, however, registered for domestic competitions.

On 19 August 2024, Spence made his first appearance for Tottenham since January 2023 in their opening fixture of the 2024–25 season, replacing Pedro Porro as a substitute in a 1–1 draw with Leicester City in the Premier League. He scored his first competitive goal for the club in a 2–1 EFL Cup win over Coventry City on 17 September. His first start for Tottenham came on 15 December 2024 (881 days after signing for the club) in a 5–0 win against Southampton.

Following long-term injuries to defenders Micky van de Ven, Cristian Romero, and Destiny Udogie, Djed Spence received an extended run in the Tottenham Hotspur starting lineup from December 2024 to February 2025. Spence was named Player of the Match for his performance in Tottenham's 1–0 win over Manchester United on 16 February 2025. On 22 February 2025, Spence scored his first Premier League goal in a 4–1 win over Ipswich Town. He was selected in the squad that played the 2025 UEFA Europa League final, entering the game as a substitute, and helping Tottenham to win their first trophy for seventeen years.

On 18 August 2025, Tottenham announced that Spence had signed a new long-term contract with the club.

=== Inter Milan ===
On 15 August 2026, Spence joined Serie A side Inter Milan for a reported fee of €31.5 million plus bonuses, signing a five-year contract.

== International career ==
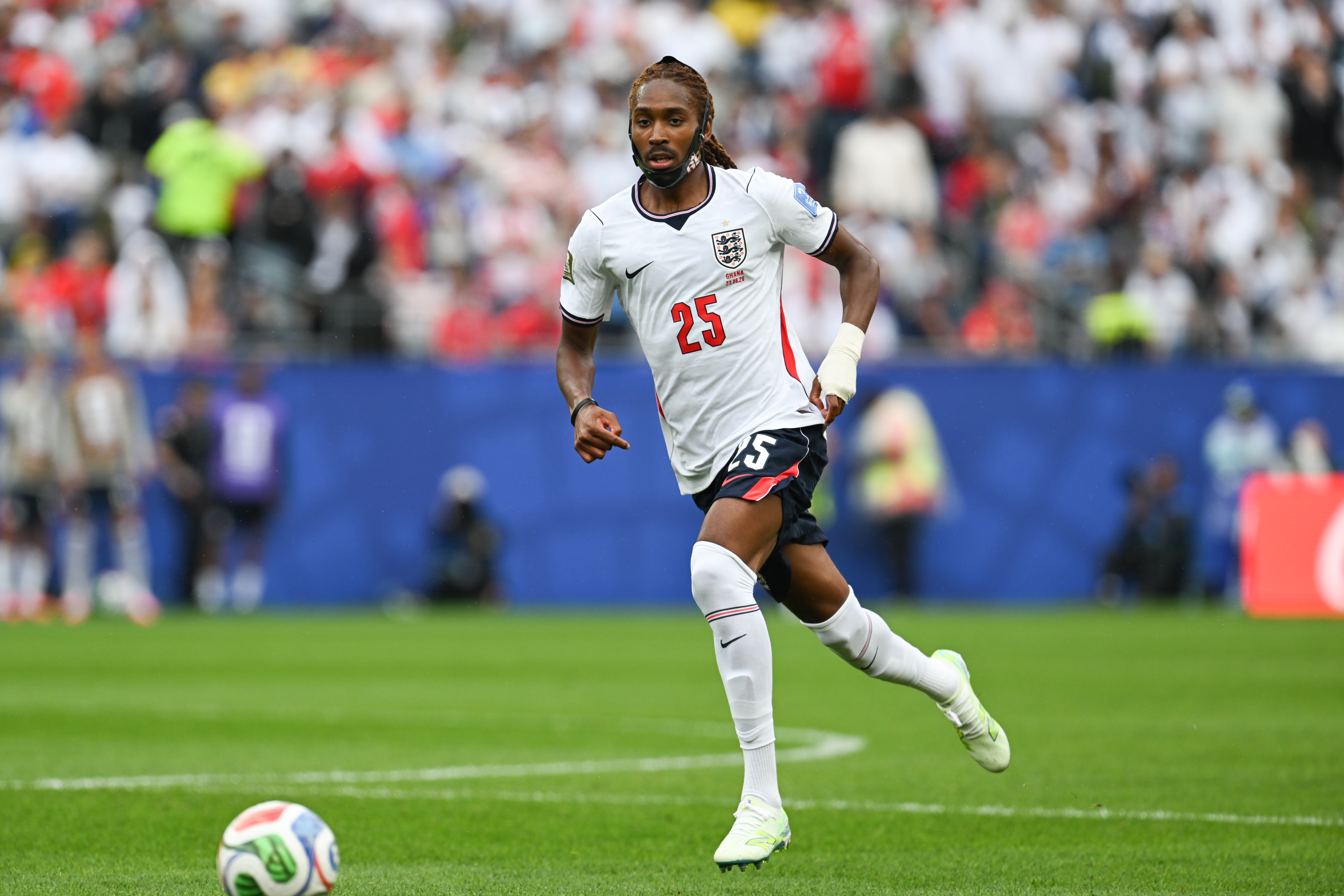
Spence with England at the 2026 FIFA World Cup

In March 2022, Spence earned a first international call up to the England Under-21 squad for the European Championship Qualifying matches against Andorra and Albania. He made his debut as a substitute during a 3–0 victory away to the latter on 29 March 2022.

Spence was called up to the senior England squad for the first time on 29 August 2025. On 9 September 2025, Spence made his debut for the English senior squad in a 5–0 victory against Serbia in the 2026 FIFA World Cup qualifiers, replacing Reece James in the 69th minute.

=== 2026 FIFA World Cup ===
On 22 May 2026, Spence was selected in the 26-man squad for the 2026 FIFA World Cup. He made his World Cup debut as a substitute in England's 4–2 opening group match win over Croatia on 17 June. He then started at left back in the following match against Ghana on 23 June, playing 66 minutes before being substituted for Nico O'Reilly. After making another substitute appearance in the 2–0 win over Panama in the team's final group match, Spence started at right back in the round of 32 match against the Democratic Republic of the Congo on 1 July, playing 70 minutes. He went on to appear as a substitute in both the 3–2 win over Mexico in the round of 16 and the 2–1 win over Norway in the quarter-final. During most of the tournament, he wore a custom protective jaw brace after sustaining an injury from a hit by Liam Delap in a Premier League match against Chelsea prior to the World Cup. He removed the brace midway through the quarter-final match and did not wear it for the remainder of the tournament. Spence also played in the third-place match against France. He would draw a foul which led to a penalty kick as England defeated France 6-4 and secured third place.

== Style of play ==
Spence primarily plays as a right-back, and is known for his pace and dribbling ability. He has been praised by Ian Wright, who described him as "combative, technical, swashbuckling", and Wes Morgan, who compared him to a Rolls-Royce.

== Personal life ==
Spence is a convert to Islam and the first Muslim player to represent the senior England men's national football team.

== Career statistics ==
=== Club ===
As of match played 22 November 2026

Appearances and goals by club, season and competition
Club	Season	League			National cup (Note: Includes FA Cup)		League cup (Note: Includes EFL Cup)		Europe		Other		Total	
Club	Season	Division	Apps	Goals	Apps	Goals	Apps	Goals	Apps	Goals	Apps	Goals	Apps	Goals
Fulham U23	2017–18	—			—		—		—		1 (Note: Appearance(s) in EFL Trophy)	0	1	0
Middlesbrough	2018–19	Championship	0	0	0	0	2	0	—		—		2	0
Middlesbrough	2019–20	Championship	22	1	2	0	0	0	—		—		24	1
Middlesbrough	2020–21	Championship	38	1	1	0	1	0	—		—		40	1
Middlesbrough	2021–22	Championship	3	0	—		1	0	—		—		4	0
Middlesbrough	Total		63	2	3	0	4	0	—		—		70	2
Middlesbrough U23	2018–19	—			—		—		—		3	0	3	0
Nottingham Forest (loan)	2021–22	Championship	39	2	4	1	—		—		3 (Note: Appearances in Championship play-offs)	0	46	3
Tottenham Hotspur	2022–23	Premier League	4	0	1	0	1	0	0	0	—		6	0
Tottenham Hotspur	2024–25	Premier League	25	1	2	0	4	1	4 (Note: Appearances in UEFA Europa League)	0	—		35	2
Tottenham Hotspur	2025–26	Premier League	30	0	1	0	2	0	10 (Note: Appearances in UEFA Champions League)	0	1 (Note: Appearance in UEFA Super Cup)	0	44	0
Tottenham Hotspur	Total		59	1	4	0	7	1	14	0	1	0	85	2
Rennes (loan)	2022–23	Ligue 1	8	0	—		—		2	0	—		10	0
Leeds United (loan)	2023–24	Championship	7	0	0	0	—		—		—		7	0
Genoa (loan)	2023–24	Serie A	16	0	—		—		—		—		16	0
Inter Milan	2026–27	Serie A	5	0	0	0	—		3	0	0	0	8	0
Career total			197	5	11	1	11	1	19	0	8	0	246	7

=== International ===
As of match played 15 November 2026

Appearances and goals by national team and year
National team	Year	Apps	Goals
England
England	2025	3	0
England	2026	12	0
Total		15	0

== Honours ==
Nottingham Forest

- EFL Championship play-offs: 2022

Tottenham Hotspur

- UEFA Europa League: 2024–25

England

- FIFA World Cup third place: 2026

Individual

- EFL Young Player of the Month: December 2019, March 2022
- EFL Championship Player of the Month: March 2022
- EFL Championship Goal of the Month: March 2022
- EFL Championship Team of the Season: 2021–22
- PFA Team of the Year: 2021–22 Championship
