= Micky van de Ven =

Dutch footballer (born 2001)

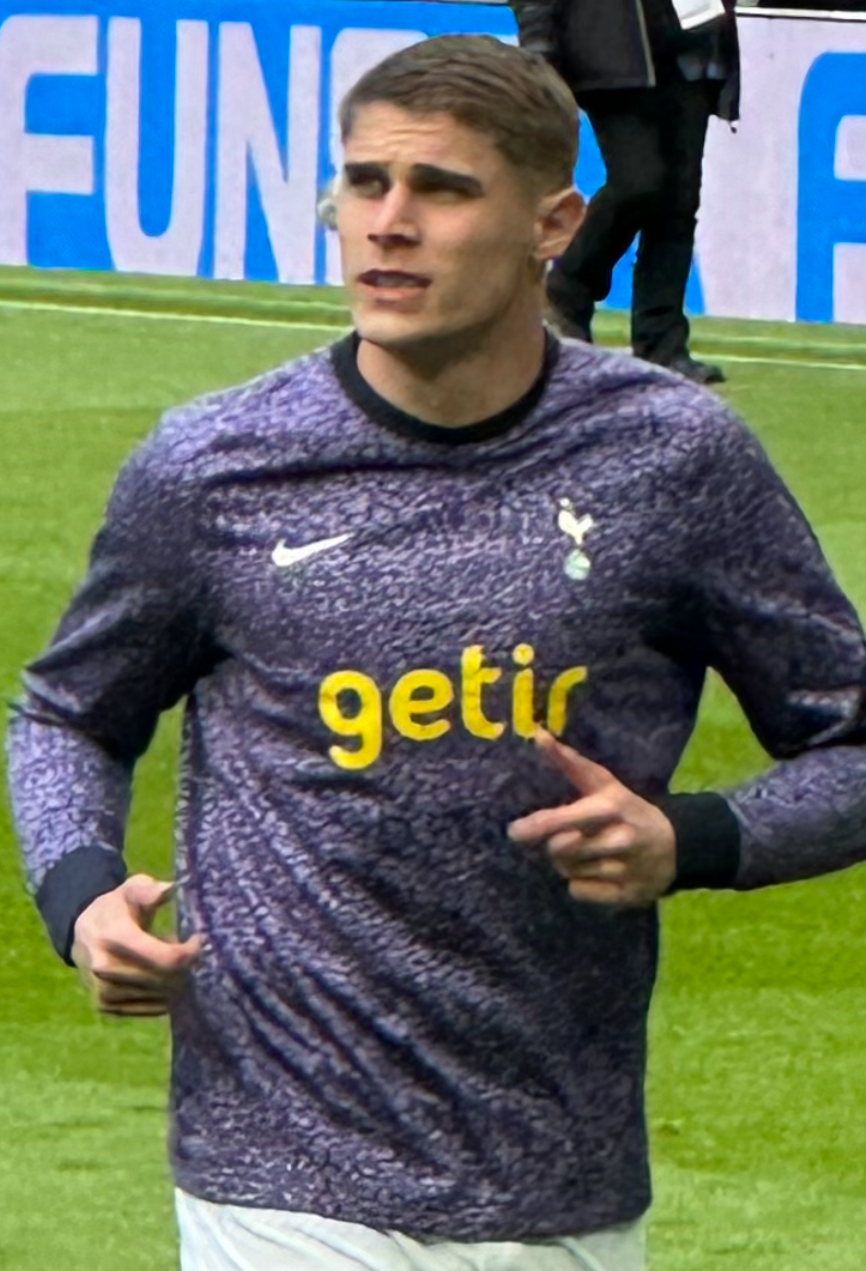
- Van de Ven warming up with Tottenham Hotspur in 2024

Personal information
- Full name: Micky van de Ven
- Date of birth: 19 April 2001 (age 25)
- Place of birth: Wormer, Netherlands
- Height: 1.93 m (6 ft 4 in)
- Positions: Centre-back; left-back

Team information
- Current team: Tottenham Hotspur
- Number: 37

Youth career
- 2011–2013: WSV '30
- 2013–2019: Volendam

Senior career*
| Years | Team | Apps | (Gls) |
| 2019–2021 | Volendam | 45 | (2) |
| 2021–2023 | VfL Wolfsburg | 38 | (1) |
| 2023– | Tottenham Hotspur | 84 | (7) |

International career^{‡}
| 2022–2023 | Netherlands U21 | 11 | (0) |
| 2023– | Netherlands | 30 | (1) |
Medal record
Men's football
Representing Netherlands
UEFA European Championship
| Bronze medal – third place | 2024 Germany | Team |
- * Club domestic league appearances and goals as of 23:00, 7 November 2026 (UTC) ‡ National team caps and goals as of 21:55, 16 November 2026 (UTC)

Micky van de Ven (Dutch: [ˈmɪki vɑn də ˈvɛn]; born 19 April 2001) is a Dutch professional footballer who plays either as a centre-back or left-back for Premier League club Tottenham Hotspur, which he captains, and the Netherlands national team. Known for his ball-playing abilities and physicality, he is also one of the fastest players in the world.

== Club career ==
=== Early career ===
Van de Ven began his career with Volendam, and made his first team debut against Jong PSV in the Eerste Divisie, going on to make 19 appearances during the 2019–20 season. He assumed the captaincy during his first full season and scored twice in 26 appearances as Volendam reached the promotion play-offs.

Van de Ven transferred to German club VfL Wolfsburg in 2021 for a fee of £3.15 million and played all but one of the team's Bundesliga matches during the 2022–23 season, scoring his only goal in a 2–0 win against Borussia Dortmund. Van de Ven recorded the highest top speed of any defender in the Bundesliga that season, at 22.3 miles per hour (35.9 km/h).

=== Tottenham Hotspur ===
==== 2023–24 ====
On 8 August 2023, it was announced that van de Ven had signed a six-year deal with Premier League club Tottenham Hotspur. The transfer cost an initial fee of £34.5 million and a potential total fee of £43 million, equalling the club's record fee for a centre-back in Cristian Romero the year before.

Van de Ven debuted on 13 August during the first matchday of the 2023–24 Premier League season, starting in an away match against Brentford. On 7 October 2023, he scored his first goal in English football in Tottenham's 1–0 win at Kenilworth Road against Luton Town.

On 6 November 2023, van de Ven was substituted with a hamstring injury during a game against Chelsea. He returned from injury in a 2–2 draw with Manchester United on 14 January 2024. Later that month, during a match against Brentford on 31 January, he was recorded as the Premier League's fastest ever player at 37.38 kilometres per hour (23.23 mph) since data collection began in 2020–21.

On 10 May 2024, van de Ven was awarded Tottenham's Player of the Season award at the Official Supporters' Clubs award night ceremony, having started 28 of the club's 38 games up until that point.

==== 2024–25 ====
Van de Ven suffered several injuries during the 2024–25 Premier League season. On 30 October 2024, during a EFL Cup match against Manchester City, he was injured and would not return until 8 December in a match against Chelsea, playing 79 minutes before being substituted. His next appearance for the club would not come until 30 January 2025, with a 45-minute appearance in the UEFA Europa League against IF Elfsborg. Despite his injury-hampered season, van de Ven was again recorded as the Premier League's fastest player, with a top speed of 37.1 kilometres per hour (23.1 mph).

Van de Ven started the 2025 UEFA Europa League final and delivered a crucial goal line clearance to help secure a 1–0 victory over Manchester United, securing his first major career honour and Tottenham Hotspur's first trophy in 17 years.

==== 2025–present ====
Van de Ven captained Spurs for the first time on 30 September 2025, in a 2–2 draw away against Bodø/Glimt in the UEFA Champions League; he scored Tottenham's first goal of the night. On 4 November, van de Ven made a box-to-box solo run to score the third goal in a 4–0 win over Copenhagen in the Champions League.

On 10 August 2026, van de Ven signed a new contract with Spurs. Later that month, on 21 August, he was announced by coach Roberto De Zerbi as captain of the club, succeeding Cristian Romero.

== International career ==
In October 2022, Van de Ven was included in the preliminary Netherlands squad for the 2022 FIFA World Cup. He captained the under-21 team at the Under-21 Euro 2023.

In August 2023, he received his first official call-up to the Netherlands senior national team by head coach Ronald Koeman, for two UEFA Euro 2024 qualifying matches against Greece and the Republic of Ireland.

On 13 October 2023, Van de Ven debuted for the Dutch senior squad in a UEFA Euro 2024 qualifying match against France, replacing Nathan Aké in the 80th minute.

On 29 May 2024, Van de Ven was named in the Netherlands' squad for UEFA Euro 2024.

He scored his first goal for the Netherlands on 10 June 2025 during an 8–0 win against Malta in 2026 FIFA World Cup qualification.

On 27 May 2026, he was named in the Netherlands squad for the 2026 FIFA World Cup.

== Career statistics ==
=== Club ===
As of match played 7 November 2026

Appearances and goals by club, season and competition
| Club | Season | League | | | National cup (Note: Includes KNVB Cup, DFB-Pokal, FA Cup) | | League cup (Note: Includes EFL Cup) | | Europe | | Other | | Total | |
| Club | Season | Division | Apps | Goals | Apps | Goals | Apps | Goals | Apps | Goals | Apps | Goals | Apps | Goals |
|---|---|---|---|---|---|---|---|---|---|---|---|---|---|---|
| Volendam II | 2019–20 | Tweede Divisie | 6 | 1 | — | | — | | — | | — | | 6 | 1 |
| Volendam | 2019–20 | Eerste Divisie | 19 | 0 | 1 | 0 | — | | — | | — | | 20 | 0 |
| Volendam | 2020–21 | Eerste Divisie | 26 | 2 | 1 | 0 | — | | — | | 1 (Note: Appearance in Eerste Divisie promotion play-offs) | 0 | 28 | 2 |
| Volendam | Total | | 45 | 2 | 2 | 0 | — | | — | | 1 | 0 | 48 | 2 |
| VfL Wolfsburg | 2021–22 | Bundesliga | 5 | 0 | — | | — | | 0 | 0 | — | | 5 | 0 |
| VfL Wolfsburg | 2022–23 | Bundesliga | 33 | 1 | 3 | 0 | — | | — | | — | | 36 | 1 |
| VfL Wolfsburg | Total | | 38 | 1 | 3 | 0 | — | | 0 | 0 | — | | 41 | 1 |
| Tottenham Hotspur | 2023–24 | Premier League | 27 | 3 | 1 | 0 | 1 | 0 | — | | — | | 29 | 3 |
| Tottenham Hotspur | 2024–25 | Premier League | 13 | 0 | 0 | 0 | 1 | 0 | 8 (Note: Appearances in UEFA Europa League) | 0 | — | | 22 | 0 |
| Tottenham Hotspur | 2025–26 | Premier League | 35 | 4 | 1 | 0 | 0 | 0 | 8 (Note: Appearances in UEFA Champions League) | 2 | 1 (Note: Appearance in UEFA Super Cup) | 1 | 45 | 7 |
| Tottenham Hotspur | 2026–27 | Premier League | 9 | 0 | 0 | 0 | 1 | 0 | — | | — | | 10 | 0 |
| Tottenham Hotspur | Total | | 84 | 7 | 2 | 0 | 3 | 0 | 16 | 2 | 1 | 1 | 106 | 10 |
| Career total | | | 173 | 11 | 7 | 0 | 3 | 0 | 16 | 2 | 2 | 1 | 201 | 14 |

=== International ===
As of match played 16 November 2026

Appearances and goals by national team and year
| National team | Year | Apps | Goals |
|---|---|---|---|
| Netherlands | 2023 | 2 | 0 |
| Netherlands | 2024 | 8 | 0 |
| Netherlands | 2025 | 7 | 1 |
| Netherlands | 2026 | 13 | 0 |
| Total | | 30 | 1 |

As of match played 10 June 2025
Netherlands score listed first, score column indicates score after each Van de Ven goal.

List of international goals scored by Micky van de Ven
| No. | Date | Venue | Cap | Opponent | Score | Result | Competition | Ref. |
|---|---|---|---|---|---|---|---|---|
| 1 | 10 June 2025 | Euroborg, Groningen, Netherlands | 12 | Malta | 8–0 | 8–0 | 2026 FIFA World Cup qualification | |

== Honours ==
Tottenham Hotspur

- UEFA Europa League: 2024–25
