= Jun'ai Byfield =

English footballer (born 2008)

Personal information
- Full name: Jun'ai De'Andre Ashlee Byfield
- Date of birth: 6 December 2008 (age 17)
- Place of birth: London, England
- Height: 1.85 m (6 ft 1 in)
- Position: Defender

Team information
- Current team: Tottenham Hotspur
- Number: 67

Youth career
- Tottenham Hotspur

Senior career*
Years	Team	Apps	(Gls)
2025–	Tottenham Hotspur	1	(0)

International career^{‡}
2023–2024	England U16	4	(0)
2024–	England U17	13	(0)
2025–	England U18	5	(1)
- * Club domestic league appearances and goals as of 18:56, 1 February 2026 (UTC) ‡ National team caps and goals as of 12 October 2025

Jun'ai De'Andre Ashlee Byfield (born 6 December 2008) is an English professional footballer who plays as a defender for Premier League club Tottenham Hotspur.

== Club career ==
Byfield joined the youth system of Premier League side Tottenham Hotspur at age 8, and later played in the UEFA Youth League. He first featured in the club's first-team squad when he was an unused substitute in the 2025 UEFA Super Cup on 13 August 2025. On 10 December 2025, Byfield signed his first professional contract with Tottenham Hotspur.

On 20 January 2026, Byfield made his first team debut for Tottenham as a 62nd-minute substitute in Spurs' 2-0 UEFA Champions League win over Borussia Dortmund in place of the injured Lucas Bergvall, becoming the youngest player to represent Spurs in the Champions League at 17 years and 45 days old. On 1 February, Byfield made his Premier League debut in Spurs' 2–2 home draw against Manchester City, coming on in the 90th minute in place of Dominic Solanke.

== International career ==
Byfield is an England youth international and captained England under-17. During May 2025, he represented England U17 at the 2025 UEFA European Under-17 Championship, starting in their opening game against Belgium and subsequent loss to Italy as England were eliminated at the group stage. Later that year, Byfield was selected for the 2025 FIFA U-17 World Cup but withdrew before the tournament due to injury.

== Style of play ==
Byfield plays as a defender. English newspaper Evening Standard wrote in 2024 that he is "a tall and powerful centre-back... who is comfortable in possession".

== Career statistics ==
=== Club ===
As of match played 1 February 2026

Appearances and goals by club, season and competition
Club	Season	League			National cup		League cup		Europe		Other		Total	
Club	Season	Division	Apps	Goals	Apps	Goals	Apps	Goals	Apps	Goals	Apps	Goals	Apps	Goals
Tottenham Hotspur	2025–26	Premier League	1	0	0	0	0	0	2 (Note: Appearances in UEFA Champions League)	0	0	0	3	0
Career total			1	0	0	0	0	0	2	0	0	0	3	0
