= Archie Gray =

English footballer (born 2006)

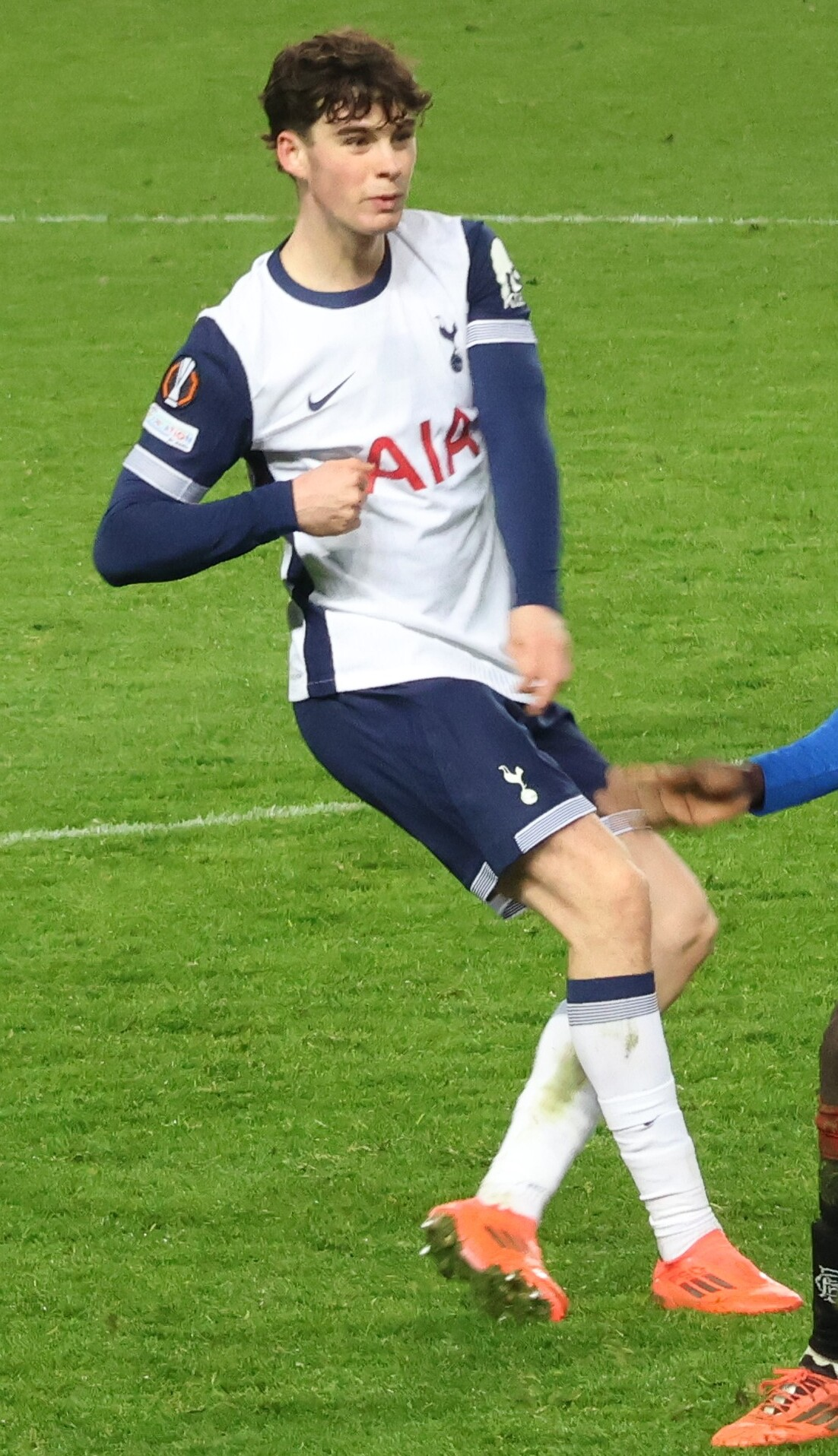
- Gray playing for Tottenham Hotspur in 2024

Personal information
- Full name: Archie James Francis Gray
- Date of birth: 12 March 2006 (age 20)
- Place of birth: Durham, England
- Height: 6 ft 2 in (1.87 m)
- Positions: Midfielder; full-back; centre-back

Team information
- Current team: Tottenham Hotspur
- Number: 14

Youth career
- 2014–2022: Leeds United

Senior career*
| Years | Team | Apps | (Gls) |
| 2023–2024 | Leeds United | 44 | (0) |
| 2024– | Tottenham Hotspur | 62 | (3) |

International career^{‡}
| 2021 | England U15 | 1 | (0) |
| 2021–2022 | England U16 | 8 | (0) |
| 2022–2023 | England U17 | 9 | (1) |
| 2022–2023 | England U19 | 3 | (0) |
| 2023– | England U20 | 1 | (0) |
| 2024– | England U21 | 17 | (2) |
Medal record
Men's football
Representing England
UEFA European Under-21 Championship
| Winner | 2025 Slovakia |
- * Club domestic league appearances and goals as of 23:25, 21 November 2026 (UTC) ‡ National team caps and goals as of 23:56, 31 March 2026 (UTC)

Archie James Francis Gray (born 12 March 2006) is an English professional footballer who plays as a midfielder or defender for Premier League club Tottenham Hotspur.

== Club career ==
=== Leeds United ===
Born in Durham, Gray joined Leeds United at under-9 level. He progressed rapidly through the academy, and an agreement had to be met between Leeds United and Gray's school, the St John Fisher Catholic High School in Harrogate, for Gray to miss classes in order to train with the first team, at the request of then-manager Marcelo Bielsa.

On 18 December 2021, aged 15, Gray was named on the bench for a Premier League game against Arsenal. Had he featured, he would have broken the record for Leeds United's youngest player, set in 1962 by Peter Lorimer. He made the bench a further five times in the 2021–22 season, but did not feature.

Gray signed a two-year scholarship deal with Leeds United in September 2022.

On 6 August 2023, Gray made his Leeds United and senior debut in the opening game of the 2023–24 EFL Championship season against Cardiff City at Elland Road. Gray appeared 52 times in all competitions as Leeds lost in the playoff final to Southampton. In April 2024, he was awarded the EFL Championship Young Player of the Season.

=== Tottenham Hotspur ===
==== 2024–25 ====
On 2 July 2024, Gray signed for Premier League club Tottenham Hotspur, for an undisclosed fee, reported to be around £40m. On 19 August, he made his debut for the club, as a substitute, in a 1–1 draw against Leicester City in the league. Gray's first start for the club, wearing the shirt number 14, came in a 2–1 EFL Cup win against Coventry City on 18 September 2024.

Throughout the 2024–25 Premier League season, Gray was frequently used as a centre-back due to an ongoing injury crisis at Tottenham; manager Ange Postecoglou praised him for his courage in taking on the challenge of playing out of position. Gray's first start in his favoured central midfield position did not come until 16 March 2025. He was selected in the squad that played the 2025 UEFA Europa League final, entering the game as a substitute, and helping Tottenham to win their first trophy for seventeen years.

==== 2025–26 ====
Gray continued to develop throughout the 2025–26 Premier League season, playing 35 games for Spurs. Gray won all three annual Player of the Season awards presented by Tottenham Hotspur this season. On 28 December 2025, he scored his first senior goal in a 1–0 win over Crystal Palace.

==== 2026–27 ====
Ahead of the 2026–27 Premier League season, Gray was named by manager Roberto De Zerbi as one of Tottenham's five captains. On 22 August 2026, Gray captained Tottenham in their opening day defeat to Brentford. In doing so, he became Tottenham's youngest ever captain, replacing a 54-year-old record previously held by Steve Perryman.

Gray scored his first goal of the season on 31 October 2026, the opener in a 2–0 win against Crystal Palace.

== International career ==
Gray has represented England at under-16 level through to under-21 level. He remains eligible to represent Scotland.

On 17 May 2023, Gray was named in the England squad for the 2023 UEFA European Under-17 Championship.

Having already stepped up to the England U19 squad, Gray made his U20 debut on 16 November 2023 during a 3–0 defeat to Italy at the Eco-Power Stadium. On 22 March 2024, Gray scored on his debut for England U21 in a 2025 UEFA European Under-21 Championship qualification match against Azerbaijan U21, in which England won 5–1 in Baku. He played three games for England in the 2025 UEFA European Under-21 Championship, which England won.

== Player profile ==
Gray has been described as a versatile player, owing to his ability to play in several different positions, including centre-back, right-back, and central midfield. This versatility has seen him struggle to establish himself in any given position, according to manager Roberto De Zerbi.

== Personal life ==
Archie Gray is the son of Andy Gray and Giorgina. He is also the grandson of Frank Gray, and the great nephew of Eddie Gray, all of whom played for Leeds United and represented Scotland at international level.

Archie Gray is one of four brothers, including Harry Gray who plays for Sheffield Wednesday on loan from Leeds United. He is a lifelong supporter of Leeds United and Celtic.

== Career statistics ==
=== Club ===
As of match played 21 November 2026

Appearances and goals by club, season and competition
| Club | Season | League | | | FA Cup | | EFL Cup | | Europe | | Other | | Total | |
| Club | Season | Division | Apps | Goals | Apps | Goals | Apps | Goals | Apps | Goals | Apps | Goals | Apps | Goals |
|---|---|---|---|---|---|---|---|---|---|---|---|---|---|---|
| Leeds United | 2023–24 | Championship | 44 | 0 | 3 | 0 | 2 | 0 | — | | 3 (Note: Appearances in Championship play-offs) | 0 | 52 | 0 |
| Tottenham Hotspur | 2024–25 | Premier League | 28 | 0 | 2 | 0 | 5 | 0 | 11 (Note: Appearances in UEFA Europa League) | 0 | — | | 46 | 0 |
| Tottenham Hotspur | 2025–26 | Premier League | 24 | 2 | 1 | 0 | 1 | 0 | 8 (Note: Appearances in UEFA Champions League) | 0 | 1 (Note: Appearance in UEFA Super Cup) | 0 | 35 | 2 |
| Tottenham Hotspur | 2026–27 | Premier League | 10 | 1 | 0 | 0 | 2 | 0 | — | | — | | 12 | 1 |
| Tottenham Hotspur | Total | | 62 | 3 | 3 | 0 | 8 | 0 | 19 | 0 | 1 | 0 | 93 | 3 |
| Career total | | | 106 | 3 | 6 | 0 | 10 | 0 | 19 | 0 | 4 | 0 | 145 | 3 |

== Honours ==
Tottenham Hotspur

- UEFA Europa League: 2024–25

England U21

- UEFA European Under-21 Championship: 2025

Individual

- EFL Championship Young Player of the Season: 2023–24
- EFL Championship Apprentice of the Season: 2023–24
- Leeds United Young Player of the Season: 2023–24
- PFA Team of the Year: 2023–24 Championship
- London Football Awards Young Player of the Year: 2025
