= 2025–26 Tottenham Hotspur F.C. season =

144th Season in existence of Tottenham Hotspur FC

Tottenham Hotspur
2025–26 season
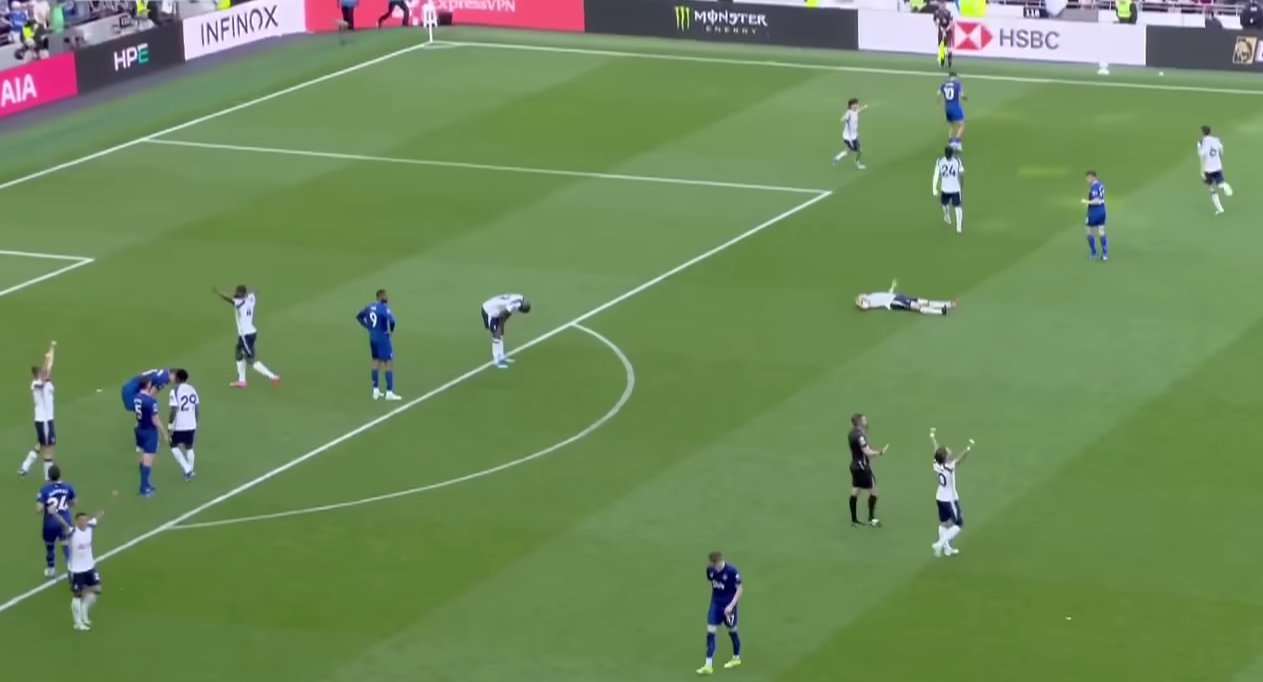
- The reaction of the Tottenham players immediately after the final whistle on the last game of the season against Everton, confirming safety.
- Owner: ENIC International Ltd.
- Chairman: Daniel Levy (until 4 September); Peter Charrington (Non-Executive) (from 4 September)
- Head coach: Thomas Frank (until 11 February); Igor Tudor (interim, from 14 February until 29 March); Roberto De Zerbi (from 31 March)
- Stadium: Tottenham Hotspur Stadium
- Premier League: 17th
- FA Cup: Third round
- EFL Cup: Fourth round
- UEFA Champions League: Round of 16
- UEFA Super Cup: Runners-up
- Top goalscorer: League: Richarlison (11); All: Richarlison (12)
- Highest home attendance: 61,876 v Everton, Premier League, 24 May 2026
- Lowest home attendance: 42,473 v Doncaster Rovers, EFL Cup, 24 September 2025
- Average home league attendance: 61,006
- Biggest win: 4–0 v Copenhagen (H), Champions League, 4 November 2025
- Biggest defeat: 1–4 v Arsenal (A), Premier League, 23 November 2025; 0–3 v Nottingham Forest (A), Premier League, 14 December 2025; 1–4 v Arsenal (H), Premier League, 22 February 2026; 2–5 v Atlético Madrid (A), Champions League, 10 March 2026; 0–3 v Nottingham Forest (H), Premier League, 22 March 2026
Home colours	Away colours	Third colours

The 2025–26 season was the 144th season in the history of Tottenham Hotspur Football Club, their 48th consecutive season in the top flight of English football, and 34th consecutive season in the Premier League. In addition to the domestic league, the club also participated in the FA Cup, the EFL Cup, the UEFA Champions League, and made a debut appearance in the UEFA Super Cup, with the latter two qualifications coming by virtue of winning the UEFA Europa League final 1–0 against Manchester United in the previous season.

The club endured a historically awful season on the pitch, finishing 17th in the Premier League for the second consecutive season. Tottenham were very close to being relegated, ultimately edging out London rivals West Ham United for survival by just two points. Early eliminations from all the cup competitions in conjunction with the league finish ensured Spurs for the 2026–27 season would not play in any UEFA-sanctioned competition for the first time since the 2023–24 season and only the third time since the 2004–05 season.

== Season summary ==
Prior to the season, Thomas Frank was headhunted from Brentford and appointed as head coach on a three-year contract, replacing the sacked Ange Postecoglou. The summer transfer window also saw a significant leadership shift on the pitch, as long-serving captain Son Heung-min departed for Los Angeles FC after a decade at the club. This period of transition reached the boardroom on 4 September 2025, when Daniel Levy resigned (but was widely understood to be de facto sacked by the Lewis Family) as executive chairman after nearly 25 years at the helm, with the Lewis Family citing a lack of footballing success and focus on football.

The season started positively, with a competitive performance in the UEFA Super Cup against heavy favourites and European champions Paris Saint-Germain, albeit with Tottenham ultimately throwing away a 2–0 lead late on to draw 2–2 and losing on penalties. Frank also won his first two league games, including a marquee win over Manchester City away from home, and Spurs were third in the league on Halloween. However, optimism dissipated quickly due to a collapse in form, poor performances in derby losses to Chelsea and Arsenal in November, and growing concerns about a very defensive style of football creating very few chances. Spurs also suffered a very large injury crisis throughout 2026, with parallels to the preceding two seasons. Spurs hurtled down the league and despite pleas for patience Frank grew increasingly unpopular. Tottenham board members Vinai Venkatesham and Johan Lange, promoted to positions of power after Daniel Levy's exit, would face criticism for retaining Thomas Frank for too long. By February 2026, a 2–1 home loss to Newcastle United left Spurs in 16th place, prompting the club to dismiss Frank after only eight months in charge following exits from both domestic cup competitions.

The subsequent managerial search saw Igor Tudor appointed on 17 February as interim head coach. Tudor was known for overseeing immediate upturns in results upon joining new clubs, yet his stint began with disastrous results, suffering losses to Arsenal, Fulham, Crystal Palace and Nottingham Forest in the league. His only other league game was a late-earned draw away at Anfield against Liverpool. He also oversaw a 7–5 Champions League round of 16 aggregate loss to Atlético Madrid, beginning with a 5–2 defeat in Spain, including being 4–0 down after 23 minutes due to goals from poor slips and individual errors. Tudor played backup goalkeeper Antonín Kinský in the match, but substituted him after sixteen minutes following two individual errors to much criticism.

Tudor was sacked as interim head coach on 29 March after just 44 days in charge, in the aftermath of a 3–0 home defeat to Nottingham Forest. He was replaced by Roberto De Zerbi, coming in as permanent manager. The club's situation worsened on 10 April, when a 4–0 victory for West Ham United against Wolverhampton Wanderers pushed Tottenham into the relegation zone after three or more games played for the first time since January 2009. This standing served as the backdrop for De Zerbi's managerial debut two days later, which resulted in a 1–0 defeat at Sunderland.

De Zerbi would go on to lead Spurs to eleven points from their final six matches, which would be enough to clinch safety on the final day and finish 17th. Tottenham went into the last game of the season knowing that only a loss at home to Everton and a win for West Ham at home against Leeds United would see them relegated, excluding an unrealistic twelve goal difference swing. Tottenham won 1–0; a João Palhinha goal in the 43rd minute from a corner was the winner. West Ham were therefore relegated despite a 3–0 win over Leeds.

Despite confirming safety, the season would be remembered as one of the worst in Tottenham's history; the team had a historically close brush with relegation, three managers in a season, the large Champions League round of 16 first leg loss to Atlético Madrid, and were knocked out of the FA Cup in the third round for only the second time in twenty years, being eliminated by Aston Villa. The Premier League finish of 17th meant that it was the first time Tottenham had finished as low as 17th in the top flight two years running for 111 years. The club also lost six matches in a row across all competitions for the first time in their history. Tottenham did not win any of their first fifteen league games of 2026, the second-longest league winless streak in their history (sixteen games without a win in 1934–35). Spurs also experienced historically poor home form, with only three home league wins all season, the joint-lowest by any Premier League team to escape relegation along with Hull City in 2008–09, including a run of one home win in seventeen. Everton were the only team Tottenham beat home and away in the league.

The season was considered by many to be the only serious threat of relegation experienced by a "Big Six" club since the formation of the concept when Manchester City were taken over in 2008. The story of the missteps by the club executives and management, which nearly led Tottenham to what would have been a historic relegation to the Championship for the first time in 49 years, became the dominant narrative across the Premier League for the 2025–26 season.

== Squad information ==
No.	Player	Nationality	Position(s)	Date of birth (age)
Goalkeepers
1	Guglielmo Vicario (4th captain)	(Italy)	GK	7 October 1996 (age 30)
31	Antonín Kinský	(Czech Republic)	GK	13 March 2003 (age 23)
40	Brandon Austin	(United States)	GK	7 January 1999 (age 27)
Defenders
3	Radu Drăgușin	(Romania)	CB	3 February 2002 (age 24)
4	Kevin Danso	(Austria)	CB	19 September 1998 (age 28)
13	Destiny Udogie	(Italy)	LB / LWB / LM	28 November 2002 (age 23)
17	Cristian Romero (captain)	(Argentina)	CB	27 April 1998 (age 28)
23	Pedro Porro	(Spain)	RB / RWB	13 September 1999 (age 27)
24	Djed Spence	(England)	LB / RB / RWB	9 August 2000 (age 26)
33	Ben Davies (3rd captain)	(Wales)	CB / LB	24 April 1993 (age 33)
37	Micky van de Ven (5th captain)	(Netherlands)	CB / LB	19 April 2001 (age 25)
38	Souza	(Brazil)	LB	16 June 2006 (age 20)
Midfielders
6	João Palhinha	(Portugal)	DM / CB / CM	9 July 1995 (age 31)
7	Xavi Simons	(Netherlands)	AM / LW / CM	21 April 2003 (age 23)
8	Yves Bissouma	(Mali)	DM / CM	30 August 1996 (age 30)
10	James Maddison (vice captain)	(England)	AM / CM / RW	23 November 1996 (age 29)
14	Archie Gray	(England)	CM / DM / CB	12 March 2006 (age 20)
15	Lucas Bergvall	(Sweden)	CM / AM	2 February 2006 (age 20)
21	Dejan Kulusevski	(Sweden)	AM / RW / ST	25 April 2000 (age 26)
22	Conor Gallagher	(England)	CM / DM	6 February 2000 (age 26)
29	Pape Matar Sarr	(Senegal)	CM / AM	14 September 2002 (age 24)
30	Rodrigo Bentancur	(Uruguay)	CM / DM	25 June 1997 (age 29)
Forwards
9	Richarlison	(Brazil)	ST / LW	10 April 1997 (age 29)
11	Mathys Tel	(France)	ST / LW / RW	27 April 2005 (age 21)
19	Dominic Solanke	(England)	ST	14 September 1997 (age 29)
20	Mohammed Kudus	(Ghana)	RW / AM / ST	2 August 2000 (age 26)
28	Wilson Odobert	(France)	LW / RW / AM	28 November 2004 (age 21)
39	Randal Kolo Muani	(France)	ST / RW	5 December 1998 (age 27)
Out on loan
16	Luka Vušković	(Croatia)	CB	24 February 2007 (age 19)
18	Yang Min-hyeok	(South Korea)	RW / LW	16 April 2006 (age 20)
25	Kōta Takai	(Japan)	CB	4 September 2004 (age 22)
27	Manor Solomon	(Israel)	LW / RW	24 July 1999 (age 27)
35	Ashley Phillips	(England)	CB	26 June 2005 (age 21)
36	Alejo Véliz	(Argentina)	ST	19 September 2003 (age 23)
44	Dane Scarlett	(England)	ST / LW	24 March 2004 (age 22)
45	Alfie Devine	(England)	CM / AM	11 August 2004 (age 22)

Last updated: 29 November 2025.
Source: Tottenham Hotspur

== Transfers and contracts ==
=== Released ===
Date from	Pos.	Nationality	Player	Subsequent club	Notes	Ref.
30 June 2025	DF	(England)	Archie Baptiste	(England) Middlesbrough	End of contract	
30 June 2025	GK	(England)	Fraser Forster	(England) AFC Bournemouth	End of contract	
30 June 2025	DF	(England)	Maxwell McKnight	(England) Brentford	End of contract	
30 June 2025	DF	(Spain)	Sergio Reguilón	(United States) Inter Miami	End of contract	
30 June 2025	DF	(England)	Max Robson	(England) Forest Green Rovers	End of contract	
30 June 2025	GK	(England)	Charlie Warren	(England) Queens Park Rangers	End of contract	
30 June 2025	FW	(England)	Jaden Williams	(England) Colchester United	End of contract	
30 June 2025	DF	(England)	Timileyin Adekunle	Free agent	End of contract	
30 June 2025	DF	(Wales)	Will Andiyapan	Free agent	End of contract	
30 June 2025	GK	(Albania)	Elliot Krasniqi	Free agent	End of contract	
30 June 2025	DF	(England)	Jahziah Linton	Free agent	End of contract	
30 June 2025	DF	(England)	Dante Orr	Free agent	End of contract	
30 June 2025	GK	(England)	Alfie Whiteman	Retired	End of contract	

=== In ===
Date from	Pos.	Nationality	Player	From	Fee	Ref.
1 June 2025	DF	(Austria)	Kevin Danso	(France) Lens	£21,000,000	
15 June 2025	FW	(France)	Mathys Tel	(Germany) Bayern Munich	£30,000,000	
1 July 2025	DF	(Croatia)	Luka Vušković	(Croatia) Hajduk Split	£12,000,000	(Note: Vušković's transfer was announced on 23 September 2023 and his contract commenced on 1 July 2025.)
4 July 2025	MF	(England)	Max McFadden	(England) Leeds United	Free	
8 July 2025	DF	(Japan)	Kōta Takai	(Japan) Kawasaki Frontale	£5,000,000	
10 July 2025	FW	(Ghana)	Mohammed Kudus	(England) West Ham United	£55,000,000	
27 August 2025	FW	(Scotland)	Conall Glancy	(Scotland) Celtic	Free	
29 August 2025	FW	(Netherlands)	Xavi Simons	(Germany) RB Leipzig	£51,800,000	
1 January 2026	FW	(Republic of Ireland)	Mason Melia	(Republic of Ireland) St Patrick's Athletic	£1,600,000	(Note: Melia's transfer was announced on 4 February 2025 and his contract commenced on 1 January 2026.)
14 January 2026	MF	(England)	Conor Gallagher	(Spain) Atlético Madrid	£35,000,000	
22 January 2026	DF	(Brazil)	Souza	(Brazil) Santos	£13,000,000	
30 January 2026	FW	(England)	Elisha Sowunmi	(England) West Ham United	Undisclosed	
2 February 2026	FW	(England)	Joel Vidal-Philbert	(England) Chelsea	Undisclosed	

=== Out ===
Date from	Pos.	Nationality	Player	To	Fee	Ref.
1 June 2025	MF	(Denmark)	Pierre-Emile Højbjerg	(France) Marseille	£17,000,000	
19 July 2025	GK	(Republic of Ireland)	Josh Keeley	(England) Luton Town	£1,000,000	
6 August 2025	FW	(South Korea)	Son Heung-min	(United States) Los Angeles FC	£20,000,000	
1 September 2025	FW	(Spain)	Bryan Gil	(Spain) Girona	£8,600,000	
2 January 2026	FW	(Wales)	Brennan Johnson	(England) Crystal Palace	£35,000,000	
2 February 2026	FW	(England)	Herbie James	(Wales) Cardiff City	Undisclosed	
6 February 2026	DF	(England)	Roman Egan-Riley	(England) Burnley	Undisclosed	

=== Loaned in ===
Date from	Pos.	Nationality	Player	From	Date until	Ref.
3 August 2025	MF	(Portugal)	João Palhinha	(Germany) Bayern Munich	31 May 2026	
1 September 2025	FW	(France)	Randal Kolo Muani	(France) Paris Saint-Germain	31 May 2026	
2 February 2026	FW	(Scotland)	James Wilson	(Scotland) Heart of Midlothian	End of Season	

=== Loaned out ===
Date from	Pos.	Nationality	Player	To	Date until	Ref.
24 June 2025	FW	(England)	Damola Ajayi	(England) Doncaster Rovers	16 January 2026 (Note: On 16 January, Ajayi was recalled from his loan at Doncaster Rovers.)	
8 July 2025	FW	(Argentina)	Alejo Véliz	(Argentina) Rosario Central	End of season	
19 July 2025	DF	(England)	Alfie Dorrington	(Scotland) Aberdeen	6 January 2026 (Note: On 6 January, Dorrington was recalled from his loan at Aberdeen.)	
23 July 2025	DF	(England)	Ashley Phillips	(England) Stoke City	End of season	
1 August 2025	FW	(England)	Mikey Moore	(Scotland) Rangers	End of season	
4 August 2025	MF	(Jamaica)	Tyrese Hall	(England) Notts County	End of season	
5 August 2025	FW	(England)	Will Lankshear	(England) Oxford United	End of season	
6 August 2025	MF	(Northern Ireland)	Jamie Donley	(England) Stoke City	1 January 2026 (Note: On 1 January, Donley was recalled from his loan at Stoke.)	
6 August 2025	MF	(England)	George Abbott	(England) Wycombe Wanderers	5 January 2026 (Note: On 5 January, Abbott was recalled from his loan at Wycombe.)	
8 August 2025	FW	(South Korea)	Yang Min-hyeok	(England) Portsmouth	6 January 2026 (Note: On 6 January, Yang was recalled from his season-long loan at Portsmouth and subsequently joined Coventry on loan)	
8 August 2025	MF	(England)	Alfie Devine	(England) Preston North End	End of season	
29 August 2025	DF	(Croatia)	Luka Vušković	(Germany) Hamburger SV	End of season	
1 September 2025	FW	(Israel)	Manor Solomon	(Spain) Villarreal CF	2 January 2026 (Note: On 2 January, Solomon was recalled from his loan at Villarreal.)	
2 January 2026	DF	(Japan)	Kōta Takai	(Germany) Borussia Mönchengladbach	End of Season	
2 January 2026	FW	(Israel)	Manor Solomon	(Italy) Fiorentina	End of season	
2 January 2026	MF	(Northern Ireland)	Jamie Donley	(England) Oxford United	End of season	
6 January 2026	FW	(South Korea)	Yang Min-hyeok	(England) Coventry City	End of season	
8 January 2026	FW	(England)	Oliver Irow	(England) Mansfield Town	End of season	
16 January 2026	FW	(England)	Damola Ajayi	(England) Bromley	End of season	
22 January 2026	MF	(Morocco)	Yusuf Akhamrich	(England) Bristol Rovers	End of season	
30 January 2026	FW	(England)	Dane Scarlett	(Scotland) Hibernian	End of season	
2 February 2026	MF	(England)	George Abbott	(England) Mansfield Town	End of season	
2 February 2026	DF	(England)	Alfie Dorrington	(England) Salford City	End of season	
2 February 2026	GK	(England)	Aaron Maguire	(England) Hampton & Richmond Borough	End of season	

=== New contract ===
Date from	Pos.	Nationality	Player	Contracted until	Ref.
30 May 2025	MF	(England)	Harry Byrne	Undisclosed (Note: First professional contract)	
30 May 2025	FW	(England)	Tynan Thompson	Undisclosed	
4 June 2025	FW	(England)	Reiss Elliott-Parris	Undisclosed	
8 June 2025	DF	(Wales)	Ben Davies	30 June 2026	
19 June 2025	FW	(England)	Ellis Lehane	Undisclosed	
20 June 2025	DF	(Jamaica)	Danté Cassanova	30 June 2027	
27 June 2025	FW	(England)	Oliver Irow	30 June 2028	
25 July 2025	MF	(England)	Rio Kyerematen	Undisclosed	
27 July 2025	MF	(England)	George Abbott	Undisclosed	
8 August 2025	MF	(England)	Alfie Devine	Undisclosed	
11 August 2025	FW	(England)	Mikey Moore	Undisclosed	
18 August 2025	DF	(England)	Djed Spence	Undisclosed	
18 August 2025	DF	(Argentina)	Cristian Romero	30 June 2029	
2 October 2025	MF	(England)	Lucá Williams-Barnett	Undisclosed	
3 October 2025	MF	(Uruguay)	Rodrigo Bentancur	Undisclosed	
17 October 2025	GK	(England)	Blake Irow	Undisclosed	
20 November 2025	GK	(England)	Dylan Thompson	Undisclosed	
10 December 2025	DF	(England)	Jun'ai Byfield	Undisclosed	
31 January 2026	MF	(Jamaica)	Tye Hall	Undisclosed	
24 March 2026	FW	(Scotland)	Conall Glancy	Undisclosed	
25 March 2026	DF	(Republic of Ireland)	Harry Byrne	Undisclosed	
26 March 2026	GK	(England)	Carey Bloedorn	Undisclosed	
9 April 2026	DF	(England)	Malachi Hardy	Undisclosed	
10 April 2026	DF	(England)	Tyler Tingey	Undisclosed	
29 April 2026	DF	(England)	James Rowswell	Undisclosed	

== Pre-season and friendlies ==
On 31 March, Tottenham announced a pre-season tour to Asia with a friendly confirmed against Arsenal in Hong Kong, which was the first-ever North London derby outside of the United Kingdom. Tottenham then announced a return to South Korea, to compete in the Coupang Play Series 2025 against Newcastle United. And a trip to Germany to face Bayern Munich for the Telekom Cup was confirmed next. On 13 June, a fourth friendly was added against Luton Town. Two weeks later, a trip to Reading was announced.

A behind-closed-doors friendly against Wycombe Wanderers was also later announced.

Win Draw Loss Fixtures

19 July 2025 Friendly	Reading	0–2	Tottenham Hotspur	Reading
15:00 BST	O'Mahony (yellow card) 32'	Report	Lankshear 49'; Vušković 53'	Stadium: Select Car Leasing Stadium; Attendance: 22,133; Referee: Farai Halam

26 July 2025 Friendly	Tottenham Hotspur	2–2	Wycombe Wanderers	Enfield
11:00 BST	Sarr 14', 66'	Report	Quitirna 32', 50'	Stadium: Hotspur Way; Attendance: 0 Referee: Chris Kavanagh
Note: Match was played behind-closed-doors.

26 July 2025 Friendly	Luton Town	0–0	Tottenham Hotspur	Luton
15:00 BST		Report		Stadium: Kenilworth Road; Attendance: 10,871; Referee: Tom Nield

31 July 2025 Hong Kong Football Festival	Arsenal	0–1	Tottenham Hotspur	Kowloon, Hong Kong
19:30 HKT	Merino (yellow card) 90+3'	Report	Bentancur (yellow card) 36'; Sarr 45'; Johnson (yellow card) 90+3'	Stadium: Kai Tak Sports Park; Attendance: 49,975; Referee: Lau Fong Hei (Hong Kong)

3 August 2025 Coupang Play Series	Tottenham Hotspur	1–1	Newcastle United	Seoul, South Korea
20:00 KST	Johnson 4'; Bissouma (yellow card) 69'; Richarlison (yellow card) 79'	Report	Trippier (yellow card) 31'; Barnes 38'	Stadium: Seoul World Cup Stadium; Attendance: 64,773; Referee: Kim Jong-hyeok (South Korea)

7 August 2025 Telekom Cup	Bayern Munich	4–0	Tottenham Hotspur	Munich, Germany
18:30 CEST	Kane 12', (penalty missed) 15'; Coman 61'; Karl 75'; Kusi-Asare 80'	Report	Romero (yellow card) 41'	Stadium: Allianz Arena; Attendance: 72,000; Referee: Robert Hartmann (Germany)

== Competitions ==
=== Overview ===
Competition	First match	Last match	Starting round	Final position	Record							
Competition	First match	Last match	Starting round	Final position	Pld	W	D	L	GF	GA	GD	Win %
Premier League	16 August 2025	24 May 2026	Matchday 1	17th	38	10	11	17	48	57	−9	26.32
FA Cup	10 January 2026		Third round	Third round	1	0	0	1	1	2	−1	0.00
EFL Cup	24 September 2025	29 October 2025	Third round	Fourth round	2	1	0	1	3	2	+1	50.00
UEFA Champions League	16 September 2025	18 March 2026	League phase	Round of 16	10	6	2	2	22	14	+8	60.00
UEFA Super Cup	13 August 2025		Final	Runners-up	1	0	1	0	2	2	+0	0.00
Total					52	17	14	21	76	77	−1	32.69

Source: Soccerway

=== Premier League ===
==== League table ====
Pos	Team	Pld	W	D	L	GF	GA	GD	Pts	Qualification or relegation
15	Crystal Palace	38	11	12	15	41	51	−10	45	Qualification for the Europa League league phase (Note: Crystal Palace qualified for the Europa League league phase as the 2025–26 UEFA Conference League winners.)
16	Nottingham Forest	38	11	11	16	48	51	−3	44	
17	Tottenham Hotspur	38	10	11	17	48	57	−9	41	
18	West Ham United (R)	38	10	9	19	46	65	−19	39	Relegation to EFL Championship
19	Burnley (R)	38	4	10	24	38	75	−37	22	Relegation to EFL Championship

Source: Premier League
Rules for classification: 1) Points; 2) Goal difference; 3) Goals scored; 4) If the champions, relegated teams or qualified teams for UEFA competitions cannot be determined by rules 1 to 3, rules 4.1 to 4.3 are applied – 4.1) Points gained in head-to-head record between such teams; 4.2) Away goals scored in head-to-head record between such teams; 4.3) Play-offs
(R) Relegated

==== Results summary ====
Overall								Home						Away					
Pld	W	D	L	GF	GA	GD	Pts	W	D	L	GF	GA	GD	W	D	L	GF	GA	GD
38	10	11	17	48	57	−9	41	3	6	10	22	31	−9	7	5	7	26	26	0

Source: Soccerway

==== Results by round ====
Round	1	2	3	4	5	6	7	8	9	10	11	12	13	14	15	16	17	18	19	20	21	22	23	24	25	26	27	28	29	30	31	32	33	34	35	36	37	38
Ground	H	A	H	A	A	H	A	H	A	H	H	A	H	A	H	A	H	A	A	H	A	H	A	H	A	H	H	A	H	A	H	A	H	A	A	H	A	H
Result	W	W	L	W	D	D	W	L	W	L	D	L	L	D	W	L	L	W	D	D	L	L	D	D	L	L	L	L	L	D	L	L	D	W	W	D	L	W
Position	3	2	4	3	3	4	3	6	3	6	5	9	12	11	11	11	14	11	12	13	14	14	14	14	15	16	16	16	16	16	17	18	18	18	17	17	17	17
Points	3	6	6	9	10	11	14	14	17	17	18	18	18	19	22	22	22	25	26	27	27	27	28	29	29	29	29	29	29	30	30	30	31	34	37	38	38	41

Source: Soccerway
A = Away; H = Home; W = Win; D = Draw; L = Loss; P = Postponed

==== Matches ====
On 18 June 2025, the Premier League fixtures were released, with Tottenham at home to Burnley on the opening weekend.

Win Draw Loss Fixtures

12 August 2017 1	Tottenham Hotspur	3–0	Burnley	Tottenham
15:00 BST	Richarlison 10', 60'; Johnson 66'	Report		Stadium: Tottenham Hotspur Stadium; Attendance: 61,077; Referee: Michael Oliver

23 August 2025 2	Manchester City	0–2	Tottenham Hotspur	Manchester
12:30 BST	González (yellow card) 71'	Report	Johnson (yellow card) 34', (goal) 35'; Palhinha 45+2'; Romero (yellow card) 68'; Richarlison (yellow card) 71'; Porro (yellow card) 81'	Stadium: Etihad Stadium; Attendance: 52,491; Referee: Peter Bankes
Note: Fixture was originally scheduled for a 15:00 kick-off, but was moved for live TNT Sports broadcasting.

30 August 2025 3	Tottenham Hotspur	0–1	Bournemouth	Tottenham
15:00 BST	Van de Ven (yellow card) 14'; Spence (yellow card) 65'	Report	Evanilson 5'; Semenyo (yellow card) 12'; Petrović (yellow card) 72'; Adams (yellow card) 88'; Hill (yellow card) 90+7'	Stadium: Tottenham Hotspur Stadium; Attendance: 61,250; Referee: Simon Hooper

13 September 2025 4	West Ham United	0–3	Tottenham Hotspur	Stratford
17:30 BST	Souček (red card) 54'	Report	Sarr 47'; Spence (yellow card) 52'; Bergvall 57'; Van de Ven 64'	Stadium: London Stadium; Attendance: 62,459; Referee: Jarred Gillett
Note: Fixture was originally scheduled for a 15:00 kick-off, but was moved for live Sky Sports broadcasting.

20 September 2025 5	Brighton & Hove Albion	2–2	Tottenham Hotspur	Brighton and Hove
15:00 BST	Minteh 8'; Ayari 31'; Gómez (yellow card) 73'	Report	Richarlison 43'; Kudus (yellow card) 46'; Van Hecke 82' (o.g.); Romero (yellow card) 88'	Stadium: Falmer Stadium; Attendance: 31,488; Referee: Chris Kavanagh

27 September 2025 6	Tottenham Hotspur	1–1	Wolverhampton Wanderers	Tottenham
20:00 BST	Simons (yellow card) 32'; Bergvall (yellow card) 65'; Palhinha 90+4', (yellow card) 90+4'	Report	Doherty (yellow card) 35'; João Gomes (yellow card) 39'; S. Bueno 54'	Stadium: Tottenham Hotspur Stadium; Attendance: 60,537; Referee: Michael Salisbury
Note: Fixture was originally scheduled for a 15:00 kick-off, but was moved for live Sky Sports broadcasting.

4 October 2025 7	Leeds United	1–2	Tottenham Hotspur	Leeds
12:30 BST	Okafor 34', (yellow card) 64'; Ampadu (yellow card) 52'	Report	Kudus (yellow card) 22', (goal) 57'; Tel 23'; Palhinha (yellow card) 41'; Romero (yellow card) 64'	Stadium: Elland Road; Attendance: 36,703; Referee: Thomas Bramall

19 October 2025 8	Tottenham Hotspur	1–2	Aston Villa	Tottenham
14:00 BST	Bentancur 5'; Van de Ven (yellow card) 22'; Danso (yellow card) 67'	Report	Rogers 37'; Buendía 77'	Stadium: Tottenham Hotspur Stadium; Attendance: 61,291; Referee: Simon Hooper

26 October 2025 9	Everton	0–3	Tottenham Hotspur	Liverpool
16:30 GMT	Garner (yellow card) 58'; Grealish (yellow card) 71'	Report	Van de Ven 19', 45+6'; Sarr 89'	Stadium: Hill Dickinson Stadium; Attendance: 52,501; Referee: Craig Pawson

1 November 2025 10	Tottenham Hotspur	0–1	Chelsea	Tottenham
17:30 GMT	Bentancur (yellow card) 45+3'; Danso (yellow card) 47'; Simons (yellow card) 59'; Kudus (yellow card) 74'	Report	João Pedro 34'; Chalobah (yellow card) 45+3'; Fernández (yellow card) 68'	Stadium: Tottenham Hotspur Stadium; Attendance: 61,202; Referee: Jarred Gillett
Note: Fixture was originally scheduled for a 15:00 kick-off, but was moved for live Sky Sports broadcasting.

8 November 2025 11	Tottenham Hotspur	2–2	Manchester United	Tottenham
12:30 GMT	Johnson (yellow card) 29'; Romero (yellow card) 34'; Palhinha (yellow card) 75'; Tel 84'; Richarlison 90+1', (yellow card) 90+2'; Danso (yellow card) 90+7'	Report	Mbeumo 32'; Dorgu (yellow card) 78'; De Ligt 90+6'	Stadium: Tottenham Hotspur Stadium; Attendance: 61,210; Referee: Sam Barrott
Note: Fixture was originally scheduled for a 15:00 kick-off, but was moved for live TNT Sports broadcasting.

23 November 2025 12	Arsenal	4–1	Tottenham Hotspur	Holloway
16:30 GMT	Trossard 36'; Eze 41', 46', 76'; Rice (yellow card) 87'	Report	Bentancur (yellow card) 32'; Richarlison 55'; Romero (yellow card) 70'; Porro (yellow card) 87'	Stadium: Emirates Stadium; Attendance: 60,345; Referee: Michael Oliver
Note: Fixture was originally scheduled for 22 November, but was moved for live Sky Sports broadcasting.

29 November 2025 13	Tottenham Hotspur	1–2	Fulham	Tottenham
20:00 GMT	Van de Ven (yellow card) 30'; Udogie (yellow card) 49'; Kudus 59'; Kolo Muani (yellow card) 90+4'	Report	Tete 4'; Wilson 6'; Jiménez (yellow card) 78'; Leno (yellow card) 90+1'	Stadium: Tottenham Hotspur Stadium; Attendance: 60,546; Referee: Stuart Attwell
Note: Fixture was originally scheduled for a 15:00 kick-off, but was moved for live Sky Sports broadcasting.

2 December 2025 14	Newcastle United	2–2	Tottenham Hotspur	Newcastle upon Tyne
20:15 GMT	Bruno Guimarães 71'; Gordon 86' (pen.)	Report	Romero (yellow card) 23', (goal) 78', 90+5'; Bentancur (yellow card) 56'; Richarlison (yellow card) 86'	Stadium: St James' Park; Attendance: 52,007; Referee: Thomas Bramall
Note: Fixture was originally scheduled for 3 December, but was moved for live Sky Sports broadcasting.

6 December 2025 15	Tottenham Hotspur	2–0	Brentford	Tottenham
15:00 GMT	Richarlison 25'; Romero (yellow card) 31'; Simons 43'; Porro (yellow card) 47'; Gray (yellow card) 77'	Report	Kayode (yellow card) 29'; Ajer (yellow card) 45'; Schade (yellow card) 60'; Yarmolyuk (yellow card) 72'	Stadium: Tottenham Hotspur Stadium; Attendance: 60,759; Referee: Robert Jones

14 December 2025 16	Nottingham Forest	3–0	Tottenham Hotspur	West Bridgford
14:00 GMT	Hudson-Odoi 28', 50'; Savona (yellow card) 31'; Sangaré 79'	Report	Gray (yellow card) 40'; Bergvall (yellow card) 70'; Porro (yellow card) 84'	Stadium: City Ground; Attendance: 30,579; Referee: Sam Barrott
Note: Fixture was originally scheduled for 13 December, but was moved for live Sky Sports broadcasting.

20 December 2025 17	Tottenham Hotspur	1–2	Liverpool	Tottenham
17:30 GMT	Simons (red card) 33'; Romero (yellow card) 66' (yellow-red card) 90+3'; Richarlison 83', (yellow card) 90+11'; Van de Ven (yellow card) 85'; Bentancur (yellow card) 90+5'	Report	Isak 56'; Ekitike 66'; Konaté (yellow card) 76'; Szoboszlai (yellow card) 83'; Mac Allister (yellow card) 90+7'	Stadium: Tottenham Hotspur Stadium; Attendance: 61,138; Referee: John Brooks
Note: Fixture was originally scheduled for a 15:00 kick-off, but was moved for live Sky Sports broadcasting.

28 December 2025 18	Crystal Palace	0–1	Tottenham Hotspur	Selhurst
16:30 GMT	Hughes (yellow card) 45+3'; Lacroix (yellow card) 46'; Lerma (yellow card) 85'	Report	Danso (yellow card) 5'; Gray (yellow card) 22', (goal) 42'	Stadium: Selhurst Park; Attendance: 25,186; Referee: Jarred Gillett
Note: Fixture was originally scheduled for 27 December, but was moved for live Sky Sports broadcasting.

1 January 2026 19	Brentford	0–0	Tottenham Hotspur	Brentford
20:00 GMT	Henderson (yellow card) 58'	Report	Palhinha (yellow card) 60'; Vicario (yellow card) 69'	Stadium: Brentford Community Stadium; Attendance: 17,141; Referee: Andrew Madley
Note: Fixture was originally scheduled for 30 December, but was moved for live Sky Sports broadcasting.

4 January 2026 20	Tottenham Hotspur	1–1	Sunderland	Tottenham
15:00 GMT	Davies 30'; Bentancur (yellow card) 83'; Palhinha (yellow card) 90+6'	Report	Cirkin (yellow card) 47'; Alderete (yellow card) 50'; Le Fée (yellow card) 60'; Brobbey 80'	Stadium: Tottenham Hotspur Stadium; Attendance: 60,877; Referee: Stuart Attwell
Note: Fixture was originally scheduled for 3 January, but was moved for live Sky Sports broadcasting.

7 January 2026 21	Bournemouth	3–2	Tottenham Hotspur	Bournemouth
19:30 GMT	Evanilson 22'; Kroupi 36'; Semenyo (yellow card) 43', (goal) 90+5'; Cook (yellow card) 51'; Jiménez (yellow card) 77'	Report	Tel 5'; Porro (yellow card) 60'; Kolo Muani (yellow card) 61'; Van de Ven (yellow card) 75'; Palhinha 78'	Stadium: Dean Court; Attendance: 11,212; Referee: Darren England
Note: Fixture was originally scheduled for a 20:00 kick-off, but was moved for live Sky Sports broadcasting.

17 January 2026 22	Tottenham Hotspur	1–2	West Ham United	Tottenham
15:00 GMT	Davies (yellow card) 19'; Gray (yellow card) 39'; Romero (yellow card) 45+1', (goal) 64'; Van de Ven (yellow card) 57'; Spence (yellow card) 78'	Report	Castellanos (yellow card) 1'; Summerville 15'; Bowen (yellow card) 52'; Souček (yellow card) 72'; Wilson 90+3'	Stadium: Tottenham Hotspur Stadium; Attendance: 60,857; Referee: Jarred Gillett

24 January 2026 23	Burnley	2–2	Tottenham Hotspur	Burnley
15:00 GMT	Tuanzebe 45'; Foster 76'; Laurent (yellow card) 79'	Report	Van de Ven 38'; Romero 90'	Stadium: Turf Moor; Attendance: 21,618; Referee: Peter Bankes

1 February 2026 24	Tottenham Hotspur	2–2	Manchester City	Tottenham
16:30 GMT	Bissouma (yellow card) 11'; Simons (yellow card) 38'; Solanke (yellow card) 48', (goal) 53', 70'	Report	Cherki 11'; Khusanov (yellow card) 21'; Semenyo 44'; Rodri (yellow card) 45+3'; González (yellow card) 90+8'	Stadium: Tottenham Hotspur Stadium; Attendance: 61,337; Referee: Robert Jones
Note: Fixture was originally scheduled for 31 January, but was moved for live Sky Sports broadcasting.

7 February 2026 25	Manchester United	2–0	Tottenham Hotspur	Trafford
12:30 GMT	Mbeumo 38'; Amad (yellow card) 45'; Fernandes 81'	Report	Udogie (yellow card) 27'; Romero (red card) 29'; Palhinha (yellow card) 70'	Stadium: Old Trafford; Attendance: 73,985; Referee: Michael Oliver
Note: Fixture was initially scheduled for a 15:00 kick-off, but was rescheduled for live TNT Sports broadcasting.

10 February 2026 26	Tottenham Hotspur	1–2	Newcastle United	Tottenham
19:30 GMT	Sarr (yellow card) 41'; Spence (yellow card) 62'; Gray 64'; Simons (yellow card) 67'	Report	Thiaw 45+5'; Burn (yellow card) 59'; Ramsey 68'; Bruno Guimarães (yellow card) 89'	Stadium: Tottenham Hotspur Stadium; Attendance: 59,773; Referee: Anthony Taylor
Note: Fixture was initially scheduled for a 20:00 kick-off, but was rescheduled for live TNT Sports broadcasting.

22 February 2026 27	Tottenham Hotspur	1–4	Arsenal	Tottenham
16:30 GMT	Kolo Muani 34'; Gray (yellow card) 35'; Bissouma (yellow card) 86'	Report	Timber (yellow card) 27'; Eze 32', 61'; Gyökeres 47', 90+4'	Stadium: Tottenham Hotspur Stadium; Attendance: 61,439; Referee: Peter Bankes
Note: Fixture was initially scheduled for 21 February, but was rescheduled for live Sky Sports broadcasting.

1 March 2026 28	Fulham	2–1	Tottenham Hotspur	Fulham
14:00 GMT	Wilson 7'; Iwobi 34'; Diop (yellow card) 61'; Bassey (yellow card) 66'; Cairney (yellow card) 90+2'	Report	Van de Ven (yellow card) 64'; Richarlison 66', (yellow card) 66'; Porro (yellow card) 90+5'	Stadium: Craven Cottage; Attendance: 27,439; Referee: Paul Tierney
Note: Fixture was initially scheduled for 28 February, but was rescheduled for live Sky Sports broadcasting.

5 March 2026 29	Tottenham Hotspur	1–3	Crystal Palace	Tottenham
20:00 GMT	Souza (yellow card) 7'; Sarr (yellow card) 25'; Solanke 34'; Van de Ven (red card) 38'; Bissouma (yellow card) 82'	Report	Larsen (yellow card) 22', (goal) 45+1'; Sarr 40' (pen.), 45+7'; Clyne (yellow card) 90+2'	Stadium: Tottenham Hotspur Stadium; Attendance: 60,213; Referee: Andrew Madley
Note: Fixture was initially scheduled for 4 March, but was rescheduled for live TNT Sports broadcasting.

15 March 2026 30	Liverpool	1–1	Tottenham Hotspur	Liverpool
16:30 GMT	Szoboszlai 18'	Report	Richarlison 90'	Stadium: Anfield; Attendance: 60,386; Referee: Chris Kavanagh
Note: Fixture was initially scheduled for 14 March, but was rescheduled for live Sky Sports broadcasting.

22 March 2026 31	Tottenham Hotspur	0–3	Nottingham Forest	Tottenham
14:15 GMT	Udogie (yellow card) 82'	Report	Igor Jesus 45'; Sangaré (yellow card) 53'; Gibbs-White 62'; Awoniyi 87', (yellow card) 88'	Stadium: Tottenham Hotspur Stadium; Attendance: 61,519; Referee: Michael Oliver
Note: Fixture was initially scheduled for 21 March, but was rescheduled for live Sky Sports broadcasting.

12 April 2026 32	Sunderland	1–0	Tottenham Hotspur	Sunderland
14:00 BST	Brobbey (yellow card) 33'; Mukiele 61'; Rigg (yellow card) 75'; Hume (yellow card) 90+1'	Report	Romero (yellow card) 28'; Van de Ven (yellow card) 37'; Porro (yellow card) 37'	Stadium: Stadium of Light; Attendance: 47,010; Referee: Robert Jones
Note: Fixture was initially scheduled for 11 April, but was rearranged for live Sky Sports broadcasting.

18 April 2026 33	Tottenham Hotspur	2–2	Brighton & Hove Albion	Tottenham
17:30 BST	Bissouma (yellow card) 34'; Porro 39'; Danso (yellow card) 65'; Simons 77', (yellow card) 78'	Report	Wieffer (yellow card) 37'; Mitoma 45+3'; Rutter 90+5'	Stadium: Tottenham Hotspur Stadium; Attendance: 61,167; Referee: Stuart Attwell
Note: Fixture was initially scheduled for a 15:00 kick-off, but was pushed back for live Sky Sports broadcasting.

25 April 2026 34	Wolverhampton Wanderers	0–1	Tottenham Hotspur	Wolverhampton
15:00 BST	André (yellow card) 45+3'; H. Bueno (yellow card) 56'; João Gomes (yellow card) 90+6'	Report	Porro (yellow card) 56'; Bentancur (yellow card) 65'; Gallagher (yellow card) 74'; Palhinha 82'; Danso (yellow card) 90+7'	Stadium: Molineux Stadium; Attendance: 31,253; Referee: Anthony Taylor

3 May 2026 35	Aston Villa	1–2	Tottenham Hotspur	Birmingham
19:00 BST	Barkley (yellow card) 51'; Rogers (yellow card) 77'; Buendía 90+6'	Report	Gallagher 12', (yellow card) 90+6'; Richarlison 25'; Kolo Muani (yellow card) 27'; Bentancur (yellow card) 45'; Tel (yellow card) 73'; Danso (yellow card) 81'	Stadium: Villa Park; Attendance: 42,767; Referee: Sam Barrott
Note: Fixture was initially scheduled for a 15:00 kick-off, but was initially brought forward for live TNT Sports broadcasting, and then pushed back due to Aston Villa's progression to the UEFA Europa League semi-finals.

11 May 2026 36	Tottenham Hotspur	1–1	Leeds United	Tottenham
20:00 BST	Danso (yellow card) 41'; Tel 50'; Palhinha (yellow card) 66'; Porro (yellow card) 82'	Report	Calvert-Lewin 74' (pen.); Rodon (yellow card) 79'	Stadium: Tottenham Hotspur Stadium; Attendance: 61,048; Referee: Jarred Gillett
Note: Fixture was initially scheduled for 9 May, but was pushed back two-days for live Sky Sports broadcasting.

19 May 2026 37	Chelsea	2–1	Tottenham Hotspur	Fulham
20:15 BST	Fernández 18'; Santos 67'; Hato (yellow card) 79'; Cucurella (yellow card) 85'; Delap (yellow card) 87'; Essugo (yellow card) 90+2'	Report	Porro (yellow card) 28'; Van de Ven (yellow card) 43'; Udogie (yellow card) 63'; Richarlison 74'	Stadium: Stamford Bridge; Attendance: 39,463; Referee: Stuart Attwell

24 May 2026 38	Tottenham Hotspur	1–0	Everton	Tottenham
16:00 BST	Palhinha 43', (yellow card) 87'; Sarr (yellow card) 80'; Kinský (yellow card) 90+7'	Report	O'Brien (yellow card) 13'; Tarkowski (yellow card) 89'	Stadium: Tottenham Hotspur Stadium; Attendance: 61,876; Referee: Michael Oliver

=== FA Cup ===
As a Premier League club, Tottenham entered the FA Cup in the third round, and were drawn at home to Aston Villa.

Win Draw Loss Fixtures

10 January 2026 Third round	Tottenham Hotspur	1–2	Aston Villa	Tottenham
17:45 GMT	Odobert 54'; Gray (yellow card) 57'; Porro (yellow card) 79'; Palhinha (yellow card) 85'	Report	Buendía 22', (yellow card) 67'; Rogers 45+3'; García (yellow card) 81'	Stadium: Tottenham Hotspur Stadium; Attendance: 57,718; Referee: Craig Pawson

=== EFL Cup ===
As one of the Premier League teams involved in a European competition, Tottenham entered the EFL Cup in the third round, and were drawn at home to Doncaster Rovers. They were then drawn away to Newcastle United in the fourth round.

24 September 2025 Third round	Tottenham Hotspur	3–0	Doncaster Rovers	Tottenham
19:45 BST	Palhinha 14'; McGrath 17' (o.g.); Porro (yellow card) 85'; Johnson 90+4'	Report	Bailey (yellow card) 19'	Stadium: Tottenham Hotspur Stadium; Attendance: 42,473; Referee: Andrew Madley

29 October 2025 Fourth round	Newcastle United	2–0	Tottenham Hotspur	Newcastle upon Tyne
20:00 GMT	Schär 24', (yellow card) 57'; Thiaw (yellow card) 45+1'; Woltemade 50'; Trippier (yellow card) 81'; Joelinton (yellow card) 86'	Report	Richarlison (yellow card) 25'; Palhinha (yellow card) 33'; Kudus (yellow card) 86'	Stadium: St James' Park; Attendance: 51,216; Referee: Chris Kavanagh

=== UEFA Champions League ===
==== League phase ====
Tottenham were drawn against Villarreal, Copenhagen, Slavia Prague and Borussia Dortmund at home, and Bodø/Glimt, Monaco, Paris Saint-Germain and Eintracht Frankfurt away in the league phase.

Pos	Team	Pld	W	D	L	GF	GA	GD	Pts	Qualification
2	(German Football Association) Bayern Munich	8	7	0	1	22	8	+14	21	Advance to round of 16 (seeded)
3	(The Football Association) Liverpool	8	6	0	2	20	8	+12	18	Advance to round of 16 (seeded)
4	(The Football Association) Tottenham Hotspur	8	5	2	1	17	7	+10	17	Advance to round of 16 (seeded)
5	(Royal Spanish Football Federation) Barcelona	8	5	1	2	22	14	+8	16	Advance to round of 16 (seeded)
6	(The Football Association) Chelsea	8	5	1	2	17	10	+7	16	Advance to round of 16 (seeded)

Source: UEFA
Rules for classification: League phase tiebreakers

Round	1	2	3	4	5	6	7	8
Ground	H	A	A	H	A	H	H	A
Result	W	D	D	W	L	W	W	W
Position	14	9	15	10	16	11	5	4
Points	3	4	5	8	8	11	14	17

Source: UEFA
A = Away; H = Home; W = Win; D = Draw; L = Loss

Win Draw Loss Fixtures

16 September 2025 1	Tottenham Hotspur (England)	1–0	(Spain) Villarreal	London, England
20:00 BST	Luiz Júnior 4' (o.g.); Simons (yellow card) 30'; Richarlison (yellow card) 33'; Kolo Muani (yellow card) 78'; Van de Ven (yellow card) 84'	Report	Comesaña (yellow card) 35'; Mouriño (yellow card) 36'; Veiga (yellow card) 53'	Stadium: Tottenham Hotspur Stadium; Attendance: 54,755; Referee: Rade Obrenović (Slovenia)

30 September 2025 2	Bodø/Glimt (Norway)	2–2	(England) Tottenham Hotspur	Bodø, Norway
21:00 CEST	Høgh (penalty missed) 35'; Hauge 53', 66'; Berg (yellow card) 68'; Auklend (yellow card) 72'	Report	Van de Ven (yellow card) 58', (goal) 68'; Gundersen 89' (o.g.); Porro (yellow card) 90+7'	Stadium: Aspmyra Stadion; Attendance: 7,988; Referee: Ivan Kružliak (Slovakia)

22 October 2025 3	Monaco (France)	0–0	(England) Tottenham Hotspur	Fontvieille, Monaco
21:00 CEST		Report	Richarlison (yellow card) 47'	Stadium: Stade Louis II; Attendance: 11,365; Referee: Marco Guida (Italy)

4 November 2025 4	Tottenham Hotspur (England)	4–0	(Denmark) Copenhagen	London, England
20:00 GMT	Johnson 19', (red card) 55'; Kolo Muani (yellow card) 39'; Odobert 51'; Van de Ven 64'; Palhinha 67'; Richarlison (penalty missed) 90+2'	Report	Pereira (yellow card) 15'; Suzuki (yellow card) 62'; Lerager (yellow card) 90+1'	Stadium: Tottenham Hotspur Stadium; Attendance: 49,565; Referee: Erik Lambrechts (Belgium)

26 November 2025 5	Paris Saint-Germain (France)	5–3	(England) Tottenham Hotspur	Paris, France
21:00 CET	Vitinha 45', 53', 76' (pen.); Fabián 59'; Pacho 65'; Hernandez (red card) 90+3'	Report	Richarlison 35'; Bergvall (yellow card) 45+2'; Kolo Muani 50', 73'	Stadium: Parc des Princes; Attendance: 47,574; Referee: Felix Zwayer (Germany)

9 December 2025 6	Tottenham Hotspur (England)	3–0	(Czech Republic) Slavia Prague	London, England
20:00 GMT	Van de Ven (yellow card) 15'; Zima 26' (o.g.); Palhinha (yellow card) 40'; Kudus 50' (pen.); Simons 79' (pen.)	Report	Chaloupek (yellow card) 13'; Ogbu (yellow card) 28'; Sanyang (yellow card) 48'; Zima (yellow card) 56'	Stadium: Tottenham Hotspur Stadium; Attendance: 47,281; Referee: Benoît Bastien (France)

20 January 2026 7	Tottenham Hotspur (England)	2–0	(Germany) Borussia Dortmund	London, England
20:00 GMT	Romero 14'; Solanke 37'; Gray (yellow card) 86'	Report	Svensson (red card) 24'; Ryerson (yellow card) 86'	Stadium: Tottenham Hotspur Stadium; Attendance: 52,713; Referee: Glenn Nyberg (Sweden)

28 January 2026 8	Eintracht Frankfurt (Germany)	0–2	(England) Tottenham Hotspur	Frankfurt, Germany
21:00 CET		Report	Kolo Muani 47'; Vicario (yellow card) 75'; Solanke 77'; Palhinha (yellow card) 90+2'	Stadium: Deutsche Bank Park; Attendance: 58,000; Referee: Jesús Gil Manzano (Spain)

==== Knockout phase ====
===== Round of 16 =====
Spurs were drawn against Atlético Madrid in the round of 16, with the first leg being away.

10 March 2026 First leg	Atlético Madrid (Spain)	5–2	(England) Tottenham Hotspur	Madrid, Spain
21:00 CET	Llorente 6'; Griezmann 14'; Alvarez 15', 55'; Le Normand 22'	Report	Spence (yellow card) 4'; Porro 26'; Richarlison (yellow card) 60'; Gray (yellow card) 62'; Solanke 76'; Danso (yellow card) 80'; Romero (yellow card) 85'	Stadium: Metropolitano Stadium; Attendance: 64,168; Referee: Serdar Gözübüyük (Netherlands)

18 March 2026 Second leg	Tottenham Hotspur (England)	3–2 (5–7 agg.)	(Spain) Atlético Madrid	London, England
20:00 GMT	Kolo Muani 30'; Simons 52', 90' (pen.); Porro (yellow card) 57'; Vicario (yellow card) 58'; Romero (yellow card) 70'; Udogie (yellow card) 72'	Report	Ruggeri (yellow card) 28'; Alvarez 47'; Lookman (yellow card) 56'; Hancko 75'; Sørloth (yellow card) 90+2'	Stadium: Tottenham Hotspur Stadium; Attendance: 49,568; Referee: Daniel Siebert (Germany)

=== UEFA Super Cup ===
As winners of the 2024–25 UEFA Europa League, Spurs competed in their first ever UEFA Super Cup match against the winners of the 2024–25 UEFA Champions League, Paris Saint-Germain.

13 August 2025 Final	Paris Saint-Germain (France)	2–2 (4–3 p)	(England) Tottenham Hotspur	Udine, Italy
21:00 CEST	Barcola (yellow card) 55'; Pacho (yellow card) 58'; Lee Kang-in 85'; Dembélé (yellow card) 90'; Ramos 90+4'	Report	Van de Ven 39'; Romero 48'; Richarlison (yellow card) 53'; Danso (yellow card) 62'	Stadium: Stadio Friuli; Attendance: 21,025; Referee: João Pinheiro (Portugal)
	Penalties
	Vitinha (penalty missed); Ramos (penalty scored); Dembélé (penalty scored); Lee Kang-in (penalty scored); Mendes (penalty scored)		(penalty scored) Solanke; (penalty scored) Bentancur; (penalty missed) Van de Ven; (penalty missed) Tel; (penalty scored) Porro

== Statistics ==
=== Appearances ===
Players with no appearances are not included on the list

No.	Pos.	Player	Premier League		FA Cup		EFL Cup		Champions League		Super Cup		Total	
No.	Pos.	Player	Apps	Goals	Apps	Goals	Apps	Goals	Apps	Goals	Apps	Goals	Apps	Goals
1	GK	(Italy) Guglielmo Vicario	31	0	1	0	0	0	9+1	0	1	0	42+1	0
3	DF	(Romania) Radu Drăgușin	5+5	0	0	0	0	0	1	0	0	0	6+5	0
4	DF	(Austria) Kevin Danso	17+7	0	1	0	2	0	5+3	0	1	0	26+10	0
6	MF	(Portugal) João Palhinha	23+10	5	1	0	2	1	3+5	1	1	0	30+15	7
7	FW	(Netherlands) Xavi Simons	19+9	2	1	0	2	0	6+4	3	0	0	28+13	5
8	MF	(Mali) Yves Bissouma	7+4	0	0	0	0	0	0	0	0	0	7+4	0
9	FW	(Brazil) Richarlison	20+12	11	1	0	1+1	0	6+1	1	1	0	29+14	12
10	MF	(England) James Maddison	0+3	0	0	0	0	0	0	0	0	0	0+3	0
11	FW	(France) Mathys Tel	13+18	4	1	0	1+1	0	2	0	0+2	0	17+21	4
13	DF	(Italy) Destiny Udogie	14+6	0	0	0	0+1	0	3+4	0	0	0	17+11	0
14	MF	(England) Archie Gray	18+6	2	1	0	1	0	7+1	0	0+1	0	27+8	2
15	MF	(Sweden) Lucas Bergvall	11+12	1	0	0	1+1	0	5+2	0	0+1	0	17+16	1
17	DF	(Argentina) Cristian Romero	22+1	4	0	0	0	0	8	1	1	1	31+1	6
19	FW	(England) Dominic Solanke	11+4	3	0+1	0	0	0	1+2	3	0+1	0	12+8	6
20	MF	(Ghana) Mohammed Kudus	19	2	0	0	0+1	0	3+2	1	1	0	23+3	3
22	MF	(England) Conor Gallagher	14+2	1	0	0	0	0	0+2	0	0	0	14+4	1
23	DF	(Spain) Pedro Porro	31+2	1	1	0	2	0	9	1	1	0	44+2	2
24	DF	(England) Djed Spence	23+7	0	0+1	0	2	0	8+2	0	1	0	34+10	0
28	FW	(France) Wilson Odobert	10+14	0	1	1	1	0	6+1	1	0	0	18+15	2
29	MF	(Senegal) Pape Matar Sarr	13+13	2	0	0	0+1	0	7+2	0	1	0	21+16	2
30	MF	(Uruguay) Rodrigo Bentancur	23+3	1	0	0	2	0	5	0	1	0	31+3	1
31	GK	(Czech Republic) Antonín Kinský	7	0	0	0	2	0	1	0	0	0	10	0
33	DF	(Wales) Ben Davies	2+1	1	1	0	0	0	0+1	0	0	0	3+2	1
37	DF	(Netherlands) Micky van de Ven	35	4	1	0	0	0	8	2	1	1	45	7
38	DF	(Brazil) Souza	2+2	0	0	0	0	0	0	0	0	0	2+2	0
39	FW	(France) Randal Kolo Muani	21+9	1	0+1	0	0+1	0	5+4	4	0	0	26+15	5
44	FW	(England) Dane Scarlett	0+2	0	0+1	0	0	0	0+2	0	0	0	0+5	0
52	MF	(England) Callum Olusesi	0+1	0	0	0	0	0	0+1	0	0	0	0+2	0
67	DF	(England) Jun'ai Byfield	0+1	0	0	0	0	0	0+2	0	0	0	0+3	0
68	MF	(England) Lucá Williams-Barnett	0	0	0	0	0+1	0	0	0	0	0	0+1	0
76	DF	(England) James Rowswell	0+1	0	0	0	0	0	0	0	0	0	0+1	0
Player(s) who featured but departed the club permanently during the season:
22	FW	(Wales) Brennan Johnson	6+10	2	0	0	2	1	2+2	1	0	0	10+12	4

Source: Premier League

=== Goalscorers ===
The list is sorted by squad number when total goals are equal.

Rank	Pos.	No.	Player	Premier League	FA Cup	EFL Cup	Champions League	Super Cup	Total
1	FW	9	(Brazil) Richarlison	11	0	0	1	0	12
2	MF	6	(Portugal) João Palhinha	5	0	1	1	0	7
2	DF	37	(Netherlands) Micky van de Ven	4	0	0	2	1	7
4	DF	17	(Argentina) Cristian Romero	4	0	0	1	1	6
4	FW	19	(England) Dominic Solanke	3	0	0	3	0	6
6	FW	7	(Netherlands) Xavi Simons	2	0	0	3	0	5
6	FW	39	(France) Randal Kolo Muani	1	0	0	4	0	5
8	FW	11	(France) Mathys Tel	4	0	0	0	0	4
8	FW	22	(Wales) Brennan Johnson	2	0	1	1	0	4
20	MF	20	(Ghana) Mohammed Kudus	2	0	0	1	0	3
11	MF	14	(England) Archie Gray	2	0	0	0	0	2
11	DF	23	(Spain) Pedro Porro	1	0	0	1	0	2
11	FW	28	(France) Wilson Odobert	0	1	0	1	0	2
11	MF	29	(Senegal) Pape Matar Sarr	2	0	0	0	0	2
15	MF	15	(Sweden) Lucas Bergvall	1	0	0	0	0	1
15	MF	22	(England) Conor Gallagher	1	0	0	0	0	1
15	MF	30	(Uruguay) Rodrigo Bentancur	1	0	0	0	0	1
15	DF	33	(Wales) Ben Davies	1	0	0	0	0	1
Totals				47	1	2	19	2	71

Source: Premier League

=== Disciplinary ===
The list is sorted by squad number when total cards are equal.

Rank	Pos.	No.	Player	Premier League			FA Cup			EFL Cup			Champions League			Super Cup			Total		
Rank	Pos.	No.	Player	Yellow card	(yellow card) (yellow-red card)	Red card	Yellow card	(yellow card) (yellow-red card)	Red card	Yellow card	(yellow card) (yellow-red card)	Red card	Yellow card	(yellow card) (yellow-red card)	Red card	Yellow card	(yellow card) (yellow-red card)	Red card	Yellow card	(yellow card) (yellow-red card)	Red card
1	DF	17	(Argentina) Cristian Romero	9	1	2	0	0	0	0	0	0	2	0	0	0	0	0	11	1	2
2	DF	37	(Netherlands) Micky van de Ven	9	0	1	0	0	0	0	0	0	3	0	0	0	0	0	12	0	1
3	DF	23	(Spain) Pedro Porro	10	0	0	1	0	0	1	0	0	2	0	0	0	0	0	14	0	0
4	MF	6	(Portugal) João Palhinha	8	0	0	1	0	0	1	0	0	2	0	0	0	0	0	12	0	0
5	DF	4	(Austria) Kevin Danso	8	0	0	0	0	0	0	0	0	1	0	0	1	0	0	10	0	0
5	FW	9	(Brazil) Richarlison	5	0	0	0	0	0	1	0	0	3	0	0	1	0	0	10	0	0
7	MF	7	(Netherlands) Xavi Simons	5	0	1	0	0	0	0	0	0	1	0	0	0	0	0	6	0	1
8	DF	14	(England) Archie Gray	4	0	0	1	0	0	0	0	0	2	0	0	0	0	0	7	0	0
8	MF	30	(Uruguay) Rodrigo Bentancur	7	0	0	0	0	0	0	0	0	0	0	0	0	0	0	7	0	0
10	DF	13	(Italy) Destiny Udogie	4	0	0	0	0	0	0	0	0	1	0	0	0	0	0	5	0	0
10	DF	24	(England) Djed Spence	4	0	0	0	0	0	0	0	0	1	0	0	0	0	0	5	0	0
10	FW	39	(France) Randal Kolo Muani	3	0	0	0	0	0	0	0	0	2	0	0	0	0	0	5	0	0
13	FW	20	(Ghana) Mohammed Kudus	3	0	0	0	0	0	1	0	0	0	0	0	0	0	0	4	0	0
14	GK	1	(Italy) Guglielmo Vicario	1	0	0	0	0	0	0	0	0	2	0	0	0	0	0	3	0	0
14	MF	8	(Mali) Yves Bissouma	3	0	0	0	0	0	0	0	0	0	0	0	0	0	0	3	0	0
14	MF	15	(Sweden) Lucas Bergvall	2	0	0	0	0	0	0	0	0	1	0	0	0	0	0	3	0	0
14	FW	22	(Wales) Brennan Johnson	2	0	0	0	0	0	0	0	0	0	0	1	0	0	0	2	0	1
14	MF	29	(Senegal) Pape Matar Sarr	3	0	0	0	0	0	0	0	0	0	0	0	0	0	0	3	0	0
19	MF	22	(England) Conor Gallagher	2	0	0	0	0	0	0	0	0	0	0	0	0	0	0	2	0	0
20	FW	11	(France) Mathys Tel	1	0	0	0	0	0	0	0	0	0	0	0	0	0	0	1	0	0
20	FW	19	(England) Dominic Solanke	1	0	0	0	0	0	0	0	0	0	0	0	0	0	0	1	0	0
20	GK	31	(Czech Republic) Antonín Kinský	1	0	0	0	0	0	0	0	0	0	0	0	0	0	0	1	0	0
20	DF	33	(Wales) Ben Davies	1	0	0	0	0	0	0	0	0	0	0	0	0	0	0	1	0	0
20	DF	38	(Brazil) Souza	1	0	0	0	0	0	0	0	0	0	0	0	0	0	0	1	0	0
Totals				97	1	2	3	0	0	4	0	0	23	0	1	2	0	0	129	1	5

Source: Premier League

=== Clean sheets ===
The list is sorted by squad number when total clean sheets are equal.

Rank	No.	Player	Premier League	FA Cup	EFL Cup	Champions League	Super Cup	Total
1	1	(Italy) Guglielmo Vicario	7	0	0	6	0	13
2	31	(Czech Republic) Antonín Kinský	2	0	1	0	0	3
Totals			9	0	1	6	0	16

Source: Premier League
