= Run-in =

Run-in may refer to:

In sports

- The tail-end of a team's regular season, the results of which may be crucial in deciding the team's playoff/promotion/relegation fate; this is often mentioned as such when a certain group of teams that rely on results face each other.

In professional wrestling

- "Run-In", a professional wrestling plot device

In medical research

- Run-in period, a period during a clinical trial where the subject receives no treatment.

In engineering

- Break-in (mechanical run-in), the operating of a new engine (especially that of a motor vehicle) at less than its normal speed until proper working has been established
