= Cristian Romero =

Argentine footballer (born 1998)

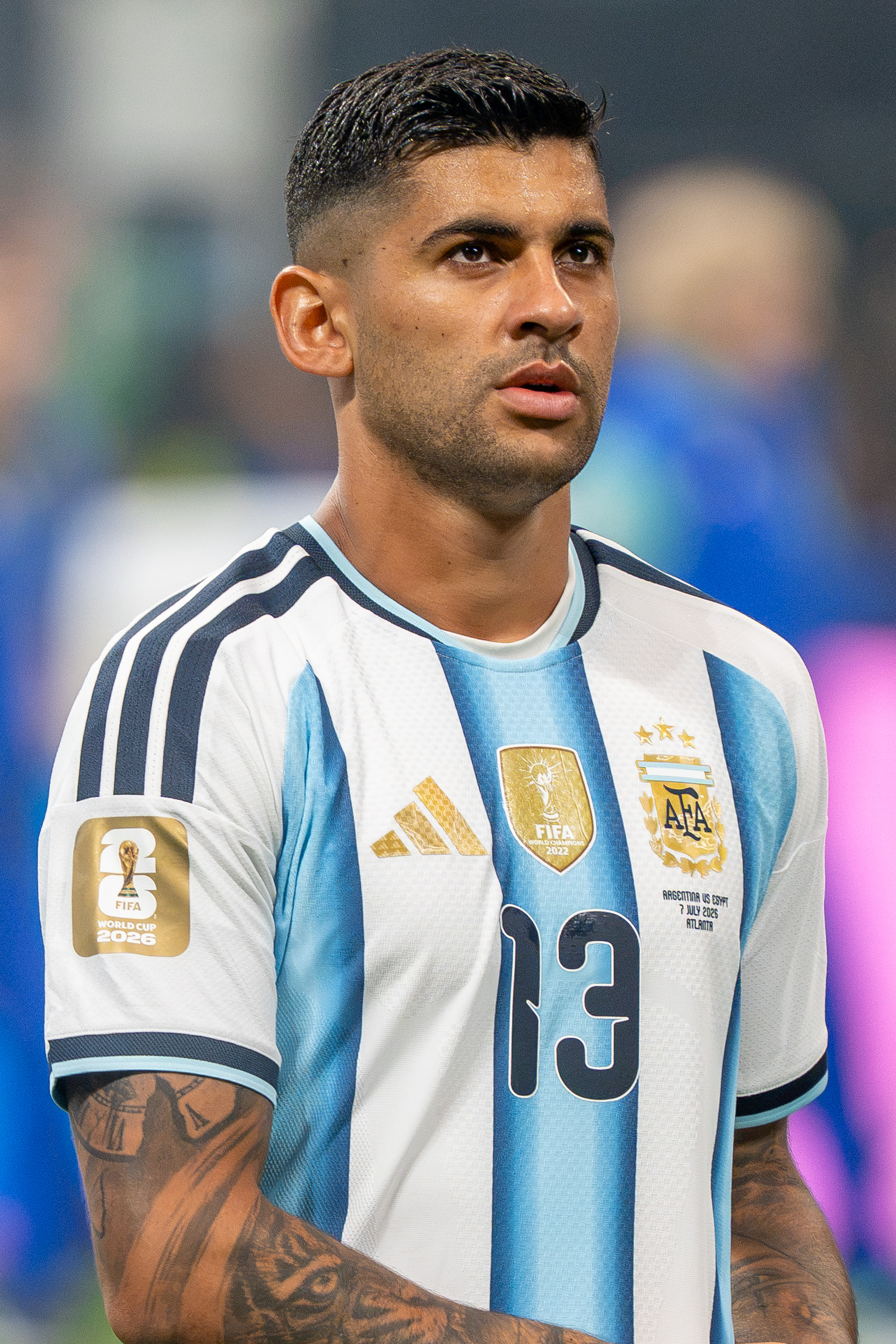
- Romero with Argentina in 2026

Personal information
- Full name: Cristian Gabriel Romero
- Date of birth: 27 April 1998 (age 28)
- Place of birth: Córdoba, Argentina
- Height: 1.85 m (6 ft 1 in)
- Position: Centre-back

Team information
- Current team: Atlético Madrid
- Number: 21

Youth career
- 2014–2016: Belgrano

Senior career*
Years	Team	Apps	(Gls)
2016–2018	Belgrano	16	(0)
2018–2019	Genoa	27	(2)
2019–2021	Juventus	0	(0)
2019–2020	→ Genoa (loan)	30	(1)
2020–2021	→ Atalanta (loan)	31	(2)
2021–2022	Atalanta	0	(0)
2021–2022	→ Tottenham Hotspur (loan)	22	(1)
2022–2026	Tottenham Hotspur	101	(10)
2026–	Atlético Madrid	6	(1)

International career^{‡}
2017	Argentina U20	7	(0)
2021–	Argentina	60	(5)
Medal record
Men's football
Representing Argentina
FIFA World Cup
Winner	2022 Qatar
Runner-up	2026 Canada–Mexico–US
Copa América
Winner	2021 Brazil
Winner	2024 United States
CONMEBOL–UEFA Cup of Champions
Winner	2022 England
- * Club domestic league appearances and goals as of 23:35, 17 October 2026 (UTC) ‡ National team caps and goals as of 3 October 2026

Cristian Gabriel "Cuti" Romero (born 27 April 1998) is an Argentine professional footballer who plays as a centre-back for La Liga club Atlético Madrid and captains the Argentina national team.

Coming through the youth system, Romero began his senior career in 2016 at Belgrano. He moved to Italy in 2018, playing for Genoa. Romero was purchased by Juventus the following season; he was sent back on loan to Genoa before being sent on loan to Atalanta in 2020. After being named Serie A's Best Defender for the 2020–21 season, the club exercised the option of purchase, before promptly loaning Romero to Tottenham Hotspur with an obligation to buy. After a successful loan spell, Romero was signed by Tottenham in 2022, and went on to win the 2024–25 UEFA Europa League.

Romero represented Argentina at the youth level at the 2017 South American U-20 Championship. He made his senior debut in 2021 and was a key member of the squads that won the 2021 Copa América, 2022 FIFA World Cup, and 2024 Copa América, also appearing in the 2026 FIFA World Cup, where Argentina reached runners-up in the final.

== Club career ==
=== Belgrano ===
Having joined the youth team in 2014, Romero was promoted to Argentine Primera División side Belgrano's first team in 2016; his debut came on 28 August, in a league match with Independiente. One month later, Romero played in both of Belgrano's 2016 Copa Sudamericana round of 16 draws against Coritiba. In two seasons with Belgrano's first-team, he made nineteen appearances in all competitions.

=== Genoa ===
In July 2018, Romero joined Genoa of Serie A. He scored his first senior goal in his second Genoa match, netting in a 2–2 draw with Udinese on 28 October, only to be sent off later.

=== Juventus ===
On 9 July 2019, Juventus announced Romero was having a medical ahead of a requested transfer.

==== Return to Genoa (loan) ====
On 12 July 2019, Juventus announced the permanent acquisition of Romero from Genoa for €26 million, with the player remaining at his former club on loan for the rest of the season.

=== Atalanta ===
On 5 September 2020, Romero joined Atalanta on loan until 30 June 2022 with an option to buy. He was elected the best defender of the 2020–21 Serie A season.

=== Tottenham Hotspur ===
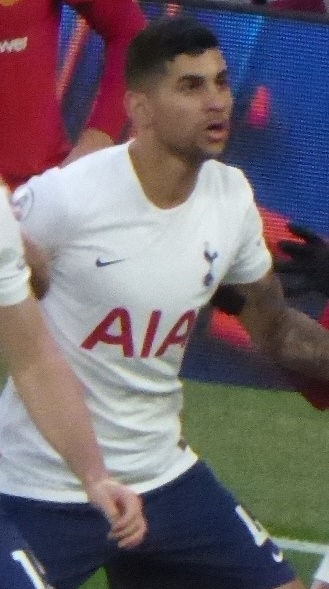
Romero with Spurs in March 2022

2021-22 Season: Start to life at Tottenham

On 6 August 2021, Juventus announced that Atalanta had activated the option to sign Romero for €16 million. Later that day, Premier League club Tottenham Hotspur announced his signing from Atalanta on an initial season-long loan with an option to make the deal permanent. Romero was given the number 4 shirt following the departure of Toby Alderweireld.

Romero debuted for the club on 15 August, coming on as a late substitute for Pierre-Emile Højbjerg in a match against Manchester City that Tottenham won 1–0. On 19 August 2021, he made his first start in the UEFA Europa Conference League first leg tie against Paços de Ferreira, which ended in a 1–0 defeat. He suffered an injury for Argentina against Brazil on 16 November, ruling him out for the rest of 2021.

He returned after over 2 months out, on 5 February 2022, starting in the 3-1 win over Brighton & Hove Albion, in the FA Cup. On 16 March, Romero scored his first goal for Tottenham in a 2–0 victory over Brighton & Hove Albion.

Romero was awarded Player of the Match in the 1-1 draw against Liverpool on 12 May, but also suffered another injury, this time a hip injury, keeping him out of the crucial game against Arsenal and the remainder of the season. Tottenham went on to finish 4th that season as Romero was labelled "Signing of the Season" by Jamie Carragher.

2022-23 Season: Suspension concerns

Ahead of the 2022–23 Premier League season, Romero changed his shirt number from 4 to 17, as it wasn't available in the summer he joined due to Moussa Sissoko occupying it. It's his favourite number, wearing it on his variety debut at Club Atlético Belgrano.

Tottenham faced rivals Chelsea on 14 August, in a fiery London derby that ended 2-2. Romero was involved amongst the controversy for pulling Marc Cucurella's hair in the corner before Harry Kane equalised. Mike Dean, who was the referee on VAR that day, later said he was wrong to not request an on-field review and Romero left unpunished.

On 18 December, Romero won the 2022 FIFA World Cup with Argentina defeating France and club captain Hugo Lloris in the final. Romero became only the third Tottenham player to win the FIFA World Cup.

On 5 February, Romero was sent off in the 1-0 win over Manchester City receiving 2 yellow cards. Romero served his one-match suspension as Tottenham were defeated 4-1 by Leicester City. Romero saw red again against AC Milan in the UEFA Champions League round of 16, accumulating 2 yellow cards, the second being a "wild" challenge on Théo Hernandez. Tottenham went on to get eliminated 1-0 on aggregate.

2023-24 Season: Vice captaincy

Ahead of the 2023–24 Premier League season, Romero was named as one of Tottenham's vice-captains.

On 13 August, he scored the first goal of the Ange Postecoglou era, the opener in a 2-2 draw against Brentford. He made a strong start to the season, being described by manager Ange Postecoglou as the "rock" in Tottenham's defence, and earning a nomination for the Player of the Month award in October.

On 6 November 2023, Romero was shown a straight red card during Tottenham's 4–1 loss to rivals Chelsea. It was his fourth red card since moving to the Premier League, more than any other player in that time. Romero scored on his return from suspension, Tottenham's only goal in a 2–1 loss to West Ham United.

On 28 April, Romero scored against Arsenal in a 3-2 North London derby defeat, his fifth goal of the season and fourth in London Derbies that year.

2024-25 Season: Europa league win and injury struggles

In the 2024-25 Premier League season he made his 100th appearance for Tottenham on 24 August, scoring in a 4-0 win over Everton.

Romero suffered a foot injury on international break for Argentina against Paraguay on 14 November, a problem he suffered against Aston Villa 2 weeks prior.

He came back nearly a month later on 8 December against rivals Chelsea, but had to come off after just 15 minutes due to a muscular injury, separate to the one that had kept him out before. He returned 3 months later vs AFC Bournemouth in a 2-2 draw on 9 March 2025 and snubbed the Tottenham medical team, giving full praise to the Argentina physios for his return out of a "bad moment".

A month after returning on 17 April, Romero captained Tottenham to a 1-0 win against Eintracht Frankfurt in the second-leg of the UEFA Europa League quarter-final, sending Tottenham to the Europa League semi-final.

Romero led Tottenham to a 3-1 home win vs FK Bodø/Glimt in the 1st leg of the UEFA Europa League semifinal, winning a penalty that was scored by Dominic Solanke. Tottenham won the 2nd away leg 2-0, sending them to their first UEFA Europa League final in 41 years, Romero was influential again, when his knockdown for Dominic Solanke broke the deadlock. Romero was praised for his leadership, positional awareness and composure throughout the game.

On 21 May, Romero captained Tottenham in the 2025 UEFA Europa League final, where they secured a 1–0 win against Manchester United. He was awarded Player of the Match for his "dominant" performance, winning his first club honour, Tottenham Hotspur's first major trophy in 17 years and their first European trophy in 41 years. He was also awarded UEFA Europa League Player of the Season. and was in the UEFA Europa League Team of the Season.

2025-26 Season: Captaincy controversy and availability issues

Ahead of the 2025–26 Premier League season, Romero was named Tottenham captain by new Spurs manager Thomas Frank after the departure of Son Heung-min. His first game as club captain was on 13 August in the 2025 UEFA Super Cup vs Paris Saint-Germain, Romero scored a header in the 48th minute to put his side 2-0 up. Tottenham conceded 2 late goals, forcing penalties where they eventually lost the final 4-3.Shortly after being named captain, he renewed his Tottenham contract until 2029.

On 23 November, accumulated his fifth yellow card in the 4-1 defeat against rivals Arsenal, which activated a 1 game suspension, meaning he missed the 2-1 defeat against Fulham on 29 November. On 2 December, Romero returned from suspension, scoring twice including a bicycle kick equaliser in stoppage time, in a 2–2 draw against Newcastle United.

On 20 December, Romero received a second yellow card as he was sent off during Tottenham's 2–1 loss to Liverpool for kicking at Ibrahima Konaté. He served his suspension as Tottenham beat Crystal Palace 1-0. On 9 January, Romero was handed further a one-game suspension and a £50,000 fine by the Independent Regulatory Commission for "acting improperly by failing to leave the pitch promptly and behaving in a confrontational and aggressive manner toward referee John Brooks" in the 2-1 loss to Liverpool after he was shown a red card, his one-game suspension was served in the FA Cup 3 round tie against Aston Villa where Tottenham lost 2-1. Romero scored on his return from suspension again, vs West Ham United in a 2-1 loss.

On 20 January, Romero scored his first UEFA Champions League goal for Tottenham in a 2-0 win against Borussia Dortmund. On 24 January, he scored a last minute equaliser against Burnley to draw 2-2, this was his third goal in as many games. 4 days later, on 28 January, Tottenham secured their place in the UEFA Champions League round of 16 with a 2-0 win over Eintracht Frankfurt, Romero setup the opener for Randal Kolo Muani and was awarded Player of the Match.

A second red card of the season for Romero came in a 2–0 loss to Manchester United on 7 February 2026, the red card would keep him out of the next 4 Premier League fixtures rather than 3 due to it being his second of the season. Tottenham lost all 4 games Romero missed through suspension. Romero's suspension ended and was available to play against Liverpool on 15 March, but due to a concussion he suffered after colliding heads with teammate João Palhinha against Atlético Madrid in the UEFA Champions League round of 16, his league return was delayed due to concussion protocols.

Throughout his time at Tottenham, Romero became known for outspoken comments in the media, criticising the club's leadership, particularly for their transfer strategy amidst multiple injury crises. He sustained a knee injury in a 1–0 away defeat against Sunderland on 12 April 2026, ruling him out for the remainder of the season. Controversy escalated further in May 2026 when Romero travelled to Argentina during Tottenham's survival fight, choosing to attend Belgrano's title-deciding clash against River Plate instead of remaining with Spurs for their crucial Premier League finale against Everton. However, he appeared at the Tottenham Hotspur Stadium before kick-off after widespread backlash over his trip.

=== Atlético Madrid ===
On 15 August 2026, Romero signed for La Liga club Atlético Madrid on a five-year contract. The transfer fee was reportedly £34.2 million. On 10 October, Romero scored his first goal for Atlético, a late winner in the 2-1 win over Deportivo Alavés.

== International career ==
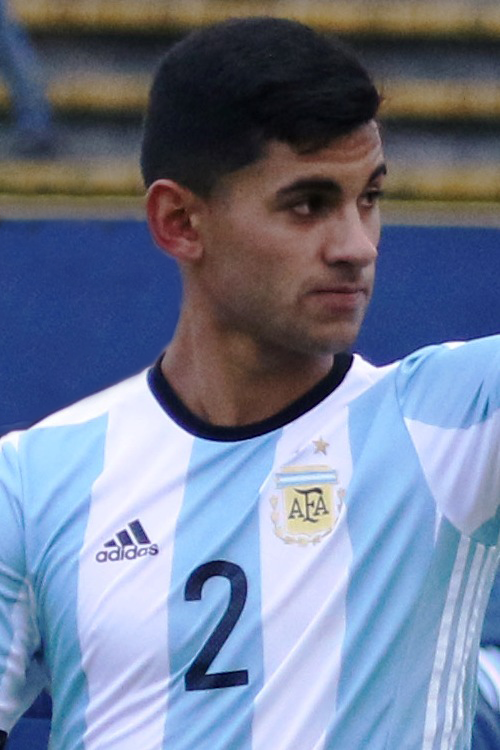
Romero with Argentina U20 in 2017

=== Youth ===
Romero has represented Argentina at the U20 level, winning seven caps at the 2017 South American U-20 Championship in Ecuador. In April 2017, he was called up for Argentina's training camp ahead of the 2017 FIFA U-20 World Cup in South Korea but was not selected on the tournament squad list. Romero was called up for the U23s in September 2019.

=== Senior ===
On 3 June 2021, Romero debuted for the senior national team a World Cup qualifier against Chile, playing the full match. In his second game for Argentina on 8 June, he scored his first international goal, coming from a thumping header against Colombia after only 130 seconds. This goal also broke the record for the fastest ever scored for Argentina in a professional match, surpassing Diego Maradona's goal after 168 seconds against Venezuela in 1985.

In June 2021, Romero was included in Lionel Scaloni's final Argentina 28-man squad for the 2021 Copa América and the Team of the Tournament at the end as Argentina won the competition. Romero was also an integral part of the Argentinian team which won the 2022 FIFA World Cup, in which he started in six out of seven matches including the final.

In June 2024, Romero was included in Scaloni's final 26-man Argentina squad for the 2024 Copa América.

On 27 May 2026, Romero was selected in the 26-man squad for the 2026 FIFA World Cup. On 7 July 2026, Romero scored his first World Cup goal in the round of 16 match against Egypt, netting in the 79th minute to spark a comeback as Argentina overturned a two-goal deficit to win 3–2.

Romero playing for Argentina at the 2026 FIFA World Cup final

On 15 July 2026, following Argentina's 2–1 victory over England in the 2026 FIFA World Cup semi-finals, Romero, who was then captain of English club Tottenham Hotspur, was one of several Argentina players who displayed a banner reading "Las Malvinas son Argentinas" ("The Falkland Islands are Argentine"). The display was criticised by the British government, which called for FIFA to investigate whether it breached tournament regulations prohibiting political messages by players.

== Style of play ==
Romero has been described as a "proactive" defender always playing on the "front foot." This allows him to step up in the backline and make crucial interceptions in midfield. He is well known for his decision-making in his risky style of play. Romero is also known for his exceptional ability in the air and is adept at scoring headers in the box.

== Career statistics ==
=== Club ===
As of match played 17 October 2026

Appearances and goals by club, season and competition
Club	Season	League			National cup (Note: Includes Copa Argentina, Coppa Italia, FA Cup and Copa del Rey)		League cup (Note: Includes EFL Cup)		Continental		Other		Total	
Club	Season	Division	Apps	Goals	Apps	Goals	Apps	Goals	Apps	Goals	Apps	Goals	Apps	Goals
Belgrano	2016–17	Argentine Primera División	13	0	0	0	—		2 (Note: Appearances in Copa Sudamericana)	0	—		15	0
Belgrano	2017–18	Argentine Primera División	3	0	1	0	—		0	0	—		4	0
Belgrano	Total		16	0	1	0	—		2	0	—		19	0
Genoa (loan)	2018–19	Serie A	27	2	0	0	—		—		—		27	2
Genoa (loan)	2019–20	Serie A	30	1	3	0	—		—		—		33	1
Genoa (loan)	Total		57	3	3	0	—		—		—		60	3
Atalanta (loan)	2020–21	Serie A	31	2	4	0	—		7 (Note: Appearances in UEFA Champions League)	1	—		42	3
Tottenham Hotspur (loan)	2021–22	Premier League	22	1	2	0	2	0	4 (Note: Appearances in UEFA Europa Conference League)	0	—		30	1
Tottenham Hotspur	2022–23	Premier League	27	0	0	0	0	0	7	0	—		34	0
Tottenham Hotspur	2023–24	Premier League	33	5	1	0	0	0	—		—		34	5
Tottenham Hotspur	2024–25	Premier League	18	1	0	0	1	0	7 (Note: Appearances in UEFA Europa League)	0	—		26	1
Tottenham Hotspur	2025–26	Premier League	23	4	0	0	0	0	8	1	1 (Note: Appearance in UEFA Super Cup)	1	32	6
Tottenham Hotspur	Tottenham total		123	11	3	0	3	0	26	1	1	1	156	13
Atlético Madrid	2026–27	La Liga	6	1	0	0	—		2	0	0	0	8	1
Career total			233	17	11	0	3	0	37	2	1	1	285	20

=== International ===
As of match played 3 October 2026

Appearances and goals by national team and year
National team	Year	Apps	Goals
Argentina	2021	10	1
Argentina	2022	9	0
Argentina	2023	9	1
Argentina	2024	12	1
Argentina	2025	7	0
Argentina	2026	13	2
Total		60	5

Scores and results list Argentina's goal tally first, score column indicates score after each Romero goal.

List of international goals scored by Cristian Romero
No.	Date	Venue	Cap	Opponent	Score	Result	Competition
1	8 June 2021	Estadio Metropolitano Roberto Meléndez, Barranquilla, Colombia	2	Colombia	1–0	2–2	2022 FIFA World Cup qualification
2	19 June 2023	Gelora Bung Karno Stadium, Jakarta, Indonesia	22	Indonesia	2–0	2–0	Friendly
3	22 March 2024	Lincoln Financial Field, Philadelphia, United States	29	El Salvador	1–0	3–0	Friendly
4	7 July 2026	Mercedes-Benz Stadium, Atlanta, United States	55	Egypt	1–2	3–2	2026 FIFA World Cup
5	30 September 2026	Estadio Mario Alberto Kempes, Córdoba, Argentina	59	Bolivia	3–0	4–0	Friendly

== Honours ==
Tottenham Hotspur

- UEFA Europa League: 2024–25

Argentina

- FIFA World Cup: 2022
- Copa América: 2021, 2024
- CONMEBOL–UEFA Cup of Champions: 2022

Individual

- Serie A Best Defender: 2020–21
- Copa América Team of the Tournament: 2021, 2024
- IFFHS Top 11 Copa América: 2024
- IFFHS Men's CONMEBOL Team: 2021, 2022, 2023, 2024
- UEFA Europa League Player of the Season: 2024–25
- UEFA Europa League Team of the Season: 2024–25
