= List of Collins GEM books =

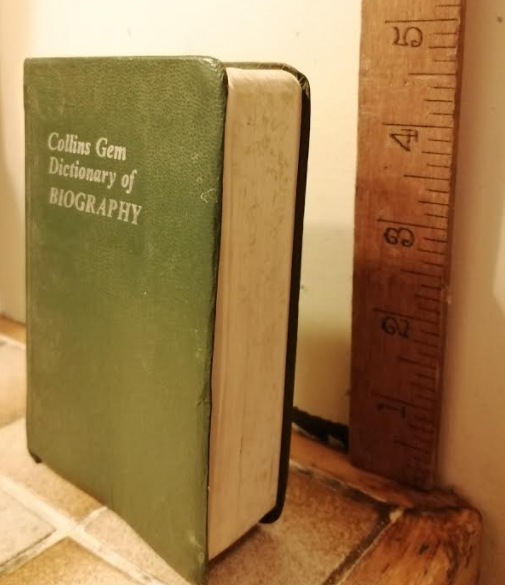
Collins Gem Dictionary of Biography (1971)

Collins GEM is a collection of miniature books and dictionaries by HarperCollins. The original Collins firm published its first dictionary in the year 1824, and its first series of Collins Illustrated Dictionaries in 1840, including the Sixpenny Pocket Pronouncing Dictionary, which sold approximately 1 million copies. With the invention of steam presses in the 1860s, Collins became able to publish books and dictionaries in all sizes.

The precursor of the Gem format (four inches high and two-and-a-half wide) was the Collins Gem Diary, which became popular in the 1880s. The first Collins Gem English Dictionary was published in the late 1890s. Shortly afterwards came the Collins Gem Pocket Pronouncing Dictionary of 1902. These were followed by foreign language editions, travel and reference guides.

Titles issued during the 1960s and 1970s (ranging beyond the staple language dictionaries) included the Dictionary of the Bible (1964), Decimal Gem Reckoner (1966), Dictionary of Biography (1971), and Gazetteer of the World (1973). Others covered quotations, first names, synonyms and antonyms, spelling and word division, and crossword puzzles. Collins also issued a related series of "Nutshell Books" during the 1960s in a larger format, a response to the successful Teach Yourself series by rival publishers Hodder & Stoughton.

In the 1980s Collins Gem guides were updated and expanded with extensive colour illustrations. There was a further modernisation and re-design in the Spring of 2004, including a new cover design, new internal layouts and a size increase to 4.6 high by 3.2 inches wide. It is still an active imprint.

This is a list of recent titles in the Gem collection. Authors are not always credited by the publisher.

== Guidebooks ==
- 10-minute Watercolours by Hazel Soan
- 100 Ways to Boost Your Energy by Theresa Cheung
- 100 Ways to Boost Your Immune System by Theresa Cheung
- 48-hour Detox by Gill Paul
- 15-minute Yoga by Chrissie Gallagher-Mundy
- 5-minute Back Relief by the Royal College of General Practitioners
- 5-minute Memory Workout by Sean Callery
- 5-minute NLP by Carolyn Boyes
- 5-minute Stress-busting by Vicky Hales-Dutton
- Ancient Egypt by David Pickering
- Ancient Greece by David Pickering
- Ancient Rome by David Pickering
- Antique Marks
- Architectural Plants by Christine Shaw
- Architecture by Timothy Brittain-Catlin
- Babies' Names by Julia Cresswell
- Beer by Ronald Atkins
- Bible Guide by Raymond Brown
- Birds by Jim Flegg
- Body Language by MR David Lambert and Diagram Group
- Book of Facts
- Butterflies by Michael Chinery
- Calorie Counter
- Carb Counter
- Card Games
- Card Tricks
- Car Basics by Kevin Elliott
- Cats by Deborah Gill
- Children's Party Games
- Chinese Astrology by Bernard Lodge
- Cholesterol Counter by Kate Santon
- Clans and Tartans by Robert Bain
- Classic Albums by Robert Dimery
- Classic Books by Edwin Moore
- Classic Films by Simon Rose
- Classic Singles by Robert Dimery.
- Classic TV Series
- Cocktails
- Codes and Ciphers
- Collecting China
- Collecting Stamps
- Cricket by Jeff Fletcher
- Decade Series
  - 1950s
  - 1960s
  - 1970s
  - 1980s
- Diet and Exercise by Mary Clark
- Dieting
- Digital Video by Colin Barrett
- Dinosaurs by Douglas Palmer
- Disaster Survival
- Dogs
- Dog Training by Gwen Bailey
- Fact File
- Feng Shui by Richard Craze
- Film Stars by Bob McCabe
- First Aid by R M Youngson
- Firsts
- Fish by Michael Prichard
- Flags by Edwin Moore and David Ross
- Flowering Shrubs by Keith D. Rushforth
- Food for Free by Richard Mabey
- Fossils by Douglas Palmer
- Garden Birds by Stephen Moss
- Garden Flowers
- Garden Ponds
- Garden Wildlife by Michael Chinery
- Gemstones by Cally Oldershaw
- GI (Glycemic index diet)
- GL (Glycaemic load diet)
- Golf
- Golf Tips by Heather Thomas and Rolando Ugolini
- Healthy Eating
- Herbs and Spices by Nicola Woods
- Hillwalker's Survival Guide by Barrie Davies
- Home Emergency Guide
- Horses and Ponies by Deborah Gill
- Insects by Michael Chinery
- Internet by Alex Gray
- Jane's Gems
  - Aircraft of World War II by Geoffrey L. Ethell
  - Civil Aircraft by Richard Aboulafia
  - Combat Aircraft by Bob Munro
  - Tanks of World War II by Terry J Gander
  - Warships of World War II by Bernard Ireland
- Kings and Queens by Neil Grant
- Knots by Trevor Bounford
- Mushrooms and Toadstools by Patrick Harding
- Origami by Trevor Bounford
- Palm Reading by Bridget Giles and Jane Johnson
- Party Games by The Diagram Group
- Psychic Powers by Carolyn Boyes
- Pilates by Yvonne Worth
- Pirates by David Pickering
- Predicting by The Diagram Group
- Quotations
- Ready Reference
- Reflexology by Nicola Hall
- Royal Britain
- SAS Self Defence by Barry Davies
- SAS Survival Guide by John 'Lofty' Wiseman
- Scottish Birds by Valerie Thom
- Scrabble
- Seashore by Ken Preston-Mafham
- Sharks by Leonard Compagno
- Science Basic Facts
- Sketching by Jackie Simmonds
- Snakes by Christopher Mattison
- Spiders by Paul Hillyard
- Stars by Ian Ridpath
- Stress Survival Guide
- Superstitions by Carol P Shaw
- Tarot by Rowena Stuart
- Trees by Alastair H. Fitter
- Understanding Dreams
- Universe by Pam Spence
- Using Your Software by Richard Pickvance
- Watercolour Tips by Ian King
- Weather by Storm Dunlop
- Weddings
- What Diet? by Mary Clark
- Where on Earth?
- Whisky by Carol P. Shaw
- Wild Animals by John A. Burton
- Wild Flowers by Martin Walters
- Wine Guide by Julie Arkell
- World Atlas
- Word Processing by Marjorie Lazaro
- Yoga by Patricia A Ralston and Caroline Smart
- Your PC by Richard Pickvance
- Zodiac Types
- Zoo Animals

== Dictionaries ==
- Arabic
- Bangla (Bengali)
- Canadian English
- Español-Chino
- French
- French verb tables
- German
- Greek (Modern)
- Gujarati
- Hindi
- Irish
- Italian
- Japanese
- Korean
- Latin
- Malay
- Malayalam
- Mandarin Chinese
- Marathi
- Oriya
- Polish
- Portuguese
- Russian
- Scots
- Spanish
- Tamil
- Telugu
- Thai
- Turkish
- Vietnamese
- Welsh

== See also ==
- HarperCollins
- John Wiseman
