= 2024–25 Tottenham Hotspur F.C. season =

English football club season

Tottenham Hotspur
2024–25 season
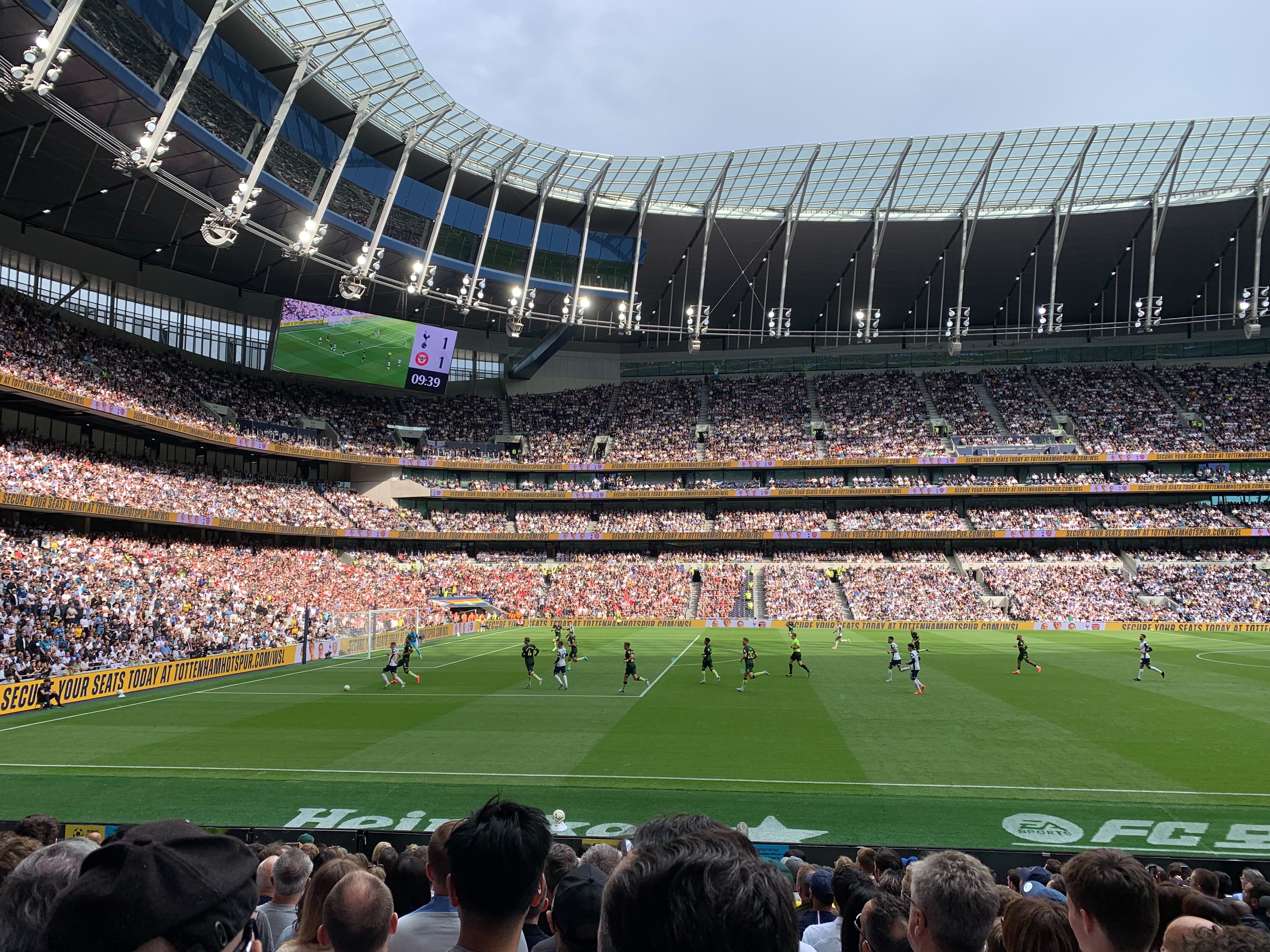
- A Premier League home match between Tottenham and Brentford, 21 September 2024
- Owner: ENIC International Ltd.
- Chairman: Daniel Levy
- Head coach: Ange Postecoglou
- Stadium: Tottenham Hotspur Stadium
- Premier League: 17th
- FA Cup: Fourth round
- EFL Cup: Semi-finals
- UEFA Europa League: Winners
- Top goalscorer: League: Brennan Johnson (11); All: Brennan Johnson (18)
- Highest home attendance: 61,645 v Arsenal; 15 September 2024, Premier League
- Lowest home attendance: 51,757 v Qarabağ; 26 September 2024, Europa League
- Average home league attendance: 61,127
- Biggest win: 5–0 v Southampton (A); 15 December 2024, Premier League
- Biggest defeat: 0–4 v Liverpool (A), 6 February 2025, EFL Cup; 1–5 v Liverpool (A), 27 April 2025, Premier League
Home colours	Away colours	Third colours

The 2024–25 season was the 143rd in the history of Tottenham Hotspur Football Club, the club's 47th consecutive season in the top flight of English football and the 33rd consecutive season in the Premier League. In addition to the domestic league, the club participated in the FA Cup and the EFL Cup. Having finished fifth in the table the previous season, Spurs also qualified for the UEFA Europa League.

On 21 May 2025, Spurs secured a 1–0 victory over fellow Premier League side Manchester United in the UEFA Europa League final, clinching their first major trophy in 17 years since the 2008 League Cup. The decisive goal came in the 42nd minute when Brennan Johnson redirected a cross from Pape Matar Sarr, with the ball deflecting off United defender Luke Shaw before entering the net. The goal, officially credited to Johnson, made him the first Welshman to score in a Europa League final since Fulham's Simon Davies in 2010. The match, held at San Mamés Stadium in Bilbao, Spain, marked Spurs' first European title in 41 years and secured their qualification for the 2025–26 UEFA Champions League.

The European success came in stark contrast to the club's domestic performance. Spurs finished 17th in the Premier League with just 38 points, their lowest top-flight finish in 48 years since the 1976–77 season. They avoided relegation by one place and 13 points, only above Leicester City, Ipswich Town and Southampton, all of whom were relegated to the Championship. With just 38 points, the club also set a new record low points tally for the Premier League era, eclipsing the previous record low set in the 1997–98 season. The disparity between their Europa League triumph and their struggles in the league drew significant attention, marking the season as both a historic success and a major disappointment. Ange Postecoglou was eventually sacked on 6 June 2025 with a club statement citing the teams' poor overall Premier League performance during the season as one of the key factors behind the decision to make a managerial change.

== Squad information ==
As of 3 February 2025

No.	Player	Nationality	Position(s)	Date of birth (age)
Goalkeepers
1	Guglielmo Vicario	(Italy)	GK	7 October 1996 (aged 28)
20	Fraser Forster	(England)	GK	17 March 1988 (aged 37)
31	Antonín Kinský	(Czech Republic)	GK	13 March 2003 (aged 22)
40	Brandon Austin	(United States)	GK	7 January 1999 (aged 26)
41	Alfie Whiteman	(England)	GK	2 October 1998 (aged 26)
Defenders
3	Sergio Reguilón	(Spain)	LWB / LB	16 December 1996 (aged 28)
4	Kevin Danso	(Austria)	CB	19 September 1998 (aged 26)
6	Radu Drăgușin	(Romania)	CB	3 February 2002 (aged 23)
13	Destiny Udogie	(Italy)	LWB / LB	28 November 2002 (aged 22)
17	Cristian Romero (VC)	(Argentina)	CB	27 April 1998 (aged 27)
23	Pedro Porro	(Spain)	RWB / RB	13 September 1999 (aged 25)
24	Djed Spence	(England)	RWB / RB	9 August 2000 (aged 24)
33	Ben Davies	(Wales)	CB / LB	24 April 1993 (aged 32)
37	Micky van de Ven	(Netherlands)	CB / LB	19 April 2001 (aged 24)
Midfielders
8	Yves Bissouma	(Mali)	DM / CM	30 August 1996 (aged 28)
10	James Maddison (VC)	(England)	AM / RW	23 November 1996 (aged 28)
14	Archie Gray	(England)	DM / CM	12 March 2006 (aged 19)
15	Lucas Bergvall	(Sweden)	CM / AM	2 February 2006 (aged 19)
21	Dejan Kulusevski	(Sweden)	AM / RW	25 April 2000 (aged 25)
29	Pape Matar Sarr	(Senegal)	CM	14 September 2002 (aged 22)
30	Rodrigo Bentancur	(Uruguay)	DM / CM	25 June 1997 (aged 28)
Forwards
7	Son Heung-min (C)	(South Korea)	LW / ST	8 July 1992 (aged 32)
9	Richarlison	(Brazil)	ST / LW	10 April 1997 (aged 28)
11	Mathys Tel	(France)	FW / LW	27 April 2005 (aged 20)
16	Timo Werner	(Germany)	LW / ST	6 March 1996 (aged 29)
19	Dominic Solanke	(England)	ST	14 September 1997 (aged 27)
22	Brennan Johnson	(Wales)	RW	23 May 2001 (aged 24)
28	Wilson Odobert	(France)	LW / RW	28 November 2004 (aged 20)
44	Dane Scarlett	(England)	ST	24 March 2004 (aged 21)
Out on loan
5	Pierre-Emile Højbjerg	(Denmark)	DM / CM	5 August 1995 (aged 29)
18	Yang Min-hyeok	(South Korea)	RW	16 April 2006 (aged 19)
27	Manor Solomon	(Israel)	LW / RW	24 July 1999 (aged 25)
36	Alejo Véliz	(Argentina)	ST	19 September 2003 (aged 21)
35	Ashley Phillips	(England)	CB	26 June 2005 (aged 20)
45	Alfie Devine	(England)	CM / AM	11 August 2004 (aged 20)
—N/a	Bryan Gil	(Spain)	LW / RW / AM	11 February 2001 (aged 24)

Last updated: 20 January 2025.
Source: Tottenham Hotspur

== Transfers and contracts ==
=== Released ===
Date from	Pos.	Nationality	Player	Subsequent club	Notes	Ref.
30 June 2024	CB	(England)	Eric Dier	(Germany) Bayern Munich	End of contract	
30 June 2024	CM	(England)	Billy Heaps	(England) Hitchin Town	End of contract	
30 June 2024	DM	(England)	Kieran Morgan	(England) Queens Park Rangers	End of contract	
30 June 2024	CM	(France)	Tanguy Ndombele	(France) Nice	Mutual termination	
30 June 2024	LM	(Croatia)	Ivan Perišić	(Croatia) Hajduk Split	End of contract	
30 June 2024	LB	(England)	Charlie Sayers	(Scotland) Partick Thistle	End of contract	
30 June 2024	LM	(England)	Ryan Sessegnon	(England) Fulham	End of contract	
30 June 2024	CB	(England)	Japhet Tanganga	(England) Millwall	End of contract	
30 June 2024	CM	(England)	Han Willhoft-King	(England) Manchester City	End of contract	

=== In ===
Date from	Pos.	Nationality	Player	From	Fee	Ref.
1 July 2024	CM	(Sweden)	Lucas Bergvall	(Sweden) Djurgården	£8,500,000	(Note: Bergvall's transfer was announced on 2 February 2024 and his contract commenced on 1 July 2024.)
2 July 2024	CM	(England)	Archie Gray	(England) Leeds United	£40,000,000	
5 July 2024	CF	(Wales)	George Feeney	(Northern Ireland) Glentoran	Undisclosed	
10 August 2024	ST	(England)	Dominic Solanke	(England) Bournemouth	£65,000,000	
16 August 2024	LW	(France)	Wilson Odobert	(England) Burnley	£25,000,000	
1 January 2025	RW	(South Korea)	Yang Min-hyeok	(South Korea) Gangwon	Undisclosed	(Note: Yang's transfer was announced on 28 July 2024 and his contract commenced on 1 January 2025.)
5 January 2025	GK	(Czech Republic)	Antonín Kinský	(Czech Republic) Slavia Prague	£12,500,000	
4 February 2025	MF	(England)	Reiss-Alexander Russell-Denny	(England) Chelsea	Free	
4 February 2025	MF	(England)	Dan Batty	(England) Manchester City	Free	
4 February 2025	DF	(England)	Luca Furnell-Gill	(England) Liverpool	Free	

=== Out ===
Date from	Pos.	Nationality	Player	To	Fee	Ref.
2 July 2024	CB	(Wales)	Joe Rodon	(England) Leeds United	£10,000,000	
13 July 2024	CF	(Republic of Ireland)	Troy Parrott	(Netherlands) AZ	Undisclosed	
30 July 2024	MF	(Spain)	Yago Santiago	(Spain) Elche	Undisclosed	
6 August 2024	MF	(England)	Nile John	(Portugal) Feirense	Undisclosed	
12 August 2024	RB	(Brazil)	Emerson Royal	(Italy) AC Milan	£12,800,000	
19 August 2024	MF	(England)	Oliver Skipp	(England) Leicester City	£20,000,000	
22 August 2024	MF	(England)	Jude Soonsup-Bell	(Spain) Córdoba	Undisclosed	
30 August 2024	MF	(Argentina)	Giovani Lo Celso	(Spain) Real Betis	£8,400,000	

=== Loaned in ===
Date from	Pos.	Nationality	Player	From	Date until	Ref.
28 May 2024	CF	(Germany)	Timo Werner	(Germany) RB Leipzig	End of season	
2 February 2025	CB	(Austria)	Kevin Danso	(France) Lens	End of season	
3 February 2025	FW	(France)	Mathys Tel	(Germany) Bayern Munich	End of season	

=== Loaned out ===
Date from	Pos.	Nationality	Player	To	Date until	Ref.
22 July 2024	CM	(Scotland)	Matthew Craig	(England) Barnsley	9 January 2025 (Note: On 9 January, Craig was recalled from his loan at Barnsley and subsequently joined Mansfield on loan)	
22 July 2024	CM	(Denmark)	Pierre-Emile Højbjerg	(France) Marseille	End of season	
29 July 2024	LW	(Spain)	Bryan Gil	(Spain) Girona	End of season	
5 August 2024	GK	(England)	Carey Bloedorn	(England) Aveley	End of season	
7 August 2024	CF	(Argentina)	Alejo Véliz	(Spain) Espanyol	End of season	
12 August 2024	CF	(England)	Dane Scarlett	(England) Oxford United	20 January 2025 (Note: On 20 January, Scarlett was recalled from his loan at Oxford)	
16 August 2024	CF	(England)	Jamie Donley	(England) Leyton Orient	End of season	
23 August 2024	CB	(England)	Ashley Phillips	(England) Stoke City	End of season	
27 August 2024	LW	(Israel)	Manor Solomon	(England) Leeds United	End of season	
29 August 2024	RB	(England)	George Abbott	(England) Notts County	End of season	
30 August 2024	GK	(Republic of Ireland)	Josh Keeley	(England) Leyton Orient	End of season	
5 September 2024	CM	(England)	Alfie Devine	(Belgium) Westerlo	End of season	
9 January 2025	DM	(Scotland)	Matthew Craig	(England) Mansfield Town	End of season	
13 January 2025	CB	(England)	Alfie Dorrington	(Scotland) Aberdeen	End of season	
24 January 2025	GK	(England)	Luca Gunter	(England) Wealdstone	End of season	
29 January 2025	RW	(South Korea)	Yang Min-hyeok	(England) Queens Park Rangers	End of season	
31 January 2025	CF	(England)	Will Lankshear	(England) West Bromwich Albion	End of season	

== Pre-season and friendlies ==
On 27 March, Tottenham announced their first pre-season friendly, against six-time European champions Bayern Munich as part of the "Visit Malta Cup". A first trip to Japan for 33 years was later confirmed, with a friendly against Vissel Kobe as part of the J.League World Challenge. In May, Spurs confirmed they would also travel to South Korea as part of its pre-season tour of Asia, to compete in the Coupang Play Series 2024 against Bayern Munich. Before the forementioned tours, an away fixture against Queens Park Rangers was added to the schedule. On 29 May, a fifth pre-season friendly was confirmed, against Heart of Midlothian. All of these friendlies, however, were preceded by a behind closed doors friendly, in which Spurs defeated Cambridge United 7–2, in a game that was played at the team's Hotspur Way training complex.

Win Draw Loss Fixtures

17 July 2024 Friendly	Heart of Midlothian	1–5	Tottenham Hotspur	Edinburgh, Scotland
19:00 BST	Shankland 46'	Report	Johnson 39'; Lankshear 55'; Moore 66'; Spence 72'; Neilson 85' (o.g.)	Stadium: Tynecastle Park; Attendance: 15,646; Referee: Matthew MacDermid (Scotland)

20 July 2024 Friendly	Queens Park Rangers	0–2	Tottenham Hotspur	White City
15:00 BST		Report	Bissouma 40'; Scarlett 87'	Stadium: Loftus Road; Attendance: 17,000; Referee: Gavin Ward

27 July 2024 J.League World Challenge	Vissel Kobe	2–3	Tottenham Hotspur	Tokyo, Japan
19:00 JST	Osako 10'; Kikuchi (yellow card) 27'; Jean Patric 64'	Report	Porro 16'; Son Heung-min 47'; Phillips (yellow card) 76'; Moore 86'	Stadium: Japan National Stadium; Attendance: 54,255; Referee: Futoshi Nakamura (Japan)

31 July 2024 Friendly	Team K League	3–4	Tottenham Hotspur	Seoul, South Korea
20:00 KST	Iljutcenko 52', 54'; Oberdan 81'; Oliveira (yellow card) 87'	Report	Kulusevski 29'; Son Heung-min 38', 45+2'; Lankshear 67'	Stadium: Seoul World Cup Stadium; Attendance: 63,395; Referee: Kim Jong-hyeok (South Korea)

3 August 2024 Coupang Play Series	Bayern Munich	2–1	Tottenham Hotspur	Seoul, South Korea
20:00 KST	Vidović 4'; Goretzka (yellow card) 50', (goal) 56'	Report	Spence (yellow card) 42'; Porro 65'	Stadium: Seoul World Cup Stadium; Attendance: 63,496; Referee: Kim Dae-yong (South Korea)

10 August 2024 Visit Malta Cup	Tottenham Hotspur	2–3	Bayern Munich	Tottenham
17:30 BST	Kulusevski 1', 61'; Drăgușin (yellow card) 44'; Lankshear (yellow card) 90+2'	Report	Upamecano 16'; Gnabry 31'; Müller 44'; Dier (yellow card) 77'; Coman (yellow card) 90+3'	Stadium: Tottenham Hotspur Stadium; Attendance: 61,084; Referee: Chris Kavanagh (England)

== Competitions ==
=== Overview ===
Competition	First match	Last match	Starting round	Final position	Record							
Competition	First match	Last match	Starting round	Final position	Pld	W	D	L	GF	GA	GD	Win %
Premier League	19 August 2024	25 May 2025	Matchday 1	17th	38	11	5	22	64	65	−1	28.95
FA Cup	12 January 2025	9 February 2025	Third round	Fourth round	2	1	0	1	4	2	+2	50.00
EFL Cup	18 September 2024	6 February 2025	Third round	Semi-finals	5	4	0	1	9	9	+0	80.00
UEFA Europa League	26 September 2024	21 May 2025	League phase	Winners	15	10	3	2	28	13	+15	66.67
Total					60	26	8	26	105	89	+16	43.33

Source: Soccerway

=== Premier League ===
==== League table ====
Pos	Team	Pld	W	D	L	GF	GA	GD	Pts	Qualification or relegation
15	Manchester United	38	11	9	18	44	54	−10	42	
16	Wolverhampton Wanderers	38	12	6	20	54	69	−15	42	
17	Tottenham Hotspur	38	11	5	22	64	65	−1	38	Qualification for the Champions League league phase (Note: Tottenham Hotspur qualified for the Champions League league phase as the 2024–25 UEFA Europa League winners.)
18	Leicester City (R)	38	6	7	25	33	80	−47	25	Relegation to EFL Championship
19	Ipswich Town (R)	38	4	10	24	36	82	−46	22	Relegation to EFL Championship

Source: Premier League
Rules for classification: 1) Points; 2) Goal difference; 3) Goals scored; 4) If the champions, relegated teams or qualified teams for UEFA competitions cannot be determined by rules 1 to 3, rules 4.1 to 4.3 are applied – 4.1) Points gained in head-to-head record between such teams; 4.2) Away goals scored in head-to-head record between such teams; 4.3) Play-offs
(R) Relegated

==== Results summary ====
Overall								Home						Away					
Pld	W	D	L	GF	GA	GD	Pts	W	D	L	GF	GA	GD	W	D	L	GF	GA	GD
38	11	5	22	64	65	−1	38	6	3	10	35	35	0	5	2	12	29	30	−1

Source: Soccerway

==== Results by round ====
Round	1	2	3	4	5	6	7	8	9	10	11	12	13	14	15	16	17	18	19	20	21	22	23	24	25	26	27	28	29	30	31	32	33	34	35	36	37	38
Ground	A	H	A	H	H	A	A	H	A	H	H	A	H	A	H	A	H	A	H	H	A	A	H	A	H	A	H	H	A	A	H	A	H	A	A	H	A	H
Result	D	W	L	L	W	W	L	W	L	W	L	W	D	L	L	W	L	L	D	L	L	L	L	W	W	W	L	D	L	L	W	L	L	L	D	L	L	L
Position	12	5	10	13	10	8	9	7	8	7	10	6	7	10	11	10	11	12	11	12	14	15	15	14	12	12	13	13	14	14	14	15	16	16	16	17	17	17
Points	1	4	4	4	7	10	10	13	13	16	16	19	20	20	20	23	23	23	24	24	24	24	24	27	30	33	33	34	34	34	37	37	37	37	38	38	38	38

Source: Soccerway
A = Away; H = Home; W = Win; D = Draw; L = Loss; P = Postponed

==== Matches ====
On 18 June 2024, the Premier League fixtures were released.

Win Draw Loss Fixtures

19 August 2024 1	Leicester City	1–1	Tottenham Hotspur	Leicester
20:00 BST	Vardy 57'; Faes (yellow card) 90+9'	Report	Porro 29'; Bentancur (yellow card) 64'	Stadium: King Power Stadium; Attendance: 31,977; Referee: Chris Kavanagh
Note: Live on Sky Sports

24 August 2024 2	Tottenham Hotspur	4–0	Everton	Tottenham
15:00 BST	Bissouma 14'; Son Heung-min 25', 77'; Romero 71'	Report		Stadium: Tottenham Hotspur Stadium; Attendance: 61,357; Referee: Anthony Taylor

1 September 2024 3	Newcastle United	2–1	Tottenham Hotspur	Newcastle upon Tyne
13:30 BST	Kelly (yellow card) 28'; Barnes 37'; Longstaff (yellow card) 41'; Joelinton (yellow card) 45+2'; Bruno Guimarães (yellow card) 58'; Isak 78'	Report	Sarr (yellow card) 34'; Bissouma (yellow card) 48'; Burn 56' (o.g.); Maddison (yellow card) 68'; Bentancur (yellow card) 84'	Stadium: St James' Park; Attendance: 52,211; Referee: Robert Jones
Note: Fixture was initially scheduled for 31 August, but was moved for live Sky Sports broadcast.

15 September 2024 4	Tottenham Hotspur	0–1	Arsenal	Tottenham
14:00 BST	Udogie (yellow card) 27'; Bentancur (yellow card) 32'; Vicario (yellow card) 37'; Van de Ven (yellow card) 45+2'; Kulusevski (yellow card) 45+2'	Report	Saliba (yellow card) 15'; Timber (yellow card) 35'; Jorginho (yellow card) 49'; Gabriel 64'	Stadium: Tottenham Hotspur Stadium; Attendance: 61,645; Referee: Jarred Gillett
Note: Fixture was initially scheduled for 14 September, but was moved for live Sky Sports broadcast.

21 September 2024 5	Tottenham Hotspur	3–1	Brentford	Tottenham
15:00 BST	Solanke 8'; Johnson 28'; Van de Ven (yellow card) 39'; Bissouma (yellow card) 66'; Maddison 85', (yellow card) 86'	Report	Mbeumo 1'; Ajer (yellow card) 58'	Stadium: Tottenham Hotspur Stadium; Attendance: 61,246; Referee: John Brooks

29 September 2024 6	Manchester United	0–3	Tottenham Hotspur	Trafford
16:30 BST	Mazraoui (yellow card) 34'; Dalot (yellow card) 39'; Fernandes (red card) 42'; Mount (yellow card) 45+4'; Martínez (yellow card) 55'; Ugarte (yellow card) 65'	Report	Johnson 3', (yellow card) 45+1'; Kulusevski 47'; Spence (yellow card) 54'; Porro (yellow card) 73'; Solanke 77'	Stadium: Old Trafford; Attendance: 73,587; Referee: Chris Kavanagh
Note: Fixture was initially scheduled for 28 September, but was moved for live Sky Sports broadcast.

6 October 2024 7	Brighton & Hove Albion	3–2	Tottenham Hotspur	Brighton and Hove
16:30 BST	Igor (yellow card) 34'; Minteh 48'; Rutter 58'; Welbeck 66'; Verbruggen (yellow card) 80'	Report	Johnson 23'; Maddison 37'; Udogie (yellow card) 67'; Kulusevski (yellow card) 69'	Stadium: Falmer Stadium; Attendance: 31,487; Referee: David Coote
Note: Fixture was initially scheduled for 5 October, but was moved for live Sky Sports broadcast.

19 October 2024 8	Tottenham Hotspur	4–1	West Ham United	Tottenham
12:30 BST	Kulusevski 36'; Bissouma 52'; Areola 55' (o.g.); Son Heung-min 60'; Van de Ven (yellow card) 84'	Report	Kudus 18', (red card) 86'; Paquetá (yellow card) 43'; Souček (yellow card) 56'; Soler (yellow card) 67'	Stadium: Tottenham Hotspur Stadium; Attendance: 61,381; Referee: Andrew Madley
Note: Fixture was initially scheduled for a 15:00 kick-off, but was moved for live TNT Sports broadcast.

27 October 2024 9	Crystal Palace	1–0	Tottenham Hotspur	Selhurst
14:00 BST	Mateta 31', (yellow card) 32'; Muñoz (yellow card) 41'; Lacroix (yellow card) 61'; Hughes (yellow card) 77'	Report	Kulusevski (yellow card) 37'; Johnson (yellow card) 52'; Van de Ven (yellow card) 65'; Richarlison (yellow card) 85'	Stadium: Selhurst Park; Attendance: 25,108; Referee: Darren Bond
Note: Fixture was initially scheduled for 26 October, but was moved due to participation in the UEFA Europa League on the preceding Thursday.

3 November 2024 10	Tottenham Hotspur	4–1	Aston Villa	Tottenham
14:00 GMT	Johnson 49'; Porro (yellow card) 54'; Romero (yellow card) 58'; Solanke 75', 79'; Maddison 90+6'	Report	Rogers 32'	Stadium: Tottenham Hotspur Stadium; Attendance: 61,253; Referee: Craig Pawson
Note: Fixture was initially scheduled for 2 November, but was moved for live Sky Sports broadcast.

10 November 2024 11	Tottenham Hotspur	1–2	Ipswich Town	Tottenham
14:00 GMT	Bentancur 69', (yellow card) 78'	Report	Tuanzebe (yellow card) 21'; Szmodics 31'; Delap 43', (yellow card) 46'; Johnson (yellow card) 65'; Davis (yellow card) 90+3'; Hutchinson (yellow card) 90+8'	Stadium: Tottenham Hotspur Stadium; Attendance: 61,505; Referee: Darren England
Note: Fixture was initially scheduled for 9 November, but was moved due to UEFA Europa League action on the preceding Thursday.

23 November 2024 12	Manchester City	0–4	Tottenham Hotspur	Manchester
17:30 GMT	Lewis (yellow card) 55'; Silva (yellow card) 78'; De Bruyne (yellow card) 80'; Akanji (yellow card) 90+2'	Report	Bissouma (yellow card) 1'; Maddison 13', 20'; Porro 52'; Sarr (yellow card) 80'; Johnson 90+3'	Stadium: City of Manchester Stadium; Attendance: 52,478; Referee: John Brooks
Note: Fixture was initially scheduled for a 15:00 kick-off, but was moved for live Sky Sports broadcast.

1 December 2024 13	Tottenham Hotspur	1–1	Fulham	Tottenham
13:30 GMT	Johnson 54'	Report	Lukić (yellow card) 57'; Cairney 67', (red card) 83'	Stadium: Tottenham Hotspur Stadium; Attendance: 61,141; Referee: Darren Bond
Note: Fixture was initially scheduled for 30 November, but was moved due to UEFA Europa League action on the preceding Thursday.

5 December 2024 14	Bournemouth	1–0	Tottenham Hotspur	Bournemouth
20:15 GMT	Huijsen 17'; Arrizabalaga (yellow card) 62'; Adams (yellow card) 68'	Report	Davies (yellow card) 4'; Bissouma (yellow card) 21'	Stadium: Dean Court; Attendance: 11,234; Referee: Simon Hooper
Note: Fixture was initially scheduled for 3 December, but was moved for live Amazon Prime Video broadcasting.

8 December 2024 15	Tottenham Hotspur	3–4	Chelsea	Tottenham
16:30 GMT	Solanke 5'; Kulusevski 11'; Sarr (yellow card) 30'; Bissouma (yellow card) 59'; Son Heung-min 90+6'	Report	Sancho 17'; Lavia (yellow card) 21'; Palmer 61' (pen.), 84' (pen.); Fernández 73'; Neto (yellow card) 85'; Sánchez (yellow card) 90+8'	Stadium: Tottenham Hotspur Stadium; Attendance: 61,184; Referee: Anthony Taylor
Note: Fixture was initially scheduled for 7 December, but was moved for live Sky Sports broadcasting.

15 December 2024 16	Southampton	0–5	Tottenham Hotspur	Southampton
19:00 GMT	Fernandes (yellow card) 36'	Report	Maddison 1', 45+4', (yellow card) 50'; Son Heung-min 12'; Kulusevski 14'; Sarr 25'; Bergvall (yellow card) 30'; Johnson (yellow card) 58'	Stadium: St Mary's Stadium; Attendance: 31,090; Referee: Darren England
Note: Fixture was initially scheduled for 14 December, but was moved for live TNT Sport broadcasting.

22 December 2024 17	Tottenham Hotspur	3–6	Liverpool	Tottenham
16:30 GMT	Maddison 41'; Kulusevski 72'; Bergvall (yellow card) 79'; Solanke 83'	Report	Díaz 23', 85'; Gakpo (yellow card) 31'; Mac Allister 36'; Szoboszlai 45+1', (yellow card) 52'; Salah 54', 61'	Stadium: Tottenham Hotspur Stadium; Attendance: 61,439; Referee: Sam Barrott
Note: Fixture was initially scheduled for 21 December, but was moved for live Sky Sports broadcasting.

26 December 2024 18	Nottingham Forest	1–0	Tottenham Hotspur	West Bridgford
15:00 GMT	Yates (yellow card) 10'; Elanga 28'; Anderson (yellow card) 45'; Murillo (yellow card) 65'	Report	Drăgușin (yellow card) 49'; Spence (yellow card) 75' (yellow-red card) 90+4'; Maddison (yellow card) 77'	Stadium: City Ground; Attendance: 30,200; Referee: Craig Pawson
Note: Fixture broadcast live on Amazon Prime Video.

29 December 2024 19	Tottenham Hotspur	2–2	Wolverhampton Wanderers	Tottenham
15:00 GMT	Bentancur 12', (yellow card) 90+7'; Son Heung-min (penalty missed) 43'; Johnson 45+3'	Report	Hwang Hee-chan 7'; Bellegarde (yellow card) 27'; Semedo (yellow card) 45+2'; Larsen 87'	Stadium: Tottenham Hotspur Stadium; Attendance: 61,284; Referee: Chris Kavanagh

4 January 2025 20	Tottenham Hotspur	1–2	Newcastle United	Tottenham
12:30 GMT	Solanke 4'; Reguilón (yellow card) 90+9'	Report	Gordon 6'; Burn (yellow card) 17'; Isak 38', (yellow card) 86'; Joelinton (yellow card) 73'; Botman (yellow card) 80'	Stadium: Tottenham Hotspur Stadium; Attendance: 61,293; Referee: Andrew Madley
Note: Fixture was initially scheduled for a 15:00 kick-off, but was moved for live TNT Sports broadcasting.

15 January 2025 21	Arsenal	2–1	Tottenham Hotspur	Holloway
20:00 GMT	Solanke 40' (o.g.); Havertz (yellow card) 43'; Trossard 44'; Lewis-Skelly (yellow card) 87'; Gabriel (yellow card) 90+2'	Report	Son Heung-min 25'; Sarr (yellow card) 27'	Stadium: Emirates Stadium; Attendance: 60,287; Referee: Simon Hooper
Note: Fixture was initially scheduled for 14 January, but was moved for live TNT Sports broadcasting.

19 January 2025 22	Everton	3–2	Tottenham Hotspur	Liverpool
14:00 GMT	Calvert-Lewin 13', (yellow card) 42'; Ndiaye 30'; Gray 45+7' (o.g.); Doucouré (yellow card) 67'	Report	Bergvall (yellow card) 40'; Kulusevski 77'; Richarlison 90+2'	Stadium: Goodison Park; Attendance: 39,326; Referee: Darren England
Note: Fixture was initially scheduled for 18 January, but was moved for live Sky Sports broadcasting.

26 January 2025 23	Tottenham Hotspur	1–2	Leicester City	Tottenham
14:00 GMT	Richarlison 33'; Reguilón (yellow card) 69'	Report	Vardy 46'; El Khannouss 50'; De Cordova-Reid (yellow card) 61'; Justin (yellow card) 71'; Winks (yellow card) 75'; Buonanotte (yellow card) 78'; Stolarczyk (yellow card) 82'	Stadium: Tottenham Hotspur Stadium; Attendance: 61,295; Referee: Robert Jones
Note: Fixture was initially scheduled for 25 January, but was moved for live Sky Sports broadcasting.

2 February 2025 24	Brentford	0–2	Tottenham Hotspur	Brentford
14:00 GMT		Report	Janelt 29' (o.g.); Son Heung-min (yellow card) 41'; Sarr 87'	Stadium: Brentford Community Stadium; Attendance: 17,154; Referee: Jarred Gillett
Note: Fixture was initially scheduled for 1 February, but was moved for live Sky Sports broadcasting.

16 February 2025 25	Tottenham Hotspur	1–0	Manchester United	Tottenham
16:30 GMT	Maddison 13'; Davies (yellow card) 79'	Report	Casemiro (yellow card) 41'; Dorgu (yellow card) 90'	Stadium: Tottenham Hotspur Stadium; Attendance: 61,383; Referee: Peter Bankes
Note: Fixture was initially scheduled for 15 February, but was moved for live Sky Sports broadcasting.

22 February 2025 26	Ipswich Town	1–4	Tottenham Hotspur	Ipswich
15:00 GMT	Clarke (yellow card) 32'; Hutchinson 36'; Godfrey (yellow card) 40'	Report	Johnson (yellow card) 15', (goal) 18', 26'; Spence 77'; Kulusevski 84'	Stadium: Portman Road; Attendance: 30,003; Referee: Tim Robinson

26 February 2025 27	Tottenham Hotspur	0–1	Manchester City	Tottenham
19:30 GMT	Bentancur (yellow card) 31'; Maddison (yellow card) 57'; Sarr (yellow card) 87'	Report	Haaland 12'	Stadium: Tottenham Hotspur Stadium; Attendance: 60,820; Referee: Jarred Gillett
Note: Fixture was initially scheduled for 25 February, but was moved for live TNT Sports broadcasting.

9 March 2025 28	Tottenham Hotspur	2–2	Bournemouth	Tottenham
14:00 GMT	Bentancur (yellow card) 30'; Bissouma (yellow card) 45'; Sarr 67'; Son Heung-min 84' (pen.); Maddison (yellow card) 86'	Report	Tavernier (yellow card) 4', (goal) 42'; Evanilson 65'; Semenyo (yellow card) 69'; Huijsen (yellow card) 87'	Stadium: Tottenham Hotspur Stadium; Attendance: 61,178; Referee: John Brooks
Note: Fixture was initially scheduled for 8 March, but was moved for live Sky Sports broadcasting.

16 March 2025 29	Fulham	2–0	Tottenham Hotspur	Fulham
13:30 GMT	Muniz 78'; Sessegnon 88'	Report		Stadium: Craven Cottage; Attendance: 27,182; Referee: Andrew Madley
Note: Fixture was initially scheduled for 15 March, but was moved due to UEFA Europa League involvements on the preceding Thursday.

3 April 2025 30	Chelsea	1–0	Tottenham Hotspur	Fulham
20:00 BST	Chalobah (yellow card) 45+1'; Fernández 50'; Jackson (yellow card) 67'; Cucurella (yellow card) 73'; Neto (yellow card) 80'; Palmer (yellow card) 86'	Report	Romero (yellow card) 45+1'; Sarr (yellow card) 72'; Porro (yellow card) 90+8'; Johnson (yellow card) 90+8'; Spence (yellow card) 90+13'	Stadium: Stamford Bridge; Attendance: 39,852; Referee: Craig Pawson
Note: Fixture was initially scheduled for 2 April, but was moved for live Sky Sports broadcasting.

6 April 2025 31	Tottenham Hotspur	3–1	Southampton	Tottenham
14:00 BST	Johnson 13', 42'; Porro (yellow card) 60'; Tel 90+6' (pen.)	Report	Ugochukwu (yellow card) 26'; Fernandes 90'	Stadium: Tottenham Hotspur Stadium; Attendance: 60,984; Referee: Michael Salisbury
Note: Fixture was initially scheduled for 5 April, but was moved due to having a fixture on the preceding Thursday.

13 April 2025 32	Wolverhampton Wanderers	4–2	Tottenham Hotspur	Wolverhampton
14:00 BST	Aït-Nouri 2'; Spence 38' (o.g.); Larsen 64'; Toti (yellow card) 86'; Cunha 86'	Report	Bissouma (yellow card) 8'; Tel 59'; Davies (yellow card) 70'; Richarlison 85'	Stadium: Molineux Stadium; Attendance: 31,463; Referee: Anthony Taylor
Note: Fixture was initially scheduled for 12 April, but was moved due to UEFA Europa League involvements on the preceding Thursday.

21 April 2025 33	Tottenham Hotspur	1–2	Nottingham Forest	Tottenham
20:00 BST	Romero (yellow card) 42'; Richarlison 87'	Report	Anderson 5'; Wood 16'; Gibbs-White (yellow card) 65'; Yates (yellow card) 89'; Sels (yellow card) 90+2'; Toffolo (yellow card) 90+4'	Stadium: Tottenham Hotspur Stadium; Attendance: 59,314; Referee: Peter Bankes
Note: Fixture was initially scheduled for 19 April, but was moved for live Sky Sports broadcasting.

27 April 2025 34	Liverpool	5–1	Tottenham Hotspur	Liverpool
16:30 BST	Díaz 16'; Mac Allister 24'; Gakpo 34', (yellow card) 34'; Salah 63'; Udogie 69' (o.g.); Elliott (yellow card) 90+4'	Report	Solanke 12'; Richarlison (yellow card) 90+4'	Stadium: Anfield; Attendance: 60,415; Referee: Thomas Bramall
Note: Fixture was initially scheduled for 19 April, but was moved for live Sky Sports broadcasting.

4 May 2025 35	West Ham United	1–1	Tottenham Hotspur	Stratford
14:00 BST	Kudus (yellow card) 19'; Bowen 28'; Paquetá (yellow card) 73'	Report	Davies (yellow card) 13'; Odobert 15'; Tel (yellow card) 88'	Stadium: London Stadium; Attendance: 62,468; Referee: Michael Oliver
Note: Fixture was initially scheduled for 3 May, but was moved due to UEFA Europa League involvements on the preceding Thursday.

11 May 2025 36	Tottenham Hotspur	0–2	Crystal Palace	Tottenham
14:15 BST	Bentancur (yellow card) 37'	Report	Eze 45', 48'; Lerma (yellow card) 47'	Stadium: Tottenham Hotspur Stadium; Attendance: 60,254; Referee: Chris Kavanagh
Note: Fixture was initially scheduled for 10 May, but was moved due to UEFA Europa League involvements on the preceding Thursday.

16 May 2025 37	Aston Villa	2–0	Tottenham Hotspur	Birmingham
19:30 BST	Cash (yellow card) 23'; Konsa 59'; Kamara 73'	Report	Gray (yellow card) 33'; Tel (yellow card) 62'	Stadium: Villa Park; Attendance: 42,239; Referee: Peter Bankes
Note: Fixture was initially scheduled for 18 May, but was moved due to anticipated involvement in the UEFA Europa League final on the following Wednesday.

25 May 2025 38	Tottenham Hotspur	1–4	Brighton & Hove Albion	Tottenham
16:00 BST	Solanke 17' (pen.); Bentancur (yellow card) 38'; Porro (yellow card) 58'; Davies (yellow card) 80'	Report	Hinshelwood 51', 64'; Veltman (yellow card) 79'; O'Riley 88' (pen.); Gómez 90+3'	Stadium: Tottenham Hotspur Stadium; Attendance: 61,449; Referee: Robert Jones

=== FA Cup ===
Tottenham Hotspur joined the FA Cup in the third round, and were drawn away to Tamworth, the lowest ranked team left in the competition. In the fourth round, they were drawn away again, against Aston Villa.

Win Draw Loss Fixtures

12 January 2025 Third round	Tamworth	0–3 (a.e.t.)	Tottenham Hotspur	Tamworth
12:30 GMT	Creaney (yellow card) 60'; Tonks (yellow card) 83'; McGlinchey (yellow card) 90+5'; Williams (yellow card) 92'	Report	Drăgușin (yellow card) 60'; Porro (yellow card) 76'; Tshikuna 101' (o.g.); Kulusevski 107'; Johnson 118'	Stadium: The Lamb Ground; Attendance: 3,720; Referee: Peter Bankes

9 February 2025 Fourth round	Aston Villa	2–1	Tottenham Hotspur	Birmingham
17:35 GMT	Ramsey 1'; Rogers 64'	Report	Bentancur (yellow card) 60'; Bergvall (yellow card) 62'; Porro (yellow card) 80'; Tel 90+1'	Stadium: Villa Park; Attendance: 40,773; Referee: Anthony Taylor

=== EFL Cup ===
Tottenham entered the EFL Cup in the third round as one of the Premier League teams participating in European competitions, and were drawn away to EFL Championship side Coventry City. In the fourth and fifth round, they were drawn at home to Manchester City and Manchester United respectively. In the semi-finals, a two-legged tie against Liverpool was confirmed, with the first leg at home and second leg away.

18 September 2024 Third round	Coventry City	1–2	Tottenham Hotspur	Coventry
20:00 BST	Binks (yellow card) 25'; Allen (yellow card) 57'; Thomas-Asante 63', (yellow card) 90+4'; Kitching (yellow card) 86'	Report	Spence 88'; Maddison (yellow card) 90'; Johnson 90+2'	Stadium: Coventry Building Society Arena; Attendance: 24,616; Referee: Darren England

30 October 2024 Fourth round	Tottenham Hotspur	2–1	Manchester City	Tottenham
20:15 GMT	Werner 5'; Sarr (yellow card) 23', (goal) 25'; Bissouma (yellow card) 53'; Gray (yellow card) 90'	Report	Nunes 45+4'	Stadium: Tottenham Hotspur Stadium; Attendance: 60,797; Referee: Robert Jones

19 December 2024 Quarter-finals	Tottenham Hotspur	4–3	Manchester United	Tottenham
20:00 GMT	Solanke 15', 54'; Sarr (yellow card) 23'; Kulusevski 46'; Maddison (yellow card) 78'; Son Heung-min 88'; Bergvall (yellow card) 90+8'	Report	Mazraoui (yellow card) 25'; Zirkzee 63'; Amad 70'; Bayındır (yellow card) 88'; Fernandes (yellow card) 90+1'; Evans 90+4'	Stadium: Tottenham Hotspur Stadium; Attendance: 57,409; Referee: John Brooks

8 January 2025 Semi-finals First leg	Tottenham Hotspur	1–0	Liverpool	Tottenham
20:00 GMT	Bissouma (yellow card) 32'; Bergvall (yellow card) 68', (goal) 86'	Report		Stadium: Tottenham Hotspur Stadium; Attendance: 59,037; Referee: Stuart Attwell

6 February 2025 Semi-finals Second leg	Liverpool	4–0 (4–1 agg.)	Tottenham Hotspur	Liverpool
20:00 GMT	Gakpo 34'; Salah 51' (pen.); Szoboszlai 75'; Van Dijk 80'	Report		Stadium: Anfield; Attendance: 60,395; Referee: Craig Pawson

=== UEFA Europa League ===
Win Draw Loss Fixtures

==== League phase ====
The draw for the league phase was held on 30 August 2024.

Pos	Team	Pld	W	D	L	GF	GA	GD	Pts	Qualification
2	(Royal Spanish Football Federation) Athletic Bilbao	8	6	1	1	15	7	+8	19	Advance to round of 16 (seeded)
3	(The Football Association) Manchester United	8	5	3	0	16	9	+7	18	Advance to round of 16 (seeded)
4	(The Football Association) Tottenham Hotspur	8	5	2	1	17	9	+8	17	Advance to round of 16 (seeded)
5	(German Football Association) Eintracht Frankfurt	8	5	1	2	14	10	+4	16	Advance to round of 16 (seeded)
6	(French Football Federation) Lyon	8	4	3	1	16	8	+8	15	Advance to round of 16 (seeded)

Source: UEFA
Rules for classification: League phase tiebreakers

Round	1	2	3	4	5	6	7	8
Ground	H	A	H	A	H	A	A	H
Result	W	W	W	L	D	D	W	W
Position	4	3	2	7	9	9	6	4
Points	3	6	9	9	10	11	14	17

Source: UEFA
A = Away; H = Home; W = Win; D = Draw; L = Loss

26 September 2024 1	Tottenham Hotspur (England)	3–0	(Azerbaijan) Qarabağ	London, England
20:35 BST	Drăgușin (red card) 7'; Johnson 12'; Sarr 52'; Bissouma (yellow card) 56'; Solanke 68'	Report	Cafarguliyev (yellow card) 23'; Bayramov (penalty missed) 58'	Stadium: Tottenham Hotspur Stadium; Attendance: 51,757; Referee: Willy Delajod (France)
Note: Kick-off was originally scheduled for 20:00, but was delayed to 20:35 due to the Qarabağ team getting stuck in traffic and arriving late to the stadium.

3 October 2024 2	Ferencváros (Hungary)	1–2	(England) Tottenham Hotspur	Budapest, Hungary
18:45 CEST	Ćivić (yellow card) 22'; B. Varga 90'	Report	Sarr 23'; Johnson 86'	Stadium: Ferencváros Stadion; Attendance: 20,795; Referee: Igor Pajač (Croatia)

24 October 2024 3	Tottenham Hotspur (England)	1–0	(Netherlands) AZ	London, England
20:00 BST	Richarlison 53' (pen.)	Report	Wolfe (yellow card) 56' (yellow-red card) 85'; Dekker (yellow card) 80'; Kwakman (yellow card) 90'; Clasie (yellow card) 90'	Stadium: Tottenham Hotspur Stadium; Attendance: 53,438; Referee: Manfredas Lukjančukas (Lithuania)

7 November 2024 4	Galatasaray (Turkey)	3–2	(England) Tottenham Hotspur	Istanbul, Turkey
20:45 TRT	Akgün 6'; Mertens (yellow card) 16'; Osimhen 31', 39'; Sara (yellow card) 54'; Torreira (yellow card) 90+6'	Report	Lankshear 18', (yellow card) 53' (yellow-red card) 60'; Drăgușin (yellow card) 32'; Kulusevski (yellow card) 48'; Bissouma (yellow card) 60'; Solanke 69'; Bentancur (yellow card) 90+3'	Stadium: Rams Park; Attendance: 51,739; Referee: Lawrence Visser (Belgium)

28 November 2024 5	Tottenham Hotspur (England)	2–2	(Italy) Roma	London, England
20:00 GMT	Son Heung-min 5' (pen.); Kulusevski (yellow card) 28'; Johnson 33'; Bentancur (yellow card) 72'	Report	Ndicka 20'; Paredes (yellow card) 28'; Hummels 90+1'	Stadium: Tottenham Hotspur Stadium; Attendance: 53,378; Referee: Glenn Nyberg (Sweden)

12 December 2024 6	Rangers (Scotland)	1–1	(England) Tottenham Hotspur	Glasgow, Scotland
20:00 GMT	Diomande (yellow card) 20'; Igamane 47'	Report	Drăgușin (yellow card) 68'; Bergvall (yellow card) 73'; Kulusevski 75'	Stadium: Ibrox Stadium; Attendance: 48,064; Referee: Sandro Schärer (Switzerland)

23 January 2025 7	TSG Hoffenheim (Germany)	2–3	(England) Tottenham Hotspur	Sinsheim, Germany
18:45 CET	Akpoguma (yellow card) 10'; Stach 68'; Mowka 88'	Report	Maddison 3'; Son Heung-min 22', 77'	Stadium: Rhein-Neckar-Arena; Attendance: 30,150; Referee: Morten Krogh (Denmark)

30 January 2025 8	Tottenham Hotspur (England)	3–0	(Sweden) IF Elfsborg	London, England
20:00 GMT	Scarlett 70'; Ajayi 84'; Bergvall (yellow card) 88'; Moore 90+4'	Report		Stadium: Tottenham Hotspur Stadium; Attendance: 57,337; Referee: Sebastian Gishamer (Austria)

==== Knockout phase ====
===== Round of 16 =====
The draw for the round of 16 was held on 21 February 2025, with Tottenham being drawn against Eredivisie side AZ.

6 March 2025 First leg	AZ (Netherlands)	1–0	(England) Tottenham Hotspur	Alkmaar, Netherlands
18:45 CET	Bergvall 18' (o.g.); Koopmeiners (yellow card) 66'; Poku (yellow card) 68'; Van Duijn (yellow card) 90+4'	Report	Bentancur (yellow card) 62'	Stadium: AFAS Stadion; Attendance: 18,281; Referee: Rade Obrenovič (Slovenia)

13 March 2025 Second leg	Tottenham Hotspur (England)	3–1 (3–2 agg.)	(Netherlands) AZ	London, England
20:00 GMT	Odobert 26', 74'; Maddison 48'	Report	Koopmeiners 63'; Clasie (yellow card) 90+5'	Stadium: Tottenham Hotspur Stadium; Attendance: 58,302; Referee: João Pinheiro (Portugal)

===== Quarter-finals =====
The draw for the order of the quarter-final legs was held on 21 February 2025, after the draw for the round of 16.

10 April 2025 First leg	Tottenham Hotspur (England)	1–1	(Germany) Eintracht Frankfurt	London, England
20:00 BST	Porro 26'; Tel (yellow card) 86'	Report	Ekitike 6'; Bahoya (yellow card) 62'; Kristensen (yellow card) 71'	Stadium: Tottenham Hotspur Stadium; Attendance: 57,849; Referee: Szymon Marciniak (Poland)

17 April 2025 Second leg	Eintracht Frankfurt (Germany)	0–1 (1–2 agg.)	(England) Tottenham Hotspur	Frankfurt, Germany
21:00 CEST	Santos (yellow card) 42'; Kristensen (yellow card) 57'; Theate (yellow card) 90+6'	Report	Solanke 43' (pen.); Johnson (yellow card) 45+6'; Bentancur (yellow card) 79'; Romero (yellow card) 90+7'	Stadium: Waldstadion; Attendance: 57,500; Referee: Davide Massa (Italy)

===== Semi-finals =====
The draw for the order of the semi-final legs was held on 21 February 2025, after the draw for the round of 16 and quarter-finals.

1 May 2025 First leg	Tottenham Hotspur (England)	3–1	(Norway) Bodø/Glimt	London, England
20:00 BST	Johnson 1'; Maddison 34'; Solanke 61' (pen.); Romero (yellow card) 73'	Report	Bjørkan (yellow card) 57'; Hauge (yellow card) 76'; Saltnes 83'	Stadium: Tottenham Hotspur Stadium; Attendance: 61,327; Referee: José María Sánchez Martínez (Spain)

8 May 2025 Second leg	Bodø/Glimt (Norway)	0–2 (1–5 agg.)	(England) Tottenham Hotspur	Bodø, Norway
20:00 BST	Høgh (yellow card) 26'	Report	Johnson (yellow card) 33'; Solanke 63'; Vicario (yellow card) 66'; Porro 69'	Stadium: Aspmyra Stadion; Attendance: 8,030; Referee: Maurizio Mariani (Italy)

===== Final =====
21 May 2025 Final	Tottenham Hotspur (England)	1–0	(England) Manchester United	Bilbao, Spain
20:00 BST	Johnson 42'; Van de Ven (yellow card) 49'; Richarlison (yellow card) 58'; Bissouma (yellow card) 68'	Report	Amad (yellow card) 35'; Zirkzee (yellow card) 84'; Maguire (yellow card) 88'; Evans (yellow card) 90+1'	Stadium: San Mamés; Attendance: 49,924; Referee: Felix Zwayer (Germany)

== Statistics ==
=== Appearances ===
No.	Pos.	Player	Premier League		FA Cup		EFL Cup		Europa League		Total	
No.	Pos.	Player	Apps	Goals	Apps	Goals	Apps	Goals	Apps	Goals	Apps	Goals
1	GK	(Italy) Guglielmo Vicario	24	0	0	0	1	0	9	0	34	0
3	DF	(Spain) Sergio Reguilón	1+3	0	1	0	0+1	0	0	0	2+4	0
4	DF	(Austria) Kevin Danso	10+1	0	1	0	1	0	1+2	0	13+3	0
6	DF	(Romania) Radu Drăgușin	13+2	0	1	0	4	0	6+1	0	25+3	0
7	FW	(South Korea) Son Heung-min	24+6	7	1+1	0	3+1	1	9+1	3	37+9	11
8	MF	(Mali) Yves Bissouma	16+12	2	1+1	0	3+1	0	7+3	0	27+17	2
9	FW	(Brazil) Richarlison	4+11	4	0	0	1+1	0	6+1	1	11+13	5
10	MF	(England) James Maddison	22+10	9	1	0	1+1	0	9+2	3	33+13	12
11	FW	(France) Mathys Tel	11+2	2	1	1	0+1	0	2+3	0	14+6	3
13	DF	(Italy) Destiny Udogie	24+1	0	0	0	1+1	0	8+1	0	33+3	0
14	MF	(England) Archie Gray	19+9	0	2	0	5	0	9+2	0	35+11	0
15	MF	(Sweden) Lucas Bergvall	11+16	0	1+1	0	2+2	1	10+2	0	24+21	1
16	FW	(Germany) Timo Werner	4+14	0	1	0	2+1	1	3+2	0	10+17	1
17	DF	(Argentina) Cristian Romero	18	1	0	0	1	0	7	0	26	1
19	FW	(England) Dominic Solanke	25+2	9	0+1	0	4	2	8+5	5	37+8	16
20	GK	(England) Fraser Forster	7	0	0	0	2	0	4	0	13	0
21	FW	(Sweden) Dejan Kulusevski	27+5	7	1+1	1	4+1	1	3+8	1	35+15	10
22	FW	(Wales) Brennan Johnson	24+9	11	1	1	1+3	1	10+3	5	36+15	18
23	DF	(Spain) Pedro Porro	28+5	2	2	0	2+1	0	12+1	2	44+7	4
24	DF	(England) Djed Spence	19+6	1	1+1	0	3+1	1	2+2	0	25+10	2
28	FW	(France) Wilson Odobert	9+7	1	0	0	1	0	1+3	2	11+10	3
29	MF	(Senegal) Pape Matar Sarr	22+14	3	1+1	0	4	1	6+7	2	32+22	6
30	MF	(Uruguay) Rodrigo Bentancur	21+5	2	1	0	4	0	11+2	0	37+7	2
31	GK	(Czech Republic) Antonín Kinský	6	0	2	0	2	0	0	0	10	0
33	DF	(Wales) Ben Davies	14+3	0	0	0	2+1	0	7+1	0	23+5	0
37	DF	(Netherlands) Micky van de Ven	12+1	0	0	0	1	0	8	0	21+1	0
40	GK	(United States) Brandon Austin	1	0	0	0	0	0	2	0	3	0
42	FW	(England) Will Lankshear	0+3	0	0	0	0	0	2+1	1	2+4	1
44	FW	(England) Dane Scarlett	0+3	0	0	0	0	0	0+2	1	0+5	1
47	MF	(England) Mikey Moore	3+7	0	2	0	0+2	0	3+2	1	8+11	1
48	DF	(England) Alfie Dorrington	0+1	0	0	0	0	0	0	0	0+1	0
63	FW	(England) Damola Ajayi	0	0	0	0	0	0	0+1	1	0+1	1
64	MF	(England) Callum Olusesi	0	0	0	0	0	0	0+1	0	0+1	0

Source: Premier League

=== Goalscorers ===
The list is sorted by squad number when total goals are equal.

Rank	Pos.	No.	Player	Premier League	FA Cup	EFL Cup	UEFA Europa League	Total
1	FW	22	(Wales) Brennan Johnson	11	1	1	5	18
2	FW	19	(England) Dominic Solanke	9	0	2	5	16
3	MF	10	(England) James Maddison	9	0	0	3	12
4	FW	7	(South Korea) Son Heung-min	7	0	1	3	11
5	MF	21	(Sweden) Dejan Kulusevski	7	1	1	1	10
6	MF	29	(Senegal) Pape Matar Sarr	3	0	1	2	6
7	FW	9	(Brazil) Richarlison	4	0	0	1	5
8	DF	23	(Spain) Pedro Porro	2	0	0	2	4
9	FW	11	(France) Mathys Tel	2	1	0	0	3
9	FW	28	(France) Wilson Odobert	1	0	0	2	3
11	MF	8	(Mali) Yves Bissouma	2	0	0	0	2
11	DF	24	(England) Djed Spence	1	0	1	0	2
11	MF	30	(Uruguay) Rodrigo Bentancur	2	0	0	0	2
14	MF	15	(Sweden) Lucas Bergvall	0	0	1	0	1
14	FW	16	(Germany) Timo Werner	0	0	1	0	1
14	DF	17	(Argentina) Cristian Romero	1	0	0	0	1
14	FW	42	(England) Will Lankshear	0	0	0	1	1
14	FW	44	(England) Dane Scarlett	0	0	0	1	1
14	FW	47	(England) Mikey Moore	0	0	0	1	1
14	FW	63	(England) Damola Ajayi	0	0	0	1	1
Totals				61	3	9	28	101

Source: Premier League

==== Own goals ====
Player	Against	Competition	Minute	Score after own goal	Result	Date
(England) Dominic Solanke	(England) Arsenal	Premier League	40'	1–1	2–1 (A)	15 January 2025
(England) Archie Gray	(England) Everton	Premier League	45+7'	3–0	3–2 (A)	19 January 2025
(Sweden) Lucas Bergvall	(Netherlands) AZ Alkmaar	Europa League	18'	1–0	1–0 (A)	6 March 2025
(England) Djed Spence	(England) Wolverhampton Wanderers	Premier League	38'	2–0	4–2 (A)	13 April 2025
(Italy) Destiny Udogie	(England) Liverpool	Premier League	69'	5–1	5–1 (A)	27 April 2025

=== Disciplinary ===
The list is sorted by squad number when total cards are equal.

Rank	Pos.	No.	Player	Premier League			FA Cup			EFL Cup			UEFA Europa League			Total		
Rank	Pos.	No.	Player	Yellow card	(yellow card) (yellow-red card)	Red card	Yellow card	(yellow card) (yellow-red card)	Red card	Yellow card	(yellow card) (yellow-red card)	Red card	Yellow card	(yellow card) (yellow-red card)	Red card	Yellow card	(yellow card) (yellow-red card)	Red card
1	MF	30	(Uruguay) Rodrigo Bentancur	9	0	0	1	0	0	0	0	0	3	0	0	13	0	0
2	MF	8	(Mali) Yves Bissouma	7	0	0	0	0	0	2	0	0	3	0	0	12	0	0
3	MF	29	(Senegal) Pape Matar Sarr	6	0	0	0	0	0	2	0	0	1	0	0	9	0	0
4	MF	10	(England) James Maddison	6	0	0	0	0	0	2	0	0	0	0	0	8	0	0
4	MF	15	(Sweden) Lucas Bergvall	3	0	0	1	0	0	2	0	0	2	0	0	8	0	0
6	FW	22	(Wales) Brennan Johnson	5	0	0	0	0	0	0	0	0	2	0	0	7	0	0
6	DF	23	(Spain) Pedro Porro	5	0	0	2	0	0	0	0	0	0	0	0	7	0	0
8	DF	17	(Argentina) Cristian Romero	3	0	0	0	0	0	0	0	0	2	0	0	5	0	0
8	FW	21	(Sweden) Dejan Kulusevski	3	0	0	0	0	0	0	0	0	2	0	0	5	0	0
8	DF	37	(Netherlands) Micky van de Ven	4	0	0	0	0	0	0	0	0	1	0	0	5	0	0
11	DF	6	(Romania) Radu Drăgușin	1	0	0	1	0	0	0	0	0	2	0	1	4	0	1
11	DF	33	(Wales) Ben Davies	5	0	0	0	0	0	0	0	0	0	0	0	5	0	0
13	FW	9	(Brazil) Richarlison	2	0	0	0	0	0	0	0	0	1	0	0	3	0	0
13	FW	11	(France) Mathys Tel	2	0	0	0	0	0	0	0	0	1	0	0	3	0	0
13	DF	24	(England) Djed Spence	2	1	0	0	0	0	0	0	0	0	0	0	2	1	0
16	GK	1	(Italy) Guglielmo Vicario	1	0	0	0	0	0	0	0	0	1	0	0	2	0	0
16	DF	3	(Spain) Sergio Reguilón	2	0	0	0	0	0	0	0	0	0	0	0	2	0	0
16	DF	13	(Italy) Destiny Udogie	2	0	0	0	0	0	0	0	0	0	0	0	2	0	0
16	MF	14	(England) Archie Gray	1	0	0	0	0	0	1	0	0	0	0	0	2	0	0
20	FW	7	(South Korea) Son Heung-min	1	0	0	0	0	0	0	0	0	0	0	0	1	0	0
20	FW	42	(England) Will Lankshear	0	0	0	0	0	0	0	0	0	0	1	0	0	1	0
Totals				70	1	0	5	0	0	9	0	0	21	1	1	105	2	1

Source: Premier League

=== Clean sheets ===
The list is sorted by squad number when total clean sheets are equal.

Rank	No.	Player	Premier League	FA Cup	EFL Cup	UEFA Europa League	Total
1	1	(Italy) Guglielmo Vicario	4	0	0	4	8
2	31	(Czech Republic) Antonín Kinský	1	1	1	0	3
3	20	(England) Fraser Forster	1	0	0	1	2
4	40	(United States) Brandon Austin	0	0	0	1	1
Totals			6	1	1	6	14

Source: Premier League
