= Indonesians in the United Kingdom =

Total population
- Ethnic Indonesian: 7,344 (England and Wales only, 2021)

Regions with significant populations
- London, South-East England

Languages
- Indonesian, English and various other languages of Indonesia

Religion
- Mahayana Buddhism, Christianity, Islam, Hinduism

Indonesian people in the United Kingdom include British citizens and non-citizen immigrants and expatriates of Indonesian descent in the United Kingdom.

== Demographics ==
=== Population ===
The 2001 Census recorded 6,711 Indonesian-born people residing in the UK. According to the 2011 UK Census, there were 8,659 Indonesian-born residents in England, 212 in Wales, 679 in Scotland, and 74 in Northern Ireland.

== Notable people ==
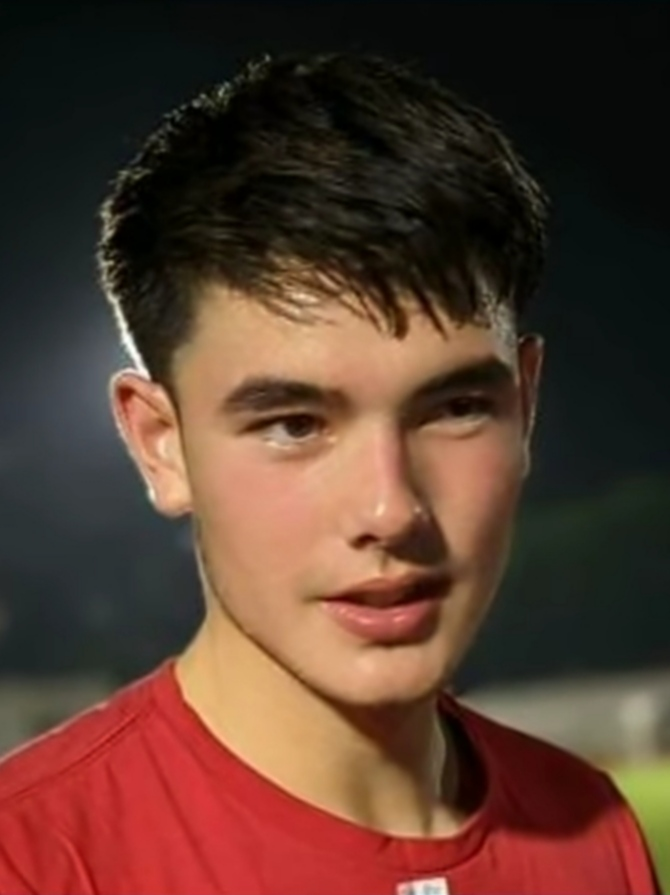
Elkan Baggott

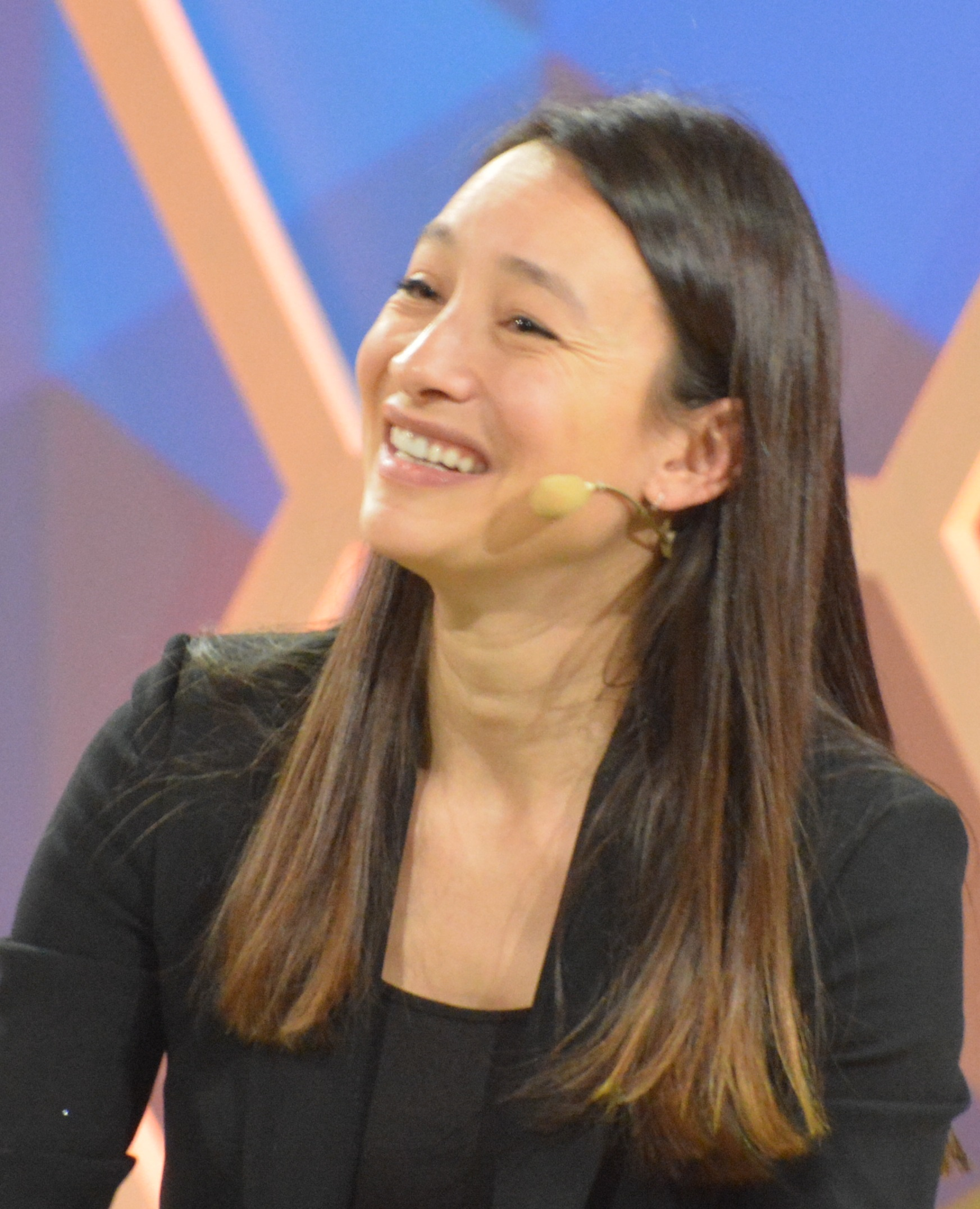
Joanna Natasegara

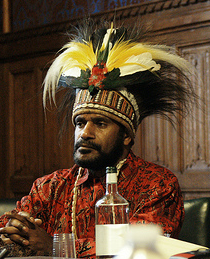
Benny Wenda

Notable Indonesians in the United Kingdom include:

- Elkan Baggott, footballer
- George Brown, footballer
- James Chau, journalist
- Theresa Cheung, spirituality writer
- Huge Davies, comedian
- Rosalie Deighton, musician
- Joe Ferguson, footballer
- Violet Gordon-Woodhouse, keyboard player
- Justin Hubner, footballer
- Joanna Natasegara, filmmaker
- Devon van Oostrum, basketball player
- Sri Owen, food writer
- Hannah Al Rashid, actress and model
- Sinta Tantra, artist
- Benny Wenda, political activist
- Han Willhoft-King, footballer

== See also ==
- Indonesian diaspora
- Indonesia–United Kingdom relations
