= David Pickering =

David Pickering may refer to:

- David Pickering (writer) (born 1958), reference books compiler
- David Pickering (rugby union) (born 1960), former Wales international rugby union player
