= Fern (TV series) =

- Genre: Talk show
- Presented by: Fern Britton
- Country of origin: United Kingdom
- Original language: English
- No. of series: 1
- No. of episodes: 20

Production
- Running time: 60 minutes (inc. adverts)
- Production company: Cactus TV

Original release
- Network: Channel 4
- Release: 28 March – 22 April 2011

Fern is a British talk show hosted by Fern Britton which aired on Channel 4 on weekdays at 5:00 p.m. in March and April 2011. The format is a teatime chat show featuring real-life stories, a mix of gossip and entertainment. The studio had a sofa area for interviewing celebrity guests, a kitchen area, two smaller areas for interviewing other guests and an audience. Britton interviewed a range of guests on the show including actors Alan Cumming, Richard Wilson and Richard E. Grant, singer Coleen Nolan, disc-jockeys Chris Evans and Chris Moyles, musician Brian May, comedians Alan Carr and Miranda Hart and charity fundraiser Jack Henderson.

Fern received lower ratings than expected, and was axed after its four-week trial run. As of May 2011, Britton was said to be discussing alternative formats with Channel 4 and her chat show may be revived at a later date in a different format.
