= Jim Buttress =

British gardener

Jim Cuthbert
- Born: 28 January 1945 (age 80); Dennistoun, Glasgow
- Occupation: gardener

Jim Cuthbert Buttress (born 28 January 1945) is a British horticulturalist. He managed gardens for Queen Elizabeth II and the Queen Elizabeth The Queen Mother and went on to become a judge for the RHS, creating eight gold winning gardens at the Chelsea Flower Show. He was awarded the RHS Victoria Medal of Honour in 2006. He was known as 'The Queen's gardener".

== Life ==
Buttress was born on 28 January 1945 on the 10th floor of a tenement in Dennistoun, Glasgow. He described the area as one of "poverty deprivation and violence". He is the eldest of three children, the son of Owen (b. 1914), a devout Catholic, and Barbara, a Protestant (b. 1911). After Jim's father left the army, the family moved to Sussex where they had a large garden. Owen had dreamed of training at RHS Wisley, but spent his life working in the insurance industry, always maintaining an allotment, where Jim helped. Jim's grandparents had a smallholding in Wickford, Essex, where they grew fruit and vegetables. Jim records being mad for gardening from the age of four and his father encouraged his son to follow his dreams into horticulture. Jim was inspired by TV gardener Percy Thrower and horticulturalist Fred Nutbeam, training at RHS Wisley. He first worked at the W Fuller nursery (1962–64) and then in Croydon parks department, later employed by the GLC for nine years (1967–77).

Jim Buttress, the 66-year old "Judge Dread"
of the annual Britain in Bloom competition,
needs no reminding that his verdict can make
or break the place where you live.
A nod from Jim can raise house prices,
attract businesses, bring in tourists
and secure council grants.

From 1977 Buttress was Superintendent of the central Royal Parks for ten years, stewarding spaces including Green Park, Hyde Park, St James's Park, Buckingham Palace, Clarence House and the nursery at Richmond Park. He liaised with Queen Elizabeth and the Queen Mother in garden planning. In 1982 he became the Superintendent of Greenwich Park and retired in 1996. He created many show gardens at the RHS Chelsea Flower Show, winning eight gold medals. He is a head judge for the RHS and was a Britain in Bloom judge for 25 years. He was a judge in the BBC's Big Allotment Challenge.

Buttress is a big football fan, supporting Crystal Palace. He wrote his autobiography The People's Gardener in 2016. Buttress was awarded the Associate Medal of Honour (1999) and the Victoria Medal of Honour (2006) from the RHS. In 1999 he gained a Fellowship from the Institute of Horticulture.
