= Watercolour Challenge =

- Genre: Lifestyle game show
- Presented by: Hannah Gordon (1998–2001); Fern Britton (2022)
- Country of origin: United Kingdom
- Original language: English
- No. of series: 4 (original); 1 (revival)
- No. of episodes: 210 (original); 20 (revival)

Production
- Running time: 30 minutes (original); 60 minutes (revival)
- Production companies: Planet 24 (1998–2001); Twofour (2022)

Original release
- Network: Channel 4
- Release: 15 June 1998 – 23 November 2001
- Network: Channel 5
- Release: 17 January – 11 February 2022

Watercolour Challenge is a daytime television lifestyle game show that originally aired on Channel 4 from 15 June 1998 to 23 November 2001 and presented by Hannah Gordon. In 2022, the show returned for 20 episodes on Channel 5 and was presented by Fern Britton.

== Format ==
In the programme, three amateur artists were given four hours to paint, in watercolour, the same scene or landscape, often with widely different interpretations. A programme was screened each day when at the end of each episode, the guest professional artist for the week judged the paintings and selected the winner, who would then appear in a regional final on Friday, and if successful would compete in the end of series final.

The expert artist also had a segment where they provided tips for the viewers to improve their painting technique.

The locations of each landscape painted changed in each episode, with various regions of both Great Britain and Ireland being visited, as well as a special show from Provence. The 2001 final was held in Tuscany.

Expert art judges included the artists Jason Bowyer, Mike Chaplin, Dorothy Dunnett, Annette Kane, Hazel Soan, and Jenny Wheatley. In 1999, Timmy Mallett was a regional judge for one episode of the show. A celebrity edition was produced, including Bill Oddie and Phillip Franks. The show was briefly presented by Cherie Lunghi, when Hannah Gordon was unable to do so due to illness.

In 2001, the programme won a Royal Television Society (RTS) award in the category of Best Features - Daytime.

== Transmissions ==
=== Original ===
Series	Start date	End date	Episodes	Presenter
1	15 June 1998	4 September 1998	49	Hannah Gordon
2	2 June 1999	29 October 1999	60	Hannah Gordon
3	16 October 2000	22 December 2000	50	Hannah Gordon
4	3 September 2001	23 November 2001	51	Hannah Gordon

=== Revival ===
Series	Start date	End date	Episodes	Presenter
1	17 January 2022	11 February 2022	20	Fern Britton

== Books ==
Two books related to the television programme have been published:

- Watercolour Challenge: A Complete Guide to Watercolour Painting, 2001, Diana Vowles, Channel 4 Books, ISBN 0752261762, 978-0752261768
- Watercolour Challenge: Practical Painting Course, 2002, Channel 4 Books, ISBN 0752262084, 978-0752262086
