= Fern Britton =

English television presenter and author (born 1957)

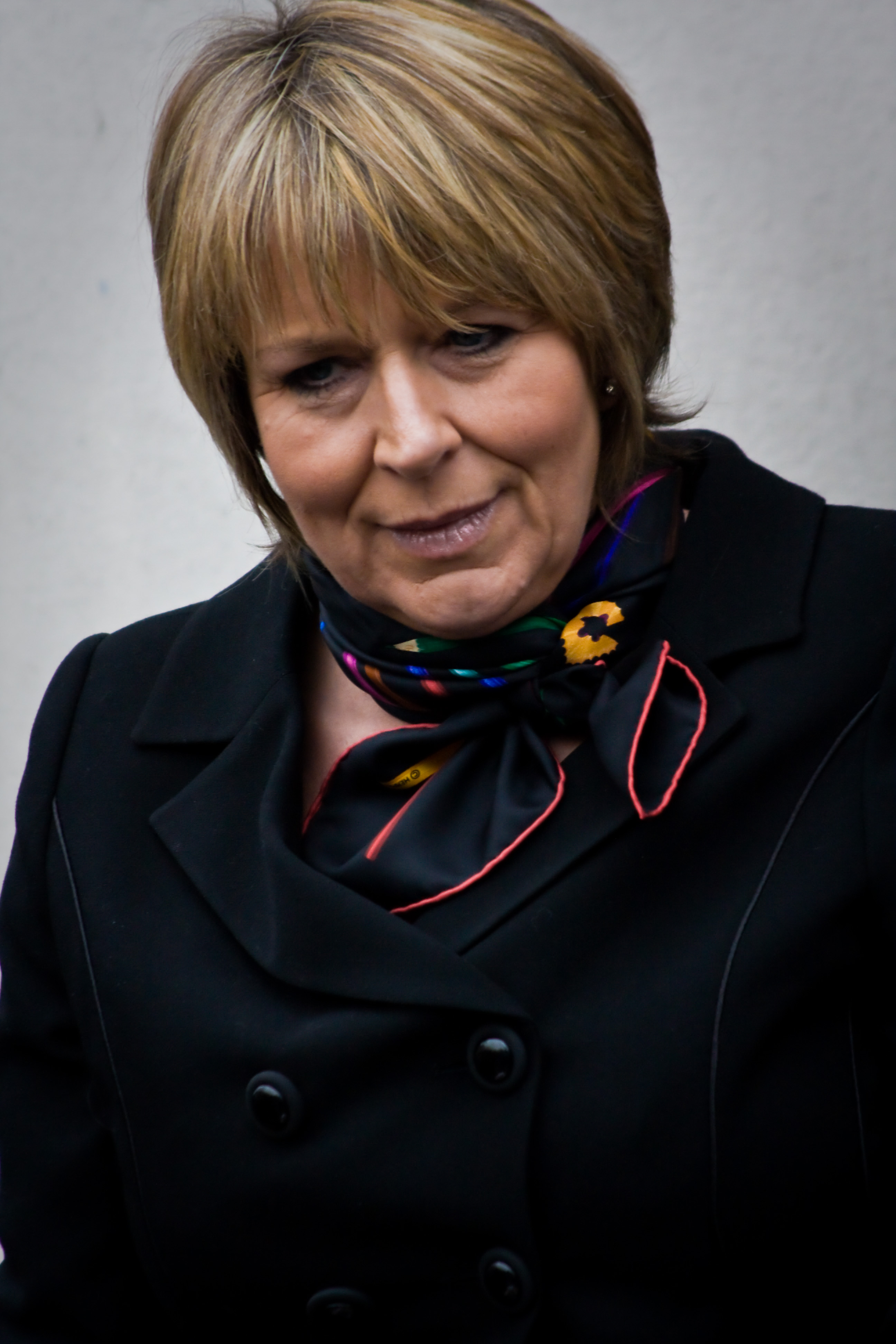
- Britton in 2009
- Born: 17 July 1957 (age 69); Ealing, London, England
- Education: Royal Central School of Speech and Drama
- Occupations: Television presenter; author
- Years active: 1980–present
- Television: Ready Steady Cook; This Morning; All Star Mr & Mrs; Fern; Fern Britton Meets... The Big Allotment Challenge; Watercolour Challenge
- Spouses: Clive Jones (m. 1988; div. 2000) Phil Vickery (m. 2000; sep. 2020)
- Children: 4
- Parent: Tony Britton (father)
- Relatives: Jasper Britton (half-brother)

Fern Britton (born 17 July 1957) is an English television presenter and author. After beginning her career as a continuity announcer and a newsreader, she went on to co-present Breakfast Time in the 1980s and hosted the cookery game show Ready Steady Cook between 1994 and 2000 on BBC One. Britton presented the ITV daytime programme This Morning from 1999 to 2009. She also co-presented the British Soap Awards between 2006 and 2008 and All Star Mr & Mrs between 2008 and 2010.

Following her departure from This Morning, she went on to present Fern Britton Meets... for the BBC between 2009 and 2017 and Fern for Channel 4 in 2011. She also presented The Big Allotment Challenge for the BBC between 2014 and 2015 and fronted a revival of Watercolour Challenge for Channel 5 in 2022. Britton is also an author, having published a number of bestselling novels and books varying from short stories to non-fiction, several of which have featured in The Sunday Times bestseller list. She also appeared as a contestant on the tenth series of Strictly Come Dancing in 2012, and was a housemate on the twenty-third series of Celebrity Big Brother in 2024.

== Early life ==
Fern Britton was born on 17 July 1957 in Ealing, West London, to actor Tony Britton and his first wife, Ruth (née Hawkins). She has an older sister and a younger half-brother Jasper, an actor, from her father's second marriage. She attended Dr Challoner's High School in Little Chalfont, Buckinghamshire, and the Central School of Speech and Drama, where she trained in stage management.

== Career ==
After working with The Cambridge Theatre Company, Britton subsequently began her broadcasting career in March 1980 in Plymouth working for Westward Television, the then-incumbent ITV regional company, as a continuity announcer and newsreader on the weeknightly local bulletin Westward Diary. After Westward lost its franchise at the end of 1981, Britton moved to the local BBC headquarters as a presenter with Spotlight in the South West, before moving to BBC 1's Breakfast Time, where she became the BBC's youngest-ever national news presenter. She was also a stand-in co-presenter on News After Noon during this period.

Britton then worked for TVS in Southampton, co-hosting the South edition of the news programme Coast to Coast with Fred Dinenage, as well as Coast to Coast People, The Television Show, Magic Moments and, as presenter with Stefan Buczacki, of That's Gardening. She stayed until TVS's franchise ended in December 1992. In 1988, Britton took part in Cinderella, a pantomime in which she played the role of Dandini at the Mayflower Theatre in Southampton. She was presenting Coast to Coast from the city at the time and her preparation for the part was filmed for the programme.

In January 1993, she joined London News Network's London Tonight, before moving in April 1993 to GMTV to present the post-9:00 am slot, Top of the Morning. Britton moved back to Carlton Television to present After Five in 1994. She also appeared in the first two series of The Brian Conley Show. From 1994, Britton presented the television cookery gameshow Ready Steady Cook, which she continued until 2000, however she returned to the show in an episode of the primetime celebrity edition as a celebrity contestant in 2001. Britton had guest presented This Morning since 1993, but from September 1999 she became a full-time host presenting the Friday edition with John Leslie. In 2002, she became the main host of the series along with John Leslie and, later, with Phillip Schofield.

In 2002, Britton was the subject of This Is Your Life when she was surprised by Michael Aspel at Wickham Hospital in Buckinghamshire. In 2006, Britton co-presented the reality television show Soapstar Superstar. On 31 May 2007, she hosted the Classical Brit Awards at the Royal Albert Hall and she also co-hosted The British Soap Awards from 2006 until 2008 with Phillip Schofield. Britton has appeared twice as a panellist on the BBC show, Have I Got News for You, and guest presented on 27 April 2007 and on 17 October 2008.

In 2007, Britton presented her own ITV Saturday night series called That's What I Call Television. In each show, she was joined by a celebrity co-host who selected their favourite TV moments from the 1980s and then reunited some of the original stars of selected shows. Julian Clary was her first co-host, followed by Matthew Kelly on the second show, and finally Bradley Walsh for the third. In December 2007, a Christmas edition was broadcast with co-host Ronnie Corbett, and a week later another was broadcast, this time with Desmond Lynam. Britton has featured in advertisements for several companies and causes, including appearances as herself in advertisements for several Ryvita products including Ryvita Minis, and in the 2007 What's it going to take? campaign for the charitable organisation Women's Aid.

From 2008 until 2010, Britton co-presented a revival of the ITV show Mr & Mrs; this time it was an "All Star" version. She co-hosted the show with Phillip Schofield. In November 2008, Britton announced she was to take a break from This Morning and return after the Christmas break in January 2009. Britton announced on 25 March 2009 that she was leaving This Morning, after 10 years, at the end of the current series. Two days after quitting This Morning, Britton pulled out of hosting the 2009 British Soap Awards alongside co-host Phillip Schofield. On 17 July 2009, Britton's 52nd birthday, her farewell This Morning programme was aired. Britton made her comeback to ITV in 2017, presenting daytime series Culinary Genius. She also presented A Right Royal Quiz for the channel.

Between 2009 and 2017, Britton hosted a series for BBC One titled Fern Britton Meets... in which she interviewed high-profile personalities about their religious beliefs. The series attracted particular attention for an interview with former Prime Minister Tony Blair, in which he said he still would have thought it right that Iraqi president Saddam Hussein be removed even without evidence he had weapons of mass destruction. The same year, Britton returned to the BBC and was a team captain on the BBC One trivia panel show As Seen on TV. In November 2009, Britton appeared as a stand-in host on The Paul O'Grady Show for two weeks.

In February 2011, it was confirmed that Britton would be taking over the 5:00 pm chatshow slot on Channel 4 that Paul O'Grady previously hosted. The show, Fern, began on 28 March 2011. The programme drew low audience figures and was reported to be facing a revamp, change of timeslot or cancellation after its second week on air. The show has since been confirmed as axed in its present form but Britton may work on other projects for Channel 4. In May 2011, Britton played herself in a short independently made film by Mark Davenport called Photoshopping alongside lead Joan Kempson.

In September 2012, Britton was announced as one of the 14 celebrities taking part in the tenth series of Strictly Come Dancing. Her professional partner was Artem Chigvintsev and they were the fifth couple to be eliminated from the competition. In 2015, Britton accused Chigvintsev of kicking and shoving her during the training sessions they held while they were dance partners on Strictly Come Dancing in 2012, though Chigvintsev would deny the claim. According to Britton, Chigvintsev even joked that he would kill her.

Between 2014 and 2015, Britton presented The Big Allotment Challenge for BBC Two. The series was commissioned for a second series which aired in early 2015. In January 2016, she began presenting the BBC One antiques game show For What It's Worth. In January 2018, it was announced that Britton would play Marie in the touring production of Calendar Girls The Musical. In 2022, Britton presented a revival series of Watercolour Challenge on Channel 5. She also fronted Fishing Scotland's Lochs & Rivers and two series of My Cornwall with Fern Britton.

In March 2024, Britton entered the Celebrity Big Brother house to participate as a housemate in its twenty-third series. Throughout the series, she survived the most evictions and reached the final, where she finished in fifth place. A year later, it was announced that Britton would front a new ITV series Fern Britton: Inside the Vet's.

=== Writing ===
In March 1998, Britton released her first book, Fern's Family Favourites, published by André Deutsch and written with the cook and home economist Susie Magasiner. In November 2008, Fern, My Story was published by Michael Joseph. It went straight into The Sunday Times Top Ten Bestseller list where it remained for 12 weeks. Britton has written eleven novels New Beginnings (2011), Hidden Treasures (2012), The Holiday Home (2013), A Seaside Affair (2014), A Good Catch (2015), The Postcard (2016), Coming Home (2018), The Newcomer (2019), Daughters of Cornwall (2020), The Good Servant (2022) and A Cornish Legacy (2025), several of which have been in The Sunday Times bestseller list. Whilst her short stories include The Stolen Weekend and A Cornish Carol (2014), The Beach Cabin (2015), A Cornish Gift (2017) and The Great Cornish Getaway (2018). In 2016, she signed a three-book deal with the publishers HarperCollins.

== Personal life ==
Britton's first marriage was to television executive Clive Jones. The couple met while Jones was still married and began an affair. Britton broke off their affair after a year but Jones turned up on her doorstep two days later, after leaving his wife for her. They married on 12 November 1988 in Southsea and have three children together: twin sons and a daughter. Britton and Jones separated in January 1998. A year later, Britton began dating celebrity chef Phil Vickery after they met on the set of BBC Two's Ready Steady Cook. After her divorce from Jones was finalised, they married in spring 2000. They have one daughter together, born 2001. In January 2020, Britton and Vickery announced their separation after twenty years of marriage. Britton subsequently relocated to Cornwall. Between 2021 and 2023, Britton was stalked by a man who sent her flowers and stayed in her holiday cottage. He was given a ten-year restraining order and was banned from entering Cornwall, as well as having to complete 150 hours of unpaid work.

== Filmography ==
Year	Title	Channel	Role	Notes
1983	The Adventure Game	BBC	Contestant	1 episode
1984–1992	Coast to Coast	TVS	Newsreader	2 series
1993–1994	Top of the Morning	GMTV	Presenter	Multiple series
1994–2000	Ready Steady Cook	BBC Two	Presenter	7 series; 771 episodes
1999–2009	This Morning	ITV	Co-presenter	with John Leslie (1999–2002); Phillip Schofield (2002–2009)
2005	Emmerdale	ITV	Guest star	
2006	Soapstar Superstar	ITV	Co-presenter	1 series; with Ben Shephard
2006	Looking Good, Feeling Great	ITV	Presenter	1 series
2006–2008	The British Soap Awards	ITV	Co-presenter	3 episodes; with Phillip Schofield
2007	Classic Brit Awards	ITV	Presenter	1 episode
2007	That's What I Call Television	ITV	Presenter	6 episodes
2008–2010	All Star Mr & Mrs	ITV	Co-presenter	3 series; with Phillip Schofield
2009	As Seen on TV	BBC One	Team captain	1 series
2009	The Paul O'Grady Show	Channel 4	Stand-in presenter	1 episode
2009–2017	Fern Britton Meets...	BBC One	Presenter	9 series
2011	Fern	Channel 4	Presenter	1 series
2012	Strictly Come Dancing	BBC One	Contestant	Series 10
2014–2015	The Big Allotment Challenge	BBC Two	Presenter	2 series
2016	For What It's Worth	BBC One	Presenter	2 series
2017	Fern Britton's Holy Land Journey	BBC One	Presenter	Documentary
2017	Culinary Genius	ITV	Presenter	1 series
2017	A Right Royal Quiz	ITV	Presenter	One-off special
2021	Fishing Scotland's Lochs & Rivers	Channel 5	Herself	5 episodes
2021–2023	My Cornwall with Fern Britton	Channel 5	Presenter	2 series
2022	Watercolour Challenge	Channel 5	Presenter	Revival; 20 episodes
2023	No Place Like Home	Channel 5	Herself	1 episode
2023	Britain's Best Places to Live 2023	Channel 5	Presenter	With Ore Oduba and Sunetra Sarker
2024	Celebrity Big Brother	ITV	Herself	Housemate; series 23
2025	Fern Britton: Inside the Vet's	ITV	Presenter	1 series

== Bibliography ==
=== Novels ===
- New Beginnings (2011)
- Hidden Treasures (2012)
- The Holiday Home (2013)
- A Seaside Affair (2014)
- A Good Catch (2015)
- The Postcard (2016)
- Coming Home (2018)
- The Newcomer (2019)
- Daughters of Cornwall (2020)
- The Good Servant (2022)
- A Cornish Legacy (2025)

=== Short stories ===
- The Stolen Weekend (2014)
- A Cornish Carol (2014)
- The Beach Cabin (2015)
- A Cornish Gift (2017)
- The Great Cornish Getaway (2018)

=== Non-fiction ===
- Fern's Family Favourites (1998)
- Winter Treats and Summer Delights (with Susie Magasiner) (1999)
- Fern and Phil's Family Food (with Phil Vickery) (2003)
- Fern: The Autobiography (2008)
