= Lucas Bergvall =

Swedish footballer (born 2006)

- Bergvall with Sweden in 2026

Personal information
- Full name: Lucas Erik Holger Bergvall
- Date of birth: 2 February 2006 (age 20)
- Place of birth: Stockholm, Sweden
- Height: 1.87 m (6 ft 2 in)
- Position: Midfielder

Team information
- Current team: Tottenham Hotspur
- Number: 15

Youth career
- 2013–2021: IF Brommapojkarna

Senior career*
Years	Team	Apps	(Gls)
2021–2022	IF Brommapojkarna	12	(1)
2023–2024	Djurgården	37	(5)
2024–	Tottenham Hotspur	55	(1)

International career^{‡}
2021–2022	Sweden U17	8	(3)
2022–2023	Sweden U19	4	(0)
2023–	Sweden U21	5	(1)
2024–	Sweden	18	(0)
- * Club domestic league appearances and goals as of 23:24, 21 November 2026 (UTC) ‡ National team caps and goals as of 18:18, 6 October 2026 (UTC)

Lucas Erik Holger Bergvall (Swedish: [ˈlu:kɑs bæ̌ɾj:vɑl]; born 2 February 2006) is a Swedish professional footballer who plays as a midfielder for Premier League club Tottenham Hotspur and the Sweden national team.

== Club career ==
=== IF Brommapojkarna ===
Born and raised in Stockholm, Bergvall advanced through the academy of IF Brommapojkarna, where he was part of the winning team of the 2019 U13 Madrid Football Cup, beating youth teams from the academies of Bayern Munich, Atlético Madrid, Paris Saint-Germain, and Barcelona. Bergvall made his Superettan debut for Brommapojkarna on 9 July 2022 in a 1–1 draw with Örgryte. On 4 October 2022, he scored his first professional goal against Öster. Heavily scouted in his youth, Bergvall participated in trials at Juventus, Manchester United, and Bayern Munich during his time at Brommapojkarna.

=== Djurgården ===
Bergvall joined Djurgården on 9 December 2022 and made his debut as a starter for the team in Allsvenskan in the game against champions Häcken on 24 May 2023. After a strong contribution in Djurgården's 1–0 victory, Swedish newspaper Aftonbladet described Bergvall as the man of the match and forecast that he would become "Djurgården's biggest transfer ever". On 11 October 2023, he was named by English newspaper The Guardian as one of the best players born in 2006 worldwide. Bergvall made 37 league appearances in total, scoring five goals and providing two assists.

=== Tottenham Hotspur ===
==== 2024–25: Debut and Player of the Season ====
On 2 February 2024, Tottenham Hotspur agreed to a five-year deal to sign Bergvall for a reported transfer fee of £8.5 million, competing with Barcelona for his signature. He officially joined the club on 1 July 2024. On 17 July 2024, he made his first Spurs appearance as a half-time substitute in a 5–1 pre-season friendly victory against Heart of Midlothian; in the 66th minute he assisted Mikey Moore to put Tottenham up 3–1. On 20 July 2024, Bergvall was granted a spot in the Starting XI for a friendly match against Queens Park Rangers; in the 24th minute he went down with an undisclosed injury.

Bergvall made his Premier League and competitive debut for Tottenham as a 78th minute substitute in a 1-1 away draw to Leicester City. Bergvall's first start for the club came in a 2–1 EFL Cup victory against Coventry City on 18 September 2024. He made his UEFA Europa League debut soon after against Qarabağ, but was subbed off within 12 minutes following a red card to Radu Drăgușin. On 8 January 2025, he scored his first goal for Tottenham in a 1–0 win against Liverpool in the first leg of the EFL Cup semi-final.

On 29 April 2025, Bergvall signed a new contract with Tottenham, which is set to expire in 2031. On 1 May, Bergvall suffered an ankle injury during training, having to use crutches while attending Tottenham's 3–1 Europa League semi-final first leg victory against Bodø/Glimt. Head coach Ange Postecoglou revealed that Bergvall had sustained damage to the ligaments in his ankle and would miss the remainder of the season. On 15 May, Bergvall was voted as Tottenham Official Supporters' Club Player of the Season, as well as One Hotspur Members and One Hotspur Juniors Player of the Season for the 2024–25 season. Bergvall was also nominated for the 2025 Golden Boy which recognises the best under-21 player in European football, finishing tenth in final voting.

==== 2025–present ====
On 13 September 2025, Bergvall scored his first Premier League goal for Tottenham in a 3–0 win away against West Ham United, and was awarded Player of the Match. He became the second-youngest Tottenham player to score and assist in a Premier League game. On 16 September, Bergvall made his UEFA Champions League debut in a 1–0 home victory against Villarreal, creating the chance that led to Villarreal goalkeeper Luiz Júnior fumbling the ball into his own net, resulting in the only goal of the match. He was subsequently awarded Player of the Match. On 1 November, Bergvall suffered a concussion early in a 1–0 loss to Chelsea, keeping him out of action for a few weeks in compliance with the FA's 'Graduated return to play' (GRTP) programme.

On 11 September 2026, Bergvall signed a contract extension with the club.

== International career ==
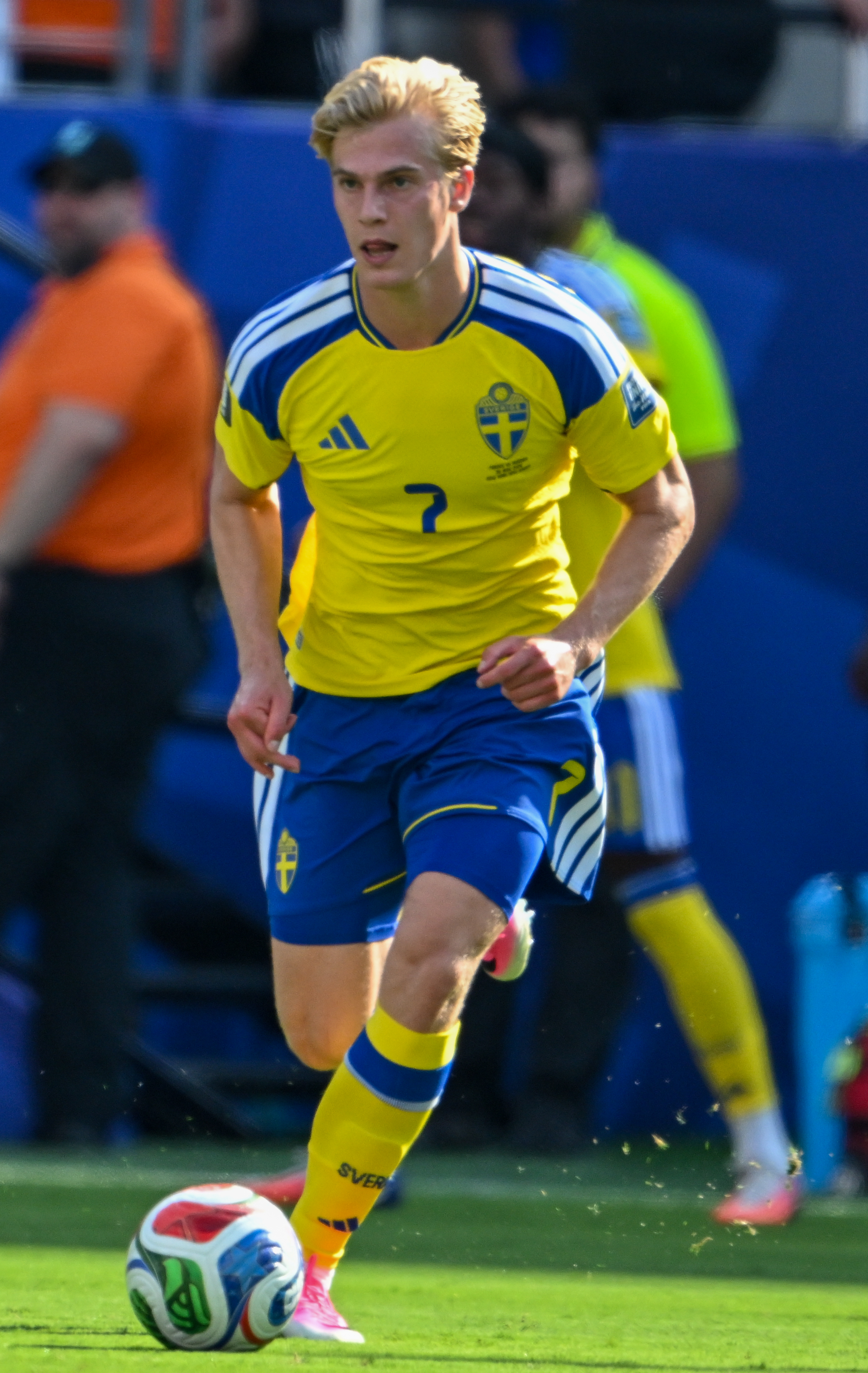
Bergvall with Sweden at the 2026 FIFA World Cup

Bergvall has represented Sweden at various youth levels, ranging from under-15 until under-21. On 12 January 2024, he made his senior debut as a second-half substitute in a 2–1 friendly victory against Estonia.

On 12 May 2026, Bergvall was named in the Sweden squad for the 2026 FIFA World Cup. On 14 June 2026, he made his World Cup debut for Sweden against Tunisia at the age of 20 years and 132 days, becoming the youngest Swedish player to appear in a World Cup, surpassing Jesper Blomqvist's previous record from 1994 by two days.

== Personal life ==
Bergvall comes from a football-centric family. Both his older brother, Theo, and his younger brother, Rasmus, are also professional footballers. As of 2024, he is dating Swedish model Mackenzie Medlock, his high school sweetheart.

Growing up, Bergvall supported Manchester United. He participated in two trials with the club in 2020 and 2022 but was unable to join following regulations that were imposed on English clubs after the United Kingdom's withdrawal from the European Union which prevented them from signing foreign under-18 players to their academies.

== Career statistics ==
=== Club ===
As of match played 21 November 2026

Appearances and goals by club, season and competition
Club	Season	League			National cup (Note: Includes Svenska Cupen, FA Cup)		League cup (Note: Includes EFL Cup)		Europe		Other		Total	
Club	Season	Division	Apps	Goals	Apps	Goals	Apps	Goals	Apps	Goals	Apps	Goals	Apps	Goals
Brommapojkarna	2021	Ettan Norra	1	0	0	0	—		—		—		1	0
Brommapojkarna	2022	Superettan	11	1	1	0	—		—		—		12	1
Brommapojkarna	Total		12	1	1	0	—		—		—		13	1
Djurgårdens IF	2023	Allsvenskan	25	2	3	1	—		1 (Note: Appearance in UEFA Europa Conference League)	0	—		29	3
Djurgårdens IF	2024	Allsvenskan	12	3	6	3	—		—		—		18	6
Djurgårdens IF	Total		37	5	9	4	—		1	0	—		47	9
Tottenham Hotspur	2024–25	Premier League	27	0	2	0	4	1	12 (Note: Appearances in UEFA Europa League)	0	—		45	1
Tottenham Hotspur	2025–26	Premier League	23	1	0	0	2	0	7 (Note: Appearances in UEFA Champions League)	0	1 (Note: Appearance in UEFA Super Cup)	0	33	1
Tottenham Hotspur	2026–27	Premier League	5	0	0	0	2	0	—		—		7	0
Tottenham Hotspur	Total		55	1	2	0	8	1	19	0	1	0	85	2
Career total			104	7	12	4	8	1	20	0	1	0	145	12

=== International ===
As of match played 5 October 2026

Appearances and goals by national team and year
National team	Year	Apps	Goals
Sweden	2024	4	0
Sweden	2025	2	0
Sweden	2026	12	0
Total		18	0

== Honours ==
IF Brommapojkarna

- Superettan: 2022
- Ettan Norra: 2021

Tottenham Hotspur

- UEFA Europa League: 2024–25
- UEFA Super Cup: runner up 2025

Individual

- Tottenham Hotspur Official Supporters' Club Player of the Season: 2024–25
