= The Big Allotment Challenge =

- Presented by: Fern Britton
- Judges: Jim Buttress; Jonathan Moseley; Thane Prince
- Country of origin: United Kingdom
- Original language: English
- No. of series: 2
- No. of episodes: 12

Production
- Running time: 60 minutes
- Production company: Silver River Productions

Original release
- Network: BBC Two
- Release: 15 April 2014 – 17 February 2015

The Big Allotment Challenge is a British game show that has aired on BBC Two between 15 April 2014 and 17 February 2015. It is hosted by Fern Britton and is about gardening in Britain.

The three judges are Jim Buttress (for the "grow challenge", involving fruit and vegetables), Jonathan Moseley (for the "make challenge", involving flowers) and Thane Prince (for the "eat challenge", involving food).

== Production ==
The series was announced on 22 August 2013 by Janice Hadlow, the BBC Two controller. The gardeners have four months in Oxfordshire to grow their fruits and vegetables.

== Episode Guide ==
=== Transmissions ===
Series	Start date	End date	Episodes
1	15 April 2014	15 May 2014	6
2	2 January 2015	17 February 2015	6

=== Series 1 (2014) ===
In Oxfordshire, nine pairs of gardeners competed in The Big Allotment Challenge 2014. Only one team could win and after each episode, one team left the series.

Couple	Result
Alex and Ed	Winners on 15 May 2014
Kate and Eleanor	Runners-up on 15 May 2014
Rupert and Dimi	Runners-up on 15 May 2014
Gary and Peter	Eliminated 5th on 13 May 2014
Jo and Avril	Eliminated 5th on 13 May 2014
Shirley and Victoria	Eliminated 4th on 6 May 2014
Sally and Michelle	Eliminated 3rd on 29 April 2014
Edd and Harshani	Eliminated 2nd on 22 April 2014
Shaun and Liz	Eliminated 1st on 15 April 2014

==== Elimination table ====
	W1	W2	W3	W4	W5	W6
Alex and Ed	Flowers			F/M	Veg	V/E/WIN
Kate and Eleanor		Make	V/F	Veg	Flowers	F/OUT
Rupert and Dimi	Make	Eat			Make	M/OUT
Gary and Peter	Eat			Eat	OUT	
Jo and Avril		Flowers	M/E		E/OUT	
Shirley and Victoria	Veg	Veg		OUT		
Sally and Michelle			OUT			
Edd and Harshani		OUT				
Shaun and Liz	OUT					

The contestant got to the next round.
The contestant won one challenge.
The contestant won two challenges
The contestant was eliminated without winning any challenges
The contestant was eliminated despite winning a challenge
The contestant won the competition.

Episode	Grow (Veg)	Grow (Flowers)	Make	Eat
1	Radishes (Shirley and Victoria)	Sweet peas (Alex and Ed)	Floral bouquet (Rupert and Dimi)	Fruit jam and Fruit curd (Gary and Pete)
2	Runner beans (Shirley and Victoria)	Roses (Jo and Avril)	Summer wreath (Kate and Eleanor)	Relish (Rupert and Dimi)
3	Carrots (Kate and Eleanor)	Gladioli (Kate and Eleanor)	Table arrangement (Jo and Avril)	Chutney and Cordial (Jo and Avril)
4	Aubergine (Kate and Eleanor)	Sunflower (Alex and Ed)	Topiary tree (Alex and Ed)	Pickles and Piccalillies (Gary and Pete)
5	Onions (Kate and Eleanor)	Chrysanthemums (Alex and Ed)	Pedestal (Rupert and Dimi)	Jellies and Fruit butters (Jo and Avril)
6	Melon and Sweetcorn (Alex and Ed)	Dahlia (Kate and Eleanor)	A suspended hanging design (Rupert and DImi)	Gift basket (Alex and Ed)

=== Series 2 (2015) ===
In Oxfordshire, nine gardeners competed in The Big Allotment Challenge 2015.

The winner was Rob Smith, a 35-year old from Sheffield, who works as a cabin crew member for Virgin Atlantic.

Gardener	Result
Rob	Winner on 7 February 2015
Jo Jo	Runner up on 7 February 2015
Sandra	Runner up on 7 February 2015
Alan	Eliminated 5th on 30 January 2015
Lena	Eliminated 5th on 30 January 2015
Rekha	Eliminated 4th on 23 January 2015
Alexandra	Eliminated 3rd on 16 January 2015
Tony	Eliminated 2nd on 9 January 2015
Matt	Eliminated 1st on 2 January 2015

Episode	Grow	Make	Eat
1	New potatoes (Jo Jo)	Zinnia basket arrangements (Rob)	Sauce and mustard (Lena)
2	Cucumber (Rob)	Larkspur bound bouquet (Alan)	Lolly and syrup (Sandra)
3	Peas (Jo Jo)	Lily floral candelabra (Sandra)	Dip and crisp (Rekha)
4	Tomato (Jo Jo)	Rudbeckia stacked flowerpot (Rob)	Sweet and savoury jams (Alan)
5	Okra (Lena)	Helichrysum table swag (Sandra)	Pickles and chutneys (Jo Jo)
6	Cauliflower and cape gooseberries (Rob and Sandra respectively)	Perpetual carnation and floral arch (Rob)	Canapés, cocktails and confectionery (Jo Jo)
