= Fern Britton Meets... =

- Genre: Religion and ethics
- Presented by: Fern Britton
- Country of origin: United Kingdom
- Original language: English
- No. of series: 9
- No. of episodes: 37

Production
- Producer: Anna Cox
- Running time: 60 minutes

Original release
- Network: BBC One
- Release: 29 November 2009 – 17 December 2017

Fern Britton Meets... is a British television talk show presented by Fern Britton which was first aired on BBC One during the four Sundays of Advent from 29 November 2009 to 17 December 2017. Each episode featured Britton interviewing a high-profile person about their life, career and religious beliefs. The programme attracted particular attention following an interview with former British Prime Minister Tony Blair in which he discussed his thoughts about the 2003 invasion of Iraq.

== Summary ==
Each episode features Britton interviewing a different personality, with the discussion focussed on how the individual's beliefs have shaped their lives. The programme was the first to be presented by Britton since leaving the ITV daytime show This Morning earlier in the year.

The series was announced in November 2009, and Britton said:

All the interviewees come from very different backgrounds but what binds them together is the fact that, although their faith has been challenged, they've emerged with strong spiritual beliefs.

== Episodes ==
Series	Episodes	Originally released	
Series	Episodes	First released	Last released
1	4	29 November 2009	20 December 2009
2	4	28 November 2010	19 December 2010
3	4	27 November 2011	18 December 2011
4	5	25 November 2012	23 December 2012
5	4	1 December 2013	22 December 2013
6	4	30 November 2014	21 December 2014
7	4	29 November 2015	20 December 2015
8	4	27 November 2016	18 December 2016
9	4	26 November 2017	17 December 2017

=== Series 1 ===
No. overall	No. in series	Guest	Original release date
1	1	Dolly Parton	29 November 2009
2	2	Desmond Tutu	6 December 2009
3	3	Tony Blair	13 December 2009
4	4	Sheila Hancock	20 December 2009

=== Series 2 (2010) ===
No. overall	No. in series	Guest	Original release date
5	1	June Brown	28 November 2010
6	2	Clarissa Dickson Wright	5 December 2010
7	3	Jesse Jackson	12 December 2010
8	4	Cliff Richard	19 December 2010

=== Series 3 (2011) ===
No. overall	No. in series	Guest	Interviewees	Original release date
9	1	Ann Widdecombe	Nicholas Kochan (Biographer); Rev Roger Widdecombe (Nephew); Helen Williams (School Friend); Gyles Brandreth; Lord David Alton of Liverpool; Anton Du Beke (Dancer)	27 November 2011
10	2	Katherine Jenkins	Susan Jenkins(Mother); Niki Sanderson (Publicist); Polly Noble (Friend); Eamonn Holmes (TV Presenter); Beatrice Unsworth (Singing Teacher); Colin Jackson (Athlete and Friend); Tom Chambers (Actor and Friend); Neil Fisher (The Times); Mark Cann (British Forces Foundation)	4 December 2011
11	3	Russell Watson	Tim Watson (Dad); Steve Gleave (Friend); Rob Gleave (Friend); Pete Reeves (DJ Piccadilly Radio); Gordon Burns(Journalist); Paul Hince (Sports Journalist); James Leggate (Consultant Neurosurgeon)	11 December 2011
12	4	Brian Blessed	Stephen Fry (Friend); Susan Engel (Actor and Friend); John Paul Davidson (Friend); Virginia McKenna (Actor and Friend); Ros Blessed (Daughter); Mark Lawson (Critic and Broadcaster); Sir Trevor Nunn (Director Cats)	18 December 2011

=== Series 4 (2012) ===
No. overall	No. in series	Guest	Interviewees	Original release date
13	1	Alfie Boe	Neil Ferris (Manager); John Owen Edward (D'Oyly Carte Opera); Annie Benson (Alfie's Sister); Ruth Carter (Preston Musical Comedy Society); Matt Lucas (Actor and Friend)	25 November 2012
14	2	John Barrowman	Eve Myles (Actress); Jodie Prenger (West End Actress); Carole E Barrowman (Sister); Myleene Klass (Friend); Bernard Cribbins (Actor); Phil Collinson (Producer); Scott Gill (Partner)	2 December 2012
15	3	Frank Bruno	Dave Davies (Frank's Agent); Sue Baker (Time to Change Campaign); Lynette Bruno (Frank's Mother); Colin Hart (Boxing Columnist, The Sun); Mike Jackson (Sporting Club Charity); Cass Pennant (Frank's Friend)	9 December 2012
16	4	Daniel O'Donnell	Gloria Hunniford (Friend); Eddie Rowland (Biographer); Margo O'Donnell (Daniel's Sister); PJ Sweeny (Friend); Majella O'Donnell (Daniel's Wife); Pat Gallagher (Daniel O'Donnell Visitor Centre)	16 December 2012
17	5	Dionne Warwick	David Elliott (Dionne's Son); Bette Midler (Singer and Actress); Mary Wilson (The Supremes); Burt Bacharach (Composer and Producer); Steve Tyrell (Promoter and Producer); Jools Holland (Musician and Presenter); Gail Mitchell (Billboard Magazine); Randy Lewis (LA Times); Barry Manilow (Singer)	23 December 2012

=== Series 5 (2013) ===
No. overall	No. in series	Guest	Interviewees	Original release date
18	1	Susan Boyle	Paul O'Grady (Presenter and Friend); Frank Quinn (University Lecturer and Friend); Lorraine Campbell (School Friend); Fred O'Neil (Singing Teacher); Elaine C Smith (actress); Yvie Burnett (Vocal Coach)	1 December 2013
19	2	John Simpson	John Humphrys (Journalist and Presenter); Nicholas Snowman (Friend); Brian Brooks (Family Friend); Julia Richards (Daughter); John Sergeant (News Correspondent and Presenter); Dee Kruger (TV Producer and John's second wife); Rev Dr Peter Elvy; Tom Giles (Editor, Panorama)	8 December 2013
20	3	Ken Dodd	Bishop James Jones(Friend); Lord Michael Grade (Broadcaster); Professor Ian Tracey (Friend and Liverpool Cathedral Organist); Elizabeth Threadgold (Friend and Cathedral Volunteer); Stephen Shakeshaft (Photographer); Laurie Mansfield (President The Royal Variety Performance); Roy Hudd (Comedian); Peter Grant (Journalist)	15 December 2013
21	4	Christine Ohuruogu	Obi Ohuruogu (Christine's brother); Perri Shakes-Drayton (400m European Indoor Champion); Rev Stennett Kirby (Vicar of All Saints Church, West Ham); Gabrielle Bramwell (Christine's Former Netball Coach); Lloyd Cowan (Christine's Coach); Brendan Foster CBE (Broadcaster and Olympic Bronze Medallist); Michael Beloff QC (Sports arbitration lawyer); Katharine Merry (Broadcaster and 400m Olympic Bronze Medallist)	22 December 2013

=== Series 6 (2014) ===
No. overall	No. in series	Guest	Interviewees	Original release date
22	1	Donny Osmond	Marie Osmond (Sister); Tony Prince (DJ Radio Luxembourg); Maureen O'Halloran (Fan Club Manager); David Hughes (Osmonds Press Officer); Nina Myskow (Editor, Jackie Magazine 1974 – 1978); Roger Holt (Promoter); Tina McKenzie (Fan)	30 November 2014
23	2	Nicholas Parsons	Admiral Sir John Treacher (Friend); Paul Merton (Comedian); Suzy Buchanan (Daughter); Justin Parsons (Son); Barry Cryer (Comedian); Carole Ashby (Sale of the Century Girl); Gyles Brandreth (Broadcaster); Jenny Eclaire (Comedian); Pam Ayres (Poet); Annie Parsons (Wife)	7 December 2014
24	3	Tanni Grey Thompson	Sian Harrison (Sister); Rt Hon Lord Neil Kinnock; Roy Anthony (First Coach); Nicola Jarvis (Friend and Former Paralympian); Martin Corck (Manager); David Moorcroft (Former Head of UK Athletics); Carys Grey-Thompson (Daughter); Baroness Hollins	14 December 2014
25	4	Richard Coles	Will Coles (Brother); Lorna Gradden (Manager, The Communards); Helen Fielding (Author, Bridget Jones's Diary); June Miles-Kingston (Drummer, The Communards); Annajoy David (Friend); Ian Hislop (Private Eye); Revd Kate Bottley (Gogglebox Vicar and Friend); Sarah Jane Morris (Singer, The Communards); Rev Giles Fraser (Friend); Sara Maitland (Religious Author and Friend); Chris Evans (Broadcaster)	21 December 2014

=== Series 7 (2015) ===
No. overall	No. in series	Guest	Interviewees	Original release date
26	1	Shane Lynch	Edele Lynch (Sister); Tara Lynch (Sister); Ronan Keating (Boyzone); Keith Duffy (Boyzone); Ben Ofoedu (Musician and Friend); Sheena Lynch (Wife)	29 November 2015
27	2	Linford Christie	Philip Henry (Friend); Briannah Christie (Daughter); Sally Gunnell(Runner); Brendan Foster (Commentator); Mihir Bose (Sports Journalist); Katharine Merry (Former Athlete); Margaret Adeoye (Athlete)	6 December 2015
28	3	Lord Paddy Ashdown	Tim Courtenay (Friend); Jane Ashdown (Wife); Keith Aston (Former colleague from Special Boat Section); Nick Clegg MP (Former Deputy Leader); Cathy Bakewell (Former Constituency Office Manager); Ian Patrick (Former Private Secretary); Martin Bell (Former War Reporter); Ian Patrick (Former Private Secretary)	13 December 2015
29	4	Baroness Karren Brady	Terry Brady (Dad); Rita Brady (Mum); Paul Peschisolido (Former Birmingham City Player); David Gold (Former Birmingham City Co-Chairman); Lord Alan Sugar; Suzanne Angelides (Friend); Tara Warren (West Ham United)	20 December 2015

=== Series 8 (2016) ===
No. overall	No. in series	Guest	Interviewees	Original release date
30	1	Alexander Armstrong	TBA	27 November 2016
31	2	Nigel Benn	TBA	4 December 2016
32	3	Michael Gove	Christine Gove (Mother); Sarah Vine (Wife); Mike Duncan (Teacher); Ed Vaizey MP (Friend); John Rentoul (Chief Political Correspondent for The Independent); Tim Shipman (Author of All Out War); Daniel Finkelstein (Associate Editor of The Times)	11 December 2016
33	4	Rebecca Ferguson	TBA	18 December 2016

=== Series 9 (2017) ===
No. overall	No. in series	Guest	Interviewees	Original release date
34	1	Gregory Porter	TBA	26 November 2017
35	2	Stef Reid	TBA	3 December 2017
36	3	Barbara Dickson	TBA	10 December 2017
37	4	Rose Hudson-Wilkin	TBA	17 December 2017

== Tony Blair interview ==
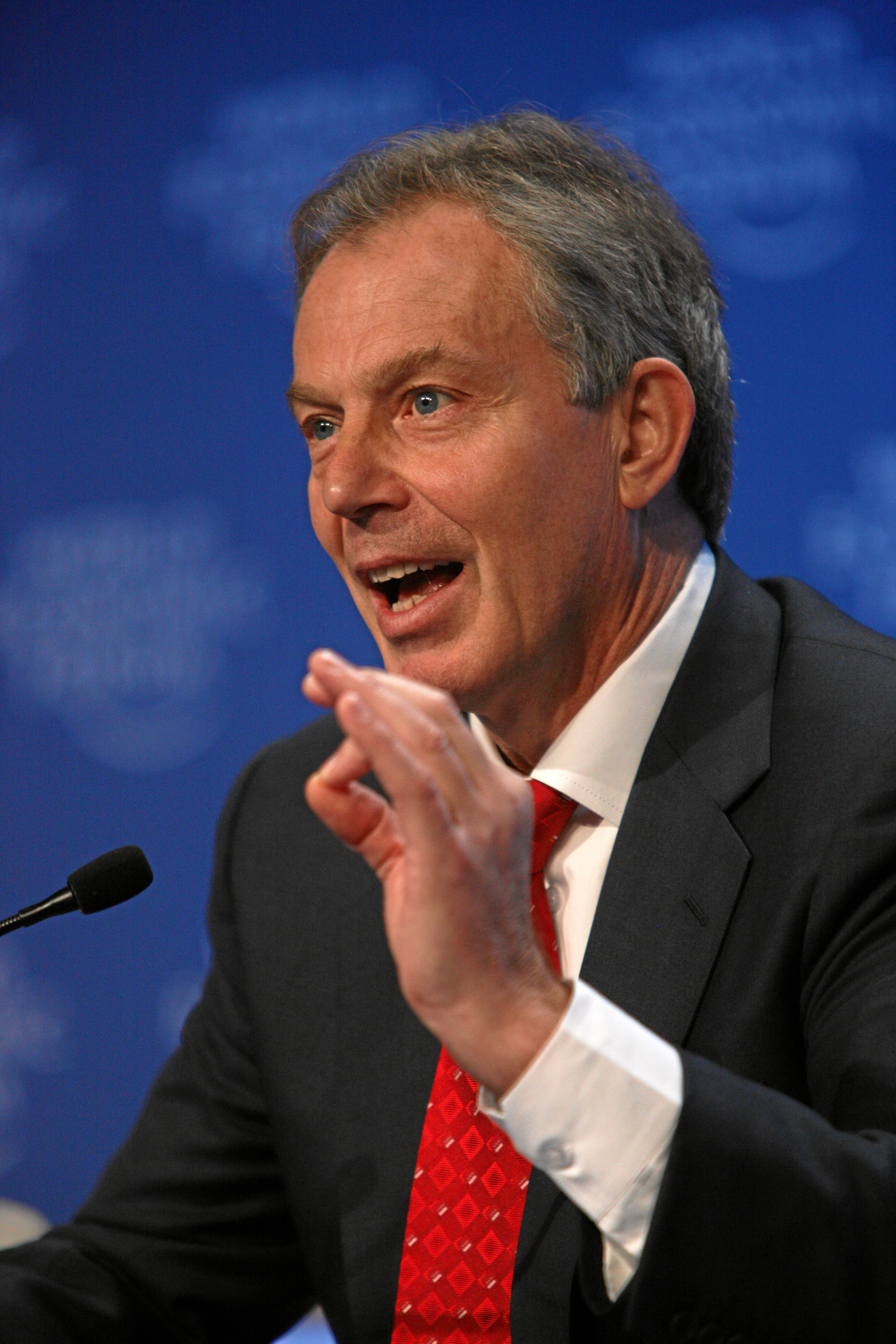
Tony Blair at the World Economic Forum, 2009. Blair spoke to Britton about the decision to join the 2003 invasion of Iraq.

The series attracted particular attention for an interview Britton recorded with Tony Blair which was aired on Sunday 13 December 2009, in which the former Prime Minister said that it would have been right to remove Iraqi president Saddam Hussein even without evidence he had weapons of mass destruction. Asked whether he would still have joined the 2003 invasion of Iraq had he known that there were no weapons, he said: "I would still have thought it right to remove him. I mean obviously you would have had to use and deploy different arguments, about the nature of the threat." [...] "I can't really think we'd be better with him and his two sons still in charge, but it's incredibly difficult.." [...] "That's why I sympathise with the people who were against [the war] for perfectly good reasons and are against it now, but for me, you know, in the end I had to take the decision."

Responding to the statement, former United Nations weapons inspector Hans Blix said that he believed Blair's statement had a "strong impression of a lack of sincerity", while former Liberal Democrat leader Sir Menzies Campbell said that Blair would not have obtained the support for an invasion if he had been so open about his view on regime change at the time. Conservative MP Richard Ottaway, a member of the House of Commons Intelligence and Security Committee dismissed the comments as a "cynical ploy to soften up public opinion" before his appearance at the Iraq Inquiry.

Giving evidence to the inquiry on 29 January 2010 Blair addressed the interview, saying that it had been recorded in July 2009, some months before the inquiry convened, and he admitted that it had been a mistake to say he would have got rid of Saddam Hussein regardless of whether or not he had WMD. He told the inquiry he "did not use the words regime change in that interview", and that what he had meant was that he "couldn't describe the nature of the threat in the same way if you knew then what you know now". Blair's performance was later condemned by families of military personnel killed in Iraq as disrespectful.
