= Hazel Soan =

British artist

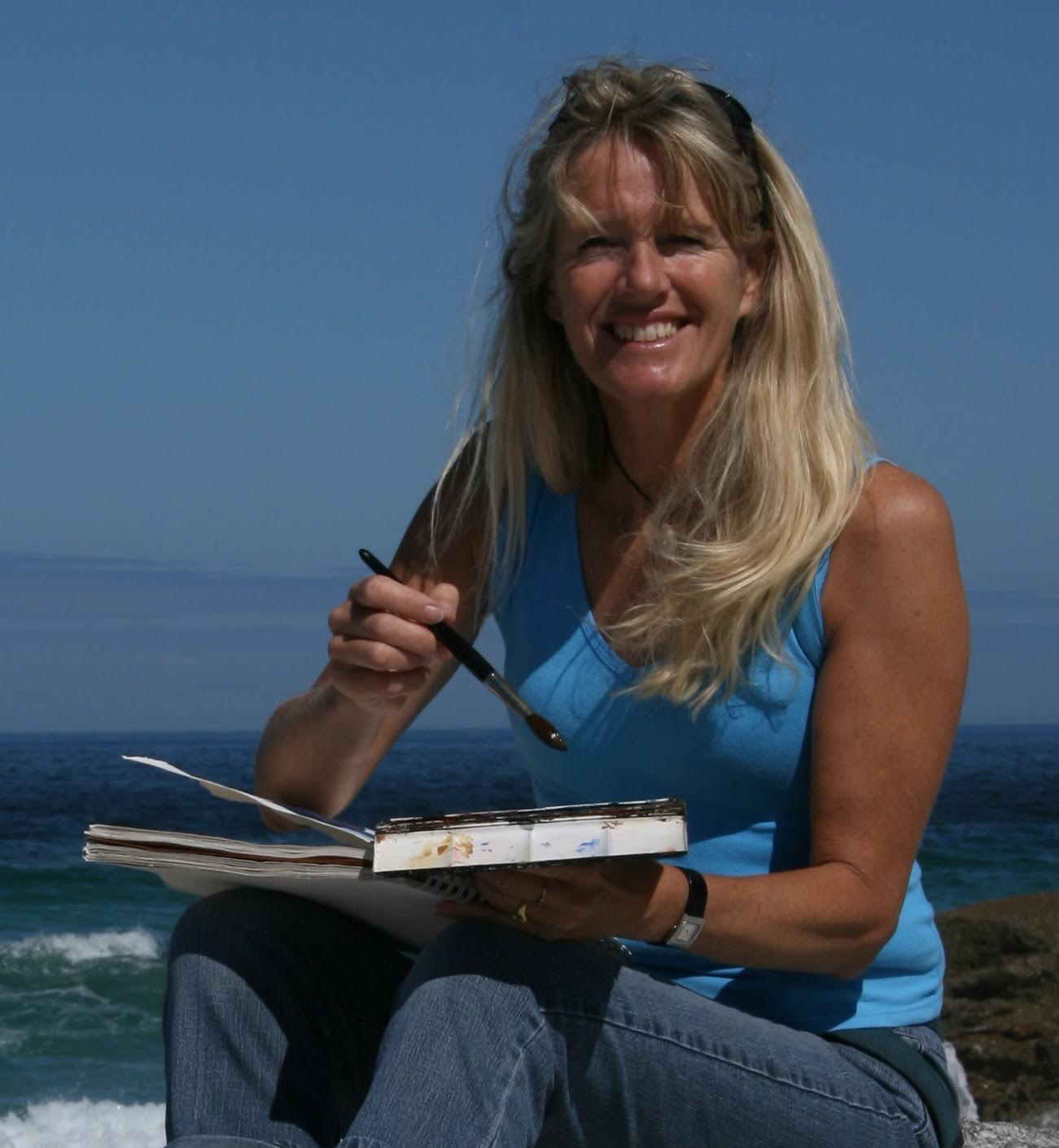
Hazel Soan

Hazel Soan is a British artist working out of studios in London and Cape Town and on location throughout the world.

She paints in watercolour and oil and is known for her direct wet-into-wet watercolour approach and her use of rich pigment and strong contrasts of light and shade. Shape, interval and tone are her predominant subject matter. Figures, African wildlife and action are the main source of reference.

Her work is represented in private and public collections worldwide, including the National Portrait Gallery, the Lister Institute, the Chelsea and Westminster Hospital, the Ritz, other London and International Hotels, the British Embassy in Ankara and the EU Delegation in Windhoek. Hazel has held numerous solo exhibitions, mainly in London and the UK, but also in Venezuela, Namibia and Zimbabwe. She has participated in mixed exhibitions, including Royal Academy, Barbican Centre, Midland Open, Mall Galleries, David Shepherd Wildlife Foundation.

She was an Art Expert on Channel 4’s Watercolour Challenge and had her own series, Anglia TV’s Splash of Colour.

She teaches painting techniques via books, DVD films, workshops, lectures and painting holidays, demonstrating the immediacy of the watercolour medium and the properties of watercolour pigments. She is the author of more than 26 books and contributes articles regularly to The Artist magazine and other art titles.
