= J.League World Challenge =

J.League World Challenge 788
- Organiser(s): J.League
- Founded: 2001
- Region: Japan (AFC)
- Teams: 2 or more
- Current champions: (England) Liverpool (2025)
- Website: Official website
- 2025 J.League World Challenge

The J.League World Challenge is a tournament between J.League clubs and foreign clubs invited to Japan by the J.League.

== Editions ==
=== 2017 ===
17 July 2017
18:10

Urawa Red Diamonds (Japan)	2–3	(Germany) Borussia Dortmund
Koroki 24'; Endo 85'	Report (J.League)	Mor 76', 79'; Schürrle 88'

Saitama Stadium 2002, Saitama
Attendance: 58,327
Referee: Hiroyuki Kimura (Japan)

Urawa Red Diamonds	Borussia Dortmund

22 July 2017
18:00

Kashima Antlers (Japan)	2–0	(Spain) Sevilla
Suzuki 72', 90+1'	Report (J.League)

Kashima Soccer Stadium, Kashima
Attendance: 28,308
Referee: Minoru Tōjō (Japan)

Kashima Antlers	Sevilla

=== 2019 ===
19 July 2019
19:00

Kawasaki Frontale (Japan)	1–0	(England) Chelsea
Damião 86'	Report (Soccerway)

Nissan Stadium, Yokohama
Attendance: 61,012
Referee: Yuichi Nishimura (Japan)

Kawasaki Frontale	Chelsea

=== 2023 ===
23 July 2023
19:00

Yokohama F. Marinos (Japan)	3–5	(England) Manchester City
Anderson Lopes 27'; Matsubara 37'; Inoue 86'	Report (J.League)	Stones 40'; Álvarez 43'; Haaland 52', 90+2'; Rodri 72'

Japan National Stadium, Shinjuku
Attendance: 61,618
Referee: Hiroki Kasahara (Japan)

Yokohama F. Marinos	Manchester City

=== 2024 ===
27 July 2024
19:00

Vissel Kobe (Japan)	2–3	(England) Tottenham Hotspur
Osako 9'; Jean Patric 64'	Report (J.League)	Porro 16'; Son Heung-min 48'; Moore 88'

Japan National Stadium, Shinjuku
Attendance: 54,255
Referee: Futoshi Nakamura (Japan)

Vissel Kobe	Tottenham Hotspur

=== 2025 ===
30 July 2025
19:30

Yokohama F. Marinos (Japan)	1–3	(England) Liverpool
Uenaka 55'	Report (J.League)	Wirtz 62'; Nyoni 68'; Ngumoha 87'

Nissan Stadium, Yokohama
Attendance: 67,032
Referee: Ryo Tanimoto (Japan)

Yokohama F. Marinos	Liverpool

== See also ==
- J.League
- Japan Football Association
