= David Pickering (writer) =

David Pickering is a reference books compiler. He has contributed to (and often been sole author and editor of) some 150 reference books, mostly in the areas of the arts, language, local history and popular interest. These include a Dictionary of Theatre (1988), an Encyclopedia of Pantomime (1993), Brewer's Twentieth-Century Music (1994; 1997), a Dictionary of Superstitions (1995) and a Dictionary of Witchcraft (1996).

He lives in Buckingham with his wife and two sons. Pickering was a pupil at Dryden House, Oundle School. He graduated in English from St Peter's College, Oxford.

== Dictionary of the Theatre (1988) ==
Dictionary of the Theatre, edited by Pickering and published by Sphere in 1988, is intended to be a comprehensive dictionary of important plays and figures in the history of theatre. Derek Paget, writing in New Theatre Quarterly in 1990, wrote that the Dictionary was "likely to be of great use as reference (and as a first line of inquiry) to a wide range of people".

== Bibliography ==
- Pickering, David (2004). The Penguin Dictionary of First Names. Penguin Books. ISBN 0-14-101398-2.
- Pickering, David (2004). The Penguin Thesaurus. Penguin Books. ISBN 0-14-101848-8.
- Pickering, David (2002). Cassell's Dictionary of Superstitions. Cassell Reference. ISBN 0-304-36561-0.
- Pickering, David (2006). Pirates. Collins Gem. ISBN 0-00-723007-9.
- Pickering, David (2007). Ancient Greece. Collins Gem. ISBN 978-0-00-723165-2.
- Pickering, David (2006). Jokes. Penguin Books. ISBN 0-14-102748-7.
- Pickering, David (2002). Cassell's Dictionary of Witchcraft. Cassell Reference. ISBN 0-304-36562-9.
- Pickering, David (2005). The Penguin Pocket Dictionary of Babies' Names. Penguin Books. ISBN 0-14-101976-X.
- Pickering, David (2000). A Dictionary of Folklore. Facts on File Inc. ISBN 0-8160-4250-0.
- Pickering, David (1999). Dictionary of Witchcraft. Caxton. ISBN 1-86019-850-3.
- Pickering, David (2007). Ancient Rome. Collins Gem. ISBN 978-0-00-723164-5.
- Pickering, David (2001). Great Sporting Quotations. Cassell Reference. ISBN 0-304-36315-4.
- Pickering, David (1993). Encyclopaedia of Pantomime. St James Press. ISBN 1-873477-45-7.
- Pickering, David (2001). The Cassell Soccer Companion: History, Facts, Anecdotes. Weidenfeld & Nicolson. ISBN 0-304-34700-0.
- Pickering, David (1994). Brewer's Twentieth-century Music. Weidenfeld & Nicolson. ISBN 0-304-32049-8.
- Pickering, David (1997). Cassell companion to 20th-century music. Cassell. ISBN 0-304-34937-2.
- Pickering, David (1996). Cassell Dictionary of Abbreviations. Weidenfeld & Nicolson. ISBN 0-304-34612-8.
- Pickering, David (1997). Cassell Dictionary of Proverbs. Weidenfeld & Nicolson. ISBN 0-304-34911-9.
  - Review, by Rosenthal, Marilyn, Library Journal. 1/1/2002, Vol. 127 Issue 1, p88-89
  - Review, by Bibel, Barbara and Quinn, Mary Ellen Booklist. 02/01/98, Vol. 94 Issue 11, p934. 2p.
- Pickering, David (2000). Cassell's Sporting Quotations. Cassell Reference. ISBN 0-304-35384-1.
- Pickering, David (1988). Dictionary of the Theatre. Sphere Books. ISBN 0-7474-0019-9.
