= Theresa Cheung (author) =

English writer

- Occupation: Author
- Writing career
- Genre: Spirituality
- Website: theresacheung.com//

Theresa Cheung (born 8 April 1965) is an English author who writes on the subjects of spirituality, dreams, and the paranormal.

She has been twice named among the ‘100 Most Spiritually Influential Living People’ and has been described in the UK media as the “British grande dame of psychic and spiritual studies”.

Cheung has written more than 150 books, mostly on new age topics, and which have been translated into 40 languages. She is best known for The Dream Dictionary from A to Z (HarperElement, 2008).

== Early life ==
Cheung describes herself as having been born into a family of psychics and travelling spiritualists. Her mother, Joy, travelled across the UK as a clairvoyant doing psychic readings and Cheung lived a “bohemian existence” growing up, living in rented accommodation and caravans. Her mother encouraged her to “explore her sixth sense” from a young age and one of her earliest memories is attending a spirit meeting organised by her mother and aunt. By age 14, Cheung had given her first public numerology reading.

Because of her peripatetic lifestyle, Cheung's education suffered and so, aged 16, she began home-schooling herself. She graduated from King's College, Cambridge with a degree in Theology and English, having originally planned to enter the priesthood. Instead, she became an editorial assistant at a publishing house in London before teaching English literature in secondary schools. She was also a health and fitness instructor.

She is of mixed race; her mother is Indonesian and her father British.

== Writing career ==
Cheung's early books, written as ‘Theresa Francis-Cheung’, were health-focussed and included The PCOS Diet Book (Thorsons, 2002) and Pregnancy Weight Management (Adams Media, 2000).

She is best known for her wide range of New Age books covering dream interpretation, the paranormal, and spirituality. These include the Sunday Times bestselling titles An Angel Called My Name (Harper Element, 2008), An Angel Healed Me (Simon & Schuster UK, 2010), and The Dream Dictionary from A to Z (also published under the title The A to Z Dream Dictionary). A companion book, The Dream Cure: How Recalling Your Dreams Can Heal Your Life (HarperCollins/Thorsons), was released in August 2024. Other books include The Element Encyclopedia of Birthdays (Harper Element, 2007) and The Premonition Code (Watkins Publishing, 2018), written with cognitive neuroscientist Dr. Julia Mossbridge.

In 2025, Cheung published The Akashic Records through Octopus, Hachette and Dreaming of Your Future: Unlock the Precognitive Secrets of Your Mind through Llewellyn.. In September 2025, her debut novel, Nightborn, was published. In February 2026, she published Your Twin Flame Journey through Godsfield, Octopus, Hachette. Extreme Dreaming is scheduled for publication by Godsfield Press in October 2026.

Her forthcoming books for 2027 include Invisible Strings, published by Findhorn Press, The Power of Solitude, published by Godsfield Press, It's a Sign, also published by Godsfield Press, and Between Worlds: The Seven Spiritual Lessons of Dementia, published by New World Library.

== Media career ==
Cheung has written for numerous UK-based and international magazines, including Cosmopolitan, Good Housekeeping, Red, Grazia, Heat, Glamour, Vice and Bustle. She is also a media commentator on subjects including dream decoding, spirituality, and astrology, for TV, radio, and national newspapers including Fox 32 Chicago, the Daily Mail, Daily Express, and Sunday Mirror.

She is British daytime programme This Morning's regular dream decoder and hosts spiritual podcast White Shores. Since September 2025, Cheung has hosted a weekly show, The Healing Power of Your Dreams, on UK Health Radio.

In August 2026, Cheung was appointed Festival Programmer for the Mind Body Spirit Festival, joining former Hello! deputy editor Alexandra Wilby as part of the festival's new programming team. The pair are responsible for curating speakers, stages and content across its live events and digital platforms.

Cheung also collaborates with The Institute of Noetic Sciences.

== Personal life ==
Cheung is married and has two children. She currently lives in Windsor with her husband, Ray.
