= Han Willhoft-King =

English footballer (born 2006)

Personal information
- Full name: Gabriel Han Willhoft-King
- Date of birth: 24 January 2006 (age 20)
- Place of birth: London, England
- Height: 1.74 m (5 ft 9 in)
- Position: Midfielder

Youth career
- 2012–2024: Tottenham Hotspur
- 2024–2025: Manchester City

International career
Years	Team	Apps	(Gls)
2021	England U16	2	(0)

Gabriel Han Willhoft-King (born 24 January 2006), commonly known as Han Willhoft-King, is an English former professional footballer who last played as a midfielder for Manchester City.

== Early life ==
Willhoft-King was born in London to a British-Indian father who grew up in Jakarta, Indonesia and Chinese-American mother with parents from Liaoning, China and Taiwan.

== Club career ==
Willhoft-King joined the academy of Tottenham Hotspur at the age of six, progressing through their academy and being named by English newspaper The Guardian as the best player in his age-group at the club in September 2022. He turned down a contract offer from Tottenham and left the club at the end of the 2023–24 season following the conclusion of his scholarship. After leaving Tottenham, he planned to go to University of California but instead joined Manchester City during the summer of 2024.

After a season at Manchester City, Willhoft-King confirmed in a 2025 interview with The Guardian that he had retired from professional football and had matriculated as a law undergraduate at Brasenose College, Oxford.

== International career ==
Due to his ancestry, Willhoft-King is eligible to represent England, China, Germany, the US, Indonesia, and India at international level. He made two appearances for the England under-16 side in 2021, featuring in a 3–2 win over Scotland and a 3–1 win over Turkey.

In July 2023, he was considered for selection to the Indonesia under-17 side by manager Bima Sakti ahead of the 2023 FIFA U-17 World Cup, with Sakti stating that Willhoft-King's parents had been contacted. However, later in the same month, Sakti announced that Willhoft-King's call-up had been cancelled, after his parents confirmed that he did not have an Indonesian passport, and the naturalisation process would take too long.
