= 2022–23 Udinese Calcio season =

Udinese
2022–23 season
- Owner: Giampaolo Pozzo
- Chairman: Franco Soldati
- Manager: Andrea Sottil
- Stadium: Stadio Friuli
- Serie A: 12th
- Coppa Italia: Round of 32
- Top goalscorer: League: Beto (10); All: Beto (10)
Home colours	Away colours	Third colours

The 2022–23 season was the 126th in the history of Udinese Calcio and their 28th consecutive season in the top flight. The club participated in Serie A and the Coppa Italia.

== Players ==
As of 9 March 2023

Note: Flags indicate national team as defined under FIFA eligibility rules; some limited exceptions apply. Players may hold more than one non-FIFA nationality.

No.	Pos.	Nation	Player
1	GK	ITA	Marco Silvestri
2	DF	IRL	Festy Ebosele
3	DF	MAR	Adam Masina
4	MF	SLO	Sandi Lovrić
5	MF	GER	Tolgay Arslan
7	FW	NGR	Isaac Success
8	DF	NED	Marvin Zeegelaar
9	FW	GBS	Beto
10	FW	ESP	Gerard Deulofeu
11	MF	BRA	Walace
13	DF	ITA	Destiny Udogie (on loan from Tottenham Hotspur)
14	DF	IRL	James Abankwah
15	DF	POR	Leonardo Buta
18	DF	ARG	Nehuén Pérez

No.	Pos.	Nation	Player
19	DF	NGR	Kingsley Ehizibue
20	GK	ITA	Daniele Padelli
23	DF	CMR	Enzo Ebosse
24	MF	SRB	Lazar Samardžić
26	MF	FRA	Florian Thauvin
29	DF	SLO	Jaka Bijol
30	FW	MKD	Ilija Nestorovski
37	MF	ARG	Roberto Pereyra (captain)
39	FW	POR	Vivaldo Semedo
50	DF	BRA	Rodrigo Becão (vice-captain)
67	DF	FRA	Axel Guessand
80	FW	ITA	Simone Pafundi
99	GK	ITA	Edoardo Piana

=== Out on loan ===
As of 17 January 2023

Note: Flags indicate national team as defined under FIFA eligibility rules; some limited exceptions apply. Players may hold more than one non-FIFA nationality.

No.	Pos.	Nation	Player
—	DF	CRO	Filip Benković (at Eintracht Braunschweig until 30 June 2023)
—	DF	CIV	Hassane Kamara (at Watford until 30 June 2023)
—	MF	ITA	Marco Ballarini (at Trento until 30 June 2023)
—	MF	NOR	Martin Palumbo (at Juventus Next Gen until 30 June 2023)

No.	Pos.	Nation	Player
—	FW	ESP	Cristo González (at Sporting de Gijón until 30 June 2023)
—	FW	ITA	Simone Ianesi (at Pontedera until 30 June 2023)
—	FW	BRA	Matheus Martins (at Watford until 30 June 2023)

== Transfers ==
=== In ===
Pos.	Player	Transferred from	Fee	Date	Source
DF	(Portugal) Leonardo Buta	(Portugal) Braga B	€2,000,000	1 July 2022	
FW	(Guinea-Bissau) Beto	(Portugal) Portimonense	€15,000,000	1 July 2022	
DF	(Italy) Destiny Udogie	(Italy) Hellas Verona	€5,200,000	1 July 2022	
DF	(Morocco) Adam Masina	(England) Watford	€5,000,000	18 July 2022	
DF	(Argentina) Nehuén Pérez	(Spain) Atlético Madrid	€8,000,000	29 July 2022	
DF	(Italy) Destiny Udogie	(Italy) Hellas Verona	Loan	17 August 2022	
DF	(Ivory Coast) Hassane Kamara	(England) Watford	€19,000,000	22 August 2022	
MF	(Brazil) Matheus Martins	(Brazil) Fluminense	€6,000,000	2 January 2023	
MF	(France) Florian Thauvin	(Mexico) Tigres UANL	Free	31 January 2023	

=== Out ===
Pos.	Player	Transferred to	Fee	Date	Source
DF	(Denmark) Jens Stryger Larsen	(Turkey) Trabzonspor	Free	1 July 2022	
MF	(Senegal) Mamadou Coulibaly	(Italy) Salernitana	€3,000,000	1 July 2022	
DF	(Argentina) Nahuel Molina	(Spain) Atlético Madrid	€20,000,000	28 July 2022	
MF	(Italy) Thomas Battistella	(Italy) Modena	€700,000	28 July 2022	
FW	(Bosnia and Herzegovina) Riad Bajić	(Turkey) Giresunspor	Free	29 July 2022	
DF	(Italy) Destiny Udogie	(England) Tottenham Hotspur	€18,000,000	16 August 2022	
DF	(France) Brandon Soppy	(Italy) Atalanta	€9,900,000	19 August 2022	
DF	(Ivory Coast) Hassane Kamara	(England) Watford	Loan	23 August 2022	
MF	(Brazil) Matheus Martins	(England) Watford	€6,000,000	3 January 2023	
MF	(France) Jean-Victor Makengo	(France) Lorient	€11,000,000	30 January 2023	

== Pre-season and friendlies ==
Win Draw Loss

13 July 2022 Friendly	Rapid Lienz (Austria)	0–11	(Italy) Udinese	Lienz, Austria
18:00 CEST (UTC+2)		Report	Nestorovski 10'; Lovrić 14', 27'; Cocetta 17'; Deulofeu 38'; Pereyra 42'; Arslan 54', 75'; Makengo 64', 81'; Success 90'	Stadium: Dolomitenstadion; Referee: Marco Schlacher (Austria)

16 July 2022 Friendly	Union Berlin (Germany)	3–3	(Italy) Udinese	Lienz, Austria
13:15 CEST (UTC+2)	Khedira 44', (yellow card) 51'; Nuytinck 49' (o.g.); Schäfer (yellow card) 50'; Heintz (yellow card) 54'; Knoche 63'	Report	Nestorovski 25', 43', (yellow card) 74'; Benković 55'; Walace (yellow card) 57'	Stadium: Dolomitenstadion; Referee: Marco Schlacher (Austria)

17 July 2022 Friendly	Schalke 04 (Germany)	Cancelled	(Italy) Udinese	Mittersill, Austria
16:30 CEST (UTC+2)				Stadium: Waldstadion
Note: Udinese's match against Schalke was cancelled and replaced with a match against Ilirija 1911 due to security reasons.

17 July 2022 Friendly	Udinese (Italy)	3–0	(Slovenia) Ilirija 1911	Lienz, Austria
17:00 CEST (UTC+2)	Nestorovski 48', 75', 87'	Report	Stevanović (yellow card) 53'; Kesic (yellow card) 53'	Stadium: Dolomitenstadt; Referee: Marco Schlacher (Austria)

21 July 2022 Friendly	Udinese (Italy)	1–2	(Germany) Bayer Leverkusen	Zell am See, Austria
18:00 CEST (UTC+2)	Silvestri (yellow card) 22'; Nestorovski (yellow card) 47'; Nuytinck (yellow card) 51'; Pereyra 82' (pen.); Soppy (yellow card) 84'	Report	Andrich (yellow card) 47'; Tah (yellow card) 52'; Tapsoba 55'; Paulinho 76'	Stadium: Alois Latini Stadion; Attendance: 600; Referee: Samuel Sampl (Austria)

24 July 2022 Friendly	Udinese (Italy)	1–2	Qatar	Mittersill, Austria
17:00 CEST (UTC+2)	Benković 28'	Report	Ali 24' (pen.); Ahmed 40'	Stadium: Waldstadion; Referee: Hochataffel (Austria)

25 July 2022 Friendly	Udinese (Italy)	2–1	(Cyprus) Pafos	Lienz, Austria
17:00 CEST (UTC+2)	Nestorovski (yellow card) 59'; Samardžić 88'; Success 89'	Report	Jairo 18'; Palacios (yellow card) 59'	Stadium: Dolomitenstadt; Referee: Arno Weichsler (Austria)

29 July 2022 Friendly	Udinese (Italy)	1–3	(England) Chelsea	Udine, Italy
21:00 CEST (UTC+2)	Deulofeu 42'	Report	Kanté 20'; Sterling 37'; Mount 90'	Stadium: Stadio Friuli; Attendance: 11,776; Referee: Michael Fabbri (Italy)

30 July 2022 Friendly	Udinese XI (Italy)	0–2	(England) Chelsea XI	Udine, Italy
12:00 CEST (UTC+2)		Report	Loftus-Cheek 45+1'; Ziyech 56' (pen.)	Stadium: Stadio Friuli; Referee: Giovanni Ayroldi (Italy)

10 December 2022 Friendly	Udinese (Italy)	1–3	(England) West Ham United	Udine, Italy
15:00 CET (UTC+1)	Pereyra 13'	Report	Benrahma 45+1'; Lanzini 70'; Antonio 89'	Stadium: Stadio Friuli; Referee: Daniele Chiffi (Italy)

17 December 2022 Friendly	Udinese (Italy)	0–1	(Spain) Athletic Bilbao	Udine, Italy
20:00 CET (UTC+1)		Report	I. Williams 86'	Stadium: Stadio Friuli; Referee: Giovanni Ayroldi (Italy)

23 December 2022 Friendly	Udinese XI (Italy)	2–0	(Italy) Lecce	Udine
15:30 CET (UTC+1)	Beto 23'; Bijol (yellow card) 35'; Pérez 51'; Ebosele (yellow card) 51'	Report	Pongračić (yellow card) 15'	Stadium: Stadio Friuli; Referee: Daniele Minelli

29 December 2022 Friendly	Cremonese (Italy)	1–3	(Italy) Udinese	Cremona
13:00 CET (UTC+1)	Beto 12' (o.g.)	Report	Arslan 14', 18'; Beto 33'; Ebosse (yellow card) 78'	Stadium: Stadio Giovanni Zini; Referee: Matteo Marcenaro

== Competitions ==
=== Overall record ===
Competition	First match	Last match	Starting round	Final position	Record							
Competition	First match	Last match	Starting round	Final position	Pld	W	D	L	GF	GA	GD	Win %
Serie A	13 August 2022	4 June 2023	Matchday 1	12th	38	11	13	14	47	48	−1	28.95
Coppa Italia	5 August 2022	19 October 2022	Round of 64	Round of 32	2	1	0	1	4	4	+0	50.00
Total					40	12	13	15	51	52	−1	30.00

Source: Soccerway

=== Serie A ===
==== League table ====
Pos	Team	Pld	W	D	L	GF	GA	GD	Pts
10	Torino	38	14	11	13	42	41	+1	53
11	Monza	38	14	10	14	48	52	−4	52
12	Udinese	38	11	13	14	47	48	−1	46
13	Sassuolo	38	12	9	17	47	61	−14	45
14	Empoli	38	10	13	15	37	49	−12	43

Source: Serie A
Rules for classification: 1) Points; 2) Tiebreaker for Champions team and third relegated team; 3) Head-to-head points; 4) Head-to-head goal difference; 5) Goal difference; 6) Goals scored; 7) Draw. (Note: Head-to-head record is used only after all the matches between the teams in question have been played)

==== Results summary ====
Overall								Home						Away					
Pld	W	D	L	GF	GA	GD	Pts	W	D	L	GF	GA	GD	W	D	L	GF	GA	GD
38	11	13	14	47	48	−1	46	6	9	4	30	20	+10	5	4	10	17	28	−11

Source: Serie A

==== Results by round ====
Round	1	2	3	4	5	6	7	8	9	10	11	12	13	14	15	16	17	18	19	20	21	22	23	24	25	26	27	28	29	30	31	32	33	34	35	36	37	38
Ground	A	H	A	H	H	A	H	A	H	A	H	A	H	A	A	H	A	H	A	H	A	H	A	H	A	A	H	A	H	A	H	A	H	H	A	H	A	H
Result	L	D	W	W	W	W	W	W	D	D	L	D	D	D	L	D	L	L	W	D	L	D	L	D	D	W	W	L	D	L	W	L	D	W	L	L	L	L
Position	17	15	11	9	4	4	3	3	4	6	6	8	8	8	8	8	8	8	7	7	8	7	10	9	10	10	8	10	10	12	9	13	12	9	12	12	12	12

Source: Serie A
A = Away; H = Home; W = Win; D = Draw; L = Loss

==== Matches ====
The league fixtures were announced on 24 June 2022.

13 August 2022 1	Milan	4–2	Udinese	Milan
18:30 CEST (UTC+2)	Hernandez 12' (pen.); Rebić 15', 68'; Brahim 46'; Krunić (yellow card) 34'	Report	Becão 2', (yellow card) 34'; Soppy (yellow card) 10'; Masina 45+4'; Pérez (yellow card) 55'; Ebosele (yellow card) 90+2'	Stadium: San Siro; Attendance: 70,197; Referee: Livio Marinelli

20 August 2022 2	Udinese	0–0	Salernitana	Udine
18:30 CEST (UTC+2)	Makengo (yellow card) 29'; Walace (yellow card) 45+1'; Pérez (red card) 45+4'	Report	Bonazzoli (yellow card) 35'; Bradarić (yellow card) 49'; Bronn (yellow card) 66'; Gyömbér (yellow card) 74'	Stadium: Stadio Friuli; Attendance: 17,054; Referee: Gianluca Aureliano

26 August 2022 3	Monza	1–2	Udinese	Monza
18:30 CEST (UTC+2)	Caldirola (yellow card) 24'; Colpani 32'; Machín (yellow card) 82'; Pessina (yellow card) 90+2'	Report	Udogie (yellow card) 23', (goal) 77'; Beto 36'; Nestorovski (yellow card) 82'	Stadium: Stadio Brianteo; Attendance: 9,955; Referee: Marco Di Bello

31 August 2022 4	Udinese	1–0	Fiorentina	Udine
18:30 CEST (UTC+2)	Beto 17'; Udogie (yellow card) 90+2'	Report	Cabral (yellow card) 47'; Igor (yellow card) 89'	Stadium: Stadio Friuli; Attendance: 19,684; Referee: Maurizio Mariani

4 September 2022 5	Udinese	4–0	Roma	Udine
20:45 CEST (UTC+2)	Udogie 5', (yellow card) 62'; Samardžić 56'; Makengo (yellow card) 66'; Pereyra 75', (yellow card) 89'; Lovrić 82'	Report	Dybala (yellow card) 45'; Pellegrini (yellow card) 52'	Stadium: Stadio Friuli; Attendance: 24,108; Referee: Fabio Maresca

11 September 2022 6	Sassuolo	1–3	Udinese	Reggio Emilia
15:00 CEST (UTC+2)	Frattesi 33'; Ruan (red card) 44'; Lopez (yellow card) 72'	Report	Becão (yellow card) 8'; Ebosse (yellow card) 25'; Ehizibue (yellow card) 63'; Beto 75', 90+3'; Samardžić 90+1'	Stadium: Mapei Stadium; Attendance: 8,694; Referee: Giacomo Camplone

18 September 2022 7	Udinese	3–1	Internazionale	Udine
12:30 CEST (UTC+2)	Škriniar 22' (o.g.); Pereyra (yellow card) 40'; Udogie (yellow card) 51'; Becão (yellow card) 56'; Bijol 85'; Arslan 90+3'	Report	Barella 5'; Bastoni (yellow card) 13'; Mkhitaryan (yellow card) 21'; Darmian (yellow card) 45+1'; Brozović (yellow card) 57'	Stadium: Stadio Friuli; Attendance: 22,475; Referee: Paolo Valeri

3 October 2022 8	Hellas Verona	1–2	Udinese	Verona
20:45 CEST (UTC+2)	Doig 23'; Veloso (yellow card) 31'; Henry (yellow card) 77'; Depaoli (yellow card) 84'	Report	Pérez (yellow card) 47'; Beto 70'; Becão (yellow card) 74'; Pereyra (yellow card) 86'; Bijol 90+3'	Stadium: Stadio Marcantonio Bentegodi; Attendance: 15,352; Referee: Daniele Minelli

9 October 2022 9	Udinese	2–2	Atalanta	Udine
15:00 CEST (UTC+2)	Bijol (yellow card) 8'; Deulofeu 67'; Ebosse (yellow card) 70'; Pérez 78'	Report	Lookman 36', (yellow card) 37'; Muriel 56' (pen.); Hateboer (yellow card) 90+1'	Stadium: Stadio Friuli; Attendance: 24,671; Referee: Daniele Doveri

16 October 2022 10	Lazio	0–0	Udinese	Rome
15:00 CEST (UTC+2)	Milinković-Savić (yellow card) 74'	Report	Becão (yellow card) 7'; Pérez (yellow card) 53'; Lovrić (yellow card) 79'; Ehizibue (yellow card) 90+3'	Stadium: Stadio Olimpico; Attendance: 45,000; Referee: Andrea Colombo

23 October 2022 11	Udinese	1–2	Torino	Udine
12:30 CEST (UTC+2)	Deulofeu 26'; Success (yellow card) 32'; Bijol (yellow card) 85'	Report	Aina 14', (yellow card) 68'; Lazaro (yellow card) 34'; Pellegri 69'; Milinković-Savić (yellow card) 71'; Linetty (yellow card) 86'	Stadium: Stadio Friuli; Attendance: 20,711; Referee: Matteo Marchetti

30 October 2022 12	Cremonese	0–0	Udinese	Cremona
15:00 CET (UTC+1)	Meïté (yellow card) 4'	Report		Stadium: Stadio Giovanni Zini; Attendance: 12,810; Referee: Massimiliano Irrati

4 November 2022 13	Udinese	1–1	Lecce	Udine
20:45 CET (UTC+1)	Deulofeu (yellow card) 37'; Bijol (yellow card) 45+1'; Beto 68'	Report	Colombo 33'; Umtiti (yellow card) 55'; Gendrey (yellow card) 69'; Oudin (yellow card) 87'	Stadium: Stadio Friuli; Attendance: 21,834; Referee: Francesco Fourneau

8 November 2022 14	Spezia	1–1	Udinese	La Spezia
18:30 CET (UTC+1)	Reca 33'; Bourabia (yellow card) 36'; Kiwior (yellow card) 45'; Bastoni (yellow card) 84'	Report	Arslan (yellow card) 17'; Lovrić 43'; Success (yellow card) 72'; Nuytinck (yellow card) 73'	Stadium: Stadio Alberto Picco; Attendance: 6,900; Referee: Marco Piccinini

12 November 2022 15	Napoli	3–2	Udinese	Naples
15:00 CET (UTC+1)	Osimhen 15'; Juan Jesus (yellow card) 25'; Zieliński 31'; Elmas 58'; Mário Rui (yellow card) 78'	Report	Walace (yellow card) 27'; Pereyra (yellow card) 37'; Nestorovski 79'; Samardžić 82'; Ebosse (yellow card) 84'	Stadium: Stadio Diego Armando Maradona; Attendance: 51,000; Referee: Giovanni Ayroldi

4 January 2023 16	Udinese	1–1	Empoli	Udine
20:45 CET (UTC+1)	Walace (yellow card) 45+2'; Pereyra 70'; Nestorovski (yellow card) 90+4'	Report	Baldanzi 3'; Akpa Akpro (yellow card) 18' (yellow-red card) 79'; Caputo (yellow card) 61'	Stadium: Stadio Friuli; Attendance: 19,327; Referee: Marco Serra

7 January 2023 17	Juventus	1–0	Udinese	Turin
18:00 CET (UTC+1)	Locatelli (yellow card) 36'; Danilo 86'	Report	Success (yellow card) 54'; Bijol (yellow card) 67'	Stadium: Juventus Stadium; Attendance: 39,536; Referee: Matteo Marchetti

15 January 2023 18	Udinese	1–2	Bologna	Udine
15:00 CET (UTC+1)	Beto 10'; Walace (yellow card) 57'	Report	Lucumí (yellow card) 41'; Sansone 59'; Soriano (yellow card) 75'; Posch 80'; Ferguson (yellow card) 90+1'	Stadium: Stadio Friuli; Attendance: 20,486; Referee: Manuel Volpi

22 January 2023 19	Sampdoria	0–1	Udinese	Genoa
12:30 CET (UTC+1)	Leris (yellow card) 38'; Nuytinck (yellow card) 71'; Gabbiadini (yellow card) 90+2'	Report	Ehizibue (yellow card) 32', (goal) 88'	Stadium: Stadio Luigi Ferraris; Attendance: 18,642; Referee: Maurizio Mariani

30 January 2023 20	Udinese	1–1	Hellas Verona	Udine
20:45 CET (UTC+1)	Samardžić 21'; Beto (yellow card) 30'	Report	Becão 4' (o.g.); Magnani (yellow card) 17'; Ceccherini (yellow card) 42'; Sulemana (yellow card) 50'	Stadium: Stadio Friuli; Attendance: 17,276; Referee: Luca Pairetto

5 February 2023 21	Torino	1–0	Udinese	Turin
15:00 CET (UTC+1)	Karamoh 49'; Aina (yellow card) 86'	Report	Lovrić (yellow card) 82'	Stadium: Stadio Olimpico Grande Torino; Attendance: 16,820; Referee: Alessandro Prontera

12 February 2023 22	Udinese	2–2	Sassuolo	Udine
12:30 CET (UTC+1)	Udogie 1'; Bijol 28'; Ehizibue (yellow card) 55'; Pérez (yellow card) 81'	Report	Matheus Henrique 6'; Laurienté (yellow card) 31'; Pérez 45+2' (o.g.); Zortea (yellow card) 56'	Stadium: Stadio Friuli; Attendance: 20,912; Referee: Ivano Pezzuto

18 February 2023 23	Internazionale	3–1	Udinese	Milan
20:45 CET (UTC+1)	Lukaku 20' (pen.), (yellow card) 22'; Darmian (yellow card) 39'; Mkhitaryan 73'; Martínez 89'	Report	Masina (yellow card) 22'; Lovrić 43'; Bijol (yellow card) 47'	Stadium: San Siro; Attendance: 71,248; Referee: Federico Dionisi

26 February 2023 24	Udinese	2–2	Spezia	Udine
18:00 CET (UTC+1)	Beto 22'; Pereyra 55'; Ehizibue (yellow card) 58'; Becão (yellow card) 62'	Report	Nzola 6', 72'; Nikolaou (yellow card) 75'; Shomurodov (yellow card) 90+4'	Stadium: Stadio Friuli; Attendance: 20,710; Referee: Matteo Marchetti

4 March 2023 25	Atalanta	0–0	Udinese	Bergamo
18:00 CET (UTC+1)	Éderson (yellow card) 44'; Djimsiti (yellow card) 45+2'	Report	Lovrić (yellow card) 35'; Becão (yellow card) 42'; Ebosele (yellow card) 77'	Stadium: Gewiss Stadium; Attendance: 18,475; Referee: Davide Ghersini

11 March 2023 26	Empoli	0–1	Udinese	Empoli
15:00 CET (UTC+1)	Luperto (yellow card) 28'; Fazzini (yellow card) 74'	Report	Bijol (yellow card) 19'; Becão (yellow card) 45+3', (goal) 54'; Beto (yellow card) 67'; Lovrić (yellow card) 73'	Stadium: Stadio Carlo Castellani; Attendance: 7,465; Referee: Francesco Cosso

18 March 2023 27	Udinese	3–1	Milan	Udine
20:45 CET (UTC+1)	Pereyra 9'; Pérez (yellow card) 27'; Beto 45+1'; Walace (yellow card) 69'; Ehizibue 70'; Ebosele (yellow card) 90'; Becão (yellow card) 90+3'	Report	Ibrahimović 45+4' (pen.); Kalulu (yellow card) 61'; Tonali (yellow card) 90+2'	Stadium: Stadio Friuli; Attendance: 24,992; Referee: Daniele Doveri

2 April 2023 28	Bologna	3–0	Udinese	Bologna
12:30 CET (UTC+1)	Posch 3'; Moro 12'; Lucumí (yellow card) 45+1'; Barrow 49'	Report	Bijol (yellow card) 9'	Stadium: Stadio Renato Dall'Ara; Attendance: 25,562; Referee: Maria Sole Ferrieri Caputi

8 April 2023 29	Udinese	2–2	Monza	Udine
12:30 CEST (UTC+2)	Lovrić 18'; Pérez (yellow card) 76'; Beto 90+2' (pen.)	Report	Izzo (yellow card) 26'; Colpani 48'; Antov (yellow card) 55'; Rovella 56'; Petagna (yellow card) 90+9'	Stadium: Stadio Friuli; Attendance: 22,658; Referee: Luca Massimi

16 April 2023 30	Roma	3–0	Udinese	Rome
20:45 CEST (UTC+2)	Cristante (penalty missed) 37'; Bove 37'; Pellegrini 55'; Mancini (yellow card) 67'; Abraham 90+1'	Report	Pereyra (yellow card) 35', (penalty missed) 69'; Success (yellow card) 40'; Ehizibue (yellow card) 45+4'; Thauvin (yellow card) 90'	Stadium: Stadio Olimpico; Attendance: 61,015; Referee: Antonio Giua

23 April 2023 31	Udinese	3–0	Cremonese	Udinese
15:00 CEST (UTC+2)	Samardžić 2', (yellow card) 47'; Pérez 27'; Success 36'; Arslan (yellow card) 78'	Report	Sernicola (yellow card) 26'; Afena-Gyan (yellow card) 64'; Valeri (yellow card) 87'	Stadium: Stadio Friuli; Attendance: 23,445; Referee: Francesco Fourneau

28 April 2023 32	Lecce	1–0	Udinese	Lecce
18:30 CEST (UTC+2)	Blin (yellow card) 35'; Strefezza (yellow card) 51', (goal) 62' (pen.); Gonzàlez (yellow card) 85'; Ceesay (yellow card) 90+1'	Report	Bijol (yellow card) 7'; Pérez (yellow card) 63'	Stadium: Stadio Via del mare Attendance: 23,069; Referee: Matteo Marchetti

4 May 2023 33	Udinese	1–1	Napoli	Udine
20:45 CEST (UTC+2)	Lovrić 13'; Ehizibue (yellow card) 17'	Report	Osimhen 52'	Stadium: Stadio Friuli; Attendance: 24,911; Referee: Rosario Abisso

8 May 2023 34	Udinese	2–0	Sampdoria	Udine
18:30 CEST (UTC+2)	Pereyra 9'; Masina 34', (yellow card) 90+3'; Becão (yellow card) 57'	Report	Winks (yellow card) 28'; Augello (yellow card) 61'	Stadium: Stadio Friuli; Attendance: 20,430; Referee: Niccolò Baroni

14 May 2023 35	Fiorentina	2–0	Udinese	Florence
15:00 CEST (UTC+2)	Castrovilli 7'; Biraghi (yellow card) 45+4'; Milenković (yellow card) 69'; Venuti (yellow card) 73'; Bonaventura 90'	Report	Ebosele (yellow card) 42'; Walace (yellow card) 45+1'; Zeegelaar (yellow card) 58'	Stadium: Stadio Artemio Franchi; Attendance: 27,383; Referee: Daniele Paterna

21 May 2023 36	Udinese	0–1	Lazio	Udine
20:45 CEST (UTC+2)	Udogie (yellow card) 39'; Pereyra (yellow card) 71'; Bijol (yellow card) 90+1'	Report	Felipe Anderson (yellow card) 22'; Immobile 61' (pen.)	Stadium: Stadio Friuli; Attendance: 21,834; Referee: Luca Pairetto

27 May 2023 37	Salernitana	3–2	Udinese	Salerno
15:00 CEST (UTC+2)	Vilhena (yellow card) 37'; Kastanos 43', (yellow card) 90+1'; Candreva 57'; Troost-Ekong 90+6', (yellow card) 90+8'	Report	Zeegelaar (yellow card) 4' (yellow-red card) 87', (goal) 25'; Nestorovski 30'; Bijol (yellow card) 71'	Stadium: Stadio Arechi; Attendance: 27,035; Referee: Niccolò Barono

4 June 2023 38	Udinese	0–1	Juventus	Udine
21:00 CEST (UTC+2)	Arselan (yellow card) 89'; Nestorovski (yellow card) 89'	Report	Gatti (yellow card) 39'; Chiesa 68'; Paredes (yellow card) 88'	Stadium: Stadio Friuli; Attendance: 23,266; Referee: Marco Guida

=== Coppa Italia ===
5 August 2022 Round of 64	Udinese	2–1	Feralpisalò	Udine
18:00 CEST (UTC+2)	Deulofeu 12' (pen.); Success 64'; Pérez (yellow card) 71'	Report	Siligardi 67'; Verzeletti (yellow card) 90+1'	Stadium: Stadio Friuli; Attendance: 2,962; Referee: Francesco Cosso

19 October 2022 Round of 32	Udinese	2–3	Monza	Udine
21:00 CEST (UTC+2)	Pérez 49', 68', (yellow card) 78'; Deulofeu (yellow card) 90+3'	Report	Birindelli (yellow card) 26'; Valoti 45'; Molina 70'; Petagna 72'; Bondo (yellow card) 90+3'	Stadium: Stadio Friuli; Attendance: 5,034; Referee: Federico Dionisi

== Statistics ==
=== Appearances and goals ===
No.	Pos	Nat	Player	Total		Serie A		Coppa Italia	
No.	Pos	Nat	Player	Apps	Goals	Apps	Goals	Apps	Goals
Goalkeepers
1	GK	(Italy) ITA	Marco Silvestri	9	0	8	0	1	0
20	GK	(Italy) ITA	Daniele Padelli	0	0	0	0	0	0
20	GK	(Italy) ITA	Edoardo Piana	0	0	0	0	0	0
Defenders
2	DF	(Republic of Ireland) IRL	Festy Ebosele	1	0	0+1	0	0	0
3	DF	(Morocco) MAR	Adam Masina	5	1	4	1	1	0
13	DF	(Italy) ITA	Destiny Udogie	7	2	7	2	0	0
14	DF	(Republic of Ireland) IRL	James Abankwah	0	0	0	0	0	0
15	DF	(Portugal) POR	Leonardo Buta	0	0	0	0	0	0
17	DF	(Netherlands) NED	Bram Nuytinck	5	0	2+2	0	0+1	0
18	DF	(Argentina) ARG	Nehuén Pérez	7	0	6	0	1	0
19	DF	(Nigeria) NGR	Kingsley Ehizibue	4	0	0+4	0	0	0
23	DF	(Cameroon) CMR	Enzo Ebosse	7	0	1+5	0	1	0
29	DF	(Slovenia) SLO	Jaka Bijol	6	2	5	2	1	0
50	DF	(Brazil) BRA	Rodrigo Becão	8	1	8	1	0	0
67	DF	(France) FRA	Axel Guessand	0	0	0	0	0	0
72	DF	(Italy) ITA	Nicolò Cocetta	0	0	0	0	0	0
Midfielders
4	MF	(Slovenia) SLO	Sandi Lovrić	9	1	5+3	1	1	0
5	MF	(Germany) GER	Tolgay Arslan	7	1	2+5	1	0	0
6	MF	(France) FRA	Jean-Victor Makengo	9	0	6+2	0	1	0
8	MF	(Bosnia and Herzegovina) BIH	Mato Jajalo	0	0	0	0	0	0
11	MF	(Brazil) BRA	Walace	8	0	8	0	0	0
24	MF	(Germany) GER	Lazar Samardzic	8	2	1+6	2	0+1	0
37	MF	(Argentina) ARG	Roberto Pereyra	9	1	8	1	1	0
77	MF	(Italy) ITA	Leo Miserini	0	0	0	0	0	0
80	MF	(Italy) ITA	Simone Pafundi	0	0	0	0	0	0
Forwards
7	FW	(Nigeria) NGR	Isaac Success	9	1	5+3	0	1	1
9	FW	(Guinea-Bissau) GBS	Beto	8	5	3+5	5	0	0
10	FW	(Spain) ESP	Gerard Deulofeu	9	1	8	0	1	1
30	FW	(North Macedonia) MKD	Ilija Nestorovski	4	0	0+3	0	0+1	0
38	FW	(Portugal) POR	Vivaldo	0	0	0	0	0	0
Players transferred out during the season
93	DF	(France) FRA	Brandon Soppy	2	0	1	0	1	0

Last updated: 3 October 2022
Source: Competitions
