= 2023–24 Tottenham Hotspur F.C. season =

English football club season

Tottenham Hotspur
2023–24 season
- Owner: ENIC International Ltd.
- Chairman: Daniel Levy
- Head coach: Ange Postecoglou
- Stadium: Tottenham Hotspur Stadium
- Premier League: 5th
- FA Cup: Fourth round
- EFL Cup: Second round
- Top goalscorer: League: Son Heung-min (17); All: Son Heung-min (17)
- Highest home attendance: 62,001 v Liverpool; 30 September 2023, Premier League
- Lowest home attendance: 60,872 v Manchester City; 26 January 2024, FA Cup
- Average home league attendance: 61,459
- Biggest win: 4–0 v Aston Villa; 10 March 2024, Premier League
- Biggest defeat: 0–4 v Newcastle United; 13 April 2024, Premier League
Home colours	Away colours	Third colours

The 2023–24 season was Tottenham Hotspur's 32nd consecutive season in the Premier League, 46th consecutive season in the top flight of the English football league system, and 142nd season in existence. In addition to the domestic league, they participated in that season's editions of the FA Cup and EFL Cup.

For the first time since the 2009–10 season, Tottenham did not compete in any European competition, due to an eighth-place finish in the 2022–23 Premier League. It was also the first season since 2008–09 not to feature the club's all-time leading goalscorer Harry Kane, who departed to join German champions Bayern Munich, bidding farewell to Spurs after fourteen years at the club.

On 6 June 2023, Tottenham announced that Ange Postecoglou would become the new head coach on a four-year contract.

On 12 August, South Korea's Son Heung-min was named the club's new captain, having been appointed in place of Hugo Lloris.

== Season overview ==
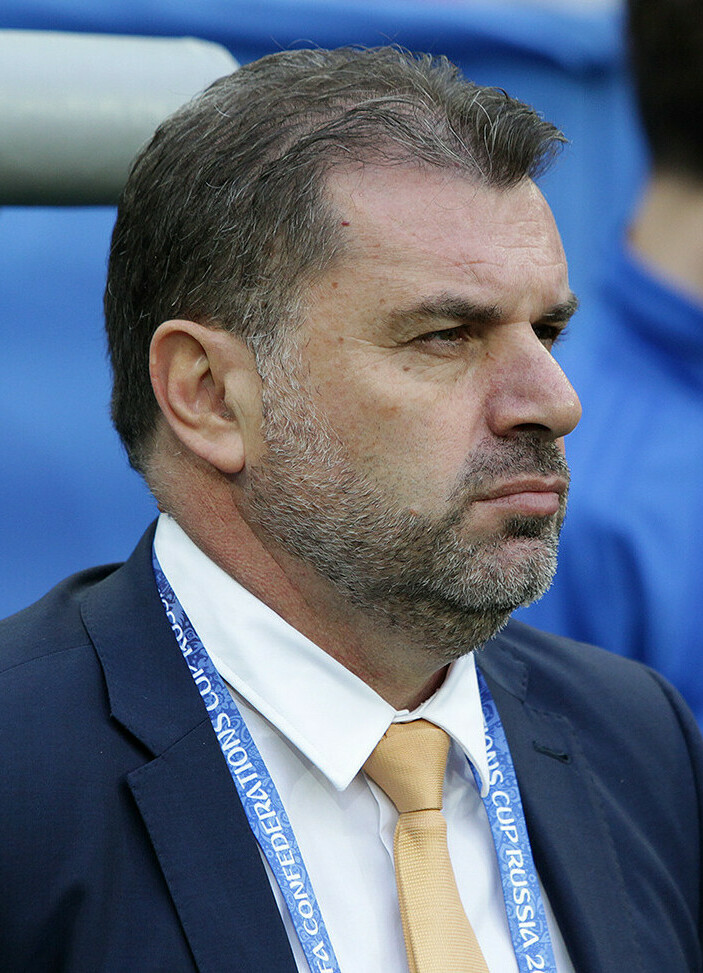
Newly-appointed Tottenham head coach Ange Postecoglou became the first Australian to manage in the Premier League.

The start of the season saw the arrival of Australian manager Ange Postecoglou and the exit of several long-serving players, including Harry Kane, who had been a constant presence for Tottenham. Other players who exited the club included Lucas Moura, who had seen out his contract and Harry Winks, who had been at the club since 2014. Davinson Sánchez, who had had a difficult time at Spurs, was sold to Turkish club Galatasaray. Dejan Kulusevski and Pedro Porro who had arrived on loan in the previous season signed permanent papers at the start of the 2023–24 season.

Tottenham started the season away to Brentford, where the game finished in a 2–2 draw. The following week saw a home game against Manchester United, which Spurs won 2–0. The unbeaten start to the season continued with an away win at Bournemouth; however, in the League Cup Tottenham were drawn against Fulham. This was another away day that ended in a 1–1 draw at full time and needed penalties to decide the tie. Son Heung-min and Kulusevski converted their penalties, however Davinson Sánchez's penalty was saved by Marek Rodák. Fulham scored all five of theirs to knock Tottenham out of the competition. This also was Davinson Sánchez's final game for the club, as a little over a week later he was sold to Galatasaray.

In the league Tottenham were unbeaten in their first ten games and sitting in first place right up to the beginning of November. On 6 November, Spurs played at home against Chelsea: Tottenham started the game well with a goal from Dejan Kulusevski in the sixth minute. Eight minutes later, Son had a goal controversially disallowed for a negligible offside. However, in the 33rd minute Cristian Romero was sent off for a foul despite clearly winning the ball, something which many other players were not sent off for later in the season. This allowed Chelsea to get back into the game at 1–1. In first-half injury time Reece James escaped a red card for an elbow to the face of Destiny Udogie, which would have leveled the teams at 10 players each. The game stayed even for a period of time, until Tottenham lost Udogie to a second yellow in the 55th minute. Their two-player advantage allowed Chelsea to overcome Tottenham, resulting in Nicolas Jackson claiming a second-half hat trick, with the final result a 4–1 loss for Spurs.

== Season squad ==
As of 18 January 2024

Squad no.	Player	Nationality	Position(s)	Date of birth (age)
Goalkeepers
13	Guglielmo Vicario	(Italy)	GK	7 October 1996 (aged 27)
20	Fraser Forster	(England)	GK	17 March 1988 (aged 36)
40	Brandon Austin	(United States)	GK	7 January 1999 (aged 25)
41	Alfie Whiteman	(England)	GK	2 October 1998 (aged 25)
Defenders
6	Radu Drăgușin	(Romania)	CB	3 February 2002 (aged 22)
12	Emerson Royal	(Brazil)	RWB / RB	14 January 1999 (aged 25)
17	Cristian Romero (VC)	(Argentina)	CB	27 April 1998 (aged 26)
19	Ryan Sessegnon	(England)	LWB / LB	18 May 2000 (aged 24)
23	Pedro Porro	(Spain)	RWB / RB	13 September 1999 (aged 24)
33	Ben Davies	(Wales)	CB / LWB	24 April 1993 (aged 31)
37	Micky van de Ven	(Netherlands)	CB	19 April 2001 (aged 23)
38	Destiny Udogie	(Italy)	LB	28 November 2002 (aged 21)
65	Alfie Dorrington	(England)	CB	20 April 2005 (aged 19)
Midfielders
4	Oliver Skipp	(England)	DM / CM	16 September 2000 (aged 23)
5	Pierre-Emile Højbjerg	(Denmark)	DM / CM	5 August 1995 (aged 28)
8	Yves Bissouma	(Mali)	DM / CM	30 August 1996 (aged 27)
10	James Maddison (VC)	(England)	AM / RW	23 November 1996 (aged 27)
18	Giovani Lo Celso	(Argentina)	CM / AM	9 April 1996 (aged 28)
29	Pape Matar Sarr	(Senegal)	CM	14 September 2002 (aged 21)
30	Rodrigo Bentancur	(Uruguay)	DM / CM	25 June 1997 (aged 27)
Forwards
7	Son Heung-min (C)	(South Korea)	LW / ST	8 July 1992 (aged 31)
9	Richarlison	(Brazil)	ST / LW / RW	10 April 1997 (aged 27)
11	Bryan Gil	(Spain)	LW / RW / AM	11 February 2001 (aged 23)
16	Timo Werner	(Germany)	ST	6 March 1996 (aged 28)
21	Dejan Kulusevski	(Sweden)	RW / AM	25 April 2000 (aged 24)
22	Brennan Johnson	(Wales)	RW	23 May 2001 (aged 23)
27	Manor Solomon	(Israel)	LW / RW / AM	24 July 1999 (aged 24)
44	Dane Scarlett	(England)	ST	24 March 2004 (aged 20)
58	Yago Santiago	(Spain)	LW / AM / RW	15 April 2003 (aged 21)
63	Jamie Donley	(England)	SS / ST / AM	3 January 2005 (aged 19)
Out on loan
3	Sergio Reguilón	(Spain)	LWB / LB	16 December 1996 (aged 27)
14	Ivan Perišić	(Croatia)	LW / LWB / LB	2 February 1989 (aged 35)
15	Eric Dier	(England)	CB	15 January 1994 (aged 30)
22	Joe Rodon	(Wales)	CB	22 October 1997 (aged 26)
24	Djed Spence	(England)	RWB / RB	9 August 2000 (aged 23)
25	Japhet Tanganga	(England)	RB / CB	31 March 1999 (aged 25)
28	Tanguy Ndombele	(France)	CM	28 December 1996 (aged 27)
35	Ashley Phillips	(England)	CB	26 June 2005 (aged 19)
36	Alejo Véliz	(Argentina)	ST	19 September 2003 (aged 20)

Last updated: 8 January 2024.
Source: Tottenham Hotspur, Premier League

== Transfers and contracts ==
=== Released ===
Date from	Position	Nationality	Player	To	Notes	Ref.
30 June 2023	LW	(Republic of Ireland)	Tom Bloxham	(England) Blackburn Rovers	End of contract	
30 June 2023	RB	(Sierra Leone)	Kallum Cesay	(England) Wealdstone	End of contract	
30 June 2023	CB	(England)	Malachi Fagan-Walcott	(Wales) Cardiff City	End of contract	
30 June 2023	RW	(England)	Roshaun Mathurin	(England) Crystal Palace	End of contract	
30 June 2023	RW	(England)	Romaine Mundle	(Belgium) Standard Liège	End of contract	
30 June 2023	LM	(England)	Riley Owen	(England) Brentford	End of contract	
30 June 2023	DM	(Republic of Ireland)	Jamie Bowden	Free agent	End of contract	
30 June 2023	RB	(England)	Brandon Bryan-Waugh	Free agent	End of contract	
30 June 2023	CB	(England)	Marqes Muir	Free agent	End of contract	
1 July 2023	FW	(Brazil)	Lucas Moura	(Brazil) São Paulo	End of contract	

- Note: Players will join other clubs after being released or terminated from their contract. Only the following clubs are mentioned when that club signed the player in the same transfer window.

=== Transfers in ===
Date from	Position	Nationality	Player	From	Fee	Ref.
17 June 2023	RW	(Sweden)	Dejan Kulusevski	(Italy) Juventus	Undisclosed	
27 June 2023	GK	(Italy)	Guglielmo Vicario	(Italy) Empoli	Undisclosed	
28 June 2023	AM	(England)	James Maddison	(England) Leicester City	Undisclosed	
1 July 2023	RWB	(Spain)	Pedro Porro	(Portugal) Sporting CP	£40,000,000	
11 July 2023	LW	(Israel)	Manor Solomon	(Ukraine) Shakhtar Donetsk	Free transfer	
5 August 2023	CB	(England)	Ashley Phillips	(England) Blackburn Rovers	Undisclosed	
8 August 2023	CB	(Netherlands)	Micky van de Ven	(Germany) VfL Wolfsburg	Undisclosed	
8 August 2023	CF	(Argentina)	Alejo Véliz	(Argentina) Rosario Central	Undisclosed	
1 September 2023	RW	(Wales)	Brennan Johnson	(England) Nottingham Forest	Undisclosed	
11 January 2024	CB	(Romania)	Radu Drăgușin	(Italy) Genoa	£26,700,000	

- Note: Dejan Kulusevski and Pedro Porro were loaned the previous season and signed permanent deals for the 2023–24 season.

=== Transfers out ===
Date from	Position	Nationality	Player	To	Fee	Ref.
1 July 2023	MF	(England)	Harry Winks	(England) Leicester City	Undisclosed	
12 August 2023	ST	(England)	Harry Kane	(Germany) Bayern Munich	Undisclosed	
2 September 2023	MF	(England)	Harvey White	(England) Stevenage	Undisclosed	
4 September 2023	CB	(Colombia)	Davinson Sánchez	(Turkey) Galatasaray	Undisclosed	
6 September 2023	CB	(Estonia)	Maksim Paskotši	(Switzerland) Grasshoppers	Undisclosed	
1 January 2024	GK	(France)	Hugo Lloris	(United States) Los Angeles FC	Free	
14 February 2024	CB	(England)	Brooklyn Lyons-Foster	(Finland) HJK Helsinki	Undisclosed	

=== Loans in ===
Date from	Position	Nationality	Player	From	Date until	Ref.
9 January 2024	FW	(Germany)	Timo Werner	(Germany) RB Leipzig	End of season	

=== Loans out ===
Date from	Position	Nationality	Player	To	Date until	Ref.
10 August 2023	CB	(Wales)	Joe Rodon	(England) Leeds United	End of season	
24 August 2023	CF	(Republic of Ireland)	Troy Parrott	(Netherlands) Excelsior	End of season	
25 August 2023	CM	(England)	Alfie Devine	(England) Port Vale	17 January 2024 (Note: On 17 January, Devine was recalled from his season-long loan at Port Vale. He was subsequently loaned to Plymouth.)	
30 August 2023	RB	(England)	Djed Spence	(England) Leeds United	4 January 2024 (Note: On 4 January, Spence was recalled from his season-long loan at Leeds. He was subsequently loaned to Genoa.)	
31 August 2023	CF	(England)	Dane Scarlett	(England) Ipswich Town	27 December 2023 (Note: On 27 December, Scarlett was recalled from his season-long loan at Ipswich.)	
1 September 2023	CB	(England)	Japhet Tanganga	(Germany) FC Augsburg	18 January 2024 (Note: On 18 January, Tanganga was recalled from his season-long loan at Augsburg. He was subsequently loaned to Millwall.)	
1 September 2023	LB	(Spain)	Sergio Reguilón	(England) Manchester United	2 January 2024 (Note: On 2 January, Reguilón was recalled from his season-long loan at Manchester United. He was subsequently loaned to Brentford.)	
4 September 2023	CM	(France)	Tanguy Ndombele	(Turkey) Galatasaray	End of season	
4 January 2024	GK	(Republic of Ireland)	Josh Keeley	(England) Barnet	End of season	
8 January 2024	DF	(England)	Ashley Phillips	(England) Plymouth Argyle	End of season	
9 January 2024	MF	(Scotland)	Matthew Craig	(England) Doncaster Rovers	End of season	
11 January 2024	DF	(England)	Eric Dier	(Germany) Bayern Munich	End of season	
11 January 2024	DF	(England)	Djed Spence	(Italy) Genoa	End of season	
17 January 2024	CM	(England)	Alfie Devine	(England) Plymouth Argyle	End of season	
17 January 2024	LB	(Spain)	Sergio Reguilón	(England) Brentford	End of season	
18 January 2024	CB	(England)	Japhet Tanganga	(England) Millwall	End of season	
18 January 2024	LW	(Croatia)	Ivan Perišić	(Croatia) Hajduk Split	End of season	
1 February 2024	ST	(Argentina)	Alejo Véliz	(Spain) Sevilla	End of season	

== Pre-season and friendlies ==
To prepare for the upcoming season, Tottenham played a series of friendlies around Asia and Australia for the Asia-Pacific Tour. This saw newly appointed head coach Ange Postecoglou return to his home country. The club first met fellow English side West Ham United in Australia on 18 July 2023. They then travelled to Thailand to play Leicester City on 23 July 2023, which was cancelled due to adverse weather conditions. To conclude the tour, Tottenham were supposed to visit Singapore to play Italian club Roma on 26 July 2023. However, the match was cancelled due to logistical reasons, and so Tottenham played local club Lion City Sailors instead. On 28 June, Tottenham revealed a special match dedicated to the people of Ukraine, against Shakhtar Donetsk. On 19 March 2024, it was announced that Tottenham would travel to Australia and participate in a post-season friendly against Newcastle, at the Melbourne Cricket Ground, on May 22.

18 July 2023 Asia-Pacific Tour	Tottenham Hotspur	2–3	West Ham United	Perth, Australia
18:00 AWST	Emerson (yellow card) 60'; Lo Celso 68'; Udogie 71'	Report	Ings 17'; Mubama 23'; Scamacca 78'	Stadium: Optus Stadium; Attendance: 46,266; Referee: Kurt Ams (Australia)

26 July 2023 Asia-Pacific Tour	Lion City Sailors	1–5	Tottenham Hotspur	Kallang, Singapore
13:30 ICT	Anuar 14'	Report	Kane 45+4' (pen.); Richarlison 48', 52', 90+1'; Lo Celso 73'	Stadium: National Stadium; Attendance: 25,035; Referee: Andrea Verolino (Singapore)

6 August 2023 Friendly	Tottenham Hotspur	5–1	Shakhtar Donetsk	Tottenham
14:00 BST	Kane 38' (pen.), 50', 55', 79'; Romero (yellow card) 59'; Scarlett (yellow card) 84', (goal) 90+4'; Emerson (yellow card) 85'	Report	Kelsy 45'; Castillo (yellow card) 86'	Stadium: Tottenham Hotspur Stadium; Attendance: 56,331; Referee: David Coote (England)

8 August 2023 Joan Gamper Trophy	Barcelona	4–2	Tottenham Hotspur	Barcelona, Spain
20:00 CEST; 19:00 BST	Lewandowski 3'; Torres 81'; Fati 90+1'; Ezzalzouli 90+3'	Report	Skipp 24', 36'; Bissouma (yellow card) 26'	Stadium: Estadi Olímpic Lluís Companys; Attendance: 35,224; Referee: Jesús Gil Manzano (Spain)

22 May 2024 Global Football Week	Tottenham Hotspur	1–1 (4–5 p)	Newcastle United	Melbourne, Australia
19:45 AEST	Maddison 32'; Skipp (yellow card) 54'	Report	Isak 45'	Stadium: Melbourne Cricket Ground; Attendance: 78,419; Referee: Alireza Faghani (Australia)
	Penalties
	Gil (penalty missed); Scarlett (penalty scored); Donley (penalty scored); Hall (penalty scored); Skipp (penalty scored)		(penalty scored) White; (penalty scored) Parkinson; (penalty scored) Diallo; (penalty scored) Kuol; (penalty scored) Ashby

== Competitions ==
=== Overview ===
Competition	First match	Last match	Starting round	Final position	Record							
Competition	First match	Last match	Starting round	Final position	Pld	W	D	L	GF	GA	GD	Win %
Premier League	13 August 2023	19 May 2024	Matchday 1	5th	38	20	6	12	74	61	+13	52.63
FA Cup	5 January 2024	26 January 2024	Third round	Fourth round	2	1	0	1	1	1	+0	50.00
EFL Cup	29 August 2023		Second round	Second round	1	0	1	0	1	1	+0	0.00
Total					41	21	7	13	76	63	+13	51.22

Source: Soccerway

=== Premier League ===
==== League table ====
Pos	Team	Pld	W	D	L	GF	GA	GD	Pts	Qualification or relegation
3	Liverpool	38	24	10	4	86	41	+45	82	Qualification for the Champions League league phase
4	Aston Villa	38	20	8	10	76	61	+15	68	Qualification for the Champions League league phase
5	Tottenham Hotspur	38	20	6	12	74	61	+13	66	Qualification for the Europa League league phase
6	Chelsea	38	18	9	11	77	63	+14	63	Qualification for the Conference League play-off round (Note: Since the winners of the 2023–24 EFL Cup, Liverpool, qualified for the Champions League, the spot given to the League Cup winners (Conference League play-off round) was passed to the sixth-placed team.)
7	Newcastle United	38	18	6	14	85	62	+23	60	

Source: Premier League
Rules for classification: 1) Points; 2) Goal difference; 3) Goals scored; 4) If the champions, relegated teams or qualified teams for UEFA competitions cannot be determined by rules 1 to 3, rules 4.1 to 4.3 are applied – 4.1) Points gained in head-to-head record between such teams; 4.2) Away goals scored in head-to-head record between such teams; 4.3) Play-offs

==== Results summary ====
Overall								Home						Away					
Pld	W	D	L	GF	GA	GD	Pts	W	D	L	GF	GA	GD	W	D	L	GF	GA	GD
38	20	6	12	74	61	+13	66	13	0	6	38	27	+11	7	6	6	36	34	+2

Source: Premier League

==== Results by round ====
Round	1	2	3	4	5	6	7	8	9	10	11	12	13	14	15	16	17	18	19	20	21	22	23	24	25	27	28	29	30	31	32	33	35	26	36	37	34	38
Ground	A	H	A	A	H	A	H	A	H	A	H	A	H	A	H	H	A	H	A	H	A	H	A	H	H	H	A	A	H	A	H	A	H	A	A	H	H	A
Result	D	W	W	W	W	D	W	W	W	W	L	L	L	D	L	W	W	W	L	W	D	W	D	W	L	W	W	L	W	D	W	L	L	L	L	W	L	W
Position	9	6	3	2	2	4	2	1	1	1	2	4	5	5	5	5	5	4	5	5	5	4	5	4	5	5	5	5	5	5	4	5	5	5	5	5	5	5
Points	1	4	7	10	13	14	17	20	23	26	26	26	26	27	27	30	33	36	36	39	40	43	44	47	47	50	53	53	56	57	60	60	60	60	60	63	63	66

Source: Soccerway
A = Away; H = Home; W = Win; D = Draw; L = Loss; P = Postponed

==== Matches ====
The Premier League fixtures were announced on 15 June 2023.

13 August 2023 1	Brentford	2–2	Tottenham Hotspur	Brentford
14:00 BST	Mbeumo 27' (pen.); Wissa 36'; Hickey (yellow card) 62'	Report	Romero 11'; Vicario (yellow card) 26'; Sánchez (yellow card) 36'; Maddison (yellow card) 36'; Skipp (yellow card) 44'; Emerson 45+4'	Stadium: Brentford Community Stadium; Attendance: 17,066; Referee: Robert Jones
Note: Live on Sky Sports

19 August 2023 2	Tottenham Hotspur	2–0	Manchester United	Tottenham
17:30 BST	Sarr 49'; Udogie (yellow card) 63'; Martínez 83' (o.g.)	Report	Wan-Bissaka (yellow card) 33'; Antony (yellow card) 38'; Fernandes (yellow card) 39'	Stadium: Tottenham Hotspur Stadium; Attendance: 61,910; Referee: Michael Oliver
Note: Live on Sky Sports

26 August 2023 3	Bournemouth	0–2	Tottenham Hotspur	Bournemouth
12:30 BST	Kelly (yellow card) 45+1'	Report	Maddison 17'; Bissouma (yellow card) 53'; Richarlison (yellow card) 54'; Kulusevski 63'; Perišić (yellow card) 71'	Stadium: Dean Court; Attendance: 10,567; Referee: Tim Robinson
Note: Live on TNT Sports

2 September 2023 4	Burnley	2–5	Tottenham Hotspur	Burnley
15:00 BST	Foster 4'; Guðmundsson (yellow card) 43'; Brownhill (yellow card) 57', (goal) 90+4'; Beyer (yellow card) 74'; Delcroix (yellow card) 90+1'	Report	Son Heung-min 16', 63', 66'; Sarr (yellow card) 28'; Kulusevski (yellow card) 41'; Romero 45+2'; Maddison 54'; Højbjerg (yellow card) 81'	Stadium: Turf Moor; Attendance: 21,750; Referee: Darren England

16 September 2023 5	Tottenham Hotspur	2–1	Sheffield United	Tottenham
15:00 BST	Van de Ven (yellow card) 49'; Maddison (yellow card) 63'; Solomon (yellow card) 69'; Bissouma (yellow card) 86'; Richarlison 90+8', (yellow card) 90+16'; Kulusevski 90+10'; Perišić (yellow card) 90+13'	Report	Basham (yellow card) 29'; Archer (yellow card) 41'; Foderingham (yellow card) 45'; McBurnie (yellow card) 56' (yellow-red card) 90+14'; Robinson (yellow card) 63'; Hamer 73'; Davies (yellow card) 90+2'	Stadium: Tottenham Hotspur Stadium; Attendance: 61,706; Referee: Peter Bankes

24 September 2023 6	Arsenal	2–2	Tottenham Hotspur	Holloway
14:00 BST	Ødegaard (yellow card) 15'; Romero 26' (o.g.); Saka 54' (pen.); Havertz (yellow card) 57'; Nketiah (yellow card) 67'	Report	Udogie (yellow card) 15'; Son Heung-min 42', 55'; Sarr (yellow card) 45+1'; Bissouma (yellow card) 45+1'; Romero (yellow card) 75'	Stadium: Emirates Stadium; Attendance: 60,156; Referee: Robert Jones
Note: Live on Sky Sports

30 September 2023 7	Tottenham Hotspur	2–1	Liverpool	Tottenham
17:30 BST	Son Heung-min 36'; Udogie (yellow card) 45+3'; Bissouma (yellow card) 88'; Romero (yellow card) 89'; Matip 90+6' (o.g.); Porro (yellow card) 90+7'; Véliz (yellow card) 90+8'	Report	Jones (red card) 26'; Mac Allister (yellow card) 40'; Gakpo 45+4'; Salah (yellow card) 65'; Jota (yellow card) 68' (yellow-red card) 69'; Robertson (yellow card) 87'; Van Dijk (yellow card) 90+5'	Stadium: Tottenham Hotspur Stadium; Attendance: 62,001; Referee: Simon Hooper
Note: Live on Sky Sports

7 October 2023 8	Luton Town	0–1	Tottenham Hotspur	Luton
12:30 BST	Lockyer (yellow card) 19'; Morris (yellow card) 34'	Report	Bissouma (yellow card) 38' (yellow-red card) 45+4'; Van de Ven 52'; Højbjerg (yellow card) 68'	Stadium: Kenilworth Road; Attendance: 10,929; Referee: John Brooks
Note: Live on TNT Sports

23 October 2023 9	Tottenham Hotspur	2–0	Fulham	Tottenham
20:00 BST	Højbjerg (yellow card) 35'; Son Heung-min 36'; Maddison 54'; Vicario (yellow card) 85'	Report		Stadium: Tottenham Hotspur Stadium; Attendance: 61,286; Referee: Anthony Taylor
Note: Live on Sky Sports

27 October 2023 10	Crystal Palace	1–2	Tottenham Hotspur	Selhurst
20:00 BST	Ayew 90+4', (yellow card) 90+10'; Andersen (yellow card) 90+9'	Report	Ward 53' (o.g.); Son Heung-min 66'; Johnson (yellow card) 90+9'	Stadium: Selhurst Park; Attendance: 25,074; Referee: Andrew Madley
Note: Live on Sky Sports

6 November 2023 11	Tottenham Hotspur	1–4	Chelsea	Tottenham
20:00 GMT	Kulusevski 6'; Udogie (yellow card) 18' (yellow-red card) 55'; Romero (red card) 33'; Sarr (yellow card) 45+10'	Report	Palmer 35' (pen.); Jackson (yellow card) 45+10', (goal) 75', 90+4', 90+7'; Colwill (yellow card) 45+10'; Gusto (yellow card) 86'; Mudryk (yellow card) 89'; Ugochukwu (yellow card) 90+4'	Stadium: Tottenham Hotspur Stadium; Attendance: 61,726; Referee: Michael Oliver
Note: Live on Sky Sports

11 November 2023 12	Wolverhampton Wanderers	2–1	Tottenham Hotspur	Wolverhampton
12:30 GMT	Sarabia 90+1'; Dawson (yellow card) 90+5'; Doherty (yellow card) 90+6'; Lemina 90+7'; Aït-Nouri (yellow card) 90+9'; João Gomes (yellow card) 90+9'	Report	Johnson 3'; Emerson (yellow card) 45'; Bissouma (yellow card) 45+4'; Bentancur (yellow card) 89'	Stadium: Molineux Stadium; Attendance: 31,642; Referee: Tim Robinson
Note: Live on TNT Sports

26 November 2023 13	Tottenham Hotspur	1–2	Aston Villa	Tottenham
14:00 GMT	Lo Celso 22'	Report	Cash (yellow card) 27'; Kamara (yellow card) 38'; McGinn (yellow card) 41'; Torres 45+7'; Watkins 61', (yellow card) 82'	Stadium: Tottenham Hotspur Stadium; Attendance: 61,679; Referee: Robert Jones
Note: Live on Sky Sports

3 December 2023 14	Manchester City	3–3	Tottenham Hotspur	Manchester
16:30 GMT	Son Heung-min 9' (o.g.); Foden 31'; Rodri (yellow card) 34'; Grealish (yellow card) 61', (goal) 81'; Gvardiol (yellow card) 84'; Haaland (yellow card) 90+5'	Report	Son Heung-min 6'; Udogie (yellow card) 38'; Lo Celso 69'; Porro (yellow card) 74'; Kulusevski 90', (yellow card) 90+2'; Emerson (yellow card) 90+5'	Stadium: City of Manchester Stadium; Attendance: 53,473; Referee: Simon Hooper
Note: Live on Sky Sports

7 December 2023 15	Tottenham Hotspur	1–2	West Ham United	Tottenham
20:15 GMT	Romero 11', (yellow card) 89'; Porro (yellow card) 59'	Report	Bowen 52'; Emerson (yellow card) 57'; Ward-Prowse 74', (yellow card) 80'; Álvarez (yellow card) 90+2'	Stadium: Tottenham Hotspur Stadium; Attendance: 60,733; Referee: Michael Salisbury
Note: Live on Amazon Prime Video

10 December 2023 16	Tottenham Hotspur	4–1	Newcastle United	Tottenham
16:30 GMT	Udogie 26'; Richarlison 38', 60'; Romero (yellow card) 80'; Son Heung-min 85' (pen.)	Report	Lascelles (yellow card) 59'; Joelinton (yellow card) 69', (goal) 90+1'; Trippier (yellow card) 83'	Stadium: Tottenham Hotspur Stadium; Attendance: 61,171; Referee: Chris Kavanagh
Note: Live on Sky Sports

15 December 2023 17	Nottingham Forest	0–2	Tottenham Hotspur	West Bridgford
20:00 GMT	Murillo (yellow card) 82'; Toffolo (yellow card) 90'	Report	Udogie (yellow card) 42'; Richarlison 45+2'; Sarr (yellow card) 54'; Kulusevski 65'; Bissouma (red card) 70'; Davies (yellow card) 73'; Son Heung-min (yellow card) 79'	Stadium: City Ground; Attendance: 29,296; Referee: Jarred Gillett
Note: Live on Sky Sports

23 December 2023 18	Tottenham Hotspur	2–1	Everton	Tottenham
15:00 GMT	Richarlison 9'; Son Heung-min 18'; Kulusevski (yellow card) 86'	Report	Gueye (yellow card) 23'; Onana (yellow card) 26'; Gomes (yellow card) 76', (goal) 82'; Patterson (yellow card) 83'	Stadium: Tottenham Hotspur Stadium; Attendance: 61,808; Referee: Stuart Attwell

28 December 2023 19	Brighton & Hove Albion	4–2	Tottenham Hotspur	Brighton
19:30 GMT	Hinshelwood 11'; João Pedro 23' (pen.), 75' (pen.); Buonanotte (yellow card) 43'; Estupiñán 63'; Moder (yellow card) 70'; Dunk (yellow card) 82'	Report	Kulusevski (yellow card) 23'; Richarlison (yellow card) 57'; Véliz 81'; Davies 85'	Stadium: Falmer Stadium; Attendance: 31,675; Referee: Jarred Gillett
Note: Live on Amazon Prime Video

31 December 2023 20	Tottenham Hotspur	3–1	Bournemouth	Tottenham
14:00 GMT	Sarr 9'; Skipp (yellow card) 56'; Son Heung-min 71'; Richarlison 80'; Emerson (yellow card) 87'; Lo Celso (yellow card) 90+3'; Postecoglou (yellow card) 90+3'	Report	Kluivert (yellow card) 25'; Senesi (yellow card) 79'; Scott 84'; Semenyo (yellow card) 84'	Stadium: Tottenham Hotspur Stadium; Attendance: 61,780; Referee: Simon Hooper

14 January 2024 21	Manchester United	2–2	Tottenham Hotspur	Manchester
16:30 GMT	Højlund 3' (yellow card) 45+4'; Wan-Bissaka (yellow card) 24'; Rashford 40'	Report	Richarlison 19'; Bentancur (yellow card) 25', (goal) 46'	Stadium: Old Trafford; Attendance: 75,635; Referee: John Brooks
Note: Live on Sky Sports

31 January 2024 22	Tottenham Hotspur	3–2	Brentford	Tottenham
19:30 GMT	Kulusevski (yellow card) 43'; Udogie 48'; Johnson 49'; Richarlison 56'; Donley (yellow card) 90+6'	Report	Maupay 15', (yellow card) 43'; Nørgaard (yellow card) 17'; Toney 67'; Yarmolyuk (yellow card) 90'	Stadium: Tottenham Hotspur Stadium; Attendance: 61,210; Referee: David Coote
Note: The match was originally scheduled for 30 January 2024, but was moved for TV coverage.

3 February 2024 23	Everton	2–2	Tottenham Hotspur	Liverpool
12:30 GMT	Harrison 30'; Godfrey (yellow card) 60'; Garner (yellow card) 90+1'; Branthwaite 90+4'; Dobbin (yellow card) 90+8'	Report	Richarlison 4', 41'	Stadium: Goodison Park; Attendance: 39,321; Referee: Michael Oliver
Note: Live on TNT Sports

10 February 2024 24	Tottenham Hotspur	2–1	Brighton & Hove Albion	Tottenham
15:00 GMT	Maddison (yellow card) 35'; Sarr 61', (yellow card) 61'; Johnson 90+6'	Report	Groß 17' (pen.); Buonanotte (yellow card) 65'; Estupiñán (yellow card) 79'; Dunk (yellow card) 88'	Stadium: Tottenham Hotspur Stadium; Attendance: 61,445; Referee: Sam Barrott

17 February 2024 25	Tottenham Hotspur	1–2	Wolverhampton Wanderers	Tottenham
15:00 GMT	Kulusevski 46'	Report	João Gomes 42', 63', (yellow card) 66'	Stadium: Tottenham Hotspur Stadium; Attendance: 61,532; Referee: Anthony Taylor

2 March 2024 27	Tottenham Hotspur	3–1	Crystal Palace	Tottenham
15:00 GMT	Bentancur (yellow card) 57'; Werner 77'; Romero 80'; Son Heung-min 88'	Report	Lerma (yellow card) 50'; Eze 59'; Johnstone (yellow card) 75'	Stadium: Tottenham Hotspur Stadium; Attendance: 61,339; Referee: John Brooks

10 March 2024 28	Aston Villa	0–4	Tottenham Hotspur	Birmingham
13:00 GMT	McGinn (red card) 65'	Report	Sarr (yellow card) 19'; Maddison 50'; Johnson 53'; Drăgușin (yellow card) 61'; Son Heung-min 90+1'; Werner 90+4'	Stadium: Villa Park; Attendance: 42,310; Referee: Chris Kavanagh
Note: Fixture was originally scheduled for 9 March, but was moved for live Sky Sports coverage.

16 March 2024 29	Fulham	3–0	Tottenham Hotspur	Fulham
17:30 GMT	Muniz 42', 61'; Lukić 49'; Palhinha (yellow card) 55'; Reed (yellow card) 90+6'	Report	Bissouma (yellow card) 63'; Johnson (yellow card) 79'; Bentancur (yellow card) 90+6'	Stadium: Craven Cottage; Attendance: 24,410; Referee: Robert Jones
Note: Fixture was originally scheduled for a 15:00 kick-off, but was pushed back for live Sky Sports coverage.

30 March 2024 30	Tottenham Hotspur	2–1	Luton Town	Tottenham
15:00 GMT	Kaboré 51' (o.g.); Son Heung-min 86'; Højbjerg (yellow card) 90+5'; Lo Celso (yellow card) 90+6'	Report	Chong 3'; Barkley (yellow card) 31'; Burke (yellow card) 36'; Mpanzu (yellow card) 46'; Mengi (yellow card) 90'	Stadium: Tottenham Hotspur Stadium; Attendance: 61,534; Referee: Jarred Gillett

2 April 2024 31	West Ham United	1–1	Tottenham Hotspur	Stratford
20:15 BST	Zouma 19'; Antonio (yellow card) 53'	Report	Johnson 5', (yellow card) 74'; Van de Ven (yellow card) 44'; Bentancur (yellow card) 61'; Romero (yellow card) 89'	Stadium: London Stadium; Attendance: 62,469; Referee: John Brooks

7 April 2024 32	Tottenham Hotspur	3–1	Nottingham Forest	Tottenham
18:00 BST	Murillo 15' (o.g.); Werner (yellow card) 25'; Van de Ven 52'; Porro 58'; Bentancur (yellow card) 60'	Report	Yates (yellow card) 14'; Wood 27'; Gibbs-White (yellow card) 56'; Williams (yellow card) 71'; Danilo (yellow card) 78'	Stadium: Tottenham Hotspur Stadium; Attendance: 61,098; Referee: Simon Hooper

13 April 2024 33	Newcastle United	4–0	Tottenham Hotspur	Newcastle upon Tyne
12:30 BST	Isak 30', 51'; Gordon 32'; Schär 87'	Report	Van de Ven (yellow card) 27'; Bissouma (yellow card) 47'; Romero (yellow card) 56'; Maddison (yellow card) 61'	Stadium: St James' Park; Attendance: 52,206; Referee: Tim Robinson

28 April 2024 35	Tottenham Hotspur	2–3	Arsenal	Tottenham
14:00 BST	Romero 64'; Kulusevski (yellow card) 77'; Davies (yellow card) 81'; Son Heung-min 87' (pen.)	Report	Højbjerg 15' (o.g.); Saka 27'; Havertz 38'; Partey (yellow card) 83'	Stadium: Tottenham Hotspur Stadium; Attendance: 61,554; Referee: Michael Oliver

2 May 2024 26	Chelsea	2–0	Tottenham Hotspur	Fulham
19:30 BST	Chalobah 24'; Jackson 72'	Report	Van de Ven (yellow card) 67'	Stadium: Stamford Bridge; Attendance: 39,086; Referee: Robert Jones
Note: Fixture was previously postponed due to Chelsea's participation in the EFL Cup final.

5 May 2024 36	Liverpool	4–2	Tottenham Hotspur	Liverpool
16:30 BST	Salah 16'; Robertson 45'; Gakpo 50'; Elliott 59'; Alexander-Arnold (yellow card) 90+2'	Report	Sarr (yellow card) 44'; Van de Ven (yellow card) 47'; Emerson (yellow card) 57'; Bissouma (yellow card) 63'; Richarlison 72'; Son Heung-min 77'	Stadium: Anfield; Attendance: 60,075; Referee: Paul Tierney
Note: Fixture was initially scheduled for a 15:00 kick-off, but was moved for live Sky Sports broadcast.

11 May 2024 37	Tottenham Hotspur	2–1	Burnley	Tottenham
15:00 BST	Porro 32'; Maddison (yellow card) 47'; Skipp (yellow card) 55'; Van de Ven 82'; Sarr (yellow card) 87'	Report	Cullen (yellow card) 11'; Bruun Larsen 25', (yellow card) 67'; Taylor (yellow card) 46'; Berge (yellow card) 65'; Assignon (yellow card) 90+1'	Stadium: Tottenham Hotspur Stadium; Attendance: 61,148; Referee: Jarred Gillett

14 May 2024 34	Tottenham Hotspur	0–2	Manchester City	Tottenham
20:00 BST	Bentancur (yellow card) 36'; Sarr (yellow card) 57'; Romero (yellow card) 63'	Report	Haaland 51', 90+1' (pen.); Kovačić (yellow card) 70'; Foden (yellow card) 88'; Silva (yellow card) 90+10'	Stadium: Tottenham Hotspur Stadium; Attendance: 61,065; Referee: Chris Kavanagh
Note: Fixture was postponed due to Manchester City's participation in the FA Cup semi-finals.

19 May 2024 38	Sheffield United	0–3	Tottenham Hotspur	Sheffield
16:00 BST	Vinícius (yellow card) 37'; Robinson (yellow card) 90+3'	Report	Kulusevski 14', 65'; Porro 59'	Stadium: Bramall Lane; Attendance: 29,116; Referee: Andrew Madley

=== FA Cup ===
As a Premier League club, Tottenham entered the FA Cup in the third round, and were drawn at home against fellow Premier League side Burnley. They were then drawn at home to Manchester City in the fourth round.

5 January 2024 Third round	Tottenham Hotspur	1–0	Burnley	Tottenham
20:00 GMT	Porro 78'; Gil (yellow card) 90+7'	Report	Cullen (yellow card) 21'; Trésor (yellow card) 90+1'	Stadium: Tottenham Hotspur Stadium; Attendance: 60,982; Referee: Sam Barrott
Note: Live on ITV 1

26 January 2024 Fourth round	Tottenham Hotspur	0–1	Manchester City	Tottenham
20:00 GMT	Udogie (yellow card) 59'; Vicario (yellow card) 88'; Porro (yellow card) 90+6'	Report	Kovačić (yellow card) 56'; Dias (yellow card) 70'; Gvardiol (yellow card) 84'; Aké 88'; Doku (yellow card) 90+6'	Stadium: Tottenham Hotspur Stadium; Attendance: 60,872; Referee: Paul Tierney
Note: Live on ITV 1

=== EFL Cup ===
Tottenham entered the EFL Cup in the second round as one of the Premier League teams not participating in any European competitions, and were drawn away to Fulham.

29 August 2023 Second round	Fulham	1–1 (5–3 p)	Tottenham Hotspur	Fulham
19:45 BST	Van de Ven 19' (o.g.)	Report	Richarlison 56'; Skipp (yellow card) 63'; Van de Ven (yellow card) 76'	Stadium: Craven Cottage; Attendance: 21,043; Referee: Josh Smith
	Penalties
	Pereira (penalty scored); Jiménez (penalty scored); Wilson (penalty scored); Palhinha (penalty scored); Tete (penalty scored)		(penalty scored) Son Heung-min; (penalty scored) Kulusevski; (penalty missed) Sánchez; (penalty scored) Maddison

== Statistics ==
=== Appearances ===
No.	Pos.	Player	Premier League		FA Cup		EFL Cup		Total	
No.	Pos.	Player	Apps	Goals	Apps	Goals	Apps	Goals	Apps	Goals
Goalkeepers
13	GK	(Italy) Guglielmo Vicario	38	0	2	0	1	0	41	0
20	GK	(England) Fraser Forster	0	0	0	0	0	0	0	0
Defenders
6	DF	(Romania) Radu Drăgușin	4+5	0	0	0	0	0	4+5	0
12	DF	(Brazil) Emerson Royal	11+11	1	1	0	1	0	13+11	1
17	DF	(Argentina) Cristian Romero	33	5	1	0	0	0	34	5
19	DF	(England) Ryan Sessegnon	0	0	0+1	0	0	0	0+1	0
23	DF	(Spain) Pedro Porro	35	3	2	1	0	0	37	4
33	DF	(Wales) Ben Davies	12+5	1	1	0	1	0	14+5	1
37	DF	(Netherlands) Micky van de Ven	27	3	1	0	1	0	29	3
38	DF	(Italy) Destiny Udogie	28	2	2	0	0	0	30	2
Midfielders
4	MF	(England) Oliver Skipp	5+16	0	1+1	0	1	0	7+17	0
5	MF	(Denmark) Pierre-Emile Højbjerg	8+28	0	1+1	0	1	0	10+29	0
8	MF	(Mali) Yves Bissouma	25+2	0	0	0	0	0	26+2	0
10	MF	(England) James Maddison	26+2	4	0+1	0	0+1	0	26+4	4
18	MF	(Argentina) Giovani Lo Celso	4+18	2	1	0	1	0	6+18	2
29	MF	(Senegal) Pape Matar Sarr	27+7	3	0	0	0+1	0	27+8	3
30	MF	(Uruguay) Rodrigo Bentancur	13+10	1	2	0	0	0	15+10	1
Forwards
7	FW	(South Korea) Son Heung-min	34+1	17	0	0	0+1	0	34+2	17
9	FW	(Brazil) Richarlison	18+10	11	2	0	1	1	21+10	12
11	FW	(Spain) Bryan Gil	2+9	0	0+1	0	0	0	2+10	0
16	FW	(Germany) Timo Werner	10+3	2	1	0	0	0	11+3	2
21	FW	(Sweden) Dejan Kulusevski	31+5	8	2	0	0+1	0	33+6	8
22	FW	(Wales) Brennan Johnson	23+9	5	2	0	0	0	25+9	5
27	FW	(Israel) Manor Solomon	2+3	0	0	0	1	0	3+3	0
44	FW	(England) Dane Scarlett	0+4	0	0+2	0	0+1	0	0+7	0
59	FW	(England) Mikey Moore	0+2	0	0	0	0	0	0+2	0
63	FW	(England) Jamie Donley	0+3	0	0+1	0	0	0	0+4	0
Players transferred out during the season
6	DF	(Colombia) Davinson Sánchez	0+1	0	0	0	1	0	1+1	0
14	MF	(Croatia) Ivan Perišić	0+5	0	0	0	1	0	1+5	0
15	DF	(England) Eric Dier	1+3	0	0	0	0	0	1+3	0
36	FW	(Argentina) Alejo Véliz	0+8	1	0	0	0	0	0+8	1

Source: Premier League

=== Goalscorers ===
The list is sorted by squad number when total goals are equal.

Rank	Pos.	No.	Player	Premier League	FA Cup	EFL Cup	Total
1	FW	7	(South Korea) Son Heung-min	17	0	0	17
2	FW	9	(Brazil) Richarlison	11	0	1	12
3	FW	21	(Sweden) Dejan Kulusevski	8	0	0	8
4	DF	17	(Argentina) Cristian Romero	5	0	0	5
4	FW	22	(Wales) Brennan Johnson	5	0	0	5
6	MF	10	(England) James Maddison	4	0	0	4
6	DF	23	(Spain) Pedro Porro	3	1	0	4
8	MF	29	(Senegal) Pape Matar Sarr	3	0	0	3
8	DF	37	(Netherlands) Micky van de Ven	3	0	0	3
10	FW	16	(Germany) Timo Werner	2	0	0	2
10	MF	18	(Argentina) Giovani Lo Celso	2	0	0	2
10	DF	38	(Italy) Destiny Udogie	2	0	0	2
13	DF	12	(Brazil) Emerson Royal	1	0	0	1
13	MF	30	(Uruguay) Rodrigo Bentancur	1	0	0	1
13	DF	33	(Wales) Ben Davies	1	0	0	1
13	FW	36	(Argentina) Alejo Véliz	1	0	0	1
Totals				69	1	1	71

Source: Premier League

==== Hat-tricks ====
Key
Score	The score is at the time of the goals.		
(H)	Tottenham were the home team.	(A)	Tottenham were the away team.

Pos.	Nat.	Player	Minutes	Score	Result	Opponent	Competition	Date
FW	(South Korea)	Son Heung-min	16', 63', 66'	1–1, 1–4, 1–5	2–5 (A)	Burnley	Premier League	2 September 2023

==== Own goals ====
Key
Score	The score is at the time of the own goal.		
(H)	Tottenham were the home team.	(A)	Tottenham were the away team.

Pos.	Nat.	Player	Minute	Score	Result	Opponent	Competition	Date
DF	(Netherlands)	Micky van de Ven	19'	1-0	1–1 (A)	Fulham	EFL Cup	29 August 2023
DF	(Argentina)	Cristian Romero	26'	1-0	2–2 (A)	Arsenal	Premier League	24 September 2023
FW	(South Korea)	Son Heung-min	9'	1-1	3–3 (A)	Manchester City	Premier League	3 December 2023
MF	(Denmark)	Pierre-Emile Højbjerg	15'	0–1	2–3 (H)	Arsenal	Premier League	28 April 2024

=== Disciplinary ===
The list is sorted by squad number when total cards are equal.

Rank	Pos.	No.	Player	Premier League			FA Cup			EFL Cup			Total		
Rank	Pos.	No.	Player	Yellow card	(yellow card) (yellow-red card)	Red card	Yellow card	(yellow card) (yellow-red card)	Red card	Yellow card	(yellow card) (yellow-red card)	Red card	Yellow card	(yellow card) (yellow-red card)	Red card
1	MF	8	(Mali) Yves Bissouma	8	1	1	0	0	0	0	0	0	8	1	1
2	MF	29	(Senegal) Pape Matar Sarr	9	0	0	0	0	0	0	0	0	9	0	0
2	DF	38	(Italy) Destiny Udogie	5	1	0	1	0	0	0	0	0	6	1	0
4	DF	17	(Argentina) Cristian Romero	7	0	1	0	0	0	0	0	0	7	0	1
5	MF	21	(Sweden) Dejan Kulusevski	7	0	0	0	0	0	0	0	0	7	0	0
5	MF	30	(Uruguay) Rodrigo Bentancur	7	0	0	0	0	0	0	0	0	7	0	0
7	MF	10	(England) James Maddison	5	0	0	0	0	0	0	0	0	5	0	0
7	DF	37	(Netherlands) Micky van de Ven	5	0	0	0	0	0	1	0	0	6	0	0
9	MF	4	(England) Oliver Skipp	3	0	0	0	0	0	1	0	0	4	0	0
9	MF	5	(Denmark) Pierre-Emile Højbjerg	4	0	0	0	0	0	0	0	0	4	0	0
9	DF	12	(Brazil) Emerson Royal	4	0	0	0	0	0	0	0	0	4	0	0
9	DF	23	(Spain) Pedro Porro	3	0	0	1	0	0	0	0	0	4	0	0
13	FW	9	(Brazil) Richarlison	3	0	0	0	0	0	0	0	0	3	0	0
13	GK	13	(Italy) Guglielmo Vicario	2	0	0	1	0	0	0	0	0	3	0	0
13	FW	22	(Wales) Brennan Johnson	3	0	0	0	0	0	0	0	0	3	0	0
16	MF	14	(Croatia) Ivan Perišić	2	0	0	0	0	0	0	0	0	2	0	0
16	MF	18	(Argentina) Giovani Lo Celso	2	0	0	0	0	0	0	0	0	2	0	0
16	DF	33	(Wales) Ben Davies	2	0	0	0	0	0	0	0	0	2	0	0
19	DF	6	(Romania) Radu Drăgușin	1	0	0	0	0	0	0	0	0	1	0	0
19	DF	6	(Colombia) Davinson Sánchez	1	0	0	0	0	0	0	0	0	1	0	0
19	FW	7	(South Korea) Son Heung-min	1	0	0	0	0	0	0	0	0	1	0	0
19	FW	11	(Spain) Bryan Gil	0	0	0	1	0	0	0	0	0	1	0	0
19	FW	16	(Germany) Timo Werner	1	0	0	0	0	0	0	0	0	1	0	0
19	MF	27	(Israel) Manor Solomon	1	0	0	0	0	0	0	0	0	1	0	0
19	FW	36	(Argentina) Alejo Véliz	1	0	0	0	0	0	0	0	0	1	0	0
19	FW	63	(England) Jamie Donley	1	0	0	0	0	0	0	0	0	1	0	0
Totals				88	2	2	4	0	0	2	0	0	94	2	2

Source: Premier League

=== Clean sheets ===
The list is sorted by squad number when total clean sheets are equal.

Rank	No.	Player	Premier League	FA Cup	EFL Cup	Total
1	13	(Italy) Guglielmo Vicario	7	1	0	8
Totals			7	1	0	8

Source: Premier League

=== Awards ===
==== Premier League Manager of the Month ====
Month	Nat.	Manager	Pld	W	D	L	GF	GA	GD	Pts	Pos	Result	Ref.
August	(Australia)	Ange Postecoglou	3	2	1	0	6	2	+4	7	3rd	Won	
September	(Australia)	Ange Postecoglou	4	3	1	0	11	6	+5	10	2nd	Won	
October	(Australia)	Ange Postecoglou	3	3	0	0	5	1	+4	9	1st	Won	
March	(Australia)	Ange Postecoglou	4	3	0	1	9	5	+4	9	4th	Nominated	

==== Premier League Player of the Month ====
Month	Pos.	Nat.	Player	Result	Ref.
August	MF	(England)	James Maddison	Won	
September	FW	(South Korea)	Son Heung-min	Won	
October	DF	(Argentina)	Cristian Romero	Nominated	
December	FW	(South Korea)	Son Heung-min	Nominated	
January	FW	(Brazil)	Richarlison	Nominated	
March	FW	(South Korea)	Son Heung-min	Nominated	

==== Premier League Save of the Month ====
Month	Nat.	Player	Opponent	Date	Result	Ref.
August	(Italy)	Guglielmo Vicario	Manchester United	19 August 2023	Nominated	
September	(Italy)	Guglielmo Vicario	Burnley	2 September 2023	Nominated	
October	(Italy)	Guglielmo Vicario	Fulham	23 October 2023	Nominated	
November	(Italy)	Guglielmo Vicario	Chelsea	6 November 2023	Nominated	
December	(Italy)	Guglielmo Vicario	Brighton	28 December 2023	Nominated	
February	(Italy)	Guglielmo Vicario	Everton	3 February 2024	Nominated	

== See also ==
- 2023–24 in English football
- List of Tottenham Hotspur F.C. seasons
