= Destiny Udogie =

Italian footballer (born 2002)

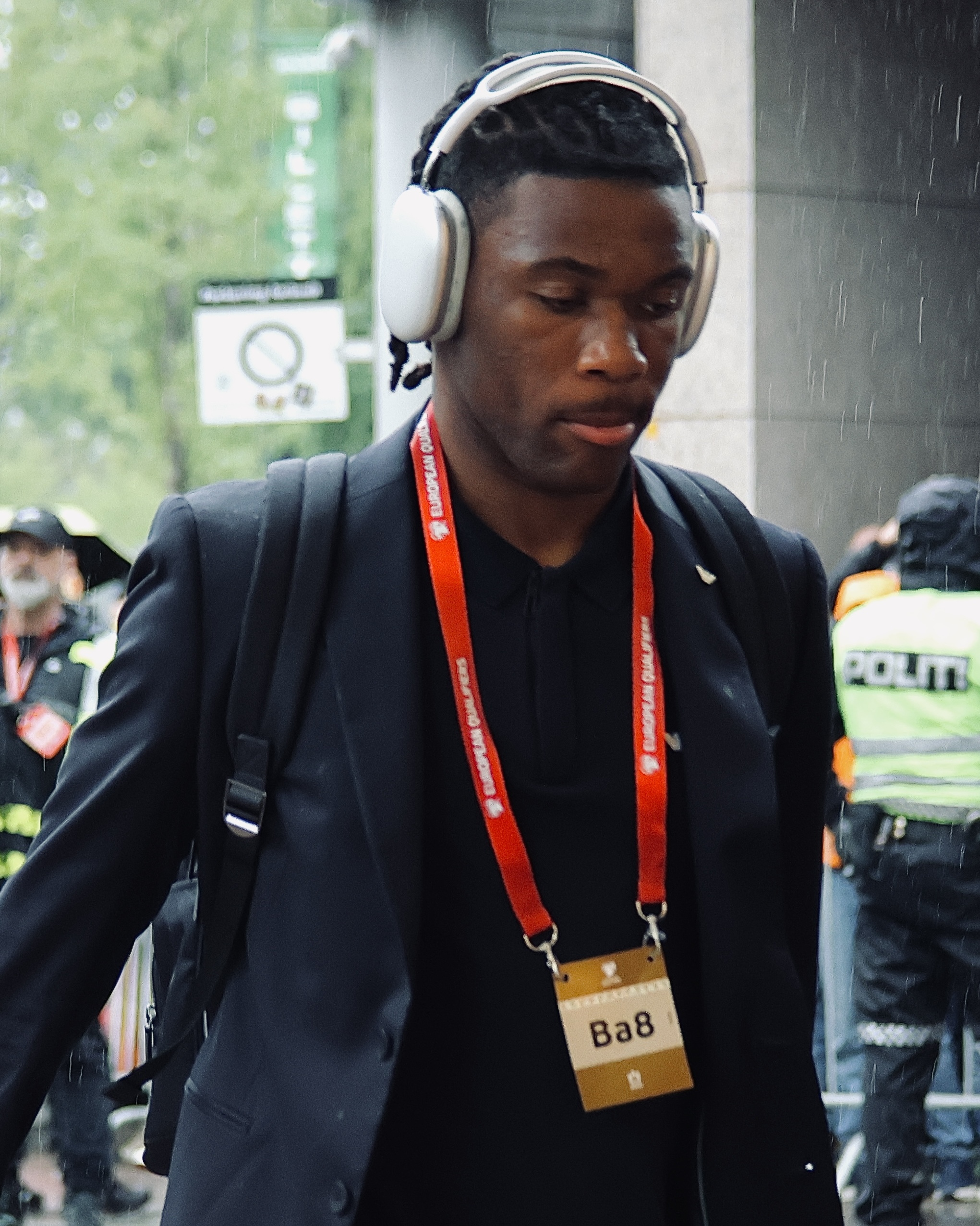
- Destiny Udogie in 2025

Personal information
- Full name: Iyenoma Destiny Udogie
- Date of birth: 28 November 2002 (age 23)
- Place of birth: Verona, Italy
- Height: 1.86 m (6 ft 1 in)
- Position: Left-back

Team information
- Current team: Tottenham Hotspur
- Number: 13

Youth career
- 2017–2020: Hellas Verona

Senior career*
Years	Team	Apps	(Gls)
2020–2022	Hellas Verona	6	(0)
2021–2022	→ Udinese (loan)	35	(5)
2022	Udinese	0	(0)
2022–	Tottenham Hotspur	76	(2)
2022–2023	→ Udinese (loan)	33	(3)

International career^{‡}
2018–2019	Italy U16	2	(0)
2018–2019	Italy U17	15	(2)
2019–2020	Italy U18	8	(1)
2019–2020	Italy U19	4	(0)
2021–2023	Italy U21	8	(0)
2023–	Italy	12	(0)
- * Club domestic league appearances and goals as of 23:52, 5 September 2026 (UTC) ‡ National team caps and goals as of 6 June 2025

Iyenoma Destiny Udogie (Italian pronunciation: [ˈdɛstini uˈdɔːɡi]; born 28 November 2002) is an Italian professional footballer who plays as a left-back for Premier League club Tottenham Hotspur and the Italy national team.

== Club career ==
=== Hellas Verona ===
Udogie developed in the Hellas Verona youth system, and made his Serie A debut on 8 November 2020, in a 2–2 draw away to Milan.

=== Udinese ===
On 15 July 2021, Udogie joined Udinese on a season-long loan with an obligation to buy. During his debut season, he made 37 appearances for the club, primarily as a left wingback, and scored five goals. Following his debut season, Udinese activated the option-to-buy clause for a reported €4 million.

=== Tottenham Hotspur ===
On 16 August 2022, Tottenham Hotspur confirmed that they had signed Udogie on a permanent transfer for a fee of €20 million until 2027, with Udogie immediately loaned back to Udinese for the 2022–23 season. Udogie made his debut for Tottenham on 13 August 2023 during the first matchday of the 2023–24 Premier League season, starting in an away match against Brentford. On 10 December, he scored his first Premier League goal for Tottenham in a 4–1 victory over Newcastle United. On 12 December, Udogie signed a new contract at the club, running to 2030. His first season with Spurs was cut short in April 2024, as he underwent surgery following an injury to his left quadriceps. On 9 May, Udogie was nominated for the Premier League Young Player of the Season Award.

== International career ==
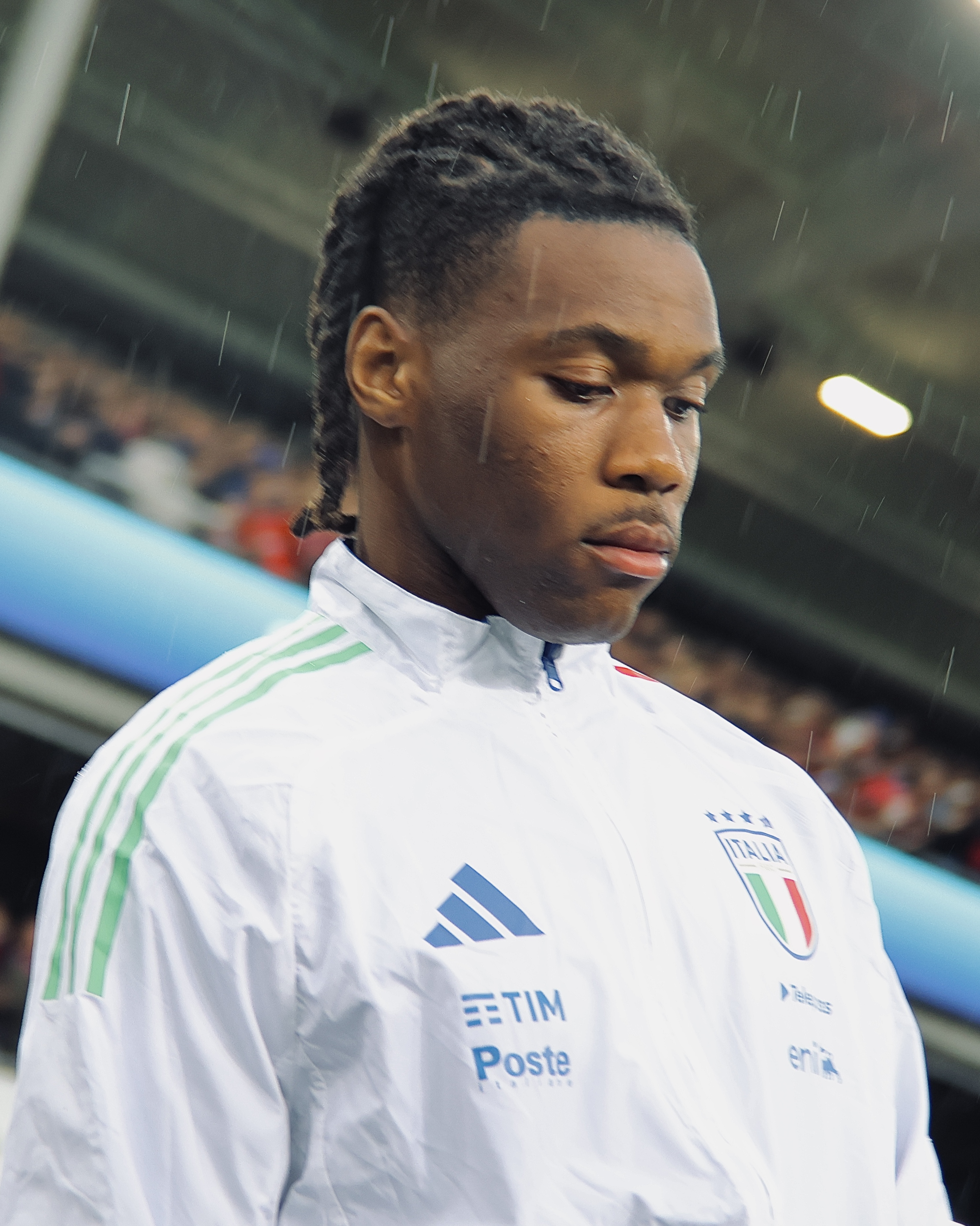
Udogie with Italy in 2025

Born in Italy, Udogie is of Nigerian descent. He was a youth international for Italy.

On 3 September 2021, he made his debut with the Italy U21 squad, starting in the 2023 UEFA European Under-21 Championship qualifying match against Luxembourg, which ended in a 3–0 win.

On 6 October 2023, Udogie received his first official call-up to the Italian senior national team by head coach Luciano Spalletti for their UEFA Euro 2024 qualifiers against Malta and England. He then made his debut for Italy on 14 October 2023, coming on as a substitute in the 79th minute of the former match: in the process, he assisted Davide Frattesi's closing goal in a 4–0 victory. Three days later, he made his first international start in a 3–1 loss to England at the Wembley Stadium. Udogie sustained an injury during his first full season with Tottenham Hotspur which in turn ruled him out of the 2024 UEFA Euro and Italy's European Championship team. Italy was later eliminated in the Round of 16 by Switzerland.

== Style of play ==
Considered to be a promising player in the media, Udogie is a tall, tactically versatile, quick, and physically powerful defender, with good technique, vision, and stamina, who likes to make attacking runs with the ball. He mainly plays as a left-sided full-back or wing-back, although he is also capable of playing as a wide midfielder, or in the centre of defence, or even in midfield as a mezzala or defensive midfielder. During his time at Tottenham, he improved his all-round gameplay, showing significant developments. He has cited Brazilian attacking left-back Marcelo as a major influence.

== Career statistics ==
=== Club ===
As of match played 15 September 2026

Appearances and goals by club, season and competition
Club	Season	League			National cup (Note: Includes Coppa Italia, FA Cup)		League cup (Note: Includes EFL Cup)		Europe		Total	
Club	Season	Division	Apps	Goals	Apps	Goals	Apps	Goals	Apps	Goals	Apps	Goals
Hellas Verona	2020–21	Serie A	6	0	1	0	—		—		7	0
Udinese (loan)	2021–22	Serie A	35	5	2	0	—		—		37	5
Udinese (loan)	2022–23	Serie A	33	3	1	0	—		—		34	3
Udinese (loan)	Total		68	8	3	0	—		—		71	8
Tottenham Hotspur	2023–24	Premier League	28	2	2	0	0	0	—		30	2
Tottenham Hotspur	2024–25	Premier League	25	0	0	0	2	0	9 (Note: Appearances in UEFA Europa League)	0	36	0
Tottenham Hotspur	2025–26	Premier League	20	0	0	0	1	0	7 (Note: Appearances in UEFA Champions League)	0	28	0
Tottenham Hotspur	2026–27	Premier League	3	0	0	0	2	0	—		5	0
Tottenham Hotspur	Total		76	2	2	0	5	0	16	0	99	2
Career total			150	10	6	0	5	0	16	0	175	10

=== International ===
As of match played 6 June 2025

Appearances and goals by national team and year
National team	Year	Apps	Goals
Italy	2023	2	0
Italy	2024	7	0
Italy	2025	3	0
Total		12	0

== Honours ==
Tottenham Hotspur

- UEFA Europa League: 2024–25
