= Festy Ebosele =

Irish footballer (born 2002)

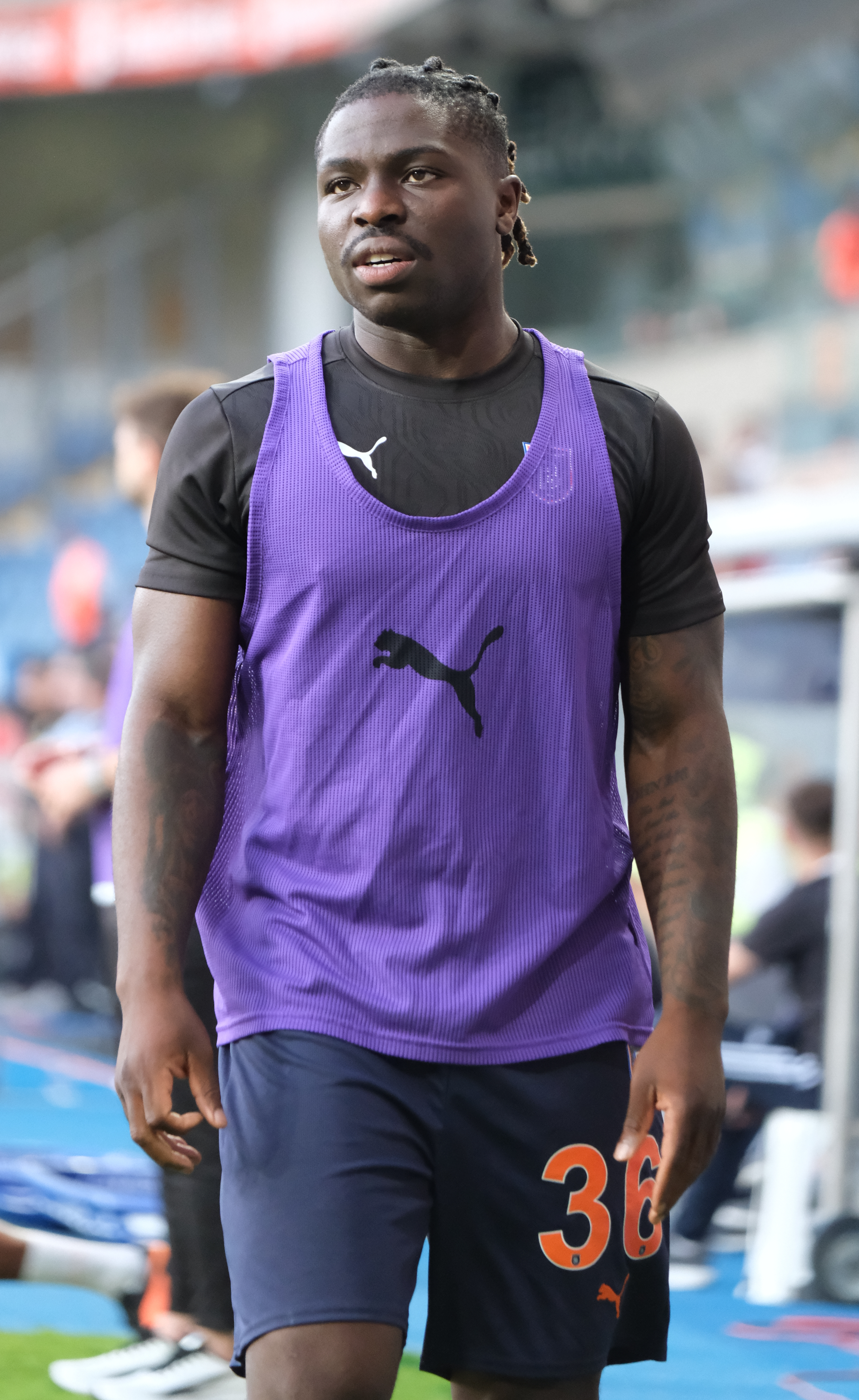
- Ebosele with İstanbul Başakşehir in 2025

Personal information
- Full name: Festy Oseiwe Ebosele
- Date of birth: 2 August 2002 (age 24)
- Place of birth: Enniscorthy, Ireland
- Height: 1.80 m (5 ft 11 in)
- Positions: Right-back; right wing-back

Team information
- Current team: Erzurumspor (on loan from İstanbul Başakşehir)
- Number: 2

Youth career
- 2010–2016: Moyne Rangers
- 2016–2018: Bray Wanderers
- 2018–2021: Derby County

Senior career*
Years	Team	Apps	(Gls)
2021–2022	Derby County	38	(2)
2022–2025	Udinese	48	(0)
2024–2025	→ Watford (loan)	18	(1)
2025–	İstanbul Başakşehir	21	(0)
2026–	→ Erzurumspor (loan)	5	(0)

International career^{‡}
2018	Republic of Ireland U16	2	(0)
2018–2019	Republic of Ireland U17	7	(1)
2019–2020	Republic of Ireland U19	7	(0)
2021–2023	Republic of Ireland U21	5	(0)
2023–	Republic of Ireland	13	(0)
- * Club domestic league appearances and goals as of 00:06, 2 October 2026 (UTC) ‡ National team caps and goals as of 16:24, 16 November 2025 (UTC)

Festy Oseiwe Ebosele (born 2 August 2002) is an Nigerian professional footballer who plays as a right-back or right wing-back for Süper Lig club Erzurumspor, on loan from İstanbul Başakşehir, and the Republic of Ireland national team.

== Early years ==
Ebosele was born in the town of Enniscorthy in County Wexford, Ireland to Nigerian parents. His name comes for the Latin word festus, meaning "joyful".

He began playing football for Moyne Rangers in 2010 before joining the academy of League of Ireland side Bray Wanderers when he was 14-years-old. Two years later in 2018, he signed for English Championship side Derby County.

== Club career ==
=== Derby County ===
Ebosele made his debut for Derby County as a substitute in a 2–0 FA Cup loss to Chorley on 9 January 2021. He was one of fourteen players from Derby County's academy to make their debut in the game, after the entirety of Derby's first team squad and coaching team were forced to isolate due to a COVID-19 outbreak. He made his league debut as a substitute in a 1–0 loss to Norwich City on 10 April 2021. On 6 November 2021, Ebosele scored a first senior goal in a 1–1 draw at Millwall. In January 2022, Ebosele was linked to a move to Derby County's rivals Nottingham Forest, however Ebosele was said to have rejected the prospect of a move.

In March 2022, with Derby being unable to offer Ebosele new contract terms due to the restrictions put on the club by the EFL whilst in administration, it was confirmed that Ebosele would join Udinese at the end of his Derby contract in summer 2022, signing a five-year deal with the Serie A club. In the weeks following the transfer, Derby manager Wayne Rooney questioned Ebosele's attitude and had him training with the Under-23 squad. Ebosele later got back into the team and finished the season with 37 appearances in all competitions, scoring two goals.

=== Udinese ===
On 21 March 2022, it was announced that Ebosele would join Italian Serie A club Udinese on a five-year contract starting in the summer of 2022. The transfer was confirmed by Derby County on 4 July, as the club was also entitled to compensation due to Ebosele's homegrown status.

==== Loan to Watford ====
On 30 August 2024, Ebosele signed for Championship club Watford on a season-long loan. He returned to his parent club at the end of January amidst transfer interest in him.

=== İstanbul Başakşehir ===
On 31 January 2025, Ebosele made the permanent move to Turkish Süper Lig club İstanbul Başakşehir on a 3 and a half year contract. On 21 August 2025, he scored his first goal for the club, in a 2–1 loss at home to Romanian side Universitatea Craiova in the UEFA Conference League. After struggling to get regular minutes, in January 2026 Ebosele was linked with a move to EFL Championship club West Bromwich Albion, though the move never materialised before the transfer window closed.

==== Erzurumspor loan ====
On 9 August 2026, Ebosele signed for newly promoted Süper Lig side Erzurumspor on a season-long-loan deal.

== International career ==
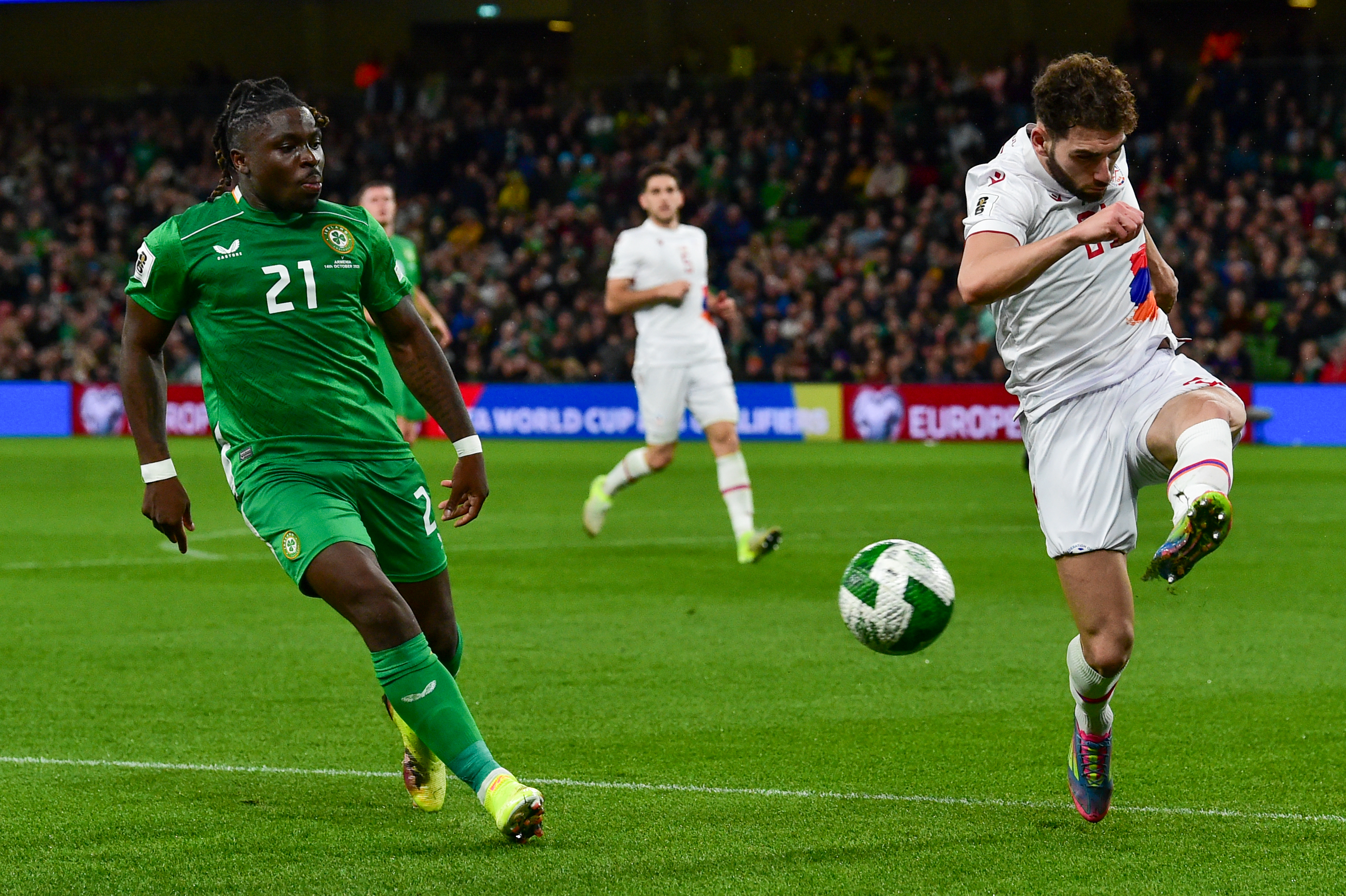
Ebosele (left) with Ireland in 2025

Born in Ireland, Ebosele is of Nigerian descent, so he could choose to represent either of the respective countries at international level. He has represented the Republic of Ireland at U16, U17, U19, U21 and senior levels ever since.

He then received his first call-up to the Republic of Ireland senior national team on 25 May 2022, ahead of their UEFA Nations League games against Armenia, Ukraine and Scotland.

On 7 September 2023, he made his senior debut for Republic of Ireland, replacing Chiedozie Ogbene from the bench in the 84th minute of a 2–0 loss to France at Parc des Princes. He provided a pinpoint cross for Robbie Brady's Nations League 88th-minute winner in Ireland's 2–1 victory over Finland in Helsinki on 10 October 2024.

== Personal life ==
His sister, Lystus Ebosele, goes by the moniker Cyclone on BBC One light entertainment television show Gladiators.

== Career statistics ==
=== Club ===
As of match played on 19 September 2026

Appearances and goals by club, season and competition
Club	Season	League			National cup (Note: Includes FA Cup, Coppa Italia & Turkish Cup)		League cup (Note: Includes EFL Cup)		Other		Total	
Club	Season	Division	Apps	Goals	Apps	Goals	Apps	Goals	Apps	Goals	Apps	Goals
Derby County	2020–21	Championship	3	0	1	0	0	0	—		4	0
Derby County	2021–22	Championship	35	2	1	0	1	0	—		37	2
Derby County	Total		38	2	2	0	1	0	—		41	2
Udinese	2022–23	Serie A	17	0	1	0	—		—		18	0
Udinese	2023–24	Serie A	31	0	1	0	—		—		32	0
Udinese	2024–25	Serie A	0	0	—		—		—		0	0
Udinese	Total		48	0	2	0	—		—		50	0
Watford (loan)	2024–25	Championship	18	1	0	0	1	0	—		19	1
İstanbul Başakşehir	2024–25	Süper Lig	7	0	0	0	—		—		7	0
İstanbul Başakşehir	2025–26	Süper Lig	14	0	3	0	—		3 (Note: Appearances in the UEFA Conference League)	1	20	1
İstanbul Başakşehir	2026–27	Süper Lig	—		—		—		0	0	0	0
İstanbul Başakşehir	Total		21	0	3	0	—		3	1	27	1
Erzurumspor (loan)	2026–27	Süper Lig	5	0	0	0	—		—		5	0
Career total			130	3	7	0	2	0	3	1	142	4

=== International ===
As of match played 16 November 2025

Appearances and goals by national team and year
National team	Year	Apps	Goals
Republic of Ireland	2023	2	0
Republic of Ireland	2024	5	0
Republic of Ireland	2025	6	0
Total		13	0
