= Nicolò Cocetta =

Italian footballer (born 2003)

Personal information
- Date of birth: 19 December 2003 (age 22)
- Place of birth: San Daniele del Friuli, Italy
- Height: 1.84 m (6 ft 0 in)
- Position: Centre-back

Team information
- Current team: Bari
- Number: 72

Youth career
- 2010–2023: Udinese

Senior career*
Years	Team	Apps	(Gls)
2023	Udinese	1	(0)
2023–2025	Turris	43	(2)
2025–2026	Crotone	29	(0)
2026–	Bari	2	(0)
- * Club domestic league appearances and goals as of 28 August 2026

Nicolò Cocetta (born 19 December 2003) is an Italian professional footballer who plays as a centre-back for Serie C Group C club Bari.

== Club career ==
Cocetta joined Udinese's academy in 2010. Having come through the club's youth ranks, he helped the under-19 team win direct promotion to Campionato Primavera 1 at the end of the 2021–22 season. In the same campaign, he also received his first call-ups to the first team, under head coach Gabriele Cioffi.

At the start of the 2022–23 season, Cocetta was promoted to Udinese's first team, under manager Andrea Sottil, while also being named as the captain of the under-19 team. On 4 June 2023, he made his professional debut for the club, coming in as a substitute for James Abankwah in the 59th minute of a 1–0 Serie A loss to Juventus.

On 4 August 2023, Cocetta joined Serie C side Turris on a permanent deal, signing a two-year professional contract. On 25 September, he scored his first professional goal in a 3–1 league defeat to Picerno. He collected a total amount of 46 appearances and two goals for the club.

On 7 January 2025, Cocetta joined Serie C club Crotone on a permanent deal, signing a contract until June 2027.

== Career statistics ==
=== Club ===
As of match played 5 January 2025

Appearances and goals by club, season and competition
Club	Season	League	League		National cup (Note: Appearances in the Coppa Italia.)		Continental		Other		Total	
Club	Season	League	Apps	Goals	Apps	Goals	Apps	Goals	Apps	Goals	Apps	Goals
Udinese	2022–23	Serie A	1	0	0	0	0	0	–		1	0
Turris	2023–24	Serie C	27	2	–		–		0	0	27	2
Turris	2024–25	Serie C	16	0	–		–		0	0	16	0
Crotone	2024–25	Serie C	0	0	–		–		0	0	0	0
Career total			44	2	0	0	0	0	0	0	44	2
