= List of Udinese Calcio seasons =

Udinese Calcio is an Italian professional football club based in Udine, Udine province, who play their matches in Stadio Friuli. The club was formed in 1896. The club's formal debut in an official league was in 1912.

The club has never won the Serie A or Serie B or Coppa Italia. They won the Serie C once.

This list details the club's achievements in major competitions, and the top scorers for each season. Records of local or regional competitions are not included due to them being considered of less importance.

== Key ==
- Pld = Matches played
- W = Matches won
- D = Matches drawn
- L = Matches lost
- GF = Goals for
- GA = Goals against
- Pts = Points
- Pos = Final position
- Serie A = 1st tier in Italian league
- Serie B = 2nd tier in Italian league
- Serie C = 3rd tier in Italian league
- Prima Categoria = 1st tier until 1922
- Promozione = 2nd tier until 1922
- Prima Divisione = 1st tier until 1926
- Prima Divisione = 2nd tier (1926–1929)
- Seconda Divisione = 2nd tier until 1926
- Seconda Divisione = 3rd tier (1926–1929)
- Divisione Nazionale = 1st tier (1926–1929)
- RU = Runners-up
- SF = Semi-finals
- QF = Quarter-finals
- R16 = Last 16
- R32 = Last 32
- QR1 = First qualifying round
- QR2 = Second qualifying round
- QR3 = Third qualifying round
- PO = Play-offs
- 1R = Round 1
- 2R = Round 2
- 3R = Round 3
- GS = Group stage
- 2GS = Second group stage
- EC = European Cup (1955–1992)
- UCL = UEFA Champions League (1993–present)
- CWC = UEFA Cup Winners' Cup (1960–1999)
- UC = UEFA Cup (1971–2008)
- UEL = UEFA Europa League (2009–present)
- USC = UEFA Super Cup
- INT = Intercontinental Cup (1960–2004)
- WC = FIFA Club World Cup (2005–present)

| Champions | Runners-up | Promoted | Relegated | 1st tier | 2nd tier | 3rd tier | 4th tier | 5th tier | 6th tier | 7th tier | 8th tier |

== Seasons ==
Results of league and cup competitions by season
| Season | Division | Pld | W | D | L | GF | GA | Pts | Pos | Cup | Supercoppa Italiana | Cup | Result | Player(s) | Goals |
| Season | League | | | | | | | | | Cup | Supercoppa Italiana | UEFA/FIFA | | Top goalscorer(s) | |
|---|---|---|---|---|---|---|---|---|---|---|---|---|---|---|---|
| 2000–01 | Serie A (1) | 34 | 11 | 5 | 18 | 49 | 59 | 38 | 12th | SF | | UC | 2R | Roberto Sosa | 15 |
| 2001–02 | Serie A (1) | 34 | 11 | 7 | 16 | 41 | 52 | 40 | 14th | QF | | | | Roberto Muzzi | 15 |
| 2002–03 | Serie A (1) | 34 | 16 | 8 | 10 | 38 | 35 | 56 | 6th | 2R | | | | Vincenzo Iaquinta; David Pizarro | 8 |
| 2003–04 | Serie A (1) | 34 | 13 | 11 | 10 | 44 | 40 | 50 | 7th | QF | | UC | 1R | Dino Fava | 14 |
| 2004–05 | Serie A (1) | 38 | 17 | 11 | 10 | 56 | 40 | 62 | 4th | SF | | UC | 1R | David Di Michele | 21 |
| 2005–06 | Serie A (1) | 38 | 11 | 10 | 17 | 40 | 54 | 43 | 11th | SF | | UCL; UC | GS; R16 | Vincenzo Iaquinta | 16 |
| 2006–07 | Serie A (1) | 38 | 12 | 10 | 16 | 49 | 55 | 46 | 10th | 3R | | | | Antonio Di Natale; Vincenzo Iaquinta | 14 |
| 2007–08 | Serie A (1) | 38 | 16 | 9 | 13 | 48 | 53 | 57 | 7th | QF | | | | Antonio Di Natale | 18 |
| 2008–09 | Serie A (1) | 38 | 16 | 10 | 12 | 61 | 50 | 58 | 7th | QF | | UC | QF | Fabio Quagliarella | 21 |
| 2009–10 | Serie A (1) | 38 | 11 | 11 | 16 | 54 | 59 | 44 | 15th | SF | | | | Antonio Di Natale | 29 |
| 2010–11 | Serie A (1) | 38 | 20 | 6 | 12 | 65 | 43 | 66 | 4th | R16 | | | | Antonio Di Natale | 28 |
| 2011–12 | Serie A (1) | 38 | 18 | 10 | 10 | 52 | 35 | 64 | 3rd | R16 | | UCL; UEL | PO; R16 | Antonio Di Natale | 29 |
| 2012–13 | Serie A (1) | 38 | 18 | 12 | 8 | 59 | 45 | 62 | 5th | R16 | | UCL; UEL | PO; GS | Antonio Di Natale | 26 |
| 2013–14 | Serie A (1) | 38 | 12 | 8 | 18 | 46 | 57 | 44 | 13th | SF | | UEL | PO | Antonio Di Natale | 20 |
| 2014–15 | Serie A (1) | 38 | 10 | 11 | 17 | 43 | 56 | 41 | 16th | R16 | | | | Antonio Di Natale | 12 |
| 2015–16 | Serie A (1) | 38 | 10 | 9 | 19 | 35 | 60 | 39 | 17th | QF | | | | Cyril Théréau | 12 |
| 2016–17 | Serie A (1) | 38 | 12 | 9 | 17 | 47 | 56 | 45 | 13th | 3R | | | | Cyril Théréau | 12 |
| 2017–18 | Serie A (1) | 38 | 12 | 4 | 22 | 48 | 63 | 40 | 14th | R16 | | | | Kevin Lasagna | 14 |
| 2018–19 | Serie A (1) | 38 | 11 | 10 | 17 | 39 | 53 | 43 | 12th | 3R | | | | Rodrigo De Paul | 9 |
| 2019–20 | Serie A (1) | 38 | 12 | 9 | 17 | 37 | 51 | 45 | 13th | R16 | | | | Kevin Lasagna | 12 |
| 2020–21 | Serie A (1) | 38 | 10 | 10 | 18 | 42 | 58 | 40 | 14th | 4R | | | | Rodrigo De Paul | 9 |
| 2021–22 | Serie A (1) | 38 | 11 | 14 | 13 | 61 | 58 | 47 | 12th | R16 | | | | Gerard Deulofeu | 13 |
| 2022–23 | Serie A (1) | 38 | 11 | 13 | 14 | 47 | 48 | 46 | 12th | R32 | | | | Beto | 10 |
| 2023–24 | Serie A (1) | 38 | 6 | 19 | 13 | 37 | 53 | 37 | 15th | R32 | | | | Lorenzo Lucca | 9 |
| 2024–25 | Serie A (1) | 38 | 12 | 8 | 18 | 41 | 56 | 44 | 12th | R16 | | | | Lorenzo Lucca | 12 |
