= 2023 Djurgårdens IF season =

Djurgarden 2023 season

Djurgårdens IF Fotboll
2023 season
- Chairman: Lars-Erik Sjöberg
- Head coach(es): Kim Bergstrand & Thomas Lagerlöf
- Stadium: Tele2 Arena
- Allsvenskan: 4th
- 2022–23 Svenska Cupen: Semi-final
- 2023–24 Svenska Cupen: Runners Up
- 2022–23 UEFA Europa Conference League: Round of 16
- 2023–24 UEFA Europa Conference League: 2nd Qualifying Round
- Top goalscorer: League: Marcus Danielson; Hampus Finndell (5); All: Marcus Danielson; Hampus Finndell (6)
- Highest home attendance: 26,207 v Malmö; 17 July 2023
- Lowest home attendance: 8,762 v Landskrona; 20 February 2023
- Average home league attendance: 19,331
- Biggest win: 6–1 v Landskrona; 20 February 2023
- Biggest defeat: 0–4 v Elfsborg; 22 July 2023
Home colours	Away colours	Third colours
- All statistics correct as of 12 November 2023.

The 2023 season was Djurgårdens IF's 123rd in existence, their 68th season in Allsvenskan and their 23rd consecutive season in the league. In addition to the Allsvenskan, they competed in the 2022–23 and 2023–24 editions of the Svenska Cupen, continued the 2022–23 UEFA Europa Conference League at the Round of 16, and entered the 2023–24 UEFA Europa Conference League at the 2nd Qualifying Round.

== Squad ==
=== Season squad ===
Squad No.	Name	Nationality	Position	Date of birth (age)	Previous club	Apps	Goals
Goalkeepers
30	Tommi Vaiho	(Sweden)	GK	13 September 1988 (age 38)	(Sweden) GAIS	87	0
35	Jacob Widell Zetterström	(Sweden)	GK	11 July 1998 (age 28)	(Sweden) IFK Lidingö	92	0
40	André Picornell	(Sweden)	GK	3 April 2004 (age 22)	(Sweden) IF Brommapojkarna	2	0
Defenders
2	Piotr Johansson	(Sweden)	DF	28 February 1995 (age 31)	(Sweden) Kalmar FF	85	3
3	Marcus Danielson	(Sweden)	DF	8 April 1989 (age 37)	(China) Dalian Professional	126	17
5	Elliot Käck	(Sweden)	DF	18 September 1989 (age 37)	(Norway) IK Start	187	2
12	Theo Bergvall	(Sweden)	DF	21 September 2004 (age 22)	(Sweden) IF Brommapojkarna	3	0
16	Rami Kaib	(Tunisia)	DF	8 May 1997 (age 29)	(Netherlands) SC Heerenveen	7	0
17	Carlos Moros Gracia	(Spain)	DF	15 April 1993 (age 33)	(Sweden) Mjällby	13	0
19	Pierre Bengtsson	(Sweden)	DF	12 April 1988 (age 38)	(Denmark) F.C. Copenhagen	40	0
26	Samuel Dahl	(Sweden)	DF	4 March 2003 (age 23)	(Sweden) Örebro	15	0
27	Jacob Une Larsson	(Sweden)	DF	8 April 1994 (age 32)	(Sweden) IF Brommapojkarna	194	13
Midfielders
6	Rasmus Schüller	(Finland)	MF	18 June 1991 (age 35)	(Finland) HJK Helsinki	99	3
7	Magnus Eriksson (C)	(Sweden)	MF	8 April 1990 (age 36)	(United States) San Jose Earthquakes	185	32
9	Haris Radetinac	(Bosnia and Herzegovina)	MF	28 October 1985 (age 41)	(Sweden) Mjällby AIF	279	31
13	Hampus Finndell	(Sweden)	MF	6 June 2000 (age 26)	(Netherlands) FC Groningen	115	16
14	Besard Šabović	(Sweden)	MF	5 January 1998 (age 28)	(Russia) FC Khimki	64	6
20	Isak Alemayehu	(Sweden)	MF	11 October 2006 (age 20)	(Sweden) Djurgården Youth	2	0
21	Lucas Bergvall	(Sweden)	MF	2 February 2006 (age 20)	(Sweden) IF Brommapojkarna	29	3
23	Gustav Wikheim	(Norway)	MF	18 March 1993 (age 33)	(Saudi Arabia) Al Fateh	72	14
Forwards
15	Oskar Fallenius	(Sweden)	FW	1 November 2001 (age 25)	(Denmark) Brøndby	29	2
18	Felix Vá	(Angola)	FW	24 April 1998 (age 28)	(Cyprus) Apollon Limassol	12	2
22	Musa Qurbanlı	(Azerbaijan)	FW	13 April 2002 (age 24)	(Azerbaijan) Qarabağ	17	3
29	Noel Milleskog	(Sweden)	FW	8 May 2002 (age 24)	(Sweden) Örebro	13	3
33	Kalipha Jawla	(Sweden)	FW	11 April 2006 (age 20)	(Sweden) Djurgården Youth	1	0
Away on loan
	Jesper Löfgren	(Sweden)	DF	3 May 1997 (age 29)	(Norway) SK Brann	82	3
	Frank Odhiambo	(Kenya)	DF	29 October 2002 (age 24)	(Kenya) Gor Mahia	0	0
	Axel Wallenborg	(Sweden)	DF	17 December 2000 (age 25)	(Sweden) IF Brommapojkarna	0	0

Last updated: 4 November 2023.
Source: []

== Transfers ==
=== Loans in ===
Date from	Position	Nationality	Name	From	Date until	Ref.

=== Loans out ===
Date from	Position	Nationality	Name	To	Date until	Ref.
25 January 2022	DF	(Sweden)	Jacob Une Larsson	(Greece) Panetolikos	1 July 2023	
11 January 2023	MF	(Albania)	Albion Ademi	(Sweden) Värnamo	7 November 2023	
31 January 2023	DF	(Sweden)	Axel Wallenborg	(Denmark) AB	1 July 2023	
31 March 2023	DF	(Kenya)	Frank Odhiambo	(Sweden) Vasalund	31 December 2023	
20 July 2023	DF	(Sweden)	Axel Wallenborg	(Sweden) Karlstad	31 December 2023	
31 August 2023	DF	(Sweden)	Jesper Löfgren	(Sweden) Brommapojkarna	31 December 2023	

=== Transfers in ===
Date from	Position	Nationality	Name	From	Fee	Ref.
27 February 2023	FW	(Sweden)	Oskar Fallenius	(Denmark) Brøndby IF	Undisclosed	
30 March 2023	DF	(Sweden)	Philip Rolke	(Switzerland) FC Basel	Undisclosed	
30 June 2023	DF	(Tunisia)	Rami Kaib	(Netherlands) SC Heerenveen	Undisclosed	
4 July 2023	FW	(Angola)	Felix Vá	(Cyprus) Apollon Limassol FC	Undisclosed	
5 July 2023	FW	(Azerbaijan)	Musa Qurbanlı	(Azerbaijan) Qarabağ FK	Undisclosed	
14 July 2023	FW	(Sweden)	Noel Milleskog	(Sweden) Örebro SK	Undisclosed	
24 July 2023	DF	(Sweden)	Samuel Dahl	(Sweden) Örebro SK	Undisclosed	
28 November 2023	MF	(Sweden)	Samuel Leach Holm	(Sweden) IF Brommapojkarna	Undisclosed	
10 December 2023	GK	(Sweden)	Malkolm Nilsson Säfqvist	(Sweden) Halmstads BK	Undisclosed	
21 December 2023	DF	(Finland)	Miro Tenho	(Finland) HJK	Undisclosed	
30 December 2023	MF	(Sweden)	Albin Ekdal	Free agent	Free	

=== Transfers out ===
Date from	Position	Nationality	Name	To	Fee	Ref.
3 January 2023	MF	(Zambia)	Emmanuel Banda	(Croatia) HNK Rijeka	Free	
21 January 2023	DF	(Sweden)	Hjalmar Ekdal	(England) Burnley	Undisclosed	
27 June 2023	FW	(Sweden)	Victor Edvardsen	(Netherlands) Go Ahead Eagles	Undisclosed	
3 July 2023	MF	(Sweden)	Wilmer Odefalk	(Sweden) IF Brommapojkarna	Undisclosed	
14 July 2023	FW	(Sweden)	Jacob Bergström	(Sweden) Mjällby AIF	Undisclosed	
18 July 2023	DF	(Sweden)	Elias Andersson	(Poland) Lech Poznań	Undisclosed	
21 August 2023	FW	(Norway)	Oliver Berg	(Sweden) Malmö	Undisclosed	
24 August 2023	FW	(Sweden)	Joel Asoro	(France) Metz	Undisclosed	
7 November 2023	MF	(Albania)	Albion Ademi	(Sweden) Värnamo	Undisclosed	

=== Released ===
Date from	Position	Nationality	Name	To	Notes	Ref.
12 January 2023	MF	(Guinea)	Amadou Doumbouya	(Bulgaria) Botev Plovdiv	Mutual Consent	
31 December 2023	DF	(Sweden)	Elliot Käck		Mutual Consent	
31 December 2023	GK	(Sweden)	Tommi Vaiho		Mutual Consent	

- Note: Players will join other clubs after being released or terminated from their contract. Only the following clubs are mentioned when that club signed the player in the same transfer window.

== Competitions ==
=== Overview ===
Competition	First match	Last match	Starting round	Final position	Record							
Competition	First match	Last match	Starting round	Final position	Pld	W	D	L	GF	GA	GD	Win %
Allsvenskan	1 April 2023	12 November 2023	Matchday 1	4th	30	15	5	10	41	36	+5	50.00
Svenska Cupen 2022/23	1 September 2022	19 March 2023	Round 2	Semi-final	5	3	1	1	12	8	+4	60.00
Svenska Cupen 2023/24	23 August 2023	1 May 2024	Round 2	Runners Up	1	1	0	0	5	1	+4	100.00
Europa Conference League 2022/23	21 July 2022	16 March 2023	2nd Qualifying Round	Round of 16	2	0	0	2	0	5	−5	0.00
Europa Conference League 2023/24	27 July 2023	3 August 2023	2nd Qualifying Round	2nd Qualifying Round	2	0	1	1	2	3	−1	0.00
Total					40	19	7	14	60	53	+7	47.50

Last updated: 1 May 2024
Source: Soccerway

=== Club Friendlies ===
21 January 2023 Friendly	(Sweden) Brommapojkarna	1–1	Djurgården (Sweden)	Vällingby
14:00 CET	Gracia 28' (o.g.)	Report	Asoro 65' (pen.)	Stadium: Grimsta IP; Referee: (Sweden) Mohammed Al-Hakim

28 January 2023 Friendly	(Sweden) Eskilstuna	1–5	Djurgården (Sweden)	Eskilstuna
14:00 CET	Palomino 13'; Yakubu (red card) 55'	Report	Löfgren 8'; Edvardsen 55' (pen.); Bergström 74' 81'; Odefalk 78'	Stadium: Tunavallen; Referee: (Sweden) Jasmin Svraka

7 February 2023 Friendly	(Spain) Las Palmas	1–3	Djurgården (Sweden)	Las Palmas
12:00 CET	Mandiang 46'	Report	Odefalk 19'; Wikheim 21'; Edvardsen 87'	Stadium: Ciudad Deportiva UD Las Palmas

11 February 2023 Friendly	(Sweden) Sirius	0–1	Djurgården (Sweden)	Uppsala
13:00 CET		Report	Berg 35' (pen.)	Stadium: Studenternas IP; Referee: (Sweden) Jovan Krsmanovic

14 February 2023 Friendly	(Sweden) Djurgården	1–4	Värnamo (Sweden)	Stockholm
14:00 CET	Gracia 64'	Report	Zeljkovic 6'; Unknown 28' (o.g.); Grozdanic 72'; Dickman 89'	Stadium: Tele2 Arena; Referee: (Sweden) Erik Mattsson

24 March 2023 Friendly	(Sweden) Gefle	0–0	Djurgården (Sweden)	Gävle
13:00 CET				Stadium: Gavlevallen

26 June 2023 Friendly	(Sweden) Häcken	0–1	Djurgården (Sweden)	Gothenburg
15:00 CET		Report	Berg 61'	Stadium: Bravida Arena; Referee: (Sweden) Granit Maqedonci

=== Allsvenskan ===
==== League table ====
Pos	Team	Pld	W	D	L	GF	GA	GD	Pts	Qualification or relegation
2	IF Elfsborg	30	20	4	6	59	26	+33	64	Qualification for the Europa League first qualifying round (Note: The 2023–24 Svenska Cupen winners qualified for the Europa League first qualifying round. Since the cup winners (Malmö FF) qualified based on league position, the Europa League spot was passed to the second-placed team, and the second Conference League second qualifying round spot was passed to the fourth-placed team.)
3	BK Häcken	30	18	3	9	69	39	+30	57	Qualification for the Conference League second qualifying round
4	Djurgårdens IF	30	15	5	10	41	36	+5	50	Qualification for the Conference League second qualifying round
5	IFK Värnamo	30	14	3	13	37	34	+3	45	
6	Kalmar FF	30	13	6	11	35	40	−5	45	

Source: svenskfotboll.se (in Swedish)
Rules for classification: 1) Points; 2) Goal difference; 3) Goals scored; 4) Head-to-head points; 5) Head-to-head goal difference; 6) Play-off
(Note: Play-off is only played if need to decide champion, teams for relegation or UEFA competition and will be played on a neutral ground).

==== Results summary ====
Overall								Home						Away					
Pld	W	D	L	GF	GA	GD	Pts	W	D	L	GF	GA	GD	W	D	L	GF	GA	GD
30	15	5	10	41	36	+5	50	10	2	3	25	15	+10	5	3	7	16	21	−5

Source: soccerway

==== Results by round ====
Round	1	2	3	4	5	6	7	8	9	10	11	12	13	14	15	16	17	18	19	20	21	22	23	24	25	26	27	28	29	30
Ground	H	A	A	H	A	A	H	A	H	H	H	A	H	H	A	H	H	A	A	A	H	A	H	A	H	A	H	A	H	A
Result	W	D	L	W	L	L	W	L	W	W	W	D	D	W	W	W	L	W	L	D	W	W	L	L	W	W	D	W	L	L
Position	1	4	8	7	6	8	6	8	5	4	4	5	4	4	4	4	4	4	4	5	4	4	4	4	4	4	4	4	4	4
Points	3	4	4	7	7	7	10	10	13	16	19	20	21	24	27	30	30	33	33	34	37	40	40	40	43	46	47	50	50	50

Updated to match(es) played on 12 November 2023. Source:
A = Away; H = Home; W = Win; D = Draw; L = Loss

==== Matches ====
===== April =====
1 April 2023 Match 1	Djurgården	3–1	Brommapojkarna	Stockholm
17:30 CEST	Finndell 16' 51' (yellow card) 56'; Wikheim 43'; Schüller (yellow card) 73'	Report	Magnusson (yellow card) 31'; Cosic 60'	Stadium: Tele2 Arena; Attendance: 22,273; Referee: (Sweden) Andreas Ekberg

9 April 2023 Match 2	Sirius	0–0	Djurgården	Uppsala
17:30 CEST	Stensson (yellow card) 71'; Widgren (yellow card) 79'	Report	Schüller (yellow card) 32'; Zetterström (red card) 51'	Stadium: Studenternas IP; Attendance: 9,813; Referee: (Sweden) Joakim Östling

16 April 2023 Match 3	Halmstad	2–0	Djurgården	Halmstad
17:30 CEST	Wallentin 18'; Svedberg (yellow card) 67'; Ahlstrand 70'; Allansson (yellow card) 80'	Report	Andersson (yellow card) 82'; Schüller (yellow card) 90'	Stadium: Örjans Vall; Attendance: 7,247; Referee: (Sweden) Victor Wolf

23 April 2023 Match 4	Djurgården	1–0	Göteborg	Stockholm
15:00 CEST	Finndell 6'	Report	S Eriksson (yellow card) 28'; Carlén (yellow card) 37'; Hausner (yellow card) 58'; Trondsen (red card) 90+8'	Stadium: Tele2 Arena; Attendance: 22,529; Referee: (Sweden) Mohammed Al-Hakim

30 April 2023 Match 5	Degerfors	2–1	Djurgården	Degerfors
17:30 CEST	Vukojević 25'; Wallin (yellow card) 44'; Örqvist 77'; Gyau (yellow card) 90+2'	Report	Edvardsen (yellow card) 5'; Šabović 41'; Johansson (yellow card) 81'	Stadium: Stora Valla; Attendance: 5,050; Referee: (Sweden) Granit Maqedonci

===== May =====
3 May 2023 Match 6	Häcken	4–1	Djurgården	Gothenburg
19:00 CEST	Larsen 53' 85'; Hovland 67' 83'	Report	Asoro 45+1'	Stadium: Bravida Arena; Attendance: 5,116; Referee: (Sweden) Glenn Nyberg

8 May 2023 Match 7	Djurgården	3–1	Kalmar	Stockholm
19:10 CEST	Finndell (yellow card) 19'; Asoro 23'; Ólafsson 40' (o.g.); Wikheim 53'	Report	Sjöstedt (yellow card) 52'; Hümmet 66'; Girmai (yellow card) 80'; Motaraghebjafarpour (yellow card) 86'	Stadium: Tele2 Arena; Attendance: 15,343; Referee: (Sweden) Fredrik Klitte

14 May 2023 Match 8	Hammarby	4–3	Djurgården	Stockholm
15:00 CEST	Tekie (yellow card) 24'; Besara 34' (pen.) 84' (pen.) (yellow card) 84'; Adjei 45+4'; Mikkelsen 56'; Strand (yellow card) 59'; Hammar (yellow card) 79'; Pinas (yellow card) 79'; Dovin (yellow card) 90+2'	Report	Kurtulus 49' (o.g.); Radetinac 63' (yellow card) 79'; Danielson 88' (pen.)	Stadium: Tele2 Arena; Attendance: 26,442; Referee: (Sweden) Mohammed Al-Hakim

20 May 2023 Match 9	Djurgården	2–0	Mjällby	Stockholm
17:30 CEST	Eriksson 48'; Danielson (yellow card) 77'; Šabović (yellow card) 84'; Fallenius (yellow card) 87'; Edvardsen 90+2'	Report		Stadium: Tele2 Arena; Attendance: 15,702; Referee: (Sweden) Kaspar Sjöberg

24 May 2023 Match 10	Djurgården	1–0	Häcken	Stockholm
19:00 CEST	Berg 72' (pen.); Löfgren (yellow card) 81'; Zetterström (yellow card) 90+6'	Report	Romeo (yellow card) 48'; Friðriksson (yellow card) 70'; Lund (yellow card) 88'	Stadium: Tele2 Arena; Attendance: 15,168; Referee: (Sweden) Joakim Östling

28 May 2023 Match 11	Djurgården	1–0	AIK	Stockholm
15:00 CEST	Schüller (yellow card) 35'; Danielson 82'; Radetinac (yellow card) 90+2'	Report	Björnström (red card) 90'; Otieno (red card) 90+2'	Stadium: Tele2 Arena; Attendance: 26,084; Referee: (Sweden) Andreas Ekberg

===== June =====
4 June 2023 Match 12	Elfsborg	1–1	Djurgården	Borås
17:30 CEST	Qasem (yellow card) 24'; Larsson 46'; Holmén (yellow card) 82'	Report	Schüller (yellow card) 69'; Edvardsen 73'; Šabović (yellow card) 90'	Stadium: Borås Arena; Attendance: 12,664; Referee: (Sweden) Kristoffer Karlsson

11 June 2023 Match 13	Djurgården	2–2	Norrköping	Stockholm
17:30 CEST	Guðjohnsen 39' (o.g.); Danielson 48'	Report	Lund (yellow card) 21' (goal) 27'; Lind 34'; Eriksson (yellow card) 64'	Stadium: Tele2 Arena; Attendance: 21,209; Referee: (Sweden) Granit Maqedonci

===== July =====
2 July 2023 Match 14	Djurgården	2–0	Varberg	Stockholm
17:30 CEST	Löfgren 4'; Finndell (yellow card) 28'; Berg 60' (pen.)	Report	Krasniqi (yellow card) 59'; El Ouatki (yellow card) 85'	Stadium: Tele2 Arena; Attendance: 15,531; Referee: (Sweden) Adam Ladebäck

8 July 2023 Match 15	Värnamo	1–2	Djurgården	Värnamo
15:00 CEST	Engvall 7'; Lohikangas (yellow card) 39'	Report	Löfgren (yellow card) 50'; Schüller 69'; Berg 77' (pen.); Asoro (yellow card) 90+5'	Stadium: Finnvedsvallen; Attendance: 3,904; Referee: (Sweden) Magnus Lindgren

17 July 2023 Match 16	Djurgården	2–0	Malmö	Stockholm
19:00 CEST	Fallenius 10'; Andersson (yellow card) 18'; Šabović (yellow card) 78'; Radetinac 81'	Report	Rosengren (yellow card) 81'; Nielsen (yellow card) 85'	Stadium: Tele2 Arena; Attendance: 26,207; Referee: (Sweden) Mohammed Al-Hakim

22 July 2023 Match 17	Djurgården	0–4	Elfsborg	Stockholm
15:00 CEST	Radetinac (yellow card) 40'; Schüller (yellow card) 56'	Report	Bernhardsson 3'; Okkels 21' (pen.) 42' (yellow card) 81'; Frick (yellow card) 24'; Hult (yellow card) 45+1'; Rømer (yellow card) 64'; Guðjohnsen 66'	Stadium: Tele2 Arena; Attendance: 19,510; Referee: (Sweden) Fredrik Klitte

30 July 2023 Match 18	Mjällby	0–1	Djurgården	Hällevik
15:00 CEST	Jagne (yellow card) 48'	Report	Asoro 22'	Stadium: Strandvallen; Attendance: 5,974; Referee: (Sweden) Adam Ladebäck

===== August =====
13 August 2023 Match 19	Göteborg	2–1	Djurgården	Gothenburg
15:00 CEST	S Eriksson (yellow card) 43'; Carlén (yellow card) 51'; Muçolli 77'; Berg 86'	Report	Milleskog 20'; Danielson (yellow card) 57'	Stadium: Gamla Ullevi; Attendance: 16,729; Referee: (Sweden) Andreas Ekberg

20 August 2023 Match 20	Malmö	0–0	Djurgården	Malmö
15:00 CEST	Busanello (yellow card) 38'; Rieks (yellow card) 81'; Nielsen (yellow card) 83'	Report	Finndell (yellow card) 40'; Eriksson (yellow card) 67'; Johansson (yellow card) 71'	Stadium: Eleda Stadion; Attendance: 20,772; Referee: (Sweden) Victor Wolf

27 August 2023 Match 21	Djurgården	4–1	Degerfors	Stockholm
17:30 CEST	Wikheim 2'; Qurbanlı 23' 34' (penalty missed) 58; Danielson 64'	Report	Gyau 20'	Stadium: Tele2 Arena; Attendance: 17,101; Referee: (Sweden) Fredrik Klitte

===== September =====
3 September 2023 Match 22	Norrköping	0–2	Djurgården	Norrköping
17:30 CEST	Ceesay (yellow card) 43'; Eriksson (yellow card) 59'	Report	Nyman 63' (o.g.); Radetinac 76'	Stadium: PlatinumCars Arena; Attendance: 13,115; Referee: (Sweden) Granit Maqedonci

16 September 2023 Match 23	Djurgården	1–2	Värnamo	Stockholm
17:30 CEST	Finndell 46' (yellow card) 85'; Fallenius (yellow card) 48'; Schüller (yellow card) 88'; Moros Gracia (yellow card) 90+4'	Report	Zeljkovic 5' 69'; Thern (yellow card) 88'; Rasheed (yellow card) 90+2'	Stadium: Tele2 Arena; Attendance: 15,685; Referee: (Sweden) Adi Aganovic

24 September 2023 Match 24	AIK	2–0	Djurgården	Stockholm
15:00 CEST	Pittas 52' 90' (yellow card) 90+1'; Nordfeldt (yellow card) 78'	Report	Schüller (yellow card) 70'; Moros Gracia (yellow card) 73'; Eriksson (yellow card) 81'; Šabović (yellow card) 82'	Stadium: Friends Arena; Attendance: 41,327; Referee: (Sweden) Fredrik Klitte

30 September 2023 Match 25	Djurgården	1–0	Halmstad	Stockholm
15:00 CEST	Finndell (yellow card) 53'; L Bergvall 82'; Dahl (yellow card) 87'	Report	Wallentin (yellow card) 81'	Stadium: Tele2 Arena; Attendance: 15,404; Referee: (Sweden) Mohammed Al-Hakim

===== October =====
8 October 2023 Match 26	Varberg	0–1	Djurgården	Varberg
17:30 CEST		Report	Dahl (yellow card) 14'; Vá 46'; Milleskog (yellow card) 89'; Johansson (yellow card) 90+5'	Stadium: Varberg Energi Arena; Attendance: 1,872; Referee: (Sweden) Adi Aganovic

21 October 2023 Match 27	Djurgården	0–0	Hammarby	Stockholm
15:00 CEST	L Bergvall (yellow card) 32'	Report	Hammar (yellow card) 43'; Karlsson (yellow card) 63'; Strand (yellow card) 90+13'	Stadium: Tele2 Arena; Attendance: 24,564; Referee: (Sweden) Mohammed Al-Hakim

28 October 2023 Match 28	Brommapojkarna	1–2	Djurgården	Vällingby
15:00 CEST	Heggem (yellow card) 40'; Vasić 79'	Report	Schüller (yellow card) 13'; L Bergvall 33'; Fallenius 58'	Stadium: Grimsta IP; Attendance: 3,900; Referee: (Sweden) Adam Ladebäck

===== November =====
5 November 2023 Match 29	Djurgården	2–4	Sirius	Stockholm
17:30 CET	Vá 22'; Danielson 61' (pen.); L Bergvall (yellow card) 74'	Report	Stensson (yellow card) 23'; De Kamps (yellow card) 40'; Joakim Persson 41' 48' 67' (yellow card) 67'; Abou Ali 52'; Castegren (yellow card) 59'	Stadium: Tele2 Arena; Attendance: 17,654; Referee: (Sweden) Fredrik Klitte

12 November 2023 Match 30	Kalmar	2–1	Djurgården	Kalmar
15:00 CET	Hümmet (yellow card) 24'; Skrabb 58' 75'; Sætra (yellow card) 66'	Report	Finndell (yellow card) 45+1' (goal) 90+5'	Stadium: Guldfågeln Arena; Attendance: 6,575; Referee: (Sweden) Joakim Östling

=== 2022–23 Svenska Cupen ===
==== Matches ====
===== Group stage =====
Pos	Team	Pld	W	D	L	GF	GA	GD	Pts	Qualification	DIF	ÖRE	LAN	IBP
1	Djurgårdens IF	3	3	0	0	10	3	+7	9	Advance to Knockout Stage			6–1	2–1
2	Örebro SK	3	2	0	1	5	3	+2	6		1–2			
3	Landskrona BoIS	3	1	0	2	4	10	−6	3			0–2		
4	IF Brommapojkarna	3	0	0	3	4	7	−3	0			1–2	2–3	

Updated to match(es) played on 4 March 2023. Source: Swedish Football Association
Rules for classification: 1) Points; 2) Goal difference; 3) Goals scored; 4) Head-to-head record; 5) Highest ranked team

20 February 2023 Match 1	Djurgården	6–1	Landskrona BoIS	Stockholm
18:30 CET	Wikheim 12'; Andersson 27'; Asoro 45+2'; Berg 49'; Šabović 79'; L Bergvall 90+2'	Report	Edvardsson (yellow card) 22'; Diawara (yellow card) 41' (goal) 86'; Dahlqvist (yellow card) 89'; Tkacz (yellow card) 89'	Stadium: Tele2 Arena; Attendance: 8,762; Referee: (Sweden) Adam Ladebäck

26 February 2023 Match 2	Örebro SK	1–2	Djurgården	Örebro
17:30 CET	Milleskog 53'	Report	Wikheim 7'; Johansson 90+1'	Stadium: Behrn Arena; Attendance: 3,604; Referee: (Sweden) Mohammed Al-Hakim

4 March 2023 Match 3	Djurgården	2–1	IF Brommapojkarna	Stockholm
13:00 CET	Eriksson 39' 44'; Johansson (yellow card) 54'; Edvardsen (yellow card) 72'	Report	Vasic 37'; Sandberg Magnusson (yellow card) 44'; Fritzson (yellow card) 44'	Stadium: Tele2 Arena; Attendance: 10,174; Referee: (Sweden) Joakim Östling

===== Quarter-final =====
12 March 2023 Quarter-final	Djurgården	2–2 (a.e.t.) (5–3 p)	Malmö FF	Stockholm
16:00 CET	Asoro (yellow card) 84'; Edvardsen (yellow card) 84'; Andersson 86'; Finndell (yellow card) 98' (goal) 120'; Šabović (yellow card) 107'; Löfgren (yellow card) 109'	Report	Christiansen 10' (penalty missed) 26 114'; Busanello (yellow card) 60'; Dahlin (yellow card) 78'; Tinnerholm (yellow card) 84'; Thelin (yellow card) 107'	Stadium: Tele2 Arena; Attendance: 13,752; Referee: (Sweden) Adam Ladebäck
	Penalties
	Danielson (penalty scored); Berg (penalty scored); Asoro (penalty scored); Löfgren (penalty scored); Šabović (penalty scored)		Thelin (penalty missed); Nielsen (penalty scored); Christiansen (penalty scored); Olsson (penalty scored)

===== Semi-final =====
19 March 2023 Semi-final	BK Häcken	3–0	Djurgården	Gothenburg
15:00 CET	Gustafson (yellow card) 26'; Larsen 34'; Sadiq 36' 57'; Abrahamsson (yellow card) 42'	Report	Wikheim (yellow card) 41'	Stadium: Bravida Arena; Attendance: 4,168; Referee: (Sweden) Glenn Nyberg

=== 2023–24 Svenska Cupen ===
Djurgården were drawn away at Sandvikens IF in the 2nd round of the 2023-24 Svenska Cupen on 4 July 2023.

==== Qualification ====
23 August 2023 Round 2	Sandvikens IF	1–5	Djurgården	Sandviken
19:00 CEST	Igbarumah 31'; Pacha (yellow card) 62'; Kouyaté (yellow card) 67'	Report	Milleskog 10' 66'; Qurbanlı 12'; Danielson 45' (pen.); Radetinac 90'	Stadium: Jernvallen; Attendance: 2,583; Referee: (Sweden) Jasmin Svraka

=== 2022–23 Europa Conference League ===
==== Round of 16 ====
Djurgården finished top of Group F and qualified for the round of 16. The draw to decide their opponents was made on 24 February 2023, where they were drawn against Lech Poznań of Poland.

===== Matches =====
9 March 2023 Round of 16 1st leg	Lech Poznań (Poland)	2–0	(Sweden) Djurgården	Poznań
21:00 CEST	Milić 39'; Murawski (yellow card) 60'; Ishak (yellow card) 67'; Marchwiński 82'	Report	Gracia (yellow card) 49'	Stadium: Stadion Poznań; Attendance: 40,222; Referee: Stéphanie Frappart (France)

16 March 2023 Round of 16 2nd leg	Djurgården (Sweden)	0–3	(Poland) Lech Poznań	Stockholm
18:45 CEST	Radetinac (yellow card) 9'; Danielson (red card) 44'; Andersson (yellow card) 73'; Šabović (yellow card) 87'	Report	Karlström (yellow card) 42'; Murawski (yellow card) 54'; Sousa (yellow card) 63'; Salamon (yellow card) 73'; Szymczak (yellow card) 73'; Marchwiński 77'; Sobiech (yellow card) 83'; Kvekveskiri 90+1'; Skóraś 90+2'	Stadium: Tele2 Arena; Attendance: 25,115; Referee: Duje Strukan (Croatia)

Djurgården lost 5-0 on aggregate.

=== 2023–24 Europa Conference League ===
==== Qualifying ====
Djurgården entered the 2023–24 Europa Conference League at the 2nd Qualifying Round after finishing 2nd in the 2022 Allsvenskan. Djurgården were drawn against Luzern of Switzerland, with the 1st leg at home. The draw was made on 21 June 2023, with the matches being played on 27 July 2023 and 3 August 2023.

The draw for the 3rd Qualifying Round was made on 24 July 2023, which drew the winners of the tie against Hibernian of Scotland or Inter Club d'Escaldes of Andorra, with the first leg away from home.

Both draws were made at the UEFA headquarters in Nyon, Switzerland.

===== Matches =====
27 July 2023 2nd Qualifying Round 1st leg	Djurgården (Sweden)	1–2	(Switzerland) Luzern	Stockholm
19:00 CEST	Löfgren 5'; Schüller (yellow card) 59'	Report	Beloko (yellow card) 8'; Okou (yellow card) 13'; Ademi 29'; Kadák 82'; Frýdek (yellow card) 90+5'	Stadium: Tele2 Arena; Attendance: 17,921; Referee: Sander van der Eijk (Netherlands)

3 August 2023 2nd Qualifying Round 2nd leg	Luzern (Switzerland)	1–1	(Sweden) Djurgården	Lucerne
20:45 CEST	Burch 27' (yellow card) 45+4'; Frýdek (yellow card) 31'; Kadák (yellow card) 35'; Ademi (yellow card) 42'; Beka (yellow card) 44'	Report	Schüller (yellow card) 42'; Wikheim (yellow card) 45+4'; Asoro 45+6'	Stadium: Swissporarena; Attendance: 13,374; Referee: Genc Nuza (Kosovo)

Djurgården lost 3-2 on aggregate.

== Statistics ==
=== Appearances ===
Last updated: 12 November 2023.

No.	Pos.	Name	Allsvenskan		Svenska Cupen 2022/23		Svenska Cupen 2023/24		Europa Conference League 2022/23		Europa Conference League 2023/24		Total	
No.	Pos.	Name	Apps	Goals	Apps	Goals	Apps	Goals	Apps	Goals	Apps	Goals	Apps	Goals
Goalkeepers
30	GK	(Sweden) Tommi Vaiho	6+1	0	0	0	1	0	0	0	0	0	7+1	0
35	GK	(Sweden) Jacob Widell Zetterström	23	0	5	0	0	0	2	0	2	0	32	0
40	GK	(Sweden) André Picornell	1+1	0	0	0	0	0	0	0	0	0	1+1	0
Defenders
2	DF	(Sweden) Piotr Johansson	30	0	5	1	0	0	2	0	2	0	39	1
3	DF	(Sweden) Marcus Danielson	29	5	5	0	1	1	2	0	1	0	38	6
4	DF	(Sweden) Jesper Löfgren	15+2	1	2+2	0	1	0	1+1	0	1	1	20+5	2
12	DF	(Sweden) Theo Bergvall	0+2	0	0	0	0+1	0	0	0	0	0	0+3	0
16	DF	(Tunisia) Rami Kaib	1+4	0	0	0	1	0	0	0	1	0	3+4	0
17	DF	(Spain) Carlos Moros Gracia	4+4	0	3	0	0	0	1+1	0	0	0	8+5	0
19	DF	(Sweden) Pierre Bengtsson	0+4	0	1+2	0	0	0	1+1	0	0	0	2+7	0
26	DF	(Sweden) Samuel Dahl	13	0	0	0	0	0	0	0	1+1	0	14+1	0
27	DF	(Sweden) Jacob Une Larsson	11+3	0	0	0	1	0	0	0	2	0	14+3	0
Midfielders
6	MF	(Finland) Rasmus Schüller	23	1	5	0	0+1	0	1	0	2	0	31+1	1
7	MF	(Sweden) Magnus Eriksson	22+7	1	5	2	1	0	2	0	1+1	0	31+8	3
9	MF	(Bosnia and Herzegovina) Haris Radetinac	16+8	3	1+3	0	0+1	1	1+1	0	1+1	0	19+14	4
13	MF	(Sweden) Hampus Finndell	20+4	5	2+3	1	1	0	1+1	0	2	0	26+8	6
14	MF	(Sweden) Besard Šabović	7+18	1	1+4	1	1	0	1+1	0	0	0	10+23	2
20	MF	(Sweden) Isak Alemayehu	0	0	0	0	0	0	0+1	0	0	0	0+1	0
21	MF	(Sweden) Lucas Bergvall	11+14	2	1+2	1	0	0	0	0	0+1	0	12+17	3
23	MF	(Norway) Gustav Wikheim	19+3	3	5	2	0+1	0	2	0	1+1	0	27+5	5
Forwards
15	FW	(Sweden) Oskar Fallenius	14+12	2	0+1	0	0	0	0	0	2	0	16+13	2
18	FW	(Angola) Felix Vá	2+9	2	0	0	1	0	0	0	0	0	3+9	2
22	FW	(Azerbaijan) Musa Qurbanlı	10+4	2	0	0	1	1	0	0	1+1	0	12+5	3
29	FW	(Sweden) Noel Milleskog	2+9	1	0	0	1	2	0	0	0+1	0	3+10	3
33	FW	(Sweden) Kalipha Jawla	0	0	0	0	0+1	0	0	0	0	0	0+1	0
Players no longer at the club
8	DF	(Sweden) Elias Andersson	16	0	4	2	0	0	1	0	0	0	21	2
10	FW	(Sweden) Joel Asoro	10+6	3	3+2	1	0	0	2	0	1+1	1	15+9	5
11	FW	(Norway) Oliver Berg	19	3	1+2	1	0	0	1	0	1	0	22+2	4
16	FW	(Sweden) Victor Edvardsen	6+5	2	5	0	0	0	1	0	0	0	12+5	2
18	FW	(Sweden) Jacob Bergström	0+6	0	1+3	0	0	0	0+2	0	0	0	1+11	0
22	MF	(Sweden) Wilmer Odefalk	0+1	0	0	0	0	0	0	0	0	0	0+1	0

=== Goalscorers ===
The list is sorted by shirt number when total goals are equal.

Rnk	Pos	No.	Player	Allsvenskan	Svenska Cupen 2022/23	Svenska Cupen 2023/24	Europa Conference League 2022/23	Europa Conference League 2023/24	Total
1	DF	3	(Sweden) Marcus Danielson	5	0	1	0	0	6
1	MF	13	(Sweden) Hampus Finndell	5	1	0	0	0	6
3	FW	10	(Sweden) Joel Asoro	3	1	0	0	1	5
3	MF	23	(Norway) Gustav Wikheim	3	2	0	0	0	5
5	MF	9	(Sweden) Haris Radetinac	3	0	1	0	0	4
5	FW	11	(Norway) Oliver Berg	3	1	0	0	0	4
7	MF	7	(Sweden) Magnus Eriksson	1	2	0	0	0	3
7	MF	21	(Sweden) Lucas Bergvall	2	1	0	0	0	3
7	FW	22	(Azerbaijan) Musa Qurbanlı	2	0	1	0	0	3
7	FW	29	(Sweden) Noel Milleskog	1	0	2	0	0	3
11	DF	4	(Sweden) Jesper Löfgren	1	0	0	0	1	2
11	DF	8	(Sweden) Elias Andersson	0	2	0	0	0	2
11	MF	14	(Sweden) Besard Šabović	1	1	0	0	0	2
11	FW	15	(Sweden) Oskar Fallenius	2	0	0	0	0	2
11	FW	16	(Sweden) Victor Edvardsen	2	0	0	0	0	2
11	FW	18	(Angola) Felix Vá	2	0	0	0	0	2
17	DF	2	(Sweden) Piotr Johansson	0	1	0	0	0	1
17	MF	6	(Finland) Rasmus Schüller	1	0	0	0	0	1
Total				37	12	5	0	2	56

=== Disciplinary ===
Updated 12 November 2023
The list is sorted by shirt number when total cards are equal.

Rnk	Pos	No.	Name	Allsvenskan			Svenska Cupen 2022/23			Svenska Cupen 2023/24			Europa Conference League 2022/23			Europa Conference League 2023/24			Total		
Rnk	Pos	No.	Name	Yellow card	Second yellow card	Red card	Yellow card	Second yellow card	Red card	Yellow card	Second yellow card	Red card	Yellow card	Second yellow card	Red card	Yellow card	Second yellow card	Red card	Yellow card	Second yellow card	Red card
1	MF	6	(Finland) Rasmus Schüller	9	0	0	0	0	0	0	0	0	0	0	0	2	0	0	11	0	0
2	MF	13	(Sweden) Hampus Finndell	7	0	0	1	0	0	0	0	0	0	0	0	0	0	0	8	0	0
3	MF	14	(Sweden) Besard Šabović	4	0	0	1	0	0	0	0	0	0	0	0	0	0	0	5	0	0
4	DF	2	(Sweden) Piotr Johansson	3	0	0	1	0	0	0	0	0	0	0	0	0	0	0	4	0	0
4	DF	3	(Sweden) Marcus Danielson	2	0	0	0	0	0	0	0	0	0	0	1	0	0	0	2	0	1
4	MF	9	(Sweden) Haris Radetinac	3	0	0	0	0	0	0	0	0	1	0	0	0	0	0	4	0	0
7	DF	4	(Sweden) Jesper Löfgren	2	0	0	1	0	0	0	0	0	0	0	0	0	0	0	3	0	0
7	DF	8	(Sweden) Elias Andersson	2	0	0	0	0	0	0	0	0	1	0	0	0	0	0	3	0	0
7	FW	16	(Sweden) Victor Edvardsen	1	0	0	2	0	0	0	0	0	0	0	0	0	0	0	3	0	0
7	DF	17	(Spain) Carlos Moros Gracia	2	0	0	0	0	0	0	0	0	1	0	0	0	0	0	3	0	0
7	GK	35	(Sweden) Jacob Widell Zetterström	1	0	1	0	0	0	0	0	0	0	0	0	0	0	0	1	0	1
12	MF	7	(Sweden) Magnus Eriksson	2	0	0	0	0	0	0	0	0	0	0	0	0	0	0	2	0	0
12	FW	10	(Sweden) Joel Asoro	1	0	0	1	0	0	0	0	0	0	0	0	0	0	0	2	0	0
12	FW	15	(Sweden) Oskar Fallenius	2	0	0	0	0	0	0	0	0	0	0	0	0	0	0	2	0	0
12	MF	21	(Sweden) Lucas Bergvall	2	0	0	0	0	0	0	0	0	0	0	0	0	0	0	2	0	0
12	MF	23	(Norway) Gustav Wikheim	0	0	0	1	0	0	0	0	0	0	0	0	1	0	0	2	0	0
12	DF	26	(Sweden) Samuel Dahl	2	0	0	0	0	0	0	0	0	0	0	0	0	0	0	2	0	0
18	FW	29	(Sweden) Noel Milleskog	1	0	0	0	0	0	0	0	0	0	0	0	0	0	0	1	0	0
Total				46	0	1	8	0	0	0	0	0	3	0	1	3	0	0	61	0	2

=== Clean sheets ===
The list is sorted by shirt number when total clean sheets are equal.

Rnk	No.	Player	Allsvenskan	Svenska Cupen 2022/23	Svenska Cupen 2023/24	Europa Conference League 2022/23	Europa Conference League 2023/24	Total
1	35	(Sweden) Jacob Widell Zetterström	11	0	0	0	0	11
2	30	(Sweden) Tommi Vaiho	3	0	0	0	0	3
3	40	(Sweden) André Picornell	1	0	0	0	0	1
Total			15	0	0	0	0	15
