= 2023–24 Svenska Cupen =

Tournament details
- Country: Sweden
- Dates: 23 May 2023 – 1 May 2024
- Teams: 96

Final positions
- Champions: Malmö FF
- Runners-up: Djurgårdens IF

Tournament statistics
- Matches played: 64
- Goals scored: 220 (3.44 per match)
- Top goal scorer: Remo Gotfredsen Grgic (5)
- All statistics correct as of 27 September 2023.

The 2023–24 Svenska Cupen was the 68th season of the Svenska Cupen and the twelfth season with the current format. The winners qualified for the first qualifying round of the 2024–25 UEFA Europa League. A total of 96 clubs entered the competition, 64 teams from district sites and 32 from the Allsvenskan and the Superettan.

Malmö FF won the cup on 1 May 2024, defeating Djurgårdens IF 4–1 on penalties in the final after a 1–1 draw. Since they qualified based on league position, the Europa League spot was passed to the second-placed team of the 2023 Allsvenskan.

== Round dates ==
The schedule of the competition is as follows.

Phase	Round	Match date
Initial rounds	Round 1	23 May – 2 July 2023
Initial rounds	Round 2	16 – 24 August 2023
Group stage	Matchday 1	17 – 19 February 2024
Group stage	Matchday 2	24 – 26 February 2024
Group stage	Matchday 3	2 – 4 March 2024
Knockout stage	Quarter-final	9/10 March 2024
Knockout stage	Semi-final	16/17 March 2024
Knockout stage	Final	1 May 2024

== Teams ==
Round	Clubs remaining	Clubs involved	Winners from previous round	New entries this round	Leagues participating in this round
Round 1	96	64	0	64	Division 1 (18 teams); Division 2 (28 teams); Division 3 (10 teams); Division 4 (7 teams); Division 5 (1 team)
Round 2	64	64	32	32	Allsvenskan (16 teams); Superettan (16 teams); Division 1 (13 teams); Division 2 (11 teams); Division 3 (5 teams); Division 4 (3 teams)
Group stage	32	32	32	0	Allsvenskan (16 teams); Superettan (14 teams); Division 1 (1 team); Division 2 (1 team)

== Round 1 ==
64 clubs from the third tier or lower of the Swedish league system competed in this round.

Number of teams per tier still in competition
Allsvenskan (tier 1)	Superettan (tier 2)	Ettan (tier 3)	Division 2 (tier 4)	Division 3 (tier 5)	Division 4 (tier 6)	Division 5 (tier 7)	Total
16 / 16	16 / 16	18 / 18	28 / 28	10 / 10	7 / 7	1 / 1	96 / 96

=== Matches ===
23 May 2023	IFK Skövde (4)	2–4 (a.e.t.)	Husqvarna (4)	Skövde
19:00 CEST (UTC+2)	Al Rahman 61'; Salihovic 94'	Report	Rubin 48'; Lind (yellow card) 54'; Lindström Leister 92' (yellow card) 94'; Avdic (yellow card) 98'; Alsendi 118', 120+1'	Stadium: Södermalms IP; Attendance: 150; Referee: Ludvig Hallström

30 May 2023	Torstorp (6)	0–3	Smedby (4)	Finspång
19:00 CEST (UTC+2)	Låringe Jarehall (yellow card) 87'	Report	Holm 27'; Arvidsson 45+1', 86'; Frid (yellow card) 77'	Stadium: Rejmes Arena; Attendance: 117; Referee: Jasin Holmegren

30 May 2023	Rosengård (4)	1–0	IFK Malmö (4)	Malmö
19:00 CEST (UTC+2)	El Harrab (yellow card) 69' (goal) 89'	Report	Jörgensen (yellow card) 8'; Gashi (yellow card) 43'; Dangi (yellow card) 90+4'	Stadium: Rosengårds Södra IP; Attendance: 270; Referee: Arianit Abazi

31 May 2023	Höllviken (5)	0–1 (a.e.t.)	Lunds BK (3)	Höllviken
19:00 CEST (UTC+2)	Svensson (yellow card) 111'; Osmanovski (yellow card) 118' (yellow-red card) 118'	Report	Zetterberg (yellow card) 58'; Wendt 110'; Nilsson (yellow card) 118'; Sandström (yellow card) 120'	Stadium: Höllvikens IP; Referee: Christoffer Södergren

6 June 2023	Katrineholm (6)	1–1 (a.e.t.) (5–4 p)	Haninge (4)	Katrineholm
14:00 CEST (UTC+2)	Sindjui 21'; Plantin (yellow card) 54'	Report	Yasar 15'; Ceesay (yellow card) 52'; Jemal (yellow card) 86' (yellow-red card) 108'	Stadium: Backavallen; Attendance: 200; Referee: Augin Melki

6 June 2023	Berga (4)	3–0	Oskarshamn (3)	Kalmar
15:00 CEST (UTC+2)	Eliassi 19', 87'; Fredriksson (yellow card) 40'; Citaku (yellow card) 54'; Schylström 82'	Report	Nícolas (yellow card) 89' (yellow-red card) 90+3'	Stadium: Bergaviks IP; Attendance: 285; Referee: Barech Afzal-Khan

7 June 2023	Sollentuna (3)	1–0	Vasalund (3)	Sollentuna
19:00 CEST (UTC+2)	Stenstrand 44'; Engberg (yellow card) 53'; Käck (yellow card) 58'	Report	Maripuu (yellow card) 26'; Ersoy (yellow card) 82'	Stadium: Sollentunavallen; Attendance: 200; Referee: Nael Gazhi Shabo

7 June 2023	FBK Karlstad (4)	1–2	Örebro Syrianska (3)	Karlstad
19:00 CEST (UTC+2)	Chebil 35' (pen.); Jernberg (yellow card) 82'; Qassem (red card) 90+4'	Report	Tanda 11'; Mushitu 78'; Gustafsson (yellow card) 89'; Ajdarević (yellow card) 90+2'; Dyplin (yellow card) 90+3'	Stadium: Örsholmen IP Docero Arena; Attendance: 215; Referee: Rasmus Ekelund

8 June 2023	Trollhättan (3)	4–3	Ahlafors (3)	Trollhättan
18:00 CEST (UTC+2)	Liimatainen 16'; Helm 56', 74'; Embaye (yellow card) 60'; Adu 78'	Report	Jatta (yellow card) 15'; Clason 67'; Kocevski 82'; Abadid 90+2' (o.g.)	Stadium: Edsborgs IP; Attendance: 249; Referee: Niclas Karlsson

12 June 2023	Laholm (4)	1–2	IFK Hässleholm (4)	Laholm
19:00 CEST (UTC+2)	Cakolli (yellow card) 53'; Zeqiri 87'; H. Johansson (yellow card) 90+3'	Report	Rama 8'; Tikkanen (yellow card) 31'; Willseus (yellow card) 32'; Roslund 86'	Stadium: Glänninge Park; Attendance: 145; Referee: Mattias Theander

13 June 2023	Göteborgs FF (6)	0–2	Tvååker (3)	Gothenburg
19:15 CEST (UTC+2)	Lindström (yellow card) 54'; Pyk (yellow card) 72' (yellow-red card) 84'	Report	Stenqvist 17', 20'	Stadium: Majvallen 1 Konstgräs; Attendance: 206; Referee: Abdinaser Bashir

14 June 2023	Korsnäs (5)	0–6	Sandviken (3)	Falun
19:00 CEST (UTC+2)	Knöös Södergren (yellow card) 73'	Report	Vikgren 19' (pen.), 88'; Söderberg 54', 75'; Junior 56'; Tesfay Habte 83'	Stadium: Lindvallen; Referee: Hannes Persson

20 June 2023	Rågsved (4)	1–1 (a.e.t.) (3–4 p)	Franke (4)	Stockholm
19:30 CEST (UTC+2)	Simovski (red card) 47'; Varto (yellow card) 75'; Ada 93' (yellow card) 113'; Faiqi (yellow card) 90+1'; Roka (yellow card) 98'; Malo Bangura (yellow card) 114'	Report	Lindemann (yellow card) 45'; Siljander (yellow card) 98'; Jacinto 117'	Stadium: Hagsätra IP; Attendance: 120; Referee: Adli Assali

21 June 2023	Zenith (4)	2–1	Oddevold (3)	Kvisljungeby
19:00 CEST (UTC+2)	Norin 40' (yellow card) 63'; Nyström (yellow card) 45+1'; Hansson (yellow card) 69'; Wennerqvist (yellow card) 72'; Jonsson 77'	Report	Vitija 18'; Ådahl (yellow card) 73'; Karlin (yellow card) 84'	Stadium: Hovgårdsvallen; Attendance: 480; Referee: Honraw Ghassali

26 June 2023	Torestorp/Älekulla (6)	0–11	Falkenberg (3)	Torestorp
19:00 CEST (UTC+2)	Hellgren (yellow card) 30'	Report	Gotfredsen Grgic 3', 69', 77', 86'; Helldén 6'; Ärlig 9'; Sibelius 33'; E. Hintsa 61'; Farah Shahin 66', 81'; O. Hintsa 73'	Stadium: Svansjövallen IP; Attendance: 367; Referee: Jure Sosic

27 June 2023	Gute (4)	1–3	Stocksund (3)	Visby
17:30 CEST (UTC+2)	Elofsson (yellow card) 36'; Hägglund (yellow card) 69'; Öhman 90+1'	Report	Björklund 4'; Edeland 30'; Tesfai (yellow card) 35'; Bagir 80'	Stadium: Gutavallen; Attendance: 451; Referee: Lukas Wallin

27 June 2023	Täby FK (3)	0–3	Nordic United FC (3)	Täby
19:00 CEST (UTC+2)	Butros (yellow card) 90+3'	Report	Peter 40'; El Asbahi 43' (pen.); Masangane 48'; Aphrem (yellow card) 64'; Gürsac (yellow card) 88'	Stadium: Tibblevallen; Attendance: 205; Referee: Jasin Holmegren

27 June 2023	Hässleholms IF (4)	3–2 (a.e.t.)	Räppe (4)	Hässleholm
19:00 CEST (UTC+2)	Andersson (yellow card) 48'; Nader 60'; Johnsson 65'; Karimi (yellow card) 85'; Christiansson (yellow card) 105'; Burehed 105' (pen.)	Report	Vllasalija 19'; Gabrielsson (yellow card) 29'; Ingemarsson 40'; Lindeborg (yellow card) 58'; Wibrån (yellow card) 101'; Vukasović (yellow card) 106'	Stadium: Österås IP; Attendance: 150; Referee: Pontus Karlsson

28 June 2023	Karlberg (4)	1–2	Stockholm Internazionale (3)	Stockholm
19:00 CEST (UTC+2)	Okur 63'; Hamidi (yellow card) 78'; Karlsson (yellow card) 83'	Report	Bulut 38'; Rashidi 43'; Złotnik (yellow card) 55'; Jan (yellow card) 90+2'; Nyberg (yellow card) 90+5'	Stadium: Stadshagens IP; Attendance: 500; Referee: Oscar Forsberg

28 June 2023	IFK Simrishamn (4)	0–5	Olympic (3)	Simrishamn
19:00 CEST (UTC+2)	Lindström (yellow card) 40'; Andersson (yellow card) 40' (yellow-red card) 48'; Olsson (yellow card) 70'	Report	Ayari (yellow card) 15'; Robert (yellow card) 35'; Igbonekwu 44'; Atajic 45+3' (pen.); Andersson 78', 84'; Diagne 90+4'	Stadium: Korsavads IC A-plan; Referee: Stjepan Dodik

28 June 2023	Skå IK & Bygdegård (7)	0–4	Österåker United (4)	Skå
20:00 CEST (UTC+2)	Möller (yellow card) 67'; Thelin (yellow card) 71'; Eriksson (yellow card) 78'	Report	Ahlberg 5', 59'; Parszyk 30' (o.g.); Räisänen 80'	Stadium: Svanängens IP 2 Attendance: 428; Referee: Adli Assali

29 June 2023	IFK Luleå (4)	1–1 (a.e.t.) (5–4 p)	Skellefteå (4)	Luleå
19:00 CEST (UTC+2)	Kenedy Santos 17'; Canina (yellow card) 66'; Olausson (yellow card) 69'; Vluegels (yellow card) 72'; Bergman (yellow card) 107'; Alatalo (yellow card) 117'	Report	Lööf (yellow card) 44'; Ruales (yellow card) 52'; Hedström 64'; Johansson (yellow card) 74'; Gustafsson (yellow card) 120+1'	Stadium: Nyabvallen; Attendance: 224; Referee: Andreas Forsberg

29 June 2023	Hudiksvall (4)	7–0	Gottne IF (4)	Hudiksvall
19:00 CEST (UTC+2)	Näsholm 26'; Sener 37' (yellow card) 62'; Zerai 40', 90'; Nuur 74'; Olsso 79', 82'	Report	Dinu Suta (yellow card) 75'	Stadium: Glysis Sparbanken Arena; Attendance: 443; Referee: Hakan Modigh

29 June 2023	Jönköpings BK (5)	5–1	Hemgårdarnas BK (5)	Jönköping
19:00 CEST (UTC+2)	Bexell 3', 74', 81'; Bakic 12'; Korjenic (yellow card) 40'; Jankovic (yellow card) 77'; Svefors 79'	Report	Osman 41' (pen.) (yellow card) 80'; Nuwia (red card) 61'; Pepeljak (yellow card) 66'; Arif (yellow card) 75'	Stadium: Junebäcken IP 1 Attendance: 80; Referee: Toni Galic

30 June 2023	Tyresö FF (6)	2–1 (a.e.t.)	IFK Uppsala (4)	Tyresö
19:00 CEST (UTC+2)	Ek (yellow card) 46'; Sköld (yellow card) 56'; Spännare 82'; Brodsky 93'; Mulasmajic (yellow card) 108'; Eriksson (yellow card) 113'; Holmgren (yellow card) 120'	Report	Löfving Svensson (yellow card) 43'; Carlsson 52'; Fekovic (yellow card) 56'	Stadium: Tyresövallen; Attendance: 150; Referee: Joel Wessman

1 July 2023	Lucksta (5)	5–3 (a.e.t.)	IFK Östersund (4)	Sundsvall
13:00 CEST (UTC+2)	Hamdan 37', 96' (yellow card) 109'; Granat 39'; Karlsson (yellow card) 88'; Turay 101'; Tahir 105+1'; Habte Eyes (yellow card) 116'	Report	Tegnhed (yellow card) 16'; Omeje (yellow card) 45' (goal) 55', 81'; Bodén (yellow card) 82' (yellow-red card) 92'; Talsi (yellow card) 85'; Olofsson 120'	Stadium: Sörforsvallen; Attendance: 150; Referee: Thilip Nadarajah

1 July 2023	Högsäter (6)	0–3	IF Karlstad (3)	Högsäter
13:00 CEST (UTC+2)		Report	Bahar Johansson 40', 89'; Björndahl 90+1'	Stadium: Genevi IP 1 Attendance: 263; Referee: Martin Thorén

1 July 2023	Huddinge (4)	1–2 (a.e.t.)	Dalkurd (3)	Huddinge
14:00 CEST (UTC+2)	J. Corneliusson 34'; Lindström (yellow card) 67' (yellow-red card) 90+3'; Martiatu Nordeman (yellow card) 68'	Report	Ali (yellow card) 31'; Rabet (yellow card) 52'; Deprem 67', 94'; Wikman (yellow card) 75'	Stadium: Källbrinks IP; Referee: Nael Gazhi Shabo

1 July 2023	Karlshamn (5)	3–0	Lindsdal (5)	Karlshamn
14:00 CEST (UTC+2)	Feizi 47', 83'; Karlsson (yellow card) 56'; Lindqvist 58'	Report	Holmgren (yellow card) 75'	Stadium: Vägga IP 1 Referee: Fidan Hasani

1 July 2023	Roslagsbro IF (6)	2–1 (a.e.t.)	Järfälla (4)	Norrtälje
16:00 CEST (UTC+2)	Kielin 31' (o.g.); Laprasit (yellow card) 101'; Eriksson 119'; Jansson (yellow card) 120'	Report	Khan 11'; Lönn (yellow card) 54'; Issa (yellow card) 97' (yellow-red card) 108'; Ruiz (yellow card) 101' (yellow-red card) 120'	Stadium: Vårlyckan 2 Referee: Martin Johansson Oberle

1 July 2023	Dalstorp (5)	4–3 (a.e.t.)	Lindome (4)	Dalstorp
16:00 CEST (UTC+2)	A. Möller 38'; S. Möller 62', 105' (yellow card) 115'; Ibishi (yellow card) 63'; Larsson (yellow card) 86'; Gustafsson 92'	Report	Hussain 17'; Persborn 69'; Al Jarah (yellow card) 90'; Nilsson 105+1'	Stadium: Dalshov A-plan; Attendance: 250; Referee: Petter Seger Undén

2 July 2023	Åsarp-Trädet (5)	1–3	Jonsered (5)	Åsarp
17:00 CEST (UTC+2)	Sjöberg 37'	Report	Karlsson 56', 88'; Jakobsson 83'	Stadium: Åsarps IP; Attendance: 50; Referee: Cavit Kinali

== Round 2 ==
64 clubs will compete in this round. The 32 winners from Round 1, 16 teams from the Allsvenskan and 16 teams from the Superettan

Number of teams per tier still in competition
Allsvenskan (tier 1)	Superettan (tier 2)	Ettan (tier 3)	Division 2 (tier 4)	Division 3 (tier 5)	Division 4 (tier 6)	Division 5 (tier 7)	Total
16 / 16	16 / 16	13 / 18	11 / 28	5 / 10	3 / 7	0 / 1	64 / 96

=== Matches ===
16 August 2023	Dalkurd (3)	0–3	AIK (1)	Dalkurd
18:30 CEST (UTC+2)	Deprem (yellow card) 42'	Report	Keita (yellow card) 35'; Pittas 51'; Ayari 56'; Modesto 76'	Stadium: Studenternas IP; Attendance: 2,415; Referee: Farouk Nehdi

22 August 2023	Katrineholm (6)	0–3	Degerfors (1)	Katrineholm
18:00 CEST (UTC+2)		Report	Lindgren 65' (pen.), 72'; Bouzaiene 90+2'	Stadium: Backavallen A Referee: Vildan Gërxhaliu

22 August 2023	IFK Luleå (4)	2–1	AFC Eskilstuna (2)	Luleå
19:00 CEST (UTC+2)	Soini 19'; Drugge (yellow card) 38'; Olausson 86'; Richards (yellow card) 90+2'	Report	Lindberg 52'; Shamoun (yellow card) 90+4'	Stadium: Nyabvallen; Attendance: 379; Referee: Pontus Olofsson

22 August 2023	Sollentuna (3)	0–1	Gefle (2)	Sollentuna
19:00 CEST (UTC+2)	Soelberg (yellow card) 83'; Lindgren (yellow card) 90+2'	Report	Yakoub 9' (pen.); A. Lundin (yellow card) 43'	Stadium: Sollentunavallen; Attendance: 210; Referee: Tom Ghorbani

22 August 2023	Örebro Syrianska (3)	0–3	Västerås SK (2)	Örebro
19:00 CEST (UTC+2)	Bindelöv (yellow card) 23'; Drinic (yellow card) 40'; Jebnoun (yellow card) 73'	Report	Coulibaly 15', 18'; Hellblom 57'; Strompf (yellow card) 72'	Stadium: Örnsro IP; Attendance: 202; Referee: Enzo Vesprini

22 August 2023	Rosengård (4)	0–3	Helsingborg (2)	Malmö
19:00 CEST (UTC+2)	Addae (yellow card) 29'	Report	Al-Hamawi 22'; Muhsin 48', 69'	Stadium: Malmö IP; Attendance: 893; Referee: Mohamed Rachid

22 August 2023	Berga (4)	1–2	Värnamo (1)	Kalmar
19:00 CEST (UTC+2)	Eliassi 60'; Shirzad (yellow card) 81'	Report	Ademi 80' (yellow card) 90+1'; Zeljkovic 83'	Stadium: Bergaviks IP 1 Attendance: 500; Referee: Rinon Hasani

22 August 2023	IFK Hässleholm (4)	2–3	GAIS (2)	Hässleholm
19:00 CEST (UTC+2)	Burehed 28', 30'; Branting (yellow card) 85'	Report	Ahl Holmström 10'; Lundgren 63', 65'; Wängberg (yellow card) 75'	Stadium: Österås IP A-plan; Referee: Kristoffer Karlsson

23 August 2023	Roslagsbro IF (6)	0–5	Brommapojkarna (1)	Norrtälje
17:00 CEST (UTC+2)	Suopanki (yellow card) 15'; Einarsson (yellow card) 82'	Report	Magnusson 20'; Inoussa 21'; Abadid (yellow card) 35'; Nissen (yellow card) 43'; Vasić 73'; Odefalk 81'; Jordan 86'	Stadium: Vårlyckan 2 Referee: Farouk Ben Ahmed Nehdi

23 August 2023	Hudiksvall (4)	0–2	Hammarby (1)	Hudiksvall
17:00 CEST (UTC+2)	Söderlund (yellow card) 37'; Sener (yellow card) 52'; Näsholm (yellow card) 60'	Report	Đukanović 31'; Rafferty 63'; Demirol (yellow card) 90'	Stadium: Glysis Sparbanken Arena; Attendance: 655; Referee: Edvin Sundkvist

23 August 2023	Trollhättan (3)	0–4	Landskrona (2)	Trollhättan
18:00 CEST (UTC+2)	Zurmati (yellow card) 3'; Montagna (red card) 53'	Report	Edvardsson 36'; Ihler 46'; Diawara 61'; Rapp (yellow card) 76'; Asare 81'	Stadium: Edsborgs IP A-plan; Attendance: 503; Referee: Fikret Buqa

23 August 2023	Dalstorp (5)	0–2	Utsikten (2)	Dalstorp
18:00 CEST (UTC+2)	Aso (yellow card) 55'; Bygård (yellow card) 70'; Ibishi (yellow card) 90'	Report	Marcelo 33'; Bosnic 41'; Gorgos (yellow card) 65'	Stadium: Dalshov Konstgräs; Attendance: 350; Referee: Granit Maqedonci

23 August 2023	Tvååker (3)	1–2	Kalmar FF (1)	Tvååker
18:00 CEST (UTC+2)	Bertilsson (yellow card) 62'; Andersson (yellow card) 70'; Petersson 74'; Gudmundsson (yellow card) 86'	Report	Ólafsson (yellow card) 42'; Hallberg 51'; Shamoun 62'; Girmai Netabay (yellow card) 83'	Stadium: Övrevi A Referee: Fredrick Oppong

23 August 2023	IF Karlstad (3)	1–2	Östersunds FK (2)	Karlstad
18:00 CEST (UTC+2)	van Schaik 3'	Report	Marklund 19'; Sporrong (yellow card) 65'; Kabuye 85'	Stadium: Sola Arena 1 Attendance: 1,147; Referee: Richard Sundell

23 August 2023	Smedby (4)	0–2	Malmö FF (1)	Norrköping
18:30 CEST (UTC+2)	Strandberg (yellow card) 67'	Report	Rieks 65'; Siby (yellow card) 85'; Ali 90+2'	Stadium: PreZero Arena; Attendance: 2,004; Referee: Andreas Johansson

23 August 2023	Tyresö FF (6)	1–2	Örebro (2)	Tyresö
19:00 CEST (UTC+2)	Ek (yellow card) 5'; Spännare 39'; Ekengren (yellow card) 45+1'; Mulasmajic (yellow card) 90'; Löfdahl (yellow card) 90+1'; Brodsky (yellow card) 90+3'	Report	Larsson 19'; Seger (yellow card) 28'; Kroon 71'; Shlimon (yellow card) 81'; Nicklasson (yellow card) 90+2'	Stadium: Tyresövallen 1 Attendance: 1,000; Referee: Martin Johansson

23 August 2023	Stocksund (3)	0–2	GIF Sundsvall (2)	Danderyd
18:30 CEST (UTC+2)	Norrman (yellow card) 60'	Report	Durmaz 9', 37'; Lundström (yellow card) 60'; Fredin (yellow card) 76'	Stadium: Danderyds Gymnasium; Referee: Teddy Dahlin

23 August 2023	Sandviken (3)	1–5	Djurgården (1)	Sandviken
19:00 CEST (UTC+2)	Junior 31'; Pacha (yellow card) 62'; Kouyaté (yellow card) 67'	Report	Milleskog 10', 66'; Qurbanlı 12'; Danielson 45' (pen.); Radetinac 90'	Stadium: Jernvallen; Attendance: 2,583; Referee: Jasmin Svraka

23 August 2023	Stockholm Internazionale (3)	0–0 (a.e.t.) (3–4 p)	Brage (2)	Stockholm
19:00 CEST (UTC+2)	Zlotnik (yellow card) 69'; Hassan (yellow card) 75'; Dobrijevic (yellow card) 102'; Sterner (yellow card) 113'; Rashidi (yellow card) 116'	Report	Gayi (yellow card) 88'	Stadium: Hammarby IP 1 Attendance: 545; Referee: Rambod Beigi

23 August 2023	Franke (4)	0–5	Skövde (2)	Råby IP
19:00 CEST (UTC+2)		Report	Agerborn 38', 59', 88'; Frisk 67'; Lennerskog 81'	Attendance: Våsteras

23 August 2023	Nordic United FC (3)	3–0	Jönköpings Södra (2)	Södertälje
19:00 CEST (UTC+2)	Peter 15', 90+1'; Ceylan 75' (pen.)	Report		Stadium: Södertälje Fotbollsarena

23 August 2023	Lunds BK (3)	0–2	Elfsborg (1)	Lund
19:00 CEST (UTC+2)		Report	Guðjohnsen 22', 39'	Stadium: Klostergårdens IP

23 August 2023	Falkenberg (3)	1–2	Öster (2)	Falkenberg
19:00 CEST (UTC+2)	Gotfredsen Grgic 38'	Report	Sigurgeirsson 23'; Wiberg 45'	Stadium: Falcon Alkoholfri Arena

23 August 2023	Jönköpings BK (5)	0–2	Örgryte (2)	Jönköping
19:00 CEST (UTC+2)		Report	Lundberg 47'; Mujanic 77'	Stadium: Stadsparksvallen

23 August 2023	Zenith (4)	0–2	IFK Göteborg (1)	Kvisljungeby
19:00 CEST (UTC+2)		Report	Tyrén 17'; Selmani 70'	Stadium: Hovgårdsvallen

23 August 2023	Husqvarna (4)	0–2	Trelleborgs FF (2)	Husqvarna
19:00 CEST (UTC+2)		Report	Dickman 38'; Saeid 73'	Stadium: Vapenvallen

23 August 2023	IFK Hässleholm (4)	0–4	Halmstad (1)	Hässleholm
19:00 CEST (UTC+2)		Report	Cooper-Love 64', 78'; Granath 68', 72'	Stadium: Österås IP

23 August 2023	Olympic (3)	0–1	Mjällby (1)	Malmö
19:00 CEST (UTC+2)		Report	Moro 86'	Stadium: Malmö IP

24 August 2023	Lucksta (5)	0–6	IFK Norrköping (1)	Sundsvall
18:00 CEST (UTC+2)		Report	Björk 9', 20'; Sigurgeirsson 72'; Vito 75'; Bolma 82'; Jansson 87'	Stadium: Sörforsvallen

24 August 2023	Karlshamn (5)	0–1	Varberg (1)	Karlshamn
18:00 CEST (UTC+2)		Report	Sisse 44'	Stadium: Vägga IP 1

24 August 2023	Österåker United (4)	0–6	IK Sirius (1)	Åkersberga
19:00 CEST (UTC+2)		Report	Alsanati 4', 54'; Sjögrell 19'; Abou Ali 27'; Castegren 37'; Ljungberg 90'	Stadium: Österåkers Friidrottsarena

27 September 2023	Jonsered (5)	1–4	Häcken (1)	Jonsered
18:30 CEST (UTC+2)	Carestam 52'	Report	Dahbo 19', 90'; Sonko 76'; Chilufya 90'	Stadium: Jonsereds IP Konstgräs

== Group stage ==
Svenska cupen 2023/2024
Group stage
2023–24 Svenska Cupen (Sweden)

The 32 winners from Round 2 were divided into eight groups of four teams. The 16 highest ranked winners from the previous rounds were seeded to the top two positions in each group and the 16 remaining winners were unseeded in the draw. The ranking of the 16 seeded teams was decided by league position in the 2023 season. All teams in the group stage play each other once, the highest-ranked teams from the previous rounds and teams from tier three or lower play two home matches.

Number of teams per tier still in competition
Allsvenskan (tier 1)	Superettan (tier 2)	Ettan (tier 3)	Division 2 (tier 4)	Division 3 (tier 5)	Division 4 (tier 6)	Division 5 (tier 7)	Total
16 / 16	14 / 16	1 / 18	1 / 28	0 / 10	0 / 7	0 / 1	32 / 96

=== Qualified teams ===
Seeded

- Malmö FF (1)
- AIK (1)
- Degerfors IF (1)
- IFK Värnamo (1)
- IF Brommapojkarna (1)
- Hammarby IF (1)
- Kalmar FF (1)
- Djurgårdens IF (1)
- IF Elfsborg (1)
- IFK Göteborg (1)
- Halmstads BK (1)
- Mjällby AIF (1)
- IFK Norrköping (1)
- Varbergs BoIS (1)
- IK Sirius (1)
- BK Häcken (1)

Unseeded

- Trelleborgs FF (2)
- Örgryte IS (2)
- Östers IF (2)
- Skövde AIK (2)
- GIF Sundsvall (2)
- Örebro SK (2)
- Östersunds FK (2)
- GAIS (2)
- Helsingborgs IF (2)
- Västerås SK (2)
- Gefle IF (2)
- Landskrona BoIS (2)
- Utsiktens BK (2)
- IK Brage (2)
- Nordic United FC (3)
- IFK Luleå (4)

=== Group 1 ===
Pos	Team	Pld	W	D	L	GF	GA	GD	Pts	Qualification	MFF	ÖIF	VAR	IFKL
1	Malmö FF	3	2	1	0	11	1	+10	7	Advance to Knockout stage		2–0	1–1	
2	Östers IF	3	2	0	1	9	3	+6	6					5–0
3	Varbergs BoIS	3	1	1	1	6	5	+1	4			1–4		
4	IFK Luleå	3	0	0	3	0	17	−17	0		0–8		0–4	

Source: SvFF
Rules for classification: 1) Points; 2) Goal difference; 3) Goals scored; 4) Head-to-head record; 5) Lowest disciplinary points; 6) Highest ranked team

=== Group 2 ===
Pos	Team	Pld	W	D	L	GF	GA	GD	Pts	Qualification	DEG	IFE	GAIS	ÖIS
1	Degerfors IF	3	1	2	0	9	4	+5	5	Advance to Knockout stage			2–2	5–0
2	IF Elfsborg	3	1	1	1	6	5	+1	4		2–2		2–0	
3	GAIS	3	1	1	1	5	4	+1	4					3–0
4	Örgryte IS	3	1	0	2	3	10	−7	3			3–2		

Source: SvFF
Rules for classification: 1) Points; 2) Goal difference; 3) Goals scored; 4) Head-to-head record; 5) Lowest disciplinary points; 6) Highest ranked team

=== Group 3 ===
Pos	Team	Pld	W	D	L	GF	GA	GD	Pts	Qualification	IFB	BKH	ÖFK	LAN
1	IF Brommapojkarna	3	2	1	0	5	1	+4	7	Advance to Knockout stage			1–0	3–0
2	BK Häcken	3	1	1	1	5	4	+1	4		1–1		2–0	
3	Östersunds FK	3	1	0	2	1	3	−2	3					1–0
4	Landskrona BoIS	3	1	0	2	3	6	−3	3			3–2		

Source: SvFF
Rules for classification: 1) Points; 2) Goal difference; 3) Goals scored; 4) Head-to-head record; 5) Lowest disciplinary points; 6) Highest ranked team

=== Group 4 ===
Pos	Team	Pld	W	D	L	GF	GA	GD	Pts	Qualification	DIF	IFKG	SAIK	NUFC
1	Djurgårdens IF	3	3	0	0	10	0	+10	9	Advance to Knockout stage		3–0	2–0	
2	IFK Göteborg	3	2	0	1	5	6	−1	6				1–0	
3	Skövde AIK	3	1	0	2	1	3	−2	3					1–0
4	Nordic United FC	3	0	0	3	3	10	−7	0		0–5	3–4		

Source: SvFF
Rules for classification: 1) Points; 2) Goal difference; 3) Goals scored; 4) Head-to-head record; 5) Lowest disciplinary points; 6) Highest ranked team

=== Group 5 ===
Pos	Team	Pld	W	D	L	GF	GA	GD	Pts	Qualification	HBK	IFKV	TFF	HIF
1	Halmstads BK	3	2	1	0	5	3	+2	7	Advance to Knockout stage			1–1	3–2
2	IFK Värnamo	3	2	0	1	3	1	+2	6		0–1		2–0	
3	Trelleborgs FF	3	1	1	1	3	4	−1	4					2–1
4	Helsingborgs IF	3	0	0	3	3	6	−3	0			0–1		

Source: SvFF
Rules for classification: 1) Points; 2) Goal difference; 3) Goals scored; 4) Head-to-head record; 5) Lowest disciplinary points; 6) Highest ranked team

=== Group 6 ===
Pos	Team	Pld	W	D	L	GF	GA	GD	Pts	Qualification	AIK	ÖSK	KFF	GEF
1	AIK	3	2	1	0	5	2	+3	7	Advance to Knockout stage		3–1		1–0
2	Örebro SK	3	2	0	1	4	4	0	6				1–0	
3	Kalmar FF	3	1	1	1	4	3	+1	4		1–1			3–1
4	Gefle IF	3	0	0	3	2	6	−4	0			1–2		

Source: SvFF
Rules for classification: 1) Points; 2) Goal difference; 3) Goals scored; 4) Head-to-head record; 5) Lowest disciplinary points; 6) Highest ranked team

=== Group 7 ===
Pos	Team	Pld	W	D	L	GF	GA	GD	Pts	Qualification	MAIF	HAM	VSK	GIF
1	Mjällby AIF	3	2	1	0	6	3	+3	7	Advance to Knockout stage			2–0	3–2
2	Hammarby IF	3	1	1	1	5	4	+1	4		1–1		1–2	3–1
3	Västerås SK	3	1	1	1	3	4	−1	4					1–1
4	GIF Sundsvall	3	0	1	2	4	7	−3	1					

Source: SvFF
Rules for classification: 1) Points; 2) Goal difference; 3) Goals scored; 4) Head-to-head record; 5) Lowest disciplinary points; 6) Highest ranked team

=== Group 8 ===
Pos	Team	Pld	W	D	L	GF	GA	GD	Pts	Qualification	IFKN	IKS	IKB	UBK
1	IFK Norrköping	3	1	2	0	7	3	+4	5	Advance to Knockout stage			1–1	4–0
2	IK Sirius	3	1	2	0	4	2	+2	5		2–2			2–0
3	IK Brage	3	1	2	0	4	2	+2	5			0–0		
4	Utsiktens BK	3	0	0	3	1	9	−8	0				1–3	

Source: SvFF
Rules for classification: 1) Points; 2) Goal difference; 3) Goals scored; 4) Head-to-head record; 5) Lowest disciplinary points; 6) Highest ranked team

== Knockout stage ==
The eight group winners from the group stage entered the knockout stage, beginning with the quarter-finals. The top four group winners overall were seeded in the quarter-final draw, each facing one of the bottom four group winners (unseeded in the draw) at home.

=== Qualified teams ===
Pos	Grp	Team	Pld	W	D	L	GF	GA	GD	Pts	Qualification
1	4	Djurgårdens IF	3	3	0	0	10	0	+10	9	Seeded in quarter-final draw
2	1	Malmö FF	3	2	1	0	11	1	+10	7	Seeded in quarter-final draw
3	3	IF Brommapojkarna	3	2	1	0	5	1	+4	7	Seeded in quarter-final draw
4	7	Mjällby AIF	3	2	1	0	6	3	+3	7	Seeded in quarter-final draw
5	6	AIK	3	2	1	0	5	2	+3	7	Unseeded in quarter-final draw
6	5	Halmstads BK	3	2	1	0	5	3	+2	7	Unseeded in quarter-final draw
7	2	Degerfors IF	3	1	2	0	9	4	+5	5	Unseeded in quarter-final draw
8	8	IFK Norrköping	3	1	2	0	7	3	+4	5	Unseeded in quarter-final draw

Rules for classification: 1) Points; 2) Goal difference; 3) Goals scored; 4) Head-to-head record; 5) Lowest disciplinary points; 6) Highest ranked team

=== Bracket ===
Quarter-finals
9 March 2024 – Stockholm
IF Brommapojkarna	0
Halmstads BK (a.e.t.)	1
10 March 2024 – Malmö
Malmö FF	5
IFK Norrköping	2
9 March 2024 – Hällevik
Mjällby AIF	1
AIK	3
10 March 2024 – Stockholm
Djurgårdens IF	3
Degerfors IF	0

Semi-finals
16 March 2024 – Halmstad
Halmstads BK	0
Malmö FF	4
17 March 2024 – Stockholm
AIK	1 (2)
Djurgårdens IF (p)	1 (3)

Final
1 May 2024 – Malmö
Malmö FF (p)	1 (4)
Djurgårdens IF	1 (1)

=== Quarter-finals ===
9 March 2024	IF Brommapojkarna (1)	0–1 (a.e.t.)	Halmstads BK (1)	Stockholm
13:00 CEST (UTC+1)		Report	Ofosu-Ayeh 112'	Stadium: Grimsta IP; Attendance: 300; Referee: Victor Wolf

9 March 2024	Mjällby AIF (1)	1–3	AIK (1)	Hällevik
16:00 CEST (UTC+1)	Johansson 41' (pen.)	Report	Modesto 7'; Faraj 12'; Pittas 59'	Stadium: Strandvallen; Attendance: 2,477; Referee: Fredrik Klitte

10 March 2024	Djurgårdens IF (1)	3–0	Degerfors IF (1)	Stockholm
13:00 CEST (UTC+1)	Danielson 47'; Šabović 69'; Fallenius 84'	Report		Stadium: Tele2 Arena; Attendance: 12,828; Referee: Adam Ladebäck

10 March 2024	Malmö FF (1)	5–2	IFK Norrköping (1)	Malmö
16:00 CEST (UTC+1)	Jørgensen 15', 77'; Botheim 72'; Ali 83', 90+5'	Report	Björk 2'; Prica 90'	Stadium: Eleda Stadion; Attendance: 10,813; Referee: Glenn Nyberg

=== Semi-finals ===
16 March 2024	Halmstads BK (1)	0–4	Malmö FF (1)	Halmstad
15:00		Report	Botheim 50', 73'; Berg Johnsen 54'; Kiese Thelin 70'	Stadium: Örjans Vall; Attendance: 8,043; Referee: Kristoffer Karlsson

17 March 2024	AIK (1)	1–1 (a.e.t.) (2–3 p)	Djurgårdens IF (1)	Stockholm
15:00	Andersson 90+6'	Report	Bergvall 14'	Stadium: Friends Arena; Attendance: 36,910; Referee: Mohammed Al-Hakim
	Penalties
	Pittas (penalty scored); Salétros (penalty missed); Celina (penalty scored); Ring (penalty missed); Ayari (penalty missed)		(penalty scored) Danielson; (penalty missed) Ekdal; (penalty scored) Gulliksen; (penalty scored) Hümmet

=== Final ===
1 May 2024	Malmö FF (1)	1–1 (a.e.t.) (4–1 p)	Djurgårdens IF (1)	Malmö
14:00	Ali 70'	Report	Hümmet 78'	Stadium: Eleda Stadion; Referee: Adam Ladebäck
	Penalties
	Christiansen (penalty scored); Kiese Thelin (penalty scored); Olsson (penalty scored); Berg Johnsen (penalty scored)		(penalty scored) Danielson; (penalty missed) Radetinac; (penalty missed) Gulliksen
