= Joel Asoro =

Swedish footballer (born 1999)

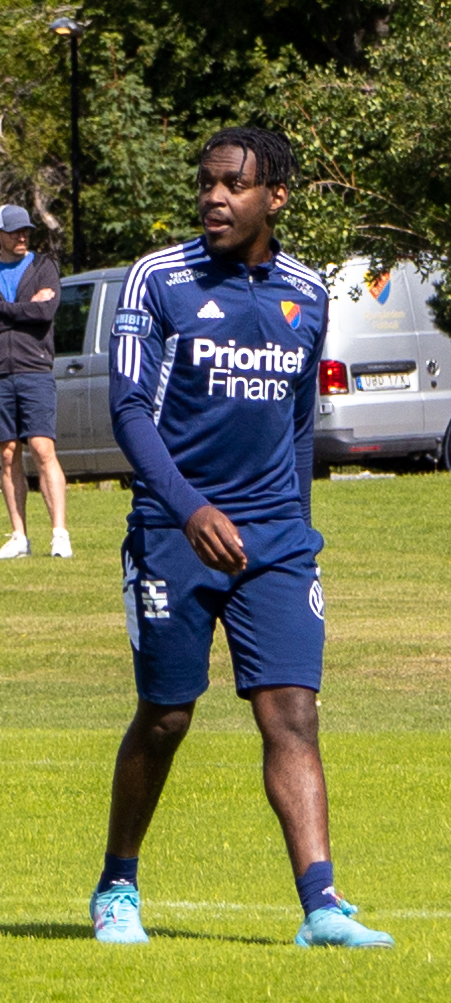
- Asoro in 2022

Personal information
- Full name: Joel Joshoghene Asoro
- Date of birth: 27 April 1999 (age 27)
- Place of birth: Stockholm, Sweden
- Height: 1.75 m (5 ft 9 in)
- Position: Winger

Team information
- Current team: Apollon Limassol
- Number: 29

Youth career
- –2011: IFK Haninge
- 2011–2015: IF Brommapojkarna
- 2015–2016: Sunderland

Senior career*
Years	Team	Apps	(Gls)
2016–2018	Sunderland	27	(3)
2018–2021	Swansea City	14	(0)
2019–2020	→ Groningen (loan)	15	(3)
2020–2021	→ Genoa (loan)	0	(0)
2021–2023	Djurgårdens IF	71	(12)
2023–2026	Metz	48	(5)
2024–2025	Metz B	3	(2)
2026	→ Djurgårdens IF (loan)	12	(2)
2026–	Apollon Limassol	7	(1)

International career^{‡}
2014–2016	Sweden U17	21	(14)
2016–2019	Sweden U21	17	(3)
2023	Sweden	2	(1)
- * Club domestic league appearances and goals as of 25 October 2026 ‡ National team caps and goals as of 21:45, 13 January 2023 (UTC)

Joel Joshoghene Asoro (born 27 April 1999) is a Swedish professional footballer who plays as a winger for Cypriot First Division club Apollon Limassol and the Sweden national team.

== Club career ==
=== Early career ===
Asoro started his career in his local club IFK Haninge in a southern Stockholm suburb. When he was eleven years old he moved to IF Brommapojkarna, well known throughout Sweden for its youth academy which has produced players such as John Guidetti, Albin Ekdal, Simon Tibbling, Dejan Kulusevski and Ludwig Augustinsson. Asoro was targeted for some of Europe's leading clubs, among them Manchester City, Manchester United, Chelsea and Juventus.

=== Sunderland ===
Asoro signed for English side Sunderland in 2015. On 21 August 2016, a year after joining the club, Asoro made his professional debut in the Premier League against Middlesbrough, coming on as an 81st-minute substitute for Duncan Watmore; in doing so he became Sunderland's youngest Premier League player, as well as the youngest Swedish national to feature. On 24 August 2016, Asoro was given his first Sunderland start under manager David Moyes in a 1–0 victory over League One side Shrewsbury Town in an EFL Cup second round tie. Asoro later appeared as a starter in the EFL Cup Round 3 victory over Championship side Queens Park Rangers and was subbed off for Josh Maja. On 18 January 2017, Asoro came off the substitutes bench to feature in a 2–0 FA Cup 4th Round Replay defeat to Burnley. Asoro scored his first Sunderland goal in a 1–0 victory over Hull City on 20 January 2018.

=== Swansea City ===
Asoro joined Swansea City on a four-year contract for a fee of £2 million in July 2018.

==== Loan to Groningen ====
On 15 August 2019, Asoro agreed to a loan move to Eredivisie club Groningen for the 2019–20 season. He made 17 appearances and scored three goals for the side before the football season in the Netherlands was suspended in March.

==== Loan to Genoa ====
On 16 September 2020, Asoro joined Serie A club Genoa on a season-long loan deal with a conditional obligation to buy.

=== Djurgårdens IF ===
On 8 February 2021, Asoro signed with Allsvenskan club Djurgårdens IF, keeping him with the club until 31 December 2024.

=== Metz ===
On 25 August 2023, Asoro joined Ligue 1 club Metz on a four-year contract, keeping him with the club until June 2027. On 16 September, Asoro scored his first goal with the Lorraine club, the only one in a 1–0 away win over Lens.

== International career ==
On 5 September 2016, Asoro made his debut for Sweden U21 starting the game against Spain in 1–1 draw. He was first called up to Sweden and made his full international debut for the team on 9 January 2023, replacing Christoffer Nyman 82 minutes into a friendly 2–0 win against Finland in which he also scored his first international goal.

== Personal life ==
Asoro's parents are from Nigeria. His sister, Abigail Glomazic is a professional basketball player who has played with the likes of CCC Polkowice and Sleza Wroclaw in Poland.

== Career statistics ==
=== Club ===
As of match played 18 January 2026

Appearances and goals by club, season and competition
Club	Season	League			National cup		League cup		Other		Total	
Club	Season	Division	Apps	Goals	Apps	Goals	Apps	Goals	Apps	Goals	Apps	Goals
Sunderland	2016–17	Premier League	1	0	1	0	2	0	—		4	0
Sunderland	2017–18	EFL Championship	26	3	1	0	2	0	—		29	3
Sunderland	Total		27	3	2	0	4	0	—		33	3
Swansea City	2018–19	EFL Championship	14	0	2	0	1	0	—		17	0
Swansea City	2020–21	EFL Championship	0	0	0	0	1	0	—		1	0
Swansea City	Total		14	0	2	0	2	0	—		18	0
Groningen (loan)	2019–20	Eredivisie	15	3	2	0	—		—		17	3
Genoa (loan)	2020–21	Serie A	0	0	0	0	—		—		0	0
Djurgården	2021	Allsvenskan	26	3	2	0	0	0	—		26	3
Djurgården	2022	Allsvenskan	29	6	2	0	0	0	12 (Note: Appearances in the UEFA Europa Conference League)	7	43	13
Djurgården	2023	Allsvenskan	16	3	5	1	0	0	4	1	25	5
Djurgården	Total		71	12	7	1	0	0	16	8	94	21
Metz	2023–24	Ligue 1	20	2	1	0	—		0	0	21	2
Metz	2024–25	Ligue 2	20	3	3	0	—		0	0	23	3
Metz	2025–26	Ligue 1	8	0	1	0	—		—		9	0
Metz	Total		48	5	5	0	—		0	0	53	5
Career total			175	23	20	1	6	0	16	8	217	32

=== International ===
Appearances and goals by national team and year
National team	Year	Apps	Goals
Sweden	2023	2	1
Total		2	1

Scores and results list Sweden's goal tally first, score column indicates score after each Asoro goal.

List of international goals scored by Joel Asoro
No.	Date	Venue	Opponent	Score	Result	Competition	Ref.
1	9 January 2023	Estádio Algarve, Faro/Loulé, Portugal	Finland	1–0	2–0	Friendly	
