= Dalstorps IF =

Swedish football club

- Full name: Dalstorps Idrottsförening
- Founded: 1949
- Ground: Dalshov; Dalstorp; Sweden
- Chairman: Jörgen Erikson
- Head coach: Tommy Berg, Erik Andersson
- Coach: , Magnus Larsson
- League: Division 2 Östra Götaland
- 2019: Division 2 Östra Götaland, 6th
Home colours

Dalstorps IF is a Swedish football club located in Dalstorp.

== Background ==
Dalstorps IF currently plays in Division 2 Västra Götaland which is the fourth tier of Swedish football. They play their home matches at the Dalshov in Dalstorp.

The club is affiliated to Västergötlands Fotbollförbund. Dalstorps IF played in the 2011 Svenska Cupen but lost 0–1 away to Onsala BK in the preliminary round.

== Season to season ==
In their most successful period Dalstorps IF competed in the following divisions:

Season	Level	Division	Section	Position	Movements
1980	Tier 4	Division 4	Västergötland Södra	1st	Promoted
1981	Tier 3	Division 3	Mellersta Götaland	12th	Relegated
1982	Tier 4	Division 4	Västergötland Södra	2nd	
1983	Tier 4	Division 4	Västergötland Södra	3rd	
1984	Tier 4	Division 4	Västergötland Södra	1st	Promoted
1985	Tier 3	Division 3	Mellersta Götaland	8th	
1986	Tier 3	Division 3	Sydvästra Götaland	10th	
1987*	Tier 4	Division 3	Sydvästra Götaland	7th	
1988	Tier 4	Division 3	Mellersta Götaland	7th	
1989	Tier 4	Division 3	Mellersta Götaland	12th	Relegated

* League restructuring in 1987 resulted in Division 1 being created at Tier 2 and subsequent divisions dropping a level.

In recent seasons Dalstorps IF have competed in the following divisions:

Season	Level	Division	Section	Position	Movements
2006*	Tier 7	Division 5	Västergötland Södra	1st	Promoted
2007	Tier 6	Division 4	Västergötland Södra	4th	
2008	Tier 6	Division 4	Västergötland Södra	12th	Relegated
2009	Tier 7	Division 5	Västergötland Södra	1st	Promoted
2010	Tier 6	Division 4	Västergötland Södra	2nd	Promotion Playoffs
2011	Tier 6	Division 4	Västergötland Södra	1st	Promoted
2012	Tier 5	Division 3	Sydvästra Götaland	2nd	Promoted
2013	Tier 4	Division 2	Västra Götaland	7th	

* League restructuring in 2006 resulted in a new division being created at Tier 3 and subsequent divisions dropping a level.

== Attendances ==
In recent seasons Dalstorps IF have had the following average attendances:

Season	Average attendance	Division / Section	Level
2012	432	Div 3 Sydvästra Götaland	Tier 5
2013	464	Div 2 Västra Götaland	Tier 4

* Attendances are provided in the Publikliga sections of the Svenska Fotbollförbundet website.
