= Jesper Löfgren =

Swedish footballer (born 1997)

Personal information
- Date of birth: 3 May 1997 (age 29)
- Place of birth: Kalmar, Sweden
- Height: 1.93 m (6 ft 4 in)
- Position: Defender

Team information
- Current team: Kalmar FF (on loan from Luzern)
- Number: 4

Youth career
- Nybro

Senior career*
Years	Team	Apps	(Gls)
2015–2016	Oskarshamn	27	(0)
2017	Karlskrona	25	(2)
2018	Mjällby	29	(5)
2019–2021	Brann	1	(0)
2019–2020	→ Mjällby (loan)	41	(4)
2021–2024	Djurgården	62	(2)
2023	→ IF Brommapojkarna (loan)	9	(0)
2024	→ Luzern (loan)	19	(0)
2024–	Luzern	11	(0)
2026–	Luzern U21	4	(0)
2026–	→ Kalmar FF (loan)	2	(0)
- * Club domestic league appearances and goals as of 20 September 2026

Jesper Löfgren (born 3 May 1997) is a Swedish professional footballer who plays as a defender for Allsvenskan club Kalmar FF on loan from Swiss club Luzern.

== Career ==
On 31 August 2026, Löfgren was loaned by his hometown club Kalmar FF until the end of 2026.
