= André Picornell =

Swedish footballer (born 2004)

Personal information
- Full name: André Carl Picornell
- Date of birth: 3 April 2004 (age 22)
- Place of birth: Stockholm, Sweden
- Height: 1.91 m (6 ft 3 in)
- Position: Goalkeeper

Team information
- Current team: Gil Vicente
- Number: 1

Youth career
- –2021: IF Brommapojkarna
- 2022: Djurgårdens IF
- 2024–: Gil Vicente

Senior career*
Years	Team	Apps	(Gls)
2023	Djurgårdens IF	2	(0)

International career^{‡}
2019–2020	Sweden U17	2	(0)
2021–2023	Sweden U19	7	(0)
2025	Sweden U21	3	(0)
- * Club domestic league appearances and goals as of 18 April 2023 ‡ National team caps and goals as of 18:08, 19 October 2025 (UTC)

André Carl Picornell (born 3 April 2004) is a professional footballer who plays as a goalkeeper for Primeira Liga club Gil Vicente.

== Club career ==
Picornell played in the youth sector of IF Brommapojkarna; after going on trial with the likes of Tottenham Hotspur, Feyenoord and Heerenveen, he joined Allsvenskan side Djurgårdens IF in November 2021, signing a two-year professional deal with the club. Throughout the 2022 season, the goalkeeper played for Djurgården's under-19 and under-21 teams, and was ultimately named as Goalkeeper of the Year for the former national championship. During the same campaign, he also made several bench appearances for the first team in the UEFA Europa Conference League.

On 9 April 2023, Picornell made his professional debut, coming on as a substitute for Gustav Wikheim in the 51st minute of a league match against IK Sirius, after first-choice keeper Jacob Widell Zetterström had been sent off. He managed to keep a clean sheet, as the game ended in a goalless draw.

He left Djurgårdens IF in January 2024, having turned down an offer to renew his contract with the club.

== International career ==
Due to his origins, Picornell is eligible to represent either Sweden or Spain at international level.

After playing for the Swedish under-17 national team, in May 2021 he accepted a call-up for a training camp with the Spain U17s. He then came back to represent Sweden at under-18 and under-19 levels.

== Personal life ==
Picornell was born in Sweden to a Swedish mother and a Spanish Catalan father.
