= Torestorp =

- Location within Västra Götaland Location within Sweden
- Coordinates: 57°23′N 12°41′E
- Country: Sweden
- Province: Västergötland
- County: Västra Götaland County
- Municipality: Mark Municipality

Area
  - Total: 0.70 km^{2} (0.27 sq mi)

Population (31 December 2010)
  - Total: 419
  - Density: 595/km^{2} (1,540/sq mi)
- Time zone: UTC+1 (CET)
  - Summer (DST): UTC+2 (CEST)

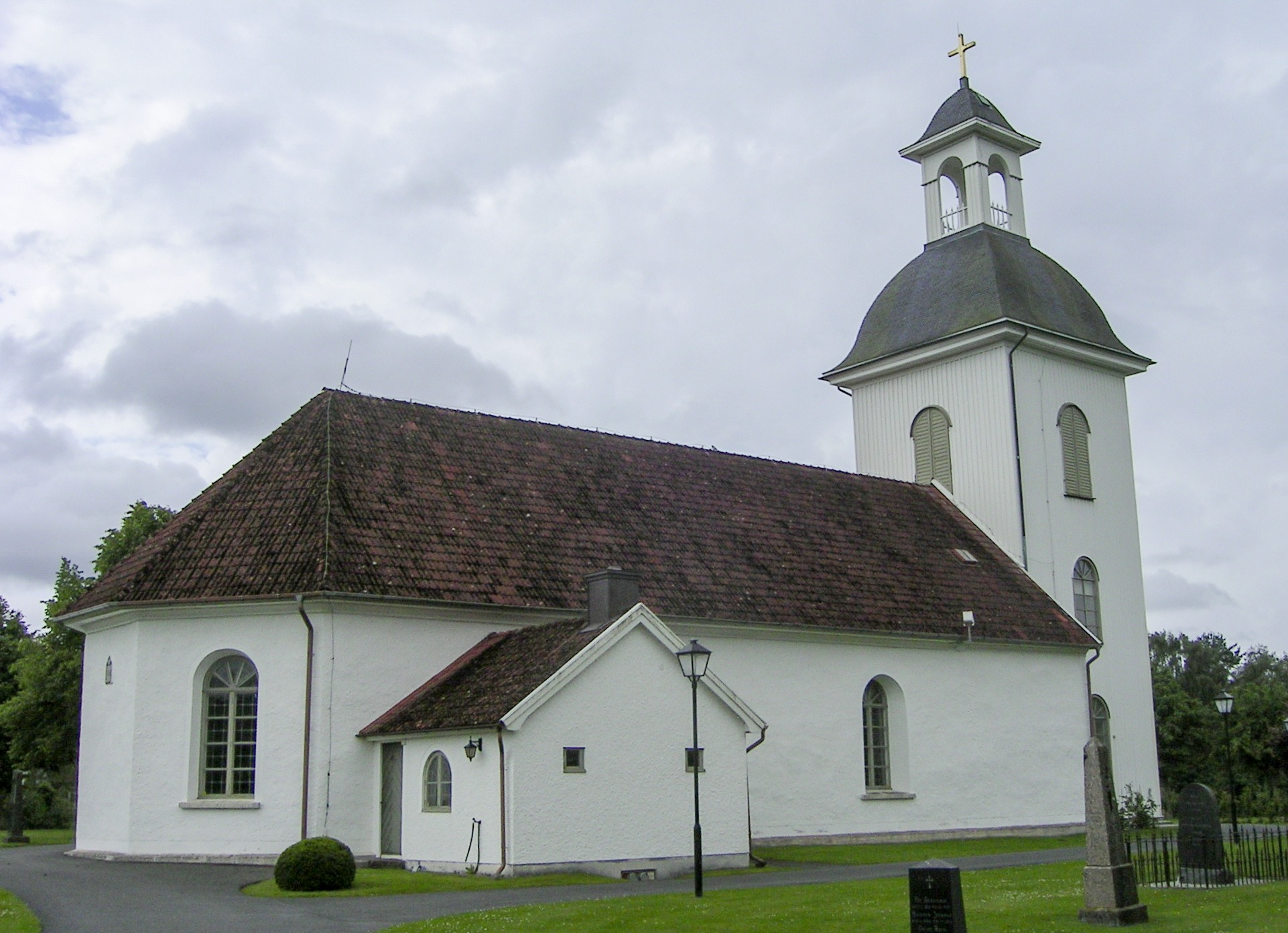

Torestorp is a locality situated in Mark Municipality, Västra Götaland County, Sweden. It had 419 inhabitants in 2010.

== Sports ==
The following sports clubs are located in Torestorp:

- Torestorp/Älekulla FF
- Svansjö Ungdom
