= Torestorp/Älekulla FF =

Swedish football club

- Full name: Torestorp/Älekulla Fotbollförening
- Founded: 2008
- Ground: Äbyvallen; Torestorp; Sweden
- Chairman: Peter Carlsson
- League: Division 4 Västergötland Södra
Home colours

Torestorp/Älekulla FF is a Swedish football club located in Torestorp.

== Background ==
Torestorps IF and Älekulla IF merged in 2008 to form Torestorp/Älekulla FF. The new club took the place of Torestorps IF in Division 5 Västergötland Sydvästra.

Torestorp/Älekulla FF currently plays in Division 4 Västergötland Södra which is the sixth tier of Swedish football. They play their home matches at the Svansjövallen in Torestorp and Äbyvallen in Älekulla.

The club is affiliated to Västergötlands Fotbollförbund.

== Season to season ==
Season	Level	Division	Section	Position	Movements
2004	Tier 5	Division 4	Västergötland Södra	3rd	Torestorps IF
2005	Tier 5	Division 4	Västergötland Södra	6th	Torestorps IF
2006*	Tier 6	Division 4	Västergötland Södra	6th	Torestorps IF
2007	Tier 6	Division 4	Västergötland Södra	11th	Torestorps IF – Relegated
2008	Tier 7	Division 5	Västergötland Sydvästra	1st	Promoted
2009	Tier 6	Division 4	Västergötland Södra	5th	
2010	Tier 6	Division 4	Västergötland Södra	8th	
2011	Tier 6	Division 4	Västergötland Södra		

* League restructuring in 2006 resulted in a new division being created at Tier 3 and subsequent divisions dropping a level.
