= Mamadou Kouyaté =

Malian footballer

Personal information
- Date of birth: 13 September 1997 (age 29)
- Place of birth: Mali
- Position: Midfielder

Team information
- Current team: Gefle IF
- Number: 8

Youth career
- Yeelen Olympique

Senior career*
Years	Team	Apps	(Gls)
2018–2020	AFC Eskilstuna	5	(0)
2019	→ Boden (loan)	12	(1)
2020	→ Luleå (loan)	9	(0)
2021	Luleå	25	(2)
2022–2025	Sandviken	77	(0)
2026–	Gefle	19	(2)
- * Club domestic league appearances and goals as of 16 November 2026

Mamadou Kouyaté (born 13 September 1997) is a Malian footballer who plays for Gefle IF.

== Career ==
=== Club career ===
In March 2018, Kouyaté joined AFC Eskilstuna from Malian club Yeelen Olympique. He made four appearances in the 2018 Superettan, before Eskilstuna were promoted to Allsvenskan for the 2019 season. Kouyaté made his Allsvenskan debut on 21 April 2019 in a 1–3 loss to Hammarby IF, where he was substituted in the 83rd minute for Ivan Bobko.

In July 2019, Kouyaté was loaned to Bodens BK. After returning, he was loaned out again in March 2020, this time to IFK Luleå for the 2020 season. In November 2020, it became clear that Kouyaté was staying with IFK Luleå on a permanent deal and that he had signed a three-year contract with the club.

In December 2021, Kouyaté was signed by Sandvikens IF.
