= Noel Milleskog =

Swedish footballer

Personal information
- Full name: Eric Noel Patrik Milleskog
- Date of birth: 8 May 2002 (age 24)
- Height: 1.78 m (5 ft 10 in)
- Position: Striker

Team information
- Current team: Degerfors (on loan from IK Sirius)
- Number: <--19-->

Youth career
- –2010: Östra Almby Fk
- 2010–2015: Örebro SK
- 2016: IK Sturehov
- 2017–2020: Örebro SK

Senior career*
Years	Team	Apps	(Gls)
2021–2023	Örebro SK	41	(9)
2021	→ Karlslunds IF FK (loan)	8	(6)
2023	Djurgårdens IF	11	(1)
2024–	IK Sirius	52	(10)
2026–	→ Degerfors (loan)	0	(0)

International career
2018	Sweden U17	3	(0)
- * Club domestic league appearances and goals as of 3 September 2026

Eric Noel Patrik Milleskog (born 8 May 2002) is a Swedish footballer who plays as a forward for Degerfors, on loan from IK Sirius.

Örebro refused a bid from IFK Norrköping during the winter of 2023, encompassing 1 million kr to 1.5 million.
