= John Junior Igbarumah =

Nigerian footballer

Personal information
- Date of birth: 13 February 1992 (age 34)
- Place of birth: Nigeria
- Height: 1.65 m (5 ft 5 in)
- Position: Winger

Team information
- Current team: Sogdiana Jizzakh

Youth career
- Dynamos Academy

Senior career*
Years	Team	Apps	(Gls)
2011–2012	Syrianska IF	41	(8)
2017	Sandviken	24	(3)
2018	Carlstad United	28	(17)
2019	IK Sirius	11	(1)
2020	Dalkurd	21	(1)
2021–2024	Sandviken	112	(45)
2025–	Sogdiana Jizzakh	0	(0)
- * Club domestic league appearances and goals as of 25 December 2024

John Junior Igbarumah (born 13 February 1992) is a Nigerian footballer who plays for Uzbekistan Super League club Sogdiana Jizzakh.
