= 1984–85 Preston North End F.C. season =

Preston North End's 1984–1985 season

Preston North End
1984–85 season
- Chairman: Keith W. Leeming
- Manager: Alan Kelly (to 2nd February); Tommy Booth (from 9th February)
- Stadium: Deepdale
- Third Division: 23rd
- FA Cup: Second round
- League Cup: Second round
- Football League Trophy: First Round
- Top goalscorer: League: John Kelly (7); All: Peter Houghton (9)
- Highest home attendance: 6,136 vs. Telford United
- Lowest home attendance: 1,853 vs. Rochdale
- Average home league attendance: 3,794

During the 1984–85 English football season, Preston North End F.C. competed in the Football League Third Division.

== Final league table ==
Pos	Team	Pld	W	D	L	GF	GA	GD	Pts	Promotion or relegation
20	Swansea City	46	12	11	23	53	80	−27	47	
21	Burnley (R)	46	11	13	22	60	73	−13	46	Relegation to the Fourth Division
22	Orient (R)	46	11	13	22	51	76	−25	46	Relegation to the Fourth Division
23	Preston North End (R)	46	13	7	26	51	100	−49	46	Relegation to the Fourth Division
24	Cambridge United (R)	46	4	9	33	37	95	−58	21	Relegation to the Fourth Division

(R) Relegated

== Results ==
Preston North End's score comes first

=== Legend ===
Win	Draw	Loss

=== Football League Third Division ===
Date	Opponent	Venue	Result	Attendance	Scorers
25 August 1984	Doncaster Rovers	H	2-0	3,748	Houston, Wilkins
1 September 1984	Bristol Rovers	A	0-3	5,357	
8 September 1984	Derby County	H	2-1	5,427	Houston, Kelly
15 September 1984	Hull City	A	2-1	7,323	Clark, D Jones
18 September 1984	Cambridge United	A	3-0	2,310	Houston, Houghton, Wilkins
22 September 1984	Rotherham United	H	0-3	5,036	
29 September 1984	Plymouth Argyle	A	4-6	4,258	Clark 2, Kelly 2 (1pen)
2 October 1984	Orient	H	0-1	3,704	
6 October 1984	Lincoln City	A	0-4	1,906	
13 October 1984	Reading	H	0-2	3,675	
20 October 1984	Bolton Wanderers	A	0-4	5,691	
23 October 1984	Bradford City	H	1-4	3,586	Greenwood
27 October 1984	AFC Bournemouth	A	0-2	3,509	
3 November 1984	Burnley	H	3-3	4,995	Greenwood 2, Kelly
6 November 1984	Swansea City	H	3-2	3,205	Clark, Greenwood, Houston
10 November 1984	Millwall	A	0-3	5,680	
24 November 1984	Bristol City	H	3-2	3,912	Houston, M. Jones Naughton
1 December 1984	Gillingham	A	0-4	4,055	
15 December 1984	Brentford	H	1-1	2,809	Gibson
19 December 1984	York City	H	2-4	2,864	Johnson (pen), Rudge
26 December 1984	Walsall	A	1-2	5,856	Greenwood
29 December 1984	Wigan Athletic	A	0-2	4,503	
1 January 1985	Newport County	H	1-1	3,375	Kelly
12 January 1985	Bristol Rovers	H	2-2	3,164	Johnson, Twentyman
2 February 1985	Plymouth Argyle	H	1-2	3,261	Kelly
9 February 1985	Rotherham United	A	0-3	3,645	
23 February 1985	Burnley	A	0-2	4,740	
26 February 1985	Cambridge United	H	3-1	2,653	Brazil, Clark, Farrelly
2 March 1985	AFC Bournemouth	H	2-1	2,991	Farrelly, Johnson
6 March 1985	Bradford City	A	0-3	6,345	
9 March 1985	Bolton Wanderers	H	1-0	5,581	Gibson
13 March 1985	Derby County	A	0-2	8,248	
16 March 1985	Reading	A	0-3	3,053	
23 March 1985	Lincoln City	H	0-1	2,926	
26 March 1985	Doncaster Rovers	A	2-1	2,784	Kelly, Rudge
30 March 1985	Swansea City	A	1-4	2,380	Brazil
6 April 1985	Walsall	H	1-0	3,776	Houghton
8 April 1985	Newport County	A	3-3	2,119	Houghton, McAteer, Twentyman
13 April 1985	Millwall	H	2-1	3,855	Brazil, Houston
20 April 1985	Bristol City	A	0-4	6,937	
23 April 1985	Hull City	H	1-4	4,636	Gibson
27 April 1985	Gillingham	H	0-0	3,190	
30 April 1985	Orient	A	0-0	3,162	
4 May 1985	Brentford	A	1-3	3,476	Houghton
6 May 1985	Wigan Athletic	H	2-5	4,875	Houghton, McAteer (pen)
11 May 1985	York City	A	1-0	4,523	Stevens

=== FA Cup ===
Round	Date	Opponent	Venue	Result	Attendance	Goalscorers
r1	17 November 1984	Bury	H	4-3	5,013	Gray, Johnson (2), Naughton
r2	8 December 1984	Telford United	H	1-4	6,136	Hunter

=== League Cup ===
Round	Date	Opponent	Venue	Result	Attendance	Goalscorers
r1-1	28 August 1984	Tranmere Rovers	A	3-2	2,015	Twentyman, Farrelly, Kelly
r1-2	4 September 1984	Tranmere Rovers	H	2-2 (5-4 aet)	2,557	Wilkins, Houghton
r2-1	25 September 1984	Norwich City	H	3-3	5,361	Houghton (2), Wilkins
r2-2	10 October 1984	Norwich City	A	1-6	13,506	Twentyman

=== Football League Trophy ===
Round	Date	Opponent	Venue	Result	Attendance	Goalscorers
n.r1-1	5 February 1985	Rochdale	A	2-2	1,093	Houston
n.r1-2	19 February 1985	Rochdale	H	0-1	1,853	

== Statistics ==
=== Appearances and goals ===
No.	Pos	Nat	Player	Total		Division Three		FA Cup		EFL Cup		EFL Trophy	
No.	Pos	Nat	Player	Apps	Goals	Apps	Goals	Apps	Goals	Apps	Goals	Apps	Goals
	MF	(England) ENG	Andrew Murphy	7	0	5	0	0	0	1	0	1	0
	DF	(England) ENG	Andy McAteer	38	2	33	2	2	0	2	0	1	0
	DF	(England) ENG	Bob Atkins	14	0	13	0	0	0	0	0	1	0
	FW	(Hong Kong) HKG	Christopher Hunter	7	1	3 + 3	0	0 + 1	1	0	0	0	0
	MF	(England) ENG	Dale Rudge	28	2	23 + 1	2	0	0	3	0	1	0
	FW	(England) ENG	David Johnson	28	5	20 + 4	3	2	2	0	0	2	0
	DF	(England) ENG	David Jones	16	0	13	0	1	0	1	0	1	0
	FW	(England) ENG	Gary Brazil	18	3	17	3	0	0	0	0	1	0
	DF	(England) ENG	Geoff Twentyman Jr.	52	4	44	2	2	0	4	2	2	0
	GK	(England) ENG	Glen Campbell	19	0	17	0	0	0	0	0	2	0
	MF	(Gibraltar) GIB	Graham Houston	39	6	26 + 5	5	2	0	3 + 1	0	1 + 1	1
	FW	(Malta) MLT	Ian Stevens	4	1	3 + 1	1	0	0	0	0	0	0
	MF	(England) ENG	John Kelly	43	8	35 + 2	7	1	0	4	1	1	0
	GK	(England) ENG	John Platt	7	0	7	0	0	0	0	0	0	0
	MF	(Wales) WAL	Jonathan Clark	47	5	39 + 1	5	2	0	3	0	2	0
	DF	(England) ENG	Mark Jones	41	2	35	2	2	0	3	0	1	0
	MF	(England) ENG	Michael Farrelly	46	3	39	2	1	0	4	1	2	0
	FW	(England) ENG	Nigel Greenwood	17	5	11 + 4	5	0	0	1	0	0 + 1	0
	FW	(Republic of Ireland) IRL	Paul McGee	3	0	2	0	1	0	0	0	0	0
	DF	(England) ENG	Paul Welsh	3	0	2 + 1	0	0	0	0	0	0	0
	FW	(England) ENG	Paul Wilkins	9	4	3 + 3	2	0	0	2 + 1	2	0	0
	FW	(England) ENG	Peter Houghton	28	9	22 + 2	6	0	0	2 + 2	3	0	0
	GK	(England) ENG	Peter Litchfield	24	0	18	0	2	0	4	0	0	0
	DF	(England) ENG	Simon Gibson	18	4	17	3	0	0	0	0	1	1
	MF	(England) ENG	Terry Gray	15	1	13	0	2	1	0	0	0	0
	DF	(England) ENG	Tommy Booth	14	0	11	0	0	0	3	0	0	0
	MF	(Scotland) SCO	Willie Naughton	41	2	31 + 2	1	2	1	4	0	2	0
Player(s) who featured whilst on loan but returned to parent club during the season:
	GK	(England) ENG	Jeffrey Wealands	4	0	4	0	0	0	0	0	0	0

== Awards and Nominations ==
=== Club Awards ===
Award	Player	Notes	Ref.
Player of the Year	(England) Jonathan Clark		
