= 1981–82 Preston North End F.C. season =

Preston North End's 1981–1982 season

Preston North End F.C.
1981–82 season
- Chairman: Alan R.W. Jones JP FRICS
- Manager: Tommy Docherty (until 4th December); Gordon Lee (from 9th December)
- Stadium: Deepdale
- Third Division: 14th
- FA Cup: First round
- League Cup: Second round
- Top goalscorer: League: Alex Bruce (18); All: Alex Bruce (19)
- Highest home attendance: 7,815 vs. Carlisle United
- Lowest home attendance: 4,171 vs. Brentford
- Average home league attendance: 5,494

During the 1981–82 English football season, Preston North End F.C. competed in the Football League Third Division.

== Final league table ==
Pos	Team	Pld	W	D	L	GF	GA	GD	Pts
12	Reading	46	17	11	18	67	75	−8	62
13	Portsmouth	46	14	19	13	56	51	+5	61
14	Preston North End	46	16	13	17	50	56	−6	61
15	Bristol Rovers	46	18	9	19	58	65	−7	61 (Note: Bristol Rovers had 2 points deducted.)
16	Newport County	46	14	16	16	54	54	0	58

Source: rsssf.com (incorrect), source=11v11.com

== Results ==
Preston North End's score comes first

=== Legend ===
Win	Draw	Loss

=== Football League Third Division ===
Date	Opponent	Venue	Result	Attendance	Scorers
29 August 1981	Millwall	A	1-2	4,549	Walsh
05 September 1981	Portsmouth	H	1-0	6,124	Bruce
12 September 1981	Swindon Town	A	0-4	5,695	
19 September 1981	Gillingham	H	1-1	4,563	Bruce (pen)
22 September 1981	Huddersfield Town	H	1-1	6,497	Naughton
26 September 1981	Newport County	A	1-1	5,064	Doyle
29 September 1981	Doncaster Rovers	A	0-1	7,513	
03 October 1981	Bristol Rovers	H	0-1	4,964	
10 October 1981	Bristol City	A	0-0	5,389	
17 October 1981	Reading	H	0-0	5,671	
20 October 1981	Burnley	H	1-1	7,521	O'Riordan
24 October 1981	Exeter City	A	3-4	3,642	Bruce 2 (1 pen), Doyle
31 October 1981	Southend United	H	1-0	4,487	Poutney (og)
04 November 1981	Lincoln City	A	2-1	3,683	Buckley, Elliott
07 November 1981	Chester City	H	0-1	5,185	
14 November 1981	Wimbledon	A	2-3	2,428	Dunn, Bruce
28 November 1981	Oxford United	A	0-3	3,798	
05 December 1981	Brentford	H	1-3	4,171	Bruce
05 January 1982	Chesterfield	A	0-0	3,969	
16 January 1982	Plymouth Argyle	H	1-0	4,936	Bruce
23 January 1982	Millwall	H	1-0	5,082	Elliott (pen)
30 January 1982	Gillingham	A	2-0	5,379	Naughton, Bruce
02 February 1982	Carlisle United	A	0-1	5,044	
06 February 1982	Swindon Town	H	0-0	5,616	
09 February 1982	Huddersfield Town	A	3-2	6,674	Bruce 2, Elliott
13 February 1982	Bristol Rovers	A	0-2	5,003	
20 February 1982	Doncaster Rovers	H	3-1	5,830	McGee, Bruce, Elliott (pen)
27 February 1982	Bristol City	H	1-3	6,424	Kelly
06 March 1982	Reading	A	1-2	2,655	Elliott
13 March 1982	Exeter City	H	1-0	4,770	Elliott
16 March 1982	Lincoln City	H	1-1	4,885	O'Riordan
19 March 1982	Southend United	A	2-2	3,915	Elliott, Bruce
27 March 1982	Chester City	A	1-0	2,842	Elliott
03 April 1982	Wimbledon	H	3-2	4,964	Bruce 2, O'Riordan
06 April 1982	Portsmouth	A	1-1	6,712	O'Riordan
10 April 1982	Carlisle United	H	0-1	7,815	
13 April 1982	Walsall	A	3-0	3,507	Elliott, Bruce 2
17 April 1982	Brentford	A	0-0	5,627	
20 April 1982	Fulham	H	1-3	6,009	Buckley (pen)
24 April 1982	Oxford United	H	2-2	5,516	Kelly, Doyle
27 April 1982	Walsall	H	1-0	4,926	Kelly
01 May 1982	Plymouth Argyle	A	3-0	3,319	Kelly, Bell, Elliott
04 May 1982	Newport County	H	2-1	4,972	Bruce, Kelly
08 May 1982	Chesterfield	H	2-0	5,445	Naughton, Bruce
11 May 1982	Burnley	A	0-2	13,871	
15 May 1982	Fulham	A	0-3	7,985	

=== FA Cup ===
Round	Date	Opponent	Venue	Result	Attendance	Goalscorers
r1	21 November 1981	Chesterfield	A	1-4	5,435	Doyle

=== League Cup ===
Round	Date	Opponent	Venue	Result	Attendance	Goalscorers
r1-1	01 September 1981	Halifax Town	A	2-1	2,719	Clark, Naughton
r1-2	15 September 1981	Halifax Town	H	0-0	4,090	
r2-1	06 October 1981	Leicester City	H	1-0	5,592	Bruce
r2-2	28 October 1981	Leicester City	A	0-4	7,658	

=== Football League Group Cup ===
Round	Date	Opponent	Venue	Result	Attendance	Goalscorers
prg1	15 August 1981	Blackpool	A	1–2		
prg1	2 August 1980	Burnley	H	0–1		
prg1	22 August 1981	Carlisle United	A	0–3		

== Statistics ==
=== Appearances and goals ===
No.	Pos	Nat	Player	Total		Division Three		FA Cup		EFL Cup	
No.	Pos	Nat	Player	Apps	Goals	Apps	Goals	Apps	Goals	Apps	Goals
	FW	(Scotland) SCO	Alex Bruce	51	19	46	18	1	0	4	1
	DF	(England) ENG	Andy McAteer	45	0	41	0	1	0	3	0
	MF	(England) ENG	Barry Dunn	11	1	8	1	1	0	2	0
	DF	(England) ENG	Brian Taylor	12	0	10 + 2	0	0	0	0	0
	DF	(Republic of Ireland) IRL	Don O'Riordan	51	4	46	4	1	0	4	0
	MF	(England) ENG	Gary Buckley	25	2	20 + 2	2	1	0	2	0
	MF	(England) ENG	Gordon Coleman	19	0	15	0	0	0	4	0
	MF	(England) ENG	Graham Bell	23	1	22	1	0	0	1	0
	MF	(Gibraltar) GIB	Graham Houston	20	0	9 + 9	0	1	0	1	0
			J. Bell	1	0	0	0	0	0	1	0
	DF	(Republic of Ireland) IRL	John Anderson	41	0	35 + 3	0	1	0	2	0
	DF	(Scotland) SCO	John Blackley	4	0	3	0	0	0	1	0
	MF	(England) ENG	John Kelly	30	5	28 + 2	5	0	0	0	0
	MF	(Wales) WAL	Jonathan Clark	23	1	18	0	1	0	4	1
	MF	(England) ENG	Mark Walsh	12	1	4 + 6	1	0	0	1 + 1	0
	GK	(England) ENG	Martin Hodge	28	0	28	0	0	0	0	0
	MF	(England) ENG	Michael Farrelly	9	0	3 + 4	0	0	0	1 + 1	0
	FW	(Republic of Ireland) IRL	Paul McGee	11	1	10	1	0	0	1	0
	GK	(England) ENG	Peter Litchfield	23	0	18	0	1	0	4	0
	MF	(Wales) WAL	Peter Sayer	1	0	1	0	0	0	0	0
	DF	(England) ENG	Simon Westwell	15	0	12	0	0	0	3	0
	MF	(Wales) WAL	Steve Doyle	39	4	36	3	1	1	2	0
	FW	(England) ENG	Steve Elliott	36	10	34 + 1	10	0	0	1	0
	DF	(England) ENG	Tommy Booth	28	0	27	0	0	0	1	0
	MF	(Scotland) SCO	Willie Naughton	35	4	31 + 2	3	1	0	1	1
Player(s) who featured whilst on loan but returned to parent club during the season:
	DF	(England) ENG	Jimmy Mullen	1	0	1	0	0	0	0	0

== Awards and Nominations ==
=== Club Awards ===
Award	Player	Notes	Ref.
Player of the Year	(Republic of Ireland) Don O'Riordan		
