= 1982–83 Preston North End F.C. season =

Preston North End's 1982–1983 season

Preston North End
1982–83 season
- Chairman: Keith W. Leeming
- Manager: Gordon Lee
- Stadium: Deepdale
- Third Division: 16th
- FA Cup: Third round
- League Cup: Second round
- Top goalscorer: League: Steve Elliott (19); All: Steve Elliott (23)
- Highest home attendance: 14,148 vs. Blackpool
- Lowest home attendance: 3,169 vs. Walsall
- Average home league attendance: 4,941

During the 1982–83 English football season, Preston North End F.C. competed in the Football League Third Division.

== Final league table ==
Pos	Team	Pld	W	D	L	GF	GA	GD	Pts
14	Bournemouth	46	16	13	17	59	68	−9	61
15	Southend United	46	15	14	17	66	65	+1	59
16	Preston North End	46	15	13	18	60	69	−9	58
17	Millwall	46	14	13	19	64	77	−13	55
18	Wigan Athletic	46	15	9	22	60	72	−12	54

== Results ==
Preston North End's score comes first

=== Legend ===
Win	Draw	Loss

=== Football League Third Division ===
Date	Opponent	Venue	Result	Attendance	Scorers
28 August 1982	Millwall	H	3-2	4,498	Elliott 3 (1 pen)
04 September 1982	Sheffield United	A	1-2	14,527	Kelly
07 September 1982	Walsall	A	1-2	2,060	McAteer
11 September 1982	Oxford United	H	1-2	4,607	Elliott
18 September 1982	Exeter City	A	1-5	2,310	Elliott (pen)
25 September 1982	Bristol Rovers	H	2-2	3,872	Bell, Elliott
28 September 1982	Wrexham	H	3-0	3,340	O'Riordan, Elliott 2
02 October 1982	Reading	A	3-2	1,943	Elliott 2, Bruce
09 October 1982	Gillingham	A	1-2	4,390	Bruce
16 October 1982	Huddersfield Town	H	0-0	5,570	
19 October 1982	Newport County	H	0-0	3,759	
23 October 1982	Portsmouth	A	1-3	10,331	Bruce
30 October 1982	AFC Bournemouth	H	0-1	3,583	
02 November 1982	Brentford	A	1-3	6,142	Elliott
06 November 1982	Cardiff City	A	1-3	5,546	O'Riordan
13 November 1982	Chesterfield	H	1-1	3,574	Houston
27 November 1982	Plymouth Argyle	H	2-2	3,648	McAteer, Elliott
03 December 1982	Southend United	A	3-2	3,749	Elliott, Houston, Walsh
17 December 1982	Orient	A	1-2	1,668	Coleman
27 December 1982	Bradford City	H	0-0	7,235	
28 December 1982	Doncaster Rovers	A	0-2	3,895	
01 January 1983	Wigan Athletic	H	4-1	7,560	Bruce 2, McAteer, Kelly (pen)
03 January 1983	Lincoln City	A	0-3	5,891	
15 January 1983	Millwall	A	0-1	2,816	
22 January 1983	Exeter City	H	2-2	3,769	Elliott, Bruce
29 January 1983	Oxford United	A	2-3	4,441	Gowling, Naughton
05 February 1983	Wrexham	A	1-3	1,930	Bell
15 February 1983	Newport County	A	0-3	2,317	
19 February 1983	Gillingham	H	0-0	3,475	
26 February 1983	Huddersfield Town	A	1-1	8,562	O'Riordan
01 March 1983	Brentford	H	3-0	3,669	Elliott, Bell, Westwell
05 March 1983	Portsmouth	H	0-0	5,598	
12 March 1983	AFC Bournemouth	A	0-4	4,407	
19 March 1983	Cardiff City	H	2-1	4,608	Bruce, Elliott
26 March 1983	Chesterfield	A	1-1	2,332	O'Riordan
29 March 1983	Walsall	H	1-0	4,013	Sayer
02 April 1983	Doncaster Rovers	H	4-1	5,287	Hinnigan, McAteer, Elliott, Humphries (og)
04 April 1983	Bradford City	A	2-1	4,357	Gowling, McAteer (pen)
08 April 1983	Southend United	H	1-1	6,286	Bell
12 April 1983	Sheffield United	H	1-0	6,302	Houston S (og)
16 April 1983	Bristol Rovers	A	2-3	5,189	Elliott, Hinnigan
23 April 1983	Orient	H	2-1	5,627	Hinnigan, Sayer
30 April 1983	Plymouth Argyle	A	1-1	2,912	Booth
02 May 1983	Lincoln City	H	1-0	6,523	Gowling
07 May 1983	Reading	H	2-0	7,252	Gowling, Elliott
14 May 1983	Wigan Athletic	A	1-0	7,191	Gowling

=== FA Cup ===
Round	Date	Opponent	Venue	Result	Attendance	Goalscorers
r1	20 November 1982	Shepshed Charterhouse	H	5-1	6,200	McAteer, Coleman, Kelly, Elliott (2)
r2	11 December 1982	Blackpool	H	2-1	14,148	O'Riordan, Coleman
r3	08 January 1983	Leeds United	A	0-3	16,816	

=== League Cup ===
Round	Date	Opponent	Venue	Result	Attendance	Goalscorers
r1-1	31 August 1982	Walsall	A	1-0	2,490	Naughton
r1-2	14 September 1982	Walsall	H	1-1	3,169	Elliott
r2-1	06 October 1982	Norwich City	A	1-2	7,273	Bruce
r2-2	26 October 1982	Norwich City	H	1-2	6,082	Elliott

== Statistics ==
=== Appearances and goals ===
No.	Pos	Nat	Player	Total		Division Three		FA Cup		EFL Cup	
No.	Pos	Nat	Player	Apps	Goals	Apps	Goals	Apps	Goals	Apps	Goals
	FW	(England) ENG	Alan Gowling	46	5	37 + 3	5	3	0	3	0
	FW	(Scotland) SCO	Alex Bruce	31	8	22 + 5	7	1	0	3	1
	DF	(England) ENG	Andy McAteer	51	6	44	5	3	1	4	0
	FW	(Hong Kong) HKG	Christopher Hunter	1	0	0 + 1	0	0	0	0	0
	DF	(Republic of Ireland) IRL	Don O'Riordan	46	5	40 + 1	4	3	1	2	0
	MF	(England) ENG	Gary Buckley	12	0	7 + 5	0	0	0	0	0
	GK	(England) ENG	Glen Campbell	1	0	1	0	0	0	0	0
	MF	(England) ENG	Gordon Coleman	21	3	15 + 3	1	2	2	1	0
	MF	(England) ENG	Graham Bell	45	4	39 + 1	4	0 + 1	0	4	0
	MF	(Gibraltar) GIB	Graham Houston	24	2	15 + 5	2	3	0	1	0
	DF	(England) ENG	John Hinnigan	13	3	13	3	0	0	0	0
	MF	(England) ENG	John Kelly	35	3	23 + 6	2	2	1	4	0
	MF	(Wales) WAL	Jonathan Clark	4	0	3	0	0	0	1	0
	MF	(England) ENG	Mark Walsh	33	1	27	1	2	0	4	0
	MF	(England) ENG	Michael Farrelly	6	0	4 + 1	0	0	0	1	0
	MF	(England) ENG	Paul Lodge	19	0	19	0	0	0	0	0
	GK	(England) ENG	Peter Litchfield	30	0	23	0	3	0	4	0
	MF	(Wales) WAL	Peter Sayer	23	2	21	2	2	0	0	0
	DF	(England) ENG	Simon Westwell	37	1	31	1	2	0	4	0
	FW	(England) ENG	Steve Elliott	52	23	45	19	3	2	4	2
	DF	(England) ENG	Tommy Booth	16	1	15	1	1	0	0	0
	MF	(Scotland) SCO	Willie Naughton	48	2	40 + 1	1	3	0	4	1
Player(s) who featured whilst on loan but returned to parent club during the season:
	GK	(England) ENG	James Arnold	6	0	6	0	0	0	0	0
	GK	(England) ENG	Martin Hodge	16	0	16	0	0	0	0	0

== Awards and Nominations ==
=== Club Awards ===
Award	Player	Notes	Ref.
Player of the Year	(England) Steve Elliott		
