= 1983–84 Preston North End F.C. season =

Preston North End's 1983–1984 season

Preston North End
1983–84 season
- Chairman: Keith W. Leeming
- Manager: Gordon Lee (until 20th December); Alan Kelly (from 21st December)
- Stadium: Deepdale
- Third Division: 16th
- FA Cup: First round
- League Cup: Third round
- Football League Trophy: Northern Quarter Finals
- Top goalscorer: League: Steve Elliott (16); All: Steve Elliott (20)
- Highest home attendance: 11,060 vs. Sheffield Wednesday
- Lowest home attendance: 3,114 vs. Orient
- Average home league attendance: 4,553

During the 1983–84 English football season, Preston North End F.C. competed in the Football League Third Division.

== Final league table ==
| Pos | Team | Pld | W | D | L | GF | GA | GD | Pts |
|---|---|---|---|---|---|---|---|---|---|
| 14 | Lincoln City | 46 | 17 | 10 | 19 | 59 | 62 | −3 | 61 |
| 15 | Wigan Athletic | 46 | 16 | 13 | 17 | 46 | 56 | −10 | 61 |
| 16 | Preston North End | 46 | 15 | 11 | 20 | 66 | 66 | 0 | 56 |
| 17 | Bournemouth | 46 | 16 | 7 | 23 | 63 | 73 | −10 | 55 |
| 18 | Rotherham United | 46 | 15 | 9 | 22 | 57 | 64 | −7 | 54 |

== Results ==
Preston North End's score comes first

=== Legend ===
| Win | Draw | Loss |

=== Football League Third Division ===
| Date | Opponent | Venue | Result | Attendance | Scorers |
|---|---|---|---|---|---|
| 27 August 1983 | AFC Bournemouth | A | 1-0 | 4,163 | Houston |
| 3 September 1983 | Brentford | H | 3-3 | 3,799 | Kelly 2, Sayer |
| 6 September 1983 | Southend United | H | 4-1 | 3,967 | Sayer, Kelly, Elliott 2 |
| 10 September 1983 | Sheffield United | A | 1-1 | 12,441 | Sayer |
| 17 September 1983 | Hull City | H | 0-0 | 6,661 | |
| 24 September 1983 | Plymouth Argyle | A | 0-1 | 3,674 | |
| 27 September 1983 | Newport County | A | 1-1 | 2,542 | Elliott (pen) |
| 1 October 1983 | Oxford United | H | 1-2 | 4,668 | Sayer |
| 8 October 1983 | Gillingham | A | 0-2 | 3,725 | |
| 15 October 1983 | Wigan Athletic | H | 2-3 | 6,622 | Elliott (pen), Hinnigan |
| 18 October 1983 | Wimbledon | H | 2-3 | 3,517 | Elliott 2 |
| 21 October 1983 | Millwall | A | 0-1 | 5,243 | |
| 29 October 1983 | Lincoln City | H | 1-2 | 4,440 | Clark |
| 1 November 1983 | Bristol Rovers | A | 1-3 | 5,635 | Farrelly |
| 5 November 1983 | Burnley | A | 1-2 | 7,915 | Houghton |
| 12 November 1983 | Rotherham United | H | 1-0 | 3,926 | Hinnigan |
| 26 November 1983 | Exeter City | H | 2-1 | 3,474 | Kelly 2 |
| 3 December 1983 | Orient | A | 1-2 | 2,679 | D Jones |
| 17 December 1983 | Bolton Wanderers | A | 2-2 | 6,275 | Houghton, Farnworth (og) |
| 26 December 1983 | Port Vale | H | 4-0 | 5,599 | Houghton 2, Elliott, Kelly |
| 27 December 1983 | Scunthorpe United | A | 5-1 | 3,986 | Elliott 3, Houghton, Kelly |
| 31 December 1983 | Walsall | H | 0-1 | 6,204 | |
| 2 January 1984 | Bradford City | A | 2-3 | 6,407 | Naughton, Kelly |
| 14 January 1984 | AFC Bournemouth | H | 2-0 | 3,512 | Houghton, Clark (pen) |
| 31 January 1984 | Sheffield United | H | 2-2 | 5,028 | Farrelly, Walsh |
| 4 February 1984 | Oxford United | A | 0-2 | 9,105 | |
| 11 February 1984 | Plymouth Argyle | H | 2-1 | 4,370 | Twentyman, Naughton |
| 14 February 1984 | Bristol Rovers | H | 1-0 | 3,719 | Clark |
| 18 February 1984 | Lincoln City | A | 1-2 | 2,780 | Naughton |
| 25 February 1984 | Millwall | H | 0-0 | 4,109 | |
| 3 March 1984 | Wimbledon | A | 2-2 | 2,524 | Booth, Hinnigan |
| 6 March 1984 | Burnley | H | 4-2 | 8,812 | Elliott, Kelly, Hinnigan, Houghton |
| 10 March 1984 | Rotherham United | A | 1-0 | 3,256 | Hinnigan |
| 17 March 1984 | Gillingham | H | 2-2 | 3,874 | Twentyman, Elliott |
| 24 March 1984 | Wigan Athletic | A | 0-1 | 4,470 | |
| 30 March 1984 | Newport County | H | 2-0 | 3,537 | Elliott, Kelly |
| 3 April 1984 | Brentford | A | 1-4 | 3,446 | Houston |
| 6 April 1984 | Southend United | A | 1-1 | 1,826 | Kelly |
| 10 April 1984 | Hull City | A | 0-3 | 8,134 | |
| 14 April 1984 | Orient | H | 3-1 | 3,144 | Houghton, Kelly, Houston |
| 21 April 1984 | Port Vale | A | 1-1 | 3,574 | Houghton |
| 24 April 1984 | Scunthorpe United | H | 1-0 | 3,413 | Elliott |
| 28 April 1984 | Exeter City | A | 1-2 | 2,005 | Elliott |
| 5 May 1984 | Bradford City | H | 1-2 | 3,242 | Clark (pen) |
| 7 May 1984 | Walsall | A | 1-2 | 3,273 | Kelly |
| 12 May 1984 | Bolton Wanderers | H | 2-1 | 5,077 | Clark, Elliott |

=== FA Cup ===
| Round | Date | Opponent | Venue | Result | Attendance | Goalscorers |
|---|---|---|---|---|---|---|
| r1 | 19 November 1983 | Scunthorpe United | A | 0-1 | 3,484 | |

=== League Cup ===
| Round | Date | Opponent | Venue | Result | Attendance | Goalscorers |
|---|---|---|---|---|---|---|
| r1-1 | 30 August 1983 | Tranmere Rovers | H | 1-0 | 3,210 | Kelly |
| r1-2 | 12 September 1983 | Tranmere Rovers | A | 0-0 | 2,986 | |
| r2-1 | 4 October 1983 | Wolverhampton Wanderers | A | 3-2 | 7,790 | Hinnigan (2), Naughton |
| r2-2 | 25 October 1983 | Wolverhampton Wanderers | H | 1-0 | 8,857 | Elliott |
| r3 | 8 November 1983 | Sheffield Wednesday | H | 0-2 | 11,060 | |

=== Football League Trophy ===
| Round | Date | Opponent | Venue | Result | Attendance | Goalscorers |
|---|---|---|---|---|---|---|
| n.r1 | 22 February 1984 | Rochdale | A | 3-0 | 1,300 | Elliott (3) |
| n.r2 | 13 March 1984 | Doncaster Rovers | A | 1-2 | 2,098 | Naughton |
| n.qf | 20 March 1984 | Hull City | A | 0-3 | 4,377 | |

== Statistics ==
=== Appearances and goals ===
| No. | Pos | Nat | Player | Total | | Division Three | | FA Cup | | EFL Cup | | EFL Trophy | |
| No. | Pos | Nat | Player | Apps | Goals | Apps | Goals | Apps | Goals | Apps | Goals | Apps | Goals |
|---|---|---|---|---|---|---|---|---|---|---|---|---|---|
| | MF | (England) ENG | Andrew Murphy | 6 | 0 | 4 + 1 | 0 | 0 | 0 | 0 | 0 | 0 + 1 | 0 |
| | DF | (England) ENG | Andy McAteer | 43 | 0 | 32 + 2 | 0 | 1 | 0 | 5 | 0 | 3 | 0 |
| | MF | (England) ENG | David Bleasdale | 7 | 0 | 4 + 1 | 0 | 0 | 0 | 1 | 0 | 1 | 0 |
| | DF | (England) ENG | David Jones | 46 | 1 | 37 | 1 | 1 | 0 | 5 | 0 | 3 | 0 |
| | DF | (England) ENG | Geoff Twentyman Jr. | 35 | 2 | 25 + 3 | 2 | 0 + 1 | 0 | 3 | 0 | 2 + 1 | 0 |
| | MF | (England) ENG | George Telfer | 2 | 0 | 0 + 2 | 0 | 0 | 0 | 0 | 0 | 0 | 0 |
| | MF | (Gibraltar) GIB | Graham Houston | 48 | 3 | 23 + 18 | 3 | 0 | 0 | 4 | 0 | 1 + 2 | 0 |
| | DF | (England) ENG | John Hinnigan | 46 | 7 | 38 + 1 | 5 | 1 | 0 | 3 | 2 | 3 | 0 |
| | MF | (England) ENG | John Kelly | 40 | 14 | 34 | 13 | 1 | 0 | 3 | 1 | 2 | 0 |
| | MF | (Wales) WAL | Jonathan Clark | 36 | 5 | 31 | 5 | 1 | 0 | 3 | 0 | 1 | 0 |
| | DF | (England) ENG | Mark Jones | 4 | 0 | 4 | 0 | 0 | 0 | 0 | 0 | 0 | 0 |
| | MF | (England) ENG | Mark Walsh | 29 | 1 | 25 | 1 | 0 | 0 | 2 | 0 | 2 | 0 |
| | MF | (England) ENG | Michael Farrelly | 33 | 2 | 31 | 2 | 0 | 0 | 0 | 0 | 2 | 0 |
| | MF | (England) ENG | Paul Lodge | 25 | 0 | 17 + 2 | 0 | 1 | 0 | 5 | 0 | 0 | 0 |
| | FW | (England) ENG | Peter Houghton | 38 | 9 | 31 + 2 | 9 | 1 | 0 | 1 | 0 | 2 + 1 | 0 |
| | GK | (England) ENG | Peter Litchfield | 54 | 0 | 45 | 0 | 1 | 0 | 5 | 0 | 3 | 0 |
| | MF | (Wales) WAL | Peter Sayer | 21 | 4 | 15 | 4 | 0 | 0 | 3 + 1 | 0 | 1 + 1 | 0 |
| | FW | (England) ENG | Steve Elliott | 53 | 20 | 44 | 16 | 1 | 0 | 5 | 1 | 3 | 3 |
| | GK | (England) ENG | Stuart Cameron | 1 | 0 | 1 | 0 | 0 | 0 | 0 | 0 | 0 | 0 |
| | DF | (England) ENG | Tommy Booth | 37 | 1 | 31 | 1 | 1 | 0 | 4 | 0 | 1 | 0 |
| | MF | (Scotland) SCO | Willie Naughton | 48 | 5 | 34 + 7 | 3 | 1 | 0 | 3 | 1 | 3 | 1 |

== Awards and Nominations ==
=== Club Awards ===
| Award | Player | Notes | Ref. |
|---|---|---|---|
| Player of the Year | (England) Peter Litchfield | | |
