= 1985–86 Preston North End F.C. season =

Preston North End's 1985–1986 season

Preston North End F.C.
1985–86 season
- Chairman: Keith W. Leeming
- Manager: Tommy Booth (until 5th December); Brian Kidd (21st March); Jonathan Clark (until 3rd May)
- Stadium: Deepdale
- Fourth Division: 23rd
- FA Cup: First round
- League Cup: Second round
- Football League Trophy: Group Stage
- Top goalscorer: League: John Thomas (17); All: John Thomas (18); Gary Brazil (18)
- Highest home attendance: 5,585 vs. Burnley
- Lowest home attendance: 768 vs. Bury
- Average home league attendance: 3, 500

During the 1985–86 English football season, Preston North End F.C. competed in the Football League Fourth Division.

== Final league table ==
Pos	Team	Pld	W	D	L	GF	GA	GD	Pts	Promotion or relegation
20	Halifax Town	46	14	12	20	60	71	−11	54	
21	Exeter City	46	13	15	18	47	59	−12	54	Re-elected
22	Cambridge United	46	15	9	22	65	80	−15	54	Re-elected
23	Preston North End	46	11	10	25	54	89	−35	43	Re-elected
24	Torquay United	46	9	10	27	43	88	−45	37	Re-elected

== Results ==
Preston North End's score comes first

=== Legend ===
Win	Draw	Loss

=== Football League Fourth Division ===
Date	Opponent	Venue	Result	Attendance	Scorers
17 August 1985	Peterborough United	H	2-4	3,177	Brazil, Thomas
26 August 1985	Tranmere Rovers	H	2-2	4,206	Brazil, Thomas
30 August 1985	Halifax Town	A	1-2	2,011	Greenwood
07 September 1985	Torquay United	H	4-0	3,403	Brazil 2, Greenwood 2
10 September 1985	Northampton Town	A	0-6	2,171	
13 September 1985	Stockport County	H	1-2	3,436	Thomas
17 September 1985	Burnley	H	1-0	5,585	Thomas
28 September 1985	Hereford United	H	2-0	3,397	Greenwood, Brazil
02 October 1985	Cambridge United	A	0-2	1,500	
05 October 1985	Crewe Alexandra	A	3-3	2,454	Brazil, Simon Gibson, Greenwood
12 October 1985	Chester City	H	3-6	4,073	Foster, Welsh, Brazil
19 October 1985	Rochdale	A	1-1	2,527	Brazil
22 October 1985	Hartlepool United	H	2-1	3,538	Greenwood, Foster
25 October 1985	Southend United	A	1-2	2,787	Greenwood
02 November 1985	Port Vale	H	0-1	4,531	
05 November 1985	Scunthorpe United	H	0-1	2,007	
09 November 1985	Orient	A	0-2	2,805	
23 November 1985	Colchester United	H	3-2	2,793	Thomas, Gray, Stevens
30 November 1985	Exeter City	A	0-3	1,896	
07 December 1985	Swindon Town	A	1-4	3,945	Allatt
14 December 1985	Aldershot	H	1-3	2,746	Thomas
21 December 1985	Northampton Town	H	1-1	2,570	Thomas
26 December 1985	Wrexham	A	1-1	2,217	Atkins
01 January 1986	Mansfield Town	H	0-2	3,705	
04 January 1986	Port Vale	A	1-0	3,592	Jones
11 January 1986	Halifax Town	H	0-1	3,184	
18 January 1986	Peterborough United	A	1-1	2,711	Allatt
24 January 1986	Stockport County	A	1-2	3,035	Thomas
01 February 1986	Torquay United	A	0-1	1,215	
05 February 1986	Hartlepool United	A	0-1	3,102	
08 February 1986	Rochdale	H	1-1	3,266	Greenwood
22 February 1986	Swindon Town	H	0-3	3,361	
01 March 1986	Hereford United	A	1-1	1,857	Brazil
08 March 1986	Crewe Alexandra	H	1-2	2,922	Thomas
15 March 1986	Chester City	A	0-2	3,062	
18 March 1986	Cambridge United	H	1-2	2,840	Brazil
22 March 1986	Southend United	H	3-2	2,623	Brazil, Thomas 2
25 March 1986	Tranmere Rovers	A	3-2	1,574	Brazil, Thomas 2
29 March 1986	Mansfield Town	A	3-2	3,733	Foster, Atkins, Allatt
31 March 1986	Wrexham	H	1-0	5,163	Thomas
04 April 1986	Scunthorpe United	A	3-1	2,261	Thomas 2, Greenwood
12 April 1986	Orient	H	1-3	4,750	Brazil
18 April 1986	Colchester United	A	0-4	2,046	
22 April 1986	Burnley	A	1-1	3,787	Brazil
26 April 1986	Exeter City	H	2-2	3,132	Thomas, Simon Gibson
03 May 1986	Aldershot	A	0-4	1,866	

=== FA Cup ===
Round	Date	Opponent	Venue	Result	Attendance	Goalscorers
r1	16 November 1985	Walsall	A	3-7	4,035	Martin, Thomas, Brazil

=== League Cup ===
Round	Date	Opponent	Venue	Result	Attendance	Goalscorers
r1-1	20 August 1985	Blackpool	H	2-1	4,704	Keen, Foster
r1-2	03 September 1985	Blackpool	A	3-1	5,043	Twentyman, Rudge, Brazil
r2-1	30 September 1985	Norwich City	H	1-1	4,330	Brazil
r2-2	09 October 1985	Norwich City	A	1-2	11,537	Brazil

=== Football League Trophy ===
Round	Date	Opponent	Venue	Result	Attendance	Goalscorers
n.r1g5	20 January 1986	Tranmere Rovers	A	0-2	1,047	
n.r1g5	29 January 1986	Bury	H	2-0	768	Greenwood, Allatt

== Statistics ==
=== Appearances and goals ===
No.	Pos	Nat	Player	Total		Division Four		FA Cup		EFL Cup		EFL Trophy	
No.	Pos	Nat	Player	Apps	Goals	Apps	Goals	Apps	Goals	Apps	Goals	Apps	Goals
	GK	(Republic of Ireland) IRL	Alan Kelly Jr.	13	0	13	0	0	0	0	0	0	0
	MF	(England) ENG	Andy Pilling	1	0	1	0	0	0	0	0	0	0
	DF	(England) ENG	Andy McAteer	32	0	29	0	0	0	2	0	1	0
	DF	(England) ENG	Bob Atkins	41	2	34	2	1	0	4	0	2	0
	DF	(Scotland) SCO	Bobby McNeil	20	0	19	0	0	0	0	0	1	0
	MF	(England) ENG	Brian Chippendale	6	0	5 + 1	0	0	0	0	0	0	0
			R.C. Cooper	5	0	3 + 2	0	0	0	0	0	0	0
	MF	(England) ENG	Dale Rudge	27	1	23	0	1	0	2	1	1	0
	MF	(England) ENG	Daniel Ibbotson	1	0	1	0	0	0	0	0	0	0
	FW	(England) ENG	Gary Brazil	49	18	43	14	1	1	4	3	1	0
	DF	(England) ENG	Geoff Twentyman Jr.	31	1	26	0	1	0	4	1	0	0
	MF	(Gibraltar) GIB	Graham Houston	2	0	0	0	0	0	0	0	2	0
	FW	(Malta) MLT	Ian Stevens	8	1	6 + 1	1	0	0	0	0	1	0
	GK	(England) ENG	John Platt	38	0	31	0	1	0	4	0	2	0
	FW	(England) ENG	John Thomas	46	18	34 + 6	17	1	1	4	0	1	0
	MF	(Wales) WAL	Jonathan Clark	8	0	6	0	0	0	2	0	0	0
	DF	(England) ENG	Mark Jones	43	1	37	1	1	0	4	0	1	0
	MF	(England) ENG	Mark Rodgers	1	0	1	0	0	0	0	0	0	0
	MF	(England) ENG	Mel Tottoh	1	0	0 + 1	0	0	0	0	0	0	0
	MF	(Republic of Ireland) IRL	Mick Martin	36	1	35	0	1	1	0	0	0	0
	FW	(England) ENG	Nigel Greenwood	36	10	25 +5	9	0 + 1	0	1 + 3	0	1	1
	FW	(England) ENG	Nigel Jemson	1	0	0 + 1	0	0	0	0	0	0	0
	MF	(England) ENG	Nigel Keen	28	1	24	0	0	0	3	1	1	0
	DF	(England) ENG	Paul Welsh	21	1	11 + 6	1	0	0	2	0	2	0
	DF	(England) ENG	Simon Gibson	31	2	25	2	1	0	3	0	2	0
	MF	(England) ENG	Terry Gray	30	1	27	1	0	0	2	0	1	0
	FW	(England) ENG	Vernon Allatt	20	4	17 + 2	3	1	0	0	0	0	1
	FW	(England) ENG	Wayne Foster	37	4	25 + 6	3	1	0	3	1	1+ 1	0
Player(s) who featured whilst on loan but returned to parent club during the season:
	GK	(Wales) WAL	Phillip Harrington	2	0	2	0	0	0	0	0	0	0
	MF	(England) ENG	Shaun Reid	3	0	3	0	0	0	0	0	0	0

== Awards and Nominations ==
=== Club Awards ===
Award	Player	Notes	Ref.
Player of the Year	(England) John Thomas		
