= 1988–89 Preston North End F.C. season =

Preston North End's 1988–1989 season

Preston North End
1988–89 season
- Chairman: Keith W. Leeming
- Manager: John McGrath
- Stadium: Deepdale
- Third Division: 6th
- FA Cup: First round
- League Cup: Second round
- Football League Trophy: First Round
- Top goalscorer: League: Tony Ellis (20); All: Tony Ellis (20)
- Highest home attendance: 14,126 vs Wolverhampton Wanderers
- Lowest home attendance: 2,290 vs Bury
- Average home league attendance: 7,702

During the 1988–89 English football season, Preston North End F.C. competed in the Football League Third Division.

== Final league table ==
Pos	Team	Pld	W	D	L	GF	GA	GD	Pts	Promotion or relegation
4	Fulham	46	22	9	15	69	67	+2	75	Qualification for the Third Division play-offs
5	Bristol Rovers	46	19	17	10	67	51	+16	74	Qualification for the Third Division play-offs
6	Preston North End	46	19	15	12	79	60	+19	72	Qualification for the Third Division play-offs
7	Brentford	46	18	14	14	66	61	+5	68	
8	Chester City	46	19	11	16	64	61	+3	68	

== Results ==
Preston North End's score comes first

=== Legend ===
Win	Draw	Loss

=== Football League Third Division ===
Date	Opponent	Venue	Result	Attendance	Scorers
27 August 1988	Port Vale	H	1-3	6,718	Williams N
03 September 1988	Huddersfield Town	A	0-2	5,622	
10 September 1988	Blackpool	H	1-0	8,779	Patterson
17 September 1988	Bristol City	A	1-1	7,913	Rathbone
20 September 1988	Chester City	H	3-3	5,416	Patterson 2, Ellis
24 September 1988	Notts County	A	0-0	4,965	
01 October 1988	Southend United	H	3-2	5,348	McAteer, Brazil 2
05 October 1988	Bristol Rovers	A	0-1	3,689	
08 October 1988	Bury	H	1-0	5,863	Ellis
15 October 1988	Chesterfield	A	3-0	2,813	Swann, Mooney, Ellis
22 October 1988	Brentford	A	2-0	5,584	Brazil 2
25 October 1988	Gillingham	H	5-0	6,390	Brazil 3, Ellis, Joyce
29 October 1988	Swansea City	A	1-1	5,370	Ellis
05 November 1988	Mansfield Town	H	2-0	6,434	Mooney, Rathbone
08 November 1988	Wigan Athletic	H	2-2	8,396	Brazil, Patterson
12 November 1988	Reading	A	2-2	6,225	Ellis, Patterson
26 November 1988	Wolverhampton Wanderers	A	0-6	13,180	
03 December 1988	Cardiff City	H	3-3	4,963	Brazil, Ellis 2
17 December 1988	Fulham	A	1-2	3,858	Patterson
26 December 1988	Bolton Wanderers	H	3-1	12,104	Hughes, Ellis, Joyce
31 December 1988	Sheffield United	H	2-0	11,005	Patterson, Joyce
02 January 1989	Northampton Town	A	0-1	4,219	
07 January 1989	Aldershot	A	1-2	2,135	Joyce
14 January 1989	Huddersfield Town	H	1-0	6,959	Patterson
21 January 1989	Blackpool	A	0-1	8,951	
28 January 1989	Bristol City	H	2-0	6,080	Mooney 2
03 February 1989	Southend United	A	1-2	2,948	Mooney
11 February 1989	Bristol Rovers	H	1-1	7,365	Mooney
18 February 1989	Bury	A	1-1	6,977	Williams N
25 February 1989	Chesterfield	H	6-0	7,074	Philliskirk 2, Bloomer (og), Patterson, Ellis 2
28 February 1989	Gillingham	A	3-1	3,031	Patterson, Ellis 2
04 March 1989	Brentford	H	5-3	8,186	Philliskirk, Patterson, Joyce 2, Ellis
11 March 1989	Mansfield Town	A	3-0	4,706	Coleman (og), Philliskirk, Ellis
14 March 1989	Swansea City	H	1-1	8,975	James (og)
18 March 1989	Port Vale	A	1-1	8,584	Ellis
25 March 1989	Northampton Town	H	3-2	9,137	Joyce 2, Patterson
27 March 1989	Bolton Wanderers	A	0-1	10,281	
01 April 1989	Fulham	H	1-4	8,190	Philliskirk
04 April 1989	Aldershot	H	2-2	5,977	Bogie, Philliskirk
08 April 1989	Sheffield United	A	1-3	12,718	Stancliffe (og)
15 April 1989	Notts County	H	3-0	6,735	Swann, Joyce, Ellis
22 April 1989	Chester City	A	1-0	4,617	Jemson
29 April 1989	Reading	H	2-1	7,003	Patterson 2
01 May 1989	Wigan Athletic	A	1-1	5,671	Jemson
05 May 1989	Cardiff City	A	0-0	3,196	
13 May 1989	Wolverhampton Wanderers	H	3-3	14,126	Ellis 2, Patterson

=== Football League Playoffs ===
Round	Date	Opponent	Venue	Result	Attendance	Goalscorers
sf-1	22 May 1989	Port Vale	H	1-1	14,321	Jemson
sf-2	25 May 1989	Port Vale	A	1-3	13,416	Patterson

=== FA Cup ===
Round	Date	Opponent	Venue	Result	Attendance	Goalscorers
r1	19 November 1988	Tranmere Rovers	H	1-1	7,734	Atkins
r1r	22 November 1988	Tranmere Rovers	A	0-3	7,676	

=== League Cup ===
Round	Date	Opponent	Venue	Result	Attendance	Goalscorers
r1-1	29 August 1988	Wigan Athletic	A	0-0	4,035	
r1-2	06 September 1988	Wigan Athletic	H	1-0	4,945	Brazil
r2-1	28 September 1988	Norwich City	A	0-2	7,484	
r2-2	11 October 1988	Norwich City	H	0-3	7,002	

=== Football League Trophy ===
Round	Date	Opponent	Venue	Result	Attendance	Goalscorers
n.prg6	06 December 1988	Bolton Wanderers	A	0-1	2,690	
n.prg6	13 December 1988	Bury	H	4-0	2,900	Mooney, Joyce, Patterson, Brazil
n.r1	17 January 1989	Bolton Wanderers	H	0-1	5,569	

== Statistics ==
=== Appearances and goals ===
No.	Pos	Nat	Player	Total		Division Three		FA Cup		EFL Cup		EFL Trophy	
No.	Pos	Nat	Player	Apps	Goals	Apps	Goals	Apps	Goals	Apps	Goals	Apps	Goals
	DF	(England) ENG	Adrian Hughes	27	1	22 + 1	1	0	0	1	0	3	0
	DF	(England) ENG	Alexander Jones	37	0	29 + 1	0	0	0	3 + 1	0	3	0
	DF	(England) ENG	Andy McAteer	19	1	11 + 2	1	0 + 1	0	3	0	2	0
	DF	(England) ENG	Bob Atkins	46	1	39	0	2	1	4	0	1	0
	MF	(Republic of Ireland) IRL	Brian Mooney	48	7	38 + 2	6	2	0	2 + 1	0	2 + 1	1
	GK	(England) ENG	David Brown	29	0	23	0	2	0	4	0	0	0
	DF	(England) ENG	David Miller	14	0	9 + 3	0	0	0	2	0	0	0
	FW	(England) ENG	Gary Brazil	33	11	23 + 2	9	2	0	3	1	3	1
	MF	(England) ENG	Gary Swann	24	2	16 + 2	2	0	0	3 + 1	0	2	0
	MF	(England) ENG	Ian Bogie	13	1	9 + 4	1	0	0	0	0	0	0
	DF	(England) ENG	Jeff Wrightson	42	0	36 + 2	0	2	0	1	0	1	0
	MF	(England) ENG	Mark Patterson	51	16	42	15	2	0	4	0	3	1
	DF	(England) ENG	Mick Rathbone	42	2	32 + 2	2	2	0	4	0	1 + 1	0
	DF	(England) ENG	Neil Williams	48	2	40 + 1	2	2	0	1 + 1	0	3	0
	FW	(England) ENG	Nigel Jemson	9	2	6 + 3	2	0	0	0	0	0	0
	MF	(England) ENG	Oshor Williams	1	0	0	0	0	0	1	0	0	0
	MF	(England) ENG	Paul Fitzpatrick	2	0	2	0	0	0	0	0	0	0
	GK	(England) ENG	Roy Tunks	26	0	23	0	0	0	0	0	3	0
	DF	(England) ENG	Sam Allardyce	21	0	13 + 1	0	2	0	3	0	1 + 1	0
	MF	(England) ENG	Steve Harper	5	0	2 + 3	0	0	0	0	0	0	0
	FW	(England) ENG	Tony Ellis	52	20	43 + 2	20	2	0	3	0	2	0
	FW	(England) ENG	Tony Philliskirk	14	6	13 + 1	6	0	0	0	0	0	0
	MF	(England) ENG	Warren Joyce	47	10	35 + 5	9	2	0	2	0	3	1

== Awards and Nominations ==
=== Club Awards ===
Award	Player	Notes	Ref.
Player of the Year	(Republic of Ireland) Brian Mooney		
