= 1987–88 Preston North End F.C. season =

Preston North End's 1987–1988 season

Preston North End
1987–88 season
- Chairman: Keith W. Leeming
- Manager: John McGrath
- Stadium: Deepdale
- Third Division: 16th
- FA Cup: First round
- League Cup: First round
- Football League Trophy: Northern Final
- Top goalscorer: League: Gary Brazil (20); All: Gary Brazil (14)
- Highest home attendance: 17,592 vs Burnley
- Lowest home attendance: 1,968 vs Stockport
- Average home league attendance: 6,115

During the 1987–88 English football season, Preston North End F.C. competed in the Football League Third Division.

== Final league table ==
Pos	Team	Pld	W	D	L	GF	GA	GD	Pts
14	Bury	46	15	14	17	58	57	+1	59
15	Chester City	46	14	16	16	51	62	−11	58
16	Preston North End	46	15	13	18	48	59	−11	58
17	Southend United	46	14	13	19	65	83	−18	55
18	Chesterfield	46	15	10	21	41	70	−29	55

Rules for classification: 1) Points; 2) Goal difference; 3) Goals scored

== Results ==
Preston North End's score comes first

=== Legend ===
Win	Draw	Loss

=== Football League Third Division ===
Date	Opponent	Venue	Result	Attendance	Scorers
15 August 1987	Chesterfield	H	0-1	6,509	
22 August 1987	Bristol City	A	1-3	7,655	Brazil
29 August 1987	Wigan Athletic	H	0-1	7,057	
01 September 1987	Southend United	A	2-1	2,600	Williams, Atkins
05 September 1987	Grimsby Town	H	1-3	5,522	Swann
12 September 1987	York City	A	1-1	3,237	Brazil
15 September 1987	Northampton Town	H	0-0	5,179	
19 September 1987	Rotherham United	H	0-0	5,124	
26 September 1987	Blackpool	A	0-3	8,406	
29 September 1987	Brentford	H	1-2	4,241	Lowey
03 October 1987	Walsall	A	0-1	5,467	
10 October 1987	Port Vale	H	3-2	6,274	Brazil 2, Ellis
17 October 1987	Brighton & Hove Albion	A	0-0	6,043	
20 October 1987	Gillingham	H	1-1	5,676	Williams
24 October 1987	Bury	A	0-4	4,316	
31 October 1987	Chester City	H	1-1	5,657	Swann
04 November 1987	Bristol Rovers	A	2-1	2,804	Ellis, Jemson
07 November 1987	Mansfield Town	A	0-0	3,631	
21 November 1987	Doncaster Rovers	H	1-2	5,178	Miller
28 November 1987	Fulham	A	1-0	5,324	Jemson
12 December 1987	Aldershot	H	0-2	4,519	
19 December 1987	Notts County	A	2-4	5,730	Jemson, Swann
26 December 1987	Blackpool	H	2-1	11,155	Swann, Brazil
28 December 1987	Sunderland	A	1-1	24,814	Jones
01 January 1988	Wigan Athletic	A	0-2	6,872	
02 January 1988	York City	H	3-0	6,302	Brazil, Miller, Mooney
09 January 1988	Bristol City	H	2-0	5,229	Rathbone, Brazil
16 January 1988	Rotherham United	A	2-2	4,011	Brazil 2
27 January 1988	Northampton Town	A	1-0	5,052	Jemson
30 January 1988	Southend United	H	1-1	6,180	Mooney
06 February 1988	Grimsby Town	A	1-0	2,907	Brazil
13 February 1988	Sunderland	H	2-2	10,852	Swann, Mooney
20 February 1988	Chesterfield	A	0-0	2,864	
27 February 1988	Walsall	H	1-0	6,479	Brazil
01 March 1988	Brentford	A	0-2	3,505	
05 March 1988	Brighton & Hove Albion	H	3-0	5,834	Jemson, Swann 2
12 March 1988	Port Vale	A	2-3	4,647	Brazil, Swann
19 March 1988	Chester City	A	0-1	3,724	
26 March 1988	Bury	H	1-0	6,456	Jones
02 April 1988	Mansfield Town	H	1-0	6,254	Swann
04 April 1988	Doncaster Rovers	A	2-3	2,167	Swann 2
08 April 1988	Bristol Rovers	H	3-1	5,386	Ellis, Hildersley, Brazil
23 April 1988	Gillingham	A	0-4	2,721	
30 April 1988	Fulham	H	2-1	4,192	Swann, Brazil
02 May 1988	Aldershot	A	0-0	3,465	
07 May 1988	Notts County	H	1-2	5,822	Ellis

=== FA Cup ===
Round	Date	Opponent	Venue	Result	Attendance	Goalscorers
r1	14 November 1987	Mansfield Town	H	1-1	7,415	Atkins
r1r	17 November 1987	Mansfield Town	A	2-4	4,682	Jemson, Brazil

=== League Cup ===
Round	Date	Opponent	Venue	Result	Attendance	Goalscorers
r1-1	18 August 1987	Bury	A	2-2	2,362	Allardyce, Brazil
r1-2	25 August 1987	Bury	H	2-3 (4-5 aet)	4,923	Brazil, Hill (own goal)

=== Football League Trophy ===
Round	Date	Opponent	Venue	Result	Attendance	Goalscorers
n.prg8	13 October 1987	Bolton Wanderers	A	0-0	3,478	
n.prg8	27 October 1987	Stockport County	H	5-2	1,968	Mooney, Swann, Ellis, Jemson (2)
n.r1	19 January 1988	Rochdale	H	3-1	2,983	Atkins, Swann, Ellis
n.qf	16 February 1988	Mansfield Town	H	2-1	5,332	Brazil (2)
n.sf	09 March 1988	Hartlepool United	A	2-0	4,989	Atkins, Jemson
n.fn-1	12 April 1988	Burnley	A	0-0	15,680	
n.fn-2	19 April 1988	Burnley	H	1-3 aet (1-3)	17,592	Brazil

== Statistics ==
=== Appearances and goals ===
No.	Pos	Nat	Player	Total		Division Four		FA Cup		EFL Cup		EFL Trophy	
No.	Pos	Nat	Player	Apps	Goals	Apps	Goals	Apps	Goals	Apps	Goals	Apps	Goals
	DF	(England) ENG	Adrian Hughes	1	0	1	0	0	0	0	0	0	0
	GK	(Republic of Ireland) IRL	Alan Kelly Jr.	22	0	19	0	2	0	0	0	1	0
	DF	(England) ENG	Alexander Jones	28	2	22	2	2	0	1	0	3	0
	DF	(England) ENG	Bob Atkins	56	4	45	1	2	1	2	0	7	2
	MF	(Republic of Ireland) IRL	Brian Mooney	42	4	34	3	2	0	0	0	6	1
	GK	(England) ENG	David Brown	35	0	27	0	0	0	2	0	6	0
	DF	(England) ENG	David Miller	37	2	23 + 5	2	0 + 1	0	2	0	5 + 1	0
	FW	(England) ENG	Frank Worthington	15	0	4 + 8	0	0	0	0 + 2	0	0 + 1	0
	FW	(England) ENG	Gary Brazil	45	20	36	14	2	1	2	2	5	3
	MF	(England) ENG	Gary Swann	57	14	45 + 1	12	2	0	2	0	7	2
	DF	(England) ENG	Gary Walker	1	0	0	0	0	0	0	0	1	0
	DF	(England) ENG	Jim Branagan	5	0	3	0	0	0	2	0	0	0
	DF	(England) ENG	Jeff Wrightson	32	0	23 + 2	0	0	0	0 + 1	0	6	0
	MF	(England) ENG	John Lowey	7	1	4	1	0	0	2	0	1	0
	MF	(England) ENG	Les Chapman	21	0	15 + 2	0	0	0	1	0	2 + 1	0
	DF	(England) ENG	Michael Bennett	41	0	34	0	2	0	1	0	4	0
	DF	(England) ENG	Mick Rathbone	44	1	36	1	2	0	2	0	4	0
	FW	(England) ENG	Nigel Jemson	31	9	24 + 3	5	1	1	0	0	3	3
	MF	(England) ENG	Oshor Williams	12	2	9 + 1	2	0	0	0	0	1 + 1	0
	MF	(Scotland) SCO	Ronnie Hildersley	31	1	21 + 4	1	2	0	1	0	3	0
	DF	(England) ENG	Sam Allardyce	46	1	38 + 1	0	2	0	2	1	3	0
	MF	(England) ENG	Steve Wilkes	3	0	1 + 2	0	0	0	0	0	0	0
	FW	(England) ENG	Tony Ellis	31	6	20 + 4	4	1	0	0	0	5 + 1	2
	MF	(England) ENG	Warren Joyce	26	0	21 + 1	0	0	0	0	0	4	0
Player(s) who featured whilst on loan but returned to parent club during the season:
	DF	(England) ENG	Simon Jeffels	1	0	1	0	0	0	0	0	0	0

== Awards and Nominations ==
=== Club Awards ===
Award	Player	Notes	Ref.
Player of the Year	(England) Bob Atkins		
