= William Naughton =

William, Willie, Bill or Billy Naughton may refer to:

- Bill Naughton (1910–1992), playwright
- Willie Naughton (1868–?), Scottish football player (Stoke, Southampton)
- Willie Naughton (footballer, born 1962), Scottish football player (Preston North End, Walsall)
