= Mick Rathbone =

English footballer (born 1958)

Personal information
- Full name: Michael John Rathbone
- Date of birth: 6 November 1958 (age 68)
- Place of birth: Birmingham, England
- Height: 5 ft 10 in (1.78 m)
- Position: Full back

Team information
- Current team: Oldham Athletic (Physiotherapist and head of conditioning)

Youth career
- Aston Villa
- 1974–1976: Birmingham City

Senior career*
| Years | Team | Apps | (Gls) |
| 1976–1979 | Birmingham City | 20 | (0) |
| 1979 | → Blackburn Rovers (loan) | 15 | (0) |
| 1979–1987 | Blackburn Rovers | 258 | (2) |
| 1987–1991 | Preston North End | 91 | (4) |
| 1993–1995 | Halifax Town | 8 | (1) |
| Total | | 392 | (6) |

International career
| 1977 | England Youth | 2 | (0) |

Managerial career
- 1992–1993: Halifax Town (caretaker)
- * Club domestic league appearances and goals

Michael John Rathbone (born 6 November 1958) is an English former professional footballer who spent a number of years as part of the Everton medical team. He was most recently physiotherapist and head of conditioning for Oldham Athletic.

He played 384 games in the Football League representing Birmingham City, Blackburn Rovers and Preston North End. He played as a full back. After injury forced his retirement as a player he studied physiotherapy, and worked in that field for Halifax Town, Preston North End, and, from 2002 to 2010, Everton, where he became head of sports medicine. His son, Oliver, also became a professional footballer.

== Playing career ==
=== Birmingham City ===
Rathbone was born in Sheldon, Birmingham, and attended Sir Wilfrid Martineau School. His parents were both factory workers. He had ambitions to become a doctor, but decided instead to pursue a career in football when Birmingham City, the club he supported, offered him an apprenticeship in December 1974; as a schoolboy Rathbone had been associated with local rivals Aston Villa. He was capped twice at youth level by England. The 17-year-old Rathbone made his first-team debut on 31 August 1976 in a League Cup defeat to Blackpool at Bloomfield Road, and had a poor game as he later admitted that "I was at fault for both goals" and "had absolutely no confidence at all" due to what he deemed to be an intimidating atmosphere in the Birmingham City dressing room. He was so low on confidence that he tried to avoid manager Willie Bell so as to avoid training with or playing for the first team. He also recalled how he was never able to effectively pass the ball, either in training or in matches, to star forward Trevor Francis due to the nerves he felt in the presence of his childhood hero. However, he made his league debut on 20 October, as a substitute replacing Archie Styles in a 1–0 defeat to Tottenham Hotspur at White Hart Lane.

He turned professional in November 1976, and played 16 games in the First Division over the course of the 1976–77 season, but his form dipped and he appeared only rarely over the next 18 months. He was dropped by new manager Alf Ramsey and – at the insistence of his teammates – demanded a transfer; Ramsey told him "You can go by all means, but who's going to sign you? You are fucking crap!" He remained at Birmingham throughout Ramsey's reign, however his confidence remained very low. In March 1979, centre-half Joe Gallagher berated the club's young players in the dressing room, and Rathbone responded by informing manager Jim Smith that he intended to quit the game; Smith placated Rathbone by offering him a short break and a three-month loan spell at Blackburn Rovers to restore his confidence.

"God, that walk [onto the pitch]. It was torturous, agonisingly slow, especially when your legs had turned to jelly. I remember studying Charles I in history at school, how he lost the throne and finally ended up getting beheaded. Apparently he refused a blindfold and insisted on walking to the scaffold unaided. I wondered how in such dire circumstances you could still walk and, as I edged my way down that dark tunnel, I realised how he must have felt. It was all right for Charles, though, he only had to go thorough the ordeal once; I had to do it every bloody Saturday.

— Rathbone did not enjoy his time as a first team player at St Andrew's, though later admitted that he had been too sensitive at the time.

=== Blackburn Rovers ===
Rathbone joined Blackburn Rovers on a three-month loan in March 1979. Veteran midfielder Alan Birchenall immediately gave him nickname "Baz", in reference to actor Basil Rathbone. Having been struggling near the foot of the table at the Second Division time of his arrival, Blackburn were relegated to the Third Division at the end of the 1978–79 season. He enjoyed his time at Ewood Park however, and was instrumental in the loan being made permanent as he begged Jim Smith to sanction a transfer, which Smith did after accepting Rovers manager John Pickering's offer of £40,000. Rathbone signed a three-year contract and received a £2,000 signing-on fee. However his lack of confidence was then replaced with a lack of discipline, as he admitted that he and teammate Russell Coughlin "slow and surely ... drank and ate ourselves out of the game". New manager Howard Kendall gave him a three-month suspension in punishment for Rathbone's declining physical condition. During his suspension he met his future wife, who helped him to take a more professional approach to his drinking and eating habits.

Following the departure of Pickering, Rathbone was an infrequent member of the starting eleven, but under Bobby Saxton, appointed in 1981, by which time Blackburn had returned to the second tier, he became the regular first choice at left back. He suffered a broken leg in 1983, and a hamstring injury deprived him of an appearance at Wembley Stadium in the final of the Full Members Cup in 1987. In all, Rathbone spent eight seasons with Blackburn before Preston North End manager John McGrath paid a fee of £20,000 for his services in August 1987.

=== Preston and Halifax ===
Rathbone's Preston career was disrupted by a succession of injuries, including a broken arm and a fractured cheekbone. When a serious knee injury forced his retirement from playing in 1991, he began a degree course in physiotherapy at the University of Salford. McGrath, by then manager of Halifax Town, offered Rathbone the post of physiotherapist to the club, a role he could perform while continuing his formal study. On 8 December 1992, following McGrath's resignation, Rathbone was placed in temporary charge. The club's financial problems meant his caretaker role lasted until the end of the 1992–93 season, when they lost their Football League status. While continuing as physiotherapist, Rathbone resumed his playing career on an emergency basis for Halifax in the Conference, though his fitness level was rather less than it once had been. Towards the end of his time at Halifax, he added the assistant manager post to his collection, taking on what the Lancashire Evening Telegraph described as "the unique job description of assistant manager-player-physio", but in March 1995 he was sacked as a cost-cutting measure.

== Physiotherapy career ==
Rathbone then returned to Preston North End as physiotherapist. He spent six years at the club, during which time they progressed from Division Three (the fourth tier of English football) to the play-off for a place in the Premier League, latterly as part of David Moyes' backroom staff. When Moyes joined Everton as manager in March 2002, Rathbone followed a few months later after the clubs had agreed compensation. He spent nearly eight years at the club, becoming head of sports medicine, a post he left in May 2010 after what the Liverpool Echo described as "a tumultuous season of injuries" to the Everton players.

After leaving Everton, Rathbone went on to establish a business combining sports injury consultancy with motivational and after-dinner speaking. In January 2011, he rejoined Preston North End on a part-time basis until the end of the 2010–11 season, and also worked with the England under-17 team. In November 2014, he was appointed as Head of Performance at Blackpool, overseeing medical and fitness aspects at the club.

On 25 January 2017, it was announced that Rathbone would link up once again with his former Preston teammate Warren Joyce at Wigan Athletic to become the head of the club's medical team. Rathbone then worked as part of the medical team at Nottingham Forest, before re-joining Everton.

On 6 October 2022, he was announced as physiotherapist and head of conditioning at National League club Oldham Athletic, once again working with now Oldham manager David Unsworth whom Rathbone knew from his time at Everton.

He left Oldham in 2023

== Personal life ==
Rathbone is nicknamed Basil or Baz, in reference to actor Basil Rathbone. His son Oliver was a member of the Manchester United academy before he joined Rochdale in 2016. Rathbone's autobiography, The Smell of Football, was longlisted for the 2011 William Hill Sports Book of the Year.

== Career statistics ==
Appearances and goals by club, season and competition
| Club | Season | League | | | FA Cup | | Other | | Total | |
| Club | Season | Division | Apps | Goals | Apps | Goals | Apps | Goals | Apps | Goals |
|---|---|---|---|---|---|---|---|---|---|---|
| Birmingham City | 1976–77 | First Division | 16 | 0 | 2 | 0 | 1 | 0 | 19 | 0 |
| Birmingham City | 1977–78 | First Division | 2 | 0 | 0 | 0 | 2 | 0 | 4 | 0 |
| Birmingham City | 1978–79 | First Division | 2 | 0 | 0 | 0 | 0 | 0 | 2 | 0 |
| Birmingham City | Total | | 20 | 0 | 2 | 0 | 3 | 0 | 25 | 0 |
| Blackburn Rovers | 1978–79 | Second Division | 15 | 0 | 0 | 0 | 0 | 0 | 15 | 0 |
| Blackburn Rovers | 1979–80 | Third Division | 28 | 1 | 5 | 0 | 2 | 0 | 35 | 1 |
| Blackburn Rovers | 1980–81 | Second Division | 27 | 0 | 0 | 0 | 4 | 0 | 31 | 0 |
| Blackburn Rovers | 1981–82 | Second Division | 41 | 1 | 1 | 0 | 3 | 0 | 45 | 1 |
| Blackburn Rovers | 1982–83 | Second Division | 42 | 0 | 1 | 0 | 2 | 0 | 45 | 0 |
| Blackburn Rovers | 1983–84 | Second Division | 11 | 0 | 0 | 0 | 0 | 0 | 11 | 0 |
| Blackburn Rovers | 1984–85 | Second Division | 42 | 0 | 4 | 0 | 2 | 0 | 48 | 0 |
| Blackburn Rovers | 1985–86 | Second Division | 42 | 0 | 3 | 0 | 2 | 0 | 47 | 0 |
| Blackburn Rovers | 1986–87 | Second Division | 25 | 0 | 1 | 0 | 7 | 0 | 33 | 0 |
| Blackburn Rovers | Total | | 273 | 2 | 15 | 0 | 22 | 0 | 310 | 2 |
| Preston North End | 1987–88 | Third Division | 36 | 1 | 2 | 0 | 6 | 0 | 44 | 1 |
| Preston North End | 1988–89 | Third Division | 34 | 2 | 2 | 0 | 7 | 0 | 43 | 2 |
| Preston North End | 1989–90 | Third Division | 8 | 0 | 0 | 0 | 4 | 0 | 12 | 0 |
| Preston North End | 1990–91 | Third Division | 13 | 1 | 1 | 0 | 3 | 0 | 17 | 1 |
| Preston North End | Total | | 91 | 4 | 5 | 0 | 20 | 0 | 116 | 4 |
| Career total | | | 384 | 6 | 22 | 0 | 45 | 0 | 451 | 6 |

== Managerial statistics ==
Managerial record by team and tenure
| Team | From | To | Record | | | | |
| Team | From | To | P | W | D | L | Win % |
|---|---|---|---|---|---|---|---|
| Halifax Town (caretaker) | 8 December 1992 | 31 May 1993 | 25 | 4 | 5 | 16 | 16.0 |

== Honours ==
Blackburn Rovers

- Football League Third Division runner-up: 1979–80
