= Paul Lodge =

English footballer (born 1961)

Personal information
- Full name: Paul Lodge
- Date of birth: 13 February 1961 (age 65)
- Place of birth: Liverpool, England
- Height: 5 ft 9 in (1.75 m)
- Position: Midfielder

Youth career
- Everton

Senior career*
Years	Team	Apps	(Gls)
1979–1983	Everton	24	(0)
1982–1983	→ Wigan Athletic (loan)	5	(1)
1983	→ Rotherham United (loan)	4	(0)
1983–1984	Preston North End	38	(0)
1984–1985	Bolton Wanderers	4	(0)
1984–1985	→ Port Vale (loan)	3	(0)
1985–1986	Stockport County	13	(2)
1986	Barrow		
1986–1987	Southport	69	(5)
1987–1988	Macclesfield Town	14	(0)
1988–1991	Witton Albion		
- Morecambe
1993–1997	Southport	100	(3)
- Lancaster City
- Bangor City
- Chorley
- Burscough
Total		274+	(11+)

Managerial career
- 1999: Southport (caretaker)
- 2003–2004: St Helens Town
- 2006: Chorley
- * Club domestic league appearances and goals

Paul Lodge (born 13 February 1961) is an English former footballer and football manager.

A midfielder, he played in every division of the Football League, as well as in the Conference, Northern Premier League, and League of Wales. He began his career at Everton in 1979 and had loan spells at Wigan Athletic and Rotherham United, before joining Preston North End in 1983. He moved on to Bolton Wanderers the following year, who in turn loaned him out to Port Vale. After spending time with Stockport County, he headed into semi-professional football in 1986 with Barrow. He moved on to Southport, Macclesfield Town, Witton Albion (winning the Northern Premier League Premier Division title in 1990–91), and Morecambe, before returning to Southport in November 1993. After another 100 league appearances for the club, he ended his career following spells with Lancaster City, Bangor City, Chorley, and Burscough.

He began coaching with Southport in 1998 and also served as the club's caretaker manager in 1999. He spent June 2001 to March 2002 as Paul Futcher's assistant at Stalybridge Celtic. He took on the management reins at St Helens Town in July 2003 but was sacked in January 2004. After coaching at Accrington Stanley, he spent two months in charge at Chorley in late 2006. He then returned to his coaching role at Accrington Stanley.

== Playing career ==
Tutored by Colin Harvey and Ray Minshull, he turned professional at Everton in 1979. The "Toffees" hovered above the First Division relegation zone in 1979–80 and 1980–81. Manager Gordon Lee was then sacked and was replaced by Howard Kendall, who took the club to just one place off European football in 1981–82. Lodge was loaned out to Larry Lloyd's Wigan Athletic and Emlyn Hughes's Rotherham United in 1982–83. He scored one goal in five Third Division games for the struggling "Latics". He played four Second Division for the soon-to-be relegated "Millers". His brief spells at Springfield Park and Millmoor failed to reignite his career. He was transferred to Third Division side Preston North End later in the season, in a move that reunited him with Gordon Lee. Lodge had made twenty starts and four substitute appearances in league games in his four years at Goodison Park.

Lee left Deepdale in December 1983, and Alan Kelly went on to lead the "Lambs" to a mid-table finish in 1983–84. Lodge switched to league rivals Bolton Wanderers in the summer but featured just four times for John McGovern's "Trotters" after being sent off against Rotherham United early in the 1984–85 campaign. He was loaned to John Rudge's Port Vale in November 1984. He was only to play three Fourth Division games at Vale Park, before heading back to Burnden Park in January 1985. Lodge moved on to Les Chapman's Fourth Division Stockport County and scored twice in 15 games for the "Hatters" in 1985–86, in a brief stay at Edgeley Park.

Lodge dropped out of the Football League and joined Alliance Premier League side Barrow, before moving on to Northern Premier League side Southport in March 1986. He scored once in 13 games for the "Sandgrounders" in 1985–86. He made a massive 63 appearances in the 1986–87 season, scoring five goals. He played 26 games in 1987–88, before leaving Haig Avenue. Lodge played for Macclesfield Town and then joined Witton Albion. He debuted for Witton on 10 September 1988 and scored four goals from 57 appearances in the 1988–89 season. He scored two goals in 58 games in the 1989–90 season and four goals in 59 games in the 1990–91 Northern Premier League Premier Division title-winning season. He made a further six appearances in the 1991–92 season. He later played for Morecambe, before returning to Southport in November 1993. He scored once in 36 games in 1993–94, and then featured 46 times in the 1994–95 season under manager Brian Kettle. Lodge then played 47 times in 1995–96, and was appointed captain by new boss Billy Ayre. Lodge went on to play for Lancaster City, Bangor City, Chorley, and Burscough.

== Style of play ==
Lodge was a midfielder with excellent passing and vocal skills.

== Managerial career ==
Lodge returned to Southport as assistant manager to Paul Futcher in 1998. He became caretaker manager the following year after Futcher was sacked, before he returned to his assistant role under new boss Mark Wright. Futcher appointed him as his assistant at Stalybridge Celtic in June 2001, before the pair were sacked in March 2002. After working at St Helens College, he was appointed manager of North West Counties club St Helens Town in July 2003. He was sacked in January 2004 after his team lost ten of their previous eleven games. Town went on to finish 19th out of the 22 team division in 2003–04.

Lodge then went on to coach at Accrington Stanley and was promoted to the post of reserve team manager by John Coleman. Lodge was appointed manager of Northern Premier League side Chorley in September 2006. He signed ten young players in an attempt to mould a newer and more cost-effective team, but resigned after less than two months in charge after telling the media "..the players forced my hand. There was no pride from them, no fight..." The "Magpies" finished the 2006–07 season second-from-bottom. He later went on to work as a first-team coach at Accrington Stanley, and also worked at Accrington and Rossendale College.

== Career statistics ==
Appearances and goals by club, season and competition
Club	Season	League			FA Cup		Other		Total	
Club	Season	DivisioN	Apps	Goals	Apps	Goals	Apps	Goals	Apps	Goals
Everton	1980–81	First Division	11	0	0	0	0	0	11	0
Everton	1981–82	First Division	13	0	1	0	2	0	16	0
Everton	1982–83	First Division	0	0	0	0	0	0	0	0
Everton	Total		24	0	1	0	2	0	27	0
Wigan Athletic (loan)	1982–83	Third Division	5	1	0	0	0	0	5	1
Rotherham United (loan)	1982–83	Second Division	4	0	0	0	0	0	4	0
Preston North End	1982–83	Third Division	19	0	0	0	0	0	19	0
Preston North End	1983–84	Third Division	19	0	1	0	5	0	25	0
Preston North End	Total		38	0	1	0	5	0	44	0
Bolton Wanderers	1984–85	Third Division	4	0	0	0	1	0	5	0
Port Vale (loan)	1984–85	Fourth Division	3	0	0	0	0	0	3	0
Stockport County	1984–85	Fourth Division	12	2	0	0	0	0	12	2
Stockport County	1985–86	Fourth Division	1	0	0	0	1	0	2	0
Stockport County	Total		13	2	0	0	1	0	14	2
Southport	1985–86	Northern Premier League	11	1	0	0	2	0	13	1
Southport	1986–87	Northern Premier League	37	4	9	1	17	0	63	5
Southport	1987–88	Northern Premier League	21	0	1	0	4	0	26	0
Southport	Total		69	5	10	1	23	0	102	6
Macclesfield Town	1987–88	Conference	12	0	0	0	3	1	15	1
Macclesfield Town	1988–89	Conference	2	0	0	0	0	0	2	0
Macclesfield Town	Total		14	0	0	0	3	1	17	1
Southport	1993–94	Conference	26	1	0	0	10	0	36	1
Southport	1994–95	Conference	38	1	2	0	6	0	46	1
Southport	1995–96	Conference	36	1	1	0	10	0	47	1
Southport	Total		100	3	3	0	26	0	129	3
Career total			274	11	15	1	61	1	350	13

== Honours ==
Witton Albion

- Northern Premier League Premier Division: 1990–91
