= Oshor Williams =

Former English footballer

Personal information
- Full name: Oshor Joseph Williams
- Date of birth: 21 April 1958 (age 68)
- Place of birth: Stockton-on-Tees, England
- Height: 5 ft 9 in (1.75 m)
- Positions: Midfielder; forward

Youth career
- 1972–1975: Middlesbrough

Senior career*
Years	Team	Apps	(Gls)
1976–1977	Manchester United	0	(0)
1977	Billingham Synthonia		
1977–1978	Gateshead		
1978–1979	Southampton	7	(0)
1978	→ Exeter City (loan)	3	(0)
1979–1984	Stockport County	193	(26)
1984–1986	Port Vale	49	(6)
1986–1989	Preston North End	39	(12)
1989–1990	Lancaster City		
1991–1993	Winsford United		
1993–1994	Witton Albion		
1994–1995	Hyde United	16	(0)
Total		307+	(44+)
- * Club domestic league appearances and goals

Oshor Joseph Williams (born 21 April 1958) is an English former footballer in the English Football League who now works for the PFA as a union learning representative. During his playing days, he played both in midfielder and in attack. During his career, he took part in two successful Fourth Division promotion campaigns.

He started his career as a youth team player at Middlesbrough, before joining Manchester United in 1976. Failing to make the first team, he joined non-League Billingham Synthonia and then Gateshead before returning to the professional game with Southampton in 1978. A year later, he signed for Stockport County, where his career took off. Five years he spent with Stockport, making close to 200 league appearances. He then spent two years at Port Vale and then Preston North End. In 1989, he left the professional game permanently, joining non-League Lancaster City. He signed with Winsford United in 1993 and then Hyde United a year later. He retired as a player in 1995.

== Career ==
=== Early career ===
Born and raised in Stockton-on-Tees, County Durham, Williams joined his local league club Middlesbrough as a schoolboy in 1972, signing apprentice forms with the club once he had turned 15. However, when "Boro" decided not to offer Williams a professional contract in August 1976, he was immediately offered a second chance by Manchester United. Williams spent 12 months at Old Trafford before they in turn decided to release him.

Upon his release from United, Williams returned to the North East. He had spells with both Billingham Synthonia and Gateshead before he was spotted by a scout from Southampton, who offered him a trial with the club in March 1978.

=== Southampton ===
After impressing manager Lawrie McMenemy, Williams signed professional forms with the Dell club after they secured his services for a £4,000 fee. After just a handful of reserve team outings, he was loaned out to basement club Exeter City for the start of the 1978–79 season. In his month at St James Park, Williams made two appearances, scoring once, before returning to the Saints. He made his debut on 3 March 1979, taking Terry Curran's place at outside left at home to Arsenal against England international full-back Kenny Sansom. Despite showing plenty of natural ball control, his final touch was lacking. He made only three further starts, plus two substitute appearances before he was given a free transfer to Stockport County in September 1979.

=== Stockport County ===
It was at County that Williams found his feet, becoming a favourite with the Stockport fans. A quick winger with an eye for goal, Williams was at his most dangerous with the ball at his feet attacking the opposition full back. He acted as the captain whenever skipper Tommy Sword was unavailable. In four-and-a-half seasons at Edgeley Park, Williams played 216 games in all competitions, scoring 31 goals, before being surprisingly sold to Port Vale for £7,000 in November 1984. Under Jimmy McGuigan's stewardship, the "Hatters" struggled in the lower half of the Fourth Division table in 1979–80, 1980–81, and 1981–82. Their form improved slightly under new boss Eric Webster in the 1982–83 and 1983–84 campaigns.

=== Port Vale ===
His first season at Vale Park saw him make 22 appearances, scoring two goals. He cracked his left kneecap in a training accident in February 1985. He recovered his first-team place on his recovery two months later. His second season with the club saw Williams win his first promotion, when John Rudge's "Valiants" were promoted to the Third Division in 1986. Soon, though, after 62 games and seven goals for Vale, troubled Preston North End came calling after agreeing a bargain £2,000 fee in August 1986. Having recently refused new terms with the Vale, the move surprised observers of the game.

=== Preston North End ===
Manager John McGrath immediately installed Williams as captain. He made his debut on 26 August and scored on his home debut at Deepdale the following week in a 2–1 victory over Swansea City. Preston stormed to promotion at the end of the 1986–87 season; Williams missed three months with injury but scored 14 goals in 36 games, with four of his goals coming in braces against former clubs Stockport and Exeter. The next two seasons, however, were almost a washout, with injury restricting Williams to just a handful of games. At the end of the 1988–89 season, Williams decided to call it a day from playing full-time and started work behind the scenes at Deepdale, both as a coach and in the commercial department. Nevertheless, Williams still turned out part-time for Lancaster City in the Northern Premier League.

=== Later career ===
Upon leaving Lancaster at the end of the 1990–91 season, Williams moved onto Winsford United. He started five games and made three substitute appearances for Conference club Witton Albion in the 1993–94 season. He signed for Northern Premier League Premier Division side Hyde United for the 1994–95 season. He played 29 games and scored once during his time at Ewen Fields, helping the "Tigers" to a fourth-place finish and qualification to the first round of the FA Cup, with his goal coming as a last-minute equaliser to take the FA Cup second-round qualification match at Colwyn Bay to a replay.

== Post-retirement ==
After leaving Hyde, Williams studied at the University of Salford for his BA in politics and history. He later worked as a sports studies lecturer at Trafford College. He joined the coaching staff at Aberdeen in February 2003. He remained at Pittodrie until he was sacked alongside manager Steve Paterson in May 2004.

Williams now works for the PFA education service, where he is on hand to help footballers past and present in their efforts to gain qualifications for life after football. Williams also coached the under-16s at Wigan Athletic's Centre of Excellence.

== Career statistics ==
Appearances and goals by club, season and competition
Club	Season	League			FA Cup		Other		Total	
Club	Season	Division	Apps	Goals	Apps	Goals	Apps	Goals	Apps	Goals
Manchester United	1976–77	First Division	0	0	0	0	0	0	0	0
Southampton	1977–78	Second Division	0	0	0	0	0	0	0	0
Southampton	1978–79	First Division	6	0	0	0	0	0	6	0
Southampton	1979–80	First Division	1	0	0	0	0	0	1	0
Southampton	Total		7	0	0	0	0	0	7	0
Exeter City (loan)	1978–79	Third Division	3	0	0	0	0	0	3	0
Stockport County	1979–80	Fourth Division	28	1	0	0	2	0	30	1
Stockport County	1980–81	Fourth Division	36	6	2	0	5	0	43	6
Stockport County	1981–82	Fourth Division	45	9	2	2	2	0	49	11
Stockport County	1982–83	Fourth Division	34	2	1	1	2	0	37	3
Stockport County	1983–84	Fourth Division	37	6	1	0	4	2	42	8
Stockport County	1984–85	Fourth Division	13	2	0	0	2	0	15	2
Stockport County	Total		193	26	6	3	17	2	216	31
Port Vale	1984–85	Fourth Division	17	3	3	0	2	1	22	4
Port Vale	1985–86	Fourth Division	32	3	4	0	4	0	40	3
Port Vale	Total		49	6	7	0	6	1	62	7
Preston North End	1986–87	Fourth Division	29	10	3	2	4	2	36	14
Preston North End	1987–88	Third Division	10	2	0	0	2	0	12	2
Preston North End	1988–89	Third Division	0	0	0	0	1	0	1	0
Preston North End	Total		39	12	3	2	7	2	49	16
Hyde United	1994–95	Northern Premier League; Premier Division	16	0	5	1	8	0	29	1
Career total			307	44	21	6	38	5	366	55

== Honours ==
Port Vale

- Football League Fourth Division fourth-place promotion: 1985–86

Preston North End

- Football League Fourth Division second-place promotion: 1986–87

Trade union offices
Preceded by John Smith	President of the General Federation of Trade Unions; 2019–2021	Succeeded by Roy Rickhuss
