= Brendan O'Riordan =

Irish footballer

Brendan O'Riordan was an Irish soccer player during the 1970s.

His first club was Shamrock Rovers and he signed for Bohemians in November 1978 where he made 1 appearance for Bohs in European competition. His signing from Milltown was controversial.

A Republic of Ireland national football team youth international in his first season, he won the FAI League Cup at Dalymount Park.
