= Simon Gibson (footballer, born 1964) =

English footballer

Personal information
- Full name: Simon John Gibson
- Date of birth: 10 December 1964
- Place of birth: Nottingham, England
- Date of death: 10 April 2019 (aged 54)
- Place of death: Holmsund, Sweden
- Position: Defender

Youth career
- Chelsea

Senior career*
Years	Team	Apps	(Gls)
–1983	Chelsea	0	(0)
1983	→ Swindon Town (loan)	3	(1)
1983–84	Swindon Town	28	(2)
1984–86	Preston North End	42	(5)
1986–87	Rochdale	5	(0)
1987–	IFK Östersund		
- Herfolge BK
- Ulf-Sandnes
- Herfolge BK
Total		78+	(8+)

International career
1981	England Youth	3	(0)
- * Club domestic league appearances and goals

Simon John Gibson (10 December 1964 – 10 April 2019) was an English footballer who played as a defender.

== Career ==
Gibson started his career at Chelsea, where he played alongside players such as Mickey Droy, Clive Walker and Paul Canoville. In October 1983 Gibson went on loan to Swindon Town. The loan was turned into a permanent move a few months later in November. One of Gibson's most notable performances took place on 19 November 1983 when Swindon beat Kettering Town 7–0 in the FA Cup and was on the score sheet. Gibson joined Preston North End in December 1984 and scored on his debut against Brentford. In April 1986 at a game against Colchester Gibson was sent off along with teammate Bob Atkins which they lost 4–0. When Preston decided to changed from grass to a plastic pitch, Gibson was the last player to score on the old pitch in a 2–2 draw against Exeter City.

== Personal life ==
Gibson was married with one daughter. He later moved to Sweden to play football, where he died after a fight with cancer. Gibson was cremated in Umeå, Swedish.
