= Barry Dunn =

English footballer (born 1952)

Personal information
- Full name: Barry Dunn
- Date of birth: 15 February 1952
- Place of birth: Sunderland, England
- Position: Left winger

Senior career*
Years	Team	Apps	(Gls)
19??–1979	Newcastle Blue Star		
1979–1981	Sunderland	23	(2)
1981–1982	Preston North End	8	(1)
1982–1983	Darlington	16	(4)
–	Seaham Red Star		
- * Club domestic league appearances and goals

Barry Dunn (born 15 February 1952) is an English former professional footballer who made 47 appearances in the Football League playing as a left winger for Sunderland, Preston North End and Darlington. He also played non-league football for Newcastle Blue Star and Seaham Red Star.

Dunn was recruited by Sunderland from Wearside Football League side Blue Star, and the "willowy winger" debuted during the Black Cats promotion-winning season (1979–80) where he was "always looking to take his man on, get to the line and whip a cross in". His goals helped earn draws at Watford and Bristol Rovers.
