= Nigel Greenwood (footballer) =

English footballer

Personal information
- Full name: Nigel Patrick Greenwood
- Date of birth: 27 November 1966 (age 59)
- Place of birth: Preston, Lancashire, England
- Height: 5 ft 11 in (1.80 m)
- Position: Striker

Youth career
- 1983–1984: Preston North End

Senior career*
Years	Team	Apps	(Gls)
1984–1986	Preston North End	45	(14)
1986–1990	Bury	110	(25)
1990–1992	Preston North End	30	(4)
1992–1993	Halifax Town	25	(5)
1993–1994	Accrington Stanley	?	(?)
1994–1996	Bamber Bridge	?	(?)
Total		210	(48)
- * Club domestic league appearances and goals

Nigel Greenwood (born 27 November 1966) is an English former professional footballer who played in the Football League.

== Preston North End ==
A striker and a product of the Preston North End youth system Nigel made his debut as a seventeen-year-old in a league game away at Lincoln City a game they lost 4–0. With Preston enduring difficulties both on and off the pitch Greenwood found himself being used no less than 17 times that season scoring 5 goals as the Deepdale club were relegated to the league's basement division for the first time in their history. The following 1985–86 season PNE were installed as favourites for promotion but they endured the worst season in the club's history with Preston finishing 91st in the football league and having to endure the stigma of applying for re-election. For Greenwood however the season was a personal triumph with him scoring 10 goals from 36 games indeed as an attacking side Preston were not too bad with duo John Thomas and Gary Brazil both scoring goals regularly. In fact between the three of them almost 50 goals were scored in defence however it was a different matter with the club conceding over 100 goals in all games for the second season running.

== Transfer ==
In August 1986 though Greenwood was shocked to learn that Preston were prepared to sell him. Preston didn't want to sell him and Greenwood didn't want to leave but now that John McGrath was at the helm it was decided that funds needed to be made available to pay the signing on fees of the free transfer players he had lined up. Greenwood was considered to be worth £20k the most saleable asset PNE had so with the promise from McGrath that once Preston were in a viable financial position they would bring him back to Deepdale Greenwood signed for third division Bury. Greenwood enjoyed three and a half seasons at Gigg Lane scoring 28 goals in 136 games for The Shakers several of these against Preston who on at least 3 occasions tried to bring him back to Deepdale. On each occasion however the Bury board and management rejected Preston's offer much to Greenwood's frustration. It was only in February 1990 when Bury wanted to sign Mark Patterson that Bury allowed him to return to Deepdale in a deal that was worth £100k plus Greenwood to Preston. This deal turned out to be John McGrath's last as Preston boss as he resigned not two weeks later.

== Back at Deepdale ==
Greenwood's second spell at Preston was a disappointment. With the club after three successful seasons again struggling both on and off the pitch. With Nigel struggling with injury and with the return of former favourite John Thomas to the club he found opportunities few and far between. Indeed, in his two and a half years back at Preston he managed to play just 35 games scoring 5 goals before he was released in July 1992.

Nigel immediately signed for Halifax Town for the start of the 1992–93 season but in 28 games he scored just 5 goals as The Shaymen were relegated from The Football League. In Nigel's senior career he had played 252 first team games and scored 53 goals but he was now looking to take his career to another stage in Non-League football.

== Bamber Bridge and beyond ==
Nigel first signed for Bamber Bridge of the Northern Premier League where his brother and non-League legend Tony was manager becoming his assistant. Since then he has held a similar position at Accrington Stanley when Tony became manager there at the beginning of the 1996–97 season but they returned to Bamber Bridge two years later before in 2003 taking up the vacant job at Fleetwood Town where they guided the club to three promotions before leaving midway through 2008–09.
