= Paul Wilkins =

English footballer (born 1964)

Personal information
- Full name: Paul Harford Wilkins
- Date of birth: 20 March 1964 (age 62)
- Place of birth: Hackney, England
- Position: Forward

Senior career*
Years	Team	Apps	(Gls)
1981–1982	Tottenham Hotspur	0	(0)
1982–1984	Crystal Palace	13	(3)
1984–1985	Preston North End	6	(2)
1985–1986	Fisher Athletic	?	(?)
1986–1988	Chelmsford City	59	(20)
Total		78 (+)	(25 (+))
- * Club domestic league appearances and goals

Paul Harford Wilkins (born 20 March 1964) is an English former professional footballer who played in the Football League for Crystal Palace and Preston North End as a forward.

== Career ==
Wilkins was born in Hackney and began his career at Tottenham Hotspur as an apprentice but did not go on to make a league appearance. In January 1982, he signed for Crystal Palace, then playing in the Second Division. He made his debut, as a substitute for David Giles, in a 1–2 home defeat to Barnsley on 1 May. He went on to make a total of five appearances that season (three as substitute) and scored twice on his first starting appearance in a 2–1 home win against Wrexham. In 1982–83, Wilkins made only one appearance, as a substitute and a further seven appearances in 1983–84 (one goal). In June 1984, Wilkins moved on to Preston North End for whom he made six league appearances scoring twice, before moving into non-league football with Fisher Athletic in 1985. He subsequently played for Chelmsford City from 1986 to 1988.
