= Gary Brazil =

English footballer (born 1962)

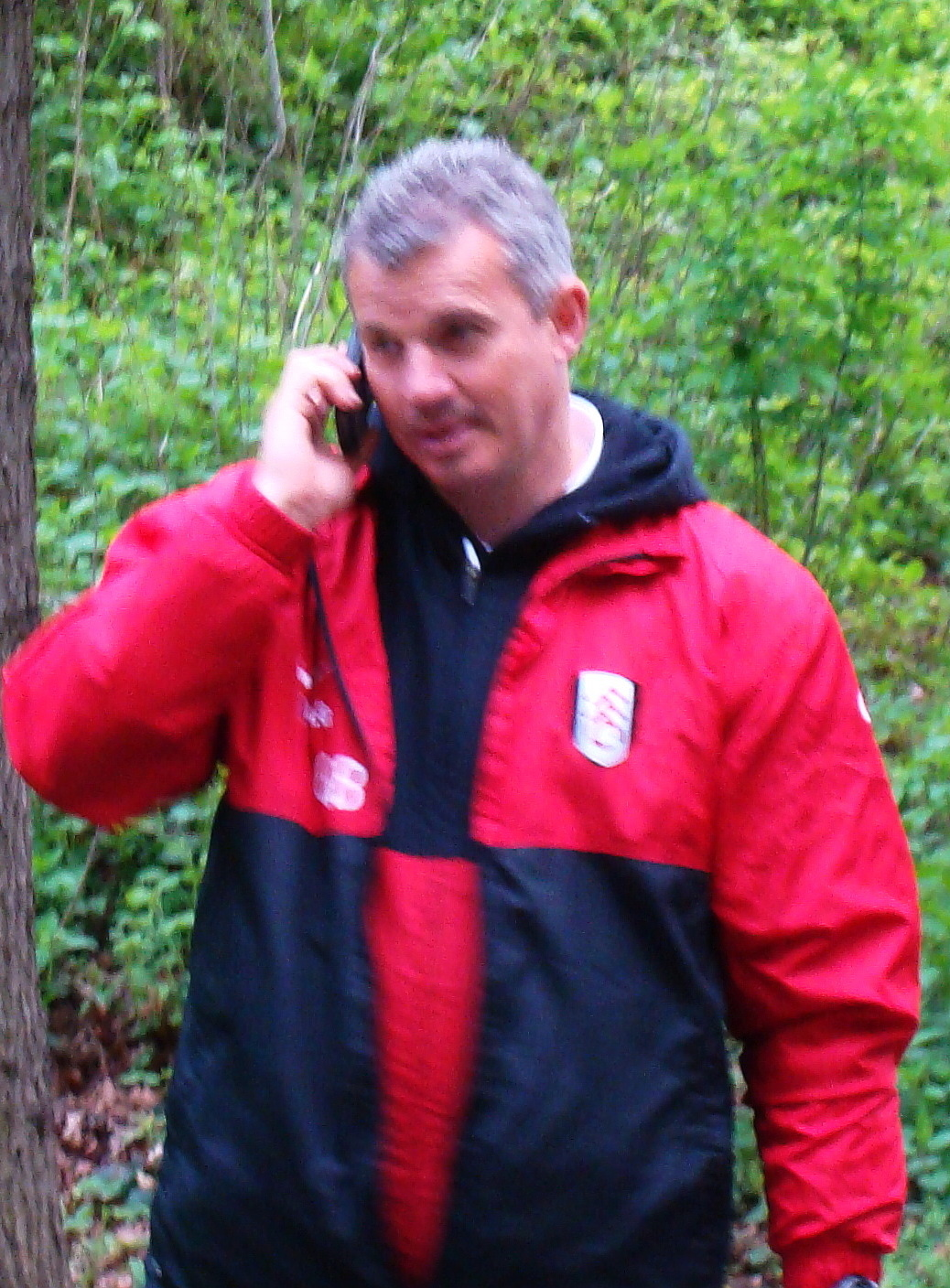
- Brazil in 2010

Personal information
- Full name: Gary Nicholas Brazil
- Date of birth: 19 September 1962 (age 64)
- Place of birth: Royal Tunbridge Wells, Kent, England
- Height: 5 ft 11 in (1.80 m)
- Positions: Midfielder; striker

Youth career
- 1979–1980: Crystal Palace

Senior career*
Years	Team	Apps	(Gls)
1980–1985	Sheffield United	62	(9)
1984	→ Port Vale (loan)	6	(3)
1985–1989	Preston North End	166	(58)
1989–1990	Newcastle United	23	(2)
1990–1996	Fulham	214	(47)
1996	Cambridge United	1	(1)
1996–1997	Barnet	19	(2)
1997–1998	Slough Town	50	(7)
Total		541	(129)

Managerial career
- 1999–2000: Notts County (caretaker)
- 2001–2002: Notts County (caretaker)
- 2014: Nottingham Forest (caretaker)
- 2017: Nottingham Forest (caretaker)
- 2017–2018: Nottingham Forest (caretaker)
- * Club domestic league appearances and goals

Gary Nicholas Brazil (born 19 September 1962) is an English former professional footballer and football manager. He scored 160 goals in 658 league and cup games in an 18-year professional career.

Starting at Crystal Palace, he turned professional with Sheffield United in 1980. Five years later, following a loan spell with Port Vale, he signed with Preston North End. He spent four seasons with Preston, then spent one season at Newcastle United, before transferring to Fulham in 1990. After six years with the club, he moved on to Cambridge United, Barnet, and finally Slough Town. He helped Sheffield United to win promotion out of the Third Division in 1983–84 and was named Preston North End's Player of the Year in 1987, having helped the club to win promotion out of the Fourth Division in 1986–87.

He went into coaching in 1999, and spent two periods as manager of Notts County and three spells as a caretaker manager at Nottingham Forest, where he was appointed academy manager for nine years, starting in 2014.

== Playing career ==
=== Sheffield United ===
Having joined Crystal Palace straight from school in 1979, Brazil stayed with Palace for just twelve months before taking the opportunity of first-team football with Sheffield United, signing on a free transfer in August 1980. In nearly five years at Bramall Lane he played 78 games, of which 30 were as a substitute, scoring 10 goals. The "Blades" suffered relegation out of the Third Division in 1980–81 under Harry Haslam. After Ian Porterfield took charge, they then made an immediate return as champions of the Fourth Division in 1981–82. A mid-table finish in 1982–83 followed, before a second promotion in three years was achieved with a third-place finish in 1983–84. However, they had only finished ahead of Hull City on goals scored. In August 1984 he joined Port Vale on loan, and scored three goals in six Fourth Division appearances for John Rudge's "Valiants".

=== Preston North End ===
Brazil was sold to Preston North End for £25,000 in August 1985 but could not prevent Tommy Booth's "Lilywhites" from being relegated out of the Third Division. The next season again was a disappointment. However, Brazil was now a regular and scoring frequently. Preston finished the season in 91st place in the Football League and were forced to seek re-election, forcing the powers that be at Deepdale to make vast changes. Brazil was voted Player of the Year in 1987, as the club won promotion in second place, with Brazil and John Thomas scoring 48 goals between them. The 1987–88 campaign was one of consolidation. However, Preston narrowly missed out on a Wembley cup final when they lost to Burnley in the Football League Trophy semi-final. A promotion push in 1988–89 ended in defeat to former club Port Vale in the play-off semi-finals. However, Brazil had already departed, having been picked up by Newcastle United for a fee of £200,000 (of which half was made up in a swap deal with Ian Bogie) in February 1989. In all competitions, he had played 202 games for Preston, scoring 72 goals.

=== Newcastle United and Fulham ===
Brazil started just three games of the rest of the season, as Newcastle suffered relegation out of the First Division. Manager Jim Smith gave him just five starts in 1989–90 behind strike partners Mark McGhee and Micky Quinn in the first-team pecking order at St James' Park. In September 1990, he moved on to Fulham for a fee of £110,000. In six seasons at Craven Cottage Brazil played 254 matches and scored 60 goals. He hit five goals in 1990–91, as the "Cottagers" almost exited the Third Division at the wrong end under the stewardship of Alan Dicks. Brazil finished as the club's top scorer in 1991–92 with 14 goals, as the club missed out on the play-offs by three places and four points. Following an indifferent 1992–93 campaign, he finished as the club's top scorer again in 1993–94 with 14 goals; however, his scoring record was not enough to prevent the club slipping into the bottom tier under Don Mackay. An unsuccessful promotion campaign followed in 1994–95 under Ian Branfoot's stewardship, with Fulham finishing two places and three points outside the play-offs.

=== Later career ===
Upon leaving Fulham at the end of 1995–96 he had spells at Cambridge United and Barnet, also of the Third Division. Fulham would finally win promotion out of the division in 1996–97 under new boss Micky Adams. In February 1997, he moved into Conference football with Slough Town. He scored on his debut for the club. He had 15 months with Slough, scoring ten goals in 69 games.

== Managerial and coaching career ==
=== Notts County ===
After retiring as a player, Brazil joined Notts County as a coach and then as assistant manager to Sam Allardyce. Following Allardyce's departure to Bolton Wanderers in October 1999, Brazil was prompted to take charge of a "Magpies" team that was enjoying a promising start to the season. The team faltered during the first half of 2000 and finished the 1999–2000 season in eighth place, two places but 17 points outside the play-offs. Brazil was demoted back down to assistant manager in May 2000, making way for Jocky Scott. He did receive a second chance at the helm between October and November 2001 after Scott was sacked following repeated clashes with the board, but this short reign was ended abruptly when Brazil was fired after failing to win a game over five weeks. He went on to serve Doncaster Rovers as youth team coach.

=== Nottingham Forest ===
In May 2012, he was appointed as a youth team coach at Nottingham Forest, replacing the departed Eoin Jess; he was to work alongside Steve Chettle. Brazil progressed through the ranks to become Academy Manager at the club in 2014. He became caretaker manager of the first-team after the sacking of Billy Davies in March 2014. During his temporary reign, he handed debuts to Ben Osborn, Dimitar Evtimov and Stephen McLaughlin, as well as a league debut to Dorus de Vries, before returning to his role as Academy manager whilst Stuart Pearce took over as first-team manager.

He was handed a second spell as caretaker manager of the club after the departure of Philippe Montanier in January 2017. On 9 February, following a good start to his caretaker spell, Brazil was confirmed as manager for the rest of the 2016–17 season. He was named as EFL manager of the week after overseeing a 3–0 win over Brighton & Hove Albion at the City Ground on 4 March, having changed the game with his substitution of Zach Clough. However, after Forest underwent a series of five defeats in seven games the club appointed Mark Warburton as first-team manager on 14 March.

Credited with the progress of Oliver Burke, Ben Osborn, Joe Worrall, Matty Cash, Jordan Smith and Ben Brereton, Brazil signed a new long-term contract five months later. Warbuton was sacked on New Year's Eve, leaving Brazil to again take on the role as caretaker manager. On 7 January, he oversaw Forest's 4–2 victory over Arsenal in the third round of the FA Cup. Aitor Karanka was appointed as manager the following day.

On 14 October 2020, Nottingham Forest announced that Brazil had signed a new long-term contract with the club. The club announced that he now held the role of Director of Football Development, in which he will assist with Forest's domestic scouting, footballing philosophy and loan programme alongside his role in the club's academy. Brazil's academy graduates have generated over £50 million in transfer revenue for Forest. On 25 May 2021, Nottingham Forest announced that their academy had been upgraded to Category One status. Brazil said "The current and future investments in facilities by Mr Marinakis will take us to another level. It is a fantastic opportunity for the club and it will be really exciting for the staff and players to challenge themselves at the elite end of academy football." He left his role as academy manager at Nottingham Forest in June 2023. He went on to work for The Football Association as head of men's recruitment and retention.

== Personal life ==
He is the father of former England youth player Ellie Brazil, as well as Jack Brazil, former coach of New Mongol Bayangol.

== Career statistics ==
=== Playing statistics ===
Appearances and goals by club, season and competition
Club	Season	League			FA Cup		Other		Total	
Club	Season	Division	Apps	Goals	Apps	Goals	Apps	Goals	Apps	Goals
Sheffield United	1980–81	Third Division	3	0	0	0	0	0	3	0
Sheffield United	1981–82	Fourth Division	1	0	0	0	0	0	1	0
Sheffield United	1982–83	Third Division	33	5	5	0	2	0	40	5
Sheffield United	1983–84	Third Division	19	2	4	1	5	0	28	3
Sheffield United	1984–85	Second Division	19	2	4	1	5	0	28	3
Sheffield United	Total		75	9	13	2	12	0	100	11
Port Vale (loan)	1984–85	Fourth Division	6	3	0	0	0	0	6	3
Preston North End	1984–85	Third Division	17	3	0	0	1	0	18	3
Preston North End	1985–86	Fourth Division	43	14	1	1	5	3	49	18
Preston North End	1986–87	Fourth Division	45	18	5	1	7	1	57	20
Preston North End	1987–88	Third Division	36	14	2	1	7	5	45	20
Preston North End	1988–89	Third Division	25	9	2	0	6	2	33	11
Preston North End	Total		166	58	10	3	26	11	202	72
Newcastle United	1988–89	First Division	7	0	0	0	0	0	7	0
Newcastle United	1989–90	Second Division	16	2	1	0	3	1	20	3
Newcastle United	Total		23	2	1	0	3	1	27	3
Fulham	1990–91	Third Division	42	4	3	1	3	0	48	5
Fulham	1991–92	Third Division	46	14	1	0	6	5	53	19
Fulham	1992–93	Second Division	30	7	0	0	0	0	30	7
Fulham	1993–94	Second Division	46	14	1	0	9	5	56	19
Fulham	1994–95	Third Division	32	7	2	0	6	0	40	7
Fulham	1995–96	Third Division	18	1	2	0	7	1	27	2
Fulham	Total		214	47	9	1	31	11	254	59
Cambridge United	1996–97	Third Division	1	1	0	0	1	0	2	1
Barnet	1996–97	Third Division	19	2	1	0	0	0	20	2
Slough Town	1996–97	Conference	12	3	0	0	1	1	13	4
Slough Town	1997–98	Conference	38	4	8	1	10	1	56	6
Slough Town	Total		50	7	8	1	11	2	69	10
Career total			554	129	42	7	84	25	680	161

=== Managerial statistics ===
As of 8 January 2018

Managerial record by team and tenure
Team	From	To	Record				
Team	From	To	P	W	D	L	Win %
Notts County (caretaker)	14 October 1999	28 June 2000	39	12	10	17	30.8
Notts County (caretaker)	10 October 2001	7 January 2002	20	4	6	10	20.0
Nottingham Forest (caretaker)	24 March 2014	3 May 2014	9	2	2	5	22.2
Nottingham Forest (caretaker)	14 January 2017	14 March 2017	11	4	1	6	36.4
Nottingham Forest (caretaker)	31 December 2017	8 January 2018	2	1	1	0	50.0
Total			81	23	20	38	28.4

== Honours ==
Individual

- Preston North End Player of the Year: 1986–87

Sheffield United

- Football League Fourth Division: 1981–82
- Football League Third Division third-place promotion: 1983–84

Preston North End

- Football League Fourth Division second-place promotion: 1986–87
