= Mel Tottoh =

English footballer

Personal information
- Position: Forward

Senior career*
| Years | Team | Apps | (Gls) |
- Lytham
| 1985 | Preston North End | 1 | (0) |
- Accrington Stanley
- Netherfield
- * Club domestic league appearances and goals

Mel Tottoh is an English former footballer who played in the Football League for Preston North End.

In 1985, Tottoh, a former radio officer in the Merchant Navy, was working for British Aerospace at Warton and playing as a forward for Preston North End's reserve team on a non-contract basis. Prior to a Fourth Division game against Scunthorpe United, originally scheduled for the evening of Tuesday 5 November, the first-team squad was badly affected by injuries, and Tottoh was called on to make up the numbers. Because the floodlights at the Deepdale ground had been condemned as unsafe, the game was re-arranged to kick-off at 2pm, so Tottoh left work early and cycled to the ground to take his place on the bench. Only 2007 supporters turned up, making it Preston North End's lowest ever league attendance. Tottoh came on as substitute as Preston lost the match 1–0, and never played in the Football League again, though he did play for non-league clubs Accrington Stanley and Netherfield, where he was player-coach.

Tottoh spent 17 years in the aerospace industry as an Executive Manager, leading a large team of in the development of advanced fast jets. He is now a management consultant.

In June 2025, Tottoh revealed he had been diagnosed with cancer.
