= Don O'Riordan =

Irish association footballer (born 1957)

Personal information
- Full name: Donald Joseph O'Riordan
- Date of birth: 14 May 1957 (age 69)
- Place of birth: Dublin, Republic of Ireland
- Height: 6 ft 0 in (1.83 m)
- Position: Midfielder

Senior career*
Years	Team	Apps	(Gls)
1975–1978	Derby County	6	(1)
1978	→ Doncaster Rovers (loan)	2	(0)
1978	Tulsa Roughnecks	52	(2)
1978–1983	Preston North End	158	(8)
1983–1985	Carlisle United	84	(18)
1985–1986	Middlesbrough	42	(2)
1986–1988	Grimsby Town	86	(14)
1988–1993	Notts County	109	(5)
1989	→ Mansfield Town (loan)	6	(0)
1993–1995	Torquay United	79	(3)
1995–1996	Scarborough	1	(0)
1996–1997	Gloucester City		
1997	→ Dorchester Town (loan)		
1997–1998	Galway United	3	(0)

International career
- Republic of Ireland U16
1973–1975	Republic of Ireland U18		

Managerial career
- 1993–1995: Torquay United
- 1997–2001: Galway United
- 2001–2004: Sligo Rovers
- 2004–2009: Sheffield United (coaching staff)
- 2008: China women's (coaching staff)
- 2009: Chengdu Blades
- 2010: South Africa women's (coaching staff)
- 2010: New York
- 2011: Beijing Baxy Women's Team (advisor)
- 2012–2014: Beijing Baxy Women's Team (head coach)
- 2014–2016: Galway WFC
- 2022: Treaty United WFC
- * Club domestic league appearances and goals

Donald Joseph O'Riordan (born 14 May 1957) is an Irish football coach and former professional player, who most recently was the manager of Women's National League club Treaty United. O'Riordan notably played for Middlesbrough, Grimsby Town and Notts County amongst others and has previously been on the coaching staff at Sheffield United, in the role of technical director/coach of their feeder club Chengdu Blades F.C. in China.

== Club career ==
=== Derby County ===
O'Riordan was born in Dublin. A central defender or midfielder, he began his career as an apprentice with Derby County, turning professional in May 1975. His league debut came on 23 March 1977, as a 24th-minute substitute for Charlie George in a 0–0 draw away to Tottenham Hotspur.

=== Tulsa Roughnecks ===
He played twice on loan to Doncaster Rovers in January 1978 and struggling to make an impact at Derby, moved to NASL side Tulsa Roughnecks where he played in every game in his first NASL season.

=== Preston North End ===
He returned to England in October 1978, joining Preston North End managed by Nobby Styles for a fee of £40,000 with a clause that meant he returned to Tulsa for the following US season on loan and at the end of that season he was voted Player of the Year by the Roughneck fans. He made 158 league appearances for Preston – being their fans voted him Player of the Year in 1981–82.

=== Carlisle United ===
He was on the move again, joining Carlisle United managed by Bob Stokoe in August 1983 on a free transfer. He had two seasons as a regular at Carlisle again being voted Player of the Year by the fans and in his second season finished joint top scorer with Malcolm Poskett eventually scoring 18 goals from 84 league appearances.

=== Middlesbrough ===
His performances earned himself a £55,000 move to Middlesbrough in August 1985. He missed only one game during the following season.

=== Grimsby Town ===
He joined Grimsby Town in August 1986. As well as playing 86 league games, scoring 14 goals, for Grimsby, he also acted as assistant manager to Grimsby manager Mike Lyons and later Bobby Roberts. While at Grimsby he started the Grimsby Town School of Excellence. Despite relegation in his second season he won the fans Player of the Year award and the Sunday People Player of the Year for that Division.

=== Notts County ===
In July 1988, O'Riordan was transferred to Notts County for a fee of £16,000. He had a spell on loan to Mansfield Town in September 1989, but went on to make over 100 appearances for County. He gave Notts County the lead against Tottenham Hotspur in an FA Cup Quarter-final at White Hart Lane in 1991, a match Notts County went on to lose 2–1 live on the BBC. His role as a front sweeper (in front of the defence) was particularly pivotal in Notts County's rise to the top flight in the 1990–91 season. O'Riordan's career was shortened at County by an injury on the opening day of the 1991–92 season against Manchester United at Old Trafford. He would play no further effective part in the season which Neil Warnock cited as being a big factor in Notts County getting relegated that season.

=== Torquay United ===
In February 1993 O'Riordan joined Torquay United as Player Coach at a time when Torquay looked favourites to get relegated out of the Football League but he played a big role in their survival and that summer took over as manager. In his first season as manager, a young Torquay side made the Division Three play-offs and lost the semi-final against his old club Preston North End. The game will be remembered for a wrong decision by the referee to send off the Torquay defender Darren Moore which gave Preston an advantage and they went on to score four times to win 4–1 and 4–3 over the two legs. After selling some of his key players from the play-off season the following season was to produce a mid-table position of safety.

The 1995–96 season started poorly for Torquay, and O'Riordan was dismissed after a heavy defeat at home to Scunthorpe United in October, with future Torquay forward Andy McFarlane scoring four goals. During his time in charge O'Riordan brought through players into the first team such as Darren Moore, Paul Trollope and Paul Buckle. Torquay accepted offers for many of the young players developed by O'Riordan during his time in charge but his two Caribbean signings Bajan international Gregory Goodridge and Rodney Jack the Saint Vincent National Team player brought in a reported one million pounds in transfer fees between them selling Goodridge to QPR before and Jack to Crewe after his departure.

=== Scarborough ===
He joined Scarborough as a player coach in December 1995, but played just once to bring down the curtain on his Football League playing career.

=== Gloucester City ===
He had a season at Gloucester City as a player and also as assistant to manager Leroy Rosenior which saw Gloucester just miss out on promotion and saw them lose the FA Trophy semi final also. O'Riordan guided Gloucester's very young Reserve team to a Cup Final victory when he played in the win against local rivals Cheltenham Town. After a loan spell at Dorchester Town he left Gloucester, having been appointed as manager of Irish side Galway United in the summer of 1997.

== International career ==
=== Republic of Ireland ===
He captained the Republic of Ireland at under 15 and youth levels and played for three consecutive years for Ireland at youth level playing in the 1973 UEFA European Under-18 Football Championship and 1975 UEFA European Under-18 Football Championship. He was in the senior squad four times but never managed to get onto the pitch and so failed to win a cap at senior level. When he was appointed Manager of the Republic of Ireland semi professional National Team while managing in Ireland he said that the appointment had made up for his disappointment as a player of never having played at senior level for his country.

He took charge of his country for a four-team tournament involving England, Scotland, Wales and the Republic that took place in the UK. Having defeated Scotland in their first game and England in their second game, Ireland lost to Wales in the final game and so lost the chance to be champions. The Irish were disappointed but they had performed very well when they ended England's long unbeaten run at this level during the tournament. O'Riordan's skills as a manager were recognised again later when he was working in Ireland when he was appointed Manager of the League of Ireland's under 21 Team.

== Managerial and coaching career ==
=== Galway United ===
In his first season in charge and despite his age (40) he did turn out on a few occasions for the Tribesmen. In his second season, he took Galway from the First Division into the Premier League. He had what was seen by the Galway fans as a very successful four years in charge of the club and as well as achieving promotion by reaching the semi-final of the FAI Cup twice and he sustained Galway's Premier League status for two seasons after their promotion before mutually agreeing to leave at the end of the 2000–01 season because of the financial difficulties encountered by the club. During his time in charge he was responsible for implementing a youth policy at United, which had not existed before his arrival. It reaped immediate rewards, as they became the first team from the West of Ireland to win a national cup at any juvenile level, in what was their first year of existence, when they defeated St Josephs of Dublin in the under 17 final, in Terryland Park.

=== Sligo Rovers ===
In July 2001, he was appointed as manager of Sligo Rovers, but never really managed to bring any real success to the club on the playing field despite a lot of hard work both on and off the pitch that also saw him work on the commercial side of the club looking to bring much needed funds into the club. O'Riordan set up the Sligo Rovers Youth Policy which has since produced many players that have gone on to play for the Rovers at first team level. After three years in the north-west O'Riordan mutually agreed to leave Sligo and returned to England after spending seven years as manager of two League of Ireland clubs. Besides his commitment to his League of Ireland employers both in Galway and Sligo he was well known in the West of Ireland for helping the local Technical Colleges both in Galway and in Sligo and enhanced his reputation in both cities when he guided the Galway IT Men's Team to the Ireland National Senior League title and later the Senior Women's Team from Sligo IT to the National League title of Ireland.

=== Sheffield United ===
He left Ireland and in 2004 and subsequently joined the Sheffield United coaching staff under then manager Neil Warnock, whom O'Riordan played for when Warnock was in charge of Notts County.

=== Chengdu Blades ===
On 27 April 2009, after the departure of Head Coach Li Bing, O'Riordan was appointed as the caretaker manager of Chengdu Blades F.C. before the Blades Super League game v Henan. His interim role with the team next to bottom of the table lasted only about a week but he managed to end the team's four-game losing streak when they drew 1–1 away to the then Super League leaders. The club appointed Wang Baoshan as the new Head Coach on 4 May and O'Riordan returned to his usual role of Technical Director/ Coach.

=== China women's national team ===
O'Riordan found himself involved in the 2008 Beijing Olympics when he was asked to help with the preparation of the China women's national team. After spending a week working with the team in a coaching role and also as an analyst the Women's team Head Coach Shang Ruihua asked the Chengdu Blades club for O'Riordan to be allowed to work with him for the duration of the team's involvement in the Olympic football tournament. His influence was seen during the build-up games just prior to the start of the tournament when China defeated Australia 5–0 and drew 0–0 with the eventual Olympic Champions the United States. China won their group by defeating Sweden followed by a tough game against Canada, before defeating Argentina in their final game. The Chinese lost to Japan in the quarter final and so ended their dream of gold on home soil. O'Riordan's input was publicly appreciated by the Women's Head Coach Shang when he spoke to the press after the tournament had finished.

=== South Africa women's national team ===
As a result of his involvement with the China women's team O'Riordan was invited in January 2010 to work with the South Africa women's under-20 team in the buildup to their World Cup Qualifier v Zambia. He spent the week working with the team helping the Head Coach August Makalakalane and South Africa won the first leg 6–0 in Johannesburg.

=== FC New York ===
In March 2010 he was appointed as Head Coach/Technical Director of FC New York a new professional club that entered the USL Division 1 in 2011. O'Riordan oversaw the club's under 15s, under 16s and under 20s who competed in the Super Y and Super 20 Leagues in the 2010 season. He resigned from FCNY in July 2010.

=== China ===
==== Beijing Baxi FC Women's Team ====
In January 2011 O'Riordan was appointed as Advisor to the Beijing Baxi FC professional women's team and helped them to finish 5th and reached the FA Cup Final losing to League Champions Shanghai. In January 2012 he was appointed Head Coach and became the first foreigner to be offered such a role.

=== Galway WFC ===
On 16 June 2014, it was announced that O'Riordan would take up the position of manager of Women's National League (WNL) club Galway WFC, replacing a player he had previously managed in Nigel Keady. He left in December 2016, to be replaced by Billy Clery his former charge at Galway United.

=== Treaty United ===
O'Riordan made a return to the WNL when he was announced as Treaty United manager in December 2021.

== Personal life ==
His younger brother Brendan O'Riordan played for Bohemians and Shamrock Rovers and his older brother Dermot is the Chairman of Cherry Orchard.

== Honours ==
Notts County

- Football League Second Division play-offs: 1991
