= Dale Rudge =

English footballer

Personal information
- Full name: Dale Anthony Rudge
- Date of birth: 9 September 1963 (age 63)
- Place of birth: Wolverhampton, England
- Position: Midfielder

Youth career
- 1981–1982: Wolverhampton Wanderers

Senior career*
Years	Team	Apps	(Gls)
1982–1984	Wolverhampton Wanderers	30	(0)
1984–1986	Preston North End	47	(2)
- Djerv 1919 25
- Hednesford Town
- * Club domestic league appearances and goals

Dale Anthony Rudge (born 9 September 1963) is an English former professional footballer. Playing as a midfielder, he represented his hometown club Wolverhampton Wanderers in the 1980s before moving on to Preston North End, Norwegian club Djerv 1919, and Hednesford Town.

Rudge, a Wolves apprentice, made his league debut on 18 December 1982 in a 4–0 win over QPR. He went on to feature 8 times during the 1982/83 season as Wolves won promotion from the Second Division at the first attempt. He made a further 19 appearances during the club's top flight campaign that ended in relegation, before moving to Preston North End. In total, he represented the Midlanders 29 times in all competitions.

The midfielder remained in English league football for two further seasons, making 47 league appearances for Preston in the bottom two divisions, scoring twice. Both goals came in the 1984–85 season against York City at home and Doncaster Rovers away.

He was released in the summer of 1986 and he joined Norwegian club Djerv 1919. He later returned to England with non-league Hednesford Town, where he helped the club to the 1992 Welsh Cup final.

A Preston North End fanzine, 'Deepdale Rudge' is named after him. He still makes the odd appearance for the 'old Wolves' side in charity matches and appears alongside the likes of Mel Eves, Dean Edwards, Andy Thompson and Phil Parkes. He currently coaches at the Old Swinford Hospital school, and has also coached at Kidderminster Harriers' academy.
