= Brian Mooney =

Irish footballer

Personal information
- Full name: Brian Gregory Mooney
- Date of birth: 2 February 1966 (age 60)
- Place of birth: Dublin, Republic of Ireland
- Height: 5 ft 10 in (1.78 m)
- Position: Midfielder

Youth career
- 1977–1981: Stella Maris
- 1981–1983: Home Farm

Senior career*
Years	Team	Apps	(Gls)
1983–1987	Liverpool	0	(0)
1986–1987	→ Wrexham (loan)	9	(2)
1987–1991	Preston North End	128	(26)
1991–1993	Sunderland	27	(1)
1992–1993	→ Burnley (loan)	6	(0)
1993–1995	Shelbourne	60	(13)
1995–1999	Bohemians	117	(19)
1999–2001	UCD	39	(3)
2001–2002	Monaghan United	12	(0)

International career
1995	League of Ireland XI	1	(0)
1985–1987	Republic of Ireland U-21s	4	(0)
1990	Republic of Ireland B	1	(0)
1989–1990	Republic of Ireland U23	2	(0)
- * Club domestic league appearances and goals

Brian Mooney (born 2 February 1966) is an Irish former footballer who made his name as a skilful winger in English football. Mooney was spotted in 1983 by Liverpool playing for Irish schoolboy club Home Farm F.C. where he had won a FAI Youth Cup. He went to school at St. Joseph's C.B.S. in Fairview.

Mooney played for the Republic of Ireland national under-19 football team that qualified for the 1983 UEFA European Under-18 Football Championship where despite remaining unbeaten in a group that included eventual winners France they were eliminated. Mooney scoring against the French at Elland Road. He also played at the 1984 UEFA European Under-18 Football Championship.

== Career ==
=== Liverpool ===
Having signed for Liverpool, Mooney immediately started to turn heads with some outstanding performances for Liverpool F.C. Reserves even breaking into the Republic of Ireland U-21s side after starring and scoring in the 1985 FIFA World Youth Championship. Breaking into the Liverpool first team however was a different matter. With a team consisting of Kenny Dalglish, Ian Rush, Craig Johnston, Ronnie Whelan and the like coupled with the fact that they were at the time the top club side in Europe it became increasingly difficult for Mooney to make a breakthrough playing in the end just one first team game in a Football League Cup tie against Fulham in October 1986. Even a successful loan spell in 1986 at Wrexham (8 games, 2 goals) only added to Mooney's desperate need for regular first team action. However, in October 1987 things took a turn for the better.

=== Preston ===
With newly promoted Preston North End struggling in the English third division manager John McGrath brought in both Mooney and Tony Ellis with Mooney initially on a months loan. Both players were an instant success with Mooney becoming the darling of the Deepdale terraces. At the end of his loan spell Liverpool agreed to sell Mooney for the moderate fee of £25,000. The next three and a half years were for Mooney a very successful period with his undoubted natural ability attracting the attention of many top flight clubs and the eye of Republic of Ireland boss Jack Charlton. In all, Mooney played 128 games for Preston scoring 26 goals and was named the club's official player of the year in 1988–89. Was voted 2nd in the clubs cult heroes

=== Sunderland ===
Although a Republic of Ireland cap eluded him Mooney did in the end earn a move to top flight Sunderland A.F.C. with the Rokerites (now the Black Cats) paying a fee of £225,000 for Mooney's services. His time at Sunderland was however a disaster with the club being relegated almost immediately and Mooney managing just 27 appearances (1 goal) in an injury ravaged two years. A loan spell at Burnley F.C. didn't help either with a now disillusioned Mooney dead set against the move, however with Sunderland wanting Mooney to play competitive games he did in his month there make 6 appearances for the Turf Moor outfit without scoring. Injury and poor form put paid to Mooney's career at Roker Park and although at the end of his contract there was interest from several other English clubs, Peterborough United being the most notable, Mooney decided that at the age of 27 to return to Ireland.

=== Return to Ireland ===
Upon his return to Ireland, Mooney signed for Shelbourne He scored in two consecutive rounds in the 1993–94 European Cup Winners' Cup. He then transferred to Bohemians in 1995 amid controversy . His last game for Bohs was in a relegation play-off in 1999 and he was then released . He then signed for University College Dublin A.F.C. where he was also studying full-time for a degree. During his time playing in the League of Ireland, Mooney played in both the UEFA Champions League and the UEFA Cup as well as playing for the League of Ireland Representative Team. After playing for Monaghan United in 2001–02, he retired.

== Honours ==
Individual

- PFA Team of the Year: 1988–89 Third Division
