= Gary Buckley =

English footballer (born 1961)

Personal information
- Date of birth: 3 March 1961 (age 65)
- Place of birth: Manchester, England
- Position: Midfielder

Youth career
- –: Manchester City

Senior career*
Years	Team	Apps	(Gls)
1980–1981	Manchester City	6	(0)
1981–1983	Preston North End	34	(2)
1983–1984	Chorley		
1984–1986	Bury	31	(1)
–	Chorley		
- * Club domestic league appearances and goals

Gary Buckley (born 3 March 1961) is an English former professional footballer who made 71 appearances in the Football League as a midfielder for Manchester City, Preston North End and Bury.
