= Geoff Twentyman Jr. =

English footballer (born 1959)

Geoff Twentyman
Personal information
- Full name: Geoffrey Twentyman
- Date of birth: 10 March 1959 (age 67)
- Place of birth: Liverpool, England
- Height: 6 ft 1 in (1.85 m)
- Position: Defender

Youth career
- Liverpool

Senior career*
Years	Team	Apps	(Gls)
- Formby
1982–1983	Chorley		
1983–1986	Preston North End	98	(4)
1986–1993	Bristol Rovers	252	(6)
1993	Yate Town		
1993	Linfield		
- * Club domestic league appearances and goals

Geoffrey Twentyman (born 10 March 1959) is an English former professional footballer who later became the main sports presenter for BBC Radio Bristol and BBC Radio Somerset.

The son of former Liverpool player Geoff Twentyman, Geoff Jr. began his career as a trainee at his father's club, but after failing to make the grade there he played for Formby before being sold on to Chorley for around £1,000 and from there to Preston North End. After making 98 league appearances for Preston, scoring four goals, he was released by the Lancashire club, and was signed by Bristol Rovers. He was taken to Rovers by Bobby Gould and was later managed by Gerry Francis, playing a total of 252 league games, scoring six goals, and making a Wembley appearance in the final of the Associate Members' Cup in 1990. Twentyman began coaching youth football with Brimsham Green F.C. in Yate shortly after moving to Bristol, and is now the club's honorary president.

When Francis left Rovers in 1991, Twentyman applied for the vacant manager's job but was not appointed.

After the end of his playing career he studied at Bristol Polytechnic and then joined Radio Bristol as a sports journalist. In 1993, he became the sports editor of Radio Bristol.

When Ian Holloway became the manager of Bristol Rovers in 1996, Twentyman joined him as assistant manager. The job was not to his liking and he returned to his previous job in 1997.

On 22 June 2008, he played for Bristol Rovers in the inaugural Western Masters, where the team finished third of the four teams competing.

In late 2015, it was announced that Twentyman would leave the Drivetime show he had been presenting on Radio Bristol and instead present a nightly sports show every weekday between 6 and 7pm, in addition to his presenting duties on Saturday Sport.

On 11 April 2023, it was announced that Twentyman would be leaving the BBC after three decades. His last programme was aired on 22 May 2023.

== Honours ==
Bristol Rovers

- Football League Third Division: 1989–90
- Associate Members' Cup runner-up: 1989–90
