= Steve Elliott (footballer, born 1958) =

English footballer

Personal information
- Full name: Stephen Blain Elliott
- Date of birth: 15 September 1958 (age 68)
- Place of birth: Haltwhistle, England
- Height: 6 ft 0 in (1.83 m)
- Position: Forward

Senior career*
Years	Team	Apps	(Gls)
1976–1979	Nottingham Forest	4	(0)
1979–1984	Preston North End	208	(70)
1984–1985	Luton Town	12	(3)
1985–1986	Walsall	69	(21)
1986–1989	Bolton Wanderers	60	(11)
1988–1989	Bury	31	(11)
1989–1990	Rochdale	52	(9)
1990–1991	Guiseley	?	(?)
Total		436	(125)
- * Club domestic league appearances and goals

Stephen Blain Elliott (born 15 September 1958) is an English former footballer who played as a forward in the Football League during the 1970s, 1980s and 1990s.

== Professional career ==
His opportunities at Nottingham Forest were limited and after only four League appearances in three years, he was subsequently allowed to move to Preston North End in 1979.

In five seasons at Deepdale he made 208 League appearances, scoring 70 goals, and it was this firepower that encouraged Luton manager David Pleat to invest £95,000 to bring him to Kenilworth Road in the summer of 1984.

Although scoring within three minutes of the start of his debut against Stoke City on the opening day of 1984–85, he struggled and was used in the part-exchange deal that brought David Preece to Kenilworth Road from Walsall in December 1984.

Elliott rediscovered his scoring boots at Fellows Park and after two successful years there he joined Bolton Wanderers for £25,000.

At Burnden Park though, his scoring rate slowed a little as proved by a return of 11 in 60 appearances over two seasons.

Spells at both Bury and Rochdale then followed before he dipped out of League football in 1990 to join AFC Guiseley.

Stephen was diagnosed with early onset dementia due to repeated head trauma aged 59 and is one of a number of former professional footballers currently living with the disease.
