= John Kelly (footballer, born 1960) =

English footballer

Personal information
- Full name: John Kelly
- Date of birth: 20 October 1960 (age 66)
- Place of birth: Bebington, England
- Height: 5 ft 10 in (1.78 m)
- Position: Midfielder

Senior career*
Years	Team	Apps	(Gls)
1978–1979	Cammell Laird		
1979–1981	Tranmere Rovers	64	(9)
1981–1985	Preston North End	130	(27)
1985–1987	Chester City	85	(17)
1987	Swindon Town	7	(1)
1987–1989	Oldham Athletic	52	(6)
1989–1991	Walsall	39	(1)
1989	→ Huddersfield Town (loan)	10	(1)
1990–1992	Huddersfield Town	18	(0)
1992–1993	Chester City	31	(1)
1993–199?	Rhyl		

International career
1982–1983	Republic of Ireland U21	2	(0)
- * Club domestic league appearances and goals

John Kelly (born 20 October 1960) is a former professional footballer who played in the Football League as a midfielder for Tranmere Rovers, Preston North End, Chester City, Swindon Town, Oldham Athletic, Walsall and Huddersfield Town.

The son of former Tranmere Rovers manager Noel Kelly, John established himself as a stylish midfielder in the lower divisions after joining Tranmere from neighbours Cammell Laird in September 1979. In 1985–86 he struck up a successful partnership with fellow new signing Milton Graham at Chester City, with Kelly scoring eight times as Chester were promoted from Division Four. A year later he moved up to the second tier with Swindon Town for £20,000, although he struggled to establish himself with the Wiltshire club and soon moved on to Oldham Athletic.

After spells with Walsall and Huddersfield Town, Kelly returned to Chester in the summer of 1992. Unfortunately, the 1992–93 season brought relegation to Division Three and Kelly was released at the end of the campaign. This marked the end of his professional career and he went part-time by joining Welsh side Rhyl.

Kelly made two appearances for the Republic of Ireland U21s, a nation he was eligible to represent as his father was born in Ireland.

== Honours ==
Chester City

- Division Four runners-up: 1985–86
