= Bob Atkins (footballer) =

English footballer

Personal information
- Full name: Robert Gary Atkins
- Date of birth: 16 October 1962 (age 64)
- Place of birth: Leicester, England
- Height: 6 ft 0 in (1.83 m)
- Position: Defender

Youth career
- 1978–1980: Leicester City

Senior career*
Years	Team	Apps	(Gls)
1980–1982	Enderby Town		
1982–1985	Sheffield United	40	(3)
1985–1990	Preston North End	200	(5)
Total		240	(8)
- * Club domestic league appearances and goals

Robert Gary Atkins (born 16 October 1962) is an English former footballer who played in the Football League for Sheffield United and Preston North End.

== Early years ==
Atkins was originally on the books of Leicester City whom he joined straight from school. He was however released by City without playing a first team game and for a while dropped down into non-league football with Enderby Town (later Leicester United). It was while playing for Enderby that Sheffield United spotted him and after an initial trial period the 20-year-old Atkins signed a permanent deal with The Blades.

== The Sheffield United and Preston years ==
In two and a half years at Bramall Lane Bob played 40 league games for United. He scored three goals, including a crucial last minute winner against Rotherham United on 21 April 1984. The two points gained from Atkins' last minute winner were vital in helping Sheffield United gain promotion a few weeks later, since they ended up only getting promoted on goal difference. However, midway through the 1984–85 season Atkins was offered, along with Gary Brazil, the chance to go on loan to Preston North End with the possibility of making the move permanent.

At the end of a season that saw Preston relegated, Atkins, along with Brazil, signed permanently for the club for a combined fee of £25,000. Preston were now in the Fourth Division. Although originally a midfielder, Atkins, who stood at 6'2, started finding himself due to injuries playing more frequently as a centre back. It was here that Atkins developed his confidence. Given the nickname "Skillful Bob" by the fans, due to his ability to bring the ball out of defence and look for a passing option rather than "hoof" it as many lower league defenders did, he was reliable and confident, in what turned out to be Preston's worst ever campaign with the club finishing 91st in the Football league.

The following 1986-87 season was thought to be a turning point in both Bob's and Preston's fortunes. With John McGrath now in the Deepdale hot seat North End stormed to promotion with Bob's three-pronged defensive partnership with Sam Allardyce and Alex Jones, nicknamed "the solicitors" an absolute rock at the back. Atkins scored one of the goals of the season to equalise from distance away at Crewe on Boxing Day 1986. The following three seasons for Atkins were much the same with him missing only a handful of games and turning out some sterling performances, indeed he was named the club's official player of the year in 1987-88 and was also awarded the club captaincy in 1988–89.

== Injuries ==
The 1989–90 season though proved to be his last for the club. Despite the club starting the season poorly, Bob was again a consistent performer in defence. However, an injury against Tranmere Rovers on Boxing Day 1989 more or less wiped out his season, and although he returned for the final third of the season Bob was never to kick a ball for Preston again. The following season (1991–92) Bob spent on the treatment table trying to overcome his injury problems, but at the end of the season he was forced to admit defeat and hang up his boots. He now lives back in Leicester.
