= Peter Litchfield =

English footballer

Personal information
- Full name: Peter Litchfield
- Date of birth: 27 July 1956 (age 70)
- Place of birth: Manchester, England
- Height: 6 ft 1 in (1.85 m)
- Position: Goalkeeper

Senior career*
Years	Team	Apps	(Gls)
- Droylsden
1979–1985	Preston North End	107	(0)
1985–1989	Bradford City	88	(0)
1988	→ Oldham Athletic (loan)	3	(0)
1989–1991	Scunthorpe United	25	(0)
- * Club domestic league appearances and goals

Peter Litchfield (born 27 July 1956) is an English former professional footballer who played as a goalkeeper. He started his career with Droylsden and played in the Football League with Preston North End, Bradford City, Oldham Athletic and Scunthorpe United. His sons Max Litchfield and Joe Litchfield are international swimmers.

== Career ==
Born in 1956 in Manchester, England, Litchfield started his career as a junior player with Manchester City and made three reserve appearances before being released at the end of the 1976–1977 season. He turned down a move to Stockport County and returned to City in September 1977 to play for the juniors on a monthly basis following an injury to another young keeper, Tony Armstrong. Later he moved on to local non-league side Droylsden. In January 1979, he was signed by Football League Second Division-side Preston North End for £3,000. He waited two years to replace first-choice goalkeeper Roy Tunks for his Preston debut, which came on 28 February 1981 against Chelsea, keeping a clean sheet in a 1–0 victory and earning The Sun newspaper's man of the match award. His prize was a £1,000 charity cheque, which he donated to a motor neurone disease cause, in memory of former Preston player Mel Holden, who had died from the disease. He made another two appearances in the Second Division, as the club were relegated in the 1980–81 season, and went on to play a total of 107 league appearances with Preston, winning the club's player of the year in the 1983–84 season. His Preston career ended with relegation to the Fourth Division.

In June 1985, he joined Bradford City on a free transfer, following their promotion into the Second Division. He replaced Eric McManus, who had been injured in pre-season. After making his debut on 17 August 1985 in a 2–1 victory at Carlisle United, he went on to be an ever-present in his first season with City. He played another 39 games the following season, but in June 1987, City signed Paul Tomlinson from Sheffield United for a club record fee of £47,500. Litchfield played only five more league games for City, and following a loan spell with Oldham Athletic in October 1988, he joined Scunthorpe United in June 1989 as competition for Paul Musselwhite.

Litchfield played 25 league games for Scunthorpe in the Fourth Division but a knee problem limited his appearances during the 1990–91 season, which brought about his retirement at the age of 34.

== Honours ==
Individual honours

- Preston North End player of the season: 1983–84
