= Jonathan Clark (footballer) =

Welsh footballer

Personal information
- Date of birth: 12 November 1958 (age 67)
- Place of birth: Swansea, Wales
- Height: 5 ft 10 in (1.78 m)
- Position: Midfielder

Youth career
- Hafod Brotherhood
- Manchester United

Senior career*
Years	Team	Apps	(Gls)
1975–1978	Manchester United	1	(0)
1978–1981	Derby County	53	(3)
1981–1986	Preston North End	110	(10)
1986–1987	Bury	14	(1)
1987–1989	Carlisle United	49	(2)

International career
- Wales Schoolboys
	Wales U21	2	(0)

Managerial career
- 1986: Preston North End (caretaker)
- * Club domestic league appearances and goals

Jonathan Clark (born 12 November 1958) is a Welsh former footballer. His regular position was as a midfielder. He played for in the English Football League for Manchester United, Derby County, Preston North End, Bury, and Carlisle United.

== Club career ==
Clark was in Manchester United's youth set-up and made his first-team debut in a First Division match against Sunderland on 10 November 1976 at the age of 17. It was to be his only first-team appearance for the club. He joined Derby County for £50,000 in September 1978, playing with the club in the First and Second Division until 1981.

During his time with Preston North End, he was the club's player of the year for the 1984–85 season.

== Management career ==
The following season he served as the club's caretaker manager including a spell where the club won five matches in a row. This was a highlight of a poor season which saw the club only win 11 games and eventually finish 23rd in the Fourth Division and have to seek re-election to the Football League.

== International career ==
He was capped at international schoolboy and played twice for the Wales national under-21 football team.

== Post-playing career ==
After retiring from football he worked in the pub trade for 25 years including running the Clarence Hotel in Blackpool.
