= Graham Houston =

English footballer

Personal information
- Date of birth: 24 February 1960 (age 66)
- Place of birth: Gibraltar
- Height: 5 ft 8 in (1.73 m)
- Position: Midfielder

Senior career*
Years	Team	Apps	(Gls)
1979–1985	Preston North End	128	(11)
1985–1986	Burnley	0	(0)
1986	Southport	1	(0)
1986–1987	Wigan Athletic	17	(4)
1987–1988	Carlisle United	16	(1)
1988	Northwich Victoria	8	(1)
1988–1989	Colne Dynamoes	?	(?)
1989–1990	Morecambe	?	(?)
1990–1991	Skelmersdale United	?	(?)
1991–1992	Chorley	?	(?)
- * Club domestic league appearances and goals

Graham Houston (born 24 February 1960 in Gibraltar) is a British former professional footballer who played in the Football League as a midfielder. He became a police officer in Lancashire and made the news by tackling a man with a knife while off duty.
