= Willie Naughton (footballer, born 1962) =

Scottish footballer

Personal information
- Full name: William Balloch Stirling Naughton
- Date of birth: 20 March 1962 (age 64)
- Place of birth: Catrine, Scotland
- Height: 6 ft 0 in (1.83 m)
- Position: Left winger

Youth career
- Preston North End

Senior career*
Years	Team	Apps	(Gls)
1979–1985	Preston North End	162	(10)
1985–1989	Walsall	151	(16)
1989–1990	Shrewsbury Town	49	(4)
1990–1991	Walsall	16	(1)
1991–1992	Chorley		
1992–1993	Bamber Bridge		
Total		378	(31)
- * Club domestic league appearances and goals

William Balloch Stirling Naughton (born 20 March 1962) is a Scottish former professional footballer who played in the Football League as a left winger.

== Honours ==
Walsall

- Football League Third Division play-offs: 1988
