= Andy McAteer =

English footballer

Personal information
- Full name: Andrew William McAteer
- Date of birth: 24 April 1961 (age 65)
- Place of birth: Preston, England
- Height: 5 ft 10 in (1.78 m)
- Position: Full back

Youth career
- 1977–1979: Preston North End

Senior career*
Years	Team	Apps	(Gls)
1979–1986	Preston North End	238	(8)
1986–1988	Blackpool	41	(0)
1988–1989	Preston North End	13	(1)
1989	Lancaster City		
Total		292	(9)
- * Club domestic league appearances and goals

Andrew William McAteer (born 24 April 1961) is an English former professional footballer. He played in the Football League in the late 1970s and throughout the 1980s.

== Career ==
=== Preston North End ===
Signing as an apprentice in July 1977, McAteer turned professional a year later. He made his Preston North End debut as an 18-year-old on Boxing Day 1979 in a 3–0 home win over Shrewsbury Town. Quickly establishing himself as a tough-tackling attacking full back, McAteer didn't miss a game for the rest of the season, becoming a firm favourite with the Deepdale fans. The following season, he struggled with injury but still made 26 appearances as the club were relegated to Division Three. These were hard times for Preston, as they constantly struggled against relegation and financial ruin. McAteer, however, was a mainstay in the team making 277 appearances scoring nine goals during his first spell there.

=== Blackpool ===
In December 1986 John McGrath accepted a bid of £17,000 from local rivals Blackpool. McAteer played for the Seasiders for eighteen months. In June 1988 he was given a free transfer, mainly due to injuries. He made 47 appearances without scoring.

=== Return to Preston ===
John McGrath offered McAteer a return to Preston, in the form of a two-year deal. Injury, however, restricted him initially. On returning to fitness, a game in the reserves resulted in an over-zealous YTS opposition player coming in too hard and breaking McAteer's tibia and fibula. He subsequently had to retire from the professional game at the age of 28. In total he had played 343 games, scoring 10 goals.

=== Non-league ===
Upon leaving the full-time game, McAteer first signed, along with Oshor Williams, for Northern Premier League club Lancaster City, but new work commitments meant that he played only one game for the club.
