= Tommy Booth =

English footballer and manager

Personal information
- Date of birth: 9 November 1949 (age 76)
- Place of birth: Middleton, England
- Position: Central defender

Youth career
- 1965–1967: Manchester City

Senior career*
Years	Team	Apps	(Gls)
1967–1981	Manchester City	382	(25)
1981–1984	Preston North End	84	(2)
Total		466	(27)

International career
1969–1972	England U23	4	(0)

Managerial career
- 1985–1986: Preston North End
- * Club domestic league appearances and goals

Tommy Booth (born 9 November 1949) is an English former footballer who played in the Football League for Manchester City and Preston North End, and was capped four times for England at under-23 level.

Booth was born in Middleton, Lancashire. He began his career with Manchester City, signing amateur forms in 1965, turning professional in 1967, and making his Football League debut on 9 October 1968 in a 1–1 draw at home to Arsenal. He played in the centre of defence, winning FA Cup, European Cup Winners' Cup and two League Cup winners' medals. He played 382 times for City in the League between 1968 and 1981, scoring 25 goals. In September 1981 he moved to Preston North End for £30,000. At Deepdale he made 84 appearances between 1981 and 1984, scoring twice, before injury forced him to retire during the 1984–85 season. In February 1985 he was appointed as Preston manager; with the club in difficult financial circumstances, he resigned in December 1985.

== Honours ==
Manchester City

- Football League First Division: 1967–68
- FA Cup: 1968–69
- Football League Cup: 1969–70, 1975–76; runner-up: 1973–74
- FA Charity Shield: 1972
- European Cup Winners' Cup: 1969–70
