= 1978–79 Wigan Athletic F.C. season =

Wigan Athletic F.C.
1978–79 season
- Chairman: Arthur Horrocks
- Manager: Ian McNeill
- Football League Division Four: 6th
- FA Cup: First Round
- League Cup: Second Round
- Top goalscorer: League: Peter Houghton (13); All: Peter Houghton (14)
- Highest home attendance: 9,427 (vs Barnsley, 3 March 1979)
- Lowest home attendance: 4,459 (vs Scunthorpe United, 30 September 1978)
Home colours

The 1978–79 season was the 41st season in the history of Wigan Athletic F.C. and their first as a professional club in the Football League. After finishing 2nd in the Northern Premier League during the previous season, the club was nominated to apply for Football League status, and were elected into the league to replace Southport. After a poor start, the club exceeded expectations in the league, and towards the end of the season, a second consecutive promotion seemed possible. The club eventually fell short, finishing the season in 6th place with a total of 55 points.

Wigan entered the FA Cup in the first round, but were knocked out by Bury following a replay. The club also entered the League Cup for the first time, winning against Tranmere Rovers before being defeated in the second round by Luton Town. The club's first signing as a member of the Football League was Ian Purdie, who along with Tommy Gore and Jeff Wright, went on to play every league game during the club's first season. Peter Houghton was the team's top goalscorer with a total of 13 league goals (14 in all competitions).

== Background ==
In the 1977–78 season, Wigan competed in the Northern Premier League, and secured a second-place finish in the last game of the season with a 1–0 win against Matlock Town. Under normal circumstances, league winners Boston United would have applied for Football League status, but the League Management Committee had decided that their ground was not up to the required standards. As a result, runners-up Wigan became the Northern Premier League's nomination to apply for Football League status.

At the time, the only way a team could be promoted into the Football League was if their application received more votes than one of the bottom four teams of the Football League in an annual election system. In practice, this process was usually a formality, and very few teams were promoted – Wigan's application to join the league had been rejected on 34 previous occasions. The vote took place on 2 June 1978. In the first poll, York City, Rochdale and Hartlepool United were all re-elected, Southport and Wigan tied, and Bath City, the Southern League nomination, received the fewest votes and were eliminated. A revote took place to determine whether Southport or Wigan would be elected into the Football League. Wigan Athletic received 29 votes to Southport's 20, confirming that Wigan would replace Southport in the Fourth Division next season. It is believed that Wigan's strong performance in the FA Cup, where they reached the third round, earned them the support they needed to be elected into the Football League.

== Match results ==
=== Legend ===
Win	Draw	Loss

=== Friendlies ===
Date	Opponent	Venue	Result
3 August 1978	SpVgg Erkenschwick	Home	2–0
11 October 1978	Zambia national team	Home	2–1
6 November 1978	Dundee	Home	2–2

=== League ===
On 19 August 1978, Wigan Athletic played their first Football League game against Hereford United at Edgar Street, captained by the club's appearance record holder Ian Gillibrand. The match finished 0–0. Their first home League game was against Grimsby Town ended with a 3–0 defeat. Wigan were awarded a penalty with the scoreline at 2–0, but was missed by Ian Purdie. A defeat against Reading followed. On 2 September, in the club's fourth game of the season against Newport County, Joe Hinnigan became Wigan's first ever League goal scorer, but the team went on to lose the match 3–2. After losing 2–1 away at Wimbledon, the club's fourth consecutive defeat, Wigan found themselves at the bottom of the table. The club recorded its first League victory in the next match against Rochdale, winning the match 3–0 following the dismissal of Rochdale defender Bob Scott.

In October 1978, Wigan played a friendly against the Zambian national team, coached by former Latics manager Brian Tiler.

On 13 April 1979, Wigan came back to beat Port Vale 5–3 after being three goals down with 25 minutes remaining.

Fourth Division match details
Game	Date	Opponent	Venue	Result	Attendance	Goalscorers
1	19 August 1978	Hereford United	Away	0–0	5,674	
2	23 August 1978	Grimsby Town	Home	0–3	9,227	
3	26 August 1978	Reading	Away	0–2	4,788	
4	2 September 1978	Newport County	Home	2–3	5,319	Hinnigan, Purdie
5	9 September 1978	Wimbledon	Away	1–2	3,217	Corrigan
6	13 September 1978	Rochdale	Home	3–0	5,746	Wright, Corrigan, Hinnigan
7	16 September 1978	Bradford City	Home	1–3	7,090	Purdie
8	23 September 1978	York City	Away	1–0	3,307	Gore
9	26 September 1978	Portsmouth	Away	0–1	13,902	
10	30 September 1978	Scunthorpe United	Home	1–0	4,459	Brownbill
11	7 October 1978	Huddersfield Town	Away	1–1	5,150	Brownbill
12	14 October 1978	Doncaster Rovers	Home	1–0	5,788	Ward
13	18 October 1978	Halifax Town	Home	1–0	5,216	Hinnigan
14	21 October 1978	Barnsley	Away	0–0	9,841	
15	28 October 1978	Northampton Town	Home	2–0	6,264	Purdie (2, 1 pen.)
16	3 November 1978	Stockport County	Away	1–0	8,357	Hinnigan
17	10 November 1978	Newport County	Away	1–2	4,142	Houghton
18	18 November 1978	Reading	Home	3–0	5,858	Houghton (2), Ward
19	9 December 1978	Darlington	Away	1–1	1,967	Moore
20	16 December 1978	Halifax Town	Away	2–1	2,437	Moore, Purdie
21	26 December 1978	Crewe Alexandra	Home	1–0	7,586	Houghton
22	30 December 1978	Aldershot	Home	3–2	7,289	Moore, Houghton (2)
23	9 January 1979	Port Vale	Away	1–2	3,744	Wright (pen.)
24	3 February 1979	Portsmouth	Home	2–0	8,289	Wright, Corrigan
25	14 February 1979	Wimbledon	Home	1–2	6,704	Purdie (pen.)
26	17 February 1979	Huddersfield Town	Home	2–1	7,420	Ward (2)
27	24 February 1979	Doncaster Rovers	Away	1–0	4,612	Wright
28	28 February 1979	York City	Home	1–1	5,896	Houghton
29	3 March 1979	Barnsley	Home	1–1	9,427	Wright
30	10 March 1979	Northampton Town	Away	4–2	2,275	Brownbill (2), Purdie, Corrigan
31	14 March 1979	Torquay United	Home	3–1	5,722	Moore (2), Hinnigan
32	17 March 1979	Stockport County	Home	2–0	7,610	Wright, Smart
33	19 March 1979	Rochdale	Away	2–0	3,621	Purdie, Moore
34	24 March 1979	Grimsby Town	Away	1–3	8,252	Wigginton (o.g.)
35	28 March 1979	Hereford United	Home	0–0	4,876	
36	31 March 1979	Bournemouth	Home	1–0	5,527	Houghton
37	3 April 1979	Hartlepool United	Away	1–1	2,081	Houghton
38	7 April 1979	Torquay United	Away	1–1	2,969	Houghton
39	13 April 1979	Port Vale	Home	5–3	8,452	Houghton (3), Brownbill, Moore
40	14 April 1979	Crewe Alexandra	Away	1–1	4,604	Purdie (pen.)
41	16 April 1979	Hartlepool United	Home	2–2	8,217	Wright, Purdie
42	21 April 1979	Aldershot	Away	0–1	5,466	
43	28 April 1979	Darlington	Home	2–2	6,153	Moore, Brownbill
44	1 May 1979	Scunthorpe United	Away	1–0	1,582	Gore
45	5 May 1979	Bournemouth	Away	1–2	3,063	Purdie
46	7 May 1979	Bradford City	Away	1–1	3,748	Moore

=== FA Cup ===
Round	Date	Opponent	Venue	Result	Attendance	Goalscorers
First	25 November 1978	Bury	Home	2–2	10,142	Gore, Houghton
First (replay)	29 November 1978	Bury	Away	1–4	9,339	Moore

=== League Cup ===
As a newly promoted Football League club, Wigan Athletic were also entered into the League Cup for the first time in their history, and were drawn in the First round against Third Division side Tranmere Rovers. The first leg of the tie was played at Prenton Park, and was Wigan's first competitive fixture as a League club. The match finished 1–1, with Tommy Gore scoring a late equaliser with an effort from long range. Wigan progressed to the next round after winning the return leg 2–1. In the Second Round, Wigan played Luton Town of the Second Division at Kenilworth Road, but despite producing a strong performance they were ultimately defeated 2–0.

Round	Date	Opponent	Venue	Result	Attendance	Goalscorers
First (1st leg)	12 August 1978	Tranmere Rovers	Away	1–1	4,902	Gore
First (2nd leg)	16 August 1978	Tranmere Rovers	Home	2–1	8,512	Corrigan (2)
Wigan won 3–2 on aggregate
Second	29 August 1978	Luton Town	Away	0–2	6,618	

== Final league table ==
Pos	Team	Pld	W	D	L	GF	GA	GD	Pts	Promotion
4	Barnsley (P)	46	24	13	9	73	42	+31	61	Promotion to the Third Division
5	Aldershot	46	20	17	9	63	47	+16	57	
6	Wigan Athletic	46	21	13	12	63	48	+15	55	
7	Portsmouth	46	20	12	14	62	48	+14	52	
8	Newport County	46	21	10	15	66	55	+11	52	

(P) Promoted

== Player statistics ==
Note: Numbers in brackets are appearances as a substitute.

Nat.	Pos.	Player	Apps	Goals	Apps	Goals	Apps	Goals	Apps	Goals
Nat.	Pos.	Player	League		FA Cup		League Cup		Total	
(England)	GK	John Brown	42	0	2	0	3	0	47	0
(England)	FW	Derek Brownbill	20 (10)	6	0 (1)	0	0	0	20 (11)	6
(England)	MF	Frank Corrigan	45	4	2	0	3	2	50	6
(England)	MF	Alan Crompton	7 (6)	0	0	0	2	0	9 (6)	0
(England)	DF	John Curtis	9	0	0	0	0	0	9	0
(England)	DF	Neil Davids	10 (2)	0	0	0	1 (2)	0	11 (4)	0
(England)	DF	David Fretwell	33	0	2	0	0	0	35	0
(England)	MF	Geoff Gay	1	0	0	0	0	0	1	0
(England)	DF	Ian Gillibrand	7	0	0	0	3	0	10	0
(England)	MF	Tommy Gore	46	2	2	1	3	1	51	4
(England)	GK	Mark Grew	4	0	0	0	0	0	4	0
(England)	DF	Joe Hinnigan	39	5	2	0	2	0	43	5
(England)	FW	Peter Houghton	23 (3)	13	2	1	3	0	28 (3)	14
(England)	FW	Mick Moore	40 (1)	9	2	1	0	0	42 (1)	10
(Scotland)	MF	Ian Purdie	46	11	2	0	3	0	51	11
(England)	MF	Ian Seddon	1	0	0	0	1	0	2	0
(England)	DF	Kevin Smart	40	1	2	0	1	0	43	1
(Northern Ireland)	DF	Noel Ward	44	4	2	0	2	0	48	4
(Scotland)	FW	John Wilkie	3 (1)	0	0	0	3	0	6 (1)	0
(England)	MF	Micky Worswick	0 (1)	0	0	0	0	0	0 (1)	0
(England)	MF	Jeff Wright	46	7	2	0	3	0	51	7

== Transfers ==
=== In ===
Player	Pos	Previous club	Date
Alan Crompton	MF	Blackburn Rovers	July 1978
Neil Davids	DF	Swansea City	July 1978
Ian Purdie	MF	Motherwell	July 1978
Kevin Smart	DF	Plymouth Argyle	July 1978
Ian Seddon	MF	Rochdale	July 1978
Geoff Gay	MF	Southport	July 1978
Mick Moore	FW	Port Vale	September 1978
Derek Brownbill	FW	Cleveland Cobras	September 1978
Dave Fretwell	DF	California Sunshine	September 1978

=== Out ===
Player	Pos	To	Date
Geoff Gay	MF	Macclesfield Town	1978
Micky Worswick	FW	Chorley	1978
Ian Gillibrand	DF	Retired	End of season
John Wilkie	FW	Retired	End of season

=== Loans in ===
Player	Pos	From	Date	Duration
Mark Grew	GK	West Bromwich Albion	December 1978	One month
John Curtis	DF	Blackburn Rovers	March 1979	End of season
