= 1979–80 Wigan Athletic F.C. season =

Wigan Athletic F.C.
1979–80 season
- Chairman: Arthur Horrocks
- Manager: Ian McNeill
- Football League Division Four: 6th
- FA Cup: Fourth Round
- League Cup: First Round
- Top goalscorer: League: Peter Houghton (15); All: Peter Houghton (16)
Home colours

The 1979–80 season was the 42nd season in the history of Wigan Athletic F.C. and their second as a professional club in the Football League.

The club finished the season in 6th place.

In the FA Cup, the club achieved an away victory against Second Division side Chelsea, reaching the Fourth Round for the first time in their history before being knocked out by Everton. The club did not progress beyond the first round in the League Cup. Peter Houghton was the team's top goalscorer with a total of 15 league goals (16 in all competitions). Goalkeeper John Brown won the club's Player of the Year award.

== Player statistics ==
Note: Numbers in brackets are appearances as a substitute.

Nat.	Pos.	Player	Apps	Goals	Apps	Goals	Apps	Goals	Apps	Goals
Nat.	Pos.	Player	League		FA Cup		League Cup		Total	
(England)	GK	John Brown	36	0	6	0	0	0	42	0
(England)	FW	Derek Brownbill	12 (6)	2	2 (1)	1	2	0	16 (7)	3
(England)	FW	Glen Buckley	1	0	0	0	0	0	1	0
(England)	MF	Frank Corrigan	41 (1)	7	6	1	2	0	49 (1)	8
(England)	MF	Alan Crompton	0 (1)	0	0	0	0	0	0 (1)	0
(England)	DF	Neil Davids	41	1	6	0	0	0	47	1
(England)	DF	David Fretwell	46	0	6	0	2	0	54	0
(England)	MF	Tommy Gore	46	9	6	3	2	0	54	12
(England)	DF	Nigel Hart	1	0	0	0	0	0	1	0
(England)	DF	Joe Hinnigan	27	5	6	1	2	0	35	6
(England)	FW	Peter Houghton	40 (1)	15	6	0	2	1	48 (1)	16
(Scotland)	DF	Ron McIvor	3	1	0	0	0	0	3	1
(Scotland)	MF	David McMullen	2	0	0	0	0	0	2	0
(Scotland)	DF	Colin Methven	34 (1)	2	6	1	0	0	40 (1)	3
(England)	FW	Mick Moore	17 (6)	3	0 (1)	0	0 (1)	0	17 (8)	3
(Scotland)	MF	Ian Purdie	8 (1)	1	0	0	2	0	10 (1)	1
(England)	FW	Micky Quinn	4	1	0	0	0	0	4	1
(England)	FW	Tony Quinn	17 (2)	9	4 (2)	0	0	0	21 (4)	9
(England)	GK	Chris Shyne	10	0	0	0	1	0	11	0
(England)	DF	Kevin Smart	8 (1)	0	0	0	2	0	10 (1)	0
(Scotland)	MF	George Urquhart	37 (4)	4	6	0	0 (1)	0	43 (5)	4
(Northern Ireland)	DF	Noel Ward	3 (1)	0	0	0	2	0	5 (1)	0
(England)	DF	Maurice Whittle	17	1	0	0	0	0	17	1
(England)	MF	Jeff Wright	46	5	6	0	2	0	54	5
