= List of Wigan Athletic F.C. players =

Wigan Athletic Football Club is a professional football team based in Wigan, Greater Manchester. They currently compete in the EFL League One.

The following is a list of notable footballers who have played for Wigan Athletic F.C. All players who have made 100 or more first-team appearances for the club are listed below. There are also players with fewer appearances listed who are holders of a club record, or winners of the club's Player of the Year award.

Legend
Player of the Year winner
Club record holder

Statistics correct as of 30 June 2026

Name	Nationality	Position	Club career	Appearances	Goals	Notes
Thelo Aasgaard	Norway	Midfielder	2020–2025	140	23	
Nigel Adkins	England	Goalkeeper	1986–1993	155	0	
Ali Al-Habsi	Oman	Goalkeeper	2010–2015	136	0	
Peter Atherton	England	Defender	1987–1992	149	1	
Leighton Baines	England	Defender	2002–2007	145	4	
Stuart Balmer	Scotland	Defender	1998–2001	101	4	
Kenny Banks	England	Midfielder	1952–1959	180	21	
Graham Barrow	England	Midfielder	1981–1986	179	35	
Paul Beesley	England	Defender	1984–1990	155	3	
Emmerson Boyce	Barbados	Defender	2006–2015	263	13	
Les Bradd	England	Forward	1981–1983	63	25	
Carl Bradshaw	England	Defender	1997–2001	120	11	
Titus Bramble	England	Defender	2007–2010	96	5	
John Brown	England	Goalkeeper	1976–1982	162	0	
Jimmy Bullard	England	Midfielder	2002–2006	145	10	†
Dan Burn	England	Defender	2016–2018	101	6	
John Butler	England	Defender	1981–1989, 1995–1997	302	15	
Nathan Byrne	England	Defender	2016–2020	127	2	
Gary Caldwell	Scotland	Defender	2010–2015	102	6	
Matt Carragher	England	Defender	1993–1997	119	0	
Roy Carroll	Northern Ireland	Goalkeeper	1997–2001	135	0	
Duncan Colquhoun	Scotland	Forward	1935–1938, 1945–1949	131	39	
Frank Corrigan	England	Midfielder	1977–1981	129	12	
Dennis Crompton	England	Midfielder	1958–1959, 1964–1967, 1968–1969	124	16	
Doug Coutts	Scotland	Defender	1969–1972	102	2	
Alf Craig	Scotland	Midfielder	1964–1968	126	1	
Alex Cribley	England	Defender	1980–1988	272	16	
Phil Daley	England	Forward	1989–1994	161	39	
Tendayi Darikwa	Zimbabwe	Defender	2021–2023	106	2	
Jason De Vos	Canada	Defender	2001–2004	90	15	
Arjan De Zeeuw	Netherlands	Defender	1999–2002, 2005–2007	178	6	
Chey Dunkley	England	Defender	2017–2020	107	13	
Nicky Eaden	England	Defender	2002–2005	122	0	
Nathan Ellington	England	Forward	2001–2005	134	59	
Lee Evans	Wales	Midfielder	2017–2021	107	6	
Simon Farnworth	England	Goalkeeper	1993–1996	126	0	
Teddy Felton	England	Forward	1933–1936	113	75	
Maynor Figueroa	Honduras	Defender	2008–2013, 2014	185	4	
John Filan	Australia	Goalkeeper	2001–2007	187	0	
Jim Fleming	Scotland	Midfielder	1969–1972	107	34	
David Fretwell	England	Defender	1978–1981	112	0	
James Garrett	unknown	Forward	1973–1977	102	25	
Ian Gillibrand	England	Defender	1968–1979	422	4	†
Jordi Gómez	Spain	Midfielder	2009–2014, 2016–2017	142	20	
Tommy Gore	England	Midfielder	1974–1980	287	41	
Scott Green	England	Defender	1997–2003	199	10	
Colin Greenall	England	Defender	1995–1999	162	14	
Bryan Griffiths	England	Midfielder	1988–1993	189	44	
Will Grigg	Northern Ireland	Forward	2015–2019	133	53	
Alan Halsall	Wales	Goalkeeper	1964–1969	153	0	
David Hamilton	England	Midfielder	1986–1989	103	7	
Simon Haworth	Wales	Forward	1998–2002	117	44	
Emile Heskey	England	Forward	2006–2009	82	15	†
Mark Hilditch	England	Forward	1986–1990	103	26	
Tom Hindle	England	Forward	1952–1955	103	32	
Joe Hinnigan	England	Defender	1975–1980	186	18	
Derek Houghton	unknown	Midfielder	1958–1968	348	19	
Peter Houghton	England	Forward	1978–1984	202	71	
Albert Jackson	England	Midfielder	1972–1975	108	27	
Matt Jackson	England	Defender	2001–2007	167	4	
Michael Jacobs	England	Midfielder	2015–2020	176	32	
Reece James	England	Defender	2018–2019	45	3	
Paul Jewell	England	Forward	1984–1988	137	35	
Alan Johnson	England	Defender	1988–1994	180	13	
Graeme Jones	England	Forward	1996–2000	96	44	†
Will Keane	Republic of Ireland	Midfielder	2020–2023	123	48	
Jason Kerr	Scotland	Defender	2021–2026	130	5	
Tony Kelly	England	Midfielder	1983–1986, 1995–1996	103	15	
Ian Kilford	England	Midfielder	1993–2002	221	32	
Chris Kirkland	England	Goalkeeper	2006–2012	131	0	
Barry Knowles	England	Defender	1984–1988	127	3	
Callum Lang	England	Midfielder	2017–2024	124	27	
Kevin Langley	England	Midfielder	1981–1986, 1990–1994	317	12	†
Andy Liddell	Scotland	Forward	1998–2004	217	70	†
Jack Lindsay	Scotland	Forward	1952–1954, 1956–1957	104	21	
Bert Llewellyn	England	Forward	1965–1968	115	96	
Bert Lomas	England	Goalkeeper	1952–1956	148	0	
Billy Lomax	unknown	Forward	1949–1955	169	131	
David Lowe	England	Forward	1982–1987, 1995–1999	296	66	
Harry Lyon	England	Forward	1962–1970	250	178	†
Jackie Lyon	England	Forward	1950–1955	151	83	
Andy Lyons	England	Midfielder	1993–1996	87	27	
Shaun Maloney	Scotland	Midfielder	2011–2015	79	14	
Roberto Martínez	Spain	Midfielder	1995–2001	187	17	
Gavin Massey	England	Midfielder	2017–2022	142	12	
James McArthur	Scotland	Midfielder	2010–2014	129	11	
James McCarthy	Republic of Ireland	Midfielder	2009–2013	120	7	
James McClean	Republic of Ireland	Midfielder	2013–2015, 2021–2023	153	21	
Lee McCulloch	Scotland	Forward	2000–2007	224	44	
Pat McGibbon	Northern Ireland	Defender	1997–2002	173	11	
Callum McManaman	England	Forward	2009–2015, 2018–2019, 2023–	178	14	
Mario Melchiot	Netherlands	Defender	2007–2010	97	0	†
Colin Methven	Scotland	Midfielder	1979–1986	296	21	
Ken Morris	unknown	Defender	1969–1978	229	8	
Sam Morsy	Egypt	Midfielder	2016–2020	155	8	
Charles N'Zogbia	France	Midfielder	2009–2011	83	15	
Graham Oates	England	Midfielder	1971–1973	100	30	
Harry Parkinson	unknown	Defender	1947–1957	342	0	
Joe Parkinson	England	Midfielder	1988–1993	119	6	
Andy Paterson	England	Midfielder	1934–1937	109	2	
David Perkins	England	Midfielder	2015–2018	83	1	
Andy Pilling	England	Midfielder	1987–1993	156	20	
Nick Powell	England	Midfielder	2013–2014, 2016–2019	123	36	
Max Power	England	Midfielder	2015–2018, 2021–2023	216	15	
Jimmy Prescott	England	Forward	1957–1962	135	39	
Dennis Reeves	Scotland	Goalkeeper	1969–1976	233	0	
Neill Rimmer	England	Midfielder	1988–1996	190	10	
Jack Roberts	England	Forward	1934–1935	57	54	†
Jason Roberts	Grenada	Forward	2003–2006	93	37	
Neil Roberts	Wales	Forward	1999–2004	125	19	
John Robertson	England	Defender	1992–1996	112	4	
Ted Robinson	England	Defender	1933–1947	237	3	
Hugo Rodallega	Colombia	Forward	2009–2012	112	24	†
John Rogers	England	Forward	1972–1976, 1982	180	79	
Paul Rogers	England	Midfielder	1996–1999	100	5	
Paul Scharner	Austria	Defender	2006–2010, 2013	159	14	
George Scott	England	Forward	1933–1936	120	79	
Steve Senior	England	Defender	1987–1990	109	3	
Kevin Sharp	Canada	Midfielder	1995–2002	178	10	
Billy Sutherland	Scotland	Defender	1968–1975	228	14	
Allen Tankard	England	Defender	1988–1993	209	4	
Dale Taylor	Northern Ireland	Forward	2024–2025	43	11	
Gary Teale	Scotland	Midfielder	2001–2007	162	8	
David Thompson	England	Midfielder	1987–1990	108	16	
Sam Tickle	England	Goalkeeper	2023–2026	139	0	
Syd Tuffnell	England	Midfielder	1934–1937	108	9	
Roy Tunks	England	Goalkeeper	1981–1988	245	0	
Antonio Valencia	Ecuador	Midfielder	2006–2009	84	7	†
Steve Walsh	England	Defender	1982–1986	126	4	
Noel Ward	Northern Ireland	Defender	1976–1980	134	11	
Ben Watson	England	Midfielder	2009–2015	111	13	
Jimmy Weston	England	Midfielder	1981–1983	66	2	
Jack Whatmough	England	Defender	2021–2023	83	3	
Roy Wilkinson	England	Midfielder	1964–1968	127	1	
Micky Worswick	England	Forward	1972–1979	249	73	
Callum Wright	England	Midfielder	2025–2026	41	7	
Jeff Wright	England	Midfielder	1973–1982	319	47	
