= List of Altrincham F.C. seasons =

The English football club Altrincham F.C. has been playing in lower-tier regional and national leagues since 1911. For fifty years, 1919–1968, Altrincham were in the Cheshire County League, then played successively in the Northern Premier League, Alliance Premier League and Football Conference. From 1997 to 2004 they moved between the Conference and the Northern Premier League, then after one season in Football Conference North won promotion to Conference National. Since 2015 they have been in the National League.

== League and finishing position in each season ==
Season	Division	Position	Significant Events
Joined the Lancashire Combination Division Two
1911–12	Lancashire Combination Division Two	2	Runners Up
1912–13	Lancashire Combination Division One	11	–
1913–14	Lancashire Combination Division One	13	–
1914–15	Lancashire Combination Division One	7	–
English football is postponed due to World War I
Joined Cheshire League
1919–20	Cheshire League	8	–
1920–21	Cheshire League	9	–
1921–22	Cheshire League	12	–
1922–23	Cheshire League	3	–
1923–24	Cheshire League	10	–
1924–25	Cheshire League	12	–
1925–26	Cheshire League	16	–
1926–27	Cheshire League	9	–
1927–28	Cheshire League	20	–
1928–29	Cheshire League	19	–
1929–30	Cheshire League	22	–
1930–31	Cheshire League	4	–
1931–32	Cheshire League	4	–
1932–33	Cheshire League	12	–
1933–34	Cheshire League	6	–
1934–35	Cheshire League	2	Runners Up
1935–36	Cheshire League	2	Runners Up
1936–37	Cheshire League	13	–
1937–38	Cheshire League	9	–
1938–39	Cheshire League	20	–
English football is postponed due to World War II
1946–47	Cheshire League	10	–
1947–48	Cheshire League	15	–
1948–49	Cheshire League	10	–
1949–50	Cheshire League	6	–
1950–51	Cheshire League	10	–
1951–52	Cheshire League	8	–
1952–53	Cheshire League	22	–
1953–54	Cheshire League	6	–
1954–55	Cheshire League	12	–
1955–56	Cheshire League	14	–
1956–57	Cheshire League	16	–
1957–58	Cheshire League	15	–
1958–59	Cheshire League	13	–
1959–60	Cheshire League	9	–
1960–61	Cheshire League	21	–
1961–62	Cheshire League	11	–
1962–63	Cheshire League	8	–
1963–64	Cheshire League	3	–
1964–65	Cheshire League	8	–
1965–66	Cheshire League	1	Champions
1966–67	Cheshire League	1	Champions
1967–68	Cheshire League	2	Runners Up
Joined as founder members of the Northern Premier League
1968–69	Northern Premier League	9	–
1969–70	Northern Premier League	12	–
1970–71	Northern Premier League	8	–
1971–72	Northern Premier League	10	–
1972–73	Northern Premier League	4	–
1973–74	Northern Premier League	3	–
1974–75	Northern Premier League	3	–
1975–76	Northern Premier League	7	–
1976–77	Northern Premier League	10	–
1977–78	Northern Premier League	5	–
1978–79	Northern Premier League	2	Runners Up
Joined as founder members of the Alliance Premier League
1979–80	Alliance Premier League	1	Champions
1980–81	Alliance Premier League	1	Champions
1981–82	Alliance Premier League	11	–
1982–83	Alliance Premier League	12	–
1983–84	Alliance Premier League	3	–
1984–85	Alliance Premier League	5	–
1985–86	Alliance Premier League	4	–
Alliance Premier League is renamed Conference
1986–87	Conference	5	–
1987–88	Conference	14	–
1988–89	Conference	14	–
1989–90	Conference	16	–
1990–91	Conference	3	–
1991–92	Conference	18	–
1992–93	Conference	10	–
1993–94	Conference	10	–
1994–95	Conference	4	–
1995–96	Conference	12	–
1996–97	Conference	22	Relegated
1997–98	Northern Premier League	8	–
1998–99	Northern Premier League	1	Champions
1999–2000	Conference	21	Relegated
2000–01	Northern Premier League	7	–
2001–02	Northern Premier League	9	–
2002–03	Northern Premier League	14	–
2003–04	Northern Premier League	12	–
Placed in the newly formed Conference North upon league re-organisation
2004–05	Conference North	5	Promoted
2005–06	Conference National	22	Reprieved
2006–07	Conference National	21	Reprieved
2007–08	Conference National	21	Reprieved
2008–09	Conference National	15	–
2009–10	Conference National	14	–
2010–11	Conference National	22	Relegated
2011–12	Conference North	8	-
2012–13	Conference North	4	-
2013–14	Conference North	3	Promoted
2014–15	Conference National	17	-
Football Conference is renamed National League
2015–16	National League	22	Relegated
2016–17	National League North	22	Relegated
2017–18	Northern Premier League	1	Promoted
2018–19	National League North	5	
2019–20	National League North	5	Promoted
2020–21	National League	17	-
2021–22	National League	14	-
2022–23	National League	17	-
2023–24	National League	4	-
2024–25	National League	9	-
2025–26	National League	13	-
2026–27	National League		
