= Tommy Gore =

English footballer

Personal information
- Full name: Thomas John Gore
- Date of birth: 26 November 1953 (age 72)
- Place of birth: Liverpool, England
- Height: 5 ft 7 in (1.70 m)
- Position: Midfielder

Youth career
- Liverpool
- Tranmere Rovers

Senior career*
Years	Team	Apps	(Gls)
1974–1980	Wigan Athletic	287	(41)
1974–1975	→ Dallas Tornado (loan)	35	(3)
1980–1983	Bury	119	(16)
1983–1984	Port Vale	36	(2)
Total		477	(62)
- * Club domestic league appearances and goals

Thomas John Gore (born 26 November 1953) is an English former footballer who played as a midfielder. He played 257 league appearances in a six-year career in the Football League.

He began his career at Liverpool, playing in the 1972 FA Youth Cup final. He later joined Tranmere Rovers before signing with Wigan Athletic in January 1974. He helped the club to the Northern Premier League title in 1974–75, as well as second-place finishes in 1973–74 and 1977–78, before Wigan were granted Football League status in 1978. He was voted the club's Player of the Year in 1978–79 and moved on to Bury in October 1980. At Wigan, he spent two summers in the United States with Dallas Tornado. He switched to Port Vale in July 1983 before a neck injury forced his retirement in October 1984.

== Career ==
Gore played youth football for Liverpool, playing for the "Reds" in the 1972 FA Youth Cup final defeat to Aston Villa. He moved on to Tranmere Rovers before joining Wigan Athletic in January 1974. He made 185 Northern Premier League appearances for Wigan, as they finished as runners-up in 1973–74, champions in 1974–75, sixth in 1975–76, 14th in 1976–77, and then second again in 1977–78. He also spent the 1974 and 1975 summers in the North American Soccer League with Dallas Tornado, where he notably played against Pelé, who was making his debut for the New York Cosmos. He played against Hereford United in Wigan's first ever Football League game and scored in a 1–1 draw at Tranmere Rovers in a Football League Cup first round first leg fixture on 12 August 1978, which was Wigan's first competitive goal as a Football League club. He was an ever-present in Ian McNeill's side throughout the 1978–79 Fourth Division campaign. He was also voted as the "Latics" first-ever Player of the Year. In the 1979–80 season, he scored the winning goal for Wigan against Chelsea in the third round of the FA Cup. He was suddenly transferred to Bury in October 1980, having made 102 consecutive league appearances since the club's first Football League fixture.

Manager Jim Iley led the "Shakers" to 12th in the Fourth Division in 1980–81, ninth in 1981–82, and fifth in 1982–83, just one place and two points behind promoted club Scunthorpe United.

Gore joined Port Vale in July 1983 after manager John McGrath secured the midfielder on a free transfer. He made 43 appearances for "Valiants" in 1983–84, scoring three goals, as new manager John Rudge failed to prevent relegation out of the Third Division. He suffered a neck injury in a League Cup game against former club Bury in August 1984, which forced his retirement two months later.

== Post-retirement ==
After retiring, Gore owned and ran a snooker club in Wigan for eight years. He now lives in Billinge and runs a cleaning company providing cleaning services on board ships. An accomplished golfer, he became club captain at Dean Wood Golf Club. He has also worked as a co-commentator on Wish FM and iFollow Latics.

== Career statistics ==
Appearances and goals by club, season and competition
Club	Season	League			FA Cup		Other		Total	
Club	Season	Division	Apps	Goals	Apps	Goals	Apps	Goals	Apps	Goals
Dallas Tornado	1974	NASL	20	3	—		—		20	3
Dallas Tornado	1975	NASL	15	0	—		—		15	0
Dallas Tornado	1976	NASL	0	0	—		—		0	0
Dallas Tornado	Total		35	3	0	0	0	0	35	3
Wigan Athletic	1978–79	Fourth Division	46	2	2	1	3	1	51	4
Wigan Athletic	1979–80	Fourth Division	46	9	6	3	2	0	54	12
Wigan Athletic	1980–81	Fourth Division	10	3	0	0	4	3	14	6
Wigan Athletic	Total		102	14	8	4	9	4	119	22
Bury	1980–81	Fourth Division	30	3	5	0	1	0	36	3
Bury	1981–82	Fourth Division	45	4	4	0	5	2	54	6
Bury	1982–83	Fourth Division	44	9	1	0	2	1	47	10
Bury	Total		119	16	10	0	8	3	137	19
Port Vale	1983–84	Third Division	36	2	1	0	6	1	43	3
Port Vale	1984–85	Fourth Division	0	0	0	0	1	0	1	0
Port Vale	Total		36	2	1	0	7	1	44	3
Career total			292	35	19	4	24	8	335	47

== Honours ==
Individual

- Wigan Athletic Player of the Year: 1978–79

Liverpool

- FA Youth Cup runner-up: 1972

Wigan Athletic

- Northern Premier League: 1974–75
