= Mick Moore (footballer) =

English footballer

Personal information
- Full name: Michael Moore
- Date of birth: 20 July 1952 (age 74)
- Place of birth: Chorley, England
- Height: 5 ft 10 in (1.78 m)
- Position: Midfielder

Youth career
- Adlington Rangers
- Blackburn Rovers

Senior career*
Years	Team	Apps	(Gls)
1970–1971	Preston North End	0	(0)
- → Chorley (loan)
1971–1974	Southport	83	(11)
1974–1975	Great Harwood		
1975	Dallas Tornado	20	(5)
1975–1977	Altrincham	68	(30)
1977–1978	Wigan Athletic	29	(11)
1978	Port Vale	13	(0)
1978–1980	Wigan Athletic	64	(12)
- Barrow
1983	Southport	1	(1)
- → Lytham (loan)
- Leyland Motors
- Glossop
- Chorley
- Horwich R.M.I.
- Adlington Athletic
Total		278+	(70+)
- * Club domestic league appearances and goals

Michael Moore (born 20 July 1952) is an English former footballer. A midfielder, he played for Preston North End and Port Vale but made his name at both Southport and Wigan Athletic. He helped Southport to the Fourth Division title in 1972–73. He played for Wigan in their first-ever season in the Football League. He also enjoyed an extensive non-League career, turning out for eleven different clubs, as well as spending a brief period in the United States with Dallas Tornado.

== Career ==
Moore played youth football for Adlington Rangers and Blackburn Rovers before becoming an unused squad member for Third Division side Preston North End in 1970–71. During that time, he also played on loan for Chorley in the Northern Premier League.

He signed with Southport, who were then in the Fourth Division, after impressing manager Jimmy Meadows by scoring a brace in the semi-finals of the Liverpool Senior Cup in September 1971. The "Sandgrounders" won promotion in 1972–73 as Fourth Division champions. However, they were relegated in 1973–74, after which Moore was released.

He spent time with Great Harwood and American side Dallas Tornado, before joining Northern Premier League side Altrincham in 1975. Great Harwood strike partner Dave Furnival soon joined him. He hit twenty goals in 45 games in league and cup in 1975–76. His scoring form continued into 1976–77, in which he bagged 17 goals in 41 games, including a hat-trick against Woking.

He then switched clubs to Wigan Athletic, scoring 11 goals in 29 league games in 1977–78. The club were voted into the Football League after finishing second in the Northern Premier League at the end of the season. However, Moore missed the celebrations as he joined Port Vale for a £3,000 fee in March 1978. He played the last 13 games of the season, but failed to score and was transferred back to Wigan for £2,000 on 1 September 1978.

He scored nine goals in 41 games for the "Latics" in 1978–79, as Wigan posted a sixth-place finish in their first season of league football. Wigan again finished sixth in 1979–80, and Moore returned to non-League circles with Barrow, who were competing in the Alliance Premier League. He later returned to Southport, who had by then lost their league status. He also played for Lytham (on loan), Leyland Motors, Glossop, Chorley, Horwich R.M.I. and Adlington Athletic.

== Style of play ==
Altrincham F.C. historian Terry Rowley described Moore as "a fast, tricky inside forward whose style of play was always going to be a crowd pleaser" and a player that was "instantly recognisable... with his blond hair and red boots."

== Career statistics ==
Appearances and goals by club, season and competition
Club	Season	League			FA Cup		Other		Total	
Club	Season	Division	Apps	Goals	Apps	Goals	Apps	Goals	Apps	Goals
Preston North End	1970–71	Third Division	0	0	0	0	0	0	0	0
Southport	1971–72	Fourth Division	27	2	0	0	0	0	27	2
Southport	1972–73	Fourth Division	31	5	1	0	2	1	34	6
Southport	1973–74	Third Division	25	4	1	0	0	0	26	4
Southport	Total		83	11	2	0	2	1	87	12
Dallas Tornado	1975	NASL	20	5	—		—		20	5
Altrincham	1975–76	Northern Premier League	41	18	1	1	3	1	45	20
Altrincham	1976–77	Northern Premier League	27	12	2	0	12	5	41	17
Altrincham	Total		68	30	3	1	15	6	86	37
Port Vale	1977–78	Third Division	13	0	0	0	0	0	13	0
Port Vale	1978–79	Third Division	0	0	0	0	1	0	1	0
Port Vale	Total		13	0	0	0	1	0	14	0
Wigan Athletic	1978–79	Fourth Division	41	9	2	1	0	0	43	10
Wigan Athletic	1979–80	Fourth Division	23	3	1	0	1	0	25	3
Wigan Athletic	Total		64	12	3	1	1	0	68	13
Southport	1982–83	Northern Premier League	1	1	0	0	2	0	3	1

== Honours ==
Southport

- Football League Fourth Division: 1972–73
