= 1970–71 Northern Premier League =

Northern Premier League
- Season: 1970–71
- Champions: Wigan Athletic
- Promoted: None
- Relegated: None
- Matches: 462
- Goals: 1,466 (3.17 per match)
- Biggest home win: Wigan Athletic 7–0 Goole Town (22 August 1970)
- Biggest away win: Fleetwood 1–6 Great Harwood (30 January 1971); Great Harwood 0–5 Fleetwood (8 March 1971)
- Highest scoring: Great Harwood 5–7 Stafford Rangers (31 October 1970)
- Longest winning run: 9 matches Northwich Victoria (13 February 1971 – 9 April 1971)
- Longest unbeaten run: 16 matches Wigan Athletic (9 October 1970 – 20 February 1971)
- Longest winless run: 14 matches Kirkby Town (13 February 1971 – 28 April 1971)
- Longest losing run: 6 matches Runcorn (15 August 1970 – 5 September 1970) Netherfield (23 September 1970 – 23 October 1970) Goole Town (28 December 1970 – 20 February 1971)

The 1970–71 Northern Premier League was the third season of the Northern Premier League, a regional football league in Northern England, the northern areas of the Midlands and North Wales. The season began on 15 August 1970 and concluded on 8 May 1971.

== Overview ==
The League was expanded this season, for the first time, from twenty teams to twenty-two teams.

=== Team changes ===
The following two clubs left the League at the end of the previous season:

- Hyde United resigned, demoted to Cheshire County League
- Gateshead relegated to Wearside Football League

The following four clubs joined the League at the start of the season:

- Bradford Park Avenue relegated from Football League Fourth Division.
- Chorley promoted from Lancashire Combination (returning after a year's absence)
- Kirkby Town promoted from Lancashire Combination
- Lancaster City promoted from Lancashire Combination

=== League table ===
Pos	Team	Pld	W	D	L	GF	GA	GR	Pts
1	Wigan Athletic (C)	42	27	13	2	91	32	2.844	67
2	Stafford Rangers	42	27	7	8	87	51	1.706	61
3	Scarborough	42	23	12	7	83	40	2.075	58
4	Boston United	42	22	12	8	69	31	2.226	56
5	Macclesfield Town	42	23	10	9	84	45	1.867	56
6	Northwich Victoria	42	22	5	15	71	55	1.291	49
7	Bangor City	42	19	10	13	72	61	1.180	48
8	Altrincham	42	19	10	13	80	76	1.053	48
9	South Liverpool	42	15	15	12	67	57	1.175	45
10	Chorley	42	14	14	14	58	61	0.951	42
11	Gainsborough Trinity	42	15	11	16	65	63	1.032	41
12	Morecambe	42	14	11	17	67	79	0.848	39
13	South Shields	42	12	14	16	67	66	1.015	38
14	Bradford Park Avenue	42	15	8	19	54	73	0.740	38
15	Lancaster City	42	12	12	18	53	76	0.697	36
16	Netherfield	42	13	9	20	59	57	1.035	35
17	Matlock Town	42	10	13	19	58	80	0.725	33
18	Fleetwood	42	10	11	21	56	90	0.622	31
19	Great Harwood	42	8	13	21	66	98	0.673	29
20	Runcorn	42	10	5	27	58	84	0.690	25
21	Kirkby Town	42	6	13	23	57	93	0.613	25
22	Goole Town	42	10	4	28	44	98	0.449	24

Updated to match(es) played on 8 May 1971. Source: The Football Archives
Rules for classification: 1) points; 2) goal average; 3) number of goals scored.

The system of using goal average to separate two teams tied on points was used up until the 1976–77 season.

The points system up until the 1982–83 season: 2 points for a win, 1 point for a draw and 0 points for losing.
(C) Champions

=== Results ===
Home \ Away	ALT	BAN	BOS	BPA	CHO	FLE	GAI	GOO	GHA	KIR	LNC	MAC	MAT	MOR	NET	NOR	RUN	SCA	SLI	SSH	STA	WIG
Altrincham		3–1	0–0	1–0	4–4	1–0	2–0	3–0	4–2	5–0	2–2	0–3	2–0	3–2	5–0	0–3	3–1	0–1	3–2	2–3	3–2	1–1
Bangor City	2–0		1–0	2–1	4–2	4–0	2–1	3–0	0–0	4–1	1–3	0–1	2–2	6–0	1–0	3–1	3–2	1–1	1–0	1–3	0–1	2–5
Boston United	1–1	2–2		0–0	0–1	4–0	1–1	2–0	0–0	5–2	5–1	2–1	1–1	3–1	1–0	4–0	2–0	3–1	2–0	0–0	1–0	2–1
Bradford Park Avenue	4–1	2–2	1–2		0–1	2–2	1–0	2–1	2–1	2–1	1–4	0–1	4–1	4–0	0–2	0–2	3–1	0–1	2–2	2–1	1–2	1–1
Chorley	1–1	1–1	1–0	3–0		2–3	3–1	4–1	2–0	2–1	2–1	3–2	1–1	2–3	0–0	2–1	1–2	2–2	0–1	1–1	1–1	1–1
Fleetwood	2–3	0–1	0–3	5–0	2–0		0–1	1–3	1–6	1–0	0–1	3–1	4–1	1–1	1–1	1–0	1–1	2–3	2–2	1–1	2–3	1–1
Gainsborough Trinity	4–1	1–0	0–1	2–2	1–1	5–1		2–2	5–0	2–3	1–2	1–4	2–0	2–3	0–0	1–2	1–0	1–1	2–1	1–1	0–3	2–2
Goole Town	1–2	1–1	0–2	0–1	1–0	4–1	1–2		3–1	0–1	1–2	0–2	1–2	1–0	2–1	2–0	2–0	0–4	0–0	1–0	1–5	0–1
Great Harwood	1–1	3–4	0–4	2–3	2–3	0–5	2–1	6–2		2–2	2–1	1–2	2–0	2–2	1–1	0–4	2–2	1–1	2–2	1–3	5–7	2–2
Kirkby Town	4–5	0–1	0–3	1–3	1–3	2–2	1–1	5–2	1–1		1–2	2–2	1–1	1–2	1–3	2–2	1–0	1–1	0–0	1–1	0–3	1–3
Lancaster City	1–3	1–1	0–3	0–1	2–1	1–1	0–2	1–1	0–1	2–2		0–0	1–1	1–0	2–1	2–6	1–0	1–2	1–3	4–1	1–0	0–0
Macclesfield Town	2–3	3–0	1–1	4–0	2–0	6–0	2–2	4–1	2–3	0–1	2–2		1–0	1–0	3–1	4–4	3–1	4–0	1–2	2–1	2–1	1–3
Matlock Town	1–1	2–2	0–1	1–1	1–1	0–0	3–2	4–1	3–1	2–2	5–1	0–2		2–2	0–0	1–2	3–2	3–1	3–1	3–2	1–2	0–4
Morecambe	2–1	4–1	1–0	0–2	0–3	6–2	1–2	4–3	2–0	5–0	1–1	2–2	3–2		3–3	0–2	2–2	1–3	0–1	1–1	1–3	0–0
Netherfield	4–2	2–3	0–0	1–3	0–0	1–3	0–2	4–0	4–1	2–1	5–2	0–2	6–0	2–0		0–1	3–1	1–2	0–2	2–1	0–1	1–2
Northwich Victoria	3–0	2–1	1–0	3–0	1–1	1–2	3–1	3–0	1–2	2–1	3–2	1–4	4–0	0–0	3–2		1–0	0–2	2–1	2–0	0–1	1–2
Runcorn	1–3	3–4	2–3	2–1	5–0	2–0	2–2	5–1	2–1	2–1	2–0	0–1	2–5	0–3	1–0	0–1		3–2	0–2	1–1	0–1	1–4
Scarborough	1–1	2–0	2–1	4–0	2–0	6–0	1–2	3–1	4–0	3–1	2–1	1–0	4–0	5–0	0–0	2–0	3–2		6–0	1–1	0–0	0–2
South Liverpool	6–0	1–0	2–2	1–1	1–1	4–1	0–1	2–0	4–4	2–1	2–2	1–1	3–1	1–3	0–2	2–0	4–2	1–1		3–0	1–1	0–1
South Shields	5–2	1–2	3–1	5–1	4–0	0–0	3–2	1–2	2–1	3–4	0–0	1–1	1–0	2–3	1–3	2–2	5–2	0–0	1–1		3–0	1–2
Stafford Rangers	2–1	3–2	1–1	4–0	3–1	2–1	0–3	4–1	1–1	3–2	4–1	1–1	2–1	2–2	2–1	4–1	1–0	2–1	3–2	5–0		0–1
Wigan Athletic	1–1	0–0	2–0	3–0	1–0	4–1	5–0	7–0	3–1	3–3	4–0	0–1	2–1	4–1	1–0	1–0	3–1	1–1	1–1	2–1	4–1	

Updated to match(es) played on 8 May 1971. Source: The Football Archives
Legend: Blue = home team win; Yellow = draw; Red = away team win.

=== Stadia and locations ===
Locations of the 1970–71 Northern Premier League teams

Team	Stadium
Altrincham	Moss Lane
Bangor City	Farrar Road
Boston United	York Street
Bradford Park Avenue	Park Avenue
Chorley	Victory Park
Fleetwood	Highbury
Gainsborough Trinity	The Northolme
Goole Town	Victoria Pleasure Ground
Great Harwood	The Showground
Kirkby Town	Simonswood Lane
Lancaster City	Great Axe
Macclesfield Town	Moss Rose
Matlock Town	Causeway Lane
Morecambe	Christie Park
Netherfield	Parkside
Northwich Victoria	Drill Field
Runcorn	Canal Street
Scarborough	Athletic Ground
South Liverpool	Holly Park
South Shields	Simonside Hall
Stafford Rangers	Marston Road
Wigan Athletic	Springfield Park

== Cup results ==
=== Challenge Cup ===
Stage	Home team	Score	Away team	Venue	Notes
1st Leg	Fleetwood Town	2-2	Macclesfield Town	Highbury	scorers for Fleetwood Armstrong and Morley
2nd Leg	Macclesfield Town	0-0	Fleetwood Town	Moss Rose	
Replay	Fleetwood Town	1–0	Macclesfield Town	Springfield Park (Wigan Athletic)	scorer Tony Hallam assist Derek Armstrong

=== FA Cup ===
Out of the twenty-two clubs from the Northern Premier League, only Wigan Athletic reached for the second round:

Second Round

Home team	Score	Away team
Wigan Athletic	2–1	Peterborough United

Third Round

Home team	Score	Away team
Manchester City	1–0	Wigan Athletic

=== FA Trophy ===
Out of the twenty-two clubs from the Northern Premier League, only Macclesfield Town reached for the fourth round:

Fourth Round

Home team	Score	Away team
Hereford United	2–0	Macclesfield Town

== End of the season ==
At the end of the third season of the Northern Premier League none of the teams put forward, for election, received enough votes to be promoted to the Football League. Conversely, none of the sides were relegated.

=== Football League elections ===
Alongside the four Football League clubs facing re-election, a total of twelve non-League clubs applied for election, three of which were from the Northern Premier League. All four Football League teams were re-elected.

Club	League	Votes
Lincoln City	Football League	47
Barrow	Football League	38
Hartlepool	Football League	33
Newport County	Football League	33
Wigan Athletic	Northern Premier League	14
Cambridge City	Southern League	2
Telford United	Southern League	2
Yeovil Town	Southern League	2
Boston United	Northern Premier League	1
Romford	Southern League	1
Bradford Park Avenue	Northern Premier League	1
Gateshead	Wearside League	1
Bedford Town	Southern League	0
Chelmsford City	Southern League	0
Hillingdon Borough	Southern League	0
Kettering Town	Southern League	0

=== Promotion and relegation ===
The League expanding from twenty-two clubs to twenty-four clubs for the following season.

The following two clubs joined the League the following season:

- Skelmersdale United promoted from Cheshire County League
- Ellesmere Port Town promoted from Cheshire County League.
