= 1982 Canberra City FC season =

Canberra City
1982 season
- Head Coach: George Murray
- Stadium: Bruce Stadium
- National Soccer League: 15th
- NSL Cup: Semi-finals
- Top goalscorer: League: Ian Purdie (9); All: Ian Purdie (9)
- Highest home attendance: 3,800 vs. APIA Leichhardt (26 April 1982); National Soccer League
- Lowest home attendance: 550 vs. Brisbane City (8 August 1982); National Soccer League
- Average home league attendance: 2,120
- Biggest win: 2–0 (3 times); 3–2 (twice)
- Biggest defeat: 1–5 vs. Preston Makedonia (A) (21 March 1982); National Soccer League; 0–4 vs. South Melbourne (H) (11 July 1982); National Soccer League
Home colours	Away colours

The 1982 season was the sixth in the history of Canberra City Football Club. In addition to the domestic league, they also participated in the NSL Cup. Canberra City finished 15th in their National Soccer League season, and were eliminated in the semi-finals of the NSL Cup.

== Players ==
Note: Flags indicate national team as defined under FIFA eligibility rules; some limited exceptions apply. Players may hold more than one non-FIFA nationality.

No.	Pos.	Nation	Player
1	GK	AUS	Steve Hoszowski
2	DF	RSA	Paul Ontong
3	DF	AUS	Terry Byrne (captain)
4	MF	AUS	Gary Byrne
5	DF	AUS	Milan Milovanovic
6	MF	AUS	Ian Stone
7	MF	SCO	Ian Gibson
8	FW	SCO	Ian Purdie
9	FW	AUS	Tony Brennan

No.	Pos.	Nation	Player
10	FW	SCO	Don Maclaren
11	FW	AUS	Alan Reis
12	MF	AUS	Angelo Ambrosino
13	DF	AUS	John Moutsopoulos
14	MF	AUS	George Christopoulos
15	DF	AUS	Jim Murray
16	DF	ENG	Steve Bryant
—	MF	AUS	Walter Valeri

== Competitions ==
=== Overall record ===
Competition	First match	Last match	Starting round	Final position	Record							
Competition	First match	Last match	Starting round	Final position	Pld	W	D	L	GF	GA	GD	Win %
National Soccer League	13 February 1982	5 September 1982	Matchday 1	15th	30	7	10	13	37	54	−17	23.33
NSL Cup	14 June 1982	11 August 1982	First round	Semi-finals	3	2	0	1	6	5	+1	66.67
Total					33	9	10	14	43	59	−16	27.27

Source: Competitions

=== National Soccer League ===
==== League table ====
Pos	Team	Pld	W	D	L	GF	GA	GD	Pts	Relegation
1	Sydney City (C)	30	20	5	5	68	28	+40	45	Qualification to Finals series (Note: The Finals series was not considered the championship for the 1982 National Soccer League.)
2	St George-Budapest	30	14	8	8	47	40	+7	36	Qualification to Finals series
3	Wollongong City	30	16	3	11	43	46	−3	35	Qualification to Finals series
4	Heidelberg United	30	13	8	9	42	37	+5	34	Qualification to Finals series
5	Preston Makedonia	30	12	10	8	45	41	+4	34	
6	South Melbourne	30	11	9	10	46	37	+9	31	
7	APIA Leichhardt	30	12	7	11	49	54	−5	31	
8	Sydney Olympic	30	12	6	12	52	42	+10	30	
9	West Adelaide	30	10	8	12	44	40	+4	28	
10	Marconi Fairfield	30	12	4	14	44	43	+1	28	
11	Brisbane Lions	30	10	8	12	39	42	−3	28	
12	Newcastle KB United	30	10	7	13	43	52	−9	27	
13	Adelaide City	30	6	12	12	36	44	−8	24	
14	Footscray JUST	30	5	14	11	34	46	−12	24	
15	Canberra City	30	7	10	13	37	54	−17	24	
16	Brisbane City	30	5	11	14	32	55	−23	21	

Source: rsssf.com
Rules for classification: 1) points; 2) goal difference; 3) number of goals scored.
(C) Champions

==== Results summary ====
Overall								Home						Away					
Pld	W	D	L	GF	GA	GD	Pts	W	D	L	GF	GA	GD	W	D	L	GF	GA	GD
30	7	10	13	37	54	−17	31	5	4	6	21	24	−3	2	6	7	16	30	−14

Source: worldfootball.net

==== Results by round ====
Round	1	2	3	4	5	6	7	8	9	10	11	12	13	14	15	16	17	18	19	20	21	22	23	24	25	26	27	28	29	30
Ground	H	A	H	A	H	A	H	A	H	A	H	A	H	A	H	H	A	H	A	H	A	H	A	H	A	H	A	H	A	A
Result	L	L	W	D	D	L	L	D	W	D	D	W	D	D	L	L	W	W	D	D	L	L	L	L	L	W	D	W	L	L
Position	13	14	10	11	11	12	13	14	12	12	11	10	10	10	11	13	12	10	10	9	12	13	14	14	15	15	14	13	14	15
Points	0	0	3	4	5	5	5	6	8	9	10	12	13	14	14	14	16	18	19	20	20	20	20	20	20	22	23	25	25	25

Source: worldfootball.net
A = Away; H = Home; W = Win; D = Draw; L = Loss

==== Matches ====
Win Draw Loss

13 February 1982 1	Canberra City	1–3	Heidelberg United	Canberra
	Gibson 17'	Report	Cole 15', 76'; Campbell 87'	Stadium: Bruce Stadium; Attendance: 2,500; Referee: Bob Mee

21 February 1982 2	St George-Budapest	1–0	Canberra City	Sydney
	Barton 69'	Report		Stadium: St George Stadium; Attendance: 1,874; Referee: Gary Power

28 February 1982 3	Canberra City	3–1	Adelaide City	Canberra
	Purdie 57'; Gibson 66'; MacLaren 81'	Report	J. Nyskohus 84'	Stadium: Bruce Stadium; Attendance: 2,200; Referee: Ken Allen

7 March 1982 4	Marconi Fairfield	2–2	Canberra City	Sydney
	Jankovics 36'; Hunter 81'	Report	T. Byrne ?'; Purdie 65'	Stadium: Marconi Stadium; Attendance: 4,039; Referee: Peter Rampley

14 March 1982 5	Canberra City	2–2	Brisbane Lions	Canberra
	Valeri 35'; Brennan 43'	Report	Williamson 81', 85'	Stadium: Bruce Stadium; Attendance: 2,250; Referee: Bob Mee

21 March 1982 6	Preston Makedonia	5–1	Canberra City	Melbourne
	Ward 24', 59'; Brown 36' (pen.), 88'; Boyle 61'	Report	Brennan 20'	Stadium: B.T. Connor Reserve; Attendance: 4,500; Referee: David Yelland

28 March 1982 7	Canberra City	0–1	Wollongong City	Canberra
		Report	Cotton 56'	Stadium: Bruce Stadium; Attendance: 2,000; Referee: Ken Allen

4 April 1982 8	South Melbourne	1–1	Canberra City	Melbourne
	Buljevic 35'	Report	Brennan 85'	Stadium: Middle Park Soccer Stadium; Attendance: 4,000; Referee: Jim Fearn

12 April 1982 9	Canberra City	2–0	Sydney City	Canberra
	Maclaren 60'; Cant 81' (o.g.)	Report		Stadium: Bruce Stadium; Attendance: 3,100; Referee: Dave Nugent

18 April 1982 10	West Adelaide	2–2	Canberra City	Adelaide
	Manecas 44'; Brown 75'	Report	Purdie 59'; T. Byrne 75'	Stadium: Hindmarsh Stadium; Attendance: 2,800; Referee: Bob Kerr

26 April 1982 11	Canberra City	2–2	APIA Leichhardt	Canberra
	Christopoulos 17'; T. Byrne 73'	Report	Soper 47'; Bradley 75'	Stadium: Bruce Stadium; Attendance: 3,800; Referee: Bob Mee

2 May 1982 12	Brisbane City	1–3	Canberra City	Brisbane
	Carey ?'	Report	T. Byrne ?'; Purdie ?'; MacLaren ?'	Stadium: Spencer Park; Attendance: 1,800; Referee: Bill Monteverde

9 May 1982 13	Canberra City	2–2	Footscray JUST	Canberra
	Purdie 23'; T. Byrne 48'	Report	Lujic 29'; Ristovski 39'	Stadium: Bruce Stadium; Attendance: 2,500; Referee: Bob Mee

16 May 1982 14	Sydney Olympic	0–0	Canberra City	Sydney
		Report		Stadium: Pratten Park; Attendance: 8,750; Referee: Doug Rennie

23 May 1982 15	Canberra City	1–3	Newcastle KB United	Canberra
	Purdie 21'	Report	Hamilton 34'; Senkalski 35'; McClelland ?'	Stadium: Bruce Stadium; Attendance: 2,000; Referee: Ken Allen

30 May 1982 16	Canberra City	1–2	St George-Budapest	Canberra
	Maclaren 30'	Report	Barton 7'; Marton 81'	Stadium: Bruce Stadium; Attendance: 1,400; Referee: Ken Allen

6 June 1982 17	Heidelberg United	1–2	Canberra City	Melbourne
	Cole 61'	Report	Gibson 5', 68'	Stadium: Olympic Village; Attendance: 3,500; Referee: David Yelland

13 June 1982 18	Canberra City	2–0	Marconi Fairfield	Canberra
	T. Byrne 58'; Stone 63'	Report		Stadium: Bruce Stadium; Attendance: 2,000; Referee: Ken Small

20 June 1982 19	Adelaide City	1–1	Canberra City	Adelaide
	J. Nyskohus 87'	Report	Purdie 62'	Stadium: Olympic Sports Field; Attendance: 1,900; Referee: Bob Kerr

27 June 1982 20	Canberra City	1–1	Preston Makedonia	Canberra
	Bryant 84'	Report	Lucchesi 1'	Stadium: Bruce Stadium; Attendance: 2,000; Referee: Bob Mee

4 July 1982 21	Wollongong City	3–0	Canberra City	Wollongong
	O'Connor 53'; Adam 56' (pen.); Dunleavy 65'	Report		Stadium: Wollongong Showground; Attendance: 3,148; Referee: Gary Power

11 July 1992 22	Canberra City	0–4	South Melbourne	Canberra
15:00 AEST		Report	Davidson ?'; Egan 52', 89'; Buljevic 90'	Stadium: Bruce Stadium; Attendance: 2,000; Referee: Richard Lorenc

18 July 1982 23	Sydney City	3–0	Canberra City	Sydney
	Barnes 7'; Mitchell 23'; Borges 72'	Report		Stadium: ES Marks Athletics Field; Attendance: 1,450; Referee: Rob Davies

25 July 1982 24	Canberra City	1–2	West Adelaide	Canberra
	Christopoulos 52'	Report	Honeyman 15'; Sumner 17'	Stadium: Bruce Stadium; Attendance: 1,500; Referee: Peter Rampley

1 August 1982 25	APIA Leichhardt	3–0	Canberra City	Sydney
	Jones 4', 81'; McBreen ?'	Report		Stadium: Lambert Park; Attendance: 2,403; Referee: Jim Reeves

8 August 1982 26	Canberra City	1–0	Brisbane City	Canberra
	Maclaren 77'	Report		Stadium: Bruce Stadium; Attendance: 550; Referee: Doug Rennie

15 August 1982 27	Footscray JUST	2–2	Canberra City	Melbourne
	Kojic 1'; Kyriakouleas 71'	Report	G. Byrne 25'; Brennan 43'	Stadium: Schintler Reserve; Attendance: 2,000; Referee: Dennis Voutsinas

22 August 1982 28	Canberra City	2–1	Sydney Olympic	Canberra
	Christopoulos 55'; Purdie 84'	Report	Wilson 59'	Stadium: Bruce Stadium; Attendance: 2,000; Referee: Don Campbell

28 August 1982 29	Newcastle KB United	4–2	Canberra City	Newcastle
	Senkalski 23'; Drinkwater 37'; Drysdale 47', 56'	Report		Stadium: Newcastle International Sports Centre; Attendance: 3,200; Referee: Jim Reeves

5 September 1982 30	Brisbane Lions	1–0	Canberra City	Brisbane
	Williamson 29'	Report		Stadium: Richlands Stadium; Attendance: 400; Referee: Dave Nugent

=== NSL Cup ===
14 June 1982 First round	Canberra City	3–2	St George-Budapest	Canberra
	Gibson ?'; Stone 79'; Reis 90'	Report	Marton 52'; Slater 75'	Stadium: Bruce Stadium; Attendance: 1,800; Referee: Bob Mee

14 July 1982 Second round	West Adelaide	0–2	Canberra City	Adelaide
		Report	Stone 38'; Christopoulos 86'	Stadium: Hindmarsh Stadium; Referee: Don Campbell

11 August 1982 Quarter-finals	Heidelberg United	3–1	Canberra City	Melbourne
	Taylor 12'; Valentine 14'; Cole 26' (pen.)	Report	Gibson 57'	Stadium: Olympic Park; Attendance: 1,000; Referee: Chris Bambridge

== Statistics ==
=== Appearances and goals ===
Includes all competitions. Players with no appearances not included in the list.

No.	Pos	Nat	Player	Total		National Soccer League		NSL Cup	
No.	Pos	Nat	Player	Apps	Goals	Apps	Goals	Apps	Goals
1	GK	(Australia) AUS	Steve Hoszowski	33	0	30	0	3	0
2	DF	(South Africa) RSA	Paul Ontong	24	0	21	0	3	0
3	DF	(Australia) AUS	Terry Byrne	31	6	28	6	3	0
4	MF	(Australia) AUS	Gary Byrne	31	1	28	1	3	0
5	DF	(Australia) AUS	Milan Milanovic	27	0	24	0	3	0
6	MF	(Australia) AUS	Ian Stone	29	3	20+6	1	2+1	2
7	MF	(Scotland) SCO	Ian Gibson	32	6	28+1	4	3	2
8	FW	(Scotland) SCO	Ian Purdie	24	9	17+6	9	1	0
9	FW	(Australia) AUS	Tony Brennan	28	4	26	4	2	0
10	FW	(Scotland) SCO	Don Maclaren	28	6	21+4	6	2+1	0
11	FW	(Australia) AUS	Alan Reis	8	1	1+6	0	0+1	1
12	MF	(Australia) AUS	Angelo Ambrosino	26	0	23+1	0	2	0
13	DF	(Australia) AUS	John Moutsopoulos	12	0	11+1	0	0	0
14	MF	(Australia) AUS	George Christopoulos	25	4	22	3	3	1
15	DF	(Australia) AUS	Jim Murray	15	0	14	0	1	0
16	DF	(England) ENG	Steve Bryant	13	1	10+1	1	2	0
	MF	(Australia) AUS	Walter Valeri	8	1	6+2	1	0	0
