= Noel Ward =

Northern Irish footballer

Personal information
- Full name: Noel Gerard Ward
- Date of birth: 8 December 1952 (age 73)
- Place of birth: Donemana, Northern Ireland
- Height: 6 ft 2 1/2 in (1.89 m)
- Position: Defender

Senior career*
Years	Team	Apps	(Gls)
- Derry City
1972–1974	Portadown		
1974–1976	Aberdeen	7	(0)
1976–1980	Wigan Athletic	134	(11)
Total		141	(11)
- * Club domestic league appearances and goals

Noel Gerard Ward (born 8 December 1952) is a Northern Irish former footballer who played as a defender.

Born in Donemana, County Tyrone, Ward started his career at Derry City, helping the club reach the final of the 1970–71 Irish Cup, but were ultimately defeated 3-0 by Distillery. Following Derry's withdrawal from the Irish league, Ward moved to Portadown in 1972. He played in the 1972–73 Gold Cup final, which Portadown lost 2–0 against Linfield.

Ward joined Aberdeen in 1974, but made only seven first team appearances in two seasons for the club. He signed for Wigan Athletic in 1976, making over 100 appearances for the club, and helping Wigan gain election to the Football League in 1978. In 1979, Ward broke his leg in a match against Portsmouth, an injury which prematurely ended his career. In 1982, he was awarded a testimonial match by Wigan, which was played against Chelsea.

== Career statistics ==
Appearances and goals by club, season and competition
Club	Season	League			National Cup		League Cup		Other		Total	
Club	Season	Division	Apps	Goals	Apps	Goals	Apps	Goals	Apps	Goals	Apps	Goals
Aberdeen	1974–75	Division One	5	0	0	0	0	0	0	0	5	0
Aberdeen	1975–76	Premier Division	2	0	0	0	0	0	0	0	2	0
Aberdeen	Total		7	0	0	0	0	0	0	0	7	0
Wigan Athletic	1976–77	Northern Premier League	42	2							42	2
Wigan Athletic	1977–78	Northern Premier League	44	5							44	5
Wigan Athletic	1978–79	Fourth Division	44	4	2	0	2	0	0	0	48	4
Wigan Athletic	1979–80	Fourth Division	4	0	0	0	2	0	0	0	6	0
Wigan Athletic	Total		134	11	2	0	4	0	0	0	140	11
Career total			509	198	20	10	35	16	21	9	585	233
