= Derek Brownbill =

English footballer (born 1954)

Personal information
- Full name: Derek Anthony Brownbill
- Date of birth: 4 February 1954 (age 72)
- Place of birth: Liverpool, England
- Height: 5 ft 9 in (1.75 m)
- Position: Forward

Youth career
- 1970–1972: Liverpool

Senior career*
Years	Team	Apps	(Gls)
1972–1974	Liverpool	1	(0)
1975–1978	Port Vale	92	(13)
1978	Cleveland Cobras	21	(5)
1978–1980	Wigan Athletic	48	(8)
1980–198?	Stafford Rangers		
198?–1982	Oswestry Town		
1982–?	Morecambe		
	Witton Albion	0	(0)
1986–1987	Warrington Town	2	(2)
Total		164+	(28+)

Managerial career
- 1989–1995: Warrington Town
- Curzon Ashton
- * Club domestic league appearances and goals

Derek Anthony Brownbill (born 4 February 1954) is an English former footballer who played as a forward. He played in the Football League for Liverpool, Port Vale, and Wigan Athletic before spells with American side Cleveland Cobras and English non-League clubs Stafford Rangers, Oswestry Town, Morecambe, Witton Albion, and Warrington Town. He managed Warrington Town for six seasons, winning the North West Counties Football League Division One title in 1989–90.

== Playing career ==
=== Liverpool ===
Brownbill came through the youth ranks at Liverpool to turn professional at the age of 18; he featured in the 1972 FA Youth Cup final defeat to Aston Villa. He made his only appearance for the senior team on 15 September 1973, in a 1–1 draw with Birmingham City at St Andrew's.

=== Port Vale ===
Brownbill joined Port Vale for £5,000 in February 1975. Liverpool manager Bob Paisley rejected a bid of £20,000 from Bury because he had already made a verbal agreement with Vale coach Reg Berks. Brownbill scored his first senior goal in a 1–0 home win over Charlton Athletic on 3 March, when he headed in a free-kick from John Brodie. Brownbill finished the 1974–75 season with four goals in 16 Third Division appearances. He hit nine goals in 41 games in 1975–76, including five in the FA Cup. He scored the equalising goal in a 2–2 draw with Southern League side Grantham in which he had been standing offside. He then scored all four goals in the replay, a 4–1 win. He was named as Vale's clubman of the year.

He lost his first-team place in August 1976, and scored three goals in 23 games in 1976–77. Manager Roy Sproson was sacked in October 1977, however, Brownbill failed to re-establish himself in the first XI under new boss Bobby Smith; he went on to score three goals in 28 appearances in 1977–78. During his time at Vale Park the crowd used to barrack him for being big and clumsy, when in fact it was part of Roy Sproson's plan for Brownbill to shield the ball and allow attacking midfielders Brian Horton and Terry Bailey to get forward and score goals (Horton and Bailey got 27 goals between them in 1974–75 with Brownbill's support).

=== Cleveland Cobras ===
Handed a free transfer in May 1978, he emigrated to the US with the Cleveland Cobras of the American Soccer League. He played 21 games, scoring five goals and claiming five assists.

=== Wigan Athletic ===
He returned to the UK with Wigan Athletic in September 1978. He came on as a substitute in the club's first game in the Football League, a 3–0 win over Rochdale on 13 September at Springfield Park. He had 20 starts and 17 substitute appearances in 1978–79, scoring six goals for Ian McNeill's "Latics". Wigan finished the 1979–80 season in sixth place in the Fourth Division.

=== Later career ===
He later moved on to various non-League clubs: Stafford Rangers, Oswestry Town, Morecambe and Witton Albion, before becoming the player and later manager of North West Counties Football League Division Two club Warrington Town.

== Managerial career ==
He spent six seasons in charge at Warrington Town, winning the North West Counties Football League Division One title in the 1989–90 campaign. He later became the manager of Curzon Ashton. He was the Director of Football at Warrington Town until 2009.

== Career statistics ==
=== Club ===
Appearances and goals by club, season and competition
Club	Season	League			FA Cup		Other		Total	
Club	Season	Division	Apps	Goals	Apps	Goals	Apps	Goals	Apps	Goals
Liverpool	1973–74	First Division	1	0	0	0	0	0	1	0
Port Vale	1974–75	Third Division	16	4	0	0	0	0	16	4
Port Vale	1975–76	Third Division	36	4	3	5	2	0	41	9
Port Vale	1976–77	Third Division	19	2	2	1	2	0	23	3
Port Vale	1977–78	Third Division	21	3	4	0	3	0	28	3
Port Vale	Total		92	13	9	6	7	0	108	19
Cleveland Cobras	1978	ASL	21	5	0	0	0	0	21	5
Wigan Athletic	1978–79	Fourth Division	30	6	1	0	0	0	31	6
Wigan Athletic	1979–80	Fourth Division	18	2	3	1	2	0	23	3
Wigan Athletic	Total		48	8	4	1	2	0	54	9
Warrington Town	1986–87	NWCFL Division Two	2	2	0	0	7	1	9	3

=== Managerial ===
Managerial record by team and tenure
Team	From	To	Record					Ref.
Team	From	To	P	W	D	L	Win %	Ref.
Warrington Town	1 June 1989	31 May 1995	337	163	73	101	48.37	

== Honours ==
=== Playing ===
Liverpool

- FA Youth Cup runner-up: 1972

=== Managerial ===
Warrington Town

- North West Counties Football League Division One: 1989–90
