= Worswick =

Worswick is a toponymic surname of Old English origin. It refers to the village of Urswick, Lancashire, England. The name Urswick itself comes from a previous place name, Urse, meaning 'bison lake', combined with wick, meaning 'specialized farmstead.'

Notable people with the surname include:

- G.D.N. Worswick (David Worswick) (1916–2001), British economist
- Micky Worswick (born 1945), English footballer
- Ross Worswick (born 1989), British TV personality
- Beauleen Carl-Worswick (born 1962), Micronesian judge
