= Fretwell =

Fretwell is a surname which may refer to:

- David Fretwell (born 1952), English footballer
- Des Fretwell (born 1955), British cyclist
- Elbert K. Fretwell (1878–1962), American professor of education
- Elbert K. Fretwell Jr. (1923–2012), American academic and university chancellor
- Elizabeth Fretwell (1920–2006), Australian soprano
- Sir John Fretwell (1930–2017), British diplomat
- Stephen Fretwell (born 1981), English singer-songwriter
