= Tony Quinn (footballer) =

English footballer (born 1959)

Personal information
- Full name: Anthony Quinn
- Date of birth: 24 July 1959 (age 67)
- Place of birth: Liverpool, England
- Position: Forward

Youth career
- Liverpool
- Everton
- 1978–1979: Wigan Athletic

Senior career*
Years	Team	Apps	(Gls)
1979–1981	Wigan Athletic	43	(14)
1981-1983	Witton Albion	46	(12)
1985–1988	Southport	81	(18)
1988–1990	Mossley	45	(17)
1990–1991	Southport	9	(1)
- * Club domestic league appearances and goals

Anthony Quinn (born 24 July 1959 in Liverpool) is an English retired footballer who played as a forward for Wigan Athletic, Witton Albion, Southport and Mossley.

Quinn started his career in his hometown, playing as an amateur for Liverpool and then Everton. After failing to make the grade, he signed for Wigan Athletic. Although Quinn didn't appear for the first team during the 1978–79 season, he played in all 38 league games for the reserve team and scored 35 goals, making him the reserve league's leading goalscorer.

In October 1979, Quinn made his first team debut against Lincoln City. He made 43 appearances for the club, scoring 14 goals, before being released in 1981.

Quinn joined Southport in 1985, where he scored 18 times in 81 league appearances before joining Mossley in 1988. He returned to Southport in 1990, appearing a further nine times for the club.
