= 1975–76 Northern Premier League =

Northern Premier League
- Season: 1975–76
- Champions: Runcorn
- Promoted: None
- Relegated: Skelmersdale United
- Matches: 552
- Goals: 1,562 (2.83 per match)
- Biggest home win: Boston United 8–0 Barrow (10 April 1976)
- Biggest away win: Fleetwood 0–6 Northwich Victoria (1 November 1975); Fleetwood 1–7 Worksop Town (10 April 1976)
- Highest scoring: Great Harwood 3–7 Wigan Athletic (5 April 1976)
- Longest winning run: 8 matches Runcorn (22 November 1975 – 27 December 1975); Boston United (24 January 1976 – 24 March 1976)
- Longest unbeaten run: 16 matches Stafford Rangers (28 October 1975 – 14 February 1976)
- Longest winless run: 14 matches Fleetwood (1 November 1975 – 21 February 1976)
- Longest losing run: 7 matches Great Harwood (10 January 1976 – 21 February 1976); Goole Town (28 December 1970 – 20 February 1971)

The 1975–76 Northern Premier League was the eighth season of the Northern Premier League, a regional football league in Northern England, the northern areas of the Midlands and North Wales. The season began on 16 August 1975 and concluded on 1 May 1976.

== Overview ==
The League featured twenty-four teams.

=== Team changes ===
No clubs were promoted, conversely, none of the clubs were relegated.

=== League table ===
Pos	Team	Pld	W	D	L	GF	GA	GR	Pts	Qualification or relegation
1	Runcorn (C)	46	29	10	7	95	42	2.262	68	
2	Stafford Rangers	46	26	15	5	81	41	1.976	67	
3	Scarborough	46	26	10	10	84	43	1.953	62	
4	Matlock Town	46	26	9	11	96	63	1.524	61	
5	Boston United	46	27	6	13	95	58	1.638	60	
6	Wigan Athletic	46	21	15	10	81	42	1.929	57	
7	Altrincham	46	20	14	12	77	57	1.351	54	
8	Bangor City	46	21	12	13	80	70	1.143	54	
9	Mossley	46	21	11	14	70	58	1.207	53	
10	Goole Town	46	20	13	13	58	49	1.184	53	
11	Northwich Victoria	46	17	17	12	79	59	1.339	51	
12	Lancaster City	46	18	9	19	61	70	0.871	45	
13	Worksop Town	46	17	10	19	63	56	1.125	44	
14	Gainsborough Trinity	46	13	17	16	58	69	0.841	43	
15	Macclesfield Town	46	15	12	19	50	64	0.781	42	
16	Gateshead United	46	17	7	22	64	63	1.016	41	
17	Buxton	46	11	13	22	37	62	0.597	35	
18	Skelmersdale United (R)	46	12	10	24	45	74	0.608	34	Relegated to Lancashire Combination
19	Netherfield	46	11	11	24	55	76	0.724	33	
20	Morecambe	46	11	11	24	47	67	0.701	33	
21	Great Harwood	46	13	7	26	58	86	0.674	33	
22	South Liverpool	46	12	9	25	45	78	0.577	33	
23	Barrow	46	12	9	25	47	84	0.560	33	
24	Fleetwood (D, R)	46	3	9	34	36	131	0.275	15	Club folded

Updated to match(es) played on 1 May 1976. Source: The Football Archives
Rules for classification: 1) points; 2) goal average; 3) number of goals scored.

The system of using goal average to separate two teams tied on points was used up until the 1976–77 season.

The points system up until the 1982–83 season: 2 points for a win, 1 point for a draw and 0 points for losing.
(C) Champions; (D) Disqualified; (R) Relegated

=== Results ===
Home \ Away	ALT	BAN	BRW	BOS	BUX	FLE	GAI	GOO	GAT	GHA	LNC	MAC	MAT	MOR	MOS	NET	NOR	RUN	SCA	SKU	SLI	STA	WIG	WOK
Altrincham		1–0	4–0	1–0	4–0	2–1	3–0	1–1	3–0	3–2	2–2	3–2	1–2	4–1	0–0	2–2	1–1	3–1	0–1	3–1	1–1	5–2	1–0	0–1
Bangor City	0–3		3–1	2–2	4–1	2–1	4–2	2–1	3–1	2–3	2–1	0–1	5–1	1–1	3–3	1–0	1–1	0–3	1–1	4–0	5–1	1–0	2–2	3–2
Barrow	1–1	1–2		2–3	1–0	4–0	1–1	1–2	1–0	0–2	1–0	2–0	3–1	1–0	1–2	1–1	1–6	0–2	2–1	0–2	0–1	0–0	0–4	1–1
Boston United	4–1	4–1	8–0		3–1	2–1	1–2	2–1	1–0	4–0	4–2	6–0	2–1	4–1	3–0	3–1	4–1	0–1	2–0	3–2	3–0	2–2	2–1	3–1
Buxton	1–1	0–1	0–0	0–1		1–1	2–2	3–4	1–0	4–1	1–4	1–1	1–1	0–1	0–1	0–1	1–2	1–1	2–1	3–0	2–1	1–0	2–0	0–0
Fleetwood Town	0–1	1–1	2–3	1–1	0–0		0–2	1–1	0–3	2–2	1–3	0–1	1–2	1–0	0–3	0–4	0–6	2–2	0–2	1–4	3–1	0–2	0–4	1–7
Gainsborough Trinity	5–0	1–1	4–2	2–1	0–0	5–1		0–1	3–3	0–2	0–0	3–1	1–0	2–1	1–3	3–1	2–2	0–2	1–1	2–1	3–0	1–1	0–0	1–1
Goole Town	0–3	1–1	1–0	0–0	3–1	5–0	2–1		3–0	1–0	1–1	2–1	1–1	1–1	2–1	2–0	0–3	0–2	2–1	1–0	1–2	1–0	0–0	2–1
Gateshead United	0–2	4–2	1–0	1–0	0–1	8–1	0–0	0–0		1–0	2–1	0–2	5–1	2–0	2–2	1–0	0–1	2–3	2–0	2–2	2–0	0–2	1–2	3–0
Great Harwood	0–3	1–2	2–4	0–1	0–1	2–2	1–1	2–0	1–3		2–3	2–1	1–4	0–1	2–2	2–4	0–4	0–3	1–2	1–0	2–1	0–1	3–7	1–0
Lancaster City	2–1	0–2	3–2	2–3	0–0	7–1	2–1	1–2	0–1	1–5		0–1	4–2	3–2	2–0	3–2	0–0	0–4	2–2	1–0	1–0	0–2	0–0	1–0
Macclesfield Town	2–1	1–2	1–1	1–0	2–1	0–0	2–0	4–3	3–0	3–0	0–1		1–1	0–1	1–1	2–1	1–1	1–2	1–1	0–1	2–0	1–1	1–1	0–0
Matlock Town	4–3	1–1	2–0	4–1	3–1	4–2	3–0	2–0	2–1	3–1	2–0	1–0		4–1	3–0	2–0	2–1	0–1	2–2	1–0	2–2	3–2	2–2	1–2
Morecambe	0–0	0–2	1–2	1–2	1–0	2–0	5–0	2–1	0–1	0–1	1–2	2–0	0–1		0–2	0–1	3–3	1–1	1–2	2–1	2–0	1–1	3–0	0–2
Mossley	0–1	3–1	1–0	1–0	3–0	3–2	0–1	0–1	2–1	4–1	1–0	4–0	0–4	2–2		2–1	1–0	1–0	2–3	0–0	0–0	3–3	1–1	6–2
Netherfield	1–1	0–1	1–1	1–4	0–0	2–1	2–2	0–2	1–6	0–3	0–0	1–1	1–3	2–0	2–0		0–0	0–1	1–1	2–0	6–0	0–1	0–2	1–3
Northwich Victoria	0–0	1–2	1–2	1–3	1–0	4–0	1–1	0–0	1–1	0–0	2–1	1–1	5–3	5–2	5–3	1–2		0–2	1–0	1–1	0–0	3–3	1–3	4–1
Runcorn	6–2	4–1	3–1	0–0	3–0	2–1	2–0	2–0	3–1	2–1	4–0	3–1	1–1	3–1	1–0	4–4	0–1		1–1	6–0	4–2	2–2	2–0	1–2
Scarborough	1–0	4–1	5–0	4–1	1–0	6–1	3–0	1–0	5–1	1–0	3–0	5–2	4–2	1–1	0–0	2–1	1–2	2–0		2–0	4–3	0–1	0–0	3–0
Skelmersdale United	2–2	3–1	2–1	3–1	0–1	1–0	2–1	1–1	1–1	2–1	0–1	2–0	1–6	0–0	0–1	0–2	2–0	1–1	0–1		0–0	1–1	1–2	0–3
South Liverpool	1–1	1–1	2–0	2–0	1–2	2–3	3–0	1–1	2–1	1–3	2–1	1–2	0–3	2–1	1–0	2–0	3–1	0–2	0–1	3–2		0–1	0–0	0–2
Stafford Rangers	2–1	3–2	1–1	2–0	1–0	4–0	4–0	2–1	1–0	1–1	4–0	2–0	1–1	1–1	2–1	4–1	1–1	2–1	1–0	4–1	3–0		2–2	1–0
Wigan Athletic	4–1	2–0	1–0	6–0	6–0	3–0	0–0	1–3	1–0	0–0	1–1	0–1	1–0	0–0	2–3	5–2	1–2	1–1	2–1	4–1	2–0	1–2		3–0
Worksop Town	0–0	1–1	3–1	1–1	0–0	5–0	1–1	0–0	3–0	1–3	1–2	3–1	0–2	3–0	1–2	1–0	3–1	3–0	0–1	0–1	2–0	0–2	0–1	

Updated to match(es) played on 1 May 1976. Source: The Football Archives
Legend: Blue = home team win; Yellow = draw; Red = away team win.

=== Stadia and locations ===
Locations of the 1975–76 Northern Premier League teams

Team	Stadium
Altrincham	Moss Lane
Bangor City	Farrar Road
Barrow	Holker Street
Boston United	York Street
Buxton	The Silverlands
Fleetwood	Highbury
Gainsborough Trinity	The Northolme
Gateshead United	Gateshead Youth Stadium
Goole Town	Victoria Pleasure Ground
Great Harwood	The Showground
Lancaster City	Great Axe
Macclesfield Town	Moss Rose
Matlock Town	Causeway Lane
Morecambe	Christie Park
Mossley	Seel Park
Netherfield	Parkside
Northwich Victoria	Drill Field
Runcorn	Canal Street
Scarborough	Athletic Ground
Skelmersdale United	White Moss Park
South Liverpool	Holly Park
Stafford Rangers	Marston Road
Wigan Athletic	Springfield Park
Worksop Town	Central Avenue

== Cup results ==
=== Challenge Cup ===
Stage	Home team	Score	Away team
1st Leg	Boston United	4–0	Mossley Town
2nd Leg	Mossley Town	1–2	Boston United
Aggregate	Boston United	5–2	Mossley

=== Northern Premier League Shield ===
Between Champions of NPL Premier Division and Winners of the NPL Cup.

Home team	Score	Away team
Boston United	beat	Runcorn

=== FA Cup ===
Out of the twenty-four clubs from the Northern Premier League, only four teams reached for the second round:

Second Round

Home team	Score	Away team	
Sheffield Wednesday	2–0	Wigan Athletic	
Stafford Rangers	1–3	Halifax Town	
Scarborough	3–2	Preston North End	
Gateshead United	1–1	Rochdale	
Rochdale	3–1	Gateshead United	Replay

Third Round

Home team	Score	Away team
Scarborough	1–2	Crystal Palace

=== FA Trophy ===
Out of the twenty-four clubs from the Northern Premier League, three teams reached for the fourth round:

Fourth Round

Home team	Score	Away team
Bedford Town	1–2	Runcorn
Scarborough	1–0	Tooting & Mitcham United
Stafford Rangers	2–0	Hillingdon Borough

Semi-finals

Stage	Home team	Score	Away team
1st Leg	Scarborough	1–0	Enfield
2nd Leg	Enfield	0–0	Scarborough
Aggregate	Scarborough	1–0	Enfield
1st Leg	Stafford Rangers	1–0	Runcorn
2nd Leg	Runcorn	0–0	Stafford Rangers
Aggregate	Stafford Rangers	1–0	Runcorn

Final

Home team	Score	Away team
Scarborough	3–2	Stafford Rangers

== End of the season ==
At the end of the eighth season of the Northern Premier League none of the teams put forward for election received enough votes to be promoted to the Football League. Skelmersdale United resigned and Fleetwood folded.

=== Football League elections ===
Alongside the four Football League teams facing re-election, a total of nine non-League teams applied for election, three of which were from the Northern Premier League. All four Football League teams were re-elected.

Club	League	Votes
Stockport County	Football League	42
Newport County	Football League	41
Southport	Football League	38
Workington	Football League	21
Yeovil Town	Southern League	18
Kettering Town	Southern League	14
Wigan Athletic	Northern Premier League	6
Wimbledon	Southern League	3
Chelmsford City	Southern League	3
Nuneaton Borough	Southern League	2
Telford United	Southern League	2
Gainsborough Trinity	Northern Premier League	1
Scarborough	Northern Premier League	1

=== Promotion and relegation ===
The number of clubs reduced from twenty-four clubs to twenty-three clubs for the following season.

The following two clubs left the League at the end of the season:

- Skelmersdale United resigned, demoted to Lancashire Combination
- Fleetwood folded

The following club joined the League the following season:

- Frickley Athletic promoted from Midland League (1889)
