= George Urquhart =

Scottish footballer

Personal information
- Date of birth: 22 April 1950 (age 76)
- Place of birth: Scotland
- Position: Midfielder

Youth career
- Renfrew Juniors

Senior career*
| Years | Team | Apps | (Gls) |
| 1968–1970 | St Mirren | 14 | (0) |
- Guildford City
- Ross County
| 1979–1981 | Wigan Athletic | 68 | (6) |
| 1982–1984 | Macclesfield Town | 45 | (6) |
- * Club domestic league appearances and goals

George Urquhart (born 22 April 1950) is a Scottish former footballer who played for St Mirren, Guildford City, Ross County, Wigan Athletic and Macclesfield Town.

He works as an agent for a number of high-profile footballers, including Antonio Valencia and Robbie Savage. In 2009, Urquhart was fined £500 by the FA for a breach in regulations relating to Savage's transfer to Derby County.
