= John Curtis (footballer, born 1954) =

English footballer

Personal information
- Date of birth: 2 September 1954 (age 72)
- Place of birth: Poulton-le-Fylde, England
- Position: Defender

Senior career*
Years	Team	Apps	(Gls)
1973–1977	Blackpool	102	(0)
1977–1979	Blackburn Rovers	10	(0)
1979–1981	Wigan Athletic	32	(0)
1981–19??	Morecambe	?	(?)
Total		144	(0)
- * Club domestic league appearances and goals

John Curtis (born 2 September 1954 in Poulton-le-Fylde, Lancashire) is an English former professional footballer. He played as a defender.
