= John Wilkie (footballer) =

Scottish footballer (1947–2023)

Personal information
- Full name: John Carlin Wilkie
- Date of birth: 1 July 1947
- Place of birth: Dundee, Scotland
- Date of death: 26 October 2023 (aged 76)
- Position: Winger

Senior career*
Years	Team	Apps	(Gls)
1965	Brechin City (trialist)	2	(0)
1965–1970	Arbroath	100	(13)
1970–1971	Raith Rovers	7	(1)
1971–1972	Keith		
1972	Greenock Morton	1	(0)
1972–1973	Ross County		
1973–1974	Halifax Town	37	(8)
1974–1976	Elgin City		
1976–1979	Wigan Athletic	92	(33)
- Chorley
- * Club domestic league appearances and goals

John Carlin Wilkie (1 July 1947 – 26 October 2023) was a Scottish footballer. A winger, he played for several clubs in Scotland before signing for Halifax Town in the Football League Third Division in 1973. In 1976, he joined Wigan Athletic following a two-year spell back in Scotland with Elgin City, then in the Scottish Highland Football League. In the 1977–78 season, he was the top goalscorer for the club in the Northern Premier League, helping the club gain election into The Football League.

== Death ==
Wilkie died on 26 October 2023, at the age of 76.
