= Geoff Gay =

English footballer (born 1957)

Personal information
- Full name: Geoffrey Gay
- Date of birth: 4 February 1957 (age 69)
- Place of birth: Romford, England
- Height: 5 ft 10 in (1.78 m)
- Position: Midfielder

Youth career
- 1973–1975: Bolton Wanderers

Senior career*
Years	Team	Apps	(Gls)
1975–1977	Bolton Wanderers	0	(0)
1977	→ Exeter City (loan)	6	(0)
1977–1978	Southport	40	(5)
1978	Wigan Athletic	1	(0)
1978	Macclesfield Town	5	(3)
19??–1979	Bangor City		
1979	Crewe Alexandra	0	(0)
1979–1982	Macclesfield Town	115	(8)
- Mossley
- Droylsden
- Chorley
1986	Macclesfield Town	1	(0)
- Mossley
- Horwich RMI
- * Club domestic league appearances and goals

Geoffrey Gay (born 4 February 1957) is an English former professional footballer. He played in the Football League for Exeter City, Southport and Wigan Athletic. Born in Romford, Gay's family moved to Tarvin and then Winsford in the North-West of England.

Gay turned professional with Bolton Wanderers in June 1975, having spent two years with Bolton as an apprentice. He joined Exeter City on loan in March 1977. On his debut for Exeter, away to Crewe Alexandra, Gay took over in goal after City keeper Richard Key broke his ankle. This was the first time in Exeter City's history that a debutant outfield player had taken over in goal.

Released by Bolton, he moved to Southport in August 1977, playing 40 times in Southport's final season in the Football League as they failed to gain re-election at the end of the season. In July 1978, Gay joined Wigan Athletic who had taken Southport's place as a League club. He played just once, in Wigan's first ever home game in the Football league, against Grimsby Town.

He left Wigan later that year, joining Macclesfield Town. This was followed by short spells with Bangor City and Crewe Alexandra before returning to Macclesfield Town in 1979. In December 1982, while playing for Macclesfield against Witton Albion, Gay broke his leg in three places and required the insertion of a metal plate. He later joined Mossley, Droylsden and Chorley before a second spell with Macclesfield, rejoining Mossley from there in the 1986 close season. He left Mossley in October 1986, joining Horwich RMI.

Away from football, Gay became a civil servant working for the Employment Department.
