= Ian Gillibrand =

English footballer

Personal information
- Full name: Ian Victor Gillibrand
- Date of birth: 24 November 1948
- Place of birth: Blackburn, England
- Date of death: 2 September 1989 (aged 40)
- Position: Defender

Youth career
- Arsenal

Senior career*
Years	Team	Apps	(Gls)
1968–1979	Wigan Athletic	422	(4)
- * Club domestic league appearances and goals

Ian Victor Gillibrand (24 November 1948 – 2 September 1989) was an English football defender who spent his entire senior career with Wigan Athletic. He played 661 first team games for Wigan, making him the club's appearance record holder, and is the only player in the club's history to play for Wigan in the Cheshire League, Northern Premier League and The Football League.

== Career ==
Born in Blackburn, Gillibrand started his career at Arsenal after spending time on trial with hometown club Blackburn Rovers, but was released without making a first team appearance. He signed for Wigan Athletic in 1968, making his debut against Rhyl. During the next ten years, he was a regular in the side, making over 400 appearances in the Northern Premier League. He also won the club's Player of the Year award on two occasions.

In August 1978, he captained the side in Wigan's inaugural Football League match against Hereford United. Wigan manager Ian McNeill felt that the club's promotion to the Football League had "happened too late" for Gillibrand, who made only seven appearances in the club's first Football League season before taking up a coaching role at the club.

Gillibrand left the club in 1984 to become manager of the Robin Park sports complex. He collapsed and died in Rossendale, whilst playing in a charity cricket match for Lower Darwen, being a village where he had lived throughout his childhood.
