= Alan Crompton =

English footballer

Personal information
- Date of birth: 6 March 1958 (age 68)
- Place of birth: Bolton, England
- Position: Midfielder

Senior career*
Years	Team	Apps	(Gls)
1975–1976	Sunderland	0	(0)
1976–1978	Blackburn Rovers	4	(0)
1978–1979	Wigan Athletic	14	(0)
- Runcorn
- * Club domestic league appearances and goals

Alan Crompton (born 6 March 1958) is an English former footballer who played as a midfielder for Sunderland, Blackburn Rovers, Wigan Athletic and Runcorn.

He was the first ever player to come onto the field as a substitute for Wigan Athletic as a Football League team.
