= Kevin Smart =

English footballer

Personal information
- Full name: Kevin Graham Smart
- Date of birth: 17 October 1958 (age 68)
- Place of birth: Newcastle upon Tyne, England
- Position: Defender

Youth career
- –1976: Plymouth Argyle

Senior career*
Years	Team	Apps	(Gls)
1976–1978	Plymouth Argyle	32	(0)
1978–1980	Wigan Athletic	49	(1)
1980–1988	Folkestone Town		
1988–1990	Hythe Town		
1990–1991	Ashford Town		
1991	Margate		
1991–1992	Hythe Town		
1992	Folkestone Invicta		
1992–1994	Canterbury City		
1994	Hythe United		
1994–1995	Canterbury City		
1995	Hythe United		
1995–1996	Deal Town		
1996–1997	Canterbury City		
1997–2000	Deal Town		
- * Club domestic league appearances and goals

Kevin Graham Smart (born 17 October 1958) is an English retired footballer. He played as a defender in the Football League between 1976 and 1980 for Plymouth Argyle and Wigan Athletic, making a total of 81 appearances scoring one goal. Thereafter he played for non-league clubs in Kent.

== Career ==
Smart, who had come through the youth ranks at Plymouth Argyle played 9 matches, aged 18, for the club in the Second Division in the latter part of the 1976–77 season. Plymouth were relegated that season and Smart was a regular starter during the first part of their 1977–78 campaign in the Third Division. However, in the second half of the season he was unable to command a first choice place with "The Pilgrims" and at its end was made available for a free transfer.

During the summer of 1978 he signed with Football League newcomers Wigan Athletic. During their inaugural 1978–79 season he played in 40 of their 46 league matches in the Fourth Division and scored his only league goal on 17 March 1979, the second in a 2–0 win over Stockport County. He appeared in only nine matches for "The Latics" during the following 1979–80 season and was released at the end of the campaign.

From 1980 Smart played for a succession of non-league Kent clubs, initially mostly playing in the Southern League. During the summer of 1980 Smart signed with Folkestone Town for whom he played for the following eight seasons, during which he became team captain. Folkestone achieved promotion to the Southern League Premier Division following the 1982–83 season and twice won the Kent Senior Cup, in 1983 and 1985. In July 1988 Smart moved to Kent League club Hythe Town who topped the Division One table in 1988–89 and gained promotion to the Southern League for 1989–90, his second season with the club. During the 1990 close season Smart signed with Ashford Town and in November 1990 he suffered the misfortune of breaking a leg; after he recovered, in February 1991 he joined Margate. He left them shortly after the start of the 1991–92 season to return to Hythe Town (for a role primarily as joint reserve team manager), then after a short spell between March and April 1992 with Kent League Division Two club Folkestone Invicta Smart finished the season with Southern League strugglers Canterbury City. He remained with "City", who had joined the Kent League, until January 1994, after which Smart spent two spells at each of three Kent League clubs: Hythe United (from January 1994 and November 1995); Canterbury City (from April 1994 – scoring a hat-trick for then on 20 August 1994 in a 5–2 victory at Darenth Heathside – and August 1996); and Deal Town (from December 1995 and January 1997). Smart remained with the latter club until 2000 and was the joint manager of their reserves team who were the 1998–99 season Kent League Division One champions.

In 2006, he was living in Dover and working as a bricklayer.
