= Neil Davids =

English footballer

Personal information
- Full name: Neil Graham Davids
- Date of birth: 22 September 1955
- Place of birth: Bingley, England
- Date of death: 23 December 2011 (aged 56)
- Place of death: Poulton-le-Fylde, England
- Position: Defender

Youth career
- Leeds United

Senior career*
Years	Team	Apps	(Gls)
1973–1975	Leeds United	0	(0)
1975–1976	Norwich City	2	(0)
1975	→ Northampton Town (loan)	9	(0)
1976	→ Stockport County (loan)	5	(1)
1977–1978	Swansea City	9	(0)
1978–1982	Wigan Athletic	68	(1)

International career
1974	England Youth	2	(1)
- * Club domestic league appearances and goals

Neil Davids (22 September 1955 – 23 December 2011) was an English professional footballer who played as a defender.

Born in Bingley, Bradford, Davids started his career Leeds United, and represented England at youth level. He signed professional terms with the club in August 1973, but left the club two years later without making a single first-team appearance. After a brief spell at Norwich City, Davids joined Swansea City in July 1977, where he featured in the club's promotion-winning campaign from the Fourth Division. He moved to Wigan Athletic in 1978, and played in the club's first ever Football League fixture against Hereford United. He also became the club's first Football League player to be substituted.
