= Ian Purdie =

Scottish footballer

Personal information
- Full name: Ian Purdie
- Date of birth: 7 March 1953 (age 73)
- Place of birth: Bellshill, Scotland
- Height: 1.75 m (5 ft 9 in)
- Position: Winger

Youth career
- Larkhall Thistle

Senior career*
Years	Team	Apps	(Gls)
1971–1975	Aberdeen	39	(10)
1975–1977	Dundee	59	(7)
1977–1978	Motherwell	16	(3)
1978–1979	Wigan Athletic	55	(12)
1979–1980	Portsmouth	5	(1)
1981–1982	Canberra City	43	(13)
1983	Footscray JUST	14	(1)

International career
1974	Scotland U23	1	(0)
- * Club domestic league appearances and goals

Ian Purdie (born 7 March 1953 in Bellshill) is a Scottish former footballer who played as a winger.

He started his professional career at Aberdeen before moving on to Dundee and then Motherwell.

Following a disagreement with his manager at Motherwell, Purdie moved to Wigan Athletic, and was the club's first signing after being elected into the Football League. He made his debut in the club's first ever Football League game against Hereford United, and in October 1978, he became the scorer of Wigan's first successful penalty in the Football League against Northampton Town.

Purdie signed for Portsmouth in October 1979 for a fee of £20,000, but made just five appearances for the club. However, he did score the crucial 2nd goal when Portsmouth beat Northampton 2–0 on 3 May 1980 to secure promotion to Division 3. He moved to the Australian capital in 1981 to play for Canberra City in the National Soccer League, before transferring to Melbourne-based Footscray JUST in 1983. And if he ever reads this, perhaps he'll return the only autographed copies of 'The League at Last' that he 'borrowed' ...
