= Peter Houghton (footballer) =

English footballer (born 1954)

Personal information
- Full name: Peter Houghton
- Date of birth: 30 November 1954 (age 71)
- Place of birth: Liverpool, England
- Height: 5 ft 11 in (1.80 m)
- Position: Forward

Senior career*
Years	Team	Apps	(Gls)
- Prescot Town
197?–1978	South Liverpool		
1978–1983	Wigan Athletic	202	(71)
1983–1985	Preston North End	56	(16)
1984	→ Wrexham (loan)	5	(2)
1985–1988	Chester City	85	(13)
1988–c.1990	Runcorn		
c.1990–?	Warrington Town		
- * Club domestic league appearances and goals

Peter Houghton (born 30 November 1954) is an English former footballer who played as a forward in the Football League for four clubs from 1978 to 1988.

== Playing career ==
A forward, Houghton made his breakthrough into professional football at 23 when Wigan Athletic were elected to The Football League in 1978. He had joined the Latics a few months earlier from South Liverpool, after an earlier spell with Prescot Town where he won a Mid–Cheshire League championship. He had the honour of scoring Wigan's final goal as a non–league club against Matlock Town and helped them win the Lancashire Junior Cup against Chorley. He finished the 1977–78 season with nine goals in 17 league appearances.

Houghton had a goal disallowed on his Football League debut against Hereford United, but ended the season with 13 league goals to his name. He managed to score double figures in four of his five full seasons with Wigan, including 1981–82 when the club won promotion from Division Four. In October 1983 he joined Preston North End, where he spent two years (including a loan spell with Wrexham) before switching to Chester City ahead of 1985–86.

His first season at Chester saw him score 10 times in 37 league appearances to help the Blues to promotion. He remained a regular the following season but was injured for much of 1987–88. This was to be his final season with the club, with his last appearance coming in a 0–0 draw at Chesterfield on 30 April 1988.

After leaving Chester, Houghton dropped into non–league football with Runcorn in the GM Vauxhall Conference and also later played for Warrington Town.

== Honours ==
Prescot Town

- Mid–Cheshire League champions: 1976–77

Wigan Athletic

- Lancashire Junior Cup winners: 1977–78
- Football League Division Four promotion: 1981–82

Chester City

- Football League Division Four runners–up: 1985–86
