= 1977–78 Northern Premier League =

Northern Premier League
- Season: 1977–78
- Champions: Boston United
- Promoted: Wigan Athletic
- Relegated: Great Harwood
- Matches: 552
- Goals: 1,648 (2.99 per match)
- Biggest home win: Gateshead 8–0 South Liverpool (14 February 1978)
- Biggest away win: South Liverpool 0–5 Northwich Victoria (10 September 1977); Lancaster City 1–6 Wigan Athletic (22 October 1977)
- Highest scoring: Boston United 7–3 Frickley Athletic (25 February 1978)
- Longest winning run: 10 matches Bangor City (11 March 1978 – 18 April 1978)
- Longest unbeaten run: 26 matches Wigan Athletic (11 October 1977 – 5 April 1978)
- Longest winless run: 12 matches Barrow (27 August 1977 – 22 October 1977); Lancaster City (26 November 1977 – 11 March 1978)
- Longest losing run: 6 matches Workington (12 October 1977 – 19 November 1977); Buxton (1 April 1978 – 24 April 1978)

The 1977–78 Northern Premier League was the tenth season of the Northern Premier League, a regional football league in Northern England, the northern areas of the Midlands and North Wales. The season began on 21 August 1976 and concluded on 7 May 1978.

== Overview ==
The League featured twenty-four teams.

=== Team changes ===
The following club left the League at the end of the previous season:

- Gateshead United was Folded. A new club formed Gateshead replaced.

The following club joined the League at the start of the season:

- Workington relegated from Football League Fourth Division
- Gateshead (new club formed) replaced to the Gateshead United (club folded).

=== League table ===
Pos	Team	Pld	W	D	L	GF	GA	GD	Pts	Qualification or relegation
1	Boston United (C)	46	31	9	6	85	35	+50	71	
2	Wigan Athletic (P)	46	25	15	6	83	45	+38	65	Promoted to Football League Fourth Division
3	Bangor City	46	26	10	10	92	50	+42	62	
4	Scarborough	46	26	10	10	80	39	+41	62	
5	Altrincham	46	22	15	9	84	49	+35	59	
6	Northwich Victoria	46	22	14	10	83	55	+28	58	
7	Stafford Rangers	46	22	13	11	71	41	+30	57	
8	Runcorn	46	19	18	9	70	44	+26	56	
9	Mossley	46	22	11	13	85	73	+12	55	
10	Matlock Town	46	21	12	13	79	60	+19	54	
11	Lancaster City	46	15	14	17	66	82	−16	44	
12	Frickley Athletic	46	15	12	19	77	81	−4	42	
13	Barrow	46	14	12	20	58	61	−3	40	
14	Goole Town	46	15	9	22	60	68	−8	39	
15	Great Harwood	46	13	13	20	66	83	−17	39	Club folded at the end of the season
16	Gainsborough Trinity	46	14	10	22	61	74	−13	38	
17	Gateshead	46	16	5	25	65	74	−9	37	
18	Netherfield	46	11	13	22	50	80	−30	35	
19	Workington	46	13	8	25	48	80	−32	34	
20	Worksop Town	46	12	10	24	45	84	−39	34	
21	Morecambe	46	11	11	24	67	92	−25	33	
22	Macclesfield Town	46	12	9	25	60	92	−32	33	
23	Buxton	46	13	6	27	60	95	−35	32	
24	South Liverpool	46	9	7	30	53	111	−58	25	

Updated to match(es) played on 7 May 1978. Source: The Football Archives
Rules for classification: 1) points; 2) goal difference; 3) number of goals scored. The points system up until the 1982–83 season: 2 points for a win, 1 point for a draw and 0 points for losing.
(C) Champions; (P) Promoted

=== Results ===
Home \ Away	ALT	BAN	BRW	BOS	BUX	FRK	GAI	GAT	GOO	GHA	LNC	MAC	MAT	MOR	MOS	NET	NOR	RUN	SCA	SLI	STA	WIG	WRK	WOK
Altrincham		3–3	2–0	3–0	4–0	3–1	0–0	2–2	4–0	5–0	2–2	2–2	2–1	3–2	1–2	2–2	2–2	2–0	0–0	3–1	1–1	0–0	5–1	4–0
Bangor City	2–2		1–0	0–1	1–0	5–2	4–1	4–2	2–1	5–1	1–0	6–1	2–0	1–1	2–3	4–0	1–0	2–1	1–2	6–0	1–0	0–0	3–1	3–0
Barrow	1–2	0–2		0–1	1–1	4–1	2–1	1–0	1–0	7–0	1–0	3–0	0–1	3–0	2–2	0–0	4–2	0–0	0–2	3–1	0–1	1–1	3–1	0–0
Boston United	1–0	3–0	2–0		2–1	7–3	1–0	3–1	2–1	4–2	1–3	1–0	2–1	5–2	0–1	2–0	0–1	0–0	0–0	0–0	1–1	4–2	6–0	4–0
Buxton	0–2	0–4	0–2	0–2		0–1	0–3	2–1	2–1	5–1	4–3	1–1	2–3	1–0	3–3	3–1	0–2	0–2	0–3	3–1	0–3	2–2	0–1	7–0
Frickley Athletic	1–1	1–1	0–0	0–3	4–3		2–0	1–3	2–2	1–1	7–1	3–2	1–1	2–2	2–0	1–2	0–3	0–0	0–1	4–2	0–2	4–0	1–2	0–0
Gainsborough Trinity	0–2	0–0	1–1	2–1	0–1	2–2		3–2	1–2	3–1	1–0	1–2	0–0	2–0	2–2	2–2	3–1	2–1	0–1	4–2	2–2	1–2	2–0	3–2
Gateshead United	5–1	1–2	3–0	0–1	3–1	0–2	0–1		2–4	2–1	2–1	1–2	2–1	3–2	1–3	1–0	1–2	1–3	2–2	8–0	0–3	0–3	2–3	1–1
Goole Town	0–1	1–0	0–0	1–1	6–0	3–4	0–1	2–0		2–1	0–2	3–2	3–1	1–1	1–0	2–2	2–2	1–1	2–1	1–0	2–0	0–2	3–0	0–2
Great Harwood	0–2	7–2	1–1	0–1	4–0	3–1	3–1	1–1	2–2		0–0	1–3	5–2	1–2	4–3	2–2	2–0	2–2	2–1	0–0	1–1	2–3	3–1	3–0
Lancaster City	2–1	1–1	4–3	2–2	0–1	1–4	1–0	2–1	0–0	1–1		3–1	1–0	1–3	3–3	1–0	3–2	1–2	0–0	2–0	0–0	1–6	1–0	2–0
Macclesfield Town	3–3	0–2	5–0	0–1	3–0	0–3	1–0	2–0	2–1	0–1	4–0		2–2	1–2	1–3	0–1	0–4	3–1	1–1	1–3	1–0	0–4	1–1	2–1
Matlock Town	3–4	1–1	3–2	2–1	2–1	2–1	1–1	4–1	1–0	3–0	3–0	2–0		0–0	5–2	2–2	2–2	0–2	0–0	4–0	2–1	0–1	3–1	2–1
Morecambe	0–1	0–1	3–1	0–4	1–1	3–2	1–1	1–0	5–1	2–1	4–2	2–2	0–1		1–5	4–1	1–2	1–1	3–5	0–3	1–2	1–2	3–3	2–2
Mossley	1–1	1–0	1–1	1–2	3–2	2–2	2–1	0–1	3–2	1–1	4–1	2–1	2–1	5–4		3–0	2–2	1–3	1–0	2–1	0–1	1–3	5–0	2–1
Netherfield	2–1	3–2	1–2	0–1	1–2	2–4	2–0	1–0	0–1	2–1	2–5	4–1	0–1	1–2	3–2		0–0	0–3	0–3	2–2	0–0	1–2	1–1	1–0
Northwich Victoria	1–0	1–1	1–0	0–2	2–2	2–0	5–4	4–0	2–1	0–0	5–2	3–0	2–5	3–0	1–0	1–1		0–0	2–1	2–0	1–1	1–1	4–2	5–2
Runcorn	1–1	2–2	1–0	2–2	2–1	1–1	3–2	0–3	4–0	0–2	0–0	6–0	1–1	2–1	0–0	2–0	3–0		1–0	4–0	1–1	2–2	1–0	2–0
Scarborough	0–1	0–2	2–1	1–1	2–1	0–1	2–1	0–0	2–1	2–1	0–0	3–0	2–0	1–0	6–0	5–3	1–0	2–1		6–2	2–0	3–1	1–2	4–0
South Liverpool	0–1	0–4	2–4	1–2	4–3	3–2	2–3	0–1	0–2	3–0	2–2	3–2	3–3	2–1	1–2	0–1	0–5	2–2	0–4		1–2	0–2	0–1	1–0
Stafford Rangers	0–1	4–1	1–0	1–1	4–1	3–1	5–0	0–1	1–0	2–0	3–2	2–2	1–3	3–0	0–0	2–0	0–0	2–1	2–0	2–3		2–2	1–0	3–0
Wigan Athletic	1–0	2–1	4–1	0–2	4–0	1–0	2–1	1–0	2–0	0–0	2–2	1–1	2–0	1–1	1–2	0–0	1–1	0–0	2–4	2–0	1–0		4–1	3–0
Workington	2–1	0–1	2–0	0–1	0–2	0–1	4–1	0–1	2–1	2–0	0–0	2–1	0–3	4–1	1–2	4–0	1–2	1–2	0–0	0–0	0–3	1–4		0–0
Worksop Town	1–0	0–2	2–2	0–1	0–1	2–1	2–1	1–3	2–1	0–1	3–5	3–1	1–1	2–1	1–0	1–1	1–0	2–1	1–2	3–2	4–2	1–1	0–0	

Updated to match(es) played on 7 May 1978. Source: The Football Archives
Legend: Blue = home team win; Yellow = draw; Red = away team win.

=== Stadia and locations ===
Locations of the 1977–78 Northern Premier League teams

Team	Stadium
Altrincham	Moss Lane
Bangor City	Farrar Road
Barrow	Holker Street
Boston United	York Street
Buxton	The Silverlands
Frickley Athletic	Westfield Lane
Gainsborough Trinity	The Northolme
Gateshead United	Gateshead Youth Stadium
Goole Town	Victoria Pleasure Ground
Great Harwood	The Showground
Lancaster City	Giant Axe
Macclesfield Town	Moss Rose
Matlock Town	Causeway Lane
Morecambe	Christie Park
Mossley	Seel Park
Netherfield	Parkside
Northwich Victoria	Drill Field
Runcorn	Canal Street
Scarborough	Athletic Ground
South Liverpool	Holly Park
Stafford Rangers	Marston Road
Wigan Athletic	Springfield Park
Workington	Borough Park
Worksop Town	Central Avenue

== Cup results ==
=== Challenge Cup ===
Home team	Score	Away team
Matlock Town	3–0	Boston United

=== Northern Premier League Shield ===
Between Champions of NPL Premier Division and Winners of the NPL Cup.

Home team	Score	Away team
Matlock Town	beat	Boston United

=== FA Cup ===
Out of the twenty-four clubs from the Northern Premier League, only two teams reached the second round:

Second Round

Home team	Score	Away team	
Crewe Alexandra	0–0	Scarborough	
Scarborough	2–0	Crewe Alexandra	Replay
Hartlepool United	4–2	Runcorn	

Third Round

Home team	Score	Away team
Brighton & Hove Albion	3–0	Scarborough

=== FA Trophy ===
Out of the twenty-four clubs from the Northern Premier League, two teams reached the fourth round:

Fourth Round

Home team	Score	Away team
Altrincham	4–2	Winsford United
Merthyr Tydfil	0–0	Runcorn
Runcorn	3–2	Merthyr Tydfil

Semi-finals

Stage	Home team	Score	Away team
1st Leg	Altrincham	0–0	Runcorn
2nd Leg	Runcorn	0–1	Altrincham
Aggregate	Altrincham	1–0	Runcorn

Final

Home team	Score	Away team
Altrincham	3–1	Leatherhead

== End of the season ==
At the end of the tenth season of the Northern Premier League, Wigan Athletic who was put forward for election, received enough votes, on the second round of voting, to be promoted to the Football League. Great Harwood folded Great Harwood Town replaced in Lancashire Combination

=== Football League elections ===
Alongside the four Football League teams facing re-election, two non-League teams, one from the Northern Premier League and the other from the Southern League, applied to be elected. Three out of the four Football League teams were re-elected. Wigan Athletic from the Northern Premier League tied with Southport from the Football League on the first round of voting. A second round was then implemented with Wigan Athletic gaining promotion, replacing Southport from the Football League as they did not receive enough votes. Southport was subsequently relegated to the Northern Premier League.

Club	League	First round votes	Second round votes
York City	Football League Division Four	49	
Rochdale	Football League Division Four	39	
Hartlepool United	Football League Division Four	37	
Wigan Athletic	Northern Premier League	26	29
Southport	Football League Division Four	26	20
Bath City	Southern League	23	

=== Promotion and relegation ===
The number of clubs reduced from twenty-four clubs to twenty-three clubs for the following season.

The following two clubs left the League at the end of the season:

- Wigan Athletic promoted to Football League Fourth Division
- Great Harwood folded

The following club joined the League the following season:

- Southport demoted from Football League Fourth Division
