= 1976–77 Northern Premier League =

Northern Premier League
- Season: 1976–77
- Champions: Boston United
- Promoted: None
- Relegated: None
- Matches: 506
- Goals: 1,494 (2.95 per match)
- Biggest home win: Gainsborough Trinity 7–0 Great Harwood (5 February 1977)
- Biggest away win: South Liverpool 0-8 Bangor City (2 January 1977)
- Highest scoring: Scarborough 5-3 Wigan Athletic (6 November 1976) Bangor City 4-4 Matlock Town (27 November 1976); South Liverpool 0-8 Bangor City (2 January 1977); Worksop Town 1-7 Altrincham (12 March 1977); Frickley Athletic 2-6 Matlock Town (9 April 1977); Great Harwood 4-4 Scarborough (5 May 1977) Gainsborough Trinity 5–3 Stafford Rangers (29 March 1977)
- Longest winning run: 8 matches Lancaster City (11 September 1976 - 11 October 1976)
- Longest unbeaten run: 19 matches Northwich Victoria (6 February 1977 – 18 May 1977)
- Longest winless run: 11 matches Buxton (23 October 1976 – 5 February 1977)
- Longest losing run: 8 matches Barrow (11 April 1977 – 30 April 1977)

The 1976–77 Northern Premier League was the ninth season of the Northern Premier League, a regional football league in Northern England, the northern areas of the Midlands and North Wales. The season began on 21 August 1976 and concluded on 20 May 1977.

== Overview ==
The League featured twenty-three teams for the first time. The systems of goal average was replaced by goal difference.

=== Team changes ===
The following club left the League at the end of the previous season:

- Skelmersdale United resigned, demoted to Lancashire Combination
- Fleetwood folded

The following club joined the League at the start of the season:

- Frickley Athletic promoted from Midland League (1889)

=== League table ===
Pos	Team	Pld	W	D	L	GF	GA	GD	Pts	Relegation
1	Boston United (C)	44	27	11	6	82	35	+47	65	
2	Northwich Victoria	44	27	11	6	85	43	+42	65	
3	Matlock Town	44	26	11	7	108	57	+51	63	
4	Bangor City	44	22	11	11	87	52	+35	55	
5	Scarborough	44	21	12	11	77	66	+11	54	
6	Goole Town	44	23	6	15	64	50	+14	52	
7	Lancaster City	44	21	9	14	71	58	+13	51	
8	Gateshead United	44	18	12	14	80	64	+16	48	Club folded. A new club formed Gateshead replaced
9	Mossley	44	17	14	13	74	59	+15	48	
10	Altrincham	44	19	9	16	60	53	+7	47	
11	Stafford Rangers	44	16	14	14	60	55	+5	46	
12	Runcorn	44	15	14	15	58	50	+8	44	
13	Worksop Town	44	16	12	16	50	58	−8	44	
14	Wigan Athletic	44	14	15	15	62	54	+8	43	
15	Morecambe	44	13	11	20	59	75	−16	37	
16	Gainsborough Trinity	44	13	10	21	58	74	−16	36	
17	Great Harwood	44	11	14	19	63	84	−21	36	
18	Buxton	44	11	13	20	48	63	−15	35	
19	Macclesfield Town	44	8	15	21	41	68	−27	31	
20	Frickley Athletic	44	11	8	25	53	93	−40	30	
21	Barrow	44	11	6	27	56	87	−31	28	
22	South Liverpool	44	10	8	26	51	104	−53	28	
23	Netherfield	44	9	8	27	47	92	−45	26	

Updated to match(es) played on 20 May 1977. Source: The Football Archives
Rules for classification: 1) points; 2) goal difference; 3) number of goals scored. The points system up until the 1982–83 season: 2 points for a win, 1 point for a draw and 0 points for losing.
(C) Champions

=== Results ===
Home \ Away	ALT	BAN	BRW	BOS	BUX	FRK	GAI	GAT	GOO	GHA	LNC	MAC	MAT	MOR	MOS	NET	NOR	RUN	SCA	SLI	STA	WIG	WOK
Altrincham		1–0	3–2	0–0	2–0	2–2	4–1	1–0	4–1	4–1	1–0	1–2	1–0	3–1	1–0	4–1	0–3	0–2	0–1	0–0	0–3	1–3	0–0
Bangor City	1–1		6–0	1–1	1–1	1–0	1–2	0–2	3–1	3–1	0–0	1–0	4–4	1–0	3–0	3–1	1–2	0–0	1–0	4–1	2–0	0–0	2–0
Barrow	0–1	0–3		0–1	0–2	2–0	2–2	1–2	1–2	1–0	0–2	4–3	0–3	3–1	2–3	2–2	3–1	0–1	1–2	1–2	1–1	4–1	0–1
Boston United	4–0	1–3	2–0		2–0	3–0	2–0	1–1	1–0	3–0	3–2	1–0	1–5	6–0	2–1	4–0	2–1	2–0	1–1	4–0	1–1	1–1	4–2
Buxton	0–0	4–2	0–1	1–5		0–1	2–2	2–0	2–0	3–1	0–1	1–0	1–5	3–0	1–1	0–0	0–1	0–0	2–2	1–1	1–1	0–3	1–2
Frickley Athletic	1–1	1–2	4–0	0–3	1–2		3–2	2–0	1–5	3–1	0–1	1–1	2–6	0–2	0–0	2–0	1–1	0–2	4–1	3–0	0–0	2–0	0–0
Gainsborough Trinity	0–1	2–1	4–0	0–2	2–1	3–2		0–0	0–1	7–0	0–3	2–0	0–4	1–2	0–1	2–1	2–2	0–0	2–0	3–2	5–3	0–0	1–0
Gateshead United	1–2	5–1	3–2	3–1	0–1	3–2	4–1		2–1	5–1	3–1	1–1	1–3	3–3	1–1	3–2	3–0	1–0	0–1	5–0	2–0	2–0	0–3
Goole Town	2–1	2–3	1–0	0–2	3–1	3–0	2–0	3–2		0–1	2–0	1–0	0–1	0–0	2–0	2–0	2–1	2–1	3–2	4–2	0–0	0–1	1–1
Great Harwood	1–3	2–2	0–2	3–0	3–2	5–2	2–2	2–2	0–2		1–0	0–1	2–2	3–2	0–3	0–1	1–1	2–2	4–4	4–1	2–2	2–0	5–0
Lancaster City	1–0	2–1	1–3	1–2	2–1	1–3	2–0	3–3	2–0	1–1		3–1	4–3	3–2	2–0	3–0	1–1	3–1	1–2	5–2	1–2	1–1	1–1
Macclesfield Town	0–2	1–1	3–1	0–0	1–2	1–1	1–1	0–1	1–2	1–3	0–0		0–3	1–1	1–3	0–3	2–2	1–1	0–1	3–1	2–2	2–2	2–0
Matlock Town	5–2	1–1	1–1	1–1	1–2	4–2	2–2	5–1	1–1	4–2	2–0	3–0		2–1	2–2	3–2	1–4	2–1	1–1	4–0	4–0	2–1	4–3
Morecambe	3–0	1–3	0–5	0–1	1–1	5–0	1–2	1–1	1–0	0–1	4–1	0–0	0–1		3–2	2–0	0–3	1–1	1–2	3–2	1–2	1–0	5–1
Mossley	2–1	3–2	1–0	2–1	1–1	4–0	5–0	2–2	2–5	2–1	3–0	1–2	1–2	1–1		4–1	1–1	3–2	0–1	2–0	1–1	1–3	1–1
Netherfield	1–0	1–3	3–1	0–3	3–2	1–3	2–1	1–1	0–1	0–0	1–3	1–3	3–1	1–2	1–1		1–3	2–2	0–3	2–3	1–0	1–0	0–1
Northwich Victoria	1–1	2–0	5–1	1–3	1–1	5–0	1–0	2–1	3–0	2–1	1–0	2–0	3–2	2–2	3–1	4–1		1–3	4–0	3–1	2–0	1–0	1–0
Runcorn	2–1	0–0	1–2	0–1	1–1	4–0	2–1	2–1	2–1	2–0	1–3	4–0	0–2	4–1	0–4	2–2	1–2		1–1	2–0	2–0	1–1	0–1
Scarborough	1–0	2–3	3–3	2–1	1–0	4–2	3–2	3–3	2–2	1–1	2–2	1–2	3–1	4–1	2–0	2–0	1–1	1–1		0–1	1–0	5–3	3–1
South Liverpool	1–0	0–8	1–1	0–0	2–1	3–1	1–1	0–3	1–2	1–1	2–3	1–1	1–3	3–0	2–5	2–2	1–2	0–4	5–1		2–1	0–3	0–2
Stafford Rangers	1–1	0–5	2–1	0–1	2–0	3–0	1–0	2–2	1–0	3–0	0–2	2–0	0–0	0–1	0–0	6–1	1–1	3–0	3–1	3–2		3–1	1–1
Wigan Athletic	1–2	2–1	5–2	1–1	3–1	4–1	3–0	2–0	1–1	1–1	2–2	0–0	0–2	1–1	2–2	2–0	0–1	0–0	1–3	3–0	1–2		2–0
Worksop Town	1–7	2–3	2–0	1–1	1–0	2–0	2–0	2–1	0–1	1–1	0–1	4–1	0–0	1–1	1–1	3–1	0–1	1–0	1–0	0–1	3–2	1–1	

Updated to match(es) played on 20 May 1977. Source: The Football Archives
Legend: Blue = home team win; Yellow = draw; Red = away team win.

=== Stadia and locations ===
Locations of the 1976–77 Northern Premier League teams

Team	Stadium
Altrincham	Moss Lane
Bangor City	Farrar Road
Barrow	Holker Street
Boston United	York Street
Buxton	The Silverlands
Frickley Athletic	Westfield Lane
Gainsborough Trinity	The Northolme
Gateshead United	Gateshead Youth Stadium
Goole Town	Victoria Pleasure Ground
Great Harwood	The Showground
Lancaster City	Great Axe
Macclesfield Town	Moss Rose
Matlock Town	Causeway Lane
Morecambe	Christie Park
Mossley	Seel Park
Netherfield	Parkside
Northwich Victoria	Drill Field
Runcorn	Canal Street
Scarborough	Athletic Ground
South Liverpool	Holly Park
Stafford Rangers	Marston Road
Wigan Athletic	Springfield Park
Worksop Town	Central Avenue

== Cup results ==
=== Challenge Cup ===
Home team	Score	Away team
Scarborough	1–0	Runcorn

=== Northern Premier League Shield ===
Between Champions of NPL Premier Division and Winners of the NPL Cup.

Home team	Score	Away team
Boston United	beat	Scarborough

=== FA Cup ===
Out of the twenty-four clubs from the Northern Premier League, only three teams reached the second round:

Second Round

Home team	Score	Away team	
Mansfield Town	2–5	Matlock Town	
Northwich Victoria	4–0	Peterborough United	
Wrexham	1–1	Goole Town	
Goole Town	0–1	Wrexham	Replay

Third Round

Home team	Score	Away team
Carlisle United	5–1	Matlock Town
Northwich Victoria	3–2	Watford

Fourth Round

Home team	Score	Away team
Carlisle United	5–1	Matlock Town
Northwich Victoria	1–3	Oldham Athletic

=== FA Trophy ===
Out of the twenty-four clubs from the Northern Premier League, three teams reached the fourth round:

Fourth Round

Home team	Score	Away team	
Scarborough	1-1	Nuneaton Borough	
Nuneaton Borough	0-1	Scarborough	Replay
Slough Town	2-0	Morecambe	
Weymouth	0-0	Altrincham	
Altrincham	2-1	Weymouth	Replay

Semi-finals

Stage	Home team	Score	Away team
1st Leg	Scarborough	2-0	Altrincham
2nd Leg	Altrincham	2-0	Scarborough
Aggregate	Scarborough	2-2	Altrincham
Replay	Scarborough	0-0	Altrincham
2nd Replay	Scarborough	2-1	Altrincham

Final

Home team	Score	Away team
Scarborough	3-2	Dagenham

== End of the season ==
At the end of the ninth season of the Northern Premier League, Altrincham who put forward for election did not receive enough votes to be promoted to the Football League.

=== Football League elections ===
Alongside the four Football League teams facing re-election, two non-League teams, one from the Northern Premier League and the other from the Southern League. Applied to be elected. Three out of the four Football League teams were re-elected. Wimbledon from the Southern League replaced Workington from the Football League as they didn't receive enough votes. Workington was subsequently relegated to the Northern Premier League.

Club	League	Votes
Halifax Town	Football League Division Four	44
Hartlepool	Football League Division Four	42
Southport	Football League Division Four	37
Wimbledon	Southern League Premier Division	27
Workington	Football League Division Four	21
Altrincham	Northern Premier League	12

=== Promotion and relegation ===
The following club left the League at the end of the season:

- Gateshead United folded. A new club formed Gateshead replaced.

The following club joined the League the following season:

- Workington relegated from Football League Fourth Division
