= Frank Corrigan =

English footballer

Personal information
- Full name: Francis Joseph Corrigan
- Date of birth: 13 November 1952
- Place of birth: Liverpool, England
- Date of death: 29 November 2023 (aged 71)
- Position: Midfielder

Youth career
- Ormskirk

Senior career*
Years	Team	Apps	(Gls)
1972–1973	Blackpool	0	(0)
1973	Walsall	1	(0)
1973–1975	Burton Albion		
1975	Bangor City		
1975–1978	Northwich Victoria		
1978–1981	Wigan Athletic	129	(12)
- Northwich Victoria
- * Club domestic league appearances and goals

Francis Joseph Corrigan (13 November 1952 – 29 November 2023) was an English professional footballer who played as a midfielder. He spent the majority of his career at Wigan Athletic, for whom he was a regular starter in the club's inaugural season in the Football League.

== Playing career ==
Corrigan joined Burton Albion in 1973. He helped the team win promotion to the Southern League Premier Division in 1973–74, and was part of the team which reached the 1974–75 FA Trophy semi-final.

In the 1976–77 FA Cup, he scored the winning goal for Northwich Victoria in their third round tie against Watford.

He joined Wigan Athletic in March 1978, three months before they were elected into The Football League. He played in Wigan's first ever League game at Hereford United, and went on to make over 100 League appearances for the club.
