= Jeff Wright (footballer) =

English footballer

Personal information
- Full name: Jeffrey Kenneth Wright
- Date of birth: 23 June 1952 (age 74)
- Place of birth: Alston, England
- Position: Midfielder

Senior career*
Years	Team	Apps	(Gls)
- Tow Law
19??–1974	Netherfield		
1974–1982	Wigan Athletic	319	(47)
- Barrow
- Prudhoe East End
- Gretna
- Consett
- Penrith
- * Club domestic league appearances and goals

Jeffrey Kenneth Wright (born 23 June 1952) is an English former football midfielder who spent the majority of his career at Wigan Athletic.

== Biography ==
Born in Alston, Wright played for a number of local football clubs before joining Kendal-based club Netherfield in the Northern Premier League. In February 1974, Wright was signed by Wigan Athletic for a reported transfer fee between £1,200 and £2,000.

Wright helped Wigan win the 1974–75 Northern Premier League, and was part of the team that were elected into the Football League in 1978. He played in the club's first ever League game against Hereford United on 19 August 1978, and was an ever-present in the club's 46 league games during their inaugural season. He went on to make 139 League appearances for the club, scoring 19 goals.

Wright returned to non-league football in 1982, and went on to play for Barrow, Prudhoe East End, Gretna, Consett and Penrith. He was appointed as Penrith's manager in 1989, but resigned a year later.

After retiring from professional football, Wright moved to Bellingham, Northumberland, where he worked for an insurance company before later setting up his own business.
