= Micky Worswick =

English footballer

Personal information
- Full name: Michael Anthony Worswick
- Date of birth: 14 March 1945 (age 81)
- Place of birth: Preston, England
- Position: Winger

Youth career
- Blackburn Rovers
- Preston North End

Senior career*
Years	Team	Apps	(Gls)
- Burscough
- Skelmersdale United
- Chorley
1972–1979	Wigan Athletic	249	(73)
- Barrow

International career
1968	England Amateurs	1	(0)
- * Club domestic league appearances and goals

Michael Anthony Worswick (born 14 March 1945) is an English former footballer who played for Burscough, Skelmersdale United, Chorley, Wigan Athletic and Barrow.

== Career ==
Born in Preston, Lancashire, Worswick started his career as an amateur at Blackburn Rovers and Preston North End, but did not make any first team appearances. He went on to play for Burscough and Skelmersdale United in the Lancashire Combination, and played for Skelmersdale in the final of the 1966–67 FA Amateur Cup final.

He later played for Chorley and Wigan Athletic in the Northern Premier League, and was part of the Wigan team which was elected into the Football League in 1978. During the following season, he made his only Football League appearance as a substitute against Newport County.
