= John Brown (footballer, born 1947) =

English footballer (1947–2024)

Personal information
- Full name: John Christopher Brown
- Date of birth: 30 December 1947
- Place of birth: Bradford, Yorkshire, England
- Date of death: 16 May 2024 (aged 76)
- Position: Goalkeeper

Youth career
- 1964–1966: Preston North End

Senior career*
Years	Team	Apps	(Gls)
1966–1975	Preston North End	67	(0)
1970–1971	→ Stockport County (loan)	26	(0)
1975–1976	Stockport County	15	(0)
1976–1982	Wigan Athletic	162	(0)
1982–1983	Macclesfield Town	15	(0)
Total		285	(0)
- * Club domestic league appearances and goals

John Brown (30 December 1947 – 16 May 2024) was an English footballer who played as a goalkeeper for Preston North End, Stockport County, Wigan Athletic and Macclesfield Town.

== Playing career ==
Born in Bradford, Yorkshire, Brown joined Preston North End as an apprentice in 1964. He made his first team debut in 1966, and spent his first few years at the club as an understudy to first-choice goalkeeper Alan Kelly. He had a loan spell with Stockport County during the 1970–71 season, making 26 appearances for the club.

Following a career-ending injury to Kelly in 1973, Brown became first choice goalkeeper at Preston until the club signed Roy Tunks a year later.

Brown re-joined Stockport on a permanent deal in 1975, but spent only one season with the club.

In 1976, he signed for Wigan Athletic when they were still in the Northern Premier League and made 69 league appearances for the club before they were voted into the Football League. Brown was Wigan's first ever goalkeeper in the Football League and was the club's Player of the Year in 1980. He made a further 93 league appearances for the club before joining Macclesfield Town in 1982.

Brown died on 16 May 2024, at the age of 76.
