= Gateshead United F.C. =

Gateshead United
- Full name: Gateshead United Football Club
- Nickname: The Babes (in South Shields)
- Founded: 1936
- Dissolved: 1977
- Ground: Horsley Hill (1936–1950); Simonside Hall (1950–1974); Gateshead Youth Stadium (1974–1977)
- 1976–77: Northern Premier League, 8th

Gateshead United Football Club was a football club based in Gateshead, Tyne and Wear, England. The club was established in South Shields in 1936 as a replacement for the club that had relocated to Gateshead in 1930. Like their predecessor, the club was relocated to Gateshead in 1974 after the former club went bust. Renamed Gateshead United, they folded three years later.

== History ==
=== South Shields ===
Following the departure of the original South Shields to Gateshead in 1930, the new club was formed in 1936 following a public meeting at the Ocean Road Congregational Church Hall organised by the Shields Gazette. The club was admitted to the North Eastern League for the 1936–37 season. They finished third in their first season, before winning the league in 1938–39. After World War II they reached the first round of the FA Cup for the first time in 1947–48, losing 4–1 at Crewe Alexandra. In the preliminary qualifying round match against Radcliffe Welfare United, Chris Marron scored 10 goals in a 13–0 win, an FA Cup record. The following season saw them finish as runners-up, a feat they repeated in 1955–56 and 1956–57. The latter season also saw another FA Cup first round appearance, resulting in 4–0 defeat at Chesterfield in a replay. In the following season the club reached the second round of the FA Cup, beating Frickley Colliery in the first round, before losing 3–1 to York City in the second round. They went on to win the league that season, after which the club applied for election to the Fourth Division of the Football League, but received only one vote.

The North Eastern League folded in 1958, after which South Shields became members of the Midland League. In 1958–59 the club reached the second round of the FA Cup again after thrashing Fourth Division Crewe 5–0 in a replay, before losing 2–0 at Oldham in the next round. Another second round appearance followed the next season, with a 2–1 win over Third Division Chesterfield in the first round setting up a second round tie with Bradford Park Avenue, which saw them lose 5–1. Both of their seasons in the Midland League saw the club apply for Football League membership again, but they received only a single vote on each occasion.

In 1960 the Midland League also folded, and the club became members of the new Northern Counties League, effectively a reformed North Eastern League; they were joined by Gateshead, who had been voted out of the Football League. Another attempt at gaining Football League membership in 1961 saw them receive their customary one vote. The 1961–62 season saw them finish as league runners-up and win the League Cup, but in the Football League elections they failed to any votes. The league was renamed the North Eastern League in 1962 and the club finished as runners-up again in 1962–63, receiving a single vote again in the Football League elections. At the end of the 1963–64 season, which had seen the club finish second for a third consecutive season (and two votes in the Football League elections), the league was disbanded.

South Shields subsequently became members of the North Regional League, which was largely composed of reserve teams of Football League clubs. Further attempts to gain election to the Football League saw them gain one vote in 1965 and three in 1966, which marked their final attempt. They were North Regional League champions in 1966–67, and in 1968 the club became a founder member of the Northern Premier League. Although they had made regular appearances in the first round of the FA Cup throughout the 1960s, the 1969–70 season saw the club achieve their best-ever run. After beating Fourth Division clubs Bradford Park Avenue and Oldham in the first and second round, they were drawn away to Second Division QPR in the third round, losing 4–1. In 1972 they applied for membership of the Scottish Second Division (along with Wigan Athletic) but were rejected. The 1973–74 season saw the club reach the semi-finals of the FA Trophy, eventually losing 3–0 on aggregate to Morecambe, despite having beaten them 6–0 and 7–1 in the league earlier in the season.

At the end of the 1973–74 season South Shields were made homeless after selling their Simonside Hall ground and being prevented from moving back to Horsley Hill. Repeating what had happened in 1930, the club relocated to Gateshead and were renamed Gateshead United. Another attempt was made to join the Scottish league, but they were rejected again, losing out to Ferranti Thistle.

=== Gateshead United ===
In its first season under the new name, the club finished seventh in the Northern Premier League and reached the second round of the FA Cup, defeating Crewe in the first round, before losing 3–0 at Altrincham. Another second round appearance the following season ended with a 3–1 defeat at Rochdale after the club had won 3–1 at Grimsby Town in the first round. However, at the end of the 1976–77 season the club disbanded and was replaced by another new Gateshead club.

== Ground ==
The club originally played at Horsley Hill, the former ground of the original South Shields. However, a dispute with the stadium owners led to them leaving in 1950 to move to a new ground at Simonside Hall. With support from the 13,000-strong supporters' club, two new stands were built and floodlights installed. The supporters' club bought the ground in the 1950s to ensure it could be used by the club in perpetuity. The ground's record attendance was 20,500, and there were plans to create a 35,000-capacity stadium.

The supporters' club was later disbanded and ownership of the ground passed to the football club's directors. In the 1970s the ground was sold with the intent to move back to Horsley Hill. However, a deal had not been finalised to buy Horsley Hill before Simonside Hall was sold, leaving the club homeless. When the club relocated to Gateshead, they played at the Gateshead Youth Stadium.

== Colours ==
Upon the reformation in 1936, South Shields played in red-and-green-quartered shirts, colours going back to the town's early football league days in the 1920s. In the 1960s, however, the club reverted to all-white with blue trim. By the end of the decade Shields were seen playing in amber shirts and blue shorts; these colours were worn at their FA Cup third round match at QPR in 1970. At some point in the 1970s Shields reverted to an all-red kit until their departure from Simonside Hall.

For their existence as Gateshead United, they adopted home colours of white and green.

== Honours ==
- North Eastern League
  - Champions 1938–39, 1957–58
  - League Cup winners 1961–62
- North Regional League
  - Champions 1966–67
- Durham Challenge Cup
  - Winners 1936–37, 1937–38, 1948–49

== Records ==
- Best FA Cup performance: Third round, 1969–70
- Best FA Trophy performance: Semi-finals, 1973–74

== See also ==
- Gateshead United F.C. players
- Gateshead United F.C. managers
