= Marston Road (Stafford) =

Sports venue in England

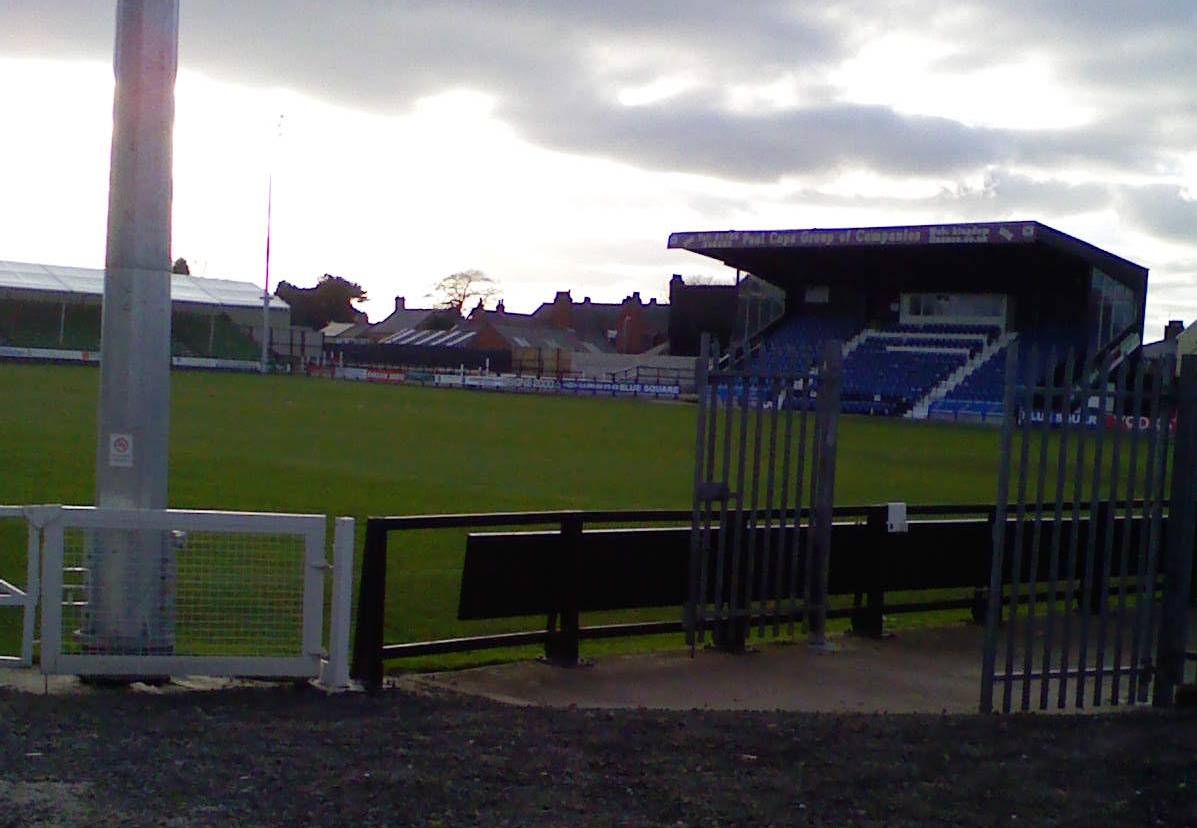
- Interactive map of Marston Road
- Full name: Marston Road
- Location: Marston Road; Stafford; ST16 3BX
- Coordinates: 52°49′07″N 2°07′01″W
- Operator: Stafford Rangers F.C.
- Capacity: 4,150
- Surface: Grass

Construction
- Opened: 1896
- Renovated: 1946
- Expanded: 2007

Tenant
- Stafford Rangers F.C.

Marston Road is a football ground in Stafford, England. It is the home ground of Stafford Rangers F.C., a semi-professional team who play in the Northern Premier League Division One West.

== Ground history ==
The first competitive game at the ground took place on Saturday 5 September 1896, a North Staffordshire League fixture against Dresden United Reserves. Players changed in an upstairs club room at the Albion Hotel before crossing the road to what was then referred to as the Albion Ground. During 1920 the ground was purchased when Rangers became a limited company, and soon banking appeared around the pitch and four huts were bought from Cannock Chase War Training Group. The first Supporters' Club built a stand on the Lotus site which is quite possibly the structure in use today, and work also commenced on dressing rooms, offices and turnstiles ready for the 1921 season. Two years later the club hit financial difficulties and the ground was mortgaged for £500, but worse followed, for in 1929 fire destroyed part of it.

During the war Marston Road fell into disrepair but was renovated by Supporters Club members ready for use at the start of the 1946/47 season. It remained more or less unchanged until an upturn in playing fortunes during the late sixties saw the launch of a floodlighting fund. £6,000 was raised and on Monday 5 September 1969 a crowd of 3,045 watched the official opener against Port Vale. The seventies saw the ground develop to its current status with a new seated stand to replace the ramshackle old stand which stood along the Marston Road side. Considerable delays were experienced following planning permission for the 450-seater and the old stand was still in place when Rotherham United's visit in the FA Cup 3rd Round on 4 January 1975 brought in the record gate of 8,536. The stand was used for the last time the following month and volunteer work helped create the new one in time for the start of the following season.

The next significant work at Marston Road was the building of the new dressing room block and office complex which was officially opened in December 1977 following a match with Stoke City. New terrace steps were constructed at the Social Club end of the ground during the 1988 close season. When the new board of directors took over in 1997, work was carried out to tidy up the ground and the Social Club was extended. During the 2005/06 season, the floodlights were replaced and the seating capacity of the stand was increased to over 500 seats.

== Stands ==
=== Main Stand Side ===
530 seats in a single stand which sits on the halfway line, containing press/directors facilities. The blue seats now in place were bought from Leicester City's doomed Main Stand, due to ground improvements required for National Conference football. Either side of the stand lies shallow terracing.

=== Lotus Side ===
Small terrace stand that runs the length of the pitch with old wooden roof supports that according to some date back to before the First World War.

=== Shed End ===
The traditional gathering point for the more vocal parts of Rangers' support. The Shed End is said to have equal ability to "suck a goal in" as other supporter strongholds such as Manchester United's Stretford End and Wolverhampton Wanderers' Sir Jack Hayward Stand. The Shed End was knocked down, and a new 2,000-seat stand erected by 4 April 2007, when it was tested by the Conference Safety Officers. In May 2009 the 2,000 seated temporary Shed End stand was taken away, with crowds set to average just over 525 in the second season back in the Conference North, it was no longer necessary. The stand heavily cost the club, and they were forced to establish a '250 Club' to keep the club alive, where fans loaned the club £200, and the loan was used to pay off the debt to the seating company, which could have led to administration. For the first half of the 2009–10 season the Shed End was just a terraced end, and in early 2010 crush barriers were tested, and a row were installed to increase the capacity of the Shed End, however, the Shed End still has no roof, which means the electric atmosphere is currently not created. The cost to cover the whole end was suggested to be approximately £180,000.

=== Social Club End ===
Area of the ground in which the Social Club sits. In 1997 the Social Club was extended and a result there is limited capacity on this side of the ground. A new terrace was erected here, in time for the safety tests on 4 April 2007. As with the Shed End, the temporary covered terrace was sent back, and nothing has yet replaced the stand or any plans announced, as the 2009–2010 season has drawn to a close.

== The future ==
Because of the land-locked nature of Marston Road, it is widely accepted that for the club to progress then they must move away from their home of over 100 years. At present there are no official plans to do this and the club are instead upgrading the ground to meet league requirements.
