= David Fretwell =

English footballer

Personal information
- Full name: David Fretwell
- Date of birth: 18 February 1952 (age 74)
- Place of birth: Normanton, England
- Height: 5 ft 9 in (1.75 m)
- Position: Defender

Youth career
- 1967–1971: Bradford City

Senior career*
Years	Team	Apps	(Gls)
1971–1978	Bradford City	253	(5)
1978	California Sunshine	17	(2)
1978	Chicago Sting	0	(0)
1978–1981	Wigan Athletic	112	(0)
1981–1985	Northwich Victoria	136	(0)
1985–1987	Mossley		
1987–1989	Salisbury City		(0)
- * Club domestic league appearances and goals

David Fretwell (born 18 February 1952) is an English retired footballer who played in the Football League for Bradford City and Wigan Athletic. He signed for Bradford City as an amateur in 1967, making 253 league, 18 FA Cup and 9 League Cup appearances for them between 1971 and 1978.

He also played non-league football for Northwich Victoria, Mossley, where he scored once from 63 appearances in all competitions, and Salisbury City (where he was assistant manager). He subsequently played in the United States for the California Sunshine and the Chicago Sting.

== Sources ==
- Frost, Terry (1988). Bradford City A Complete Record 1903–1988. Breedon Books Sport. ISBN 0-907969-38-0.
