= Ian McNeill =

Scottish footballer and manager

Personal information
- Full name: John McKeand McNeill
- Date of birth: 24 February 1932
- Place of birth: Glasgow, Scotland
- Date of death: 6 October 2017 (aged 85)
- Position: Inside forward

Senior career*
Years	Team	Apps	(Gls)
1949–1956	Aberdeen	7	(1)
1956–1959	Leicester City	72	(26)
1959–1962	Brighton & Hove Albion	116	(12)
1962–1964	Southend United	41	(3)
1964–1965	Dover Athletic		
1965–1968	Ross County		

Managerial career
- 1966–1968: Ross County (player/manager)
- 1968–1970: Wigan Athletic
- 1970–1971: Salisbury
- 1971–1976: Ross County
- 1976–1981: Wigan Athletic
- 1981: Northwich Victoria
- 1987–1990: Shrewsbury Town
- * Club domestic league appearances and goals

John McKeand "Ian" McNeill (24 February 1932 – 6 October 2017) was a Scottish professional footballer and manager. Playing at inside forward, McNeill started his career at Aberdeen, making his first team debut in January 1951. McNeill moved to England in 1956, and went on to play for Leicester City, Brighton & Hove Albion and Southend United. He returned to Scotland to join Ross County, then a Highland League club, initially as a player before taking over as manager the following season. He led the club to their first ever Highland League Championship in 1967.

He then became manager of Wigan Athletic, then a Northern Premier League club, in 1968. McNeill then managed Salisbury in the Southern League, before returning for a second spell at Ross County in 1971. In 1976 he rejoined Wigan Athletic, and led the club into the Football League in 1978. In 1981 he became assistant manager to John Neal at Chelsea. When Neal was sidelined with ill-health during the 1984–85 season, McNeill also took temporary charge of first team affairs.

He returned to management in 1987, this time with Shrewsbury Town and remained until 1990. After this he became assistant manager to Bruce Rioch at Millwall, and later worked as a scout for Bolton Wanderers, Leeds United, Norwich City, Wigan Athletic and Chelsea. He retired from the sport in 2006 and returned to Scotland.

== Playing career ==
McNeill was born on 24 February 1932, and grew up in the Baillieston area of Glasgow. He was scouted by Aberdeen whilst playing for Junior side Bridgeton Waverley and the Scotland under-18 youth team, and joined the club as a part-time player in 1949 while continuing his apprenticeship as a draughtsman. He made his first team debut in January 1951 against St Mirren, scoring his first goal for the club within ten minutes in a 1–1 draw. His playing career at Aberdeen was interrupted by National Service, which he spent in Kenya for 18 months before returning to the club in 1955. He struggled to break into the first team, and in 1956 he moved to England to join Leicester City.

He scored 18 goals in his first full season at Leicester, helping the club win promotion to the First Division. In 1957–58, McNeill scored the only goal in a 1–0 win in the final game of the season against Birmingham City, ensuring the club avoided relegation. He made 72 appearances for the club before joining Brighton & Hove Albion in March 1959. He went on to play for Southend United before finishing his playing career in Scotland with Highland League side Ross County.

== Coaching career ==
McNeill was appointed as manager at Ross County while still playing for the club, and managed the team when they won the Highland League for the first time in 1967. He then had a couple of spells with English non-league clubs, first with Northern Premier League side Wigan Athletic, followed by Salisbury in the Southern League. He returned to Ross County before re-joining Wigan Athletic in 1976. In 1978, he took Wigan to the Football League for the first time after the club were elected to replace Southport. The club went on to finish in the top six for the first two seasons in the Fourth Division.

In 1981, he joined Chelsea as assistant manager to former Southend United teammate John Neal.
