= List of Preston North End F.C. seasons =

Chart of Preston North End F.C. Performances

This is a list of seasons played by Preston North End Football Club in English football, from 1883, the year of the club's first FA Cup campaign, to the present day. It details the club's achievements in major competitions, including its invincible season in the first season of the Football League, and the top scorers for each season.

== Seasons ==
Season	League									FA Cup	EFL Cup	Other		Top scorer(s)	
Season	Div	Pld	W	D	L	GF	GA	Pts	Pos	FA Cup	EFL Cup	Other		Player(s)	Goals
1883–84	There was no League football until 1888.									R4					
1884–85	There was no League football until 1888.									N/A					
1885–86	There was no League football until 1888.									R3					
1886–87	There was no League football until 1888.									SF					
1887–88	There was no League football until 1888.									R/U					
1888–89	FL	22	18	4	0	74	15	40	1st	W				John Goodall	22
1889–90	FL	22	15	3	4	71	30	33	1st	QF				Nick Ross	24
1890–91	FL	22	12	3	7	44	23	27	2nd	R1				Hugh Gallacher	6
1891–92	FL	26	18	1	7	61	31	37	2nd	QF				Jimmy Ross	18
1892–93	Div 1	30	17	3	10	57	39	37	2nd	SF				Frank Becton	23
1893–94	Div 1	30	10	3	17	44	56	23	14th	R2				Jimmy Ross	24
1894–95	Div 1	30	15	5	10	62	46	35	4th	R2				David Smith; Adam Henderson	12
1895–96	Div 1	30	11	6	13	44	48	28	9th	R1				Jackie Pierce	8
1896–97	Div 1	30	11	12	7	55	40	34	4th	QF				David Boyd	14
1897–98	Div 1	30	8	8	14	35	43	24	12th	R1				Sandy Brown	11
1898–99	Div 1	34	10	9	15	44	47	29	15th	R2				Tom Pratt	17
1899–1900	Div 1	34	12	4	18	38	48	28	16th	QF				Adam Henderson	13
1900–01	Div 1	34	9	7	18	49	75	25	17th	R1				Andrew Gara	11
1901–02	Div 2	34	18	6	10	71	32	42	3rd	R1				Harry Wilcox	14
1902–03	Div 2	34	13	10	11	56	40	36	7th	R2				Frank Pearson	18
1903–04	Div 2	34	20	10	4	62	24	50	1st	R2				Percy Smith	26
1904–05	Div 1	34	13	10	11	42	37	36	8th	QF				Percy Smith	14
1905–06	Div 1	38	17	13	8	54	39	47	2nd	R1				Dicky Bond	17
1906–07	Div 1	38	14	7	17	44	57	35	14th	R1				Charlie Dawson	11
1907–08	Div 1	38	12	12	14	47	53	36	12th	R1				Percy Smith	12
1908–09	Div 1	38	13	11	14	48	44	37	10th	R2				James Wilson	11
1909–10	Div 1	38	15	5	18	52	58	35	12th	R1				David McLean	19
1910–11	Div 1	38	12	11	15	40	49	35	14th	R2				David McLean; Jimmy Bannister	7
1911–12	Div 1	38	13	7	18	40	57	33	19th	R1				William Kirby	14
1912–13	Div 2	38	19	15	4	56	33	53	1st	R1				Ben Green	13
1913–14	Div 1	38	12	6	20	52	69	30	19th	R3				Fred Osborn	26
1914–15	Div 2	38	20	10	8	61	42	50	2nd	R1				Fred Osborn	17
No competitive football was played between 1915 and 1919 due to the World War I
1919–20	Div 1	42	14	10	18	57	73	38	19th	R3				Tommy Roberts	29
1920–21	Div 1	42	15	9	18	61	65	39	16th	SF				Tommy Roberts	25
1921–22	Div 1	42	13	12	17	42	65	38	16th	R/U				Tommy Roberts	25
1922–23	Div 1	42	13	11	18	60	64	37	16th	R2				Tommy Roberts	29
1923–24	Div 1	42	12	10	20	52	67	34	18th	R1				Tommy Roberts	26
1924–25	Div 1	42	10	6	26	37	74	26	21st	R2				Rowland Woodhouse	9
1925–26	Div 2	42	18	7	17	71	84	43	12th	R3				Alex James	14
1926–27	Div 2	42	20	9	13	74	72	49	6th	R4				Tommy Roberts	30
1927–28	Div 2	42	22	9	11	100	66	53	4th	R3				Norman Robson	19
1928–29	Div 2	42	15	9	18	78	79	39	13th	R3				Alex Hair	19
1929–30	Div 2	42	13	11	18	65	80	37	16th	R3				James McCelland; George Smithies	10
1930–31	Div 2	42	17	11	14	83	64	45	7th	R3				George Bargh; Tom Scott	14
1931–32	Div 2	42	16	10	16	75	77	42	13th	R5				Ted Harper	27
1932–33	Div 2	42	16	10	16	74	70	42	9th	R3				Ted Harper	37
1933–34	Div 2	42	23	6	13	71	52	52	2nd	QF				George Stephenson	16
1934–35	Div 1	42	15	12	15	62	67	42	11th	QF				Bud Maxwell	26
1935–36	Div 1	42	18	8	16	67	64	44	7th	R4				Bud Maxwell	19
1936–37	Div 1	42	14	13	15	56	67	41	14th	R/U				Frank O'Donnell	27
1937–38	Div 1	42	16	17	9	64	44	49	3rd	W				George Mutch	18
1938–39	Div 1	42	16	12	14	63	59	44	9th	QF		Charity Shield	R/U	Jimmy Dougal	19
1939–40	Div 1	3	0	2	1	0	2	2							
No competitive football was played between 1939 and 1946 due to the World War II
1945–46										R5					
1946–47	Div 1	42	18	11	13	76	74	47	7th	QF				Jimmy McIntosh	32
1947–48	Div 1	42	20	7	15	67	68	47	7th	QF				Andy McLaren	18
1948–49	Div 1	42	11	11	20	62	75	33	21st	R4				Bobby Langton	12
1949–50	Div 2	42	18	9	15	60	49	45	6th	R3				Eddy Brown	13
1950–51	Div 2	42	26	5	11	91	49	57	1st	R4				Charlie Wayman	29
1951–52	Div 1	42	17	12	13	74	54	46	7th	R3				Charlie Wayman	24
1952–53	Div 1	42	21	12	9	85	60	54	2nd	R4				Charlie Wayman	26
1953–54	Div 1	42	19	5	18	87	58	43	11th	R/U				Charlie Wayman	32
1954–55	Div 1	42	16	8	18	83	64	40	14th	R4				Jimmy Baxter	17
1955–56	Div 1	42	14	8	20	73	72	36	19th	R3				Tommy Thompson	24
1956–57	Div 1	42	23	10	9	84	56	56	3rd	R5				Tommy Thompson	29
1957–58	Div 1	42	26	7	9	100	51	56	2nd	R3				Tommy Thompson	34
1958–59	Div 1	42	17	7	18	70	77	41	12th	R5				Tommy Thompson	24
1959–60	Div 1	42	16	12	14	79	76	44	9th	QF				Tom Finney	21
1960–61	Div 1	42	10	10	22	43	71	30	22nd	R4	R3			Peter Thompson	12
1961–62	Div 2	42	15	10	17	55	57	40	10th	QF	R3			Alfie Biggs	22
1962–63	Div 2	42	13	11	18	59	74	37	17th	R3	R4			Alex Dawson	27
1963–64	Div 2	42	23	10	9	79	54	56	3rd	R/U	R2			Alex Dawson	36
1964–65	Div 2	42	14	13	15	76	81	41	12th	R4	R2			Alex Dawson	27
1965–66	Div 2	42	11	15	16	62	70	37	17th	QF	R4			Brian Godfrey	20
1966–67	Div 2	42	16	7	19	65	67	39	13th	R3	R3			Alex Dawson	13
1967–68	Div 2	42	12	11	19	43	65	35	20th	R4	R2			Derek Temple	8
1968–69	Div 2	42	12	15	15	38	44	39	14th	R4	R2			Willie Irvine	20
1969–70	Div 2	42	8	12	22	43	63	28	22nd	R3	R1			Archie Gemmill	6
1970–71	Div 3	46	22	17	7	63	39	61	1st	R1	R3			Gerry Ingram	24
1971–72	Div 2	42	12	12	18	52	58	36	18th	R4	R4			Hughie McIlmoyle	13
1972–73	Div 2	42	11	12	19	37	64	34	19th	R3	R1			Alex Bruce	13
1973–74	Div 2	42	9	14	19	40	62	31	21st	R3	R1			Alex Bruce	9
1974–75	Div 3	46	19	11	16	63	56	49	9th	R3	R3			Mel Holden	22
1975–76	Div 3	46	19	10	17	62	57	48	8th	R2	R2			Mike Elwiss	16
1976–77	Div 3	46	21	12	13	64	43	54	6th	R2	R1			Alex Bruce	26
1977–78	Div 3	46	20	16	10	63	38	56	3rd	R2	R2			Alex Bruce	30
1978–79	Div 2	42	12	18	12	59	57	42	7th	R4	R2			Alex Bruce	26
1979–80	Div 2	42	12	19	11	56	52	43	10th	R3	R2			Steve Elliott	23
1980–81	Div 2	42	11	14	17	41	62	36	20th	R3	R4			Alex Bruce	15
1981–82	Div 3	46	16	13	17	50	56	61	14th	R1	R2			Alex Bruce	19
1982–83	Div 3	46	15	13	18	60	69	58	16th	R3	R2			Steve Elliott	23
1983–84	Div 3	46	15	11	20	66	66	56	16th	R1	R3	League Trophy	R2	Steve Elliott	20
1984–85	Div 3	46	13	7	26	51	100	46	23rd	R2	R2	League Trophy	R1	Peter Houghton	9
1985–86	Div 4	46	11	10	25	54	89	43	23rd	R1	R2	League Trophy	GS	John Thomas; Gary Brazil	18
1986–87	Div 4	46	26	12	8	72	47	90	2nd	R4	R2	League Trophy	QF	John Thomas	28
1987–88	Div 3	46	15	13	18	48	59	58	16th	R1	R1	League Trophy	AF	Gary Brazil	20
1988–89	Div 3	46	19	15	12	79	60	72	6th	R1	R2	League Trophy	R1	Tony Ellis	20
1988–89	Div 3	46	19	15	12	79	60	72	6th	R1	R2	Play-off	SF	Tony Ellis	20
1989–90	Div 3	46	14	10	22	65	79	52	19th	R2	R1	League Trophy	R1	Warren Joyce	13
1990–91	Div 3	46	15	11	20	54	67	56	17th	R1	R1	League Trophy	AF	Graham Shaw	15
1991–92	Div 3	46	15	12	19	61	72	57	17th	R3	R1	League Trophy	R1	Graham Shaw	17
1992–93	Div 2	46	13	8	25	65	94	47	21st	R1	R1	League Trophy	GS	Tony Ellis	25
1993–94	Div 3	42	18	13	11	79	60	67	5th	R4	R1	League Trophy	R2	Tony Ellis	31
1993–94	Div 3	42	18	13	11	79	60	67	5th	R4	R1	Play-off	R/U	Tony Ellis	31
1994–95	Div 3	42	19	10	13	58	41	67	5th	R2	R1	League Trophy	GS	Mike Conroy	11
1994–95	Div 3	42	19	10	13	58	41	67	5th	R2	R1	Play-off	SF	Mike Conroy	11
1995–96	Div 3	46	23	17	6	78	38	86	1st	R2	R1	League Trophy	R2	Andy Saville	30
1996–97	Div 2	46	18	7	21	49	55	61	15th	R2	R2	League Trophy	R2	Dave Reeves	14
1997–98	Div 2	46	15	14	17	56	56	59	15th	R3	R2	League Trophy	ASF	Lee Ashcroft	16
1998–99	Div 2	46	22	13	11	78	50	79	5th	R3	R1	League Trophy	R2	Kurt Nogan	21
1998–99	Div 2	46	22	13	11	78	50	79	5th	R3	R1	Play-off	SF	Kurt Nogan	21
1999–2000	Div 2	46	28	11	7	74	37	95	1st	R5	R3	League Trophy	R2	Jon Macken	25
2000–01	Div 1	46	23	9	14	64	52	78	4th	R3	R2	Play-off	R/U	Jon Macken	22
2001–02	Div 1	46	20	12	14	71	59	72	8th	R5	R2			Richard Cresswell	16
2002–03	Div 1	46	16	13	17	68	70	61	12th	R3	R4			Richard Cresswell	16
2003–04	Div 1	46	15	14	17	69	71	59	15th	R4	R1			Ricardo Fuller	19
2004–05	Champ	46	21	12	13	67	58	75	5th	R3	R3	Play-off	R/U	Richard Cresswell	20
2005–06	Champ	46	20	20	6	59	30	80	4th	R5	R1	Play-off	SF	David Nugent	10
2006–07	Champ	46	22	8	16	64	53	74	7th	R5	R1			David Nugent	17
2007–08	Champ	46	15	11	20	50	56	56	15th	R5	R1			Neil Mellor	10
2008–09	Champ	46	21	11	14	66	54	74	6th	R3	R2	Play-off	SF	Neil Mellor	12
2009–10	Champ	46	13	15	18	58	73	54	17th	R4	R3			Jon Parkin	13
2010–11	Champ	46	10	12	24	54	79	42	22nd	R3	R3			Iain Hume	12
2011–12	L1	46	13	15	18	54	68	54	15th	R1	R3	League Trophy	ASF	Iain Hume	10
2012–13	L1	46	14	17	15	54	49	59	14th	R3	R3	League Trophy	ASF	Nicky Wroe	11
2013–14	L1	46	23	16	7	72	46	85	5th	R4	R2	League Trophy	R2	Joe Garner	24
2013–14	L1	46	23	16	7	72	46	85	5th	R4	R2	Play-off	SF	Joe Garner	24
2014–15	L1	46	25	14	7	79	40	89	3rd	R5	R2	League Trophy	AF	Joe Garner	26
2014–15	L1	46	25	14	7	79	40	89	3rd	R5	R2	Play-off	W	Joe Garner	26
2015–16	Champ	46	15	17	14	45	45	62	11th	QF	R4			Daniel Johnson	8
2016–17	Champ	46	16	14	16	64	63	62	11th	R3	R4			Jordan Hugill	13
2017–18	Champ	46	19	16	11	58	45	73	7th	R4	R1			Sean Maguire	10
2018–19	Champ	46	16	13	17	67	67	61	14th	R3	R3			Callum Robinson	13
2019–20	Champ	46	18	12	16	59	54	66	9th	R3	R3			Daniel Johnson	12
2020–21	Champ	46	18	7	21	49	56	61	13th	R3	R3			Scott Sinclair	9
2021–22	Champ	46	16	16	14	52	56	64	13th	R3	R4			Emil Riis Jakobsen	20
2022–23	Champ	46	17	12	17	45	59	63	12th	R4	R2			Ched Evans	9
2023–24	Champ	46	18	8	19	56	67	63	10th	R3	R1			Will Keane	11
2024–25	Champ	46	10	20	16	48	59	50	20th	QF	R1			Milutin Osmajic	15
2025–26	Champ	46	15	15	16	55	62	60	14th	R3	R2			Lewis Dobbin	11

- Seasons spent at Level 1 of football league system: 46
- Seasons spent at Level 2 of football league system: 52
- Seasons spent at Level 3 of football league system: 23
- Seasons spent at Level 4 of football league system: 5

== Key ==
- Pld = Matches played
- W = Matches won
- D = Matches drawn
- L = Matches lost
- GF = Goals for
- GA = Goals against
- Pts = Points
- Pos = Final position
- FL = Football League
- Div 1 = Football League First Division
- Div 2 = Football League Second Division
- Div 3 = Football League Third Division
- Div 4 = Football League Fourth Division
- Champ = EFL Championship
- FLT = EFL Trophy
- IR = Intermediate Round
- R1 = Round 1
- R2 = Round 2
- R3 = Round 3
- R4 = Round 4
- R5 = Round 5
- QF = Quarter-finals
- SF = Semi-finals
- R/U = Runners-up
- W= Winners

Champions	Runners-up	Play-offs	Promoted	Relegated
