= 1975–76 Preston North End F.C. season =

Preston North End's 1975–1976 season

Preston North End F.C.
1975–76 season
- Chairman: Alan R.W. Jones JP FRICS
- Manager: Bobby Charlton (until 21 August 1975); Harry Catterick
- Stadium: Deepdale
- Third Division: 8th
- FA Cup: Second round
- League Cup: Second round
- Top goalscorer: League: Mike Elwiss (15); Alex Bruce (15); All: Mike Elwiss (16)
- Highest home attendance: 11,503 vs. Blackburn Rovers
- Lowest home attendance: 4,621 vs. Chesterfield
- Average home league attendance: 7,072

During the 1975–76 English football season, Preston North End F.C. competed in the Football League Third Division.

== Final league table ==
Pos	Team	Pld	W	D	L	GF	GA	GAv	Pts
6	Wrexham	46	20	12	14	66	55	1.200	52
7	Walsall	46	18	14	14	74	61	1.213	50
8	Preston North End	46	19	10	17	62	57	1.088	48
9	Shrewsbury Town	46	19	10	17	61	59	1.034	48
10	Peterborough United	46	15	18	13	63	63	1.000	48

Rules for classification: 1) Points; 2) Goal average; 3) Goals scored

== Results ==
Preston North End's score comes first

=== Legend ===
Win	Draw	Loss

=== Football League Third Division ===
Date	Opponent	Venue	Result	Attendance	Scorers
16 August 1975	Colchester United	H	2-1	6,324	Treacy (2)
23 August 1975	Port Vale	A	1-1	4,282	Treacy
30 August 1975	Millwall	H	2-1	7,707	Treacy, Elwiss
06 September 1975	Gillingham	A	0-1	5,786	
13 September 1975	Walsall	H	3-1	7,015	Bruce, Treacy, Elwiss
20 September 1975	Aldershot	A	1-1	3,883	Bruce
22 September 1975	Southend United	A	2-0	4,583	Morley, Coleman
27 September 1975	Cardiff City	H	3-1	8,103	Treacy, Elwiss, Morley
04 October 1975	Chesterfield	A	0-3	4,384	
11 October 1975	Brighton & Hove Albion	A	0-1	14,375	
18 October 1975	Crystal Palace	H	0-0	10,971	
21 October 1975	Peterborough United	H	2-1	9,597	Bruce, Treacy
25 October 1975	Mansfield Town	A	1-0	6,677	Elwiss
01 November 1975	Hereford United	H	3-4	9,682	M.Baxter, Treacy, Morley
04 November 1975	Halifax Town	A	1-2	3,366	Morley
08 November 1975	Swindon Town	A	3-1	6,332	Bruce, Elwiss, Taylor (Own Goal)
15 November 1975	Bury	H	0-0	11,017	
29 November 1975	Grimsby Town	A	0-0	4,519	
06 December 1975	Wrexham	H	0-1	7,483	
20 December 1975	Sheffield Wednesday	A	2-2	8,553	Smith, Elwiss
27 December 1975	Chester City	A	0-3	8,137	
10 January 1976	Millwall	A	0-2	6,057	
13 January 1976	Rotherham United	H	3-2	6,289	Smith, Elwiss, Morley
17 January 1976	Aldershot	H	1-0	6,326	Earls (Own Goal)
24 January 1976	Walsall	A	1-3	6,721	Treacy
31 January 1976	Peterborough United	A	0-2	7,728	
03 February 1976	Shrewsbury Town	H	0-2	4,995	
07 February 1976	Halifax Town	H	2-1	5,480	Doyle, Elwiss
14 February 1976	Swindon Town	H	4-2	5,868	Brown, Smith, Treacy, Bruce
21 February 1976	Bury	A	0-2	7,049	
24 February 1976	Southend United	H	5-1	5,210	Smith (2), Treacy, Elwiss (2)
28 February 1976	Mansfield Town	H	0-2	6,945	
09 March 1976	Chesterfield	H	3-1	4,621	Elwiss, Bruce (2)
13 March 1976	Brighton & Hove Albion	H	1-0	6,720	Bruce
16 March 1976	Crystal Palace	A	0-2	22,213	
20 March 1976	Grimsby Town	H	0-0	6,586	
27 March 1976	Wrexham	A	2-1	4,906	Smith, Bruce
30 March 1976	Sheffield Wednesday	H	4-2	6,899	McMahon, Elwiss, Bruce (2)
03 April 1976	Colchester United	A	1-1	2,657	Elwiss
07 April 1976	Cardiff City	A	0-1	12,447	
10 April 1976	Gillingham	H	4-0	6,349	McMahon, Smith, Bruce (2)
17 April 1976	Shrewsbury Town	A	0-1	3,547	
19 April 1976	Chester City	H	0-0	6,719	
20 April 1976	Rotherham United	A	1-1	4,874	Coleman
24 April 1976	Port Vale	H	3-0	5,783	Elwiss, Bruce (2)
28 April 1976	Hereford United	A	1-3	7,592	Elwiss

=== FA Cup ===
Round	Date	Opponent	Venue	Result	Attendance	Goalscorers
r1	22 November 1975	Scunthorpe United	H	2-1	8,119	Elwiss, Morley
r2	13 December 1975	Scarborough	A	2-3	4,100	Smith (2)

=== League Cup ===
Round	Date	Opponent	Venue	Result	Attendance	Goalscorers
r1-1	19 August 1975	Blackburn Rovers	H	2-0	11,503	Treacy, Morley
r1-2	27 August 1975	Blackburn Rovers	A	0-0	14,077	
r2	09 September 1975	Hull City	A	2-4	5,095	Treacy, Morley

== Statistics ==
=== Appearances and goals ===
No.	Pos	Nat	Player	Total		Division Three		FA Cup		EFL Cup	
No.	Pos	Nat	Player	Apps	Goals	Apps	Goals	Apps	Goals	Apps	Goals
	MF	(Scotland) SCO	Alan Lamb	11	0	8	0	0	0	3	0
	FW	(Scotland) SCO	Alex Bruce	42	15	38 + 2	15	1	0	1	0
	DF	(Scotland) SCO	Alex Spark	37	0	29 + 3	0	2	0	3	0
	DF	(Scotland) SCO	Danny Cameron	1	0	0 + 1	0	0	0	0	0
	DF	(England) ENG	David Sadler	31	0	28 + 1	0	2	0	0	0
	DF	(Scotland) SCO	Francis Burns	32	0	27	0	2	0	3	0
	DF	(England) ENG	Gary Williams	49	0	44	0	2	0	3	0
	MF	(England) ENG	Gordon Coleman	21	2	15 + 5	2	1	0	0	0
	MF	(Scotland) SCO	James Brown	30	1	29	1	1	0	0	0
	DF	(England) ENG	John Bird	4	0	2	0	0	0	2	0
	DF	(England) ENG	John McMahon	46	2	41	2	2	0	3	0
	FW	(England) ENG	John Smith	30	9	27 + 1	7	1 + 1	2	0	0
	DF	(Republic of Ireland) IRL	Mark Lawrenson	25	0	24	0	1	0	0	0
	FW	(England) ENG	Michael Robinson	2	0	1 + 1	0	0	0	0	0
	DF	(England) ENG	Mick Baxter	17	1	16 + 1	1	0	0	0	0
	FW	(England) ENG	Mike Elwiss	51	16	46	15	2	1	3	0
	FW	(Republic of Ireland) IRL	Ray Treacy	32	13	27 + 1	11	1	0	3	2
	FW	(England) ENG	Richard Thomson	2	0	1 + 1	0	0	0	0	0
	GK	(England) ENG	Roy Tunks	48	0	43	0	2	0	3	0
	MF	(England) ENG	Royston Taylor	3	0	3	0	0	0	0	0
	MF	(Wales) WAL	Steve Doyle	24	1	24	1	0	0	0	0
	DF	(Scotland) SCO	Stuart Baxter	8	0	5	0	0	0	3	0
	GK	(Scotland) SCO	Tom Clarke	3	0	3	0	0	0	0	0
	MF	(England) ENG	Tony Morley	30	8	25	5	2	1	3	2

== Awards and Nominations ==
=== Club Awards ===
Award	Player	Notes	Ref.
Player of the Year	(England) Gary Williams		
