= 1974–75 Preston North End F.C. season =

Preston North End's 1974–1975 season

Preston North End F.C.
1974–75 season
- Chairman: Alan R.W. Jones JP FRICS
- Manager: Bobby Charlton
- Stadium: Deepdale
- Third Division: 9th
- FA Cup: Third round
- League Cup: Third round
- Top goalscorer: League: Mel Holden (17); All: Mel Holden (22)
- Highest home attendance: 18,682 vs. Carlisle United
- Lowest home attendance: 5,819 vs. Watford
- Average home league attendance: 9,906

During the 1974–75 English football season, Preston North End F.C. competed in the Football League Third Division.

== Final league table ==
Pos	Team	Pld	W	D	L	GF	GA	GAv	Pts
7	Peterborough United	46	19	12	15	47	53	0.887	50
8	Walsall	46	18	13	15	67	52	1.288	49
9	Preston North End	46	19	11	16	63	56	1.125	49
10	Gillingham	46	17	14	15	65	60	1.083	48
11	Colchester United	46	17	13	16	70	63	1.111	47

Rules for classification: 1) Points; 2) Goal average; 3) Goals scored

== Results ==
Preston North End's score comes first

=== Legend ===
Win	Draw	Loss

=== Football League Third Division ===
Date	Opponent	Venue	Result	Attendance	Scorers
17 August 1974	Plymouth Argyle	H	1-0	11,663	Morley
24 August 1974	Watford	A	2-3	8,918	Elwiss, Holden
31 August 1974	Walsall	H	3-2	7,446	Charlton, Morley, Elwiss
03 September 1974	Bury	H	3-0	10,404	Charlton (2), Holden
07 September 1974	Aldershot	A	2-1	6,357	Morley, Holden
14 September 1974	Blackburn Rovers	H	0-0	18,042	
17 September 1974	Charlton Athletic	H	2-0	11,869	Morley, Elwiss
21 September 1974	Peterborough United	A	0-0	13,120	
24 September 1974	Crystal Palace	A	0-1	19,680	
28 September 1974	AFC Bournemouth	H	5-2	10,421	Burns, Lamb, Elwiss, Holden, Charlton
01 October 1974	Bury	A	0-2	11,914	
05 October 1974	Hereford United	A	2-2	11,488	John Bird, Holden
12 October 1974	Colchester United	H	0-2	10,259	
19 October 1974	Brighton & Hove Albion	A	4-0	16,413	Morley, Elwiss, Holden (2)
22 October 1974	Gillingham	H	1-0	9,867	John Bird
26 October 1974	Grimsby Town	H	2-0	9,934	Morley, Charlton
02 November 1974	Halifax Town	A	0-3	4,878	
06 November 1974	Gillingham	A	1-2	10,494	Elwiss
09 November 1974	Southend United	H	1-4	8,295	Elwiss
15 November 1974	Tranmere Rovers	A	1-3	6,534	Holden
30 November 1974	Huddersfield Town	H	4-0	7,958	Elwiss, Holden (2), Charlton
07 December 1974	Wrexham	A	1-1	8,226	Holden
21 December 1974	Port Vale	H	1-0	8,743	John Bird
26 December 1974	Blackburn Rovers	A	0-3	24,005	
28 December 1974	Chesterfield	H	2-1	9,258	Charlton, Darling (Own Goal)
11 January 1975	Wrexham	H	3-1	9,293	Morley, Elwiss, Holden
18 January 1975	Huddersfield Town	A	1-0	7,654	Charlton
01 February 1975	Southend United	A	1-1	9,134	Holden
08 February 1975	Halifax Town	H	1-0	9,786	Holden
15 February 1975	Swindon Town	A	0-1	11,892	
18 February 1975	Swindon Town	H	2-0	11,139	Morley, Elwiss
22 February 1975	Tranmere Rovers	H	1-0	10,798	Holden
28 February 1975	Walsall	A	0-2	10,151	
08 March 1975	Crystal Palace	H	1-1	12,119	Coleman
15 March 1975	AFC Bournemouth	A	0-1	7,337	
18 March 1975	Plymouth Argyle	A	1-2	22,063	Charlton
22 March 1975	Aldershot	H	3-1	7,474	McMahon, John Bird, Holden
29 March 1975	Port Vale	A	1-2	6,583	Tartt (Own Goal)
31 March 1975	Chesterfield	A	0-0	8,705	
01 April 1975	Peterborough United	H	1-1	6,507	John Bird
05 April 1975	Grimsby Town	A	1-2	6,221	Elwiss
12 April 1975	Hereford United	H	2-2	6,528	Burns, Morley
19 April 1975	Colchester United	A	2-2	5,228	Smith, Morley
22 April 1975	Watford	H	2-2	5,819	John Bird, Burns
26 April 1975	Brighton & Hove Albion	H	1-0	6,222	Winstanley (Own Goal)
29 April 1975	Charlton Athletic	A	1-3	24,195	Coleman

=== FA Cup ===
Round	Date	Opponent	Venue	Result	Attendance	Goalscorers
r1	23 November 1974	Blyth Spartans	A	1-1	8,500	Holden
r1r	26 November 1974	Blyth Spartans	H	5-1	10,101	Elwiss (2), Holden (3)
r2	14 December 1974	Bishop Auckland	A	2-0	6,500	Morley, Charlton
r3	04 January 1975	Carlisle United	H	0-1	18,682	

=== League Cup ===
Round	Date	Opponent	Venue	Result	Attendance	Goalscorers
r1	20 August 1974	Rochdale	H	1-0	7,780	Holden
r2	10 September 1974	Sunderland	H	2-0	13,279	Morley, Charlton
r3	09 October 1974	Chester City	A	0-1	11,262	

== Statistics ==
=== Appearances and goals ===
No.	Pos	Nat	Player	Total		Division Three		FA Cup		EFL Cup	
No.	Pos	Nat	Player	Apps	Goals	Apps	Goals	Apps	Goals	Apps	Goals
	MF	(Scotland) SCO	Alan Lamb	32	1	25	1	4	0	3	0
	DF	(Scotland) SCO	Alex Spark	39	0	36	0	0	0	3	0
	MF	(England) ENG	Bobby Charlton	45	10	38	8	4	1	3	1
	DF	(England) ENG	David Sadler	36	0	29	0	4	0	3	0
	DF	(Scotland) SCO	Francis Burns	52	3	45	3	4	0	3	0
	DF	(England) ENG	Gary Williams	11	0	10	0	0	0	1	0
	MF	(England) ENG	Gordon Coleman	17	2	10 + 7	2	0	0	0	0
	GK	(England) ENG	John Brown	22	0	19	0	0	0	3	0
	DF	(England) ENG	John Bird	53	6	46	6	4	0	3	0
	DF	(England) ENG	John McMahon	27	1	25	1	0	0	2	0
	FW	(England) ENG	John Smith	6	1	3 + 3	1	0	0	0	0
	DF	(England) ENG	Mark Fielding	13	0	9	0	4	0	0	0
	DF	(Republic of Ireland) IRL	Mark Lawrenson	3	0	3	0	0	0	0	0
	FW	(Scotland) SCO	Mel Holden	49	22	42	17	3 + 1	4	3	1
	DF	(England) ENG	Mick Baxter	1	0	1	0	0	0	0	0
	FW	(England) ENG	Mike Elwiss	51	13	43 + 1	11	4	2	3	0
	MF	(England) ENG	Nobby Stiles	21	0	17 + 2	0	2	0	0	0
	FW	(Republic of Ireland) IRL	Ray Treacy	10	0	8 + 2	0	0	0	0	0
	FW	(England) ENG	Richard Thomson	7	0	6 + 1	0	0	0	0	0
	GK	(England) ENG	Roy Tunks	31	0	27	0	4	0	0	0
	MF	(Wales) WAL	Steve Doyle	17	0	12 + 1	0	4	0	0	0
	DF	(Scotland) SCO	Stuart Baxter	11	0	8 + 3	0	0	0	0	0
	MF	(England) ENG	Tony Morley	52	12	44 + 1	10	3 + 1	1	3	1

== Awards and nominations ==
=== Club awards ===
Award	Player	Notes	Ref.
Player of the Year	(England) Mike Elwiss		
