= 1976–77 Preston North End F.C. season =

Preston North End's 1976–1977 season

Preston North End F.C.
1976–77 season
- Chairman: Alan R.W. Jones JP FRICS
- Manager: Harry Catterick
- Stadium: Deepdale
- Third Division: 6th
- FA Cup: Second round
- League Cup: Second round
- Top goalscorer: League: Alex Bruce (24); All: Alex Bruce (26)
- Highest home attendance: 11,753 vs. Sheffield Wednesday
- Lowest home attendance: 4,879 vs. Reading
- Average home league attendance: 7,987

During the 1976–77 English football season, Preston North End F.C. competed in the Football League Third Division.

== Final league table ==
Pos	Team	Pld	W	D	L	GF	GA	GD	Pts
4	Rotherham United	46	22	15	9	69	44	+25	59
5	Wrexham	46	24	10	12	80	54	+26	58
6	Preston North End	46	21	12	13	64	43	+21	54
7	Bury	46	23	8	15	64	59	+5	54
8	Sheffield Wednesday	46	22	9	15	65	55	+10	53

Source: rsssf.com

== Results ==
Preston North End's score comes first

=== Legend ===
Win	Draw	Loss

=== Football League Third Division ===
Date	Opponent	Venue	Result	Attendance	Scorers
21 August 1976	Mansfield Town	A	1-3	5,688	Elwiss
28 August 1976	Brighton & Hove Albion	H	1-1	6,265	Mitchell
04 September 1976	Oxford United	A	2-2	4,580	Elwiss (2)
11 September 1976	Chester City	A	0-0	4,326	
14 September 1976	Port Vale	H	4-0	6,592	Coleman, Elwiss, Bruce (2)
18 September 1976	Rotherham United	H	0-0	7,812	
25 September 1976	Grimsby Town	A	0-1	4,100	
02 October 1976	York City	H	4-2	6,380	Burns, Elwiss (2), Bruce
08 October 1976	Tranmere Rovers	A	0-0	5,005	
12 October 1976	Peterborough United	H	6-2	5,761	Mitchell, Elwiss, Bruce (3), Smith
16 October 1976	Crystal Palace	H	2-1	10,524	Elwiss
23 October 1976	Bury	A	2-3	8,724	Bruce (2)
30 October 1976	Gillingham	A	1-1	5,070	Bruce
01 November 1976	Port Vale	A	0-0	4,686	
06 November 1976	Northampton Town	H	3-0	7,306	Coleman, Elwiss (2)
13 November 1976	Reading	A	2-0	6,816	Elwiss, Bruce
27 November 1976	Lincoln City	H	3-0	7,964	Elwiss, Bruce (2)
04 December 1976	Portsmouth	A	0-0	9,238	
17 December 1976	Shrewsbury Town	H	2-1	7,809	Sadler, Lawrenson
27 December 1976	Walsall	A	1-0	8,769	Bruce
01 January 1977	Northampton Town	A	1-0	5,024	Bruce
15 January 1977	Peterborough United	A	0-0	5,308	
22 January 1977	Mansfield Town	H	1-2	11,110	Elwiss
29 January 1977	Chesterfield	A	1-1	4,992	Bruce
05 February 1977	Brighton & Hove Albion	A	0-2	21,265	
08 February 1977	Swindon Town	H	2-0	9,409	Brown, Bruce
12 February 1977	Oxford United	H	2-1	9,950	J. Smith, Elwiss
19 February 1977	Chester City	H	3-4	10,101	Elwiss (2), Bruce
26 February 1977	Rotherham United	A	0-2	8,860	
05 March 1977	Grimsby Town	H	2-1	7,278	Brown, Bruce
12 March 1977	York City	A	2-0	3,575	J. Smith, Elwiss
15 March 1977	Wrexham	H	2-1	10,491	Bruce (2)
19 March 1977	Tranmere Rovers	H	1-0	9,100	Coleman
22 March 1977	Crystal Palace	A	0-1	15,225	
29 March 1977	Sheffield Wednesday	H	4-1	11,753	Lawrenson, J. Smith, Elwiss, Bruce
02 April 1977	Bury	H	0-1	9,793	
09 April 1977	Wrexham	A	0-2	10,545	
11 April 1977	Walsall	H	0-1	7,850	
16 April 1977	Sheffield Wednesday	A	0-1	13,217	
19 April 1977	Chesterfield	H	2-2	5,288	Baxter, Thomson
23 April 1977	Reading	H	3-0	4,872	Thomson (2), Bruce
26 April 1977	Gillingham	H	1-0	4,943	Elwiss
30 April 1977	Lincoln City	A	0-2	5,357	
03 May 1977	Swindon Town	A	1-0	4,366	Elwiss
07 May 1977	Portsmouth	H	0-0	5,352	
14 May 1977	Shrewsbury Town	A	2-1	2,849	Coleman, Bruce

=== FA Cup ===
Round	Date	Opponent	Venue	Result	Attendance	Goalscorers
r1	20 November 1976	Crewe Alexandra	A	1-1	6,373	Coleman
r1r	23 November 1976	Crewe Alexandra	H	2-2 (AET)	10,833	Bruce (2)
r1r2	29 November 1976	Crewe Alexandra	N	3-0	7,334	Elwiss, Brown, Sadler
r2	14 December 1976	Halifax Town	A	0-1	5,219	

=== League Cup ===
Round	Date	Opponent	Venue	Result	Attendance	Goalscorers
r1-1	14 August 1976	Bury	A	1-2	5,858	Brown
r1-2	17 August 1976	Bury	H	1-1	7,649	J.Smith

== Statistics ==
=== Appearances and goals ===
No.	Pos	Nat	Player	Total		Division Three		FA Cup		EFL Cup	
No.	Pos	Nat	Player	Apps	Goals	Apps	Goals	Apps	Goals	Apps	Goals
	MF	(Scotland) SCO	Alan Lamb	4	0	3 + 1	0	0	0	0	0
	FW	(Scotland) SCO	Alex Bruce	52	26	46	24	4	2	2	0
	GK	(England) ENG	Alex Smith	8	0	8	0	0	0	0	0
	FW	(Scotland) SCO	Barrie Mitchell	14	2	7 + 4	2	0 + 2	0	0 + 1	0
	DF	(Scotland) SCO	Danny Cameron	18	0	14 + 1	0	2	0	0 + 1	0
	DF	(England) ENG	David Sadler	26	2	20	1	4	1	2	0
	DF	(Scotland) SCO	Francis Burns	48	1	44	1	4	0	0	0
	DF	(England) ENG	Gary Williams	48	0	44	0	2	0	2	0
	MF	(England) ENG	Gordon Coleman	50	4	44	3	4	1	2	0
	FW	(Scotland) SCO	Ian Cochrane	1	1	1	1	0	0	0	0
	MF	(Scotland) SCO	James Brown	37	4	33	2	2	1	2	1
	DF	(England) ENG	John McMahon	38	0	31 + 1	0	4	0	2	0
	FW	(England) ENG	John Smith	40	4	34 + 1	3	4	0	1	1
	DF	(Republic of Ireland) IRL	Mark Lawrenson	52	2	46	2	4	0	2	0
	FW	(England) ENG	Michael Robinson	1	0	0	0	0	0	1	0
	DF	(England) ENG	Mick Baxter	26	1	26	1	0	0	0	0
	FW	(England) ENG	Mike Elwiss	51	22	45	21	4	1	2	0
	FW	(England) ENG	Richard Thomson	7	3	4 + 3	3	0	0	0	0
	GK	(England) ENG	Roy Tunks	44	0	38	0	4	0	2	0
	MF	(Wales) WAL	Steve Doyle	26	0	18 + 4	0	2	0	2	0

== Awards and Nominations ==
=== Club Awards ===
Award	Player	Notes	Ref.
Player of the Year	(Republic of Ireland) Mark Lawrenson		

=== National Awards ===
Award	Player	Notes	Ref.
Manager of the Month	Harry Catterick	March 1977	
