= 1977–78 Preston North End F.C. season =

Preston North End's 1977–1978 season

Preston North End
1977–78 season
- Chairman: Alan R.W. Jones JP FRICS
- Manager: Nobby Stiles
- Stadium: Deepdale
- Third Division: 3rd
- FA Cup: Second round
- League Cup: Second round
- Top goalscorer: League: Alex Bruce (27); All: Alex Bruce (30)
- Highest home attendance: 16,078 vs. Shrewsbury Town
- Lowest home attendance: 5,319 vs. Cambridge United
- Average home league attendance: 8,799

During the 1977–78 English football season, Preston North End F.C. competed in the Football League Third Division.

== Final league table ==
| Pos | Team | Pld | W | D | L | GF | GA | GD | Pts | Promotion or relegation |
|---|---|---|---|---|---|---|---|---|---|---|
| 1 | Wrexham (C, P) | 46 | 23 | 15 | 8 | 78 | 45 | +33 | 61 | Cup Winners' Cup first round and promotion to the Second Division (Note: Wrexham qualified for the European Cup Winners' Cup as the Welsh Cup winners.) |
| 2 | Cambridge United (P) | 46 | 23 | 12 | 11 | 72 | 51 | +21 | 58 | Promotion to the Second Division |
| 3 | Preston North End (P) | 46 | 20 | 16 | 10 | 63 | 38 | +25 | 56 | Promotion to the Second Division |
| 4 | Peterborough United | 46 | 20 | 16 | 10 | 47 | 33 | +14 | 56 | |
| 5 | Chester | 46 | 16 | 22 | 8 | 59 | 56 | +3 | 54 | |

Source: rsssf.com
(C) Champions; (P) Promoted

== Results ==
Preston North End's score comes first

=== Legend ===
| Win | Draw | Loss |

=== Football League Third Division ===
| Date | Opponent | Venue | Result | Attendance | Scorers |
|---|---|---|---|---|---|
| 20 August 1977 | Plymouth Argyle | A | 0-0 | 7,154 | |
| 27 August 1977 | Rotherham United | H | 3-2 | 5,964 | Thomson, Doyle, Bruce |
| 03 September 1977 | Oxford United | A | 0-1 | 4,804 | |
| 10 September 1977 | Carlisle United | A | 1-3 | 5,743 | Bruce |
| 13 September 1977 | Swindon Town | H | 1-1 | 6,014 | Robinson |
| 17 September 1977 | Hereford United | H | 0-0 | 5,447 | |
| 24 September 1977 | Colchester United | A | 0-0 | 4,978 | |
| 27 September 1977 | Walsall | A | 0-0 | 5,138 | |
| 01 October 1977 | Cambridge United | H | 2-0 | 5,319 | Bruce, Baxter |
| 04 October 1977 | Sheffield Wednesday | H | 2-1 | 7,627 | Elwiss, Cross |
| 08 October 1977 | Bradford City | A | 1-1 | 5,815 | Smith |
| 15 October 1977 | Gillingham | H | 2-0 | 7,212 | Elwiss, Smith |
| 22 October 1977 | Exeter City | A | 0-2 | 5,444 | |
| 25 October 1977 | Tranmere Rovers | H | 2-1 | 7,906 | Baxter, Elwiss |
| 29 October 1977 | Chester City | H | 2-1 | 7,550 | Bruce 2 |
| 05 November 1977 | Port Vale | A | 0-0 | 4,208 | |
| 12 November 1977 | Wrexham | H | 1-3 | 10,342 | Bruce |
| 19 November 1977 | Lincoln City | A | 2-2 | 3,924 | Bruce 2 |
| 03 December 1977 | Portsmouth | H | 3-1 | 5,936 | Bruce, Elwiss, Smith |
| 10 December 1977 | Shrewsbury Town | A | 0-0 | 3,764 | |
| 26 December 1977 | Bury | H | 4-0 | 10,297 | Bruce 2 (1 pen), Elwiss, Coleman |
| 27 December 1977 | Chesterfield | A | 1-0 | 6,484 | Bruce |
| 31 December 1977 | Peterborough United | A | 0-1 | 7,134 | |
| 02 January 1978 | Port Vale | H | 2-0 | 10,930 | Thomson, Bruce |
| 06 January 1978 | Tranmere Rovers | A | 0-1 | 7,254 | |
| 14 January 1978 | Plymouth Argyle | H | 5-2 | 7,065 | Baxter, Bruce, Coleman, Thomson, Elwiss |
| 04 February 1978 | Carlisle United | H | 2-1 | 9,095 | Bruce (2 pen) |
| 11 February 1978 | Hereford United | A | 0-0 | 4,791 | |
| 21 February 1978 | Oxford United | H | 3-2 | 6,189 | Thomson 2, Bruce |
| 25 February 1978 | Cambridge United | A | 1-1 | 5,766 | Thomson |
| 28 February 1978 | Colchester United | H | 4-0 | 9,225 | Bruce 4 (2 pen) |
| 04 March 1978 | Bradford City | H | 3-1 | 11,920 | McMahon, Elwiss 2 |
| 07 March 1978 | Swindon Town | A | 2-0 | 10,211 | Baxter, Bruce |
| 11 March 1978 | Gillingham | A | 1-2 | 9,568 | Coleman |
| 18 March 1978 | Exeter City | H | 0-0 | 9,189 | |
| 24 March 1978 | Chester City | A | 2-1 | 7,864 | Bruce, Elwiss |
| 25 March 1978 | Chesterfield | H | 0-0 | 10,922 | |
| 27 March 1978 | Bury | A | 1-1 | 9,783 | Thomson |
| 01 April 1978 | Peterborough United | H | 0-1 | 9,695 | |
| 04 April 1978 | Walsall | H | 1-0 | 11,239 | Paul (og) |
| 08 April 1978 | Wrexham | A | 0-0 | 19,088 | |
| 15 April 1978 | Lincoln City | H | 4-0 | 11,208 | Robinson, Baxter, Bruce, Coleman |
| 18 April 1978 | Sheffield Wednesday | A | 0-1 | 12,426 | |
| 22 April 1978 | Portsmouth | A | 2-0 | 6,866 | Bruce, Elwiss |
| 25 April 1978 | Rotherham United | A | 1-2 | 5,646 | Bruce |
| 29 April 1978 | Shrewsbury Town | H | 2-2 | 16,078 | Elwiss, Bruce |

=== FA Cup ===
| Round | Date | Opponent | Venue | Result | Attendance | Goalscorers |
|---|---|---|---|---|---|---|
| r1 | 26 November 1977 | Lincoln City | H | 3-2 | 6,965 | Elwiss (2), Bruce |
| r2 | 17 December 1977 | Wrexham | H | 0-2 | 11,134 | |

=== League Cup ===
| Round | Date | Opponent | Venue | Result | Attendance | Goalscorers |
|---|---|---|---|---|---|---|
| r1-1 | 13 August 1977 | Port Vale | A | 1-2 | 4,530 | Bruce |
| r1-2 | 17 August 1977 | Port Vale | H | 2-1 | 5,816 | Elwiss (2) |
| r1r | 23 August 1977 | Port Vale | N | 2-1 | 2,201 | Elwiss, Bruce |
| r2 | 31 August 1977 | Walsall | A | 0-0 | 5,445 | |
| r2r | 06 September 1977 | Walsall | H | 0-1 (AET) | 7,079 | |

== Statistics ==
=== Appearances and goals ===
| No. | Pos | Nat | Player | Total | | Division Three | | FA Cup | | EFL Cup | |
| No. | Pos | Nat | Player | Apps | Goals | Apps | Goals | Apps | Goals | Apps | Goals |
|---|---|---|---|---|---|---|---|---|---|---|---|
| | MF | (England) ENG | Alan Spavin | 6 | 0 | 1 + 4 | 0 | 0 + 1 | 0 | 0 | 0 |
| | FW | (Scotland) SCO | Alex Bruce | 52 | 30 | 45 | 27 | 2 | 1 | 5 | 2 |
| | DF | (Scotland) SCO | Danny Cameron | 42 | 0 | 40 | 0 | 2 | 0 | 0 | 0 |
| | DF | (Scotland) SCO | Francis Burns | 43 | 0 | 36 + 2 | 0 | 2 | 0 | 3 | 0 |
| | MF | (England) ENG | Gordon Coleman | 51 | 4 | 45 | 4 | 2 | 0 | 4 | 0 |
| | DF | (England) ENG | Graham Cross | 45 | 1 | 40 | 1 | 0 | 0 | 5 | 0 |
| | DF | (England) ENG | Harry Wilson | 23 | 0 | 18 | 0 | 0 | 0 | 5 | 0 |
| | MF | (Scotland) SCO | James Brown | 5 | 0 | 2 | 0 | 0 | 0 | 3 | 0 |
| | DF | (England) ENG | John McMahon | 37 | 1 | 30 | 1 | 2 | 0 | 5 | 0 |
| | FW | (England) ENG | John Smith | 19 | 3 | 14 + 1 | 3 | 2 | 0 | 2 | 0 |
| | FW | (England) ENG | Michael Robinson | 10 | 3 | 8 + 2 | 3 | 0 | 0 | 0 | 0 |
| | DF | (England) ENG | Mick Baxter | 52 | 5 | 45 | 5 | 2 | 0 | 5 | 0 |
| | FW | (England) ENG | Mike Elwiss | 53 | 17 | 46 | 12 | 2 | 2 | 5 | 3 |
| | FW | (England) ENG | Richard Thomson | 30 | 6 | 25 + 1 | 6 | 0 | 0 | 3 + 1 | 0 |
| | GK | (England) ENG | Roy Tunks | 53 | 0 | 46 | 0 | 2 | 0 | 5 | 0 |
| | MF | (England) ENG | Sean Haslegrave | 40 | 0 | 38 | 0 | 2 | 0 | 0 | 0 |
| | MF | (Wales) WAL | Steve Doyle | 39 | 1 | 25 + 7 | 1 | 2 | 0 | 5 | 0 |
| | DF | (England) ENG | Steve Uzelac | 2 | 0 | 2 | 0 | 0 | 0 | 0 | 0 |

== Awards and Nominations ==
=== Club Awards ===
| Award | Player | Notes | Ref. |
|---|---|---|---|
| Player of the Year | (England) Mike Elwiss | | |
