= 1973–74 Preston North End F.C. season =

Preston North End's 1973–1974 season

Preston North End
1973–74 season
- Chairman: Alan R.W. Jones JP FRICS
- Manager: Bobby Charlton
- Stadium: Deepdale
- Second Division: 21st
- FA Cup: Third round
- League Cup: First round
- Top goalscorer: League: Alex Bruce (9); All: Alex Bruce (9)
- Highest home attendance: 21,747 vs. Sunderland
- Lowest home attendance: 7,650 vs. Orient
- Average home league attendance: 12,171

During the 1973–74 English football season, Preston North End F.C. competed in the Football League Second Division.

== Final league table ==
Pos	Team	Pld	W	D	L	GF	GA	GAv	Pts	Qualification or relegation
18	Oxford United	42	10	16	16	35	46	0.761	36	
19	Sheffield Wednesday	42	12	11	19	51	63	0.810	35	
20	Crystal Palace (R)	42	11	12	19	43	56	0.768	34	Relegation to the Third Division
21	Preston North End (R)	42	9	14	19	40	62	0.645	31	Relegation to the Third Division
22	Swindon Town (R)	42	7	11	24	36	72	0.500	25	Relegation to the Third Division

Rules for classification: 1) Points; 2) Goal average; 3) Goals scored
(R) Relegated

== Results ==
Preston North End's score comes first

=== Legend ===
Win	Draw	Loss

=== Football League Second Division ===
Date	Opponent	Venue	Result	Attendance	Scorers
25 August 1973	Aston Villa	A	0-2	28,861	
01 September 1973	Swindon Town	H	1-1	12,304	Bruce
08 September 1973	Hull City	A	0-1	7,009	
11 September 1973	Millwall	H	2-0	10,325	Holden, Burns
15 September 1973	Bristol City	H	1-1	10,790	Young
18 September 1973	West Bromwich Albion	A	2-0	11,822	Bruce, Holden
22 September 1973	Nottingham Forest	A	1-1	12,598	Burns
29 September 1973	Portsmouth	H	2-1	10,640	Baxter, Bruce
01 October 1973	West Bromwich Albion	H	3-1	15,419	McMahon, Young (2)
06 October 1973	Fulham	A	0-0	10,520	
13 October 1973	Sunderland	H	1-0	21,747	Young
20 October 1973	Notts County	A	1-2	12,479	Williams
22 October 1973	Millwall	A	1-5	7,625	Burns
27 October 1973	Cardiff City	H	2-2	12,050	Spark, Bruce
03 November 1973	Orient	A	2-2	12,484	Bruce (2)
10 November 1973	Blackpool	H	1-3	21,580	Bruce
17 November 1973	Oxford United	A	1-1	6,750	Bruce
24 November 1973	Luton Town	H	2-2	10,279	Young (2)
08 December 1973	Bolton Wanderers	H	2-1	14,715	Bruce, Young
11 December 1973	Middlesbrough	A	0-3	23,980	
15 December 1973	Crystal Palace	H	1-1	9,121	Sadler
22 December 1973	Portsmouth	A	0-3	13,957	
26 December 1973	Carlisle United	H	0-1	11,446	
29 December 1973	Hull City	H	2-0	10,050	Holden (2)
01 January 1974	Swindon Town	A	1-3	8,299	Williams
12 January 1974	Bristol City	A	0-0	11,450	
19 January 1974	Aston Villa	H	0-0	10,766	
03 February 1974	Crystal Palace	A	0-2	24,575	
10 February 1974	Nottingham Forest	H	2-1	13,486	John Bird, Richardson (Own Goal)
16 February 1974	Sunderland	A	1-2	21,129	Stiles
23 February 1974	Fulham	H	0-1	9,412	
02 March 1974	Carlisle United	A	2-2	7,671	Elwiss (2)
09 March 1974	Cardiff City	A	0-2	7,216	
16 March 1974	Notts County	H	0-2	8,907	
23 March 1974	Blackpool	A	0-3	13,243	
30 March 1974	Orient	H	0-1	7,650	
06 April 1974	Luton Town	A	2-4	11,806	Burns, Sadler
12 April 1974	Sheffield Wednesday	H	0-0	11,286	
13 April 1974	Oxford United	H	0-0	7,707	
15 April 1974	Sheffield Wednesday	A	0-1	17,332	
20 April 1974	Bolton Wanderers	A	2-0	17,273	John Bird, Elwiss
27 April 1974	Middlesbrough	H	2-4	16,177	Elwiss (2)

=== FA Cup ===
Round	Date	Opponent	Venue	Result	Attendance	Goalscorers
r3	05 January 1974	Fulham	A	0-1	6,937	

=== League Cup ===
Round	Date	Opponent	Venue	Result	Attendance	Goalscorers
r1	28 August 1973	Bolton Wanderers	A	1-1	17,101	Young
r1r	03 September 1973	Bolton Wanderers	H	0-2 (AET)	18,571	

== Statistics ==
=== Appearances and goals ===
No.	Pos	Nat	Player	Total		Division Two		FA Cup		EFL Cup	
No.	Pos	Nat	Player	Apps	Goals	Apps	Goals	Apps	Goals	Apps	Goals
	GK	(Republic of Ireland) IRL	Alan Kelly Sr.	7	0	5	0	0	0	2	0
	MF	(Scotland) SCO	Alan Lamb	21	0	19 + 1	0	0	0	0 + 1	0
	MF	(England) ENG	Alan Spavin	8	0	4 + 2	0	0	0	2	0
	FW	(Scotland) SCO	Alex Bruce	28	9	26	9	1	0	1	0
	DF	(Scotland) SCO	Alex Spark	20	1	17 + 2	1	0	0	1	0
	MF	(England) ENG	Dave Wilson	1	0	1	0	0	0	0	0
	MF	(England) ENG	David Carrick	2	0	0 + 2	0	0	0	0	0
	DF	(England) ENG	David Sadler	28	2	27	2	1	0	0	0
	DF	(England) ENG	Eric Snookes	14	0	13	0	1	0	0	0
	DF	(Scotland) SCO	Francis Burns	45	4	42	4	1	0	2	0
	GK	(England) ENG	Gary Hudson	1	0	1	0	0	0	0	0
	DF	(England) ENG	Gary Williams	11	2	6 + 5	2	0	0	0	0
	MF	(England) ENG	Gordon Coleman	7	0	7	0	0	0	0	0
	DF	(England) ENG	Graham Hawkins	34	0	31 + 1	0	0	0	2	0
	MF	(Scotland) SCO	Jim McNab	25	0	23	0	0	0	2	0
	DF	(England) ENG	John Bird	29	2	28	2	0 + 1	0	0	0
	GK	(England) ENG	John Brown	31	0	30	0	1	0	0	0
	DF	(England) ENG	John McMahon	45	1	42	1	1	0	2	0
	FW	(England) ENG	John Smith	3	0	1 + 2	0	0	0	0	0
	FW	(Scotland) SCO	Mel Holden	26	4	21 + 2	4	1	0	2	0
	FW	(England) ENG	Mike Elwiss	11	5	11	5	0	0	0	0
	FW	(England) ENG	Neil Young	26	8	24 + 1	7	0	0	1	1
	MF	(England) ENG	Nobby Stiles	29	1	27	1	1	0	1	0
	FW	(Republic of Ireland) IRL	Ray Treacy	21	0	19 + 1	0	1	0	0	0
	DF	(Scotland) SCO	Stuart Baxter	30	1	24 + 3	1	1	0	2	0
	MF	(England) ENG	Tony Morley	13	0	7 + 3	0	1	0	2	0
Player(s) who featured whilst on loan but returned to parent club during the season:
	GK	(England) ENG	Ron Healey	6	0	6	0	0	0	0	0

== Awards and nominations ==
=== Club awards ===
Award	Player	Notes	Ref.
Player of the Year	(England) Francis Burns		
