= 1979–80 Preston North End F.C. season =

Preston North End's 1979–1980 season

Preston North End
1979–80 season
- Chairman: Alan R.W. Jones JP FRICS
- Manager: Nobby Stiles
- Stadium: Deepdale
- Second Division: 10th
- FA Cup: Third round
- League Cup: Second round
- Top goalscorer: League: Steve Elliott (16); All: Steve Elliott (16)
- Highest home attendance: 16,986 vs. Ipswich Town
- Lowest home attendance: 7,407 vs. Notts County
- Average home league attendance: 9,702

During the 1979–80 English football season, Preston North End F.C. competed in the Football League Second Division.

== Final league table ==
Pos	Team	Pld	W	D	L	GF	GA	GD	Pts
8	Cambridge United	42	14	16	12	61	53	+8	44
9	Newcastle United	42	15	14	13	53	49	+4	44
10	Preston North End	42	12	19	11	56	52	+4	43
11	Oldham Athletic	42	16	11	15	49	53	−4	43
12	Swansea City	42	17	9	16	48	53	−5	43

Rules for classification: 1) Points; 2) Goal difference; 3) Goals scored

== Results ==
Preston North End's score comes first

=== Legend ===
Win	Draw	Loss

=== Football League Second Division ===
Date	Opponent	Venue	Result	Attendance	Scorers
18 August 1979	Charlton Athletic	A	3-0	6,148	Elliott, Bell, Thomson
21 August 1979	Newcastle United	H	1-0	12,707	Potts
25 August 1979	Swansea City	H	1-1	12,116	Bartley (og)
01 September 1979	Fulham	A	0-1	7,922	
08 September 1979	West Ham United	H	1-1	10,460	Coleman
15 September 1979	Oldham Athletic	A	2-3	9,849	Thomson 2
22 September 1979	Bristol Rovers	H	3-2	7,555	Bruce 2, Elliott
29 September 1979	Sunderland	A	1-1	24,599	Elliott
06 October 1979	Birmingham City	H	0-0	10,740	
10 October 1979	Newcastle United	A	0-0	24,985	
13 October 1979	Queens Park Rangers	A	1-1	14,316	Thomson
20 October 1979	Burnley	H	3-2	12,300	Bruce, Thomson 2
27 October 1979	Luton Town	A	1-1	11,648	Elliott
03 November 1979	Charlton Athletic	H	1-1	9,950	Elliott
10 November 1979	Notts County	A	1-2	8,602	Bruce
17 November 1979	Leicester City	H	1-1	9,739	Bruce
24 November 1979	Orient	H	2-2	7,835	Bruce, Elliott
01 December 1979	Chelsea	A	0-2	21,192	
08 December 1979	Cambridge United	H	2-2	7,585	Bruce, Elliott
15 December 1979	Cardiff City	A	2-0	6,419	Bruce 2
21 December 1979	Watford	H	1-2	8,956	Elliott (pen)
26 December 1979	Shrewsbury Town	H	3-0	8,875	Elliott, Bruce, Bell
29 December 1979	Swansea City	A	0-1	11,401	
01 January 1980	Wrexham	A	0-2	14,738	
12 January 1980	Fulham	H	3-2	7,912	Elliott 2 (1 pen), McGee
19 January 1980	West Ham United	A	0-2	17,603	
02 February 1980	Oldham Athletic	H	0-1	8,932	
16 February 1980	Sunderland	H	2-1	12,165	Hindmarch (og), Coleman
23 February 1980	Queens Park Rangers	H	0-3	10,350	
01 March 1980	Burnley	A	1-1	10,843	McGee
08 March 1980	Luton Town	H	1-1	7,862	McGee
11 March 1980	Bristol Rovers	A	3-3	6,022	Baxter, McGee, Aitken (og)
15 March 1980	Birmingham City	A	2-2	19,548	Elliott, McGee
22 March 1980	Notts County	H	2-0	7,407	McGee, Taylor
29 March 1980	Leicester City	A	2-1	15,293	Elwiss 2
01 April 1980	Shrewsbury Town	A	3-1	8,602	Keay (og), Elliott 2
05 April 1980	Wrexham	H	0-0	9,739	
09 April 1980	Watford	A	0-0	11,967	
12 April 1980	Chelsea	H	1-1	13,069	Baxter
19 April 1980	Orient	A	2-2	4,509	McGee, Elliott
26 April 1980	Cardiff City	H	2-0	7,481	McGee, Coleman
03 May 1980	Cambridge United	A	2-3	5,395	Elliott, Elwiss

=== FA Cup ===
Round	Date	Opponent	Venue	Result	Attendance	Goalscorers
r3	05 January 1980	Ipswich Town	H	0-3	16,986	

=== League Cup ===
Round	Date	Opponent	Venue	Result	Attendance	Goalscorers
r2-1	28 August 1979	Birmingham City	A	1-2 (aet)	13,887	Potts
r2-2	04 September 1979	Birmingham City	H	0-1	11,043	

=== Anglo-Scottish Cup ===
Round	Date	Opponent	Venue	Result	Attendance	Goalscorers
prg1	04 August 1979	Blackpool	H	3-1		
prg1	07 August 1979	Blackburn Rovers	A	1-1		
prg1	11 August 1979	Burnley	A	2-1		
qf-1	18 September 1979	Morton	H	1-3		
qf-2	22 October 1979	Morton	A	0-2		

== Statistics ==
=== Appearances and goals ===
No.	Pos	Nat	Player	Total		Division Two		FA Cup		EFL Cup	
No.	Pos	Nat	Player	Apps	Goals	Apps	Goals	Apps	Goals	Apps	Goals
	FW	(Scotland) SCO	Alex Bruce	29	10	22 + 4	10	1	0	1 + 1	0
	DF	(England) ENG	Andy McAteer	22	0	21	0	1	0	0	0
	DF	(England) ENG	Brian Taylor	38	1	34 + 1	1	1	0	2	0
	DF	(Scotland) SCO	Danny Cameron	17	0	17	0	0	0	0	0
	DF	(Republic of Ireland) IRL	Don O'Riordan	20	0	16 + 2	0	1	0	1	0
	MF	(England) ENG	Eric Potts	27	2	22 + 3	1	0	0	2	1
	DF	(Scotland) SCO	Francis Burns	28	0	27	0	0	0	0 + 1	0
	MF	(England) ENG	Gordon Coleman	32	3	24 + 6	3	0	0	2	0
	MF	(England) ENG	Graham Bell	38	2	35 + 1	2	1	0	1	0
	MF	(Gibraltar) GIB	Graham Houston	1	0	0 + 1	0	0	0	0	0
	DF	(England) ENG	Harry Wilson	14	0	12	0	0	0	2	0
	DF	(Republic of Ireland) IRL	John Anderson	5	0	5	0	0	0	0	0
	DF	(Scotland) SCO	John Blackley	28	0	27	0	0	0	1	0
	DF	(England) ENG	Mick Baxter	40	2	37	2	1	0	2	0
	FW	(Republic of Ireland) IRL	Paul McGee	23	8	20 + 2	8	1	0	0	0
	FW	(England) ENG	Richard Thomson	13	6	11 + 1	6	0	0	1	0
	GK	(England) ENG	Roy Tunks	45	0	42	0	1	0	2	0
	MF	(England) ENG	Sean Haslegrave	27	0	24 + 1	0	1	0	1	0
	MF	(Wales) WAL	Steve Doyle	17	1	14	1	1	0	2	0
	FW	(England) ENG	Steve Elliott	45	16	42	16	1	0	2	0
	MF	(Scotland) SCO	Willie Naughton	3	0	2 + 1	0	0	0	0	0
Player(s) who featured whilst on loan but returned to parent club during the season:
	FW	(England) ENG	Mike Elwiss	10	3	8 + 2	3	0	0	0	0

== Awards and Nominations ==
=== Club Awards ===
Award	Player	Notes	Ref.
Player of the Year	(England) Roy Tunks		
