= 1980–81 Preston North End F.C. season =

Preston North End's 1980–1981 season

Preston North End
1980–81 season
- Chairman: Alan R.W. Jones JP FRICS
- Manager: Nobby Stiles (until 5th June)
- Stadium: Deepdale
- Second Division: 20th
- FA Cup: Third round
- League Cup: Third round
- Top goalscorer: League: Alex Bruce (13); All: Alex Bruce (15)
- Highest home attendance: 18,970 vs. Swansea City
- Lowest home attendance: 4,748 vs. Wrexham
- Average home league attendance: 7,607

During the 1980–81 English football season, Preston North End F.C. competed in the Football League Second Division.

== Final league table ==
Pos	Team	Pld	W	D	L	GF	GA	GD	Pts	Qualification or relegation
18	Bolton Wanderers	42	14	10	18	61	66	−5	38	
19	Cardiff City	42	12	12	18	44	60	−16	36	
20	Preston North End (R)	42	11	14	17	41	62	−21	36	Relegation to the Third Division
21	Bristol City (R)	42	7	16	19	29	51	−22	30	Relegation to the Third Division
22	Bristol Rovers (R)	42	5	13	24	34	65	−31	23	Relegation to the Third Division

Rules for classification: 1) Points; 2) Goal difference; 3) Goals scored
(R) Relegated

== Results ==
Preston North End's score comes first

=== Legend ===
Win	Draw	Loss

=== Football League Second Division ===
Date	Opponent	Venue	Result	Attendance	Scorers
16 August 1980	Bristol City	H	1-1	6,058	Elliott
19 August 1980	Grimsby Town	A	0-0	10,461	
23 August 1980	West Ham United	H	0-0	9,063	
30 August 1980	Sheffield Wednesday	A	0-3	16,724	
6 September 1980	Cambridge United	H	2-0	5,516	McGee 2
13 September 1980	Watford	A	1-2	11,275	Coleman
20 September 1980	Chelsea	A	1-1	13,755	Elliott
27 September 1980	Shrewsbury Town	H	0-0	6,309	
4 October 1980	Leyton Orient	A	0-4	4,295	
7 October 1980	Newcastle United	H	2-3	5,301	Coleman, Bruce
11 October 1980	Luton Town	H	1-0	5,620	Elliott
18 October 1980	Wrexham	A	1-0	5,775	Bruce
21 October 1980	Bolton Wanderers	A	1-2	10,713	Bruce
25 October 1980	Bristol City	H	0-0	5,807	
1 November 1980	Oldham Athletic	A	1-1	6,739	Bruce
8 November 1980	Cardiff City	H	3-1	5,458	Baxter, Bruce, Stevens (og)
15 November 1980	Bristol City	A	0-0	8,042	
22 November 1980	Queens Park Rangers	H	3-2	6,725	Naughton 2, Baxter
28 November 1980	Swansea City	A	0-3	9,115	
2 December 1980	Grimsby Town	H	2-4	5,289	Elliott, Baxter
6 December 1980	Derby County	H	0-3	6,118	
13 December 1980	Luton Town	A	2-4	7,874	Elliott, Bruce
20 December 1980	Wrexham	H	1-1	4,746	Elliott
26 December 1980	Blackburn Rovers	A	0-0	17,726	
27 December 1980	Notts County	H	2-2	6,547	Baxter, Elliott
10 January 1981	Queens Park Rangers	A	1-1	8,415	Bell
31 January 1981	West Ham United	A	0-5	26,413	
7 February 1981	Watford	H	2-1	5,107	McGee, Coleman
14 February 1981	Cambridge United	A	0-1	4,228	
21 February 1981	Shrewsbury Town	A	0-3	4,660	
28 February 1981	Chelsea	H	1-0	8,129	Bruce
7 March 1981	Leyton Orient	H	3-0	5,448	Taylor (og), Doyle, McGee
14 March 1981	Newcastle United	A	0-2	11,946	
24 March 1981	Bolton Wanderers	H	1-2	8,505	Bruce
28 March 1981	Bristol Rovers	A	0-2	4,427	
4 April 1981	Oldham Athletic	H	1-2	6,154	Bruce
11 April 1981	Cardiff City	A	3-1	4,991	Haslegrave, Bruce, Elliott
14 April 1981	Sheffield Wednesday	H	2-1	9,537	Elliott, Houston
18 April 1981	Notts County	A	0-0	8,485	
21 April 1981	Blackburn Rovers	H	0-0	18,742	
2 May 1981	Swansea City	H	1-3	18,970	Bruce
6 May 1981	Derby County	A	2-1	15,050	Bruce 2

=== FA Cup ===
Round	Date	Opponent	Venue	Result	Attendance	Goalscorers
R3	3 January 1981	Bristol Rovers	H	3-4	6,352	Bruce, Houston, McGee

=== League Cup ===
Round	Date	Opponent	Venue	Result	Attendance	Goalscorers
R1 - 1L	26 August 1980	Wigan Athletic	H	1-0	8,108	McGee
R1 - 2L	3 September 1980	Wigan Athletic	A	2-1	9,698	Coleman, McGee
R2	23 September 1980	Oxford United	H	1-0	5,722	Coleman
R3	29 October 1980	West Bromwich Albion	A	0-0	17,579	
R3 - Replay	4 November 1980	West Bromwich Albion	H	1-1 (AET)	14,420	Bell
R3 - 2nd Replay	12 November 1980	West Bromwich Albion	A	1-2 (AET)	15,218	Bruce

=== Anglo-Scottish Cup ===
Round	Date	Opponent	Venue	Result	Attendance	Goalscorers
prg1	30 July 1980	Carlisle United	H	0–0		
prg1	2 August 1980	Blackburn Rovers	H	0–1		
prg1	5 August 1980	Blackpool	H	0–1		

== Statistics ==
=== Appearances and goals ===
No.	Pos	Nat	Player	Total		Division Two		FA Cup		EFL Cup	
No.	Pos	Nat	Player	Apps	Goals	Apps	Goals	Apps	Goals	Apps	Goals
	FW	(Scotland) SCO	Alex Bruce	36	15	29 + 2	13	1	1	4	1
	DF	(England) ENG	Andy McAteer	26	0	20	0	1	0	5	0
	DF	(England) ENG	Brian Taylor	25	0	20 + 2	0	1	0	0 + 2	0
	DF	(Scotland) SCO	Danny Cameron	13	0	13	0	0	0	0	0
	DF	(Republic of Ireland) IRL	Don O'Riordan	25	0	19 + 2	0	1	0	3	0
	MF	(England) ENG	Eric Potts	3	0	3	0	0	0	0	0
	DF	(Scotland) SCO	Francis Burns	35	0	29	0	1	0	5	0
	MF	(England) ENG	Gordon Coleman	43	5	36	3	1	0	6	2
	MF	(England) ENG	Graham Bell	41	2	34 + 1	1	0	0	5 + 1	1
	MF	(Gibraltar) GIB	Graham Houston	21	2	17	1	1	1	3	0
	DF	(Republic of Ireland) IRL	John Anderson	11	0	7 + 1	0	0	0	3	0
	DF	(Scotland) SCO	John Blackley	26	0	21 + 2	0	0	0	3	0
	DF	(England) ENG	Mick Baxter	49	4	42	4	1	0	6	0
	FW	(Republic of Ireland) IRL	Paul McGee	41	7	32 + 2	4	0 + 1	1	6	2
	GK	(England) ENG	Peter Litchfield	3	0	3	0	0	0	0	0
	MF	(Wales) WAL	Peter Sayer	9	0	5 + 3	0	0	0	0 + 1	0
	GK	(England) ENG	Roy Tunks	46	0	39	0	1	0	6	0
	MF	(England) ENG	Sean Haslegrave	9	1	8 + 1	1	0	0	0	0
	DF	(England) ENG	Simon Westwell	24	0	20	0	0	0	4	0
	MF	(Wales) WAL	Steve Doyle	31	1	24 + 3	1	1	0	2 + 1	0
	FW	(England) ENG	Steve Elliott	41	9	32 + 3	9	1	0	4 + 1	0
	MF	(Scotland) SCO	Willie Naughton	11	2	9 + 1	2	0	0	1	0

== Awards and Nominations ==
=== Club Awards ===
Award	Player	Notes	Ref.
Player of the Year	(England) Mick Baxter		
