= 1978–79 Preston North End F.C. season =

Preston North End's 1978–1979 season

Preston North End
1978–79 season
- Chairman: Alan R.W. Jones JP FRICS
- Manager: Nobby Stiles
- Stadium: Deepdale
- Second Division: 7th
- FA Cup: Fourth round
- League Cup: Second round
- Top goalscorer: League: Alex Bruce (21); All: Alex Bruce (26)
- Highest home attendance: 20,727 vs. Southampton
- Lowest home attendance: 6,841 vs. Huddersfield Town
- Average home league attendance: 12,114

During the 1978–79 English football season, Preston North End F.C. competed in the Football League Second Division.

== Final league table ==
| Pos | Team | Pld | W | D | L | GF | GA | GD | Pts |
|---|---|---|---|---|---|---|---|---|---|
| 5 | West Ham United | 42 | 18 | 14 | 10 | 70 | 39 | +31 | 50 |
| 6 | Notts County | 42 | 14 | 16 | 12 | 48 | 60 | −12 | 44 |
| 7 | Preston North End | 42 | 12 | 18 | 12 | 59 | 57 | +2 | 42 |
| 8 | Newcastle United | 42 | 17 | 8 | 17 | 51 | 55 | −4 | 42 |
| 9 | Cardiff City | 42 | 16 | 10 | 16 | 56 | 70 | −14 | 42 |

Rules for classification: 1) Points; 2) Goal difference; 3) Goals scored

== Results ==
Preston North End's score comes first

=== Legend ===
| Win | Draw | Loss |

=== Football League Second Division ===
| Date | Opponent | Venue | Result | Attendance | Scorers |
|---|---|---|---|---|---|
| 19 August 1978 | Cardiff City | A | 2-2 | 7,812 | Bruce 2 |
| 22 August 1978 | Blackburn Rovers | H | 4-1 | 15,412 | Michael Robinson, Doyle, Bruce 2 |
| 26 August 1978 | Sheffield United | H | 2-2 | 13,208 | Robinson 2 |
| 02 September 1978 | Sunderland | A | 1-3 | 16,819 | Robinson |
| 09 September 1978 | Millwall | H | 0-0 | 8,926 | |
| 16 September 1978 | Oldham Athletic | A | 0-2 | 8,766 | |
| 23 September 1978 | Stoke City | H | 0-1 | 14,600 | |
| 30 September 1978 | Brighton & Hove Albion | A | 1-5 | 19,217 | Cochrane |
| 07 October 1978 | Cambridge United | A | 0-1 | 5,398 | |
| 14 October 1978 | Crystal Palace | H | 2-3 | 10,795 | Haslegrave, Thomson |
| 21 October 1978 | Fulham | A | 3-5 | 8,719 | Bruce, Baxter, Coleman |
| 28 October 1978 | Burnley | H | 2-2 | 15,014 | Thomson, Bruce |
| 04 November 1978 | West Ham United | A | 1-3 | 23,579 | Thomson |
| 11 November 1978 | Cardiff City | H | 2-1 | 9,268 | Robinson 2 |
| 18 November 1978 | Sheffield United | A | 1-0 | 14,807 | Bruce |
| 21 November 1978 | Sunderland | H | 3-1 | 13,204 | Thomson, Robinson, Bruce |
| 25 November 1978 | Orient | A | 0-2 | 4,702 | |
| 09 December 1978 | Luton Town | A | 2-1 | 7,036 | Robinson (pen) |
| 12 December 1978 | Charlton Athletic | H | 6-1 | 10,385 | Coleman, Potts 2, Bruce 2, Robinson |
| 16 December 1978 | Notts County | H | 1-1 | 10,728 | Baxter |
| 23 December 1978 | Leicester City | A | 1-1 | 10,481 | Bruce |
| 26 December 1978 | Wrexham | H | 2-1 | 17,820 | Bruce, Jones (og) |
| 30 December 1978 | Bristol Rovers | H | 1-1 | 12,660 | Bruce |
| 10 February 1979 | Brighton & Hove Albion | H | 1-0 | 11,649 | Bruce |
| 24 February 1979 | Crystal Palace | A | 0-0 | 17,592 | |
| 28 February 1979 | Stoke City | A | 1-1 | 18,177 | Bruce |
| 03 March 1979 | Fulham | H | 2-2 | 10,890 | Bruce, Potts |
| 10 March 1979 | Burnley | A | 1-1 | 15,175 | Bruce |
| 17 March 1979 | West Ham United | H | 0-0 | 15,376 | |
| 20 March 1979 | Oldham Athletic | H | 1-1 | 12,535 | Coleman |
| 24 March 1979 | Blackburn Rovers | A | 1-0 | 17,790 | Bruce |
| 31 March 1979 | Orient | H | 1-1 | 9,494 | Coleman |
| 04 April 1979 | Newcastle United | A | 3-4 | 12,157 | Robinson 2, Bruce |
| 07 April 1979 | Charlton Athletic | A | 1-1 | 5,836 | Coleman |
| 14 April 1979 | Wrexham | A | 1-2 | 13,419 | Robinson |
| 16 April 1979 | Newcastle United | H | 0-0 | 12,966 | |
| 17 April 1979 | Leicester City | H | 4-0 | 10,394 | Robinson, Bruce 2, Coleman |
| 21 April 1979 | Notts County | A | 0-0 | 7,009 | |
| 24 April 1979 | Cambridge United | H | 0-2 | 10,136 | |
| 28 April 1979 | Luton Town | H | 2-2 | 8,927 | Doyle, Coleman |
| 05 May 1979 | Bristol Rovers | A | 1-0 | 5,814 | Baxter |
| 22 May 1979 | Millwall | A | 2-0 | 2,833 | Bell, Potts |

=== FA Cup ===
| Round | Date | Opponent | Venue | Result | Attendance | Goalscorers |
|---|---|---|---|---|---|---|
| r3 | 16 January 1979 | Derby County | H | 3-0 | 19,901 | Burns, Bruce (2) |
| r4 | 12 February 1979 | Southampton | H | 0-1 | 20,727 | |

=== League Cup ===
| Round | Date | Opponent | Venue | Result | Attendance | Goalscorers |
|---|---|---|---|---|---|---|
| r1-1 | 12 August 1978 | Huddersfield Town | H | 3-0 | 6,841 | Baxter, Bruce (2) |
| r1-2 | 15 August 1978 | Huddersfield Town | A | 2-2 | 3,435 | Thomson, Bruce |
| r2 | 29 August 1978 | Queens Park Rangers | H | 1-3 | 14,913 | Robinson |

=== Anglo-Scottish Cup ===
| Round | Date | Opponent | Venue | Result | Attendance | Goalscorers |
|---|---|---|---|---|---|---|
| prg1 | 2 August 1978 | Blackpool | H | 4–2 | | |
| prg1 | 5 August 1978 | Burnley | A | 2–3 | | |
| prg1 | 9 August 1978 | Blackburn Rovers | A | 0-1 | | |

== Statistics ==
=== Appearances and goals ===
| No. | Pos | Nat | Player | Total | | Division Two | | FA Cup | | EFL Cup | |
| No. | Pos | Nat | Player | Apps | Goals | Apps | Goals | Apps | Goals | Apps | Goals |
|---|---|---|---|---|---|---|---|---|---|---|---|
| | MF | (England) ENG | Alan Spavin | 3 | 0 | 2 | 0 | 0 | 0 | 1 | 0 |
| | FW | (Scotland) SCO | Alex Bruce | 45 | 26 | 40 | 21 | 2 | 2 | 2 + 1 | 3 |
| | DF | (England) ENG | Brian Taylor | 32 | 0 | 29 + 1 | 0 | 2 | 0 | 0 | 0 |
| | DF | (Scotland) SCO | Danny Cameron | 40 | 0 | 36 | 0 | 2 | 0 | 2 | 0 |
| | DF | (Republic of Ireland) IRL | Don O'Riordan | 34 | 0 | 32 | 0 | 2 | 0 | 0 | 0 |
| | MF | (England) ENG | Eric Potts | 32 | 5 | 25 + 4 | 5 | 2 | 0 | 0 + 1 | 0 |
| | DF | (Scotland) SCO | Francis Burns | 24 | 1 | 21 | 0 | 2 | 1 | 1 | 0 |
| | MF | (England) ENG | Gordon Coleman | 40 | 7 | 37 | 7 | 2 | 0 | 1 | 0 |
| | MF | (England) ENG | Graham Bell | 10 | 1 | 10 | 1 | 0 | 0 | 0 | 0 |
| | DF | (England) ENG | Graham Cross | 8 | 0 | 5 | 0 | 0 | 0 | 3 | 0 |
| | DF | (England) ENG | Harry Wilson | 13 | 0 | 8 + 4 | 0 | 0 | 0 | 1 | 0 |
| | FW | (Scotland) SCO | Ian Cochrane | 5 | 1 | 2 + 2 | 1 | 0 | 0 | 1 | 0 |
| | GK | (England) ENG | John Kilner | 1 | 0 | 0 | 0 | 0 | 0 | 1 | 0 |
| | DF | (England) ENG | John McMahon | 10 | 0 | 8 | 0 | 0 | 0 | 2 | 0 |
| | FW | (England) ENG | John Smith | 5 | 0 | 1 + 3 | 0 | 0 | 0 | 1 | 0 |
| | FW | (England) ENG | Michael Robinson | 41 | 14 | 36 | 13 | 2 | 0 | 3 | 1 |
| | DF | (England) ENG | Mick Baxter | 42 | 5 | 37 | 4 | 2 | 0 | 3 | 1 |
| | FW | (England) ENG | Richard Thomson | 20 | 5 | 13 + 4 | 4 | 0 | 0 | 3 | 1 |
| | GK | (England) ENG | Roy Tunks | 46 | 0 | 42 | 0 | 2 | 0 | 2 | 0 |
| | MF | (England) ENG | Sean Haslegrave | 46 | 1 | 41 | 1 | 2 | 0 | 3 | 0 |
| | MF | (Wales) WAL | Steve Doyle | 33 | 2 | 25 + 4 | 2 | 0 + 1 | 0 | 3 | 0 |
| | FW | (England) ENG | Steve Elliott | 7 | 0 | 5 + 2 | 0 | 0 | 0 | 0 | 0 |
| | DF | (England) ENG | Steve Uzelac | 7 | 0 | 7 | 0 | 0 | 0 | 0 | 0 |

== Awards and Nominations ==
=== Club Awards ===
| Award | Player | Notes | Ref. |
|---|---|---|---|
| Player of the Year | (England) Michael Robinson | | |
