= Preston North End F.C. Player of the Year =

Preston North End Player of the Season
- Sport: Association football
- Awarded for: being the best performing Preston North End player over the course of a season
- Presented by: Preston North End F.C.

History
- First award: 1968; 58 years ago
- Editions: 58 (as of 2026)
- First winner: (Republic of Ireland) Alan Kelly Sr.
- Most recent: (Denmark) Daniel Iversen (2025–26)

The Preston North End Player of the Season award is an official award given by Preston North End Football Club to the best performing player from the club over the course of the season. The award is given based on votes by supporters of Preston North End via the club's website. The inaugural award was handed to Alan Kelly Sr. in 1968 and it has been presented every season since. Daniel Iversen is the most recent winner of the award, following the 2025–26 season.

The Preston North End Player's Player of the Year award is also an annual award provided by the club. The distinction to the Player of the Year award is that the Players Player of the Year is voted on exclusively by the players at the club.

The Young Player of the Year award is voted on by the supporters of Preston North End, but it can only be for players under a specific age. As of 2025, players aged 23 or below are the only ones eligible for the award.

The Goal of the Season award is also voted on by supporters, however it is from a shortlist provided by the club.

== Award recipients ==
=== Player of the Year ===
Recipients of the Preston North End F.C. Player of the Year
Season	Division	Name	Position (Note: For a full description of positions see Football Positions.)	Nationality	Notes
1967-68	Division Two	Alan Kelly Sr.	Goalkeeper	Ireland	
1968-69	Division Two	Jim McNab	Midfielder	Scotland	
1969-70	Division Two	Bill Cranston	Defender	Scotland	
1970-71	Division Three	Alan Spavin	Midfielder	England	
1971-72	Division Two	John McMahon	Defender	England	
1972–73	Division Two	Jim McNab	Midfielder	Scotland	
1973–74	Division Two	Francis Burns	Defender	Scotland	
1974–75	Division Three	Mike Elwiss	Forward	England	
1975–76	Division Three	Gary Williams	Defender	England	
1976–77	Division Three	Mark Lawrenson	Defender	Ireland	
1977-78	Division Three	Mike Elwiss	Forward	England	
1978-79	Division Two	Mike Robinson	Forward	England	
1979–80	Division Two	Roy Tunks	Goalkeeper	England	
1980-81	Division Two	Mick Baxter	Defender	England	
1981-82	Division Three	Don O'Riordan	Midfielder	Ireland	
1982-83	Division Three	Steve Elliott	Forward	England	
1983-84	Division Three	Peter Litchfield	Goalkeeper	England	
1984-85	Division Three	Jonathan Clark	Midfielder	Wales	
1985-86	Division Four	John Thomas	Forward	England	
1986-87	Division Four	Gary Brazil	Forward	England	
1987-88	Division Three	Bob Atkins	Defender	England	
1988-89	Division Three	Brian Mooney	Midfielder	Ireland	
1989-90	Division Three	Warren Joyce	Midfielder	England	
1990-91	Division Three	Jeff Wrightson	Defender	England	
1991–92	Division Three	Lee Cartwright	Midfielder	England	
1992–93	Division Two	Tony Ellis	Forward	England	
1993–94	Division Three	Tony Ellis	Forward	England	
1994–95	Division Three	Andy Fensome	Defender	England	
1995–96	Division Three	Andy Saville	Forward	England	
1996–97	Division Two	Sean Gregan	Midfielder	England	
1997–98	Division Two	Teuvo Moilanen	Goalkeeper	Finland	
1998–99	Division Two	Michael Jackson	Defender	England	
1999–2000	Division Two	Sean Gregan	Midfielder	England	
2000–01	Division One	Jonathan Macken	Forward	Ireland	
2001–02	Division One	Richard Cresswell	Forward	England	
2002–03	Division One	Chris Lucketti	Defender	England	
2003–04	Division One	David Healy	Forward	Northern Ireland	
2004–05	Championship	Youl Mawene	Defender	France	
2005–06	Championship	Claude Davis	Defender	Jamaica	
2006-07	Championship	Matt Hill	Defender	England	
2007–08	Championship	Sean St Ledger	Defender	Ireland	
2008–09	Championship	Jon Parkin	Forward	England	
2009–10	Championship	Andrew Lonergan	Goalkeeper	England	
2010–11	Championship	Billy Jones	Defender	England	
2011–12	League One	Thorsten Stuckmann	Goalkeeper	Germany	
2012–13	League One	John Welsh	Midfielder	England	
2013–14	League One	Joe Garner	Forward	England	
2014–15	League One	Paul Huntington	Defender	England	
2015–16	Championship	Greg Cunningham	Defender	Ireland	
2016-17	Championship	Aiden McGeady	Midfielder	Ireland	
2017–18	Championship	Alan Browne	Midfielder	Ireland	
2018–19	Championship	Ben Davies	Defender	England	
2019–20	Championship	Daniel Johnson	Midfielder	Jamaica	
2020–21	Championship	Ryan Ledson	Midfielder	England	
2021–22	Championship	Daniel Iversen	Goalkeeper	Denmark	
2022–23	Championship	Freddie Woodman	Goalkeeper	England	
2023–24	Championship	Alan Browne	Midfielder	Ireland	
2024–25	Championship	Kaine Kesler-Hayden	Defender	England	
2025–26	Championship	Daniel Iversen	Goalkeeper	Denmark	

=== Player's Player of the Year ===
Recipients of the Preston North End F.C. Player's Player of the Year
Season	Name	Position (Note: For a full description of positions see Football Positions.)	Nationality	Notes
2012–13	John Welsh	Midfielder	England	
2013–14	Joe Garner	Forward	England	
2014–15	Paul Gallagher	Midfielder	Scotland	
2015–16	Greg Cunningham	Defender	Ireland	
2016–17	Tom Clarke	Defender	England	
2017–18	Alan Browne	Midfielder	Ireland	
2018–19	Ben Davies	Defender	England	
2019–20	Daniel Johnson	Midfielder	Jamaica	
2020–21	Ryan Ledson	Midfielder	England	
2021–22	Daniel Iversen	Goalkeeper	Denmark	
2022–23	Ched Evans	Forward	Wales	
2023–24	Liam Lindsay	Defender	Scotland	
2024–25	Kaine Kesler-Hayden	Defender	England	
2025–26	Daniel Iversen	Goalkeeper	Denmark	

=== Young Player of the Year ===
Recipients of the Preston North End F.C. Young Player of the Year
Season	Name	Position (Note: For a full description of positions see Football Positions.)	Nationality	Notes
2012–13	Bailey Wright	Defender	Australia	
2013–14	Josh Brownhill	Midfielder	England	
2015–16	Alan Browne	Midfielder	Ireland	
2016–17	Ben Pearson	Midfielder	England	
2017–18	Ben Davies	Defender	England	
2018–19	Jordan Storey	Defender	England	
2019–20	N/A	N/A	N/A	(Note: No Young Player of the Year award has been recorded for this season.)
2020–21	N/A	N/A	N/A	(Note: No Young Player of the Year award has been recorded for this season.)
2021–22	Sepp van den Berg	Defender	Netherlands	
2022–23	Álvaro Fernandez	Defender	Spain	
2023–24	Kian Best	Defender	England	
2024–25	Kaine Kesler-Hayden	Defender	England	
2025–26	Alfie Devine	Midfielder	England	

=== Scholar of the Year ===
Recipients of the Preston North End F.C. Scholar of the Year
Season	Name	Position (Note: For a full description of positions see Football Positions.)	Nationality	Notes
2012–13	Ben Davies	Defender	England	
2013–14	Josh Brownhill	Midfielder	England	
2015–16	Mathew Hudson	Goalkeeper	England	
2016–17	Callum Roberts	Goalkeeper	England	
2017–18	Adam O’Reilly	Midfielder	Ireland	
2018–19	Adam O’Reilly	Midfielder	Ireland	
2019–20	Ethan Walker	Midfielder	England	
2020–21	Jacob Holland-Wilkinson	Forward	England	
2021–22	Jacob Holland-Wilkinson	Forward	England	
2021–22	Mikey O’Neill	Forward	England	
2022–23	Noah Mawene	Midfielder	England	
2023–24	Max Wilson	Midfielder	England	
2024–25	Theo Carroll	Midfielder	England	
2025–26	Li-Bau Stowell	Goalkeeper	England	

=== Goal of the Season ===
Recipients of the Preston North End F.C. Goal of the Season
Season	Competition	Opposition	Ground	Date	Scorer	Score (Note: The score as a result of the goal that was scored.)	Result	Notes
2012–13	League One	Scunthorpe United	Deepdale	6th April 2013	Nicky Wroe	2-0	3-0	
2013–14	League One	Carlisle United	Brunton Park	26th December 2013	Josh Brownhill	0-1	0-1	
2014–15	League One	Rotherham United	Deepdale	9th May 2014	Joe Garner	1-1	1-1	
2015–16	Championship	Charlton Athletic	The Valley	20th October 2015	Paul Gallagher	0-2	0-3	
2016–17	Championship	Aston Villa	Villa Park	21st January 2017	Jordan Hugill	2-1	2-2	
2017–18	Championship	Cardiff City	Deepdale	12th September 2017	Alan Browne	3-0	3-0	
2018–19	Championship	Bolton Wanderers	Deepdale	1st September 2018	Alan Browne	2-0	2-2	
2019–20	Championship	Blackburn Rovers	Deepdale	26th October 2019	Tom Barkhuizen	3-2	3-2	
2020–21	Championship	AFC Bournemouth	Deepdale	1st December 2020	Scott Sinclair	0-2	2-3	
2021–22	Championship	Blackpool	Deepdale	5th April 2022	Cameron Archer	1-0	1-0	
2022–23	Championship	Luton Town	Kenilworth Road	13th August 2022	Brad Potts	0-1	0-1	
2023–24	Championship	Leeds United	Deepdale	26th December 2023	Liam Millar	2-1	2-1	
2024–25	FA Cup	Burnley	Deepdale	1st March 2025	Robbie Brady	1-0	3-0	
2025–26	Championship	Swansea City	Deepdale	5th November 2025	Thierry Small	1-0	2-1	
