= Adam Henderson =

Adam Henderson may refer to:

- Adam Henderson (footballer) (1873–after 1901), English footballer
- Adam Henderson (fl. 1989–1995), British musician and founding member of Inkubus Sukkubus
