= William Cranston =

William Cranston may refer to:

- William W. Cranston (1838–1907), American soldier in the American Civil War
- Bill Cranston (1942–2022), Scottish footballer
- Billy Cranston, a fictional character in the Power Rangers universe
