= Ian Cochrane =

Ian Cochrane may refer to:

- Ian Cochrane (novelist) (1941–2004), novelist and creative writing teacher from Northern Ireland
- Ian Cochrane (footballer) (born 1959), Scottish former footballer
