= Harry Wilson (footballer, born 1953) =

English footballer (born 1953)

Personal information
- Full name: Harry Wilson
- Date of birth: 29 November 1953 (age 72)
- Place of birth: Hetton-le-Hole, England
- Height: 5 ft 9 1/2 in (1.77 m)
- Position: Left back

Senior career*
Years	Team	Apps	(Gls)
1970–1973	Burnley	12	(0)
1973–1977	Brighton & Hove Albion	130	(4)
1977–1980	Preston North End	42	(0)
1980–1983	Darlington	85	(0)
1983–1984	Hartlepool United	16	(0)
1984–19??	Crook Town		

International career
1968–1969	England schoolboys	4	(0)
1970–1971	England youth	1	(0)

Managerial career
- 198?–1988: Seaham Red Star
- 1988–1989: Whitby Town
- * Club domestic league appearances and goals

Harry Wilson (born 29 November 1953) is an English former professional footballer who made nearly 300 appearances in the Football League in the 1970s and 1980s.

Primarily a left back, Wilson was a schoolboy international and played for the England youth team. He began his club career with Burnley and went on to play League football for Brighton & Hove Albion, Preston North End, Darlington and Hartlepool United. Wilson also had a spell in non-league football with Crook Town, and went on to work as a manager and coach.

== Life and career ==
Wilson was born in 1953 in Hetton-le-Hole, County Durham. He attended Murton County Primary School in Murton, now called Ribbon Academy, which named one of its houses in his honour. He played representative football for Durham Schools, and was capped four times for England schoolboys in the 1968–69 season. He began his club career as an apprentice with Burnley, and it was as a Burnley player that he played for the England youth team in 1970–71.

With Burnley's relegation from the First Division already confirmed, Wilson made his first-team debut on 26 April 1971, aged 17 years 5 months, playing at left back in a 1–0 win against Chelsea in the First Division. He kept his place for the last match of the season, and made ten Second Division appearances in 1971–72, as one of four players tried at left back, but the arrival of England international full back Keith Newton meant Wilson played no part in Burnley's 1972–73 Second Division-winning campaign. Shortly after his 20th birthday, after 18 months of second-eleven football, Wilson and fellow long-term reserve Ronnie Welch were signed by Brian Clough for Brighton & Hove Albion for £70,000 the pair. He said later that he "was happy at Burnley but if an offer comes in for you and they accept it there's not much you can do".

Wilson went straight into the starting eleven, and after two games, John Vinicombe of the Evening Argus was impressed: he "is looking something of a fire-eater. He has a rare zest for the game and relishes the close, physical contact that is synonymous with his position. He knows how to destroy and create, and does both in a manner befitting a five-year background at the academy of fine footballing arts." He kept his place for two-and-a-half seasons before being dislodged by Chris Cattlin, but still made 17 appearances for the 1976–77 Third Division promotion squad, taking his totals to 146 appearances in all competitions.

In the 1977 close season, Albion signed Mark Lawrenson and Gary Williams from Third Division club Preston North End, and supplied Wilson and Graham Cross in part exchange. Wilson played the first 23 matches of the 1977–78 season, all but one in the starting eleven, when a motor accident left him in hospital for several weeks. Suggestions that his career was over proved wrong, and he returned at the beginning of the 1978–79 season in the Second Division, to which Preston had been promoted in his absence. After eight league starts, he fell out of contention, and in the following season, he made twelve league starts, the last of which was on 21 December 1979.

He was transfer-listed in February 1980, and a month into the 1980–81 season, signed for Darlington. The club had had to apply for re-election the previous season, and targeted Wilson to fill a vacancy at left back and to add experience to a small and very young squad. He made 90 appearances over three years with the financially struggling club, the third of which was interrupted by injury, before finishing his Football League career with Darlington's local rivals Hartlepool United. It would be a further 18 years before another player – Neil Aspin – made the same move on a permanent basis.

Wilson moved into non-league football, first as a player with Crook Town of the Northern League and then as a manager, with Seaham Red Star and Whitby Town. He went on to act as Sunderland's community officer, coached at Burnley and Bury, and worked for the Football League monitoring clubs' youth systems.

== Career statistics ==
Appearances and goals by club, season and competition
Club	Season	League			FA Cup		League Cup		Other		Total	
Club	Season	Division	Apps	Goals	Apps	Goals	Apps	Goals	Apps	Goals	Apps	Goals
Burnley	1970–71	First Division	2	0	0	0	0	0	0	0	2	0
Burnley	1971–72	Second Division	10	0	0	0	0	0	—		0	0
Burnley	1972–73	Second Division	0	0	0	0	0	0	0	0	0	0
Burnley	1973–74	First Division	0	0	—		0	0	0	0	0	0
Burnley	Total		12	0	0	0	0	0	0	0	12	0
Brighton & Hove Albion	1973–74	Third Division	25	0	—		—		—		25	0
Brighton & Hove Albion	1974–75	Third Division	42	3	3	0	4	0	—		49	3
Brighton & Hove Albion	1975–76	Third Division	46	1	3	0	2	0	—		51	1
Brighton & Hove Albion	1976–77	Third Division	17	0	1	0	3	0	—		21	0
Brighton & Hove Albion	Total		130	4	7	0	9	0	—		146	4
Preston North End	1977–78	Third Division	18	0	0	0	5	0	—		23	0
Preston North End	1978–79	Second Division	12	0	0	0	1	0	3 (Note: Appearances in Anglo-Scottish Cup)	0	16	0
Preston North End	1979–80	Second Division	12	0	0	0	2	0	2	0	16	0
Preston North End	Total		42	0	0	0	8	0	5	0	55	0
Darlington	1980–81	Fourth Division	26	0	1	0	0	0	—		27	0
Darlington	1981–82	Fourth Division	29	0	1	0	0	0	—		30	0
Darlington	1982–83	Fourth Division	30	0	1	0	2	0	—		33	0
Darlington	Total		85	0	3	0	2	0	—		90	0
Hartlepool United	1983–84	Fourth Division	16	0	2	0	2	0	0	0	20	0
Career total			285	4	12	0	21	0	5	0	323	4

== Sources ==
- Simpson, Ray (2007). The Clarets Chronicles: The Definitive History of Burnley Football Club 1882–2007. Burnley F.C. ISBN 978-0-9557468-0-2.
