= Alan Lamb (footballer, born 1952) =

Scottish footballer

Personal information
- Full name: Alan David Lamb
- Date of birth: 3 July 1952 (age 74)
- Place of birth: Falkirk, Scotland
- Height: 5 ft 8 in (1.73 m)
- Position: Midfielder

Senior career*
| Years | Team | Apps | (Gls) |
| 1972–1977 | Preston North End | 80 | (2) |
| 1977–1978 | Port Vale | 54 | (3) |
| 1978–1979 | Dundee | 24 | (2) |
| 1979–1980 | St Johnstone | 14 | (1) |
| Total | | 172 | (8) |

International career
| 1974 | Scotland U23 | 1 | (0) |
- * Club domestic league appearances and goals

Alan David Lamb (born 3 July 1952) is a Scottish former footballer who played as a midfielder. He won one cap for Scotland under-23s in 1974.

He began his career at Preston North End in 1972 and played under Bobby Charlton. He moved to Port Vale for a £5,000 fee in March 1977, before joining Dundee on a free transfer in May 1978. He helped the club to the First Division title in 1978–79 and finished his career with St Johnstone.

== Career ==
Lamb began his career at Preston North End in 1972, who avoided relegation out of the Second Division by a single point in 1972–73 under Alan Ball's stewardship. Bobby Charlton was appointed manager in 1973. The "Lilywhites" failed to avoid the drop in 1973–74, however. They finished ninth in the Third Division in 1974–75, after which Harry Catterick took charge at Deepdale. Unsuccessful promotion campaigns followed in 1975–76 and 1976–77.

He was purchased by Port Vale manager Roy Sproson for a £5,000 fee in March 1977, as a replacement for the recently sold Colin Tartt. He was a regular in the side, featuring in 15 games towards the end of the 1976–77 season. He made 47 appearances in 1977–78, scoring three goals, as the "Valiants" suffered relegation into the Fourth Division under Bobby Smith. Lamb left Vale Park on a free transfer to Dundee in May 1978.

He made 24 appearances as Tommy Gemmell took the Dens Park club to the Premier Division as champions of the First Division in 1978–79. Lamb then moved on to Alex Stuart's St Johnstone and played 14 games in 1979–80 before leaving Muirton Park in the summer.

== Career statistics ==
Appearances and goals by club, season and competition
| Club | Season | League | | | FA Cup | | Other | | Total | |
| Club | Season | Division | Apps | Goals | Apps | Goals | Apps | Goals | Apps | Goals |
|---|---|---|---|---|---|---|---|---|---|---|
| Preston North End | 1971–72 | Second Division | 9 | 1 | 0 | 0 | 0 | 0 | 9 | 1 |
| Preston North End | 1972–73 | Second Division | 14 | 0 | 0 | 0 | 1 | 0 | 15 | 0 |
| Preston North End | 1973–74 | Second Division | 20 | 0 | 0 | 0 | 1 | 0 | 21 | 0 |
| Preston North End | 1974–75 | Third Division | 25 | 1 | 4 | 0 | 3 | 0 | 32 | 1 |
| Preston North End | 1975–76 | Third Division | 8 | 0 | 0 | 0 | 3 | 0 | 11 | 0 |
| Preston North End | 1976–77 | Third Division | 4 | 0 | 0 | 0 | 0 | 0 | 4 | 0 |
| Preston North End | Total | | 80 | 2 | 4 | 0 | 8 | 0 | 92 | 2 |
| Port Vale | 1976–77 | Third Division | 14 | 0 | 0 | 0 | 1 | 0 | 15 | 0 |
| Port Vale | 1977–78 | Third Division | 40 | 3 | 4 | 0 | 3 | 0 | 47 | 3 |
| Port Vale | Total | | 54 | 3 | 4 | 0 | 4 | 0 | 62 | 3 |

== Honours ==
Dundee

- Scottish Football League First Division: 1978–79
