= 1989–90 Preston North End F.C. season =

Preston North End's 1989–1990 season

Preston North End
1989–90 season
- Chairman: Keith W. Leeming
- Manager: John McGrath (until 14th February); Les Chapman (from 14th February)
- Stadium: Deepdale
- Third Division: 19th
- FA Cup: Second round
- League Cup: First round
- Football League Trophy: First Round
- Top goalscorer: League: Joyce (11); All: Joyce (13)
- Highest home attendance: 9,135 vs Bolton Wanderers
- Lowest home attendance: 4,480 vs Leyton Orient
- Average home league attendance: 6,312

During the 1989–90 English football season, Preston North End F.C. competed in the Football League Third Division.

== Final league table ==
| Pos | Team | Pld | W | D | L | GF | GA | GD | Pts | Promotion or relegation |
|---|---|---|---|---|---|---|---|---|---|---|
| 17 | Swansea City | 46 | 14 | 12 | 20 | 45 | 63 | −18 | 54 | |
| 18 | Wigan Athletic | 46 | 13 | 14 | 19 | 48 | 64 | −16 | 53 | |
| 19 | Preston North End | 46 | 14 | 10 | 22 | 65 | 79 | −14 | 52 | |
| 20 | Fulham | 46 | 12 | 15 | 19 | 55 | 66 | −11 | 51 | |
| 21 | Cardiff City (R) | 46 | 12 | 14 | 20 | 51 | 70 | −19 | 50 | Relegation to the Fourth Division |

(R) Relegated

== Results ==
Preston North End's score comes first

=== Legend ===
| Win | Draw | Loss |

=== Football League Third Division ===
| Date | Opponent | Venue | Result | Attendance | Scorers |
|---|---|---|---|---|---|
| 19 August 1989 | Rotherham United | A | 1-3 | 5,951 | Shaw |
| 26 August 1989 | Bury | H | 2-3 | 5,622 | Shaw, Harper |
| 02 September 1989 | Leyton Orient | A | 1-3 | 4,871 | Ellis |
| 09 September 1989 | Huddersfield Town | H | 3-3 | 5,822 | Bogie, Swann, Mooney |
| 16 September 1989 | Bristol Rovers | A | 0-3 | 4,350 | |
| 23 September 1989 | Chester City | H | 5-0 | 5,230 | Mooney 3, Harper 2 |
| 26 September 1989 | Blackpool | H | 2-1 | 8,920 | Bradshaw (og), Atkins |
| 30 September 1989 | Walsall | A | 0-1 | 4,045 | |
| 07 October 1989 | Northampton Town | A | 2-1 | 3,039 | Harper, Ellis |
| 14 October 1989 | Brentford | H | 4-2 | 5,956 | Ellis, Joyce, Harper, Swann |
| 17 October 1989 | Crewe Alexandra | H | 0-0 | 7,485 | |
| 21 October 1989 | Notts County | A | 1-2 | 5,284 | Williams |
| 28 October 1989 | Bolton Wanderers | H | 1-4 | 9,135 | Scully |
| 31 October 1989 | Mansfield Town | A | 2-2 | 3,129 | Mooney, Joyce |
| 04 November 1989 | Shrewsbury Town | H | 2-1 | 5,418 | Swann, Patterson |
| 11 November 1989 | Swansea City | A | 1-2 | 3,843 | Patterson |
| 25 November 1989 | Cardiff City | A | 0-3 | 3,270 | |
| 02 December 1989 | Reading | H | 1-0 | 5,067 | Swann |
| 16 December 1989 | Birmingham City | A | 1-3 | 6,391 | Patterson |
| 26 December 1989 | Tranmere Rovers | H | 2-2 | 8,300 | Swann 2 |
| 30 December 1989 | Wigan Athletic | H | 1-1 | 7,220 | Patterson |
| 01 January 1990 | Bristol City | A | 1-2 | 11,803 | Mooney |
| 06 January 1990 | Fulham | H | 1-0 | 5,055 | Shaw |
| 13 January 1990 | Bury | A | 2-1 | 4,715 | Joyce, Mooney |
| 20 January 1990 | Rotherham United | H | 0-1 | 6,088 | |
| 03 February 1990 | Chester City | A | 1-3 | 2,499 | Harper |
| 10 February 1990 | Bristol Rovers | H | 0-1 | 5,956 | |
| 13 February 1990 | Leyton Orient | H | 0-3 | 4,480 | |
| 17 February 1990 | Reading | A | 0-6 | 3,998 | |
| 24 February 1990 | Cardiff City | H | 4-0 | 5,716 | Harper 3, Joyce |
| 03 March 1990 | Fulham | A | 1-3 | 4,207 | Shaw |
| 06 March 1990 | Walsall | H | 2-0 | 5,210 | Swann, Thomas |
| 10 March 1990 | Blackpool | A | 2-2 | 8,108 | Shaw, Mooney |
| 17 March 1990 | Northampton Town | H | 0-0 | 5,681 | |
| 20 March 1990 | Brentford | A | 2-2 | 4,673 | Joyce, Williams |
| 24 March 1990 | Crewe Alexandra | A | 0-1 | 4,531 | |
| 31 March 1990 | Notts County | H | 2-4 | 5,810 | Joyce 2 |
| 03 April 1990 | Huddersfield Town | A | 2-0 | 4,381 | Joyce, Bogie |
| 07 April 1990 | Bolton Wanderers | A | 1-2 | 8,266 | Bogie |
| 10 April 1990 | Mansfield Town | H | 4-0 | 5,035 | Joyce 2, Foster (og), Hughes |
| 14 April 1990 | Bristol City | H | 2-2 | 7,599 | Flynn, Harper |
| 16 April 1990 | Tranmere Rovers | A | 1-2 | 10,187 | Joyce |
| 21 April 1990 | Birmingham City | H | 2-2 | 7,680 | Thomas, Mooney |
| 24 April 1990 | Wigan Athletic | A | 1-0 | 4,454 | Thomas |
| 28 April 1990 | Swansea City | H | 2-0 | 6,695 | Swann, Williams |
| 05 May 1990 | Shrewsbury Town | A | 0-2 | 5,319 | |

=== FA Cup ===
| Round | Date | Opponent | Venue | Result | Attendance | Goalscorers |
|---|---|---|---|---|---|---|
| r1 | 18 November 1989 | Tranmere Rovers | H | 1-0 | 7,521 | Joyce |
| r2 | 09 December 1989 | Whitley Bay | A | 0-2 | 4,500 | |

=== League Cup ===
| Round | Date | Opponent | Venue | Result | Attendance | Goalscorers |
|---|---|---|---|---|---|---|
| r1-1 | 22 August 1989 | Tranmere Rovers | H | 3-4 | 4,632 | Shaw (3) |
| r1-2 | 29 August 1989 | Tranmere Rovers | A | 1-3 | 5,275 | Shaw |

=== Football League Trophy ===
| Round | Date | Opponent | Venue | Result | Attendance | Goalscorers |
|---|---|---|---|---|---|---|
| n.prg5 | 07 November 1989 | Burnley | H | 3-0 | 5,241 | Joyce, Ellis (2) |
| n.prg5 | 13 December 1989 | Stockport County | A | 4-2 | 1,545 | Hughes, Ellis, Shaw (2) |
| n.r1 | 09 January 1990 | Wigan Athletic | H | 1-2 | 4,539 | Mooney |

== Statistics ==
=== Appearances and goals ===
| No. | Pos | Nat | Player | Total | | Division Three | | FA Cup | | EFL Cup | | EFL Trophy | |
| No. | Pos | Nat | Player | Apps | Goals | Apps | Goals | Apps | Goals | Apps | Goals | Apps | Goals |
|---|---|---|---|---|---|---|---|---|---|---|---|---|---|
| | DF | (England) ENG | Adrian Hughes | 41 | 2 | 29 + 6 | 1 | 2 | 0 | 1 | 0 | 3 | 1 |
| | GK | (Republic of Ireland) IRL | Alan Kelly Jr. | 47 | 0 | 42 | 0 | 2 | 0 | 0 | 0 | 3 | 0 |
| | GK | (England) ENG | Andy Gill | 1 | 0 | 0 | 0 | 0 | 0 | 1 | 0 | 0 | 0 |
| | DF | (England) ENG | Alexander Jones | 5 | 0 | 3 | 0 | 0 | 0 | 2 | 0 | 0 | 0 |
| | DF | (England) ENG | Bob Atkins | 33 | 1 | 27 + 1 | 1 | 2 | 0 | 2 | 0 | 1 | 0 |
| | MF | (Republic of Ireland) IRL | Brian Mooney | 50 | 11 | 44 + 1 | 10 | 2 | 0 | 2 | 0 | 1 | 1 |
| | DF | (England) ENG | David Miller | 5 | 0 | 3 | 0 | 0 | 0 | 2 | 0 | 0 | 0 |
| | MF | (England) ENG | Gary Swann | 53 | 8 | 46 | 8 | 2 | 0 | 2 | 0 | 3 | 0 |
| | FW | (England) ENG | Graham Shaw | 37 | 11 | 24 + 7 | 5 | 1 | 0 | 2 | 4 | 3 | 2 |
| | MF | (England) ENG | Ian Bogie | 42 | 3 | 30 + 5 | 3 | 2 | 0 | 1 + 1 | 0 | 3 | 0 |
| | DF | (England) ENG | Jeff Wrightson | 29 | 0 | 26 | 0 | 0 | 0 | 1 + 1 | 0 | 0 + 1 | 0 |
| | FW | (England) ENG | John Thomas | 11 | 3 | 11 | 3 | 0 | 0 | 0 | 0 | 0 | 0 |
| | MF | (England) ENG | Mark Patterson | 17 | 4 | 12 + 1 | 4 | 2 | 0 | 0 | 0 | 2 | 0 |
| | DF | (England) ENG | Michael Bennett | 12 | 0 | 10 | 0 | 0 | 0 | 0 | 0 | 2 | 0 |
| | DF | (England) ENG | Mick Rathbone | 12 | 0 | 3 + 5 | 0 | 0 | 0 | 1 + 1 | 0 | 0 + 2 | 0 |
| | DF | (England) ENG | Mike Flynn | 26 | 1 | 23 | 1 | 0 + 1 | 0 | 0 | 0 | 2 | 0 |
| | DF | (England) ENG | Neil Williams | 46 | 3 | 41 | 3 | 2 | 0 | 0 | 0 | 3 | 0 |
| | FW | (England) ENG | Nigel Greenwood | 5 | 0 | 5 | 0 | 0 | 0 | 0 | 0 | 0 | 0 |
| | GK | (England) ENG | Roy Tunks | 3 | 0 | 2 | 0 | 0 | 0 | 1 | 0 | 0 | 0 |
| | MF | (Northern Ireland) NIR | Sammy McIlroy | 20 | 0 | 20 | 0 | 0 | 0 | 0 | 0 | 0 | 0 |
| | FW | (England) ENG | Simon Snow | 2 | 0 | 1 | 0 | 0 | 0 | 1 | 0 | 0 | 0 |
| | MF | (England) ENG | Steve Harper | 41 | 10 | 28 + 8 | 10 | 1 + 1 | 0 | 1 | 0 | 2 | 0 |
| | MF | (England) ENG | Steven Anderton | 1 | 0 | 0 + 1 | 0 | 0 | 0 | 0 | 0 | 0 | 0 |
| | FW | (England) ENG | Tony Ellis | 21 | 6 | 17 | 3 | 2 | 0 | 0 | 0 | 2 | 3 |
| | MF | (England) ENG | Warren Joyce | 50 | 13 | 44 | 11 | 2 | 1 | 2 | 0 | 2 | 1 |
Player(s) who featured whilst on loan but returned to parent club during the season:
| | GK | (England) ENG | Mike Stowell | 2 | 0 | 2 | 0 | 0 | 0 | 0 | 0 | 0 | 0 |
| | DF | (Republic of Ireland) IRL | Patrick Scully | 14 | 1 | 13 | 1 | 0 | 0 | 0 | 0 | 1 | 0 |

== Awards and Nominations ==
=== Club Awards ===
| Award | Player | Notes | Ref. |
|---|---|---|---|
| Player of the Year | (England) Warren Joyce | | |
