= Sean Haslegrave =

English footballer (1951–2019)

Personal information
- Full name: Sean Matthew Haslegrave
- Date of birth: 7 June 1951
- Place of birth: Stoke-on-Trent, England
- Date of death: 22 November 2019 (aged 68)
- Height: 5 ft 8 in (1.73 m)
- Position: Midfielder

Youth career
- 1968–1970: Stoke City

Senior career*
Years	Team	Apps	(Gls)
1970–1976	Stoke City	113	(5)
1976–1977	Nottingham Forest	7	(1)
1977–1981	Preston North End	113	(2)
1981–1983	Crewe Alexandra	82	(1)
1983–1987	York City	142	(0)
1987–1989	Torquay United	36	(1)
Total		493	(10)
- * Club domestic league appearances and goals

Sean Matthew Haslegrave (7 June 1951 – 22 November 2019) was an English footballer who played in the Football League for Stoke City, Nottingham Forest, Preston North End, Crewe Alexandra, York City and Torquay United.

== Football career ==
Haslegrave was born in Stoke-on-Trent and began his career with local side Stoke City in 1968 signing on a professional contract in 1970. He made his debut against Derby County in December 1970 and went on to make 22 appearances in 1970–71. He played in 24 games in 1971–72 scoring twice but was restricted to six appearances in 1972–73 due to injury and on his return made 37 appearances in 1973–74. In 1974–75 he played in 24 matches, in a UEFA Cup match against Ajax Haslegrave was involved with a dispute with manager Tony Waddington which led to his move to Nottingham Forest. Brian Clough who was at the time out of work was invited by Waddington to watch Stoke play in Amsterdam. With Stoke struggling to break down the resolute Ajax defence Waddington substituted Haslegrave in favour of winger Terry Conroy. A furious Haslegrave exchanged words with Waddington and pushed him. Before Haslegrave could apologise Clough stepped in to say how much he enjoyed his altercation and once he was back in management he would sign him. He spent the 1975–76 season at the Victoria Ground making 29 appearances before he joined Clough at Nottingham Forest in July 1976 for a fee of £50,000.

However his move to Forest did not go according to plan as injury restricted his playing time and when Forest signed Scottish international Archie Gemmill in September 1977, Haslegrave was further down the pecking order. On 29 September 1977, Haslegrave left to join Preston North End, managed by England World Cup star Nobby Stiles for a fee of £25,000. At the end of the season Preston were promoted to the Second Division with Haslegrave a regular in midfield. After two successful seasons, Preston struggled in 1980–81 and were eventually relegated on the last day of the season. Stiles was sacked soon afterwards and Haslegrave was released. Haslegrave signed for Crewe Alexandra in August 1981 and after two seasons with a struggling Crewe side moved to York City, where his former Stoke teammate Denis Smith was manager. He helped York to promotion to the Third Division, with a record points haul, and made over 150 first team appearances in four seasons.

In August 1987, Haslegrave joined a Torquay side that had just avoided relegation out of the league in the last few minutes of the previous season. However, under new manager Cyril Knowles the side was transformed and reached the Fourth Division play-offs and the Football League Trophy final at Wembley. Haslegrave began coaching at Torquay and by the time he left in 1989 had become Knowles' assistant. He was described in an autobiography by former England player Lee Sharpe, who had joined Torquay as an apprentice during Haslegrave's first season at the club, as the 'ultimate midfield terrier'.

== Personal life ==
On retiring he returned to Preston North End to coach the youth team and became Director of the club's Centre of Excellence. On leaving North End he became Head Coach at Cardinal Newman College and subsequently was also invited to coach the English Colleges side. Haslegrave held a UEFA (A) coaching badge and was a representative of Anglo-Deities United, a Lancashire-based charity which deals with the elderly. He was football coach at Cardinal Newman College in Preston and head coach of the English Colleges Team. In May 2012 he walked 1,500 miles to Spain for charity.

== Career statistics ==
Appearances and goals by club, season and competition
Club	Season	League			FA Cup		League Cup		Other		Total	
Club	Season	Division	Apps	Goals	Apps	Goals	Apps	Goals	Apps	Goals	Apps	Goals
Stoke City	1970–71	First Division	15	0	7	0	0	0	4 (Note: Appearances in Anglo-Italian Cup)	0	26	0
Stoke City	1971–72	First Division	18	0	0	0	3	1	3 (Note: Appearances in Texaco Cup)	1	24	2
Stoke City	1972–73	First Division	6	2	0	0	0	0	0	0	6	2
Stoke City	1973–74	First Division	27	1	1	1	4	0	5 (Note: Two appearances in Texaco Cup and three in Watney Cup)	0	37	2
Stoke City	1974–75	First Division	19	1	0	0	3	0	2 (Note: Appearances in UEFA Cup)	0	24	1
Stoke City	1975–76	First Division	28	1	0	0	1	0	—		29	1
Stoke City	Total		113	5	8	1	11	1	14	1	146	8
Nottingham Forest	1976–77	Second Division	7	1	0	0	0	0	6 (Note: Appearances in Anglo-Scottish Cup)	0	13	1
Preston North End	1977–78	Third Division	38	0	2	0	0	0	0	0	40	0
Preston North End	1978–79	Second Division	41	1	2	0	3	0	3	1	49	2
Preston North End	1979–80	Second Division	25	0	1	0	1	0	4	1	31	1
Preston North End	1980–81	Second Division	8	1	0	0	0	0	2	0	10	1
Preston North End	Total		113	2	5	0	4	0	9	2	131	4
Crewe Alexandra	1981–82	Fourth Division	40	1	2	1	2	0	—		44	2
Crewe Alexandra	1982–83	Fourth Division	42	0	1	0	2	0	—		45	0
Crewe Alexandra	Total		82	1	3	1	4	0	—		89	2
York City	1983–84	Fourth Division	26	1	0	0	2	0	1 (Note: Appearances in Associate Members' Cup)	0	29	1
York City	1984–85	Third Division	42	0	6	0	4	0	2	0	54	0
York City	1985–86	Third Division	39	0	4	0	4	0	1	0	48	0
York City	1986–87	Third Division	35	0	1	0	2	0	3	0	41	0
York City	Total		142	0	11	0	12	0	7	0	172	2
Torquay United	1987–88	Fourth Division	33	1	3	0	4	0	5 (Note: Three Appearances in Associate Members' Cup and two in Fourth Division play-offs)	0	45	1
Torquay United	1988–89	Fourth Division	2	0	0	0	1	0	0	0	3	0
Torquay United	Total		36	1	3	0	5	0	5	0	47	1
Career Total			493	10	29	2	36	1	41	3	599	16

== Honours ==
York City

- Football League Fourth Division: 1983–84
