= Bill Cranston =

Scottish footballer (1942–2022)

William Cranston (18 January 1942 – 10 January 2022) was a Scottish professional footballer who played for Blackpool, Preston North End and Oldham Athletic.

== Career ==
Cranston was a centre back who began his career at Blackpool, making 33 league appearances between 1961 and 1965. He joined Preston North End during the 1964–65 season and made 87 League appearances and scored one goal for the Deepdale club. He was named the club's Official Player of the Year in 1969–70, having made 16 appearances that season. He moved to Oldham Athletic in 1970.

Cranston died on 10 January 2022, aged 79.
