= Simon Westwell =

English footballer

Personal information
- Full name: Simon Westwell
- Date of birth: 12 November 1961 (age 64)
- Place of birth: Clitheroe, England
- Position: Right back

Senior career*
| Years | Team | Apps | (Gls) |
| 1980–1983 | Preston North End | 63 | (1) |
| 1983–1986 | Chorley | | |
| 1987–1988 | Colne Dynamoes | | |
| 1990–1991 | Accrington Stanley | | |
| 1995–1996 | Clitheroe | | |
- * Club domestic league appearances and goals

Simon Westwell (born 12 November 1961) is an English former professional footballer who played in the Football League as a right back.
