= Adam Henderson (footballer) =

English footballer

Personal information
- Full name: Adam Henderson
- Date of birth: 16 July 1873
- Place of birth: Darlington, England
- Position: Winger

Senior career*
Years	Team	Apps	(Gls)
1891–1892	Airdrie Fruitfield		
1892–1893	Airdrieonians		
1894–1897	Preston North End	77	(28)
1897–1898	Celtic	9	(4)
1898	Bristol St George		
1898–1899	Gravesend United		
1899–1901	Preston North End	41	(13)
Total		122	(45)
- * Club domestic league appearances and goals

Adam Henderson (16 July 1873–unknown) was an English footballer who played in the Football League for Preston North End.
