= Paul McGee (footballer, born 1954) =

Irish footballer

Personal information
- Full name: Paul Gerard McGee
- Date of birth: 19 June 1954 (age 72)
- Place of birth: Sligo, Ireland
- Height: 5 ft 10 in (1.78 m)
- Position: Forward

Senior career*
Years	Team	Apps	(Gls)
1970–1972	Sligo Rovers	34	(3)
1972–1973	Kidderminster Harriers	35	(8)
1973–1974	Hereford United	0	(0)
1974–1975	Finn Harps	34	(7)
1974	→ Toronto Italia (loan)	36	(26)
1975–1977	Sligo Rovers	76	(26)
1975–1977	→ Montreal Castors (loan)	93	(67)
1977–1979	Queens Park Rangers	39	(7)
1979–1981	Preston North End	66	(13)
1981–1983	Burnley	34	(9)
1983	→ Dundalk (loan)	5	(1)
1983–1984	Sligo Rovers	25	(5)
1984	Shamrock Rovers	9	(4)
1984	Preston North End	2	(0)
1984	Ballymena United	1	(0)
1985	Waterford United	9	(1)
1985	Sligo Rovers	7	(4)
1985–1986	Galway United	27	(19)
1986–1987	HFC Haarlem	14	(2)
1987–1990	Galway United	96	(46)
1990	Derry City	7	(0)
1990–1991	Sligo Rovers	21	(7)
1991	Athlone Town	7	(1)
1991–1992	Sligo Rovers	23	(6)
1992	Galway United	16	(9)
1992–1994	Finn Harps	9	(4)

International career
1977–1978	Republic of Ireland U21	2	(0)
1978–1980	Republic of Ireland	15	(4)
1977	League of Ireland XI	1	(0)

Managerial career
- 2007: Limerick 37
- 2011: Salthill Devon
- * Club domestic league appearances and goals

Paul Gerard McGee (born 19 June 1954) is an Irish former footballer who played as a forward and, as of 2024, is Galway United's all-time leading goalscorer across all competitions. As of 2019, McGee is also eleventh in the all-time League of Ireland goalscoring list with 143 league goals.

He started his career with his hometown club, Sligo Rovers, and had six different spells playing for Sligo over the course of his career.

== Career ==
Paul McGee was born on 19 June 1954 in Sligo. He started his career with his local club, Sligo Rovers, although sources differ as to whether he made his debut at 15 years of age or in a 2–2 draw at home to Finn Harps on 15 November 1970, when McGee would have been sixteen. Following the 1971–72 season, McGee earned a transfer to English football with Kidderminster Harriers. From there, he moved to Hereford United but was confined to their reserve team during his time at the club. Rather than play in the West Midlands League, he decided to return to Ireland and was signed by Patsy McGowan, then manager of Finn Harps, in 1974. McGee remained at Finn Park for eighteen months and was a member of the Finn Harps team that won the FAI Cup in 1974.

=== League title with Sligo ===
McGee rejoined his home town club Sligo Rovers in 1975 and won the 1976–77 League of Ireland league championship. In the penultimate game of the season, he got the winner against Albert Rovers in Cork which meant the league would be decided on the final day. On Easter Sunday, Sligo beat Shamrock Rovers 3–1 at home to seal the league title, with McGee assisting Sligo's second goal from a corner and scoring the third himself. On 21 September 1977, he scored twice for a League of Ireland XI against the Republic of Ireland national team and was approached after the game by former Queens Park Rangers forward Barry Bridges, who was playing for St. Patrick's Athletic at the time. Bridges set up a trial with the Loftus Road club and McGee signed for Queens Park Rangers in November 1977.

=== The English Football League ===
In McGee's first season with the club, Queens Park Rangers finished 19th in the First Division table, just outside the relegation zone. The club were relegated at the end of the 1978–79 season, and Frank Sibley was replaced as manager by Tommy Docherty. After Docherty informed him that he wasn't in the manager's squad plans, McGee transferred to Preston North End. In his second season with the club, Preston were relegated to the Third Division. McGee was joined at Deepdale by his former manager Docherty, who sent him on loan to Burnley in November 1981. After scoring four goals in five games, he was recalled by the new Preston manager, Gordon Lee, before eventually transferring back to Burnley. He won the Second Division with the Turf Moor outfit and scored twice in the 4–1 win over Southend that secured the title.

=== Return to the League of Ireland ===
Burnley loaned McGee to Dundalk where he played out the end of the 1982–83 season before he was released by Burnley that summer. In August 1983, McGee returned to Sligo Rovers for the second time. Sligo had won the 1983 FAI Cup and expectations of McGee heading into the 1983–84 season were high but, by his own admission, he failed to deliver. He also injured his knee away to Finn Harps soon after joining, but came back early from injury to play against FC Haka in the 1983–84 European Cup Winners' Cup, which McGee later regretted. In played several summer months abroad in the National Soccer League with Toronto Italia, and Montreal Castors.

McGee signed for Shamrock Rovers in August 1984. He made a scoring debut with 2 goals on the 26th against Home Farm in a 4–2 win at Milltown. His last appearance was against his home town club in a 4–0 win on 11 November 1978. In total he played 15 times for the Hoops, including twice in the European Cup, scoring 5 goals.

McGee joined Galway United for the 1985–86 season. On 15 January 1986, McGee scored in the 2–0 League Cup final victory over Dundalk that saw United win their first senior trophy. He finished the season with 13 goals, the second highest in the league. While at Galway United he scored in the 1986–87 UEFA Cup at FC Groningen. His impressive displays earned him a move to HFC Haarlem for the rest of the 1986–87 Eredivisie season. During his time there his opponents included Marco van Basten and Ruud Gullit. He returned to Galway United after a solitary season with Haarlem and spent the next three years with the Tribesmen. He became the club's player-manager during the 1989–90 season. When he departed Galway in 1990, he was the club's all-time top goalscorer in both the league and across all competitions. His league record of 74 goals was surpassed by Alan Murphy in 2018 but, as of 2024, McGee remains Galway United's record goalscorer in all competitions.

He moved to Derry City for the 1990–91 League of Ireland Premier Division season but by November he had moved back to his home town club. However, he did play in the 1990–91 UEFA Cup for the Candystripes.

In January 1993 McGee moved clubs for the 34th occasion, a record for an Irish player.

At the end of the 2012 League of Ireland season McGee is eleventh in the all-time League of Ireland goalscoring list with 143 league goals

=== International career ===
In his Ireland career, he scored 4 goals in 15 matches between 1978 and 1980 and also won 10 youth caps and 2 U21 caps. His full international debut came against Turkey and he scored with a diving header in a 4–2 victory. He scored a further three times for his country, including a goal against Czechoslovakia while they were European champions. He twice played against World Cup winners Argentina, in a team featuring Maradona, and played in a 1–1 draw against England in Dublin during the 1980 qualification campaign for the European Championship. In January 1977 he played for the League of Ireland XI team against Italian League B which included Gaetano Scirea.

== Coaching career ==
McGee coached youth sides at Crystal Palace and Queen Park Rangers before taking the reins at Salthill Devon. He coached the club's under-21 team as they won the National Under-21 League in 2005–06. In January 2007, McGee was appointed manager of Limerick 37 F.C. in the League of Ireland First Division. He was sacked in December despite the team achieving a 4th-place position in the league.

In January 2008 he was appointed assistant manager to Alan Mathews at Cork City. In August 2008 he lost his job as Cork went into examinership. In May 2011, McGee returned to Salthill Devon as first team manager.

== Honours ==
Burnley

- Football League Third Division: 1981–82
