= Ian Cochrane (footballer) =

Scottish footballer

Personal information
- Full name: John Cochrane
- Date of birth: 27 April 1959 (age 67)
- Place of birth: Bellshill, Scotland
- Position: Winger

Youth career
- Preston North End

Senior career*
Years	Team	Apps	(Gls)
1976–1979	Preston North End	5	(2)
1979–1980	Dundee United	1	(0)
1980–1983	Greenock Morton	75	(5)
1983–1984	Hamilton Academical	19	(0)
1984	Queen of the South	6	(2)
1984	Partick Thistle	10	(2)
1984–1986	Cowdenbeath	47	(3)
- * Club domestic league appearances and goals

John "Ian" Cochrane (born 27 April 1959) is a Scottish former footballer, who played as a winger. Cochrane began his career in the mid-1970s with Preston North End before returning to Scotland with Dundee United. After just one match at Tannadice, Cochrane moved west to Greenock Morton, spending three seasons with the Cappielow side. After leaving Ton, Cochrane had spells with Hamilton Academical, Queen of the South, Partick Thistle and Cowdenbeath. It is unclear where his career headed after leaving Cowdenbeath in 1986.
