= Ray Treacy (footballer) =

Irish footballer and manager

Personal information
- Full name: Raymond Christopher Patrick Treacy
- Date of birth: 18 June 1946
- Place of birth: Dublin, Republic of Ireland
- Date of death: 10 April 2015 (aged 68)
- Position: Striker

Youth career
- –1964: Home Farm

Senior career*
| Years | Team | Apps | (Gls) |
| 1964–1968 | West Bromwich Albion | 5 | (1) |
| 1967–1972 | Charlton Athletic | 149 | (43) |
| 1972–1974 | Swindon Town | 55 | (16) |
| 1973–1976 | Preston North End | 58 | (11) |
| 1974–1975 | → Oldham Athletic (loan) | 3 | (1) |
| 1976–1977 | West Bromwich Albion | 21 | (6) |
| 1978 | Toronto Metros-Croatia | 23 | (5) |
| 1977–1980 | Shamrock Rovers | 71 | (35) |
| 1980–1982 | Drogheda United | 26 | (11) |
| Total | | 411 | (129) |

International career
| 1978–1979 | League of Ireland XI | 2 | (0) |
| 1966 | Republic of Ireland U23 | 1 | (0) |
| 1966–1980 | Republic of Ireland | 42 | (5) |

Managerial career
- 1980–1982: Drogheda United
- 1982–1990: Home Farm
- 1992–1996: Shamrock Rovers
- * Club domestic league appearances and goals

Raymond Christopher Patrick Treacy (18 June 1946 – 10 April 2015) was an Irish professional footballer.

== Playing career ==
He played 42 times (scoring 5 goals) for the Republic of Ireland national football team between 1966 and 1980. Treacy played 3 times scoring twice whilst at Milltown.

He made his international debut on 4 May 1966 in a 4–0 defeat against West Germany, his last was against Czechoslovakia in 1980. He played in the first ever Republic of Ireland U23 game in 1966.

As a youth Treacy played with Home Farm. He made five first team appearances for West Bromwich Albion, scoring one goal, before joining Charlton Athletic in February 1968. Later moving to join Swindon Town, Preston North End, Oldham Athletic (on loan). He agreed terms with Port Vale in August 1976 but didn't sign for them, instead returning to West Bromwich Albion where he finished his English career. In 290 league appearances he scored 78 goals.

He then joined the Shamrock Rovers in 1977 under Johnny Giles and in three seasons at Milltown he scored 35 league goals from the 71 games he played in. He made 3 appearances in European competitions, but was most prominently remembered by Rovers fans when his penalty against Sligo helped win the FAI Cup in 1978.

Treacy almost scored a hat trick for the Republic of Ireland national football team against Turkey in April 1978. The two goals he scored (along with the game's opening goal by Johnny Giles) represented the last occasion that a home-based player had scored for the senior Irish national team until 40 years later when in June 2018, Graham Burke, also a Shamrock Rovers player, scored against the United States.

Treacy represented the League of Ireland in a friendly against Argentina in the Boca Junior Stadium in April 1978. In all he earned two Inter League caps during his spell at Milltown. In April 1979 Treacy was sent off after coming on as a substitute for the League of Ireland XI against Italian League B.

== Management career ==
He was player/manager at Drogheda United for two seasons from 1980 scoring 11 goals resigning on 19 December 1982. He then managed Home Farm. He was granted a testimonial against the full national side in May 1989. Controversially he was one of the backers behind the baffling move to install "Dublin City" into the Scottish Second Division in January 1990 despite managing in the League of Ireland at the same time. He resigned from the Farm in September 1990.

He returned to Rovers as manager in January 1992 and won the title in the 1993–94 season, but the team was beaten 7–0 by Górnik Zabrze in the following season's UEFA Cup.

In October 2009 he retired from his travel business. He died after a short illness in 2015.
