= Mel Holden =

Scottish footballer

Personal information
- Full name: Melville George Holden
- Date of birth: 25 August 1954
- Place of birth: Dundee, Scotland
- Date of death: 31 January 1981 (aged 26)
- Place of death: Preston, England
- Position: Forward

Youth career
- Preston North End

Senior career*
Years	Team	Apps	(Gls)
1972–1975	Preston North End	72	(22)
1975–1978	Sunderland	73	(23)
1978	Blackpool	3	(0)
1978–1979	PEC Zwolle	10	(1)
Total		158	(46)
- * Club domestic league appearances and goals

Melville George Holden (25 August 1954 – 31 January 1981) was a Scottish professional footballer who played as a forward. Active in both England and the Netherlands, Holden made nearly 150 career League appearances, scoring nearly 50 goals.

== Career ==
Born in Dundee, Holden played for the youth team of Preston North End, and made his senior debut in 1972. He later played for Sunderland and Blackpool, before moving to the Netherlands to play with PEC Zwolle.

== Later life and death ==
Holden died of motor neurone disease in early 1981, aged 26; the illness had forced his retirement from playing some two years previously. After his death, Preston player Peter Litchfield donated £1,000 he had received for winning a Man of the Match award to a motor neurone charity.
