= John Bird (footballer, born 1948) =

English footballer and manager

Personal information
- Full name: John Charles Bird
- Date of birth: 9 June 1948 (age 78)
- Place of birth: Doncaster, England
- Height: 6 ft 0 in (1.83 m)
- Position: Defender

Senior career*
Years	Team	Apps	(Gls)
1967–1971	Doncaster Rovers	50	(3)
1971–1975	Preston North End	166	(9)
1975–1980	Newcastle United	87	(5)
1980–1985	Hartlepool United	151	(16)

Managerial career
- 1986–1988: Hartlepool United
- 1988–1991: York City
- 1994–1996: Halifax Town
- * Club domestic league appearances and goals

John Charles Bird (born 9 June 1948) is an English former professional footballer and manager.

Bird's transfer from Preston North End to Newcastle United in 1975 prompted the resignation of Preston manager Bobby Charlton. A week later, head coach and caretaker manager Nobby Stiles also resigned, although he returned to the club as manager two years later.

== Life after football ==
After leaving football, Bird pursued his interest in art full-time, becoming a professional painter and gallery curator.

== Managerial stats ==
Team	Nat	From	To	Record				
Team	Nat	From	To	G	W	L	D	Win %
Hartlepool United	(England)	1 November 1986	1 October 1988	94	32	35	27	34.04
York City	(England)	1 October 1988	23 October 1991	155	46	61	48	29.67
