= Gary Williams (footballer, born 1954) =

English footballer

Personal information
- Full name: Gary S. Peter Williams
- Date of birth: 8 March 1954 (age 72)
- Place of birth: Liverpool, England
- Position: Defender

Youth career
- Marine

Senior career*
Years	Team	Apps	(Gls)
1971–1977	Preston North End	112	(2)
1977–1982	Brighton and Hove Albion	158	(8)
1982–1983	Crystal Palace	10	(0)
1983–1984	Whitehawk		
- * Club domestic league appearances and goals

Gary S. Peter Williams (born 8 March 1954) is an English former professional footballer who played in the Football League, as a defender for Preston North End, Brighton and Crystal Palace.

== Career ==
Williams began his youth career at Marine and in 1971, signed for Preston North End. He made 112 League appearances for Preston, scoring twice, before signing for Brighton in 1977, for whom he made 158 League appearances scoring eight times. Williams is remembered for an 86th-minute winner and goal of the season contender for the club against Champions Nottingham Forest at the Goldstone on 29 March 1980.

In July 1982, Williams signed for Crystal Palace and made his debut in the first match of the 1982–83 season in a home 1–1 draw against Barnsley. He went on to make 10 consecutive appearances plus a further 3 in the League Cup before sustaining an injury which ultimately ended his professional career in 1983.

Williams then returned to Brighton for a further season in the Sussex County League with Whitehawk, representing Sussex and being part of the Hawks Championship winning team in 1984.
