= Danny Cameron (footballer) =

Scottish footballer

Personal information
- Full name: Daniel Cameron
- Date of birth: 9 November 1953 (age 72)
- Place of birth: Dundee, Scotland
- Position: Left back

Senior career*
Years	Team	Apps	(Gls)
1973–1976	Sheffield Wednesday	31	(1)
1974–1975	→ Colchester United (loan)	5	(0)
1975–1981	Preston North End	122	(0)
1981–1982	Dundee	28	(1)
1982–1983	Hellenic	?	(?)
Total		186	(2)
- * Club domestic league appearances and goals

Daniel Cameron (born 9 November 1953) is a Scottish footballer who played as a left back in the Football League.
