= John McMahon (footballer, born 1949) =

English footballer

Personal information
- Date of birth: 7 December 1949 (age 76)
- Place of birth: Manchester, England
- Position: Right back

Senior career*
Years	Team	Apps	(Gls)
1970–1979	Preston North End	257	(7)
1970	→ Southend United (loan)	4	(0)
1979	→ Chesterfield (loan)	1	(0)
1979–1981	Crewe Alexandra	67	(2)
1981–1983	Wigan Athletic	71	(5)
1983–1984	Tranmere Rovers	40	(0)
- Altrincham
Total		440	(14)
- * Club domestic league appearances and goals

John McMahon (born 7 December 1949 in Manchester) is an English former footballer.

A full-back who joined Preston North End in 1965 aged sixteen, he made his first team debut on 6 October 1970 in a League Cup tie against West Bromwich Albion.

He had a loan spell at Southend United in 1970-71 (playing 4 games) before establishing himself as a first team regular in 1971-72 when he was named as the club's Player of the Year.

In total he played 291 games for Preston (including 1 as substitute) between 1970 and 1979 and scored 6 goals. He played one game on loan at Chesterfield before moving to Crewe Alexandra in 1979.
