= Alex Bruce (footballer, born 1952) =

Scottish footballer

Personal information
- Full name: Alexander Robert Bruce
- Date of birth: 23 December 1952 (age 73)
- Place of birth: Dundee, Scotland
- Height: 5 ft 8 in (1.73 m)
- Position: Forward

Senior career*
Years	Team	Apps	(Gls)
1971–1974	Preston North End	62	(22)
1974–1975	Newcastle United	20	(3)
1975–1983	Preston North End	301	(135)
1983–1985	Wigan Athletic	43	(7)

International career
1974	Scotland U23	1	(0)
- * Club domestic league appearances and goals

Alexander Robert Bruce (born 23 December 1952) is a Scottish footballer who played as a striker for Preston North End, Newcastle United and Wigan Athletic.

Born in Dundee, Scotland, Bruce began his career with Preston North End in 1971. He became a cult figure with the Preston supporters and was a prolific striker, finishing as the highest goal scorer, a club record, eight seasons out of ten during the 1970s and early 1980s. He remains to date the club's second highest all time goal scorer, only bettered by club stalwart Sir Tom Finney. In January 1974 he joined Newcastle United for a fee reported as £140,000 or £150,000. He made his debut in February 1974 in a 3–1 defeat against Southampton and scored on his home debut at St James' Park but struggled to hold a regular first team place ahead of the club's more established strikers. He made 20 league appearances and scored three goals during his 18-month spell at the club. In August 1975, he re-joined his former club when Newcastle signed John Bird from Preston in exchange for Bruce and £60,000 – a transfer which prompted the resignation of Preston manager Bobby Charlton. On his return to Preston he struck up a successful strike partnership with Mike Elwiss and under manager Nobby Stiles helped guide Preston to league promotion in 1978, Bruce winning a golden boot by finishing the season as the league's highest goal scorer. He stayed at Preston until 1983 when he joined local side Wigan Athletic as a player and coach before retiring from football due to a knee injury in 1985.

Following football, Alex forged a successful career in leisure management and finished his career as Head of Leisure at South Ribble Borough Council.
