= Steve Doyle (footballer) =

Welsh footballer

Personal information
- Full name: Stephen Charles Doyle
- Date of birth: 2 June 1958 (age 68)
- Place of birth: Neath, Wales
- Height: 5 ft 9 in (1.75 m)
- Position: Midfielder

Senior career*
Years	Team	Apps	(Gls)
1974–1982	Preston North End	197	(8)
1982–1987	Huddersfield Town	161	(6)
1987–1989	Sunderland	100	(2)
1989–1991	Hull City	47	(2)
1991–1994	Rochdale	121	(1)
Total		626	(19)
- * Club domestic league appearances and goals

Stephen Charles Doyle (born 2 June 1958) is a Welsh former professional football midfielder who made 626 appearances in the Football League playing for Preston North End, Huddersfield Town, Sunderland, Hull City and Rochdale. He also gained a cap for the Wales U-21s in 1978.

== Honours ==
Sunderland

- Football League Third Division: 1987–88
