= Mike Elwiss =

English footballer

Personal information
- Full name: Michael Walter Elwiss
- Date of birth: 2 May 1954 (age 72)
- Place of birth: Doncaster, England
- Height: 6 ft 0 in (1.83 m)
- Position: Forward

Youth career
- Doncaster Rovers

Senior career*
Years	Team	Apps	(Gls)
1971–1974	Doncaster Rovers	97	(30)
1974–1978	Preston North End	192	(60)
1978–1980	Crystal Palace	20	(7)
1980	→ Preston North End (loan)	10	(3)
- * Club domestic league appearances and goals

Michael Walter Elwiss (born 2 May 1954 in Doncaster) is an English former footballer who scored 100 goals from 314 games in the Football League playing as a forward for Doncaster Rovers, Preston North End and Crystal Palace.

He joined Doncaster Rovers as a junior, and scored twice in a 3–1 win against Newport County in October 1971 on his Football League debut. He was the club's top scorer in his first full season, repeated the feat the following year, then, having scored 34 goals from 108 appearances in all competitions, he joined Preston North End in February 1974 for a club record £70,000 fee.

He scored both goals in a 2–2 draw against Carlisle United in his debut on 2 March 1974. He was twice named as the club's Player of the Year, and his strike partnership with Alex Bruce helped the club to promotion to the Second Division in 1978. After 60 goals from 192 league appearances, he joined Crystal Palace for a club record fee of £200,000. He played 20 games for Palace, scoring 7 goals, and helped them to promotion to the First Division in 1979, but a knee injury effectively finished his career. He returned to Deepdale on loan in March 1980, making a further 10 appearances and scoring 3 goals, before his injury forced his retirement at the age of 27.
