= Francis Burns (footballer) =

Scottish footballer

Personal information
- Full name: Francis Burns
- Date of birth: 17 October 1948 (age 78)
- Place of birth: Glenboig, North Lanarkshire, Scotland
- Height: 5 ft 9 in (1.75 m)
- Position: Left back

Youth career
- 1964–1965: Manchester United

Senior career*
Years	Team	Apps	(Gls)
1965–1972	Manchester United	121	(6)
1972–1973	Southampton	21	(0)
1973–1981	Preston North End	273	(9)
1981–1982	Shamrock Rovers	16	(0)
Total		431	(15)

International career
1969	Scotland	1	(0)
- * Club domestic league appearances and goals

Francis Burns (born 17 October 1948) is a Scottish former footballer.

== Playing career ==
=== Manchester United ===
Burns was a talented left-back and captained Scotland Schoolboys and won Scottish Youth international honours. He joined Manchester United in 1965 and made his first team debut in September 1967. There, he made 121 league appearances, scoring 6 goals and won one Scotland cap on 5 November 1969, against Austria. This was the only full international cap he ever gained.

He played in six of the matches in Manchester United's run to the 1968 European Cup final, although he lost his place in the final to Shay Brennan. During his time at Old Trafford he underwent three cartilage operations.

=== Southampton ===
Burns was signed by Ted Bates for £50,000 for Southampton in 1972. Unfortunately, his injury jinx continued and he required a further cartilage operation as well as suffering a serious thigh injury. He was unable to displace Joe Kirkup as the first-choice left-back and towards the end of the season he lost his place to up and coming youngster Steve Mills. He made 21 league appearances for the Saints, before moving back to Lancashire.

=== Preston North End ===
He became former United teammate Bobby Charlton's first signing as manager of Preston North End in 1973, making his debut for the Deepdale club against Aston Villa on 25 August 1973 and ended his first season being named as the club's Player of the Year. He made a total of 314 appearances (including 2 as substitute) and scored 9 league goals for Preston.

=== Shamrock Rovers ===
He moved to Shamrock Rovers in 1981 making his debut on 11 October at Glenmalure Park. In total he made 20 appearances which included a League Cup Final loss on New Year's Eve. His experience and motivational qualities were a big help to that young Hoops side.

== After football ==
In February 1987, he emigrated to Perth, Western Australia where he set up an industrial cleaning business as well as coaching in local football.

== Honours ==
Manchester United

- European Cup: 1967–68
