= Mick Baxter =

English footballer

Mick Baxter (born 30 December 1956 – 16 January 1989) was an English footballer who played as a defender for Preston North End, Middlesbrough and Portsmouth

He died of cancer in January 1989, aged 32.
