= Roy Tunks =

German-born English footballer

Personal information
- Full name: Roy William Tunks
- Date of birth: 21 January 1951 (age 75)
- Place of birth: Wuppertal, Germany
- Height: 6 ft 1 in (1.85 m)
- Position: Goalkeeper

Youth career
- Rotherham United

Senior career*
Years	Team	Apps	(Gls)
1968–1974	Rotherham United	138	(0)
1969	→ York City (loan)	4	(0)
1974–1981	Preston North End	277	(0)
1981–1988	Wigan Athletic	245	(0)
1988	Hartlepool United	5	(0)
1988–1990	Preston North End	25	(0)
Total		694	(0)
- * Club domestic league appearances and goals

Roy William Tunks (born 21 January 1951) is a German-born English former professional footballer who played as a goalkeeper. He made over 850 appearances in a playing career spanning over twenty years.

He was signed for a record fee by Preston North End in 1974 as a goalkeeper from Rotherham United where he was known as the "boy with the golden gloves". He played well over 300 games for Preston North End, and was the club's Player of the Year for the 1979–80 season.

He moved to Wigan Athletic in 1981, and was part of the team that won the Associate Members' Cup in 1985.

After retiring in 1990, Tunks moved into coaching. He joined the FA and worked with England youngsters at under 16 to under 20 level. He also worked at Premier League clubs Blackburn Rovers and Newcastle United as a goalkeeping coach. He was part of the backroom staff at Tranmere Rovers before moving on to become head of Goalkeeping Department at Manchester City.

== Honours ==
Wigan Athletic

- Associate Members' Cup: 1984–85
