= Gordon Coleman =

English footballer

Personal information
- Full name: Gordon Michael Coleman
- Date of birth: 11 February 1954 (age 72)
- Place of birth: Nottingham, England
- Position: Midfielder

Youth career
- 1970–1973: Padstow Youth Club

Senior career*
Years	Team	Apps	(Gls)
1973–1983	Preston North End	269	(25)
1983–1984	Bury	29	(5)
1984	Morecambe		
- * Club domestic league appearances and goals

Gordon Michael Coleman (born 11 February 1954) is an English former professional footballer who played as a midfielder. He began his career with Preston North End, remaining with the club for ten years and making over 300 appearances in all competitions before joining Bury in 1983. He spent one season with Bury and briefly played for Morecambe before retiring from football.

== Career ==
Born in Nottingham, Coleman was keen on several sports as a child. He represented the county of Nottingham at cricket and played youth football until the age of 11, when he moved to a local grammar school where they only played rugby. He eventually returned to playing football at the age of 16, joining local team Padstow Youth Club. Having achieved 7 O levels and 2 A levels at school, Coleman was set to attend a teacher training college but was recommended to Peter Robinson, the chief scout at Preston North End, by Tommy Capel. He attended a week-long training camp at the club, living in a local hostel during his stay, and impressed enough to remain with the club for six weeks before being offered a one-year contract by manager Bobby Charlton. He moved to Preston, sharing a house with teammate Eric Snookes, playing in two reserve team matches before being handed his professional debut during a 2–0 victory over West Bromwich Albion on 1 October 1973.

Coleman eventually established himself in the first team, helping the club win promotion from Division Three during the 1977–78 season, and played in every outfield position for the club during his time at Deepdale. In 1982, he scored the winning goal during a 2–1 victory over Preston's West Lancashire rivals Blackpool in the second round of the FA Cup while sitting down in the opposition penalty area. Having fallen to the ground during an attack, Coleman headed the ball while sitting down, sending the ball over the head of defender Terry Pashley to win the match. In August 1983, Coleman left Preston after making over 300 appearances for the club in all competitions, having lost his place in the first-team due to injury. He instead joined Bury where he spent one season before joining Morecambe.

== After football ==
During the final years of his playing career, Coleman completed a degree in Social Psychology, and was employed by Wigan Metropolitan Borough Council following his retirement from playing. He returned to Nottingham 18 months later to become the manager of a local leisure centre, working towards a master's degree in business from Nottingham Trent University in his spare time. He later returned to football, spending five years working for the Professional Footballers' Association before working for Nottingham Forest.
