= 1993–94 Preston North End F.C. season =

Preston North End's 1993-1994 season

Preston North End
1993–94 season
- Chairman: Keith W. Leeming
- Manager: John Beck
- Stadium: Deepdale
- Third Division: 5th
- FA Cup: Fourth round
- League Cup: First round
- Football League Trophy: Second round
- Top goalscorer: League: Ellis (26); All: Ellis (30)
- Highest home attendance: 12790 vs Chester City
- Lowest home attendance: 4,941 vs Shrewsbury Town
- Average home league attendance: 7,426

During the 1993–94 English football season, Preston North End F.C. competed in the Football League Third Division.

== Final league table ==
Pos	Team	Pld	W	D	L	GF	GA	GD	Pts	Promotion or relegation
3	Crewe Alexandra (P)	42	21	10	11	80	61	+19	73	Promotion to the Second Division
4	Wycombe Wanderers (O, P)	42	19	13	10	67	53	+14	70	Qualification for the Third Division play-offs
5	Preston North End	42	18	13	11	79	60	+19	67	Qualification for the Third Division play-offs
6	Torquay United	42	17	16	9	64	56	+8	67	Qualification for the Third Division play-offs
7	Carlisle United	42	18	10	14	57	42	+15	64	Qualification for the Third Division play-offs

(O) Play-off winners; (P) Promoted

== Results ==
Preston North End's score comes first

=== Legend ===
Win	Draw	Loss

=== Football League Third Division ===
Date	Opponent	Venue	Result	Attendance	Scorers
14 August 1993	Crewe Alexandra	H	0-2	6,879	
21 August 1993	Scarborough	A	4-3	2,329	Ellis 2, Ainsworth 2
28 August 1993	Shrewsbury Town	H	6-1	4,941	Ainsworth 2, Conroy 3, Nebbeling
31 August 1993	Bury	H	3-1	5,886	Nebbeling, Conroy, Ellis
04 September 1993	Lincoln City	A	2-0	3,793	Ellis, Raynor
11 September 1993	Doncaster Rovers	H	3-1	7,294	Conroy, Matthewson, Raynor
18 September 1993	Torquay United	A	3-4	3,912	Conroy, Ellis, Ainsworth
25 September 1993	Mansfield Town	A	2-2	3,762	Ellis 2
02 October 1993	Colchester United	H	1-0	6,412	Ellis
09 October 1993	Chesterfield	H	4-1	6,581	Raynor, Ellis 3
16 October 1993	Wigan Athletic	A	2-2	3,741	Conroy, Challender
23 October 1993	Rochdale	H	2-1	8,491	Ellis 2
30 October 1993	Hereford United	A	3-2	3,383	Moyes, Ellis
02 November 1993	Walsall	A	0-2	4,446	
06 November 1993	Darlington	H	3-2	6,711	Nebbeling 2, Cartwright
20 November 1993	Carlisle United	A	1-0	10,279	Ellis
27 November 1993	Wycombe Wanderers	H	2-3	9,265	Ainsworth, Challender
11 December 1993	Scarborough	H	2-2	6,290	Bryson, Ellis
17 December 1993	Crewe Alexandra	A	3-4	6,035	Moyes, Conroy, Raynor
27 December 1993	Chester City	H	1-1	12,790	Ellis
01 January 1994	Scunthorpe United	H	2-2	7,669	Conroy, Norbury
04 January 1994	Bury	A	1-1	4,164	Norbury
15 January 1994	Wigan Athletic	H	3-0	7,728	Ellis 2, Conroy
22 January 1994	Chesterfield	A	1-1	3,804	Moyes
05 February 1994	Rochdale	A	1-2	4,317	Conroy
12 February 1994	Gillingham	H	0-0	6,167	
19 February 1994	Shrewsbury Town	A	0-1	5,391	
26 February 1994	Lincoln City	H	2-0	5,941	Conroy, Raynor
01 March 1994	Hereford United	H	3-0	6,641	Ellis 2, Bryson
04 March 1994	Doncaster Rovers	A	1-1	3,321	Yates (o.g.)
12 March 1994	Torquay United	H	3-1	6,641	Ellis 2, Sulley
15 March 1994	Northampton Town	A	0-2	3,845	
19 March 1994	Mansfield Town	H	3-1	6,747	Norbury 2, Ainsworth
26 March 1994	Colchester United	A	1-1	2,950	Norbury
02 April 1994	Chester City	A	2-3	5,638	Ainsworth, Ellis
04 April 1994	Northampton Town	H	1-1	7,517	Ainsworth
09 April 1994	Scunthorpe United	A	1-3	3,790	Ainsworth, Ellis
12 April 1994	Gillingham	A	2-2	2,453	Moyes, Green (og)
16 April 1994	Walsall	H	2-0	7,020	Ainsworth, Fensome
23 April 1994	Darlington	A	2-0	2,739	Raynor, Ellis
30 April 1994	Carlisle United	H	0-3	11,363	
07 May 1994	Wycombe Wanderers	A	1-1	7,442	Kidd

=== Football League Playoffs ===
Date	Opponent	Venue	Result	Attendance	Scorers
15 May 1994	Torquay United	A	0-2	4,440	
18 May 1994	Torquay United	H	4-1	11,442	Hicks, Moyes, Raynor, Ellis
28 May 1994	Wycombe Wanderers	Neutral	2-4	40,109	Bryson, Raynor

=== FA Cup ===
Round	Date	Opponent	Venue	Result	Attendance	Goalscorers
R1	13 November 1993	Mansfield Town	A	2-1	4,119	Ellis (2, 1pen)
R2	04 December 1993	Shrewsbury Town	A	1-0	5,018	Raynor
R3	08 January 1994	AFC Bournemouth	H	2-1	8,457	Moyes, Conroy
R4	29 January 1994	Kidderminster Harriers	A	0-1	7,000	

=== League Cup ===
Round	Date	Opponent	Venue	Result	Attendance	Goalscorers
R1	17 August 1993	Burnley	H	1-2	6,283	Ellis
R1	25 August 1993	Burnley	A	1-4	9,346	Cartwright

=== Football League Trophy ===
Round	Date	Opponent	Venue	Result	Attendance	Goalscorers
NR1	28 September 1993	Carlisle United	A	0-2	3,909	
NR1	19 October 1993	Burnley	H	2-1	4,485	Ainsworth, Ellis
NR2	30 November 1993	Huddersfield Town	A	0-0 (Lost 5-3 on pens)	1,379	

== Statistics ==
=== Appearances and goals ===
No.	Pos	Nat	Player	Total		Division Three		FA Cup		EFL Cup		EFL Trophy	
No.	Pos	Nat	Player	Apps	Goals	Apps	Goals	Apps	Goals	Apps	Goals	Apps	Goals
	DF	(England) ENG	Andy Fensome	37	1	31	1	4	0	0	0	2	0
	MF	(England) ENG	Christopher Holland	2	0	0 + 1	0	0	0	0	0	1	0
	DF	(England) ENG	Christopher Sulley	23	1	21	1	0	0	2	0	0	0
	DF	(Scotland) SCO	David Moyes	36	4	29	3	4	1	0	0	3	0
	DF	(England) ENG	Farrel Kilbane	1	0	0 + 1	0	0	0	0	0	0	0
	MF	(England) ENG	Gareth Ainsworth	46	14	34 + 4	13	2 + 1	0	2	0	3	1
	DF	(South Africa) RSA	Gavin Nebbeling	29	3	22	3	3	0	2	0	2	0
	MF	(England) ENG	Greg Challender	12	1	5 + 5	1	1	0	0	0	1	0
	MF	(Scotland) SCO	Ian Bryson	27	2	24 + 1	2	1 + 1	0	0	0	0	0
	DF	(England) ENG	Jamie Squires	4	0	4	0	0	0	0	0	0	0
	GK	(Republic of Ireland) IRL	Kelham O'Hanlon	28	0	23	0	2	0	2	0	1	0
	MF	(England) ENG	Kevin Magee	7	0	5 + 2	0	0	0	0	0	0	0
	GK	(England) ENG	Lee Bamber	1	0	0 + 1	0	0	0	0	0	0	0
	MF	(England) ENG	Lee Cartwright	44	2	36 + 3	1	3	0	2	1	0	0
	FW	(England) ENG	Mick Norbury	29	5	11 + 10	5	0 + 3	0	1 + 1	0	2 + 1	0
	FW	(Scotland) SCO	Mike Conroy	39	14	28 + 4	13	4	1	1	0	2	0
	MF	(England) ENG	Neil Whalley	8	0	1	0	1 + 1	0	2	0	3	0
	FW	(England) ENG	Paul Raynor	48	7	36 + 3	6	4	1	2	0	3	0
	DF	(England) ENG	Richard Lucas	30	0	21 + 3	0	4	0	0	0	2	0
	DF	(England) ENG	Ryan Kidd	43	1	35 + 1	1	4	0	1	0	2	0
	MF	(England) ENG	Simon Burton	5	0	2 + 1	0	0	0	0 + 1	0	0 + 1	0
	GK	(Scotland) SCO	Stephen Woods	24	0	19 + 1	0	2	0	0	0	2	0
	DF	(England) ENG	Stuart Hicks	4	0	3 + 1	0	0	0	0	0	0	0
	FW	(England) ENG	Tony Ellis	45	30	36 + 1	26	4	2	2	1	2	1
Player(s) who left during the season:
	DF	(Republic of Ireland) IRL	Aaron Callaghan	3	0	1	0	0	0	1	0	1	0
	FW	(England) ENG	Liam Watson	1	0	1	0	0	0	0	0	0	0
	DF	(England) ENG	Paul Masefield	9	0	6	0	1	0	1	0	1	0
	DF	(England) ENG	Trevor Matthewson	13	1	12	1	0	0	1	0	0	0

== Awards and Nominations ==
=== Club Awards ===
Award	Player	Notes	Ref.
Player of the Year	(England) Tony Ellis		
