= 1992–93 Preston North End F.C. season =

Preston North End's 1992-1993 season

Preston North End
1992–93 season
- Chairman: Keith W. Leeming
- Manager: Les Chapman (until 29th September); Sam Allardyce (until 6th December); John Beck (from 7th December)
- Stadium: Deepdale
- Second Division: 21st
- FA Cup: First round
- League Cup: First round
- Football League Trophy: First round
- Top goalscorer: League: Ellis (25); All: Ellis (22)
- Highest home attendance: 10,403 vs Blackpool
- Lowest home attendance: 3,329 vs Reading
- Average home league attendance: 5,723

During the 1992–93 English football season, Preston North End F.C. competed in the Football League Second Division.

== Final league table ==
Pos	Team	Pld	W	D	L	GF	GA	GD	Pts	Qualification or relegation
19	Exeter City	46	11	17	18	54	69	−15	50	
20	Hull City	46	13	11	22	46	69	−23	50	
21	Preston North End (R)	46	13	8	25	65	94	−29	47	Relegation to the Third Division
22	Mansfield Town (R)	46	11	11	24	52	80	−28	44	Relegation to the Third Division
23	Wigan Athletic (R)	46	10	11	25	43	72	−29	41	Relegation to the Third Division

Rules for classification: 1) Points; 2) Goals scored; 3) Goal difference
(R) Relegated

== Results ==
Preston North End's score comes first

=== Legend ===
Win	Draw	Loss

=== Football League Second Division ===
Date	Opponent	Venue	Result	Attendance	Scorers
15 August 1992	AFC Bournemouth	H	1-1	4,756	Ellis
22 August 1992	Fulham	A	1-2	3,641	Ellis
29 August 1992	Chester City	H	4-3	4,471	Cartwright, Flynn, Ashcroft, Leonard
05 September 1992	Brighton & Hove Albion	A	0-2	6,026	
12 September 1992	Burnley	H	2-0	7,209	Tinker, Ashcroft
15 September 1992	Hull City	A	4-2	4,463	Ellis 2, Ashcroft, Cartwright
19 September 1992	Bradford City	A	0-4	5,882	
26 September 1992	Hartlepool United	H	0-2	4,347	
03 October 1992	Plymouth Argyle	H	1-2	4,401	Davidson
10 October 1992	Blackpool	A	3-2	7,631	Ellis 3
17 October 1992	Stoke City	H	1-2	8,138	Aaron Callaghan
20 October 1992	Reading	H	2-0	3,329	Flitcroft, Ashcroft
24 October 1992	Mansfield Town	A	2-2	3,047	James, Fowler
31 October 1992	Bolton Wanderers	H	2-2	7,013	James, Cartwright
03 November 1992	Stockport County	A	0-3	4,860	
07 November 1992	Wigan Athletic	H	2-0	4,442	Callaghan, James
21 November 1992	Rotherham United	A	0-1	4,246	
28 November 1992	West Bromwich Albion	H	1-1	6,306	Ellis
12 December 1992	Port Vale	H	2-5	6,038	James, Ashcroft
18 December 1992	Leyton Orient	A	1-3	3,436	Ashcroft
28 December 1992	Exeter City	H	2-2	5,796	Garnett, Norbury
09 January 1993	Hull City	H	1-2	4,719	Garnett
16 January 1993	Hartlepool United	A	0-0	2,682	
23 January 1993	Bradford City	H	3-2	5,155	Norbury, James, Ellis
26 January 1993	Chester City	A	4-2	2,901	Norbury, Flynn, Ellis, Flitcroft
30 January 1993	Fulham	H	1-2	5,858	Ellis
06 February 1993	Bournemouth	A	1-2	3,601	Tinker
13 February 1993	Brighton & Hove Albion	H	1-0	4,334	Norbury
16 February 1993	Burnley	A	0-2	12,648	
20 February 1993	Reading	A	0-4	3,543	
27 February 1993	Blackpool	H	3-3	10,403	Ellis 2, Fowler
06 March 1993	Plymouth Argyle	A	0-4	5,201	
09 March 1993	Swansea City	H	1-3	4,396	Norbury
12 March 1993	Wigan Athletic	A	3-2	3,562	Norbury, Burton 2
17 March 1993	Huddersfield Town	A	0-1	4,915	
20 March 1993	Stockport County	H	2-3	5,255	Ellis 2
24 March 1993	West Bromwich Albion	A	2-3	13,270	Ellis, Ashcroft
27 March 1993	Rotherham United	H	5-2	4,859	Norbury 2, Ellis 3
06 April 1993	Port Vale	A	2-2	8,271	Ellis, Watson
10 April 1993	Huddersfield Town	H	2-1	7,647	Watson, Ellis
12 April 1993	Exeter City	A	1-0	3,410	Watson
17 April 1993	Leyton Orient	H	1-4	5,890	Burton
24 April 1993	Stoke City	A	0-1	18,334	
27 April 1993	Swansea City	A	0-2	6,933	
01 May 1993	Mansfield Town	H	1-5	5,889	Ellis
08 May 1993	Bolton Wanderers	A	0-1	21,270	

=== FA Cup ===
Round	Date	Opponent	Venue	Result	Attendance	Goalscorers
R1	14 November 1992	Bradford City	A	1-1	8,553	Fowler
R1R	25 November 1992	Bradford City	H	4-5	7,905	Davidson, Callaghan, Graham, Ellis

=== League Cup ===
Round	Date	Opponent	Venue	Result	Attendance	Goalscorers
R1	18 August 1992	Stoke City	H	2-1	5,581	Tinkler, Ellis
R1	26 August 1992	Stoke City	A	0-4	9,745	

=== Football League Trophy ===
Round	Date	Opponent	Venue	Result	Attendance	Goalscorers
NR1	01 December 1992	Blackpool	H	1-1	2,852	Ellis
NR1	06 January 1993	Wigan Athletic	A	1-2	1,932	Norbury

== Statistics ==
=== Appearances and goals ===
No.	Pos	Nat	Player	Total		Division Three		FA Cup		EFL Cup		EFL Trophy	
No.	Pos	Nat	Player	Apps	Goals	Apps	Goals	Apps	Goals	Apps	Goals	Apps	Goals
	DF	(Republic of Ireland) IRL	Aaron Callaghan	41	3	33 + 2	2	2	1	2	0	2	0
	GK	(England) ENG	Barry Siddall	1	0	1	0	0	0	0	0	0	0
	DF	(England) ENG	Colin Greenall	20	0	20	0	0	0	0	0	0	0
	DF	(England) ENG	Craig Allardyce	1	0	0 + 1	0	0	0	0	0	0	0
	DF	(Germany) GER	Craig Moylon	1	0	0 + 1	0	0	0	0	0	0	0
	MF	(England) ENG	David Christie	2	0	1 + 1	0	0	0	0	0	0	0
	MF	(England) ENG	David Eaves	6	0	1 + 3	0	0	0	0 + 1	0	1	0
	MF	(England) ENG	David Flitcroft	10	2	4 + 4	2	0	0	0 + 1	0	0 + 1	0
	FW	(Wales) WAL	Deiniol Graham	11	1	8	0	2	1	0	0	1	0
	MF	(England) ENG	Gareth Ainsworth	27	0	26	0	0	0	0	0	1	0
	GK	(England) ENG	Glenn Johnstone	10	0	10	0	0	0	0	0	0	0
	MF	(England) ENG	John Fowler	6	0	5 + 1	0	0	0	0	0	0	0
	MF	(England) ENG	John Tinkler	28	3	22 + 2	2	0 + 1	0	2	1	1	0
	DF	(England) ENG	Jonathan Davidson	27	2	18 + 3	1	2	1	2	0	2	0
	FW	(England) ENG	Lee Ashcroft	45	7	37 + 2	7	2	0	2	0	2	0
	MF	(England) ENG	Lee Cartwright	39	3	33 + 1	3	2	0	2	0	1	0
	MF	(England) ENG	Lee Fowler	36	3	29 + 3	2	2	1	2	0	0	0
	FW	(England) ENG	Liam Watson	8	3	6 + 2	3	0	0	0	0	0	0
	FW	(England) ENG	Mark Leonard	24	1	19 + 3	1	0	0	2	0	0	0
	DF	(England) ENG	Martin James	31	5	22 + 3	5	2	0	2	0	1 + 1	0
	FW	(England) ENG	Mick Norbury	22	9	21	8	0	0	0	0	1	1
	DF	(England) ENG	Mike Flynn	41	2	35	2	2	0	2	0	2	0
	MF	(England) ENG	Neil Whalley	14	0	14	0	0	0	0	0	0	0
	DF	(England) ENG	Richard Lucas	27	0	26	0	0	0	0	0	1	0
	DF	(England) ENG	Ryan Kidd	15	0	13 + 2	0	0	0	0	0	0	0
	DF	(England) ENG	Sam Allardyce	5	0	1 + 2	0	2	0	0	0	0	0
	MF	(England) ENG	Simon Burton	22	3	17 + 4	3	0	0	0	0	1	0
	GK	(England) ENG	Simon Farnworth	41	0	35	0	2	0	2	0	2	0
	MF	(England) ENG	Steve Finney	6	0	1 + 3	0	0 + 1	0	0	0	1	0
	FW	(England) ENG	Tony Ellis	40	25	34 + 1	22	2	1	2	1	1	1
Player(s) who featured whilst on loan but returned to parent club during the season:
	DF	(England) ENG	Shaun Garnett	11	2	10	2	0	0	0	0	1	0
	FW	(England) ENG	Colin Taylor	4	0	4	0	0	0	0	0	0	0

== Awards and Nominations ==
=== Club Awards ===
Award	Player	Notes	Ref.
Player of the Year	(England) Tony Ellis		
