= 1990–91 Preston North End F.C. season =

Preston North End's 1990–1991 season

Preston North End
1990–91 season
- Chairman: Keith W. Leeming
- Manager: Les Chapman
- Stadium: Deepdale
- Third Division: 17th
- FA Cup: First round
- League Cup: First round
- Football League Trophy: Northern Final
- Top goalscorer: League: Shaw (10); All: Shaw (15)
- Highest home attendance: 12,016 vs Burnley
- Lowest home attendance: 1,951 vs Rochdale
- Average home league attendance: 5,242

During the 1990–91 English football season, Preston North End F.C. competed in the Football League Third Division.

== Final league table ==
Pos	Team	Pld	W	D	L	GF	GA	GD	Pts
15	Reading	46	17	8	21	53	66	−13	59
16	Exeter City	46	16	9	21	58	52	+6	57
17	Preston North End	46	15	11	20	54	67	−13	56
18	Shrewsbury Town	46	14	10	22	61	68	−7	52
19	Chester City	46	14	9	23	46	58	−12	51

== Results ==
Preston North End's score comes first

=== Legend ===
Win	Draw	Loss

=== Football League Third Division ===
Date	Opponent	Venue	Result	Attendance	Scorers
25 August 1990	Grimsby Town	H	1-3	6,372	Joyce
01 September 1990	Reading	A	3-3	4,228	Joyce, Peel, Senior
08 September 1990	Tranmere Rovers	H	0-4	5,648	
14 September 1990	Southend United	A	2-3	4,614	Joyce, Thomas
18 September 1990	Bolton Wanderers	A	2-1	5,844	James, Bogie
22 September 1990	Fulham	H	1-0	4,691	Hughes
29 September 1990	Birmingham City	A	1-1	7,154	Bogie
02 October 1990	Brentford	H	1-1	5,025	Swann
06 October 1990	Exeter City	H	1-0	4,716	Bogie
13 October 1990	Mansfield Town	A	1-0	3,225	Rathbone
20 October 1990	Rotherham United	A	0-1	4,599	
23 October 1990	Chester City	H	0-0	5,465	
27 October 1990	AFC Bournemouth	H	0-0	4,953	
03 November 1990	Wigan Athletic	A	1-2	4,728	Greenwood
10 November 1990	Bradford City	A	1-2	7,440	Bogie
24 November 1990	Huddersfield Town	H	1-1	4,646	Joyce
01 December 1990	Shrewsbury Town	H	4-3	4,515	Bogie 2, Wrightson, Swann
15 December 1990	Leyton Orient	A	0-1	3,282	
22 December 1990	Stoke City	H	2-0	7,532	Swann 2
26 December 1990	Crewe Alexandra	A	2-2	4,405	Bogie, Shaw
29 December 1990	Bury	A	1-3	5,404	Mooney
01 January 1991	Cambridge United	H	0-2	5,256	
12 January 1991	Reading	H	1-2	4,470	Swann
19 January 1991	Grimsby Town	A	1-4	5,391	Mooney
26 January 1991	Southend United	H	2-1	4,351	Shaw, Wrightson
02 February 1991	Bolton Wanderers	H	1-2	9,844	Wrightson
05 February 1991	Fulham	A	0-1	2,750	
16 February 1991	Huddersfield Town	A	0-1	5,504	
23 February 1991	Bradford City	H	0-3	6,878	
02 March 1991	Shrewsbury Town	A	1-0	2,989	Shaw
09 March 1991	Leyton Orient	H	2-1	3,651	Shaw, Thompson
12 March 1991	Brentford	A	0-2	4,856	
16 March 1991	Birmingham City	H	2-0	5,334	Cartwright, Joyce
19 March 1991	Mansfield Town	H	3-1	3,245	Jepson, Joyce
23 March 1991	Exeter City	A	0-4	3,525	
26 March 1991	Swansea City	H	2-0	3,491	Shaw 2
30 March 1991	Crewe Alexandra	H	5-1	4,852	Joyce, Shaw, Bogie, Thompson, James
01 April 1991	Stoke City	A	1-0	11,524	Shaw 2
06 April 1991	Bury	H	1-1	5,641	Shaw 2
13 April 1991	Cambridge United	A	1-1	6,262	Joyce
16 April 1991	Swansea City	A	1-3	2,507	Senior
20 April 1991	Rotherham United	H	1-2	4,069	Flynn
27 April 1991	Chester City	A	1-1	1,351	Joyce
02 May 1991	AFC Bournemouth	A	0-0	7,064	
07 May 1991	Tranmere Rovers	A	1-2	6,006	Ashcroft
11 May 1991	Wigan Athletic	H	2-1	5,917	Jepson, Shaw

=== FA Cup ===
Round	Date	Opponent	Venue	Result	Attendance	Goalscorers
r1	17 November 1990	Mansfield Town	H	0-1	5,230	

=== League Cup ===
Round	Date	Opponent	Venue	Result	Attendance	Goalscorers
r1-1	28 August 1990	Chester City	H	2-0	3,503	Swann, Shaw
r1-2	04 September 1990	Chester City	A	1-5 (aet)	1,009	Swann

=== Football League Trophy ===
Round	Date	Opponent	Venue	Result	Attendance	Goalscorers
n.prg4	06 November 1990	Carlisle United	A	1-1	1,826	Shaw
n.prg4	27 November 1990	Rochdale	H	3-1	1,951	Joyce (2), Harper
n.r1	08 January 1991	Darlington	H	2-1 (aet)	2,418	Joyce, Swann
n.qf	29 January 1991	Scunthorpe United	A	4-1	2,155	Mooney (2), Shaw, Swann
n.sf	19 February 1991	Burnley	H	6-1	12,016	Jepson (3), Shaw (2), Ashcroft
n.fn-1	05 March 1991	Tranmere Rovers	A	0-4	8,633	
n.fn-2	09 April 1991	Tranmere Rovers	H	1-0	5,763	Jepson

== Statistics ==
=== Appearances and goals ===
No.	Pos	Nat	Player	Total		Division Three		FA Cup		EFL Cup		EFL Trophy	
No.	Pos	Nat	Player	Apps	Goals	Apps	Goals	Apps	Goals	Apps	Goals	Apps	Goals
	DF	(England) ENG	Adrian Hughes	32	1	25 + 1	1	1	0	0 + 1	0	4	0
	GK	(Republic of Ireland) IRL	Alan Kelly Jr.	27	0	23	0	1	0	0	0	3	0
	MF	(Republic of Ireland) IRL	Brian Mooney	11	4	9	2	0	0	0	0	2	2
	MF	(England) ENG	David Eaves	4	0	1 + 2	0	0	0	0	0	0 + 1	0
	MF	(England) ENG	David Thompson	24	2	21	2	0	0	0	0	3	0
	MF	(England) ENG	Gary Swann	39	9	30	5	1	0	2	2	6	2
	MF	(England) ENG	Graham Easter	4	0	1	0	0 + 1	0	0	0	1 + 1	0
	FW	(England) ENG	Graham Shaw	53	15	44	10	1	0	1	1	7	4
	DF	(England) ENG	Gregory Fee	17	0	15	0	0	0	0	0	2	0
	MF	(England) ENG	Ian Bogie	36	8	28 + 3	8	1	0	2	0	1 + 1	0
	MF	(England) ENG	Jason Kerfoot	1	0	0 + 1	0	0	0	0	0	0	0
	DF	(England) ENG	Jeff Wrightson	49	3	40	3	1	0	2	0	6	0
	FW	(England) ENG	John Thomas	7	1	5	1	0	0	2	0	0	0
	FW	(England) ENG	Lee Ashcroft	17	2	6 + 8	1	0	0	0	0	1 + 2	1
	MF	(England) ENG	Lee Cartwright	16	1	13 + 1	0	0	0	0	0	2	1
	DF	(England) ENG	Martin James	44	2	34 + 3	2	0	0	2	0	5	0
	DF	(England) ENG	Matthew Lambert	5	0	4 + 1	0	0	0	0	0	0	0
	DF	(England) ENG	Mick Rathbone	17	1	11 + 2	1	1	0	0	0	3	0
	DF	(England) ENG	Mike Flynn	44	1	33 + 2	1	1	0	2	0	6	0
	FW	(England) ENG	Nathan Peel	11	1	1 + 9	1	0	0	1	0	0	0
	DF	(England) ENG	Neil Williams	17	0	11 + 2	0	0	0	2	0	1 + 1	0
	FW	(England) ENG	Nigel Greenwood	8	1	3 + 2	1	1	0	0	0	1 + 1	0
	FW	(England) ENG	Ronnie Jepson	17	7	13 + 1	3	0	0	0	0	3	4
	GK	(England) ENG	Simon Farnworth	29	0	23	0	0	0	2	0	4	0
	DF	(England) ENG	Steve Senior	46	2	38	2	1	0	2	0	5	0
	DF	(England) ENG	Steven Greaves	2	0	2	0	0	0	0	0	0	0
	MF	(England) ENG	Steve Harper	43	1	27 + 9	0	0 + 1	0	0 + 1	0	4 + 1	1
	MF	(England) ENG	Warren Joyce	51	12	42	9	1	0	2	0	6	3
Player(s) who featured whilst on loan but returned to parent club during the season:
	DF	(England) ENG	Matthew Jackson	5	0	3 + 1	0	0	0	0	0	1	0

== Awards and Nominations ==
=== Club Awards ===
Award	Player	Notes	Ref.
Player of the Year	(England) Jeff Wrightson		
