= 1991–92 Preston North End F.C. season =

Preston North End's 1991-1992 season

Preston North End
1991–92 season
- Chairman: Keith W. Leeming
- Manager: Les Chapman
- Stadium: Deepdale
- Third Division: 17th
- FA Cup: Third round
- League Cup: First round
- Football League Trophy: First round
- Top goalscorer: League: Shaw (14); All: Shaw (17)
- Highest home attendance: 14,337 vs Sheffield Wednesday
- Lowest home attendance: 2,152 vs Hull City
- Average home league attendance: 4,729

During the 1991–92 English football season, Preston North End F.C. competed in the Football League Third Division.

== Final league table ==
Pos	Team	Pld	W	D	L	GF	GA	GD	Pts	Promotion or relegation
15	Wigan Athletic	46	15	14	17	58	64	−6	59	Qualification for the Second Division (Note: From the 1992–93 season, the second tier - then known as the Second Division - was renamed to the First Division, the third tier - then known as the Third Division - was renamed to the Second Division, and the fourth tier - then known as the Fourth Division - was renamed to the Third Division.)
16	Bradford City	46	13	19	14	62	61	+1	58	Qualification for the Second Division
17	Preston North End	46	15	12	19	61	72	−11	57	Qualification for the Second Division
18	Chester City	46	14	14	18	56	59	−3	56	Qualification for the Second Division
19	Swansea City	46	14	14	18	55	65	−10	56	Qualification for the Second Division

== Results ==
Preston North End's score comes first

=== Legend ===
Win	Draw	Loss

=== Football League Third Division ===
Date	Opponent	Venue	Result	Attendance	Scorers
17 August 1991	Peterborough United	A	0-1	6,036	
24 August 1991	Torquay United	H	3-0	3,654	Shaw, Ashcroft, Greenwood
30 August 1991	Stockport County	A	0-2	5,405	
03 September 1991	AFC Bournemouth	H	2-2	3,170	James, Greenwood
07 September 1991	Bradford City	H	1-1	4,160	Joyce
14 September 1991	Swansea City	A	2-2	3,170	Shaw 2
17 September 1991	Leyton Orient	A	0-0	3,296	
21 September 1991	Stoke City	H	2-2	6,345	Jepson, Swann
28 September 1991	Birmingham City	A	1-3	8,760	Shaw
01 October 1991	West Bromwich Albion	H	2-0	5,293	Swann, Senior
12 October 1991	Bury	A	3-2	4,625	Ashcroft, Greenwood, Shaw
19 October 1991	Huddersfield Town	H	1-0	6,866	James
26 October 1991	Fulham	A	0-1	4,022	
02 November 1991	Chester City	A	2-3	1,219	Shaw, Swann
05 November 1991	Wigan Athletic	H	3-0	3,657	Swann, Joyce 2
09 November 1991	Darlington	H	2-1	4,643	Thomas, Shaw
23 November 1991	Bolton Wanderers	A	0-1	7,033	
30 November 1991	Hull City	A	2-2	4,280	Thomas, Shaw
14 December 1991	Hartlepool United	H	1-4	5,032	Ashcroft
20 December 1991	Torquay United	A	0-1	2,183	
26 December 1991	Stockport County	H	3-2	6,782	Swann, Shaw, James
28 December 1991	Peterborough United	H	1-1	5,200	Cartwright
01 January 1992	AFC Bournemouth	A	0-1	5,508	
11 January 1992	Shrewsbury Town	A	0-2	3,154	
18 January 1992	Exeter City	H	1-3	3,585	Lambert
25 January 1992	Brentford	A	0-1	7,559	
01 February 1992	Huddersfield Town	A	2-1	6,700	Shaw, Cartwright
08 February 1992	Fulham	H	1-2	3,878	Johnrose
11 February 1992	Hull City	H	3-1	2,932	Williams, Jepson 2
15 February 1992	Hartlepool United	A	0-2	2,140	
22 February 1992	Shrewsbury Town	H	2-2	3,342	James, Wrightson
29 February 1992	Reading	A	2-2	3,390	Lambert, Shaw
03 March 1992	Exeter City	A	1-4	2,214	Ashcroft
07 March 1992	Brentford	H	3-2	3,548	Shaw, Thompson, Ashcroft
10 March 1992	Wigan Athletic	A	0-3	3,364	
14 March 1992	Chester City	H	0-3	3,909	
21 March 1992	Darlington	A	2-0	2,270	Jepson 2
28 March 1992	Bolton Wanderers	H	2-1	7,327	Joyce, Flynn
31 March 1992	Swansea City	H	1-1	3,367	Greenall
04 April 1992	Bradford City	A	1-1	6,044	Shaw
11 April 1992	Leyton Orient	H	2-1	3,926	Flynn, Howard (og)
14 April 1992	Reading	H	1-1	3,203	Cartwright
18 April 1992	Stoke City	A	1-2	16,151	Thompson
21 April 1992	Birmingham City	H	3-2	7,738	Cartwright, Flynn, Shaw
25 April 1992	West Bromwich Albion	A	0-3	11,318	
02 May 1992	Bury	H	2-0	6,932	Joyce, Finney

=== FA Cup ===
Round	Date	Opponent	Venue	Result	Attendance	Goalscorers
r1	27 November 1991	Mansfield Town	A	1-0	7,509	Thomas
r2	07 December 1991	Witton Albion	H	5-1	6,376	Senior, Swann, Flynn, Shaw, Greenwood
r3	04 January 1992	Sheffield Wednesday	H	0-2	14,337	

=== League Cup ===
Round	Date	Opponent	Venue	Result	Attendance	Goalscorers
r1-1	20 August 1991	Scarborough	H	5-4	2,683	Swann (2), Wrightson, Joyce, Shaw
r1-2	28 August 1991	Scarborough	A	1-3	2,085	Joyce

=== Football League Trophy ===
Round	Date	Opponent	Venue	Result	Attendance	Goalscorers
n.prg4	22 October 1991	Rochdale	A	1-1	1,255	Joyce
n.prg4	19 November 1991	Bolton Wanderers	H	2-1	2,709	Joyce, Thomas
n.r1	14 January 1992	Hull City	H	2-3 (aet)	2,152	Thomas, Ainsworth

== Statistics ==
=== Appearances and goals ===
No.	Pos	Nat	Player	Total		Division Three		FA Cup		EFL Cup		EFL Trophy	
No.	Pos	Nat	Player	Apps	Goals	Apps	Goals	Apps	Goals	Apps	Goals	Apps	Goals
	DF	(England) ENG	Adrian Hughes	17	0	14 + 1	0	1	0	0	0	1	0
	GK	(Republic of Ireland) IRL	Alan Kelly Jr.	27	0	23	0	2	0	0	0	2	0
	DF	(England) ENG	Colin Greenall	9	1	9	1	0	0	0	0	0	0
	MF	(England) ENG	David Christie	2	0	0 + 2	0	0	0	0	0	0	0
	MF	(England) ENG	David Thompson	28	2	18 + 7	2	0	0	1 + 1	0	0 + 1	0
	MF	(England) ENG	Gareth Ainsworth	6	1	2 + 3	0	0	0	0	0	1	1
	MF	(England) ENG	Gary Swann	37	8	28 + 1	5	3	1	2	2	3	0
	DF	(Wales) WAL	George Berry	6	0	4	0	0	0	1 + 1	0	0	0
	FW	(England) ENG	Graham Shaw	54	17	45 + 1	14	3	2	2	1	3	0
	MF	(England) ENG	Jason Kerfoot	4	0	0 + 3	0	0 + 1	0	0	0	0	0
	DF	(England) ENG	Jeff Wrightson	45	3	36 + 1	1	3	0	2	1	3	1
	FW	(England) ENG	John Thomas	17	5	8 + 3	2	3	1	0	0	3	2
	FW	(England) ENG	Lee Ashcroft	45	5	35 + 3	5	3	0	1	0	3	0
	MF	(England) ENG	Lee Cartwright	37	3	31 + 2	3	3	0	0	0	1	0
	MF	(England) ENG	Lenny Johnrose	3	1	1 + 2	1	0	0	0	0	0	0
	DF	(England) ENG	Martin James	40	4	36	4	2	0	0	0	2	0
	DF	(England) ENG	Matthew Lambert	12	2	7 + 4	2	0	0	0	0	0 + 1	0
	DF	(England) ENG	Mike Flynn	51	4	43	3	3	1	2	0	3	0
	DF	(England) ENG	Neil Williams	27	1	17 + 9	1	0	0	1	0	0	0
	FW	(England) ENG	Nigel Greenwood	21	4	16 + 4	3	0 + 1	1	0	0	0	0
	FW	(England) ENG	Ronnie Jepson	26	5	23 + 1	5	0	0	2	0	0	0
	GK	(England) ENG	Simon Farnworth	27	0	23	0	1	0	2	0	1	0
	MF	(England) ENG	Steve Finney	3	1	0 + 2	1	0	0	0	0	0 + 1	0
	DF	(England) ENG	Steve Senior	42	2	35	1	3	1	2	0	2	0
	DF	(England) ENG	Tim Allpress	12	0	7 + 2	0	2	0	0	0	1	0
	MF	(England) ENG	Warren Joyce	34	10	28 + 1	6	1	0	2	2	2	2
Player(s) who featured whilst on loan but returned to parent club during the season:
	DF	(England) ENG	Julian James	8	0	6	0	0	0	2	0	0	0
	MF	(England) ENG	Lenny Johnrose	3	1	1 + 2	1	0	0	0	0	0	0
	DF	(England) ENG	Neil Whitworth	6	0	6	0	0	0	0	0	0	0
	DF	(England) ENG	Paul Cross	6	0	5	0	0	0	0	0	1	0

== Awards and Nominations ==
=== Club Awards ===
Award	Player	Notes	Ref.
Player of the Year	(England) Lee Cartwright		
