= Gareth Ainsworth =

English footballer and manager (born 1973)

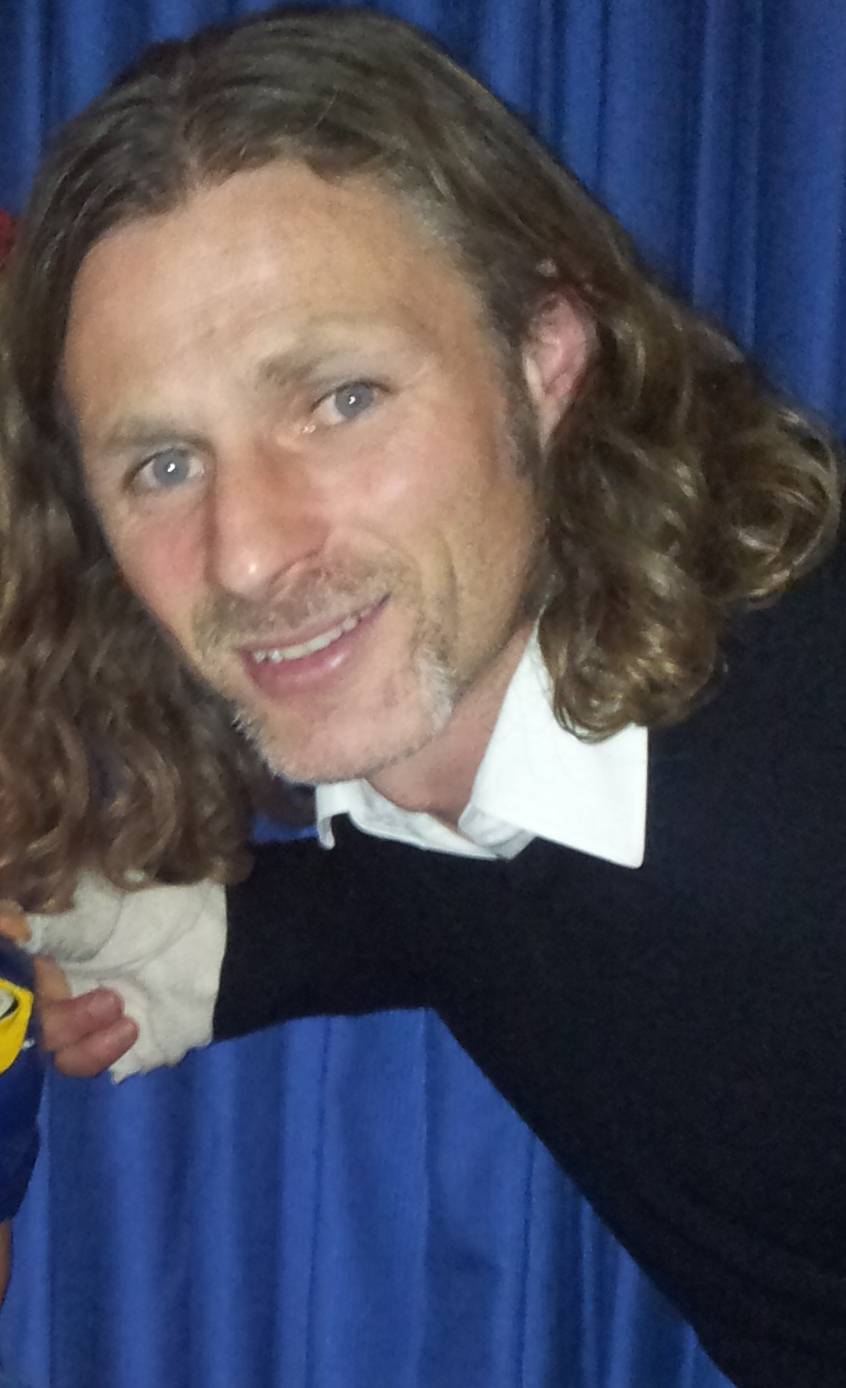
- Ainsworth in 2011

Personal information
- Full name: Gareth Ainsworth
- Date of birth: 10 May 1973 (age 53)
- Place of birth: Blackburn, Lancashire, England
- Height: 5 ft 10 in (1.78 m)
- Position: Midfielder

Team information
- Current team: Gillingham (manager)

Youth career
- 1989–1991: Blackburn Rovers

Senior career*
Years	Team	Apps	(Gls)
1991–1992	Northwich Victoria	14	(4)
1992	Preston North End	5	(0)
1992–1993	Cambridge United	4	(1)
1992–1993	→ Northwich Victoria (loan)	5	(0)
1993–1995	Preston North End	82	(14)
1995–1997	Lincoln City	83	(37)
1997–1998	Port Vale	55	(10)
1998–2003	Wimbledon	36	(6)
2002	→ Preston North End (loan)	5	(1)
2002–2003	→ Walsall (loan)	5	(1)
2003	Cardiff City	9	(0)
2003–2010	Queens Park Rangers	141	(21)
2009–2010	→ Wycombe Wanderers (loan)	2	(0)
2010–2013	Wycombe Wanderers	112	(16)
2014–2018	Wycombe Wanderers	0	(0)
2019–2020	Woodley United	3	(2)
Total		561	(113)

Managerial career
- 2008: Queens Park Rangers (caretaker)
- 2009: Queens Park Rangers (caretaker)
- 2012–2023: Wycombe Wanderers
- 2023: Queens Park Rangers
- 2024–2025: Shrewsbury Town
- 2025–: Gillingham
- * Club domestic league appearances and goals

Gareth Ainsworth (born 10 May 1973) is an English professional former player and football manager who is the manager of EFL League Two club Gillingham.

A former youth player at Blackburn Rovers, the midfielder, who was known for his crossing ability, moved to Preston North End in 1992 after impressing at non-League Northwich Victoria. He signed for Cambridge United, who in turn loaned him back to Northwich, and returned to Preston in 1993, establishing himself in the first-team during his second spell. He was sold to Lincoln City in 1995, where his performances earned him a place on the PFA Third Division Team of the Year in 1996–97, resulting in a £500,000 move to Port Vale. After being named the Port Vale F.C. Player of the Year in 1998, Ainsworth was sold to Premier League club Wimbledon for £2 million. Injuries at the club dogged him, and following loan spells with Preston and Walsall, he moved to Cardiff City in March 2003. He signed with Queens Park Rangers in June 2003, where he spent seven years. During his time at QPR, he helped the club to promotion from the Second Division in 2003–04, and twice served as caretaker manager.

Following a short loan period, he joined Wycombe Wanderers in February 2010. He was named in the PFA League Two Team of the Year in 2010–11, as Wycombe won promotion. After a short period as caretaker manager, he was appointed manager in November 2012. He retired from regular playing appearances to concentrate on management in April 2013 but remained registered as a player. He led the club to promotion from League Two at the end of the 2017–18 season and then from League One in 2020, securing a place in the Championship for the first time in the club's history. He left Wycombe in February 2023 to become head coach of QPR, where he would remain for eight months. He was appointed head coach at Shrewsbury Town in November 2024 and switched clubs to Gillingham after five months.

== Early life ==
Ainsworth was born in Blackburn, Lancashire. His mother worked as a professional singer during the 1960s, while his father worked several jobs, including as a bookmaker, a driving instructor and a factory clerk. His parents were avid music fans and his mother taught Ainsworth to sing as a child. He is a supporter of Blackburn Rovers and became a season ticket holder at the age of six. He attended St Augustine's Roman Catholic High School, Billington.

== Playing career ==
=== Early career ===
Ainsworth started his career as a trainee with Second Division club Blackburn Rovers. Despite forming a useful partnership with Peter Thorne, he was not offered professional terms at the end of his two-year training period. He had been hopeful of earning a professional contract but was informed of his release by manager Don Mackay on his 18th birthday. He later described his release from his hometown club as "devastating" and admitted walking into the car park at the ground and crying.

He dropped into the Football Conference with Northwich Victoria, scoring his first goal in the 3–1 home victory over Cheltenham Town on 26 October 1991. His form attracted the attention of Third Division club Preston North End and, in January 1992, they offered him a second chance at the professional game. Released at the end of the 1991–92 season, Ainsworth joined First Division Cambridge United under the management of John Beck. Ainsworth had a spell on loan with former club Northwich Victoria, making his second debut for the "Vics" in a 2–1 home victory over Bromsgrove Rovers on 5 September 1992. Cambridge sacked Beck in October 1992 but was swiftly appointed manager at Preston North End, and in December returned to the Abbey Ground to sign Ainsworth.

=== Preston North End ===
Ainsworth's second spell with Preston lasted three years. On 6 April 1993, he spent 13 minutes in goal after goalkeeper Simon Farnworth was knocked unconscious, Ainsworth conceded one goal as Preston played out a 2–2 at Port Vale. Preston reached the Third Division play-off final in 1994, and Ainsworth played in the Wembley final, but could not prevent Wycombe Wanderers winning the game 4–2. Preston reached the play-offs again the following year, but exited at the semi-final stage with a 2–0 aggregate defeat to Bury.

Beck left Preston following the disappointments at the play-offs, and was appointed manager at Third Division rivals Lincoln City.

=== Lincoln City ===
In October 1995, Beck signed Ainsworth for a third time, this time for a fee of £25,000. In 1996–97, Ainsworth scored 22 goals to make him the division's second-highest goalscorer after Wigan Athletic's Graeme Jones. For this achievement he was named on the PFA's Third Division Team of the Year. He won the club's Player of the Year award for both the 1995–96 and 1996–97 campaigns. A popular player at Sincil Bank, Ainsworth was voted fourth in the club's top 100 legends after a poll conducted in May 2007. He suited the long ball style at Lincoln and later said that "It was the club where I played my best football, probably of my whole career".

=== Port Vale ===
In September 1997, he signed for John Rudge's First Division Port Vale for a club record £500,000 fee; he was signed to replace Jon McCarthy and Steve Guppy, wingers who had been sold for a combined £2.35 million earlier in the year. He became the club's Player of the Year for his performances in the 1997–98 season, helping the "Valiants" to narrowly avoid relegation above Manchester City and local rivals Stoke City. He was though criticised for an 'ugly' tackle on Sheffield United's Dane Whitehouse in November that resulted in the player's early retirement due to a serious leg injury sustained from the challenge. The club turned down a £1 million bid from Leeds United in summer 1998. However, Vale chairman Bill Bell did later accept an offer from another club, reportedly behind Rudge's back, who was scouting in Sweden at the time.

=== Wimbledon ===
He moved to Premier League side Wimbledon in November 1998 for a £2 million fee, again a club record for Port Vale. His time at Wimbledon would be dominated by struggles against injury. He played eight times in the 1998–99 season, failing to score. He was limited to just two appearances in 1999–2000, though in the first of these, a 3–3 draw with Newcastle United at St James' Park, he scored two goals, including a last-minute equaliser. At the end of the season, the "Dons"' were relegated to the First Division.

He regained his fitness by January 2001 and managed twelve league and six FA Cup games in 2000–01. After missing the entire first half of the 2001–02 campaign, he returned to fitness only to find that he had lost his first-team place due to the form of promising youngster Jobi McAnuff. Ainsworth was told that he was to be released in summer 2002, and was allowed to join former club Preston North End on loan in April 2002. He played five games for Preston, scoring one goal against Coventry City. He returned to Wimbledon to find that he was to be offered a new contract after the club announced it was considering a potentially lucrative move to Milton Keynes.

After six appearances for the "Dons" in 2002–03, he was allowed to join Walsall on loan in December. He scored for the "Saddlers" against Nottingham Forest, but his loan deal was not extended. He scored twice in nine games upon his return to Wimbledon before March 2003, when he moved to Second Division club Cardiff City on a short-term deal for a "small fee". The "Bluebirds" won promotion to the First Division as play-off winners. However, Ainsworth played no part in the victory over Queens Park Rangers in the final at the Millennium Stadium. His stay with the club was brief, as manager Lennie Lawrence told him that he could not guarantee him a first-team spot. Both before and after his release from Cardiff he was linked with a permanent move back to Walsall, but manager Colin Lee had limited funds available for new players.

=== Queens Park Rangers ===
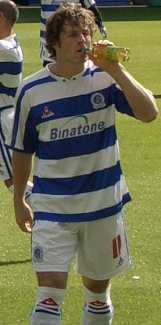
Ainsworth playing for Queens Park Rangers in 2005

Ainsworth signed for Second Division club Queens Park Rangers in July 2003. He scored twice on his debut, in a 5–0 win over Blackpool on 9 August 2003. He made it five goals in four games with a brace against Rushden & Diamonds 16 days later, one a volley from 35 yards (32 m), and another a powerful drive from the same distance. QPR won promotion to the First Division as Second Division runners-up at the end of the 2003–04 season.

Despite suffering a knee injury in 2004–05 that limited him to 23 appearances, manager Ian Holloway offered him a new contract at the end of the season after telling the media that "he's an important player to have around". During the disappointing campaign of 2005–06, Ainsworth came second in the Player of the Year awards behind Danny Shittu, and finished joint-top-scorer on eleven goals with Marc Nygaard.

During the 2006–07 season, Ainsworth struggled with injuries, and his season ended in April after a scan revealed that he had broken his leg in a win over Luton Town. During the 2007–08 season, he assisted new manager Luigi De Canio in addition to his 25 games, and stated his intention to move into coaching once his player career is over.

In May 2008, Ainsworth accepted a player-coach role under the new QPR boss Iain Dowie. Dowie was sacked in October 2008, and Ainsworth was appointed as caretaker manager. On taking up the reins, Ainsworth announced that "QPR is very strong with the result of what happened and will stay strong, nothing is going to break us". During his time in charge QPR managed to test Manchester United at Old Trafford in a League Cup encounter that was only settled by a 76th minute Carlos Tevez goal. This performance caused Ainsworth to believe that the club could achieve promotion to the Premier League. He remained on the club's coaching staff after Paulo Sousa was appointed as manager in November. Sousa's reign did not last long however, and on 9 April 2009, Ainsworth again took the role of caretaker manager.

He was considered for the vacant management position at former club Lincoln City in September 2009.

=== Wycombe Wanderers ===
On 20 November 2009, Ainsworth joined League One club Wycombe Wanderers on a month-long loan. He went on to sign an 18-month contract with Wycombe in February 2010. He scored his first goal for the club in a 2–2 draw with Exeter City on 20 March 2010. However, the club were relegated at the end of the season.

The club achieved promotion out of League Two at the first attempt in 2010–11, after finishing in the third automatic promotion spot, a single point ahead of Shrewsbury Town. Ainsworth scored eleven goals in 46 appearances, and captained Wycombe to the 3–1 victory over Southend United that ensured the club promotion on 7 May 2011. Later that month, Ainsworth signed a new one-year contract with the club. For his performances he was named on the PFA League Two Team of the Year. However, the "Chairboys" were relegated straight back down in 2011–12, with Ainsworth scoring twice in 32 games.

Ainsworth retired from professional football on 27 April 2013, after playing his final game against his former club, Port Vale, at Adams Park. However, he agreed to sign a two-year contract to remain as Wycombe manager. On 30 August 2016, Ainsworth came on as a substitute in the EFL Trophy against Northampton Town, and provided an assist for Garry Thompson in a 3–0 victory. Ainsworth later combined managerial duties at Wycombe with playing for Woodley United.

== Managerial career ==
=== Wycombe Wanderers ===
Following the dismissal of Gary Waddock, Ainsworth was appointed as Wycombe Wanderers's caretaker manager on 24 September 2012. Before he took charge, Wycombe had picked up just four points from their seven league games.

After a loss and a draw, he led the team to victory over Torquay United on 6 October, and provided the cross himself for the opening goal of the game. In October, he signed Portuguese winger Bruno Andrade on loan from QPR. A further win over Fleetwood Town, Andrade scoring the only goal of the game, lifted the club out of the relegation zone. Ainsworth was appointed as the club's manager on a permanent basis on 8 November. In December 2012, the "Chairboys" gained ten out of a possible 15 points to rise ten points clear of the relegation zone – Ainsworth was recognised for this achievement by being nominated for the division's manager of the month award. In April 2013, Ainsworth signed a new two-year managerial contract, and also announced his retirement as a player.

Ainsworth lost striker Joel Grant to Championship club Yeovil Town at the start of the 2013–14 season, and signed attackers Jon-Paul Pittman, Steven Craig, and Paris Cowan-Hall to replace him. Defenders Dave Winfield and Charles Dunne also left Wycombe for clubs in higher divisions (though Dunne was loaned back to Wycombe for the season as part of the transfer). He signed right-back Nick Arnold and midfielder Billy Knott on loan. In the January transfer window he sold 18-year-old centre-back Kortney Hause to Wolverhampton Wanderers, and signed 19-year-old former Arsenal winger Anthony Jeffrey on a free transfer. Wycombe ended an eight-match run without a win with a 1–0 victory over league leaders Chesterfield on 22 February, earning Ainsworth a mention as the Football League manager of the week. On the final day of the season Wycombe needed to win at Torquay United and hope results went their way elsewhere to stay up; they won their match 3–0 and finished outside of the relegation zone on goal difference.

He completely restructured the defence with free signings in preparation for the 2014–15 season, bringing in Joe Jacobson, Peter Murphy, Sido Jombati, and Aaron Pierre, whilst also bringing in striker Paul Hayes from Scunthorpe United. He was named as Football League manager of the week after Wycombe reached the top of the table with a 1–0 home win over Hartlepool United on 3 January. He won the League Two Manager of the Month award for March 2015 after Wycombe picked up 14 points in six tough unbeaten games. Hayes finished as top-scorer as Wycombe went on to end the campaign in fourth place, one point behind automatically promoted Bury. They reached the play-off final at Wembley Stadium, where they lost out on penalties to Southend United following a 1–1 draw. Ainsworth signed a new five-and-a-half-year contract in January 2015 and was named as that season's LMA Manager of the Year for League Two.

Wycombe finished the 2015–16 season in 13th place. Ainsworth admitted that the club was in a precarious financial position despite taking Premier League club Aston Villa to a replay in the third round of the FA Cup. He won the League Two Manager of the Month award for a second time having guided the team from 21st to sixth-place with four successive victories and only one goal conceded in November 2016. Ainsworth was named as the EFL's manager of the week on 3 January 2017 after his side recorded two consecutive victories to begin the year fifth in the table. Wanderers ended the 2016–17 season in ninth place, one point and two places outside of the play-offs. They also enjoyed more cup runs, exiting the FA Cup at the fourth round with a 4–3 defeat to Tottenham Hotspur at White Hart Lane and losing 2–1 at Coventry City in the semi-finals of the EFL Trophy. He won League Two's Manager of the Month award for January 2018 after having led his side to four wins in four games. The following month, he was named as EFL manager of the week after making a triple substitution with his team down to ten men and trailing 3–2 to Carlisle United, which inspired his team to turn the game around and make an "extraordinary triumph" to win 4–3.

In an interview later that month, Ainsworth stated that the set-up at the club was a "very unique model of just the first team but it works", as his team of mainly older veteran players were in the top two of League Two despite operating without an academy, reserve team or goalkeeping coach. He was named as the EFL's manager of the week after overseeing a 2–1 win at Chesterfield in the last week of April despite his team initially going one goal down away from home. Wycombe ended the 2017–18 season in the third automatic promotion spot, leaving Ainsworth to state that "For us and Accrington to be in the top three this season, it's turned the finances of this league on its head". In June 2018, Gareth Ainsworth extended his contract by another three years to remain as Wycombe boss.

He was reportedly on the manager shortlist at his former club, Queens Park Rangers, in April 2019. Wycombe ended the 2018–19 season in 17th-place, three points clear of the relegation zone. He was permitted to speak with divisional rivals Sunderland and was also linked with a move to Millwall in October 2019, but remained at Wycombe, stating that it would take "something special" for him to leave. He was named as the League One Manager of the Month for November 2019 after his team picked up ten points from four games without conceding a goal. He signed another new contract in February 2020, which was described simply as "long-term". The 2019–20 season was ended early due to the COVID-19 pandemic in England, though Wycombe qualified for the play-offs in third-place after the table was concluded on points per game basis. Wycombe eliminated Fleetwood Town in the semi-finals and recorded a 2–1 victory over Oxford United in the final itself to secure a place in the Championship for the first time in the club's history. The play-offs were behind closed doors due to the pandemic, and Ainsworth credited Wycombe's success to the noise and support created by the club's substitutes, support staff and directors.

Wycombe took their fight against to avoid relegation out of the Championship until the last day of the 2020–21 season, and were relegated in 22nd-place despite beating Middlesbrough 3–0 on the final day of the campaign; Ainsworth stated that "It might seem a strange thing to say because we've been relegated, but finishing third from bottom in the Championship is one of the proudest moments in my career". He was linked with the vacant management position at former club Preston North End.

Ainsworth won the League One Manager of the Month award for April 2022 after his team picked up 17 points and scored 13 goals from seven games. Wycombe finished sixth in League One at the end of the 2021–22 season and qualified for the play-offs, advancing past Milton Keynes Dons with a 2–1 aggregate victory in the semi-finals. He admitted that his side were underdogs for the final against Sunderland in what would also be Adebayo Akinfenwa last game as a professional. Sunderland won the match 2–0, but Ainsworth said he was proud of his players and said "I think the quality today told, just in the final third [it] just escaped them today". After the end of the 2021–22 season, Ainsworth was heavily linked to a move to former side Queens Park Rangers, but instead signed a contract extension with Wycombe.

=== Queens Park Rangers ===
On 21 February 2023, Ainsworth was appointed as Queens Park Rangers head coach on a three-and-a-half-year deal. QPR ended the 2022–23 Championship season in 20th-place. He spoke of wanting "big changes" at the club in the summer and signing "pacy forward players" who could fit into his "very up and at 'em" style of play. Later that year, on 28 October, Ainsworth was dismissed from his position following a 2–1 home loss against Leicester City – the club's sixth consecutive defeat, as QPR sat second-to-last in the league table after 14 matches during the 2023–24 season.

=== Shrewsbury Town ===
On 13 November 2024, Ainsworth was appointed head coach of Shrewsbury Town, at the time bottom of League One. He won five and lost 12 of his 22 games in charge as the Shrews remained bottom of the division and 14 points short of safety with nine games left to play of the 2024–25 season, leaving the club despite being offered a two-year contract extension.

=== Gillingham ===
On 25 March 2025, Ainsworth was appointed as the manager of 19th-placed League Two club Gillingham. As both promotion and relegation seemed unlikely, he took the opportunity to evaluate the squad with nine games left of the 2024–25 season.

Having finished the previous season strongly, fourteen points from an unbeaten first six matches of the 2025–26 season saw Ainsworth named League Two Manager of the Month for August. He helped lead the Gills to the club's longest ever unbeaten run of 21 league games on 20 September against Newport County. On 28 September, it was announced that Ainsworth would undergo cardiac surgery following a League Managers Association health check in May and as a result would miss several Gillingham matches. Assistant manager Richard Dobson took temporary charge of the team during his absence. Ainsworth's first game back after the surgery was a 1–0 away win against Bristol Rovers on 8 November, where he watched from the commentary gantry. He later admitted that he had returned to the action too soon and said he wanted a "big summer recruitment wise" after Gillingham again finished in the bottom half of the table.

Ainsworth signed what BBC Sport described as "key ins" with Liam Gordon, James Brophy, Will Goodwin and Ollie Wright (on loan) in the summer of 2026, in addition to January arrival Ronan Hale. He was nominated for September's League Two Manager of the Month award after the Gills scored ten goals and acquired ten points from five league games in September.

== Style of play ==
Ainsworth was able to play on the right wing or as an attacking midfielder and had good crossing ability; he was also known as a pacey player in his 20s and early 30s. Port Vale manager John Rudge said that Ainsworth "wasn't a typical winger. He was very strong and powerful as well as really quick. It wasn't the full backs tackling him, he would tackle them!" In December 2025, Port Vale supporters voted him onto the all-time Port Vale XI.

== Management style ==
Ainsworth is an attack-minded manager and prefers his teams to play aggressively, with a high-pressing style. He has specialised in building teams on a tight budget, recruiting older players overlooked by others due to their age and status as "has-beens".

== Personal life ==
During his playing days Ainsworth picked up the nickname "Wild Thing" due to his appearance and his rock star ambitions; he was in a band called APA with Wimbledon teammates Chris Perry and Trond Andersen. He later joined the band Dog Chewed the Handle, named after a Terrorvision song, after answering an advert in Loot. Before the audition, Ainsworth hid his footballing career from his bandmates until he had been accepted. The band were invited to support Bad Manners on tour but rejected the offer due to clashes with Ainsworth's footballing career. The band later split, with Ainsworth and another member forming a new band, Road to Eden. By November 2019, he was fronting The Cold Blooded Hearts. They released their debut album in July 2023, produced by Yes keyboardist Geoff Downes.

He is considered a cult hero at Preston, Wimbledon, QPR, Port Vale, Lincoln City, and Wycombe Wanderers.

On 21 October 2010, he represented the English Football League at the unveiling of the Footballers' Battalions memorial on the site of the Battle of the Somme. He graduated from the University of Liverpool with a Diploma in Professional Studies in Football Management in December 2019.

Ainsworth is married to Donna, who is from Venezuela. He has three children. He is a practising Catholic. His son, Kane, played non-League football.

== Career statistics ==
Appearances and goals by club, season and competition
Club	Season	League			FA Cup		League Cup		Other		Total	
Club	Season	Division	Apps	Goals	Apps	Goals	Apps	Goals	Apps	Goals	Apps	Goals
Northwich Victoria	1991–92	Football Conference	14	4	0	0	—		0	0	14	4
Preston North End	1991–92	Third Division	5	0	—		—		1 (Note: Appearance(s) in Football League Trophy)	1	6	1
Cambridge United	1992–93	Division One	4	1	—		1	0	0	0	5	1
Northwich Victoria (loan)	1992–93	Football Conference	5	0	0	0	—		—		5	0
Preston North End	1992–93	Division Two	26	0	—		—		1	0	27	0
Preston North End	1993–94	Division Three	38	13	3	0	2	0	6 (Note: Three appearances one goal in Football League Trophy; three appearances in Division Three play-offs)	1	49	14
Preston North End	1994–95	Division Three	16	1	1	0	1	0	2 (Note: One appearance in Football League Trophy; one appearances in Division Three play-offs)	0	20	1
Preston North End	1995–96	Division Three	2	0	—		2	0	0	0	4	0
Preston North End	Total		82	14	4	0	5	0	9	1	100	15
Lincoln City	1995–96	Division Three	31	12	1	0	—		3	1	35	13
Lincoln City	1996–97	Division Three	46	22	1	0	6	2	1	0	54	24
Lincoln City	1997–98	Division Three	6	3	—		2	1	—		8	4
Lincoln City	Total		83	37	2	0	8	3	4	1	97	41
Port Vale	1997–98	Division One	40	5	2	0	—		—		42	5
Port Vale	1998–99	Division One	15	5	—		2	1	—		17	6
Port Vale	Total		55	10	2	0	2	1	0	0	59	11
Wimbledon	1998–99	Premier League	8	0	0	0	—		—		8	0
Wimbledon	1999–2000	Premier League	2	2	0	0	0	0	—		2	2
Wimbledon	2000–01	Division One	12	2	6	1	0	0	—		18	3
Wimbledon	2001–02	Division One	2	0	0	0	0	0	—		2	0
Wimbledon	2002–03	Division One	12	2	1	0	2	0	—		15	2
Wimbledon	Total		36	6	7	1	2	0	0	0	45	7
Preston North End (loan)	2001–02	Division One	5	1	—		—		—		5	1
Walsall (loan)	2002–03	Division One	5	1	0	0	—		—		5	1
Cardiff City	2002–03	Division Two	9	0	—		—		0	0	9	0
Queens Park Rangers	2003–04	Division Two	29	6	1	0	3	1	2	0	35	7
Queens Park Rangers	2004–05	Championship	22	2	1	0	0	0	—		23	2
Queens Park Rangers	2005–06	Championship	43	9	1	0	0	0	—		44	9
Queens Park Rangers	2006–07	Championship	22	1	1	0	0	0	—		23	1
Queens Park Rangers	2007–08	Championship	24	3	1	0	0	0	—		25	3
Queens Park Rangers	2008–09	Championship	0	0	0	0	0	0	—		0	0
Queens Park Rangers	2009–10	Championship	1	0	—		1	0	—		2	0
Queens Park Rangers	Total		141	21	5	0	4	1	2	0	152	22
Wycombe Wanderers	2009–10 (Note: Part of this season was spent on loan from Queens Park Rangers)	League One	14	2	—		—		—		14	2
Wycombe Wanderers	2010–11	League Two	43	10	3	1	0	0	0	0	46	11
Wycombe Wanderers	2011–12	League One	32	2	0	0	0	0	0	0	32	2
Wycombe Wanderers	2012–13	League Two	25	2	0	0	0	0	0	0	25	2
Wycombe Wanderers	2016–17	League Two	0	0	0	0	0	0	1	0	1	0
Wycombe Wanderers	2017–18	League Two	0	0	0	0	0	0	0	0	0	0
Wycombe Wanderers	Total		114	16	3	1	0	0	1	0	118	17
Woodley United	2019–20	Hellenic League; Division One East	3	2	—		—		1 (Note: Appearance in Hellenic League Floodlit Cup)	0	4	2
Career total			561	113	23	2	22	5	18	3	624	123

== Managerial statistics ==
As of match played 21 November 2026

Managerial record by team and tenure
Team	From	To	Record					Ref.
Team	From	To	P	W	D	L	Win %	Ref.
Queens Park Rangers (caretaker)	24 October 2008	19 November 2008	6	2	1	3	33.3	
Queens Park Rangers (caretaker)	9 April 2009	3 May 2009	5	1	1	3	20.0	
Wycombe Wanderers	24 September 2012	21 February 2023	550	219	137	194	39.8	
Queens Park Rangers	21 February 2023	28 October 2023	28	5	4	19	17.9	
Shrewsbury Town	13 November 2024	25 March 2025	22	5	5	12	22.7	
Gillingham	25 March 2025	Present	81	24	28	29	29.6	
Total			692	256	176	260	37.0	

== Honours ==
=== As a player ===
Queens Park Rangers

- Football League Second Division second-place promotion: 2003–04

Wycombe Wanderers

- Football League Two third-place promotion: 2010–11

Individual

- Lincoln City Player of the Year: 1995–96, 1996–97
- PFA Team of the Year: 1996–97 Third Division, 2010–11 League Two
- Port Vale Player of the Year: 1997–98

=== As a manager ===
Wycombe Wanderers

- EFL League One play-offs: 2020
- EFL League Two third-place promotion: 2017–18

Individual

- LMA Football League Two Manager of the Year: 2014–15
- EFL League One Manager of the Month: November 2019, April 2022
- EFL League Two Manager of the Month: March 2015, November 2016, January 2018, August 2025
