= Nebbeling =

Nebbeling is a surname. Notable people with the surname include:

- Gavin Nebbeling (born 1963), South African footballer
- Ted Nebbeling (1943/44–2009), Canadian politician
