= Ryan Kidd =

English footballer (born 1971)

Personal information
- Full name: Ryan Andrew Kidd
- Date of birth: 6 October 1971 (age 55)
- Place of birth: Radcliffe, Greater Manchester, England
- Height: 6 ft 1 in (1.85 m)
- Position: Defender

Team information
- Current team: Blackburn Rovers (Under 18s Assistant Coach)

Youth career
- Port Vale

Senior career*
Years	Team	Apps	(Gls)
1990–1992	Port Vale	1	(0)
1992–2002	Preston North End	259	(9)
Total		260	(9)

Managerial career
- 2010: Darlington
- 2016: Bury (joint-caretaker)
- * Club domestic league appearances and goals

Ryan Andrew Kidd (born 6 October 1971) is an English former footballer who is a youth-team coach at Blackburn Rovers.

A defender, he left Port Vale in 1992 and then spent ten years with Preston North End before retiring from the game at age 30 due to injury. During his time at the club, Preston won promotion as Third Division champions in 1995–96 and Second Division champions in 1999–2000; and were one game away from promotion to the Premier League in 2001. He turned to coaching once his playing days finished and was briefly the manager of Darlington in June 2010. He went on to coach at Bury and was temporarily appointed joint caretaker manager (with Chris Brass) in November 2016.

== Playing career ==
=== Port Vale ===
Kidd graduated through the Port Vale youth team to sign his first professional forms under John Rudge in July 1990. He made one league start and three cup appearances as a substitute in the 1991–92 season, but was given a free transfer in May 1992 and moved on to Les Chapman's Preston North End, also of the Second Division.

=== Preston North End ===
The "Lilywhites" were relegated into the Third Division (fourth tier) under new manager John Beck in 1992–93; they occupied the final relegation place having finished three points below Hull City. Preston then finished fifth in 1993–94, and reached the Wembley play-off final, where they lost out 4–2 to Wycombe Wanderers. They again finished fifth in 1994–95, with the help of young Manchester United loanee David Beckham, but missed out on the 1995 play-off final after they lost out to Bury at the semi-final stage. North End achieved promotion at the third time, winning the Third Division title in 1995–96 by a three-point margin, under Gary Peters' stewardship.

Kidd was a key first-team member in 1996–97, making 40 appearances as Preston retained their third-tier status. They achieved another comfortable mid-table in 1997–98, and Kidd played 44 games, scoring in wins over Wigan Athletic and Luton Town, and retaining his first-team place under teammate turned manager David Moyes. For the third time in Kidd's Preston career, the Deepdale club reached the play-offs in 1998–99 following a fifth-place finish; however, they missed the play-off final with Manchester City after losing out to Gillingham at the semi-final stage. Kidd had played 33 games throughout the campaign, scoring at Wrexham and in both games against Chesterfield. Preston continued to progress and won promotion as champions in 1999–2000, finishing seven points ahead of second-place Burnley; Kidd played a total of 38 games.

He played just 15 First Division games in 2000–01 after recovering from serious neck surgery. He played every minute of the three play-off games. Preston progressed past Birmingham City following a penalty shoot-out. Still, they were denied a place in the Premier League after a 3–0 defeat to Bolton Wanderers in the final at the Millennium Stadium. He was limited to just seven appearances in 2001–02, before he was forced to retire in November 2001, after suffering a serious neck injury (a collapsed disc meant he could not safely head the ball again). For his ten years service and more than 300 league and cup appearances for the "Lilywhites", Kidd was granted a testimonial match in summer 2002 against Kevin Keegan's Manchester City.

"He has played a big part in the team for the last 10 years and I hope that after this disappointment he will get a good turn-out for his testimonial because he has been such a good servant."

— Preston boss David Moyes on Kidd's retirement.

== Coaching career ==
Kidd joined Barnsley in January 2006, where he was the assistant to manager Simon Davey as the club reached the FA Cup semi-finals at Wembley in 2008, having knocked out Liverpool at Anfield, then beating Chelsea at home in the quarter-finals. Previously he had gained his coaching and managerial experiences working as Development Centre Manager and under-18 team coach at Preston North End, before taking up the offer of Centre of Excellence Manager at Bury. He left Barnsley in September 2009 after almost three years, following the sacking of Simon Davey.

In March 2010, Davey and Kidd again teamed up to take over at League Two side Darlington. Davey resigned after just eleven weeks, and on 17 June 2010 Kidd took over as manager of Darlington. He signed a two-year contract, however, he lasted just eleven days, resigning on 28 June without taking charge of a first-team game and making no signings, after he had second thoughts about the job. On 21 December 2011, Kidd was named as assistant to Rochdale's caretaker manager Chris Beech. He later began coaching the under-16s at the Blackpool academy.

In February 2014, Kidd was appointed as the under-18's manager at Bury. Kidd and Chris Brass took charge of the club as joint caretaker managers following the sacking of David Flitcroft in November 2016, and were given the task of managing the club for the rest of the 2016–17 season. The club lost all four games before Brass was given the job on a full-time basis, with Kidd being appointed as his assistant. He remained at Gigg Lane under three different managers since Brass left in February 2017, and served the club as the youth-team manager in the 2018–19 season, working with Mark Litherland. Following the demise of Bury, Kidd moved on to become the under-18 assistant coach at Blackburn Rovers in October 2019. He was promoted to Under-18s lead coach in September 2021.

== Personal life ==
As of November 2016, Kidd was married to Mirinda, with whom he had two sons.

== Career statistics ==
=== Playing statistics ===
Appearances and goals by club, season and competition
Club	Season	League			FA Cup		Other		Total	
Club	Season	Division	Apps	Goals	Apps	Goals	Apps	Goals	Apps	Goals
Port Vale	1991–92	Second Division	1	0	0	0	3	0	4	0
Preston North End	1992–93	Second Division	15	0	0	0	0	0	15	0
Preston North End	1993–94	Third Division	36	1	4	0	6	0	46	1
Preston North End	1994–95	Third Division	32	3	0	0	5	0	37	3
Preston North End	1995–96	Third Division	30	0	1	0	5	2	36	2
Preston North End	1996–97	Second Division	35	0	2	0	5	0	42	0
Preston North End	1997–98	Second Division	33	2	4	0	7	0	44	2
Preston North End	1998–99	Second Division	28	3	3	0	2	0	33	3
Preston North End	1999–2000	Second Division	29	0	3	0	6	0	38	0
Preston North End	2000–01	First Division	15	0	1	0	5	0	20	0
Preston North End	2001–02	First Division	6	0	0	0	1	0	7	0
Preston North End	Total		259	9	18	0	42	2	319	11
Career total			260	9	18	0	45	2	323	11

== Honours ==
Preston North End

- Football League Second Division: 1999–2000
- Football League Third Division: 1995–96
