= Masefield =

Masefield may refer to:

Places

- Masefield, Saskatchewan

People

- John Masefield (1878-1967), English poet
- Paul Masefield (b. 1970), English footballer
