= Chris Brass =

English footballer (born 1975)

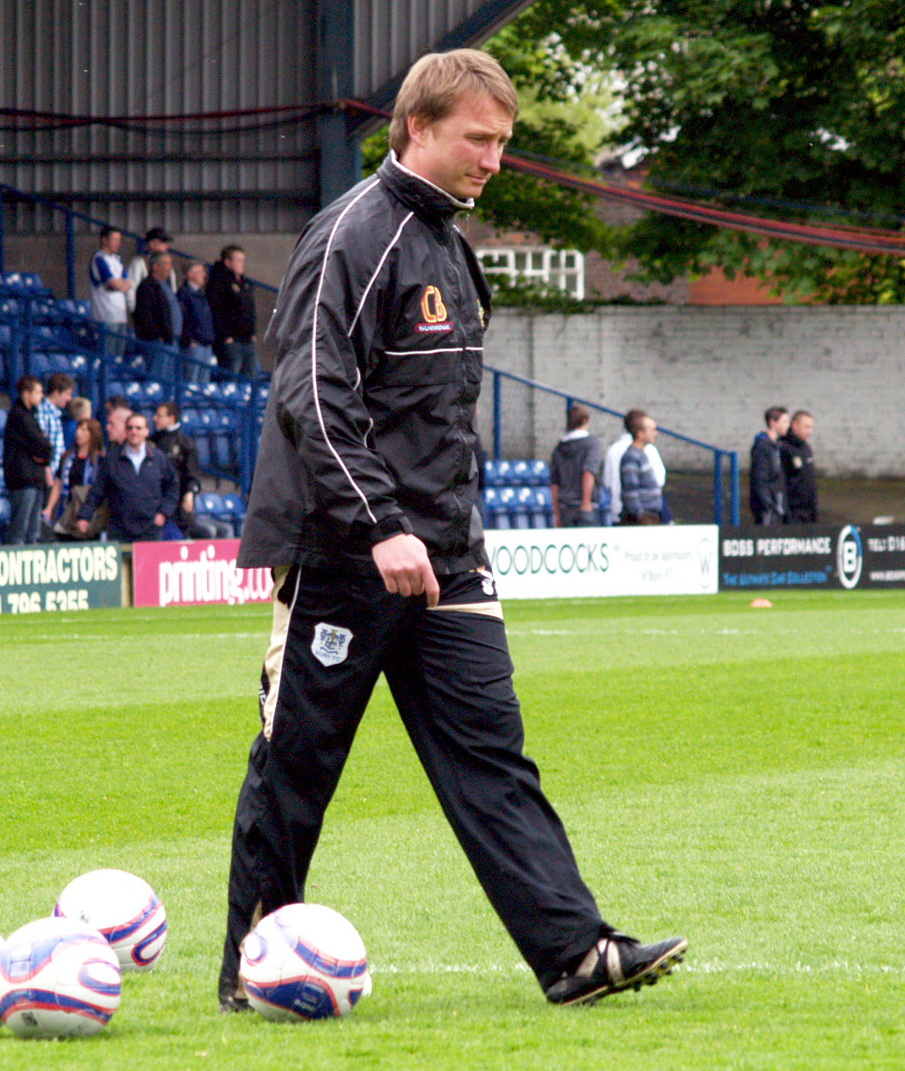
- Brass as Bury assistant manager in 2009

Personal information
- Full name: Christopher Paul Brass
- Date of birth: 24 July 1975 (age 51)
- Place of birth: Easington, England
- Height: 5 ft 9 in (1.75 m)
- Position: Defender

Team information
- Current team: Nottingham Forest (senior recruitment manager)

Youth career
- Ipswich Town
- –1993: Burnley

Senior career*
Years	Team	Apps	(Gls)
1993–2001	Burnley	134	(1)
1994	→ Torquay United (loan)	7	(0)
2000	→ Halifax Town (loan)	6	(0)
2001–2006	York City	152	(6)
2005	→ Harrogate Town (loan)	9	(0)
2005–2006	→ Southport (loan)	5	(0)
2006–2007	Bury	29	(0)
2007–2009	Hyde United	52	(0)
Total		394	(7)

Managerial career
- 2003–2004: York City
- 2008: Bury (caretaker)
- 2016–2017: Bury
- * Club domestic league appearances and goals

Christopher Paul Brass (born 24 July 1975) is an English football manager and former professional player who works in a senior recruitment role at Premier League club Nottingham Forest in a role across The Academy and First Team.

As a player, he was a defender in the Football League for Burnley, Torquay United, Halifax Town, York City and Bury. He also played non-league football for Harrogate Town, Southport and Hyde United. Between 2003 and 2004 at the age of 27 he was player-manager of York, he did not return to management until 12 years later when he returned to Bury as manager. He has also worked on the coaching staff at Scunthorpe United, Torquay United and Wigan Athletic.

== Playing career ==
=== Early career ===
Born in Easington, County Durham, Brass began his career as a schoolboy at Ipswich Town before progressing through the youth system at Burnley as a trainee, where he turned professional on 8 July 1993.

=== Burnley ===
In 1994, Brass captained the Burnley A team as it won the Lancashire League. In need of first team experience, he joined Torquay United on loan in October 1994, playing seven league games in a two-month loan spell.

Brass returned to Burnley, making his debut for them as a substitute in a 1–0 defeat away to Portsmouth, in January 1995. The following season, he again struggled to claim a regular place, but in the 1996–97 season established himself in the centre of the Burnley defence, and remained there for the next three seasons, though occasionally played out of position by manager Chris Waddle.

By March 1998, such was the turmoil that the Clarets found themselves in, Brass was their longest serving player, and still only 22 years old. In that summer, Stan Ternent replaced Waddle, and made Brass captain, but the latter struggled to keep his form and found himself in the reserves. In the summer of 1999, Burnley signed Mitchell Thomas, resulting in Brass playing only occasionally for the first team. He went on a one-month loan to Halifax Town in September 2000, with the first of his six league games being a win against Torquay. After the loan was up, Halifax could not afford to sign him and he returned to the Burnley reserves, before joining York City on a free transfer in March 2001. He had played 134 league games for Burnley, scoring once, ironically against York City.

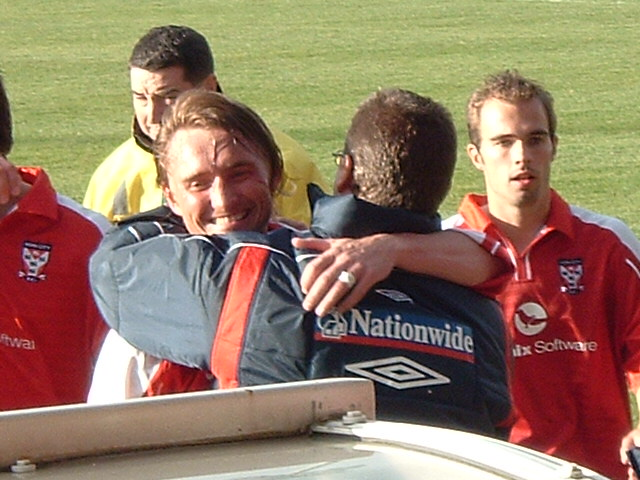
Brass hugs Viv Busby after a win for York City in 2004

=== York City ===
Brass was immediately installed as captain at York and on 4 June 2003, aged only 27, was appointed as York's player-manager. Although his first season in charge began well, York failed to win any of their final 20 league games and were relegated to the Football Conference. Results were not much better in the Conference and Brass was sacked as manager in November 2004. He remained at York as a player and, after suffering a serious ligament injury, joined Harrogate Town on loan in September 2005 in an attempt to regain match-fitness. He finished the loan with 11 appearances. He joined Southport on a one-month loan in November 2005, which was extended for another month in January 2006. He returned to York in January after making five appearances and on 12 January was released by the club after a settlement was reached over the remainder of his contract.

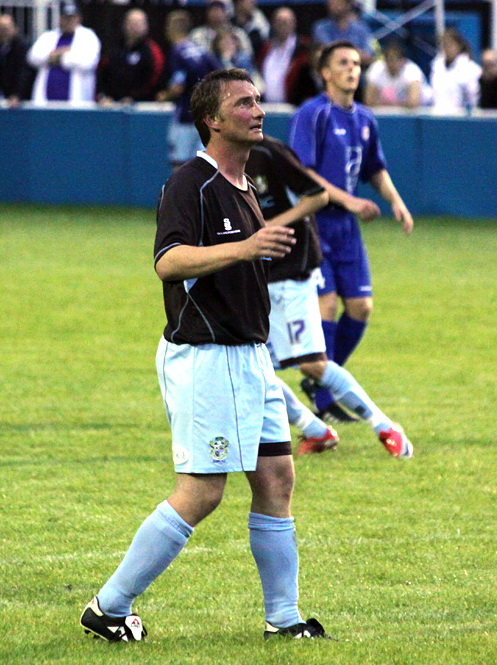
Brass playing for Bury in 2009

=== Bury ===
He joined League Two club Bury on a contract until the end of the 2005–06 season on 17 January. He scored a notable own goal, when attempting an overhead clearance in the game against Darlington, kicking the ball into his nose and subsequently the net. Brass nearly received a broken nose to add to the humiliation. This incident was voted the number one incident in magazine FourFourTwo's "It shouldn't happen to a footballer". Bury subsequently won the game 3–2 and the result meant the club had avoided relegation. In an interview with The Athletic in May 2021, Brass revealed that the own goal had been a blessing in disguise. He said "I heard the crunch of bones and thought, 'I've broken my nose again. [...] The thing is, I actually ended up doing myself a favour. Due to the previous breaks, I'd lost cartilage and been told a few times I needed an operation to clear my airways. But the impact straightened it up, cleared my airways — happy days. It saved me some money on cosmetic surgery." Brass also stated that he used his gaffe as inspiration for players that he's coached saying "I have actually used it as an example to young players — that they will make mistakes. I tell them, 'If I can make a mistake of that magnitude, it shows the importance of playing to the whistle; plus, don't let it affect your performance'."

He signed a new one-year contract with Bury in June 2006, being released at the end of the 2006–07 season, but was asked to return to pre-season training to prove his fitness before a decision could be made on his future.

== Coaching career ==
Brass was appointed as Bury's Centre of Excellence manager on 6 July 2007, before combining this role with playing for Hyde United after signing in July 2007 following a successful trial. He became Bury's caretaker manager on 15 January 2008, following the sacking of Chris Casper, and remained in post until the appointment of Alan Knill on 4 February 2008. Brass left Hyde having made 62 appearances after being appointed assistant manager to Knill on 22 January 2009. When Knill was appointed Scunthorpe United manager on 31 March 2011, Brass followed him as assistant manager. After Knill was dismissed by Scunthorpe United he followed Knill to Torquay United where Knill was appointed as manager on an interim basis until the end of the season. Knill and Brass ensured Torquay United's Football League safety. He was appointed on a permanent basis, along with Knill, following the end of the season. On 18 December 2013, Bury appointed Brass as assistant manager, to work alongside manager David Flitcroft. In June 2015 Brass was appointed Head of Football Operations. On 16 November 2016, Brass and Ryan Kidd took over as caretaker managers, following the sacking of David Flitcroft.

On 15 December 2016, Brass was named the head coach of Bury until the end of 2016–17 season, but on 15 February 2017, Brass was replaced by Lee Clark.

In October 2018, he moved to Wigan Athletic to take up the role of Head of Football Operations

== Managerial statistics ==
As of 15 February 2017

Managerial record by team and tenure
Team	From	To	Record					Ref
Team	From	To	P	W	D	L	Win %	Ref
York City	4 June 2003	8 November 2004	67	14	18	35	20.9	
Bury (caretaker)	15 January 2008	4 February 2008	5	1	1	3	20.0	
Bury	16 November 2016	15 February 2017	15	2	5	8	13.3	
Total			87	17	24	46	19.5	—
