= Liam Watson (footballer) =

English footballer and manager

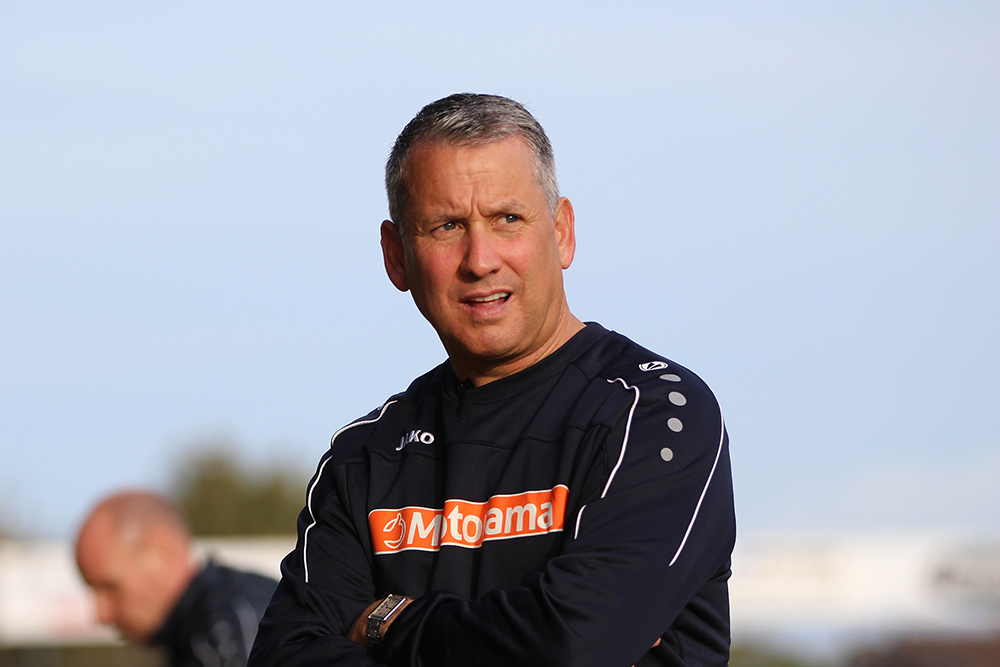
- Watson with Southport in 2019

Personal information
- Date of birth: 21 May 1970 (age 56)
- Place of birth: Liverpool, England
- Position: Striker

Team information
- Current team: Southport (Director)

Senior career*
Years	Team	Apps	(Gls)
1988–1989	Maghull		
1989–1991	Burscough		
1991–1992	Warrington		
1992–1994	Preston North End		
1994–1997	Marine		
1997–1998	Witton Albion		
1998–1999	Runcorn		
1999–2000	Accrington Stanley		
2000–2003	Runcorn		

International career
- England Semi-Pro

Managerial career
- 2000–2003: Runcorn
- 2003–2006: Southport
- 2006–2008: Burscough
- 2008–2013: Southport
- 2013–2014: AFC Telford United
- 2015–2016: Stalybridge Celtic
- 2017: Southport (caretaker)
- 2018–2023: Southport
- * Club domestic league appearances and goals

Liam Watson (born 21 May 1970) is an English former professional footballer and current club director of Southport Football Club.

== Playing career ==
=== Professional career ===
Having plied his trade at Maghull and Burscough, Watson finally made his mark at Warrington Town where John Beck signed him for Preston North End for a fee of £60,000. This smashed Warrington Town's transfer fee received record which had only been set a few weeks earlier when Neil Whalley also moved to Deepdale for just £25,000. He scored in his début after replacing the injured Micky Norbury in a 5–2 win over Rotherham United on 27 March 1993 and then netted again in his next two appearances against Port Vale and Huddersfield Town. They would turn out to be the only three goals he would score for Preston but went on to make six more appearances before a serious injury cut short his professional footballing career.

=== Semi-professional career ===
Due to his injury Watson retired from professional football and returned to non-league. The first side to sign him on his return was Marine before moving on to Witton Albion and then eventually Runcorn. Watson was soon signed from Runcorn by John Coleman for a short stint at ambitious Accrington Stanley before returning to the newly renamed Runcorn F.C. Halton in a managerial capacity replacing Mark Carter.

== Managerial career ==
=== Runcorn FC Halton ===
In September 2000, Watson, at the relatively young age of 29, became Runcorn's new manager in the Northern Premier League. With little budget Watson was forced to scour the reserves of local non-league teams with a bulk of his signings coming from Southport, who he would later go on to manage. After three relatively successful years at Runcorn, in October 2003 Watson replaced Mike Walsh as manager of Southport and became the youngest manager in their history at the age of 33.

=== Southport ===
One of Watson's first moves at Southport was to oversee a large turn around of players. Out went players such as Peter Wright, Mark Byrne and Andy Whittaker and among the influx of players was Neil Robinson, who went on to score 15 goals in 15 games on loan from Macclesfield Town, Steve Daly, Chris Price and Kevin Leadbetter all followed Watson from Runcorn while young starlet Carl Baker was signed from Prescot Cables. This saw a remarkable turn around of fortunes, with Southport languishing in mid-table and struggling to qualify for the newly formed Conference North when he took over, Watson oversaw a climb up the table with some impressive performances along the way to finish the season in 6th place and qualify for Conference North football the following season.

At the start of the 2004–05 season Watson began undertaking another squad re-build which saw Neil Robinson return to the club permanently along with Earl Davis who had previously been on loan from Burnley. He signed Terry Fearns from nearby Vauxhall Motors who would later go on to score 41 goals in all competitions that season. That season Southport became the inaugural champions of the Conference North, pipping Droylsden to the title on the last day with a 5–2 victory away at Harrogate Town while they slipped up away at Worksop Town.

The 2005–06 season was always going to be a struggle being one of the only part-time teams in the league however against all odds Watson kept Southport up, securing them their status as a Conference National team with Steve Pickford scoring a vital goal in a 1–1 draw away from home at Grays Athletic.

During the pre-season of 2004–05 chairman Charlie Clapham announced Southport would be going full-time as they looked to move forward in the league, that was a move that would see Watson leave his post as Southport manager, due to him unable to go full-time as he already held down a full-time job at Ashworth Hospital. He did however make one full-time signing and that was of Gary Brabin, who himself left soon after Watson. He was not without a job long however and dropped down a league to local rivals Burscough who had been taken over by ambitious local businessman Chris Lloyd.

=== Burscough ===
In June 2006, Watson was announced as the new manager of Burscough, replacing former Southport player Derek Goulding.

With a lot of the players not accepting full-time terms under Southport's new manager Paul Cook the majority of the players followed Watson to Burscough signing on part-time.

Watson's first season in charge at Victoria Park happened to be their most successful in history. With the majority of the squad having promotion winning experiences at Southport they proved to be no pushovers, dropping down a league and winning the Northern Premier League on the final day of the 2006/07 season with a 2–1 victory over AFC Telford United, in front of 5710 fans at the New Bucks Head. In the same season, Burscough also won the Peter Swailes Memorial Shield and for the first time in 40 years the Lancashire Junior Cup.

For the 2007–08 season, Burscough found themselves for the first time playing Conference North football, just one league below the Conference, equalling the highest ever level they have played at. After starting the season badly, with an injury ravished squad, they finished the season in a credible eighth place just outside the play-off positions.

On 27 June 2008, came a shock as Watson announced he was resigning from his post with immediate effect, only to announce three days later he was taking up the now vacant role back at Southport.

=== Return to Southport ===
On 30 June 2008, it was announced at 1pm in an official press conference held by the Southport board of directors that Watson would be returning to Southport filling the vacancy left when Gary Brabin departed to Cambridge United. Watson was to be assisted by John Doolan, who was initially Brabin's assistant, with former Southport player Chris Price also following from Burscough.

Watson's first signing for Southport was striker Ciaran Kilheeney from Burscough followed shortly by nine others; Adam Flynn, Shaun Gray, Tony McMillan, Alan Moogan and Craig Noone along with former Southport players James Connolly, Earl Davis, Matty McGinn, and Steve Daly.

In his first season back at Southport, Watson oversaw a strong title challenge but fell short and ultimately lost to Gateshead in the play-off semi finals. This was also capped with some impressive performances in the Liverpool Senior Cup reaching the semi-finals, while reaching the quarter-finals in the FA Trophy, Setanta Shield and the Lancashire Junior Cup.

In the 2009–10 season, Watson guided Southport back to the Conference Premier as champions with a win on the last day of the season away at Eastwood Town. This was his third title in 5 years with two different clubs, and his second Conference North title. Watson is the only manager to have won this title twice, as are Southport. Watson also oversaw Southport progress to the final of the Lancashire FA Challenge Trophy where they beat Clitheroe at the Reebok Stadium, making it the third occasion in 5 years he has won the trophy and making him the most successful manager in the trophies recent history.

Watson suffered his first relegation as a manager in the 2010–11 season, as Southport finished 21st in the Conference Premier. Southport however were saved from the drop following the demise of Rushden and Diamonds, and continued to compete at the top level of non-league football. Watson took full advantage of the second chance, Southport finishing the season in 7th place in 2011–12. The club remained around the play-off places the entire season, Watson managing the team to a record breaking 8 consecutive away wins, culminating in a 1–0 win against Stockport County at Edgeley Park on 26 November 2011 and top the season off by winning the Non League Manager of the Year award.

On 17 April 2013 it was announced that Watson would be leaving Southport once again, but on more amiable terms, stating at the time: "I feel it right that both the club and myself move on from here".

=== AFC Telford United ===
Only weeks after announcing he would leave Southport at the end of the season, he immediately became favourite to become new manager of relegated side AFC Telford United. On the Friday 3 May 2013 it was announced that Liam would become the club's fifth boss of 2013, with Dominic Morley as his assistant manager. In his first season as manager, he won the Conference North title.

Watson and Morley won the Conference North title first time round in the 2013/14 season; the first title for 62 years; also reaching the second round of the FA Cup for the first time in AFC Telford's history. However, after a poor run to the 2014/15 season the board of AFC Telford announced on 14 December 2014 that Watson and assistant Dom Morley have been relieved from their duties.

=== Stalybridge Celtic ===
On 20 March 2015, Watson signed a contract until April 2017 at Stalybridge Celtic.

On 31 August 2016, after a poor start to the season Watson resigned as manager and director of Stalybridge. Stating at the time "you will never see me in the dug out again, I am retiring from management".

=== Away from management ===
On 6 September 2016, Watson was announced as returning to Southport for the third time but in a new capacity. Watson joined the board of directors, along with local businessmen Nigel Allen and David Barron, to take up the newly created role as Operations Director. He then took interim charge at the club after the sacking of Steve Burr for a single game away at Gateshead, a match Southport lost 3-0. Watson left Southport in May 2017 following the club's relegation. Following this he had a brief spell scouting for Scunthorpe United.

=== Further return to Southport ===
Watson was appointed manager of Southport on 7 May 2018 for his third spell with the club in this role. He managed his 500th league game for the club on 12 October 2019 in a 1-0 home win against Brackley Town.

On 17 August 2023, a restructuring of the club's management structure saw Watson leave as manager in order to fully focus on his role as Club Director.

== Managerial statistics ==
All competitive league games (league and domestic cup) and international matches are included.

As of 15 August 2023

Team	Nat	Year	Record				
Team	Nat	Year	G	W	D	L	Win %
Runcorn FC Halton	(England)	2000–2003	149	57	35	57	38.26
Southport	(England)	2003–2006	146	64	32	50	43.84
Burscough	(England)	2006–2008	91	45	20	26	49.45
Southport	(England)	2008–2013	276	120	73	83	43.48
AFC Telford United	(England)	2013–2014	70	29	16	25	41.43
Stalybridge Celtic	(England)	2015–2016	67	24	16	27	35.82
Southport (caretaker)	(England)	2017	1	0	0	1	0.00
Southport	(England)	2018–2023	210	71	57	82	33.81
Career Total			1,003	408	248	347	40.68

== Honours ==
=== Managerial ===
Southport

- Conference North: 2004–05, 2009–10
- Lancashire Junior Cup: 2005-06, 2009-10, 2018-19, 2021-22, 2022-23
- Liverpool Senior Cup: 2011–12, 2018–19

Burscough

- Northern Premier League: 2006–07
- Lancashire Junior Cup: 2006–07

Telford

- Conference North: 2013–14
- Shropshire Senior Cup: 2013–14

=== Individual ===
Southport

- Non League Manager of the Year: 2011–12

== Personal life ==
Outside of football, Watson previously worked at Ashworth Hospital alongside two of his former assistants, Chris Price and the man who replaced him at Burscough, Joey Dunn.
