= Martin James (English footballer) =

English footballer

Personal information
- Full name: Martin Joseph James
- Date of birth: 18 May 1971 (age 55)
- Place of birth: Formby, England
- Positions: Defender; midfielder

Youth career
- 1987–1989: Preston North End

Senior career*
| Years | Team | Apps | (Gls) |
| 1989–1993 | Preston North End | 98 | (11) |
| 1993–1994 | Stockport County | 32 | (0) |
| 1994–1997 | Rotherham United | 43 | (0) |
| 1997–1998 | Accrington Stanley | | |
| 1998–2000 | Leigh RMI | | |
| | Total | 173 | (11 ) |
- * Club domestic league appearances and goals

Martin James (born 18 May 1971) is an English former professional footballer.

== Preston North End ==
Martin joined Preston as an apprentice in July 1987, turning pro two years later. He was, along with Lee Cartwright, Lee Ashcroft and Adrian Hughes, a product of the Preston North End youth system of the late 1980s. A left sided defender or midfielder, James made his Preston debut in August 1990 in a 2–0 win over Chester City at Deepdale. He went on to play 41 games, scoring twice, for the Lilywhites in his first season in the first team.

For the next two years Martin became a regular fixture in the PNE first XI, becoming a firm favourite on the Deepdale terraces with his forays down the left wing. The team however were beginning to struggle and when in September 1992 manager Les Chapman was sacked Martin's future became uncertain. New manager John Beck however reassured Martin that his future with the club was safe but this promise was short lived when in March 1993 after 117 games and 11 goals for Preston he was sold to Stockport County for a fee of £50k. Indeed, Preston selling off their prize assets was becoming something of a habit for just a week later teammate Mike Flynn was also sold to County for a fee of £150k.

== Stockport and Rotherham ==
Unlike Flynn however who enjoys near legendary status at Stockport Martin's stay at Edgeley Park was short lived. Indeed, his stay there lasted little under eighteen months before they too decided to cash in by selling him to Rotherham United again for £50k. During James time at County he had played 37 games without scoring and over half of his appearances were as a substitute. His stay at Millmoor was however a disappointment with Martin struggling with injury and loss of form. In three years with The Millers he played just 47 games ( 0 goals) before they in turn decided to release him at the end of his contract in May 1997. At the age of just 26 and after 201 games and 11 goals Martin found himself on the soccer scrapheap.

== Non-league and Retirement ==
At first Martin moved into non-league football, first with Accrington Stanley then of the Northern Premier League and then with similarly placed clubs Leigh RMI and Bradford Park Avenue.
