= Graham Easter =

English footballer (born 1969)

Personal information
- Date of birth: 26 September 1969 (age 57)
- Position: Winger

Youth career
- Huddersfield Town

Senior career*
Years	Team	Apps	(Gls)
1989–1990	Crewe Alexandra	3	(0)
1990–1991	Preston North End	1	(0)
1992	Jerv		
1993	Northwich Victoria		
1993	Fram Larvik		(12)
1993–1996	Viborg	15	(0)
- * Club domestic league appearances and goals

Graham Easter (born 26 September 1969) is an English former professional footballer who played as a winger.

== Career ==
Easter spent his early career in England with Huddersfield Town, Crewe Alexandra and Preston North End.

In 1992 he played for FK Jerv in Norway. After Jerv's manager Ole Skouboe moved on to IF Fram Larvik following the 1992 season, Easter signed for Fram as well. However, he would spend the Norwegian winter break back in England with Northwich Victoria; Easter also had to wait several months for a work permit. He arrived in Larvik in April 1993. Having scored 12 goals, Easter moved on to Viborg FF in Denmark after the Norwegian season ended.

He became assistant coach of FC Svendborg in 2009.
