= Mike Conroy (footballer, born 1965) =

Scottish footballer

Personal information
- Full name: Michael Kevin Conroy
- Date of birth: 31 December 1965 (age 60)
- Place of birth: Glasgow, Scotland
- Position: Striker

Senior career*
Years	Team	Apps	(Gls)
1983–1984	Coventry City	0	(0)
1984–1987	Clydebank	114	(38)
1987–1988	St Mirren	10	(1)
1988–1991	Reading	80	(7)
1991–1993	Burnley	77	(30)
1993–1995	Preston North End	57	(22)
1995–1998	Fulham	94	(32)
1998–1999	Blackpool	14	(0)
1998–1999	→ Chester City (loan)	10	(3)
1999	→ Chester City (loan)	5	(0)
1999–2000	Carlton	28	(0)
2000–2001	Eastern Pride	6	(1)
Total		495	(134)
- * Club domestic league appearances and goals

Michael Kevin Conroy (born 31 December 1965) is a Scottish former professional footballer. He played as a striker.

Conroy began his career with Coventry City in 1983. Unable to break into the first team, he moved back to his native Scotland in 1984 to sign with Clydebank on a free transfer. In three years with the Bankies, he made 114 league appearances and scored 38 goals. In 1987, he joined St Mirren for ten months, scoring one goal in ten appearances for the Buddies.

He returned south of the border in 1988 to join Reading in a £50,000 deal. He spent three years at Elm Park, before moving to Burnley in 1991, where the most prolific scoring period of his career would begin. In his two years with Burnley, Conroy scored 30 goals in 77 league appearances. Conroy joined Burnley's Lancashire rivals Preston North End in 1993 for £85,000. He went on to score 22 goals in 57 appearances for North End and briefly played alongside a young David Beckham.

In 1995, he joined Fulham, and scored 32 goals in almost 100 appearances for the Craven Cottage club. After three years in London, Conroy moved back to Lancashire to join Blackpool for a £50,000 fee. He made fourteen appearances for the Seasiders but failed to find the net in the league (though he did score once against Scunthorpe United in the League Cup). In December 1998 he was loaned out to Chester City, for whom he scored three goals in ten appearances. He returned to the Blues, again on loan, a month after his first period expired.

After leaving Blackpool in 1999, Conroy moved to Australia to play for Carlton. In 2000, he joined Eastern Pride, with whom he finished his playing career when they went out of business the following year. Conroy was senior coach at Doncaster Rovers Soccer Club in the Victorian State League Division 2. He began his coaching career as reserve-team coach at Doncaster Rovers.

== Honours ==
Burnley

- Football League Fourth Division: 1991–92

Individual

- PFA Team of the Year: 1996–97 Third Division
