= Jeff Wrightson =

English footballer (born 1968)

Personal information
- Full name: Jeffrey George Wrightson
- Date of birth: 18 May 1968 (age 58)
- Place of birth: Newcastle upon Tyne, England
- Position: Defender

Youth career
- Wallsend Boys Club
- 1984–1986: Newcastle United

Senior career*
Years	Team	Apps	(Gls)
1986–1987	Newcastle United	4	(0)
1987–1992	Preston North End	166	(4)
1992–1997	Gateshead	186	(1)
- Yeovil Town
- Spennymoor United
- Blyth Spartans

Managerial career
- 2007–2010: Gateshead (assistant)
- * Club domestic league appearances and goals

Jeffrey George "Jeff" Wrightson (born 18 May 1968) is an English former footballer who made 170 appearances in the Football League playing as a defender for Newcastle United and Preston North End. He went on to play for a number of non-League clubs, in particular Gateshead where he made more than 200 appearances and where from 2007 to 2010 he was assistant manager.

== Career ==
Wrightson was born in Newcastle upon Tyne. He began his football career as a member of Wallsend Boys Club, then signed apprentice forms with his hometown club Newcastle United when he left school in 1984. He played alongside future England international Paul Gascoigne in the Newcastle youth team that won the 1985 FA Youth Cup. Wrightson played four games in the Football League First Division before being released at the end of the 1986–87 season.

Wrightson joined Preston North End, newly promoted to the Third Division and managed by former Newcastle United defender John McGrath. Used mainly as a substitute in his first few months with the club, he played more regularly later in the season and helped the club to a mid-table position. The following season, Preston adopted a three-man defensive line, with Wrightson playing alongside Bob Atkins and Adrian Hughes; they reached the end-of-season playoffs only to lose to eventual winners Port Vale.

Wrightson won the club's Player of the Year award in the 1990–91 season, but was released at the end of the next season after turning down the offer of a new two-year contract. He had scored five goals from nearly 200 games in all competitions. After an unsuccessful trial with Blackpool he returned to his native north-east, where he signed for non-league Gateshead. In five seasons with the club he made a total of 226 appearances, before enjoying spells with Yeovil Town, Spennymoor United and Blyth Spartans.

He coached juniors at Walker Central BC for three years, before returning to Gateshead in May 2007 as assistant to former Newcastle and Preston teammate Ian Bogie, newly appointed as first team manager. In 2008 they led the club to promotion to the Conference North, and promotion to the Conference National the following season. Wrightson left Gateshead after the 2009–10 season, as he was unable to commit to a full-time role for the following season.

== Personal life ==
His son Kieran played youth and reserve football for Newcastle United and currently plays Non-League football for North Shields F.C.
