= Steve Senior =

English footballer

Personal information
- Full name: Stephen Senior
- Date of birth: 15 May 1963 (age 63)
- Place of birth: Sheffield, England
- Height: 5 ft 8 in (1.73 m)
- Position: Right-back

Senior career*
Years	Team	Apps	(Gls)
1980–1987	York City	168	(10)
1984–1985	→ Darlington (loan)	5	(0)
1987–1988	Northampton Town	4	(0)
1987–1990	Wigan Athletic	109	(3)
1990–1992	Preston North End	73	(3)
1992–1994	Witton Albion	62	(3)
- * Club domestic league appearances and goals

Stephen Senior (born 15 May 1963) is an English former professional footballer who played as a defender in the Football League for York City, Darlington, Northampton Town, Wigan Athletic and Preston North End.

== Career ==
Born in Sheffield, West Riding of Yorkshire, Senior started his career at York City, where he was part of the team that were promoted from the Fourth Division in the 1983–84 season. In 1987, he moved to Northampton Town for a fee of £14,000. He went on to play for Wigan Athletic and Preston North End. Towards the end of his career, he also played for Bamber Bridge.

As of 2009, he owns a brick paving business in his hometown Sheffield.

== Honours ==
York City

- Football League Fourth Division: 1983–84
