= Neil Whalley =

English footballer

Personal information
- Full name: David Neil Whalley
- Date of birth: 29 October 1965 (age 60)
- Place of birth: Widnes, England
- Position: Midfielder

Senior career*
Years	Team	Apps	(Gls)
- Warrington Town
1993–1995	Preston North End	50	(1)
- Altrincham
- Runcorn
- Droylsden
- * Club domestic league appearances and goals

David Neil Whalley (born 29 October 1965) is an English former professional footballer who played as a midfielder. Although most of his career was played in non-league football, he played 50 matches in the Football League for Preston North End.

His son Shaun also plays in the Football League for Accrington Stanley.
