= Paul Masefield =

English footballer (born 1970)

Personal information
- Full name: Paul Darren Masefield
- Date of birth: 21 October 1970 (age 56)
- Place of birth: Lichfield, England
- Height: 5 ft 11 in (1.80 m)
- Position: Right back

Youth career
- 1986: Southampton

Senior career*
Years	Team	Apps	(Gls)
1989–1991	Birmingham City	0	(0)
1991	Preston North End	0	(0)
1991–1992	Cheltenham Town	7	(0)
1992	Exeter City	1	(0)
1992	Bromsgrove Rovers	12	(0)
1992–1993	Stockport County	7	(0)
1993	Doncaster Rovers	9	(0)
1993–1994	Preston North End	6	(0)
1994	Bromsgrove Rovers	14	(0)
1994	Limerick	?	(?)
1994–1998	Sing Tao Sports Club	?	(6)
1998	Jurong	?	(0)
1999	Clementi Khalsa	?	(1)
1999	Tanjong Pagar United	?	(0)
2000	Jurong	9	(1)

International career
??	Hong Kong League All-Stars	–	(–)
- * Club domestic league appearances and goals

Paul Darren Masefield (born 21 October 1970) is an English former football right back and TV pundit who played professional football in England for a number of years before moving to Asia and playing in local Asian leagues.

== Club career ==
Masefield started his career in the youth ranks alongside Alan Shearer at Southampton. However, he signed his first professional contract with Birmingham City and in spite of being with the club for four years (including a year with the first team), he never made a first team appearance. After brief spells with Cheltenham Town and Exeter City (on a non-contract basis), he then moved to Stockport County and Doncaster Rovers, for whom he played seven and nine matches respectively. He then played six games for Preston North End alongside future Everton manager David Moyes. He had brief spells at Bromsgrove Rovers and Limerick, with whom he was player-coach between September and November 1994.

He then moved to Hong Kong, where he played for the Sing Tao Sports Club, as well as for a Hong Kong league All-Star team and although he never represented the official Hong Kong national side, he did take on the likes of Sampdoria, Inter Milan and the Yugoslavian national side in unofficial matches. He finished off his career by playing professional football in Singapore with clubs such as Jurong, Balestier Khalsa and Tanjong Pagar United.

== Post-retirement career ==
Masefield owns a company, Little League Malaysia that runs a coaching school for children, which attracts as many as 3000 subjects per year. He has coached Singapore Cricket Club in the second tier of Singaporean football, and is also a pundit on the ESPN Star Sports coverage of the English Premier League. He also features in Indian Super League Star Sports post coverage.

Masefield provided host broadcast commentary for the 2019 AFC Asian Cup.

Masefield currently working as an anchor in a show Football United for Indian Super League and a commentator in Indian Super League for season 2023–24 & Kalinga Super Cup 2024.

== Personal life ==
Masefield lives in India with his wife Stephanie and children.
