= Tony Ellis =

English footballer (born 1964)

Personal information
- Full name: Anthony Joseph Ellis
- Date of birth: 20 October 1964 (age 62)
- Place of birth: Salford, England
- Position: Striker

Youth career
- Barr Hill
- 19??–1985: Northwich Victoria
- 1985–1986: Horwich RMI

Senior career*
Years	Team	Apps	(Gls)
1986–1987	Oldham Athletic	8	(0)
1987–1989	Preston North End	86	(27)
1989–1992	Stoke City	77	(19)
1992–1994	Preston North End	72	(48)
1994–1997	Blackpool	147	(55)
1997–1999	Bury	38	(12)
1999	Stockport County	21	(6)
1999–2001	Rochdale	59	(17)
2001–2002	Burnley	10	(1)
2002–2003	Leigh RMI		
2003	Mossley	6	(4)
2003–2005	Hyde United	33	(3)
- * Club domestic league appearances and goals

Anthony Joseph Ellis (born 20 October 1964) is an English former professional footballer who commanded combined transfer fees of nearly £750,000 and scored 180 league goals in 517 league games during a sixteen-year Football League career. He is currently the head of North Academy Recruitment at Wolverhampton Wanderers.

== Playing career ==
=== Oldham Athletic and Preston North End ===
Born in Salford, Lancashire, Ellis began his playing career in local and non-league football, with Horwich RMI and Northwich Victoria and Poets F.C. in the Salford Sunday League. In August 1986 at the age of 21, Ellis was signed by Joe Royle for Oldham Athletic, for whom he played ten games. Ellis was spotted by Preston North End manager John McGrath scoring goals for Oldham's reserve team. McGrath paid £23,000 in October 1987 to take Ellis to Deepdale, where he scored a last-minute winner on his debut against Port Vale. In his first spell at Deepdale Ellis scored 32 goals in 106 games in a little over two seasons.

=== Stoke City ===
In 1989 Alan Ball at Stoke City tabled a £250,000 offer for Ellis. For Preston, the money was too good to turn down, and Ellis found himself leaving for the Victoria Ground in December 1989. His time at Stoke was disrupted by injury and the emergence of both Wayne Biggins and Mark Stein as first choice strikers. However in two and a half years he scored 20 goals in 93 first-team appearances and was a regular scorer for the City reserve team that won the Central League division two titles in 1991-92.

=== Back at Preston ===
In August 1992 Preston resigned Ellis, paying Stoke £50,000 plus striker Graham Shaw. Stoke valued Ellis at £250,000 while Preston valued Shaw at £200,000. This deal therefore meant that Ellis became Preston's record signing at the time. His second spell at Preston was even more productive than his first: Ellis scored 56 goals in just 88 games and was named the club's official player of the year in 1992/93 and 1993/94. His final game for the Lilywhites was their 1994 play-off final defeat against Wycombe Wanderers at Wembley. In his two spells at Preston, Ellis scored 88 goals in 194 games.

=== Blackpool ===
In 1994, after a much-publicised fall out with Preston boss John Beck over a new contract, Ellis signed for arch-rivals Blackpool for £165,000. In November 1995, Ellis handed in a transfer request, fuelling rumours of a return to Deepdale, by then managed by Gary Peters. Blackpool got around this problem by offering Ellis an extension to his contract. In three and a half years at Bloomfield Road, Ellis scored 65 goals in 173 games, and was the leading goalscorer for each of his three seasons at the club. One of his strike partners, Andy Preece, included Ellis in his all-time XI in 2021. The duo also played together at Bury.

=== Latter career ===
In December 1997, Ellis was on the move again, this time to Bury for £70,000. He scored twelve goals in 38 games at Gigg Lane. Then in 1999 he joined Stockport County for a fee of £25,000. He made 21 league appearances, scoring six goals before joining Rochdale on a free transfer later that year where he made a total of 68 appearances and scored 18 goals.

He was released by Rochdale at the end of the 2000–01 season, and found himself without a club, with semi-retirement and a return to non-league football looking likely until Burnley boss Stan Ternent offered him a lifeline. In his only season at Turf Moor, Ellis played ten games, all as a substitute. At the age of 37 he scored the winner against Bradford City in a 3–2 win at Valley Parade, his only goal for the club. During his Football League career Ellis had scored 205 goals in 612 first team games.

=== Non-League ===
After leaving Burnley at the end of the 2001–02 season, Ellis joined Football Conference side Leigh RMI in August 2002. In 2003, he joined Northern Premier League side Mossley.

In 2003–04 he became player/assistant manager of Conference North club Hyde United and also took on the role of coaching the Burnley under-15s at the Turf Moor club's Centre of Excellence.

== Coaching career ==
In July 2007, Ellis left his position as assistant manager of Hyde United and coach of the youth teams at Turf Moor to join former teammate, Rochdale manager Keith Hill, as Head of Youth at Spotland.

In May 2013, Ellis was appointed as both Academy Manager and First Team Matchday Observational Coach, which ensured a bridge between Dale's youth system and the first team. He left the role in June 2023, after sixteen years at the club, to take up the role of Head of North Academy Recruitment at Wolverhampton Wanderers.

== Blackpool F.C. Hall of Fame ==
Ellis was inducted into the Hall of Fame at Bloomfield Road when it was officially opened by former Blackpool player Jimmy Armfield in April 2006. Organised by the Blackpool Supporters Association, Blackpool fans around the world voted on their all-time heroes. Five players from each decade are inducted; Ellis is in the 1990s.

== Career statistics ==
Appearances and goals by club, season and competition
Club	Season	League			FA Cup		League Cup		Other (Note: Includes Football League play-offs, Football League Trophy.)		Total	
Club	Season	Division	Apps	Goals	Apps	Goals	Apps	Goals	Apps	Goals	Apps	Goals
Oldham Athletic	1986–87	Second Division	5	0	0	0	1	0	1	0	7	0
Oldham Athletic	1987–88	Second Division	3	0	0	0	0	0	0	0	3	0
Oldham Athletic	Total		8	0	0	0	1	0	1	0	10	0
Preston North End	1987–88	Third Division	24	4	1	0	0	0	6	2	31	6
Preston North End	1988–89	Third Division	45	20	2	0	3	0	4	0	54	20
Preston North End	1989–90	Third Division	17	3	2	0	0	0	2	3	21	6
Preston North End	Total		86	27	5	0	3	0	12	5	106	32
Stoke City	1989–90	Second Division	24	6	0	0	0	0	0	0	24	6
Stoke City	1990–91	Third Division	38	9	3	0	3	0	2	0	46	9
Stoke City	1991–92	Third Division	15	4	2	0	3	1	3	0	23	5
Stoke City	Total		77	19	5	0	6	1	5	0	93	20
Preston North End	1992–93	Second Division	35	22	2	1	2	1	1	1	40	25
Preston North End	1993–94	Third Division	37	26	4	2	2	1	5	2	48	31
Preston North End	Total		72	48	6	3	4	2	6	3	88	56
Blackpool	1994–95	Second Division	40	17	1	0	2	1	1	0	44	18
Blackpool	1995–96	Second Division	43	14	3	0	2	2	5	1	53	17
Blackpool	1996–97	Second Division	45	15	1	0	4	3	2	2	52	20
Blackpool	1997–98	Second Division	18	8	2	1	3	0	0	0	23	9
Blackpool	Total		146	54	7	1	11	6	8	3	172	64
Bury	1997–98	First Division	22	6	0	0	0	0	0	0	22	6
Bury	1997–98	First Division	16	2	0	0	4	0	0	0	20	2
Bury	Total		38	8	0	0	4	0	0	0	42	8
Stockport County	1998–99	First Division	16	6	0	0	0	0	0	0	16	6
Stockport County	1999–2000	First Division	4	0	0	0	2	0	0	0	6	0
Stockport County	Total		20	6	0	0	2	0	0	0	22	6
Rochdale	1999–2000	Third Division	31	11	1	0	0	0	5	0	37	11
Rochdale	2000–01	Third Division	28	6	1	0	1	1	1	0	31	7
Rochdale	Total		59	17	2	0	1	1	6	0	68	18
Burnley	2001–02	First Division	11	1	0	0	0	0	0	0	11	1
Career total			517	180	25	4	32	10	38	11	612	205

== Honours ==
Individual

- PFA Team of the Year: 1993–94 Third Division
