= Mick Norbury =

English footballer (born 1969)

Personal information
- Full name: Michael Norbury
- Date of birth: 22 January 1969 (age 57)
- Place of birth: Hemsworth, England
- Height: 6 ft 1 in (1.85 m)
- Position: Forward

Senior career*
Years	Team	Apps	(Gls)
1987–1989	Ossett Town		
1989–1990	Scarborough	0	(0)
1990–?	Ossett Town		
?–1992	Bridlington Town		
1992	Cambridge United	26	(3)
1992–1994	Preston North End	42	(13)
1994–1996	Doncaster Rovers	27	(5)
1995	→Linfield (loan)	1	(0)
1996–1997	Stafford Rangers		
1997–?	Halifax Town		
?–2001	Hednesford Town		
2001–2002	Emley		
2002	Stocksbridge Park Steels		
2002	Belper Town		
2002–?	Ossett Albion		
?	Goole		

Managerial career
- 2009–2010: Worsbrough Bridge Athletic
- 2013–2015: Maltby Main
- 2015: Glasshoughton Welfare
- * Club domestic league appearances and goals

Michael Norbury (born 22 January 1969) is an English football forward. Norbury made nearly 100 appearances in the Football League although the majority of his playing career was spent in minor leagues.

== Early career ==
Norbury began his career in non-League football with Ossett Town before entering the Football League with Scarborough in December 1989. However, he did not make an appearance at the club and soon returned to Ossett Town and then Bridlington Town. Norbury returned to the Football League with Cambridge United in February 1992 and played 26 league games for the club, fifteen of which were as a substitute. He moved to Preston North End that December and made 42 league appearances (32 starts, 10 substitute) for the club before moving on to Doncaster Rovers in November 1994, racking up 19 league starts and 8 substitute appearances. During his time at Belle Vue Norbury was loaned out to Linfield of the Irish Football League. He made a sole league appearance for them, starting in a 3–0 defeat at Glenavon.

== Return to non-league ==
Norbury dropped out of the league by signing for Stafford Rangers after being released by Doncaster Rovers. He subsequently signed for Halifax Town where he discovered his goalscoring touch, hitting 14 goals in the 1997–98 season. Norbury would subsequently become known as a non-league journeyman and during two spells with Hednesford Town became notorious for his physical style of play which saw him rack up a number of red cards.

He joined Emley in summer 2001 and spent the 2001–02 season at the club before departing to join Stocksbridge Park Steels in June. He joined Belper Town in October but was gone again less than a month later, signing for Ossett Albion.

== Coaching ==
Norbury entered coaching in the later part of the 2000s, becoming player/assistant manager at Goole in 2005. Norbury's fiery temper was again to the fore in 2006 when, in this role, he received a six-year touchline ban for two consecutive counts of foul and abusive language and threatening behaviour towards referees. He and manager Nigel Danby resigned from their posts in September 2009.

He was subsequently appointed manager of Worsbrough Bridge Athletic in October 2009, before leaving to become assistant manager at Harrogate Railway Athletic in June 2010. In September 2013, he was appointed manager of Maltby Main. He resigned from Maltby in April 2015. In June 2015 he became manager of Glasshoughton Welfare, but resigned in November, becoming assistant manager at Armthorpe Welfare a few days later. He moved onto Ossett Town in February 2016, and then returned to Goole in November 2017.
