= Gavin Nebbeling =

South African footballer

Personal information
- Full name: Gavin Mark Nebbeling
- Date of birth: 15 May 1963 (age 63)
- Place of birth: Johannesburg, South Africa
- Height: 6 ft 0 in (1.83 m)
- Position: Central defender

Youth career
- Arcadia Shepherds

Senior career*
Years	Team	Apps	(Gls)
1981–1989	Crystal Palace	151	(8)
1985–1986	→ Northampton Town (loan)	11	(0)
1989–1993	Fulham	88	(2)
1991–1992	→ Hereford United (loan)	2	(0)
1993–1995	Preston North End	22	(4)
1995–1998	Kingstonian	62	(4)
Total		337	(18)
- * Club domestic league appearances and goals

Gavin Mark Nebbeling (born 15 May 1963) is a South African former professional footballer who was active exclusively in England between 1981 and 1998. Nebbeling, who played as a central defender, made over 250 appearances in the Football League and over 300 senior professional appearances throughout his entire career.

== Career ==
Born in Johannesburg, Nebbeling played youth football in his native South Africa with Arcadia Shepherds before beginning his professional career in August 1981 with English League side Crystal Palace. While at Palace Nebbeling spent a loan spell with Northampton Town, before signing permanently with Fulham in 1989. While at Fulham, Nebbeling was their only foreign player. Nebbeling spent another loan spell at Hereford United, before signing permanently with Preston North End in 1993. Nebbeling made a total of 275 appearances in the Football League, scoring 14 goals. He later played non-league football with Kingstonian, scoring four goals in 62 appearances.

== After football ==
After retiring as a player, Nebbeling became a photocopier salesman.
