= Mike Flynn (footballer) =

English footballer (born 1969)

Personal information
- Full name: Michael Anthony Flynn
- Date of birth: 23 February 1969 (age 57)
- Place of birth: Oldham, England
- Position: Defender

Youth career
- 1985–1987: Oldham Athletic

Senior career*
Years	Team	Apps	(Gls)
1987–1988	Oldham Athletic	40	(1)
1988–1989	Norwich City	0	(0)
1989–1993	Preston North End	136	(7)
1993–2002	Stockport County	387	(16)
2002	→ Stoke City (loan)	13	(0)
2002–2003	Barnsley	21	(0)
2003	→ Blackpool (loan)	13	(0)
2003–2004	Blackpool	44	(1)
2004–2005	Accrington Stanley	43	(0)
2005–2006	Hyde United	41	(0)
2006	→ Mossley (loan)		
2006–2007	Stalybridge Celtic		
2007–2009	Radcliffe Borough		
2009–2011	Salford City		
- * Club domestic league appearances and goals

Michael Anthony Flynn (born 23 February 1969) is an English footballer who made more than 650 appearances in the Football League playing for Oldham Athletic, Preston North End, Stockport County, Stoke City, Barnsley and Blackpool.

== Career ==
=== Oldham Athletic ===
Flynn began his career with his hometown club Oldham Athletic first signing apprentice forms in July 1985 before turning professional in February 1987. He made an immediate impact with the "Latics" going straight into the first team and earning a reputation as a no nonsense centre half. Playing in the Second Division Flynn was attracting attention from some of the bigger clubs and in December 1988 at the age of 19, and after playing 44 games and scoring one goal he signed for First Division club Norwich City for a fee of £100,000.

=== Norwich and Preston ===
Flynn's time at Norwich was for him a frustrating one though for in his twelve months with the club he failed to make a single appearance. In December 1989 Third Division club Preston North End tabled a bid of £125,000 which Norwich accepted enabling Flynn to return to his native north-west of England. His time at Preston was, however, a difficult one for although his performances were generally good the club were struggling with some of their better players being sold to boost the club coffers. In his time at Deepdale they sold Tony Ellis, Warren Joyce, Alan Kelly, Martin James, Brian Mooney and Mark Patterson. It therefore came as no surprise when Flynn himself was sold to Stockport County in March 1993 for a fee of £125,000. In Flynn's three and a half years at Preston he had played 162 games scoring eight goals.

=== Stockport County ===
Flynn's move to Edgeley Park started a ten-year spell with the club. He won the supporters' Player of the year award in the 1993–94 season. Flynn helped the club to the Second Division play-off final at Wembley where they lost to north west rivals Burnley. The following season saw Flynn given the captain's armband and in the 1996–97 season captained the side to promotion to the First Division (by then the second tier of English football) as well as to the semi-final of the League Cup, round four of the FA Cup and the Football League Trophy northern final. Flynn was an ever-present that season playing a total of 66 games.

Flynn's performances had not gone unnoticed and when an £800,000 bid from Birmingham City was rejected by County in February 1999 Flynn was somewhat unhappy. He did though sort things out with County and later on in the year signed a new contract with the club. During the 2001–02 season County began to struggle and when manager Andy Kilner was sacked, it was thought that Flynn might be in the running for the job. It was not to be though as just before Christmas 2001 Carlton Palmer was given the job and Flynn was weeks later loaned out to Stoke City. In Flynn's two months at the Britannia Stadium he played thirteen games. Shortly after the loan was extended into a third month, Flynn left to join Steve Parkin's Barnsley of the First Division; Stockport gave him a free transfer and promised him a testimonial match, despite his having been with the club for less than the customary ten years. In all Flynn played 460 games for "the Hatters", scoring 19 goals.

On 18 July 2014 Stockport held a testimonial for Mike Flynn at their home Edgeley Park the event was attended by over 30 Stockport legends including Kevin Francis, Andy Preece and many others. Flynn donated half the money made on the night back into the club.

=== Barnsley and Blackpool ===
In little over a year at Oakwell he played just 21 games before in January 2003 returning to the North West with Blackpool, initially on loan and then permanently in March of the same year. Flynn's committed performances made him a favourite at Bloomfield Road and he played more than 50 games for the club, taking his League career tally to 654 games played and 25 goals scored. In 2004 he started the final as Blackpool won the 2003–04 Football League Trophy.

=== Later career ===
In September 2004 Flynn signed an 18-month contract with Accrington Stanley, and was with the club when they were crowned champions of the Conference National in the 2005–06 season. He played 45 games for Accrington before leaving for Conference North club Hyde United in November 2005 and then in December 2006 Stalybridge Celtic. In 2007 Flynn signed for Northern Premier League Division One North club Radcliffe Borough, moving to divisional rivals Salford City in January 2009, where he became assistant manager as well as player.

In September 2017, he left a coaching role with Stockport County's first team to take up a youth coaching role at Rochdale.

== Career statistics ==
Club	Season	League			FA Cup		League Cup		Other^{[A]}		Total	
Club	Season	Division	Apps	Goals	Apps	Goals	Apps	Goals	Apps	Goals	Apps	Goals
Oldham Athletic	1987–88	Second Division	31	1	1	0	1	0	1	0	34	1
Oldham Athletic	1988–89	Second Division	9	0	0	0	1	0	1	0	11	0
Oldham Athletic	Total		40	1	1	0	2	0	2	0	45	1
Preston North End	1989–90	Third Division	23	1	1	0	0	0	2	0	26	1
Preston North End	1990–91	Third Division	35	1	1	0	2	0	6	0	44	1
Preston North End	1991–92	Third Division	43	3	3	1	2	0	3	0	51	1
Preston North End	1992–93	Second Division	35	2	2	0	2	0	2	0	41	2
Preston North End	Total		136	7	7	1	6	0	13	0	162	8
Stockport County	1992–93	Second Division	10	0	0	0	0	0	2	0	12	0
Stockport County	1993–94	Second Division	46	1	4	0	2	0	8	0	60	1
Stockport County	1994–95	Second Division	43	2	1	0	4	0	2	0	50	2
Stockport County	1995–96	Second Division	46	6	4	0	5	0	2	0	57	6
Stockport County	1996–97	Second Division	46	2	4	1	11	1	5	0	66	4
Stockport County	1997–98	First Division	34	1	1	0	2	1	0	0	37	2
Stockport County	1998–99	First Division	46	1	2	0	2	0	0	0	50	1
Stockport County	1999–2000	First Division	46	1	1	0	4	0	0	0	51	1
Stockport County	2000–01	First Division	44	0	3	0	2	0	0	0	49	0
Stockport County	2001–02	First Division	26	2	0	0	2	0	0	0	28	2
Stockport County	Total		387	16	20	1	34	2	19	0	460	19
Stoke City (loan)	2001–02	Second Division	13	0	0	0	0	0	0	0	13	0
Stoke City (loan)	Total		13	0	0	0	0	0	0	0	13	0
Barnsley	2001–02	First Division	7	0	0	0	0	0	0	0	7	0
Barnsley	2002–03	First Division	14	0	0	0	0	0	0	0	14	0
Barnsley	Total		21	0	0	0	0	0	0	0	21	0
Blackpool	2002–03	Second Division	21	0	0	0	0	0	0	0	21	0
Blackpool	2003–04	Second Division	30	1	3	0	1	0	7	0	41	1
Blackpool	2004–05	League One	6	0	0	0	0	0	0	0	6	0
Blackpool	Total		57	1	3	0	1	0	7	0	68	1
Career total			654	25	31	2	43	2	41	0	769	29

A. The "Other" column constitutes appearances and goals in the Football League Trophy, Football League play-offs and Full Members Cup.

== Honours ==
Stockport County

- Second Division runner-up: 1996–97

Blackpool

- Football League Trophy: 2003–04

Accrington Stanley

- Conference National: 2005–06

Individual

- PFA Team of the Year: 1996–97 Second Division
