= Graham Shaw (footballer, born 1967) =

English footballer

Cllr Graham Shaw
Personal information
- Full name: Graham Paul Jack Shaw
- Date of birth: 7 June 1967 (age 59)
- Place of birth: Newcastle-under-Lyme, England
- Height: 5 ft 8 in (1.73 m)
- Position: Striker

Youth career
- 1983–1985: Stoke City

Senior career*
Years	Team	Apps	(Gls)
1985–1989	Stoke City	99	(18)
1989–1992	Preston North End	121	(29)
1992–1995	Stoke City	36	(5)
1994	→ Plymouth Argyle (loan)	6	(0)
1995–1996	Rochdale	22	(0)
Total		284	(52)
- * Club domestic league appearances and goals

Graham Paul Shaw (born 7 June 1967) is an English former footballer and politician who made nearly 300 appearances in the Football League playing for Stoke City, Preston North End, Plymouth Argyle and Rochdale between 1985 and 1996.

In 2026 he was elected as a Reform UK councillor for the Knutton ward in Newcastle-under-Lyme.

== Playing career ==
=== Stoke City ===
Shaw was born in Newcastle-under-Lyme and signed on professional terms for local side Stoke City in June 1985 after progressing through the youth ranks at the Victoria Ground. He had a decent debut season for Stoke in 1985–86 scoring five goals in 22 appearances. He played in 20 matches in 1986–87 scoring twice, and was the top-scorer in 1987–88 with ten goals. During that season, Stoke played Liverpool in the FA Cup and Shaw had the chance to win the match for Stoke after he was put through one on one with 'keeper Mike Hooper but Shaw hesitated thinking he was offside, and the chance had gone. Stoke went on to lose the replay 1–0. Shaw scored six goals in 33 games in the 1988–89 season before being surprisingly sold by Mick Mills to Third Division Preston North End for £70,000.

=== Preston North End ===
Shaw's time at Deepdale was a mixed affair however with him brilliant one game and then extremely disappointing the next. Much of this can however, be put down to injuries and the fact that he never really had a regular or good enough strike partner. His first season with the club though started like a house on fire with him scoring six goals in his first four games including a League cup hat-trick against Tranmere Rovers. The rest of the season was a disappointment, though, with Shaw picking up an injury a few games later against Bristol Rovers and adding only five more goals to his early season burst.

His next two seasons with the club were more consistent, with Shaw missing only a few games and scoring 15 goals in 1990–91 and 17 in 1991–92. Surprisingly, Shaw was offered the chance to return to Stoke on the eve of the 1992–93 season. With North End boss Les Chapman given funds to strengthen his squad after 2 disappointing seasons in which the club only just avoided relegation Shaw was sold back to Stoke as part payment for bringing Tony Ellis back to Preston. In all Shaw played 136(8) games for Preston scoring 42 goals.

=== Return to Stoke City ===
Shaw's second spell at Stoke started well with Shaw scoring six goals in 38 appearances in 1992–93 helping Stoke win the Second Division title. However, a persistent back injury limited his appearances and had a spell on loan at Plymouth Argyle at the beginning of the 1994–95 season also proved fruitless with Shaw failing to register a goal in six games.

=== Rochdale ===
In March 1995, Rochdale signed Shaw on a free transfer. In little over a season, Shaw played 28 games for the club, scoring just two goals and was released in May 1996.

== After football ==
Shaw considered coaching but after much deliberation decided to go to Staffordshire University and study criminal law. With the help of the PFA's education fund passed his final exams to become a fully qualified criminal lawyer. After working for a firm in Stoke-on-Trent for five years he now practices in Newcastle-Under-Lyme as a commercial sports solicitor. In August 2010 prospective Port Vale investor Mike Newton revealed his plans to install Shaw as Chief Executive of the club.

At the 2026 Newcastle-under-Lyme Borough Council election, Shaw was elected as the Reform UK councillor for the Knutton ward.

== Career statistics ==
Appearances and goals by club, season and competition
Club	Season	League			FA Cup		League Cup		Other		Total	
Club	Season	Division	Apps	Goals	Apps	Goals	Apps	Goals	Apps	Goals	Apps	Goals
Stoke City	1985–86	Second Division	20	5	1	0	0	0	1 (Note: Appearances in Full Members' Cup)	0	22	5
Stoke City	1986–87	Second Division	18	2	0	0	2	0	0	0	20	2
Stoke City	1987–88	Second Division	33	6	2	0	4	2	3	2	42	10
Stoke City	1988–89	Second Division	28	5	3	1	1	0	1	0	33	6
Stoke City	Total		99	18	6	1	7	2	5	2	117	23
Preston North End	1989–90	Third Division	31	5	1	0	2	4	3 (Note: Appearances in Football League Trophy)	2	37	11
Preston North End	1990–91	Third Division	44	10	1	0	1	1	7	4	53	15
Preston North End	1991–92	Third Division	46	14	3	1	2	1	3	0	54	16
Preston North End	Total		121	29	5	1	5	6	13	6	144	42
Stoke City	1992–93	Second Division	29	5	2	0	3	1	4	0	38	6
Stoke City	1993–94	First Division	4	0	1	0	0	0	1 (Note: Appearances in Anglo-Italian Cup)	0	6	0
Stoke City	1994–95	First Division	3	0	0	0	0	0	1	0	4	0
Stoke City	Total		36	5	3	0	3	1	6	0	48	6
Plymouth Argyle (loan)	1994–95	Second Division	6	0	0	0	0	0	0	0	6	0
Rochdale	1994–95	Third Division	4	0	0	0	0	0	0	0	4	0
Rochdale	1995–96	Third Division	18	0	3	0	1	1	2	0	24	1
Rochdale	Total		22	0	3	0	1	1	2	0	28	1
Career total			284	52	17	2	16	10	26	8	343	72

== Honours ==
Stoke City

- Football League Second Division: 1992–93

== Electoral history ==
Shaw contested, and won, the Knutton ward in Newcastle-under-Lyme Borough Council elections in May 2026.

2026 Newcastle-under-Lyme Borough Council election, Knutton Ward
Party	Candidate	Votes	%	±%
Reform	Graham Shaw	359	66.2	N/A
Labour	Joshua Gilbert	129	23.8	–24.1
Conservative	James Dowler	54	10.0	–24.5
Majority		230	42.3	N/A
Turnout		544	27.4	+2.4
Registered electors		1,988		
Reform hold				
