= Simon Farnworth =

English footballer

Personal information
- Full name: Simon Farnworth
- Date of birth: 28 October 1963 (age 63)
- Place of birth: Chorley, Lancashire, England
- Height: 6 ft 0 in (1.83 m)
- Position: Goalkeeper

Youth career
- 1981–1983: Bolton Wanderers

Senior career*
Years	Team	Apps	(Gls)
1983–1987	Bolton Wanderers	113	(0)
1986	→ Stockport County (loan)	10	(0)
1987	→ Tranmere Rovers (loan)	7	(0)
1987–1990	Bury	105	(0)
1990–1993	Preston North End	81	(0)
1993–1996	Wigan Athletic	126	(0)
Total		442	(0)
- * Club domestic league appearances and goals

Simon Farnworth (born 28 October 1963) is an English former footballer who played as a goalkeeper. He played for Bolton Wanderers, Bury, Preston North End and Wigan Athletic, and made over 500 appearances during his career.

Simon retired from playing in 1996, and joined the backroom staff at Wigan as a physiotherapist. He then joined Liverpool, where he worked for eleven years as the head physio at Liverpool's academy. In 2009, he joined Morecambe and was appointed as the first-team physio. He left Morecambe in 2022.

In 1986 Farnworth became to date the last goalkeeper in English League football to play a match without wearing gloves, in Bolton Wanderers' 0–3 loss to Bristol City in The Freight Rover Trophy Final at Wembley Stadium.

Farnworth featured regularly in the Masters Football tournament, and played for Wigan Athletic and Bolton Wanderers.

== Honours ==
Bolton Wanderers

- Associate Members' Cup runner-up: 1985–86
