= Lee Cartwright =

British footballer (born 1972)

Personal information
- Full name: Lee Cartwright
- Date of birth: 19 September 1972 (age 54)
- Place of birth: Rawtenstall, Lancashire, England
- Height: 5 ft 8 in (1.73 m)
- Position: Midfielder

Youth career
- 1989–1991: Preston North End

Senior career*
Years	Team	Apps	(Gls)
1991–2004	Preston North End	403	(26)
2004–2005	Stockport County	34	(1)
2005–2006	Rochdale	27	(1)
2006–2007	Scarborough	41	(4)
2007	Hyde United	22	(1)
Total		527	(33)
- * Club domestic league appearances and goals

Lee Cartwright (born 19 September 1972) is a retired footballer who made over 400 league appearances for Preston North End.

== Early years ==
Born in Rawtenstall, Rossendale, Lancashire,

== Career ==
=== Preston North End ===
Cartwright was signed from school as a trainee in 1989 by North End boss John McGrath.

Under McGrath's successor, Les Chapman, he made his first team debut at the age of 18 in a 1–0 home win against Shrewsbury Town in March 1991. Having broken into the first team, Cartwright remained a regular for the rest of the season.

In the following season, 1991–92, he missed only a handful of matches as he picked up the club's player of the year award as reward for a string of consistently good displays. In 1992-93, Preston were relegated from the Football League Second Division, although Cartwright's performances attracted interest from both Oldham Athletic and Blackpool. Persuaded to stay by new manager John Beck, Cartwright would remain at Deepdale for the next eleven years.

In his thirteen years at the club, Cartwright became a North End legend making a total of 472 appearances for the club, scoring 30 goals. He was an important member of the Preston teams that won the 1995–96 Third Division title and 1999–2000 Second Division title. Cartwright also played in the 1993–94 Third Division and 2000–01 First Division play-off final defeats.

== After Preston ==
In January 2004, Cartwright moved to Stockport County on a free transfer, where his 18-month stay was disrupted by injury, and then to Rochdale, where injuries limited him to 29 appearances before he was released.

Cartwright joined Conference North side Scarborough for the 2006–07 season, where he won the club's last Player of the Year award before their liquidation.

Cartwright signed for Hyde United for the 2007-08 Conference North season, before retiring from football.

== Honours ==
Preston North End

- Football League Second Division: 1999–2000
- Football League Third Division: 1995–96
