= John Beck (footballer) =

English footballer and manager

Personal information
- Full name: John Alexander Beck
- Date of birth: 25 May 1954 (age 72)
- Place of birth: Edmonton, England
- Height: 5 ft 11 in (1.80 m)
- Position: Midfielder

Senior career*
Years	Team	Apps	(Gls)
1972–1976	Queens Park Rangers	40	(1)
1976–1978	Coventry City	69	(6)
1978–1982	Fulham	114	(12)
1982–1986	AFC Bournemouth	137	(13)
1986–1989	Cambridge United	112	(11)
Total		472	(43)

Managerial career
- 1990–1992: Cambridge United
- 1992–1994: Preston North End
- 1995–1997: Lincoln City
- 2001: Cambridge United
- 2010: Histon
- 2012: Kettering Town
- * Club domestic league appearances and goals

John Alexander Beck (born 25 May 1954) is an English former footballer and manager. As a player, he made nearly 500 English Football League appearances for five clubs between 1972 and 1989.

As a manager, he had a highly successful spell in charge of Cambridge United in the early 1990s, when he guided the club to two successive promotions and two successive quarter-final appearances in the FA Cup. Beck took the club from the Fourth Division to the Second and very nearly to the new Premier League at the end of the 1991–92 season, where they ended their campaign fifth in the Second Division, their highest ever league finish.

In 2010, he was appointed manager of Conference National club Histon, but resigned two games into the 2010–11 season.

== Playing career ==
Beck started his playing career at Queens Park Rangers signing in May 1972 and made his debut in the 3–1 win against Leyton Orient in December 1972. Beck was unable to hold down a regular place in the immensely successful QPR side of the mid-1970s, competing with England captain Gerry Francis and Scottish international Don Masson for the creative midfield role. In 1976, the year that QPR finished second to Liverpool in the First Division, he moved to Coventry City after playing 40 league games for Rangers, scoring once. The 1977–78 season saw John Beck playing in what was arguably Coventry's most exciting top-flight team of all time. Gordon Milne's side containing Tommy Hutchison, Mick Ferguson, Ian Wallace, Terry Yorath, Graham Oakey, Bobby McDonald and Jim Blyth played scintillating attacking football that swept many teams aside, often by large margins of victory, although they failed to win any silverware or qualify for the UEFA Cup.

He later played for Fulham, AFC Bournemouth and finally joined Cambridge United in July 1986.

== Managerial career ==
Beck's career was ended by injury in 1989, and he was appointed assistant manager at Cambridge. Following the resignation of Chris Turner he was appointed manager January 1990, with Cambridge mid table in the Fourth Division. In his first season United won the Fourth Division playoffs, and reached the quarter-finals of the FA Cup – a rare achievement for a Fourth Division side. The following season (1990–91) they won the Third Division title after an excellent finish to the season saw them climb from 10th to top in less than three months, and they repeated the feat of reaching the FA Cup quarter-finals. During the Summer, Beck turned down the opportunity to manage Leicester City, saying he wanted to take the club all the way to the First Division. In fact he very nearly achieved this, as in 1991–92 they finished 5th in the Second Division, the highest position ever achieved by the club, but lost to Leicester City in the play-off semi-finals, ending their hopes of a third successive promotion (something which has still yet to be achieved in the English Football League) and denying them the chance of becoming Premier League founder members.

Beck's long ball playing style, despite its success, was heavily criticised in the media, and by fans and managers of other clubs, particularly Glenn Hoddle then of Swindon Town. Their style of play was similar to that of Wimbledon, who had climbed from the Fourth Division to the First in four seasons leading up to 1986, staying there for 14 years and winning an FA Cup just two seasons after promotion.

However, he remained popular with United fans for the success that he brought the club. He also oversaw many unorthodox developments at the club, including the tactical repositioning of the away team dugout, ensuring the grass around the corner area was longer so as to slow the ball down when played in that part of the pitch, and the practice of throwing buckets of cold water over players before a match.

The club made a poor start to the 1992–93 season, and Beck was dismissed in October 1992, marking the start of a sharp decline for the club; Cambridge ended the season relegated from the new Division One and just two years after that they fell into Division Three. That summer, he had sold top scorer Dion Dublin to Manchester United for £1million – although the player spent just two seasons at Old Trafford, he played top flight football for more than a decade and was capped four times by England. Other successful players to appear under Beck at Cambridge included striker Steve Claridge (who scored Leicester City's promotion-clinching goal in the 1996 Division One playoff final and the winning goal in their League Cup triumph a year later), and defenders Alan Kimble (who played seven seasons in the Premier League after joining Wimbledon) and Gary Rowett (who went on to play for four clubs in the Premier League).

He made a quick comeback with Preston North End, joining the club on 7 December 1992 with the club in danger of relegation from Division 2 (now League 1). Over the next few months Beck brought in many players, implemented his preferred long ball style of play and got the players to wear tracksuit bottoms under their shorts for better protection on the hard plastic pitch. There was a slight improvement in results and a noted improvement in attendances. However the club then lost its last five matches to suffer relegation to Division 3 (now League 2).

The following season in Division 3 saw another large turnover of players and a major promotion push. One of the players recruited in September 1993 was centre half David Moyes who later managed the club at the start of a long and successful managerial career. The club lost to Torquay United in the first leg of the Play Offs in 1994 but then won 4–1 after extra time in the second leg (the last ever match on the plastic pitch) to reach the Play Off Final at Wembley. Beck surprisingly replaced experienced centre half Stuart Hicks with youngster Jamie Squires for the Final and despite leading 2–1 at one stage they were ultimately beaten 4–2 by Wycombe Wanderers.

The 1994–1995 season started quite well for Preston but from September the club went on a run of seven successive League defeats. Despite a slight improvement Beck left Deepdale at the end of November 1994 and was replaced by his assistant Gary Peters who took the club to the Play Offs at the end of the season and ultimate promotion in 1996.

Beck's next stop was at Lincoln City in 1995. They won automatic promotion to Division Two in 1998, but Beck had been controversially sacked just weeks earlier.

In 1999, Beck teamed up with Shane Westley, his former assistant at Lincoln City and joined Barrow in a short lived advisory role.

Beck returned to Cambridge in March 2001, and kept them in Division Two, but he resigned the following November with relegation looking increasingly likely.

After a short period out of football, Beck became assistant manager to Steve Fallon at Histon, in what proved to be the most successful period in the club's history as the club rose from the lower leagues up to the Conference National. The club even came close to being promoted to the English Football League in the 2008–09 season, but missed out following a 2–1 aggregate defeat to Torquay Utd in the play-offs. In September 2009 however, Beck was sacked from the club after a fall-out with Fallon. Beck once again remained out of football until 21 May 2010, when he returned to Histon as manager, after Fallon himself had been sacked in January of that year, and interim manager Alan Lewer declined to apply for the job on a permanent basis. However, Beck resigned from the club on 19 August, following a league defeat away to AFC Wimbledon. Beck was appointed manager of Evo-Stik Southern Premier League club Kettering Town on 18 June 2012. However, he parted company with the club in September 2012. As of October 2013, Beck was working for the Football Association in coach education at the St George's Park National Football Centre, training coaches working towards their UEFA B Licence.

== Honours ==
=== As a player ===
Bournemouth

- Associate Members' Cup: 1983–84

=== As a manager ===
Cambridge United

- Football League Third Division: 1990–91
- Football League Fourth Division play-offs: 1990
