= Alex Perry (English footballer) =

English footballer

Personal information
- Full name: Alexander Perry
- Date of birth: 4 March 1998 (age 28)
- Place of birth: Liverpool, England
- Height: 1.75 m (5 ft 9 in)
- Position: Midfielder

Youth career
- –2016: Bolton Wanderers

Senior career*
Years	Team	Apps	(Gls)
2016–2018	Bolton Wanderers	0	(0)
2017	→ Sutton Coldfield Town (loan)	4	(0)
2018–2021	Wigan Athletic	21	(0)
2021–2022	Scunthorpe United	14	(0)
2023	Hyde	5	(0)
- * Club domestic league appearances and goals as of 17:00, 22 April 2023 (UTC)

Alexander Perry (born 4 March 1998) is an English footballer who plays as a midfielder most recently for Hyde United.

== Career ==
Perry came through Bolton's academy and made his debut for the team on 30 August 2016 when he started in a 2-0 home loss against Everton U-23s in the Football League Trophy Group Stage.

Perry joined Evo Stik Northern Premier club Sutton Coldfield on a month's loan on 28 October 2017.

He left Bolton on a free transfer at the end of the 2017–18 season following the expiry of his contract.

=== Wigan Athletic ===
In September 2018, he moved to Wigan Athletic, where he initially linked up with the club's development squad.

=== Scunthorpe United ===
Following his release from Wigan, he signed for EFL League Two Scunthorpe United on a two-year deal.

== Career statistics ==
As of match played 11 September 2021

Appearances and goals by club, season and competition
Club	Season	League			FA Cup		League Cup		Other		Total	
Club	Season	Division	Apps	Goals	Apps	Goals	Apps	Goals	Apps	Goals	Apps	Goals
Bolton Wanderers	2016–17	League One	0	0	1	0	0	0	1 (Note: Appearances in EFL Trophy)	0	2	0
Bolton Wanderers	2017–18	Championship	0	0	0	0	0	0	—		0	0
Bolton Wanderers	Total		0	0	1	0	0	0	1	0	2	0
Sutton Coldfield Town (loan)	2017–18	Northern Premier League Premier Division	4	0	0	0	—		1 (Note: Appearances in FA Trophy)	0	5	0
Wigan Athletic	2018–19	Championship	0	0	0	0	0	0	—		0	0
Wigan Athletic	2019–20	Championship	0	0	0	0	0	0	—		0	0
Wigan Athletic	2020–21	League One	21	0	1	0	0	0	3	0	25	0
Wigan Athletic	Total		21	0	1	0	0	0	3	0	25	0
Scunthorpe	2021–22	League Two	5	0	0	0	1	0	0	0	6	0
Career total			30	0	2	0	1	0	5	0	38	0
