= Joe Garner =

English footballer (born 1988)

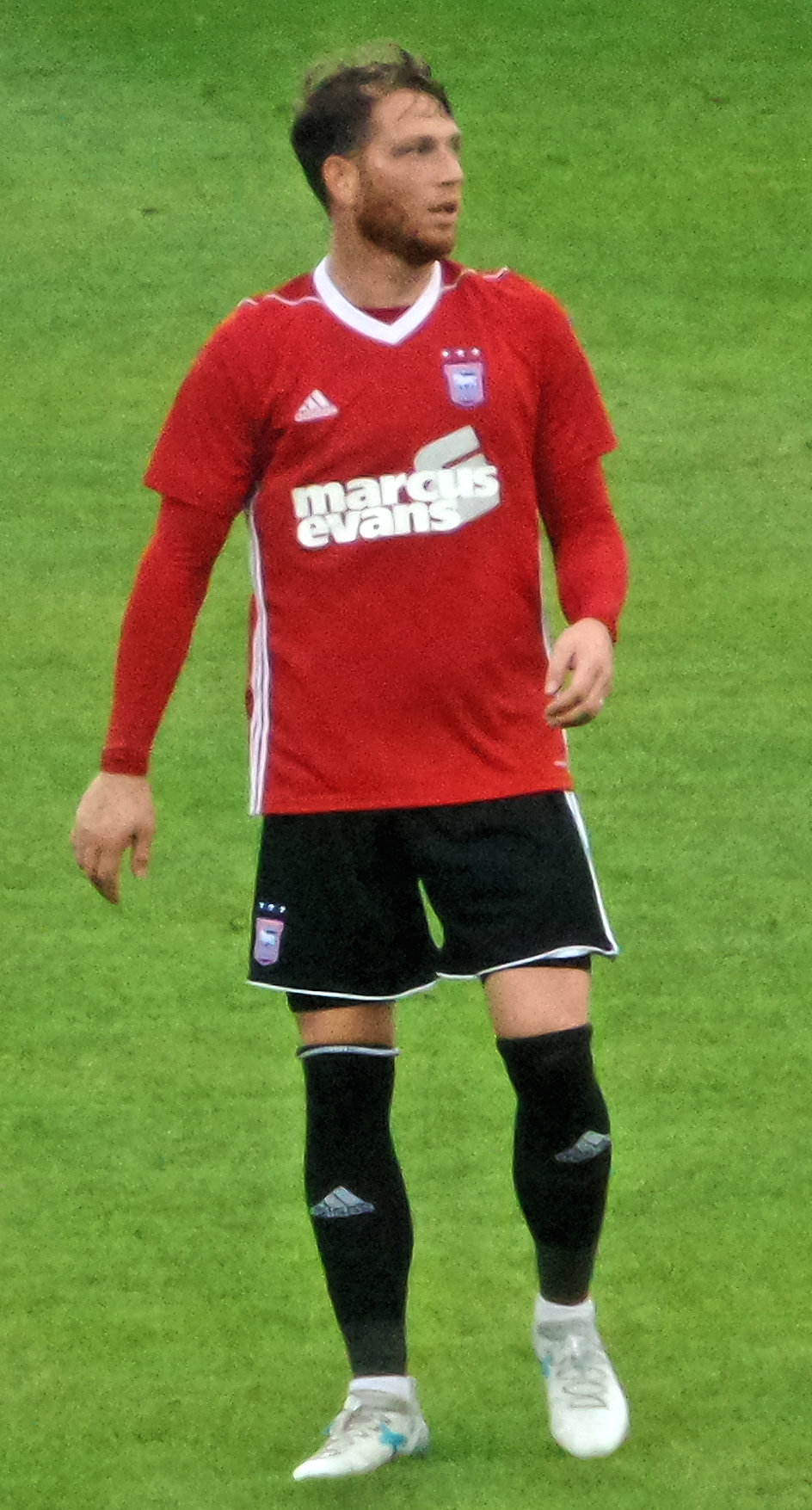
- Garner playing for Ipswich Town in 2017

Personal information
- Full name: Joseph Alan Garner
- Date of birth: 12 April 1988 (age 38)
- Place of birth: Blackburn, England
- Height: 5 ft 11 in (1.80 m)
- Position: Striker

Team information
- Current team: Morecambe
- Number: 14

Youth career
- –2006: Blackburn Rovers

Senior career*
Years	Team	Apps	(Gls)
2006–2007	Blackburn Rovers	0	(0)
2007	→ Carlisle United (loan)	18	(5)
2007–2008	Carlisle United	31	(14)
2008–2011	Nottingham Forest	48	(9)
2010–2011	→ Huddersfield Town (loan)	16	(0)
2011	→ Scunthorpe United (loan)	18	(6)
2011–2013	Watford	24	(1)
2012	→ Carlisle United (loan)	16	(8)
2013–2016	Preston North End	129	(49)
2016–2017	Rangers	31	(7)
2017–2018	Ipswich Town	32	(10)
2018–2020	Wigan Athletic	71	(13)
2021	APOEL	11	(8)
2021–2023	Fleetwood Town	38	(5)
2023–2024	Carlisle United	42	(5)
2024–2026	Oldham Athletic	29	(7)
2026–	Morecambe	0	(0)

International career
2003–2004	England U16	4	(4)
2004–2005	England U17	10	(5)
2005–2006	England U19	6	(3)
- * Club domestic league appearances and goals as of 21:09, 1 June 2025 (UTC)

Joseph Alan Garner (born 12 April 1988) is an English professional footballer who plays as a striker for Morecambe.

Garner started his career with Blackburn Rovers before joining Carlisle United. Garner had a three-year spell with Preston North End, where he made over 150 appearances and won the 2015 Football League One play-off final. Garner had previously moved to Wigan Athletic in 2018 and played there until 2020. Before moving to Morecambe, he played for Oldham Athletic between 2024 and 2026.

== Club career ==
=== Blackburn Rovers ===
Born in Blackburn, Garner started his career at then Premier League club Blackburn Rovers and playing as a striker played in the same position as his namesake Simon Garner, Blackburn's highest-ever goalscorer and club legend during the 1980s and early 1990s. Contrary to some stories, the two are not related. He played for the youth and reserve teams at Ewood Park and was a prolific scorer at youth level, his record including scoring two hat tricks in one game against Manchester United U16. Despite Blackburn having high hopes for the player, Garner did not make the breakthrough into the Blackburn Rovers senior squad due to competition for places in the Blackburn line up with players such as Paul Dickov, Paul Gallagher, Craig Bellamy, Benni McCarthy and Roque Santa Cruz forcing Garner to drop down two divisions in search of regular first team football.

=== Carlisle United ===
On 19 January 2007, Garner joined Carlisle United on loan until the end of the 2006–07 season. Garner scored his first ever league goal for Carlisle United at Brunton Park on 10 February 2007, in a game against Yeovil Town, which Carlisle went on to lose 4–1. On 17 March 2007, he scored and was sent off in a 1–1 draw with Huddersfield Town at Brunton Park, receiving a second yellow card for diving after a tackle from former United goalkeeper Matt Glennon. His powerful shot, from well outside the box, at Port Vale on 7 April 2007 was voted goal of the season by United fans. Despite initial resistance to a permanent deal from the Blackburn Rovers management, Garner eventually signed permanently for Carlisle United on 10 August 2007 for a club record fee of £140,000, which could rise to £150,000 if United gain promotion to the Championship. Scottish Premier League side Dundee United were also interested in signing Garner, before he joined Carlisle United.

=== Nottingham Forest ===
On 25 July 2008, less than a year after joining Carlisle, Garner was sold to Nottingham Forest for a fee of £1.14m. He signed a four-year contract, keeping him at the Reds until 2012. He was recovering from a knee ligament operation at the time of the transfer. Garner returned from his injury in late October 2008, when he started in a 1–0 home defeat to Cardiff City. He then scored his first goal for the club three weeks later, scoring the first goal in a 2–2 draw at Bristol City. A further two weeks later, he scored his first goal at the City Ground in Forest's 1–0 victory against Barnsley, and followed this up with another goal at Coventry City. He then netted a 'majestic' 35-yard chip in a 2–0 victory at Southampton, before scoring his fifth of the season in the 4–2 home loss against Doncaster Rovers, a result which cost the Forest manager Colin Calderwood his job. After the arrival of new manager Billy Davies at Forest on 1 January 2009, Garner struggled to hold a regular first-team place during the remainder of the season and was limited to mainly substitute appearances. However, Garner netted his first goal under Davies with a crucial 83rd-minute equaliser against Bristol City on 11 April 2009, a game that ended in a 3–2 Forest win.

The beginning of the 2009–10 season saw Garner forge his way into Davies' plans, playing on the right side of midfield occasionally. He scored his first goal of the 2009–10 season on 17 April 2010 against Blackpool. His second and last of the season was a 'cool finish' against Scunthorpe United, in a game that finished in a 2–2 draw. He made 14 league starts during the season. Due to then Forest manager Billy Davies preferring other striking options, Garner spent almost the entire 2010–11 season out on loan with a spell at Huddersfield Town and then Scunthorpe United. On 21 July 2010, Garner joined League One side Huddersfield Town on a six-month loan deal. He made his Terriers debut in the 3–0 win over Notts County at Meadow Lane on 7 August 2010. He failed to score during his time at Huddersfield, and on 5 January 2011, he returned to Forest. After making no appearances for Forest upon his return, Garner joined Scunthorpe United on loan until the end of the 2010–11 season on 31 January 2011. Davies went on record stating that the move to United was to give Garner playing time. He scored twice in Scunthorpe's 4–1 win against league leaders Queens Park Rangers on 9 April 2011. Scunthorpe finished bottom of the Championship league table and were relegated, and Garner returned to Forest at the end of the 2010–11 season. The following season, with a depleted number of striking options available to new manager Steve McClaren, Garner made his first appearance for Forest in over a year coming on as a second-half substitute against Barnsley.

=== Watford ===
On 31 August 2011, Garner signed for Watford for an undisclosed fee believed to be £200,000. Garner stated that he was 'desperate for first-team football', while manager Sean Dyche said that he hoped he could 'revitalise' his new striker. Garner made his Watford debut as a substitute in a 2–0 away win against Reading, replacing Marvin Sordell, on 10 September 2011. His first start came on 24 September 2011 against his old club Nottingham Forest, a game which Watford lost 1–0. His first and only goal for the Hertfordshire club came in a 2–0 away win at Millwall on 31 January 2012.

Garner signed a one-month loan deal with Carlisle United on 18 September 2012, confirming his second spell with the club. Garner scored his first goal after his return to The Cumbrians in a 2–1 victory away at Walsall. Carlisle manager Greg Abbott stated his desire to extend Garner's stay at the club, and a deal was agreed soon after. On 16 October, Garner scored a late equaliser for Carlisle in a 1–1 away draw at Bury. He then scored two against Oldham Athletic to help his side win 3–1 on 23 October. After a goal in the 4–2 FA Cup win over Ebbsfleet United, Garner opened the scoring in a 1–1 draw against Preston North End with a penalty. Later that week, Garner scored against Brentford and had a penalty saved by Brentford goalkeeper Simon Moore.

=== Preston North End ===
On 8 January 2013, Garner agreed an 18-month contract with Preston with an option for a further year. Garner supported Preston as a boy, attending games in the Town End stand. This came after he was released by Watford. He scored his first goal for the club in a 1–0 win away at Notts County on 12 March 2013. On 27 November 2013, in an away fixture at Port Vale, Garner was involved in a scuffle with Vale's Anthony Griffith, but the referee Andy Madley sent off Neil Kilkenny by accident instead. Garner controversially went on to score both goals in a 2–0 victory at Vale Park. Following the debacle the red card was switched from Kilkenny to Garner and a 3 match ban followed, despite Vale player Anthony Griffith stating that he was never struck by Garner. On 20 December 2013, Preston exercised the option of the further year contract, keeping him at the club until the summer of 2015, after he had hit a rich vein of form which began with a late header against Tranmere at Deepdale. On 14 January 2014, Garner came on as a substitute in the 62nd minute of Preston's FA Cup game against Ipswich and scored a hat-trick, including 2 goals in the space of 1 minute to help them to a 3–2 win. He scored a "terrific 25-yard volley" to equalise against Rotherham United in the play-off semi-final first leg, but Rotherham won the second leg to progress to the final. On 14 March 2015, Garner scored 4 goals for Preston in a 5–1 rout of Crewe. On 16 June 2015, Garner signed a further three-year contract with Preston North End. In the following 2015–2016 season, with Preston North End now back in the Championship, Garner grabbed his 100th career goal in a 2–1 victory at home to Charlton Athletic.

=== Rangers ===
On 20 August 2016, Garner signed a three-year contract with Scottish Premiership side Rangers. The fee for the move was estimated to be around £1.8 million. He made his debut on 26 August 2016, away to Kilmarnock, coming on as a substitute after an injury to Joe Dodoo. On 10 September 2016, he scored his first goal for the club, albeit only a consolation, in a 5–1 defeat against Celtic. Despite a debut Old Firm goal, Garner failed to net again for the club in over six weeks until he headed an equaliser in Rangers' 1–1 draw at home to St Johnstone in the Scottish Premiership on 26 October 2016. He followed this with his third Rangers goal in the next match, scoring the third in a 3–0 win over Kilmarnock three days later. His scoring streak would not continue and Garner failed to score in the succeeding matches which led to criticism from Rangers fans over his goal return while Neil McCann, a media commentator and former Rangers player, questioned his suitability with the starting formation.

However, by mid-December 2016, Garner's energetic performances managed to win over the Rangers fans and they adopted the song Glad All Over by band The Dave Clark Five as a tribute to him then launched a late campaign to make the song the Christmas number one, with it eventually reaching number 31. Garner started his third Old Firm match on Hogmanay 2016 but left the field after being injured in the buildup to Rangers' goal, being replaced by Martyn Waghorn after sixteen minutes. On 3 January 2017, it was reported he would be sidelined for one to three months with a dislocated shoulder, although later reports indicated Garner could return in early February 2017. Garner scored his first hat-trick for the club in a 6–0 victory over Hamilton Academical in a Scottish Cup quarter-final match on 4 March 2017.

=== Ipswich Town ===
On 16 June 2017, Garner left Rangers to join EFL Championship side Ipswich Town with the fee reported to be £1m. He scored his first goal for Ipswich on his debut in a 1–0 win over Birmingham City on 5 August 2017. He scored 10 goals in 32 appearances during his debut season at Ipswich.

=== Wigan Athletic ===
On 9 August 2018, Garner signed for Wigan on a 2-year deal for an undisclosed fee. He left by mutual consent on 30 December 2020.

=== APOEL ===
On 1 January 2021, Garner signed for APOEL on an 18-month contract. he made his debut for APOEL coming on as a substitute in a 0–0 draw against Anorthosis Famagusta. He scored his first goal for the club in a 3–2 away win over Olympiakos Nicosia making the score 1–3 . He also scored a hattrick against Nea Salamis Famagusta in a 3–1 victory.

=== Fleetwood Town ===
On 30 August 2021, Garner signed for Fleetwood Town on a free transfer, linking up with his former boss Simon Grayson. He scored his first league goal for the club on 30 October in a 3–3 draw against Wycombe Wanderers.

=== Carlisle United ===
On 19 January 2023, Garner returned to Carlisle United on an eighteen-month deal.

=== Oldham Athletic ===
On 31 January 2024, Garner joined National League club Oldham Athletic on an eighteen-month contract.

=== Morecambe ===
In July 2026, Garner signed a one-year contract with Morecambe, with the option for a further year.

== International career ==
Garner has represented England at under-19 level. During the 2006 UEFA European Under-19 Football Championship elite qualification, Garner scored in a 2–1 loss to the Belgium under-19s and also made appearances against Northern Ireland under-19s and Serbia & Montenegro under-19s. Garner also appeared in an under-19 friendly against the Netherlands.

== Career statistics ==
As of match played 27 January 2024

Appearances and goals by club, season and competition
Club	Season	League			National Cup (Note: Includes FA Cup, Scottish Cup, Cypriot Cup)		League Cup (Note: Includes Football League Cup/EFL Cup, Scottish League Cup)		Other		Total	
Club	Season	Division	Apps	Goals	Apps	Goals	Apps	Goals	Apps	Goals	Apps	Goals
Blackburn Rovers	2006–07	Premier League	0	0	0	0	0	0	0	0	0	0
Carlisle United (loan)	2006–07	League One	18	5	0	0	0	0	0	0	18	5
Carlisle United	2007–08	League One	31	14	2	0	1	0	1 (Note: Appearance(s) in Football League Trophy)	0	35	14
Nottingham Forest	2008–09	Championship	28	7	2	1	0	0	—		30	8
Nottingham Forest	2009–10	Championship	18	2	1	0	2	0	0	0	21	2
Nottingham Forest	2010–11	Championship	0	0	0	0	0	0	0	0	0	0
Nottingham Forest	2011–12	Championship	2	0	0	0	2	0	—		4	0
Nottingham Forest	Total		48	9	3	1	4	0	0	0	55	10
Huddersfield Town (loan)	2010–11	League One	16	0	0	0	1	0	2	0	19	0
Scunthorpe United (loan)	2010–11	Championship	18	6	0	0	0	0	—		18	6
Watford	2011–12	Championship	22	1	2	0	0	0	—		24	1
Watford	2012–13	Championship	2	0	0	0	1	0	0	0	3	0
Watford	Total		24	1	2	0	1	0	0	0	27	1
Carlisle United (loan)	2012–13	League One	16	7	2	1	0	0	0	0	18	8
Preston North End	2012–13	League One	14	0	0	0	0	0	1	0	15	0
Preston North End	2013–14	League One	35	18	5	5	2	0	3 (Note: Two appearances and one goal in League One play-offs, one appearance in Football League Trophy)	1	45	24
Preston North End	2014–15	League One	37	25	2	0	0	0	5 (Note: Three appearances and one goal in League One play-offs, two appearances and one goal in Football League Trophy)	2	44	27
Preston North End	2015–16	Championship	41	6	1	0	2	0	—		44	6
Preston North End	2016–17	Championship	2	0	0	0	1	0	—		3	0
Preston North End	Total		129	49	8	5	5	0	9	3	151	57
Rangers	2016–17	Scottish Premiership	31	7	2	3	1	0	—		34	10
Ipswich Town	2017–18	Championship	32	10	0	0	0	0	—		32	10
Wigan Athletic	2018–19	Championship	33	8	0	0	0	0	—		33	8
Wigan Athletic	2019–20	Championship	27	2	0	0	0	0	—		27	2
Wigan Athletic	2020–21	League One	11	3	1	1	1	2	1 (Note: Appearance in EFL Trophy)	1	14	7
Wigan Athletic	Total		71	13	1	1	1	2	1	1	74	17
APOEL	2020–21	Cypriot First Division	11	8	4	1	—		0	0	15	9
Fleetwood Town	2021–22	League One	18	4	1	1	0	0	0	0	19	5
Fleetwood Town	2022–23	League One	20	1	0	0	2	0	2	2	24	3
Fleetwood Town	Total		38	5	1	1	2	0	2	0	43	8
Carlisle United	2022–23	League Two	19	2	0	0	0	0	3 (Note: Appearances in League Two play-offs)	0	22	2
Carlisle United	2023–24	League One	23	3	1	1	0	0	2	0	26	4
Carlisle United	Total		42	5	1	1	0	0	5	0	48	6
Career total			525	139	26	13	16	2	20	4	587	161

== Honours ==
Preston North End

- Football League One play-offs: 2015

Carlisle United

- EFL League Two play-offs: 2023

Oldham Athletic

- National League play-offs: 2025

Individual

- PFA Fans' Player of the Year: 2014–15 League One
- PFA Team of the Year: 2014–15 League One
- Football League One Player of the Year: 2014–15
- Football League One top scorer: 2014–15
- Football League Goal of the Year: 2014–15
- Preston North End Player of the Year: 2013–14
- Preston North End Players' Player of the Year: 2013–14
