= Callum Lang =

English footballer (born 1998)

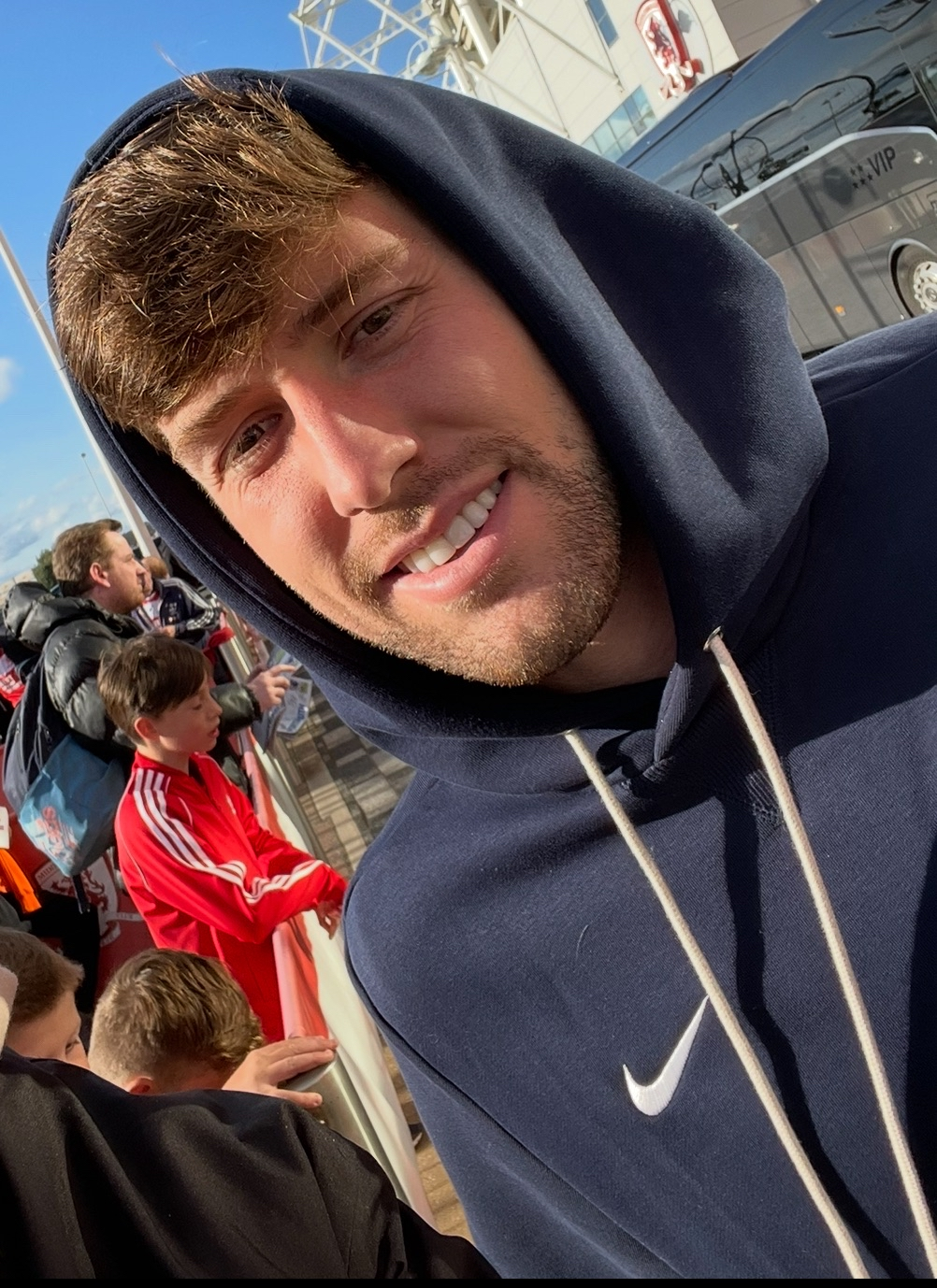
- Callum Lang in 2024.

Personal information
- Full name: Callum Joseph Lang
- Date of birth: 8 September 1998 (age 28)
- Place of birth: Liverpool, England
- Height: 5 ft 11 in (1.80 m)
- Position: Forward

Team information
- Current team: Preston North End
- Number: 10

Youth career
- –2013: Liverpool
- 2013–2017: Wigan Athletic

Senior career*
Years	Team	Apps	(Gls)
2017–2024	Wigan Athletic	124	(27)
2017–2018	→ Morecambe (loan)	30	(10)
2018–2019	→ Oldham Athletic (loan)	42	(13)
2019–2020	→ Shrewsbury Town (loan)	16	(3)
2020–2021	→ Motherwell (loan)	17	(3)
2024–2026	Portsmouth	52	(16)
2026–	Preston North End	19	(4)
- * Club domestic league appearances and goals as of 02:16, 4 November 2026 (UTC)

Callum Joseph Lang (born 8 September 1998) is an English professional footballer who plays as a forward for EFL Championship club Preston North End.

== Club career ==
=== Wigan Athletic ===
Lang joined Wigan Athletic in 2013, after progressing through the Liverpool youth ranks. After four years in the Wigan youth set-up, Lang was involved in a senior matchday squad for the first time on 7 May 2017, when he was an unused substitute in a 1–1 home draw with Leeds United in Wigan's final game of the 2016–17 EFL Championship season, with Latics already relegated.

He made his professional debut and played his first game for Wigan Athletic on 8 August 2017 in an EFL Cup first round tie against Blackpool, which ended as a 2–1 home victory for Latics. Lang came on in the 65th minute for Chris Merrie.

==== 2017/18 season: Morecambe (loan) ====
After playing three times for Wigan that month, including making his first Wigan start in a 1-1 draw away to Blackpool in the Football League Trophy, on 31 August 2017 Lang signed for EFL League Two side Morecambe on a season-long loan. He scored his first goal on 9 December in a 2–0 home win over Coventry City. His good form continued after that first goal, as he was named EFL Young Player of the Month in December 2017, scoring 5 goals in 5 games across the month, including two in a 4–3 win away to Yeovil Town. Lang ended the season with 10 league goals in 30 league games for Morecambe, as they ended the season in 22nd place in League Two, only avoiding relegation to the National League on goal difference on the final day of the season.

==== 2018/19 season: Oldham Athletic (loan) ====
On 14 August 2018, Lang signed a new two-year deal with Wigan and joined League Two side Oldham Athletic on loan until January 2019, subsequently extended until the end of the season. He scored the winning goal in the FA Cup Third Round tie against Premier League club Fulham at Craven Cottage on 6 January 2019. He totalled 50 appearances for Oldham over the season and scored 16 goals, as they finished 14th in League Two in their first season back in the fourth tier since the 1970–71 season.

==== New contract and Wigan league debut ====
Off the back of 26 goals over the previous two seasons, Lang signed a new three-year contract with Wigan on 1 August 2019 and played for them for the first time in almost two years on 13 August, starting in an EFL Cup first round 1-0 home defeat to Stoke City. Eleven days later, he made his league debut for Wigan in a Championship away game at QPR. Lang came on as a substitute for Jamal Lowe in the 59th minute in a 3-1 loss

==== 2019/20 season: Shrewsbury Town (loan) ====
On 2 September, Lang joined EFL League One side Shrewsbury Town on a season-long loan. He scored his first goal in his second appearance, the winner in a 4–3 home victory over Southend United. In October 2019 he fractured his metatarsal in the 1-0 win at Tranmere Rovers and was ruled out for three months, before returning in January. He had scored 3 goals in 20 games for Shrewsbury by the time the COVID-19 pandemic curtailed the season in March. Shrewsbury finished 15th in League One based on Points Per Game (PPG) once the season was officially cut short.

==== First half of 2020/21 season: Motherwell (loan) ====
On 29 July 2020, 22-year-old Lang was again sent out on loan following Wigan entering administration and suffering relegation from the EFL Championship in the 2019/20 season, signing for Scottish Premiership team Motherwell on a one-year loan. He made his debut on 3 August, as a substitute away to Ross County, but was sent off late on as Motherwell lost 1–0. Lang went on to make 17 league appearances for Motherwell, scoring 3 league goals. He also played in European competition for the first time, playing 3 times in the UEFA Europa League and scoring twice (in a 5-1 home win over Glentoran, and in a 2-2 away draw with Coleraine). Wigan recalled him early on 6 January 2021.

==== First-team regular at Wigan Athletic ====
Lang scored his first goal for Wigan in his first game back from loan, as he started in a 3-3 draw away to Rochdale on 16 January 2021. He went on to play 23 times in the second half of Wigan's successful battle to avoid relegation from League One in the 2020/21 season, scoring 9 goals as Latics avoided relegation to League Two with two games remaining.

As Wigan's fortunes improved following the acquisition of the club by the Phoenix 2021 Limited consortium in March 2021, Lang signed a new long-term contract until the summer of 2025 in September 2021.

=== Portsmouth ===
On 29 January 2024, Lang signed for League One club Portsmouth for an undisclosed fee, signing a two-and-a-half-year contract with the option for a further year. Lang scored on his debut away against Oxford. He then scored 4 goals on 21 December 2024; grabbing his first hat-trick for Portsmouth in a 4–1 home win over Coventry City in the Championship.

=== Preston North End ===
Lang joined Preston North End on 2 February 2026, for a "club record" undisclosed fee on a three-and-a-half-year deal.

== Career statistics ==
As of match played 3 November 2026

Appearances and goals by club, season and competition
Club	Season	League			National cup (Note: Includes FA Cup, Scottish Cup)		League cup (Note: Includes EFL Cup, Scottish League Cup)		Europe		Other		Total	
Club	Season	Division	Apps	Goals	Apps	Goals	Apps	Goals	Apps	Goals	Apps	Goals	Apps	Goals
Wigan Athletic	2017–18	League One	0	0	0	0	2	0	—		1 (Note: Appearances in the Football League Trophy)	0	3	0
Wigan Athletic	2018–19	Championship	0	0	0	0	0	0	—		—		0	0
Wigan Athletic	2019–20	Championship	1	0	0	0	1	0	—		—		2	0
Wigan Athletic	2020–21	League One	23	9	0	0	0	0	—		0	0	23	9
Wigan Athletic	2021–22	League One	42	15	4	3	2	0	—		1	0	49	18
Wigan Athletic	2022–23	Championship	35	1	2	0	0	0	—		—		37	1
Wigan Athletic	2023–24	League One	23	2	2	0	1	0	—		3	1	29	3
Wigan Athletic	Total		124	27	8	3	6	0	0	0	5	1	143	31
Morecambe (loan)	2017–18	League Two	30	10	1	0	0	0	—		0	0	31	10
Oldham Athletic (loan)	2018–19	League Two	42	13	4	2	0	0	—		4	1	50	16
Shrewsbury Town (loan)	2019–20	League One	16	3	4	0	0	0	—		0	0	20	3
Motherwell (loan)	2020–21	Scottish Premiership	17	3	0	0	1	0	3 (Note: Appearances in the UEFA Europa League)	2	—		21	5
Portsmouth	2023–24	League One	12	4	0	0	0	0	—		—		12	4
Portsmouth	2024–25	Championship	32	10	0	0	1	0	—		—		33	10
Portsmouth	2025–26	Championship	8	2	0	0	0	0	—		—		8	2
Portsmouth	Total		52	16	0	0	1	0	0	0	0	0	53	16
Preston North End	2025–26	Championship	5	0	—		—		—		—		5	0
Preston North End	2026–27	Championship	14	4	0	0	2	0	—		—		16	4
Preston North End	Total		19	4	0	0	2	0	—		—		21	4
Career total			300	76	17	5	10	0	3	2	9	2	339	85

== Personal life ==
Lang was born in Liverpool and is a life-long supporter of Everton.

== Honours ==
Wigan Athletic

- EFL League One: 2021–22

Portsmouth

- EFL League One: 2023–24
