= Joe Piggott =

English footballer (born 1998)

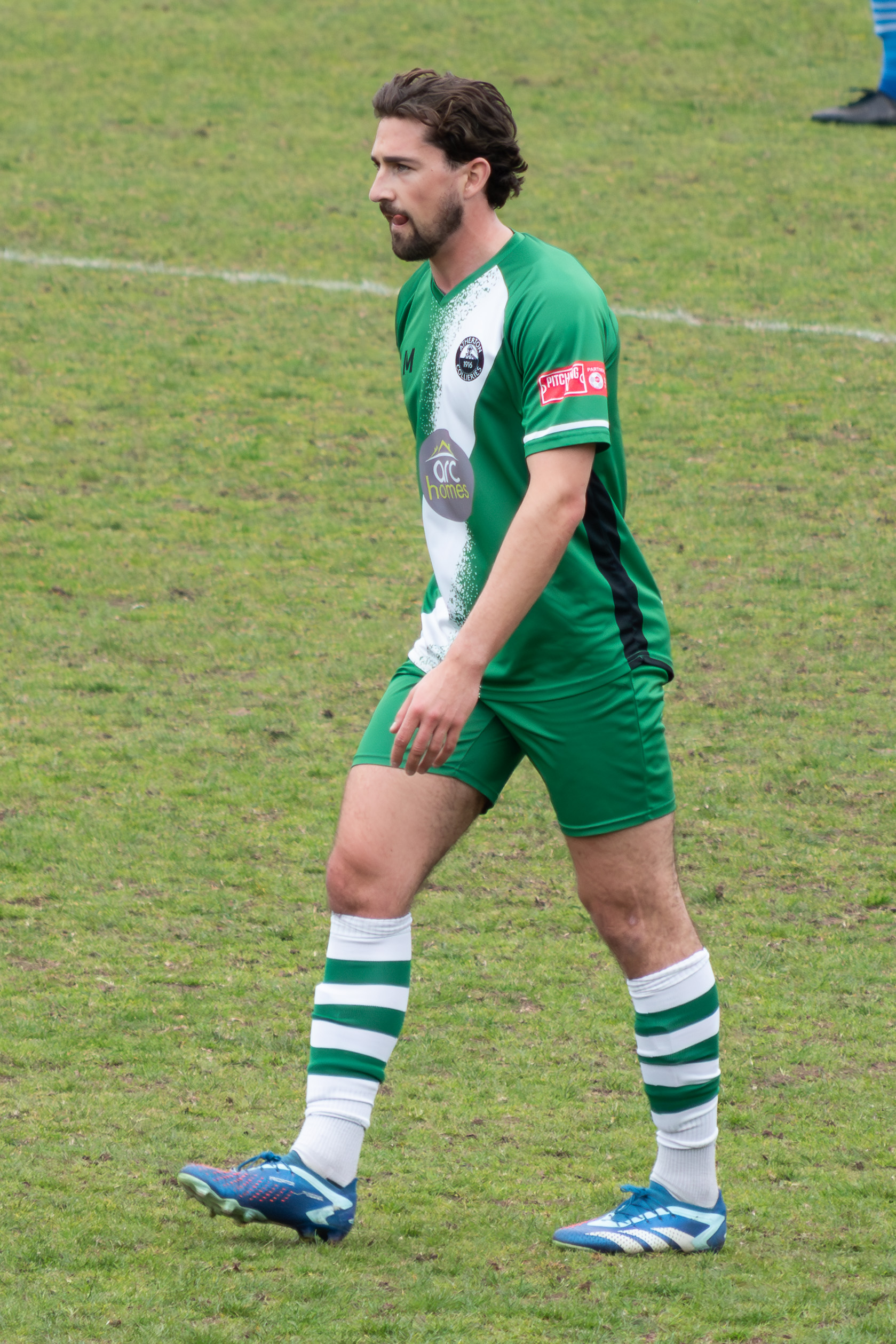
- Piggott playing for Atherton Collieries in 2025

Personal information
- Full name: Joe Piggott
- Date of birth: 23 June 1999 (age 27)
- Place of birth: Nantwich, England
- Positions: Midfielder; forward

Team information
- Current team: Atherton Collieries

Youth career
- –2014: Everton
- 2015–2017: Rochdale

Senior career*
Years	Team	Apps	(Gls)
2017–2018	Dundee United	1	(0)
2018	Warrington Town	20	(3)
2018–2021	Wigan Athletic	0	(0)
2018	→ Morecambe (loan)	6	(0)
2019	→ Altrincham (loan)	6	(4)
2019	→ Stockport County (loan)	2	(1)
2021	Altrincham	11	(0)
2021–2022	Fylde	12	(6)
2022–2023	Radcliffe	17	(2)
2023	Warrington Rylands	16	(1)
2023–2024	Nantwich Town	8	(1)
2024	Pascoe Vale		
2025–	Atherton Collieries	1	(0)
- * Club domestic league appearances and goals as of 19:54, 2 February 2025 (UTC)

Joe Piggott (born 23 June 1998) is an English professional footballer who plays as a forward or midfielder for Northern Premier League Division One West club Atherton Collieries.

He made his senior debut in 2017 for Dundee United and has also played for Warrington Town and Wigan Athletic. He has also spent time on loan with Morecambe, Altrincham and Stockport County.

== Club career ==
Born in Nantwich, Piggott had spells with Rochdale and the club he supported, Everton, before joining Scottish Championship club Dundee United in September 2017. He went onto make his first-team debut for United in a Scottish Challenge Cup tie against Alloa Athletic, playing for 71 minutes in a 3–1 victory.

After one further first team appearance for Dundee United, Piggott was released and returned to England, joining Northern Premier League club Warrington Town in January 2018. He scored an equalising goal on his debut in an FA Trophy defeat to National League South club Wealdstone. Four days later, he scored two goals against Matlock Town. Piggott's form at Warrington led to a transfer to EFL Championship club Wigan Athletic in August 2018.

After playing for Wigan's under-23 side in pre-season, Piggott was loaned to League Two club Morecambe until January 2019 and went onto make his debut during a 3–2 defeat to Bury. Three days later, he scored his first goal for the club during an EFL Trophy defeat to Carlisle United, giving Morecambe a 2–1 lead in the 24th minute.

Piggott first joined National League North club Altrincham on loan in January 2019, scoring his first goals for the club in a 6–0 win over Curzon Ashton. In September 2019 he went on loan again, joining Stockport County in the National League, before returning to Wigan later that month. On 22 January 2021, Piggott left Wigan Athletic by mutual consent.

On 30 January 2021, Piggott rejoined Altrincham, now in the National League, on a contract until the end of the 2021-22 season.

Piggott joined National League North side AFC Fylde on a short-term deal in August 2021, a deal that was renewed into a one-year deal in October with the club holding an option for another year. In October 2022, Piggott joined Radcliffe.

In February 2024, Piggott joined Victoria Premier League Division 2 club Pascoe Vale. He returned to England in January 2025, joining Atherton Collieries, a move which saw him reunite with former manager Michael Clegg.

== Career statistics ==
As of 30 January 2025

Appearances and goals by club, season and competition
Club	Season	League			National Cup		League Cup		Other		Total	
Club	Season	Division	Apps	Goals	Apps	Goals	Apps	Goals	Apps	Goals	Apps	Goals
Dundee United	2017–18	Scottish Championship	0	0	0	0	0	0	2 (Note: Appearance(s) in Scottish Challenge Cup)	0	2	0
Warrington Town	2017–18	Northern Premier League Premier Division	20	3	0	0	0	0	3 (Note: One appearance and one goal in FA Trophy, one appearance in Northern Premier League Challenge Cup, one appearance in Northern Premier League playoffs)	1	23	4
Wigan Athletic	2018–19	Championship	0	0	0	0	0	0	0	0	0	0
Wigan Athletic	2019–20	Championship	0	0	0	0	0	0	0	0	0	0
Wigan Athletic	2020–21	League One	0	0	0	0	0	0	0	0	0	0
Wigan Athletic	Total		0	0	0	0	0	0	0	0	0	0
Morecambe (loan)	2018–19	League Two	6	0	0	0	0	0	3 (Note: Appearance(s) in EFL Trophy)	1	9	1
Altrincham (loan)	2018–19	National League North	6	4	0	0	0	0	0	0	6	4
Stockport County (loan)	2019–20	National League	2	1	0	0	0	0	0	0	2	1
Altrincham	2020–21	National League	11	0	0	0	0	0	0	0	11	0
AFC Fylde	2021–22	National League North	12	6	0	0	—		0	0	12	6
Radcliffe	2022–23	Northern Premier League Premier Division	17	2	0	0	—		3 (Note: One appearance in Lancashire Senior Cup, two appearances in Manchester Premier Cup)	0	20	2
Warrington Rylands	2023–24	Northern Premier League Premier Division	16	1	1	0	—		1 (Note: Appearance(s) in FA Trophy)	0	18	1
Nantwich Town	2023–24	Northern Premier League Division One West	8	1	0	0	—		0	0	8	1
Career total			98	18	1	0	0	0	12	2	111	20
