= 2020–21 Wigan Athletic F.C. season =

Wigan Athletic
2020–21 season
- Owner: Phoenix 2021 Limited (from 30 March 2021)
- Chairman: Talal Al-Hammad (from 30 March 2021)
- Manager: Leam Richardson (caretaker until 11 September 2020); John Sheridan (11 September 2020–November 13, 2020); Leam Richardson (from 13 November 2020)
- Stadium: DW Stadium
- League One: 20th
- FA Cup: First round
- EFL Cup: First round
- EFL Trophy: Group stage
- Top goalscorer: League: Will Keane (11); All: Will Keane (12)
| Home colours | Away colours |

The 2020–21 season was Wigan Athletic Football Club's 89th season in existence and their first back in League One since 2017–18. In addition to the domestic league, Wigan Athletic participated in this season's editions of the FA Cup, EFL Cup, and EFL Trophy.

== Season summary ==
Due to the club's ongoing administration, there were initially concerns whether the club could begin the new season if the club was not sold to a new owner, but the English Football League (EFL) confirmed that the club would be able to start the season under administration. Prior to the start of the season, supporters raised £500,000 to help keep the club running until a buyer could be found. On 1 September, the club sold its training ground in Euxton to Preston North End for a fee of £1.6 million.

On 20 August 2020, the club's owner, Au Yeung Wai Kay, agreed to waive the £36 million debt owed to him by the club. On 30 September, an offer was accepted from a Spanish-based consortium led by businessman José Miguel Garrido Cristo, but the takeover was blocked by the EFL on 4 December, as the prospective owners had "failed to satisfy their requirements". A revised bid was submitted, led by CD Leganés president Felipe Moreno, but the takeover eventually fell through on 5 January. On 15 March, a bid was accepted from Phoenix 2021 Limited, owned by Bahraini businessman Abdulrahman Al-Jasmi. The takeover was completed at the end of March, with Talal Al-Hammad becoming the club's new chairman.

On 11 September, John Sheridan was appointed as manager as a replacement for Paul Cook, who had resigned at the end of the previous season. Sheridan left the club two months later to become manager of Swindon Town, with Leam Richardson taking charge for the remainder of the season.

The club managed to avoid a second successive relegation, finishing in 20th place.

== Transfers ==
=== Transfers in ===
| Date | Position | Nationality | Name | From | Fee | Ref. |
|---|---|---|---|---|---|---|
| 4 September 2020 | AM | (England) | Dan Gardner | (England) Salford City | Free transfer | |
| 4 September 2020 | RW | (Nigeria) | Viv Solomon-Otabor | (Bulgaria) CSKA Sofia | Free transfer | |
| 11 September 2020 | RB | (England) | Josh Clarke | (England) Brentford | Free transfer | |
| 18 September 2020 | CB | (England) | Nathan Cameron | (England) Macclesfield Town | Free transfer | |
| 9 October 2020 | CF | (England) | Will Keane | (England) Ipswich Town | Free transfer | |
| 11 January 2021 | RB | (Zimbabwe) | Tendayi Darikwa | (England) Nottingham Forest | Free transfer | |
| 22 January 2021 | SS | (England) | Zach Clough | (England) Nottingham Forest | Free transfer | |
| 22 January 2021 | RB | (Republic of Ireland) | Corey Whelan | (United States) Phoenix Rising | Free transfer | |
| 9 February 2021 | LW | (Ghana) | Joe Dodoo | (Turkey) Ankara Keçiörengücü | Free transfer | |

=== Loans in ===
| Date | Position | Nationality | Name | From | Date until | Ref. |
|---|---|---|---|---|---|---|
| 17 September 2020 | RB | (Wales) | Tom James | (Scotland) Hibernian | 17 January 2021 | |
| 29 September 2020 | CB | (England) | Darnell Johnson | (England) Leicester City | 4 January 2021 | |
| 15 October 2020 | CB | (England) | Curtis Tilt | (England) Rotherham United | End of season | |
| 16 October 2020 | CM | (England) | Matt Palmer | (England) Swindon Town | 4 January 2021 | |
| 22 January 2021 | CB | (Scotland) | George Johnston | (Netherlands) Feyenoord | End of season | |
| 28 January 2021 | CM | (Belgium) | Funso Ojo | (Scotland) Aberdeen | End of season | |
| 1 February 2021 | CF | (England) | Jamie Proctor | (England) Rotherham United | End of season | |
| 1 February 2021 | CB | (England) | Scott Wootton | (England) Plymouth Argyle | End of season | |

=== Transfers out ===
| Date | Position | Nationality | Name | To | Fee | Ref. |
|---|---|---|---|---|---|---|
| 23 July 2020 | GK | (England) | James Aspinall | Free agent | Released | |
| 23 July 2020 | DM | (England) | Will McGuffie | Free agent | Released | |
| 23 July 2020 | CM | (England) | Jensen Weir | (England) Brighton & Hove Albion | £500,000 | |
| 24 July 2020 | CB | (Nigeria) | Leon Balogun | (Scotland) Rangers | Free transfer | |
| 28 July 2020 | CM | (England) | Alfie Devine | (England) Tottenham Hotspur | £500,000 | |
| 30 July 2020 | GK | (Hungary) | Dániel Gyollai | (England) Peterborough United | Free transfer | |
| 10 August 2020 | CF | (England) | Joe Gelhardt | (England) Leeds United | Undisclosed | |
| 13 August 2020 | CB | (Jamaica) | Chey Dunkley | (England) Sheffield Wednesday | Free transfer | |
| 13 August 2020 | CF | (Wales) | Kieffer Moore | (Wales) Cardiff City | Undisclosed | |
| 17 August 2020 | CM | (Scotland) | Lewis Macleod | (England) Plymouth Argyle | Free transfer | |
| 20 August 2020 | CM | (England) | Joe Williams | (England) Bristol City | £1,200,000 | |
| 20 August 2020 | LB | (United States) | Antonee Robinson | (England) Fulham | £2,000,000 | |
| 21 August 2020 | GK | (Scotland) | David Marshall | (England) Derby County | Undisclosed | |
| 27 August 2020 | RW | (England) | Jamal Lowe | (Wales) Swansea City | £800,000 | |
| 31 August 2020 | RB | (United States) | Tylor Golden | (England) Salford City | Free transfer | |
| 2 September 2020 | AM | (England) | Josh Windass | (England) Sheffield Wednesday | Undisclosed | |
| 4 September 2020 | CB | (France) | Cédric Kipré | (England) West Bromwich Albion | £1,000,000 | |
| 10 September 2020 | RB | (England) | Nathan Byrne | (England) Derby County | Undisclosed | |
| 11 September 2020 | CM | (Egypt) | Sam Morsy | (England) Middlesbrough | Undisclosed | |
| 14 September 2020 | LM | (England) | Michael Jacobs | (England) Portsmouth | Free transfer | |
| 5 October 2020 | RB | (England) | Josh Clarke | Free agent | Released | |
| 17 October 2020 | LW | (Republic of Ireland) | Anthony Pilkington | (India) East Bengal | Free transfer | |
| 18 October 2020 | CB | (Scotland) | Danny Fox | (India) East Bengal | Free transfer | |
| 27 November 2020 | LW | (England) | Gary Roberts | (Wales) Bala Town | Free transfer | |
| 1 January 2021 | CF | (England) | Joe Garner | (Cyprus) APOEL Nicosia | Free transfer | |
| 5 January 2021 | CB | (England) | Nathan Cameron | (England) Solihull Moors | Free transfer | |
| 15 January 2021 | LW | (Scotland) | Kal Naismith | (England) Luton Town | Free transfer | |
| 18 January 2021 | LB | (England) | Patrick Webber | Free agent | Mutual consent | |
| 25 January 2021 | CF | (England) | Charlie Jolley | (England) Tranmere Rovers | Undisclosed | |
| 28 January 2021 | LW | (Democratic Republic of the Congo) | Divin Baningime | Free agent | Mutual consent | |
| 30 January 2021 | CF | (England) | Joe Piggott | (England) Altrincham | Free transfer | |
| 1 February 2021 | RW | (England) | Ollie Crankshaw | (England) Bradford City | Undisclosed | |
| 16 February 2021 | CB | (Nigeria) | Emeka Obi | (England) AFC Fylde | Free transfer | |

=== Loans out ===
| Date from | Position | Nationality | Name | To | Date until | Ref. |
|---|---|---|---|---|---|---|
| 29 July 2020 | CF | (England) | Callum Lang | (Scotland) Motherwell | 31 December 2020 | |
| 27 October 2020 | CB | (England) | Jack Sanders | (England) AFC Fylde | 9 February 2021 | |
| 9 December 2020 | GK | (Republic of Ireland) | Bobby Jones | (England) Warrington Town | End of season | |

== Pre-season and friendlies ==
Win Draw Loss

| 22 August 2020 Friendly | Wigan Athletic | 1–2 | Carlisle United | Euxton |
| | Crankshaw 48' | Report | Touré 40'; Alessandra 58' | Stadium: Euxton Training Ground; Attendance: Behind closed doors |

| 25 August 2020 Friendly | Wigan Athletic | 5–1 | Bolton Wanderers | Euxton |
| | McManaman 5'; Garner 31', 51', 52'; Trialist 82' | Report | Delfouneso 6' | Stadium: Euxton Training Ground; Attendance: Behind closed doors |

| 29 August 2020 Friendly | Bradford City | 2–3 | Wigan Athletic | Bradford |
| | Scales 19'; Pritchard 81' | Report | Naismith 1', 55'; Roberts 35' | Stadium: Valley Parade; Attendance: Behind closed doors |

== Competitions ==
=== Overview ===
| Competition | First match | Last match | Starting round | Final position | Record | | | | | | | |
| Competition | First match | Last match | Starting round | Final position | Pld | W | D | L | GF | GA | GD | Win % |
|---|---|---|---|---|---|---|---|---|---|---|---|---|
| EFL League One | 13 September 2020 | 9 May 2021 | Matchday 1 | 20th | 46 | 13 | 9 | 24 | 54 | 77 | −23 | 28.26 |
| FA Cup | 8 November 2020 | | First round | First round | 1 | 0 | 0 | 1 | 2 | 3 | −1 | 0.00 |
| EFL Cup | 5 September 2020 | | First round | First round | 1 | 0 | 0 | 1 | 2 | 3 | −1 | 0.00 |
| EFL Trophy | 22 September 2020 | 11 November 2020 | Group stage | Group stage | 3 | 1 | 1 | 1 | 9 | 6 | +3 | 33.33 |
| Total | | | | | 51 | 14 | 10 | 27 | 67 | 89 | −22 | 27.45 |

Source: Competitions

=== EFL League One ===
==== League table ====
| Pos | Team | Pld | W | D | L | GF | GA | GD | Pts | Promotion, qualification or relegation |
|---|---|---|---|---|---|---|---|---|---|---|
| 16 | Burton Albion | 46 | 15 | 12 | 19 | 61 | 73 | −12 | 57 | |
| 17 | Shrewsbury Town | 46 | 13 | 15 | 18 | 50 | 57 | −7 | 54 | |
| 18 | Plymouth Argyle | 46 | 14 | 11 | 21 | 53 | 80 | −27 | 53 | |
| 19 | AFC Wimbledon | 46 | 12 | 15 | 19 | 54 | 70 | −16 | 51 | |
| 20 | Wigan Athletic | 46 | 13 | 9 | 24 | 54 | 77 | −23 | 48 | |
| 21 | Rochdale (R) | 46 | 11 | 14 | 21 | 61 | 78 | −17 | 47 | Relegation to EFL League Two |
| 22 | Northampton Town (R) | 46 | 11 | 12 | 23 | 41 | 67 | −26 | 45 | Relegation to EFL League Two |
| 23 | Swindon Town (R) | 46 | 13 | 4 | 29 | 55 | 89 | −34 | 43 | Relegation to EFL League Two |
| 24 | Bristol Rovers (R) | 46 | 10 | 8 | 28 | 40 | 70 | −30 | 38 | Relegation to EFL League Two |

Source: EFL Official Website
Rules for classification: 1) Points; 2) Goal difference; 3) Number of goals scored; 4) Head-to-head results; 5) Wins; 6) Away goals; 7) Penalty points (sec 9.5); 8) 12-point sending off offences
(R) Relegated

==== Results summary ====
| Overall | | | | | | | | Home | | | | | | Away | | | | | |
| Pld | W | D | L | GF | GA | GD | Pts | W | D | L | GF | GA | GD | W | D | L | GF | GA | GD |
|---|---|---|---|---|---|---|---|---|---|---|---|---|---|---|---|---|---|---|---|
| 46 | 13 | 9 | 24 | 54 | 77 | −23 | 48 | 5 | 6 | 11 | 23 | 38 | −15 | 8 | 3 | 13 | 31 | 39 | −8 |

Source: BBC

                                               SHOULD READ

     HOME RECORD   WON 5 DRAWN 6 LOST  12   FOR 26 - AG 42     AWAY RECORD  WON 8 DRAWN 3 LOST 12  FOR 28  AG 35

==== Results by round ====
| Round | 1 | 2 | 3 | 4 | 5 | 6 | 7 | 8 | 9 | 10 | 11 | 12 | 13 | 14 | 15 | 16 | 17 | 18 | 19 | 20 | 21 | 22 | 23 | 24 | 25 | 26 | 27 | 28 | 29 | 30 | 31 | 32 | 33 | 34 | 35 | 36 | 37 | 38 | 39 | 40 | 41 | 42 | 43 | 44 | 45 | 46 |
|---|---|---|---|---|---|---|---|---|---|---|---|---|---|---|---|---|---|---|---|---|---|---|---|---|---|---|---|---|---|---|---|---|---|---|---|---|---|---|---|---|---|---|---|---|---|---|
| Ground | A | H | A | H | A | A | H | H | A | H | A | H | H | A | A | H | H | A | H | A | A | H | H | A | H | A | A | H | H | A | A | H | H | A | A | A | H | A | H | A | H | H | A | H | A | H |
| Result | L | L | W | W | L | L | L | D | L | L | L | L | D | L | W | W | L | D | D | W | D | D | L | L | L | W | L | L | L | W | L | L | W | W | D | L | D | L | L | W | W | W | W | D | L | L |
| Position | 24 | 23 | 17 | 10 | 16 | 18 | 21 | 18 | 19 | 21 | 24 | 23 | 24 | 24 | 24 | 23 | 23 | 23 | 23 | 22 | 22 | 22 | 23 | 23 | 23 | 21 | 22 | 23 | 23 | 22 | 23 | 24 | 23 | 20 | 20 | 21 | 22 | 22 | 23 | 21 | 20 | 20 | 20 | 20 | 20 | 20 |

A = Away; H = Home; W = Win; D = Draw; L = Loss

==== Matches ====
The 2020/21 season fixtures were released on 21 August.

| 13 September 2020 1 | Ipswich Town | 2–0 | Wigan Athletic | Ipswich |
| 12:00 BST | Bishop 11'; Chambers (yellow card) 61'; Edwards 80' | Report | | Stadium: Portman Road; Attendance: 0 Referee: Thomas Bramall |

| 19 September 2020 2 | Wigan Athletic | 2–3 | Gillingham | Wigan |
| 15:00 BST | Fox (yellow card) 13'; Garner 21'; Naismith 64'; Cameron (yellow card) 89' | Report | Graham 22', 30'; Eccles (yellow card) 34'; Coyle 62' | Stadium: DW Stadium; Attendance: 0 Referee: Tom Nield |

| 26 September 2020 3 | Portsmouth | 1–2 | Wigan Athletic | Milton |
| 15:00 BST | Harrison 89' | Report | Garner (yellow card) 26'; Evans 39'; Cameron (yellow card) 48'; James 59' | Stadium: Fratton Park; Attendance: 0 Referee: Antony Coggins |

| 3 October 2020 4 | Wigan Athletic | 1–0 | Doncaster Rovers | Wigan |
| 15:00 BST | Garner 59' (yellow card) 81' | Report | Coppinger (yellow card) 28'; Richards (yellow card) 78' | Stadium: DW Stadium; Referee: Carl Boyeson |

| 10 October 2020 5 | Crewe Alexandra | 3–0 | Wigan Athletic | Crewe |
| 15:00 BST | Offord 27'; Pickering 40'; Mandron 59'; Wintle (yellow card) 61' | Report | | Stadium: Alexandra Stadium; Attendance: 0 Referee: Martin Coy |

| 17 October 2020 6 | Charlton Athletic | 1–0 | Wigan Athletic | Charlton |
| 15:00 BST | Gunter (yellow card) 23'; Watson (yellow card) 47'; Forster-Caskey 65'; Smyth (yellow card) 69' | Report | Keane (yellow card) 39'; Evans (yellow card) 64'; Massey (yellow card) 67'; James (yellow card) 85' | Stadium: The Valley; Attendance: 0 Referee: Ollie Yates |

| 20 October 2020 7 | Wigan Athletic | 0–1 | Peterborough United | Wigan |
| 19:00 BST | Massey (yellow card) 66' | Report | Butler (yellow card) 6'; Clarke-Harris 28' | Stadium: DW Stadium; Attendance: 0 Referee: Ross Joyce |

| 24 October 2020 8 | Wigan Athletic | 1–1 | Plymouth Argyle | Wigan |
| 15:00 BST | Tilt (yellow card) 41'; Keane 69' | Report | Hardie 34'; Edwards (yellow card) 70' | Stadium: DW Stadium; Attendance: 0 Referee: Scott Oldham |

| 27 October 2020 9 | Milton Keynes Dons | 2–0 | Wigan Athletic | Denbigh |
| 19:00 GMT | Sorinola (yellow card) 32'; Fraser 48' (pen.); Walker 52' | Report | Massey (yellow card) 55'; Crankshaw (yellow card) 68' | Stadium: Stadium:mk; Attendance: 0 Referee: Charles Breakspear |

| 31 October 2020 10 | Wigan Athletic | 2–3 | Northampton Town | Wigan |
| 15:00 GMT | Crankshaw (yellow card) 13'; Garner (yellow card) 40' (goal) 63' (pen.); James 75'; Pearce (yellow card) 77' | Report | Watson 13'; Hoskins 21'; Chukwuemeka 66'; Sowerby (yellow card) 81'; Mitchell (yellow card) 90+7' | Stadium: DW Stadium; Attendance: 0 Referee: Josh Smith |

| 3 November 2020 11 | Blackpool | 1–0 | Wigan Athletic | Blackpool |
| 19:00 GMT | Kaikai 47' | Report | | Stadium: Bloomfield Road; Attendance: 0 Referee: Ben Toner |

| 21 November 2020 12 | Wigan Athletic | 1–2 | Oxford United | Wigan |
| 15:00 GMT | James (yellow card) 82'; Aasgaard 89'; Merrie (yellow card) 90+3' | Report | Taylor 61'; Henry 86'; Rodríguez (yellow card) 90' | Stadium: DW Stadium; Attendance: 0 Referee: Paul Howard |

| 24 November 2020 13 | Wigan Athletic | 0–0 | Bristol Rovers | Wigan |
| 19:00 GMT | Tilt (yellow card) 61'; Merrie (yellow card) 72'; Perry (yellow card) 88' | Report | Hare (yellow card) 76' | Stadium: DW Stadium; Attendance: 0 Referee: James Bell |

| 1 December 2020 14 | Lincoln City | 2–1 | Wigan Athletic | Lincoln |
| 19:00 GMT | Grant 69' (yellow card) 75'; Hopper 83' | Report | Naismith 52'; Jones (yellow card) 59' | Stadium: LNER Stadium; Attendance: 0 Referee: Sam Purkiss |

| 5 December 2020 15 | Sunderland | 0–1 | Wigan Athletic | Sunderland |
| 15:00 GMT | Maguire (yellow card) 90+1' | Report | Joseph 16' | Stadium: Stadium of Light; Attendance: 0 Referee: Trevor Kettle |

| 12 December 2020 16 | Wigan Athletic | 4–3 | Accrington Stanley | Wigan |
| 15:00 GMT | James 14'; Gardner 19'; Keane 32' (pen.); Hughes 83' (o.g.) | Report | Conneely (yellow card) 45+3'; Pritchard 61'; Nottingham 65'; Hughes (yellow card) 81'; Burgess 86' | Stadium: DW Stadium; Attendance: 0 Referee: Marc Edwards |

| 15 December 2020 17 | Wigan Athletic | 0–5 | Rochdale | Wigan |
| 19:00 GMT | Long (yellow card) 37'; Perry (yellow card) 45'; Tilt (yellow card) 55'; James (yellow card) 61' | Report | Baah 4'; Lund 19' (yellow card) 60'; Dooley (yellow card) 52' (goal) 58'; Newby 64' (pen.), 90+2' | Stadium: DW Stadium; Attendance: 0 Referee: Graham Salisbury |

| 19 December 2020 18 | Fleetwood Town | 1–1 | Wigan Athletic | Fleetwood |
| 15:00 GMT | Andrew 28'; Leutwiler (yellow card) 77'; Rossiter (yellow card) 87'; Madden (yellow card) 90+4' | Report | Naismith (yellow card) 37'; Crankshaw 90+1' | Stadium: Highbury Stadium; Attendance: 0 Referee: James Oldham |

| 26 December 2020 19 | Wigan Athletic | 1–1 | Shrewsbury Town | Wigan |
| 15:00 GMT | Keane 47' (pen.) | Report | Whalley 66' | Stadium: DW Stadium; Attendance: 0 Referee: Seb Stockbridge |

| 29 December 2020 20 | Burton Albion | 3–4 | Wigan Athletic | Burton upon Trent |
| 18:30 GMT | O'Toole 13'; Brayford 25'; Hemmings 72' | Report | Joseph 19', 28', 73'; Keane 83' | Stadium: Pirelli Stadium; Attendance: 0 Referee: Sam Barrott |

| 16 January 2021 21 | Rochdale | 3–3 | Wigan Athletic | Rochdale |
| 15:00 GMT | Humphrys 7', 90+5'; McNulty (red card) 43'; Lund (yellow card) 48'; Beesley 58' | Report | Joseph 9'; Lang 16'; Perry (yellow card) 73'; Keane 77' | Stadium: Spotland; Attendance: 0 Referee: Bobby Madley |

| 23 January 2021 22 | Wigan Athletic | 0–0 | Fleetwood Town | Wigan |
| 15:00 GMT | | Report | | Stadium: DW Stadium; Attendance: 0 Referee: Declan Bourne |

| 26 January 2021 23 | Wigan Athletic | 0–5 | Blackpool | Wigan |
| 19:00 GMT | Darikwa (yellow card) 54' | Report | Ekpiteta 40'; Yates 42'; Virtue 53'; Simms 87', 90+1' | Stadium: DW Stadium; Attendance: 0 Referee: Darren Drysdale |

| 2 February 2021 24 | Swindon Town | 1–0 | Wigan Athletic | Swindon |
| 18:00 GMT | Pitman 17'; Palmer (yellow card) 54'; Conroy (red card) 65'; Thompson (yellow card) 83' | Report | Jones (yellow card) 52'; Merrie (yellow card) 78' | Stadium: The County Ground; Attendance: 0 Referee: David Rock |

| 6 February 2021 25 | Wigan Athletic | 2–3 | AFC Wimbledon | Wigan |
| 15:00 GMT | Tilt 45+2'; Proctor 68'; Merrie (yellow card) 71' | Report | Rudoni 22', (yellow card) 68'; Pigott 30', 76' (pen.); Nightingale (yellow card) 59'; Chislett (yellow card) 81' | Stadium: DW Stadium; Attendance: 0 Referee: Andy Haines |

| 9 February 2021 26 | Northampton Town | 0–1 | Wigan Athletic | Northampton |
| 19:00 GMT | Sowerby (yellow card) 34'; Bolger (yellow card) 41'; Kioso (yellow card) 65' | Report | Tilt (yellow card) 64'; Lang 82'; Keane (yellow card) 83' Leam Richardson (yellow card) | Stadium: PTS Academy Stadium; Attendance: 0 Referee: Marc Edwards |

| 14 February 2021 27 | Oxford United | 2–1 | Wigan Athletic | Oxford |
| 16:00 GMT | Winnall 72'; Moore 83' | Report | Lang 57' | Stadium: The Kassam Stadium; Attendance: 0 Referee: Brett Huxtable |

| 17 February 2021 28 | Wigan Athletic | 0–5 | Hull City | Wigan |
| 17:30 GMT | Johnston (yellow card) 55' | Report | Wilks 27', 32', 64'; Lewis-Potter 49'; Magennis 53' | Stadium: DW Stadium; Attendance: 0 Referee: James Oldham |

| 20 February 2021 29 | Wigan Athletic | 1–2 | Lincoln City | Wigan |
| 15:00 GMT | Lang 33'; Aasgaard (yellow card) 49'; Proctor (yellow card) 54'; Wootton (yellow card) 70'; Massey (yellow card) 90+1' | Report | Scully 34'; Jackson (yellow card) 70'; Hopper 73'; Palmer (yellow card) 89'; Johnson (yellow card) 90+5' | Stadium: DW Stadium; Attendance: 0 Referee: Trevor Kettle |

| 23 February 2021 30 | Bristol Rovers | 1–2 | Wigan Athletic | Bristol |
| 19:00 GMT | McCormick 69' | Report | Wootton (yellow card) 25', (goal) 90+5'; Lang 52'; Robinson (yellow card) 59'; Massey (yellow card) 88' | Stadium: Memorial Stadium; Attendance: 0 Referee: Carl Brook |

| 27 February 2021 31 | Peterborough United | 2–1 | Wigan Athletic | Peterborough |
| 15:00 GMT | Beevers (yellow card) 12'; Clarke-Harris 82', 85' (pen.), (yellow card) 85'; Dembélé (yellow card) 90+1' | Report | Robinson (yellow card) 49'; Aasgaard 72' | Stadium: Weston Homes Stadium; Attendance: 0 Referee: Thomas Bramall |

| 2 March 2021 32 | Wigan Athletic | 0–1 | Charlton Athletic | Wigan |
| 18:00 GMT | | Report | Aneke 19' | Stadium: DW Stadium; Attendance: 0 Referee: Sam Allison |

| 6 March 2021 33 | Wigan Athletic | 3–0 | Milton Keynes Dons | Wigan |
| 15:00 GMT | Johnston 23'; Tilt (yellow card) 36'; Lang 64'; Dodoo 70' | Report | Laird (yellow card) 90+1' | Stadium: DW Stadium; Attendance: 0 Referee: Anthony Backhouse |

| 9 March 2021 34 | Plymouth Argyle | 0–2 | Wigan Athletic | Plymouth |
| 19:00 GMT | Edwards (yellow card) 30' | Report | Solomon-Otabor 13'; Evans (yellow card) 16'; Tilt 32', (yellow card) 84'; Ojo (yellow card) 76'; Massey (yellow card) 88' | Stadium: Home Park; Attendance: 0 Referee: Gavin Ward |

| 16 March 2021 35 | AFC Wimbledon | 1–1 | Wigan Athletic | Wimbledon |
| 18:30 GMT | Dobson 79' | Report | Proctor 58' | Stadium: Plough Lane; Attendance: 0 Referee: Paul Howard |

| 20 March 2021 36 | Accrington Stanley | 3–1 | Wigan Athletic | Accrington |
| 15:00 GMT | Burgess 3'; Nottingham 15'; Charles 61' (pen.) (yellow card) 89'; Morgan (yellow card) 63' | Report | Lang 1' | Stadium: Wham Stadium; Attendance: 0 Referee: Ben Toner |

| 27 March 2021 37 | Wigan Athletic | 0–0 | Ipswich Town | Wigan |
| 15:00 GMT | Aasgaard (yellow card) 14'; Darikwa (yellow card) 64'; Lang (yellow card) 69' | Report | Woolfenden (yellow card) 68'; Chambers (yellow card) 87' | Stadium: DW Stadium; Attendance: 0 Referee: James Bell |

| 31 March 2021 38 | Gillingham | 1–0 | Wigan Athletic | Gillingham |
| 17:30 GMT | O'Keefe (yellow card) 49'; Dempsey (yellow card) 73'; Oliver 76'; Samuel (yellow card) 85' | Report | Proctor (yellow card) 51'; Robinson (yellow card) 90+3'; Tilt (yellow card) 90+6' | Stadium: Priestfield Stadium; Attendance: 0 Referee: Chris Sarginson |

| 5 April 2021 39 | Wigan Athletic | 0–1 | Portsmouth | Wigan |
| 15:00 BST | Ojo (yellow card) 34'; Robinson (yellow card) 41'; Tilt (yellow card) 90+4' | Report | Cannon 46'; Brown (yellow card) 90+6' | Stadium: DW Stadium; Attendance: 0 Referee: Tom Nield |

| 10 April 2021 40 | Doncaster Rovers | 1–4 | Wigan Athletic | Doncaster |
| 15:00 GMT | Anderson (yellow card) 43'; Richards 45+3'; Wright (yellow card) 85'; Gomes (yellow card) 90+5' | Report | Dodoo 3', (yellow card) 57'; Aasgaard 15'; Solomon-Otabor 33'; Keane 81'; Jones (yellow card) 85' | Stadium: The Keepmoat Stadium; Referee: Alan Young |

| 13 April 2021 41 | Wigan Athletic | 2–1 | Sunderland | Wigan |
| 18:00 BST | Keane (yellow card) 38', (goal) 42'; Lang (yellow card) 50', (goal) 58'; Robinson (yellow card) 90' | Report | Wyke 32'; O'Nien (yellow card) 46' | Stadium: DW Stadium; Attendance: 0 Referee: Gavin Ward |

| 17 April 2021 42 | Wigan Athletic | 2–0 | Crewe Alexandra | Wigan |
| 12:30 BST | Dodoo 15'; Darikwa (yellow card) 66'; Evans 72' (pen.) | Report | Beckles (red card) 70' | Stadium: DW Stadium; Attendance: 0 Referee: Declan Bourne |

| 20 April 2021 43 | Shrewsbury Town | 1–2 | Wigan Athletic | Shrewsbury |
| 19:00 BST | Vela (yellow card) 38'; Norburn 66'; Ebanks-Landell (yellow card) 76'; Whalley (yellow card) 90' | Report | Keane 27'; Lang 45+1'; Ojo (yellow card) 82'; Gardner (yellow card) 90+1' | Stadium: Montgomery Waters Meadow; Attendance: 0 Referee: David Rock |

| 24 April 2021 44 | Wigan Athletic | 1–1 | Burton Albion | Wigan |
| 15:00 BST | Keane 37' | Report | Powell (yellow card) 12', (goal) 16' | Stadium: DW Stadium; Attendance: 0 Referee: Charles Breakspear |

| 1 May 2021 45 | Hull City | 3–1 | Wigan Athletic | Kingston upon Hull |
| 15:00 BST | Lewis-Potter 17'; Honeyman 22', (yellow card) 79'; Smallwood (yellow card) 57'; Magennis 66' | Report | Dodoo 19', (yellow card) 45+1'; Lang (yellow card) 44' | Stadium: KCOM Stadium; Attendance: 0 Referee: Bobby Madley |

| 9 May 2021 46 | Wigan Athletic | 3–4 | Swindon Town | Wigan |
| 12:00 BST | Tilt 17', (red card) 66'; Keane 56', 60' | Report | Grounds (yellow card) 42'; Twine 59', 90+2'; Hope 77'; Smith 90' | Stadium: DW Stadium; Attendance: 0 Referee: Graham Salisbury |

=== FA Cup ===
The draw for the first round was made on Monday 26, October.

| 8 November 2020 First round | Wigan Athletic | 2–3 (a.e.t.) | Chorley | Wigan |
| 12:45 GMT | Garner 19'; James 34' (yellow card) 88'; Long (red card) 41'; Obi (yellow card) 102' | Report | Hall (yellow card) 8' (goal) 92'; Newby 48'; Cardwell 60' | Stadium: DW Stadium; Attendance: 0 Referee: Martin Coy |

=== EFL Cup ===
The first round draw was made on 18 August, live on Sky Sports, by Paul Merson.

| 5 September 2020 First round | Fleetwood Town | 3–2 | Wigan Athletic | Fleetwood |
| 15:00 BST | Saunders (yellow card) 29'; Evans 41', 77'; Morris 64' | Report | Garner 2', 31' (pen.); Obi (yellow card) 37'; Evans (yellow card) 72' | Stadium: Highbury Stadium; Attendance: 0 Referee: Seb Stockbridge |

=== EFL Trophy ===
The regional group stage draw was confirmed on 18 August.

| Pos | Div | Team | Pld | W | PW | PL | L | GF | GA | GD | Pts | Qualification |
|---|---|---|---|---|---|---|---|---|---|---|---|---|
| 1 | L2 | Port Vale | 3 | 2 | 1 | 0 | 0 | 7 | 3 | +4 | 8 | Advance to Round 2 |
| 2 | L2 | Tranmere Rovers | 3 | 1 | 1 | 1 | 0 | 5 | 4 | +1 | 6 | Advance to Round 2 |
| 3 | L1 | Wigan Athletic | 3 | 1 | 0 | 1 | 1 | 9 | 6 | +3 | 4 | |
| 4 | ACA | Liverpool U21 | 3 | 0 | 0 | 0 | 3 | 5 | 13 | −8 | 0 | |

Source: EFL.com

| 22 September 2020 Group stage | Wigan Athletic | 6–1 | Liverpool U21 | Wigan |
| 19:00 BST | Naismith 47'; Jolley 59', 66'; Crankshaw 79', 90+2'; Garner 81' (pen.) | Report | Clarkson 44' | Stadium: DW Stadium; Attendance: 0 Referee: Andy Haines |

| 6 October 2020 Group stage | Wigan Athletic | 1–3 | Port Vale | Wigan |
| 19:00 BST | Pearce 79' | Report | Robinson 13', 30'; Montaño 55' | Stadium: DW Stadium; Attendance: 0 Referee: Sam Barrott |

| 11 November 2020 Group stage | Tranmere Rovers | 2–2 (3–1 p) | Wigan Athletic | Birkenhead |
| 18:30 GMT | Woolery 45+1'; Morris 72' | Report | Keane 19'; McHugh 45+3' (yellow card) 90+1' | Stadium: Prenton Park; Attendance: 0 Referee: Ben Speedie |
| | Penalties |
| | Ferrier (penalty missed); Lloyd (penalty scored); Smith (penalty missed); Banks (penalty scored); Morris (penalty scored) | | James (penalty scored); Joseph (penalty missed); Perry (penalty missed); Crankshaw (penalty missed) |

== Statistics ==
=== Appearances & Goals ===
As of 9 May 2021

| No. | Pos | Nat | Player | Total | | League One | | FA Cup | | League Cup | | League Trophy | |
| No. | Pos | Nat | Player | Apps | Goals | Apps | Goals | Apps | Goals | Apps | Goals | Apps | Goals |
|---|---|---|---|---|---|---|---|---|---|---|---|---|---|
| 1 | GK | (England) ENG | Jamie Jones | 46 | 0 | 45+0 | 0 | 0+0 | 0 | 1+0 | 0 | 0+0 | 0 |
| 2 | DF | (Zimbabwe) ZIM | Tendayi Darikwa | 26 | 0 | 26+0 | 0 | 0+0 | 0 | 0+0 | 0 | 0+0 | 0 |
| 3 | DF | (England) ENG | Tom Pearce | 28 | 1 | 23+0 | 0 | 1+0 | 0 | 1+0 | 0 | 3+0 | 1 |
| 4 | DF | (England) ENG | Curtis Tilt | 36 | 3 | 36+0 | 3 | 0+0 | 0 | 0+0 | 0 | 0+0 | 0 |
| 5 | DF | (Scotland) SCO | George Johnston | 22 | 1 | 19+3 | 1 | 0+0 | 0 | 0+0 | 0 | 0+0 | 0 |
| 6 | DF | (Republic of Ireland) IRL | Corey Whelan | 8 | 0 | 2+6 | 0 | 0+0 | 0 | 0+0 | 0 | 0+0 | 0 |
| 7 | FW | (England) ENG | Zach Clough | 13 | 0 | 4+9 | 0 | 0+0 | 0 | 0+0 | 0 | 0+0 | 0 |
| 8 | MF | (Wales) WAL | Lee Evans | 24 | 2 | 21+0 | 2 | 0+0 | 0 | 1+0 | 0 | 2+0 | 0 |
| 9 | FW | (England) ENG | Callum Lang | 22 | 9 | 21+1 | 9 | 0+0 | 0 | 0+0 | 0 | 0+0 | 0 |
| 10 | FW | (England) ENG | Will Keane | 34 | 12 | 25+7 | 11 | 0+1 | 0 | 0+0 | 0 | 1+0 | 1 |
| 11 | FW | (England) ENG | Gavin Massey | 17 | 0 | 12+4 | 0 | 1+0 | 0 | 0+0 | 0 | 0+0 | 0 |
| 12 | MF | (Belgium) BEL | Funso Ojo | 23 | 0 | 23+0 | 0 | 0+0 | 0 | 0+0 | 0 | 0+0 | 0 |
| 14 | DF | (England) ENG | Scott Wootton | 13 | 1 | 12+1 | 1 | 0+0 | 0 | 0+0 | 0 | 0+0 | 0 |
| 15 | MF | (England) ENG | Dan Gardner | 40 | 1 | 20+16 | 1 | 1+0 | 0 | 0+1 | 0 | 2+0 | 0 |
| 16 | FW | (England) ENG | Jamie Proctor | 15 | 2 | 7+8 | 2 | 0+0 | 0 | 0+0 | 0 | 0+0 | 0 |
| 17 | FW | (Nigeria) NGA | Viv Solomon-Otabor | 31 | 2 | 25+3 | 2 | 0+0 | 0 | 1+0 | 0 | 1+1 | 0 |
| 20 | FW | (Ghana) GHA | Joe Dodoo | 20 | 4 | 12+8 | 4 | 0+0 | 0 | 0+0 | 0 | 0+0 | 0 |
| 22 | FW | (Scotland) SCO | Kyle Joseph | 19 | 5 | 12+6 | 5 | 1+0 | 0 | 0+0 | 0 | 0+0 | 0 |
| 23 | MF | (England) ENG | Chris Merrie | 31 | 0 | 24+2 | 0 | 1+0 | 0 | 1+0 | 0 | 3+0 | 0 |
| 24 | MF | (England) ENG | Alex Perry | 25 | 0 | 17+4 | 0 | 1+0 | 0 | 0+0 | 0 | 3+0 | 0 |
| 25 | GK | (Wales) WAL | Owen Evans | 5 | 0 | 1+0 | 0 | 1+0 | 0 | 0+0 | 0 | 3+0 | 0 |
| 26 | FW | (England) ENG | Charlie Jolley | 4 | 2 | 0+2 | 0 | 0+0 | 0 | 0+0 | 0 | 2+0 | 2 |
| 28 | FW | (England) ENG | Divin Baningime | 1 | 0 | 0+0 | 0 | 0+0 | 0 | 0+0 | 0 | 0+1 | 0 |
| 30 | MF | (Norway) NOR | Thelo Aasgaard | 35 | 3 | 13+20 | 3 | 0+1 | 0 | 0+0 | 0 | 1+0 | 0 |
| 32 | DF | (England) ENG | Adam Long | 17 | 0 | 10+3 | 0 | 1+0 | 0 | 1+0 | 0 | 2+0 | 0 |
| 34 | DF | (Scotland) SCO | Luke Robinson | 25 | 0 | 20+5 | 0 | 0+0 | 0 | 0+0 | 0 | 0+0 | 0 |
| 41 | MF | (England) ENG | Harry McHugh | 3 | 1 | 0+1 | 0 | 0+1 | 0 | 0+0 | 0 | 1+0 | 1 |
Players who have left the club:
| 2 | DF | (England) ENG | Nathan Byrne | 1 | 0 | 0+0 | 0 | 0+0 | 0 | 1+0 | 0 | 0+0 | 0 |
| 4 | MF | (Scotland) SCO | Danny Fox | 2 | 0 | 2+0 | 0 | 0+0 | 0 | 0+0 | 0 | 0+0 | 0 |
| 5 | DF | (England) ENG | Nathan Cameron | 2 | 0 | 2+0 | 0 | 0+0 | 0 | 0+0 | 0 | 0+0 | 0 |
| 6 | DF | (England) ENG | Darnell Johnson | 11 | 0 | 10+0 | 0 | 0+0 | 0 | 0+0 | 0 | 1+0 | 0 |
| 7 | MF | (Scotland) SCO | Kal Naismith | 14 | 3 | 12+0 | 2 | 0+0 | 0 | 1+0 | 0 | 0+1 | 1 |
| 12 | MF | (England) ENG | Matt Palmer | 10 | 0 | 10+0 | 0 | 0+0 | 0 | 0+0 | 0 | 0+0 | 0 |
| 14 | FW | (England) ENG | Joe Garner | 14 | 7 | 10+1 | 3 | 1+0 | 1 | 1+0 | 2 | 0+1 | 1 |
| 18 | MF | (England) ENG | Gary Roberts | 3 | 0 | 2+0 | 0 | 0+0 | 0 | 1+0 | 0 | 0+0 | 0 |
| 19 | FW | (England) ENG | Ollie Crankshaw | 24 | 3 | 2+17 | 1 | 0+1 | 0 | 0+1 | 0 | 3+0 | 2 |
| 27 | DF | (Wales) WAL | Tom James | 24 | 4 | 20+0 | 3 | 1+0 | 1 | 0+0 | 0 | 2+1 | 0 |
| 20 | DF | (Nigeria) NGA | Emeka Obi | 9 | 0 | 3+1 | 0 | 1+0 | 0 | 1+0 | 0 | 3+0 | 0 |

=== Disciplinary record ===
As of 9 May 2021

| Rank | No. | Nat. | Po. | Name | League One | | | FA Cup | | | League Cup | | | League Trophy | | | Total | | |
| Rank | No. | Nat. | Po. | Name | Booked | (yellow card) (yellow-red card) | Sent off (straight red) | Booked | (yellow card) (yellow-red card) | Sent off (straight red) | Booked | (yellow card) (yellow-red card) | Sent off (straight red) | Booked | (yellow card) (yellow-red card) | Sent off (straight red) | Booked | (yellow card) (yellow-red card) | Sent off (straight red) |
|---|---|---|---|---|---|---|---|---|---|---|---|---|---|---|---|---|---|---|---|
| 1 | 4 | (England) | CB | Curtis Tilt | 9 | 0 | 1 | 0 | 0 | 0 | 0 | 0 | 0 | 0 | 0 | 0 | 9 | 0 | 1 |
| 2 | 11 | (England) | LW | Gavin Massey | 6 | 0 | 0 | 0 | 0 | 0 | 0 | 0 | 0 | 0 | 0 | 0 | 6 | 0 | 0 |
| 3 | 34 | (Scotland) | LB | Luke Robinson | 5 | 0 | 0 | 0 | 0 | 0 | 0 | 0 | 0 | 0 | 0 | 0 | 5 | 0 | 0 |
| 4 | 23 | (England) | CM | Chris Merrie | 4 | 0 | 0 | 0 | 0 | 0 | 0 | 0 | 0 | 0 | 0 | 0 | 4 | 0 | 0 |
| 4 | 24 | (England) | DM | Alex Perry | 4 | 0 | 0 | 0 | 0 | 0 | 0 | 0 | 0 | 0 | 0 | 0 | 4 | 0 | 0 |
| 4 | ~~27~~ | (Wales) | RB | Tom James | 3 | 0 | 0 | 1 | 0 | 0 | 0 | 0 | 0 | 0 | 0 | 0 | 4 | 0 | 0 |
| 7 | 2 | (Zimbabwe) | RB | Tendayi Darikwa | 3 | 0 | 0 | 0 | 0 | 0 | 0 | 0 | 0 | 0 | 0 | 0 | 3 | 0 | 0 |
| 7 | 8 | (Wales) | DM | Lee Evans | 2 | 0 | 0 | 0 | 0 | 0 | 1 | 0 | 0 | 0 | 0 | 0 | 3 | 0 | 0 |
| 7 | 9 | (England) | CF | Callum Lang | 3 | 0 | 0 | 0 | 0 | 0 | 0 | 0 | 0 | 0 | 0 | 0 | 3 | 0 | 0 |
| 7 | 10 | (England) | CF | Will Keane | 3 | 0 | 0 | 0 | 0 | 0 | 0 | 0 | 0 | 0 | 0 | 0 | 3 | 0 | 0 |
| 7 | 12 | (Belgium) | DM | Funso Ojo | 3 | 0 | 0 | 0 | 0 | 0 | 0 | 0 | 0 | 0 | 0 | 0 | 3 | 0 | 0 |
| 7 | ~~14~~ | (England) | CF | Joe Garner | 3 | 0 | 0 | 0 | 0 | 0 | 0 | 0 | 0 | 0 | 0 | 0 | 3 | 0 | 0 |
| 13 | 1 | (England) | GK | Jamie Jones | 2 | 0 | 0 | 0 | 0 | 0 | 0 | 0 | 0 | 0 | 0 | 0 | 2 | 0 | 0 |
| 13 | ~~5~~ | (England) | CB | Nathan Cameron | 2 | 0 | 0 | 0 | 0 | 0 | 0 | 0 | 0 | 0 | 0 | 0 | 2 | 0 | 0 |
| 13 | 14 | (England) | CB | Scott Wootton | 2 | 0 | 0 | 0 | 0 | 0 | 0 | 0 | 0 | 0 | 0 | 0 | 2 | 0 | 0 |
| 13 | 16 | (England) | CF | Jamie Proctor | 2 | 0 | 0 | 0 | 0 | 0 | 0 | 0 | 0 | 0 | 0 | 0 | 2 | 0 | 0 |
| 13 | 19 | (England) | RW | Ollie Crankshaw | 2 | 0 | 0 | 0 | 0 | 0 | 0 | 0 | 0 | 0 | 0 | 0 | 2 | 0 | 0 |
| 13 | 20 | (Ghana) | LW | Joe Dodoo | 2 | 0 | 0 | 0 | 0 | 0 | 0 | 0 | 0 | 0 | 0 | 0 | 2 | 0 | 0 |
| 13 | ~~20~~ | (Nigeria) | CB | Emeka Obi | 0 | 0 | 0 | 1 | 0 | 0 | 1 | 0 | 0 | 0 | 0 | 0 | 2 | 0 | 0 |
| 13 | 30 | (Norway) | AM | Thelo Aasgaard | 2 | 0 | 0 | 0 | 0 | 0 | 0 | 0 | 0 | 0 | 0 | 0 | 2 | 0 | 0 |
| 13 | 32 | (England) | CB | Adam Long | 1 | 0 | 0 | 0 | 0 | 1 | 0 | 0 | 0 | 0 | 0 | 0 | 1 | 0 | 1 |
| 21 | 3 | (England) | LB | Tom Pearce | 1 | 0 | 0 | 0 | 0 | 0 | 0 | 0 | 0 | 0 | 0 | 0 | 1 | 0 | 0 |
| 21 | ~~4~~ | (Scotland) | CB | Danny Fox | 1 | 0 | 0 | 0 | 0 | 0 | 0 | 0 | 0 | 0 | 0 | 0 | 1 | 0 | 0 |
| 21 | 5 | (England) | CB | George Johnston | 1 | 0 | 0 | 0 | 0 | 0 | 0 | 0 | 0 | 0 | 0 | 0 | 1 | 0 | 0 |
| 21 | ~~7~~ | (Scotland) | RM | Kai Naismith | 1 | 0 | 0 | 0 | 0 | 0 | 0 | 0 | 0 | 0 | 0 | 0 | 1 | 0 | 0 |
| 21 | 15 | (England) | AM | Dan Gardner | 1 | 0 | 0 | 0 | 0 | 0 | 0 | 0 | 0 | 0 | 0 | 0 | 1 | 0 | 0 |
| 21 | 41 | (England) | CM | Harry McHugh | 0 | 0 | 0 | 0 | 0 | 0 | 0 | 0 | 0 | 1 | 0 | 0 | 1 | 0 | 0 |
| Total | | | | | 69 | 0 | 1 | 2 | 0 | 1 | 2 | 0 | 0 | 1 | 0 | 0 | 74 | 0 | 2 |
