= Emeka Obi =

Nigerian footballer

Personal information
- Full name: Chukwuemeka David Obi
- Date of birth: 6 June 2001 (age 25)
- Place of birth: Lagos, Nigeria
- Height: 1.95 m (6 ft 5 in)
- Position: Defender

Team information
- Current team: Forest Green Rovers
- Number: 6

Youth career
- –2016: Bury

Senior career*
Years	Team	Apps	(Gls)
2016	Bury	0	(0)
2016–2017	Liverpool	0	(0)
2017–2021	Wigan Athletic	4	(0)
2021–2025	AFC Fylde	95	(5)
2025–2026	Kidderminster Harriers	44	(7)
2026–	Forest Green Rovers	1	(0)
- * Club domestic league appearances and goals as of 16:51, 14 August 2026 (UTC)

Chukwuemeka David Obi (born 6 June 2001) is a Nigerian professional footballer who plays as a defender for National League side Forest Green Rovers.

== Career ==
Aged 15 years and 86 days, he made his professional debut in a Football League Trophy match for Bury on 30 August 2016, coming on as an 85th-minute substitute in a 4–1 win over to Morecambe becoming the youngest player in the club's history.

In October 2016, Obi moved to Liverpool for a six figure fee plus performance based add ons. Despite the move, he did not appear on Liverpool's Under 18 squad lists for the 2016–17 or 2017–18 seasons.

Between September and December 2017 he appeared a number of times for Wigan Athletic's Under 18 squad, scoring in two matches. At the start of the 2018–19 season he was again featuring for Wigan.

In November 2018, he signed his first professional contract with Wigan Athletic.

On 1 February 2021, Obi left Wigan Athletic via mutual consent.

On 16 February 2021, Obi joined National League North side AFC Fylde on a non-contract basis.

On 11 June 2025, Obi joined National League North club Kidderminster Harriers.

On 3 July 2026, Obi joined National League club Forest Green Rovers. He suffered an anterior cruciate ligament injury in the 37th minute of his debut for the club, expected to rule him out for between six and nine months.

== Career statistics ==
As of end of 2024–25 season

Club	Season	Division	League		FA Cup		League Cup		Other (Note: Includes other competitive competitions, including the Football League Trophy)		Total	
Club	Season	Division	Apps	Goals	Apps	Goals	Apps	Goals	Apps	Goals	Apps	Goals
Bury	2016–17	League One	0	0	0	0	0	0	1 (Note: Appearances in the EFL Trophy)	0	1	0
Wigan Athletic	2018–19	Championship	0	0	0	0	0	0	0	0	0	0
Wigan Athletic	2019–20	Championship	0	0	0	0	0	0	0	0	0	0
Wigan Athletic	2020–21	League One	4	0	1	0	1	0	3	0	9	0
Wigan Athletic	Total		4	0	1	0	1	0	3	0	9	0
AFC Fylde	2020–21	National League North	0	0	0	0	0	0	0	0	0	0
AFC Fylde	2021–22	National League North	24	1	0	0	—		2 (Note: Appearance(s) in FA Trophy)	1	26	2
AFC Fylde	2022–23	National League North	31	3	3	0	—		2	0	36	3
AFC Fylde	2023–24	National League	18	1	1	0	—		1	0	20	1
AFC Fylde	2024–25	National League	22	0	0	0	—		1	0	23	0
AFC Fylde	Total		95	5	4	0	0	0	6	1	105	6
Career total			99	5	5	0	1	0	10	1	115	6

== Honours ==
AFC Fylde

- National League North: 2022–23

Kidderminster Harriers

- National League North play-offs: 2026
