= Ollie Crankshaw =

English footballer (born 1998)

Personal information
- Full name: Oliver Samuel Crankshaw
- Date of birth: 12 August 1998 (age 28)
- Place of birth: Preston, England
- Height: 5 ft 10 in (1.78 m)
- Position: Winger

Team information
- Current team: Barrow
- Number: 7

Youth career
- –2016: Preston North End
- 2017–2018: Morecambe

Senior career*
Years	Team	Apps	(Gls)
2016–2017	Ramsbottom United	25	(14)
2017	Clitheroe	11	(1)
2017–2018	Colne	30	(14)
2018–2019	Curzon Ashton	21	(6)
2019–2021	Wigan Athletic	16	(1)
2019	→ Curzon Ashton (loan)	14	(4)
2020	→ Dundee (loan)	6	(1)
2021	Bradford City	25	(1)
2021–2023	Stockport County	54	(11)
2023	→ Motherwell (loan)	4	(0)
2023–2026	Altrincham	36	(9)
2026–	Barrow	3	(0)
- * Club domestic league appearances and goals as of 22:00, 31 August 2026 (UTC)

Oliver Samuel Crankshaw (born 12 August 1998) is an English professional footballer who plays as a winger for National League club Barrow.

== Career ==
Crankshaw started his career with Preston North End before joining Northern Premier sides Ramsbottom United and then Clitheroe. In October 2017 Crankshaw joined Colne where he caught the eye, scoring 13 goals in 30 appearances. During this time he also played for Morecambe's under-23 squad. His good form for Colne and Morecambe earned him a move to National League North side Curzon where he continued to impress leading to an extended trial with Championship side Wigan Athletic. In January 2019 Crankshaw signed for Wigan and returned to Curzon on loan for the remainder of the season.

In January 2020 Crankshaw was loaned out to Dundee for the remainder of the season. He scored his first goal for the club on 10 March at home against Ayr United, in what would be the final game of the season due to its early finish caused by the COVID-19 pandemic.

Crankshaw made his debut for The Latics in an EFL Cup match against Fleetwood Town in September 2020. He scored his first goals for Wigan when he scored twice in a 6–1 EFL Trophy win over Liverpool U21s on 22 September.

Crankshaw signed for Bradford City on 1 February 2021, and he scored on his debut for against Exeter City on 6 February.

He signed for Stockport County in September. and made his debut in a 2-1 win away to Weymouth on 2 October in which he scored the winning goal. Crankshaw would go on to win the National League with Stockport at the end of the season.

On 12 January 2023, Crankshaw would join Scottish Premiership club Motherwell on loan until the end of the season.

On 30 August 2023, Crankshaw signed for National League side Altrincham for an undisclosed fee. In September during a league match against Barnet, Crankshaw suffered an anterior cruciate ligament injury and was ruled out for the rest of the season.

On 20 September 2024, Crankshaw made his return to the pitch after over a year out injured, coming on as a substitute in a league game against Boston United.

On 16 June 2025, Crankshaw signed a new deal with Altrincham, vowing to "make up for lost time". He had a return to form in the 2025–26 season, scoring 10 goals for the Robins.

On 17 June 2026, Crankshaw joined National League club Barrow A.F.C. on a permanent deal.

== Career statistics ==
As of match played 31 August 2026

Club	Season	League			National Cup		League Cup		Other		Total	
Club	Season	Division	Apps	Goals	Apps	Goals	Apps	Goals	Apps	Goals	Apps	Goals
Ramsbottom United	2016–17	NPL Division One North	25	0	1	0	—		5 (Note: Four appearances and one goal in FA Trophy; one appearance in Northern Premier League Challenge Cup)	1	31	1
Clitheroe	2017–18	NPL Division One North	11	1	2	2	—		2 (Note: One appearance in FA Trophy; one appearance in Northern Premier League Challenge Cup)	0	15	3
Colne	2017–18	NPL Division One North	30	14	—		—		—		30	14
Curzon Ashton	2018-19	National League North	21	6	1	0	—		1 (Note: Appearances in Manchester Premier Cup)	0	23	6
Wigan Athletic	2018–19	Championship	0	0	0	0	0	0	0	0	0	0
Wigan Athletic	2019–20	Championship	0	0	0	0	0	0	0	0	0	0
Wigan Athletic	2020–21	League One	17	1	1	0	1	0	3 (Note: Appearances in EFL Trophy)	2	22	3
Wigan Athletic	Total		17	1	1	0	1	0	3	2	22	3
Curzon Ashton (loan)	2018–19	National League North	14	3	0	0	—		1	1	15	4
Dundee (loan)	2019–20	Scottish Championship	6	1	0	0	0	0	0	0	6	1
Bradford City	2020–21	League Two	19	1	0	0	0	0	0	0	19	1
Bradford City	2021–22	League Two	6	0	0	0	1	0	1	0	8	0
Bradford City	Total		25	1	—		1	0	1	0	27	1
Stockport County	2021–22	National League	32	10	4	1	—		5 (Note: Appearances in FA Trophy)	0	41	11
Stockport County	2022–23	League Two	19	1	4	0	2	0	2	0	27	1
Stockport County	2023–24	League Two	3	0	0	0	0	0	1	0	4	0
Stockport County	Total		54	11	8	1	2	0	8	0	72	12
Motherwell (loan)	2022–23	Scottish Premiership	4	0	2	0	—		0	0	6	0
Altrincham	2023–24	National League	2	0	0	0	0	0	0	0	2	0
Altrincham	2024–25	National League	6	0	1	0	0	0	1	0	8	0
Altrincham	2025–26	National League	28	9	1	0	0	0	1	1	30	10
Altrincham	Total		36	9	2	0	0	0	2	1	40	10
Barrow	2026–27	National League	3	0	0	0	0	0	0	0	3	0
Career total			246	47	17	3	4	0	23	5	290	55

== Honours ==
Stockport County

- National League: 2021–22
