= Divin Baningime =

Congolese footballer (born 2000)

Personal information
- Date of birth: 12 October 2000 (age 26)
- Place of birth: Kinshasa, DR Congo
- Height: 1.75 m (5 ft 9 in)
- Position: Forward

Youth career
- 2010–2017: Wigan Athletic

Senior career*
Years	Team	Apps	(Gls)
2017–2021	Wigan Athletic	0	(0)
2019	→ Curzon Ashton (loan)	4	(0)
2021–2022	Wigan Athletic	0	(0)
- * Club domestic league appearances and goals as of 22:40, 03 January 2021 (UTC)

Divin Baningime (born 13 October 2000) is a Congolese professional footballer who is a free agent. He last played as a forward for Wigan Athletic.

== Club career ==
Brother of Hearts midfielder Beni, Baningime joined Wigan Athletic at the age of nine in 2010. He made his first-team debut during their EFL Trophy tie against Middlesbrough U23s in October 2017. In October 2019 Baningime joined Curzon Ashton on loan.

On 28 January 2021, Baningime left Wigan Athletic after his contract was terminated by mutual consent.

On 8 September 2021, Baningime returned to Wigan Athletic on a short-term deal.

He scored his first professional goal on 25 January 2022 in a 1–0 win against Arsenal U21s which put his side into the semi-finals of the EFL Trophy.

== Career statistics ==
As of match played 25 January 2022

Club	Season	League			FA Cup		EFL Cup		Other		Total	
Club	Season	Division	Apps	Goals	Apps	Goals	Apps	Goals	Apps	Goals	Apps	Goals
Wigan Athletic	2017–18	League One	0	0	0	0	0	0	2 (Note: Appearances in the EFL Trophy)	0	2	0
Wigan Athletic	2018–19	Championship	0	0	0	0	0	0	0	0	0	0
Wigan Athletic	2019–20	Championship	0	0	0	0	0	0	0	0	0	0
Wigan Athletic	2020–21	League One	0	0	0	0	0	0	2	0	2	0
Wigan Athletic	2021–22	League One	0	0	0	0	0	0	3	1	3	1
Wigan Athletic	Total		0	0	0	0	0	0	7	1	7	1
Curzon Ashton (loan)	2019–20	National League North	4	0	0	0	0	0	0	0	4	0
Career total			4	0	0	0	0	0	7	1	11	1
