= 2019–20 Wigan Athletic F.C. season =

Wigan Athletic
2019–20 season
- Owner: International Entertainment Corporation
- Chairman: Darren Royle
- Manager: Paul Cook
- Stadium: DW Stadium
- Championship: 23rd (relegated)
- FA Cup: Third round
- EFL Cup: First round
- Top goalscorer: League: Kieffer Moore (9); All: Kieffer Moore (9)
Home colours	Away colours

The 2019–20 season was Wigan Athletic's 88th year in existence and their second consecutive season in the Championship. Along with competing in the league, the club also participated in the FA Cup and the EFL Cup. The season covered the period from 1 July 2019 to 22 July 2020.

== Season summary ==
On 4 June 2020, International Entertainment Corporation (IEC) sold the club to a Hong Kong based consortium, Next Leader Fund (NLF). A few weeks later, on 1 July 2020, Wigan announced the club had gone into administration. The story received national media attention; it was reported that Au Yeung Wai Kay, initially a minor shareholder of NLF, took full ownership of the club on 24 June, but on the same day withdrew all funding for the club, and approached Begbies Traynor about putting the club into administration. Au Yeung released a statement claiming he had the "best intentions" when buying the club, and blamed the COVID-19 pandemic as the reason for putting the club into administration. Wigan MP Lisa Nandy criticised the English Football League (EFL) for approving the takeover, and called for a full inquiry.

The EFL handed a 12-point penalty to the club as a result of entering administration. This, however, did not put a halt to their run of good form and on 14 July, Wigan defeated Hull City 8–0, the biggest league win in the club's history. Despite losing just once in their last fifteen games, Wigan were relegated to League One due to the points deduction. Shortly after the season finished, the club appealed unsuccessfully against the points deduction on the grounds of force majeure.

== First-team squad ==
No.	Name	Pos.	Nat.	Birth date
Goalkeepers
1	David Marshall	GK	(Scotland)	5 March 1985
23	Jamie Jones	GK	(England)	18 February 1989
29	Dániel Gyollai	GK	(Hungary)	7 April 1997
40	Owen Evans	GK	(Wales)	28 November 1996
Defenders
2	Nathan Byrne	RB	(England)	5 June 1992
3	Antonee Robinson	LB	(United States)	8 August 1997
6	Danny Fox	LB	(Scotland)	29 May 1986
12	Tom Pearce	LB	(England)	12 April 1998
15	Dujon Sterling	RB	(England)	24 October 1999
16	Charlie Mulgrew	CB	(Scotland)	6 March 1986
21	Cédric Kipré	CB	(Ivory Coast)	9 December 1996
22	Chey Dunkley	CB	(England)	13 February 1992
35	Emeka Obi	CB	(Nigeria)	6 June 2001
37	Leon Balogun	CB	(Nigeria)	28 June 1988
Midfielders
4	Lewis Macleod	CM	(Scotland)	16 June 1994
5	Sam Morsy	CM	(Egypt)	10 September 1991
7	Anthony Pilkington	LW	(Republic of Ireland)	6 June 1988
8	Lee Evans	CM	(Wales)	24 July 1994
10	Josh Windass	AM	(England)	9 January 1994
17	Michael Jacobs	LM	(England)	4 November 1991
18	Gary Roberts	AM	(England)	18 March 1984
20	Joe Williams	DM	(England)	8 December 1996
30	Kieran Dowell	AM	(England)	10 October 1997
31	Chris Merrie	CM	(England)	2 November 1998
33	Kal Naismith	RM	(Scotland)	18 February 1992
39	Jensen Weir	CM	(England)	31 January 2002
Forwards
9	Jamal Lowe	RW	(England)	21 July 1994
11	Gavin Massey	RW	(England)	4 October 1992
14	Joe Garner	CF	(England)	12 April 1988
19	Kieffer Moore	CF	(Wales)	8 August 1992
25	Alex Dobre	LW	(Romania)	30 August 1998
24	Callum Lang	CF	(England)	8 September 1998
27	Jan Mlakar	CF	(Slovenia)	23 October 1998
32	Charlie Jolley	CF	(England)	13 January 2001
38	Joe Gelhardt	CF	(England)	4 May 2002

== Transfers ==
=== Transfers in ===
Date	Position	Nationality	Name	From	Fee	Ref.
8 July 2019	GK	(Scotland)	David Marshall	(England) Hull City	Free transfer	
12 July 2019	CM	(Scotland)	Lewis Macleod	(England) Brentford	Free transfer	
15 July 2019	LB	(United States)	Antonee Robinson	(England) Everton	Undisclosed	
31 July 2019	DM	(England)	Joe Williams	(England) Everton	Undisclosed	
1 August 2019	RW	(England)	Jamal Lowe	(England) Portsmouth	Undisclosed	
1 August 2019	GK	(Hungary)	Dániel Gyollai	(England) Stoke City	Free transfer	
5 August 2019	CF	(Wales)	Kieffer Moore	(England) Barnsley	Undisclosed	
8 August 2019	LB	(England)	Tom Pearce	(England) Leeds United	Undisclosed	
12 August 2019	GK	(England)	James Aspinall	(England) Bolton Wanderers	Free transfer	
12 August 2019	CB	(England)	Jack Sanders	(England) Leek Town	Undisclosed	
12 August 2019	LB	(England)	Patrick Webber	(England) Ipswich Town	Free transfer	
25 June 2020	CB	(Nigeria)	Leon Balogun	(England) Brighton & Hove Albion	Free transfer	

=== Loans in ===
Date from	Position	Nationality	Name	From	Date until	Ref.
1 August 2019	RB	(England)	Dujon Sterling	(England) Chelsea	30 June 2020	
8 August 2019	CF	(Nigeria)	Bright Enobakhare	(England) Wolverhampton Wanderers	2 January 2020	
9 August 2019	CB	(Scotland)	Charlie Mulgrew	(England) Blackburn Rovers	15 January 2020	
3 January 2020	AM	(England)	Kieran Dowell	(England) Everton	23 July 2020	
31 January 2020	CB	(Nigeria)	Leon Balogun	(England) Brighton & Hove Albion	25 June 2020	
31 January 2020	CF	(Slovenia)	Jan Mlakar	(England) Brighton & Hove Albion	23 July 2020	
31 January 2020	LW	(Romania)	Alex Dobre	(England) AFC Bournemouth	23 July 2020	

=== Transfers out ===
Date	Position	Nationality	Name	To	Fee	Ref.
1 July 2019	CM	(Republic of Ireland)	Darron Gibson	(England) Salford City	Released	
1 July 2019	GK	(England)	Dan Lavercombe	(England) AFC Fylde	Released	
1 July 2019	CM	(Wales)	Shaun MacDonald	(England) Rotherham United	Released	
1 July 2019	RW	(England)	Callum McManaman	(England) Luton Town	Released	
1 July 2019	CB	(Sweden)	Jonas Olsson	Free agent	Released	
1 July 2019	GK	(England)	Jordan Perrin	(England) Sittingbourne	Released	
1 July 2019	SS	(England)	Nick Powell	(England) Stoke City	Free transfer	
1 July 2019	CF	(England)	James Vaughan	(England) Bradford City	Released	
1 July 2019	LW	(Scotland)	Jamie Walker	(Scotland) Heart of Midlothian	Free transfer	
1 July 2019	CB	(England)	Denzel Williams	Free agent	Released	
8 August 2019	CM	(Portugal)	Leonardo Lopes	(England) Hull City	Undisclosed	
19 August 2019	RB	(Spain)	Víctor Maffeo	(Spain) Girona	Free transfer	
11 November 2019	CF	(England)	James Berry	(England) Hull City	Undisclosed	
20 January 2020	CM	(England)	Luke Burgess	(England) Salford City	Free transfer	
27 January 2020	CF	(England)	Devante Cole	(England) Doncaster Rovers	Undisclosed	
30 January 2020	LB	(England)	Ryan Galvin	(England) Sheffield Wednesday	Free transfer	

=== Loans out ===
Date from	Position	Nationality	Name	To	Date until	Ref.
2 July 2019	CF	(England)	Devante Cole	(Scotland) Motherwell	4 January 2020	
25 July 2019	GK	(Wales)	Owen Evans	(England) Macclesfield Town	9 January 2020	
31 August 2019	GK	(England)	James Aspinall	(England) City of Liverpool F.C.	1 January 2020	
2 September 2019	SS	(England)	Callum Lang	(England) Shrewsbury Town	30 June 2020	
5 September 2019	CF	(England)	Joe Piggott	(England) Stockport County	5 October 2019	
12 October 2019	RW	(Democratic Republic of the Congo)	Divin Baningime	(England) Curzon Ashton	9 November 2019	
1 November 2019	DM	(England)	Will McGuffie	(England) Stafford Rangers	1 December 2019	
14 November 2019	CF	(England)	Charlie Jolley	(England) Curzon Ashton	14 January 2020	
14 November 2019	LB	(England)	Ryan Galvin	(England) Stafford Rangers	14 December 2019	
19 December 2019	CB	(England)	Jack Sanders	(England) Blyth Spartans	19 January 2020	
20 December 2019	RB	(United States)	Tylor Golden	(England) Nantwich Town	20 January 2020	
9 January 2020	GK	(Wales)	Owen Evans	(England) Cheltenham Town	30 June 2020	
23 January 2020	LW	(England)	Ollie Crankshaw	(Scotland) Dundee	30 June 2020	
31 January 2020	AM	(England)	Josh Windass	(England) Sheffield Wednesday	23 July 2020	
11 February 2020	GK	(Republic of Ireland)	Bobby Jones	(England) Farsley Celtic	18 February 2020	
14 February 2020	CB	(England)	Jack Sanders	(England) Southport	30 June 2020	
20 February 2020	CB	(England)	Adam Long	(England) Notts County	31 March 2020	
22 February 2020	GK	(Republic of Ireland)	Bobby Jones	(England) Warrington Town	21 March 2020	

== Pre-season ==
Wigan confirmed their pre-season schedule in June 2019.

6 July 2019 Friendly	Chester	1–7	Wigan Athletic	Chester
15:00 BST	Trialist 45'	Report	Windass 3'; Byrne 33'; Lang 34'; Garner 46', 58', 64'; Jolley 87'	Stadium: Swansway Chester Stadium

9 July 2019 Friendly	AFC Fylde	1–0	Wigan Athletic	Medlar-with-Wesham
19:45 BST	Rowe 79'	Report		Stadium: Mill Farm; Attendance: 880

20 July 2019 Friendly	Bradford City	1–1	Wigan Athletic	Bradford
15:00 BST	Vaughan 36' (pen.)	Report	Pilkington 47'	Stadium: Northern Commercials Stadium

24 July 2019 Friendly	Wigan Athletic	0–0	Everton	Wigan
19:45 BST		Report		Stadium: DW Stadium; Attendance: 13,196

27 July 2019 Friendly	Wigan Athletic	2–2	Burnley	Wigan
15:00 BST	Pilkington 28'; Gelhardt 67'	Report	Rodriguez 5'; McNeil 11'	Stadium: DW Stadium; Attendance: 3,376

== Competitions ==
=== Overall record ===
Competition	First match	Last match	Starting round	Final position	Record							
Competition	First match	Last match	Starting round	Final position	Pld	W	D	L	GF	GA	GD	Win %
Championship	3 August 2019	22 July 2020	Matchday 1	23rd	46	15	14	17	57	56	+1	32.61
FA Cup	4 January 2020	4 January 2020	Third round	Third round	1	0	0	1	0	2	−2	0.00
EFL Cup	13 August 2019	13 August 2019	First round	First round	1	0	0	1	0	1	−1	0.00
Total					48	15	14	19	57	59	−2	31.25

Last updated: 22 July 2020

=== League table ===
Pos	Team	Pld	W	D	L	GF	GA	GD	Pts	Promotion, qualification or relegation
19	Luton Town	46	14	9	23	54	82	−28	51	
20	Birmingham City	46	12	14	20	54	75	−21	50	
21	Barnsley	46	12	13	21	49	69	−20	49	
22	Charlton Athletic (R)	46	12	12	22	50	65	−15	48	Relegation to EFL League One
23	Wigan Athletic (R)	46	15	14	17	57	56	+1	47 (Note: As a result of Wigan Athletic entering administration, the club was subject to a 12-point deduction. In accordance with EFL regulations, the timing of the sporting sanction was only determined once final league placings in the Championship were determined. Since the club did not finish in the relegation places at the end of season, the sanction was applied to their 2019–20 total and final league standings were amended as appropriate.)	Relegation to EFL League One
24	Hull City (R)	46	12	9	25	57	87	−30	45	Relegation to EFL League One

Source: EFL Official Website
Rules for classification: 1) Points; 2) Goal difference; 3) Number of goals scored; 4) Head-to-head results; 5) Wins; 6) Away goals; 7) Penalty points (sec 9.5); 8) 12-point sending off offences
(R) Relegated

==== Results summary ====
Overall								Home						Away					
Pld	W	D	L	GF	GA	GD	Pts	W	D	L	GF	GA	GD	W	D	L	GF	GA	GD
46	15	14	17	57	56	+1	59	10	7	6	33	23	+10	5	7	11	24	33	−9

Last updated: 22 July 2020.
Source: BBC

==== Results by matchday ====
Matchday	1	2	3	4	5	6	7	8	9	10	11	12	13	14	15	16	17	18	19	20	21	22	23	24	25	26	27	28	29	30	31	32	33	34	35	36	37	38	39	40	41	42	43	44	45	46
Ground	H	A	H	A	A	H	A	H	A	H	A	H	A	A	H	H	A	A	H	A	H	H	A	H	A	A	H	A	H	A	H	H	A	H	A	A	H	A	H	H	A	H	A	H	A	H
Result	W	L	L	L	L	D	D	W	L	W	L	W	L	D	L	L	L	D	L	L	D	D	D	D	L	W	L	L	W	W	L	D	D	W	W	W	D	W	W	W	L	W	D	W	D	D
Position	3	16	20	21	22	22	21	19	21	19	19	18	19	18	20	20	20	21	22	22	23	23	23	24	24	22	23	23	22	22	22	22	22	22	22	19	20	17	17	14	16	15	15	13	22	23

Updated to match(es) played on 22 July 2020. Source: Statto.com
A = Away; H = Home; W = Win; D = Draw; L = Loss

==== Matches ====
On Thursday, 20 June 2019, the EFL Championship fixtures were revealed.

3 August 2019 1	Wigan Athletic	3–2	Cardiff City	Wigan
15:00 BST	Windass (penalty missed) 49' 63'; Jacobs 59'; Garner (yellow card) 66'; Evans 75'; Byrne (yellow card) 90+1'	Report	Ralls (yellow card) 7' (goal) 20'; Reid (yellow card) 44'; Murphy (yellow card) 45+1'; Flint (yellow card) 66'; Bogle 70'	Stadium: DW Stadium; Attendance: 12,169; Referee: David Webb

10 August 2019 2	Preston North End	3–0	Wigan Athletic	Preston
15:00 BST	Maguire 6'; Pearson (yellow card) 20'; Moult 39'; Gallagher 54'	Report	Byrne (yellow card) 9'; Macleod (yellow card) 16'	Stadium: Deepdale; Attendance: 14,789; Referee: Jeremy Simpson

17 August 2019 3	Wigan Athletic	0–2	Leeds United	Wigan
15:00 BST	Williams (yellow card) 9' (yellow-red card) 21'; Evans (yellow card) 56'; Fox (yellow card) 73'; Morsy (yellow card) 90+3'	Report	Forshaw (yellow card) 24'; Bamford 34', 65'; White (yellow card) 45+1'	Stadium: DW Stadium; Attendance: 14,819; Referee: Andrew Madley

20 August 2019 4	Middlesbrough	1–0	Wigan Athletic	Middlesbrough
19:45 BST	Browne (yellow card) 21'; Assombalonga 23'; Ayala (yellow card) 45+2'	Report	Byrne (yellow card) 17'; Kipré (yellow card) 72'	Stadium: Riverside Stadium; Attendance: 18,649; Referee: Keith Stroud

24 August 2019 5	Queens Park Rangers	3–1	Wigan Athletic	Shepherd's Bush
15:00 BST	Chair (yellow card) 45+2'; Wells 48'; Eze 61'; Hall (yellow card) 78'; Hugill 81'	Report	Kipré 2', (yellow card) 65'; Dunkley (yellow card) 58'; Robinson (yellow card) 76'; Garner (yellow card) 78'	Stadium: Loftus Road; Attendance: 11,921; Referee: Matt Donohue

31 August 2019 6	Wigan Athletic	0–0	Barnsley	Wigan
15:00 BST	Williams (yellow card) 57'	Report	Halme (yellow card) 10'; Andersen (yellow card) 39'; Wilks (yellow card) 47'; Williams (yellow card) 85' (yellow-red card) 90+1'; Cavaré (yellow card) 90+6'	Stadium: DW Stadium; Attendance: 10,214; Referee: Andy Woolmer

14 September 2019 7	Hull City	2–2	Wigan Athletic	Kingston upon Hull
15:00 BST	Bowen 10'; Grosicki 20' (yellow card) 64'; Elder (yellow card) 90+4'	Report	Dunkley 8' (yellow card) 62'; Byrne (yellow card) 19'; Morsy (yellow card) 23'; Mulgrew (yellow card) 69'; Gelhardt 75'; Garner (yellow card) 83'; Robinson (yellow card) 90+3'	Stadium: KCOM Stadium; Attendance: 10,069; Referee: Gavin Ward

21 September 2019 8	Wigan Athletic	2–0	Charlton Athletic	Wigan
15:00 BST	Dunkley 22', 70'; Morsy (yellow card) 45+1'	Report	Oshilaja (yellow card) 56'	Stadium: DW Stadium; Attendance: 9,567; Referee: Andy Davies

27 September 2019 9	Fulham	2–0	Wigan Athletic	Fulham
19:45 BST	Bryan 47'; Reed (yellow card) 58'; Mitrović (yellow card) 66'; Cairney 83'	Report	Morsy (yellow card) 5'; Dunkley (yellow card) 46'; Williams (yellow card) 66'	Stadium: Craven Cottage; Referee: Dean Whitestone

1 October 2019 10	Wigan Athletic	1–0	Birmingham City	Wigan
19:45 BST	Pilkington 76'	Report		Stadium: DW Stadium; Attendance: 9,244; Referee: Tim Robinson

5 October 2019 11	Sheffield Wednesday	1–0	Wigan Athletic	Owlerton
15:00 BST	Odubajo (yellow card) 40'; Luongo 57'	Report	Morsy (yellow card) 62'	Stadium: Hillsborough; Attendance: 22,753; Referee: Lee Mason

20 October 2019 12	Wigan Athletic	1–0	Nottingham Forest	Wigan
14:00 BST	Lowe 35'; Macleod (yellow card) 41'; Byrne (yellow card) 51'; Jacobs (yellow card) 82'	Report	Ribeiro (yellow card) 90+2'	Stadium: DW Stadium; Attendance: 13,077; Referee: Matt Donohue

23 October 2019 13	Derby County	1–0	Wigan Athletic	Derby
19:45 BST	Shinnie (yellow card) 64' (goal) 90+2'; Malone (yellow card) 65'	Report	Robinson (yellow card) 51'; Macleod (yellow card) 90+3'	Stadium: Pride Park Stadium; Attendance: 24,697; Referee: Keith Stroud

27 October 2019 14	Bristol City	2–2	Wigan Athletic	Ashton Gate
14:00 GMT	Weimann 39'; Baker (yellow card) 63'; Pereira 86'	Report	Robinson (yellow card) 4'; Dunkley 44', 53'; Morsy (yellow card) 68'	Stadium: Ashton Gate Stadium; Attendance: 22,246; Referee: John Brooks

2 November 2019 15	Wigan Athletic	1–2	Swansea City	Wigan
12:30 GMT	Moore 21' (pen.); Morsy (yellow card) 28'; Sterling (yellow card) 34'; Massey (yellow card) 41'; Williams (yellow card) 72'	Report	Dyer 12'; Ayew (yellow card) 21'; Byers (yellow card) 27'; Surridge 90+2'	Stadium: DW Stadium; Attendance: 9,080; Referee: Peter Bankes

9 November 2019 16	Wigan Athletic	0–3	Brentford	Wigan
15:00 GMT	Kipre (yellow card) 56' (yellow-red card) 73'; Williams (yellow card) 90+7'	Report	Mbeumo 5'; Nørgaard (yellow card) 58'; Mokotjo 70'; Dasilva 83'; Jeanvier (red card) 90+7'	Stadium: DW Stadium; Attendance: 9,260; Referee: Andy Davies

23 November 2019 17	Stoke City	2–1	Wigan Athletic	Stoke-on-Trent
15:00 GMT	McClean (yellow card) 41'; Batth 55'; Ward (yellow card) 77'; Diouf 90+3'; Ndiaye (yellow card) 90+7'	Report	Morsy 39' (yellow card) 90+7'; Byrne (yellow card) 54'	Stadium: bet365 Stadium; Attendance: 22,530; Referee: Geoff Eltringham

26 November 2019 18	Millwall	2–2	Wigan Athletic	Bermondsey
19:45 GMT	Hutchinson 24' (yellow card) 63'; Smith 60'; Romeo (yellow card) 79'	Report	Pilkington 3'; Macleod (yellow card) 43'; Robinson 56'	Stadium: The Den; Attendance: 10,021; Referee: Dean Whitestone

30 November 2019 19	Wigan Athletic	1–3	Reading	Wigan
15:00 GMT	Mulgrew (yellow card) 7'; Garner 34' (yellow card) 78'	Report	Morrison (yellow card) 44'; Pușcaș 79' (pen.), 80', 84' (yellow card) 81'	Stadium: DW Stadium; Attendance: 8,965; Referee: Jeremy Simpson

7 December 2019 20	Luton Town	2–1	Wigan Athletic	Luton
15:00 GMT	McManaman 87'; Moncur 90+3' (yellow card) 90+4'	Report	Moore 35'; Dunkley (yellow card) 49' (yellow-red card) 90+1'; Pilkington (yellow card) 54'; Garner (yellow card) 61'	Stadium: Kenilworth Road; Attendance: 10,011; Referee: Andrew Madley

11 December 2019 21	Wigan Athletic	1–1	West Bromwich Albion	Wigan
19:45 GMT	Johnstone 50' (o.g.); Massey (yellow card) 82'	Report	Austin 59'; Sawyers (yellow card) 73'; Bartley (yellow card) 90+3'	Stadium: DW Stadium; Attendance: 9,444; Referee: Andy Davies

14 December 2019 22	Wigan Athletic	1–1	Huddersfield Town	Wigan
15:00 GMT	Windass 43'; Evans (yellow card) 67'	Report	Hadergjonaj (yellow card) 65'; Grant 70'; Chalobah (yellow card) 85'	Stadium: DW Stadium; Attendance: 10,383; Referee: Steve Martin

23 December 2019 23	Blackburn Rovers	0–0	Wigan Athletic	Blackburn
19:45 GMT	Rothwell (yellow card) 90+6'	Report	Morsy (yellow card) 38'; Windass (yellow card) 88'	Stadium: Ewood Park; Attendance: 18,726; Referee: Gavin Ward

26 December 2019 24	Wigan Athletic	1–1	Derby County	Wigan
15:00 GMT	Evans (yellow card) 61'; Garner 81'	Report	Bielik (yellow card) 22'; Bogle (yellow card) 30'; Lawrence (yellow card) 43'; Waghorn 90+3'	Stadium: DW Stadium; Attendance: 14,211; Referee: Jarred Gillett

29 December 2019 25	Nottingham Forest	1–0	Wigan Athletic	West Bridgford
15:00 GMT	Semedo (yellow card) 57'; Figueiredo 60'	Report	Byrne (yellow card) 57'; Kipré (yellow card) 71'; Windass (penalty missed) 79'; Naismith (yellow card) 81'	Stadium: City Ground; Attendance: 27,844; Referee: Matt Donohue

1 January 2020 26	Birmingham City	2–3	Wigan Athletic	Bordesley
15:00 GMT	Mrabti 39'; Maghoma 81'	Report	Windass 9', 50'; Williams (yellow card) 50'; Kipré 73'; Byrne (yellow card) 87'	Stadium: St Andrew's Trillion Trophy Stadium; Attendance: 18,616; Referee: David Webb

11 January 2020 27	Wigan Athletic	0–2	Bristol City	Wigan
15:00 GMT	Robinson (yellow card) 54'	Report	Paterson 77'; Diédhiou 79'; Baker (yellow card) 90+3'	Stadium: DW Stadium; Attendance: 9,074; Referee: Stephen Martin

18 January 2020 28	Swansea City	2–1	Wigan Athletic	Swansea
15:00 GMT	Brewster 19'; Ayew 67'	Report	Byrne 16'; Kipré (yellow card) 89'	Stadium: Liberty Stadium; Attendance: 15,659; Referee: James Linington

28 January 2020 29	Wigan Athletic	2–1	Sheffield Wednesday	Wigan
19:45 GMT	Moore 56'; Lowe 90'	Report	Murphy 32'	Stadium: DW Stadium; Attendance: 9,759; Referee: David Webb

1 February 2020 30	Leeds United	0–1	Wigan Athletic	Leeds
15:00 GMT		Report	Massey (yellow card) 45+2'; Hernández 59' (o.g.); Naismith (yellow card) 90+3'	Stadium: Elland Road; Attendance: 35,162; Referee: Tony Harrington

8 February 2020 31	Wigan Athletic	1–2	Preston North End	Wigan
12:30 GMT	Dunkley 57' (yellow card) 66'	Report	Barkhuizen 7'; Johnson 48'; Rudd (yellow card) 76'; Fisher (yellow card) 84'; Stockley (yellow card) 90+2'	Stadium: DW Stadium; Attendance: 12,439; Referee: Darren England

11 February 2020 32	Wigan Athletic	2–2	Middlesbrough	Wigan
19:45 GMT	Morsy 29'; Dunkley (yellow card) 38' (yellow-red card) 62'; Kipré (yellow card) 54'; Pilkington (yellow card) 64'; Williams (yellow card) 69'; Naismith (yellow card) 70'; Moukoudi 76' (o.g.); Massey (yellow card) 90+1'	Report	Moukoudi (yellow card) 59'; Wing 64', 68'; Saville (yellow card) 72'; Howson (yellow card) 87'	Stadium: DW Stadium; Referee: Oliver Langford

15 February 2020 33	Cardiff City	2–2	Wigan Athletic	Cardiff
15:00 GMT	Murphy 8' (yellow card) 25'; Naismith 55' (o.g.); Morrison (yellow card) 75'; Vaulks (yellow card) 80'	Report	Evans (yellow card) 1'; Moore 5', 45+4' (pen.); Williams (yellow card) 31'; Gelhardt (yellow card) 82'	Stadium: Cardiff City Stadium; Attendance: 21,287; Referee: John Brooks

22 February 2020 34	Wigan Athletic	1–0	Millwall	Wigan
15:00 GMT	Hutchinson 57' (o.g.); Kipré (yellow card) 89'	Report	J. Wallace (yellow card) 2'; Molumby (yellow card) 37'; M. Wallace (yellow card) 43'	Stadium: DW Stadium; Attendance: 9,639; Referee: Jeremy Simpson

26 February 2020 35	Reading	0–3	Wigan Athletic	Reading
20:00 GMT	Yiadom (yellow card) 26'; Pelé (yellow card) 39'; Méïté (yellow card) 78'	Report	Moore 23'; Byrne (yellow card) 62'; Lowe 67'; Jacobs 90+9'	Stadium: Madejski Stadium; Attendance: 10,088; Referee: Geoff Eltringham

29 February 2020 36	West Bromwich Albion	0–1	Wigan Athletic	West Bromwich
15:00 GMT	Townsend (yellow card) 86'; Periera (yellow card) 90+3'	Report	Morsy 73'; Williams (yellow card) 90+1'	Stadium: The Hawthorns; Attendance: 24,942; Referee: Tony Harrington

7 March 2020 37	Wigan Athletic	0–0	Luton Town	Wigan
15:00 GMT	Moore (yellow card) 39'	Report	Rea (yellow card) 35'; Brown (yellow card) 43'	Stadium: DW Stadium; Attendance: 10,292; Referee: Gavin Ward

20 June 2020 38	Huddersfield Town	0–2	Wigan Athletic	Huddersfield
15:00 BST	Smith Rowe (yellow card) 34'; O'Brien (yellow card) 45'	Report	Lowe 26'; Pilkington 48'; Morsy (yellow card) 82'	Stadium: John Smith's Stadium; Attendance: 0 Referee: Jarred Gillett
Note: Season was suspended until 3 April 2020, due to the COVID-19 pandemic. The match was rescheduled to 20 June.

27 June 2020 39	Wigan Athletic	2–0	Blackburn Rovers	Wigan
15:00 BST	Evans 80'; Kipré (yellow card) 90'; Jacobs 90+4'	Report		Stadium: DW Stadium; Attendance: 0 Referee: Darren England
Note: Season was suspended until 3 April 2020, due to the COVID-19 pandemic. The match was rescheduled to 27 June.

30 June 2020 40	Wigan Athletic	3–0	Stoke City	Wigan
19:45 BST	Williams (yellow card) 35'; Butland 40' (o.g.); Naismith 65', 68'	Report	Thompson (yellow card) 3'; Ward (yellow card) 50'; Collins (yellow card) 51'	Stadium: DW Stadium; Attendance: 0 Referee: Jeremy Simpson
Note: Season was suspended until 3 April 2020, due to the COVID-19 pandemic. The match was rescheduled to 30 June.

4 July 2020 41	Brentford	3–0	Wigan Athletic	Brentford
15:00 BST	Benrahma 19', 57', 66'	Report	Robinson (yellow card) 59'; Garner (red card) 81'	Stadium: Griffin Park; Attendance: 0 Referee: Matt Donohue
Note: On 3 April, the English Football League decided to postpone all football until safe to do so due to the COVID-19 pandemic. The match was rescheduled to 4 July.

8 July 2020 42	Wigan Athletic	1–0	Queens Park Rangers	Wigan
18:00 BST	Moore 33'; Williams (yellow card) 63'	Report		Stadium: DW Stadium; Attendance: 0 Referee: Geoff Eltringham
Note: On 3 April, the English Football League decided to postpone all football until safe to do so due to the COVID-19 pandemic. The match was rescheduled to 8 July.

11 July 2020 43	Barnsley	0–0	Wigan Athletic	Barnsley
15:00 BST	Mowatt (yellow card) 56'; Simões (yellow card) 64'	Report	Robinson (yellow card) 38'; Fox (red card) 71'; Gelhardt (yellow card) 77'; Williams (yellow card) 90+2'	Stadium: Oakwell; Attendance: 0 Referee: David Webb
Note: On 3 April, the English Football League decided to postpone all football until safe to do so due to the COVID-19 pandemic. The match was rescheduled to 11 July.

14 July 2020 44	Wigan Athletic	8–0	Hull City	Wigan
19:45 BST	Naismith 1'; Moore 27', 40'; Dowell 32', 42', 65'; Lowe 37'; Williams 45+1'	Report	Honeyman (yellow card) 33'; Toral (yellow card) 45'	Stadium: DW Stadium; Attendance: 0 Referee: Tony Harrington
Note: On 3 April, the English Football League decided to postpone all football until safe to do so due to the COVID-19 pandemic. The match was rescheduled to 14 July.

18 July 2020 45	Charlton Athletic	2–2	Wigan Athletic	Charlton
12:30 BST	Doughty 11'; Bonne 90+2'; Morgan (yellow card) 90+4'	Report	Lowe 9'; Dowell 40'; Williams (yellow card) 43'; Kipré (yellow card) 63'; Morsy (yellow card) 73'	Stadium: The Valley; Attendance: 0 Referee: Gavin Ward
Note: On 3 April, the English Football League decided to postpone all football until safe to do so due to the COVID-19 pandemic. The match was rescheduled to 18 July.

22 July 2020 46	Wigan Athletic	1–1	Fulham	Wigan
19:30 BST	Morsy (yellow card) 17'; Moore 32'; Robinson (yellow card) 44'; Williams (yellow card) 48'	Report	Odoi (yellow card) 22'; Onomah (yellow card) 34'; Kebano 49', (yellow card) 74'; Hector (yellow card) 86'	Stadium: DW Stadium; Attendance: 0 Referee: John Brooks
Note: On 3 April, the English Football League decided to postpone all football until safe to do so due to the COVID-19 pandemic. The match was rescheduled to 22 July.

=== FA Cup ===
The third round draw was made live on BBC Two from Etihad Stadium, Micah Richards and Tony Adams conducted the draw.

4 January 2020 Third round	Leicester City	2–0	Wigan Athletic	Leicester
15:00 GMT	Pearce 19' (o.g.); Barnes 40'	Report	Morsy (yellow card) 90+3'	Stadium: King Power Stadium; Attendance: 30,330; Referee: Simon Hooper

=== EFL Cup ===
The first round draw was made on 20 June.

13 August 2019 First round	Wigan Athletic	0–1	Stoke City	Wigan
19:45 BST	Mulgrew (yellow card) 24'	Report	Collins 10', (yellow card) 64'; Woods (yellow card) 63'; Clucas (yellow card) 65'	Stadium: DW Stadium; Attendance: 3,821; Referee: Dean Whitestone

== Statistics ==
=== Appearances & Goals ===
As of 22 July 2020

No.	Pos	Nat	Player	Total		Championship		FA Cup		League Cup	
No.	Pos	Nat	Player	Apps	Goals	Apps	Goals	Apps	Goals	Apps	Goals
1	GK	(Scotland) SCO	David Marshall	40	0	39+0	0	1+0	0	0+0	0
2	DF	(England) ENG	Nathan Byrne	39	1	39+0	1	0+0	0	0+0	0
3	DF	(United States) USA	Antonee Robinson	39	1	38+0	1	0+1	0	0+0	0
4	MF	(Scotland) SCO	Lewis MacLeod	12	0	11+1	0	0+0	0	0+0	0
5	MF	(Egypt) EGY	Sam Morsy	44	3	43+0	3	1+0	0	0+0	0
6	DF	(Scotland) SCO	Danny Fox	11	0	9+2	0	0+0	0	0+0	0
7	MF	(Republic of Ireland) IRL	Anthony Pilkington	16	3	9+7	3	0+0	0	0+0	0
8	MF	(Wales) WAL	Lee Evans	33	2	18+14	2	1+0	0	0+0	0
9	FW	(England) ENG	Jamal Lowe	48	6	40+6	6	0+1	0	1+0	0
11	FW	(England) ENG	Gavin Massey	33	0	21+10	0	1+0	0	1+0	0
12	DF	(England) ENG	Tom Pearce	8	0	4+3	0	1+0	0	0+0	0
14	FW	(England) ENG	Joe Garner	28	2	9+19	2	0+0	0	0+0	0
15	DF	(England) ENG	Dujon Sterling	10	0	7+1	0	1+0	0	1+0	0
17	MF	(England) ENG	Michael Jacobs	32	3	19+13	3	0+0	0	0+0	0
18	MF	(England) ENG	Gary Roberts	10	0	3+6	0	0+0	0	1+0	0
19	FW	(Wales) WAL	Kieffer Moore	36	10	32+4	10	0+0	0	0+0	0
20	MF	(England) ENG	Joe Williams	40	1	34+4	1	1+0	0	1+0	0
21	DF	(Ivory Coast) CIV	Cédric Kipré	37	2	32+4	2	1+0	0	0+0	0
22	DF	(England) ENG	Chey Dunkley	28	6	22+4	6	1+0	0	1+0	0
23	GK	(England) ENG	Jamie Jones	8	0	7+0	0	0+0	0	1+0	0
25	MF	(Romania) ROU	Alex Dobre	1	0	0+1	0	0+0	0	0+0	0
30	MF	(England) ENG	Kieran Dowell	13	5	12+0	5	1+0	0	0+0	0
31	MF	(England) ENG	Chris Merrie	1	0	0+0	0	0+0	0	0+1	0
32	FW	(England) ENG	Charlie Jolley	1	0	0+0	0	0+0	0	0+1	0
33	MF	(Scotland) SCO	Kal Naismith	38	3	22+15	3	0+0	0	1+0	0
37	DF	(Nigeria) NGR	Leon Balogun	11	0	10+1	0	0+0	0	0+0	0
38	FW	(England) ENG	Joe Gelhardt	20	1	3+16	1	0+1	0	0+0	0
39	MF	(England) ENG	Jensen Weir	1	0	0+0	0	0+0	0	0+1	0
Players out on loan:
10	MF	(England) ENG	Josh Windass	16	4	12+3	4	1+0	0	0+0	0
24	FW	(England) ENG	Callum Lang	2	0	0+1	0	0+0	0	1+0	0
Players who have left the club:
16	DF	(Scotland) SCO	Charlie Mulgrew	13	0	12+0	0	0+0	0	1+0	0
25	FW	(Nigeria) NGR	Bright Enobakhare	3	0	0+2	0	0+0	0	1+0	0

=== Goals record ===
As of 22 July 2020

Rank	No.	Nat.	Po.	Name	Championship	FA Cup	League Cup	Total
1	19	(Wales)	CF	Kieffer Moore	10	0	0	10
2	22	(England)	DF	Chey Dunkley	6	0	0	6
2	9	(England)	RW	Jamal Lowe	6	0	0	6
4	30	(England)	AM	Kieran Dowell	5	0	0	5
5	10	(England)	AM	Josh Windass	4	0	0	4
6	5	(Egypt)	CM	Sam Morsy	3	0	0	3
6	7	(Republic of Ireland)	LW	Anthony Pilkington	3	0	0	3
6	17	(England)	LM	Michael Jacobs	3	0	0	3
6	33	(Scotland)	LM	Kal Naismith	3	0	0	3
10	8	(Wales)	CM	Lee Evans	2	0	0	2
10	14	(England)	CF	Joe Garner	2	0	0	2
10	21	(Ivory Coast)	DF	Cédric Kipré	2	0	0	2
13	2	(England)	RB	Nathan Byrne	1	0	0	1
13	3	(United States)	LB	Antonee Robinson	1	0	0	1
13	20	(England)	MF	Joe Williams	1	0	0	1
13	38	(England)	CF	Joe Gelhardt	1	0	0	1
–				Own goals	4	0	0	4
Total					57	0	0	57

=== Disciplinary record ===
As of 22 July 2020

Rank	No.	Nat.	Po.	Name	Championship			FA Cup			League Cup			Total		
Rank	No.	Nat.	Po.	Name	Yellow card	(yellow card) (yellow-red card)	Red card	Yellow card	(yellow card) (yellow-red card)	Red card	Yellow card	(yellow card) (yellow-red card)	Red card	Yellow card	(yellow card) (yellow-red card)	Red card
1	20	(England)	DM	Joe Williams	13	1	0	0	0	0	0	0	0	13	1	0
2	5	(Egypt)	CM	Sam Morsy	12	0	0	1	0	0	0	0	0	13	0	0
3	21	(Ivory Coast)	CB	Cédric Kipré	8	1	0	0	0	0	0	0	0	8	1	0
4	2	(England)	RB	Nathan Byrne	9	0	0	0	0	0	0	0	0	9	0	0
5	3	(United States)	LB	Antonee Robinson	8	0	0	0	0	0	0	0	0	8	0	0
5	22	(England)	CB	Chey Dunkley	4	2	0	0	0	0	0	0	0	4	2	0
7	14	(England)	CF	Joe Garner	5	0	1	0	0	0	0	0	0	5	0	1
8	4	(Scotland)	CM	Lewis Macleod	4	0	0	0	0	0	0	0	0	4	0	0
8	8	(Wales)	CM	Lee Evans	4	0	0	0	0	0	0	0	0	4	0	0
10	11	(England)	LW	Gavin Massey	3	0	0	0	0	0	0	0	0	3	0	0
10	16	(Scotland)	CB	Charlie Mulgrew	2	0	0	0	0	0	1	0	0	3	0	0
10	33	(Scotland)	LM	Kal Naismith	3	0	0	0	0	0	0	0	0	3	0	0
13	6	(Scotland)	CB	Danny Fox	1	0	1	0	0	0	0	0	0	1	0	1
13	7	(Republic of Ireland)	LW	Anthony Pilkington	2	0	0	0	0	0	0	0	0	2	0	0
13	38	(England)	CF	Joe Gelhardt	2	0	0	0	0	0	0	0	0	2	0	0
16	10	(England)	AM	Josh Windass	1	0	0	0	0	0	0	0	0	1	0	0
16	11	(England)	LW	Gavin Massey	1	0	0	0	0	0	0	0	0	1	0	0
16	15	(England)	RB	Dujon Sterling	1	0	0	0	0	0	0	0	0	1	0	0
16	17	(England)	LM	Michael Jacobs	1	0	0	0	0	0	0	0	0	1	0	0
16	19	(Wales)	CF	Kieffer Moore	1	0	0	0	0	0	0	0	0	1	0	0
Total					68	4	2	1	0	0	1	0	0	70	4	2
