= Joe Dodoo =

Ghanaian footballer

Personal information
- Full name: Joseph Dodoo
- Date of birth: 29 June 1995 (age 31)
- Place of birth: Kumasi, Ghana
- Height: 1.83 m (6 ft 0 in)
- Position: Forward

Team information
- Current team: Alfreton Town

Youth career
- 2008–2013: Leicester City

Senior career*
| Years | Team | Apps | (Gls) |
| 2013–2016 | Leicester City | 1 | (0) |
| 2015 | → Bury (loan) | 4 | (1) |
| 2016–2019 | Rangers | 20 | (3) |
| 2017 | → Charlton Athletic (loan) | 5 | (1) |
| 2018–2019 | → Blackpool (loan) | 18 | (2) |
| 2019–2020 | Bolton Wanderers | 24 | (4) |
| 2020–2021 | Ankara Keçiörengücü | 14 | (1) |
| 2021 | Wigan Athletic | 20 | (4) |
| 2021–2022 | Doncaster Rovers | 33 | (4) |
| 2022–2023 | Burton Albion | 7 | (0) |
| 2025 | Solihull Moors | 7 | (1) |
| 2025– | Alfreton Town | 1 | (0) |

International career
| 2013 | England U18 | 1 | (0) |
- * Club domestic league appearances and goals as of 15:16, 18 August 2025 (UTC)

Joseph Dodoo (born 29 June 1995) is a Ghanaian professional footballer who plays as a forward for Northern Premier League Premier Division club Alfreton Town.

He came through the youth academy at Leicester City, and made his debut for them in August 2015, scoring a hat-trick and providing an assist in a 4–1 win at Bury. Later that year, he had a one-month loan at Bury. In July 2016, he signed a four-year deal at Rangers. Dodoo made a limited number of appearances for the Rangers' first team, and was loaned to Charlton Athletic and Blackpool.

Born in Ghana and living in England from the age of eight, Dodoo is eligible to represent either Ghana or England at the international level. He has played once for England at under-18 level in 2013.

== Club career ==
=== Leicester City ===
Dodoo made his first team debut on 25 August 2015, in the second round of the League Cup away to Bury at Gigg Lane. He played the full 90 minutes and scored a hat-trick in a 4–1 victory, also assisting the goal by Andrej Kramarić. Bury subsequently stated that they were interested in signing him on loan. Four days later, Dodoo made his first Premier League appearance, as a 72nd-minute substitute for Marc Albrighton in a 1–1 draw with Bournemouth at Dean Court. In the next round of the League Cup on 22 September, his first game at the King Power Stadium, Dodoo scored the opening goal after six minutes in a 2–1 extra-time win over West Ham United.

==== Bury (loan) ====
On 19 November 2015, Dodoo joined Bury of League One on loan until 18 December. He made his debut two days later, starting in a home game against Burton Albion and contributing to the only goal of the game in the 40th minute when his low cross was put into the Burton net by their defender Jerome Binnom-Williams. Many sources have recorded this as a Dodoo goal, however, officially it was recorded as a Binnom-Williams own goal.

=== Rangers ===
Dodoo opened signing talks with Scottish Premiership side Rangers in July 2016 with manager Mark Warburton. On 19 July, he signed a four-year deal with the Glasgow-based club, for a £250,000 development fee.

He made his debut three days later in their Scottish League Cup match away to East Stirlingshire, replacing Michael O'Halloran after 60 minutes and scoring the last goal of a 3–0 win from close range when set up by Lee Wallace. He scored his first league goals on 26 November 2016, against Partick Thistle, netting two late strikes in a 2–1 win for Rangers.

Dodoo joined Charlton Athletic on loan on 31 August 2017. On his debut for the club he came on as a substitute and scored the winning goal in a 4–3 victory at Oldham Athletic.

Dodoo was loaned to Blackpool in June 2018 on a one-year deal. He left Rangers on 2 September 2019 by mutual consent.

=== Bolton Wanderers ===
On 3 October 2019, Dodoo signed a contract with League One side Bolton Wanderers until the end of the season, subject to international clearance. He made his debut four days later, coming on as a second-half substitute for Dennis Politic in the goalless draw at home to Blackpool. He scored his first goal for the club on 7 December in the 2–2 home draw with AFC Wimbledon. On 26 June it was announced Dodoo would be one of 14 senior players released at the end of his contract on 30 June.

=== Later career ===
On 12 September 2020, Dodoo signed for TFF 1. Lig side Ankara Keçiörengücü on a two-year contract, making his debut for the club on 20 September 2020. He was released by mutual consent on 5 January 2021.

On 9 February 2021, Dodoo joined League One side Wigan Athletic on a deal until the end of the 2020–21 season. He scored his first goal for Wigan in a 3–0 win against Milton Keynes Dons on 6 March.

On 6 September 2021, Dodoo joined League One side Doncaster Rovers on a two-year deal. Dodoo made his debut for the club a day later in a 6–0 defeat against Rotherham United in the EFL Trophy. On 12 November 2022, Dodoo signed for League One side Burton Albion on a short-term deal.

On 27 March 2025, Dodoo joined National League side Solihull Moors on a short-term deal until the end of the season. He departed the club at the end of his deal. On 16 August 2025, Dodoo joined National League North club Alfreton Town.

== International career ==
Dodoo is eligible to represent England or Ghana internationally. In March 2013, Dodoo was called up to the England under-18 team and played in a match against Belgium. On 20 May 2016 he was called up to the Ghana squad for their Africa Cup of Nations qualifier against Mauritius; as he required FIFA to approve his change of association, he was unable to play, but trained with the squad.

== Career statistics ==
As of end of 2024–25 season

Appearances and goals by club, season and competition
| Club | Season | League | | | FA Cup | | League Cup | | Other | | Total | |
| Club | Season | Division | Apps | Goals | Apps | Goals | Apps | Goals | Apps | Goals | Apps | Goals |
|---|---|---|---|---|---|---|---|---|---|---|---|---|
| Leicester City | 2015–16 | Premier League | 1 | 0 | 0 | 0 | 3 | 4 | – | | 4 | 4 |
| Bury (loan) | 2015–16 | League One | 4 | 1 | 1 | 0 | 0 | 0 | 0 | 0 | 5 | 1 |
| Rangers | 2016–17 | Scottish Premiership | 20 | 3 | 1 | 0 | 4 | 2 | – | | 25 | 5 |
| Rangers | 2017–18 | Scottish Premiership | 0 | 0 | 2 | 0 | 0 | 0 | 0 | 0 | 2 | 0 |
| Rangers | Rangers Total | | 20 | 3 | 3 | 0 | 4 | 2 | 0 | 0 | 27 | 5 |
| Charlton Athletic (loan) | 2017–18 | League One | 5 | 1 | 1 | 0 | 0 | 0 | 2 (Note: Appearance(s) in the EFL Trophy.) | 1 | 8 | 2 |
| Blackpool (loan) | 2018–19 | League One | 18 | 2 | 3 | 2 | 2 | 0 | 2 | 2 | 25 | 6 |
| Bolton Wanderers | 2019–20 | League One | 24 | 4 | 1 | 0 | 0 | 0 | 2 | 0 | 27 | 4 |
| Ankara Keçiörengücü | 2020–21 | TFF First League | 14 | 1 | 2 | 1 | – | | – | | 16 | 2 |
| Wigan Athletic | 2020–21 | League One | 20 | 4 | 0 | 0 | 0 | 0 | 0 | 0 | 20 | 4 |
| Doncaster Rovers | 2021–22 | League One | 33 | 4 | 2 | 0 | 0 | 0 | 4 | 4 | 39 | 8 |
| Burton Albion | 2022–23 | League One | 9 | 0 | 1 | 0 | 0 | 0 | 1 | 4 | 11 | 0 |
| Solihull Moors | 2024–25 | National League | 7 | 1 | 0 | 0 | — | | 0 | 0 | 7 | 1 |
| Career total | | | 155 | 21 | 14 | 3 | 9 | 6 | 11 | 7 | 189 | 37 |
