= Chris Merrie =

English footballer

Christopher Merrie
Personal information
- Full name: Christopher Francis Merrie
- Date of birth: 2 November 1998 (age 28)
- Place of birth: Liverpool, England
- Height: 1.80 m (5 ft 11 in)
- Position: Midfielder

Team information
- Current team: AFC Fylde
- Number: 6

Youth career
- –2013: Everton
- 2013–2017: Wigan Athletic

Senior career*
Years	Team	Apps	(Gls)
2017–2021	Wigan Athletic	26	(0)
2017	→ Southport (loan)	5	(1)
2018	→ Altrincham (loan)	7	(1)
2021–2025	Tranmere Rovers	90	(0)
2025–	AFC Fylde	0	(0)
- * Club domestic league appearances and goals as of 14:55, 23 July 2025 (UTC)

Christopher Francis Merrie (born 2 November 1998) is an English professional footballer who plays as a midfielder for National League club AFC Fylde.

== Club career ==
=== Wigan Athletic ===
Merrie joined Wigan Athletic in 2013, after progressing through the Everton youth ranks. On 8 August 2017, Merrie made his Wigan debut during their EFL Cup tie against Blackpool, which resulted in a 2–1 victory for the Latics. On 31 August 2017, Merrie joined National League North side Southport on a season-long loan deal. However, after featuring just five times, scoring once, Wigan recalled him in November 2017.

In March 2018, he joined Altrincham on loan until the end of the season. He helped the club win promotion from the Northern Premier League, scoring one goal in eight games.

=== Tranmere Rovers ===
In June 2021, Merrie turned down a new contract with Wigan and joined Tranmere Rovers on a two-year deal. In May 2023, he signed a new one-year contract with the club.

On 6 May 2025, the club announced the player would be released in June when his contract expired.

=== AFC Fylde ===
On 23 July 2025, Merrie joined National League North side AFC Fylde.

== Career statistics ==
As of end of 2024–25 season

Appearances and goals by club, season and competition
Club	Season	League			FA Cup		EFL Cup		Other		Total	
Club	Season	Division	Apps	Goals	Apps	Goals	Apps	Goals	Apps	Goals	Apps	Goals
Wigan Athletic	2017–18	League One	0	0	0	0	1	0	2 (Note: Appearances in EFL Trophy)	0	3	0
Wigan Athletic	2018–19	Championship	0	0	0	0	0	0	0	0	0	0
Wigan Athletic	2019–20	Championship	0	0	0	0	1	0	0	0	1	0
Wigan Athletic	2020–21	League One	26	0	1	0	1	0	3	0	30	0
Wigan Athletic	Total		26	0	1	0	3	0	5	0	35	0
Southport (loan)	2017–18	National League North	5	1	0	0	—		0	0	5	1
Altrincham (loan)	2017–18	Northern Premier League Premier Division	7	1	0	0	—		1 (Note: Appearance in Cheshire Senior Cup)	0	8	1
Tranmere Rovers	2021–22	League Two	15	0	0	0	0	0	3	0	18	0
Tranmere Rovers	2022–23	League Two	31	0	1	0	1	0	4	0	37	0
Tranmere Rovers	2023–24	League Two	12	0	1	0	1	0	1	0	15	0
Tranmere Rovers	2024–25	League Two	32	0	0	0	2	0	3	0	37	0
Tranmere Rovers	Total		90	0	2	0	4	0	11	0	107	0
Career total			128	2	3	0	7	0	17	0	155	2
