= 2026–27 Wigan Athletic F.C. season =

95th season in existence of Wigan Athletic FC

Wigan Athletic
2026–27 season
- Owner: Mike Danson
- Chairman: Ben Goodburn
- Manager: Gary Caldwell
- Stadium: Brick Community Stadium
- EFL Cup: First round
- Highest home attendance: 10,412
- Lowest home attendance: 7,415
- Average home league attendance: 4,268
- Biggest win: Boreham Wood 0–3 Wigan (7 November)
- Biggest defeat: Wigan 0–4 Stockport (5 September)

The 2026–27 season is the 95th season in the history of Wigan Athletic Football Club, and their fourth consecutive season in League One. In addition to the domestic league, the club will also participate in the FA Cup, the EFL Cup, and the EFL Trophy.

== Transfers and contracts ==
=== In ===
Date	Pos.	Player	From	Fee	Ref.
15 June 2026 (Note: The transfer was announced on 10 June, and would become official on June 15 once the transfer window opened.)	RB	(England) Connor Barrett	(England) Walsall	Undisclosed	
15 June 2026 (Note: The transfer was announced on 6 June, and would become official on June 15 once the transfer window opened.)	CM	(England) Max Power	(England) Bradford City	Undisclosed	
26 June 2026	RW	(England) Sonny Perkins	(England) Leyton Orient	Undisclosed	
1 July 2026	CB	(Scotland) Jeremiah Chilokoa-Mullen	(Scotland) Dunfermline Athletic	Undisclosed	
3 July 2026	LW	(England) Akeel Higgins	(England) West Bromwich Albion	Free	
13 July 2026	GK	(England) Ewan Dodgson	(England) Ashton Athletic	Free	
21 July 2026	CM	(England) Ryan Trevitt	(England) Brentford	Free	
6 August 2026	LB	(Wales) Archie Harris	(England) Bournemouth	Free	
14 August 2026	CB	(England) Finley Burns	(England) Manchester City	£200,000	
1 September 2026	GK	(England) Joe Whitworth	(England) Crystal Palace	Free transfer	
12 September 2026	CF	(Republic of Ireland) Scott Hogan	(England) Milton Keynes Dons	Free	

=== Loaned in ===
Date	Pos.	Player	From	Loaned until	Ref.
4 July 2026	AM	(Sierra Leone) Hindolo Mustapha	(England) Crystal Palace	11 August 2026 (Note: On 11 August, Mustapha's season-long loan from Crystal Palace was terminated by mutual consent.)	
9 July 2026	GK	(England) Joe Walsh	(England) Queens Park Rangers	End of Season	
19 August 2026	AM	(England) Reggie Walsh	(England) Chelsea	End of Season	
20 August 2026	CM	(England) Charlie Gray	(England) Manchester City	End of Season	
21 August 2026	AM	(Wales) Luke Harris	(England) Fulham	End of Season	
1 September 2026	RW	(England) Bradley Burrowes	(England) Aston Villa	End of Season	

=== Loaned out ===
Date	Pos.	Player	To	Loaned until	Ref.
3 August 2026	RW	(England) Joseph Hungbo	(England) Swindon Town	End of Season	
4 August 2026	CM	(England) Kai Payne	(England) Oldham Athletic	End of Season	
14 August 2026	CF	(England) Charlie Hughes	(England) Matlock Town	End of Season	
1 September 2026	RW	(England) Maleace Asamoah	(England) Port Vale	End of Season	
5 September 2026	CF	(England) Adam Moseley	(England) Southport	3 October 2026	
15 October 2026	CF	(England) Cole Simms	(England) Marine	8 November 2026	
13 November 2026	CM	(England) Harrison Rimmer	(England) Marine	13 December 2026	
13 November 2026	CF	(England) Cole Simms	(England) FC United of Manchester	13 December 2026	
14 November 2026	CAM	(England) Chris Sze	(England) FC Halifax Town	14 December 2026	

=== Out ===
Date	Pos.	Player	To	Fee	Ref.
25 June 2026	GK	(England) Sam Tickle	(England) Bristol City	Undisclosed	
4 August 2026	RW	(England) Jonny Smith	(England) Rochdale	Undisclosed	
14 August 2026	CM	(Republic of Ireland) Baba Adeeko	(England) Rochdale	Undisclosed	
18 August 2026	CM	(England) Tobias Brenan	(England) Bromley	Undisclosed	

=== Released / Out of Contract ===
Date	Pos.	Player	Subsequent club	Joined date	Ref.
30 June 2026	CB	(England) Will Aimson	(England) Salford City	1 July 2026	
30 June 2026	AM	(England) Leo Graham	(England) Bury	1 July 2026	
30 June 2026	RB	(Wales) Alex Hughes	(Wales) Connah's Quay Nomads	1 July 2026	
30 June 2026	CB	(Scotland) Jason Kerr	(Scotland) Hibernian	1 July 2026	
30 June 2026	GK	(England) Toby Savin	(England) Torquay United	1 July 2026	
30 June 2026	RB	(England) Steven Sessegnon	(England) AFC Wimbledon	1 July 2026	
30 June 2026	LB	(Scotland) Luke Robinson	(Scotland) Dunfermline Athletic	6 July 2026	
30 June 2026	RB	(England) Jack Hunt	(England) York City	17 July 2026	
30 June 2026	RW	(England) Christy Edwards	(England) Southport	18 July 2026	
30 June 2026	AM	(England) Harrison Bettoni	(England) Chelsea	23 July 2026	
30 June 2026	GK	(England) Jake Spaven	(England) Rochdale	28 July 2026	
30 June 2026	RB	(England) Callum Jones	(England) Mossley	7 August 2026	
30 June 2026	CB	(England) Jack Rogers	(England) Prescot Cables	7 August 2026	
30 June 2026	CM	(Australia) Tyrese Francois	(Australia) Brisbane Roar	28 August 2026	
30 June 2026	CM	(England) Matt Smith	(England) Stevenage	7 September 2026	
30 June 2026	GK	(England) Matthew Corran			
7 September 2026	AM	(England) Ronan Darcy	(England) Accrington Stanley	7 November 2026	

=== New Contract ===
Date	Pos.	Player	Contract until	Ref.
23 June 2026	RB	(England) Llyton Chapman	30 June 2029	
24 June 2026	CM	(England) Jensen Weir	30 June 2028	
24 June 2026	CF	(England) Adam Moseley	30 June 2027	
10 July 2026	AM	(England) Chris Sze	30 June 2027 (Note: Option of a further year)	
13 July 2026	CM	(England) John-Paul Cavanagh	Undisclosed (Note: First professional contract)	
13 July 2026	CB	(England) Zac Edwards	Undisclosed	
13 July 2026	CM	(England) Joe Gilbertson	Undisclosed	
13 July 2026	LB	(England) Mason Goulding	Undisclosed	
13 July 2026	CB	(England) Seb Spelman	Undisclosed	
13 July 2026	GK	(England) Rohan Taylor	Undisclosed	
22 July 2026	RW	(England) Callum McManaman	Undisclosed (Note: Player/mentor role)	

== Pre-season and friendlies ==
On 12 June, Wigan Athletic announced their first three pre-season fixtures to be against Port Vale, Southport and Grimsby Town. On 29 June, a final pre-season fixture was announced to be against AFC Fylde, confirming the club's full pre-season schedule.

Win Draw Loss Fixtures

18 July 2026 Friendly	Wigan Athletic	1–3	Port Vale	Wigan
13:00 BST	Rimmer 72'	Report	Walters 14', 42'; Trialist C 53'	Stadium: Brick Community Stadium

21 July 2025 Friendly	Bury	4–0	Wigan Athletic U21	Bury
19:45 BST	Pedro 32'; Trialist H 64', 85'; Trialist C 89'	Report		Stadium: Gigg Lane; Attendance: 1,062

25 July 2026 Friendly	West Bromwich Albion U21	1–2	Wigan Athletic U21	Walsall
13:00 BST			Simms,	Stadium: WBA Training Ground

25 July 2026 Friendly	AFC Fylde	0–3	Wigan Athletic	Medlar-with-Wesham
15:00 BST	Allen-Hadley (penalty missed) 33	Report	Sze 10' (pen.), 42' (pen.); Murray 54'	Stadium: Mill Farm

28 July 2026 Friendly	Witton Albion	3–1	Wigan Athletic U21	Wincham
19:45 BST	Garbutt, Hooper		Simms (pen.)	Stadium: Wincham Park

31 July 2026 Friendly	Southport	0–0	Wigan Athletic	Southport
19:45 BST		Report		Stadium: Haig Avenue; Attendance: 1,571

1 August 2026 Friendly	Grimsby Town	2–0	Wigan Athletic	Cleethorpes
15:00 BST	Sweeney 10'; Cook 90'	Report		Stadium: Blundell Park; Attendance: 2,043 (200 Wigan fans)

4 August 2026 Friendly	Wolverhampton Wanderers Academy	1–1	Wigan Athletic U21	Wolverhampton
				Stadium: Compton Park

== Competitions ==
=== Overall record ===
Competition	First match	Last match	Starting round	Final position	Record							
Competition	First match	Last match	Starting round	Final position	Pld	W	D	L	GF	GA	GD	Win %
League One	15 August 2026	May 2027	Matchday 1	TBD	16	5	2	9	15	24	−9	31.25
FA Cup	7 November 2026	TBD	First round	TBD	1	1	0	0	3	0	+3	100.00
EFL Cup	8 August 2026	8 August 2026	First round	First round	1	0	1	0	1	1	+0	0.00
EFL Trophy	18 August 2026	TBD	Group Stage	TBD	3	3	0	0	8	5	+3	100.00
Total					21	9	3	9	27	30	−3	42.86

Last updated: 21 November 2026

== EFL Cup ==
Wigan were drawn away to Barnsley in the first round,

Win Draw Loss Fixtures

8 August 2026 First round	Barnsley	1–1 (a.e.t.) (6–5 p)	Wigan Athletic	Barnsley
19:45 BST	McGeehan 81'; Ravenhill (yellow card) 94'	Report	Costelloe 40'	Stadium: Oakwell; Attendance: 4,414; Referee: Richard Eley
	Penalties
	McGeehan (penalty scored); Kelly (penalty scored); Sam Gale (penalty scored); Connell (penalty scored); Cleary (penalty scored); Earl (penalty scored)		Power (penalty scored); Carragher (penalty scored); Higgins (penalty scored); Weir (penalty scored); Murray (penalty scored); Mellish (penalty missed)

== EFL Trophy ==
Wigan were drawn against Blackpool, Crewe Alexandra and Aston Villa F.C. Under-21s and Academy in the group stage.

Pos	Div	Team	Pld	W	PW	PL	L	GF	GA	GD	Pts	Qualification
1	L1	Wigan Athletic	3	3	0	0	0	8	5	+3	9	Advance to Round 2
2	L1	Blackpool	3	1	1	0	1	7	7	0	5	Advance to Round 2
3	L2	Crewe Alexandra	3	1	0	1	1	7	5	+2	4	
4	ACA	Aston Villa U21	3	0	0	0	3	5	10	−5	0	

Source: EFL

Win Draw Loss Fixtures

18 August 2026 North Group B	Wigan Athletic	3–2	Aston Villa F.C. Under-21s and Academy	Wigan
19:00 BST	Miller 27'; Feeney 40' (o.g.); Mullen (yellow card) 66'; Costelloe 81'	Report	Broggio (yellow card) 22'; O'Reilly 75'; Taylor 78'	Stadium: Brick Community Stadium; Attendance: 2,001; Referee: Scott Jackson

22 September 2026 North Group B	Wigan Athletic	3–2	Blackpool	Wigan
19:00 BST	Barrett 2'; Hogan 57'; Murray 78', (yellow card) 90+4'; Mellish (yellow card) 89'	Report	Lyons (yellow card) 39'; Bloxham 72' (pen.); Yates 90'	Stadium: Brick Community Stadium; Attendance: 1,496; Referee: Gareth Rhodes

10 November 2026 North Group B	Crewe Alexandra	1–2	Wigan Athletic	Cheshire
19:00 GMT	Graves (yellow card) 12', (goal) 50'; Nsenga (yellow card) 44'		Higgins (yellow card) 28'; Chilokoa-Mullen 60'; Rimmer 83'	Stadium: Mornflake Stadium; Attendance: 1,150; Referee: Declan Brown

=== Knockout stages ===
w/c 7 December 2026 Round of 32	Wigan Athletic	v	TBC	Wigan
GMT				Stadium: Brick Community Stadium

== FA Cup ==
Wigan were drawn away to Boreham Wood in the first roundand at home to Barnsley in the second round

Win Draw Loss Fixtures

7 November 2026 First round	Boreham Wood	0–3	Wigan Athletic	Boreham Wood, Hertfordshire
15:00 GMT			Mellish 11'; Fox 36', 74'	Stadium: Meadow Park; Attendance: 2,301; Referee: Oliver Mackey

5 December 2026 Second round	Wigan Athletic	v	Barnsley	Wigan
15:00 GMT				Stadium: Brick Community Stadium

== League table ==
Pos	Team	Pld	W	D	L	GF	GA	GD	Pts
15	Wycombe Wanderers	14	4	6	4	24	27	−3	18
16	Burton Albion	16	4	5	7	21	29	−8	17
17	Wigan Athletic	16	5	2	9	15	24	−9	17
18	AFC Wimbledon	15	4	4	7	11	25	−14	16
19	Notts County	13	3	5	5	13	15	−2	14

Updated to match(es) played on 21 November 2026. Source: EFL Official Website
Rules for classification: 1) Points; 2) Goal difference; 3) Number of goals scored; 4) Head-to-head results; 5) Wins; 6) Away goals; 7) Penalty points (sec 9.5); 8) 12-point sending off offences

== Results summary ==
Overall								Home						Away					
Pld	W	D	L	GF	GA	GD	Pts	W	D	L	GF	GA	GD	W	D	L	GF	GA	GD
16	5	2	9	15	24	−9	17	4	1	3	9	11	−2	1	1	6	6	13	−7

Last updated: 21 November 2026.
Source: Soccerstats

== Results by round ==
Round	1	2	3	4	5	6	7	10	11	12	13	8^{1}	14	9^{2}	15	16	17
Ground	A	H	A	H	H	A	H	A	H	A	A	A	H	H	H	A	H
Result	L	L	L	W	L	D	L	L	W	L	L	L	W	D	W	W	
Position	18	24	24	22	24	23	24	24	24	24	24	24	21	21	19	17▲	
Points	0	0	0	3	3	4	4	4	7	7	7	7	10	11	14	17	

Source: EFL
A = Away; H = Home; W = Win; D = Draw; L = Loss; P = Postponed
Notes:
- ^{1} Matchday 8 (vs. Leicester City) was postponed due to international call-ups.
^{2} Matchday 9 (vs. Mansfield Town) was postponed due to international call-ups.

== Matches ==
On 25 June, the League One fixtures were revealed.

Win Draw Loss Fixtures

15 August 2026 1	Cambridge United	3–2	Wigan Athletic	Cambridge
15:00 BST	Watts 3'; Appéré 34'; Heath 52'; Bradshaw (yellow card) 90+5'	Report	Perkins 69'; Higgins 73'	Stadium: Abbey Stadium; Attendance: 7,506; Referee: Alex Chilowicz

22 August 2026 2	Wigan Athletic	0–2	Leyton Orient	Wigan
15:00 BST	Power (yellow card) 18'	Report	Springett 15'; Kabia (yellow card) 35'; Akhamrich 58'; Hayden (yellow card) 73'; El Mizouni (yellow card) 90+2'	Stadium: Brick Community Stadium; Attendance: 9,317; Referee: Ross Martin

30 August 2026 3	AFC Wimbledon	1–0	Wigan Athletic	Wimbledon
14:00 BST	Sessegnon (yellow card) 73'; Harrison (yellow card) 75'; Smith (yellow card) 77'; Hippolyte 88'; Seddon (yellow card) 90+6'	Report	A.Harris (yellow card) 21'; Mellish (yellow card) 25'; Weir (yellow card) 45+3'; Carragher (yellow card) 65'	Stadium: Cherry Red Records Stadium; Attendance: 7,304; Referee: Andrew Humphries

2 September 2026 4	Wigan Athletic	3–1	MK Dons	Wigan
19:45 BST	Burns (yellow card) 8'; Weir 36', 74'; Power 48'; Costelloe (yellow card) 72'	Report	Sanders (yellow card) 18'; Gilbey (yellow card) 62'; Collins 81'	Stadium: Brick Community Stadium; Attendance: 7,415; Referee: Paul Howard

5 September 2026 5	Wigan Athletic	0–4	Stockport County	Wigan
12:30 BST	Barrett (yellow card) 27'; Carragher (yellow card) 31'	Report	Wootton 10'; Wood 19'; Diamond 21'; Gordon (yellow card) 35'; Glover 90'	Stadium: Brick Community Stadium; Attendance: 10,412; Referee: Thomas Parsons

12 September 2026 6	Sheffield Wednesday	0–0	Wigan Athletic	Sheffield
15:00 BST	Cooper (yellow card) 53'; Gray (yellow card) 90'	Report	Walsh (yellow card) 50'; Barrett (yellow card) 90+2'; Costelloe (yellow card) 90+3'	Stadium: Hillsborough; Attendance: 30,725; Referee: Seb Stockbridge

19 September 2026 7	Wigan Athletic	0–1	Wycombe Wanderers	Wigan
15:00 BST	Carragher (yellow card) 25'; Power (yellow card) 36'; Mellish (yellow card) 43'; Gray (yellow card) 61'; Weir (yellow card) 85'; Sze (yellow card) 90+4'	Report	Casey 68'; Henderson (yellow card) 86'	Stadium: Brick Community Stadium; Attendance: 8,643; Referee: Dean Whitestone

10 October 2026 10	Stevenage	1–0	Wigan Athletic	Stevenage
15:00 BST	Marçal 60'	Report	Burns (yellow card) 28'; Gray (yellow card) 53'; R.Walsh (yellow card) 69'; Carragher (yellow card) 90+4'	Stadium: Lamex Stadium; Attendance: 3,439; Referee: Abigail Byrne

17 October 2026 11	Wigan Athletic	1–0	Reading	Wigan
15:00 BST	Gray (yellow card) 52'; Hogan 71'; Carragher (yellow card) 74'	Report	Rinomhota (yellow card) 23'; Roberts (yellow card) 74'	Stadium: Brick Community Stadium; Attendance: 8,700; Referee: Edward Duckworth

20 October 2026 12	Oxford United	2–1	Wigan Athletic	Oxford
19:45 BST	Helik 44'; Brannagan (yellow card) 68'; Andrews 76'; Dembélé (yellow card) 79'; Harris (yellow card) 89'	Report	Weir (yellow card) 26'; Gray (yellow card) 31'; Saydee 69'; Murray (red card) 72'; Burns (yellow card) 85'	Stadium: Kassam Stadium; Attendance: 8,605; Referee: Emily Heaslip

24 October 2026 13	Huddersfield Town	2–1	Wigan Athletic	Huddersfield
12:30 BST	Bronkhurst 34'; Fletcher (yellow card) 39'; Bowat (yellow card) 48'; Humphreys (yellow card) 75'; Fernandes 80'; Harness (yellow card) 90+4'	Report	Perkins (yellow card) 6'; Barrett (yellow card) 12'; Mellish (yellow card) 43'; Gray (yellow card) 77'; Saydee 90+2'	Stadium: Accu Stadium; Attendance: 11,693; Referee: Martin Woods

27 October 2026 8	Leicester City	3–0	Wigan Athletic	Leicester
19:45 GMT	Smallbone (yellow card) 6'; Riis 17', 67'; Okoli (yellow card) 40'; Thomas (yellow card) 45+1'; O'Hora (yellow card) 48'; De Cordova-Reid 90+2' (pen.)	Report	Walsh (yellow card) 4'; Chilokoa-Mullen (yellow card) 9'; Miller (yellow card) 28'; Burns (yellow card) 61'	Stadium: King Power Stadium; Attendance: 26,511; Referee: Leigh Doughty
Note: Fixture was originally scheduled for 26 September, but was postponed due to international call-ups.

31 October 2026 14	Wigan Athletic	3–2	Bromley	Wigan
15:00 GMT	Saydee 18'; Miller 23'; R.Walsh (yellow card) 56'; Burrowes 58'; Barrett (yellow card) 82'	Report	Grant 6'; Saville 45+2' (yellow card) 90+4'; Whitely (yellow card) 65'; McKiernan (yellow card) 76'; Hondermarck (yellow card) 80'; Ifill (yellow card) 83'	Stadium: Brick Community Stadium; Attendance: 7,772; Referee: Martin Coy

3 November 2026 9	Wigan Athletic	0–0	Mansfield Town	Wigan
19:45 GMT		Report	Hewitt (yellow card) 44'; Sweeney (yellow card) 49'; Bolton (yellow card) 76'; Blake-Tracy (yellow card) 90+1'	Stadium: Brick Community Stadium; Attendance: 7,494; Referee: Scott Oldham
Note: Fixture was originally scheduled for 3 October but was postponed due to international call-ups.

14 November 2026 15	Wigan Athletic	2–1	Barnsley	Wigan
15:00 GMT	Murray 36'; Saydee (yellow card) 52'; Power (yellow card) 66'; Weir 75'	Report	Larkeche (yellow card) 20'; McGeehan (yellow card) 22', (goal) 57'	Stadium: Brick Community Stadium; Attendance: 8,484; Referee: Stephen Parkinson

21 November 2026 16	Blackpool	1–2	Wigan Athletic	Blackpool
12:30 GMT	Ashworth 42', (yellow card) 66'; Casey (yellow card) 80'	Report	Burns (yellow card) 26', (goal) 63'; Mellish 44'	Stadium: Bloomfield Road; Attendance: 10,622; Referee: Matthew Corlett

28 November 2026 17	Wigan Athletic	v	Plymouth Argyle	Wigan
15:00 GMT				Stadium: Brick Community Stadium

== Statistics ==
=== Appearances and goals ===
As of match played 21 November 2026

Players with no appearances are not included on the list

No.	Pos	Nat	Player	Total		League One		FA Cup		EFL Cup		EFL Trophy	
No.	Pos	Nat	Player	Apps	Goals	Apps	Goals	Apps	Goals	Apps	Goals	Apps	Goals
1	GK	(England) ENG	Joe Walsh	7	0	3+0	0	0+0	0	1+0	0	3+0	0
2	DF	(England) ENG	Connor Barrett	19	1	11+4	0	1+0	0	1+0	0	2+0	1
3	DF	(Wales) WAL	Morgan Fox	16	2	9+2	0	1+0	2	1+0	0	1+2	0
4	DF	(Scotland) SCO	Jeremiah Chilokoa-Mullen	9	1	4+2	0	0+0	0	0+0	0	3+0	1
5	DF	(England) ENG	Finley Burns	18	1	15+0	1	1+0	0	0+0	0	2+0	0
6	MF	(England) ENG	Jensen Weir	19	3	14+0	3	1+0	0	1+0	0	2+1	0
7	MF	(Scotland) SCO	Fraser Murray	16	2	8+4	1	1+0	0	1+0	0	1+1	1
8	MF	(England) ENG	Max Power	16	1	12+0	1	1+0	0	1+0	0	2+0	0
9	FW	(England) ENG	Sonny Perkins	14	1	7+3	1	0+1	0	1+0	0	1+1	0
10	MF	(England) ENG	Reggie Walsh	15	0	10+4	0	0+1	0	0+0	0	0+0	0
11	FW	(Republic of Ireland) IRL	Dara Costelloe	13	2	7+3	0	0+0	0	1+0	1	1+1	1
13	MF	(Wales) WAL	Luke Harris	3	0	1+2	0	0+0	0	0+0	0	0+0	0
14	MF	(England) ENG	Ryan Trevitt	5	0	1+3	0	0+1	0	0+0	0	0+0	0
16	DF	(England) ENG	Archie Harris	12	0	3+6	0	0+0	0	0+1	0	2+0	0
17	FW	(England) ENG	Akeel Higgins	7	1	2+2	1	0+0	0	0+1	0	2+0	0
18	MF	(England) ENG	Charlie Gray	11	0	9+1	0	0+1	0	0+0	0	0+0	0
19	MF	(England) ENG	Chris Sze	9	0	1+5	0	0+0	0	1+0	0	0+2	0
20	FW	(England) ENG	Callum McManaman	2	0	0+1	0	0+0	0	0+0	0	0+1	0
21	DF	(England) ENG	K'Marni Miller	13	2	3+6	1	0+1	0	0+1	0	2+0	1
22	DF	(England) ENG	Jon Mellish	20	2	9+7	1	1+0	1	1+0	0	0+2	0
23	DF	(Malta) MLT	James Carragher	18	0	14+0	0	1+0	0	1+0	0	2+0	0
24	FW	(England) ENG	Adam Moseley	1	0	0+0	0	0+0	0	0+0	0	1+0	0
25	FW	(Republic of Ireland) IRL	Scott Hogan	12	2	6+5	1	0+0	0	0+0	0	1+0	1
27	FW	(England) ENG	Bradley Burrowes	13	1	8+3	1	1+0	0	0+0	0	1+0	0
38	FW	(England) ENG	Christian Saydee	9	3	2+6	3	1+0	0	0+0	0	0+0	0
41	GK	(England) ENG	Joe Whitworth	14	0	13+0	0	1+0	0	0+0	0	0+0	0
51	MF	(England) ENG	Harrison Rimmer	2	1	0+0	0	0+0	0	0+0	0	2+0	1
53	DF	(England) ENG	Sam Bolland	2	0	0+0	0	0+0	0	0+0	0	1+1	0
55	MF	(England) ENG	Reece Greenhalgh	2	0	0+0	0	0+0	0	0+0	0	1+1	0
57	FW	(England) ENG	Cole Simms	1	0	0+0	0	0+0	0	0+0	0	0+1	0
Player(s) who featured but departed the club permanently during the season:
27	MF	(England) ENG	Tobias Brenan	1	0	0+0	0	0+0	0	0+1	0	0+0	0
