= Declan Perkins =

Irish footballer

Personal information
- Full name: Declan Oliver Perkins
- Date of birth: 17 October 1975 (age 51)
- Place of birth: Ilford, England
- Positions: Winger; forward

Youth career
- 1992–1994: Southend United

Senior career*
Years	Team	Apps	(Gls)
1994–1996	Southend United	6	(0)
1994–1995	→ Chelmsford City (loan)	5	(0)
1995	→ Cambridge United (loan)	2	(1)
- Happy Valley
- Sing Tao
- Hellenic
- Purfleet
1999	Finn Harps	1	(0)
1999–2000	Braintree Town		
2000–2003	Dulwich Hamlet		
2003	Ford United		
2003–2004	Waltham Forest		
2004	St Albans City	7	(1)
2004–2005	Barking & East Ham United	16	(3)
2005	Ilford		
- Redbridge

International career
	Republic of Ireland U18	8	
1994–1995	Republic of Ireland U21	4	(2)
- * Club domestic league appearances and goals

Declan Oliver Perkins (born 17 October 1975) is a former footballer who played as a forward. Born in England, he represented the Republic of Ireland internationally at youth level.

== Club career ==
Perkins began his career at Southend United, after playing for the club's academy. During his time at Southend, Perkins made six Football League appearances, as well as going out on loan to Chelmsford City and Cambridge United. Following his spell at Southend, Perkins played football in Hong Kong for Happy Valley and Sing Tao. After Hong Kong, Perkins joined South African club Hellenic, before signing for Purfleet. In October 1999, Perkins joined League of Ireland Premier Division club Finn Harps. Perkins only featured in one match day squad for Finn Harps on 23 October 1999 against Bohemians, before being released.

In late 1999, Perkins returned to England, signing for Braintree Town. In 2000, Perkins signed for Dulwich Hamlet, staying with the club for three years. Perkins subsequently played for Ford United and Waltham Forest, before signing for St Albans City in April 2004, where he made seven appearances, scoring once. Perkins joined Barking & East Ham United for the 2004–05 season, making 22 appearances, scoring 8 times in all competitions. Perkins' career finished with spells at Ilford and Redbridge.

== International career ==
Perkins represented the Republic of Ireland under-18 and under-21 levels. On 10 June 1995, Perkins scored twice for Ireland's U21s against Austria U21.

== Outside football ==
Perkins held acting roles in Dream Team and Mike Bassett: England Manager. In June 2015, Perkins was named vice chairman of Hackney Wick, helping sponsor the club whilst working as a publican in the area.

== Personal life ==
Perkins' sister is the actress Louise Lombard. Perkins' son, Sonny, currently plays for Wigan Athletic.
