= Louise Lombard =

English actress

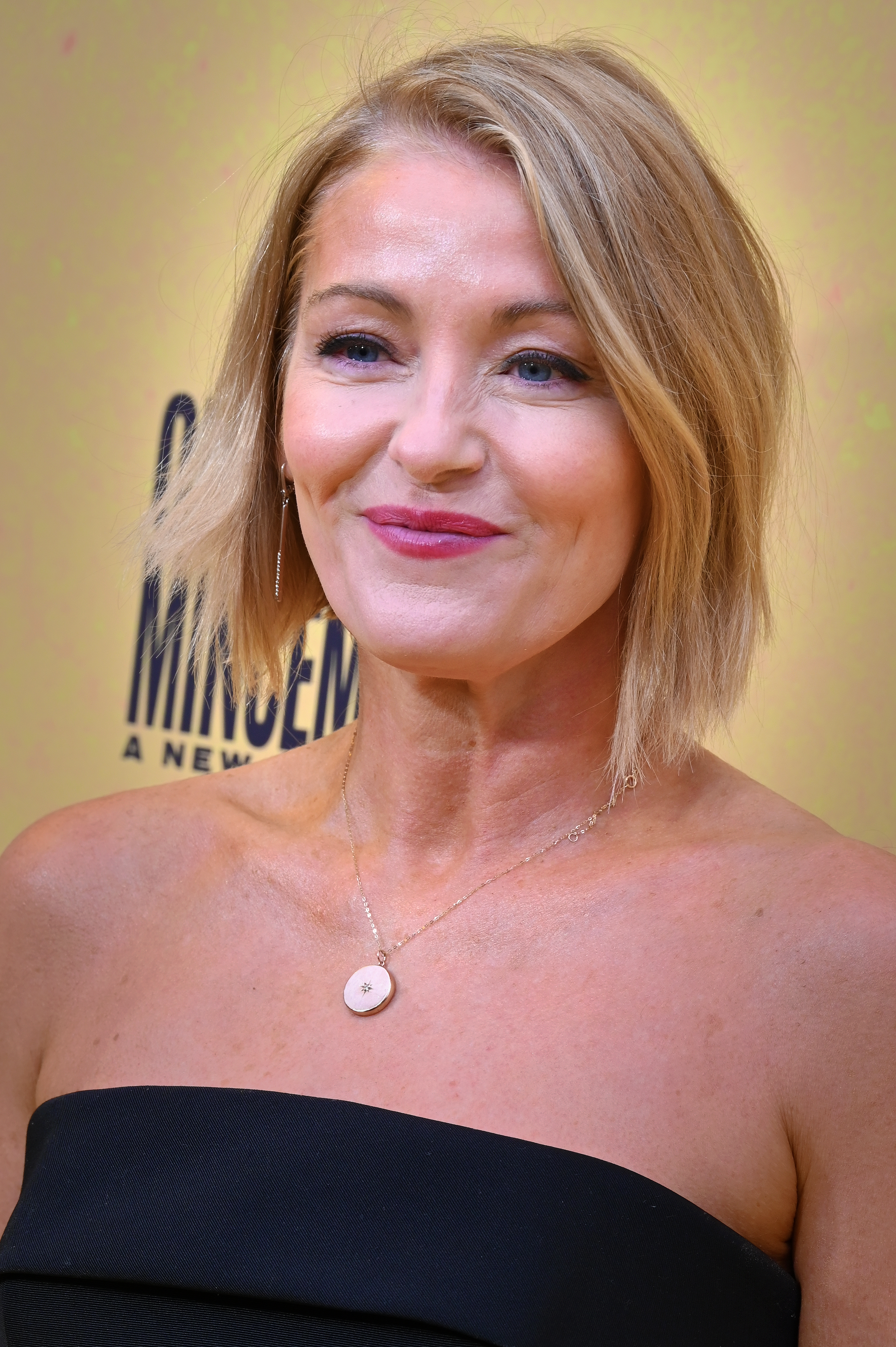
- Lombard in 2025
- Born: Louise Marie Perkins; 13 September 1970 (age 55); Redbridge, London, England
- Occupation: Actress
- Years active: 1988–present
- Children: 2
- Relatives: Declan Perkins (brother); Sonny Perkins (nephew)

Louise Lombard (born Louise Marie Perkins; 13 September 1970) is an English actress. She is known for her roles as Evangeline Eliott in the BBC drama series The House of Eliott (1991–94), Sofia Curtis in the CBS drama series CSI: Crime Scene Investigation (2004–11) and Trish in the After film series.

== Early life and education ==
Lombard was born in Redbridge, London, England, the fifth of seven children to Irish immigrant parents. One of her siblings is former footballer Declan Perkins.

Lombard began taking drama lessons when she was eight. She attended Trinity Catholic High School, a Roman Catholic school, from which she achieved nine O Levels. Lombard later studied English literature at St Edmund's College, Cambridge.

== Career ==
Lombard is best known for playing Evangeline Eliott in the 1990s television drama The House of Eliott. Her first big break was in the hit series Chancer, after which Lombard went on to star in the television dramas Bodyguards and Metropolis and several films including Gold in the Streets, My Kingdom and After the Rain.

In 1994, she was named one of People Magazine's 50 Most Beautiful People in the World. From 1998 to 2000, Lombard took a career break to study English literature at Cambridge.

In 1998, Lombard starred in Tale of the Mummy; and, in 1999, she starred in the film Esther, with F. Murray Abraham. In 1999, Lombard starred in After the Rain with Ariyon Bakare, Paul Bettany and Peter Krummack.

In 2004, Lombard appeared in the film Hidalgo. In November that same year, Lombard began a recurring role on the television series CSI: Crime Scene Investigation during Seasons 5 and 6. She made her first appearance in Season 5, Episode 7 ("Formalities"), playing Sofia Curtis, a crime scene investigator who later becomes a homicide detective. In September 2006, in the Season 7 premiere ("Built to Kill, Part 1"), Lombard began a regular role which she held throughout that season, until its finale ("Living Doll"). In September 2007, Lombard appeared in the Season 8 premiere ("Dead Doll") and was credited as a Special Guest Star.

In 2009, Lombard appeared in the backdoor pilot episode of NCIS: Los Angeles, which aired during Season 6 of the main NCIS series; Episodes 22 ("Legend Part 1") and 23 ("Legend Part 2"). She played Special Agent Lara Macy in charge of the NCIS Office of Special Projects in Los Angeles.

In March 2011, TVLine announced that Lombard would reprise her role as Sofia Curtis on CSI: Crime Scene Investigation in the Season 11 episode "Father of the Bride", which aired on 28 April 2011 and revealed that her character had been promoted to Deputy Chief.

In 2014, Lombard starred in the pilot for the Lifetime post-apocalyptic drama series The Lottery.

== Filmography ==
=== Film ===
Year	Title	Role	Notes
1988	Twice Upon a Time		
1998	Gold in the Streets	Mary	
1998	Tale of the Mummy	Samantha Turkel	
1999	After the Rain	Emma	
2001	My Kingdom	Kath	
2002	Heaven Must Wait	Rachel Blackmon	
2002	Claim	Ellen Brachman	
2004	Hidalgo	Lady Anne Davenport	
2004	Countdown	Catherine Stone	
2005	The Call	Woman	Short film
2011	Un Africain en hiver	Madame Dozin	
2019	Shadow Wolves	Lady Milton-Simon	
2020	After We Collided	Trish Daniels	
2021	After We Fell	Trish Daniels	
2022	After Ever Happy	Trish Daniels	
2023	Oppenheimer	Ruth Sherman Tolman	
2023	After Everything	Trish Daniels	

=== Television ===
Year	Title	Role	Notes
1989	The Forgotten	Kristina	TV movie
1989	Capital City	Louise	Recurring role (season 1)
1990	The Bill	Susan Peterfield	Episode: "Yesterday, Today, Tomorrow"
1990	Perfect Scoundrels	Alice	Episode: "Sweeter Than Wine"
1990	Casualty	Clare Jameson	Episode: "All's Fair"
1991	The Black Velvet Gown	Lucy Gallmington	TV movie
1991	Bergerac	Clarissa Calder	Episode: "Snow in Provence"
1991	Chancer	Anna	Main cast (season 2)
1991–94	The House of Eliott	Evangeline Eliott	Main cast
1992	Angels	Lucy	TV movie
1993	Shakers		TV movie
1996–97	Bodyguards	Liz Shaw	Main cast
1999	Esther	Esther	Miniseries
2000	Metropolis	Charlotte	Miniseries
2003	War Stories	Gayle Phelan	TV movie
2003	Second Nature	Dr. Harriet Fellows	TV movie
2004–07, 2011	CSI: Crime Scene Investigation	LVPD Detective Sofia Curtis	Recurring role (seasons 5–6, 8); Main cast (season 7); Guest (season 11-Episode: "Father of the Bride")
2007	Judy's Got a Gun	Judy Lemen	TV movie
2008	Kiss of Death	Kay Rousseu	TV movie
2009	NCIS	Special Agent Lara Macy	Episodes: "Legend: Part 1" / ": Part 2"
2010	Miami Medical	Karen	Episode: "All Fall Down"
2010	Stargate Universe	Gloria Rush	4 episodes
2012	Rogue	Wendy Hollingsworth	TV movie
2012	The Mentalist	Dean Nora Hill	Episode: "His Thoughts Were Red Thoughts"
2012	Dripping in Chocolate	Juliana Lovece	TV movie
2013	The Selection	Queen Amberly	Unsold pilot
2014	Star-Crossed	Saroya	Recurring role
2014	Grimm	Elizabeth Lascelles	Recurring role (season 4)
2015	A Student's Obsession	Stephanie	TV movie
2018–19	Lethal Weapon	Gillian	2 episodes
2019	SEAL Team	Claire North	Episode: "Backwards in High Heels"
2019	How to Get Away with Murder	Nora	Episode: "Be the Martyr"
2019	The Fix	Stephanie Reynolds	Episode: "Jeopardy!"
2019	Susan Hill's Ghost Story	Alice Merriman	TV movie
