= Sonny Perkins =

English footballer (born 2004)

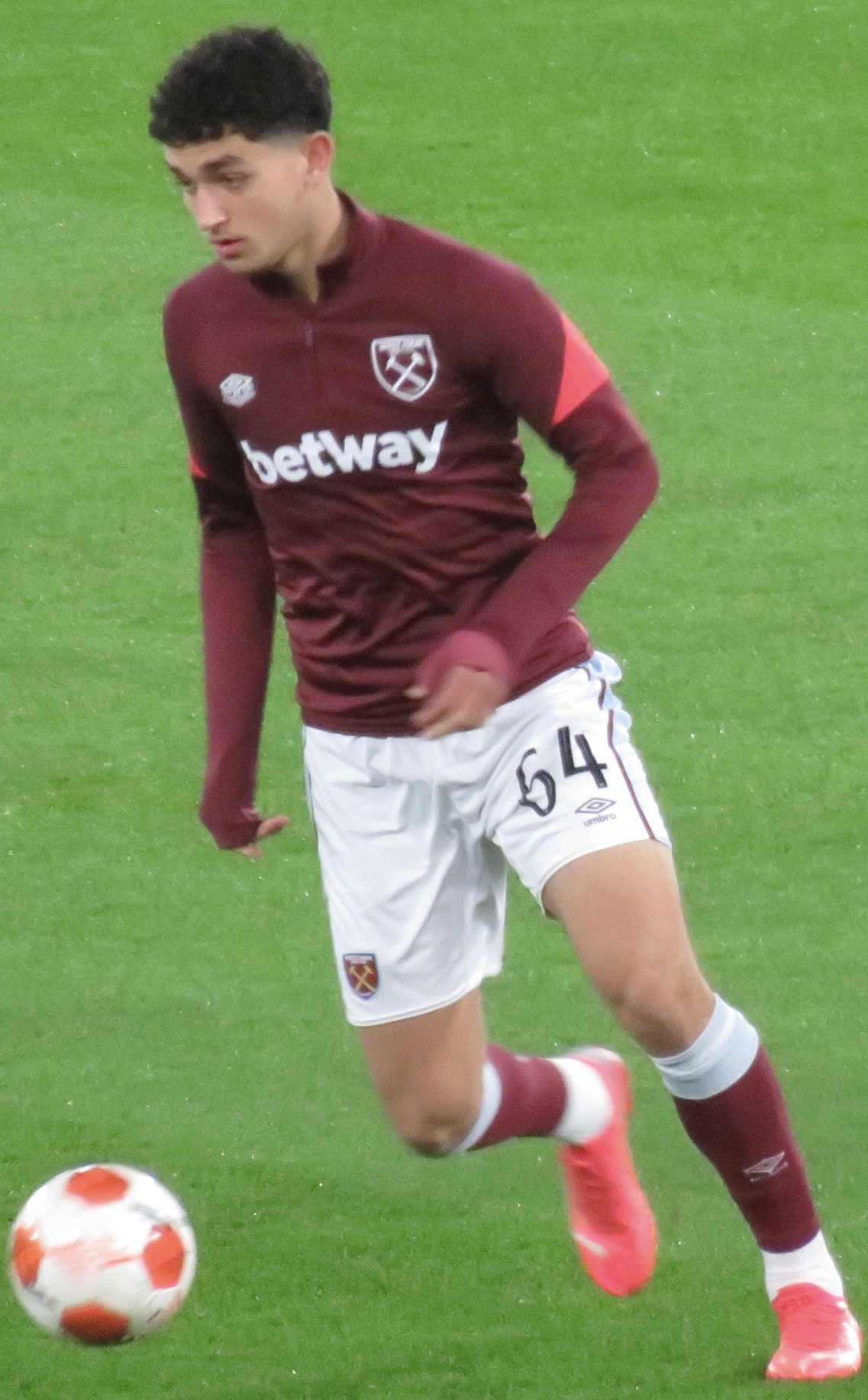
- Perkins warming up for West Ham United

Personal information
- Full name: Sonny Tufail Perkins
- Date of birth: 10 February 2004 (age 22)
- Place of birth: Waltham Forest, England
- Height: 1.78 m (5 ft 10 in)
- Position: Forward

Team information
- Current team: Wigan Athletic
- Number: 9

Youth career
- –2019: Leyton Orient
- 2019–2021: West Ham United

Senior career*
Years	Team	Apps	(Gls)
2021–2022	West Ham United	1	(0)
2022–2025	Leeds United	1	(0)
2023–2024	→ Oxford United (loan)	3	(0)
2024–2025	→ Leyton Orient (loan)	18	(2)
2025–2026	Leyton Orient	28	(2)
2026–	Wigan Athletic	7	(1)

International career^{‡}
2019	England U15	1	(0)
2020	England U16	3	(3)
2021–2022	England U18	10	(4)
2022–2023	England U19	6	(5)
- * Club domestic league appearances and goals as of 19:03, 3 October 2026 (UTC) ‡ National team caps and goals as of 12:34, 26 March 2023 (UTC)

Sonny Tufail Perkins (born 10 February 2004) is an English professional footballer who plays as a forward for EFL League One club Wigan Athletic.

== Club career ==
=== West Ham United ===
In 2019, Perkins joined West Ham United from Leyton Orient at under-15 level. On 25 November 2021, Perkins was involved in a West Ham senior matchday squad for the first time, being named on the bench for a UEFA Europa League group game against Rapid Wien, coming on as a 78th minute substitute. In July 2022, Perkins rejected West Ham's offer of a professional contract and left the club with immediate effect. He made three appearances for the club, one in the Premier League and two in the Europa League.

=== Leeds United ===
On 19 July 2022, he joined Leeds United signing a three-year contract. He made his debut for Leeds on 9 November 2022 in the starting line-up for the 1–0 EFL Cup third round defeat to Wolverhampton Wanderers. Perkins scored his first professional goal against Cardiff City at the Cardiff City Stadium in the FA Cup third round tie on 8 January 2023 when he came on as a second-half substitute, scoring the equaliser in stoppage time to earn a 2–2 draw for Leeds, forcing a replay.

==== Oxford United loan ====
On 25 August 2023, Perkins joined League One team Oxford United on loan for the remainder of the 2023–24 season. He made his first Oxford appearance as a late substitute in a 1–2 home league defeat to Port Vale on 2 September and his full debut in an EFL Trophy home defeat to Milton Keynes Dons on 19 September. He scored once, in a 5–0 victory over Chelsea U21 in the EFL Trophy group stage on 7 November 2023. On 4 January 2024, Leeds recalled Perkins from his loan because of his limited playing time at Oxford.

=== Leyton Orient ===
In June 2024, Perkins signed on loan for Leyton Orient for the 2024–25 season. He joined the club on a permanent deal in January 2025.

=== Wigan Athletic ===
In June 2026, Perkins was transferred to Wigan Athletic for an undisclosed fee, signing a two-year deal.

== International career ==
In July 2018, whilst still at Leyton Orient, Perkins was called up to England's under-15 side. In February 2020, Perkins scored a hat-trick for England U16 against the United States. On 18 October 2021, a month after his debut for the side, Perkins scored his first goal for England U18's in a 3–0 win against Russia.

On 21 September 2022, Perkins made his England U19 debut and scored during a 2–0 2023 U19 EURO qualifying win over Montenegro in Denmark.

Perkins is eligible to represent Pakistan as he is of Pakistani descent through his maternal grandfather.

== Style of play ==
Perkins' captain at West Ham, Mark Noble, praised Perkins' hold-up play, as well as his versatility, saying "he started in the No10 role and he's moved up to the centre-forward role for the U23s, and scored a lot of goals".

== Personal life ==
Perkins' father, Declan, is a former Irish youth international footballer. His aunt is the actress Louise Lombard.

== Career statistics ==
As of match played 22 September 2026

Appearances and goals by club, season and competition
Club	Season	League			FA Cup		League Cup		Continental		Other		Total	
Club	Season	Division	Apps	Goals	Apps	Goals	Apps	Goals	Apps	Goals	Apps	Goals	Apps	Goals
West Ham United U21	2021–22	—			—		—		—		2 (Note: Appearance(s) in EFL Trophy)	0	2	0
West Ham United	2021–22	Premier League	1	0	0	0	0	0	2 (Note: Appearance(s) in UEFA Europa League)	0	—		3	0
Leeds United U21	2022-23	—			—		—		—		3	1	3	1
Leeds United	2022–23	Premier League	0	0	2	1	1	0	—		—		3	1
Leeds United	2023–24	Championship	1	0	0	0	0	0	—		0	0	1	0
Leeds United	2024–25	Championship	0	0	0	0	0	0	—		—		0	0
Leeds United	Total		1	0	2	1	1	0	—		0	0	4	1
Oxford United (loan)	2023–24	League One	3	0	1	0	0	0	—		2	1	6	1
Leyton Orient (loan)	2024–25	League One	18	2	3	1	3	0	—		5	1	29	4
Leyton Orient	2024–25	League One	12	2	1	0	—		—		0	0	13	2
Leyton Orient	2025–26	League One	16	0	1	0	1	0	—		3	0	21	0
Leyton Orient	Total		28	2	2	0	1	0	—		3	0	34	2
Wigan Athletic	2026–27	League One	7	1	0	0	1	0	—		1	0	9	1
Career total			51	4	8	2	5	0	2	0	15	3	81	9

== Honours ==
=== Individual ===
- West Ham United Dylan Tombides Award: 2021–22
