= Andy Harris (footballer, born 1977) =

South African footballer

Personal information
- Full name: Andrew David Douglas Harris
- Date of birth: 26 February 1977 (age 49)
- Place of birth: Springs, South Africa
- Height: 5 ft 11 in (1.80 m)
- Position: Midfielder

Youth career
- 1993–1994: Liverpool

Senior career*
Years	Team	Apps	(Gls)
1994–1996	Liverpool	0	(0)
1996–1999	Southend United	72	(0)
1999–2003	Leyton Orient	149	(2)
2003–2005	Chester City	33	(0)
2005	→ Forest Green Rovers (loan)	12	(1)
2005–2006	Weymouth	46	(7)
2006–2009	Eastleigh	30	(2)
2009–2010	Weymouth		
- * Club domestic league appearances and goals as of 07:18, 26 April 2010 (UTC)

Andrew David Douglas Harris (born 26 February 1977) is a former professional footballer who played as a midfielder. He spent his whole playing career in England. He previously played in the Football League for Southend United, Leyton Orient and Chester City.

== Early life ==
He was born in Springs in South Africa.

== Playing career ==
Harris began with Liverpool but failed to make a first–team appearance at Anfield before he moved to Southend United in July 1996. After three years with the Shrimpers, Harris switched to Leyton Orient ahead of 1998–99. His four-year stint with Orient included an appearance at the Millennium Stadium against Blackpool in the Football League Division Three play–off final in May 2001. Despite being a near ever–present in his last three seasons with the club, Harris was released at the end of 2002–03 and joined Chester City on a free transfer, being described as a "major signing" by manager Mark Wright.

However, Harris was to start just 19 league games in two years at the club, the first ending with the club finishing as champions of the Conference National. His second season included a loan spell with Forest Green Rovers and ended with him joining Weymouth. During the 2005–06 season, Harris scored a shock equaliser for Weymouth in an FA Cup tie at Nottingham Forest and helped them win the Conference South championship. But he did not feature again after knee surgery and he dropped back into the Conference South with Eastleigh, with a loan move quickly becoming a permanent transfer on 10 October 2006.

On 26 May 2009 he moved back to Weymouth for their 2009–10 season in the Conference South. He retired in June 2010.

As Weymouth are a part-time club now, Harris has Moved into teaching and teaches a National Football Studies Course at Kingston Maurward College in Dorset.

== Personal life ==
Harris is a member of Mensa International, possessing an IQ of 153. He appeared on the ITV1 programme, Britain's Brainiest Footballers, in 2002.

His son Archie is also a footballer who was signed as right fullback by the AFC Bournemouth academy team, and is currently out on loan to Eastleigh Football Club. Archie is a Welsh citizen and has played for Welsh youth teams.

Andy's daughter Charlotte also plays as right fullback for AFC Bournemouth in the third tier of the English women's pyramid, having joined in February 2025. Charlotte is a citizen of South Africa and Wales and played for Wales in youth ranks.
