= Reggie Walsh =

English footballer (born 2008)

- Walsh with Wigan Athletic in 2026

Personal information
- Full name: Reggie Spencer Walsh
- Date of birth: 20 October 2008 (age 18)
- Place of birth: Chertsey, England
- Height: 1.76 m (5 ft 9 in)
- Position: Midfielder

Team information
- Current team: Wigan Athletic (on loan from Chelsea)
- Number: 10

Youth career
- –2025: Chelsea

Senior career*
Years	Team	Apps	(Gls)
2025–	Chelsea	0	(0)
2026–	→ Wigan Athletic (loan)	12	(0)

International career^{‡}
2023	England U15	4	(0)
2023–2024	England U16	8	(0)
2024–	England U17	6	(2)
2025–	England U18	7	(0)
2026–	England U19	6	(0)
- * Club domestic league appearances and goals ‡ National team caps and goals as of 18:40, 2 October 2026 2026 (UTC)

Reggie Spencer Walsh (born 20 October 2008) is an English professional footballer who plays as a midfielder for EFL League One club Wigan Athletic, on loan from Premier League club Chelsea.

== Club career ==
Walsh joined the youth academy of Premier League side Chelsea at the age of seven and was promoted to the club's under-18 team ahead of the 2024–25 season.

On 1 May 2025, Walsh made his senior debut for Chelsea against Djurgårdens IF in the 2024–25 UEFA Conference League semi-finals. He became Chelsea's third youngest ever player, only behind Ian Hamilton and Kingsley Whiffen. A week later, on 8 May, Walsh started the match against the same opponent, becoming Chelsea's youngest ever starter in a European competition at 16 years and 200 days, surpassing Shim Mheuka's previous record of 17 years and 137 days set earlier that season.

On 22 October 2025, two days after his 17th birthday, Walsh became the second youngest Englishman, behind former Arsenal midfielder Jack Wilshere, to play in the UEFA Champions League and became Chelsea's youngest ever debutant in the Champions League, surpassing an 11-year record previously held by Dominic Solanke.

On 19 August 2026, Walsh joined Wigan Athletic F.C. on loan for the 2026/2027 season.

== International career ==
Walsh is an England youth international and had represented England at under-15, under-16 and under-17 level. In 2024, he played for England during 2025 UEFA European Under-17 Championship qualification.

On 3 September 2025, Walsh made his England U18 debut during a 3–1 win over Uzbekistan.

On 21 October, Walsh was included in the England squad for the 2025 FIFA U-17 World Cup. He scored in a group stage victory over Haiti. Walsh came off the bench as a substitute during their round of 16 defeat by Austria.

== Style of play ==
Walsh plays as a midfielder. English news website football.london wrote in 2025 that he is a "technically gifted midfielder, who has often been used in the No.10 position".

== Career statistics ==
As of match played 27 October 2026

Appearances and goals by club, season and competition
Club	Season	League			FA Cup		League Cup		Europe		Other		Total	
Club	Season	Division	Apps	Goals	Apps	Goals	Apps	Goals	Apps	Goals	Apps	Goals	Apps	Goals
Chelsea	2024–25	Premier League	0	0	0	0	0	0	2 (Note: Appearances in UEFA Conference League)	0	0	0	2	0
Chelsea	2025–26	Premier League	0	0	0	0	1	0	1 (Note: Appearance in UEFA Champions League)	0	—		2	0
Chelsea	2026–27	Premier League	—		—		—		—		—		—	
Chelsea	Total		0	0	0	0	1	0	3	0	0	0	4	0
Chelsea U21	2025–26	—			—		—		—		2 (Note: Appearances in EFL Trophy)	0	2	0
Wigan Athletic (loan)	2026–27	League One	10	0	0	0	0	0	—		0	0	10	0
Career total			10	0	0	0	1	0	3	0	2	0	16	0

== Honours ==
Chelsea U18

- U18 Premier League – National Champions: 2025–26
- U18 Premier League – Southern Champions: 2025–26

Chelsea

- UEFA Conference League: 2024–25
