= Jeremiah Chilokoa-Mullen =

Scottish footballer (born 2004)

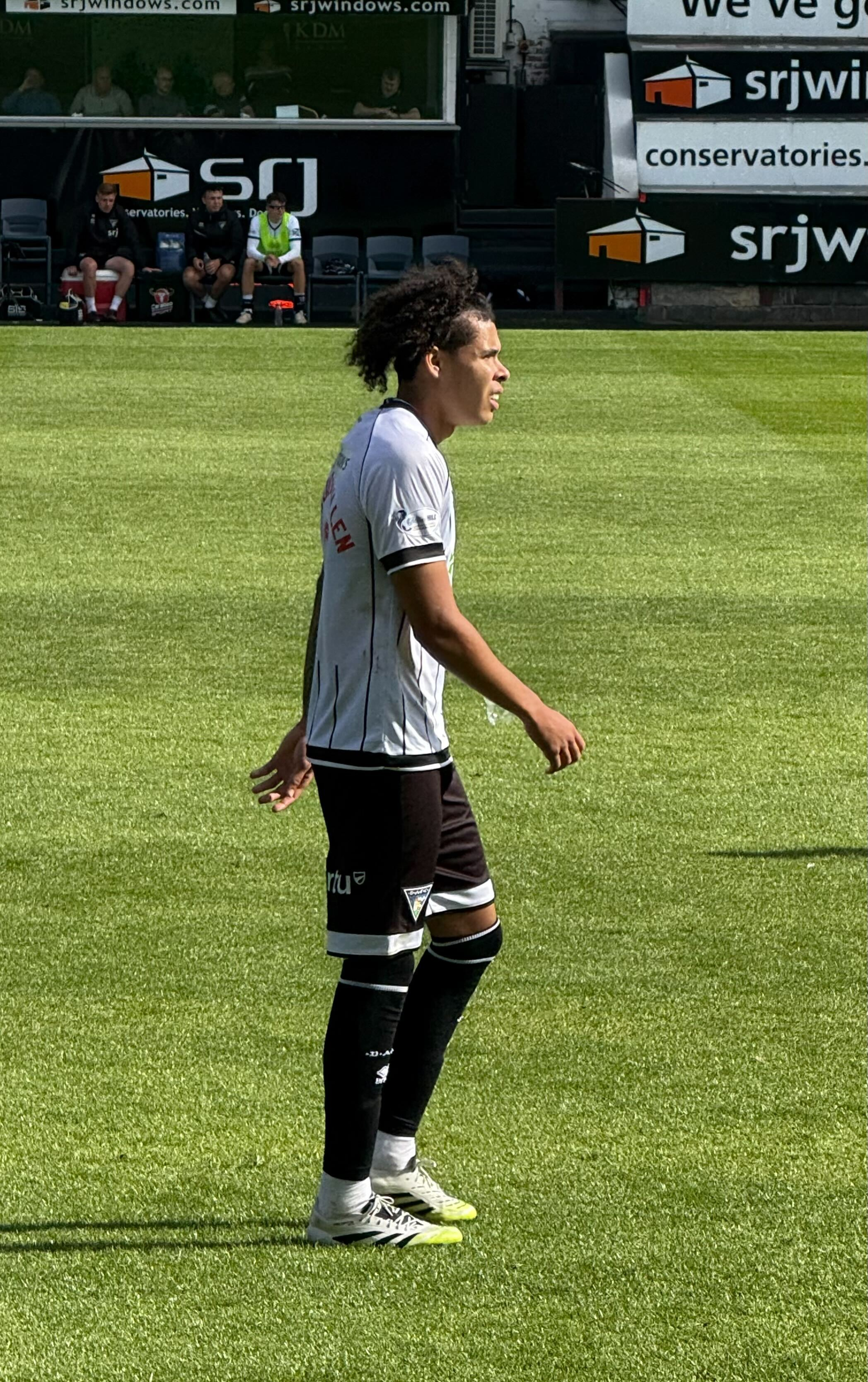
- Chilokoa-Mullen playing for Dunfermline Athletic in August 2025.

Personal information
- Full name: Jeremiah Chukwuedo Chilokoa-Mullen
- Date of birth: 17 June 2004 (age 22)
- Place of birth: Leeds, England
- Position: Defender

Team information
- Current team: Wigan Athletic
- Number: 4

Youth career
- –2020: Liverpool
- 2020–2023: Leeds United

Senior career*
Years	Team	Apps	(Gls)
2023–2025	Leeds United	0	(0)
2024	→ Inverness Caledonian Thistle (loan)	3	(0)
2025–2026	Dunfermline Athletic	43	(2)
2026–	Wigan Athletic	1	(0)

International career^{‡}
2021–2023	Scotland U19	5	(0)
2023–	Scotland U21	22	(3)
- * Club domestic league appearances and goals as of 13:04, 2 October 2026 (UTC) ‡ National team caps and goals as of 18:42, 16 November 2025 (UTC)

Jeremiah Chukwuedo Chilokoa-Mullen (born 17 June 2004) is a professional footballer who plays as a defender for EFL League One club Wigan Athletic.

== Career ==
=== Leeds United ===
Chilokoa-Mullen started his career in the youth setup at Leeds United before moving to Liverpool's youth setup. After failing to make the grade he moved back to Leeds United, rising through the under 18 and under 23 sides.

In January 2024, Chilokoa-Mullen was sent on loan to Inverness Caledonian Thistle in the Scottish Championship, making his senior debut in a 3–2 away win against Raith Rovers, before making 2 further league appearances & a cup appearance against Hibernian for the side before being recalled after suffering a back injury in March 2024, ruling him out of the remainder of the season.

=== Dunfermline Athletic ===
On 3 February 2025 Chilokoa-Mullen joined Scottish club Dunfermline Athletic for the remainder of the 2024–25 season with an option to extend further. Providing an immediate improvement to the Pars' defence, Chilokoa-Mullen won back to back player of the month awards for February and March 2025.

In June 2025, Chilokoa-Mullen signed a one year extension to remain at Dunfermline for the 2025–26 season.

=== Wigan Athletic ===
On 1 July 2026, Chilokoa-Mullen signed for League One club Wigan Athletic on an initial two-year deal for an undisclosed fee.

== International career ==
Chilokoa-Mullen was born in Leeds, England to a Scottish father and British Nigerian mother. He is a youth international for Scotland, having played for the Scotland U21s.

== Career statistics ==
=== Club ===
As of match played 22 September 2026

Appearances and goals by club, season and competition
Club	Season	League			National cup (Note: Includes FA Cup, Scottish Cup)		League cup (Note: Includes EFL Cup, Scottish League Cup)		Other		Total	
Club	Season	Division	Apps	Goals	Apps	Goals	Apps	Goals	Apps	Goals	Apps	Goals
Leeds United U21	2020–21	—			—		—		1 (Note: Appearance(s) in EFL Trophy)	0	1	0
Leeds United U21	2021–22	—			—		—		2	0	2	0
Leeds United U21	2024–25	—			—		—		2 (Note: Appearance(s) in National League Cup)	0	2	0
Leeds United U21	Total		—		—		—		5	0	5	0
Leeds United	2022–23	Premier League	0	0	0	0	0	0	—		0	0
Leeds United	2023–24	Championship	0	0	0	0	0	0	0	0	0	0
Leeds United	2024–25	Championship	0	0	0	0	0	0	—		0	0
Leeds United	Total		0	0	0	0	0	0	0	0	0	0
Inverness Caledonian Thistle (loan)	2023–24	Scottish Championship	3	0	1	0	0	0	0	0	4	0
Dunfermline Athletic	2024–25	Scottish Championship	13	0	1	0	0	0	1 (Note: Appearance(s) in Scottish Challenge Cup)	0	15	0
Dunfermline Athletic	2025–26	Scottish Championship	30	2	6	0	4	0	4 (Note: Appearances in Scottish Championship play-offs)	0	44	2
Dunfermline Athletic	Total		43	2	7	0	4	0	5	0	59	2
Wigan Athletic	2026–27	League One	1	0	0	0	0	0	2 (Note: Appearances in EFL Trophy)	0	3	0
Career total			47	2	8	0	4	0	12	0	71	2
