= Dara Costelloe =

Irish footballer (born 2002)

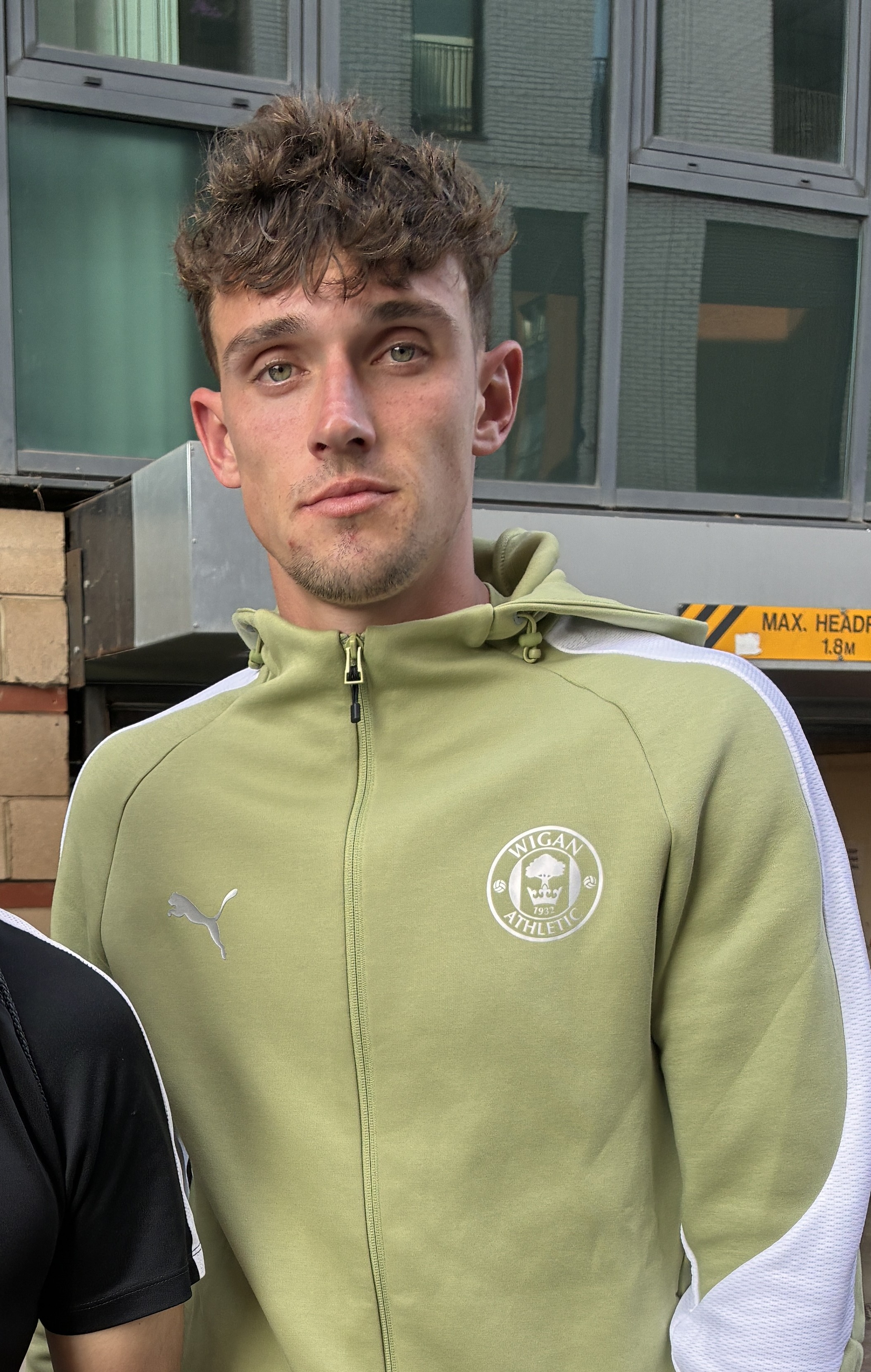
- Costelloe in 2025

Personal information
- Full name: Dara James Morgan Costelloe
- Date of birth: 11 December 2002 (age 23)
- Place of birth: Limerick, Ireland
- Height: 1.75 m (5 ft 9 in)
- Position: Forward

Team information
- Current team: Wigan Athletic
- Number: 11

Youth career
- 2017–2018: Galway United

Senior career*
Years	Team	Apps	(Gls)
2018–2020	Galway United	16	(0)
2021–2025	Burnley	4	(0)
2023	→ Bradford City (loan)	11	(0)
2023–2024	→ St Johnstone (loan)	12	(1)
2024	→ Dundee (loan)	16	(0)
2024–2025	→ Accrington Stanley (loan)	17	(5)
2025	→ Northampton Town (loan)	15	(6)
2025–	Wigan Athletic	43	(3)

International career
2023	Republic of Ireland U21	1	(0)
- * Club domestic league appearances and goals as of 5 September 2026

Dara James Morgan Costelloe (born 11 December 2002) is an Irish footballer who plays as a forward for EFL League One club Wigan Athletic. He has previously played for Galway United and Burnley, and has also played on loan for Bradford City, St Johnstone, Dundee, Accrington Stanley and Northampton Town.

== Club career ==
Costelloe was born in Limerick, County Limerick and was a part of the youth team at Aisling Annacotty before joining Galway United under-15 side in 2017. He made his first team debut for Galway a year later on 31 August 2018, aged 15, when he came on as a substitute in the 2–0 defeat to Finn Harps. This broke the record for the youngest every player to play for the first team. A day later he signed a first team contract having impressed for manager, Alan Murphy's, under-17 side.

=== Burnley ===
In February 2021, it was announced that Costelloe had signed a contract for Premier League side Burnley having trained and featured for the under-18 and under-23 setups since the previous summer. He signed a deal with Steve Stone's Academy side until June 2022. After two successful campaigns in the academy, he signed a new contract with Burnley in the summer of 2022. He finished as top scorer for the under-23 side with twelve goals and also made the bench for the first team for the last seven games of the Premier League season as Burnley were relegated.

Costelloe made his first team debut on 29 July 2022, starting the first league game of the season in a 1–0 win over Huddersfield Town at the Kirklees Stadium. It was also Vincent Kompany's managerial debut for the Clarets.

==== Bradford City (loan) ====
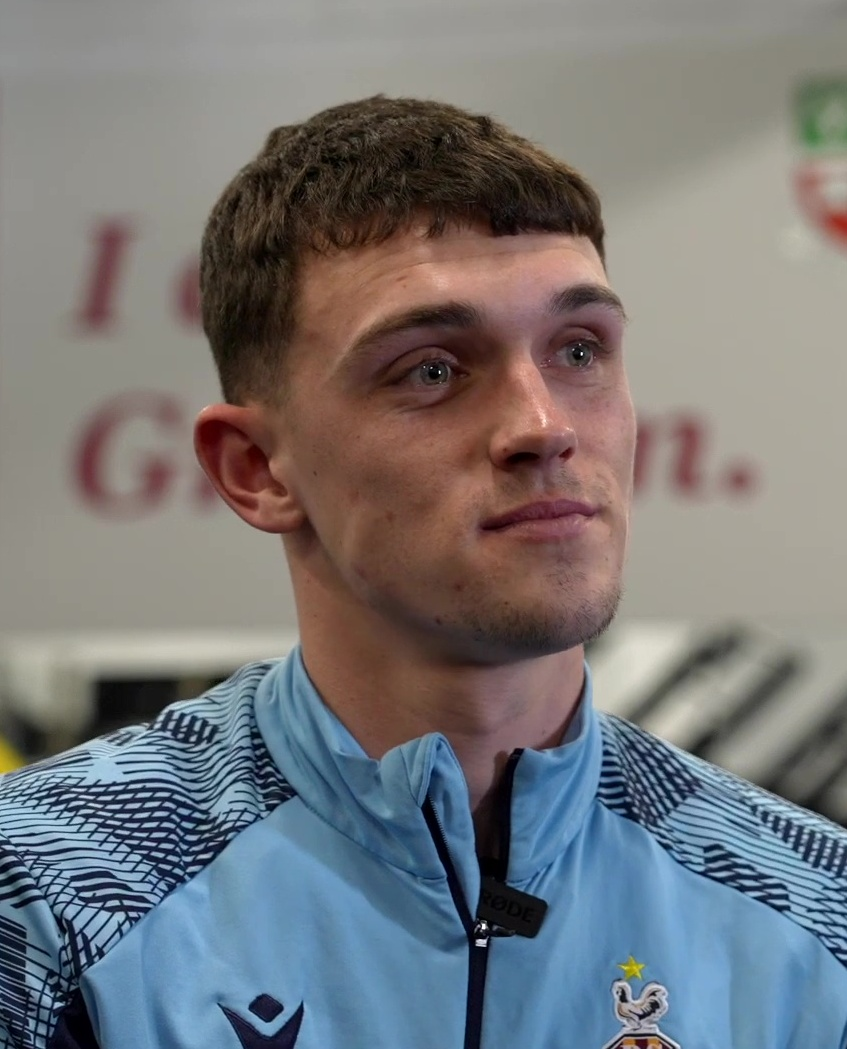
Dara Costelloe in 2023.

On 13 January 2023, Costelloe joined EFL League Two side Bradford City on loan for the remainder of the 2022–23 season.

==== St Johnstone (loan) ====
In August 2023, he signed on loan for St Johnstone of the Scottish Premiership. After being recalled on 1 January 2024, Costelloe immediately joined fellow Scottish side Dundee on loan until the end of the season. Costelloe made his debut for the Dark Blues on 20 January in a Scottish Cup game away to Kilmarnock. On 21 May 2024, Burnley said the player would be returning once the loan ended.

==== Accrington Stanley (loan) ====
In August 2024, Costelloe joined League Two side Accrington Stanley on a season-long loan deal. He made his debut from the bench in the league opener against Doncaster Rovers. Costelloe scored his first goal for Stanley on 1 October against Cheltenham Town. He was recalled from his loan in January 2025.

==== Northampton Town (loan) ====
On 3 February 2025, he signed a new contract with Burnley and moved on loan to League One club Northampton Town for the rest of the season. Costelloe made his debut for the Cobblers on 15 February. The following week, Costelloe scored his first goal for Northampton in a home win over Bristol Rovers.

=== Wigan Athletic ===
On 25 June 2025, Costelloe signed for EFL League One side Wigan Athletic for an undisclosed fee, on a three-year deal with the option to extend a further year. On 13 September, Costelloe scored his first goal for the Latics in a home league win over Doncaster Rovers.

== International career ==
Costelloe made his Republic of Ireland U21 debut on 16 June 2023, in a 2–2 draw with Ukraine U21 in a friendly played in Bad Blumau, Austria.

== Career statistics ==
As of match played 5 September 2026

Appearances and goals by club, season and competition
Club	Season	League			National cup (Note: Includes Scottish Cup, FA Cup)		League cup (Note: Includes League of Ireland Cup, EFL Cup)		Other		Total	
Club	Season	Division	Apps	Goals	Apps	Goals	Apps	Goals	Apps	Goals	Apps	Goals
Galway United	2018	LOI First Division	2	0	0	0	0	0	—		2	0
Galway United	2019	LOI First Division	14	0	0	0	2	0	—		16	0
Galway United	2020	LOI First Division	0	0	0	0	—		—		0	0
Galway United	Total		16	0	0	0	2	0	—		18	0
Burnley	2021–22	Premier League	0	0	0	0	0	0	—		0	0
Burnley	2022–23	Championship	4	0	0	0	2	0	—		6	0
Burnley	Total		4	0	0	0	2	0	—		6	0
Bradford City (loan)	2022–23	League Two	11	0	—		—		0	0	11	0
St Johnstone (loan)	2023–24	Scottish Premiership	12	1	—		—		—		12	1
Dundee (loan)	2023–24	Scottish Premiership	16	0	1	0	—		—		17	0
Accrington Stanley (loan)	2024–25	League Two	17	5	2	0	1	0	1 (Note: Appearances in EFL Trophy)	0	21	5
Northampton Town (loan)	2024–25	League One	15	6	—		—		—		15	6
Wigan Athletic	2025–26	League One	38	3	3	0	3	0	1	0	45	3
Wigan Athletic	2026–27	League One	5	0	0	0	1	1	1	1	7	2
Wigan Athletic	Total		43	3	3	0	4	1	2	1	52	5
Career total			134	15	6	0	9	1	3	1	152	17
