= Christian Saydee =

English footballer (born 2002)

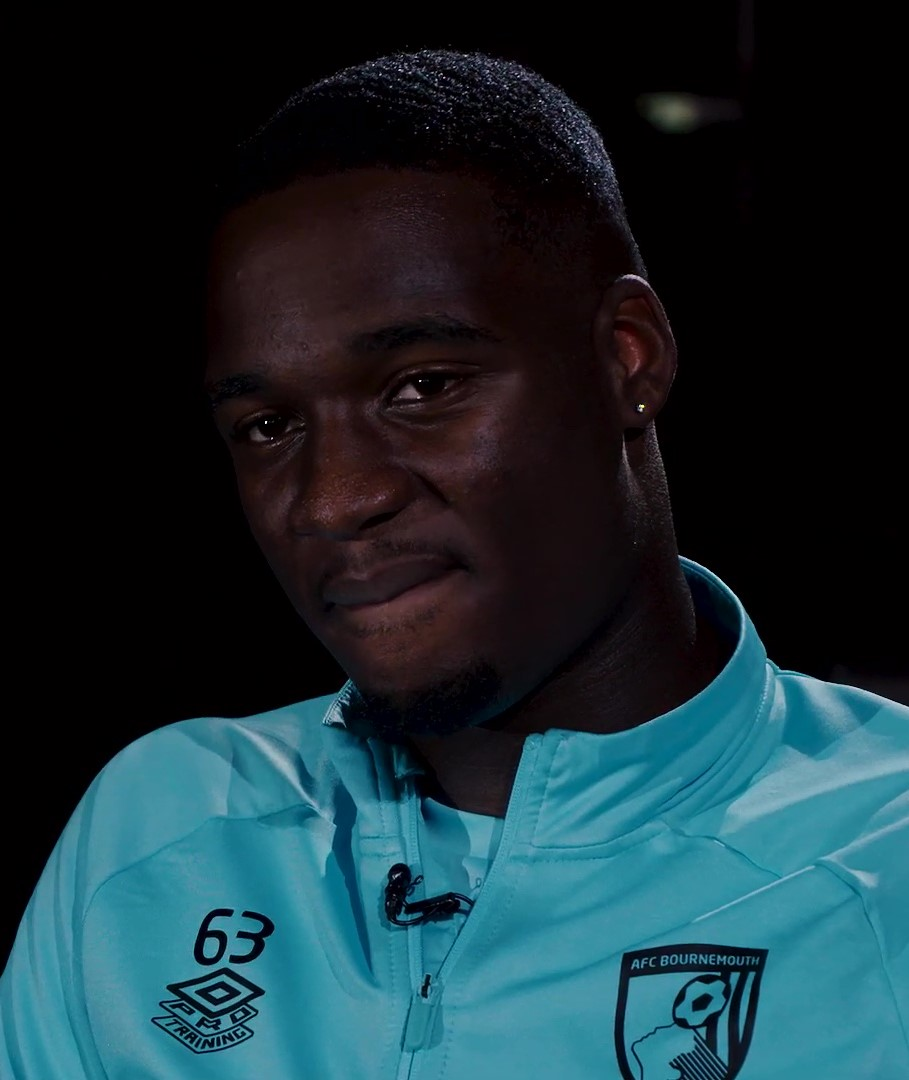
- Saydee with AFC Bournemouth in 2021

Personal information
- Full name: Christian Nyensuah Saydee
- Date of birth: 10 May 2002 (age 24)
- Place of birth: Hillingdon, England
- Height: 6 ft 0 in (1.84 m)
- Position: Forward

Team information
- Current team: Wigan Athletic
- Number: 38

Youth career
- 2010–11: Pro Touch SA
- 2011–2018: Reading
- 2018–19: AFC Bournemouth

Senior career*
Years	Team	Apps	(Gls)
2019–2023	AFC Bournemouth	2	(0)
2020	→ Poole Town (loan)	5	(2)
2020–2021	→ Weymouth (loan)	3	(0)
2022	→ Burton Albion (loan)	18	(0)
2023	→ Shrewsbury Town (loan)	35	(7)
2023–2025	Portsmouth	65	(5)
2025–	Wigan Athletic	41	(4)
- * Club domestic league appearances and goals as of 01:04, 4 October 2026 (UTC)

Christian Nyensuah Saydee (born 10 May 2002) is an English footballer who plays as a forward for EFL League One club Wigan Athletic.

== Career ==
=== AFC Bournemouth ===
Saydee joined the Pro Touch Soccer Academy at age nine, before joining the Reading Academy. He joined the AFC Bournemouth academy in 2018, having been released by Reading in the summer of that year.

In 2020, he was sent on loan to Poole Town in the English seventh division. After that, Saydee was sent on loan to English fifth division club Weymouth. On 31 July 2021, he debuted for Bournemouth during a 5–0 win over MK Dons, scoring a goal and getting an assist on his debut for the club. Saydee made his league debut for the Cherries in the opening fixture of the season; a 2–2 home draw against West Brom.

==== Loan to Burton Albion ====
On 31 January 2022, Saydee joined EFL League One side Burton Albion on loan for the remainder of the 2021–22 season.

==== Loan to Shrewsbury Town ====
On 1 September 2022, Saydee joined EFL League One side Shrewsbury Town on loan for the 2022–23 season. Saydee scored his first goal for the club, and his first in the EFL, in a 2–1 loss to Port Vale on 17 September. Saydee's good form in the tail-end of 2022 earned him Shrewsbury Town's player of the month award for December, scoring two goals across a victory against Bolton Wanderers and a loss to Cambridge United. He then scored a career-first brace in senior football, netting two goals in a 4–0 victory against former club Burton Albion on 14 January.

=== Portsmouth ===
On 14 June 2023, Saydee signed for EFL League One club Portsmouth for an undisclosed fee.

=== Wigan Athletic ===
On 19 June 2025, Saydee signed for EFL League One side Wigan Athletic for an undisclosed fee.

== Personal life ==
Born in England, Saydee is of Liberian descent.

== Career statistics ==
As of match played 2 May 2026

Appearances and goals by club, season and competition
Club	Season	League			FA Cup		EFL Cup		Other		Total	
Club	Season	Division	Apps	Goals	Apps	Goals	Apps	Goals	Apps	Goals	Apps	Goals
AFC Bournemouth	2020–21	Championship	0	0	0	0	0	0	0	0	0	0
AFC Bournemouth	2021–22	Championship	2	0	1	0	2	1	0	0	5	1
AFC Bournemouth	2022–23	Premier League	0	0	0	0	1	0	—		1	0
AFC Bournemouth	Total		2	0	1	0	3	1	0	0	6	1
Weymouth (loan)	2020–21	National League	3	0	—		—		—		3	0
Burton Albion (loan)	2021–22	League One	18	0	—		—		—		18	0
Shrewsbury Town (loan)	2022–23	League One	35	7	3	0	0	0	0	0	35	7
Portsmouth	2023–24	League One	36	2	0	0	2	1	4	1	42	4
Portsmouth	2024–25	Championship	29	3	1	0	1	0	—		31	3
Portsmouth	Total		65	5	1	0	3	1	4	1	73	7
Wigan Athletic	2025–26	League One	41	2	3	0	2	0	—		46	2
Wigan Athletic	2026–27	League One	0	0	0	0	0	0	—		0	0
Wigan Athletic	Total		41	2	3	0	2	0	—		46	2
Career total			164	14	8	0	8	2	4	1	184	17

== Honours ==
Portsmouth

- EFL League One: 2023–24
