= Bodyguards (TV series) =

- Genre: Crime drama Action
- Created by: Jeffrey Caine
- Written by: Jeffrey Caine; Julian Jones; Steve Griffiths
- Directed by: Ken Grieve; Christopher King; Mary McMurray
- Starring: Louise Lombard; Sean Pertwee; John Shrapnel; Pip Torrens
- Composers: Colin Towns; John Lunn
- Country of origin: United Kingdom
- Original language: English
- No. of series: 1
- No. of episodes: 7

Production
- Executive producer: Nigel Stafford-Clark
- Producers: Brian Donovan; Dominic Fulford
- Cinematography: Walter McGill
- Editor: Martin Sharpe
- Running time: 60 minutes
- Production companies: Zenith Entertainment; Carlton Television

Original release
- Network: ITV
- Release: 10 April 1996 – 5 June 1997

Bodyguards is a British television crime drama action series, broadcast on ITV, that focuses on the cases of a specialized bodyguard unit, the Close Protection Group, in service of the British government. The series starred Louise Lombard and Sean Pertwee as protagonists Ian Worrell and Liz Shaw. The series was the brainchild of Jeffrey Caine, known as the creator of The Chief and script editor of the James Bond movie GoldenEye.

A total of seven episodes were broadcast: a feature-length pilot which aired in 1996, which guest starred Josette Simon as a visiting dignitary, followed by a single series of six episodes in 1997. The series has never been released on VHS or DVD, but was uploaded in full to YouTube in March 2016 by a member of the original production crew. The series was also broadcast by GBC TV (Gibraltar) as part of its relaunch in early 1999. The series aired on Monday evenings at 9:30pm, and the series received a full repeat run later on in the year.

== Cast ==
- Louise Lombard as Liz Shaw
- Sean Pertwee as Ian Worrell
- John Shrapnel as Commander Alan MacIntyre
- Pip Torrens as Robert Ferguson
- Geoffrey Beevers as DAC James Henty
- Robert Horwell as DC Fitton

=== Series overview ===
Series	Episodes	Originally released	
Series	Episodes	First released	Last released
Pilot	1	10 April 1996	
1	6	1 May 1997	5 June 1997

== Episodes ==
=== Pilot (1996) ===
Title	Directed by	Written by	Original release date
"Pilot"	Robert Bierman	Jeffrey Caine	10 April 1996
An attack upon a VIP makes Commander MacIntyre suggest a close-protection unit, and he is promptly asked to head it. Among the new recruits is Ian Worrell, a former pilot and police officer. The hard training almost breaks Ian, but he shows some talent, and at a big conference, his first duty shift takes place. But when the conference starts, experienced bodyguard Liz Shaw discovers a plot to kill her protectee. When Ian tries to help, things become really complicated.

=== Series 1 (1997) ===
No.	Title	Directed by	Written by	Original release date
1	"A Choice of Evils"	Mary McMurray	Jeffrey Caine	1 May 1997
New bodyguard Ian is paired with professional Liz again, as the anniversary of war veterans comes up. Soon after, Ian's wife and daughter are taken hostages, and Ian is blackmailed to allow the killing of one of the veterans to take place. But when Liz finds out about the situation, her duty seems clear.
2	"Out of the Mouths of Babes"	Ken Grieve	Julian Jones	8 May 1997
A young boy witnesses the killing of a priest, and is therefore placed under protection by Liz and Ian. But threats against the family, including the kidnapping of the boy's little brother, forces Liz and Ian to take the boy to a safe house. However, security is breached, and the killers attack the safe house.
3	"Know Thine Enemy"	Christopher King	Jeffrey Caine	15 May 1997
During the visit of a high profile US citizen, Liz finds her competence questioned by the American bodyguards, and the whole unit becomes under scrutiny when security in the garage is compromised. But they have larger problems - a protester who has been making threats against the VIP, and someone else, with diplomatic contacts.
4	"Target"	Christopher King	Julian Jones	22 May 1997
A British businessman is on the hit list of some European hitmen, and Liz and Ian are assigned to protect him while he's in the UK. But when Liz and Ian leave the safe house for the night watch, the house is attacked, and only a coincidence prevented the businessman from being killed. It seems that whoever was behind the attack, had information from the inside.
5	"Stand Off"	Ken Grieve	Julian Jones	29 May 1997
Commander MacIntyre isn´t particularly pleased when his old mentor, who defected to Russia several years ago, wants to come back to the UK to visit his daughter's grave. But his duty is clear. The problem is that the bodyguard unit soon finds evidence of a mole somewhere inside her Majesty's secret service, someone who desperately wants the defector dead.
6	"The Killing Ground"	Mary McMurray	Steve Griffiths	5 June 1997
Liz and Ian are assigned to protect a Salman Rushdie-like writer who is hated by fundamentalist Muslims. But the first attack comes before they have even got to the safe place in the highlands, still in their car, on top of a bridge. They jump from the bridge and flee into the woods, but the writer is badly hurt in the fall, and the fundamentalists are not far behind them.

== Critical reception ==
Thomas Sutcliffe of The Independent said of the series; "When you start this job, you never think you're going to get bored," said one of the lumpy-jacketed characters in Bodyguards. It was a remark that might have been designed to extract a moan of sympathy from television reviewers, coming, as it did, halfway through this dim and derivative thriller, one of those professionals-with-guns series that give a distinguished theatrical actor the opportunity to look steely and say "shit". In this case, the man in question is John Shrapnel, taking the role of the sternly parental head of a police protection unit. His charges are played by Louise Lombard and Sean Pertwee, as well as disposable cannon-fodder who can be dispatched relatively early in the story to demonstrate that theirs is not just a nine-to-five job. In last night's episode, they were assigned to protect a businessman, back in England to give evidence before a select committee about a dodgy arms deal. Cue tough jargon ("Red One. Position set. Principal landed. 11.04") and a pretty standard plot involving conspiracy in high places."
