= Finley Burns =

English footballer (born 2003)

- Burns with Wigan Athletic in 2026

Personal information
- Full name: Finley Jack Burns
- Date of birth: 17 June 2003 (age 23)
- Place of birth: Southwark, England
- Height: 6 ft 5 in (1.96 m)
- Position: Centre-back

Team information
- Current team: Wigan Athletic
- Number: 5

Youth career
- 2012–2017: Southend United
- 2017–2021: Manchester City

Senior career*
Years	Team	Apps	(Gls)
2021–2026	Manchester City	0	(0)
2022	→ Swansea City (loan)	3	(0)
2023–2024	→ Stevenage (loan)	37	(0)
2024–2025	→ Hull City (loan)	9	(0)
2025–2026	→ Reading (loan)	32	(0)
2026–	Wigan Athletic	6	(0)

International career
2017–2018	England U15	5	(0)
2019	England U16	3	(0)
2019	England U17	1	(0)
2022	England U20	3	(0)
- * Club domestic league appearances and goals as of 14:06, 5 October 2026 (UTC)

Finley Jack Burns (born 17 June 2003) is an English professional footballer who plays as a centre-back for EFL League One club Wigan Athletic.

== Club career ==
=== Manchester City ===
In January 2017 it was confirmed that Burns would leave Southend United to join Manchester City for a reported fee of £175,000. On 21 September 2021 he made his professional debut when he was named in the starting line up for Manchester City's EFL Cup 6–1 win against Wycombe Wanderers.

On 30 January 2022, Burns joined EFL Championship side Swansea City on loan for the remainder of the 2021–22 season. Burns made his EFL Championship debut on 13 February 2022.

On 1 August 2023, Burns signed for League One club Stevenage on a season-long loan deal.

On 9 August 2024, Burns joined EFL Championship club Hull City on a season-long loan. He made his debut the next day, the opening day of the 2024–25 season. Burns came off the bench, replacing fellow new signing Marvin Mehlem, in the last moments of the Tigers' 1–1 home draw with Bristol City.

On 7 July 2025, Burns joined League One side Reading on a season-long loan.

=== Wigan Athletic ===
On 14 August 2026, Burns joined League One club Wigan Athletic on an initial three-year deal with the option for a further year.

== International career ==
Burns has represented England at youth level.

On 21 September 2022, Burns made his England U20 debut during a 3–0 victory over Chile at the Pinatar Arena.

== Career statistics ==
As of end of 22 September 2026

Appearances and goals by club, season and competition
Club	Season	League			FA Cup		League Cup		Other		Total	
Club	Season	Division	Apps	Goals	Apps	Goals	Apps	Goals	Apps	Goals	Apps	Goals
Manchester City U21	2019–20	—			—		—		1 (Note: Appearance(s) in EFL Trophy)	0	1	0
Manchester City U21	2020–21	—			—		—		2	0	2	0
Manchester City U21	2021–22	—			—		—		2	0	2	0
Manchester City U21	Total		—		—		—		5	0	5	0
Manchester City	2021–22	Premier League	0	0	0	0	1	0	0	0	1	0
Swansea City (loan)	2021–22	Championship	3	0	0	0	0	0	—		3	0
Stevenage (loan)	2023–24	League One	37	0	3	0	2	0	1	0	43	0
Hull City (loan)	2024–25	Championship	9	0	1	0	1	0	—		11	0
Reading (loan)	2025–26	League One	32	0	0	0	1	0	0	0	33	0
Wigan Athletic	2026–27	League One	6	0	0	0	0	0	2	0	8	0
Career total			87	0	4	0	5	0	8	0	104	0
