= Llyton Chapman =

English football (born 2005)

- Chapman with Wigan Athletic in 2026

Personal information
- Full name: Llyton Levi Chapman
- Date of birth: 31 July 2005 (age 21)
- Position: Full-back

Team information
- Current team: Wigan Athletic
- Number: 15

Youth career
- –2021: Sheffield United
- 2021–2024: Oldham Athletic
- 2024–2026: Wigan Athletic

Senior career*
Years	Team	Apps	(Gls)
2023–2024	Oldham Athletic	0	(0)
2023	→ Northwich Victoria (loan)		
2023–2024	→ Chadderton (loan)		
2026–	Wigan Athletic	10	(0)
- * Club domestic league appearances and goals as of 17:27, 21 August 2026 (UTC)

Llyton Levi Chapman (born 31 July 2005) is an English footballer who plays as a full-back for EFL League One club Wigan Athletic.

== Career ==
In July 2021, Chapman joined Oldham Athletic at under-16s level on a two-year deal following a spell with the Sheffield United academy. He was offered a new deal at the end of the 2022–23 season. He spent time on loan with Northwich Victoria and Chadderton in the 2023–24 season.

=== Wigan Athletic ===
In August 2024, Chapman joined the Wigan Athletic academy following a successful trial period. Having initially joined the club as an under-21 trialist, he impressed first-team manager Shaun Maloney to earn a place in the first-team squad for friendlies against Chorley and AFC Fylde.

On 21 February 2026, he made his debut as a second-half substitute in a 4–2 defeat to Stockport County. He made his first start two weeks later, manager Gary Caldwell admitting that he was not aware of the defender when he first joined the club three weeks prior, going on to cement his place as a starter.

On 23 June 2026, Chapman signed a new three-year contract with the Latics.

== Career statistics ==
As of match played 15 August 2026

Appearances and goals by club, season and competition
Club	Season	League			FA Cup		League Cup		Other		Total	
Club	Season	Division	Apps	Goals	Apps	Goals	Apps	Goals	Apps	Goals	Apps	Goals
Wigan Athletic	2025–26	League One	9	0	0	0	0	0	0	0	9	0
Wigan Athletic	2026–27	League One	1	0	0	0	0	0	0	0	1	0
Career total			10	0	0	0	0	0	0	0	10	0
