= Akeel Higgins =

English footballer (born 2005)

Personal information
- Full name: Akeel Adriano Billy Higgins
- Date of birth: 24 July 2005 (age 21)
- Place of birth: Birmingham, England
- Positions: Left midfielder; left winger; attacking midfielder

Team information
- Current team: Wigan Athletic
- Number: 17

Youth career
- 2017–2024: West Bromwich Albion

Senior career*
Years	Team	Apps	(Gls)
2024–2026	West Bromwich Albion	0	(0)
2025–2026	→ Exeter City (loan)	27	(1)
2026–	Wigan Athletic	3	(1)
- * Club domestic league appearances and goals as of 7 October 2026 (UTC)

Akeel Adriano Billy Higgins (born 24 July 2005) is an English professional footballer who plays as a left midfielder or left winger for EFL League One club Wigan Athletic.

== Club career ==
=== West Bromwich Albion ===
Higgins joined West Bromwich Albion at under-13s level. He signed his first professional contract with the club on 7 July 2023, penning a two-year deal until 2025. He made his professional debut for the club on 7 January 2024, in a 4–1 win against Aldershot Town in the FA Cup. On 3 July 2025, he signed a new one-year contract with the club.

On 1 September 2025, Higgins joined League One side Exeter City on a season-long loan. He made his debut for the club on 6 September 2025, in a 1–0 defeat to Rotherham United. He scored his first goal for the club on 23 October 2025, in a 2–0 win against Plymouth Argyle in the Devon Derby.

=== Wigan Athletic ===
On 3 July 2026, Higgins joined League One side Wigan Athletic on a two-year contract. He made his debut for the club on 8 August 2026, in a 1–1 draw with Barnsley in the EFL Cup, which Wigan lost on penalties. He scored his first goal for the club a week later on 15 August 2026, in a 3–2 defeat to Cambridge United.

== Career statistics ==
As of match played 22 August 2026

Appearances and goals by club, season and competition
Club	Season	League			FA Cup		League Cup		Other		Total	
Club	Season	Division	Apps	Goals	Apps	Goals	Apps	Goals	Apps	Goals	Apps	Goals
West Bromwich Albion	2023–24	Championship	0	0	1	0	0	0	—		1	0
West Bromwich Albion	2024–25	Championship	0	0	0	0	0	0	—		0	0
West Bromwich Albion	2025–26	Championship	0	0	0	0	0	0	—		0	0
West Bromwich Albion	Total		0	0	1	0	0	0	0	0	1	0
Exeter City (loan)	2025–26	League One	27	1	3	1	0	0	1 (Note: Appearances in EFL Trophy)	0	31	2
Wigan Athletic	2026–27	League One	2	1	0	0	1	0	1	0	4	1
Career total			29	2	4	1	1	0	2	0	36	3
