= Charlie Gray (footballer) =

English footballer (born 2006)

- Gray with Wigan Athletic in 2026

Personal information
- Full name: Charlie George Gray
- Date of birth: 22 February 2006 (age 20)
- Place of birth: Manchester, England
- Position: Defensive midfielder

Team information
- Current team: Wigan Athletic (on loan from Manchester City)

Youth career
- 2014–2025: Manchester City

Senior career*
Years	Team	Apps	(Gls)
2025–	Manchester City	0	(0)
2026–	→ Wigan Athletic (loan)	10	(0)
- * Club domestic league appearances and goals as of 04:35, 21 August 2026 (UTC)

Charlie George Gray (born 22 February 2006) is an English professional footballer who plays as a defensive midfielder for EFL League One club Wigan Athletic, on loan from Premier League club Manchester City.

== Club career ==
Gray is a product of Manchester City's youth academy since he was a U9 in 2014. On 14 July 2022, he signed a scholarship contract with the club. He was named the 2024–25 EDS Players’ Player of the Season. He made his senior and professional debut with Manchester City as a substitute in a 2–0 EFL Cup win against Brentford on 17 December 2025.

Gray joined League One club Wigan Athletic on 19 August 2026 on a season-long loan deal.

== International career ==
In October 2020, Gray was called up on standby for the England U20s.
