= Archie Harris (footballer) =

Welsh footballer (born 2004)

- Harris playing for Wigan Athletic in 2026

Personal information
- Full name: Archie Andrew Philip Harris
- Date of birth: 27 December 2004 (age 21)
- Place of birth: Liverpool, England
- Position: Defender

Team information
- Current team: Wigan Athletic
- Number: 16

Youth career
- 2016–2023: Bournemouth

Senior career*
Years	Team	Apps	(Gls)
2023–2026	Bournemouth	0	(0)
2023	→ Poole Town (loan)	2	(0)
2023–2024	→ Torquay United (loan)	8	(0)
2024	→ Truro City (loan)	2	(0)
2025–2026	→ Eastleigh (loan)	41	(0)
2026–	Wigan Athletic	5	(0)

International career^{‡}
2025–	Wales U21	9	(1)
- * Club domestic league appearances and goals as of 13:10, 4 October 2026 (UTC) ‡ National team caps and goals as of 09:43, 8 October 2026 (UTC)

Archie Andrew Philip Harris (born 27 December 2004) is a professional footballer who plays as a defender for EFL League One club Wigan Athletic. He is a Wales under-21 international.

== Early life ==
Born in Liverpool, Harris grew up in Dorset, and was educated at Budmouth College. He joined the academy at AFC Bournemouth at the age of 11.

== Career ==
=== Bournemouth ===
Harris made his debut in senior football during the 2023–24 season when he was loaned out to Poole Town of the Southern Football League, making two appearances for the club. He had additional loan spells that season with National League South clubs Torquay United and Truro City.

In the 2024–25 season, Harris was included in Bournemouth's matchday squad for the first time, but did not make any first-team appearances for the club.

He spent the 2025–26 season on loan with National League club Eastleigh. He made 41 league appearances for the club, providing eight assists, and received the club's Young Player of the Year award.

=== Wigan Athletic ===
On 6 August 2026, Harris was transferred to EFL League One club Wigan Athletic for an undisclosed fee, following a successful trial with the club. He made his debut on 8 August in the club's EFL Cup defeat against Barnsley.

=== International career ===
Harris is a Welsh youth international, and has appeared for Wales U21.

== Personal life ==
Harris is the son of Andy Harris, who was a professional footballer for Southend United, Leyton Orient and Chester City. His sister, Charlotte, plays women's football for AFC Bournemouth.
