= K'Marni Miller =

English footballer (born 2005)

- Miller in 2026

Personal information
- Full name: K'Marni Leigh Miller
- Date of birth: 9 November 2005 (age 21)
- Place of birth: Huddersfield, England
- Position: Defender

Team information
- Current team: Wigan Athletic
- Number: 21

Youth career
- –2024: Guiseley
- 2024–: Wigan Athletic

Senior career*
Years	Team	Apps	(Gls)
2024–	Wigan Athletic	2	(0)
2025	→ Radcliffe (loan)	3	(0)
- * Club domestic league appearances and goals as of 17:24, 16 November 2025 (UTC)

K'Marni Leigh Miller (born 9 November 2005) is an English footballer who plays as a defender for EFL League One club Wigan Athletic.

== Career ==
Born in Huddersfield, Miller began his career with the Guiseley before joining the Wigan Athletic academy in September 2024 following a successful trial.

On 8 October 2024, Miller made his senior debut in an EFL Trophy victory over Carlisle United. On 19 October 2024, he made his league debut as a half-time substitute in a 2–0 defeat to Cambridge United. Manager Shaun Maloney revealed after his league debut that Miller was intended to have been playing with the reserves, an injury to Luke Robinson giving him an opportunity in the first-team.

On 14 November 2025, Miller joined National League North club Radcliffe on a two-month loan.

== Career statistics ==
As of match played 7 October 2025

Appearances and goals by club, season and competition
Club	Season	League			FA Cup		League Cup		Other		Total	
Club	Season	Division	Apps	Goals	Apps	Goals	Apps	Goals	Apps	Goals	Apps	Goals
Wigan Athletic	2024–25	League One	2	0	0	0	0	0	2 (Note: Appearance(s) in EFL Trophy)	0	4	0
Wigan Athletic	2025–26	League One	0	0	0	0	0	0	1	0	1	0
Career total			2	0	0	0	0	0	3	0	5	0
