= Wigan Athletic F.C. =

Association football club in Greater Manchester, England

Wigan Athletic
- Full name: Wigan Athletic Football Club
- Nicknames: The Latics; Tics
- Founded: 1932; 94 years ago
- Ground: Brick Community Stadium
- Capacity: 25,138
- Owner: Mike Danson
- Chairman: Ben Goodburn
- Manager: Gary Caldwell
- League: EFL League One
- 2025–26: EFL League One, 16th of 24
- Website: wiganathletic.com
Home colours	Away colours

Wigan Athletic Football Club is a professional association football club based in Wigan, Greater Manchester, England. The team competes in the EFL League One, the third level of the English football league system.

Founded in 1932, they have played at the 25,138-seat Brick Community Stadium since 1999, before which they played at Springfield Park. Their colours are blue and white stripes, although all-blue shirts have been common throughout the club's history. The club regards Bolton Wanderers as its primary derby rival.

Wigan competed in the Cheshire County League for the first nine seasons of the club's existence, winning three league titles before being placed in the Lancashire Combination in 1947. It spent 14 years in the Lancashire Combination and secured four league titles during this time. It spent 1961 to 1968 back in the Cheshire County League, picking up another league title in 1964–65. Invited to become a founder member of the Northern Premier League in 1968, the club won two league titles and also reached the FA Trophy final in 1973. Wigan was elected to the Football League in 1978 and was promoted out of the Fourth Division in 1981–82. The club won the Associate Members' Cup in 1985, but was relegated back into the fourth tier in 1993. It won the Third Division title in 1996–97, the Football League Trophy in 1999 and the Second Division in 2002–03, before securing promotion out of the Championship in 2004–05.

Wigan lost in the League Cup final in 2006 and won the FA Cup in 2013, beating Manchester City in the final. However, the club was relegated later that year, bringing its eight-season stay in the Premier League to an end. The FA Cup success did, though, gain it a place in the UEFA Europa League group stages the following season. Relegated from the Championship in 2015, the club won the League One title in 2015–16 and repeated this feat in 2017–18 after another relegation. On 1 July 2020, less than a month after a change of ownership, it was placed into administration and was relegated from the Championship due to the subsequent points deduction. After narrowly avoiding relegation to League Two in 2020–21 under new ownership, Wigan won the League One title for a fourth time in 2021–22, but a year later were again relegated from the Championship following two further points deductions. Additional deductions of points were made in May 2023, meaning the club started the 2023–24 League One season with minus eight points.

== History ==
=== Non-League football: 1932–1978 ===
Wigan Athletic was formed in 1932, following the winding-up of Wigan Borough the year before. The establishment of Wigan Athletic was the fifth attempt to create a stable professional football club in the town following the demise of Wigan County, Wigan United, Wigan Town and Wigan Borough. The town's die-hard football enthusiasts planned the rebirth of a town team, and a public meeting was held at the Queen's Hall presided over by the then Mayor of Wigan, Councillor W.A. Hipwood, and Callum Roper, who called on the town to keep up its reputation for producing fine sportsmen by keeping intact an Association Football team as well as the Rugby League team. A committee was elected and a new club was formed, Wigan Athletic. Springfield Park, the former home of Wigan Borough, was purchased by the club for £2,850 from the owners of the Woodhouse Lane dog track. Despite their initial application being turned down, Wigan Athletic were elected into the Cheshire County League following the resignation of Manchester Central. The club had also made the first of many attempts to be admitted into the Football League, but failed to receive a single vote. On 27 August 1932, Wigan Athletic played their first-ever league game against Port Vale Reserves. The team played in red and white shirts with black shorts.

Wigan Athletic won its first honours in the 1933–34 season, finishing top of the Cheshire League, despite being based in neighbouring Lancashire. In the following season the club won a second league championship and also entered the FA Cup for the first time, defeating Carlisle United 6–1 in the first round – a cup record for the biggest victory by a non-League club over a League club. In the 1935–36 season, the club won its third consecutive Cheshire League title and the Lancashire Junior Cup.

After the Second World War, Wigan Athletic adopted their present-day blue and white colours. The club struggled to assemble a competitive side and finished bottom of the league in 1946–47 season. Despite their pre-war success, the club failed to gain re-election and was replaced by Winsford United. The club joined the Lancashire Combination, winning the league in their first season. In 1950, Wigan Athletic came close to election to The Football League, narrowly losing out to Scunthorpe United and Shrewsbury Town. The club would frequently apply for election to the Football League over the next 28 years before finally being accepted.

In the 1953–54 season, Wigan played an FA Cup match against Hereford United in front of a crowd of 27,526 – a club record and also a record attendance for a match between two non-League teams at a non-League ground. In the next round of the cup, Wigan Athletic was drawn against First Division side Newcastle United. Wigan Athletic held their top-flight opponents to a 2–2 draw at St James' Park, but went on to lose the replay 3–2. In 1961, the club moved back to the Cheshire League.

In the 1964–65 season, Wigan Athletic won its first Cheshire League title since returning to the league, with top goalscorer Harry Lyon scoring 66 times. He remains the club's greatest goalscorer of all time. Wigan Athletic won four cup titles in the 1966–67 season (Lancashire Floodlit Cup winner, Liverpool Non League Senior Cup winner, Northern Floodlit League winner, Northern Floodlit League Cup winner) and was also Cheshire County League runner-up.

In 1968, Wigan Athletic was a founder member of the Northern Premier League. In winning the league title in 1970–71, the leading goalscorer, with 42 goals including seven hat-tricks, was Geoff Davies, who scored 28 goals in the following 1971–72 season. The team played at Wembley Stadium for the first time in the 1973 FA Trophy final, where they lost 2–1 to Scarborough. After 34 failed election attempts, including one controversial but headline-making application in 1972 to join the Scottish League Second Division, Wigan Athletic was elected to the Football League in 1978.

=== Early League years: 1978–1995 ===
Wigan Athletic's original league kit

Wigan Athletic finished in second place in the Northern Premier League in the 1977–78 season, behind winners Boston United. But as Boston's ground and facilities did not meet the Football League criteria for a League club, whereas Springfield Park did, Wigan Athletic were put forward for election to the league. There was no automatic promotion to the Football League until 1987, and at that time a club had to be 'voted out' of the League to allow a non-League team to be promoted in their place. At the end of the 1977–78 season, Southport finished next to the bottom of the old Fourth Division, and faced near neighbours Wigan Athletic for their place in the league. The first round of voting was tied, with both clubs receiving 26 votes. After a tense re-vote which Wigan won 29–20, Southport lost their place in the Fourth Division and Wigan Athletic became an English League club on 2 June 1978.

In the club's first season of league football, Wigan Athletic finished in sixth place, just six points off promotion and playing in front of an average crowd of 6,701. Two more top-half finishes came in the following seasons, though a relatively weak 1980–81 season saw the dismissal of long-serving manager Ian McNeill shortly before the end of the season. They gained their first Football League promotion under the management of former Liverpool player Larry Lloyd in 1981–82, when a points tally of 91 saw them join the former Division Three for the first time, beginning a 10-year spell in English football's third tier. The club struggled in their first season in Division Three, which led to Lloyd's sacking in early 1983, at which point Bobby Charlton, a director at the time, took over as temporary manager before being replaced by Harry McNally. Under McNally's management, the club stabilised in Division Three and secured a pair of mid-table finishes, but a dreadful 1984–85 season cost him his job, with Tranmere manager Bryan Hamilton stepping into the breach. Under Hamilton's management, the club's performances went to the next level and they won their first silverware as a league club that season with the Freight Rover Trophy. They were beaten in the Northern final of the same competition the following season by Bolton Wanderers. More importantly, Hamilton achieved Division Three survival, which had looked an impossible task earlier that season.

Chart of yearly table positions since Wigan's election into the Football League

The 1985–86 season saw a marked improvement in the club's league form, eventually finishing in fourth position, a then-club record high which would stand for 17 years until 2002–03. Wigan Athletic finished the season just one point outside the promotion places in the final season before the Football League introduced the play-off system for promotion and relegation. However, Hamilton's feats attracted the attention of First Division Leicester City and he left to become their manager in the summer of 1986. His assistant, Ray Mathias, who had followed him from Tranmere, stepped up to the Wigan Athletic manager's job. Wigan Athletic managed an identical fourth-place finish in the 1986–87 season, but this time were rewarded with the chance to compete for the final promotion place in the new play-off system. (In the first two years of the play-off system, teams finishing third, fourth and fifth joined the team finishing 20th in the division above to play-off for the promotion place; this was changed to the teams finishing third, fourth, fifth and sixth from the 1988–89 season). The Latics lost at the two-legged semi-final stage to Swindon, who went on to win the final promotion place.

The fourth-place finishes of the 1985–86 and 1986–87 seasons proved to be the high points of Wigan Athletic's first stint in Division 3. For the next five years, they finished mid-table, flirting with relegation in 1988–89 (at which time Mathias was sacked and the previous manager Bryan Hamilton returned) and 1989–90, until they were relegated for the first time in the club's league history in 1992–93. Wigan Athletic finished in 23rd place, amid tumbling attendances which had fallen from averages of 3,000–4,000 in Wigan Athletic's Division 3 years to just 2,593 in 1992–93. Hamilton resigned shortly before the club were relegated, and was replaced by Kenny Swain. A year later, with the club back in the fourth tier of the English League, the Latics finished fourth from bottom, in 19th place. While there was no relegation that season due to the lack of a promotable club in the Football Conference, this remains the club's lowest-ever finish. The following season would prove to be arguably even worse, as Swain was sacked early in the campaign following a horrific start, and former player Graham Barrow took over as manager. Despite the club being rooted to the bottom of the table until the start of December, the second half of the campaign saw a major upturn in form, and they finished well clear of the relegation zone in 15th place. Attendances fell to a lowest-ever Wigan Athletic League average of 1,845 by 1995.

=== Rising through the league: 1995–2005 ===
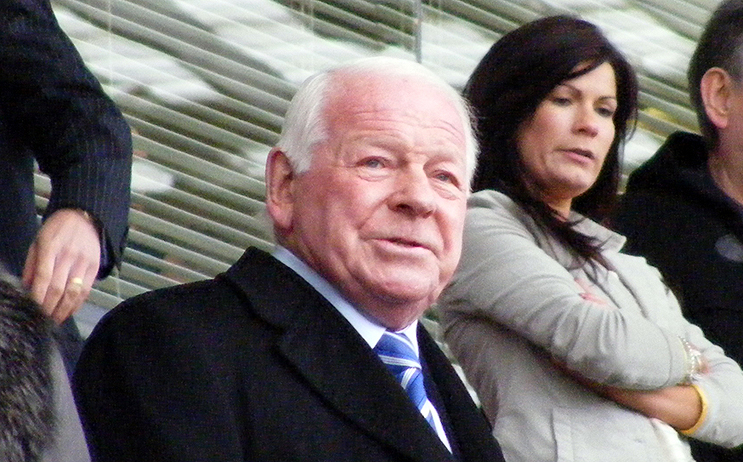
Local entrepreneur Dave Whelan acquired the club in 1995, providing funds to move into the JJB Stadium, then renamed the DW Stadium after Whelan's sports shops, DW Sports.

In February 1995, local millionaire and owner of JJB Sports, Dave Whelan purchased the club. Through Whelan's business connections in Spain he attracted three Spaniards to the club – Roberto Martínez, Isidro Díaz, and Jesus Seba – who became known as the Three Amigos. The trio became the on-pitch symbols of Whelan's ambitious plan to take Wigan Athletic into the Premier League. The Three Amigos were joined at the club by John Deehan, who replaced Barrow as manager during the 1995–96 season following a 6–2 home defeat to Mansfield Town. Deehan took the Latics within two points of a play-off place in his first season; the club had in fact been in the final automatic promotion spot with four games remaining, but lost them all and so failed to even make the playoffs. The following year Wigan Athletic became Division Three champions on the last day of the season, Graeme Jones scoring a club record 31 league goals in the process. In most seasons they would have been runners-up, but a temporary rule change which saw goals scored take precedence over goal difference allowed them to finish above runners-up Fulham, who had the same number of points and a better goal difference.

Following a mid-table finish in Division Two the following season, Deehan quit to become Steve Bruce's assistant at Sheffield United. He was succeeded by Ray Mathias, who returned for his third stint as Wigan Athletic manager. Mathias' team won the Football League Trophy in 1999, beating Millwall 1–0 at Wembley Stadium. The same season the Latics reached the Division Two play-offs, losing 2–1 on aggregate to Manchester City. Mathias was sacked, and replaced by John Benson. He led the team to the top of Division Two in his first six months, but they were only able to qualify for the play-offs. In the last Division Two play-off final played at the old Wembley Stadium, Wigan lost 3–2 after extra time to Gillingham.

Benson moved 'upstairs' to the new post of director of football in the summer of 2000, when former Arsenal manager Bruce Rioch took the manager's job for the 2000–01 season. Rioch was hampered by severe injury problems and after a difficult and often unimpressive first half of the season left the club in February 2001. He was temporarily replaced by club stalwart Colin Greenall, before the surprise appointment of Steve Bruce for the final eight games of the season. His arrival brought renewed vigour to Wigan Athletic performances, but the club ultimately lost in the play-offs again, this time against Reading, and Bruce left for Crystal Palace.

In the summer of 2001, the former Latics forward Paul Jewell took over as manager following an unsuccessful spell at Sheffield Wednesday. His first season in charge saw mixed results and an embarrassing defeat to non-League Canvey Island in the FA Cup first round, although the club eventually finished in mid-table. Jewell's second season in charge was far more successful. Wigan Athletic went on a run to the quarter-finals of the League Cup, beating Premier League opponents West Brom, Manchester City and Fulham en route. Wigan Athletic won the Division Two championship in 2002–03 with a points total of 100, powered by the goals of then-record £1.2 million signing Nathan Ellington, with a run of 10 consecutive wins along the way. The club lost only four times all season, and Wigan Athletic secured promotion to the second tier of the English Football League for the first time in their history.

After losing their first Division One game, Wigan Athletic confounded expectations to go unbeaten for the next 17 games and topped the division by November 2003. A weak finish saw the team win only three of their last 10 games to finish seventh in Division One – a last-minute goal by West Ham's Brian Deane in the final game of the season saw the Latics drop out of the play-off places in favour of eventual play-off winners Crystal Palace.

Hoping to build on the previous season's disappointing finish, the Latics went one better than 2003–04 by remaining unbeaten for the first 17 games of the 2004–05 season. Along with Sunderland and Ipswich, the Latics remained in the promotion hunt all season. By the last day of the season, Sunderland had already won the title and Wigan needed at least a draw against Reading – who themselves needed to win to finish in sixth place – to beat Ipswich to the last automatic promotion spot. A 3–1 victory at the JJB Stadium earned Wigan Athletic promotion to the top division of English football for the first time in their 73-year history.

=== Premier League years and FA Cup victory: 2005–2013 ===
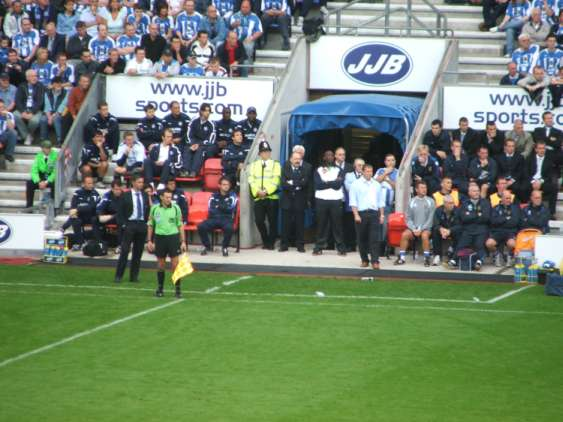
Wigan Athletic's first Premier League match against Chelsea

The club's first Premier League game was a sell-out at the JJB Stadium against holders Chelsea, a 1–0 defeat after an injury-time winner by Hernán Crespo. A successful run followed, and by November, Wigan were second in the league. Good league form was coupled with an equally strong performance in the Football League Cup, with Wigan reaching their first ever major cup final after defeating Arsenal on away goals in the semi-final. In the final, Wigan were defeated 4–0 by neighbours Manchester United. Wigan Athletic eventually finished the season in 10th place, which remains the club's highest ever league placing. Defender Pascal Chimbonda was also included in the 2005–06 PFA Team of the Season, capping off his season by being picked for the France squad for the 2006 FIFA World Cup.

During the close season, Wigan sold many players who had starred in their first season in the Premier League, such as Jimmy Bullard, Jason Roberts and Stéphane Henchoz, while bringing in replacements including Emile Heskey, Denny Landzaat, Chris Kirkland and Antonio Valencia. After a mid-table start to the 2006–07 season, Wigan had eight consecutive losses from mid-December, but was 15th in early March. On the final day of the season, Wigan got a 2–1 away win against Sheffield United, which kept them up at the expense of their opponents. The following day, Paul Jewell unexpectedly resigned as manager; his assistant Chris Hutchings was appointed as his replacement.

Wigan's third Premier League campaign saw changes in the squad, with Titus Bramble, Mario Melchiot, Jason Koumas and Marcus Bent among the players brought in, and Melchiot was installed as the new club captain. The 2007–08 season began well for Wigan, with Emile Heskey recalled to the England squad, as the first Wigan player to represent England whilst a full member of the club. However, he broke his foot immediately after his England call-up and was out injured for six weeks. The club's league position subsequently worsened, and on the back of a run of six consecutive defeats, Wigan fell into the relegation zone. Whelan took the decision to sack Hutchings on 5 November 2007, after 12 games in charge, reinstating Steve Bruce, who saved the club from relegation.

In the summer of 2008, Bruce signed Lee Cattermole from Middlesbrough for £3.5 million, and Egyptian striker Amr Zaki sign on an initial one-year loan. Zaki had scored 10 Premier League goals by February 2009, as Wigan reached seventh place in the table with 34 points from 25 games. January saw the departure of two key first team members, Wilson Palacios and Emile Heskey, to Tottenham and Aston Villa respectively. Despite these changes, Wigan finished the season in 11th place with 45 points, their second-best finish ever in the Premier League. On 3 June, Bruce left Wigan for the second time to take over the vacant manager position at Sunderland. July saw the departure of another key first team member Antonio Valencia to Manchester United. Before the 2009–10 season got underway, Cattermole left for Sunderland.

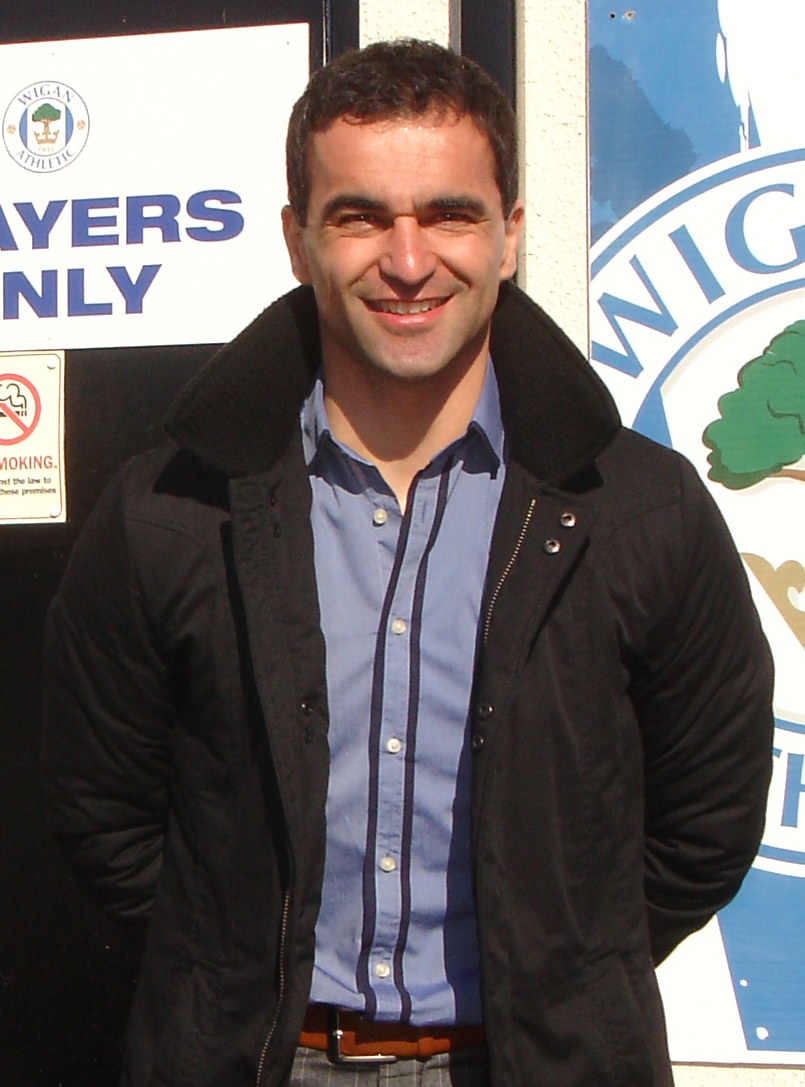
Former Wigan player Roberto Martínez managed the club to victory in the 2013 FA Cup final, their first major honour.

Wigan appointed Roberto Martínez, then manager of Swansea City, as manager prior to the 2009–10 Premier League season. He previously played for Wigan from 1995 to 2001. On 26 September, they claimed their first three points against a "Big 4" team after beating Chelsea 3–1, with goals from Titus Bramble, Hugo Rodallega and Paul Scharner. A late surge that included a 1–0 win over Liverpool and a 3–2 win over Arsenal – the latter of which saw Wigan recover from two goals down with ten minutes remaining to win in injury time – saw the team once more survive relegation. Most notably, having never defeated any of the traditional "Big Four" in the league until their win over Chelsea (and with only one win over any of them in cup competitions), Wigan ended the season having defeated three of them at home. Despite this high, the season also saw two humiliating 8 goal defeats, firstly a 9–1 thrashing at Tottenham in November, and finally an 8–0 defeat to Chelsea on the final day of the season, a match which saw their opponents crowned Premier League champions.

In the 2010–11 season, Wigan fell to the bottom of the league by the end of February, following a 4–0 defeat to Manchester United. However, despite remaining in the bottom three for the majority of the season, they managed to retain their Premier League status on the last day of the season, defeating Stoke City at the Britannia Stadium after a goal from Hugo Rodallega. On 7 May 2012, they simultaneously secured their Premier League status and relegated Blackburn Rovers with a 1–0 victory at Ewood Park.

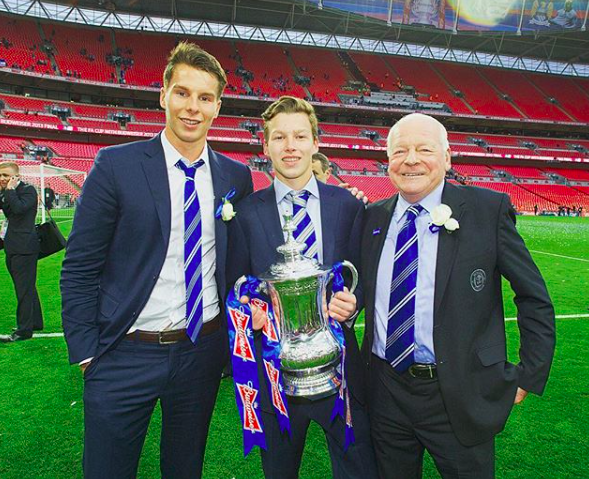
Members of the Wigan Athletic board holding the FA Cup trophy following the club's victory at the 2013 final

In 2013, after beating Everton in the quarter-final and Millwall in the semi-final, Wigan reached the FA Cup final for the first time in their history. In the final, played at Wembley Stadium, Wigan beat Manchester City 1–0, with a goal by Ben Watson scored in injury time. Wigan's first ever major trophy also gave the club a place in the group stage of the Europa League. Following their 4–1 defeat to Arsenal three days later, Wigan Athletic ended their eight-year spell in the Premier League and became the first team to be relegated and win the FA Cup in the same season. On 5 June it was announced that Martínez had left Wigan and had signed for Everton on a four-year deal.

=== End of the Whelan era: 2013–2018 ===
Owen Coyle became the new manager of Wigan Athletic when Martínez left for Everton. The team lost to Manchester United in the Community Shield. Coyle left by mutual agreement on 2 December 2013 after a poor start to the season, and was replaced by Uwe Rösler. On 12 December in his first match, Wigan were eliminated from the Europa League group stage after defeat to Maribor. On 9 March 2014 Wigan beat Manchester City to reach the semi-final of the FA Cup at Wembley for the second successive year, where they played Arsenal, and lost 4–2 on penalties after normal time and extra time resulted in a 1–1 draw. After finishing 5th in the Championship, Wigan lost their play-off semi-final to Queens Park Rangers.

Rösler was sacked in November 2014 with the club in the relegation places, and was replaced by Malky Mackay. Whelan resigned as chairman on 3 March 2015, remaining as owner but handing over the chairmanship to his grandson David Sharpe. The following month, with Wigan in danger of relegation to League One, Mackay was sacked and replaced by former Wigan captain Gary Caldwell, yet the team ended the season with relegation. The squad changed drastically, including the signings of Will Grigg from Brentford and Reece James from Manchester United. The side lost only once in 23 matches in the second half of the season and won the division, with Grigg the league's top scorer with 25 goals.

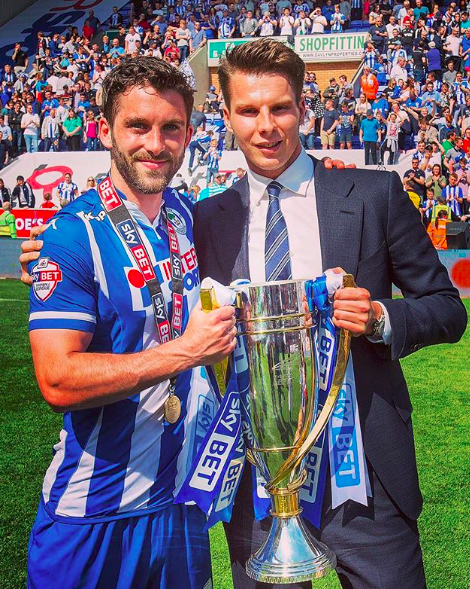
Will Grigg (left) and club chairman David Sharpe celebrating Wigan's promotion from League One to the Championship in 2016

In October 2016, following a poor start to the season, Caldwell was sacked as manager and replaced by Manchester United coach Warren Joyce. Results did not improve under Joyce, who was sacked in March 2017. Wigan were subsequently relegated back to League One in April and interim manager Graham Barrow left, ending a 15-year association with the club. Paul Cook, who had just won League Two with Portsmouth, was appointed Wigan manager in June 2017.

In the 2017–18 League One season, Wigan finished top winning promotion back to the Championship. Their promotion was sealed by a 4–0 win against Fleetwood Town. In the 2017–18 FA Cup, Wigan beat Manchester City in the fifth round at home, winning 1–0 after Will Grigg scored in the 79th minute. In the quarter-finals, they were knocked out by Southampton in a 2–0 loss. At the end of the season it was announced that the Whelan family had agreed a deal to sell the club, stadium and training facilities to the Hong Kong–based International Entertainment Corporation (IEC) in a £22m deal. On 2 November 2018, IEC received shareholder approval to complete the acquisition of the football club, ending 23 years of Whelan family ownership.

In the 2018–19 season, Wigan finished 18th in the Championship with 52 points, well clear of the relegation zone.

=== Administration, financial instability, and new ownership: Since 2020 ===
On 4 June 2020, IEC sold the majority of Wigan Athletic shareholdings to Hong Kong–based Next Leader Fund; the sale was formally ratified and approved by the shareholders of IEC, the Hong Kong Stock Exchange and the EFL. On 1 July 2020, the club – standing 14th in the Championship, eight points clear of relegation, in a season delayed due to the COVID-19 pandemic – announced it had gone into administration as Next Leader Fund had refused to invest promised money. The insolvency left Wigan facing a 12-point deduction; the sanction would be applied at the end of the 2019–20 season if the club finished outside the bottom three after 46 games. Wigan MP Lisa Nandy and Greater Manchester mayor Andy Burnham wrote a joint letter to Parry calling for an investigation into the club's takeover. Players had not been paid and there was talk of club staff being made redundant and of players being offered for sale, they said. Wigan's supporters club also called for an investigation and for financial support from the EFL; supporters, backed by Nandy, later launched an online petition to try to trigger a parliamentary debate around the EFL's owners' and directors' test.

On 7 July, 75 (approximately half) of the club's non-playing staff were made redundant by the administrators.

Meanwhile, on 7 July 2020 the club had appealed against the 12-point deduction imposed by the EFL for entering administration. On 14 July, Wigan recorded their biggest League victory, beating Hull City 8–0. This, combined with other results, meant Wigan would not finish in the relegation places, so the 12-point deduction would be applied at the end of the current season with the relegation confirmed on 4 August.

On 17 August 2020, it was reported that Au Yeung Wai Kay, the club's owner, had, on 23 June, asked Begbies Traynor about putting it into administration before completing his takeover. Wigan supporters began a fund-raising effort, initially raising £500,000 to help secure the club's future, and then raising £200,000 more.

Administrators had been confident a sale would be agreed by their deadline, but later revised their opinion.

By early March 2021, the administrators were in advanced talks with a consortium, Phoenix 2021 Ltd, led by Bahrain businessmen Abdulrahman Al-Jasmi and Talal Mubarak al-Hammad, which was confirmed officially on 30 March. In May, the former administrators repaid £171,000 raised by supporters to keep the club going when it first went into administration.

The club finished the 2020–21 season in 20th position, one point above the relegation places. Wigan Athletic won the League One title under Leam Richardson in the following season, earning promotion back to the Championship after a final day 3–0 victory at Shrewsbury Town.

On 7 March 2023, Wigan reported a £7.7m loss for the financial year to June 2022. Four days later, Wigan released a statement saying there would be a temporary delay in meeting wage obligations due to liquidity issues; the EFL was aware of the situation and on 20 March 2023, bottom-of-the-table Wigan were docked three points for failing to pay players, having had a previous EFL sanction for non-payment suspended. At the end of the 2022–23 season, they were relegated from the Championship.

In late May 2023, Wigan were hit with two further points deductions and would therefore start its next season with minus eight points. On 12 June, HMRC lodged a winding-up petition over unpaid tax. On 14 June 2023, Wigan-born billionaire and Wigan Warriors RLFC co-owner Mike Danson bought the club and immediately paid all creditors, including staff.

== Stadium ==
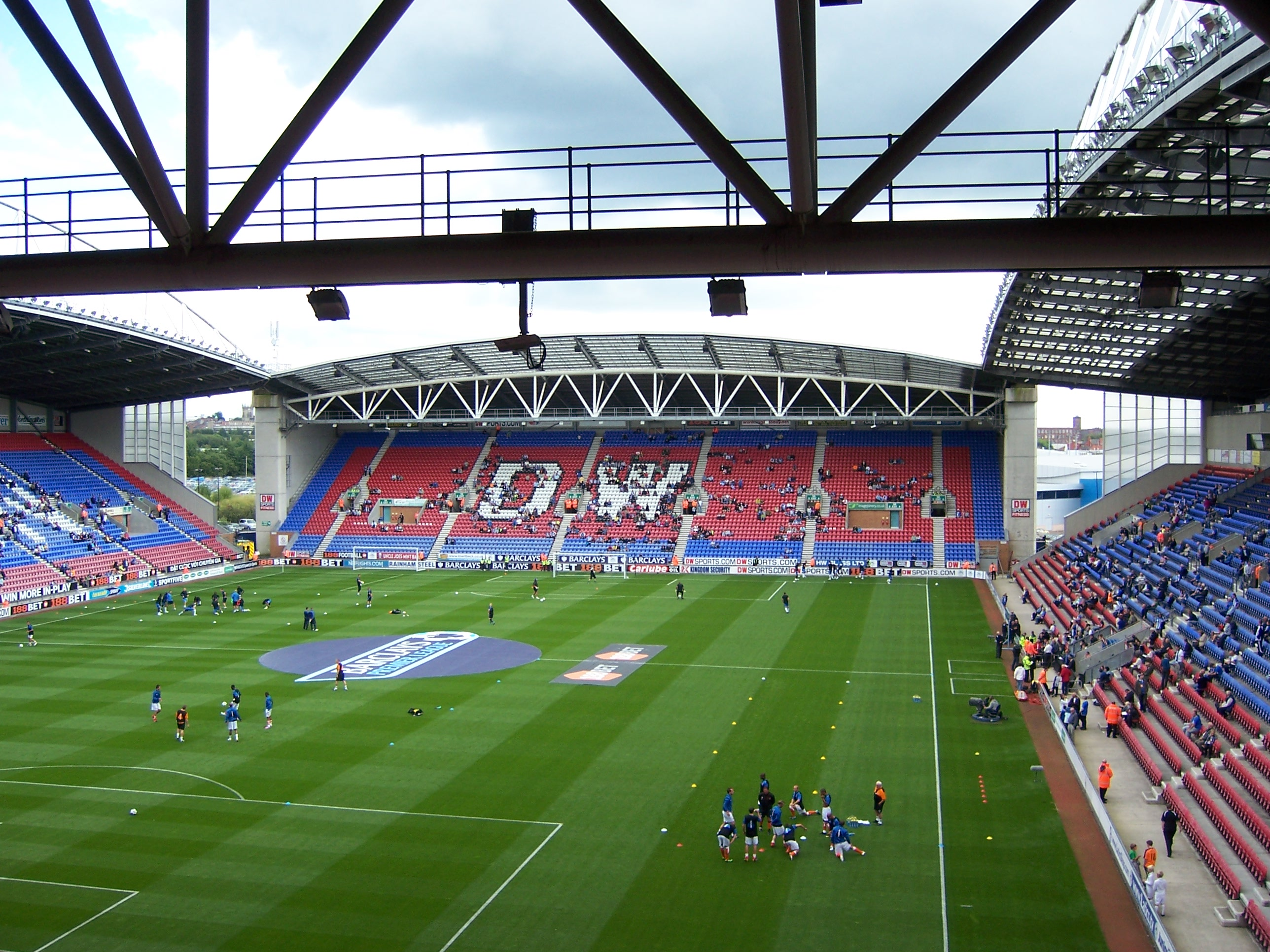
Warm-up at the DW Stadium.

Wigan Athletic's stadium is the 25,138 capacity The Brick Community Stadium, part of the Robin Park complex in Wigan. It has been the club's home since the 1999–2000 season. Wigan Athletic owns the stadium, but leases the ground to rugby league team Wigan Warriors. The stadium cost £30 million to construct. Previously, home games were played at Springfield Park, the former home of Wigan Borough, which was demolished in June 1999; it is now the site of a housing development. The record attendance at The Brick Community Stadium (then known as the JJB Stadium) for Wigan Athletic is 25,133 for a game against Manchester United on 11 May 2008 – the final match of the 2007–08 season.

The stadium, initially known as the JJB Stadium for sponsorship reasons, was the fourth attempt at re-development/re-location for Wigan Athletic, the first coming in 1986 when then-chairman Bill Kenyon revealed plans for a 15,000 all-seater development at Springfield Park including a hotel and shopping facilities. The club was to play at the nearby Woodhouse Stadium (formerly Wigan Municipal Stadium – now demolished) while the building work took place. In 1990, Kenyon submitted his second scheme which would cost £3m, hold 12–15,000 fans and involved moving the pitch nearer to the car park. Neither efforts got past the planning stage. The next chairman, Stephen Gage, spent most of 1993 and 1994 trying to relocate the Latics to the then Robin Park Stadium (now demolished) until his plans were scuppered by Wigan Council when the local council announced plans for their own ground involving Wigan Warriors. Gage finally admitted defeat when he sold the Latics to Dave Whelan on 27 February 1995 for around £1m.

Plans for the JJB Stadium were first published in 1997. Contracts for the new stadium were signed in late 1997 and work began immediately. Originally the ground was to be built for both Wigan Athletic and Orrell R.U.F.C., as grants were only available for multi-use stadia at that time. Wigan Warriors did not figure in the equation until Whelan bought the rugby league club some 12 months later after protracted negotiations with the directors of the rugby league club. The modern all-seater stadium was officially opened on 4 August 1999. Its inauguration was marked with a friendly between Wigan and neighbours Manchester United, who were then reigning European Champions, with Alex Ferguson officially opening the stadium. However, Wigan Athletic hosted Morecambe three days earlier on 1 August as a dress rehearsal for the official opening against Manchester United. The game was played during a violent electrical storm and torrential rain, even so, 4,020 supporters attended and the game ended in a goalless draw. The first competitive football match took place on 7 August 1999, with Wigan Athletic facing Scunthorpe United in a Division 2 match. Simon Haworth scored twice, including the first competitive goal at the new stadium, as Athletic won 3–0.

On 7 March 2005 Greater Manchester Police announced that it would stop policing Wigan Athletic matches at the stadium from 2 April. This move left Wigan Athletic facing the prospect of playing their home games in the Premier League in an empty stadium, so they paid the money they owed to the police. The club appealed against the payments in court and won, with the claims expected to earn the club around £37,000.

On 25 March 2009 it was announced that Wigan Athletic would change the name of their stadium to The DW Stadium, after chairman Dave Whelan's commercial venture, DW Sports Fitness. For 2013–14 Europa League fixtures held at the stadium, the ground was known as The Wigan Athletic Stadium. From 13 May 2024, the stadium was renamed The Brick Community Stadium, in partnership with a local Wigan charity, The Brick, which works to address poverty and homelessness. The name will remain in place until the end of 2025 while Wigan Athletic and Wigan Warriors secure a long-term commercial stadium partner for 2026 and beyond.

== Supporters ==
Wigan Athletic Official Supporters Club (formerly known as Wigan Athletic Supporters Travel Club) is the official supporters' association of Wigan Athletic Football Club. The supporters club are a non-profit organisation run by volunteers and meet before home matches in the South Stand Bar.

The Latics' most vocal supporters can be found in the East Stand of The Brick Community Stadium which houses up to 8,206 fans The South Stand of the ground is the family stand.

A long-standing song sung by fans of the club is "You Are My Sunshine". In more recent times, "I'm a Believer", the Hokey cokey, "We Built This City" and "Gold" are among some of the songs that have been adapted by Wigan supporters.

The club has one unofficial fanzine, The Mudhutter, which is released between 5 and 6 times during the season.

Resulting from a number of incidents at Latics matches where smoke bombs were used by fans (resulting in 17 banning orders as a result of one fixture), several club statements were issued and police presence was increased at some matches. Data from the UK Football Policing Unit found that Wigan Athletic along with Everton and Manchester United had the highest number of incidents involving pyrotechnics.

Wigan's return to the Championship saw an average away following of over 1,200. This figure did not include Europa League, Community Shield, League Cup and FA Cup fixtures, where on average supporters turned up in greater numbers.

In 2013, the club sold out their 25,000 allocation for the FA Cup final and sold 20,000 tickets for the FA Cup semi-final. A total of 5,500 was also sold for the FA Community Shield in the same year.

In 2014, hundreds of fans took part in a charity walk from Wigan to Bolton in aid of local charity Joseph's Goal. Joseph was Wigan's mascot in the 2013 FA Cup final, led out by captain Emmerson Boyce.

On Boxing Day, over the years many fans have chosen to attend Wigan Athletic's match in fancy dress. This is particularly prominent with away fixtures on that day where the fans are known as the 'Banana Army'. However, on Boxing Day in 2014 a boycott of the club's fixture against Leeds United was ordered by some supporters due to the ticket prices for the match at Elland Road. Around 750 away fans attended the match.

During the 2014–15 season, a Fan Advisory Board (FAB) was set up by the club to allow supporters of Wigan Athletic to have a greater say on any issues they may have. The board meets every month to six weeks with the first meeting having taken place in November 2014.

=== Mascot ===
In August 2019, the club announced that a giant pie, called Crusty, would serve as the team's new mascot for the 2019–20 season. Crusty The Pie was chosen following a competition in which more than 90 primary schools were invited to submit ideas, with over half of the entries opting for a pie.

== Rivalries ==
Since Wigan Athletic's admission to the Football League in 1978, the club has built up several rivalries, mainly with Bolton Wanderers, the club's primary derby match.

Wigan also have other local rivalries with Preston North End, Blackburn Rovers, Oldham Athletic, Blackpool and Rochdale.

One of the club's longest and recently forgotten rivalries was with nearby Lancashire based club Chorley, although the two clubs have not played a league game since 1971 when they were in the Northern Premier League. The last time Wigan played Chorley was in the first round of the FA Cup in 2020, with non-League Chorley beating an administration-stricken Wigan 3–2 after extra-time.

== European record ==
Wigan's victory in the 2013 FA Cup final qualified them for European football for the first and only time, earning them an automatic place in the group stage of the 2013–14 UEFA Europa League.

Season	Competition	Round	Opponents	Home	Away	Group position
2013–14	UEFA Europa League	Group stage	(Slovenia) Maribor	3–1	1–2	4th
2013–14	UEFA Europa League	Group stage	(Russia) Rubin Kazan	1–1	0–1	4th
2013–14	UEFA Europa League	Group stage	(Belgium) Zulte Waregem	1–2	0–0	4th

== Players ==
=== First team ===
As of 20 August 2026

Note: Flags indicate national team as defined under FIFA eligibility rules; some limited exceptions apply. Players may hold more than one non-FIFA nationality.

No.	Pos.	Nation	Player
1	GK	ENG	Joe Walsh (on loan from Queens Park Rangers)
2	DF	ENG	Connor Barrett
3	DF	WAL	Morgan Fox
4	DF	SCO	Jeremiah Chilokoa-Mullen
5	DF	ENG	Finley Burns
6	MF	SCO	Jensen Weir
7	MF	SCO	Fraser Murray
8	MF	ENG	Max Power (captain)
9	FW	ENG	Sonny Perkins
10	MF	ENG	Reggie Walsh (on loan from Chelsea)
11	FW	IRL	Dara Costelloe
12	GK	ENG	Tom Watson
13	MF	WAL	Luke Harris (on loan from Fulham)
14	MF	ENG	Ryan Trevitt
15	DF	ENG	Llyton Chapman
16	DF	WAL	Archie Harris

No.	Pos.	Nation	Player
17	MF	ENG	Akeel Higgins
18	MF	ENG	Charlie Gray (on loan from Manchester City)
19	MF	ENG	Chris Sze
20	MF	ENG	Callum McManaman
21	DF	ENG	K'Marni Miller
22	DF	ENG	Jon Mellish
23	DF	MLT	James Carragher
24	FW	ENG	Adam Moseley
25	FW	IRL	Scott Hogan
26	MF	ENG	Joe Adams
27	MF	ENG	Bradley Burrowes (on loan from Aston Villa)
28	MF	ENG	Charley McKee
30	GK	ENG	Matteo Spinelli
38	FW	ENG	Christian Saydee
41	GK	ENG	Joe Whitworth

=== U21 ===
As of 8 August 2026

Note: Flags indicate national team as defined under FIFA eligibility rules; some limited exceptions apply. Players may hold more than one non-FIFA nationality.

No.	Pos.	Nation	Player
49	DF	ENG	Seb Spelman
51	MF	ENG	Harrison Rimmer
53	DF	ENG	Sam Bolland

No.	Pos.	Nation	Player
55	FW	ENG	Reece Greenhalgh
56	MF	ENG	John-Paul Cavanagh
57	FW	ENG	Cole Simms

=== Out on loan ===
As of 8 August 2026

Note: Flags indicate national team as defined under FIFA eligibility rules; some limited exceptions apply. Players may hold more than one non-FIFA nationality.

No.	Pos.	Nation	Player
—	MF	ENG	Kai Payne (at Oldham Athletic until 30 June 2027)
—	FW	ENG	Maleace Asamoah (at Port Vale until 30 June 2027)

No.	Pos.	Nation	Player
—	FW	ENG	Joseph Hungbo (at Swindon Town until 30 June 2027)

== Club officials ==
Board

As of 7 August 2026

- Owner: Mike Danson
- Chairman & Senior Non-Executive Director: Ben Goodburn
- Director: Lucas Danson
- Chief Executive Officer: Anthony Cole-Johnson
- Non-Executive Chair & Honorary President: Brenda Spencer
- Managing Director of the Stadium: Neil Russell
- Life President: Dave Whelan
- Senior Advisor: Graham Barrow

Coaching & Medical Staff

As of 10 July 2026

- Head Coach: Gary Caldwell
- Assistant Head Coach: Peter Atherton
- First Team Coach: David Perkins
- First Team Coach: John Welsh
- Goalkeeping Coach: Matt Gilks
- Head of Recruitment: Joe Riley
- Lead Analyst: Lauren Jones
- First Team Analyst: Sam Riordan
- Head of Medical: Joe Maden-Wilkinson
- Physiotherapist: Michael McBride
- Sports Science: Jack Craigie
- Kitman: Naz Ali
- Academy Manager: Jake Campbell
- Lead PDP Coach: Frankie Bunn
- Under 21s Manager: Chris Brown
- Under 18s Manager: Mark Maddock

== Managers ==
As listed on the official Wigan Athletic website.

Period	Manager
1932–37	(England) Charlie Spencer
1946–47	(Scotland) Jimmy Milne
1949–52	(Scotland) Bob Pryde
1952–54	(England) Ted Goodier
1954–55	(England) Walter Crook
1955–56	(England) Ron Suart
1956	(Northern Ireland) Billy Cook
1957	(England) Sam Barkas
1957–58	(England) Trevor Hitchen
1958–59	(England) Malcolm Barrass

Period	Manager
1959	Jimmy Shirley
1959–60	Pat Murphy
1960	(England) Allenby Chilton
1961–63	(England) Johnny Ball
1963–66	(Scotland) Allan Brown
1966–67	Alf Craig
1967–68	(England) Harry Leyland
1968	Alan Saunders
1968–70	(Scotland) Ian McNeill
1970–72	(England) Gordon Milne

Period	Manager
1972–74	(England) Les Rigby
1974–76	(England) Brian Tiler
1976–81	(Scotland) Ian McNeill
1981–83	(England) Larry Lloyd
1983–85	(England) Harry McNally
1985–86	(Northern Ireland) Bryan Hamilton
1986–89	(England) Ray Mathias
1989–93	(Northern Ireland) Bryan Hamilton
1993	(England) Dave Philpotts
1993–94	(England) Kenny Swain

Period	Manager
1994–95	(England) Graham Barrow
1995–98	(England) John Deehan
1998–99	(England) Ray Mathias
1999–2000	(Scotland) John Benson
2000–01	(Scotland) Bruce Rioch
2001	(England) Steve Bruce
2001–07	(England) Paul Jewell
2007	(England) Chris Hutchings
2007–09	(England) Steve Bruce
2009–13	(Spain) Roberto Martínez

Period	Manager
2013	(Republic of Ireland) Owen Coyle
2013–14	(Germany) Uwe Rösler
2014–15	(Scotland) Malky Mackay
2015–16	(Scotland) Gary Caldwell
2016–17	(England) Warren Joyce
2017–20	(England) Paul Cook
2020	(Republic of Ireland) John Sheridan
2020–22	(England) Leam Richardson
2022–23	(Ivory Coast) Kolo Touré
2023–25	(Scotland) Shaun Maloney
2025–26	(England) Ryan Lowe
2026-Present	(Scotland) Gary Caldwell

== Records ==
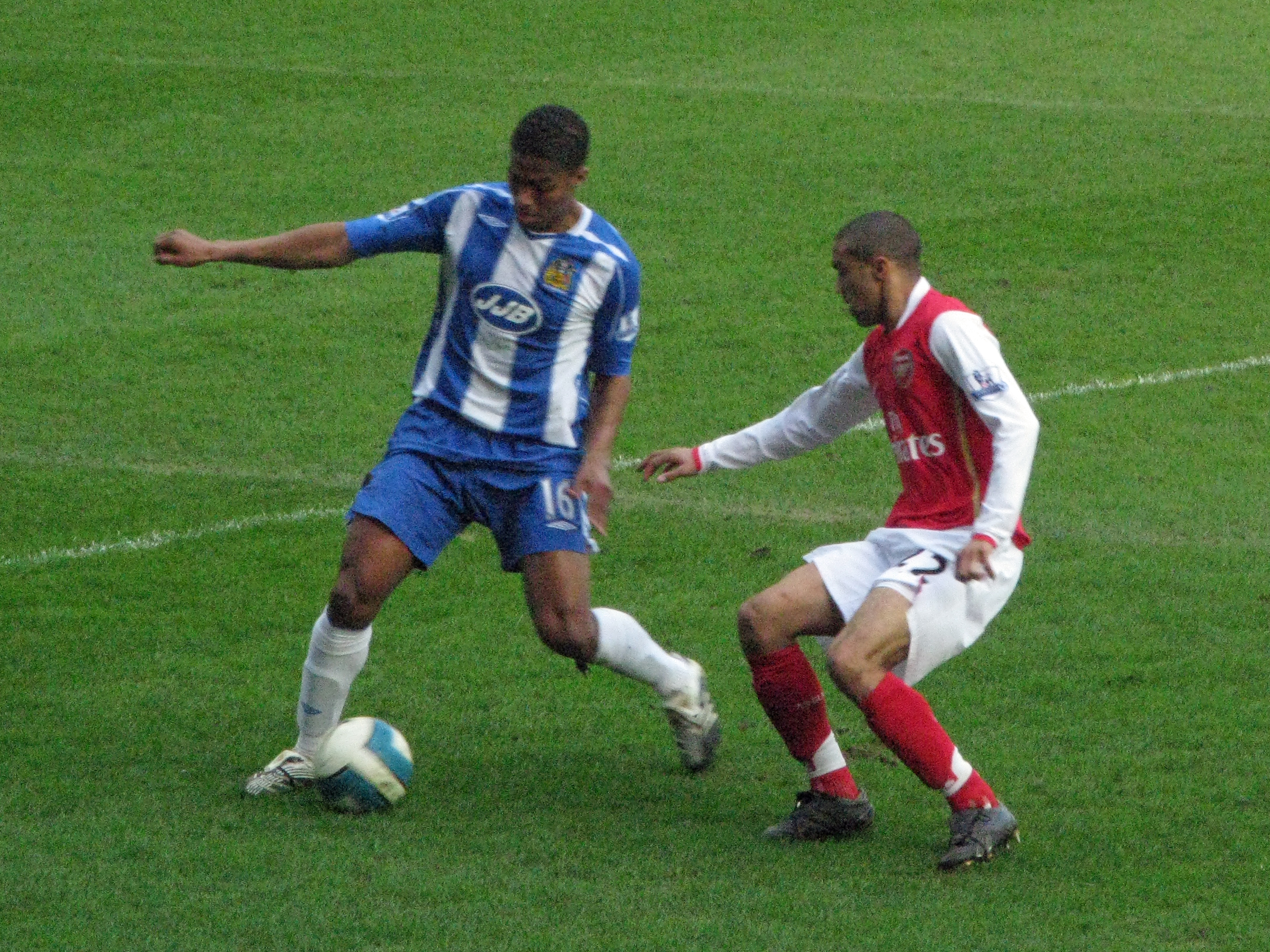
Antonio Valencia's £15 million sale to Manchester United in 2009 is the largest transfer involving Wigan Athletic.

- Highest league position: 10th in the Premier League (2005–06)
- Record League victory: 8–0 vs Hull City (Championship, 14 July 2020)
- Record attendance at The Brick Community Stadium: 25,133 v Manchester United, Premier League (11 May 2008)
- Record Attendance Springfield Park (Wigan): 27,526, vs Hereford United F.C., FA Cup (1953)
- Most League appearances: 317, Kevin Langley (1981–1986, 1990–1994)
- Most League goals scored: total, 70, Andy Liddell (1998–2003)
- Most League goals scored, season: 31, Graeme Jones (1996–97)
- Record consecutive league appearances: 139, Sam Tickle (May 2023 – May 2026)
- Record transfer fee paid: Charles N'Zogbia, £7 million, from Newcastle United, February 2009
- Record transfer fee received: Antonio Valencia, £15 million, to Manchester United, June 2009

== Honours ==
League

- Championship (level 2)
  - Runners-up: 2004–05
- Second Division / League One (level 3)
  - Champions: 2002–03, 2015–16, 2017–18, 2021–22
- Fourth Division / Third Division (level 4)
  - Champions: 1996–97
  - Promoted: 1981–82
- Northern Premier League (level 5)
  - Champions: 1970–71, 1974–75
- Lancashire Combination
  - Champions: 1947–48, 1950–51, 1952–53, 1953–54
- Northern Floodlit League
  - Champions: 1966–67
- Cheshire League
  - Champions: 1933–34, 1934–35, 1935–36, 1964–65

Cup

- FA Cup
  - Winners: 2012–13
- League Cup
  - Runners-up: 2005–06
- FA Community Shield
  - Runners-up: 2013
- Associate Members' Cup / Football League Trophy
  - Winners: 1984–85, 1998–99
- FA Trophy
  - Runners-up: 1972–73
- Northern Premier League Shield
  - Winners: 1972–73, 1973–74, 1975–76
- Northern Premier League Challenge Cup
  - Winners: 1971–72
