= 2022–23 Wigan Athletic F.C. season =

Wigan Athletic
2022–23 season
- Owner: Phoenix 2021 Limited
- Chairman: Talal Al Hammad
- Manager: Leam Richardson (until 10 November 2022); Rob Kelly (interim); Kolo Touré (from 29 November 2022 till 26 January 2023); Shaun Maloney (from 28 January 2023)
- Stadium: DW Stadium
- Championship: 24th (relegated)
- FA Cup: Third round
- EFL Cup: First round
- Top goalscorer: League: Will Keane (12); All: Will Keane (12)
- Highest home attendance: 17,788
- Lowest home attendance: 5,668
- Average home league attendance: 11,939
- Biggest win: Rotherham United 0–2 Wigan (1 October 2022)
- Biggest defeat: Wigan 1–5 Burnley (27 August 2022)
Home colours	Away colours

The 2022–23 season is the 91st season in the existence of Wigan Athletic Football Club and the club's first season back in the Championship since the 2019–20 season following promotion last season. In addition to the league, they will also compete in the 2022–23 FA Cup and the 2022–23 EFL Cup.

On 11 March 2023, Wigan released a statement explaining that there was a delay in meeting wage obligations, due to liquidity issues and that the EFL are aware of the situation.

On 20 March 2023, Wigan were deducted three points by the EFL, having previously been given a suspended penalty for a similar issue. They were also charged, and sanctioned for failing to meet terms of contracts in June, July and October 2022. On 19 May, the EFL deducted three points from the club's 2022–23 season total; Wigan therefore finished the season on 39 points, 10 points from safety.

On 29 April 2023, Wigan were relegated back to League One after a 1–1 draw with Reading.

== Transfers ==
=== In ===
Date	Pos	Player	Transferred from	Fee	Ref
1 July 2022 (Note: The transfer was announced on 25 June, and would become official on 1 July, once his Blackburn Rovers contract expired)	LW	(England) Luke Brennan	(England) Blackburn Rovers	Free Transfer	
1 July 2022	CF	(England) Youssef Chentouf	(England) Rising Ballers Kensington	Free Transfer	
1 July 2022 (Note: The transfer was announced on 25 June, and would become official on 1 July, once his Guiseley contract expired)	CF	(England) Josh Stones	(England) Guiseley	Free Transfer	
20 July 2022	RB	(Namibia) Ryan Nyambe	(England) Blackburn Rovers	Free Transfer	
29 July 2022	DM	(United States) Ethan Mitchell	(England) Plymouth Argyle	Free Transfer	
29 July 2022	CF	(England) Joe Rodwell-Grant	(England) Preston North End	Free Transfer	
29 July 2022	CM	(England) Abdi Sharif	(England) Liverpool	Free Transfer	
29 July 2022	GK	(England) Matt Wonnacott	(England) Torquay United	Free transfer	
16 August 2022	LB	(England) Dylan Dwyer	(England) Tranmere Rovers	Free Transfer	
24 August 2022	RB	(England) Joe Winstanley	(England) Brighton & Hove Albion	Free Transfer	
1 September 2022	RW	(Republic of Ireland) Anthony Scully	(England) Lincoln City	Undisclosed	
10 January 2023	CB	(Sierra Leone) Steven Caulker	(Turkey) Fatih Karagümrük	Free Transfer	

=== Out ===
Date	Pos	Player	Transferred to	Fee	Ref
30 June 2022	CF	(Democratic Republic of the Congo) Divin Baningime	Unattached	Released	
30 June 2022	RW	(England) Adam Brooks	Unattached	Released	
30 June 2022	GK	(England) Sam Campbell	Unattached	Released	
30 June 2022	CF	(England) Tom Costello	(England) Coventry City	Released	
30 June 2022	AM	(England) Arthur Lomax	(England) Tranmere Rovers	Released	
30 June 2022	RW	(England) Gavin Massey	(England) Port Vale	Released	
30 June 2022	CM	(England) Harry McGee	(England) F.C. United	Released	
30 June 2022	DF	(England) Sam Owens	Unattached	Released	
30 June 2022	MF	(England) Dean Pinnington	Unattached	Released	
30 June 2022	LB	(Slovakia) Dan Smith	Unattached	Released	
30 June 2022	CB	(Republic of Ireland) Timi Sobowale	(Republic of Ireland) Waterford	Released	
30 June 2022	CF	(England) Levi Welsh	Unattached	Released	
17 July 2022	CB	(England) Adam Long	(England) Doncaster Rovers	Undisclosed	

=== Loans in ===
Date	Pos	Player	Loaned from	On loan until	Ref
9 August 2022	CF	(Wales) Nathan Broadhead	(England) Everton	6 January 2023 (Note: On 6 January, Broadhead was recalled to Everton)	
12 August 2022	CF	(England) Ashley Fletcher	(England) Watford	End of Season	
1 September 2022	CB	(England) Rarmani Edmonds-Green	(England) Huddersfield Town	11 January 2023 (Note: On 11 January, Edmonds-Green was recalled to Huddersfield)	
10 January 2023	CM	(England) Miguel Azeez	(England) Arsenal	End of Season	
13 January 2023	DM	(Ivory Coast) Christ Tiéhi	(Czech Republic) Slovan Liberec	End of Season	
30 January 2023	RB	(England) Martin Kelly	(England) West Bromwich Albion	End of Season	
31 January 2023	CB	(Tunisia) Omar Rekik	(England) Arsenal	End of Season	
31 January 2023	AM	(Luxembourg) Danel Sinani	(England) Norwich City	End of Season	

=== Loans out ===
Date	Pos	Player	Loaned to	On loan until	Ref
19 July 2022	LW	(Northern Ireland) Jordan Jones	(Scotland) Kilmarnock	6 February 2023 (Note: Jones was recalled by Wigan on 6 February)	
21 July 2022	LB	(Scotland) Luke Robinson	(England) Tranmere Rovers	End of Season	
27 July 2022	GK	(England) Sam Tickle	(England) Warrington Rylands 1906	1 January 2023	
3 August 2022	AM	(Republic of Ireland) Jamie McGrath	(Scotland) Dundee United	End of Season	
1 September 2022	CF	(England) Stephen Humphrys	(Scotland) Heart of Midlothian	End of Season	
8 September 2022	MF	(England) Harry McHugh	(England) Chester	1 October 2022	
13 September 2022	CF	(England) Joe Rodwell-Grant	(England) FC United of Manchester	13 October 2022	
16 September 2022	CB	(England) James Carragher	(England) Oldham Athletic	1 January 2023	
24 September 2022	CM	(Wales) Scott Smith	(England) Torquay United	2 December 2022 (Note: On 2 December, Smith returned from his Torquay loan early.)	
25 November 2022	CM	(England) Abdi Sharif	(England) AFC Telford United	1 January 2023	
13 December 2022	RB	(England) Kieran Lloyd	(England) Chorley	1 January 2023	
16 December 2022	CM	(England) Joe Adams	(England) AFC Totton	1 January 2023	
16 December 2022	CB	(United States) Ethan Mitchell	(England) Ashton United	1 January 2023	
5 January 2023	DM	(Scotland) Graeme Shinnie	(Scotland) Aberdeen	End of Season	
24 January 2023	CF	(England) Josh Stones	(Scotland) Ross County	End of Season	
2 February 2023	RW	(Wales) Gwion Edwards	(Scotland) Ross County	End of Season	
2 March 2023	MF	(England) Kai Payne	(England) Mossley	30 March 2023	

== Pre-season and friendlies ==
On 10 June the Latics announced their initial pre-season schedule, which included a training camp in Spain. Two home friendlies, against Liverpool XI and Sheffield Wednesday was also added to the schedule. On 9 July, Wigan played an unannounced friendly against their main rivals Bolton Wanderers.

Win Draw Loss Fixtures

5 July 2022 Friendly	Bamber Bridge	1–5	Wigan Athletic	Bamber Bridge
19:30 BST	Trialist 83'	Report	Lang 9', 24'; Pearce 10'; Magennis 61'; Smith 74'	Stadium: Sir Tom Finney Stadium

9 July 2022 Friendly	Bolton Wanderers	0–1	Wigan Athletic	Bolton
12:00 BST		Report	Wyke 33' (pen.)	Stadium: Lostock Training Ground; Attendance: Behind closed doors

12 July 2022 Friendly	Wigan Athletic	6–0	Liverpool XI	Wigan
19:00 BST	Lang 33'; Darikwa (?); Pearce 48'; Carragher 51'; Humphrys 55'; Whatmough 69'	Report		Stadium: DW Stadium

16 July 2022 Friendly	Oldham Athletic	1–3	Wigan Athletic	Oldham
13:00 BST	Hope 22'	Report	McClean 64'; Lang 72'; Tilt 78'	Stadium: Boundary Park

19 July 2022 Friendly	Accrington Stanley	0–0	Wigan Athletic	Accrington
19:00 BST		Report		Stadium: Wham Stadium

23 July 2022 Friendly	Wigan Athletic	4–1	Sheffield Wednesday	Wigan
15:00 BST	McClean 21'; Naylor 50'; Magennis 80'; Aasgaard 89'	Report	Heneghan 4'	Stadium: DW Stadium

== Competitions ==
=== Overall record ===
Competition	First match	Last match	Starting round	Final position	Record							
Competition	First match	Last match	Starting round	Final position	Pld	W	D	L	GF	GA	GD	Win %
Championship	30 July 2022	8 May 2023	Matchday 1	24th	46	10	15	21	38	65	−27	21.74
FA Cup	7 January 2023	17 January 2023	Third round	Third round	2	0	1	1	2	3	−1	0.00
EFL Cup	9 August 2022	9 August 2022	First round	First round	1	0	0	1	0	1	−1	0.00
Total					49	10	16	23	40	69	−29	20.41

As of 8 May 2023

== Championship ==
Win Draw Loss

On 23 June, the league fixtures were announced.

30 July 2022 1	Wigan Athletic	0–0	Preston North End	Wigan
15:00 BST	Power (yellow card) 28'; Darikwa (yellow card) 59'	Report	Browne (yellow card) 42'; Hughes (yellow card) 46'; Woodburn (yellow card) 76'; Evans (red card) 80'	Stadium: DW Stadium; Attendance: 15,429; Referee: Bobby Madley

6 August 2022 2	Norwich City	1–1	Wigan Athletic	Norwich
12:30 BST	Aarons 61'	Report	McClean 29'; Power (yellow card) 45+1'; Aasgaard (yellow card) 90+2'; Nyambe (yellow card) 90+7'; Amos (yellow card) 90+11'	Stadium: Carrow Road; Referee: Matt Donohue

13 August 2022 3	Wigan Athletic	1–1	Bristol City	Wigan
15:00 BST	Bennett (yellow card) 18'; Keane 67'	Report	Weimann 6'; Atkinson (yellow card) 62'; Klose (yellow card) 75'	Stadium: DW Stadium; Attendance: 9,822; Referee: John Busby

20 August 2022 5	Birmingham City	0–1	Wigan Athletic	Birmingham
15:00 BST		Report	Bennett (red card) 10'; Keane (yellow card) 66'; Naylor (yellow card) 71'; Broadhead 82'	Stadium: St Andrews; Attendance: 16,013; Referee: Andy Davies

27 August 2022 6	Wigan Athletic	1–5	Burnley	Wigan
15:00 BST	Tilt (yellow card) 2'; Keane 43' (pen.)	Report	Rodriguez 17'; Brownhill 27', 86'; Muric (yellow card) 41'; Tella 51'; Bastien 88'	Stadium: DW Stadium; Attendance: 14,506; Referee: James Bell

30 August 2022 7	Wigan Athletic	1–1	West Bromwich Albion	Wigan
19:45 BST	Magennis 6', (yellow card) 45+3'; McClean (yellow card) 69'	Report	Grant 22'; Molumby (yellow card) 73'; Phillips (yellow card) 80'	Stadium: DW Stadium; Attendance: 10,526; Referee: Andy Woolmer

3 September 2022 8	Luton Town	1–2	Wigan Athletic	Luton, Bedfordshire
15:00 BST	Morris 39', (yellow card) 70'	Report	Lockyer 80' (o.g.); Aasgaard 88'; Power (yellow card) 90+3'	Stadium: Kenilworth Road; Attendance: 9,885; Referee: Chris Kavanagh

13 September 2022 10	Huddersfield Town	1–2	Wigan Athletic	Huddersfield
19:45 BST	Mbete (yellow card) 23'; Thomas (yellow card) 45+3'; Lees 76'	Report	Keane 25' (pen.); Lang (yellow card) 53', (goal) 82'; Shinnie (yellow card) 71'	Stadium: John Smiths Stadium; Attendance: 17,941; Referee: Jeremy Simpson

17 September 2022 11	Wigan Athletic	0–1	Reading	Wigan
15:00 BST	Shinnie (yellow card) 36'; Wyke (yellow card) 83'; Naylor (yellow card) 87'	Report	Ince 63'; Baba Rahman (yellow card) 67', Yiadom (yellow card) 90+1'	Stadium: DW Stadium; Attendance: 10,113; Referee: David Webb

1 October 2022 12	Rotherham United	0–2	Wigan Athletic	Rotherham
15:00 BST	Wood (yellow card) 45'; Cuffy (yellow card) 50'; Wiles (yellow card) 52'	Report	Keane 12'; Amos (yellow card) 73', Naylor 84'	Stadium: DW Stadium; Attendance: 10,761; Referee: Andy Davies

8 October 2022 13	Hull City	2–1	Wigan Athletic	Hull
15:00 BST	Pelkas 21'; Coyle (yellow card) 23'; Elder (yellow card) 45' Estupiñán 65'; Slater (yellow card) 89'	Report	Keane 14'; Magennis (yellow card) 23'	Stadium: MKM Stadium; Attendance: 14,669; Referee: Andy Woolmer

8 October 2022 14	Wigan Athletic	1–3	Cardiff City	Wigan
15:00 BST	Bennett (yellow card) 20'; Power (yellow card) 43'; Shinnie (yellow card) 61'; Wyke 83', (yellow card) 90'	Report	Robinson 7'; Ralls (yellow card) 57'; O'Dowda (yellow card) 61'; Ojo 65'; Wintle 90+1'	Stadium: DW Stadium; Attendance: 10,470; Referee: James Bell

11 October 2022 9	Wigan Athletic	1–0	Blackburn Rovers	Wigan
19:45 BST	Naylor (yellow card) 27'; Broadhead 62'; McClean (yellow card) 79'	Report	Brererton Diaz (yellow card) 87'	Stadium: DW Stadium; Attendance: 13,611; Referee: Josh Smith
Note: original fixture was postponed as a mark of respect, following the passing of Queen Elizabeth II.

15 October 2022 15	Sunderland	2–1	Wigan Athletic	Wigan
15:00 BST	Embleton (yellow card) 25', (goal) 54'; Cirkin 72'; Pritchard (yellow card) 83'; Patterson (yellow card) 85'	Report	Tilt (yellow card) 29'; Wyke 44'; Keane (yellow card) 90+6'	Stadium: DW Stadium; Attendance: 37,016; Referee: Keith Stroud

19 October 2022 16	Wigan Athletic	1–4	Middlesbrough	Wigan
19:45 GMT	Tilt (yellow card) 12'; Keane 34'	Report	Akpom (yellow card) 12', (goal) 69' (pen.); Jones 44'; Watmore 51'; Hackney 57', Crooks (yellow card) 72'	Stadium: DW Stadium; Attendance: 10,226; Referee: Leigh Doughty

22 October 2022 17	Queens Park Rangers	2–1	Wigan Athletic	West London
15:00 BST	Field 12'; Balogun 24'; Richards (yellow card) 90+3'	Report	Tilt (yellow card) 18'; Broadhead 22'; Shinnie (yellow card) 90+6'	Stadium: Loftus Road; Attendance: 16,353; Referee: Dean Whitestone

29 October 2022 18	Wigan Athletic	0–1	Watford	Wigan
15:00 BST	Darikwa (yellow card) 14'; Shinnie (yellow card) 62'	Report	Sierralta (yellow card) 42'; Choudhury (yellow card) 77'; Pedro 87'	Stadium: DW Stadium; Attendance: 10,642; Referee: Matt Donohue

2 November 2022 19	Wigan Athletic	0–1	Stoke City	Wigan
19:45 GMT	Naylor (yellow card) 26'	Report	Thompson (yellow card) 44'; Tymon 62'	Stadium: DW Stadium; Attendance: 10,223; Referee: Sam Barrott

5 November 2022 20	Swansea City	2–2	Wigan Athletic	Landore
15:00 GMT	Manning 44' (yellow card) 90+4'; Cooper (yellow card) 64'; Piroe 84' (pen.)	Report	Keane 8' (yellow card) 72'; Naylor 16'; Magennis (yellow card) 83'	Stadium: Swansea.com Stadium; Attendance: 16,644; Referee: Craig Pawson

8 November 2022 4	Coventry City	2–0	Wigan Athletic	Coventry
19:45 GMT	Sheaf (yellow card) 38'; Panzo (yellow card) 63'; Hamer 77'; Gyökeres 90+5'	Report	Whatmough (yellow card) 21'	Stadium: The Coventry Building Society Arena; Attendance: 17,227; Referee: Steve Martin
Note: Match scheduled for 16 August, was postponed due to issues with the playing surface.

12 November 2022 21	Wigan Athletic	2–1	Blackpool	Wigan
15:00 GMT	McClean 54'; Tilt 88'; Lang (yellow card) 45'; Bennett (yellow card) 81'; Magennis (yellow card) 84'	Report	Ekpiteta (red card) 17'; Madine 37'; Carey (yellow card) 58'; Thompson (yellow card) 90'	Stadium: DW Stadium; Attendance: 14,059; Referee: Andy Davies

10 December 2022 22	Millwall	1–1	Wigan Athletic	Bermondsey
15:00 GMT	Wallace (yellow card) 14'; Flemming 40'	Report	Keane 33'; Darikwa (yellow card) 52'; Tilt (yellow card) 62'	Stadium: The Den; Attendance: 12,698; Referee: Keith Stroud

19 December 2022 23	Wigan Athletic	1–2	Sheffield United	Wigan
20:00 GMT	Tilt (yellow card) 15'; Broadhead 65'	Report	Egan 8', (yellow card) 40'; Sharp (yellow card) 15', (goal) 56'; Clark (yellow card) 67'	Stadium: DW Stadium; Attendance: 11,556; Referee: Dean Whitestone

26 December 2022 24	Middlesbrough	4–1	Wigan Athletic	Middlesbrough
15:00 GMT	Forss 26'; Akpom 49', 59', 90+3'; Hackney (yellow card) 79'; Smith (yellow card) 80'	Report	Aasgard 61'; Hughes (yellow card) 66'	Stadium: Riverside Stadium; Attendance: 31,048; Referee: Oliver Langford

29 December 2022 25	Wigan Athletic	1–4	Sunderland	Wigan
19:45 GMT	McClean (yellow card) 11'; Keane 42'; Tilt (yellow card) 61'	Report	Simms 19'; Ballard (yellow card) 59'; Stewart 66' (pen.); Roberts 85'; Diallo 89'	Stadium: DW Stadium; Attendance: 14,615; Referee: Michael Salisbury

2 January 2023 26	Wigan Athletic	1–4	Hull City	Wigan
15:00 GMT	Tilt (yellow card) 42'; Broadhead 63'	Report	Seri (yellow card) 6'; Greaves 15' (yellow card) 90'; Estupiñán 78'; Smith 85', 90+1'	Stadium: DW Stadium; Attendance: 12,522; Referee: Geoff Eltringham

14 January 2023 27	Cardiff City	1–1	Wigan Athletic	Leckwith
15:00 GMT	Ralls (yellow card) 21'; Simpson (yellow card) 41'; Ng (yellow card) 70'; O'Dowda 82'; Allsop (yellow card) 90+1'	Report	Caulker (yellow card) 79'; Magennis (yellow card) 90+5'; Keane 90+6'	Stadium: Cardiff City Stadium; Attendance: 18,041; Referee: Jeremy Simpson

21 January 2023 28	Wigan Athletic	0–2	Luton Town	Wigan
15:00 GMT	McClean (yellow card) 72'; Caulker (yellow card) 90+5'	Report	Cornick 11'; Adebayo 53', (yellow card) 72'; Potts (yellow card) 76'; Clark (yellow card) 85'	Stadium: DW Stadium; Attendance: 11,125; Referee: Andy Woolmer

6 February 2023 30	Blackburn Rovers	0–0	Wigan Athletic	Blackburn
20:00 GMT	Carter (yellow card) 70'; Brereton Diaz (yellow card) 84'; Rankin-Costello (yellow card) 88'	Report	McClean (yellow card) 88'	Stadium: Ewood Park; Attendance: 14,540; Referee: Matthew Donohue

11 February 2023 31	Wigan Athletic	1–0	Huddersfield Town	Wigan
15:00 GMT	Tiéhi (yellow card) 66'; Whatmough 82'	Report	Waghorn (yellow card) 22'	Stadium: DW Stadium; Attendance: 12,268; Referee: Gavin Ward

15 February 2023 32	Bristol City	1–1	Wigan Athletic	Bristol
19:45 GMT	Atkinson 36'; Tanner (yellow card) 90+1'; Sykes (yellow card) 90+2'	Report	Fletcher 65'; Nyambe (yellow card) 71'; Whatmough (yellow card) 81'; McClean (yellow card) 90+2'	Stadium: Ashton Gate; Attendance: 18,766; Referee: Keith Stroud

18 February 2023 33	Wigan Athletic	0–0	Norwich City	Wigan
15:00 GMT	Caulker (yellow card) 90+3'; Darikwa (yellow card) 90+5'	Report	K. McLean (yellow card) 77'; Aarons (yellow card) 90+5'	Stadium: DW Stadium; Attendance: 11,603; Referee: Geoff Eltringham

25 February 2023 34	Preston North End	2–1	Wigan Athletic	Preston
15:00	Johnson 53' (pen.); Cannon 57', (yellow card) 77'; Brady (yellow card) 87' (yellow-red card) 90+5'; Potts (yellow card) 90+9'	Report	Cunningham 27' (o.g.); Sinani (yellow card) 86'	Stadium: Deepdale; Attendance: 17,842; Referee: Thomas Bramall

4 March 2023 35	Wigan Athletic	1–1	Birmingham City	Wigan
15:00	Sinani (yellow card) 12'; Fletcher 60'; McClean (yellow card) 66'	Report	Bacuna 4', (yellow card) 30'; Chang (yellow card) 43'; Hogan (penalty missed) 66'	Stadium: DW Stadium; Attendance: 13,741; Referee: Steve Martin

7 March 2023 29	West Bromwich Albion	1–0	Wigan Athletic	West Midlands
20:00	Dike 27'	Report	Rekik (yellow card) 36'; Magennis (yellow card) 90'	Stadium: The Hawthorns; Attendance: 21,552; Referee: Rebecca Welch
Note: Original match on 28 January postponed, due to West Bromwich Albions involvement in the FA Cup

11 March 2023 36	Burnley	3–0	Wigan Athletic	Burnley
15:00	Tella 14', 47'; Foster 76'; Roberts (yellow card) 79'	Report	Rekik (yellow card) 9' (yellow-red card) 28'; Lang (yellow card) 45'; Darikwa (yellow card) 50'; McClean (yellow card) 79'	Stadium: Turf Moor; Attendance: 20,249; Referee: John Busby

14 March 2023 37	Wigan Athletic	1–1	Coventry City	Wigan
19:45 GMT	Darikwa (yellow card) 55'; McFadzean 83' (o.g.)	Report	Gyökeres 52'; Hamer (yellow card) 87'	Stadium: DW Stadium; Attendance: 11,014; Referee: Andy Woolmer

18 March 2023 38	Watford	1–1	Wigan Athletic	Watford
15:00 GMT	Davis 45', (yellow card) 89'; Louza (yellow card) 90+6'	Report	Power (yellow card) 29'; Rekik (yellow card) 29'; Sinani (yellow card) 45+2'; McClean 51'; Darikwa (yellow card) 67'	Stadium: Vicarage Road; Attendance: 18,523; Referee: Graham Scott

1 April 2023 39	Wigan Athletic	1–0	Queens Park Rangers	Wigan
15:00 BST	Power 6' (pen.), (yellow card) 81'; Omar Rekik (yellow card) 90+3'	Report	Ethan Laird (yellow card) 19'; Dickie (yellow card) 50'	Stadium: DW Stadium; Attendance: 12,608; Referee: Gavin Ward

7 April 2023 40	Sheffield United	1–0	Wigan Athletic	Sheffield
15:00 BST	Ndiaye 8'; Fleck (yellow card) 86'; Ahmedhodžić (yellow card) 90+3'	Report	Tiéhi (yellow card) 39'	Stadium: Bramall Lane; Attendance: 29,026; Referee: Andy Davies

10 April 2023 41	Wigan Athletic	0–2	Swansea City	Wigan
15:00 BST	Lang (yellow card) 40'; Hughes (yellow card) 45+3'; Whatmough (yellow card) 90+1'	Report	Piroe 14', 34'; Manning (yellow card) 45+4'	Stadium: DW Stadium; Attendance: 11,634 (778 away); Referee: Sam Allison

15 April 2023 42	Blackpool	1–0	Wigan Athletic	Blackpool
15:00 BST	Yates 2'; Anderson (yellow card) 90+7'	Report	Lang (yellow card) 66'; Pearce (yellow card) 90+7'	Stadium: Bloomfield Road; Attendance: 12,027; Referee: Thomas Bramall

18 April 2023 43	Stoke City	0–1	Wigan Athletic	Stoke-on-Trent
19:45 BST	Thompson (yellow card) 27'; Powell (yellow card) 90+3'	Report	Power (yellow card) 32'; Keane 54'; Nyambe (yellow card) 68'	Stadium: Bet365 Stadium; Attendance: 17,726; Referee: Tom Nield

22 April 2023 44	Wigan Athletic	2–1	Millwall	Wigan
15:00 BST	Keane 14'; Aasgaard 84'; McClean (yellow card) 90+6'	Report	Saville 30'; Styles (yellow card) 37'; Cooper (yellow card) 45'	Stadium: DW Stadium; Attendance: 10,858 (1,284 away); Referee: Bobby Madley

29 April 2023 45	Reading	1–1	Wigan Athletic	Reading
15:00 BST	Casadei (yellow card) 80'; Méïté 90+3', (yellow card) 90+7'	Report	Hughes 81'; Power (yellow card) 90'	Stadium: Select Car Leasing Stadium; Attendance: 21,919; Referee: Andy Davies

8 May 2023 46	Wigan Athletic	0–0	Rotherham United	Wigan
15:00 BST		Report	Hjelde (yellow card) 59'; Harding (yellow card) 60'	Stadium: DW Stadium; Attendance: 17,788; Referee: Tim Robinson

=== League table ===
Pos	Team	Pld	W	D	L	GF	GA	GD	Pts	Promotion, qualification or relegation
19	Rotherham United	46	11	17	18	49	60	−11	50	
20	Queens Park Rangers	46	13	11	22	44	71	−27	50	
21	Cardiff City	46	13	10	23	41	58	−17	49	
22	Reading (R)	46	13	11	22	46	68	−22	44 (Note: Reading were deducted 6 points for breaching an EFL business plan.)	Relegation to League One
23	Blackpool (R)	46	11	11	24	48	72	−24	44	Relegation to League One
24	Wigan Athletic (R)	46	10	15	21	38	65	−27	42 (Note: In March 2023, Wigan Athletic were deducted 3 points for failing to pay players and staff on time.)	Relegation to League One

Source: EFL Official Website
Rules for classification: 1) Points; 2) Goal difference; 3) Number of goals scored; 4) Head-to-head results; 5) Wins; 6) Away goals; 7) Penalty points (sec 9.5); 8) 12-point sending off offences
(R) Relegated

== Results summary ==
Overall								Home						Away					
Pld	W	D	L	GF	GA	GD	Pts	W	D	L	GF	GA	GD	W	D	L	GF	GA	GD
46	10	15	21	38	65	−27	45	5	7	11	17	35	−18	5	8	10	21	30	−9

Last updated: 8 May 2023.

=== Results by round ===
Away
Home
Win
Draw
Loss
postponed

Round	1	2	3	4	5	6	7	8	9	10	11	12	13	14	15	16	17	18	19	20	21	22	23	24	25	26	27	28	29	30	31	32	33	34	35	36	37	38	39	40	41	42	43	44	45	46
Ground	H	A	H	A	H	H	A	A	H	A	A	H	H	A	H	A	H	H	A	A	H	A	H	A	H	H	A	H	A	H	A	H	A	H	A	A	H	A	H	A	H	A	A	H	A	H
Result	D	D	D	W	L	D	W	W	L	W	L	L	W	L	L	L	L	L	D	L	W	D	L	L	L	L	D	L	D	W	D	D	L	D	L	L	D	D	W	L	L	L	W	W	D	D
Position	17	16	15	19	15	20	18	15	11	12	10	12	16	9	15	17	19	22	22	23	22	22	23	23	24	24	24	24	24	22	22	24	24	23	24	24	24	24	24	24	24	24	24	24	24	24

Updated to match(es) played on 8 May 2023. Source:

== FA Cup ==
The Latics were drawn away to Luton Town in the third round.

Win Draw Loss Fixtures

7 January 2023 Third round	Luton Town	1–1	Wigan Athletic	Luton
15:00 GMT	Cornick 45'; Potts (yellow card) 89'	Report	Naylor 17'	Stadium: Kenilworth Road; Attendance: 5,660; Referee: David Webb

17 January 2023 Third round replay	Wigan Athletic	1–2	Luton Town	Wigan
19:45 GMT	Power (yellow card) 45+2'; Aasgaard 46'; Whatmough (yellow card) 56'; Tilt (yellow card) 79'; Hughes (yellow card) 90+7'	Report	Woodrow 51'; Burke (yellow card) 89'; Adebayo 90+8'	Stadium: DW Stadium; Attendance: 5,668; Referee: Matt Donohue

== EFL Cup ==
Win Draw Loss Fixtures

Wigan were drawn away to Fleetwood Town in the first round.

9 August 2022 First round	Fleetwood Town	1–0	Wigan Athletic	Fleetwood
19:45 BST	Rooney (yellow card) 10'; Garner 24'; Batty (yellow card) 51'	Report	Nyambe (yellow card) 19'; Shinnie (yellow card) 51'; Hughes (yellow card) 70'	Stadium: Highbury Stadium; Attendance: 1,761; Referee: Michael Salisbury

== Statistics ==
As of 17 January 2023
Players with names in italics and marked * were on loan from another club for the whole of their season with Wigan Athletic.

No.	Pos	Nat	Player	Total		Championship		FA Cup		EFL Cup	
No.	Pos	Nat	Player	Apps	Goals	Apps	Goals	Apps	Goals	Apps	Goals
1	GK	(England) ENG	Jamie Jones	16	0	14+1	0	1+0	0	0+0	0
2	DF	(Namibia) NAM	Ryan Nyambe	16	0	7+7	0	1+0	0	1+0	0
3	DF	(England) ENG	Tom Pearce	2	0	0+1	0	0+0	0	1+0	0
4	MF	(England) ENG	Tom Naylor	27	3	18+7	2	2+0	1	0+0	0
5	DF	(England) ENG	Jack Whatmough	25	0	23+0	0	2+0	0	0+0	0
6	MF	(Jamaica) JAM	Jordan Cousins	9	0	6+2	0	1+0	0	0+0	0
7	MF	(Wales) WAL	Gwion Edwards	3	0	0+3	0	0+0	0	0+0	0
8	MF	(England) ENG	Max Power	28	0	26+0	0	2+0	0	0+0	0
9	FW	(England) ENG	Charlie Wyke	14	2	8+6	2	0+0	0	0+0	0
10	FW	(Republic of Ireland) IRL	Will Keane	28	10	26+0	10	0+2	0	0+0	0
11	MF	(Republic of Ireland) IRL	James McClean	28	2	26+0	2	1+1	0	0+0	0
12	GK	(England) ENG	Ben Amos	15	0	13+0	0	2+0	0	0+0	0
14	FW	(Republic of Ireland) IRL	Anthony Scully	4	0	0+4	0	0+0	0	0+0	0
15	DF	(Scotland) SCO	Jason Kerr	15	0	12+3	0	0+0	0	0+0	0
16	DF	(Jamaica) JAM	Curtis Tilt	27	1	24+1	1	2+0	0	0+0	0
18	MF	(Scotland) SCO	Graeme Shinnie	21	0	8+12	0	0+0	0	1+0	0
19	FW	(England) ENG	Callum Lang	20	1	16+2	1	2+0	0	0+0	0
21	DF	(England) ENG	Joe Bennett	14	0	9+4	0	1+0	0	0+0	0
23	FW	(England) ENG	Ashley Fletcher*	12	0	2+8	0	2+0	0	0+0	0
25	DF	(England) ENG	Rarmani Edmonds-Green*	5	0	2+2	0	1+0	0	0+0	0
27	DF	(Zimbabwe) ZIM	Tendayi Darikwa	25	0	20+3	0	1+1	0	0+0	0
28	FW	(Northern Ireland) NIR	Josh Magennis	23	1	9+13	1	0+1	0	0+0	0
30	MF	(Norway) NOR	Thelo Aasgaard	27	3	9+15	2	2+0	1	1+0	0
32	DF	(England) ENG	Charlie Hughes	6	0	3+0	0	2+0	0	1+0	0
35	DF	(England) ENG	Kieran Lloyd	1	0	0+0	0	0+0	0	0+1	0
36	MF	(Wales) WAL	Scott Smith	1	0	0+0	0	0+0	0	1+0	0
41	FW	(England) ENG	Luke Brennan	1	0	0+0	0	0+0	0	1+0	0
42	MF	(England) ENG	Harry McHugh	1	0	0+0	0	0+0	0	1+0	0
44	MF	(Republic of Ireland) IRL	Baba Adeeko	1	0	0+0	0	0+0	0	0+1	0
49	FW	(England) ENG	Josh Stones	1	0	0+0	0	0+0	0	0+1	0
Players out on loan:
31	DF	(England) ENG	James Carragher	1	0	0+0	0	0+0	0	1+0	0
39	FW	(England) ENG	Stephen Humphrys	3	0	0+2	0	0+0	0	1+0	0

=== Disciplinary record ===
As of 17 January 2023

Rank	No.	Nat.	Po.	Name	Championship			FA Cup			EFL Cup			Total		
Rank	No.	Nat.	Po.	Name	Booked	(yellow card) (yellow-red card)	Sent off (straight red)	Booked	(yellow card) (yellow-red card)	Sent off (straight red)	Booked	(yellow card) (yellow-red card)	Sent off (straight red)	Booked	(yellow card) (yellow-red card)	Sent off (straight red)
1	16	(Jamaica)	CB	Curtis Tilt	8	0	0	1	0	0	0	0	0	9	0	0
1	18	(Scotland)	DM	Graeme Shinnie	6	0	0	0	0	0	1	0	0	7	0	0
3	4	(England)	DM	Tom Naylor	4	0	0	0	0	0	0	0	0	4	0	0
3	8	(England)	CM	Max Power	4	0	0	1	0	0	0	0	0	5	0	0
3	21	(England)	LB	Joe Bennett	3	0	1	0	0	0	0	0	0	3	0	1
3	27	(Zimbabwe)	RB	Tendayi Darikwa	4	0	0	0	0	0	0	0	0	4	0	0
7	10	(Republic of Ireland)	CF	Will Keane	3	0	0	0	0	0	0	0	0	3	0	0
7	11	(Republic of Ireland)	LM	James McClean	3	0	0	0	0	0	0	0	0	3	0	0
7	28	(Northern Ireland)	CF	Josh Magennis	3	0	0	0	0	0	0	0	0	3	0	0
10	2	(Namibia)	RB	Ryan Nyambe	1	0	0	0	0	0	1	0	0	2	0	0
10	9	(England)	CF	Charlie Wyke	2	0	0	0	0	0	0	0	0	2	0	0
10	12	(England)	GK	Ben Amos	2	0	0	0	0	0	0	0	0	2	0	0
10	19	(England)	RW	Callum Lang	2	0	0	0	0	0	0	0	0	2	0	0
10	32	(England)	CB	Charlie Hughes	1	0	0	1	0	0	1	0	0	3	0	0
15	5	(England)	CB	Jack Whatmough	1	0	0	1	0	0	0	0	0	2	0	0
15	30	(Norway)	AM	Thelo Aasgaard	1	0	0	0	0	0	0	0	0	1	0	0
Total					52	0	1	0	0	0	3	0	0	52	0	1
