= Tom Pearce (footballer) =

English footballer (born 1998)

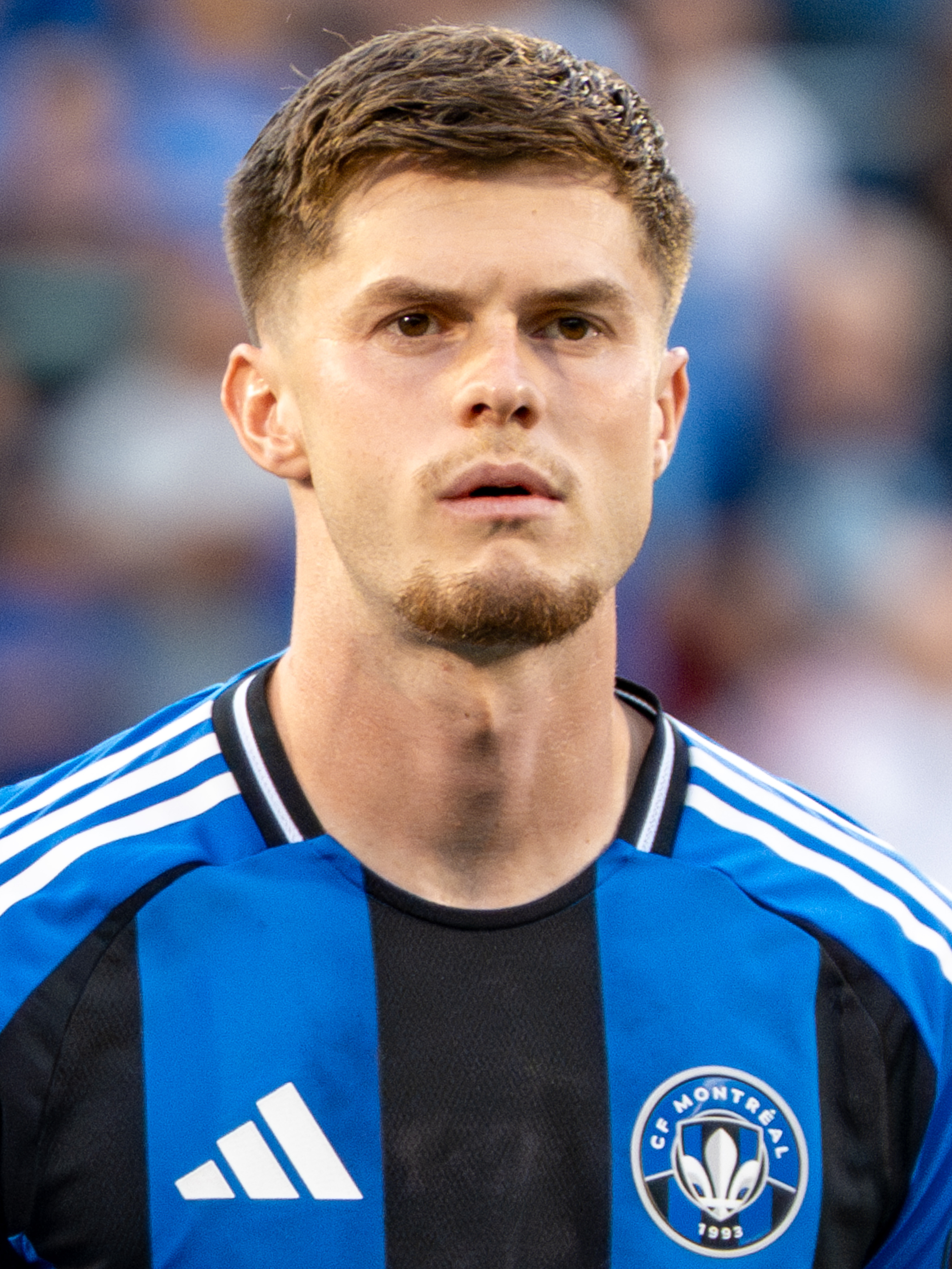
- Pearce with CF Montréal in 2025

Personal information
- Full name: Tom Mark Pearce
- Date of birth: 12 April 1998 (age 28)
- Place of birth: Ormskirk, England
- Height: 1.85 m (6 ft 1 in)
- Positions: Left-back; left wing-back

Team information
- Current team: Chesterfield
- Number: 46

Youth career
- 2003–2014: Everton
- 2014–2018: Leeds United

Senior career*
Years	Team	Apps	(Gls)
2018–2019	Leeds United	7	(1)
2019	→ Scunthorpe United (loan)	9	(1)
2019–2024	Wigan Athletic	83	(1)
2024–2025	CF Montréal	29	(1)
2026–	Chesterfield	0	(0)

International career
2018–2019	England U20	8	(0)
2018	England U21	2	(0)
- * Club domestic league appearances and goals as of 13:20, 9 January 2026 (UTC)

Tom Mark Pearce (born 12 April 1998) is an English footballer who plays as a left-back or left wing-back for EFL League Two club Chesterfield.

== Club career ==
=== Leeds United ===
Pearce started his career at Everton youth academy before joining Leeds United's academy in 2014. He rose up through the ranks of the Leeds youth academy. He impressed for Leeds Under 18s during the 2015–16 season, scoring eight goals from left back in 26 games.

On 9 June 2016, Pearce signed a professional contract for the club, progressing in Leeds' Under 23 squad. Pearce was given his first call up to the first team on 7 January 2018, when he was named on the bench against Newport County in a 2–1 defeat in the third round of the FA Cup. He was allocated squad number 46. His first involvement in a League squad came on 31 January, when he was named on the bench in a 0–0 draw against Hull City, he was again named on the bench in the consecutive league fixture on 3 February 2018 by head coach Thomas Christiansen in a 1–4 defeat against Cardiff City.

He was named on the Leeds bench again under new coach Paul Heckingbottom on 10 March 2018. He made his first start for the club on 17 March 2018 under head coach Paul Heckingbottom, starting in Leeds' Championship fixture against Sheffield Wednesday. On 16 April 2018, Pearce was nominated as one of four players for Leeds United's Young Player of The Year award.

After playing in the 1–0 defeat to Aston Villa at Villa Park, Pearce started again against Barnsley on 21 March scoring his first ever professional goal in a 2–1 victory with a long range effort. He also received the man of the match award.

With Premier League interest in Pearce from his former club Everton and also AFC Bournemouth, in May 2018 Leeds held talks with Pearce about a new contract with his current deal set to expire in June 2018. On 18 May 2018, Leeds announced they had offered Pearce a new contract. On 7 June, he signed a new four-year contract to keep him at Leeds United. On 26 July 2018, Pearce was given the number 20 shirt for the upcoming 2018–19 season for Leeds. After falling behind new signing Barry Douglas in the pecking order at the start of the season, Pearce was mainly named as a substitute under new head coach Marcelo Bielsa, until he was ruled out with a foot injury and subsequently missed 10 games due to the injury, before returning from injury on 6 January 2019 during a 2–1 defeat to Queens Park Rangers in the third round of the FA Cup.

==== Scunthorpe United loan ====
On 31 January 2019, Pearce joined EFL League One side Scunthorpe United on a six month loan. He made his debut on 9 February in a 2–0 win against Accrington Stanley.

In total, he made nine appearances for Scunthorpe in League One, scoring his only goal for the club on 12 March 2019 with a long range strike in a 4–1 win over Southend United.

After returning to Leeds in the summer of 2019, in July 2019, Pearce was the subject of interest of a loan move to Greek Super League side Aris Thessaloniki F.C. who would also play in the Europa League in the upcoming 2019–20 season.

=== Wigan Athletic ===
On deadline day in summer 2019, Pearce signed a three-year deal with Wigan Athletic for an undisclosed fee. He scored his first goal for Wigan in an EFL Trophy tie against Port Vale on 6 October 2020. In January 2022, Pearce signed a further contract with Wigan Athletic until summer 2024.

On 10 May 2024 the club announced he would be released.

=== CF Montréal ===
On 12 July 2024, Pearce signed a two-and-a-half-year deal with Major League Soccer side CF Montréal. Following Montréal's 2025 season, Pearce's contract with the club was terminated.

=== Chesterfield ===
On 9 January 2026, Pearce returned to England, joining League Two club Chesterfield on an eighteen-month contract.

== International career ==
On 18 May 2018, Pearce received a call up to England U21s for the first time by manager Adrian Boothroyd, for the Toulon Tournament with Englands group containing fixtures against Qatar, China and Mexico. He made his debut on 26 May against China in a 2–1 victory. On 9 June 2018, he was named on the bench for the 2018 Toulon Tournament final against Mexico U21 with England winning the tournament after beating Mexico 2–1 in the final.

In September 2018, Pearce was called up to the England U20 squad for the first time, and was an unused substitute on 6 September in a 2–0 victory against Switzerland U20s. He made his debut for the Under 20s on 10 September against Netherlands U20.

Pearce was called-up to the England U20 squad for the 2019 Toulon Tournament.

== Career statistics ==
As of match played 14 March 2026

Appearances and goals by club, season and competition
Club	Season	League			National cup (Note: Includes FA Cup and Canadian Championship)		League cup		Other		Total	
Club	Season	Division	Apps	Goals	Apps	Goals	Apps	Goals	Apps	Goals	Apps	Goals
Leeds United	2017–18	Championship	5	1	0	0	0	0	—		5	1
Leeds United	2018–19	Championship	2	0	1	0	2	0	0	0	5	0
Leeds United	Total		7	1	1	0	2	0	0	0	10	1
Scunthorpe United (loan)	2018–19	League One	9	1	—		—		—		9	1
Wigan Athletic	2019–20	Championship	7	0	1	0	0	0	—		8	0
Wigan Athletic	2020–21	League One	23	0	1	0	1	0	3 (Note: Appearance(s) in EFL Trophy)	1	28	1
Wigan Athletic	2021–22	League One	16	0	4	0	2	0	5	0	27	0
Wigan Athletic	2022–23	Championship	13	0	0	0	1	0	—		14	0
Wigan Athletic	2023–24	League One	24	1	1	0	1	0	2	1	28	2
Wigan Athletic	Total		83	1	7	0	5	0	10	2	105	3
CF Montréal	2024	MLS	8	1	—		—		4 (Note: Three appearances, one goal in Leagues Cup; One appearance in MLS Cup Playoffs)	1	12	2
CF Montréal	2025	MLS	21	0	3	0	—		1 (Note: Appearance(s) in Leagues Cup)	0	25	0
CF Montréal	Total		29	1	3	0	—		5	1	37	2
Chesterfield	2025–26	League Two	11	1	—		—		—		11	1
Career total			139	5	11	0	7	0	15	3	172	8

== Honours ==
Wigan Athletic

- EFL League One: 2021–22

England U21

- Toulon Tournament: 2018
