= Omar Rekik =

Tunisian footballer (born 2001)

Personal information
- Date of birth: 20 December 2001 (age 24)
- Place of birth: Helmond, Netherlands
- Height: 1.88 m (6 ft 2 in)
- Position: Centre-back

Team information
- Current team: Ludogorets Razgrad
- Number: 44

Youth career
- –2012: Feyenoord
- 2012–2014: Manchester City
- 2014–2015: PSV
- 2015–2017: Marseille
- 2017–2021: Hertha BSC
- 2021–2022: Arsenal

Senior career*
Years	Team	Apps	(Gls)
2020–2021	Hertha BSC II	8	(1)
2021–2024	Arsenal	0	(0)
2022–2023	→ Sparta Rotterdam (loan)	6	(0)
2022	→ Jong Sparta (loan)	1	(0)
2023	→ Wigan Athletic (loan)	11	(0)
2023–2024	→ Wigan Athletic (loan)	10	(0)
2024	→ Servette (loan)	0	(0)
2025–2026	Maribor	46	(2)
2026–	Ludogorets Razgrad	0	(0)

International career^{‡}
2018	Tunisia U21	1	(0)
2018–2019	Netherlands U18	3	(1)
2021–	Tunisia	8	(1)
- * Club domestic league appearances and goals as of 8 September 2026 ‡ National team caps and goals as of 21 June 2026

Omar Rekik (Arabic: عمر رقيق; born 20 December 2001) is a professional footballer who plays as a centre-back for Bulgarian First League club Ludogorets Razgrad. Born in the Netherlands, he represents the Tunisia national team.

== Early life ==
Born in Helmond, Netherlands to a Tunisian father and a Dutch mother, Rekik was part of several big European clubs during his youth career, following his brother Karim from Feyenoord to Manchester City, then PSV and Marseille, before joining Hertha Berlin in 2017. However, their careers eventually split during the 2020–21 season, as Omar was transferred from the Bundesliga side to Arsenal in January 2021, while Karim joined Spanish side Sevilla a few months earlier.

== Club career ==
Ahead of the 2022–23 season, Arsenal sent Rekik on loan to Dutch club Sparta Rotterdam, where he stayed until January 2023, before joining EFL Championship side Wigan Athletic for the remainder of the season. After making eleven league appearances, his loan with the Latics was extended for another half-season until January 2024.

On 2 February 2024, Rekik moved on a new loan to Servette in Switzerland, with an option to buy.

On 2 January 2025, Rekik joined Slovenian PrvaLiga club Maribor.

== International career ==
While his brother Karim was already capped for the senior Netherlands national team, Omar was first selected in the Tunisia under-21 selection in October 2018, aged just 16, before joining the Netherlands under-18 a month later.

Rekik eventually decided to join the Tunisia national team in May 2021, as he was selected by Mondher Kebaier along with other young players such as Hannibal Mejbri. He made his international senior debut on 15 June 2021, starting as a midfielder in a 1–0 friendly win against Mali.

On 15 May 2026, Rekik was named in the Tunisia squad for the 2026 FIFA World Cup. On 14 June 2026, he scored his first senior international goal in the team's opener against Sweden.

== Career statistics ==
=== Club ===
As of 22 January 2024

Appearances and goals by club, season and competition
Club	Season	League			National cup		League cup		Continental		Other		Total	
Club	Season	Division	Apps	Goals	Apps	Goals	Apps	Goals	Apps	Goals	Apps	Goals	Apps	Goals
Hertha BSC II	2020–21	Regionalliga Nordost	8	1	—		—		—		—		8	1
Arsenal	2020–21	Premier League	0	0	0	0	0	0	—		0	0	0	0
Arsenal	2021–22	Premier League	0	0	0	0	0	0	—		—		0	0
Arsenal	2022–23	Premier League	0	0	0	0	0	0	—		—		0	0
Arsenal	Total		0	0	0	0	0	0	—		0	0	0	0
Arsenal U23	2021–22	—			—		—		—		2 (Note: Appearances in EFL Trophy)	0	2	0
Sparta Rotterdam (loan)	2022–23	Eredivisie	6	0	0	0	—		—		—		6	0
Wigan Athletic (loan)	2022–23	Championship	11	0	—		—		—		—		11	0
Wigan Athletic (loan)	2023–24	League One	10	0	2	0	0	0	—		2	0	14	0
Servette	2023–24	Swiss Super League	0	0	0	0	—		—		—		0	0
Career total			35	1	2	0	0	0	0	0	4	0	41	1

=== International ===
As of match played 20 June 2026

Appearances and goals by national team and year
National team	Year	Apps	Goals
Tunisia	2021	1	0
Tunisia	2022	2	0
Tunisia	2026	5	1
Total		8	1

Scores and results list Tunisia's goal tally first, score column indicates score after each Rekik goal.

List of international goals scored by Omar Rekik
No.	Date	Venue	Cap	Opponent	Score	Result	Competition
1	14 June 2026	Estadio BBVA, Guadelupe, Mexico	7	Sweden	1–2	1–5	2026 FIFA World Cup
