= Josh Magennis =

Northern Irish association footballer (born 1990)

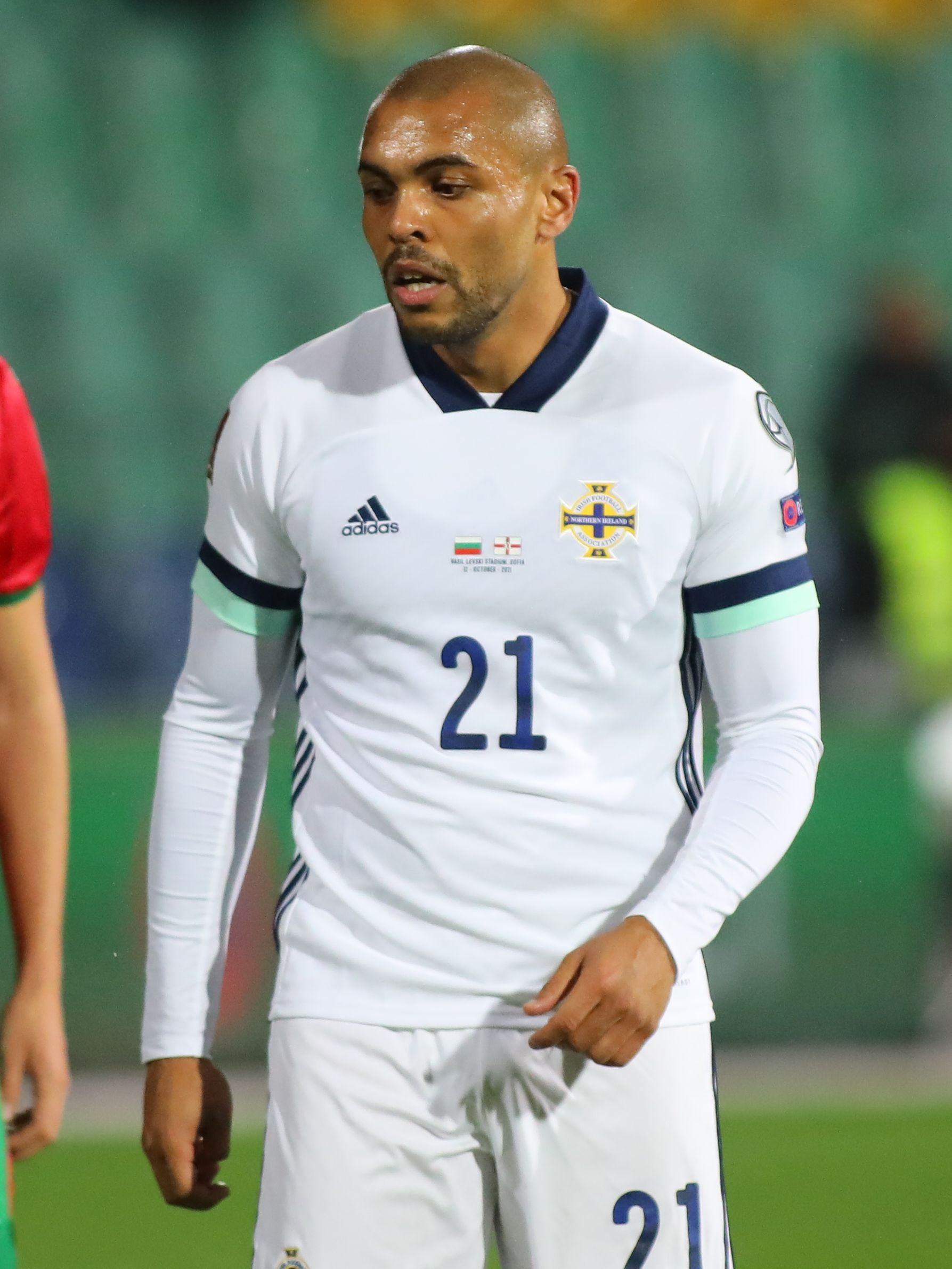
- Magennis with the Northern Ireland in 2021

Personal information
- Full name: Joshua Brendan David Magennis
- Date of birth: 15 August 1990 (age 36)
- Place of birth: Bangor, Northern Ireland
- Height: 6 ft 2 in (1.88 m)
- Position: Striker

Team information
- Current team: Stevenage
- Number: 9

Youth career
- Bryansburn Rangers
- 2005–2006: Lisburn Distillery
- 2006–2007: Glentoran
- 2007–2009: Cardiff City

Senior career*
Years	Team	Apps	(Gls)
2009–2010	Cardiff City	9	(0)
2009	→ Grimsby Town (loan)	2	(0)
2010–2014	Aberdeen	105	(10)
2014	→ St Mirren (loan)	13	(0)
2014–2016	Kilmarnock	72	(18)
2016–2018	Charlton Athletic	81	(20)
2018–2019	Bolton Wanderers	42	(4)
2019–2022	Hull City	88	(24)
2022–2024	Wigan Athletic	89	(11)
2024–2026	Exeter City	77	(13)
2026–	Stevenage	5	(1)

International career^{‡}
2007	Northern Ireland U17	2	(0)
2008–2009	Northern Ireland U19	6	(1)
2009–2012	Northern Ireland U21	17	(4)
2010–	Northern Ireland	95	(12)
- * Club domestic league appearances and goals as of 17:10, 6 September 2026 (UTC) ‡ National team caps and goals as of 00:15, 18 November 2026 (UTC)

Joshua Brendan David Magennis (born 15 August 1990) is a Northern Irish footballer who plays as a striker for EFL League One club Stevenage and the Northern Ireland national team.

Having spent the majority of his youth career as a goalkeeper, he switched to striker in 2008 before turning professional in 2009. Magennis has previously played for Cardiff City, Grimsby Town, Aberdeen, St Mirren, Kilmarnock, Charlton Athletic, Bolton Wanderers, Hull City, Wigan Athletic and Exeter City.

== Club career ==
=== Early career ===
Magennis began his career as an outfield player, playing up front, even representing County Down in the Milk Cup as a youngster, before eventually becoming a goalkeeper. He was a member of the Lisburn Distillery and Glentoran youth teams before joining the youth team at Cardiff City.

=== Cardiff City ===
On 31 October 2007, Cardiff met Liverpool in the Football League Cup but, with David Forde and on-loan goalkeeper Kasper Schmeichel ineligible, Magennis took a spot on the bench for the match. The decision to include Magennis was controversial because he had been called up to the Northern Ireland under-19 team but was not allowed to join the squad by manager Dave Jones due to the need to keep the youngster at Cardiff, with only one senior goalkeeper available for the match. In April 2008 he reverted to playing as a striker, just before the Welsh Youth Cup final where he came on as a substitute.

Magennis signed his first professional contract on 10 April 2009 for Cardiff City, the only second year academy student to be offered a professional deal, and began working with reserve team coach Paul Wilkinson who had previously coached former Cardiff striker Cameron Jerome in a similar manner. On 8 August 2009, Magennis made his professional debut when he replaced Jay Bothroyd as a late substitute on the opening day of the 2009–10 season in a 4–0 win over Scunthorpe United. In his fourth appearance for the club, Magennis scored his first professional goal during a 3–1 win over Bristol Rovers in the second round of the League Cup.

The return of Ross McCormack and Warren Feeney from injury meant that Magennis fell down the pecking order at Cardiff and he was allowed to join League Two side Grimsby Town on a one-month loan deal on 15 October 2009 He made his debut against Rochdale on 17 October 2009, which was to be the last game managed by Mike Newell, who was sacked the following morning. Magennis made just one more appearance for the side before, on 29 October 2009, he was told that he and fellow loanee Arnaud Mendys loan contracts were to be terminated ahead of schedule. Caretaker manager Neil Woods commented that "As the caretaker manager I think I need to be fair to the players that we've got here first. They've been a little bit of a victim of the circumstances of the last two weeks. They are not going to get in the eighteen and I don't think it is fair to keep loan players here."

Magennis made his first start for Cardiff on 9 January 2010 in a 1–1 draw with Blackpool, but was forced off after just 35 minutes after suffering a fractured fibula. He made his comeback as a substitute on the last day of the regular season against Derby County. He was given a free transfer by Cardiff at the end of the season along with Peter Enckelman, Warren Feeney, Tony Capaldi and Aaron Morris.

=== Aberdeen ===
On 5 July 2010, Magennis signed a deal with Aberdeen, on their first day of pre-season training. After signing for the club, Magennis said he was looking forward to developing at the club and that he believed that then-manager Mark McGhee could help him become a better striker.

He started in Aberdeen's first game of the 2010–11 season at home to Hamilton Academical, where he hit the crossbar in a 4–0 win and played 90 minutes. On 6 November 2010, Magennis scored an own goal during a 9–0 defeat against Celtic, the scoreline was the biggest win in the SPL and also the biggest defeat in the history of Aberdeen. He scored his first goal for the Dons on 8 January 2011, the final goal of their 6–0 Scottish Cup win over Second Division club East Fife and also set up a goal for Scott Vernon. One month later, Magennis scored his first league goal in a 5–0 victory over Kilmarnock on 19 February 2011. Later in the season, Magennis scored against Dundee United (3–1 loss) and Hibernian (3–1 win) during the final games of the season.

In the pre-season friendly against German side Borussia Mönchengladbach, which Aberdeen lost 5–2, Magennis scored from 45 yards. After the match, Magennis then criticised the referee Max Ebbels for errors he'd made during the match. He came on as a substitute in Aberdeen's first game of the 2011–12 season at home to St Johnstone in a 0–0 draw. Magennis scored his first goal of the season in a 3–3 draw against Dunfermline Athletic on 26 November 2011. Soon in January, Magennis was told by the club's management to look for a new club, but nothing happened in the transfer window. Magennis then vowed to try and earn a new contract. Towards the end of season, Magennis played in the right back position, He said about playing in this position: "I feel more comfortable because the game is in front of me and I'm able to dictate play with overlaps and what passes I'm picking. It's good for my football knowledge. I'm able to read the game better so it's a better position for me." At the end of the 2011/12 season, Magennis signed a contract extension at Aberdeen, to run until the end of the 2012–13 season.

In the 2012–13 season, Magennis continued to play at right back after Rory McArdle left the club. On 23 September 2012, Magennis scored his first goal of the season, in injury time in a 3–3 draw against Motherwell. His impressive performance caught the attention of the club's legend Billy Williamson who said he believed Magennis can achieve same the level of success at the club that he did. Soon after scoring his first goal of the season, Manager Craig Brown began negotiating with Magennis to sign a new contract. Due to the club's injury crisis, Magennis said he was willing to play in any position if any players suffered an injury. On 27 November 2012, Magennis scored a brace in a 3–2 loss against Inverness Caledonian Thistle and on 16 March 2013, scored a brace in a 4–3 loss against Celtic. After the match, Craig Brown was confident that Magennis would sign a new contract at the club. Magennis, himself, said he was aiming to sign a new contract. Eventually, at the end of the season, Magennis was the only out of contract player to be offered a new deal as thirteen players were released and he signed one-year deal to stay with the club.

The following 2013–14 season, Magennis started mostly coming on as a substitute and it wasn't until on 14 September 2013 when he scored his first goal of the season, in a 3–0 win over Partick Thistle. However, his season was overshadowed by his knee injury, forcing him to undergo surgery. At the end of the 2013–14 season, Magennis was released by the club. Upon his release, he was linked with a move to Scotland and England.

==== St Mirren (loan) ====
On 30 January 2014, it was announced that Magennis signed a loan deal with St Mirren until the end of season 2013–14. Magennis made thirteen appearances for the club, scoring zero goals, before his loan spell came to an end.

=== Kilmarnock ===
Magennis signed a three-year contract with Kilmarnock in July 2014. He made his debut on 9 August 2014, in a 1–1 draw with Dundee and scored his first goal on 16 August 2014, as Kilmarnock won 2–1 away at Ross County. Magennis went on to start every single league game of his first season scoring eight goals.

In February 2016, Magennis, was the subject of racist abuse from Hearts supporters at their Tynecastle ground in Edinburgh. A statement from Hearts clarified that Magennis had been abused because he is Northern Irish, not because he is black.

On 6 August 2016, Kilmarnock announced they had turned down an offer of £100,000 possibly rising to £200,000 for Magennis from Charlton Athletic. Earlier that day he had been left out of Kilmarnock's squad to play Motherwell, with manager Lee Clark saying Magennis had told him he "didn't feel right for today's game." Earlier in the week, Kilmarnock had also rejected a bid from Oldham Athletic.

=== Charlton Athletic ===
On 11 August 2016, Magennis joined League One side Charlton Athletic on a two-year deal. He scored his first goal for the club in a 2–2 draw with Fleetwood Town on 10 September 2016. On 2 January 2017, Magennis bagged a hat-trick against Bristol Rovers, his first in English football.

=== Bolton Wanderers ===
On 30 July 2018, Magennis joined Bolton Wanderers for an undisclosed fee later revealed to be £200,000. This was Bolton's first cash signing in three and a half years. He made his debut on the opening day of the season, 4 August, starting against newly relegated West Bromwich Albion and opened the scoring in the 18th minute. Bolton went on to win the game 2–1. He scored for the second game in a row, scoring Bolton's second in a 2–2 home draw against Bristol City on 11 August. He scored a hat-trick in the FA Cup third round in a 5–2 win against Walsall on 5 January 2019.

=== Hull City ===
On 8 August 2019, Magennis joined Hull City on a two-year deal. Magennis made his first appearance for Hull City in the first round of the EFL Cup in the 0–3 away win against Tranmere Rovers. In April 2021, after scoring six goals in the month, Magennis was awarded the League One Player of the Month award, a month that finished with Hull achieving promotion back to the Championship with a 2–1 victory over Lincoln City, a match where Magennis opened the scoring. On 18 May 2021, the club announced that they had exercised the option of a one-year contract extension for Magennis.

=== Wigan Athletic ===
On 13 January 2022, Magennis joined Wigan Athletic on a two-and-a-half-year deal, for an undisclosed fee. He scored his first goal for the club on 15 March 2022 in a 2–0 win against Crewe Alexandra.

On 10 May 2024 the club announced he would be released in the summer when his contract expired.

=== Exeter City ===
On 27 June 2024, Magennis was signed as a free agent by Exeter City on a one-year deal.

On 5 May 2025, Exeter City announced that Magennis had activated a one-year extension to his contract.

=== Stevenage ===
On 27 June 2026, Magennis signed a one-year contract with Stevenage. His debut was during the 2–1 victory against Wycombe Wanderers in the EFL Cup first round on 7 August 2026 in which he scored the winning goal after 90+5 minutes.

== International career ==
While still playing as a goalkeeper, Magennis featured twice for the Northern Ireland Under-17 side, in a 2–0 defeat to Scotland and as a substitute in a 1–0 defeat to the Netherlands. His step up to the under-19 side came following his change of position and he was handed his debut on 8 October 2008 in 3–1 defeat to Serbia under-19's. In July 2009, Magennis helped Northern Ireland retain their Milk Cup crown, scoring the first goal in their 2–0 final victory against Denmark.

On 11 August 2009, Magennis made his debut for the Under-21 side, playing in a 2–1 defeat to Portugal. He grabbed his first two goals for the Under-21 side after coming off the bench in their 6–2 defeat to Iceland on 8 September 2009.

He made his full debut for Northern Ireland on 26 May 2010 against Turkey in a friendly.

On 8 October 2015, Magennis scored his first international goal in a 3–1 defeat of Greece at Windsor Park which ensured Northern Ireland's qualification for UEFA Euro 2016, the country's first appearance at an international tournament in 30 years.

== Personal life ==
Magennis was born in Bangor, County Down. His uncle Mark was also a footballer who played for Ballymena United, Linfield and Bangor. As a teenager, Magennis revealed he once nearly quit football for rugby after struggling as a goalkeeper before eventually switching position to striker. On 28 January 2013, Magennis became a father after his girlfriend, Amy, gave birth to a son.

== Career statistics ==
=== Club ===
As of match played 5 September 2026

Appearances and goals by club, season and competition
Club	Season	League			National cup (Note: Includes Scottish Cup, FA Cup)		League cup (Note: Includes Scottish League Cup, EFL Cup)		Other		Total	
Club	Season	Division	Apps	Goals	Apps	Goals	Apps	Goals	Apps	Goals	Apps	Goals
Cardiff City	2009–10	Championship	9	0	0	0	1	1	0	0	10	1
Grimsby Town (loan)	2009–10	League Two	2	0	—		—		—		2	0
Aberdeen	2010–11	Scottish Premier League	29	3	5	1	2	0	—		36	4
Aberdeen	2011–12	Scottish Premier League	23	1	2	0	2	0	—		27	1
Aberdeen	2012–13	Scottish Premier League	35	5	2	0	3	1	—		40	6
Aberdeen	2013–14	Scottish Premiership	18	1	1	0	1	0	—		20	1
Aberdeen	Total		105	10	10	1	8	1	—		123	12
St Mirren (loan)	2013–14	Scottish Premiership	13	0	—		—		—		13	0
Kilmarnock	2014–15	Scottish Premiership	38	8	1	0	2	0	—		41	8
Kilmarnock	2015–16	Scottish Premiership	34	10	3	0	1	2	1 (Note: Appearance in Scottish Premiership relegation play-off)	0	39	12
Kilmarnock	2016–17	Scottish Premiership	0	0	—		4	0	—		4	0
Kilmarnock	Total		72	18	4	0	7	2	1	0	84	20
Charlton Athletic	2016–17	League One	39	10	2	0	0	0	0	0	41	10
Charlton Athletic	2017–18	League One	42	10	1	0	1	0	3 (Note: One appearance in the EFL Trophy and two in the League One play-offs)	0	47	10
Charlton Athletic	Total		81	20	3	0	1	0	3	0	88	20
Bolton Wanderers	2018–19	Championship	42	4	2	3	1	0	—		45	7
Hull City	2019–20	Championship	29	4	1	0	2	1	—		32	5
Hull City	2020–21	League One	40	18	1	1	1	0	2 (Note: Appearance in the EFL Trophy)	0	44	19
Hull City	2021–22	Championship	19	2	0	0	0	0	0	0	19	2
Hull City	Total		88	24	2	1	3	1	2	0	95	26
Wigan Athletic	2021–22	League One	17	3	1	0	—		1	0	19	3
Wigan Athletic	2022–23	Championship	36	1	1	0	0	0	0	0	37	1
Wigan Athletic	2023–24	League One	36	7	3	0	0	0	3	3	42	10
Wigan Athletic	Total		89	11	5	0	0	0	4	3	98	12
Exeter City	2024–25	League One	40	6	4	6	1	0	1	0	46	12
Exeter City	2025–26	League One	37	7	3	0	1	0	2	2	43	9
Exeter City	Total		77	13	7	6	2	0	3	2	89	21
Stevenage	2026–27	League One	5	1	0	0	2	1	0	0	7	2
Career total			583	101	33	11	25	6	13	5	654	123

=== International ===
As of match played 17 November 2026

Appearances and goals by national team and year
National team	Year	Apps	Goals
Northern Ireland	2010	3	0
Northern Ireland	2013	2	0
Northern Ireland	2014	4	0
Northern Ireland	2015	8	1
Northern Ireland	2016	10	0
Northern Ireland	2017	8	3
Northern Ireland	2018	5	0
Northern Ireland	2019	10	3
Northern Ireland	2020	7	1
Northern Ireland	2021	8	0
Northern Ireland	2022	4	2
Northern Ireland	2023	7	1
Northern Ireland	2024	6	1
Northern Ireland	2025	4	0
Northern Ireland	2026	9	0
Total		95	12

Scores and results list Northern Ireland's goal tally first.

List of international goals scored by Josh Magennis
No.	Date	Venue	Cap	Opponent	Score	Result	Competition
1	8 October 2015	Windsor Park, Belfast, Northern Ireland	15	Greece	2–0	3–1	UEFA Euro 2016 qualification
2	1 September 2017	San Marino Stadium, Serravalle, San Marino	30	San Marino	1–0	3–0	2018 FIFA World Cup qualification
3	1 September 2017	San Marino Stadium, Serravalle, San Marino	30	San Marino	2–0	3–0	2018 FIFA World Cup qualification
4	5 October 2017	Windsor Park, Belfast, Northern Ireland	32	Germany	1–3	1–3	2018 FIFA World Cup qualification
5	24 March 2019	Windsor Park, Belfast, Northern Ireland	42	Belarus	2–1	2–1	UEFA Euro 2020 qualification
6	8 June 2019	A. Le Coq Arena, Tallinn, Estonia	43	Estonia	2–1	2–1	UEFA Euro 2020 qualification
7	10 October 2019	De Kuip, Rotterdam, Netherlands	47	Netherlands	1–0	1–3	UEFA Euro 2020 qualification
8	15 November 2020	Ernst-Happel-Stadion, Vienna, Austria	56	Austria	1–0	1–2	2020–21 UEFA Nations League B
9	25 March 2022	Stade de Luxembourg, Luxembourg City, Luxembourg	66	Luxembourg	1–0	3–0	Friendly
10	24 September 2022	Windsor Park, Belfast, Northern Ireland	68	Kosovo	2–1	2–1	2022–23 UEFA Nations League B
11	14 October 2023	Windsor Park, Belfast, Northern Ireland	74	San Marino	2–0	3–0	UEFA Euro 2024 qualification
12	15 October 2024	Windsor Park, Belfast, Northern Ireland	81	Bulgaria	5–0	5–0	2024-25 UEFA Nations League C

== Honours ==
Hull City

- EFL League One: 2020–21

Wigan Athletic

- EFL League One: 2021–22

Individual

- EFL League One Player of the Month: April 2021
- FA Cup top scorer: 2024–25
