= Thelo Aasgaard =

English-born Norwegian footballer (born 2002)

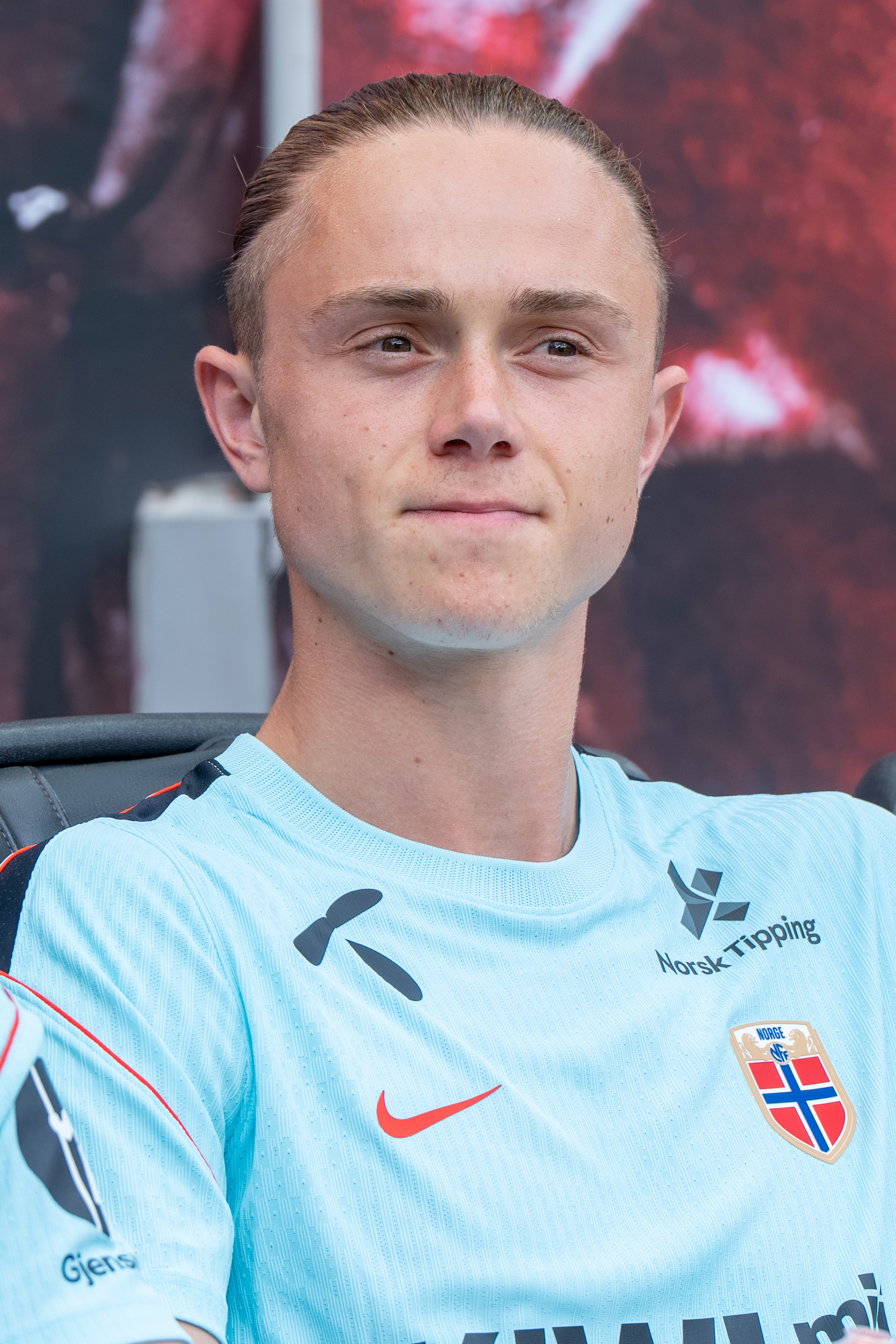
- Aasgaard with Norway in 2026

Personal information
- Full name: Thelonious Gerard Aasgaard
- Date of birth: 2 May 2002 (age 24)
- Place of birth: Liverpool, England
- Height: 1.88 m (6 ft 2 in)
- Position: Midfielder

Team information
- Current team: Anderlecht (on loan from Rangers)
- Number: 19

Youth career
- 2010–2016: Liverpool
- 2016–2020: Wigan Athletic

Senior career*
Years	Team	Apps	(Gls)
2020–2025	Wigan Athletic	140	(23)
2025	Luton Town	17	(2)
2025–	Rangers	35	(8)
2026–	→ Anderlecht (loan)	4	(0)

International career^{‡}
2018	Norway U16	3	(0)
2021–2023	Norway U20	5	(1)
2023–2024	Norway U21	11	(2)
2025–	Norway	13	(6)
- * Club domestic league appearances and goals as of 20:01, 25 October 2026 (UTC) ‡ National team caps and goals as of 14 November 2026

Thelonious "Thelo" Gerard Aasgaard (pronounced /ˈtɛloʊ ˈæzɡɑːd/; TELL-oh AZ-gard; Norwegian pronunciation: [ˈteːlʊ ˈoːsɡoːr]; born 2 May 2002) is a professional footballer who plays as a midfielder for Belgian Pro League club Anderlecht on loan from Scottish Premiership club Rangers. Born in England, he represents the Norway national team.

== Early life and youth career ==
Aasgaard was born in Liverpool in 2002. Both of his parents have musical backgrounds; his father Jonathan is a professional cellist, and his mother Georgina is a music and health practitioner. He was brought up in the Liverpool suburb of Mossley Hill and attended Calderstones School in Allerton. Aasgaard joined the youth academy of Wigan Athletic at the age of 14, having previously been a part of the youth set-up at Liverpool, and signed scholarship forms with the club in 2018. His progress in the academy ranks was interrupted by injuries during the following two seasons, but he impressed enough for his scholarship deal to be extended for a third year in 2020.

== Club career ==
=== Wigan Athletic ===
As a result of Wigan being put into administration in the 2019–20 season, and the team's subsequent relegation from the Championship, Aasgaard was promoted to the club's first-team squad along with several other academy players for their 2020–21 League One campaign.

Aasgaard made his professional debut with Wigan in a 1–0 EFL League One loss at home to Peterborough United on 20 October 2020. He scored his first goal for Wigan in a 2–1 defeat against Oxford United on 21 November 2020. In January 2021, Aasgaard signed his first professional contract with Wigan, signing until the summer of 2023. He ended his first season having played 35 times in all competitions, including 13 league starts, scoring three goals.

After the start of the 2021–22 season, Aasgaard signed an improved four-and-a-half-year contract, running until June 2026. In July 2023, he signed a further contract extension until 2028.

=== Luton Town ===
On 28 January 2025, Aasgaard signed for Championship side Luton Town for an undisclosed fee. On 1 February 2025, Aasgaard made his debut for Luton in a 1–1 draw against Sheffield Wednesday.

=== Rangers ===
After Luton's relegation from the Championship, Aasgaard joined Scottish Premiership club Rangers on 5 July 2025 for an undisclosed fee which was reported to be £3.5 million. He signed a contract running until 2029. After an early injury ruled him out of the opening league and European fixtures, Thelo finally made his debut coming on as a second half substitute in a 4–2 victory over Alloa Athletic in the Premier Sports League Cup.

=== Anderlecht (loan) ===
On 2 September 2026, Aasgaard signed for Belgian club Anderlecht on loan with an option to buy.

== International career ==
Aasgaard was born in Liverpool, England, and is of Norwegian descent through his father, and of French descent through his mother.

He represented the Norway under-16 team three times in 2018.

In August 2021, Aasgaard was called up to the Norway under-20 team for the first time, and made his debut on the right of midfield in their 1–1 draw with Germany under-20 on 6 September 2021.

On 9 September 2025, Aasgaard scored four goals for Norway off the bench at the 65th minute against Moldova in an 11–1 victory in the UEFA World Cup Qualifiers.

Aasgaard was included in the 26-man squad selected by Norway national team manager Ståle Solbakken for the 2026 FIFA World Cup. During their match against France on 26 June 2026 in Boston, Aasgaard scored a goal in the 20th minute, though Norway ultimately lost the match.

== Career statistics ==
=== Club ===
As of match played 25 October 2026

Appearances and goals by club, season and competition
Club	Season	League			National cup (Note: Includes FA Cup, Scottish Cup)		League cup (Note: Includes EFL Cup, Scottish League Cup)		Europe		Other		Total	
Club	Season	Division	Apps	Goals	Apps	Goals	Apps	Goals	Apps	Goals	Apps	Goals	Apps	Goals
Wigan Athletic	2020–21	League One	33	3	1	0	0	0	—		1 (Note: Appearance(s) in EFL Trophy)	0	35	3
Wigan Athletic	2021–22	League One	5	1	2	1	2	0	—		5	0	14	2
Wigan Athletic	2022–23	Championship	41	3	2	1	1	0	—		—		44	4
Wigan Athletic	2023–24	League One	35	8	3	3	1	0	—		1	0	40	11
Wigan Athletic	2024–25	League One	26	8	3	3	1	1	—		1	0	31	12
Wigan Athletic	Total		140	23	11	8	5	1	—		8	0	164	32
Luton Town	2024–25	Championship	17	2	—		—		—		—		17	2
Rangers	2025–26	Scottish Premiership	33	7	2	1	3	0	10 (Note: Two appearances in UEFA Champions League, eight appearances in UEFA Europa League)	0	—		48	8
Rangers	2026–27	Scottish Premiership	2	1	0	0	0	0	3 (Note: Two appearances in UEFA Europa League, one appearance in UEFA Conference League)	0	—		5	1
Rangers	Total		35	8	2	1	3	0	13	0	—		53	9
Anderlecht (loan)	2026–27	Belgian Pro League	4	0	1	0	—		3 (Note: Appearances in UEFA Europa League)	0	—		8	0
Career total			194	31	14	9	8	1	16	0	8	0	240	41

=== International ===
As of match played 14 November 2026

Appearances and goals by national team and year
National team	Year	Apps	Goals
Norway	2025	6	5
Norway	2026	7	1
Total		13	6

Scores and results list Norway's goal tally first, score column indicates score after each Aasgaard goal.

List of international goals scored by Thelo Aasgaard
No.	Date	Venue	Cap	Opponent	Score	Result	Competition
1	22 March 2025	Zimbru Stadium, Chișinău, Moldova	1	Moldova	3–0	5–0	2026 FIFA World Cup qualification
2	9 September 2025	Ullevaal Stadion, Oslo, Norway	3	Moldova	7–0	11–1	2026 FIFA World Cup qualification
3	9 September 2025	Ullevaal Stadion, Oslo, Norway	3	Moldova	8–1	11–1	2026 FIFA World Cup qualification
4	9 September 2025	Ullevaal Stadion, Oslo, Norway	3	Moldova	9–1	11–1	2026 FIFA World Cup qualification
5	9 September 2025	Ullevaal Stadion, Oslo, Norway	3	Moldova	11–1	11–1	2026 FIFA World Cup qualification
6	26 June 2026	Gillette Stadium, Foxborough, United States	9	France	1–2	1–4	2026 FIFA World Cup
