= Jack Whatmough =

English footballer (born 1996)

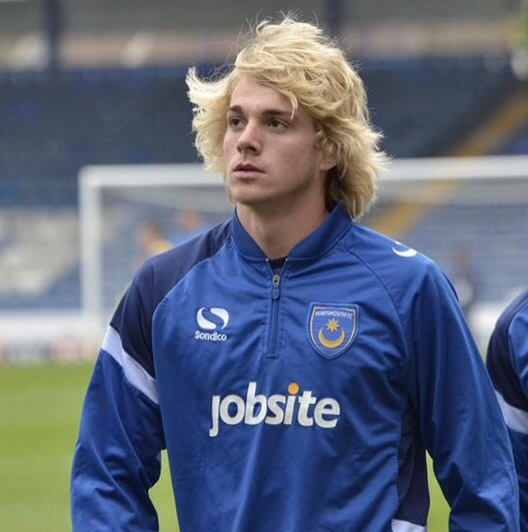
- Whatmough warming up with Portsmouth in 2014

Personal information
- Full name: Jack David Vincent Whatmough
- Date of birth: 19 August 1996 (age 30)
- Place of birth: Gosport, England
- Height: 6 ft 0 in (1.84 m)
- Position: Centre-back

Team information
- Current team: Huddersfield Town
- Number: 6

Youth career
- 2009–2012: Portsmouth

Senior career*
Years	Team	Apps	(Gls)
2012–2021	Portsmouth	121	(3)
2016	→ Havant & Waterlooville (loan)	4	(0)
2021–2023	Wigan Athletic	83	(3)
2023–2025	Preston North End	38	(0)
2025–	Huddersfield Town	4	(1)

International career^{‡}
2014	England U18	1	(0)
2014	England U19	1	(0)
- * Club domestic league appearances and goals as of 6 December 2025 (UTC) ‡ National team caps and goals as of 21:15, 13 September 2014 (UTC)

Jack David Vincent Whatmough (born 19 August 1996) is an English professional footballer who plays for EFL League One club Huddersfield Town as a centre-back.

== Club career ==
=== Portsmouth ===
Whatmough was born in Gosport and played for Southampton. At the age of 13 he decided to leave Southampton F.C. He then trained with Portsmouth and joined Academy. He signed a two-year scholarship deal with Pompey on 6 July 2012.

On 14 August 2012, Whatmough appeared on the bench in a 0–3 away defeat against Plymouth Argyle. He finished the season with 26 youth appearances, with the Academy being crowned champions.

On 19 August 2013, Whatmouth signed a three-year professional deal. On 28 September he appeared again on the bench, in a 2–4 away defeat against York City.

On 26 November, Whatmough made his professional debut, starting in a 1–2 home loss against Southend United. He signed a contract extension with Portsmouth on 10 April 2014, later revealing via Twitter that his deal was extended until 2017.

On 6 January 2016, Whatmough joined Havant and Waterlooville on a one-month loan to continue his rehabilitation from a serious knee injury which had kept him out since March 2015.

On 25 February 2017, Whatmough scored his first professional goal for Portsmouth in a 3–0 away win over Carlisle United In June 2021, Whatmough left Portsmouth at the end of his contract.

=== Wigan Athletic ===
On 4 June 2021, Whatmough joined fellow League One side Wigan Athletic on a free transfer. He scored his first goal for Wigan in a 4-1 win at Accrington Stanley on 18 September 2021. The 2021–22 season saw Wigan promoted as Champions, Whatmough being named Wigan Athletic's Player of the Season.

On 13 February 2023, he signed a new eighteen-month contract.

On 26 July 2023, Whatmough left Wigan alongside Jamie McGrath following advice from the Professional Footballers' Association after repeated contractual breaches by the club's previous owners.

=== Preston North End ===
On 2 August 2023, Whatmough joined Championship side Preston North End on a three-year professional deal.

=== Huddersfield Town ===
On 9 July 2025, Whatmough joined League One side Huddersfield Town on a two-year contract, joining for an undisclosed fee.

== International career ==
On 16 December 2013, Whatmough was called up to train with England U18's. He then made his international debut on 5 March of the following year, starting in a 2–1 loss against Croatia at St George's Park.

== Career statistics ==
As of 9 August 2025

Appearances and goals by club, season and competition
Club	Season	League			National cup		League cup		Other		Total	
Club	Season	Division	Apps	Goals	Apps	Goals	Apps	Goals	Apps	Goals	Apps	Goals
Portsmouth	2012–13	League One	0	0	0	0	0	0	0	0	0	0
Portsmouth	2013–14	League Two	12	0	0	0	0	0	0	0	12	0
Portsmouth	2014–15	League Two	22	0	1	0	1	0	0	0	24	0
Portsmouth	2015–16	League Two	2	0	0	0	0	0	0	0	2	0
Portsmouth	2016–17	League Two	10	1	0	0	0	0	2	0	12	1
Portsmouth	2017–18	League One	14	0	0	0	1	0	1	0	16	0
Portsmouth	2018–19	League One	26	0	4	0	0	0	0	0	30	0
Portsmouth	2019–20	League One	1	0	0	0	0	0	1	0	2	0
Portsmouth	2020–21	League One	34	2	1	0	1	0	2	0	38	2
Portsmouth	Total		121	3	6	0	3	0	6	0	136	3
Havant & Waterlooville (loan)	2015–16	National League South	4	0	0	0	—		2	0	6	0
Wigan Athletic	2021–22	League One	46	2	3	1	0	0	1	0	50	3
Wigan Athletic	2022–23	Championship	37	1	2	0	0	0	0	0	39	1
Wigan Athletic	Total		83	3	5	1	0	0	0	0	89	4
Preston North End	2023–24	Championship	22	0	0	0	1	0	0	0	23	0
Preston North End	2024–25	Championship	16	0	1	0	2	0	0	0	19	0
Preston North End	Total		38	0	1	0	2	0	0	0	41	0
Huddersfield Town	2025–26	League One	2	1	0	0	0	0	0	0	2	1
Career total			244	7	12	1	6	0	8	0	275	8

== Honours ==
Portsmouth

- EFL League Two: 2016–17
- EFL Trophy runner-up: 2019–20

Wigan Athletic

- EFL League One: 2021–22

Individual

- PFA Team of the Year: 2021–22 EFL League One
- Wigan Athletic Player of the Year: 2021–22
- EFL League One Team of the Year: 2021–22
