= 2021–22 Wigan Athletic F.C. season =

Wigan Athletic
2021–22 season
- Chairman: Talal Al Hammad
- Manager: Leam Richardson
- Stadium: DW Stadium
- League One: 1st (champions)
- FA Cup: Fourth round
- EFL Cup: Third round
- EFL Trophy: Semi-finals
- Top goalscorer: League: Will Keane (26); All: Will Keane (27)
- Highest home attendance: 20,136
- Lowest home attendance: 8,098
- Average home league attendance: 10,223
Home colours	Away colours

The 2021–22 season was Wigan Athletic's 90th year in their history and second consecutive season in League One. Along with the league, the club will also compete in the FA Cup, the EFL Cup and the EFL Trophy. The season covered the period from 1 July 2021 to 30 April 2022.

== Transfers ==
=== Transfers in ===
Date	Position	Nationality	Name	From	Fee	Ref.
1 July 2021	GK	(England)	Ben Amos	(England) Charlton Athletic	Free transfer	
1 July 2021	CM	(England)	Jordan Cousins	(England) Stoke City	Free transfer	
1 July 2021	RW	(Wales)	Gwion Edwards	(England) Ipswich Town	Free transfer	
1 July 2021	DM	(England)	Tom Naylor	(England) Portsmouth	Free transfer	
1 July 2021	CM	(England)	Max Power	(England) Sunderland	Free transfer	
1 July 2021	CB	(England)	Jack Whatmough	(England) Portsmouth	Free transfer	
7 July 2021	CF	(England)	Charlie Wyke	(England) Sunderland	Free transfer	
9 July 2021	CF	(England)	Stephen Humphrys	(England) Rochdale	Undisclosed	
16 July 2021	CM	(England)	Dean Pinnington	(England) Wolverhampton Wanderers	Free transfer	
4 August 2021	LW	(Northern Ireland)	Jordan Jones	(Scotland) Rangers	Undisclosed	
17 August 2021	LM	(Republic of Ireland)	James McClean	(England) Stoke City	Undisclosed	
31 August 2021	LB	(England)	Joe Bennett	(Wales) Cardiff City	Free transfer	
31 August 2021	CB	(Scotland)	Jason Kerr	(Scotland) St Johnstone	Undisclosed	
8 September 2021	CF	(Democratic Republic of the Congo)	Divin Baningime	Free Agent	—N/a	
13 January 2022	CF	(Northern Ireland)	Josh Magennis	(England) Hull City	Undisclosed	
16 January 2022	DM	(Scotland)	Graeme Shinnie	(England) Derby County	Undisclosed	
25 January 2022	CB	(Jamaica)	Curtis Tilt	(England) Rotherham United	Undisclosed	
31 January 2022	AM	(Republic of Ireland)	Jamie McGrath	(Scotland) St Mirren	Undisclosed	
1 February 2022	CM	(England)	Joe Adams	(England) Eastleigh	Undisclosed	
2 February 2022	CB	(Republic of Ireland)	Timi Sobowale	(United States) Real Monarchs SLC	Free transfer	

=== Loans in ===
Date from	Position	Nationality	Name	From	Date until	Ref.
9 August 2021	CB	(England)	Kelland Watts	(England) Newcastle United	End of season	
27 August 2021	CM	(England)	Tom Bayliss	(England) Preston North End	End of season	
31 August 2021	CB	(Jamaica)	Curtis Tilt	(England) Rotherham United	14 January 2022 (Note: On 14 January, Tilt was recalled by parent club Rotherham.)	
31 January 2022	DM	(Republic of Ireland)	Glen Rea	(England) Luton Town	17 March 2022	

=== Loans out ===
Date from	Position	Nationality	Name	To	Date until	Ref.
20 August 2021	GK	(England)	Owen Mooney	(England) Newcastle Town	1 January 2022	
25 October 2021	RB	(England)	Kieran Lloyd	(England) AFC Fylde	22 November 2021	
31 January 2022	LW	(Northern Ireland)	Jordan Jones	(Scotland) St Mirren	End of season	
18 March 2022	GK	(England)	Sam Tickle	(England) Nantwich Town	14 April 2022	
18 March 2022	CM	(England)	Harry McGee	(England) FC United Of Manchester	1 May 2022	

=== Transfers out ===
Date	Position	Nationality	Name	To	Fee	Ref.
4 June 2021	CM	(Wales)	Lee Evans	(England) Ipswich Town	Free transfer	
4 June 2021	CB	(England)	Jack Sanders	(Scotland) Kilmarnock	Free transfer	
10 June 2021	CM	(England)	Chris Merrie	(England) Tranmere Rovers	Undisclosed	
11 June 2021	ST	(Scotland)	Kyle Joseph	(Wales) Swansea City	Undisclosed	
16 June 2021	GK	(Wales)	Owen Evans	(England) Cheltenham Town	Free transfer	
22 June 2021	AM	(England)	Zach Clough	(England) Carlisle United	Free transfer	
23 June 2021	RB	(Republic of Ireland)	Corey Whelan	(England) Carlisle United	Free transfer	
24 June 2021	GK	(Republic of Ireland)	Bobby Jones	(England) AFC Fylde	Free transfer	
7 July 2021	RB	(England)	Joe Winstanley	(England) Brighton & Hove Albion	Undisclosed	
8 July 2021	AM	(England)	Sean McGurk	(England) Leeds United	Undisclosed	
27 July 2021	DM	(England)	Alex Perry	(England) Scunthorpe United	Free transfer	
6 August 2021	AM	(England)	Dan Gardner	(England) Doncaster Rovers	Free transfer	
7 August 2021	AM	(Northern Ireland)	MacKenzie O'Neill	(England) Prescot Cables	Free transfer	
6 September 2021	LW	(Ghana)	Joe Dodoo	(England) Doncaster Rovers	Free transfer	
24 November 2021	LW	(Nigeria)	Viv Solomon-Otabor	(Scotland) St Johnstone	Free transfer	

== Pre-season friendlies ==
Wigan Athletic announced friendlies against Oldham Athletic, AFC Fylde, Bootle, Stoke City and Preston North End as part of their pre-season preparations.

17 July 2021 Friendly	Oldham Athletic	1–2	Wigan Athletic	Oldham
15:00 BST	Hope 30'	Report	Edwards 5'; Lang 14'	Stadium: Boundary Park

20 July 2021 Friendly	AFC Fylde	0–1	Wigan Athletic	Fylde
19:30 BST		Report	Humphrys 49'	Stadium: Mill Farm Sports Village

23 July 2021 Friendly	Bootle	1–3	Wigan Athletic	Bootle
19:00 BST		Report	Aasgaard 20'; Naylor 43'; Lang 54'	Stadium: Berry Street Garage Stadium

27 July 2021 Friendly	Wigan Athletic	2–1	Stoke City	Wigan
19:30 BST	Lang 35'; Humphrys 80'	Report	Ince 42'	Stadium: DW Stadium

30 July 2021 Friendly	Wigan Athletic	3–2	Preston North End	Wigan
19:30 BST	Keane 26'; Humphrys 54'; Lang 69'	Report	Darikwa 48' (o.g.); Rodwell-Grant 87'	Stadium: DW Stadium

== Competitions ==
=== Overview ===
Competition	First match	Last match	Starting round	Record							
Competition	First match	Last match	Starting round	Pld	W	D	L	GF	GA	GD	Win %
EFL League One	7 August 2021	30 April 2022	Matchday 1	46	27	11	8	82	44	+38	58.70
FA Cup	6 November 2021	5 February 2022	First round	5	3	1	1	7	6	+1	60.00
EFL Cup	10 August 2021	21 September 2021	Third round	3	0	2	1	1	3	−2	0.00
EFL Trophy	31 August 2021	8 March 2022	Group Stage	7	3	3	1	11	4	+7	42.86
Total				61	33	17	11	101	57	+44	54.10

Last updated: 30 April 2022
Source: Competitions

== League table ==
Pos	Team	Pld	W	D	L	GF	GA	GD	Pts	Promotion, qualification or relegation
1	Wigan Athletic (C, P)	46	27	11	8	82	44	+38	92	Promotion to EFL Championship
2	Rotherham United (P)	46	27	9	10	70	33	+37	90	Promotion to EFL Championship
3	Milton Keynes Dons	46	26	11	9	78	44	+34	89	Qualification for League One play-offs
4	Sheffield Wednesday	46	24	13	9	78	50	+28	85	Qualification for League One play-offs
5	Sunderland (O, P)	46	24	12	10	79	53	+26	84	Qualification for League One play-offs
6	Wycombe Wanderers	46	23	14	9	75	51	+24	83	Qualification for League One play-offs
7	Plymouth Argyle	46	23	11	12	68	48	+20	80	
8	Oxford United	46	22	10	14	82	59	+23	76	

Source: EFL Official Website
Rules for classification: 1) Points; 2) Goal difference; 3) Number of goals scored; 4) Head-to-head results; 5) Wins; 6) Away goals; 7) Penalty points based on yellow and red cards received excluding the last four games of the season (sec 9.5); 8) 12-point sending off offences; 9) If the tie affects the automatic promotion or relegation places, a play-off game or games would be held between the two tied teams
(C) Champions; (O) Play-off winners; (P) Promoted

== Results summary ==
Overall								Home						Away					
Pld	W	D	L	GF	GA	GD	Pts	W	D	L	GF	GA	GD	W	D	L	GF	GA	GD
46	27	11	8	82	44	+38	92	13	5	5	36	22	+14	14	6	3	46	22	+24

Last updated: 26 April 2022.

=== Results by matchday ===
Matchday	1	2	3	4	5	6	7	8	9	10	11	12	13	14	15	16	17	18	19	20	21	22	23	24	25	26	27	28	29	30	31	32	33	34	35	36	37	38	39	40	41	42	43	44	45	46
Ground	A	H	H	A	H	H	A	H	H	A	A	H	A	H	H	A	A	A	H	H	A	A	A	H	A	H	A	H	H	A	A	H	H	H	A	A	H	H	H	A	A	H	A	H	A	A
Result	L	W	D	W	W	W	W	W	L	W	W	L	W	L	W	W	D	W	W	D	W	W	W	W	D	D	L	W	W	D	W	L	W	W	D	W	W	D	W	W	D	L	D	D	L	W
Position	21	12	14	9	4	2	1	1	2	1	3	4	3	3	2	1	4	2	2	2	2	4	2	1	2	2	2	2	2	2	2	2	2	2	2	2	2	2	1	1	1	1	1	1	1	1

Updated to match(es) played on 30 April 2022. Source:
A = Away; H = Home; W = Win; D = Draw; L = Loss

== League One ==
The league fixtures were revealed on 24 June 2021.

7 August 2021 1	Sunderland	2–1	Wigan Athletic	Sunderland
15:00 BST	McGeady 17' (pen.); Stewart 53'; Winchester (yellow card) 57'	Report	Edwards 15' (yellow card) 50'; Power (yellow card) 38'; Darikwa (yellow card) 87'; Wyke (yellow card) 90+6'	Stadium: Stadium of Light; Attendance: 31,549; Referee: Bobby Madley

14 August 2021 2	Wigan Athletic	1–0	Rotherham United	Wigan
15:00 BST	Robinson (yellow card) 25'; Wyke (yellow card) 45+1'; Lang (yellow card) 75'; Massey (yellow card) 87'; Keane 90+5'	Report	Harding (yellow card) 54'	Stadium: DW Stadium; Attendance: 10,217; Referee: Robert Lewis

17 August 2021 3	Wigan Athletic	1–1	Wycombe Wanderers	Wigan
19:45 BST	Lang 47'; Wyke (yellow card) 55'; Cousins (yellow card) 66'; Amos (yellow card) 81'	Report	Pendlebury (yellow card) 53'; Obita (yellow card) 87'; Stewart 90+1'	Stadium: DW Stadium; Attendance: 8,671; Referee: Anthony Backhouse

21 August 2021 4	Charlton Athletic	0–2	Wigan Athletic	Charlton
15:00 BST		Report	Darikwa 88'; McClean 90+5'	Stadium: The Valley; Attendance: 13,839; Referee: Craig Hicks

28 August 2021 5	Wigan Athletic	1–0	Portsmouth	Wigan
15:00 BST	Lang 78'; Whatmough (yellow card) 90+2'	Report		Stadium: DW Stadium; Attendance: 9,571; Referee: Christopher Sarginson

11 September 2021 7	Wigan Athletic	2–1	Doncaster Rovers	Wigan
15:00 BST	Whatmough (yellow card) 11'; Keane 24', 52'; McClean (yellow card) 25'; Wyke (yellow card) 73'; Power (yellow card) 75'	Report	Rowe 22'; Dodoo (yellow card) 25'; Smith (yellow card) 31'; Olowu (yellow card) 48'	Stadium: DW Stadium; Attendance: 8,975; Referee: Tom Nield

18 September 2021 8	Accrington Stanley	1–4	Wigan Athletic	Accrington
15:00 BST	Nottingham 52', (yellow card) 86'; Sykes (yellow card) 63'	Report	Whatmough 6'; Keane 18'; Power (yellow card) 40'; Lang (yellow card) 41'; Wyke 58', 90+4'	Stadium: Crown Ground; Attendance: 4,517; Referee: Andy Haines

25 September 2021 9	Wigan Athletic	2–0	Cheltenham Town	Wigan
15:00 BST	Lang 8', (yellow card) 65'; Cousins (yellow card) 25'; Wyke 46'; Keane (yellow card) 68'	Report		Stadium: DW Stadium; Attendance: 8,867; Referee: Josh Smith

28 September 2021 10	Wigan Athletic	1–2	Sheffield Wednesday	Wigan
19:45 BST	Whatmough (yellow card) 15'; Power (yellow card) 52'; Wyke 82' (pen.)	Report	Power 23' (o.g.); Paterson (yellow card) 39', (goal) 60'; Dunkley (yellow card) 87'; Peacock-Farrell (yellow card) 90+2'	Stadium: DW Stadium; Attendance: 11,884; Referee: Sam Barrott

2 October 2021 11	Gillingham	0–2	Wigan Athletic	Gillingham
15:00 BST	Dempsey (yellow card) 36'	Report	Naylor (yellow card) 14'; Power 64'; Keane 82'; Massey (yellow card) 86'	Stadium: Priestfield Stadium; Attendance: 4,500; Referee: Neil Hair

16 October 2021 13	Bolton Wanderers	0–4	Wigan Athletic	Bolton
15:00 BST	Johnston (yellow card) 27'; Santos (yellow card) 64'; Thomason (yellow card) 87'	Report	Keane 6'; McClean 50', 81'; Lang (yellow card) 56', (goal) 65'; Cousins (yellow card) 48'; Pearce (yellow card) 77'; Massey (yellow card) 84'	Stadium: University of Bolton Stadium; Attendance: 21,000; Referee: Charles Breakspear

19 October 2021 14	Wigan Athletic	1–2	Milton Keynes Dons	Wigan
19:45 BST	Wyke 20'; Bayliss (yellow card) 58'	Report	Kioso 30'; Darikwa 37' (o.g.); Harvie (yellow card) 66'; O'Riley (yellow card) 73'; Kasumu (yellow card) 85'	Stadium: DW Stadium; Attendance: 8,351; Referee: Darren Droysdale

23 October 2021 15	AFC Wimbledon	0–2	Wigan Athletic	Wimbledon
15:00 BST		Report	Kalambayi 50' (o.g.); Watts (yellow card) 30'; McClean (yellow card) 40' (goal) 54'; Derikwa (yellow card) 61'	Stadium: Plough Lane; Attendance: 7,979; Referee: Ollie Yates

26 October 2021 (Note: original match on 9 October postponed due to international callups) 12	Wigan Athletic	1–2	Lincoln City	Wigan
19:45 BST	Darikwa (yellow card) 18'; Watts (yellow card) 25'; Lang (yellow card) 30'; Massey 90+5'	Report	Nlundulu 14'; Robson (yellow card) 30'; Eyoma 57'; McGrandles (yellow card) 90+3'	Stadium: DW Stadium; Attendance: 8,787; Referee: Seb Stockbridge

30 October 2021 16	Wigan Athletic	2–0	Burton Albion	Wigan
15:00 BST	McClean 9'; Darikwa (yellow card) 36'; Bayliss (yellow card) 39'; Tilt 51'		Smith (red card) 15'	Stadium: DW Stadium; Attendance: 9,020; Referee: Carl Brook

2 November 2021 (Note: original match on 4 September postponed, due to international callups) 6	Fleetwood Town	2–3	Wigan Athletic	Fleetwood
19:45 GMT	Andrew 8', (yellow card) 37'; Morton 52' (pen.); Batty (yellow card) 84'; Morris (yellow card) 87'	Report	Darikwa (yellow card) 35'; Lang 62', (yellow card) 79'; Keane 68'; Tilt 72'	Stadium: Highbury Stadium; Attendance: 3,246; Referee: Ross Joyce

23 November 2021 19	Cambridge United	2–2	Wigan Athletic	Cambridge
19:45 GMT	Ironside 44'; May 53'; Knibbs (yellow card) 86'; Weir (yellow card) 89'		Keane 84'; Lang 87'	Stadium: Abbey Stadium; Attendance: 4,101; Referee: Declan Bourne

27 November 2021 20	Plymouth Argyle	1–2	Wigan Athletic	Plymouth
15:00 GMT	Mayor 43'; Camara (yellow card) 73'		Keane 35'; Naylor (yellow card) 86'; Lang 90'	Stadium: Home Park; Attendance: 15,329; Referee: Andy Woolmer

8 December 2021 21	Wigan Athletic	2–1	Shrewsbury Town	Wigan
19:45 GMT	Darikwa 2'; Aasgaard 90+2'; Humphrys (yellow card) 90+6'	Report	Bowman 39'; Daniels (yellow card) 89'; Cosgrove (yellow card) 90+1'	Stadium: DW Stadium; Attendance: 8,098; Referee: David Rock

11 December 2021 22	Wigan Athletic	1–1	Ipswich Town	Wigan
15:00 GMT	Lang 22', (yellow card) 77'; Darikwa (yellow card) 90+2'	Report	Chaplin (yellow card) 30'; Norwood 77'; Edmundson (yellow card) 83'	Stadium: DW Stadium; Attendance: 10,296; Referee: Trevor Kettle

18 December 2021 23	Oxford United	2–3	Wigan Athletic	Oxford
15:00 GMT	Williams 33'; Taylor (yellow card) 36', (goal) 59'; McGuane (yellow card) 90+1'		Keane 8'; Darikwa (yellow card) 30'; Power 32', (yellow card) 36'; Naylor (yellow card) 42'; Whatmough (yellow card) 72'; McClean 86', (yellow card) 90'	Stadium: Kassam Stadium; Attendance: 8,354; Referee: James Bell

15 January 2022 28	Doncaster Rovers	1–2	Wigan Athletic	Doncaster
15:00 GMT	Hasani (yellow card) 45+4'; Bogle 60'; Galbraith (yellow card) 70'; Dodoo (yellow card) 84'	Report	Power 11'; Keane 54'; Amos (yellow card) 85'	Stadium: Keepmoat Stadium; Attendance: 7,169; Referee: Alan Young

18 January 2022 (Note: original match on 13 November Postponed, due to international callups) 17	Morecambe	1–2	Wigan Athletic	Morecambe
19:45 GMT	Stockton 7'; McLaughlin (yellow card) 90'	Report	Keane 45+1'; Watts (yellow card) 70'; Humphrys 73'	Stadium: Mazuma Stadium; Attendance: 5,359; Referee: Sam Barrott

22 January 2022 29	Wigan Athletic	3–2	Gillingham	Wigan
15:00 GMT	Keane 8', 77'; Humphrys 21'; Darikwa (yellow card) 90'	Report	McKenzie (yellow card) 30'; Reeves 53'; O'Keefe 70'	Stadium: DW Stadium; Attendance: 9,359; Referee: Carl Boyeson

29 January 2022 30	Cheltenham Town	0–0	Wigan Athletic	Cheltenham
15:00 GMT	Williams (yellow card) 38' (yellow-red card) 90+2'	Report	Shinnie (yellow card) 45+2'; McClean (yellow card) 89'	Stadium: Whaddon Road; Attendance: 4,405; Referee: Paul Howard

1 February 2022 (Note: original match on 20 November postponed, due to Covid-19) 18	Wigan Athletic	1–1	Oxford United	Wigan
19:45 GMT	Lang 36', (yellow card) 65'; Shinnie (yellow card) 49'	Report	Taylor 23'; Moore (yellow card) 34'; Kane (yellow card) 45+2'; Brannagan (yellow card) 65'; McNally (yellow card) 69'	Stadium: DW Stadium; Attendance: 9,958; Referee: Andrew Kitchen

8 February 2022 32	Sheffield Wednesday	1–0	Wigan Athletic	Sheffield
19:45 GMT	Bannan (yellow card) 21'; 53' (pen.); Paterson (yellow card) 76'	Report	Power (yellow card) 76'	Stadium: Hillsborough Stadium; Attendance: 20,210; Referee: Tim Robinson

12 February 2022 33	Wigan Athletic	2–1	Charlton Athletic	Wigan
15:00 GMT	Darikwa (yellow card) 24'; Keane 26' (pen.); Humphrys 74'	Report	Clare (yellow card) 4'; Lee 7'; Dobson (yellow card) 55'; Kanu (yellow card) 90'	Stadium: DW Stadium; Attendance: 9,657; Referee: Tom Nield

15 February 2022 24	Wigan Athletic	2–0	Crewe Alexandra	Wigan
19:45 GMT	Naylor (yellow card) 16'; Lang 57'; McClean 82'; Watts (yellow card) 88'	Report	Murphy (yellow card) 47'	Stadium: DW Stadium; Attendance: 8,509; Referee: Tom Reeves

18 February 2022 34	Rotherham United	1–1	Wigan Athletic	Rotherham
19:45 GMT	Ihiekwe (yellow card) 73'; Rathbone 75'; Wiles (yellow card) 90+1'	Report	Humphrys 28'; McClean (yellow card) 52'; Lang (yellow card) 68'; Rea (yellow card) 90+4'; Massey (yellow card) 90+6'	Stadium: AESSEAL New York Stadium; Attendance: 10,588; Referee: Jeremy Simpson

22 February 2022 35	Wycombe Wanderers	1–3	Wigan Athletic	High Wycombe
19:45 GMT	Kaikai 22'	Report	Tilt (yellow card) 57'; Naylor 70'; Lang 78', 82'	Stadium: Adams Park; Attendance: 4,826; Referee: Thomas Bramall

26 February 2022 36	Wigan Athletic	0–3	Sunderland	Wigan
15:00 GMT	Power (yellow card) 38'; Magennis (yellow card) 45+1'; Tilt (yellow card) 84'; Naylor (yellow card) 85'	Report	Wright 2'; Matete (yellow card) 8'; Stewart 38' (pen.), (yellow card) 82', (goal) 87' (pen.); Gooch (yellow card) 45+2'; Embleton (yellow card) 71'; Pritchard (yellow card) 77'; Cirkin (yellow card) 90+6'	Stadium: DW Stadium; Attendance: 20,136; Referee: Sam Purkiss

1 March 2022 (Note: original match on 29 December Postponed, due to numerous COVID-19 cases amongst the Fleetwood squad.) 25	Wigan Athletic	2–0	Fleetwood Town	Wigan
19:45 GMT	Shinnie (yellow card) 14'; Keane 37' (pen.); McClean 42', (red card) 90+7'; Darikwa (yellow card) 66'; Power (yellow card) 81'	Report	Garner (red card) 90+7'	Stadium: DW Stadium; Attendance: 8,627; Referee: Martin Coy

5 March 2022 37	Wigan Athletic	1–0	AFC Wimbledon	Wigan
15:00 GMT	Keane 21'; Edwards (yellow card) 54'; Naylor (yellow card) 77'	Report		Stadium: DW Stadium; Attendance: 9,780; Referee: Oliver Langford

12 March 2022 38	Milton Keynes Dons	1–1	Wigan Athletic	Milton Keynes
15:00 GMT	McEachran (yellow card) 58'; Kasumu (yellow card) 75'; Darling 88'	Report	Massey (yellow card) 31'; Lang (yellow card) 39'; Naylor 58'; Tilt (yellow card) 90+1'	Stadium: Stadium MK; Attendance: 11,193; Referee: Bobby Madley

15 March 2022 (Note: original match on 26 December postponed, due to numerous COVID-19 cases amongst the Wigan squad) 24	Crewe Alexandra	0–2	Wigan Athletic	Crewe
19:45 GMT	Porter (yellow card) 89'	Report	Magennis 43'; Keane 53'; Bennett (yellow card) 62'; Darikwa (yellow card) 63'	Stadium: Alexandra Park; Attendance: 5,310; Referee: Ben Toner

19 March 2022 39	Wigan Athletic	4–1	Morecambe	Wigan
15:00 GMT	Magennis 19'; Kerr 44'; Keane 67'; Humphrys 68'		Connolly 49' (pen.); Stockton (yellow card) 75'	Stadium: DW Stadium; Attendance: 10,072; Referee: James Oldham

2 April 2022 41	Wigan Athletic	1–1	Bolton Wanderers	Wigan
12:30 BST	McClean 7', (yellow card) 16'		Santos (yellow card) 66'; Bodvarsson 83'	Stadium: DW Stadium; Attendance: 15,279; Referee: Sam Barrott

5 April 2022 (Note: original match on 1 January postponed, due to international callups) 26	Wigan Athletic	3–0	Accrington Stanley	Wigan
19:45 BST	Bennett (yellow card) 33', (goal) 38'; Magennis 42'; Keane 58'; Naylor (yellow card) 77'	Report	Nottingham (yellow card) 36'; Rich-Baghuelou (yellow card) 53'	Stadium: DW Stadium; Attendance: 9,139; Referee: Anthony Backhouse

9 April 2022 42	Lincoln City	1–3	Wigan Athletic	Lincoln
15:00 BST	Scully 14'; Cullen (yellow card) 38'		Lang 8', 72'; Keane 21'; Naylor (yellow card) 38'; Watts (yellow card) 54'; Kerr (yellow card) 56'; Darikwa (yellow card) 82'	Stadium: LNER Stadium; Attendance: 9,498; Referee: Scott Oldham

12 April 2022 (Note: original match on 26 March postponed, due to international callups) 40	Burton Albion	0–0	Wigan Athletic	Burton upon Trent
19:45 BST	Mancienne (yellow card) 35'; Niasse (yellow card) 59'; Kokolo (yellow card) 79'	Report	Watts (yellow card) 17'; Power (yellow card) 79'; Kerr (yellow card) 82'	Stadium: Pirelli Stadium; Attendance: 3,589; Referee: Andy Haines

15 April 2022 43	Wigan Athletic	1–2	Cambridge United	Wigan
17:15 BST	Lang (yellow card) 26'; Power (yellow card) 29'; Naylor 78'	Report	Knibbs 33'; Smith 43'; Williams (yellow card) 57'; Digby (yellow card) 90+4'; Mitov (yellow card) 90+6'	Stadium: DW Stadium; Attendance: 10,576; Referee: Ross Joyce

18 April 2022 44	Ipswich Town	2–2	Wigan Athletic	Ipswich
15:00 BST	Morsy (yellow card) 40', (goal) 73'; Woolfenden (yellow card) 42'; Chaplin 61'; Burns (yellow card) 71'; Bakinson (yellow card) 90+6'	Report	Watts (yellow card) 26'; Keane 45', 86'; Lang (yellow card) 60'	Stadium: Portman Road; Attendance: 21,329; Referee: Will Finnie

23 April 2022 45	Wigan Athletic	1–1	Plymouth Argyle	Wigan
15:00 BST	Bennett (yellow card) 62'; Whatmough 74'; Pearce (yellow card) 79'; Keane (yellow card) 80'	Report	Houghton (yellow card) 58'; Jephcott 63'	Stadium: DW Stadium; Attendance: 14,130; Referee: Seb Stockbridge

26 April 2022 27	Portsmouth	3–2	Wigan Athletic	Milton
19:45 BST (Note: original match on 8 January postponed, due to Wigan participating in the FA Cup 3rd Round)	Hirst 62', 64'; Curtis (yellow card) 64'; O'Brien 87'	Report	Lang 38'; Darikwa (yellow card) 42'; Keane 45+3'; Amos (yellow card) 63'	Stadium: Fratton Park; Attendance: 14,637; Referee: Craig Hicks

30 April 2022 46	Shrewsbury Town	0–3	Wigan Athletic	Shrewsbury
12:30 BST	Vela (yellow card) 61'; Leahy (yellow card) 90+3'	Report	Vela 43' (o.g.); Keane 50' (pen.), 65'	Stadium: Montgomery Waters Meadow; Attendance: 8,369; Referee: Steve Martin

== FA Cup ==
Wigan were drawn at home to Solihull Moors in the first round. away to Colchester United in the second round. at Home to Blackburn Rovers in the third round. and away to Stoke City in the Fourth round.

6 November 2021 First round	Wigan Athletic	0–0	Solihull Moors	Wigan
15:00 GMT	Darikwa (yellow card) 52'; Kerr (yellow card) 88'	Report	Williams (yellow card) 74'	Stadium: DW Stadium

16 November 2021 First round replay	Solihull Moors	1–2 (a.e.t.)	Wigan Athletic	Solihull, West Midlands
19:45 GMT	Rooney 48' (pen.) (yellow card) 68'; Harry Boyes (yellow card) 60'; Maynard (yellow card) 74'; Storer (yellow card) 90+5'	Report	Kerr 66'; Lang (yellow card) 60', 104'; Pearce (yellow card) 90+5'; Sze (yellow card) 111'	Stadium: Damson Park; Attendance: 3,703; Referee: Charles Breakspear

5 December 2021 Second round	Colchester United	1–2	Wigan Athletic	Colchester, Essex
12:30 GMT	Jasper (yellow card) 6'; Dobra (yellow card) 42'; Sears 45+1'	Report	Lang 24', 75'; Cousins (yellow card) 62'; Edwards (yellow card) 81'	Stadium: Jobserve Community Stadium; Attendance: 2,056; Referee: Carl Brook

8 January 2022 Third round	Wigan Athletic	3–2	Blackburn Rovers	Wigan
15:00 GMT	Power 61', (yellow card) 86'; McClean (yellow card) 73'; Whatmough 75'; Aasgaard 90+4'		van Hecke (yellow card) 21'; Dolan (yellow card) 33'; Khadra 49'; Buckley (yellow card) 64'; Butterworth (yellow card) 72'; Ayala 89'	Stadium: DW Stadium; Referee: Tim Robinson

5 February 2022 Fourth round	Stoke City	2–0	Wigan Athletic	Stoke on Trent
15:00 GMT	Maja 14'; Thompson (yellow card) 53'; Wilmot (yellow card) 60'; Brown 62'		Kerr (yellow card) 45'; Edwards (yellow card) 69' (yellow-red card) 74'	Stadium: Britannia Stadium; Attendance: 12,641; Referee: Geoff Eltringham

== EFL Cup ==
The Latics were drawn away to Hull City in the first round Bolton Wanderers at home in the second round and Sunderland again at home in the third round.

10 August 2021 First round	Hull City	1–1 (7–8 p)	Wigan Athletic	Kingston upon Hull
19:45 BST	Lewis-Potter 55'	Report	Humphrys 50'	Stadium: KCOM Stadium; Attendance: 4,139; Referee: Martin Coy
	Penalties
	Eaves (penalty scored); Scott (penalty scored); Wood (penalty scored); Emmanuel (penalty scored); Smith (penalty scored); Jarvis (penalty scored); Fleming (penalty scored); Bernard (penalty missed)		Keane (penalty scored); Aasgaard (penalty scored); Jo. Jones (penalty scored); Massey (penalty scored); Naylor (penalty scored); Ja. Jones (penalty scored); Robinson (penalty scored); Cousins (penalty scored)

24 August 2021 Second round	Wigan Athletic	0–0 (5–4 p)	Bolton Wanderers	Wigan
19:45 BST		Report		Stadium: DW Stadium; Attendance: 11,660; Referee: Thomas Bramall
	Penalties
	Power (penalty scored); Aasgaard (penalty scored); Jo. Jones (penalty missed); Naylor (penalty scored); Humphrys (penalty scored); Ja. Jones (penalty scored)		(penalty scored) Doyle; (penalty scored) Sarcevic; (penalty missed) Lee; (penalty scored) Afolayan; (penalty scored) Sheehan; (penalty missed) Delfouneso

21 September 2021 Third round	Wigan Athletic	0–2	Sunderland	Wigan
19:45 BST	Edwards (yellow card) 56'	Report	Broadhead 26'; O'Nien (yellow card) 45+1', (goal) 54'; Evans (yellow card) 81'; Embleton (yellow card) 82'	Stadium: DW Stadium; Attendance: 6,511; Referee: Leigh Doughty

== EFL Trophy ==
Wigan were drawn into Northern Group C alongside Crewe Alexandra, Shrewsbury Town and Wolverhampton Wanderers U21s. The group stage fixtures were announced on July 15. In the knock-out stages, they were drawn away to Oldham Athletic in the third round at home to Arsenal U21 in the quarter-final. and at home to Sutton United in the Semi Final.

Pos	Div	Team	Pld	W	PW	PL	L	GF	GA	GD	Pts	Qualification
1	L1	Crewe Alexandra	3	3	0	0	0	6	0	+6	9	Advance to Round 2
2	L1	Wigan Athletic	3	1	0	1	1	2	2	0	4	Advance to Round 2
3	L1	Shrewsbury Town	3	1	0	0	2	3	4	−1	3	
4	ACA	Wolverhampton Wanderers U21	3	0	1	0	2	1	6	−5	2	

Source: EFL.com

31 August 2021 Group game 1	Wigan Athletic	0–0 (a.e.t.) (2–4 p)	Wolverhampton Wanderers U21	Wigan
19:00 BST	Bayliss (yellow card) 34'; Humphrys (yellow card) 90+1'	Report	Campbell (yellow card) 73'	Stadium: DW Stadium; Attendance: 1,240; Referee: Marc Edwards
	Penalties
	Humphrys (penalty scored); Massey (penalty scored); Aasgaard (penalty missed); Edwards (penalty missed)		Carty (penalty scored); Campbell (penalty scored); Cundle (penalty scored); Richards (penalty missed); Kandola (penalty scored)

5 October 2021 Group game 2	Crewe Alexandra	2–0	Wigan Athletic	Crewe
19:00 BST	Finney 14'; Griffiths (yellow card) 37'; Smith 60' (o.g.); Mandron (yellow card) 90+2'	Report	Lloyd (yellow card) 43'; Humphrys (penalty missed) 52'; Pearce (yellow card) 73'; Kerr (yellow card) 89'	Stadium: Alexandra Stadium; Attendance: 925; Referee: Tom Reeves

9 November 2021 Group game 3	Wigan Athletic	2–0	Shrewsbury Town	Wigan
19:00 BST	Long 9'; Sze 54' (yellow card) 88'		Wilson (yellow card) 4'; Leahy (yellow card) 84'	Stadium: DW Stadium; Attendance: 1,121; Referee: Scott Oldham

30 November 2021 Second round	Accrington Stanley	1–1 (a.e.t.) (4–5 p)	Wigan Athletic	Accrington
19:45 GMT	Pell 18'; Sherring (yellow card) 51'; Nottingham (yellow card) 63'; Sykes (yellow card) 64'	Report	Humphrys 53'; Bayliss (yellow card) 90+5'	Stadium: Wham Stadium; Attendance: 1,131; Referee: Bobby Madley
	Penalties
	Savin (penalty scored); Bishop (penalty scored); Pell (penalty scored); Sykes (penalty scored); Hamilton (penalty missed)		Jones (penalty scored); Massey (penalty scored); Bayliss (penalty scored); Watts (penalty scored); Kerr (penalty scored)

4 January 2022 Third round	Oldham Athletic	0–6	Wigan Athletic	Oldham
19:00 GMT	Cissé (yellow card) 35'	Report	Naylor 28'; Keane 34'; Power 36'; Massey 47'; Edwards 64', 67'	Stadium: Boundary Park; Attendance: 1,831; Referee: Ross Joyce

25 January 2022 Quarter-final	Wigan Athletic	1–0	Arsenal U21	Wigan
19:00 GMT	Sze (yellow card) 24'; Carragher (yellow card) 64'; Baningime 83'	Report	Patino (yellow card) 45'	Stadium: DW Stadium; Attendance: 3,647; Referee: Ben Toner

8 March 2022 Semi-final	Wigan Athletic	1–1 (6–7 p)	Sutton United	Wigan
GMT	McClean 39'; Magennis (yellow card) 46'; Shinnie (yellow card) 65'		Randall 29'; Ajiboye (yellow card) 69'	Stadium: DW Stadium; Attendance: 6,547; Referee: James Bell
	Penalties
	Power (penalty missed); Shinnie (penalty scored); Keane (penalty scored); McClean (penalty scored); Magennis (penalty scored); Edwards (penalty scored); McGrath (penalty scored); Darikwa (penalty missed)		Eastmond (penalty scored); Beautyman (penalty missed); Milsome (penalty scored); Goodliffe (penalty scored); Bennett (penalty scored); Boldewijn (penalty scored); Bouzanis (penalty scored); John (penalty scored)

== Statistics ==
=== Appearances & Goals ===
As of 2 March 2022

No.	Pos	Nat	Player	Total		League One		FA Cup		League Cup		League Trophy	
No.	Pos	Nat	Player	Apps	Goals	Apps	Goals	Apps	Goals	Apps	Goals	Apps	Goals
1	GK	(England) ENG	Jamie Jones	11	0	0+0	0	5+0	0	2+0	0	4+0	0
2	DF	(England) ENG	Kelland Watts*	27	0	19+0	0	5+0	0	2+0	0	1+0	0
3	DF	(England) ENG	Tom Pearce	19	0	6+3	0	4+0	0	2+0	0	4+0	0
4	MF	(England) ENG	Tom Naylor	35	2	30+0	1	1+1	0	2+0	0	1+0	1
5	DF	(England) ENG	Jack Whatmough	37	1	33+0	1	2+1	0	0+0	0	1+0	0
6	MF	(England) ENG	Jordan Cousins	15	0	10+2	0	1+0	0	2+0	0	0+0	0
7	MF	(Wales) WAL	Gwion Edwards	34	3	7+15	1	4+1	0	2+0	0	5+0	2
8	MF	(England) ENG	Max Power	40	5	31+0	3	5+0	1	2+0	0	2+0	1
9	FW	(England) ENG	Charlie Wyke	17	5	15+0	5	2+0	0	0+0	0	0+0	0
10	FW	(Republic of Ireland) IRL	Will Keane	36	16	30+1	15	3+0	0	1+0	0	1+0	1
11	FW	(England) ENG	Gavin Massey	38	2	8+18	1	3+1	0	2+1	0	5+0	1
12	GK	(England) ENG	Ben Amos	35	0	33+0	0	0+0	0	1+0	0	1+0	0
15	DF	(Scotland) SCO	Jason Kerr	21	1	5+7	0	5+0	1	1+0	0	2+1	0
16	DF	(England) ENG	Curtis Tilt	19	2	13+2	2	0+1	0	1+0	0	2+0	0
17	MF	(Republic of Ireland) IRL	Jamie McGrath	2	0	1+0	0	1+0	0	0+0	0	0+0	0
18	MF	(Scotland) SCO	Graeme Shinnie	7	0	5+2	0	0+0	0	0+0	0	0+0	0
19	FW	(England) ENG	Callum Lang	38	15	30+1	12	4+0	3	0+2	0	1+0	0
20	MF	(England) ENG	Tom Bayliss*	13	0	6+0	0	3+0	0	0+0	0	4+0	0
21	DF	(England) ENG	Joe Bennett	5	0	2+0	0	1+0	0	0+0	0	2+0	0
23	MF	(Republic of Ireland) IRL	James McClean	33	8	28+2	8	0+2	0	1+0	0	0+0	0
26	MF	(Republic of Ireland) IRL	Glen Rea*	3	0	0+2	0	1+0	0	0+0	0	0+0	0
27	DF	(Zimbabwe) ZIM	Tendayi Darikwa	40	2	32+1	2	3+2	0	1+0	0	1+0	0
28	FW	(Northern Ireland) NIR	Josh Magennis	9	0	6+2	0	1+0	0	0+0	0	0+0	0
30	MF	(Norway) NOR	Thelo Aasgaard	14	2	1+4	1	0+2	1	1+1	0	4+1	0
31	DF	(England) ENG	James Carragher	4	1	0+0	0	0+0	0	0+1	0	3+0	1
32	DF	Isle of Man	Adam Long	4	0	1+0	0	0+0	0	0+0	0	3+0	0
33	FW	(England) ENG	Tom Costello	1	0	0+0	0	0+0	0	0+0	0	0+1	0
34	DF	(Scotland) SCO	Luke Robinson	10	0	1+0	0	0+2	0	1+0	0	2+4	0
35	DF	(England) ENG	Kieran Lloyd	5	0	0+0	0	0+0	0	1+1	0	3+0	0
36	MF	(Wales) WAL	Scott Smith	8	0	0+0	0	0+1	0	3+0	0	4+0	0
38	MF	(England) ENG	Harry McHugh	3	0	0+0	0	0+0	0	0+0	0	1+2	0
39	FW	(England) ENG	Stephen Humphrys	38	6	7+20	4	1+3	0	3+0	1	3+1	1
40	GK	(England) ENG	Sam Tickle	1	0	0+0	0	0+0	0	0+0	0	1+0	0
42	MF	(Republic of Ireland) IRL	Babajide Adeeko	3	0	0+0	0	0+0	0	0+1	0	1+1	0
43	MF	(England) ENG	Chris Sze	6	1	0+0	0	0+1	0	0+1	0	3+1	1
44	DF	(England) ENG	Charlie Hughes	1	0	0+0	0	0+0	0	0+0	0	0+1	0
45	FW	(Democratic Republic of the Congo) COD	Divin Baningime	3	1	0+0	0	0+0	0	0+0	0	0+3	1
Players out on loan:
14	FW	(Northern Ireland) NIR	Jordan Jones	17	0	3+6	0	0+3	0	2+1	0	1+1	0

=== Disciplinary record ===
As of 2 March 2022

Rank	No.	Nat.	Po.	Name	League One			FA Cup			League Cup			League Trophy			Total		
Rank	No.	Nat.	Po.	Name	Yellow card	(yellow card) (yellow-red card)	Red card	Yellow card	(yellow card) (yellow-red card)	Red card	Yellow card	(yellow card) (yellow-red card)	Red card	Yellow card	(yellow card) (yellow-red card)	Red card	Yellow card	(yellow card) (yellow-red card)	Red card
1	27	(Zimbabwe)	RB	Tendayi Darikwa	10	0	0	1	0	0	1	0	0	0	0	0	12	0	0
2	8	(England)	CM	Max Power	9	0	0	1	0	0	1	0	0	0	0	0	11	0	0
3	19	(England)	SS	Callum Lang	8	0	0	1	0	0	0	0	0	0	0	0	9	0	0
4	23	(Republic of Ireland)	LW	James McClean	5	0	1	1	0	0	1	0	0	0	0	0	7	0	1
5	4	(England)	DM	Tom Naylor	5	0	0	0	0	0	0	0	0	0	0	0	5	0	0
6	2	(England)	CB	Kelland Watts	4	0	0	0	0	0	0	0	0	0	0	0	4	0	0
6	3	(England)	LB	Tom Pearce	1	0	0	1	0	0	1	0	0	1	0	0	4	0	0
6	5	(England)	CB	Jack Whatmough	4	0	0	0	0	0	0	0	0	0	0	0	4	0	0
6	6	(England)	DM	Jordan Cousins	3	0	0	1	0	0	0	0	0	0	0	0	4	0	0
6	7	(Wales)	RM	Gwion Edwards	1	0	0	1	0	1	1	0	0	0	0	0	3	0	1
6	9	(England)	CF	Charlie Wyke	4	0	0	0	0	0	0	0	0	0	0	0	4	0	0
6	11	(England)	RW	Gavin Massey	4	0	0	0	0	0	0	0	0	0	0	0	4	0	0
6	20	(England)	CM	Tom Bayliss	2	0	0	0	0	0	0	0	0	2	0	0	4	0	0
14	15	(Scotland)	CB	Jason Kerr	0	0	0	2	0	0	0	0	0	1	0	0	3	0	0
15	12	(England)	GK	Ben Amos	2	0	0	0	0	0	0	0	0	0	0	0	2	0	0
15	16	(England)	CB	Curtis Tilt	2	0	0	0	0	0	0	0	0	0	0	0	2	0	0
15	18	(Scotland)	DM	Graeme Shinnie	2	0	0	0	0	0	0	0	0	0	0	0	2	0	0
15	36	(Wales)	CM	Scott Smith	0	0	0	0	0	0	1	0	0	1	0	0	2	0	0
15	39	(England)	CF	Stephen Humphrys	1	0	0	0	0	0	0	0	0	1	0	0	2	0	0
15	43	(England)	AM	Chris Sze	0	0	0	1	0	0	0	0	0	1	0	0	2	0	0
21	10	(Republic of Ireland)	CF	Will Keane	1	0	0	0	0	0	0	0	0	0	0	0	1	0	0
21	14	(Northern Ireland)	LW	Jordan Jones	1	0	0	0	0	0	0	0	0	0	0	0	1	0	0
21	26	(Republic of Ireland)	DM	Glen Rea	1	0	0	0	0	0	0	0	0	0	0	0	1	0	0
21	28	(Northern Ireland)	CF	Josh Magennis	1	0	0	0	0	0	0	0	0	0	0	0	1	0	0
21	31	(England)	CB	James Carragher	0	0	0	0	0	0	0	0	0	1	0	0	1	0	0
21	34	(Scotland)	LB	Luke Robinson	1	0	0	0	0	0	0	0	0	0	0	0	1	0	0
21	35	(England)	RB	Kieran Lloyd	0	0	0	0	0	0	0	0	0	1	0	0	1	0	0
Total					71	0	1	10	0	1	6	0	0	6	0	0	94	0	2
