= Joe Bennett (footballer) =

English footballer (born 1990)

Personal information
- Full name: Joseph Bennett
- Date of birth: 28 March 1990 (age 36)
- Place of birth: Rochdale, England
- Height: 6 ft 0 in (1.83 m)
- Position: Left back

Team information
- Current team: Walton & Hersham
- Number: 8

Youth career
- 2000–2001: Northallerton Town
- 2001–2008: Middlesbrough

Senior career*
Years	Team	Apps	(Gls)
2008–2012	Middlesbrough	85	(1)
2012–2016	Aston Villa	30	(0)
2014–2015	→ Brighton & Hove Albion (loan)	41	(1)
2015–2016	→ AFC Bournemouth (loan)	0	(0)
2016	→ Sheffield Wednesday (loan)	3	(0)
2016–2021	Cardiff City	164	(5)
2021–2023	Wigan Athletic	26	(1)
2023–2025	Oxford United	28	(0)
2025	Walton & Hersham	5	(1)
2026–	Walton & Hersham	11	(1)

International career
2009	England U19	5	(0)
2009	England U20	1	(0)
2011	England U21	3	(0)
- * Club domestic league appearances and goals as of 09:30, 7 October 2026 (UTC)

Joseph Bennett (born 28 March 1990) is an English professional footballer who plays as a defender for National League South club Walton & Hersham.

Bennett signed his first professional contract with Middlesbrough prior to the 2008–09 season and made his professional debut in May 2009 in the club's final game of the season. He went on to make more than 90 appearances in all competitions for Middlesbrough before joining Aston Villa on 29 August 2012 for an undisclosed fee. After one season as a regular in the first team, he struggled to establish himself in the side and, after loan spells with Brighton & Hove Albion, AFC Bournemouth and Sheffield Wednesday, he was sold to Cardiff City in 2016.

With Cardiff, he gained promotion to the Premier League after finishing as runners-up in the Championship during the 2017–18 season. At international level, he has been capped at U-19, U-20 and U-21 levels for England.

== Early life ==
Bennett was born in Rochdale, Greater Manchester, but moved to the northeast, settling in the village of Swainby in North Yorkshire, when he was 10 following his parents' separation. He has a sister named Ali and attended Stokesley Secondary School. His father Adrian played football at amateur level and encouraged him to play football at a young age and Bennett's idol was Liverpool midfielder Steven Gerrard. As well as football, Bennett also played netball after being introduced to the sport by his mother, who was a coach, while he also played golf and tennis.

== Club career ==
=== Middlesbrough ===
Bennett began playing football for Northallerton Town at youth level, scoring four times in his first match. One of the coaches at the club, Andy Ramsbotham, also worked for Middlesbrough as a scout and recommended Bennett for a trial with the club, resulting in him joining Middlesbrough's youth academy. However, he suffered a setback when he was de-registered by Boro at under-15 level meaning, although he could still train with the side, he was ineligible to play for them. He later had an unsuccessful trial with Newcastle United before dropping back into local Sunday league football on the recommendation of assistant academy manager Stan Nixon. During his year away from Middlesbrough, Bennett switched from his usual role as a full-back, instead playing as a forward, and "worked really hard on (his) fitness and strength" later commenting that the experience made him realise "how badly I wanted to make it." He was signed on again at the Riverside Stadium after a year, being awarded a scholarship with the under-16 side before being promoted to the club's reserve side in his late teens.

Following his spell in the reserves, Bennett secured a two-year professional deal and named in the senior squad for the first time. He was named on the bench for a number of Premier League fixtures, before making his first team debut on 24 May 2009 during a 2–1 defeat to West Ham United in the final game of the 2008–09 season, replacing Tony McMahon after 46 minutes. The defeat resulted in Middlesbrough's relegation from the Premier League.

Having been promoted to the first team, Bennett made his first appearance of the 2009–10 season in an away loss at Nottingham Forest in the League Cup, coming on as a substitute in extra time. He made his first professional start in a 2–2 draw away at Coventry City on 26 September 2009. He started Middlesbrough's three following matches, earning praise from manager Gareth Southgate. However, Southgate was sacked a month later and replaced by Gordon Strachan. During Strachan's era as manager at Middlesbrough, Bennett admitted to feeling down after struggling to break into the first team. He asked to leave the club on loan but his request was turned down, although he was later unsuccessfully offered to several clubs for between £150,000 to £250,000.

Strachan left Middlesbrough by mutual consent after a year and the arrival of Tony Mowbray saw Bennett become a regular in the first team, as the new manager sought Bennett to play as a more attacking full-back. A proposed loan move to Bristol City was cancelled by Mowbray and Bennett was restored to the first team. He signed a new four-and-a-half-year deal in January 2011, extending his stay until June 2015, and made 28 consecutive starts under the new manager, the longest run of any player, until he was forced to miss several games after contracting mumps. At the end of the season, Bennett won the club's Young Player of the Year award. He credited Mowbray with his improved form, commenting "without him I wouldn't be where I am now."

=== Aston Villa ===
On 29 August 2012, after making 92 appearances for Middlesbrough in four years, Bennett completed a transfer to Premier League club Aston Villa for a fee of £3 million, with potential add-ons rising to £4.25 million. He made his debut on 22 September 2012, coming on as a substitute for Eric Lichaj during a 4–1 defeat against Southampton. In his first season, Bennett made 30 appearances in all competitions for Villa and received praise from manager Paul Lambert as the club suffered a difficult season, finishing 15th. Lambert praised Bennett for not hiding but stated his belief that the club needed to sign a player to "put pressure" on Bennett to improve, eventually adding Antonio Luna from Spanish side Sevilla to the squad.

In his second season, Bennett struggled to break into the first team, with increased competition from Luna and new signing Ryan Bertrand and persistent injury problems, missing three months with a persistent back problem and later suffering from tendinitis in his knee. He made two appearances in the League Cup in the opening months of the season but did not make another appearance for Villa until 8 February 2014, when he replaced Bertrand during a 2–0 defeat to West Ham United. Three days later, he made his first league start of the season, playing in an unfamiliar left midfield role during a 0–0 draw with Cardiff City. He made just seven appearances in all competitions during the season.

==== Loan spells ====
Having lost his place in the first team to Aly Cissokho, on 21 August 2014, Bennett joined Championship side Brighton & Hove Albion on a season-long loan, with Brighton manager Sami Hyypiä describing him as "a dynamic left-back who's very comfortable on the ball." He made his debut for the club in a 2–1 victory over Bolton Wanderers on 23 August 2014. Following his arrival, Bennett described how he was "loving playing" under Hyypiä's attacking style of play and revealed that he had removed himself from social network site Twitter having been subject to abuse from Aston Villa fans. In January 2015, Bennett stated that he was open to signing for the club on a permanent basis. Bennett made 42 appearances in all competitions for Brighton, featuring in more matches than any other player at the club, before returning to Villa at the end of the season.

Bennett began the 2015–16 season with Villa, scoring his first goal for the club in a 5–3 victory against Notts County in the League Cup on 25 August 2015. Despite initially hoping to return to the first team under new manager Tim Sherwood, he was loaned to newly promoted A.F.C. Bournemouth on an initial six-month loan deal on the final day of the summer transfer window, signing a one-year contract extension with Villa prior to his departure. Signed as cover following injuries sustained by Tyrone Mings and Charlie Daniels, Bennett was described by manager Eddie Howe as possessing "everything the modern day left-back needs." However, he failed to make an appearance for the side and suffered an achilles injury after a month resulting in his return to Villa in January 2016.

He then joined Sheffield Wednesday on 19 January 2016 for the rest of the season. He made his debut against Shrewsbury Town on 30 January, where Wednesday were knocked out of the FA Cup in a 3–2 defeat. He went on to make four appearances as Wednesday made the play-offs, losing in the final against Hull City. On his return to Villa, Bennett was informed by manager Roberto Di Matteo that he was not part of his first team plans, leading Bennett to enter into talks over a permanent move over to Hillsborough. The move was later blocked by new Villa owner, Tony Xia, which he insisted was for financial reasons, with Xia believed to be unhappy over the terms of the deal which included subsidising Bennett's wages, and to avoid selling a player to a divisional rival.

=== Cardiff City ===
On 27 August 2016, Bennett joined fellow Championship side Cardiff City on a free transfer. After suffering a calf injury, Bennett was forced to wait two months before making his debut in a 2–1 Severnside derby victory against Bristol City on 14 October. His first goal for Cardiff came on 18 March 2017, in a 3–1 win over Ipswich Town and he concluded the season, with a brace against Huddersfield Town on the final day.

During the summer of 2017, fellow Championship side Fulham met a release clause in Bennett's contract. However, he rejected the move to stay in the Welsh capital, with manager Neil Warnock confirming that Fulham's offer contained a significant wage increase. His first goal of the season came at Reading on 11 December. He was sent off following two yellow cards in an FA Cup match against Manchester City on 28 January. Bennett later issued a public apology for the first bookable tackle on Leroy Sané, which left the opposition player injured, following backlash from fans on social media and pundits. Former referee Mark Halsey described the foul as a "potential leg-breaking tackle." Cardiff manager Neil Warnock made Bennett train alone after the incident as punishment and was left out of the first team following the arrival of loan signing Armand Traoré but was eventually restored to the side by Warnock. During the 2017–18 season, Bennett helped the club win promotion to the Premier League after finishing as runners-up in the Championship, making 40 appearances in all competitions. At the end of the season, he was handed a new three-year contract with the club.

Ahead of the 2018–19 season, Cardiff signed fellow left-back Greg Cunningham from Preston North End to provide competition for Bennett. He described Cunningham's arrival as "motivation" to him, with the pair sharing the role in the opening months of the campaign. Three days prior to a match against Arsenal in January 2019, Bennett's father suddenly died. Electing to play in the match, Bennett played the full 90 minutes in a match described as "emotionally charged" in the first fixture since the disappearance of Cardiff's new signing Emiliano Sala in a plane crash. He finished the campaign having made 30 appearances in the Premier League as Cardiff suffered relegation to the Championship.

=== Wigan Athletic ===
On 31 August 2021, Bennett joined League One club Wigan Athletic on a two-year deal following his release from Cardiff. Bennett made his Wigan debut on Tuesday 30 November, playing 68 minutes against Accrington Stanley in Round 2 of the Papa John's Trophy. Wigan won the fixture decided by a penalty shootout after the game finished 1–1 after 90 minutes.

=== Oxford United ===
Bennett signed for Oxford United on 30 November 2023, having left Wigan Athletic in the summer. He made his debut for the club on 5 December, in a 1–0 win against Forest Green Rovers in the EFL Trophy. He made his league debut on 9 December, coming on as a substitute for Jordan Thorniley in the 69th minute, in a 3–0 defeat to Peterborough United. On 10 January 2024, Bennett signed a contract extension with the club until the end of the season.

=== Walton & Hersham ===
In October 2025, Bennett agreed to join Southern League Premier Division South side, Walton & Hersham. He returned to the club in March 2026.

== International career ==
Bennett was part of the England under-19 squad at the 2009 European Championships in Ukraine in the summer of 2009. After featuring as a substitute in England's opening two group matches, draws with Switzerland and hosts Ukraine, Bennett was named in the starting lineup for his side's final group match, a 7–1 victory over Slovenia. He remained in the starting lineup for England's semifinal victory over France and their defeat to Ukraine in the final. He was due to participate in the 2009 FIFA U-20 World Cup but did not because of club commitments.

Bennett received his first call up for the England under-21 side after a series of impressive first team performances for Middlesbrough on 2 February 2011. He went into the squad for the game against Italy U21s, making his debut in the match as England suffered a 1–0 defeat. In May 2011, he was named in England's provisional 40-man squad for the 2011 UEFA European Under-21 Championship but was omitted from the final selection. He won his third and final cap for the under-21 side in a 4–1 victory over Israel in September 2011.

== Style of play ==
Bennett is regarded as an attacking full-back with impressive speed. During his career, he has played as a left wing-back and a left winger as well as a traditional full-back. Paul Fraser of The Northern Echo has described Bennett as "very quick, likes to get forward and is probably better attacking-wise than he is defensively." Bennett has stated that he likes "to get forward whenever I can" and "be involved as much as possible and get some crosses in."

== Personal life ==
Bennett and his partner Cherie have three children together.

== Career statistics ==
As of match played 6 October 2026

Appearances and goals by club, season and competition
Club	Season	League			FA Cup		League Cup		Other		Total	
Club	Season	Division	Apps	Goals	Apps	Goals	Apps	Goals	Apps	Goals	Apps	Goals
Middlesbrough	2008–09	Premier League	1	0	0	0	0	0	0	0	1	0
Middlesbrough	2009–10	Championship	12	0	0	0	1	0	0	0	13	0
Middlesbrough	2010–11	Championship	31	0	1	0	1	0	0	0	33	0
Middlesbrough	2011–12	Championship	41	1	2	0	2	0	0	0	45	1
Middlesbrough	Total		85	1	3	0	4	0	0	0	92	1
Aston Villa	2012–13	Premier League	25	0	2	0	3	0	0	0	30	0
Aston Villa	2013–14	Premier League	5	0	0	0	2	0	0	0	7	0
Aston Villa	2015–16	Premier League	0	0	0	0	1	1	0	0	1	1
Aston Villa	Total		30	0	2	0	6	1	0	0	38	1
Brighton & Hove Albion (loan)	2014–15	Championship	41	1	1	0	0	0	0	0	42	1
AFC Bournemouth (loan)	2015–16	Premier League	0	0	0	0	0	0	0	0	0	0
Sheffield Wednesday (loan)	2015–16	Championship	3	0	1	0	0	0	0	0	4	0
Cardiff City	2016–17	Championship	24	3	1	0	0	0	0	0	25	3
Cardiff City	2017–18	Championship	37	1	3	0	0	0	0	0	40	1
Cardiff City	2018–19	Premier League	30	0	1	0	0	0	0	0	31	0
Cardiff City	2019–20	Championship	44	0	4	0	0	0	2 (Note: Appearances in Championship play-offs)	0	50	0
Cardiff City	2020–21	Championship	28	1	1	0	1	0	–		30	1
Cardiff City	Total		164	5	10	0	1	0	2	0	177	5
Wigan Athletic	2021–22	League One	11	1	1	0	0	0	2 (Note: Appearances in EFL Trophy)	0	14	1
Wigan Athletic	2022–23	Championship	15	0	1	0	0	0	0	0	16	0
Wigan Athletic	Total		26	1	2	0	0	0	2	0	30	1
Oxford United	2023–24	League One	16	0	1	0	0	0	5 (Note: Two appearances in EFL Trophy, three appearances in EFL League One play-offs)	0	22	0
Oxford United	2024–25	Championship	12	0	0	0	0	0	0	0	12	0
Oxford United	Total		28	0	1	0	0	0	5	0	34	0
Walton & Hersham	2025–26	Southern League Premier Division South	14	1	—		—		1 (Note: Appearances in FA Trophy)	0	15	1
Walton & Hersham	2026–27	National League South	2	1	1	0	—		0	0	3	1
Walton & Hersham	Total		16	2	1	0	—		1	0	18	2
Career total			393	10	21	0	11	1	10	0	435	11

== Honours ==
Cardiff City

- EFL Championship second-place promotion: 2017–18

Oxford United

- EFL League One play-offs: 2024

England U19

- UEFA European Under-19 Championship runner-up: 2009

Individual

- Middlesbrough Young Player of the Year: 2010–11
