= Kieran Lloyd =

English footballer

Personal information
- Full name: Kieran David Lloyd
- Date of birth: 13 October 2002 (age 24)
- Place of birth: England
- Position: Right-back

Team information
- Current team: Llandudno

Youth career
- 2010–2019: Liverpool
- 2019–2021: Wigan Athletic

Senior career*
Years	Team	Apps	(Gls)
2021–2024	Wigan Athletic	0	(0)
2021	→ AFC Fylde (loan)	6	(0)
2022–2023	→ Chorley (loan)	0	(0)
2023–2024	→ Larne (loan)	8	(0)
2024–2025	Bala Town	29	(1)
2025	Bury		
2025–2026	Hyde United		
2026–	Llandudno	15	(1)
- * Club domestic league appearances and goals as of 07:41, 8 November 2026 (UTC)

Kieran David Lloyd (born 13 October 2002) is an English professional footballer who plays as a full-back for Cymru Premier club Llandudno.

== Career ==
A youth product of Liverpool since the age of eight, Lloyd moved to the youth academy of Wigan Athletic in January 2019. On 30 June 2021, he signed his first professional contract with Wigan Athletic. He made his professional debut with Wigan in a 1–1 (7–8) EFL Cup penalty shootout win over Hull City on 10 August 2021.

In October 2021, he joined National League North side AFC Fylde on a short-term loan deal, where he linked up with former Latics U23 coach Nick Chadwick.

In August 2024, Lloyd joined Cymru Premier club Bala Town following his release from Wigan Athletic.

In June 2025 he signed for Bury.

In June 2026 he joined Llandudno.

== Honours ==
Larne

NIFL Premiership: 2023-24
