= 2024–25 Wigan Athletic F.C. season =

93rd season in existence of Wigan Athletic FC

Wigan Athletic
2024–25 season
- Owner: Mike Danson
- Chairman: Ben Goodburn
- Head Coach: Ryan Lowe
- Stadium: Brick Community Stadium
- League One: 15th
- FA Cup: Fourth round
- EFL Cup: First round
- EFL Trophy: Round of 32
- Top goalscorer: League: Dale Taylor (11); All: Thelo Aasgaard (13)
- Highest home attendance: 15,445
- Lowest home attendance: 7,419
- Average home league attendance: 9,946
- Biggest win: Bristol Rovers 0–4 Wigan (14 September)
- Biggest defeat: Wigan 0–3 Birmingham City (4 January)
Home colours	Away colours	Third colours

The 2024–25 season was the 93rd season in the history of Wigan Athletic Football Club, and their second consecutive season in League One. In addition to the domestic league, the club also participated in the FA Cup, the EFL Cup, and the EFL Trophy.

The 2024/25 season was also the first season in which Wigan, were free from the transfer embargo that was placed upon the club by the English Football League, despite Mike Danson's takeover of the club at the start of the 2023/24 campaign.

== Transfers ==
=== In ===
Date	Pos.	Player	From	Fee	Ref.
14 June 2024 (Note: The transfer was announced on 13 June, and would become official on 14 June once the transfer window reopened)	RM	Dion Rankine (ENG)	Chelsea (ENG)	£300,000	
21 June 2024	GK	Andy Lonergan (ENG)	Everton (ENG)	Free	
15 July 2024	CB	Will Aimson (ENG)	Exeter City (ENG)	£200,000	
17 July 2024	LB	Jack Bates (ENG) (Note: Signed initially for the Under-21s)	Burnley (ENG)	Free	
17 July 2024	CM	Jack Rogers (ENG)	Burnley (ENG)	Free	
19 July 2024	CM	Tyrese Francois (AUS)	Fulham (ENG)	Free	
24 July 2024	CB	Toby Sibbick (UGA)	Heart of Midlothian (SCO)	£350,000	
1 August 2024	RB	Llyton Chapman (ENG)	Oldham Athletic (ENG)	Free	
13 August 2024	CF	Tom Costello (ENG)	Galway United (IRL)	Free	
29 August 2024	CM	Jensen Weir (ENG)	Brighton & Hove Albion (ENG)	Undisclosed	
30 August 2024	RW	Maleace Asamoah (ENG)	Fleetwood Town (ENG)	Undisclosed	
9 September 2024	RM	Finn O'Boyle (ENG)	Harrogate Town (ENG)	Free	
9 September 2024	LB	K'Marni Miller (ENG)	Guiseley (ENG)	Free	
8 November 2024	LB	Paul Dummett (ENG)	Newcastle United (ENG)	Free	
1 January 2025	RB	Josh Robinson (ENG)	Arsenal (ENG)	Undisclosed	
3 January 2025	RW	Joseph Hungbo (ENG)	Nürnberg (GER)	£250,000	
6 January 2025	CM	Tobias Brenan (ENG)	Oxford United (ENG)	Free	
11 January 2025	CB	Jon Mellish (ENG)	Carlisle United (ENG)	Undisclosed	
13 January 2025	GK	Matteo Spinelli (ENG)	Blackpool (ENG)	Free	
30 January 2025	MF	Ronan Darcy (ENG)	Crawley Town (ENG)	Undisclosed	

=== Out ===
Date	Pos.	Player	To	Fee	Ref.
14 June 2024 (Note: The transfer was announced on 3 June, and would become official on 14 June once the transfer window reopened)	CB	Ethan Mitchell (ENG)	AFC Fylde (ENG)	Undisclosed	
21 July 2024	RB	Sean Clare (ENG)	Leyton Orient (ENG)	Undisclosed	
15 August 2024	CB	Charlie Hughes (ENG)	Hull City (ENG)	Undisclosed	
4 January 2025	CF	Josh Stones (ENG)	York City (ENG)	Undisclosed	
28 January 2025	AM	Thelo Aasgaard (NOR)	Luton Town (ENG)	Undisclosed	

=== Loaned in ===
Date	Pos.	Player	From	Date until	Ref.
1 July 2024 (Note: The loan was announced on 29 May, and would officially commence on 1 July)	RW	Michael Olakigbe (ENG)	Brentford (ENG)	27 January 2025 (Note: On 27 January, Olakigbe was recalled back to Brentford)	
1 July 2024 (Note: The loan was announced on 5 June, and would officially commence on 1 July)	RB	Calvin Ramsay (SCO)	Liverpool (ENG)	3 January 2025 (Note: On 3 January, Ramsay was recalled back to Liverpool)	
25 July 2024	CF	Joe Hugill (ENG)	Manchester United (ENG)	8 January 2025 (Note: On 8 January, Hugill was recalled back to Manchester United)	
26 July 2024	RW	Silko Thomas (ENG)	Leicester City (ENG)	End of Season	
6 August 2024	LB	Luke Chambers (ENG)	Liverpool (ENG)	End of Season	
28 August 2024	CF	Dale Taylor (NIR)	Nottingham Forest (ENG)	End of Season	
5 January 2025	CF	Will Goodwin (ENG)	Oxford United (ENG)	End of Season	
17 January 2025	CM	Oliver Norburn (GRN)	Blackpool (ENG)	End of Season	
3 February 2025	RW	Owen Dale (ENG)	Oxford United (ENG)	End of Season	

=== Loaned out ===
Date	Pos.	Player	To	Date until	Ref.
23 August 2024	AM	Joe Adams (GUE)	Bradford City (ENG)	1 January 2025 (Note: On 1 January, Adams returned from his loan at Bradford due to sustaining a knee injury.)	
5 November 2024	CF	Josh Stones (ENG)	Oldham Athletic (ENG)	2 January 2025	

=== Released / Out of Contract ===
Date	Pos.	Player	Subsequent club	Join date	Ref.
30 June 2024	GK	Ben Amos (ENG)	Port Vale (ENG)	1 July 2024	
30 June 2024	LB	Dylan Dwyer (ENG)	Warrington Rylands (ENG)	1 July 2024	
30 June 2024	CF	Josh Magennis (NIR)	Exeter City (ENG)	1 July 2024	
30 June 2024	CF	Joe Rodwell-Grant (ENG)	Warrington Town (ENG)	1 July 2024	
30 June 2024	CF	Charlie Wyke (ENG)	Carlisle United (ENG)	1 July 2024	
30 June 2024	LB	Tom Pearce (ENG)	Montréal (USA)	12 July 2024	
30 June 2024	GK	Matt Wonnacott (ENG)	Torquay United (ENG)	26 July 2024	
30 June 2024	LW	Luke Brennan (ENG)	AFC Fylde (ENG)	31 July 2024	
30 June 2024	RB	Kieran Lloyd (ENG)	Bala Town (WAL)	22 August 2024	
30 June 2024	CF	Stephen Humphrys (ENG)	Barnsley (ENG)	30 August 2024	
30 June 2024	CF	Youssef Chentouf (ENG)	Hendon (ENG)	5 October 2024	
30 June 2024	CF	Max McMillan (ENG)	North Ferriby (ENG)	21 October 2024	
30 June 2024	CM	Abdi Sharif (SOM)	Aberystwyth Town (WAL)	10 January 2025	
22 August 2024	LW	Jordan Jones (NIR)	Carlisle United (ENG)	27 August 2024	
10 January 2025	LB	Paul Dummett (WAL)	Carlisle United (ENG)	10 January 2025	

== Pre-season and friendlies ==
On 16 May, Wigan announced their first three pre-season friendlies, against Accrington Stanley, Chorley and Blackburn Rovers. Four days later, the Latics confirmed a pre-season training camp in Hungary. A fourth friendly was added on 28 May, versus AFC Fylde. A further two were later confirmed by the club, versus Tranmere Rovers and Barrow.

Win Draw Loss Fixtures

13 July 2024 Friendly	Accrington Stanley	1–4	Wigan Athletic	Accrington
14:00 BST	Knowles 60'	Report	Adams 17'; Aasgaard 70', 86'; Rankine 73'	Stadium: Crown Ground; Attendance: 963
Note: 2x 60min matches

19 July 2024 Friendly	Chorley	0–0	Wigan Athletic	Chorley
19:30 BST		Report		Stadium: Victory Park; Attendance: 1,559

20 July 2024 Friendly	AFC Fylde	0–4	Wigan Athletic	Medlar-with-Wesham
15:00 BST		Report	Aasgaard 2', 47'; Smith 32'; Rankine 54'	Stadium: Mill Farm Sports Village; Attendance: 1,011

27 July 2024 Friendly	Wigan Athletic	1–1	Blackburn Rovers	Wigan
15:00 BST	Aasgaard 79'	Report	Vale 64'	Stadium: Brick Community Stadium; Attendance: 4,094

2 August 2024 Friendly	Tranmere Rovers	2–1	Wigan Athletic	Birkenhead
19:30 BST	Norris 23' (pen.); Walker 70'	Report	Hugill 36'	Stadium: Prenton Park

3 August 2024 Friendly	Barrow	1–0	Wigan Athletic	Barrow-in-Furness
15:00 BST	Acquah 68'	Report		Stadium: Holker Street; Attendance: 1,538

== Competitions ==
=== Overall record ===
Competition	First match	Last match	Starting round	Final position	Record							
Competition	First match	Last match	Starting round	Final position	Pld	W	D	L	GF	GA	GD	Win %
League One	10 August 2024	3 May 2025	Matchday 1	15th	46	13	17	16	40	42	−2	28.26
FA Cup	2 November 2024	8 February 2025	First round	Fourth Round	4	3	0	1	7	3	+4	75.00
EFL Cup	13 August 2024	13 August 2024	First Round	First round	1	0	1	0	1	1	+0	0.00
EFL Trophy	3 September 2024	10 December 2024	Group stage	Round of 32	4	1	1	2	5	5	+0	25.00
Total					55	17	19	19	53	51	+2	30.91

Last updated: 3 May 2025

== League table ==
Pos	Team	Pld	W	D	L	GF	GA	GD	Pts
13	Rotherham United	46	16	11	19	54	59	−5	59
14	Stevenage	46	15	12	19	42	50	−8	57
15	Wigan Athletic	46	13	17	16	40	42	−2	56
16	Exeter City	46	15	11	20	49	65	−16	56
17	Mansfield Town	46	15	9	22	60	73	−13	54

Source: EFL Official Website
Rules for classification: 1) Points; 2) Goal difference; 3) Number of goals scored; 4) Head-to-head results; 5) Wins; 6) Away goals; 7) Penalty points (sec 9.5); 8) 12-point sending off offences

== Results summary ==
Overall								Home						Away					
Pld	W	D	L	GF	GA	GD	Pts	W	D	L	GF	GA	GD	W	D	L	GF	GA	GD
46	13	17	16	40	42	−2	56	7	7	9	20	23	−3	6	10	7	20	19	+1

Last updated: 3 May 2025.
Source: Soccerstats

== Results by round ==
Round	1	2	3	4	6	7	5^{1}	8	9	10	12	13	14	15	17	11^{2}	18	19	20	21	22	23	25	27	16^{3}	28	29	30	32	26^{5}	33	24^{4}	34	35	36	37	39	40	41	31^{6}	42	43	44	45	38^{7}	46
Ground	H	A	H	A	A	A	H	H	H	A	A	H	A	H	A	H	A	H	A	H	A	A	H	A	H	H	A	H	H	A	A	H	H	A	H	A	H	H	A	A	H	A	H	H	A	A
Result	L	L	W	L	W	D	D	D	W	D	L	L	D	L	W	W	L	L	W	D	W	L	L	W	L	W	L	D	L	D	D	W	L	D	W	L	D	L	D	D	D	W	W	D	D	D
Position	22	22	▲4 (18)	▼3 (21)	▲6 (15)	▲1 (14)	14	▼2 (16)	▲2 (14)	▼1 (15)	▼2 (17)	▼1 (18)	▼1 (19)	19	▲2 (17)	▲2 (15)	▼1 (16)	▼2 (18)	▲2 (16)	▼1 (17)	▲3 (14)	▼2 (16)	▼1 (17)	17	17	▲1 (16)	16	16	▼2 (18)	▲2 (16)	16	▲2 (14)	▼1 (15)	15	15	▼2 (17)	▼1 (18)	18	▼1 (19)	▲1 (18)	▲1 (17)	▲1 (16)	▲1 (15)	▼1 (16)	▲1 (15)	15
Points	0	0	3	3	6	7	8	9	12	13	13	13	14	14	17	20	20	20	23	24	27	27	27	30	30	33	33	34	34	35	36	39	39	40	43	43	44	44	45	46	47	50	53	54	55	56

Updated to match(es) played on 3 May 2025. Source: EFL
A = Away; H = Home; W = Win; D = Draw; L = Loss; P = Postponed
Notes:
- ^{1} Matchday 5 (vs. Stevenage) was postponed due to international call-ups.
- ^{2} Matchday 11 (vs. Northampton Town) was postponed due to international call-ups.
- ^{3} Matchday 16 (vs. Burton Albion) was postponed due to international call-ups.
- ^{4} Matchday 24 (vs. Huddersfield Town) was postponed due to severe localised flooding.
- ^{5} Matchday 26 (vs. Crawley Town) was postponed due to Wigan involved in the FA cup.
- ^{6} Matchday 31 (vs. Exeter City) was postponed due to both teams involvement in the FA cup.
- ^{7} Matchday 38 (Vs Burton Albion) was postponed due to international callups.

== League One ==
On 26 June, the League One fixtures were announced.

Win Draw Loss Postponed

10 August 2024 1	Wigan Athletic	0–1	Charlton Athletic	Wigan
17:30 BST	Hughes (yellow card) 78'	Report	Jones 81'; Anderson (yellow card) 88'	Stadium: Brick Community Stadium; Attendance: 9,564; Referee: Adam Herczeg

17 August 2024 2	Reading	2–0	Wigan Athletic	Reading
15:00 BST	Savage 7'; Ehibhatiomhan 57'	Report	Kerr (yellow card) 40'; Aimson (yellow card) 71'; Sze (yellow card) 74'	Stadium: Madejski Stadium; Attendance: 12,689; Referee: Josh Smith

24 August 2024 3	Wigan Athletic	1–0	Crawley Town	Wigan
15:00 BST	Mukena 30' (o.g.); Tickle (yellow card) 83'; McManaman (yellow card) 89'	Report	Flint (yellow card) 3'; Darcy (yellow card) 88'	Stadium: Brick Community Stadium; Attendance: 8,432; Referee: Keith Stroud

31 August 2024 4	Birmingham City	2–1	Wigan Athletic	Bordesley
15:00 BST	May 18'; Wright 90+1'	Report	Aasgaard 66'; Tickle (yellow card) 69'; Kerr (yellow card) 82'; McManaman (yellow card) 90+3'	Stadium: St Andrew's; Attendance: 26,136; Referee: Sunny Singh Gill

14 September 2024 6	Bristol Rovers	0–4	Wigan Athletic	Horfield
15:00 BST	Moore (red card) 84'	Report	Hugill 20', 40'; Aasgaard (yellow card) 44', (goal) 50'; Chambers 71'	Stadium: Memorial Stadium; Attendance: 7,925; Referee: Scott Jackson

21 September 2024 7	Lincoln City	0–0	Wigan Athletic	Lincoln
12:30 BST	Jackson (yellow card) 45'; Darikwa (yellow card) 84'	Report	Carragher (yellow card) 51'	Stadium: Sincil Bank; Attendance: 8,534; Referee: Craig Hicks
Note: Fixture was initially scheduled for a 15:00 kick-off, but was moved for live Sky Sports broadcast.

24 September 2024 5	Wigan Athletic	0–0	Stevenage	Wigan
19:45 BST	McManaman (yellow card) 14'; S.Smith (yellow card) 58'; Adeeko (yellow card) 87'	Report	Piergianni (yellow card) 17'; L. Thompson (yellow card) 37'; N. Thompson (yellow card) 66'; White (yellow card) 90+3'	Stadium: Brick Community Stadium; Attendance: 7,419; Referee: Ben Toner
Note: Fixture was originally scheduled for 7 September, but was postponed due to international call-ups.

28 September 2024 8	Wigan Athletic	0–0	Exeter City	Wigan
15:00 GMT		Report	Richards (yellow card) 38'; McMillan (yellow card) 90+3'	Stadium: Brick Community Stadium; Attendance: 8,837; Referee: Scott Simpson

1 October 2024 9	Wigan Athletic	3–0	Peterborough United	Wigan
19:45 GMT	Taylor 11', 49'; Adeeko (yellow card) 56'; Thomas (yellow card) 65'; McManaman 81'; Kerr (yellow card) 90+1'	Report	Kyprianou (yellow card) 23'; Curtis (yellow card) 25'; Dornelly (yellow card) 59'; Fernandez (yellow card) 71'	Stadium: Brick Community Stadium; Attendance: 7,894; Referee: Andy Davies

5 October 2024 10	Stockport County	0–0	Wigan Athletic	Edgeley
15:00 BST	Barry (yellow card) 37'; Pye (yellow card) 59'; Camps (yellow card) 65'	Report	Carragher (yellow card) 14'; Aimson (yellow card) 76'; S.Smith (yellow card) 90+3'	Stadium: Edgeley Park; Attendance: 9,995; Referee: Carl Brook

19 October 2024 12	Cambridge United	2–0	Wigan Athletic	Cambridge
15:00 BST	Kachunga 5', (yellow card) 74'; Tickle 22' (o.g.); Andrew (yellow card) 47'; Bennett (yellow card) 61'; Reyes (yellow card) 85'; K.Smith (yellow card) 86'	Report	S.Smith (yellow card) 73'; Miller (yellow card) 83'	Stadium: Abbey Stadium; Attendance: 7,000; Referee: Ruebyn Ricardo

22 October 2024 13	Wigan Athletic	1–2	Mansfield Town	Wigan
19:45 BST	Aasgaard 53'	Report	Evans 29'; Akins (yellow card) 36'; Baccus 62', (yellow card) 82'; Cargill (yellow card) 90+2'	Stadium: Brick Community Stadium; Attendance: 9,460; Referee: Daniel Middleton

28 October 2024 14	Blackpool	2–2	Wigan Athletic	Blackpool
20:00 GMT	Carey (yellow card) 32'; Kerr 45+1' (o.g.); Casey (yellow card) 61'; Aimson 90+2' (o.g.)	Report	Rankine 20', (yellow card) 56'; M.Smith 41'; Francois (yellow card) 50'; Thomas (yellow card) 69'	Stadium: Bloomfield Road; Attendance: 10,226; Referee: Farai Hallam
Note: Fixture was initially scheduled for 26 October, but was moved for live Sky Sports broadcast.

9 November 2024 15	Wigan Athletic	0–1	Wycombe Wanderers	Wigan
15:00 GMT	Robinson (yellow card) 56'; Aimson (yellow card) 63'	Report	Low 11'; Taylor (yellow card) 26'; Scowen (yellow card) 45'	Stadium: Brick Community Stadium; Attendance: 8,958; Referee: Bobby Madley

23 November 2024 17	Barnsley	0–1	Wigan Athletic	Barnsley
15:00 GMT	Pines (yellow card) 61'; Connell (yellow card) 65'	Report	Aasgaard 42'; Sibbick (yellow card) 64'; S.Smith (yellow card) 66'; Robinson (yellow card) 90+7'	Stadium: Oakwell; Attendance: 11,438; Referee: Tom Reeves

26 November 2024 11	Wigan Athletic	2–1	Northampton Town	Wigan
19:45 GMT	Aasgaard 11'; J. Smith 18'; M. Smith (yellow card) 79'	Report	Guthrie (yellow card) 48'; Eaves 56'	Stadium: Brick Community Stadium; Attendance: 7,754; Referee: Aaron Bannister
Note: Fixture was originally scheduled for 12 October, but was postponed due to international call-ups.

3 December 2024 18	Huddersfield Town	1–0	Wigan Athletic	Huddersfield
20:00 GMT	Turton 53'; Lonwijk (yellow card) 56'; Ruffels (yellow card) 69'	Report	M. Smith (yellow card) 11'; Aimson (yellow card) 16'; Weir (yellow card) 71'; Maloney (yellow card)	Stadium: John Smiths Stadium; Attendance: 17,036; Referee: Scott Oldham
Note: Fixture was initially scheduled for a 19:45, but was moved for live Sky Sports broadcast.

7 December 2024 19	Wigan Athletic	0–2	Leyton Orient	Wigan
12:30 GMT	McManaman (yellow card) 49'	Report	Ball (yellow card) 32'; Sweeney 41'; Jaiyesimi 90+2'	Stadium: Brick Community Stadium; Referee: Carl Brook
Note: Fixture was initially scheduled for a 19:45, but was moved for live Sky Sports broadcast.

14 December 2024 20	Bolton Wanderers	0–2	Wigan Athletic	Horwich
12:30 GMT	Johnston (yellow card) 9'; Santos (yellow card) 14'; Thomason (yellow card) 37'	Report	Taylor 18', (yellow card) 77'; M.Smith (yellow card) 20'; Sessegnon (yellow card) 26'; Aasgaard 67'; Carragher (yellow card) 72'	Stadium: Toughsheet Community Stadium; Attendance: 24,448; Referee: Adam Herczeg
Note: Fixture was initially scheduled for a 19:45, but was moved for live Sky Sports broadcast.

21 December 2024 21	Wigan Athletic	2–2	Shrewsbury Town	Wigan
15:00 GMT	Taylor 9', (yellow card) 36', (goal) 53'; M.Smith (yellow card) 79'; Adeeko (yellow card) 82'	Report	O'Reilly (yellow card) 27'; Aimson 67' (o.g.); Lloyd (yellow card) 84', (goal) 87'; Hoole (yellow card) 90'	Stadium: Brick Community Stadium; Attendance: 8,752; Referee: Thomas Parsons

26 December 2024 22	Rotherham United	0–1	Wigan Athletic	Rotherham
15:00 GMT	Rafferty (yellow card) 59'	Report	Adeeko 45+3'; Weir (yellow card) 90+3'	Stadium: AESSEAL New York Stadium; Attendance: 9,509; Referee: Martin Coy

29 December 2024 23	Wrexham	2–1	Wigan Athletic	Wrexham
15:00 GMT	Barnett 60', (yellow card) 61'; Fletcher 90+1'; McClean (yellow card) 90+2'	Report	Adeeko (yellow card) 27'; Aimson (yellow card) 77'; Hugill 79'; Weir (yellow card) 85'	Stadium: The Racecourse Ground; Attendance: 13,332; Referee: Tom Nield

4 January 2025 25	Wigan Athletic	0–3	Birmingham City	Wigan
15:00 GMT	Sibbick (yellow card) 42'; Kerr (yellow card) 79'	Report	Iwata (yellow card) 12'; May 18', 30'; Harris (yellow card) 44'; Willumsson 61'; Laird (yellow card) 90+1'	Stadium: Brick Community Stadium; Attendance: 13,485; Referee: Lee Swabey

18 January 2025 27	Stevenage	1–2	Wigan Athletic	Stevenage
15:00 GMT	Piergianni (yellow card) 35'; L. Thompson (yellow card) 54' (yellow-red card) 90+3'; Kemp 83'	Report	Goodwin (yellow card) 1'; S. Smith (yellow card) 14'; Sibbick (yellow card) 34'; Taylor 55'; Weir (red card) 73'; Aasgaard 90+5'	Stadium: Lamex Stadium; Attendance: 3,158; Referee: Jacob Miles

21 January 2025 16	Wigan Athletic	1–2	Burton Albion	Wigan
19:45 GMT	S.Smith (yellow card) 28'; Aasgaard 32'; Norburn (yellow card) 45'	Report	Dodgson (yellow card) 4'; Webster (yellow card) 8'; Böðvarsson 34'; Burrell 59'; Watt (yellow card) 78'	Stadium: Brick Community Stadium; Attendance: 7,553; Referee: Scott Oldham

25 January 2025 28	Wigan Athletic	2–0	Bristol Rovers	Wigan
15:00 GMT	Carragher 6'; Hungbo (yellow card) 32'; J. Smith 70'	Report	Wilson (yellow card) 40'; Sawyers (yellow card) 40+3'; Thomas (yellow card) 58'	Stadium: Brick Community Stadium; Attendance: 10,112; Referee: Scott Jackson

28 January 2025 29	Peterborough United	1–0	Wigan Athletic	Peterborough
19:45 GMT	Susoho 18'; Lindgren (yellow card) 43'; Johnston (yellow card) 58'; Bilokapic (yellow card) 70'	Report	Norburn (yellow card) 21'; Carragher (yellow card) 25'	Stadium: Weston Homes Stadium; Attendance: 6,136; Referee: Carl Brook

1 February 2025 30	Wigan Athletic	1–1	Lincoln City	Wigan
15:00 GMT	J. Smith 36'; S. Smith (yellow card) 44'; McHugh (yellow card) 45'; Weir (yellow card) 51'; Tickle (yellow card) 77'; Sibbick (yellow card) 89'	Report	Makama (yellow card) 20'; Collins (yellow card) 31', (penalty missed) 88', (88)	Stadium: Brick Community Stadium; Attendance: 8,606; Referee: John Mulligan

15 February 2025 32	Wigan Athletic	0–2	Stockport County	Wigan
15:00 GMT	S. Smith (yellow card) 29'	Report	Touray (yellow card) 60'; Bate 79'; Will Collar 82'	Stadium: Brick Community Stadium; Attendance: 12,347; Referee: Darren Drysdale

18 February 2025 26	Crawley Town	1–1	Wigan Athletic	Crawley
19:45 GMT	Barker 42'; John-Jules (yellow card) 63'	Report	Taylor 39'; Weir (yellow card) 45'; Dale (yellow card) 52'	Stadium: Broadfield Stadium; Attendance: 3,733; Referee: Richard Eley
Note: Fixture was initially scheduled for 11 January, but was rearranged due to FA Cup involvements.

22 February 2025 33	Wycombe Wanderers	0–0	Wigan Athletic	High Wycombe
15:00 GMT	Pattenden (yellow card) 63'; Simons (yellow card) 87'; Leahy (yellow card) 90+2'	Report	Sibbick (yellow card) 85'	Stadium: Adams Park; Attendance: 5,445; Referee: Leigh Doughty

25 February 2025 24	Wigan Athletic	2–1	Huddersfield Town	Wigan
19:45 GMT	Taylor (yellow card) 4', (goal) 15'; Dale 42'	Report	Marshall 50'; Lonwijk (yellow card) 60'; Spencer (yellow card) 74'	Stadium: Brick Community Stadium; Attendance: 10,049; Referee: Ross Joyce
Note: Fixture was originally scheduled for 1 January, but was postponed due to severe localised flooding.

1 March 2025 34	Wigan Athletic	1–2	Reading	Wigan
15:00 GMT	Kerr 59'	Report	Wareham 71'; Yiadom (yellow card) 75'; Bindon 85'	Stadium: Brick Community Stadium; Attendance: 9,402; Referee: Oliver Yates

4 March 2025 35	Mansfield Town	0–0	Wigan Athletic	Mansfield
19:45 GMT		Report	S.Smith (yellow card) 75'; Darcy (yellow card) 84'	Stadium: One Call Stadium; Attendance: 6,884; Referee: Will Finnie

8 March 2025 36	Wigan Athletic	1–0	Cambridge United	Wigan
15:00 GMT	Norburn (yellow card) 29'; Carragher (yellow card) 37'; Robinson 77'	Report	Watts (yellow card) 45'; Okedina (yellow card) 90'; Morrison (yellow card) 90+2'	Stadium: Brick Community Stadium; Attendance: 10,052; Referee: Jamie O'Connor

15 March 2025 37	Charlton Athletic	2–1	Wigan Athletic	Charlton
15:00 GMT	Godden 11', 38'	Report	Norburn (yellow card) 24'; Kerr (yellow card) 38'; Sze 84'	Stadium: The Valley; Attendance: 16,491; Referee: Graham Scott

29 March 2025 39	Wigan Athletic	1–1	Barnsley	Wigan
15:00 GMT	Dale (yellow card) 37'; Tickle (yellow card) 45+2'; Asamoah 77'; Kerr (yellow card) 83'	Report	Keillor-Dunn 8'; Jaló (yellow card) 45+2'; McCarthy (yellow card) 89'	Stadium: Brick Community Stadium; Attendance: 10,942; Referee: Seb Stockbridge

1 April 2025 40	Wigan Athletic	0–1	Bolton Wanderers	Wigan
19:45 BST	McHugh (yellow card) 24'; Dale (yellow card) 27'; S. Smith (yellow card) 64'; Aimson (yellow card) 65'; Asamoah (yellow card) 72'; McMannaman (yellow card) 90+7'; Lowe (red card)	Report	Forino 90+2'	Stadium: Brick Community Stadium; Attendance: 15,445; Referee: Farai Hallam

5 April 2025 41	Leyton Orient	0–0	Wigan Athletic	Leyton
15:00 BST	James (yellow card) 53'	Report	S.Smith (yellow card) 51'	Stadium: Brisbane Road; Attendance: 3,069; Referee: Scott Tallis

8 April 2025 31	Exeter City	1–1	Wigan Athletic	Exeter
19:45 BST	Fitzwater (yellow card) 33'; Cole 69'	Report	Weir (yellow card) 40'; Taylor 51' (pen.); S.Smith (yellow card) 65'; Adeeko (yellow card) 76'	Stadium: St James Park; Attendance: 5,382; Referee: David Rock
Note: original fixture on 8 February 2025 was postponed due to both teams FA Cup involvements.

12 April 2025 42	Wigan Athletic	0–0	Wrexham	Wigan
12:30 BST	Robinson (yellow card) 26'	Report		Stadium: Brick Community Stadium; Attendance: 14,819; Referee: Adam Herczeg

18 April 2025 43	Shrewsbury Town	0–1	Wigan Athletic	Shrewsbury
15:00 BST	Feeney (yellow card) 7'; Biggins (yellow card) 67'	Report	Aimson (yellow card) 45'; Taylor 71'	Stadium: New Meadow; Attendance: 6,338; Referee: Thomas Parsons

21 April 2025 44	Wigan Athletic	1–0	Rotherham United	Wigan
15:00 BST	Carragher 36'; Mellish (yellow card) 43'	Report	Sibley (yellow card) 34'	Stadium: Brick Community Stadium; Attendance: 9,391; Referee: Greg Rollason

26 April 2025 45	Wigan Athletic	1–1	Blackpool	Wigan
15:00 BST	Mellish 3'; McManaman (yellow card) 70'	Report	Evans (yellow card) 70', (goal) 74' (pen.)	Stadium: Brick Community Stadium; Attendance: 11,176; Referee: Matthew Russell

29 April 2025 38	Burton Albion	1–1	Wigan Athletic	Burton on Trent
19:45 BST	Burrell 57'; Bennett (yellow card) 60'	Report	Darcy 90+6'	Stadium: Pirelli Stadium; Attendance: 3,506; Referee: Darren Drysdale
Note: original fixture on 22 March was postponed, due to international callups.

3 May 2025 46	Northampton Town	1–1	Wigan Athletic	Northampton
15:00 BST	Fosu 33'	Report	Adeeko (yellow card) 24'; Carragher (yellow card) 31'; Taylor 90+6'; Aimson (red card) 90+12'	Stadium: Sixfields Stadium; Attendance: 7,591; Referee: Neil Hair

== FA Cup ==
Wigan were drawn away to Carlisle United in the first round, away to Cambridge United in the second round, away to Mansfield Town in the Third Round, and at Home to Fulham in the fourth round.

Win Draw Loss Fixtures

2 November 2024 First round	Carlisle United	0–2 (a.e.t.)	Wigan Athletic	Carlisle
15:00 GMT	Robson (red card) 14'; Neal (yellow card) 61'; Lavelle (yellow card) 87'	Report	Rankine (yellow card) 25'; Olakigbe (yellow card) 33'; S. Smith 105'; J. Smith 120+1'	Stadium: Brunton Park; Attendance: 4,532; Referee: Martin Woods

30 November 2024 Second round	Cambridge United	1–2 (a.e.t.)	Wigan Athletic	Cambridge
15:00 GMT	Loft (yellow card) 21'; Nlundulu (yellow card) 27'; Njoku 77'; Lavery (yellow card) 81'	Report	Aasgaard 85'; Asamoah (yellow card) 90'; Smith 119'	Stadium: Abbey Stadium; Referee: Zac Kennard-Kettle

14 January 2025 Third round	Mansfield Town	0–2	Wigan Athletic	Mansfield
19:45 GMT	Gregory (yellow card) 45'; Akins (yellow card) 84'		Aasgaard 48', 54'	Stadium: Field Mill; Attendance: 4,523; Referee: Alex Chilowicz
Note: Fixture was originally scheduled for 11 January, but was postponed and then rearranged for three days later due to a frozen pitch.

8 February 2025 Fourth round	Wigan Athletic	1–2	Fulham	Wigan
15:00 GMT	Robinson (yellow card) 7'; Smith 50'; McHugh (yellow card) 78'	Report	Muniz 23', 55'	Stadium: Brick Community Stadium; Attendance: 12,281; Referee: David Webb

== EFL Cup ==
On 27 June, the draw for the first round was made, with Wigan being drawn at home against Barnsley.

Win Draw Loss Fixtures

13 August 2024 First round	Wigan Athletic	1–1 (a.e.t.) (2–4 p)	Barnsley	Wigan
19:45 BST	Carragher (yellow card) 21'; Aasgaard 35' (pen.)		Yoganathan (yellow card) 17'; Pines 48'; Cotter (yellow card) 55'	Stadium: Brick Community Stadium; Attendance: 1,990; Referee: Will Finnie
	Penalties
	Aasgaard (penalty missed); Jones (penalty scored); Stones (penalty missed); McHugh (penalty scored)		Phillips (penalty scored); Connell (penalty missed); Earl (penalty scored); Watters (penalty scored); Russell (penalty scored)

== EFL Trophy ==
In the group stage, Wigan were drawn into Northern Group C alongside Carlisle United, Morecambe and Nottingham Forest U21. In the round of 32, Wigan were drawn away against Chesterfield.

=== Group stage ===
Pos	Div	Team	Pld	W	PW	PL	L	GF	GA	GD	Pts	Qualification
1	L2	Morecambe	3	2	0	0	1	7	5	+2	6	Advance to Round 2
2	L1	Wigan Athletic	3	1	1	0	1	3	2	+1	5	Advance to Round 2
3	ACA	Nottingham Forest U21	3	1	0	1	1	4	5	−1	4	
4	L2	Carlisle United	3	1	0	0	2	3	5	−2	3	

Source: EFL

Win Draw Loss Fixtures

3 September 2024 Group stage	Wigan Athletic	1–2	Morecambe	Wigan
19:00 BST	Hugill 63' (pen.); McHugh (yellow card) 80'; Smith (yellow card) 90+1'	Report	Macadam 12', (yellow card) 66'; Angol (yellow card) 42', (goal) 65'; Tollitt (yellow card) 70'	Stadium: Brick Community Stadium; Attendance: 1,702; Referee: Jacob Miles

8 October 2024 Group stage	Carlisle United	0–2	Wigan Athletic	Carlisle
19:00 BST		Report	Stones 7' (pen.); Olakigbe 23'; Smith (yellow card) 32'; Thomas (yellow card) 68'	Stadium: Brunton Park; Attendance: 1,117; Referee: Steven Copeland

12 November 2024 Group stage	Wigan Athletic	0–0 (3–0 p)	Nottingham Forest U21	Wigan
19:00 GMT	Hugill (yellow card) 43'; Asamoah (yellow card) 66'; Miller (yellow card) 80'; Sze (yellow card) 90'	Report	Perry (yellow card) 13'; Back (yellow card) 78'	Stadium: Brick Community Stadium; Attendance: 1,449; Referee: Scott Tallis
	Penalties
	Thomas (penalty scored); Smith (penalty scored); Aimson (penalty scored)		(penalty missed) Nadin; (penalty missed) Sinclair; (penalty missed) McAdam

=== Knoutout stages ===
10 December 2024 Round of 32	Chesterfield	3–2	Wigan Athletic	Chesterfield
19:00 GMT	Dobra 3', (yellow card) 38'; Horton (yellow card) 65'; Berry 78' (pen.); Grigg (yellow card) 83'; Markanday 87'	Report	McManaman 19'; Sze (yellow card) 24'; Smith (yellow card) 83'; Hugill 90+1'	Stadium: SMH Group Stadium; Attendance: 1,583; Referee: Greg Rollason

== Statistics ==
=== Appearances and goals ===
As of 3 May 2025

Players with no appearances are not included on the list
’’Italics’’ indicate a loaned in player

No.	Pos	Nat	Player	Total		League One		FA Cup		EFL Cup		EFL Trophy	
No.	Pos	Nat	Player	Apps	Goals	Apps	Goals	Apps	Goals	Apps	Goals	Apps	Goals
1	GK	(England) ENG	Sam Tickle	51	0	46+0	0	4+0	0	1+0	0	0+0	0
2	DF	(England) ENG	Jon Mellish	21	1	15+6	1	0+0	0	0+0	0	0+0	0
3	DF	(England) ENG	Luke Chambers	13	1	12+0	1	0+0	0	1+0	0	0+0	0
4	DF	(England) ENG	Will Aimson	48	0	42+1	0	2+0	0	1+0	0	2+0	0
5	DF	(England) ENG	Steven Sessegnon	15	0	12+1	0	2+0	0	0+0	0	0+0	0
6	MF	(England) ENG	Jensen Weir	35	0	24+9	0	2+0	0	0+0	0	0+0	0
7	MF	(England) ENG	Dion Rankine	26	1	13+7	1	2+0	0	1+0	0	1+2	0
8	MF	(England) ENG	Matt Smith	26	1	17+2	1	1+1	0	1+0	0	2+2	0
10	MF	(England) ENG	Ronan Darcy	14	1	8+5	1	0+1	0	0+0	0	0+0	0
11	FW	(England) ENG	Owen Dale	18	1	15+2	1	0+1	0	0+0	0	0+0	0
12	GK	(England) ENG	Tom Watson	4	0	0+0	0	0+0	0	0+0	0	4+0	0
14	MF	(England) ENG	Chris Sze	16	1	2+10	1	0+0	0	1+0	0	1+2	0
15	DF	(Scotland) SCO	Jason Kerr	48	1	44+0	1	4+0	0	0+0	0	0+0	0
16	MF	(Republic of Ireland) IRL	Baba Adeeko	36	1	23+8	1	2+0	0	1+0	0	2+0	0
17	DF	(Uganda) UGA	Toby Sibbick	40	1	22+10	1	4+0	0	0+0	0	4+0	0
18	FW	(England) ENG	Jonny Smith	41	5	19+16	2	2+2	3	0+0	0	1+1	0
19	DF	(Scotland) SCO	Luke Robinson	28	1	12+11	1	3+1	0	0+0	0	1+0	0
20	FW	(England) ENG	Callum McManaman	30	2	2+24	1	0+2	0	0+0	0	2+0	1
21	MF	(Wales) WAL	Scott Smith	46	1	18+20	0	3+1	1	0+1	0	2+1	0
23	DF	(Malta) MLT	James Carragher	40	2	26+7	2	1+1	0	1+0	0	4+0	0
24	MF	(England) ENG	Harry McHugh	19	0	4+10	0	0+2	0	0+1	0	2+0	0
25	MF	(Grenada) GRN	Oliver Norburn	14	0	12+2	0	0+0	0	0+0	0	0+0	0
27	MF	(England) ENG	Kai Payne	6	0	0+2	0	0+0	0	0+0	0	3+1	0
28	FW	(Northern Ireland) NIR	Dale Taylor	47	10	36+7	10	4+0	0	0+0	0	0+0	0
29	FW	(England) ENG	Silko Thomas	31	0	20+4	0	1+2	0	0+1	0	2+1	0
30	DF	(England) ENG	Jack Reilly	1	0	0+0	0	0+0	0	0+0	0	0+1	0
35	MF	(Australia) AUS	Tyrese Francois	7	0	4+1	0	1+0	0	0+0	0	1+0	0
37	FW	(England) ENG	Maleace Asamoah	21	1	10+6	1	1+1	0	0+0	0	1+2	0
41	DF	(England) ENG	K'Marni Miller	4	0	0+2	0	0+0	0	0+0	0	1+1	0
42	FW	(England) ENG	Will Goodwin	8	0	2+4	0	0+2	0	0+0	0	0+0	0
44	FW	(England) ENG	Joseph Hungbo	11	0	5+6	0	0+0	0	0+0	0	0+0	0
Player(s) who featured whilst on loan but returned to parent club during the season:
2	DF	(Scotland) SCO	Calvin Ramsay	12	0	3+5	0	0+1	0	1+0	0	1+1	0
9	FW	(England) ENG	Joe Hugill	18	5	8+5	3	0+1	0	1+0	0	2+1	2
11	FW	(England) ENG	Michael Olakigbe	18	1	7+6	0	2+0	0	0+0	0	2+1	1
Player(s) who featured but departed the club permanently during the season:
6	DF	(England) ENG	Charlie Hughes	1	0	0+1	0	0+0	0	0+0	0	0+0	0
10	MF	(Norway) NOR	Thelo Aasgaard	31	13	23+3	9	3+0	3	1+0	1	0+1	0
25	FW	(England) ENG	Josh Stones	6	1	0+3	0	0+0	0	0+1	0	2+0	1
44	FW	(Northern Ireland) NIR	Jordan Jones	3	0	0+2	0	0+0	0	0+1	0	0+0	0
45	DF	(Wales) WAL	Paul Dummett	5	0	0+3	0	0+0	0	0+0	0	1+1	0
