= 2023–24 Wigan Athletic F.C. season =

92nd season in existence of Wigan Athletic FC

Wigan Athletic
2023–24 season
- Owner: Mike Danson
- Manager: Shaun Maloney
- Stadium: DW Stadium
- League One: 12th
- FA Cup: Third round
- EFL Cup: First round
- EFL Trophy: Round of 16
- Highest home attendance: 22,870 vs Manchester United, FA Cup, 8 January 2024
- Lowest home attendance: 1,600 vs Fleetwood Town, EFL Trophy, 10 October 2023
- Average home league attendance: 10,441
- Biggest win: 7–1 vs Leicester City U21 (H), EFL Trophy, 19 September 2023
- Biggest defeat: 1–4 vs Bristol Rovers (A), League One, 23 September 2023
Home colours	Away colours	Third colours

The 2023–24 season is the 92nd season in the history of Wigan Athletic and their first season back in League One since the 2021–22 season following their relegation in the previous season. The club are participating in League One, the FA Cup, the EFL Cup, and the 2023–24 EFL Trophy.

== Transfers ==
=== In ===
Date	Pos	Name	Previous club	Fee	Ref.
30 June 2023	FW	(England) Jonny Smith	(England) Burton Albion	Free Transfer	
30 June 2023	FW	(England) Callum McManaman	(England) Tranmere Rovers	Free Transfer	
1 July 2023	MF	(England) Matt Smith	(England) Arsenal	Free Transfer	
11 July 2023	DF	(England) Sean Clare	(England) Charlton Athletic	Free Transfer	
26 August 2023	DF	(England) Steven Sessegnon	(England) Fulham	Free Transfer	
26 September 2023	FW	(England) Max McMillan ‡	(England) Fleetwood Town	Free Transfer	

‡ Signed initially for the Under-21s

=== Out ===
Date	Pos	Name	Transferred To	Fee	Ref.
16 June 2023	FW	(Republic of Ireland) Anthony Scully	(England) Portsmouth	Undisclosed	
21 June 2023	MF	(England) Tom Naylor	(England) Chesterfield	Undisclosed	
28 June 2023	MF	(Scotland) Graeme Shinnie	(Scotland) Aberdeen	Undisclosed	
30 June 2023	DF	(England) Joe Bennett	(England) Oxford United	Released	
30 June 2023	DF	(Sierra Leone) Steven Caulker	(Spain) FC Málaga City	Released	
30 June 2023	MF	(Jamaica) Jordan Cousins	(England) Cambridge United	Released	
30 June 2023	DF	(Zimbabwe) Tendayi Darikwa	(Cyprus) Apollon Limassol	Free Transfer	
30 June 2023	FW	(Wales) Gwion Edwards	(England) Morecambe	Released	
30 June 2023	GK	(England) Jamie Jones	(England) Middlesbrough	End of Contract	
30 June 2023	DF	(Namibia) Ryan Nyambe	(England) Derby County	Released	
30 June 2023	MF	(England) Max Power	(Saudi Arabia) Al Qadsiah FC	End of Contract	
30 June 2023	DF	(Jamaica) Curtis Tilt	(England) Salford City	Free Transfer	
14 July 2023	FW	(Republic of Ireland) Will Keane	(England) Preston North End	Undisclosed	
27 July 2023	MF	(Republic of Ireland) Jamie McGrath	(Scotland) Aberdeen	Contract Terminated	
27 July 2023	DF	(England) Jack Whatmough	(England) Preston North End	Contract Terminated	
4 August 2023	MF	(Republic of Ireland) James McClean	(Wales) AFC Wrexham	Undisclosed	
29 January 2024	FW	(England) Callum Lang	(England) Portsmouth	Undisclosed	

Retained List=

=== Loans In ===
Date	Pos	Name	Previous club	End Date	Ref.
27 June 2023	DF	(Scotland) Liam Morrison	(Germany) Bayern Munich	End of season	
19 July 2023	MF	(England) James Balagizi	(England) Liverpool	4 January 2024	
22 July 2023	MF	(England) Liam Shaw	(Scotland) Celtic	End of season	
27 July 2023	DF	(England) Kelland Watts	(England) Newcastle United	End of season	
1 September 2023	FW	(England) Martial Godo	(England) Fulham	End of season	
1 September 2023	DF	(Tunisia) Omar Rekik	(England) Arsenal	1 January 2024	
11 January 2024	DF	(England) Luke Chambers	(England) Liverpool	End of season	
22 January 2024	DF	(England) Charlie Goode	(England) Brentford	End of season	
31 January 2024	FW	(United States) Charlie Kelman	(England) Queens Park Rangers	End of season	

=== Loans Out ===
Date	Pos	Name	Transferred To	Fee	Ref.
22 August 2023	DF	(Scotland) Luke Robinson	(Scotland) St Johnstone	End of season	
31 August 2023	DF	(England) Kieran Lloyd	(Northern Ireland) Larne	1 January 2024	
1 September 2023	FW	(England) Luke Brennan	(Wales) TNS	1 January 2024	
15 December 2023	FW	(England) Josh Stones	(England) Oldham Athletic	12 January 2024	
10 January 2024	DF	(England) James Carragher	(Scotland) Inverness Caledonian Thistle	End of season	
11 January 2024	MF	(England) Joe Adams	(England) Morecambe	End of season	
12 January 2024	DF	(England) Ethan Mitchell	(England) AFC Fylde	12 February 2024	
1 February 2024	MF	(England) Harry McHugh	(Scotland) Ayr United	End of season	
1 February 2024	FW	(England) Charlie Wyke	(England) Rotherham United	End of season	
17 February 2024	GK	(England) Tom Watson	(England) Oxford City	End of season	

== Pre-season and friendlies ==
The club began their pre-season with a one-week training camp in Hungary. They played a behind closed doors friendly against BFC Siófok, winning 3–2.

Win Draw Loss Fixtures

22 July 2023 Friendly	Wigan Athletic	0–1	Everton	Wigan
14:00 BST		Report	Young 64'	Stadium: DW Stadium; Attendance: 9,897 (3,949 away)

28 July 2023 Friendly	Tranmere Rovers	1–1	Wigan Athletic	Birkenhead
19:00 BST	Saunders 51'	Report	Adams 71'	Stadium: Prenton Park; Attendance: 1,616

29 July 2023 Friendly	Morecambe	0–2	Wigan Athletic	Morecambe
15:00 BST		Report	Aasgaard 18'; Brennan 90+2'	Stadium: Mazuma Stadium

== Competitions ==
=== Overall record ===
Competition	First match	Last match	Starting round	Final position	Record							
Competition	First match	Last match	Starting round	Final position	Pld	W	D	L	GF	GA	GD	Win %
League One	5 August 2023	27 April 2024	Matchday 1	12th	46	20	10	16	63	56	+7	43.48
FA Cup	4 November 2023	8 January 2024	First round	3rd Round	3	2	0	1	3	0	+3	66.67
EFL Cup	8 August 2023	8 August 2023	First round	First round	1	0	1	0	0	0	+0	0.00
EFL Trophy	19 September 2023	16 January 2024	Group stage	Last 16	5	2	3	0	15	5	+10	40.00
Total					55	24	14	17	81	61	+20	43.64

Last updated: 27 April 2024

== Table ==
2023–24 EFL League One

Pos	Team	Pld	W	D	L	GF	GA	GD	Pts
9	Stevenage	46	19	14	13	57	46	+11	71
10	Wycombe Wanderers	46	17	14	15	60	55	+5	65
11	Leyton Orient	46	18	11	17	53	55	−2	65
12	Wigan Athletic	46	20	10	16	63	56	+7	62 (Note: On 19 May 2023, Wigan Athletic were deducted four points for failing to pay players and staff on time following previous EFL rules breaches in the 2022–23 season. Another four-point deduction was applied on 26 May, after the club's owners missed a deadline to deposit an amount equalling 125% of its monthly wage bill.)
13	Exeter City	46	17	10	19	46	61	−15	61
14	Northampton Town	46	17	9	20	57	66	−9	60
15	Bristol Rovers	46	16	9	21	52	68	−16	57

Source: EFL Official Website
Rules for classification: 1) Points; 2) Goal difference; 3) Number of goals scored; 4) Head-to-head results; 5) Wins; 6) Away goals; 7) Penalty points (sec 9.5); 8) 12-point sending off offences

== Results summary ==
Overall								Home						Away					
Pld	W	D	L	GF	GA	GD	Pts	W	D	L	GF	GA	GD	W	D	L	GF	GA	GD
46	20	10	16	63	56	+7	70	13	4	6	30	18	+12	7	6	10	33	38	−5

Last updated: 27 April 2024.
Source: Soccerway

== Results by round ==
Round	1	2	3	4	5	6	8	9	10	11	12	14	15	16	7^{1}	13^{2}	17	19	20	21	22	23	24	25	26	28	29	18^{3}	30	31	32	33	34	35	27^{4}	36	37	38	39	41	42	43	44	40^{5}	45	46
Ground	A	H	A	A	H	A	H	A	H	A	A	A	H	H	H	H	A	A	H	H	A	A	H	H	A	A	H	H	H	A	H	A	A	H	H	A	H	A	H	H	A	H	A	A	A	H
Result	W	W	D	W	L	L	W	L	L	L	L	W	W	W	L	W	D	D	W	D	L	L	L	W	D	D	W	W	L	W	L	L	W	D	W	L	W	L	W	D	L	D	D	W	W	W
Points (Note: Wigan were deducted eight points prior to the start of the season)	-5	-2	-1	2	2	2	5	5	5	5	5	8	11	14	14	17	18	19	22	23	23	23	23	26	27	28	31	34	34	37	37	37	40	41	44	44	47	47	50	51	51	52	53	56	59	62

A = Away; H = Home; W = Win; D = Draw; L = Loss; P = Postponed
Notes:
- ^{1} Matchday 7 (vs Charlton Athletic) was postponed due to the international call-ups.
- ^{2} Matchday 13 (vs Peterborough United) was postponed due to the international call-ups.
- ^{3} Matchday 18 (vs Wycombe Wanderers) was postponed due to international call-ups.
- ^{4} Matchday 27 (vs Bolton Wanderers) was postponed due to both teams' involvement in the FA Cup.
- ^{5} Matchday 40 (vs Charlton Athletic) was postponed due to the international call-ups.

== League One ==
On 22 June, the EFL League One fixtures were released.

Win Draw Loss Postponed

5 August 2023 1	Derby County	1–2	Wigan Athletic	Derby
15:00 BST	Forsyth 57'	Report	Wyke 37', 72'	Stadium: Pride Park; Attendance: 29,957; Referee: Scott Oldham

12 August 2023 2	Wigan Athletic	2–1	Northampton Town	Wigan
15:00 BST	Hughes 72'; McManaman 79'	Report	Hoskins 24'	Stadium: DW Stadium; Attendance: 10,095; Referee: Ross Joyce

15 August 2023 3	Carlisle United	1–1	Wigan Athletic	Carlisle
19:45 BST	Moxon 56'	Report	Wyke 34'	Stadium: Brunton Park; Attendance: 8,649; Referee: Mark Edwards

19 August 2023 4	Bolton Wanderers	0–4	Wigan Athletic	Horwich
12:30 BST		Report	Wyke 12', 75'; Humphrys 24', 45+4'	Stadium: Toughsheet Community Stadium; Attendance: 24,116; Referee: Tom Reeves

26 August 2023 5	Wigan Athletic	0–2	Barnsley	Wigan
15:00 BST		Report	Cole 26'; McAtee 90+2'	Stadium: DW Stadium; Attendance: 10,683; Referee: Seb Stockbridge

2 September 2023 6	Blackpool	2–1	Wigan Athletic	Blackpool
15:00 BST	Rhodes 4'; Dougall 90+4'	Report	Magennis 89'	Stadium: Bloomfield Road; Attendance: 11,537; Referee: Anthony Backhouse

16 September 2023 8	Wigan Athletic	2–1	Cambridge United	Wigan
15:00 BST	Humphrys 57'; Aasgaard 62'	Report	Okenabirhie 76' (pen.)	Stadium: DW Stadium; Attendance: 10,068; Referee: Adam Herczeg

23 September 2023 9	Bristol Rovers	4–1	Wigan Athletic	Bristol
15:00 BST	Thomas 13'; Hunt 26'; Collins 53'; Marquis 68'	Report	Wyke 21'	Stadium: Memorial Stadium; Attendance: 8,161; Referee: Geoff Eltringham

30 September 2023 10	Wigan Athletic	1–2	Portsmouth	Wigan
15:00 BST	Godo 27'	Report	Poole 31'; Lane 34'	Stadium: DW Stadium; Attendance: 10,358; Referee: Will Finnie

3 October 2023 11	Burton Albion	2–1	Wigan Athletic	Burton
19:45 BST	Powell 68', 84' (pen.)	Report	Hughes 44'	Stadium: Pirelli Stadium; Attendance: 2,527; Referee: Sonny Sukhvir Gill

7 October 2023 12	Stevenage	1–0	Wigan Athletic	Stevenage
15:00 BST	Pressley 9' (pen.)	Report		Stadium: Lamex Stadium; Attendance: 4,402; Referee: Alan Young

21 October 2023 14	Exeter City	0–2	Wigan Athletic	Exeter
15:00 BST		Report	Godo 8'; Aimson 90+7' (o.g.)	Stadium: St James Park; Attendance: 6,337; Referee: Ben Atkinson

24 October 2023 15	Wigan Athletic	2–0	Oxford United	Wigan
19:45 BST	Humphrys 17'; Lang 80'	Report		Stadium: DW Stadium; Attendance: 9,108; Referee: David Rock

28 October 2023 16	Wigan Athletic	2–0	Shrewsbury Town	Wigan
15:00 BST	Humphrys 35'; Lang 66'	Report		Stadium: DW Stadium; Attendance: 9,389; Referee: Daniel Middleton

31 October 2023 7	Wigan Athletic	2–3	Charlton Athletic	Wigan
19:45 GMT	Aasgaard 84'; Humphrys 90'	Report	May 21', 31'; Blackett-Taylor 43'	Stadium: DW Stadium; Attendance: 8,486; Referee: Paul Howard
Note: Fixture was previous postponed due to international call-ups.

7 November 2023 13	Wigan Athletic	2–1	Peterborough United	Wigan
19:45 GMT	Godo 7'; McManaman 82'	Report	Poku 54'	Stadium: DW Stadium; Attendance: 8,134; Referee: Ollie Yates
Note: Fixture was previously postponed due to international call-ups.

11 November 2023 17	Cheltenham Town	1–1	Wigan Athletic	Cheltenham
15:00 GMT	Sercombe 32' (pen.)	Report	Freestone 6' (o.g.); Humphrys (penalty missed) 64'	Stadium: The Completely-Suzuki Stadium; Attendance: 4,235; Referee: Carl Brook

25 November 2023 19	Leyton Orient	1–1	Wigan Athletic	Leyton
15:00 GMT	Forde 18'	Report	Humphrys (penalty missed) 1', 45+1'	Stadium: Brisbane Road; Attendance: 8,517; Referee: Sam Purkiss

28 November 2023 20	Wigan Athletic	3–0	Fleetwood Town	Wigan
19:45 GMT	Jones 4'; Lynch 31' (o.g.); Pearce 61'	Report	Earl (yellow card) 40' (yellow-red card) 45+1'	Stadium: DW Stadium; Attendance: 8,129; Referee: Edward Duckworth

9 December 2023 21	Wigan Athletic	0–0	Lincoln City	Wigan
15:00 GMT		Report		Stadium: DW Stadium; Attendance: 8,838; Referee: Charles Breakspear

16 December 2023 22	Port Vale	3–2	Wigan Athletic	Stoke-on-Trent
15:00 GMT	Chislett 23', 43', 83'	Report	Sze 63'; Wyke 77'	Stadium: Vale Park; Attendance: 6,701; Referee: Marc Edwards

23 December 2023 23	Reading	2–0	Wigan Athletic	Reading
15:00 GMT	Azeez 34'; Smith 50'	Report		Stadium: Select Car Leasing Stadium; Attendance: not given Referee: Martin Woods

26 December 2023 24	Wigan Athletic	0–1	Derby County	Wigan
15:00 GMT		Report	Nelson 19'	Stadium: DW Stadium; Attendance: 13,601; Referee: Thomas Parsons

29 December 2023 25	Wigan Athletic	2–0	Carlisle United	Wigan
19:00 GMT	Magennis 16' (pen.); Morrison 36'	Report		Stadium: DW Stadium; Attendance: 13,224; Referee: Darren Drysdale

1 January 2024 26	Barnsley	1–1	Wigan Athletic	Barnsley
15:00 GMT	Cole 45+1'	Report	J.Smith 87'	Stadium: Oakwell; Attendance: 12,836; Referee: Seb Stockbridge

13 January 2024 28	Northampton Town	1–1	Wigan Athletic	Northampton
15:00 GMT	Hoskins 16' (pen.)	Report	Magennis 64'	Stadium: Sixfields; Attendance: 6,664; Referee: Anthony Backhouse

20 January 2024 29	Wigan Athletic	1–0	Reading	Wigan
15:00 GMT	Aasgaard 32'	Report		Stadium: DW Stadium; Attendance: 9,103; Referee: Tom Reeves

23 January 2024 18	Wigan Athletic	1–0	Wycombe Wanderers	Wigan
19:45 GMT	Hughes 90+20'	Report		Stadium: DW Stadium; Attendance: 7,774; Referee: ~~Adam Herczeg~~; Steven Rushton (Note: Herczeg was replaced by fourth official Steven Rushton on 55 minutes, due to injury)
Note: original fixture on 7 November, postponed due to international call-ups.

27 January 2024 30	Wigan Athletic	2–3	Stevenage	Wigan
19:45 GMT	Magennis 5' (pen.); Aasgaard 38'	Report	Reid 15'; Piergianna 66'; Thompson 81'	Stadium: DW Stadium; Attendance: 8,804; Referee: Ben Toner

3 February 2024 31	Peterborough United	2–3	Wigan Athletic	Peterborough
15:00 GMT	Knight 90+1'; Jones 90+4'	Report	Aasgaard 20', 85'; Magennis 52'; M.Smith (yellow card) 66' (yellow-red card) 76'	Stadium: Weston Homes Stadium; Attendance: 8,184; Referee: Daniel Middleton

10 February 2024 32	Wigan Athletic	1–2	Exeter City	Wigan
15:00 GMT	Kelman 71'	Report	Eisa 10'; Aitchison 66'	Stadium: DW Stadium; Attendance: 9,431; Referee: Alex Chilowicz

13 February 2024 33	Oxford United	4–2	Wigan Athletic	Oxford
19:45 GMT	Murphy 45+3'; Brannagan 55'; Rodrigues 76'; Goodrham 90+4'	Report	Jones 41'; Aasgaard 80'	Stadium: The Kassam Stadium; Attendance: 7,320; Referee: Jeremy Simpson

17 February 2024 34	Shrewsbury Town	0–1	Wigan Athletic	Shrewsbury
15:00 GMT		Report	M.Smith 57'	Stadium: Crowd Meadow; Attendance: 7,206; Referee: Lee Swabey

23 February 2024 35	Wigan Athletic	1–1	Cheltenham Town	Wigan
19:45 GMT	Bonds 52' (o.g.)	Report	Taylor 9'	Stadium: DW Stadium; Attendance: 9,326; Referee: David Rock

27 February 2024 27	Wigan Athletic	1–0	Bolton Wanderers	Wigan
19:45 GMT	Humphrys 69'	Report		Stadium: DW Stadium; Attendance: 13,204; Referee: John Busby
Note: original fixture on 6 January was postponed, due to both teams FA Cup involvement.

2 March 2024 36	Fleetwood Town	4–2	Wigan Athletic	Fleetwood
15:00 GMT	Lawal 15', 36'; Kilkenny 54'; Stockley 61'	Report	Humphrys 17'; Aasgaard 26'	Stadium: Highbury Stadium; Attendance: 3,827; Referee: Anthony Backhouse

9 March 2024 37	Wigan Athletic	1–0	Leyton Orient	Wigan
15:00 GMT	Kerr 73'	Report	Galbraith (yellow card) 29' (yellow-red card) 42'	Stadium: DW Stadium; Attendance: 10,352; Referee: Scott Oldham

12 March 2024 38	Wycombe Wanderers	1-0	Wigan Athletic	Wycombe
19:45 GMT	Tickle 19' (o.g.)	Report		Stadium: Adams Park; Attendance: 3,568; Referee: Scott Tallis

16 March 2024 39	Wigan Athletic	1–0	Blackpool	Wigan
15:00 GMT	S. Smith 26'			Stadium: DW Stadium; Attendance: 13,964; Referee: James Linnington

29 March 2024 41	Wigan Athletic	1–1	Burton Albion	Wigan
15:00 GMT	Hughes 43' (o.g.)	Report	Brayford 54'	Stadium: DW Stadium; Attendance: 11,426; Referee: Darren Drysdale

1 April 2024 42	Cambridge United	3–1	Wigan Athletic	Cambridge
15:00 BST	Ahadme 11', 57'; Andrew 83'	Report	Magennis (penalty missed) 35'; Godo 65'	Stadium: Abbey Stadium; Attendance: 6,418; Referee: Simon Mather

6 April 2024 43	Wigan Athletic	0–0	Port Vale	Wigan
15:00 BST		Report		Stadium: DW Stadium; Attendance: 12,572; Referee: Paul Howard

9 April 2024 40	Charlton Athletic	2–2	Wigan Athletic	Charlton
19:45 BST	Hughes 19' (o.g.); Aneke 79'	Report	Kelman 62', 66'	Stadium: The Valley; Attendance: 11,169; Referee: Lee Swabey
Note: original Fixture onwas previous postponed due to international call-ups.

13 April 2024 44	Lincoln City	1–2	Wigan Athletic	Lincoln
15:00 BST	Mandroiu 40'		J. Smith 20'; Hughes 90'	Stadium: LNER Stadium; Attendance: 9,611; Referee: Martin Coy

20 April 2024 45	Portsmouth	1–2	Wigan Athletic	Portsmouth
15:00 BST	Lang (yellow card) 17'; Pack (yellow card) 62'; Yengi 85'	Report	Chambers 22'; Hughes (yellow card) 32'; Magennis 83'	Stadium: Fratton Park; Attendance: 20,202; Referee: Dean Whitestone

27 April 2024 46	Wigan Athletic	2–0	Bristol Rovers	Wigan
12:30 BST	Magennis 30'; J.Smith 48'	Report	McCormick (yellow card) 82'	Stadium: DW Stadium; Attendance: 14,077; Referee: Marc Edwards

- All fixtures are subject to change

== FA Cup ==
Wigan were drawn away to Exeter City in the first round, away to York City in the second round, and at home to Manchester United in the third round.

Win Draw Loss

4 November 2023 First Round	Exeter City	0–2	Wigan Athletic	Exeter
15:00 GMT		Report	Aasgaard 58'; Sessegnon 87'	Stadium: St James Park; Attendance: 3,512; Referee: Craig Hicks

1 December 2023 Second Round	York City	0–1	Wigan Athletic	Huntington
19:45 GMT		Report	Humphrys 61'	Stadium: York Community Stadium; Attendance: 6,613; Referee: Thomas Kirk

8 January 2024 Third Round	Wigan Athletic	0–2	Manchester United	Wigan
20:15 GMT		Report	Dalot 22'; Fernandes 74' (pen.)	Stadium: DW Stadium; Attendance: 22,870; Referee: Anthony Taylor

== EFL Cup ==
Wigan were drawn against Wrexham away in the first round.

Win Draw Loss Fixtures

8 August 2023 First round	Wrexham	0–0 (4–2 p)	Wigan Athletic	Wrexham
19:45 BST		Report		Stadium: Racecourse Ground; Attendance: 9,736; Referee: Sam Allison
	Penalties
	Young (penalty scored); Lee (penalty scored); O'Connor (penalty scored); Dalby (penalty scored)		(penalty scored) Wyke; (penalty scored) Humphrys; (penalty missed) Hughes; (penalty missed) Aasgaard

== EFL Trophy ==
The Group stage draw was finalised on 22 June 2023. Wigan were then drawn at home to Stockport County in the Second Round, and away to Doncaster Rovers in the Last 16.

Pos	Div	Team	Pld	W	PW	PL	L	GF	GA	GD	Pts	Qualification
1	L1	Wigan Athletic	3	1	2	0	0	10	4	+6	7	Advance to Round 2
2	L1	Fleetwood Town	3	2	0	1	0	9	3	+6	7	Advance to Round 2
3	ACA	Leicester City U21	3	1	0	0	2	2	11	−9	3	
4	L2	Tranmere Rovers	3	0	0	1	2	0	3	−3	1	

Updated to match(es) played on 14 November 2023. Source: EFL.com

Win Draw Loss Fixtures

19 September 2023 Group stage	Wigan Athletic	7–1	Leicester City U21	Wigan
19:00 BST	Magennis 34' (pen.), 46', 60'; Lang 57'; McHugh 72'; Sze 85'; Stones 90+5'	Report	Raikhy 30'	Stadium: DW Stadium; Attendance: 2,073; Referee: Scott Simpson

10 October 2023 Group stage	Wigan Athletic	3–3 (a.e.t.) (4–3 p)	Fleetwood Town	Wigan
19:00 BST	Humphrys 55'; Stones 65'; Pearce 87'	Report	Tshimanga 43', 45+3'; Earl 90+3'	Stadium: DW Stadium; Attendance: 1,600; Referee: Scott Tallis
	Penalties
	Lang (penalty missed); Sze (penalty scored); Pearce (penalty missed); Clare (penalty scored); Stones (penalty scored); Hughes (penalty scored)		(penalty scored) Marriott; (penalty missed) Mayor; (penalty scored) Robertson; (penalty missed) Simons; (penalty scored) Earl; (penalty missed) Broom

14 November 2023 Group stage	Tranmere Rovers	0–0 (a.e.t.) (5–6 p)	Wigan Athletic	Birkenhead
19:00 GMT		Report		Stadium: Prenton Park; Referee: Simon Mather
	Penalties
	Morris (penalty scored); Hughes (penalty scored); Jolley (penalty scored); Norris (penalty scored); Saunders (penalty missed); Taylor (penalty missed); Davies (penalty scored); Pike (penalty missed)		(penalty scored) McManaman; (penalty scored) Humphrys; (penalty scored) Pearce; (penalty scored) Sze; (penalty missed) Stones; (penalty missed) Balagizi; (penalty scored) McHugh; (penalty scored) Watts

6 December 2023 Second round	Wigan Athletic	2–0	Stockport County	Wigan
19:00 GMT	J.Smith 17'; Morrison 23'	Report		Stadium: DW Stadium; Attendance: 3,051; Referee: Sunny Sukhvir Gill

16 January 2024 Third round	Doncaster Rovers	1–1 (a.e.t.) (4–2 p)	Wigan Athletic	Doncaster
19:00 GMT	Bailey 70'	Report	Wyke 11'	Stadium: Eco-Power Stadium; Attendance: 1,530; Referee: Ollie Yates
	Penalties
	Ironside (penalty scored); Close (penalty scored); Bailey (penalty scored); Hurst (penalty scored)		Magennis (penalty scored); Humphrys (penalty scored); Hughes (penalty missed); Jones (penalty missed)

== Squad ==
As of 20 February 2024

No.	Name	Position	Nationality	Date of birth (age)	Signed from	Fee	Contract end
Goalkeepers
1	Sam Tickle	GK	(England)	31 March 2002 (age 24)	Academy	—N/a	30 June 2026
12	Ben Amos	GK	(England)	10 April 1990 (age 36)	Charlton Athletic	Free Transfer	30 June 2024
50	Matthew Wonnacott	GK	(England)	31 August 2004 (age 22)	Torquay United	Free Transfer	30 June 2024
51	Matthew Corran	GK	(England)	4 October 2005 (age 21)	Academy	—N/a	30 June 2024
Defenders
2	Kelland Watts	DF	(England)	3 November 1999 (age 27)	Newcastle United	Loan	31 May 2024
3	Tom Pearce	DF	(England)	12 April 1998 (age 28)	Leeds United	£325,000	30 June 2024
4	Liam Morrison	DF	(Scotland)	7 April 2003 (age 23)	Bayern Munich	Loan	31 May 2024
5	Steven Sessegnon	DF	(England)	18 May 2000 (age 26)	Fulham	Free Transfer	30 June 2025
6	Charlie Hughes	DF	(England)	16 October 2003 (age 23)	Academy	—N/a	30 June 2028
7	Sean Clare	DF	(England)	18 September 1996 (age 30)	Charlton Athletic	Free Transfer	30 June 2026
15	Jason Kerr	DF	(Scotland)	6 February 1997 (age 29)	St Johnstone	£700,000	30 June 2024
24	Luke Chambers	DF	(England)	24 June 2004 (age 22)	Liverpool	Loan	31 May 2024
29	Charlie Goode	DF	(England)	3 August 1995 (age 31)	Brentford	Loan	31 May 2024
44	Jack Reilly	DF	(England)	9 February 2004 (age 22)	Academy	—N/a	30 June 2024
Midfielders
8	Matt Smith	MF	(England)	5 October 2000 (age 26)	Arsenal	Free Transfer	30 June 2026
10	Thelo Aasgaard	MF	(Norway)	2 May 2002 (age 24)	Academy	—N/a	30 June 2028
16	Liam Shaw	MF	(England)	12 March 2001 (age 25)	Celtic	Loan	31 May 2024
21	Scott Smith	MF	(Wales)	7 February 2001 (age 25)	Academy	—N/a	30 June 2025
26	Baba Adeeko	MF	(Republic of Ireland)	3 April 2003 (age 23)	Academy	—N/a	30 June 2027
32	Abdi Sharif	MF	(Somalia)	1 January 2001 (age 25)	Liverpool	Free Transfer	30 June 2024
42	Harry McHugh	MF	(England)	14 October 2002 (age 24)	Academy	—N/a	30 June 2024
43	Dylan Dwyer	MF	(England)	27 November 2003 (age 22)	Tranmere Rovers	Free Transfer	30 June 2024
45	Kai Payne	MF	(England)	26 November 2004 (age 21)	Academy	—N/a	30 June 2024
Forwards
11	Stephen Humphrys	FW	(England)	15 September 1997 (age 29)	Rochdale	Undisclosed	30 June 2024
14	Jordan Jones	FW	(Northern Ireland)	24 October 1994 (age 32)	Rangers	Undisclosed	30 June 2024
17	Martial Godo	FW	(England)	14 March 2003 (age 23)	Fulham	Loan	31 May 2024
18	Jonny Smith	FW	(England)	28 July 1997 (age 29)	Burton Albion	Free Transfer	30 June 2025
20	Callum McManaman	FW	(England)	25 April 1991 (age 35)	Tranmere Rovers	Free Transfer	30 June 2024
22	Chris Sze	FW	(England)	9 December 2003 (age 22)	Academy	—N/a	30 June 2024
23	Charlie Kelman	FW	(United States)	2 November 2001 (age 25)	Queens Park Rangers	Loan	31 May 2024
28	Josh Magennis	FW	(Northern Ireland)	15 August 1990 (age 36)	Hull City	Undisclosed	30 June 2024
36	Youssef Chentouf	FW	(England)	10 February 2004 (age 22)	Rising Ballers	Free Transfer	30 June 2024
38	Joe Rodwell-Grant	FW	(England)	18 October 2002 (age 24)	Preston North End	Free Transfer	30 June 2024
Out on Loan
9	Charlie Wyke	FW	(England)	6 December 1992 (age 33)	Sunderland	Free Transfer	30 June 2024
25	Josh Stones	FW	(England)	12 November 2003 (age 23)	Guiseley	Free Transfer	30 June 2024
31	James Carragher	DF	(England)	11 November 2002 (age 24)	Academy	—N/a	30 June 2025
33	Luke Brennan	FW	(England)	19 October 2001 (age 25)	Blackburn Rovers	Free Transfer	30 June 2024
34	Luke Robinson	DF	(Scotland)	20 November 2001 (age 24)	Academy	—N/a	30 June 2024
35	Kieran Lloyd	DF	(Wales)	13 October 2002 (age 24)	Liverpool	Free Transfer	30 June 2024
37	Ethan Mitchell	DF	(England)	13 February 2003 (age 23)	Plymouth Argyle	Free Transfer	30 June 2024
40	Tom Watson	GK	(England)	27 August 2004 (age 22)	Academy	—N/a	30 June 2024
41	Joe Adams	MF	(England)	3 June 2004 (age 22)	Eastleigh	Free Transfer	30 June 2024
