= Baba Adeeko =

Irish footballer (born 2003)

Personal information
- Full name: Babajide Ezekiel Adeeko
- Date of birth: 3 April 2003 (age 23)
- Place of birth: Ballybane, Ireland
- Height: 1.75 m (5 ft 9 in)
- Position: Defensive midfielder

Team information
- Current team: Rochdale
- Number: 17

Youth career
- –2015: Mervue United
- 2015–2021: Wigan Athletic

Senior career*
Years	Team	Apps	(Gls)
2021–2026	Wigan Athletic	80	(1)
2026–	Rochdale	0	(0)

International career^{‡}
2022	Republic of Ireland U19	1	(0)
2023–2024	Republic of Ireland U21	9	(0)
- * Club domestic league appearances and goals as of 12:30, 14 August 2026 (UTC) ‡ National team caps and goals as of 19:24, 15 October 2024 (UTC)

Babajide Ezekiel Adeeko (born 3 April 2003) is an Irish professional footballer who plays as a defensive midfielder for EFL League Two side Rochdale.

== Early life ==
Born in Ireland to Nigerian parents, Adeeko grew up in the Ballybane area of Galway. He played football at local club Mervue United until the age of 13, when he moved to England with his mother. He then joined the academy at Wigan Athletic.

== Club career ==
=== Wigan Athletic ===
Adeeko signed his first professional contract with Wigan Athletic in June 2021. He made his first team debut in the 2021–22 season, appearing as a substitute against Sunderland in the EFL Cup.

He made his league debut on the opening day of the 2023–24 season, coming on as a substitute against Derby County. He made his first league start on 15 August 2023 against Carlisle United.

Adeeko scored his first goal for the club on Boxing Day 2024 against Rotherham United.

On 6 May 2026, it was announced that Adeeko had been transfer listed.

=== Rochdale ===
On 14 August 2026, Adeeko signed for League Two club Rochdale on a one-year deal.

== International career ==
In 2022, Adeeko was called up to the Republic of Ireland under-19 team for their Under-19 Championship qualifiers. He made one appearance for the team in their 4–0 win against Armenia.

In September 2023, he received his first call-up for the under-21 team, and made his debut in a 3–2 win against Turkey.

== Career statistics ==
As of match played 10 April 2025

Appearances and goals by club, season and competition
Club	Season	League			FA Cup		EFL Cup		Other		Total	
Club	Season	Division	Apps	Goals	Apps	Goals	Apps	Goals	Apps	Goals	Apps	Goals
Wigan Athletic	2021–22	League One	0	0	0	0	1	0	2 (Note: Appearances in EFL Trophy)	0	3	0
Wigan Athletic	2022–23	Championship	0	0	0	0	1	0	–		1	0
Wigan Athletic	2023–24	League One	42	0	3	0	1	0	2	0	48	0
Wigan Athletic	2024–25	League One	31	1	2	0	1	0	2	0	30	0
Wigan Athletic	2025–26	League One	7	0	0	0	2	0	1	0	10	0
Wigan Athletic	Total		80	1	5	0	6	0	7	0	98	1
Career total			80	1	5	0	6	0	7	0	98	1
