= Sam Tickle =

English footballer

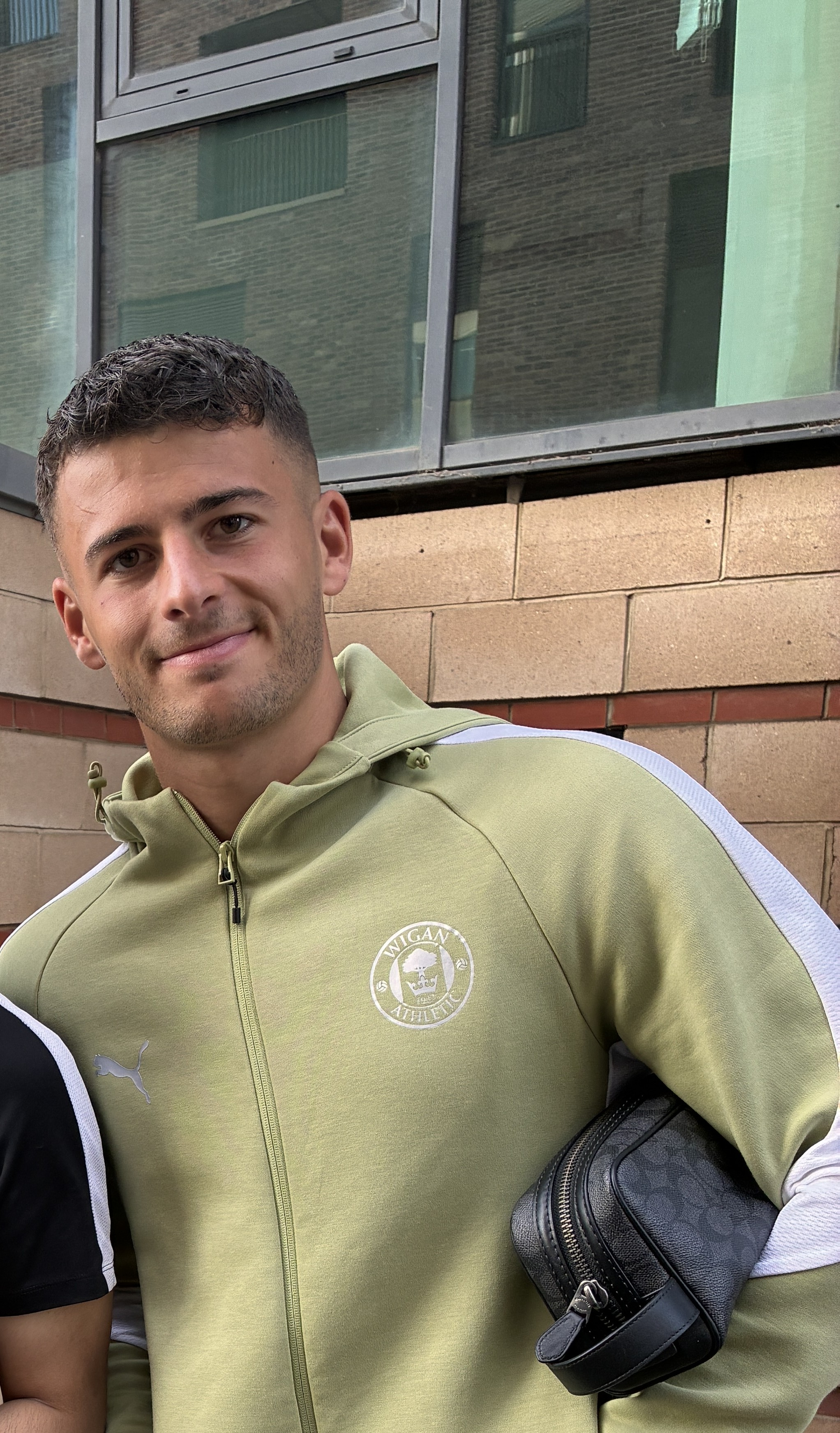
- Sam Tickle in 2025.

Personal information
- Full name: Samuel Lloyd Tickle
- Date of birth: 31 March 2002 (age 24)
- Place of birth: Warrington, England
- Height: 6 ft 2 in (1.88 m)
- Position: Goalkeeper

Team information
- Current team: Bristol City
- Number: 1

Youth career
- 2012–2018: Wigan Athletic

Senior career*
Years	Team	Apps	(Gls)
2018–2019	Pilkington	21	(0)
2019–2026	Wigan Athletic	139	(0)
2022	→ Nantwich Town (loan)	7	(0)
2022	→ Warrington Rylands (loan)	6	(0)
2026–	Bristol City	1	(0)

International career^{‡}
2024	England U21	1	(0)
- * Club domestic league appearances and goals as of 18:17, 2 May 2026 (UTC) ‡ National team caps and goals as of 06:43, 20 January 2026 (UTC)

Samuel Lloyd Tickle (born 31 March 2002) is an English professional footballer who plays as a goalkeeper for EFL Championship club Bristol City.

== Club career ==
=== Wigan Athletic ===
Sam Tickle is a youth product of Wigan Athletic, having joined their youth academy in 2012. He was released at the end of the 2018 season. He then signed for Pilkington, making 21 league appearances and was named player of the season as they won the Cheshire Football League. During the 2018–19 season he was also selected as the number one for England Schoolboys FA & represented his country making five appearances, conceding only once. In 2019, he rejoined Wigan Athletic as a scholar.

He made his professional debut with Wigan in a 2–0 EFL Trophy loss to Crewe Alexandra on 5 October 2021.

On 19 March 2022, Tickle joined Northern Premier League Premier Division side Nantwich Town on a youth loan until 14 April 2022.

In July 2022, he joined Northern Premier League side Warrington Rylands on loan until January 2023. He made two appearances for the club, but was recalled by Wigan following an injury to first-choice goalkeeper Ben Amos. He was named on the bench against Birmingham City on 20 August 2022. He returned to Warrington Rylands on loan until January, but after four appearances was recalled again due to injuries to Jones and then Amos. He was named on the bench against Hull City and for the consecutive 10 games.

Despite off-the-field issues within the club, Tickle signed a new contract with Wigan Athletic in April 2023. On 8 May 2023, the final day of the 2022–23 season, Tickle was handed his league debut, keeping a clean sheet as already relegated Wigan held Rotherham United to a goalless draw.

Ahead of the 2023–24 season, Tickle was handed the number one shirt, manager Shaun Maloney revealing that he had known since his arrival that the goalkeeper would be his first-choice. Following a highly impressive debut season that saw him labelled the best goalkeeper in the English Football League by his manager, Tickle was named Wigan's Player of the Year, the first goalkeeper to win the award in thirteen years. Following the conclusion of the season, he signed a new four-year contract amid reported interest from a number of Championship clubs.

On 27 April 2025, Tickle was named in the EFL League One Team of the Season.

=== Bristol City ===
On 25 June 2026, Tickle's move to Bristol City was announced on a four year deal for an undisclosed fee.

== International career ==
In September 2023, Tickle was called up to the England under-21 squad for the first time. He made his U21 debut on 26 March 2024, playing the duration of a 7–0 win 2025 UEFA European Under-21 Championship qualification win over Luxembourg at the Toughsheet Community Stadium.

== Career statistics ==
As of match played 6 August 2026

Appearances and goals by club, season and competition
Club	Season	League			FA Cup		EFL Cup		Other		Total	
Club	Season	Division	Apps	Goals	Apps	Goals	Apps	Goals	Apps	Goals	Apps	Goals
Pilkington	2018-19	Cheshire Premier Division	21	0	—		—		0	0	21	0
Pilkington	2018-19	Total	21	0	—		—		0	0	21	0
Wigan Athletic	2020–21	League One	0	0	0	0	0	0	0	0	0	0
Wigan Athletic	2021–22	League One	0	0	0	0	0	0	1 (Note: Appearances in EFL Trophy)	0	1	0
Wigan Athletic	2022–23	Championship	1	0	0	0	0	0	—		1	0
Wigan Athletic	2023–24	League One	46	0	3	0	1	0	2	0	52	0
Wigan Athletic	2024–25	League One	46	0	4	0	1	0	0	0	51	0
Wigan Athletic	2025–26	League One	46	0	4	0	3	0	0	0	53	0
Wigan Athletic	Total		139	0	11	0	5	0	3	0	158	0
Nantwich Town (loan)	2021–22	Northern Premier Division	7	0	—		—		0	0	7	0
Nantwich Town (loan)	2021–22	Total	7	0	—		—		0	0	7	0
Warrington Rylands (loan)	2022–23	Northern Premier Division	6	0	—		—		0	0	6	0
Warrington Rylands (loan)	2022–23	Total	6	0	—		—		0	0	6	0
Bristol City	2026–27	Championship	0	0	0	0	1	0	—		1	0
Bristol City	Total		0	0	0	0	1	0	—		1	0
Career total			173	0	11	0	6	0	3	0	193	0

== Honours ==
Individual

- Wigan Athletic Player of the Year: 2023–24
- Wigan Athletic Players' Player of the Year: 2023–24
- EFL League One Team of the Season: 2024–25
