= Matt Smith (footballer, born 2000) =

English footballer (born 2000)

Personal information
- Full name: Matthew Gerrard Smith
- Date of birth: 5 October 2000 (age 26)
- Place of birth: Harlow, England
- Height: 1.76 m (5 ft 9 in)
- Position: Midfielder

Team information
- Current team: Stevenage
- Number: 24

Youth career
- 2007–2020: Arsenal

Senior career*
Years	Team	Apps	(Gls)
2020–2023	Arsenal	0	(0)
2020–2021	→ Swindon Town (loan)	24	(2)
2021	→ Charlton Athletic (loan)	8	(0)
2021–2022	→ Doncaster Rovers (loan)	43	(0)
2023–2026	Wigan Athletic	85	(3)
2026–	Stevenage	6	(0)
- * Club domestic league appearances and goals as of 12:26, 22 November 2026 (UTC)

Matthew Gerrard Smith (born 5 October 2000) is an English professional footballer who plays for Stevenage as a midfielder.

== Career ==
=== Arsenal ===
Born in Harlow, Essex, Smith began his career at Arsenal when he was seven. He progressed through the age groups at Arsenal. He was a part of the Arsenal Academy team that reached the final of the 2017–18 FA Youth Cup. During the 2018–19 season, whilst playing for Arsenal Under-18s, he was given the opportunity to play at a higher age group with six appearances for Arsenal Under-23s. His performances earned him his first professional contract at Arsenal. The next season he played for Arsenal Under-21s during two of their 2019–20 EFL Trophy group matches and was also nominated as the Premier League 2 Player of the Month Award in January 2020.

Due to the break in the 2019–20 Premier League season due to the COVID-19 pandemic in the United Kingdom, Smith was called up by the Arsenal head coach Mikel Arteta to train with the first team. He would later be named on the bench for Arsenal for their Premier League match against Southampton. He would continue to be named on the bench for the rest of the season but never played. He was also named on the bench for the 2020 FA Cup Final which Arsenal won and earned Smith a winner's medal despite not having made his first team debut for Arsenal.

==== Loan to Swindon Town ====
Smith signed on loan for League One side Swindon Town in August 2020 for the duration of the season. He scored his first goal for Swindon in a 3–1 win against Rochdale on 12 September 2020. He was recalled by Arsenal on 1 February 2021, having featured 27 times for Swindon, contributing two goals and three assists.

==== Loan to Charlton Athletic ====
On 1 February 2021, Smith moved to a different League One side, Charlton Athletic, on loan for the rest of the 2020-21 season. He made his debut in a 3-1 defeat to Portsmouth in League One on 2 February, coming on as a substitute for Andrew Shinnie in the 77th minute.

==== Loan to Doncaster Rovers ====
On 5 July 2021, Smith again returned to League One as he joined Doncaster Rovers on a season-long loan deal, linking back up with manager Richie Wellens whom he had played under at Swindon.

==== Return to Arsenal ====
On 16 June 2023, Arsenal announced that Smith would be leaving the club following the expiration of his contract.

=== Wigan Athletic ===
On 1 July 2023, Smith signed for EFL League One side Wigan Athletic. He was offered a new contract at the end of the 2025–26 season, but Smith left the club and became a free agent. He made 99 appearances during his three seasons at the club. He had a short trial at Lincoln City but moved on after two pre-season performances.

=== Stevenage ===
In September 2026 he signed for Stevenage.

== Style of play ==
With his technique on the ball and awareness off it, Smith typically operates as a deep-lying midfielder, taking the ball off his center-backs to either spread the play or fire passes through the lines.

== Career statistics ==
As of match played 21 November 2026

Appearances and goals by club, season and competition
Club	Season	League			FA Cup		League Cup		Other		Total	
Club	Season	Division	Apps	Goals	Apps	Goals	Apps	Goals	Apps	Goals	Apps	Goals
Arsenal U21	2018–19	—			—		—		1 (Note: Appearance(s) in EFL Trophy)	0	1	0
Arsenal U21	2019–20	—			—		—		1	0	1	0
Arsenal U21	2022–23	—			—		—		2	0	2	0
Arsenal U21	Total		—		—		—		4	0	4	0
Arsenal	2020–21	Premier League	0	0	0	0	0	0	0	0	0	0
Arsenal	2021–22	Premier League	0	0	0	0	0	0	0	0	0	0
Arsenal	2022–23	Premier League	0	0	0	0	0	0	0	0	0	0
Arsenal	Total		0	0	0	0	0	0	0	0	0	0
Swindon Town (loan)	2020–21	League One	24	2	1	0	0	0	2	0	27	2
Charlton Athletic (loan)	2020–21	League One	8	0	0	0	0	0	0	0	8	0
Doncaster Rovers (loan)	2021–22	League One	43	0	2	0	1	0	3	0	49	0
Wigan Athletic	2023–24	League One	28	1	0	0	1	0	1	0	30	1
Wigan Athletic	2024–25	League One	19	1	2	0	1	0	4	0	26	1
Wigan Athletic	2025–26	League One	38	1	4	0	1	0	0	0	43	1
Wigan Athletic	Total		85	3	6	0	3	0	5	0	99	3
Stevenage	2026–27	League One	6	0	0	0	0	0	3	0	9	0
Career total			166	5	9	0	4	0	17	0	196	5

== Honours ==
Arsenal

- FA Cup: 2019–20
