= Harry McHugh =

English footballer

Personal information
- Full name: Harry McHugh
- Date of birth: 14 October 2002 (age 24)
- Place of birth: Liverpool, England
- Position: Forward

Team information
- Current team: Macclesfield
- Number: 31

Youth career
- Everton
- Wigan Athletic

Senior career*
Years	Team	Apps	(Gls)
2020–2026	Wigan Athletic	17	(0)
2022	→ Chester (loan)	2	(0)
2024	→ Ayr United (loan)	12	(1)
2026–	Macclesfield	0	(0)
- * Club domestic league appearances and goals as of 13:29, 27 March 2026 (UTC)

Harry McHugh (born 14 October 2002) is an English footballer who plays as a forward for National League North club Macclesfield.

== Early life ==
McHugh was born in Liverpool.

== Career ==
After a spell with Everton, McHugh joined Wigan Athletic's academy at under-13 level. He signed a two-year scholarship in 2019. McHugh made his debut for Wigan Athletic on 8 November 2020 as a substitute in a 3–2 FA Cup defeat to Chorley, and made his first senior start in their following match, a 2–2 draw with Tranmere Rovers in the EFL Trophy 11 November 2020. He scored his first goal for the club in that match, a 25-yard finish in first-half stoppage time. His first league appearance came as a late substitute in a 0–0 home draw against Bristol Rovers on 24 November 2020.

On 8 September 2022, McHugh signed for National League North club Chester on an initial 28-day loan.

On 1 February 2024, McHugh joined Scottish Championship club Ayr United on loan until the end of the season.

On 27 March 2026, McHugh permanently signed for National League North club Macclesfield.

== Career statistics ==
As of match played 12 August 2025

Appearances and goals by club, season and competition
Club	Season	League			FA Cup		League Cup		Other		Total	
Club	Season	Division	Apps	Goals	Apps	Goals	Apps	Goals	Apps	Goals	Apps	Goals
Wigan Athletic	2020–21	League One	1	0	1	0	0	0	1 (Note: Appearance(s) in EFL Trophy)	1	3	1
Wigan Athletic	2021–22	League One	0	0	0	0	0	0	3	0	3	0
Wigan Athletic	2022–23	Championship	0	0	0	0	1	0	—		1	0
Wigan Athletic	2023–24	League One	2	0	1	0	0	0	3	1	6	1
Wigan Athletic	2024–25	League One	14	0	2	0	1	0	2	0	19	0
Wigan Athletic	2025–26	League One	0	0	0	0	1	0	0	0	1	0
Career total			17	0	4	0	3	0	9	2	33	2
