= Chris Sze =

English association football player

Personal information
- Full name: Christopher John Bernard Sze
- Date of birth: 9 December 2003 (age 22)
- Place of birth: England
- Height: 6 ft 1 in (1.85 m)
- Position: Midfielder

Team information
- Current team: FC Halifax Town (on loan from Wigan Athletic)
- Number: 18

Youth career
- 2015–2021: Wigan Athletic

Senior career*
| Years | Team | Apps | (Gls) |
| 2021– | Wigan Athletic | 38 | (2) |
| 2025–2026 | → Southport (loan) | 21 | (9) |
| 2026– | → FC Halifax Town (loan) | 1 | (1) |
- * Club domestic league appearances and goals as of 17:00, 14 November 2026 (UTC)

Christopher John Bernard Sze (born 9 December 2003) is an English professional footballer who plays as a midfielder for FC Halifax Town on loan from EFL League One side Wigan Athletic.

== Career ==
=== Wigan Athletic ===
Sze first joined Wigan Athletic at under-12s level from Liverpool Schoolboys. He signed his first professional contract with the club on 21 September 2021. He then made his first team debut later that day, appearing as a substitute against Sunderland in the EFL Cup. On 10 November 2021, he scored his first senior goal for the club in a 2–0 win against Shrewsbury Town in the EFL Trophy. On 7 September 2023, he signed a new three-year contract with the club until 2026. He scored his first league goal on 16 December 2023, in a 3–2 defeat to Port Vale in League One.

On 4 December 2025, Sze joined National League North side Southport on loan. He scored on his debut for the club on 6 December 2025, in a 2–2 draw with Telford United. On 2 February 2026, his loan with the club was extended until the end of the season.

On 10 July 2026, Sze signed a new one-year contract with Wigan with the option of a further year.

On 14 November 2026, Sze joined National League club FC Halifax Town on a one-month loan deal. He made his debut the same day, scoring in a 1–1 draw with Kidderminster Harriers.

== Career statistics ==
As of match played 14 November 2026

Appearances and goals by club, season and competition
| Club | Season | League | | | FA Cup | | League Cup | | Other | | Total | |
| Club | Season | Division | Apps | Goals | Apps | Goals | Apps | Goals | Apps | Goals | Apps | Goals |
|---|---|---|---|---|---|---|---|---|---|---|---|---|
| Wigan Athletic | 2021–22 | League One | 0 | 0 | 1 | 0 | 1 | 0 | 4 (Note: Appearances in EFL Trophy) | 1 | 6 | 1 |
| Wigan Athletic | 2022–23 | Championship | 1 | 0 | 0 | 0 | 0 | 0 | — | | 1 | 0 |
| Wigan Athletic | 2023–24 | League One | 19 | 1 | 0 | 0 | 1 | 0 | 4 | 1 | 24 | 2 |
| Wigan Athletic | 2024–25 | League One | 12 | 1 | 0 | 0 | 1 | 0 | 3 | 0 | 16 | 1 |
| Wigan Athletic | 2025–26 | League One | 0 | 0 | 0 | 0 | 0 | 0 | 0 | 0 | 0 | 0 |
| Wigan Athletic | 2026–27 | League One | 6 | 0 | 0 | 0 | 1 | 0 | 2 | 0 | 9 | 0 |
| Wigan Athletic | Total | | 38 | 2 | 1 | 0 | 4 | 0 | 13 | 2 | 56 | 4 |
| Southport (loan) | 2025–26 | National League North | 21 | 9 | 0 | 0 | — | | 3 (Note: Appearances in FA Trophy) | 3 | 24 | 12 |
| FC Halifax Town (loan) | 2026–27 | National League | 1 | 1 | 0 | 0 | — | | 0 | 0 | 1 | 1 |
| Career total | | | 60 | 12 | 1 | 0 | 4 | 0 | 16 | 5 | 81 | 17 |
