= Scott Smith (footballer, born 2001) =

Welsh footballer

Personal information
- Full name: Scott William Smith
- Date of birth: 7 February 2001 (age 25)
- Place of birth: Wigan, England
- Height: 1.73 m (5 ft 8 in)
- Position: Midfielder

Team information
- Current team: Barrow
- Number: 8

Youth career
- 2013–2017: Wigan Athletic

Senior career*
Years	Team	Apps	(Gls)
2020–2025	Wigan Athletic	71	(1)
2022	→ Torquay United (loan)	7	(0)
2025–	Barrow	28	(1)

International career
2019	Wales U19	3	(0)
- * Club domestic league appearances and goals as of 19:25, 26 April 2026 (UTC)

Scott William Smith (born 7 February 2001) is a professional footballer who plays as a midfielder for National League club Barrow. Born in England, he represented Wales at youth level.

== Career ==
=== Wigan Athletic ===
Smith joined the youth academy of Wigan Athletic, and worked his way up their youth categories. He signed his first professional contract in 2019, and he captained their U23 side in the 2020-21 season. He made his professional debut with Wigan in a 1–1 (7–8) EFL Cup penalty shootout win over Hull City on 10 August 2021.

Smith was released upon the expiration of his contract at the end of the 2024–25 season.

=== Barrow ===
On 22 May 2025, Smith agreed to join League Two side Barrow on a two-year deal from 1 July.

== International career ==
Smith was a youth international for Wales, having represented the Wales U19s.

== Career statistics ==
As of end of 2024–25 season

Appearances and goals by club, season and competition
Club	Season	League			FA Cup		League Cup		Other		Total	
Club	Season	Division	Apps	Goals	Apps	Goals	Apps	Goals	Apps	Goals	Apps	Goals
Wigan Athletic	2021–22	League One	0	0	1	0	3	0	4 (Note: Appearance(s) in EFL Trophy)	0	8	0
Wigan Athletic	2022–23	Championship	2	0	0	0	1	0	0	0	3	0
Wigan Athletic	2023–24	League One	31	1	2	0	0	0	4	0	37	1
Wigan Athletic	2024–25	League One	38	0	4	1	1	0	3	0	46	1
Wigan Athletic	Total		71	1	7	1	5	0	11	0	94	2
Torquay United (loan)	2022–23	National League	7	0	0	0	—		0	0	7	0
Career total			78	1	7	1	5	0	11	0	101	2
