= Liam Morrison =

Scottish footballer

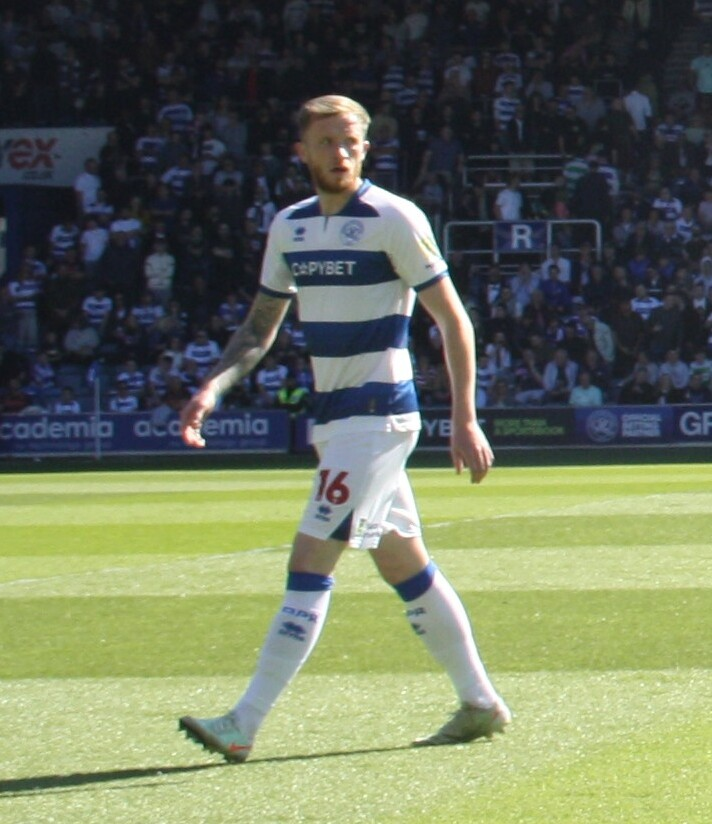
- Morrison with Queens Park Rangers in 2025

Personal information
- Full name: Liam John Morrison
- Date of birth: 7 April 2003 (age 23)
- Place of birth: Saltcoats, Scotland
- Height: 1.83 m (6 ft 0 in)
- Position: Centre-back

Team information
- Current team: Queens Park Rangers
- Number: 4

Youth career
- Rangers
- –2019: Celtic
- 2019–2021: Bayern Munich

Senior career*
Years	Team	Apps	(Gls)
2021–2024	Bayern Munich II	24	(1)
2023–2024	→ Wigan Athletic (loan)	30	(1)
2024–	Queens Park Rangers	31	(0)
2026	→ Aberdeen (loan)	14	(1)

International career^{‡}
2017–2018	Scotland U16	12	(0)
2018–2019	Scotland U17	9	(2)
2021	Scotland U19	2	(0)
2023–2024	Scotland U21	11	(0)
- * Club domestic league appearances and goals as of 20 May 2026 ‡ National team caps and goals as of 22:50, 7 June 2024 (UTC)

Liam John Morrison (born 7 April 2003) is a Scottish professional footballer who plays as a centre-back for Queens Park Rangers.

== Club career ==
=== Early career ===
Morrison was born in Saltcoats, Scotland, and played for Scottish clubs Rangers and Celtic as a youth player. After some impressive performances with the latter, he was reportedly linked with a move to a number of English clubs, as well as German side TSG Hoffenheim. He was promoted to the Celtic first team squad for pre-season friendlies in Austria and Switzerland in June 2019.

=== Bayern Munich ===
Around this time, German champions Bayern Munich made a bid to sign Morrison before Celtic were able to tie him down to a professional contract. Despite Celtic's efforts to persuade him to stay, Morrison joined Bayern in August 2019, and later revealed that his main reason for signing was the pathway to the German side's first team that was laid out to him. He was also quoted as saying that he initially believed the Bavarian side's interest was "a joke".

Morrison integrated well into Bayern Munich's youth teams, citing coaches Miroslav Klose and Martin Demichelis as great influences on improving his game. In October 2020, he was named among the 60 best young talents in the world by English newspaper The Guardian. After Barry Hepburn made the same move from Celtic to Bayern, Morrison was credited with helping his younger compatriot to integrate into the squad.

==== Loan to Wigan Athletic ====
On 27 June 2023, he moved to England and joined EFL League One club Wigan Athletic on loan for the 2023–24 season.

=== Queens Park Rangers ===
On 5 July 2024, Morrison joined EFL Championship club Queens Park Rangers for an undisclosed fee.

==== Loan to Aberdeen ====
In January 2026, he signed on loan with Scottish Premiership side Aberdeen.

== International career ==
Morrison has represented Scotland at under-16, under-17, under-19 and under-21 levels. He scored twice for the Scotland under-17 team in a 2–1 UEFA European Under-17 Championship qualification victory over Iceland in 2019.

== Career statistics ==
As of match played 17 May 2026

Appearances and goals by club, season and competition
Club	Season	League			National cup (Note: Includes FA Cup)		League cup (Note: Includes EFL Cup)		Other		Total	
Club	Season	Division	Apps	Goals	Apps	Goals	Apps	Goals	Apps	Goals	Apps	Goals
Bayern Munich II	2021–22	Regionalliga Bayern	4	0	—		—		—		4	0
Bayern Munich II	2022–23	Regionalliga Bayern	20	1	—		—		—		20	1
Bayern Munich II	2023–24	Regionalliga Bayern	0	0	—		—		—		0	0
Bayern Munich II	Total		24	1	0	0	0	0	0	0	24	1
Wigan Athletic (loan)	2023–24	EFL League One	30	1	2	0	1	0	2 (Note: Appearances in the EFL Trophy.)	1	35	2
Queens Park Rangers	2024–25	EFL Championship	19	0	0	0	2	0	—		21	0
Queens Park Rangers	2025–26	EFL Championship	12	0	0	0	0	0	—		12	0
Queens Park Rangers	Total		31	0	0	0	2	0	0	0	33	0
Aberdeen (loan)	2025–26	Scottish Premiership	14	1	1	0	0	0	—		15	1
Career Total			99	3	3	0	3	0	2	1	107	4
