= James Carragher =

Malta international footballer (born 2002)

- Carragher playing for Wigan Athletic in 2026

Personal information
- Full name: James Lee Carragher
- Date of birth: 11 November 2002 (age 24)
- Place of birth: Liverpool, England
- Height: 6 ft 4 in (1.92 m)
- Position: Centre-back

Team information
- Current team: Wigan Athletic
- Number: 23

Youth career
- 2011–2017: Liverpool
- 2017–2021: Wigan Athletic

Senior career*
Years	Team	Apps	(Gls)
2021–	Wigan Athletic	70	(2)
2022–2023	→ Oldham Athletic (loan)	5	(0)
2024	→ Inverness Caledonian Thistle (loan)	14	(0)

International career^{‡}
2025–	Malta	4	(0)
- * Club domestic league appearances and goals as of 20:40, 3 November 2026 (UTC) ‡ National team caps and goals as of 23:20, 10 June 2025 (UTC)

James Lee Carragher (born 11 November 2002) is a professional footballer who plays as a centre-back for EFL League One club Wigan Athletic. Born in England, he plays for the Malta national team.

== Early and personal life ==
James Lee Carragher was born on 11 November 2002 in Liverpool, Merseyside. He is the son of the former Liverpool and England footballer Jamie Carragher. He is of Maltese and Irish descent through his paternal grandparents.

In February 2025, Carragher and his father received citizenship of Malta. He was entitled to the nationality through descent from Paul Vassallo of Qormi, his father's maternal grandfather.

== Club career ==
After Carragher began playing football with Liverpool as an under-8 in 2011, he joined the youth academy of Wigan Athletic in 2017. Carragher captained Wigan's under-18s as they won the U18 Professional Development League in the 2020–21 season. He signed his first professional contract with Wigan on 4 August 2021. He made his debut with Wigan Athletic in a penalty shoot-out win over Hull City in the EFL Cup on 10 August 2021. He signed a new two-year contract with Wigan on 27 April 2023.

Carragher joined National League club Oldham Athletic on 16 September 2022 on loan until 1 January 2023. He made 6 appearances in all competitions during his loan spell. On 10 January 2024, Carragher joined Scottish Championship side Inverness Caledonian Thistle on loan until the end of the season. He made his competitive debut two days later in a 1–0 loss at home to Dundee United. He made a total of 20 appearances in all competitions as the club were relegated via the play-offs.

Carragher made his league debut for Wigan against Crawley Town on 24 August 2024. He scored his first professional career goal on 25 January 2025, heading in Wigan's opener in their 2–0 win against Bristol Rovers.

== International career ==
After Carragher obtained Maltese nationality in February 2025, Malta Football Association president Bjorn Vassallo said that they were considering the player for the national team. On 14 March 2025, Malta called Carragher up for their World Cup qualifiers against Finland and Poland.

On 21 March 2025, Carragher made his debut for Malta against Finland in a World Cup qualifying match, starting and playing the full 90 minutes in a 1–0 loss.

== Career statistics ==
=== Club ===
As of match played on 10 November 2026

Appearances and goals by club, season and competition
Club	Season	League			National cup (Note: Includes FA Cup, Scottish Cup)		League cup (Note: Includes EFL Cup)		Other		Total	
Club	Season	Division	Apps	Goals	Apps	Goals	Apps	Goals	Apps	Goals	Apps	Goals
Wigan Athletic	2021–22	League One	0	0	0	0	1	0	3 (Note: Appearance(s) in EFL Trophy)	0	4	0
Wigan Athletic	2022–23	Championship	0	0	—		1	0	0	0	1	0
Wigan Athletic	2023–24	League One	0	0	0	0	0	0	1	0	1	0
Wigan Athletic	2024–25	League One	33	2	2	0	1	0	4	0	40	2
Wigan Athletic	2025–26	League One	25	0	3	1	0	0	0	0	28	1
Wigan Athletic	2026–27	League One	12	0	1	0	1	0	2	0	16	0
Wigan Athletic	Total		70	2	6	1	4	0	10	0	90	3
Oldham Athletic (loan)	2022–23	National League	5	0	1	0	—		0	0	6	0
Inverness Caledonian Thistle (loan)	2023–24	Scottish Championship	14	0	2	0	—		4 (Note: Appearances in Scottish Championship play-offs)	0	20	0
Career total			89	2	9	1	4	0	14	0	116	3

=== International ===
As of matches played 10 June 2025

Appearances and goals by national team and year
National team	Year	Apps	Goals
Malta	2025	4	0
Total		4	0
