= Dale Taylor =

Northern Irish footballer (born 2003)

Personal information
- Full name: Dale Taylor
- Date of birth: 12 December 2003 (age 22)
- Place of birth: Belfast, Northern Ireland
- Height: 1.85 m (6 ft 1 in)
- Position: Forward

Team information
- Current team: Blackpool
- Number: 18

Youth career
- Greenisland
- Linfield
- 2020–2022: Nottingham Forest

Senior career*
| Years | Team | Apps | (Gls) |
| 2022–2025 | Nottingham Forest | 0 | (0) |
| 2023 | → Burton Albion (loan) | 20 | (5) |
| 2023–2024 | → Wycombe Wanderers (loan) | 42 | (5) |
| 2024–2025 | → Wigan Athletic (loan) | 43 | (11) |
| 2025– | Blackpool | 19 | (3) |

International career^{‡}
| 2018 | Northern Ireland U16 | 2 | (0) |
| 2018–2019 | Northern Ireland U17 | 11 | (1) |
| 2021 | Northern Ireland U19 | 2 | (0) |
| 2021–2024 | Northern Ireland U21 | 12 | (2) |
| 2021– | Northern Ireland | 9 | (0) |
- * Club domestic league appearances and goals as of 00:23, 13 May 2026 (UTC) ‡ National team caps and goals as of 21 March 2025

Dale Taylor (born 12 December 2003) is a Northern Irish professional footballer who plays as a forward for EFL League One club Blackpool and the Northern Ireland national team.

== Club career ==
=== Nottingham Forest ===
Taylor is a former youth academy player of Greenisland and Linfield. He joined English club Nottingham Forest in July 2020. He signed his first professional contract with the club in December 2020. On 4 July 2022, Taylor signed a new three-year deal with Forest.

On 23 August 2022, Taylor made his professional debut in a 3–0 victory over Grimsby Town in the EFL Cup.

==== Burton Albion (loan) ====
On 20 January 2023, Taylor signed on loan with EFL League One side Burton Albion for the remainder of the season. Taylor scored his first senior league goal in a 2–0 victory over Oxford United on 28 January 2023.

==== Wycombe Wanderers (loan) ====
On 23 July 2023, Taylor signed with League One side Wycombe Wanderers on a season-long loan. In the 2024 EFL Trophy final at Wembley Stadium, Taylor scored an 89th-minute equaliser against Peterborough United, but Wycombe went on to lose the match 2–1.

==== Wigan Athletic (loan) ====
On 28 August 2024, Taylor returned to League One, joining Wigan Athletic on a season-long loan deal. He scored 11 goals for the club, and received the club's Player of the Year award.

=== Blackpool ===
On 7 August 2025, Taylor signed for League One club Blackpool for an undisclosed fee, signing a four-year contract with an optional fifth year. Due to a clerical error by the club, resulting in an issue with his registration with the Football League, Taylor was unable to make his debut on 9 August as planned. He scored his first goal for the club in a 5–0 victory over Barrow in the EFL Trophy on 16 September. After a two-month break due to injury, Taylor returned to action on 13 December. On 26 December, he was injured in the first few minutes of Blackpool's victory against Doncaster Rovers at Bloomfield Road. Head coach Ian Evatt revealed that Taylor had broken a metatarsal and would likely be out for at least six to eight weeks.

== International career ==
Taylor has represented Northern Ireland at youth level. In November 2021, he received his first call-up to the Northern Ireland national team. He made his senior team debut on 12 November 2021 in a 1–0 World Cup qualifier win against Lithuania.

== Career statistics ==
=== Club ===
As of end of 2025–26 season

Appearances and goals by club, season and competition
| Club | Season | League | | | FA Cup | | League Cup | | Other | | Total | |
| Club | Season | Division | Apps | Goals | Apps | Goals | Apps | Goals | Apps | Goals | Apps | Goals |
|---|---|---|---|---|---|---|---|---|---|---|---|---|
| Nottingham Forest | 2022–23 | Premier League | 0 | 0 | 0 | 0 | 1 | 0 | — | | 1 | 0 |
| Nottingham Forest | 2023–24 | Premier League | 0 | 0 | 0 | 0 | 0 | 0 | — | | 0 | 0 |
| Nottingham Forest | 2024–25 | Premier League | 0 | 0 | 0 | 0 | 0 | 0 | — | | 0 | 0 |
| Nottingham Forest | Total | | 0 | 0 | 0 | 0 | 1 | 0 | — | | 1 | 0 |
| Burton Albion (loan) | 2022–23 | League One | 20 | 5 | — | | — | | — | | 20 | 5 |
| Wycombe Wanderers (loan) | 2023–24 | League One | 42 | 5 | 2 | 0 | 1 | 0 | 7 (Note: Appearance(s) in EFL Trophy) | 4 | 52 | 9 |
| Wigan Athletic (loan) | 2024–25 | League One | 43 | 11 | 4 | 0 | 0 | 0 | 0 | 0 | 47 | 11 |
| Blackpool | 2025–26 | League One | 19 | 3 | 0 | 0 | 1 | 0 | 1 | 1 | 21 | 4 |
| Career total | | | 124 | 24 | 6 | 0 | 3 | 0 | 8 | 5 | 141 | 29 |

=== International ===
As of match played 21 March 2025

Appearances and goals by national team and year
| National team | Year | Apps | Goals |
|---|---|---|---|
| Northern Ireland | 2021 | 1 | 0 |
| Northern Ireland | 2023 | 5 | 0 |
| Northern Ireland | 2024 | 2 | 0 |
| Northern Ireland | 2025 | 1 | 0 |
| Total | | 9 | 0 |

== Honours ==
Wycombe Wanderers

- EFL Trophy runner-up: 2023–24

Individual

- Wigan Athletic Player of the Year: 2024–25
