= Youssef Chentouf =

English footballer (born 2004)

Personal information
- Date of birth: 10 February 2004 (age 22)
- Place of birth: Barnet, England
- Height: 1.80 m (5 ft 11 in)
- Position: Forward

Team information
- Current team: Brighouse Town

Youth career
- Rising Ballers Kensington

Senior career*
Years	Team	Apps	(Gls)
2022–2024	Wigan Athletic	1	(0)
2022–2023	→ Slough Town (loan)	6	(1)
2024–2025	Hendon	8	(0)
2025	Royston Town	5	(0)
2025	Emley		
2025–	Brighouse Town		
- * Club domestic league appearances and goals as of 21:03, 19 October 2025 (UTC)

Youssef Chentouf (born 10 February 2004) is an English professional footballer who plays as a forward. He currently plays for Northern Premier League Division One East club Brighouse Town.

== Career ==
Chentouf grew up in a Moroccan family in Barnet. He played for Pinnacle and Rising Ballers Kensington before he turned professional at Wigan Athletic following a trial period in June 2022. He joined National League South club Slough Town on loan in November 2022. He featured in seven matches, scoring one goal against Oxford City on New Year's Day. He made his senior debut for Wigan on the last day of the 2022–23 season, in a 0–0 draw with Rotherham United at the DW Stadium.

He was released by Wigan at the end of the 2023–24 season.

On 5 October 2024, Chentouf signed for Isthmian League Premier Division club Hendon.

After a spell at Royston Town, Chentouf joined Emley on 19 September 2025.

On 8 October 2025, Chentouf joined Brighouse Town.

== Style of play ==
Chentouf is a pacey forward.

== Career statistics ==
As of match played 8 May 2023

Appearances and goals by club, season and competition
Club	Season	League			FA Cup		EFL Cup		Other		Total	
Club	Season	Division	Apps	Goals	Apps	Goals	Apps	Goals	Apps	Goals	Apps	Goals
Wigan Athletic	2022–23	EFL Championship	1	0	0	0	0	0	0	0	1	0
Wigan Athletic	2023–24	EFL League One	0	0	0	0	0	0	0	0	0	0
Wigan Athletic	Total		1	0	0	0	0	0	0	0	1	0
Slough Town (loan)	2022–23	National League South	6	1	—		—		1 (Note: Appearances in FA Trophy)	0	7	1
Career total			7	1	0	0	0	0	1	0	8	1
