= Luke Robinson (footballer, born 2001) =

Scottish footballer

Personal information
- Full name: Luke James Robinson
- Date of birth: 20 November 2001 (age 24)
- Place of birth: Birkenhead, England
- Height: 5 ft 9 in (1.76 m)
- Position: Left-back

Team information
- Current team: Dunfermline Athletic

Youth career
- –2017: AC Hoylake
- 2017–2018: Wrexham
- 2018–2020: Wigan Athletic

Senior career*
Years	Team	Apps	(Gls)
2020–2026	Wigan Athletic	64	(1)
2022–2023	→ Tranmere Rovers (loan)	2	(0)
2023	→ St Johnstone (loan)	18	(0)
2024	→ St Johnstone (loan)	14	(0)
2026–	Dunfermline Athletic	0	(0)

International career^{‡}
2018	Scotland U18	1	(0)
2019	Scotland U19	4	(0)
- * Club domestic league appearances and goals as of 12:20, 23 October 2024 (UTC) ‡ National team caps and goals as of 09:30, 25 December 2020 (UTC)

Luke James Robinson (born 20 November 2001) is a professional footballer who plays as a left-back for Scottish Championship side Dunfermline Athletic.

== Club career ==
Born in Birkenhead, Robinson played youth football for AC Hoylake, Wrexham and Wigan Athletic before starting a two-year scholarship deal with Wigan in summer 2018. He signed a two-and-a-half-year contract in March 2020. He made his debut for Wigan as a late substitute in a League One victory over Sunderland in December 2020.

In July 2022, Robinson signed a new two-year contract with Wigan. He proceeded to sign a season-long loan contract at Tranmere Rovers, his hometown club. He made three appearances for the club, but suffered an ankle injury in training, and did not play again for the rest of the season.

On 22 August 2023, Robinson joined Scottish Premiership club St Johnstone on a season-long loan. Having been recalled from his loan on 31 December 2023, he returned to the club on loan until the end of the season on 19 January 2024.

On 9 May 2025, Wigan announced it had triggered a one year extension of his contract. He was released at the end of the 2025–26 season.

On 6 July 2026, Robinson signed a two-year contract with Scottish club Dunfermline Athletic.

== International career ==
He has played for Scotland internationally at under-18 and under-19 levels.

== Career statistics ==
As of end of the 2023–24 season

Appearances and goals by club, season and competition
Club	Season	League			National Cup (Note: Includes FA Cup, Scottish Cup)		League Cup		Other		Total	
Club	Season	Division	Apps	Goals	Apps	Goals	Apps	Goals	Apps	Goals	Apps	Goals
Wigan Athletic	2020–21	League One	25	0	0	0	0	0	0	0	25	0
Wigan Athletic	2021–22	League One	1	0	2	0	1	0	6 (Note: Appearances in EFL Trophy)	0	10	0
Wigan Athletic	2022–23	League One	0	0	0	0	0	0	0	0	0	0
Wigan Athletic	2023–24	League One	1	0	0	0	0	0	0	0	1	0
Wigan Athletic	Total		27	0	2	0	1	0	6	0	36	0
Tranmere Rovers (loan)	2022–23	League Two	2	0	0	0	1	0	0	0	3	0
St Johnstone (loan)	2023–24	Scottish Premiership	32	0	1	0	—		0	0	33	0
Career total			61	0	3	0	2	0	6	0	71	0
