= Ben Amos =

English footballer (born 1990)

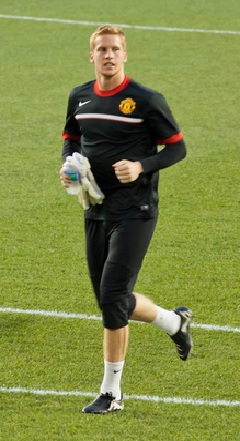
- Amos training with Manchester United in 2011

Personal information
- Full name: Benjamin Paul Amos
- Date of birth: 10 April 1990 (age 36)
- Place of birth: Macclesfield, England
- Height: 6 ft 2 in (1.88 m)
- Position: Goalkeeper

Team information
- Current team: Burnley
- Number: 13

Youth career
- 1993–2000: Crewe Alexandra
- 2001–2008: Manchester United

Senior career*
Years	Team	Apps	(Gls)
2008–2015	Manchester United	1	(0)
2009	→ Peterborough United (loan)	1	(0)
2010	→ Molde (loan)	8	(0)
2011	→ Oldham Athletic (loan)	16	(0)
2012–2013	→ Hull City (loan)	17	(0)
2013–2014	→ Carlisle United (loan)	9	(0)
2015	→ Bolton Wanderers (loan)	9	(0)
2015–2019	Bolton Wanderers	40	(0)
2016–2017	→ Cardiff City (loan)	16	(0)
2017–2018	→ Charlton Athletic (loan)	46	(0)
2018–2019	→ Millwall (loan)	12	(0)
2019–2021	Charlton Athletic	46	(0)
2021–2024	Wigan Athletic	75	(0)
2024–2026	Port Vale	30	(0)
2026–	Burnley	0	(0)

International career
2004–2005	England U16	3	(0)
2005–2007	England U17	7	(0)
2008	England U18	1	(0)
2008	England U19	2	(0)
2009	England U20	1	(0)
2011–2012	England U21	3	(0)
- * Club domestic league appearances and goals as of 17:10, 5 August 2026 (UTC)

Benjamin Paul Amos (born 10 April 1990) is an English professional footballer who plays as a goalkeeper for EFL Championship club Burnley. He was capped by England up to under-21 level.

Amos was released from the Academy at Crewe Alexandra as a midfielder at the age of ten. He converted to playing in goal and earned a place at the Academy at Manchester United a year later. He made his competitive first-team debut in September 2008 and played seven games in seven seasons, including an appearance in the Premier League and UEFA Champions League. He gained experience playing on loan at Peterborough United, Molde (Norway), Oldham Athletic, Hull City, Carlisle United and Bolton Wanderers. He was released by Manchester United and joined Bolton Wanderers permanently in July 2015. He featured 43 times in the 2015–16 season and then had loan spells at Cardiff City, Charlton Athletic and Millwall.

Having played 50 games on loan at Charlton in the 2017–18 campaign, Amos joined the club in July 2019 upon being released by Bolton. He remained on the bench for the 2019–20 relegation season in the Championship before playing every League One game the following season. He signed with Wigan Athletic in June 2021 and played every league game as they won the League One title in the 2021–22 campaign. He was dropped following relegation the following season and signed with Port Vale in July 2024. He was promoted out of League Two with the club at the end of the 2024–25 season. He joined Burnley in August 2026.

== Club career ==
=== Crewe Alexandra ===
Amos was born in Macclesfield, Cheshire and was a member of the Crewe Alexandra Academy until he was released at the age of 10. While at Crewe, he also played for another local team, Bollington United, as a centre midfielder. One year later, Amos was playing for his local team against the team at the top of the table, and they needed to win the match to win the league. Amos' team's goalkeeper was injured during the game, and as the tallest on the team, Amos was put in goal; however, he had also been the team's regular penalty taker all season, so when they were awarded a penalty, he went all the way up the pitch to take the kick. He scored, and his team went on to win the game 3–2, together with the league title. After the game, his parents told him that a Manchester United scout had been watching him and that he had been invited for trials. Amos joined Manchester United at the age of 11.

=== Manchester United ===
In his first season at Manchester United, Amos became a regular starter for the club's under-13 team, playing in 19 out of 27 matches in the 2001–02 season. His first appearance for the under-18s came on 8 October 2005, when he came on as a substitute for Danny Rose after starting goalkeeper Ron-Robert Zieler was sent off in a 2–0 defeat to Bolton Wanderers. He was regularly named as an unused substitute during the 2005–06 season – including for two reserve team matches – but became a frequent starter for the under-18s in 2006–07 after signing a trainee contract in July 2006. However, he missed the final of the 2006–07 FA Youth Cup with a dislocated shoulder.

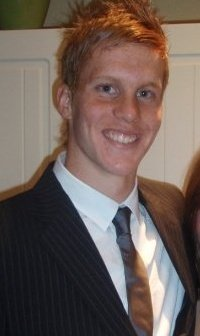
Amos in 2008

He retained his place in the under-18 team for 2007–08 and debuted for the reserve team against Wigan Athletic on 7 November. During the season, he impressed enough to be selected to go on the first-team's 2008 summer tour of South Africa. Amos was named as a substitute for all three matches of the tour, but did not play. En route back from South Africa, United stopped off in Nigeria to play against Portsmouth on 27 July, with Amos replacing Tomasz Kuszczak after 76 minutes. He made his competitive first-team debut on 23 September 2008 in a 3–1 win at home to Middlesbrough in the third round of the League Cup. On 14 December, Amos travelled to Japan with the Manchester United squad for the 2008 FIFA Club World Cup, having been called up as a late replacement for Ben Foster, who had suffered a hand injury while training. He was an unused substitute in the final as United won the competition by defeating Ecudoarian club L.D.U. Quito at the Nissan Stadium.

On 29 October 2009, Amos signed for the Championship club Peterborough United on a month's loan as cover for Peterborough's suspended first-choice goalkeeper Joe Lewis. The club were managed by Darren Ferguson, son of Manchester United manager Alex Ferguson. He made his only appearance at London Road on 31 October in a 2–1 defeat against Barnsley. After returning to Manchester United, Amos was again sent out on loan in March 2010, this time to Norwegian side Molde FK, where he remained on loan until 30 June 2010. Head coach Kjell Jonevret was able to bring him to the club due to the connections between Molde and Manchester United's reserve team coach Ole Gunnar Solskjær. Amos said the loan at the Aker Stadion gave him a lot of life skills as he had to adapt to life in a foreign country.

Following the departure of Ben Foster from Manchester United to Birmingham City, United manager Alex Ferguson declared that Amos would be Manchester United's third-choice goalkeeper for the 2010–11 season behind Edwin van der Sar and Tomasz Kuszczak. He made his first appearance of the season on 26 October, starting in goal for United's 3–2 win over Wolverhampton Wanderers in the fourth round of the League Cup. In United's final Champions League group match on 7 December, Amos was picked to start against Valencia at Old Trafford. Pablo Hernández scored Valencia's only goal past him after 32 minutes of the match – the first goal United had conceded in the Champions League that season – as the two sides played out a 1–1 draw.

With the signing of Danish goalkeeper Anders Lindegaard, Manchester United allowed Amos to join Oldham Athletic on loan for the remainder of the 2010–11 season on 7 January. He would, however, continue to train with Manchester United once a week. He was signed to provide competition for Oldham's Dean Brill. He made his League One debut against Swindon Town the next day and kept a clean sheet. However, three days later, he conceded all six goals in a 6–0 defeat to Southampton at Boundary Park; he allowed Adam Lallana's 20 yards (18 m) shot underneath his body for the second goal, and he was rounded by Lee Barnard for the sixth. On 15 March, Lindegaard was ruled out for five weeks following a knee injury, so Amos was recalled from Oldham to cover for Edwin van der Sar and Tomasz Kuszczak. Amos was frustrated to be recalled from playing first-team football to return to the reserves. Oldham manager Paul Dickov explained that "at a club like United you need three 'keepers — one to play, one on the bench and one in case anything else happens". Amos went on to play the second half of the 2011 MLS All-Star Game, which ended in a 4–0 win for Manchester United.

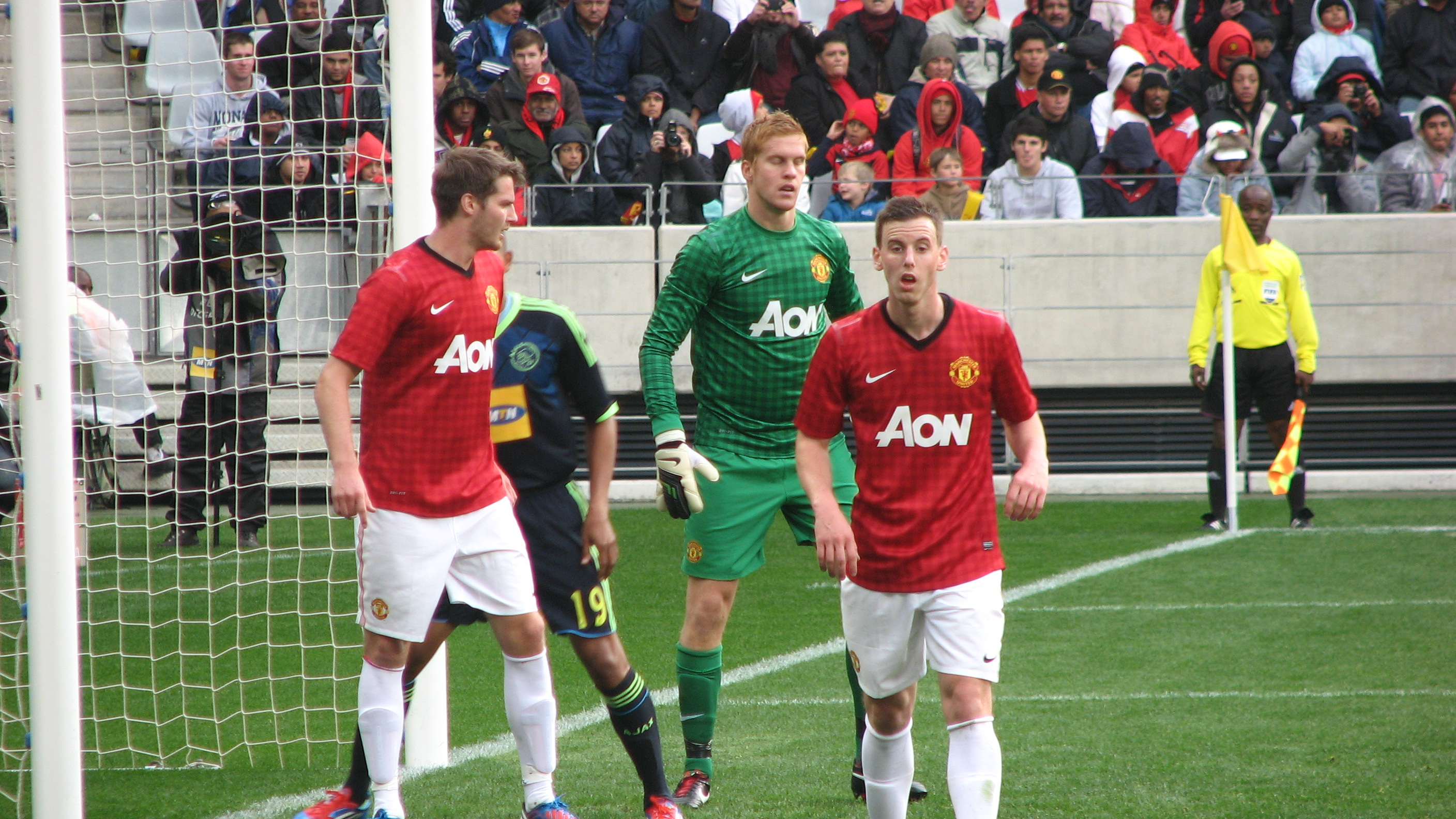
Nick Powell, Marnick Vermijl and Amos prepare to defend a corner in a pre-season friendly match against Ajax Cape Town on 21 July 2012.

Amos made his first start of the 2011–12 season in a third round League Cup tie at Elland Road against Leeds United. He kept a clean sheet as United cruised through to the next round winning 3–0. He played again in the following round away at Aldershot Town, a game which United also won 3–0 and advanced to the quarter finals. He was in goal again for United's League Cup game in a defeat against Championship club Crystal Palace on 30 November. It also seemed that he had moved above last season's second choice Tomasz Kuszczak in the pecking order but was now third choice behind Anders Lindegaard and David de Gea. He made his first Premier League start in a 2–0 home win against Stoke City on 31 January 2012, keeping a clean sheet on his debut. Amos signed a three-year contract extension with Manchester United in May 2012, which kept him at the club until 2015.

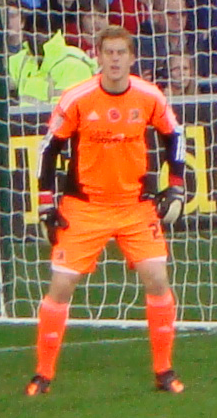
Amos playing for Hull City in 2012

On 31 July 2012, Amos joined Championship club Hull City on a season-long loan. Amos was Steve Bruce's first signing as Hull boss and the loan fee was reported as £250,000. Before the loan deal was completed, he had joined Hull on their pre-season training camp in Portugal. He made his debut at the KC Stadium on 11 August in 7–6 penalty shoot-out victory over Rotherham United in the first round of the League Cup. However, after 19 appearances, including two in the League Cup, Amos fell out with Bruce and returned to Manchester United on 3 January.

On 13 July 2013, he played in David Moyes's first game as Manchester United manager, a 1–0 defeat to a Thai All-Star XI in a pre-season friendly game where he was beaten by Teeratep Winothai at his near post. On 15 November, Amos joined League One club Carlisle United on a month-long loan after Mark Gillespie was sidelined for six weeks because of a knee injury. The loan was extended until the end of the year after four appearances for the Cumbrians. Manager Graham Kavanagh tried to extend the loan beyond January but was not successful in keeping him at Brunton Park as his parent club wanted him back as cover. Despite this, the arrival of Víctor Valdés as Manchester United's new reserve goalkeeper later in the transfer window demonstrated that Amos did not have a future at the club.

On 26 July 2014, he played the second half of a 3–2 win over AS Roma in the 2014 International Champions Cup and was criticised by manager Louis van Gaal for conceding from a speculative effort by Miralem Pjanić. Amos later said that he had stayed at Manchester United for too long after Ferguson left in 2013 but had wanted to stay at the club he supported in the hope of getting an unexpected opportunity simply by being in the "right place at the right time". He also added that Edwin van der Sar was a brilliant mentor.

=== Bolton Wanderers ===
On 30 January 2015, Amos joined Championship club Bolton Wanderers on a month's loan to provide competition for Andy Lonergan after Ádám Bogdán was ruled out with an ankle injury picked up in training. On 21 February, he made his Bolton debut as a substitute for the injured Lonergan as Wanderers lost 4–1 to Nottingham Forest at the City Ground. The loan was extended into a second month. Bolton fans voted him as the club's Player of the Month for March as he played all five games and kept a clean sheet against Millwall.

On 1 July 2015, Amos returned to Bolton Wanderers following his release from Manchester United, signing a four-year contract with the club. On 16 January, he was sent off and gave away a penalty for bringing down Jamie Ward in a 3–0 defeat at Nottingham Forest. On 20 February, he was criticised by manager Neil Lennon for conceding a late equaliser in a 1–1 draw with Queens Park Rangers at the Macron Stadium. Amos was subsequently dropped, though returned to the first XI under interim manager Jimmy Phillips and saved a penalty upon his return in a 1–0 defeat by Reading on 2 April.

After finding himself second choice behind summer signing, Mark Howard, Amos joined Championship rivals Cardiff City on loan for the 2016–17 season. He was kept out of the starting line-up by Ben Wilson, until 17 September, where he made his debut against Leeds United in a 2–0 defeat at the Cardiff City Stadium. He was signed by Paul Trollope, but remained as the first-choice in goal under Neil Warnock until mid-December, when he lost his place in the side to first Brian Murphy, and then loanee Allan McGregor following an error in defeat at Barnsley. Warnock bemoaned FA rules which left him unable to send Amos back to Bolton.

On 29 July 2017, Amos joined League One side Charlton Athletic on loan for the 2017–18 season. He endured an initial poor run of form, though enjoyed the public backing of manager Karl Robinson, who said that he had asked Amos to try and claim every ball, which would inevitably lead to the occasional dropped cross. He soon improved as the Addicks climbed the table up to fourth-place by matchday twelve. Robinson credited Amos for his performance in a 1–0 win at Bradford City on 21 October, singling out his one-handed save of a Matthew Kilgallon strike as "one of the best things I have ever seen live from a goalkeeper". Both Amos and Robinson were nominated for the division's monthly awards at the end of October. Charlton qualified for the play-offs with a sixth-place finish and Amos played both legs of the semi-final defeat to Shrewsbury Town. New manager Lee Bowyer said that he would be "amazed" if Amos were not named as Charlton's Player of the Year. However, defender Jay Dasilva won the award instead.

Bolton manager Phil Parkinson said the Charlton loan spell had greatly improved the player's confidence and that he was working very hard with goalkeeping coach Lee Butler. He was, though, keen to offload as much of the goalkeeper's £16,000-a-week wage from the playing budget as possible. He left Amos out of a pre-season trip to Scotland, relying instead on Mark Howard and Ben Alnwick, and he instructed Amos to find a new club. The club also stopped paying his wages in full and on time. On 13 July, Amos was signed by Championship side Millwall, joining the club for the 2018–19 season. Manager Neil Harris said that he wanted "a fight for the number one jersey" between Amos and number one Jordan Archer. David Martin was also signed on a short-term contract. Archer initially started until Amos replaced him in goal in the first half of the season after Harris alluded to a "mentality issue" with Archer; however, it was Martin who finished the campaign as first-choice as the Lions successfully avoided relegation. Amos did not feature at The Den after conceding four goals at Norwich City on 10 November. He also missed six weeks with a hand injury after a piece of bone was found floating in one of his fingers.

=== Charlton Athletic ===
On 15 July 2019, Amos returned to Charlton Athletic on a one-year deal. He was limited to one League Cup appearance during the 2019–20 campaign as Charlton were relegated from the Championship, with Dillon Phillips playing well despite the team's struggles. He also underwent finger surgery in November. Amos signed a one-year contract extension in August 2020. Phillips was sold to Cardiff City two months later.

Amos was named League One Player of the Month after having kept six clean sheets in October 2020, with the manager Lee Bowyer noting that it was unusual for a goalkeeper to win the award. He suffered a regression in form, as did the rest of the team, as the 2020–21 season progressed with talented understudy Ashley Maynard-Brewer on the bench. Amos was criticised in games against Bristol Rovers and AFC Wimbledon. Still, he grew in confidence with good saves against Doncaster Rovers and Sunderland before being singled out for praise by new manager Nigel Adkins following a 6–0 win at Plymouth Argyle. Amos played every minute of every league game for Charlton in the 2020–21 League One season, as they narrowly missed the play-offs. Amos kept 17 clean sheets across the season. Adkins was keen for Amos to sign a new deal at the club, though there remained strong interest from Ipswich Town and other clubs, and his departure from The Valley was confirmed on 28 June.

=== Wigan Athletic ===
Amos agreed a two-year deal at Wigan Athletic on 28 June 2021. He soon established himself as the club's first-choice goalkeeper, ahead of the club captain Jamie Jones. He settled in quickly in what was an almost entirely new team for the club, keeping seven clean sheets in his first 13 league matches. He played every league game of the 2021–22 season as Wigan secured promotion as League One champions.

He started five of the opening eight Championship games of the 2022–23 season. He damaged a ligament in his foot in August, which manager Leam Richardson said the club initially feared was an Achilles tendon rupture. Amos then cracked a rib in October, which saw him out until the end of the year. He ended the relegation campaign with 29 Championship appearances, conceding 36 goals (his expected goals were 33.04) and keeping seven clean sheets.

He served as backup to Sam Tickle in the 2023–24 season, causing him to remain on the bench for the club's FA Cup defeat to his former club Manchester United at the DW Stadium. Manager Shaun Maloney, speaking after Amos kept a clean sheet and saved two shoot-out penalties in the EFL Trophy, said that Amos had shown a great deal of improvement in 2023. On 10 May 2024, the club announced he would be released in the summer when his contract expired. He had kept 26 clean sheets in 83 appearances over all competitions for the Latics.

=== Port Vale ===
On 1 July 2024, Amos joined Port Vale on a two-year deal following the club's relegation into League Two. Manager Darren Moore said he would compete with Connor Ripley for a first-team spot. He made his league debut for the "Valiants" on New Year's Day, keeping a clean sheet in a 0–0 draw with Cheltenham Town at Vale Park. Ripley left the club on 3 February. On 1 April, Amos saved Richard Smallwood penalty in a 2–0 win over Bradford City at Vale Park, earning him the rating of fifth top performer in League Two that weekend. He played 23 league games throughout the 2024–25 campaign, helping the team to secure an automatic promotion place.

He missed the start of the 2025–26 campaign with a muscle injury. He returned to play his first game of the season in the EFL Trophy in October, ahead of new signing Marko Maroši, who had lost his first-team place to loanee Joe Gauci. Amos made his second league start of the campaign in December after keeping back-to-back clean sheets in the cup competitions. Gauci then regained his first-team spot from Amos, limiting him to seven League One appearances. He was released upon the expiry of his contract. He was part of the 45-man Professional Footballers' Association (PFA) free agent squad in July 2026.

=== Burnley ===
On 5 August 2026, Amos signed a one-year contract with Championship club Burnley.

== International career ==
Amos is an England youth international, having played for his country at the Under-16, under-17, under-18, under-19, under-20 and under-21 levels. Amos stated his hopes to be named to the Great Britain Olympic football team squad for the 2012 Summer Olympics, but did not make the final 18.

== Style of play ==
Amos is a goalkeeper with shot-stopping ability who likes to come out and collect crosses. He was praised for his bravery by Charlton's goalkeeping coach Lee Smelt.

== Personal life ==
Amos attended Fallibroome High School, where he earned 11 GCSEs at grade C or above.

== Career statistics ==
As of match played 10 February 2026

Appearances and goals by club, season and competition
Club	Season	League			National cup (Note: Includes FA Cup, Norwegian Football Cup)		League cup (Note: Includes Football League Cup)		Europe		Other		Total	
Club	Season	Division	Apps	Goals	Apps	Goals	Apps	Goals	Apps	Goals	Apps	Goals	Apps	Goals
Manchester United	2008–09	Premier League	0	0	0	0	1	0	0	0	0	0	1	0
Manchester United	2009–10	Premier League	0	0	0	0	0	0	0	0	0	0	0	0
Manchester United	2010–11	Premier League	0	0	0	0	1	0	1 (Note: Appearance(s) in UEFA Champions League)	0	—		2	0
Manchester United	2011–12	Premier League	1	0	0	0	3	0	0	0	0	0	4	0
Manchester United	2012–13	Premier League	0	0	0	0	—		0	0	—		0	0
Manchester United	2013–14	Premier League	0	0	0	0	0	0	0	0	0	0	0	0
Manchester United	2014–15	Premier League	0	0	0	0	0	0	—		—		0	0
Manchester United	Total		1	0	0	0	5	0	1	0	0	0	7	0
Peterborough United (loan)	2009–10	Championship	1	0	—		—		—		—		1	0
Molde (loan)	2010	Tippeligaen	8	0	1	0	—		—		—		9	0
Oldham Athletic (loan)	2010–11	League One	16	0	—		—		—		—		16	0
Hull City (loan)	2012–13	Championship	17	0	—		2	0	—		—		19	0
Carlisle United (loan)	2013–14	League One	9	0	0	0	—		—		—		9	0
Bolton Wanderers (loan)	2014–15	Championship	9	0	0	0	—		—		—		9	0
Bolton Wanderers	2015–16	Championship	40	0	2	0	1	0	—		—		43	0
Bolton Wanderers	2016–17	League One	0	0	—		1	0	—		—		1	0
Bolton Wanderers	Bolton total		49	0	2	0	2	0	—		—		53	0
Cardiff City (loan)	2016–17	Championship	16	0	0	0	—		—		—		16	0
Charlton Athletic (loan)	2017–18	League One	46	0	2	0	0	0	—		2 (Note: Appearances in League One Play-offs)	0	50	0
Millwall (loan)	2018–19	Championship	12	0	0	0	3	0	—		—		15	0
Charlton Athletic	2019–20	Championship	0	0	0	0	1	0	—		—		1	0
Charlton Athletic	2020–21	League One	46	0	0	0	2	0	—		0	0	48	0
Charlton Athletic	Total		92	0	2	0	3	0	—		2	0	99	0
Wigan Athletic	2021–22	League One	46	0	0	0	1	0	—		1 (Note: Appearance(s) in EFL Trophy)	0	48	0
Wigan Athletic	2022–23	Championship	29	0	2	0	0	0	—		—		31	0
Wigan Athletic	2023–24	League One	0	0	0	0	0	0	—		4	0	4	0
Wigan Athletic	Total		75	0	2	0	1	0	—		5	0	83	0
Port Vale	2024–25	League Two	23	0	0	0	1	0	—		4	0	28	0
Port Vale	2025–26	League One	7	0	1	0	0	0	—		5	0	13	0
Port Vale	Total		30	0	1	0	1	0	—		9	0	41	0
Burnley	2026–27	Championship	0	0	0	0	0	0	—		—		0	0
Career total			326	0	8	0	17	0	1	0	16	0	368	0

== Honours ==
Manchester United

- FIFA Club World Cup: 2008

Wigan Athletic

- EFL League One: 2021–22

Port Vale

- EFL League Two second-place promotion: 2024–25

Individual

- EFL League One Player of the Month: October 2020
