= Sessegnon =

Sessegnon or Sessègnon is a surname of West African origin. Notable persons with that name include:

- Stéphane Sessègnon (born 1984), Beninese association football striker
- Ryan Sessegnon (born 2000), English association football left-back
- Steven Sessegnon (born 2000), English association football defender or midfielder

Ryan and Steven are twin brothers; Stéphane is their cousin they also have an older brother, Chris who is a semi professional footballer.
