= Joe Adams (footballer, born 2004) =

Guernsey footballer (born 2004)

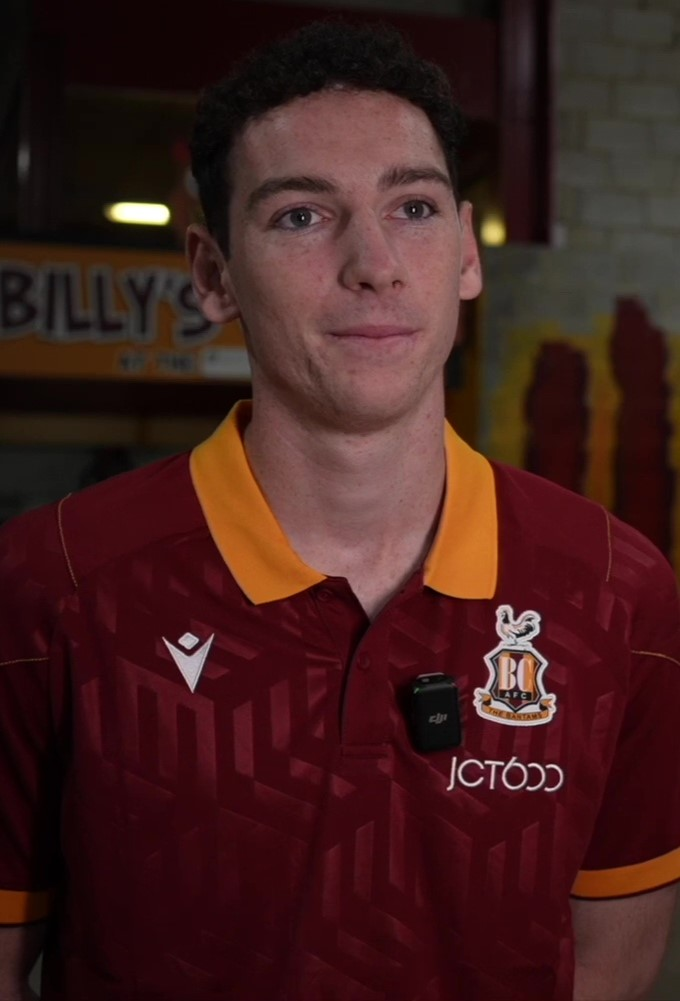
- Adams in 2024.

Personal information
- Full name: Joseph Crispini Adams
- Date of birth: 3 June 2004 (age 22)
- Place of birth: Guernsey
- Height: 1.78 m (5 ft 10 in)
- Position: Midfielder

Team information
- Current team: Wigan Athletic
- Number: 26

Youth career
- Ormer
- Eastleigh

Senior career*
Years	Team	Apps	(Gls)
2021–2022	Eastleigh	0	(0)
2021–2022	→ Sholing (dual registration)	12	(1)
2022–	Wigan Athletic	0	(0)
2022	→ AFC Totton (loan)	2	(1)
2024	→ Morecambe (loan)	21	(2)
2024–2025	→ Bradford City (loan)	1	(0)
- * Club domestic league appearances and goals as of 12:17, 22 September 2024 (UTC)

Joseph Crispini Adams (born 3 June 2004) is a Guernsey professional footballer who plays as a midfielder for EFL League One club Wigan Athletic.

== Career ==
Born on Guernsey, Adams began playing for local club Ormer. He later moved to Southampton and joined Eastleigh at under-16 level. He spent time on dual registration at Sholing, playing for them in the Southern Football League. He turned professional with Wigan Athletic in 2022, where he signed a contract extension in 2023. He spent time on loan at A.F.C. Totton, before moving on loan to Morecambe in January 2024.

On 23 August 2024, Adams joined League Two side Bradford City on a season-long loan deal, with Bradford City manager Graham Alexander saying he expected Adams to fight for a first-team place. Adams suffered a knee injury in his first league appearance for Bradford City, lasting 18 minutes of play. The injury was later revealed to be an ACL tear, with Adams expected to be out for the rest of the season. He returned to Wigan for his rehabilitation, and underwent surgery in November 2024. His loan with Bradford officially ended in January 2025.

On 9 May 2025, Wigan announced it had triggered a one-year extension of his contract.

== Playing style ==
Adams is known for his running ability and energy, being a box-to-box midfielder.
