= 2019–20 Preston North End F.C. season =

English football club season

Preston North End
2019–20 season
- Manager: Alex Neil
- Stadium: Deepdale
- Championship: 9th
- FA Cup: Third round
- EFL Cup: Third round
- Top goalscorer: League: Daniel Johnson (12); All: Daniel Johnson (12)
- Highest home attendance: 22,025 v Man City (EFL Cup)
- Lowest home attendance: 10,093 v Fulham (Championship)
- Average home league attendance: 13,579
Home colours	Away colours	Third colours

The 2019–20 season was Preston North End's 140th season in existence, and their fifth consecutive season in the Championship. Along with the Championship, the club also competed in the FA Cup and EFL Cup. The season covered the period from 1 July 2019 to 22 July 2020.

== Squad ==
No.	Name	Pos.	Nationality	Place of birth	Age	Apps	Goals	Signed from	Date signed	Fee	End
Goalkeepers
1	Declan Rudd	GK	(England)	Diss	29	169	0	Norwich City	1 July 2017	£966,000	2020
13	Michael Crowe	GK	(Wales) (Norway)	Bexleyheath	24	1	0	Ipswich Town	1 July 2018	Free	2020
25	Connor Ripley	GK	(England)	Middlesbrough	27	6	0	Middlesbrough	9 January 2019	Undisclosed	2022
Defenders
2	Darnell Fisher	RB	(England)	Reading	26	102	0	Rotherham United	27 July 2017	Undisclosed	2020
5	Tom Clarke	CB	(England)	Sowerby Bridge	32	247	15	Huddersfield Town	22 May 2013	Free	2020
6	Ben Davies	CB/LB	(England)	Barrow-in-Furness	24	126	2	Academy	25 January 2013	Free	2021
14	Jordan Storey	CB	(England)	Yeovil	22	44	1	Exeter City	1 July 2018	Undisclosed	2022
15	Joe Rafferty	RB	(Republic of Ireland) (England)	Liverpool	26	38	1	Rochdale	23 January 2019	Undisclosed	2022
16	Andrew Hughes	LB	(Wales)	Cardiff	28	62	4	Peterborough United	1 July 2018	Undisclosed	2021
21	Patrick Bauer	CB	(Germany)	Backnang	27	41	3	Charlton Athletic	1 July 2019	Free	2022
23	Paul Huntington	CB	(England)	Carlisle	32	281	18	Yeovil Town	22 May 2012	Free	2021
Midfielders
4	Ben Pearson	CM/DM	(England)	Oldham	25	153	2	Manchester United	11 January 2016	£115,000	2021
7	Tom Bayliss	CM	(England)	Leicester	21	5	0	Coventry City	2 August 2019	£2,000,000	2023
8	Alan Browne	CM	(Republic of Ireland)	Cork	25	251	32	Free agent	1 January 2014	Free	2021
10	Josh Harrop	AM/CF	(England)	Stockport	24	84	12	Manchester United	3 July 2017	Undisclosed	2021
11	Daniel Johnson	AM	(Jamaica)	Kingston	27	220	43	Aston Villa	23 January 2015	£50,000	2021
12	Paul Gallagher	AM/WG	(Scotland)	Glasgow	35	300	45	Leicester City	16 June 2015	Free	2020
18	Ryan Ledson	CM	(England)	Liverpool	22	45	0	Oxford United	1 July 2018	Undisclosed	2021
30	Jack Baxter	CM	(England)	Chorley	19	0	0	Academy	1 July 2017	Trainee	2019
32	Adam O'Reilly	CM	(Republic of Ireland)		19	1	0	Ringmahon Rangers	November 2016	Undisclosed	2020
44	Brad Potts	CM	(England)	Hexham	25	46	4	Barnsley	3 January 2019	Undisclosed	2022
Forwards
9	Louis Moult	CF	(England)	Stoke-on-Trent	28	40	8	Motherwell	1 January 2018	Undisclosed	2021
20	Jayden Stockley	CF	(England)	Poole	26	52	8	Exeter City	3 January 2019	£750,000	2022
24	Sean Maguire	CF	(Republic of Ireland)	Luton	26	96	18	Cork City	24 July 2017	Undisclosed	2021
29	Tom Barkhuizen	RW/SS	(England)	Blackpool	26	148	32	Morecambe	1 January 2017	Free	2022
31	Scott Sinclair	LW	(England)	Bath	31	18	3	Celtic	8 January 2020	Undisclosed	2022
35	David Nugent	CF	(England)	Huyton	35	132	38	Derby County	17 July 2019	Free	Undisclosed
39	Billy Bodin	RW/CF	(Wales)	Swindon	28	39	4	Bristol Rovers	3 January 2018	Undisclosed	2020
Out on Loan
3	Josh Earl	LB/LW	(England)	Liverpool	21	36	0	Academy	1 July 2017	Trainee	2021
17	Josh Ginnelly	LW	(England)	Coventry	23	9	0	Walsall	1 January 2019	Undisclosed	2021
27	Connor Simpson	CF	(England)	Guisborough	20	1	0	Hartlepool United	11 January 2018	Undisclosed	2020
50	Kevin O'Connor	LB	(Republic of Ireland)	Enniscorthy	23	9	0	Cork City	24 July 2017	Undisclosed	2020
	Graham Burke	SS	(Republic of Ireland)	Dublin	26	15	2	Shamrock Rovers	1 July 2018	Undisclosed	2021

- All appearances and goals up to date as of 22 July 2020.

=== Statistics ===
As of 22 July 2020

No.	Pos	Nat	Player	Total		Championship		FA Cup		League Cup	
No.	Pos	Nat	Player	Apps	Goals	Apps	Goals	Apps	Goals	Apps	Goals
1	GK	(England) ENG	Declan Rudd	46	0	46+0	0	0+0	0	0+0	0
2	DF	(England) ENG	Darnell Fisher	28	0	25+1	0	1+0	0	1+0	0
4	MF	(England) ENG	Ben Pearson	37	1	37+0	1	0+0	0	0+0	0
5	DF	(England) ENG	Tom Clarke	11	0	7+3	0	0+0	0	1+0	0
6	DF	(England) ENG	Ben Davies	38	0	36+0	0	1+0	0	1+0	0
7	MF	(England) ENG	Tom Bayliss	5	0	0+1	0	1+0	0	2+1	0
8	MF	(Republic of Ireland) IRL	Alan Browne	45	4	34+8	4	0+0	0	3+0	0
9	FW	(England) ENG	Louis Moult	2	1	2+0	1	0+0	0	0+0	0
10	MF	(England) ENG	Josh Harrop	35	8	15+16	5	1+0	1	2+1	2
11	MF	(Jamaica) JAM	Daniel Johnson	33	12	31+1	12	0+0	0	1+0	0
12	MF	(Scotland) SCO	Paul Gallagher	32	6	22+10	6	0+0	0	0+0	0
14	DF	(England) ENG	Jordan Storey	14	0	7+3	0	1+0	0	3+0	0
15	DF	(Republic of Ireland) IRL	Joe Rafferty	32	1	27+1	1	1+0	0	2+1	0
16	DF	(Wales) WAL	Andrew Hughes	27	0	27+0	0	0+0	0	0+0	0
18	MF	(England) ENG	Ryan Ledson	17	0	8+5	0	1+0	0	3+0	0
20	FW	(England) ENG	Jayden Stockley	34	4	9+22	4	1+0	0	1+1	0
21	DF	(Germany) GER	Patrick Bauer	41	3	41+0	3	0+0	0	0+0	0
23	DF	(England) ENG	Paul Huntington	10	1	8+1	0	0+0	0	1+0	1
24	FW	(Republic of Ireland) IRL	Sean Maguire	43	5	35+8	5	0+0	0	0+0	0
25	GK	(England) ENG	Connor Ripley	4	0	0+0	0	1+0	0	3+0	0
29	FW	(England) ENG	Tom Barkhuizen	44	11	32+9	9	0+0	0	3+0	2
31	FW	(England) ENG	Scott Sinclair	18	3	11+7	3	0+0	0	0+0	0
35	FW	(England) ENG	David Nugent	25	1	11+13	1	0+0	0	0+1	0
39	FW	(Wales) WAL	Billy Bodin	21	3	12+7	2	1+0	1	0+1	0
44	MF	(England) ENG	Brad Potts	35	2	14+17	2	1+0	0	3+0	0
Players out on loan:
17	MF	(England) ENG	Josh Ginnelly	4	0	0+1	0	0+0	0	1+2	0
33	FW	(England) ENG	Ethan Walker	1	0	0+0	0	0+0	0	0+1	0
Players who left the club:
19	MF	(England) ENG	Andre Green	6	1	0+4	0	0+0	0	2+0	1

==== Goals record ====
As of 22 July 2020

Rank	No.	Nat.	Po.	Name	Championship	FA Cup	League Cup	Total
1	11	(Jamaica)	CM	Daniel Johnson	12	0	0	12
2	29	(England)	RW	Tom Barkhuizen	9	0	2	11
3	10	(England)	AM	Josh Harrop	5	1	2	8
4	12	(Scotland)	CM	Paul Gallagher	6	0	0	6
5	24	(Republic of Ireland)	CF	Sean Maguire	5	0	0	5
6	8	(Republic of Ireland)	CM	Alan Browne	4	0	0	4
6	20	(England)	CF	Jayden Stockley	4	0	0	4
8	21	(Germany)	CB	Patrick Bauer	3	0	0	3
8	31	(England)	LW	Scott Sinclair	3	0	0	3
8	39	(Wales)	RW	Billy Bodin	2	1	0	3
11	44	(England)	CM	Brad Potts	2	0	0	2
12	4	(England)	DM	Ben Pearson	1	0	0	1
12	9	(England)	CF	Louis Moult	1	0	0	1
12	15	(Republic of Ireland)	LB	Joe Rafferty	1	0	0	1
12	19	(England)	LW	Andre Green	0	0	1	1
12	23	(England)	CB	Paul Huntington	0	0	1	1
12	35	(England)	CF	David Nugent	1	0	0	1
Total					59	2	6	67

==== Disciplinary record ====
As of 22 July 2020

Rank	No.	Nat.	Po.	Name	Championship			FA Cup			League Cup			Total		
Rank	No.	Nat.	Po.	Name	Booked	(yellow card) (yellow-red card)	Sent off (straight red)	Booked	(yellow card) (yellow-red card)	Sent off (straight red)	Booked	(yellow card) (yellow-red card)	Sent off (straight red)	Booked	(yellow card) (yellow-red card)	Sent off (straight red)
1	2	(England)	RB	Darnell Fisher	11	0	0	1	0	0	0	0	0	12	0	0
2	4	(England)	CM	Ben Pearson	9	0	1	0	0	0	0	0	0	9	0	1
3	10	(England)	AM	Josh Harrop	4	0	0	0	0	0	1	0	0	5	0	0
3	12	(Scotland)	AM	Paul Gallagher	5	0	0	0	0	0	0	0	0	5	0	0
5	20	(England)	CF	Jayden Stockley	4	0	0	0	0	0	0	0	0	4	0	0
6	1	(England)	GK	Declan Rudd	3	0	0	0	0	0	0	0	0	3	0	0
6	8	(Republic of Ireland)	CM	Alan Browne	3	0	0	0	0	0	0	0	0	3	0	0
6	11	(Jamaica)	AM	Daniel Johnson	3	0	0	0	0	0	0	0	0	3	0	0
6	15	(Republic of Ireland)	LB	Joe Rafferty	2	0	1	0	0	0	0	0	0	2	0	1
6	18	(England)	CM	Ryan Ledson	2	0	0	1	0	0	0	0	0	3	0	0
11	5	(England)	CB	Tom Clarke	2	0	0	0	0	0	0	0	0	2	0	0
11	6	(England)	CB	Ben Davies	2	0	0	0	0	0	0	0	0	2	0	0
11	16	(Wales)	LB	Andrew Hughes	2	0	0	0	0	0	0	0	0	2	0	0
11	21	(Germany)	CB	Patrick Bauer	2	0	0	0	0	0	0	0	0	2	0	0
11	23	(England)	CB	Paul Huntington	2	0	0	0	0	0	0	0	0	2	0	0
11	29	(England)	RW	Tom Barkhuizen	2	0	0	0	0	0	0	0	0	2	0	0
17	24	(Republic of Ireland)	CF	Sean Maguire	1	0	0	0	0	0	0	0	0	1	0	0
17	25	(England)	GK	Connor Ripley	0	0	0	1	0	0	0	0	0	1	0	0
17	35	(England)	CF	David Nugent	1	0	0	0	0	0	0	0	0	1	0	0
17	39	(Wales)	RW	Billy Bodin	1	0	0	0	0	0	0	0	0	1	0	0
17	44	(England)	CM	Brad Potts	1	0	0	0	0	0	0	0	0	1	0	0
Total					62	0	2	3	0	0	1	0	0	66	0	2

== Transfers ==
=== Transfers in ===
Date	Position	Nationality	Name	From	Fee	Ref.
1 July 2019	CB	(Germany)	Patrick Bauer	(England) Charlton Athletic	Free transfer	
17 July 2019	CF	(England)	David Nugent	(England) Derby County	Free transfer	
2 August 2019	CM	(England)	Tom Bayliss	(England) Coventry City	£2,000,000	
8 January 2020	LW	(England)	Scott Sinclair	(Scotland) Celtic	Undisclosed	

=== Loans in ===
Date from	Position	Nationality	Name	From	Date until	Ref.
1 August 2019	LW	(England)	Andre Green	(England) Aston Villa	30 June 2020	

=== Loans out ===
Date from	Position	Nationality	Name	To	Date until	Ref.
1 July 2019	GK	(Wales)	Chris Maxwell	(Scotland) Hibernian	22 January 2020	
31 July 2019	SS	(Republic of Ireland)	Graham Burke	(Republic of Ireland) Shamrock Rovers	30 June 2020	
3 August 2019	LB	(England)	Josh Earl	(England) Bolton Wanderers	5 January 2020	
16 August 2019	LB	(Scotland)	Jack Armer	(England) Lancaster City	1 January 2020	
2 September 2019	CF	(England)	Connor Simpson	(England) Accrington Stanley	30 June 2020	
12 December 2019	CF	(England)	Ethan Walker	(England) Altrincham	30 June 2020	
7 January 2020	LB	(Republic of Ireland)	Kevin O'Connor	(Republic of Ireland) Waterford	30 June 2020	
13 January 2020	LB	(England)	Josh Earl	(England) Ipswich Town	30 June 2020	
15 January 2020	LB	(Scotland)	Jack Armer	(England) Lancaster City	30 June 2020	
16 January 2020	LW	(England)	Josh Ginnelly	(England) Bristol Rovers	30 June 2020	
21 January 2020	DM	(England)	Jack Baxter	(England) Clitheroe	30 June 2020	
24 January 2020	CM	(Republic of Ireland)	Adam O'Reilly	(England) Stalybridge Celtic	30 June 2020	
24 January 2020	CF	(England)	Ethan Walker	(England) Stalybridge Celtic	30 June 2020	
27 February 2020	GK	(Wales)	Michael Crowe	(England) Bamber Bridge	30 June 2020	
28 February 2020	AM	(England)	Tyrhys Dolan	(England) Clitheroe	30 June 2020	
28 February 2020	LB	(England)	Lincoln McFayden	(England) Clitheroe	30 June 2020	

=== Transfers out ===
Date	Position	Nationality	Name	To	Fee	Ref.
1 July 2019	CB	(Republic of Ireland)	Andy Boyle	(Republic of Ireland) Dundalk	Released	
1 July 2019	FW	(England)	Darren Brannigan	Free agent	Released	
1 July 2019	GK	(England)	James Cottam	(England) Fleetwood Town	Undisclosed	
1 July 2019	CF	(England)	Michael Howard	(England) Morecambe	Released	
1 July 2019	MF	(England)	Jerome Jolly	Free agent	Released	
1 July 2019	GK	(England)	Callum Lenton	Free agent	Released	
1 July 2019	DF	(Republic of the Congo)	Precieux Ngongo	(Scotland) Gretna 2008	Released	
1 July 2019	CM	(England)	Josh Pollard	Free agent	Released	
1 July 2019	LM	(England)	Ben Pringle	(England) Gillingham	Released	
1 July 2019	MF	(England)	Lewis Simmons	Free agent	Released	
1 July 2019	LB	(England)	Tommy Spurr	Retirement	Retired	
1 July 2019	CB	(England)	Tom Stead	(England) Chorley	Released	
1 July 2019	RB	(Belgium)	Marnick Vermijl	(Netherlands) MVV Maastricht	Free Transfer	
12 July 2019	LW	(Republic of Ireland)	Callum Robinson	(England) Sheffield United	£7,020,000	
22 January 2020	GK	(Wales)	Chris Maxwell	(England) Blackpool	Mutual consent	

== Pre-season ==
PNE announced five pre-season fixtures on 5 June 2019. A home friendly against Southampton was later confirmed and Bolton Wanderers was also added.

6 July 2019 Friendly	Bamber Bridge	0–2	Preston North End	Bamber Bridge
15:00 BST		Report	Clarke 10'; Moult 34'	Stadium: Sir Tom Finney Stadium; Attendance: 2,000; Referee: Graham Salisbury

8 July 2019 Friendly	Cork City	0–2	Preston North End	Cork, Ireland
19:00 BST		Report	Stockley 39'; Ginnelly 85'	Stadium: Turners Cross; Attendance: 1,470; Referee: Anthony Buttimer

13 July 2019 Friendly	AFC Fylde	0–4	Preston North End	Medlar-with-Wesham
15:00 BST		Report	Maguire 11', 16', 60'; Bodin 39'	Stadium: Mill Farm; Attendance: 2,109; Referee: David McNamara

16 July 2019 Friendly	Chorley	0–2	Preston North End	Chorley
19:00 BST		Report	Browne 61'; Burke 78'	Stadium: Victory Park; Attendance: 1,351; Referee: Leigh Doughty

20 July 2019 Friendly	Preston North End	1–3	Southampton	Preston
15:00 BST	Bodin 19'	Report	Ings 11', 44'; Vokins 82'	Stadium: Deepdale; Attendance: 4,767; Referee: Peter Bankes

23 July 2019 Friendly	Preston North End	1–1	Accrington Stanley	Leyland
19:45 BST	Bauer 39'	Report	Bishop 45'	Stadium: County Ground; Attendance: 1,011; Referee: Graham Salisbury

26 July 2019 Friendly	Fleetwood Town	1–0	Preston North End	Fleetwood
19:45 BST	Hunter 59'	Report		Stadium: Highbury Stadium; Attendance: 1,920; Referee: Peter Bankes

27 July 2019 Friendly	Preston North End	2–1	Newcastle United	Preston
15:00 BST	Gallagher 60' (pen.), 71' (pen.)	Report	Shelvey 39'	Stadium: Deepdale; Attendance: 4,982; Referee: Michael Salisbury

== Competitions ==
=== League table ===
Pos	Team	Pld	W	D	L	GF	GA	GD	Pts	Promotion, qualification or relegation
6	Swansea City	46	18	16	12	62	53	+9	70	Qualification for Championship play-offs (Note: Four teams play for one spot and promotion to the Premier League.)
7	Nottingham Forest	46	18	16	12	58	50	+8	70	
8	Millwall	46	17	17	12	57	51	+6	68	
9	Preston North End	46	18	12	16	59	54	+5	66	
10	Derby County	46	17	13	16	62	64	−2	64	
11	Blackburn Rovers	46	17	12	17	66	63	+3	63	
12	Bristol City	46	17	12	17	60	65	−5	63	

Source: EFL Official Website
Rules for classification: 1) Points; 2) Goal difference; 3) Number of goals scored; 4) Head-to-head results; 5) Wins; 6) Away goals; 7) Penalty points (sec 9.5); 8) 12-point sending off offences

==== Result summary ====
Overall								Home						Away					
Pld	W	D	L	GF	GA	GD	Pts	W	D	L	GF	GA	GD	W	D	L	GF	GA	GD
46	18	12	16	59	54	+5	66	12	4	7	39	29	+10	6	8	9	20	25	−5

Last updated: 22 July 2020.
Source: BBC Sport

==== Results by matchday ====
Matchday	1	2	3	4	5	6	7	8	9	10	11	12	13	14	15	16	17	18	19	20	21	22	23	24	25	26	27	28	29	30	31	32	33	34	35	36	37	38	39	40	41	42	43	44	45	46
Ground	A	H	A	H	H	A	H	A	H	A	H	A	H	H	A	H	A	A	H	A	H	H	A	A	H	H	A	H	A	H	A	A	H	H	A	A	H	A	H	H	A	A	H	A	H	A
Result	L	W	L	W	W	D	W	W	D	D	W	L	D	W	W	W	L	L	L	L	W	W	D	D	L	L	D	W	W	D	W	W	L	W	L	L	L	D	L	L	D	W	D	L	W	D
Position	23	10	16	10	6	7	5	3	5	6	3	6	6	2	2	2	3	5	6	7	6	3	4	6	7	9	10	9	6	7	6	6	6	6	6	6	6	6	7	8	8	8	8	9	8	9

Updated to match(es) played on 22 July 2020. Source: BBC Sport
A = Away; H = Home; W = Win; D = Draw; L = Loss

==== Matches ====
On Thursday, 20 June 2019, the EFL Championship fixtures were revealed.

3 August 2019 1	Millwall	1–0	Preston North End	Bermondsey
15:00 BST	Williams (yellow card) 30'; Wallace 33'; Smith (yellow card) 62'	Report	Hughes (yellow card) 49'; Stockley (yellow card) 64'; Browne (yellow card) 87'	Stadium: The Den; Attendance: 14,923; Referee: Steve Martin

10 August 2019 2	Preston North End	3–0	Wigan Athletic	Preston
15:00 BST	Maguire 6'; Pearson (yellow card) 20'; Moult 39'; Gallagher 54'	Report	Byrne (yellow card) 6'; Macleod (yellow card) 16'	Stadium: Deepdale; Attendance: 14,789; Referee: Jeremy Simpson

17 August 2019 3	Swansea City	3–2	Preston North End	Swansea
15:00 BST	Bastón 45+4', 69'; Byers 63'	Report	Rafferty 11'; Fisher (yellow card) 18'; Johnson 67' (pen.)	Stadium: Liberty Stadium; Attendance: 15,250; Referee: Dean Whitestone

21 August 2019 4	Preston North End	3–1	Stoke City	Preston
19:45 BST	Johnson 7'; Pearson (yellow card) 16'; Bodin 25'; Harrop (yellow card) 65' (goal) 69'; Fisher (yellow card) 78'	Report	McClean (yellow card) 78' (goal) 89'; Collins (yellow card) 80'	Stadium: Deepdale; Attendance: 11,973; Referee: John Brooks
Note: Live on Sky Sports

24 August 2019 5	Preston North End	2–1	Sheffield Wednesday	Preston
15:00 BST	Johnson 32' (pen.), 65' (pen.)	Report	Odubajo (yellow card) 64'; Fletcher 78'; Reach (yellow card) 84'; Fox (yellow card) 90+5'	Stadium: Deepdale; Attendance: 15,715; Referee: Robert Jones

31 August 2019 6	Nottingham Forest	1–1	Preston North End	West Bridgford
15:00 BST	Grabban (yellow card) 70'; Silva (yellow card) 74'; Adomah 79'; Sow (yellow card) 83'; Jenkinson (yellow card) 89'	Report	Bodin 40'; Harrop (yellow card) 50'	Stadium: City Ground; Attendance: 27,249; Referee: Geoff Eltringham

14 September 2019 7	Preston North End	2–0	Brentford	Preston
15:00 BST	Maguire 4'; Fisher (yellow card) 60'; Barkhuizen 70'; Johnson (yellow card) 78'	Report	Nørgaard (yellow card) 78'	Stadium: Deepdale; Attendance: 12,873; Referee: David Coote

21 September 2019 8	Birmingham City	0–1	Preston North End	Bordesley
15:00 BST		Report	Maguire 23'	Stadium: St Andrew's Trillion Trophy Stadium; Attendance: 20,806; Referee: Steve Martin

28 September 2019 9	Preston North End	3–3	Bristol City	Preston
15:00 BST	Fisher (yellow card) 39'; Gallagher 45+2' (pen.); Johnson 51' (pen.); Bauer 70'	Report	Moore 29'; Weimann 36' (yellow card) 82'; Baker 60'	Stadium: Deepdale; Attendance: 12,005; Referee: Andy Davies

1 October 2019 10	Middlesbrough	1–1	Preston North End	Middlesbrough
19:45 BST	Fisher 42' (o.g.); Clayton (yellow card) 86'; Fletcher (yellow card) 90+5'	Report	Harrop 40'; Pearson (yellow card) 65'; Fisher (yellow card) 90+2'	Stadium: Riverside Stadium; Attendance: 17,961; Referee: Darren England

5 October 2019 11	Preston North End	5–1	Barnsley	Preston
15:00 BST	Johnson 31', 61'; Barkhuizen 50'; Pearson 63'; Browne (yellow card) 67'; Harrop 77'	Report	McGeehan (yellow card) 27' (goal) 43'; Williams (yellow card) 65'; Wilks (yellow card) 67'	Stadium: Deepdale; Attendance: 12,431; Referee: Gavin Ward

19 October 2019 12	Reading	1–0	Preston North End	Reading
15:00 BST	Obita (yellow card) 8'; Miazga 90+8' (yellow card) 90+8'	Report	Nugent (yellow card) 16'; Pearson (yellow card) 90+1'	Stadium: Madejski Stadium; Attendance: 14,135; Referee: Dean Whitestone

22 October 2019 13	Preston North End	1–1	Leeds United	Preston
19:45 BST	Barkhuizen 74'; Fisher (yellow card) 86'	Report	Nketiah 87'	Stadium: Deepdale; Attendance: 18,275; Referee: Kevin Friend

26 October 2019 14	Preston North End	3–2	Blackburn Rovers	Preston
15:00 BST	Barkhuizen 53', 82'; Johnson 65' (pen.)	Report	Rudd 1' (o.g.); Gallagher 11' (yellow card) 68'; Dack (yellow card) 87'	Stadium: Deepdale; Attendance: 19,165; Referee: Stephen Martin

3 November 2019 15	Charlton Athletic	0–1	Preston North End	Charlton
12:00 GMT	Sarr (yellow card) 25'; Kayal (yellow card) 65'; Bonne (yellow card) 90+8'	Report	Gallagher 58' (pen.); Pearson (yellow card) 66'; Fisher (yellow card) 74'; Stockley (yellow card) 80'; Barkhuizen (yellow card) 81'; Rudd (yellow card) 90+3'	Stadium: The Valley; Referee: David Webb

9 November 2019 16	Preston North End	3–1	Huddersfield Town	Preston
15:00 GMT	Stockley 4' (yellow card) 62'; Ledson (yellow card) 18'; Browne 33'; Fisher (yellow card) 45+5'; Gallagher 50' (pen.); Maguire (yellow card) 86'	Report	Bacuna (yellow card) 45+5' (goal) 74'; O'Brien (yellow card) 62'	Stadium: Deepdale; Attendance: 16,038; Referee: Geoff Eltringham

23 November 2019 17	Derby County	1–0	Preston North End	Derby
15:00 GMT	Waghorn 33'	Report	Fisher (yellow card) 23'; Rafferty (yellow card) 41'	Stadium: Pride Park Stadium; Attendance: 27,417; Referee: Tim Robinson

27 November 2019 18	Hull City	4–0	Preston North End	Kingston upon Hull
19:45 GMT	Bowen 30', 77'; Magennis 48' (pen.); Grosicki 51'; Batty (yellow card) 65'	Report	Gallagher (yellow card) 56'	Stadium: KCOM Stadium; Attendance: 9,826; Referee: Jonathan Moss

2 December 2019 19	Preston North End	0–1	West Bromwich Albion	Preston
19:45 GMT		Report	Ajayi (yellow card) 50'; Austin 90' (pen.)	Stadium: Deepdale; Attendance: 13,015; Referee: Oliver Langford

7 December 2019 20	Queens Park Rangers	2–0	Preston North End	Shepherd's Bush
15:00 GMT	Eze 17', 67' (pen.); Scowen (yellow card) 79'; Osayi-Samuel (yellow card) 90'	Report	Rudd (yellow card) 66'; Bodin (yellow card) 90+2'	Stadium: Kiyan Prince Foundation Stadium; Attendance: 12,179; Referee: Andy Davies

10 December 2019 21	Preston North End	2–1	Fulham	Preston
19:45 GMT	Maguire 23'; Pearson (yellow card) 34'; Rafferty (red card) 45'; Nugent 52'; Browne (yellow card) 75'; Huntington (yellow card) 76'; Potts (yellow card) 83'	Report	Odoi (red card) 28'; Mitrović 81'; Onomah (yellow card) 88'	Stadium: Deepdale; Attendance: 10,093; Referee: Keith Stroud

14 December 2019 22	Preston North End	2–1	Luton Town	Preston
15:00 GMT	Gallagher (penalty missed) 5' 5'; Fisher (yellow card) 67'; Stockley 84'	Report	Collins 43' (pen.); LuaLua (yellow card) 66'; Berry (yellow card) 81'; Bradley (yellow card) 90+6'	Stadium: Deepdale; Attendance: 12,083; Referee: Gavin Ward

21 December 2019 23	Cardiff City	0–0	Preston North End	Cardiff
12:30 GMT	Tomlin (yellow card) 45+1'	Report	Gallagher (yellow card) 21'; Clarke (yellow card) 35'	Stadium: Cardiff City Stadium; Attendance: 22,625; Referee: Jeremy Simpson

26 December 2019 24	Leeds United	1–1	Preston North End	Beeston, Leeds
17:15 BST	Phillips (yellow card) 73'; Klich (yellow card) 80'; Dallas (yellow card) 80' (goal) 89'	Report	Browne 22'; Pearson (yellow card) 68'; Huntington (yellow card) 72'; Ledson (yellow card) 75'; Clarke (yellow card) 80'	Stadium: Elland Road; Attendance: 35,638; Referee: Darren Bond

29 December 2019 25	Preston North End	0–2	Reading	Preston
15:00 GMT		Report	Swift 12'; João 16'	Stadium: Deepdale; Attendance: 13,680; Referee: Jarred Gillett

1 January 2020 26	Preston North End	0–2	Middlesbrough	Preston
15:00 GMT		Report	Gestede 40'; Fletcher 62'; Clayton (yellow card) 64'; Johnson (yellow card) 66'	Stadium: Deepdale; Attendance: 13,824; Referee: John Brooks

11 January 2020 27	Blackburn Rovers	1–1	Preston North End	Blackburn
15:00 GMT	Armstrong 3'; Lenihan (yellow card) 51'; Travis (yellow card) 67'	Report	Harrop 17'	Stadium: Ewood Park; Attendance: 19,963; Referee: James Linington

18 January 2020 28	Preston North End	2–1	Charlton Athletic	Preston
15:00 GMT	Harrop 31'; Bauer 52'; Barkhuizen (yellow card) 62'	Report	Green 5'	Stadium: Deepdale; Attendance: 12,358; Referee: Dean Whitestone

21 January 2020 29	Barnsley	0–3	Preston North End	Barnsley
19:45 GMT	Woodrow (yellow card) 83'	Report	Barkhuizen 19', 45'; Johnson 34'; Harrop (yellow card) 57'	Stadium: Oakwell; Attendance: 12,207; Referee: Jeremy Simpson

1 February 2020 30	Preston North End	1–1	Swansea City	Preston
15:00 GMT	Sinclair 28'; Bauer (yellow card) 45+3'	Report	Brewster 33' (yellow card) 55'; Bidwell (yellow card) 54'; Celina (yellow card) 71'	Stadium: Deepdale; Attendance: 12,502; Referee: Geoff Eltringham

8 February 2020 31	Wigan Athletic	1–2	Preston North End	Wigan
12:30 GMT	Dunkley 57' (yellow card) 66'	Report	Barkhuizen 7'; Johnson 48'; Rudd (yellow card) 76'; Fisher (yellow card) 84'; Stockley (yellow card) 90+2'	Stadium: DW Stadium; Attendance: 12,439; Referee: Darren England

12 February 2020 32	Stoke City	0–2	Preston North End	Stoke-on-Trent
20:00 GMT	Allen (yellow card) 38'; McClean (yellow card) 62'; Batth (yellow card) 90'	Report	Johnson (yellow card) 24'; Browne 58'; Pearson (yellow card) 63'; Barkhuizen 75'	Stadium: bet365 Stadium; Attendance: 20,418; Referee: John Brooks

15 February 2020 33	Preston North End	0–1	Millwall	Preston
15:00 GMT	Johnson (yellow card) 50'; Pearson (yellow card) 83'; Gallagher (yellow card) 85'	Report	Hutchinson 78'	Stadium: Deepdale; Attendance: 12,468; Referee: Tony Harrington

22 February 2020 34	Preston North End	2–1	Hull City	Preston
15:00 GMT	Gallagher 67' (pen.); Browne 71'; Stockley (yellow card) 90+7'	Report	Wilks 40'; Honeyman (yellow card) 56'; Pennington (yellow card) 81' de Wijs (yellow card) 90+3'	Stadium: Deepdale; Attendance: 12,342; Referee: Stephen Martin

25 February 2020 35	West Bromwich Albion	2–0	Preston North End	West Bromwich
20:00 GMT	Robson-Kanu 6'; Livermore 45'	Report	Fisher (red card) 64'	Stadium: The Hawthorns; Attendance: 22,150; Referee: Kevin Friend

29 February 2020 36	Fulham	2–0	Preston North End	Fulham
15:00 GMT	Nugent 58' (o.g.); Kamara 90+5'	Report		Stadium: Craven Cottage; Attendance: 19,020; Referee: David Webb

7 March 2020 37	Preston North End	1–3	Queens Park Rangers	Preston
15:00 GMT	Johnson 19' (pen.); Gallagher (yellow card) 44'; Davies (yellow card) 61'	Report	Cameron (yellow card) 56' (yellow-red card) 67'; Hall 61'; Manning 78'; Amos (yellow card) 83'; Eze 84'	Stadium: Deepdale; Attendance: 12,378; Referee: Dean Whitestone

20 June 2020 38	Luton Town	1–1	Preston North End	Luton
15:00 BST	Rea (yellow card) 50'; McManaman 87'	Report	Sinclair 52'	Stadium: Kenilworth Road; Attendance: 0 Referee: John Brooks
Note: Season was suspended until 3 April 2020, due to the COVID-19 pandemic. The match was rescheduled to 20 June.

27 June 2020 39	Preston North End	1–3	Cardiff City	Preston
12:30 BST	Davies (yellow card) 67'; Johnson 73'	Report	Sanderson (yellow card) 54'; Ralls 69'; Mendez-Laing 82'; Smithies (yellow card) 90'; Glatzel 90+1'	Stadium: Deepdale; Attendance: 0 Referee: Oliver Langford
Note: Season was suspended until 3 April 2020, due to the COVID-19 pandemic. The match was rescheduled to 27 June.

1 July 2020 40	Preston North End	0–1	Derby County	Preston
17:00 BST		Report	Rooney 18'	Stadium: Deepdale; Attendance: 0 Referee: Jarred Gillett
Note: Season was suspended until 3 April 2020, due to the COVID-19 pandemic. The match was rescheduled to 1 July.

4 July 2020 41	Huddersfield Town	0–0	Preston North End	Huddersfield
15:00 BST		Report		Stadium: John Smith's Stadium; Attendance: 0 Referee: Darren Bond
Note: On 3 April, the English Football League decided to postpone all football until safe to do so due to the COVID-19 pandemic. The match was rescheduled to 4 July.

8 July 2020 42	Sheffield Wednesday	1–3	Preston North End	Owlerton
19:45 BST	Pelupessy (yellow card) 10'; Murphy 58'; Nuhiu (yellow card) 85'	Report	Sinclair 78'; Stockley 87'; Potts 90+6'	Stadium: Hillsborough; Attendance: 0 Referee: Tony Harrington
Note: On 3 April, the English Football League decided to postpone all football until safe to do so due to the COVID-19 pandemic. The match was rescheduled to 8 July.

11 July 2020 43	Preston North End	1–1	Nottingham Forest	Preston
15:00 BST	Stockley 15'; Bauer (yellow card) 16'; Hughes (yellow card) 49'	Report	Grabban 5' (pen.)	Stadium: Deepdale; Attendance: 0 Referee: Jeremy Simpson
Note: On 3 April, the English Football League decided to postpone all football until safe to do so due to the COVID-19 pandemic. The match was rescheduled to 11 July.

15 July 2020 44	Brentford	1–0	Preston North End	Brentford
17:00 BST	Watkins 4', (yellow card) 90+3'; Benrahma (yellow card) 63'	Report	Rafferty (yellow card) 53'	Stadium: Griffin Park; Attendance: 0 Referee: Darren England
Note: On 3 April, the English Football League decided to postpone all football until safe to do so due to the COVID-19 pandemic. The match was rescheduled to 15 July.

18 July 2020 45	Preston North End	2–0	Birmingham City	Preston
15:00 BST	Harrop (yellow card) 21'; Bauer 43'; Gallagher (yellow card) 52'; Potts 87'	Report	Šunjić (yellow card) 28'; Bellingham (yellow card) 67'	Stadium: Deepdale; Attendance: 0 Referee: Steve Martin
Note: On 3 April, the English Football League decided to postpone all football until safe to do so due to the COVID-19 pandemic. The match was rescheduled to 18 July.

22 July 2020 46	Bristol City	1–1	Preston North End	Ashton Gate
19:30 BST	Diédhiou 48'	Report	Maguire 16'	Stadium: Ashton Gate Stadium; Attendance: 0 Referee: Andy Woolmer
Note: On 3 April, the English Football League decided to postpone all football until safe to do so due to the COVID-19 pandemic. The match was rescheduled to 22 July.

=== FA Cup ===
The third round draw was made live on BBC Two from Etihad Stadium, Micah Richards and Tony Adams conducted the draw.

4 January 2020 Third round	Preston North End	2–4	Norwich City	Preston
15:00 GMT	Bodin 48'; Harrop 84'	Report	Idah 2', 38', 61' (pen.); Hernández 28'	Stadium: Deepdale; Attendance: 7,616; Referee: Martin Atkinson

=== EFL Cup ===
The first round draw was made on 20 June. The second round draw was made on 13 August 2019 following the conclusion of all but one first-round matches. The third round draw was confirmed on 28 August 2019, live on Sky Sports.

13 August 2019 First round	Bradford City	0–4	Preston North End	Bradford
19:45 BST		report	Green 13'; Barkhuizen 19', 53'; Harrop 71'	Stadium: Valley Parade; Attendance: 3,456; Referee: Matt Donohue

27 August 2019 Second round	Preston North End	2–2 (5–4 p)	Hull City	Preston
19:45 BST	Huntington 20'; Harrop 26'	Report	Magennis 34' (pen.); Bowen 90+5'	Stadium: Deepdale; Attendance: 6,093; Referee: David Webb
	Penalties
	Harrop (penalty scored); Ledson (penalty scored); Stockley (penalty scored); Bodin (penalty scored); Browne (penalty scored)		(penalty scored) Magennis; (penalty missed) Eaves; (penalty scored) Toral; (penalty scored) Lopes; (penalty scored) Stewart

24 September 2019 Third round	Preston North End	0–3	Manchester City	Preston
19:45 BST	Harrop (yellow card) 51'	Report	Sterling 19'; Gabriel Jesus 35'; Ledson 42' (o.g.)	Stadium: Deepdale; Attendance: 22,025; Referee: Lee Mason
