= Alan Browne (footballer) =

Irish footballer (born 1995)

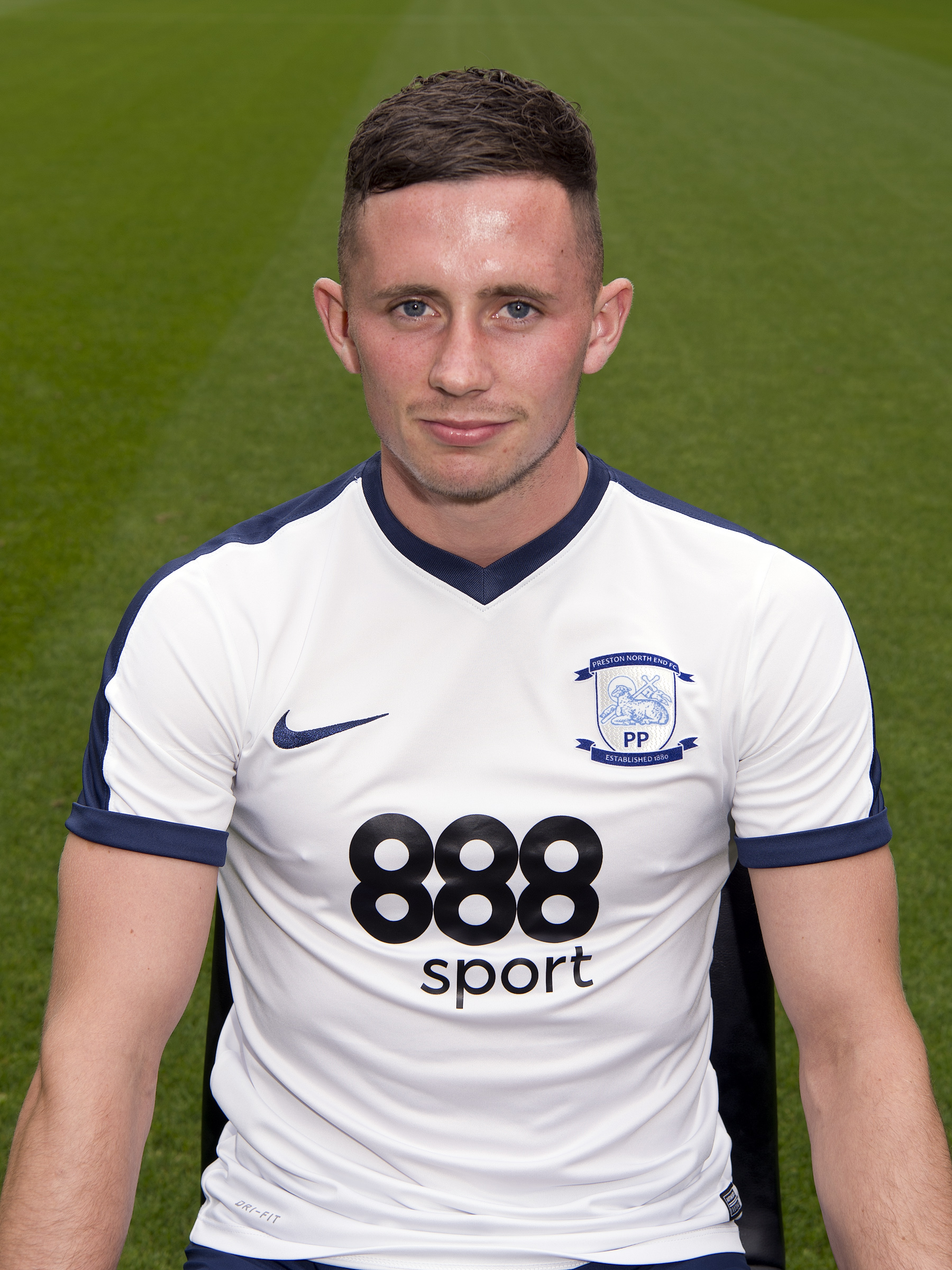
- Browne with Preston North End in 2016

Personal information
- Full name: Alan James Browne
- Date of birth: 15 April 1995 (age 31)
- Place of birth: Cork, Ireland
- Height: 1.79 m (5 ft 10 in)
- Positions: Central midfielder; utility player

Team information
- Current team: Sunderland
- Number: 8

Youth career
- –2012: Ringmahon Rangers
- 2012–2013: Cork City

Senior career*
Years	Team	Apps	(Gls)
2014–2024	Preston North End	381	(43)
2024–	Sunderland	22	(1)
2025–2026	→ Middlesbrough (loan)	38	(4)

International career^{‡}
2013–2015	Republic of Ireland U19	9	(0)
2014–2017	Republic of Ireland U21	11	(3)
2017–	Republic of Ireland	39	(5)
- * Club domestic league appearances and goals as of 16:16, 2 May 2026 (UTC) ‡ National team caps and goals as of 23:51, 31 March 2026

Alan James Browne (born 15 April 1995) is an Irish professional footballer who plays as a central midfielder for Premier League club Sunderland and the Republic of Ireland national team.

== Club career ==
=== Cork City ===
Browne joined the Cork City U19 squad from Ringmahon Rangers before the 2012 season, graduating to the senior squad the following season. He was named on the substitutes' bench twice in the 2013 season for games against Sligo Rovers and Drogheda United, but he failed to make a first-team appearance for the club before leaving.

=== Preston North End ===
Browne signed an 18-month contract with Preston North End in League One, joining them on 1 January 2014. He made his first-team debut on 25 March 2014, coming on as a substitute in a 3–1 victory against Peterborough United with the score at 1–1, with a contribution and work ethic that drew praise from manager Simon Grayson.

In 2015, Browne was involved in the play-off final win, which saw Preston promoted to the Championship.

Browne became a major part of the Preston squad throughout the 2017–18 season, scoring eight goals. This led to him earning the clubs Player of the Year award.

From the 2020–21 season Browne was appointed club captain following the departure of Tom Clarke. On 13 January 2021, Browne signed a new three-and-a-half-year deal with the club, seeing him under contract until the end of the 2023–24 season.

On 27 January 2024, Browne made his 400th appearance for Preston North End against Millwall.

On 1 July 2024, Preston North End announced that Browne had departed the club having rejected the offer of a new three-year deal. Following Browne's departure, reports circulated that he had rejected the offer of a new contract due to disagreements with then manager Ryan Lowe, who subsequently resigned one game into the 2024–2025 season.

=== Sunderland ===
Browne signed for EFL Championship side Sunderland on a three-year deal in July 2024. He scored his first goal for the club in a 3–1 victory against Portsmouth.

==== Loan to Middlesbrough ====
Following Sunderland's promotion to the Premier League, on 1 September 2025 it was announced that Browne had signed for EFL Championship club Middlesbrough on a season-long loan deal. On 4 January 2026, Browne scored his first goal for the club in a 4–0 win against Southampton at the Riverside Stadium. He scored a further two goals across the month, being named EFL Championship Player of the Month.

== International career ==
On 24 March 2021, Browne scored his first competitive goal for Ireland, a header to give them the lead in a 3–2 defeat away to Serbia in the 2022 FIFA World Cup qualifiers.

== Career statistics ==
=== Club ===
As of match played 28 October 2026

Appearances and goals by club, season and competition
Club	Season	League			National cup (Note: Includes FA Cup)		League cup (Note: Includes Football League/EFL Cup)		Europe		Other		Total	
Club	Season	Division	Apps	Goals	Apps	Goals	Apps	Goals	Apps	Goals	Apps	Goals	Apps	Goals
Cork City	2013	LOI Premier Division	0	0	0	0	0	0	—		—		0	0
Preston North End	2013–14	League One	8	1	0	0	—		—		1 (Note: Appearance in League One play-offs)	0	9	1
Preston North End	2014–15	League One	20	3	4	0	2	0	—		6 (Note: Four appearances in Football League Trophy, two appearances in League One play-offs)	0	32	3
Preston North End	2015–16	Championship	36	3	1	0	3	0	—		—		40	3
Preston North End	2016–17	Championship	31	0	1	0	3	0	—		—		35	0
Preston North End	2017–18	Championship	44	7	2	2	1	0	—		—		47	9
Preston North End	2018–19	Championship	38	12	1	0	2	0	—		—		41	12
Preston North End	2019–20	Championship	43	4	0	0	3	0	—		—		46	4
Preston North End	2020–21	Championship	38	4	1	0	2	0	—		—		41	4
Preston North End	2021–22	Championship	39	4	1	0	1	0	—		—		41	4
Preston North End	2022–23	Championship	36	1	2	1	1	0	—		—		39	2
Preston North End	2023–24	Championship	41	4	1	0	1	0	—		—		43	4
Preston North End	Total		374	43	14	3	19	0	—		7	0	414	46
Sunderland	2024–25	Championship	22	1	0	0	0	0	—		1 (Note: Appearance(s) in Championship play-offs)	0	23	1
Sunderland	2025–26	Premier League	0	0	—		0	0	—		—		0	0
Sunderland	2026–27	Premier League	0	0	0	0	2	0	0	0	—		2	0
Sunderland	Total		22	1	0	0	2	0	0	0	1	0	25	1
Middlesbrough (loan)	2025–26	Championship	38	4	1	0	—		—		3	0	42	4
Career total			434	48	15	3	21	0	0	0	11	0	481	51

=== International ===
As of match played 31 March 2026

Appearances and goals by national team and year
National team	Year	Apps	Goals
Republic of Ireland	2017	1	0
Republic of Ireland	2018	2	0
Republic of Ireland	2019	6	1
Republic of Ireland	2020	2	0
Republic of Ireland	2021	6	1
Republic of Ireland	2022	10	3
Republic of Ireland	2023	8	0
Republic of Ireland	2024	2	0
Republic of Ireland	2025	0	0
Republic of Ireland	2026	2	0
Total		39	5

As of match played 31 March 2026. Ireland score listed first, score column indicates score after each Browne goal.

International goals by date, venue, cap, opponent, score, result and competition
No.	Date	Venue	Cap	Opponent	Score	Result	Competition	Ref.
1	10 September 2019	Aviva Stadium, Dublin, Ireland	5	Bulgaria	1–0	3–1	Friendly	
2	24 March 2021	Red Star Stadium, Belgrade, Serbia	12	Serbia	1–0	2–3	2022 FIFA World Cup qualification	
3	26 March 2022	Aviva Stadium, Dublin, Ireland	18	Belgium	2–2	2–2	Friendly	
4	11 June 2022	Aviva Stadium, Dublin, Ireland	22	Scotland	1–0	3–0	2022–23 UEFA Nations League B	
5	17 November 2022	Aviva Stadium, Dublin, Ireland	26	Norway	1–1	1–2	Friendly	

== Honours ==
Preston North End

- Football League One play-offs: 2015

Sunderland

- EFL Championship play-offs: 2025

Individual

- FAI Young Player of the Year 2019
- EFL Championship Player of the Month: January 2026
