= 2018–19 Preston North End F.C. season =

English football club season

Preston North End
2018–19 season
- Manager: Alex Neil
- Stadium: Deepdale
- Championship: 14th
- FA Cup: Third round
- EFL Cup: Third round
- Top goalscorer: League: Alan Browne; Callum Robinson (12); All: Callum Robinson (13)
- Highest home attendance: 19,912 vs. Blackburn (24 November 2018, League)
- Lowest home attendance: League: 10,849 vs. Reading (15 September 2018); All: 5,095 vs. Middlesbrough (25 Sep 2018, EFL Cup R3)
- Average home league attendance: 14,160
- Biggest win: 4–0 vs. Wigan Athletic (6 October 2018, League)
- Biggest defeat: 0–3 vs. Leeds United (18 September 2018, League)
Home colours	Away colours	Third colours

The 2018–19 season is Preston North End's 139th season in existence, and their fourth consecutive season in the Championship. Along with the Championship, the club will also compete in the FA Cup and EFL Cup. The season covers the period from 1 July 2018 to 30 June 2019.

== Season review ==
=== Pre-season ===
Paul Huntington, the club's longest-serving current player since he arrived from Yeovil Town in July 2012, signed a new three-year contract. He made 46 appearances last season. Other new contracts were signed during the summer by Alan Browne, Tom Clarke, Darnell Fisher, Paul Gallagher and Sean Maguire.

Striker Eoin Doyle transferred to Bradford City on 1 August for an undisclosed fee and signed a two-year contract. On the same day, Preston announced that Billy Bodin had a knee ligament injury and would be out of action for up to six months. Sean Maguire, who had recently renewed his contract, was out for "the first few weeks of the season" with a hamstring injury.

=== August ===
Preston signed two forwards on season-long loans from Manchester City. They are Lukas Nmecha, who is an England U-21 striker, and Brandon Barker, an England U-20 winger. Both made their debuts in the club's second EFL Championship match, away to Swansea City on 11 August.

Daryl Horgan transferred to Hibernian on 10 August for an undisclosed fee and signed a three-year contract. Horgan had appeared a substitute in the opening match against QPR.

== Squad ==
No.	Name	Pos.	Nationality	Place of birth	Age	Apps	Goals	Signed from	Date signed	Fee	End
Goalkeepers
1	Declan Rudd	GK	(England)	Diss	35	123	0	Norwich City	1 July 2017	£966,000	2020
13	Michael Crowe	GK	(Wales) (Norway)	Bexleyheath	30	1	0	Ipswich Town	1 July 2018	Free	2020
25	Connor Ripley	GK	(England)	Middlesbrough	33	2	0	Middlesbrough	9 January 2019	Undisclosed	2022
Defenders
2	Darnell Fisher	RB	(England)	Reading	32	73	0	Rotherham United	27 July 2017	Undisclosed	2020
3	Josh Earl	LB/LW	(England)	Liverpool	27	36	0	Academy	1 July 2017	Trainee	2021
5	Tom Clarke	CB	(England)	Sowerby Bridge	38	236	15	Huddersfield Town	22 May 2013	Free	2020
6	Ben Davies	CB/LB	(England)	Barrow-in-Furness	31	88	2	Academy	25 January 2013	Free	2021
14	Jordan Storey	CB	(England)	Yeovil	28	31	1	Exeter City	1 July 2018	Undisclosed	2022
15	Joe Rafferty	RB	(Republic of Ireland) (England)	Liverpool	32	5	0	Rochdale	23 January 2019	Undisclosed	2022
16	Andrew Hughes	LB	(Wales)	Cardiff	34	34	4	Peterborough United	1 July 2018	Undisclosed	2021
23	Paul Huntington	CB	(England)	Carlisle	38	271	17	Yeovil Town	22 May 2012	Free	2021
31	Tom Stead	DF	(England)		26	0	0	Academy	1 July 2017	Trainee	2019
50	Kevin O'Connor	LB	(Republic of Ireland)	Enniscorthy	22	9	0	Cork City	24 July 2017	Undisclosed	2020
—	Andy Boyle	CB	(Republic of Ireland)	Dublin	35	12	0	Dundalk	1 January 2017	Free	2019
Midfielders
4	Ben Pearson	CM/DM	(England)	Oldham	31	116	1	Manchester United	11 January 2016	£115,000	2021
8	Alan Browne	CM	(Republic of Ireland)	Cork	31	204	28	Free agent	1 January 2014	Free	2021
10	Josh Harrop	AM/CF	(England)	Stockport	30	50	4	Manchester United	3 July 2017	Undisclosed	2021
11	Daniel Johnson	AM	(Jamaica)	Kingston	33	186	31	Aston Villa	23 January 2015	£50,000	2021
12	Paul Gallagher	AM/WG	(Scotland)	Glasgow	42	264	38	Leicester City	16 June 2015	Free	2020
17	Josh Ginnelly	LW	(England)	Coventry	29	5	0	Walsall	1 January 2019	Undisclosed	2021
18	Ryan Ledson	CM	(England)	Liverpool	29	28	0	Oxford United	1 July 2018	Undisclosed	2021
21	Brandon Barker	WG	(England)	Manchester	29	20	2	Manchester City	7 August 2018	Loan	2019
30	Jack Baxter	CM	(England)	Chorley	25	0	0	Academy	1 July 2017	Trainee	2019
32	Adam O'Reilly	CM	(Republic of Ireland)		25	1	0	Ringmahon Rangers	November 2016	Undisclosed	2020
44	Brad Potts	CM	(England)	Hexham	32	10	2	Barnsley	3 January 2019	Undisclosed	2020
Forwards
7	Callum Robinson	WG/CF	(Republic of Ireland) (England)	Northampton	31	149	35	Aston Villa	4 July 2016	Free	2020
9	Louis Moult	CF	(England)	Stoke-on-Trent	34	38	7	Motherwell	1 January 2018	Undisclosed	2021
20	Jayden Stockley	CF	(England)	Poole	32	17	4	Exeter City	3 January 2019	£750,000	2022
24	Sean Maguire	CF	(Republic of Ireland)	Luton	32	52	13	Cork City	24 July 2017	Undisclosed	2021
29	Tom Barkhuizen	RW/SS	(England)	Blackpool	33	101	21	Morecambe	1 January 2017	Free	2020
39	Billy Bodin	RW/CF	(Wales)	Swindon	34	19	1	Bristol Rovers	3 January 2018	Undisclosed	2020
45	Lukas Nmecha	CF	(England) (Germany)	Hamburg	27	44	4	Manchester City	9 August 2018	Loan	2019
Out on Loan
19	Graham Burke	SS	(Republic of Ireland)	Dublin	32	15	2	Shamrock Rovers	1 July 2018	Undisclosed	2021
22	Chris Maxwell	GK	(Wales)	St Asaph	36	81	0	Fleetwood Town	1 July 2016	Free	2020
26	Michael Howard	CF	(England)	Southport	26	0	0	Academy	20 February 2018	Trainee	2019
27	Connor Simpson	CF	(England)	Guisborough	26	1	0	Hartlepool United	11 January 2018	Undisclosed	2020
51	Tommy Spurr	LB	(England)	Leeds	38	24	1	Blackburn Rovers	1 July 2016	Free	2019
52	Ben Pringle	CM/LM	(England)	Newcastle upon Tyne	37	14	0	Fulham	4 July 2016	£255,000	2019
53	Marnick Vermijl	RB	(Belgium)	Peer	34	54	4	Sheffield Wednesday	31 August 2016	Undisclosed	2019

- All appearances and goals up to date as of 5 May 2019.

=== Statistics ===
As of 5 May 2019

No.	Pos	Nat	Player	Total		Championship		FA Cup		League Cup	
No.	Pos	Nat	Player	Apps	Goals	Apps	Goals	Apps	Goals	Apps	Goals
1	GK	(England) ENG	Declan Rudd	36	0	36+0	0	0+0	0	0+0	0
2	DF	(England) ENG	Darnell Fisher	38	0	32+3	0	1+0	0	2+0	0
3	DF	(England) ENG	Josh Earl	16	0	12+2	0	0+0	0	2+0	0
4	DF	(England) ENG	Ben Pearson	32	0	30+0	0	0+0	0	1+1	0
5	DF	(England) ENG	Tom Clarke	22	1	21+0	1	0+0	0	1+0	0
6	DF	(England) ENG	Ben Davies	41	1	39+1	1	0+0	0	1+0	0
7	FW	(Republic of Ireland) IRL	Callum Robinson	28	13	24+3	12	0+0	0	1+0	1
8	MF	(Republic of Ireland) IRL	Alan Browne	40	12	35+2	12	0+1	0	1+1	0
9	FW	(England) ENG	Louis Moult	27	5	8+16	4	0+0	0	2+1	1
10	MF	(England) ENG	Josh Harrop	11	0	4+4	0	0+0	0	1+2	0
11	MF	(Jamaica) JAM	Daniel Johnson	37	7	26+8	6	1+0	0	2+0	1
12	MF	(Scotland) SCO	Paul Gallagher	40	6	28+10	6	1+0	0	1+0	0
13	GK	(Wales) WAL	Michael Crowe	1	0	0+0	0	1+0	0	0+0	0
14	DF	(England) ENG	Jordan Storey	31	1	27+1	1	1+0	0	2+0	0
15	DF	(Republic of Ireland) IRL	Joe Rafferty	5	0	4+1	0	0+0	0	0+0	0
16	DF	(Wales) WAL	Andrew Hughes	34	4	31+1	3	1+0	1	1+0	0
17	MF	(England) ENG	Josh Ginnelly	5	0	0+5	0	0+0	0	0+0	0
18	MF	(England) ENG	Ryan Ledson	28	0	14+10	0	1+0	0	3+0	0
20	FW	(England) ENG	Jayden Stockley	17	4	8+9	4	0+0	0	0+0	0
21	MF	(England) ENG	Brandon Barker	20	2	6+10	0	0+1	0	3+0	2
23	DF	(England) ENG	Paul Huntington	25	0	21+1	0	1+0	0	2+0	0
24	FW	(Republic of Ireland) IRL	Sean Maguire	26	3	19+6	3	0+1	0	0+0	0
25	GK	(England) ENG	Connor Ripley	2	0	2+0	0	0+0	0	0+0	0
29	FW	(England) ENG	Tom Barkhuizen	37	7	26+8	6	1+0	0	2+0	1
32	MF	(Republic of Ireland) IRL	Adam O'Reilly	1	0	0+1	0	0+0	0	0+0	0
33	MF	(England) ENG	Ethan Walker	1	0	0+1	0	0+0	0	0+0	0
44	MF	(England) ENG	Brad Potts	10	2	10+0	2	0+0	0	0+0	0
45	FW	(England) ENG	Lukas Nmecha	44	4	24+17	4	1+0	0	0+2	0
Players currently on loan:
19	FW	(Republic of Ireland) IRL	Graham Burke	15	2	6+6	1	1+0	0	1+1	1
22	GK	(Wales) WAL	Chris Maxwell	11	0	8+0	0	0+0	0	3+0	0
Players who left during the season:
15	DF	(England) ENG	Calum Woods	1	0	0+1	0	0+0	0	0+0	0
17	MF	(Republic of Ireland) IRL	Daryl Horgan	1	0	0+1	0	0+0	0	0+0	0

=== Goals record ===
As of 5 May 2019

Rank	No.	Nat.	Po.	Name	Championship	FA Cup	League Cup	Total
1	7	(Republic of Ireland)	CF	Callum Robinson	12	0	1	13
2	8	(Republic of Ireland)	CM	Alan Browne	12	0	0	12
3	11	(Jamaica)	CM	Daniel Johnson	6	0	1	7
3	29	(England)	WG	Tom Barkhuizen	6	0	1	7
5	12	(Scotland)	AM	Paul Gallagher	6	0	0	6
6	9	(England)	CF	Louis Moult	4	0	1	5
7	16	(Wales)	LB	Andrew Hughes	3	1	0	4
7	20	(England)	CF	Jayden Stockley	4	0	0	4
7	45	(England)	CF	Lukas Nmecha	4	0	0	4
10	24	(Republic of Ireland)	CF	Sean Maguire	3	0	0	3
11	19	(Republic of Ireland)	SS	Graham Burke	1	0	1	2
11	21	(England)	WG	Brandon Barker	0	0	2	2
11	44	(England)	CM	Brad Potts	2	0	0	2
14	5	(England)	CB	Tom Clarke	1	0	0	1
14	6	(England)	CB	Ben Davies	1	0	0	1
14	14	(England)	CB	Jordan Storey	1	0	0	1
Own Goals					1	0	0	1
Total					67	1	7	74

=== Disciplinary record ===
As of 5 May 2019

Rank	No.	Nat.	Po.	Name	Championship			FA Cup			League Cup			Total		
Rank	No.	Nat.	Po.	Name	Booked	(yellow card) (yellow-red card)	Sent off (straight red)	Booked	(yellow card) (yellow-red card)	Sent off (straight red)	Booked	(yellow card) (yellow-red card)	Sent off (straight red)	Booked	(yellow card) (yellow-red card)	Sent off (straight red)
1	4	(England)	DM	Ben Pearson	13	0	3	0	0	0	0	0	0	13	0	3
2	2	(England)	RB	Darnell Fisher	10	1	0	0	0	0	2	0	0	12	1	0
3	11	(Jamaica)	CM	Daniel Johnson	8	0	0	0	0	0	0	0	0	8	0	0
4	6	(England)	CB	Ben Davies	7	0	0	0	0	0	0	0	0	7	0	0
4	18	(England)	CM	Ryan Ledson	4	0	1	1	0	0	0	0	1	5	0	2
6	8	(Republic of Ireland)	CM	Alan Browne	4	0	0	0	0	0	1	0	0	5	0	0
7	3	(England)	LB	Josh Earl	2	1	0	0	0	0	0	0	0	2	1	0
7	12	(Scotland)	AM	Paul Gallagher	3	0	0	1	0	0	0	0	0	4	0	0
9	1	(England)	GK	Declan Rudd	3	0	0	0	0	0	0	0	0	3	0	0
9	22	(Wales)	GK	Chris Maxwell	0	1	0	0	0	0	1	0	0	1	1	0
9	24	(Republic of Ireland)	CF	Sean Maguire	3	0	0	0	0	0	0	0	0	3	0	0
9	45	(England)	CF	Lukas Nmecha	3	0	0	0	0	0	0	0	0	3	0	0
13	9	(England)	CF	Louis Moult	1	0	0	0	0	0	1	0	0	2	0	0
13	16	(Wales)	LB	Andrew Hughes	2	0	0	0	0	0	0	0	0	2	0	0
13	23	(England)	CB	Paul Huntington	2	0	0	0	0	0	0	0	0	2	0	0
16	7	(Republic of Ireland)	CF	Callum Robinson	1	0	0	0	0	0	0	0	0	1	0	0
16	10	(England)	AM	Josh Harrop	0	0	0	0	0	0	1	0	0	1	0	0
16	14	(England)	CB	Jordan Storey	1	0	0	0	0	0	0	0	0	1	0	0
16	20	(England)	CF	Jayden Stockley	1	0	0	0	0	0	0	0	0	1	0	0
Total					68	3	4	2	0	0	6	0	1	76	3	5

=== Contracts ===
Date	Position	Nationality	Name	Contract Length	Status	Expires	Ref.
10 July 2018	CB	(England)	Paul Huntington	3 years	Signed	June 2021	
11 July 2018	CM	(Republic of Ireland)	Alan Browne	3 years	Signed	June 2021	
24 January 2019	CM	(Scotland)	Paul Gallagher	1 year	Signed	June 2020	
25 January 2019	LB	(England)	Josh Earl	2 years	Signed	June 2021	

== Transfers ==
=== Transfers in ===
Date from	Position	Nationality	Name	From	Fee	Ref.
1 July 2018	SS	(Republic of Ireland)	Graham Burke	(Republic of Ireland) Shamrock Rovers	Undisclosed	
1 July 2018	GK	(Republic of Ireland)	Jimmy Corcoran	(Republic of Ireland) Cherry Orchard	Undisclosed	
1 July 2018	GK	(Wales)	Michael Crowe	Ipswich Town	Free transfer	
1 July 2018	LB	(Wales)	Andrew Hughes	Peterborough United	Undisclosed	
1 July 2018	CM	(England)	Ryan Ledson	Oxford United	Undisclosed	
1 July 2018	CM	(Republic of Ireland)	Brian McManus	(Republic of Ireland) St Kevin Boys	Undisclosed	
1 July 2018	CB	(England)	Jordan Storey	Exeter City	£765,000	
1 January 2019	LW	(England)	Josh Ginnelly	Walsall	Undisclosed	
3 January 2019	CM	(England)	Brad Potts	Barnsley	£1,440,000	
3 January 2019	CF	(England)	Jayden Stockley	Exeter City	£747,000	
9 January 2019	GK	(England)	Connor Ripley	Middlesbrough	Undisclosed	
23 January 2019	RB	(Republic of Ireland)	Joe Rafferty	Rochdale	Undisclosed	

=== Transfers out ===
Date from	Position	Nationality	Name	To	Fee	Ref.
13 June 2018	LB	(Republic of Ireland)	Greg Cunningham	(Wales) Cardiff City	Undisclosed	
1 July 2018	CM	(England)	John Welsh	Grimsby Town	End of Contract	
1 August 2018	CF	(Republic of Ireland)	Eoin Doyle	Bradford City	Undisclosed	
11 August 2018	RM	(Republic of Ireland)	Daryl Horgan	(Scotland) Hibernian	Undisclosed	
23 January 2019	RB	(England)	Calum Woods	Bradford City	Free transfer	

=== Loans in ===
Start date	Position	Nationality	Name	From	End date	Ref.
7 August 2018	RW	(England)	Brandon Barker	Manchester City	31 May 2019	
9 August 2018	CF	(England)	Lukas Nmecha	Manchester City	31 May 2019	

=== Loans out ===
Start date	Position	Nationality	Name	To	End date	Ref.
1 July 2018	LB	(England)	Tommy Spurr	Fleetwood Town	3 January 2019	
6 July 2018	GK	(England)	Mathew Hudson	Bury	1 January 2019	
17 August 2018	CF	(England)	Michael Howard	Hednesford Town	1 January 2019	
29 August 2018	LB	(Republic of Ireland)	Kevin O'Connor	Crewe Alexandra	7 January 2019	
31 August 2018	CB	(Republic of Ireland)	Andy Boyle	(Scotland) Dundee	1 January 2019	
31 August 2018	LM	(England)	Ben Pringle	Grimsby Town	21 January 2019	
31 August 2018	RB	(Belgium)	Marnick Vermijl	(Netherlands) MVV Maastricht	31 May 2019	
12 October 2018	CF	(England)	Connor Simpson	Hyde United	1 January 2019	
8 January 2019	GK	(Wales)	Chris Maxwell	Charlton Athletic	31 May 2019	
9 January 2019	CF	(England)	Connor Simpson	Carlisle United	31 May 2019	
11 January 2019	CF	(England)	Michael Howard	Stalybridge Celtic	31 May 2019	
22 January 2019	LM	(England)	Ben Pringle	Tranmere Rovers	31 May 2019	
29 January 2019	CB	(Republic of Ireland)	Andy Boyle	(Scotland) Ross County	30 June 2019	
31 January 2019	SS	(Republic of Ireland)	Graham Burke	Gillingham	4 May 2019	
8 February 2019	LB	(Republic of Ireland)	Kevin O'Connor	(Republic of Ireland) Cork City	31 May 2019	
8 March 2019	CM	(Republic of Ireland)	Adam O'Reilly	Hyde United	April 2019	

== Pre-season friendlies ==
PNE announced they will compete with Bamber Bridge, AFC Fylde, West Ham United and Burnley during pre-season.

7 July 2018 Friendly	Bamber Bridge	0–7	Preston North End	Bamber Bridge
15:00 BST		Report	Burke 4'; Bodin 13'; Maguire 15', 29', 35'; Moult 59'	Stadium: Sir Tom Finney Stadium

14 July 2018 Friendly	AFC Fylde	1–6	Preston North End	Medlar-with-Wesham
15:00 BST	Trialist (pen.)	Report	Huntington; Robinson (x2); Maguire (x2); Hughes	Stadium: Mill Farm; Attendance: 1,812; Referee: David McNamara

17 July 2018 Friendly	Cobh Ramblers	0–5	Preston North End	Cork, Ireland
19:00 BST		Report	Barkhuizen 5', 17', 45'; Clarke 39'; Burke 83'	Stadium: Turners Cross; Referee: Anthony Buttimer

21 July 2018 Friendly	Preston North End	2–2	West Ham United	Preston
15:00 BST	Clarke 40'; Bodin 76'		Arnautović 6', 45'	Stadium: Deepdale

23 July 2018 Friendly	Preston North End	2–3	Burnley	Preston
19:45 BST	Harrop 22'; Robinson 74'	Report	Lennon 26'; Agyei 72'; McNeil 84'	Stadium: Deepdale; Attendance: 4,934; Referee: Peter Bankes

28 July 2018 Friendly	Oldham Athletic	0–3	Preston North End	Oldham
15:00 BST		Report	Moult 50'; Horgan 68'; Gallagher 89' (pen.)	Stadium: Boundary Park; Attendance: 1,660; Referee: Graham Salisbury

== Competitions ==
=== Championship ===
==== League table ====
Pos	Team	Pld	W	D	L	GF	GA	GD	Pts
11	Brentford	46	17	13	16	73	59	+14	64 (Note: Brentford were awarded a 1–0 win over Bolton due to Bolton's inability to hold the fixture.)
12	Sheffield Wednesday	46	16	16	14	60	62	−2	64
13	Hull City	46	17	11	18	66	68	−2	62
14	Preston North End	46	16	13	17	67	67	0	61
15	Blackburn Rovers	46	16	12	18	64	69	−5	60
16	Stoke City	46	11	22	13	45	52	−7	55
17	Birmingham City	46	14	19	13	64	58	+6	52 (Note: Birmingham City were deducted 9 points for failure to comply with the EFL profitability and sustainability rules.)

Source: Sky Sports Archived 25 September 2019 at the Wayback Machine
Rules for classification: 1) Points; 2) Goal difference; 3) Number of goals scored; 4) Head-to-head results

==== Result summary ====
Overall								Home						Away					
Pld	W	D	L	GF	GA	GD	Pts	W	D	L	GF	GA	GD	W	D	L	GF	GA	GD
46	16	13	17	67	67	0	61	8	10	5	42	30	+12	8	3	12	25	37	−12

Last updated: 4 May 2019.
Source: BBC Sport

==== Results by matchday ====
Matchday	1	2	3	4	5	6	7	8	9	10	11	12	13	14	15	16	17	18	19	20	21	22	23	24	25	26	27	28	29	30	31	32	33	34	35	36	37	38	39	40	41	42	43	44	45	46
Ground	H	A	H	A	A	H	H	A	A	H	A	H	A	H	H	A	A	H	H	A	A	H	A	H	H	A	H	A	A	H	A	H	H	A	H	A	A	H	A	H	H	A	H	A	H	A
Result	W	L	D	L	L	D	L	L	L	L	D	W	D	W	D	D	W	W	D	L	W	W	L	L	D	L	D	W	W	D	W	W	D	W	D	W	W	W	L	L	L	L	W	L	D	L
Position	6	10	13	18	19	18	23	23	24	24	24	22	21	19	20	21	18	16	15	17	15	15	15	17	17	17	18	18	16	16	14	14	11	10	12	11	9	7	10	10	11	12	9	12	12	14

Updated to match(es) played on 4 May 2019. Source: BBC Sport
A = Away; H = Home; W = Win; D = Draw; L = Loss

==== Matches ====
On 21 June 2018, the Championship fixtures for the forthcoming season were announced.

4 August 2018 1	Preston North End	1–0	Queens Park Rangers	Preston
15:00 BST	Alan Browne 50'	Report	Ryan Manning (yellow card) 66'; Josh Scowen (yellow card) 73'	Stadium: Deepdale; Attendance: 13,418; Referee: Darren England

11 August 2018 2	Swansea City	1–0	Preston North End	Swansea
15:00 BST	Fulton 32'	Report	Fisher (yellow card) 32'	Stadium: Liberty Stadium; Referee: James Linington

18 August 2018 3	Preston North End	2–2	Stoke City	Preston
17:30 BST	Gallagher 40'; Burke 45+4'; Pearson (yellow card) 64'; Gallagher (yellow card) 83'	Report	Allen (yellow card) 27'; Pieters 42'; Crouch 61'; Shawcross (yellow card) 86'; Crouch (yellow card) 90+1'	Stadium: Deepdale; Attendance: 13,996; Referee: Andy Madley

22 August 2018 4	Norwich City	2–0	Preston North End	Norwich
19:45 BST	Leitner (yellow card) 65'; Pukki 80'; Tettey 87', (yellow card) 87'	Report	Pearson (yellow card) 61'; Browne (yellow card) 84'	Stadium: Carrow Road; Attendance: 24,936; Referee: Gavin Ward

25 August 2018 5	Derby County	2–0	Preston North End	Derby
15:00 BST	Mount 38'; Keogh 78'	Report		Stadium: Pride Park Stadium; Attendance: 25,257; Referee: David Webb

1 September 2018 6	Preston North End	2–2	Bolton Wanderers	Preston
15:00 BST	Robinson 11'; Browne 16'; Johnson (yellow card) 83'; Pearson (red card) 90+8'	Report	Ameobi 38'; Olkowski 40'; Magennis (yellow card) 70'; O'Neil (yellow card) 86'; Williams (yellow card) 90+8'	Stadium: Deepdale; Attendance: 16,331; Referee: Andy Davies

15 September 2018 7	Preston North End	2–3	Reading	Preston
15:00 BST	Johnson 31'; Robinson 76'; Earl (yellow card) 90+4'	Report	Baldock 23'; Yiadom (yellow card) 43'; Ilori 52'; Bacuna 81'	Stadium: Deepdale; Attendance: 10,849; Referee: Darren Bond

18 September 2018 8	Leeds United	3–0	Preston North End	Leeds
19:45 BST	Cooper 37'; Roberts 74', 82'	Report		Stadium: Elland Road; Attendance: 27,729; Referee: Geoff Eltringham

22 September 2018 9	Sheffield United	3–2	Preston North End	Sheffield
15:00 BST	Sharp 36'; Basham 51'; McGoldrick 87'	Report	Robinson 80'; Johnson 82'	Stadium: Bramall Lane; Attendance: 23,857; Referee: Scott Duncan

29 September 2018 10	Preston North End	2–3	West Bromwich Albion	Preston
15:00 BST	Hughes 71'; Browne 90+6'	Report	Rodriguez 48'; Davies 73' (o.g.); Gayle 88'	Stadium: Deepdale; Attendance: 14,099; Referee: Tony Harrington

2 October 2018 11	Aston Villa	3–3	Preston North End	Birmingham
19:45 BST	Kodjia 26'; Abraham 37'; Chester (red card) 54'; Bolasie 90+1'	Report	Johnson 56' (pen.); Gallagher 79'; Moult 86'	Stadium: Villa Park; Attendance: 27,331; Referee: Peter Bankes

6 October 2018 12	Preston North End	4–0	Wigan Athletic	Preston
15:00 BST	Barkhuizen 17'; Robinson 51'; Gallagher 85' (pen.); Burn 90+6' (o.g.)	Report	Gibson (red card) 56'	Stadium: Deepdale; Attendance: 15,280; Referee: Lee Probert

20 October 2018 13	Hull City	1–1	Preston North End	Kingston upon Hull
15:00 BST	Irvine (yellow card) 13'; Bowen 85' (pen.)	Report	Fisher (yellow card) 66'; Hughes (yellow card) 78'; Davies (yellow card) 81'; Storey (yellow card) 84'; Louis Moult 90+3'	Stadium: KCOM Stadium; Attendance: 12,066; Referee: Gavin Ward

24 October 2018 14	Preston North End	4–3	Brentford	Preston
19:45 BST	Browne 5'; Robinson 12', 69'; Barkhuizen 23'	Report	Canós 29'; Watkins 56'; Maupay 85'	Stadium: Deepdale; Attendance: 10,882; Referee: Scott Duncan

27 October 2018 15	Preston North End	1–1	Rotherham United	Preston
15:00 BST	Barkhuizen 40'; Maguire (yellow card) 90'	Report	Smith 55'; Towell (yellow card) 84'	Stadium: Deepdale; Attendance: 11,780; Referee: Jeremy Simpson

3 November 2018 16	Ipswich Town	1–1	Preston North End	Ipswich
15:00 GMT	Chambers (yellow card) 36'; Sears 45' (pen.); Edwards (yellow card) 51'; Jordan Roberts (yellow card) 62'; Pennington (yellow card) 90+6'	Report	Maxwell (yellow card) 44' (yellow-red card) 75'; Johnson (yellow card) 45'; Pearson (yellow card) 57'; Gallagher 73'	Stadium: Portman Road; Attendance: 15,129; Referee: Andy Woolmer

10 November 2018 17	Bristol City	0–1	Preston North End	Bristol
15:00 GMT	Hunt (yellow card) 88'	Report	Robinson 35'; Johnson (yellow card) 75'; Earl (yellow card) 79'	Stadium: Ashton Gate Stadium; Attendance: 19,797; Referee: Geoff Eltringham

24 November 2018 18	Preston North End	4–1	Blackburn Rovers	Preston
15:00 GMT	Barkhuizen 2'; Robinson 10'; Moult 74'; Browne 85'	Report	Graham 48'	Stadium: Deepdale; Attendance: 19,912; Referee: Andrew Madley

27 November 2018 19	Preston North End	1–1	Middlesbrough	Preston
19:45 GMT	Browne 43'	Report	Tavernier 46'	Stadium: Deepdale; Attendance: 10,990; Referee: Peter Bankes

1 December 2018 20	Birmingham City	3–0	Preston North End	Birmingham
15:00 GMT	Kieftenbeld 46'; Maghoma 61'; Adams 77'	Report		Stadium: St Andrew's; Attendance: 20,523; Referee: David Webb

8 December 2018 21	Nottingham Forest	0–1	Preston North End	Nottingham
15:00 GMT	Yacob (yellow card) 86'	Report	Moult 56'; Davies (yellow card) 74'	Stadium: City Ground; Attendance: 27,777; Referee: Steve Martin

15 December 2018 22	Preston North End	3–2	Millwall	Preston
	Davies (yellow card) 15'; Browne 37'; Barkhuizen 42'; Hughes 81'	Report	Romeo (yellow card) 5'; Cooper 61', (yellow card) 80'; Wallace (yellow card) 69'; Gregory 90+3'	Stadium: Deepdale; Attendance: 10,924; Referee: John Brooks

22 December 2018 23	Sheffield Wednesday	1–0	Preston North End	Sheffield
	Hector 62'; Nuhiu (yellow card) 90+3'	Report	Moult (yellow card) 16'; Pearson (red card) 26'; Rudd (yellow card) 57'; Ledson (yellow card) 78'	Stadium: Hillsborough Stadium; Attendance: 22,366; Referee: David Coote

26 December 2018 24	Preston North End	1–2	Hull City	Preston
	Browne 47'	Report	Irvine 28', 80'; Henriksen (yellow card) 67'	Stadium: Deepdale; Attendance: 14,026; Referee: Scott Duncan

29 December 2018 25	Preston North End	1–1	Aston Villa	Preston
	Johnson (yellow card) 52'; Gallagher (yellow card) 59'; Elmohamady 61' (o.g.)	Report	Abraham 45', (yellow card) 59'; Hutton (yellow card) 70'	Stadium: Deepdale; Attendance: 19,126; Referee: Geoff Eltringham

1 January 2019 26	Rotherham United	2–1	Preston North End	Rotherham
15:00 GMT	Palmer (yellow card) 12'; Raggett (yellow card) 29'; Vaulks 45+1' (yellow card) 74'; Smith 76' (yellow card) 83'; Wiles (yellow card) 82'	Report	Ledson (yellow card) 31'; Nmecha 78'	Stadium: New York Stadium; Attendance: 9,077; Referee: Lee Probert

12 January 2019 27	Preston North End	1–1	Swansea City	Preston
15:00 GMT	Johnson 60' (pen.); Earl (yellow card) 72' (yellow-red card) 81'	Report	Fer (yellow card) 45+3'; Baker-Richardson 55', (yellow card) 62' van der Hoorn (yellow card) 59'	Stadium: Deepdale; Attendance: 11,604; Referee: Keith Stroud

19 January 2019 28	Queens Park Rangers	1–4	Preston North End	Shepherd's Bush
15:00 GMT	Scowen (yellow card) 9'; Smith 84'; Furlong (yellow card) 90+2'; Lynch (yellow card) 90+3'	Report	Stockley 14'; Sean Maguire (yellow card) 23'; Storey 68'; Browne 82'; Potts 87'	Stadium: Loftus Road; Attendance: 13,736; Referee: Andy Madley

26 January 2019 29	Stoke City	0–2	Preston North End	Stoke-on-Trent
15:00 GMT	Clucas (yellow card) 31'; McLean (yellow card) 85'	Report	Browne 20'; Potts 80'; Pearson (yellow card) 86'	Stadium: Bet365 Stadium; Attendance: 25,053; Referee: Oliver Langford

1 February 2019 30	Preston North End	0–0	Derby County	Preston
19:45 GMT	Pearson (yellow card) 28'	Report	Malone (yellow card) 90+1'	Stadium: Deepdale; Attendance: 12,124; Referee: Darren Bond

9 February 2019 31	Bolton Wanderers	1–2	Preston North End	Bolton
15:00 GMT	Magennis (yellow card) 60'; Vela (yellow card) 85'; Donaldson 90'	Report	Browne 40'; Barkhuizen 82'	Stadium: University of Bolton Stadium; Attendance: 17,381; Referee: Andy Madley

13 February 2019 32	Preston North End	3–1	Norwich City	Preston
19:45 GMT	Davies 2'; Gallagher 24' (pen.); Pearson (yellow card) 32'; Maguire 69'; Nmecha (yellow card) 71'; Rudd (yellow card) 90+4'	Report	Stiepermann (penalty missed) 33'; Zimmermann (yellow card) 36'; Pukki 90+3'; Aarons (yellow card) 90+4'	Stadium: Deepdale; Attendance: 11,280; Referee: Geoff Eltringham

16 February 2019 33	Preston North End	0–0	Nottingham Forest	Preston
15:00 GMT	Stockley (yellow card) 83'	Report		Stadium: Deepdale; Attendance: 13,904; Referee: Tim Robinson

23 February 2019 34	Millwall	1–3	Preston North End	Bermondsey
15:00 GMT	Thompson 67'; Williams (yellow card) 73'; Wallace (yellow card) 89'	Report	Hughes 4'; Clarke 16'; Maguire 27'; Pearson (yellow card) 85'	Stadium: The Den; Attendance: 13,265; Referee: Stephen Martin

2 March 2019 35	Preston North End	1–1	Bristol City	Preston
15:00 GMT	Johnson 42'	Report	Kelly (yellow card) 41'; O'Dowda (yellow card) 50'; Diédhiou 69'; Pack (yellow card) 84'	Stadium: Deepdale; Attendance: 12,863; Referee: Jeremy Simpson

9 March 2019 36	Blackburn Rovers	0–1	Preston North End	Blackburn
12:00 GMT	Evans (yellow card) 58'; Reed (yellow card) 60'	Report	Johnson 8'; Fisher (yellow card) 81' (yellow-red card) 90+2'	Stadium: Ewood Park; Attendance: 21,577; Referee: Oliver Langford

13 March 2019 37	Middlesbrough	1–2	Preston North End	Middlesbrough
19:45 GMT	Fletcher 32'; Ayala (red card) 61'	Report	Pearson (yellow card) 55'; Gallagher 63'; Stockley 81'; Hughes (yellow card) 90'	Stadium: Riverside Stadium; Attendance: 21,088; Referee: Keith Stroud

16 March 2019 38	Preston North End	1–0	Birmingham City	Preston
15:00 GMT	Pearson (yellow card) 10'; Fisher (yellow card) 45'; Davies (yellow card) 86'; Maguire 90+4'	Report	Kieftenbeld (yellow card) 64'; Maghoma (yellow card) 84'; Gardner (yellow card) 90+6'	Stadium: Deepdale; Attendance: 17,509; Referee: Scott Duncan

30 March 2019 39	Reading	2–1	Preston North End	Reading
15:00 GMT	Méïté 30'; Barrow 36'	Report	Fisher (yellow card) 72'; Stockley 90+3'	Stadium: Madejski Stadium; Attendance: 16,771; Referee: Tony Harrington

6 April 2019 40	Preston North End	0–1	Sheffield United	Preston
15:00 BST	Pearson (yellow card) 36'; Gallagher (yellow card) 89'; Browne (yellow card) 90+2'	Report	Dowell (yellow card) 20'; McGoldrick 33'	Stadium: Deepdale; Attendance: 18,339; Referee: Gavin Ward

9 April 2019 41	Preston North End	0–2	Leeds United	Preston
19:45 BST	Pearson (yellow card) 14' (red card) 49'; Davies (yellow card) 45+2'	Report	Bamford 62', 76'; Alioski (yellow card) 67'; Phillips (yellow card) 81'	Stadium: Deepdale; Attendance: 18,019; Referee: Robert Jones

13 April 2019 42	West Bromwich Albion	4–1	Preston North End	West Bromwich
15:00 BST	Gayle 27', 31', 71'; Rodriguez 43'; Livermore (yellow card) 57'; Dawson (yellow card) 90'	Report	Fisher (yellow card) 74'	Stadium: The Hawthorns; Attendance: 25,088; Referee: Roger East

19 April 2019 43	Preston North End	4–0	Ipswich Town	Preston
15:00 BST	Robinson 6', 22'; Nmecha 56', 75'	Report	Kenlock (yellow card) 78'	Stadium: Deepdale; Attendance: 12,546; Referee: Stephen Martin

22 April 2019 44	Wigan Athletic	2–0	Preston North End	Wigan
15:00 BST	Clarke 11'; Morsy (yellow card) 44'; Evans 68'	Report	Nmecha (yellow card) 13'; Ledson (red card) 34'; Maguire (yellow card) 76'	Stadium: DW Stadium; Attendance: 12,496; Referee: Andrew Madley

27 April 2019 45	Preston North End	3–3	Sheffield Wednesday	Preston
15:00 BST	Stockley 9'; Lees 36' (o.g.); Browne 62'; Fisher (yellow card) 64'	Report	Pelupessy (yellow card) 35'; Bannan 49' (yellow card) 54'; Forestieri 76'; Nuhiu 78'; Iorfa (red card) 80'	Stadium: Deepdale; Attendance: 15,873; Referee: Jeremy Simpson

5 May 2019 46	Brentford	3–0	Preston North End	Brentford
12:30 BST	Konsa 45+4'; Maupay 54'; Forss 83'	Report	Johnson (yellow card) 28'; Fisher (yellow card) 65'	Stadium: Griffin Park; Attendance: 11,289; Referee: James Linington

=== FA Cup ===
The third round draw was made live on BBC by Ruud Gullit and Paul Ince from Stamford Bridge on 3 December 2018.

6 January 2019 Third round	Preston North End	1–3	Doncaster Rovers	Preston
14:00 GMT	Ledson (yellow card) 38'; Hughes 56'; Gallagher (yellow card) 71'	Report	Butler (yellow card) 2'; Marquis 5'; Wilks (yellow card) 33' (goal) 87'; Anderson 72'; Andrew (yellow card) 77'	Stadium: Deepdale; Attendance: 8,101; Referee: Andy Davies

=== EFL Cup ===
On 15 June 2018, the draw for the first round was made in Vietnam. The second round draw was done on 16 August. The third round draw was made on 30 August 2018 by David Seaman and Joleon Lescott.

14 August 2018 First round	Preston North End	3–1	Morecambe	Preston
19:45 BST	Barker 14'; Moult 33'; Fisher (yellow card) 39'; Burke 58'	Report	Mandeville 45'	Stadium: Deepdale; Attendance: 6,077; Referee: Tom Nield

28 August 2018 Second round	Leeds United	0–2	Preston North End	Leeds
19:45 BST		Report	Johnson 2' (pen.); Ledson (red card) 29'; Barker 45+1'	Stadium: Elland Road; Attendance: 18,652; Referee: Tony Harrington

25 September 2018 Third round	Preston North End	2–2 (3–4 p)	Middlesbrough	Preston
19:45 BST	Robinson 27'; Barkhuizen 66'	Report	Fletcher 34'; Tavernier 69'	Stadium: Deepdale; Attendance: 5,095; Referee: Oliver Langford
	Penalties
	Ledson (penalty scored); Robinson (penalty missed); Moult (penalty scored); Pearson (penalty scored); Burke (penalty missed)		Leadbitter (penalty scored); Gestede (penalty scored); McNair (penalty scored); Tavernier (penalty scored)
