= Darnell Fisher =

English footballer (born 1994)

Personal information
- Full name: Darnell Theophilous Fisher
- Date of birth: 4 April 1994 (age 32)
- Place of birth: Reading, England
- Height: 1.75 m (5 ft 9 in)
- Position: Right-back

Youth career
- 2010–2011: Farnborough
- 2011–2013: Celtic

Senior career*
Years	Team	Apps	(Gls)
2013–2016	Celtic	17	(0)
2015–2016	→ St Johnstone (loan)	23	(1)
2016–2017	Rotherham United	34	(0)
2017–2021	Preston North End	111	(1)
2021–2023	Middlesbrough	13	(0)
Total		198	(2)
- * Club domestic league appearances and goals

Darnell Theophilous Fisher (born 4 April 1994) is an English former professional footballer who played as a right-back. He played in the Scottish Premiership for Celtic and St Johnstone, as well as in the Championship with Rotherham United, Preston North End and Middlesbrough.

== Career ==
=== Celtic ===
Born in Reading, Berkshire, Fisher began his career at hometown club Eldon Celtic, before moving on to Farnborough. He then signed his first professional contract in the summer of 2011 when he joined Celtic. Fisher made his first team debut for Celtic on 19 October 2013 against Hibernian at Easter Road. Fisher got this opportunity to play at right-back for the first team due to Adam Matthews and Mikael Lustig both being injured. The young defender got an extended run in the team and made a further 12 appearances. An injury sustained in March 2014 ruled Fisher for the rest of the season, but Celtic went on to win the league title and he made enough appearances to collect a league winner's medal.

Fisher returned to playing football for the Development Side in September 2014. He made his first appearance of the season for the first team on 11 December 2014 when he came on as a substitute for the under-performing Matthews in Celtic's 4–3 defeat away against Dinamo Zagreb in the Europa League. Fisher made a further four substitute appearances in League and League Cup games from January to March 2015. He was an unused substitute in Celtic's 2–0 win over Dundee United on 15 March 2015 in the 2015 Scottish League Cup Final, entitling him to a winner's medal. On 25 August 2015, Fisher was loaned to St Johnstone for the rest of the 2015–16 season. He scored his first professional goal in a 3–0 win over Hearts on 19 March 2016.

=== Rotherham United ===
Fisher signed a three-year contract with Rotherham United in August 2016.

=== Preston North End ===
Following Rotherham's relegation at the end of his first season, Fisher signed a three-year contract with Preston North End for an undisclosed fee, later revealed as being "nothing" by the Preston manager Alex Neil.

Fisher was investigated and subsequently charged with violent conduct by the Football Association (FA) in November 2020 after footage showed him twice grab Sheffield Wednesday's Callum Paterson by the genitals during a game between their respective clubs on 21 November. On 27 November, Fisher was found guilty and banned for three games.

=== Middlesbrough ===
On 29 January 2021, Fisher joined Championship side Middlesbrough for an undisclosed fee (thought to be around £300,000), signing a two-and-a-half-year contract. After a long term injury that kept Fisher out of the whole of the 2021-22 season, he was a late substitution on 8 May 2023 in a 1-1 draw against Coventry City. He was released by the club at the end of the 2022–23 season.

On 23 October 2023, he announced his retirement from football after dealing with his serious knee injury.

== Post-retirement ==
Following his retirement from professional football, Fisher began playing for amateur side South Reading FC and won the Slough Town Junior Cup in 2024.

== Career statistics ==
As of match played 17 April 2021

Appearances and goals by club, season and competition
Club	Season	League			Domestic Cup		League Cup		Other		Total	
Club	Season	Division	Apps	Goals	Apps	Goals	Apps	Goals	Apps	Goals	Apps	Goals
Celtic	2013–14	Scottish Premiership	12	0	1	0	0	0	0	0	13	0
Celtic	2014–15	Scottish Premiership	5	0	2	0	0	0	1 (Note: Appearance in the Europa League)	0	8	0
Celtic	Total		17	0	3	0	0	0	1	0	21	0
St Johnstone (loan)	2015–16	Scottish Premiership	23	1	0	0	0	0	0	0	23	1
Rotherham United	2016–17	Championship	34	0	1	0	0	0	0	0	35	0
Preston North End	2017–18	Championship	34	0	1	0	0	0	0	0	35	0
Preston North End	2018–19	Championship	35	0	1	0	2	0	0	0	38	0
Preston North End	2019–20	Championship	28	0	1	0	1	0	0	0	30	0
Preston North End	2020–21	Championship	14	1	1	0	1	0	0	0	16	1
Preston North End	Total		168	1	4	0	4	0	0	0	177	2
Middlesbrough	2020–21	Championship	12	0	0	0	0	0	0	0	12	0
Middlesbrough	2021–22	Championship	0	0	0	0	0	0	0	0	0	0
Middlesbrough	2022–23	Championship	1	0	0	0	0	0	0	0	1	0
Middlesbrough	Total		13	0	0	0	0	0	0	0	13	0
Career Total			198	2	8	0	4	0	1	0	211	2

== Honours ==
Celtic

- Scottish Premiership: 2013–14
- Scottish League Cup: 2015
