= Declan Rudd =

English footballer

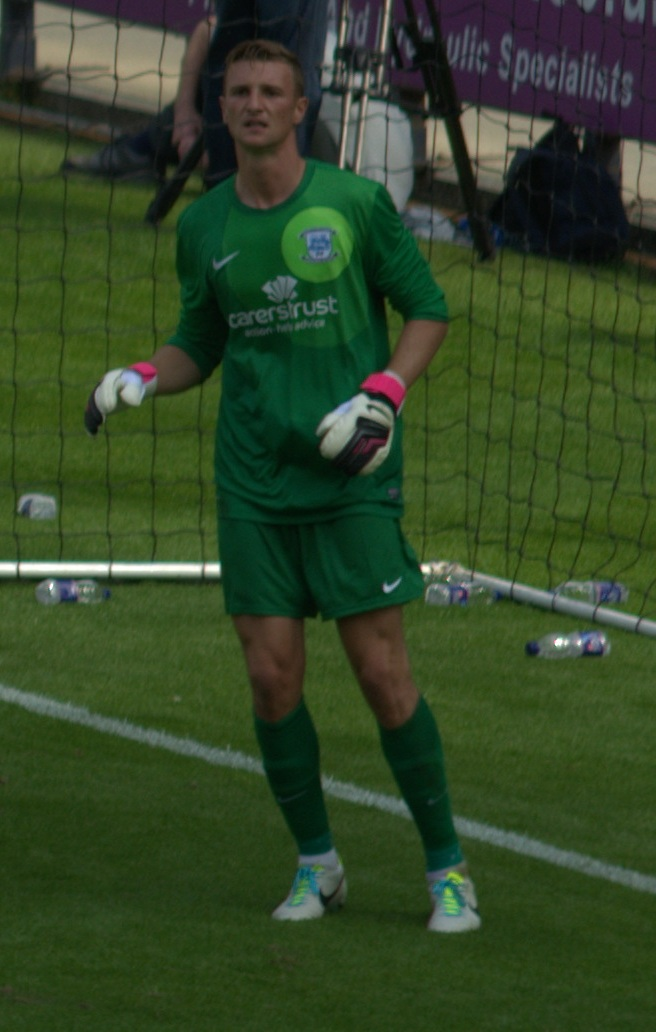
- Rudd playing for Preston North End in 2013

Personal information
- Full name: Declan Thomas Rudd
- Date of birth: 16 January 1991 (age 35)
- Place of birth: Diss, England
- Height: 6 ft 3 in (1.91 m)
- Position: Goalkeeper

Youth career
- 1999–2008: Norwich City

Senior career*
Years	Team	Apps	(Gls)
2008–2017	Norwich City	21	(0)
2013	→ Preston North End (loan)	14	(0)
2013–2014	→ Preston North End (loan)	46	(0)
2016–2017	→ Charlton Athletic (loan)	38	(0)
2017–2022	Preston North End	121	(0)
Total		240	(0)

International career
2006–2007	England U16	3	(0)
2007–2008	England U17	4	(0)
2009–2010	England U19	10	(0)
2009	England U20	1	(0)
2013	England U21	1	(0)
- * Club domestic league appearances and goals

Declan Thomas Rudd (born 16 January 1991) is an English former professional footballer who played as a goalkeeper.

== Early life ==
Born in Diss, Norfolk, he was originally spotted by Norwich City when playing for local side Bressingham as a striker.

"I think my size helped me," said Rudd speaking to Club's official matchday programme, 'On The Ball', back in October 2007. "I was quite tall for my age and I've always enjoyed playing in goal in the past. But the coaches at my old club always felt I was better outfield. It was only at Norwich when they said I wouldn't make it as a striker that I became a goalkeeper."

== Club career ==
=== Norwich City ===
As a youth player, Rudd was heavily involved with Norwich's run in the FA Youth Cup in 2008–09. In the fifth round, he saved three penalties against Everton, having also scored a penalty in an earlier round. Norwich manager Bryan Gunn said:

It's all in Declan's hands, literally, but then again it's in his feet as well. He showed the confidence he's got as a young goalkeeper. He stood up and took the winning penalty kick against Stoke – last night he just saved the three. I'm sure he'll be in there with a big smile on his face today and rightly so. He's got an opportunity to be a top quality goalkeeper. He's just got to be focused on his job ahead and not get rushed into things. We have to try and develop him in the right way. When he comes into the first team training he doesn't look out of place. He's got a great opportunity of being a top class goalkeeper.

Rudd was named as a substitute for the final game of the 2007–08 season at Hillsborough against Sheffield Wednesday.

In summer 2008, Rudd signed a professional contract with the Canaries. In season 2008–09, he was allocated a squad number of 13.

He made his professional debut on 26 September 2009, in an away match at Gillingham, coming on as a substitute following the sending off of Fraser Forster. His full debut came three days later at Carrow Road in a 4–0 win against Leyton Orient.

Rudd made his first appearance in the Championship in a 2–1 victory over Barnsley on 11 September 2010, due to an injury to John Ruddy.

Rudd made his first appearance in the Premier League on 27 August 2011, after John Ruddy was sent off in a 3–1 defeat to Chelsea. His first taste of Premier League football was to concede a penalty from Frank Lampard. Due to Ruddy's subsequent suspension, Rudd made his full Premier League debut on 11 September at home to West Bromwich Albion, saving a penalty from Peter Odemwingie in a 1–0 defeat.

Following Norwich's 4–1 FA Cup victory over Burnley in January 2012, Rudd was ruled out for a few months with a thigh injury sustained in training.

On 12 August 2014, following two loan spells at Preston North End, Rudd signed a new three-year contract at Norwich, with the option for a further twelve months.

=== Preston North End ===
It was announced on 20 June 2017 that Rudd had signed a permanent deal with Preston North End for an undisclosed fee.

On 31 March 2022, Rudd announced his retirement from football due to a knee injury.

== International career ==
Rudd played for England at various youth levels. He gained his first Under-21 call up in August 2011.

== Career statistics ==
Appearances and goals by club, season and competition
Club	Season	League			FA Cup		League Cup		Other		Total	
Club	Season	Division	Apps	Goals	Apps	Goals	Apps	Goals	Apps	Goals	Apps	Goals
Norwich City	2009–10	League One	7	0	1	0	0	0	0	0	8	0
Norwich City	2010–11	Championship	1	0	1	0	1	0	—		3	0
Norwich City	2011–12	Premier League	2	0	1	0	1	0	—		4	0
Norwich City	2012–13	Premier League	0	0	2	0	1	0	—		3	0
Norwich City	2014–15	Championship	0	0	0	0	2	0	0	0	2	0
Norwich City	2015–16	Premier League	11	0	0	0	3	0	—		14	0
Norwich City	Total		21	0	5	0	8	0	0	0	34	0
Preston North End (loan)	2012–13	League One	14	0	—		—		—		14	0
Preston North End (loan)	2013–14	League One	46	0	6	0	1	0	2 (Note: Appearances in the League One play-offs)	0	55	0
Preston North End (loan)	Total		60	0	6	0	1	0	2	0	69	0
Charlton Athletic (loan)	2016–17	League One	38	0	1	0	1	0	0	0	40	0
Preston North End	2017–18	Championship	16	0	2	0	0	0	—		18	0
Preston North End	2018–19	Championship	36	0	0	0	0	0	—		36	0
Preston North End	2019–20	Championship	46	0	0	0	0	0	—		46	0
Preston North End	2020–21	Championship	22	0	0	0	1	0	—		23	0
Preston North End	2021–22	Championship	1	0	0	0	3	0	—		4	0
Preston North End	Total		121	0	2	0	4	0	0	0	127	0
Career Total			240	0	14	0	14	0	2	0	270	0

== Honours ==
Norwich City

- Football League Championship play-offs: 2015

England U19

- UEFA European Under-19 Championship runner-up: 2009
