= Andrew Hughes (footballer, born 1992) =

Welsh footballer

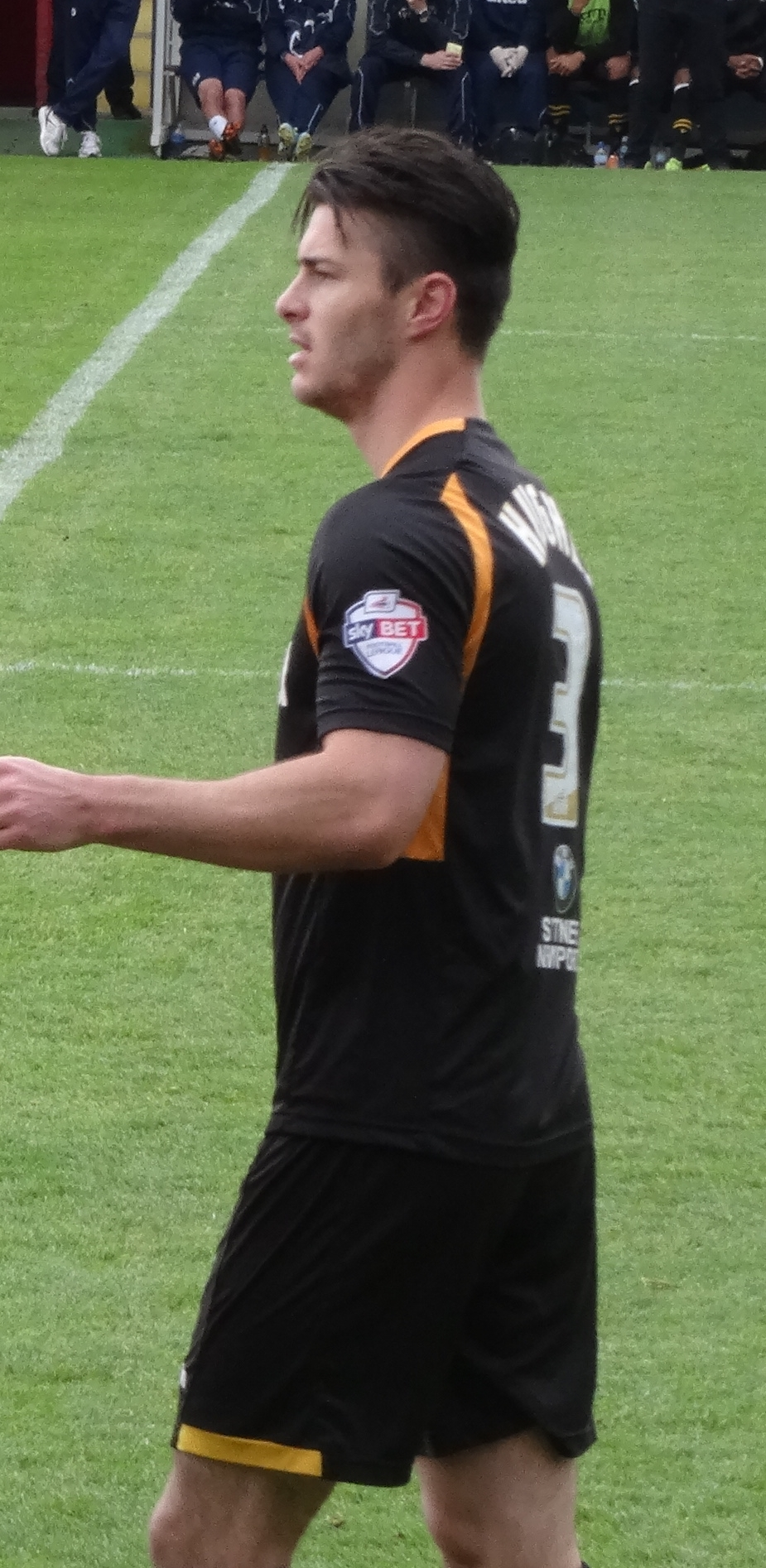
- Hughes playing for Newport County in 2014

Personal information
- Full name: Andrew Martyn Hughes
- Date of birth: 5 June 1992 (age 34)
- Place of birth: Cardiff, Wales
- Height: 1.83 m (6 ft 0 in)
- Position: Full back

Team information
- Current team: Preston North End
- Number: 16

Youth career
- –2008: Newport County

Senior career*
Years	Team	Apps	(Gls)
2008–2016	Newport County	141	(4)
2016–2018	Peterborough United	82	(3)
2018–	Preston North End	290	(9)

International career
2012	Wales Semi-Pro, U18s & U23s	5	(0)
- * Club domestic league appearances and goals as of 20:08, 24 October 2026 (UTC)

Andrew Martyn Hughes (born 5 June 1992) is a Welsh professional footballer who plays as a defender for EFL Championship club Preston North End.

== Career ==
=== Newport County ===
Hughes was a part of the Cardiff City youth system, joining them at the age of 7 before being released at aged 15. Hughes then joined the Newport County Academy and made his Newport County senior debut at the age of 16 on 10 December 2008 in the Conference South league.

In the 2011–12 season Hughes played 44 games, more than any other County player that season. He also won County's Young player of the Year award.

On 12 May 2012 Hughes played for Newport County in the FA Trophy Final at Wembley Stadium which Newport lost 2–0 to York City.

In the 2012–13 season he was part of the Newport team that finished 3rd in the league, reaching the Conference National playoffs. Newport County won the playoff final versus Wrexham at Wembley Stadium 2–0 to return to the Football League after a 25-year absence with promotion to Football League Two.

Hughes made his League Cup debut in Newport's 1st round 3–1 win at Brighton on 6 August 2013 as a second-half substitute for the injured Byron Anthony. He made his Football League debut for Newport in League Two versus Northampton Town on 10 August 2013. He scored his first Football League goal in a 1–1 draw with Scunthorpe United on 31 August 2013. Hughes signed a new deal with the club on 23 October 2013 to the end of the 2014–15 season which was further extended in the summer of 2015 to the end of the 2015–16 season.

=== Peterborough United ===
Hughes was offered a new contract by Newport County at the end of the 2015–16 season but chose to move on to EFL League One club Peterborough United on a two-year deal. He made his debut for the club on 6 August 2016, in a 3–2 win against Rochdale. He scored his first goal for the club on 27 August 2016, in a 2–0 win against Milton Keynes Dons.

=== Preston North End ===
On 21 June 2018, Hughes joined EFL Championship club Preston North End on a three-year deal for an undisclosed fee. He made his debut for the club on 4 August 2018, in a 1–0 win against Queens Park Rangers. He scored his first goal for the club in a 3–2 loss against West Bromwich Albion on 29 September 2018. On 5 January 2022, Hughes signed a new contract with Preston until 2024. On 19 January 2024, Hughes had the one-year contract extension option exercised and signed until the summer of 2025. On 13 January 2025, Hughes signed an extension to his contract, taking him to the end of the 2025-26 season.

Hughes made his 300th appearance for Preston on 6 April 2026 against Queens Park Rangers.

== Career statistics ==
As of match played 24 October 2026

Appearances and goals by club, season and competition
Club	Season	League			FA Cup		League Cup		Other		Total	
Club	Season	Division	Apps	Goals	Apps	Goals	Apps	Goals	Apps	Goals	Apps	Goals
Newport County	2010–11	Conference Premier	10	1	0	0	—		1 (Note: Appearances in the FA Trophy)	0	11	1
Newport County	2011–12	Conference Premier	38	0	2	0	—		7	0	47	0
Newport County	2012–13	Conference Premier	26	0	1	0	—		0	0	27	0
Newport County	2013–14	League Two	26	2	1	0	2	0	2 (Note: Appearances in the Football League Trophy)	0	31	2
Newport County	2014–15	League Two	16	1	1	0	0	0	0	0	17	1
Newport County	2015–16	League Two	25	0	3	0	0	0	0	0	28	0
Newport County	Total		141	4	8	0	2	0	10	0	161	4
Peterborough United	2016–17	League One	39	1	4	0	2	0	1 (Note: Appearances in the EFL Trophy)	0	46	1
Peterborough United	2017–18	League One	43	2	6	1	1	0	6	0	56	2
Peterborough United	Total		82	3	10	1	3	0	7	0	102	4
Preston North End	2018–19	Championship	32	3	1	1	1	0	—		34	4
Preston North End	2019–20	Championship	28	0	0	0	0	0	—		28	0
Preston North End	2020–21	Championship	35	0	1	0	1	0	—		37	0
Preston North End	2021–22	Championship	40	1	0	0	4	1	—		44	2
Preston North End	2022–23	Championship	30	2	2	0	0	0	—		32	2
Preston North End	2023–24	Championship	39	1	1	0	1	0	—		41	1
Preston North End	2024–25	Championship	40	0	4	0	4	0	—		48	0
Preston North End	2025–26	Championship	38	1	1	0	2	0	—		41	0
Preston North End	2026–27	Championship	8	1	0	0	1	0	—		9	1
Preston North End	Total		290	9	10	1	14	1	0	0	314	11
Career total			513	16	28	2	19	1	17	0	581	19
