= Josh Earl (footballer) =

English footballer (born 1998)

Personal information
- Full name: Joshua John Francis Earl
- Date of birth: 24 October 1998 (age 28)
- Place of birth: Southport, England
- Height: 1.92 m (6 ft 4 in)
- Positions: Centre-back; left-back

Team information
- Current team: Blackpool Fc
- Number: 32

Youth career
- 2007–2017: Preston North End

Senior career*
Years	Team	Apps	(Gls)
2017–2022	Preston North End	67	(1)
2017	→ Lancaster City (loan)	6	(0)
2019–2020	→ Bolton Wanderers (loan)	9	(0)
2020	→ Ipswich Town (loan)	7	(0)
2021	→ Burton Albion (loan)	8	(0)
2022–2024	Fleetwood Town	61	(3)
2024–2026	Barnsley	34	(1)
2026–	Blackpool	3	(0)
- * Club domestic league appearances and goals

Joshua John Francis Earl (born 24 October 1998) is an English professional footballer who plays as a defender for EFL League One club Blackpool fc

== Career ==
=== Preston North End ===
Earl joined Preston North End at the age of nine and signed a scholarship in July 2015. He featured for the youth team as a defender midfielder and striker. He was also part of the side that reached the FA Youth Cup quarter-finals and scored two goals during the campaign. Earl signed his first professional deal in April 2017.

On 19 August 2017, Earl made his debut in a 1–0 win over Reading. He was called into the side after Greg Cunningham was ruled out due to injury.

==== Lancaster City (loan) ====
On 24 March 2017, Earl joined Northern Premier League Division One North champions Lancaster City on loan for the remainder of the season. Earl made his debut off the bench in a 3–0 win at Radcliffe Borough the following day.

==== Bolton Wanderers (loan) ====
On 3 August 2019, Earl joined League One side Bolton Wanderers on loan until January 2020. He made his debut in a 2–0 defeat at Wycombe Wanderers the same day but had to be substituted after 15 minutes due to an injury which kept him out of action for three months. He returned to the bench on 19 October for Bolton's 1–3 defeat against Rochdale and started in the next game, Bolton's first win of the season, on 22 October, a 2–0 away win against Bristol Rovers.

==== Ipswich Town (loan) ====
On 13 January 2020, Earl joined League One side Ipswich Town on loan until the end of the 2019–20 season. He made his debut on 8 February, featuring as a second-half substitute in a 1–0 loss to Sunderland. He made 7 appearances before returning to Preston on 4 May.

==== Burton Albion (loan) ====
On 1 February 2021, Earl was loaned out again, this time joining League One side Burton Albion until the end of the season.

=== Fleetwood Town ===
On 27 June 2022, Earl joined League One club Fleetwood Town on a two-year contract after his Preston contract was terminated by mutual consent.

=== Barnsley ===
On 1 February 2024, Earl signed for League One side Barnsley on a three-and-a-half-year contract for an undisclosed fee.

=== Blackpool ===
On 26 August 2026, Earl signed for League One side Blackpool on a three-year contract for an undisclosed fee.

== Career statistics ==
As of match played 27 January 2024

Appearances and goals by club, season and competition
Club	Season	League			FA Cup		EFL Cup		Other		Total	
Club	Season	Division	Apps	Goals	Apps	Goals	Apps	Goals	Apps	Goals	Apps	Goals
Preston North End	2017–18	Championship	19	0	1	0	0	0	—		20	0
Preston North End	2018–19	Championship	14	0	0	0	2	0	—		16	0
Preston North End	2019–20	Championship	0	0	0	0	0	0	—		0	0
Preston North End	2020–21	Championship	5	0	1	0	1	0	—		7	0
Preston North End	2021–22	Championship	29	1	1	0	1	0	—		31	1
Preston North End	Total		67	1	3	0	4	0	0	0	74	1
Lancaster City (loan)	2016–17	NPL Division One North	6	0	0	0	—		0	0	6	0
Bolton Wanderers (loan)	2019–20	League One	9	0	1	0	0	0	1 (Note: Appearance in the EFL Trophy)	0	11	0
Ipswich Town (loan)	2019–20	League One	7	0	0	0	0	0	0	0	7	0
Burton Albion (loan)	2020–21	League One	8	0	1	0	0	0	0	0	9	0
Fleetwood Town	2022–23	League One	37	1	4	0	2	0	1	0	44	1
Fleetwood Town	2023–24	League One	24	2	1	1	1	0	2	1	28	4
Fleetwood Town	Total		61	3	5	1	3	0	3	1	72	5
Career total			158	4	10	1	7	0	4	1	179	6

== Honours ==
Lancaster City

- Northern Premier League Division One North: 2016–17
