= Josh Harrop =

English footballer (born 1995)

Personal information
- Full name: Joshua Andrew Harrop
- Date of birth: 15 December 1995 (age 30)
- Place of birth: Stockport, England
- Height: 5 ft 10 in (1.77 m)
- Position: Attacking midfielder

Youth career
- 2012–2017: Manchester United

Senior career*
Years	Team	Apps	(Gls)
2017	Manchester United	1	(1)
2017–2022	Preston North End	83	(7)
2021	→ Ipswich Town (loan)	15	(0)
2022	→ Fleetwood Town (loan)	5	(0)
2022–2023	Northampton Town	2	(0)
2024	Cheltenham Town	13	(0)

International career^{‡}
2014	England U20	3	(0)
- * Club domestic league appearances and goals as of 22:19, 28 July 2024 (UTC) ‡ National team caps and goals as of 17:31, 14 May 2017 (UTC)

Joshua Andrew Harrop (born 15 December 1995) is an English professional footballer who plays as a midfielder.

== Club career ==
=== Manchester United ===
Harrop marked his senior debut with a goal for United against Crystal Palace on the last day of the 2016–17 Premier League season, the first of a 2–0 win. His goal made him Manchester United's 100th different scorer in the Premier League. After finishing the season as the under-23 side's top scorer with 10 goals, Harrop rejected a contract offer from the club in June 2017.

=== Preston North End ===
On 23 June 2017, Preston North End announced Harrop would join on 3 July, signing a four-year contract for an undisclosed compensation agreement. On 29 September 2018, during a 3–2 loss to West Bromwich Albion, Harrop suffered an anterior cruciate ligament injury, which kept him out for the rest of the season. He made his return in August 2019, coming off the bench to score in a 4–0 win over Bradford City in the first round of the 2019–20 EFL Cup. He also scored in his next two matches, a 3–1 home win over Stoke City in the league and a 2–2 draw at home to Hull City in the second round of the EFL Cup, in which he also provided an assist and scored in the subsequent penalty shoot-out.

In January 2021, Harrop joined League One club Ipswich Town on loan. Harrop made 15 appearances during his loan spell at Ipswich.

On 27 January 2022, Harrop joined League One side Fleetwood Town on loan until the end of the 2021–22 season.

Harrop was placed on the transfer list on 7 May 2022 at the conclusion of the 2021–22 season. On 1 September 2022, Harrop had his contract terminated by mutual consent.

=== Northampton Town ===
On 12 December 2022, Harrop joined League Two side Northampton Town on a short-term contract.

=== Cheltenham Town ===
On 22 January 2024, Harrop joined League One club Cheltenham Town on a short-term contract until the end of the season.

== Baller League UK career ==
In 2023, Harrop joined the newly formed Baller League, assigned to the side FC Rules the World, where he played 9 games, scoring 8 times, and assisting 4 times. After FC Rules the World folded, Harrop joined Deportrio for Season 2.

== International career ==
Harrop received his first call up to the England U20 squad in September 2014. He won three caps for the under-20s in 2014.

== Career statistics ==
As of match played 20 April 2024

Appearances and goals by club, season and competition
Club	Season	League			FA Cup		League Cup		Other		Total	
Club	Season	Division	Apps	Goals	Apps	Goals	Apps	Goals	Apps	Goals	Apps	Goals
Manchester United	2016–17	Premier League	1	1	0	0	0	0	0	0	1	1
Preston North End	2017–18	Championship	38	2	1	2	0	0	—		39	4
Preston North End	2018–19	Championship	8	0	0	0	3	0	—		11	0
Preston North End	2019–20	Championship	32	5	1	1	3	2	—		36	8
Preston North End	2020–21	Championship	5	0	0	0	3	1	—		8	1
Preston North End	2021–22	Championship	0	0	1	0	0	0	—		1	0
Preston North End	2022–23	Championship	0	0	0	0	0	0	—		0	0
Preston North End	Total		83	7	3	3	9	3	0	0	95	13
Ipswich Town (loan)	2020–21	League One	15	0	0	0	0	0	0	0	15	0
Fleetwood Town (loan)	2021–22	League One	5	0	0	0	0	0	0	0	5	0
Northampton Town	2022–23	League Two	2	0	0	0	0	0	0	0	2	0
Cheltenham Town	2023–24	League One	13	0	0	0	0	0	0	0	13	0
Career total			119	8	3	3	9	3	0	0	131	14
