= Jayden Stockley =

English footballer (born 1993)

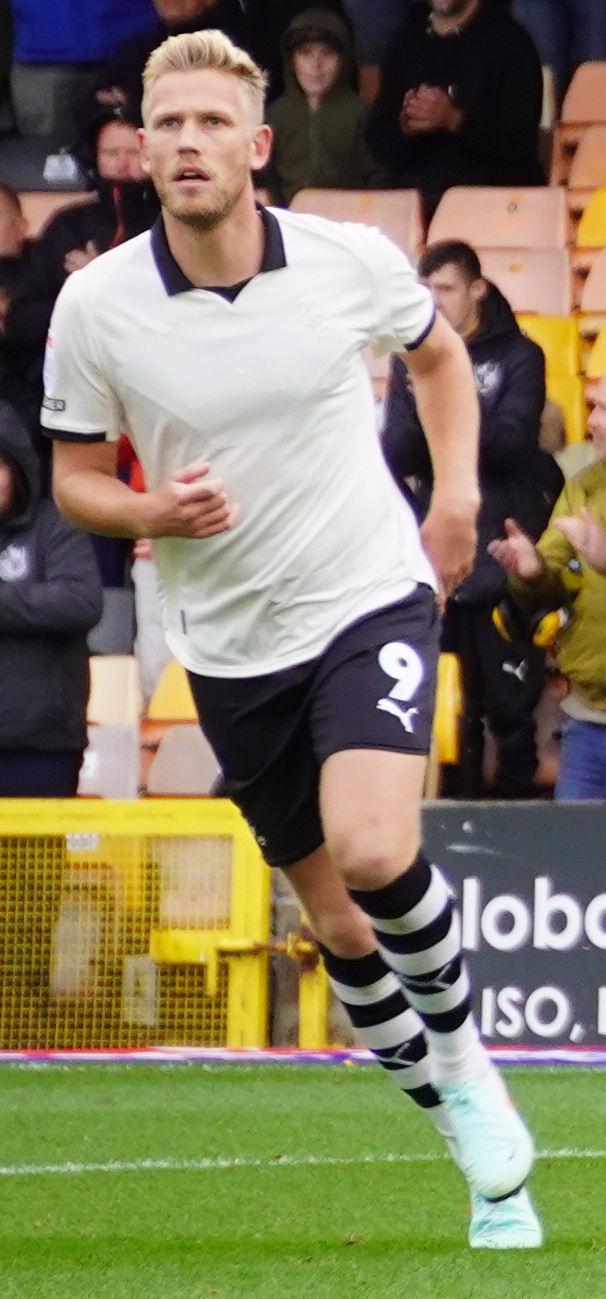
- Stockley with Port Vale (2025)

Personal information
- Full name: Jayden Connor Stockley
- Date of birth: 15 September 1993 (age 33)
- Place of birth: Poole, England
- Height: 6 ft 3 in (1.91 m)
- Position: Forward

Team information
- Current team: AFC Wimbledon
- Number: 9

Youth career
- 2000–2009: AFC Bournemouth

Senior career*
Years	Team	Apps	(Gls)
2009–2016	AFC Bournemouth	16	(0)
2011	→ Dorchester Town (loan)	5	(2)
2011–2012	→ Accrington Stanley (loan)	9	(3)
2012–2013	→ Woking (loan)	26	(10)
2013	→ Leyton Orient (loan)	8	(1)
2013–2014	→ Torquay United (loan)	19	(1)
2014	→ Cambridge United (loan)	3	(2)
2015	→ Luton Town (loan)	13	(3)
2015–2016	→ Portsmouth (loan)	9	(2)
2016	→ Exeter City (loan)	22	(10)
2016–2017	Aberdeen	27	(5)
2017–2019	Exeter City	66	(36)
2019–2021	Preston North End	65	(9)
2021	→ Charlton Athletic (loan)	22	(8)
2021–2023	Charlton Athletic	57	(15)
2023–2024	Fleetwood Town	55	(12)
2024–2026	Port Vale	60	(14)
2026–	AFC Wimbledon	13	(6)
- * Club domestic league appearances and goals as of 1 November 2026 (UTC)

Jayden Connor Stockley (born 15 September 1993) is an English professional footballer who plays as a forward for EFL League One club AFC Wimbledon.

Stockley came through the youth system at AFC Bournemouth to make his professional debut at age 16 in 2009. He spent time on loan at Dorchester Town, Accrington Stanley, Woking, Leyton Orient, Torquay United, Cambridge United, Luton Town, Portsmouth and Exeter City. He left Bournemouth in May 2016 and spent two seasons in the Scottish Premiership with Aberdeen, featuring in Scottish League Cup and Scottish Cup final defeats in the 2016–17 campaign. He was sold to Exeter City in August 2017, where he scored 41 goals in one-and-a-half seasons. He joined Preston North End for a fee of £750,000 in January 2019. He scored nine Championship goals before being loaned out to Charlton Athletic in January 2021. He joined Charlton permanently in the summer for £450,000 and was the club's top-scorer for the 2021–22 season. He was signed to Fleetwood Town for an undisclosed fee in January 2023 and became the club's top-scorer in the 2023–24 season before he was sold to Port Vale in June 2024. He was promoted out of League Two with the club at the end of the 2024–25 season. He joined AFC Wimbledon in August 2026.

== Career ==
=== AFC Bournemouth ===
Jayden Connor Stockley was born on 15 September 1993 in Poole, Dorset. He attended Lytchett Minster School. He started his career as a youth player at AFC Bournemouth, entering the Centre of Excellence aged seven. He enjoyed being at the club, though came close to joining Portsmouth when Bournemouth entered administration in 2008. At the age of 16 years, manager Eddie Howe called him up to be a substitute for their match at home to Burton Albion on 26 September 2009, due to an injury crisis within the Bournemouth squad, and the block on Bournemouth's transfer activity as they owed money to HM Revenue and Customs. Howe needed permission from his school, as he had to miss exam preparation. Howe said; "I had to phone Jayden's school to get permission to let him play against Burton and I shall call them again to see if they'll let me have him on Tuesday".

He made his debut for Bournemouth on 6 October away against Northampton Town in their 2–1 defeat in the Football League Trophy; Danny Ings also debuted in the game. Stockley was the second youngest player to ever take to the field for Bournemouth. Responding to his age, he said; "At the end of the day, you have to get on with your job—it doesn't matter how old you are. There are no excuses. If Eddie thinks I am ready to come in now then I'm ready." Stockley made his debut in the Football League in Bournemouth's subsequent League Two game against Chesterfield on 10 October, replacing Ryan Garry as a substitute in the 89th minute. He signed a five-year contract with Bournemouth in November 2009. He joined Conference South side Dorchester Town on loan for one month on 7 January 2011 and scored two goals on his debut the following day in a 3–2 defeat at Ebbsfleet United. He made a further six appearances for Ashley Vickers's Magpies, without adding to his goal tally.

On 30 August 2011, he scored a brace after coming off the bench in a 4–1 win over Hereford United in a Football League Trophy fixture at Dean Court. On 4 November, Stockley joined League Two club Accrington Stanley on an initial one-month loan deal. He debuted for the Reds the following day in a 2–1 win over Bristol Rovers at the Crown Ground. He scored his first Football League goal in a 1–1 draw at Macclesfield Town on 19 November. He returned to Bournemouth on 9 January, having made ten appearances and scored three goals. In 2019, he said that Accrington was one of his best loan spells and that "John Coleman and his No.2 Jimmy Bell were great with me". He joined Aldershot Town for a light training session with the prospect of joining the club on loan, though no move materialised. He played what turned out to be his last game for Bournemouth in Lee Bradbury's final game as manager in March 2012.

Stockley was demoted to the Development squad at Bournemouth by short-lived manager Paul Groves. Eddie Howe returned him to the first-team squad after returning as manager in October 2012. On 14 November, having not featured for the Cherries in eight months, he joined Conference National side Woking on loan until January 2013. His loan was extended until the end of the 2012–13 season. He was reported to be "blossoming under Garry Hill" after hitting a 25 yards (23 m) volley in a 1–1 draw at Braintree Town on 19 March. He totalled 14 goals in 29 games during his spell at the Kingfield Stadium.

On 2 September 2013, he was loaned to Leyton Orient for a month, where manager Russell Slade was looking to add depth behind the strike partnership of Kevin Lisbie and Dave Mooney. After making five appearances in all competitions for Orient, he had his loan extended until 4 January. However, he played less than an hour of League One football in his eight substitute appearances for the O's, though he did score a goal against Notts County at Brisbane Road. Bournemouth recalled him on 28 November and sent him on loan to Torquay United, who would be managed by his former coach at Bournemouth, Chris Hargreaves, after the sacking of Alan Knill. The loan was curtailed after three substitute appearances due to injury, though was resumed for a further month on 9 January. He scored his first goal for the club two days later to give Hargreaves his first win as manager, a 2–0 victory at AFC Wimbledon. The Gulls struggled for goals, however, and remained at the bottom of the Football League. On 5 April, he was sent off for elbowing Scunthorpe United defender David Mirfin. At the end of the season, he signed a new 12-month contract with Bournemouth, and Howe said it would be a "big year" for the player.

On 22 August 2014, he joined League Two club Cambridge United on loan until January. Eight days later, he scored twice on the debut for the U's in a 5–0 victory over Carlisle United at the Abbey Stadium. However, he only started two games, playing 135 minutes during a four-match loan spell. He said that he ended the loan spell early as he was not getting game time at Cambridge and had a better chance of earning a new contract at Bournemouth by impressing in reserve team games there. On 7 January 2015, Stockley signed on a one-month loan for League Two side Luton Town. Manager John Still extended the loan into a second month after Stockley made four hard-working performances at Kenilworth Road. The loan was extended into a third and final month as he continued to impress Still. He returned to Bournemouth on 13 April, having scored three times in 13 games for the Hatters.

Stockley signed on loan for Portsmouth at the start of the 2015–16 League Two season, and also signed a new one-year contract with Bournemouth. He spent six months at Fratton Park, scoring two goals in twelve games – a winner at Bristol Rovers and an equaliser at home to Morecambe, though manager Paul Cook could not guarantee him regular first-team football. On 11 January 2016, he joined League Two side Exeter City on loan until the end of the 2015–16 season. He was the club's joint top scorer, along with Tom Nichols on ten goals, at the end of the 2015–16 season. Exeter made two contract offers in an attempt to sign Stockley permanently.

Stockley made 22 appearances for Bournemouth but did not play in his last four seasons at the club. Howe had noted that Stockley had missed first-team chances due to the club's rapid rise through the leagues. Stockley later said that "I always felt I was playing catch up with Bournemouth's successes... I had to sit and watch promotion after promotion".

=== Aberdeen ===
On 11 May 2016, Stockley signed a pre-contract (two-year) agreement with Scottish Premiership side Aberdeen ahead of his Bournemouth contract expiring at the end of the following month. He made his debut on 30 June in a Europa League first qualifying round tie against Fola Esch. He scored his first goal for the club in the following round, in a 3–0 win against Ventspils. However, he was sent off in a defeat to NK Maribor in the following round after receiving two yellow cards for elbowing. He scored his first league goal for the Dons at Dundee on 18 September, and manager Derek McInnes praised him after the match for his contribution to the 3–1 win. McInnes was again fulsome in his praise for Stockley after the striker scored the winning goal at Partick Thistle with a "glorious left-footed chip". He played in the November 2016 Scottish League Cup final defeat to Celtic at Hampden Park. However, he found himself dropping down the pecking order as the 2016–17 season progressed. His final two matches of the season were a league win over rivals Rangers in which he was introduced as a substitute and sent off for two bookings, and the 2017 Scottish Cup final, a defeat to Celtic in which he broke Kieran Tierney's jaw. He was not booked or given any retrospective punishment for the challenge on Tierney as referee Bobby Madden had witnessed the incident, though Stockley had been sent off three times throughout the campaign for elbowing opponents.

=== Exeter City ===
On transfer deadline day, 31 August 2017, Stockley signed for his previous loan club, Exeter City, for a club record fee believed to be £100,000. Manager Paul Tisdale said it was a necessary move for the club after the sales of Ollie Watkins and David Wheeler. He scored 25 goals to become the club's top-scorer for the 2017–18 campaign. He scored in front of the Big Bank at St James Park in a 3–1 win over Lincoln City in the second leg of the play-off semi-finals, which he described as "his most important goal... to date". He played in the final, a 3–1 defeat to Coventry City at Wembley Stadium, in which he had two headers saved by Lee Burge.

He scored a hat-trick in a 3–2 win at Oldham Athletic on 22 December 2018. Despite spending only half the season with Exeter, he scored 16 league goals in the 2018–19 campaign to finish as the club's top-scorer again and the sixth-highest scorer in League Two. Having been voted as the club's Player of the Month, negotiations opened with several clubs after his release clause was met in the January transfer window. He was linked with a £450,000 move to Portsmouth, but instead chose to go elsewhere. Manager Matt Taylor said that "he's been an excellent servant for this club". Stockley, who had scored 51 times in 97 games for the Grecians, said that he and his young family and been "properly happy" at Exeter. The club replaced him by signing Ryan Bowman from Motherwell.

=== Preston North End ===
On 3 January 2019, Stockley signed a three-and-a-half-year deal with Preston North End for a reported fee of £750,000 as manager Alex Neil looked to replace Jordan Hugill. Preston had faced competition from several other clubs for the signing after he had scored more league goals (including play-off games) than any other player in the top four tiers of English football in the calendar year of 2018. He scored his first goal for the Lilywhites in his second appearance, a 4–1 win at Queens Park Rangers. On 13 March, he scored the winning goal against Middlesbrough to give Preston their first win at the Riverside Stadium, which he described as "a magical feeling". He scored four goals in 17 Championship games for PNE in the second half of the 2018–19 season.

He enjoyed a good run of form playing as a target man forward in the 2019–20 campaign, starting in a 3–2 win over Blackburn Rovers in October. However, after four starts in the next five games, he was returned to the bench until June as he lacked the mobility that Neil wanted in a striker. He made nine Championship starts in the season, playing 35 games in all competitions and scoring four goals.

He was nominated for the Championship Goal of the Month award for October 2020 for his 30 yards (27 m) strike against Birmingham City at Deepdale. However, by this stage he was the fourth-choice striker in a 4–2–3–1 system. Preston made him available for loan or transfer in the January 2021 transfer window, with both League One clubs Bristol Rovers and Sunderland heavily linked. Stockley scored nine goals in 71 appearances for the club over a two-and-a-half-year stay. More than half of his league appearances were as a substitute, and the club failed to play to his strengths.

=== Charlton Athletic ===
On 22 January 2021, Stockley joined Charlton Athletic on loan for the rest of the 2020–21 season, with manager Lee Bowyer's side in the League One play-offs in sixth-place. He scored his first goal for Charlton in a 3–1 defeat to Portsmouth on 2 February and was described by Bowyer as a "nightmare" for defenders and a "constant threat". On 20 March, he scored in the South London derby as Charlton secured a 2–2 draw at AFC Wimbledon. His first six goals for the Addicks all came from headers, though he missed a crucial penalty in a 1–0 defeat by Peterborough United at The Valley. He scored eight goals in 22 appearances as Charlton missed out on the play-offs on goal difference.

On 15 June 2021, Stockley signed for Charlton Athletic for an undisclosed fee – reported to be around £450,000, signing a three-year deal. He was dropped by short-lived manager Nigel Adkins after failing to score as a lone striker in September. He was returned to the first XI the following month as part of a switch in formation to a front two by Adkins's successor, Johnnie Jackson. On 23 October, Sunderland manager Lee Johnson claimed that Stockley had headbutted Tom Flanagan and called on The Football Association to investigate the incident. Stockley denied any violent conduct and said such comments could negatively influence referees against him. On 13 November, Stockley was sent off by referee Trevor Kettle for an off the ball incident with Burton Albion defender Deji Oshilaja; Jackson said the club would appeal the decision. He played for three months whilst suffering from foot drop due to two slipped discs in his back. He scored 20 goals in the 2021–22 season to finish as the club's top-scorer, and his four FA Cup goals made him the competition's joint top scorer alongside Manchester City's Riyad Mahrez.

He was appointed as the club captain by newly-appointed manager Ben Garner in July 2022. Stockley was retrospectively handed a three-match ban for violent conduct after elbowing Port Vale defender Nathan Smith in a 1–0 defeat on 19 November amid reports that he was frustrated by the style of play employed by Garner. He fell out of favour after Dean Holden was appointed manager in December. Holden removed the captaincy from him and preferred to play Miles Leaburn and Macauley Bonne. He opted to leave the club in January 2023 after a period of struggling for game time. Including both spells at Charlton, Stockley scored 31 goals and recorded six assists in 89 appearances.

=== Fleetwood Town ===
On 30 January 2023, Stockley joined Fleetwood Town for an undisclosed fee, signing a two-and-a-half-year deal. He said the signing of Jack Marriott was a "big pull" as it showed "vision from the club". He was sent off in the penultimate game of the 2022–23 season, a 2–0 defeat at Bolton Wanderers, following an off the ball incident with MJ Williams; manager Scott Brown said it was a "poor decision". He scored a brace to give Fleetwood a point at Port Vale on 27 February 2024, which gave manager Charlie Adam pride in the team's "attitude and hunger". He was named to the League One Team of the Week for his performance in a 4–2 win over Wigan Athletic at Highbury Stadium on 2 March. Fleetwood fans also voted him as their Player of the Month. He was the club's top-scorer in the 2023–24 season with ten goals, though Fleetwood were relegated from League One. He was also named the club's PFA Community Champion of the Year for his interaction during community engagement projects.

=== Port Vale ===
On 21 June 2024, Stockley signed for League Two club Port Vale for an undisclosed fee, signing a two-year deal. Manager Darren Moore had previously tried to sign him at Sheffield Wednesday. He made his first league start for the Valiants on 7 September, scoring two goals and winning 12 aerial duals in a 4–1 win at Newport County and was subsequently named in the EFL League Two Team of the Week. He was nominated for September's EFL League Two Player of the Month award and was voted as PFA League Two Fans' Player of the Month. He maintained his good form through October as the club established a four-point lead at the top of the table. On 26 October, he scored a goal and provided an assist in a 3–2 home win over AFC Wimbledon. He remained a key player until he was sidelined with a rib injury in February. He marked his first start since recovering from the injury with a goal and an assist in a 3–0 win over Milton Keynes Dons at Vale Park on 15 March, also making four key passes and winning 15 aerial duels in the match. On 29 March, he scored the only goal of the game at nearby rivals Crewe Alexandra, also winning 14 aerial duels to earn himself inclusion on the EFL Team of the Week. He won the PFA Community Award at the club's end of season ceremony. He scored seven headed goals in the 2024–25 season, more than any other player in the division, and won 306 aerial duels – 20% of the team's total. He was named on WhoScored's League Two Team of the Season, which ended in promotion for the club.

He was sidelined in August 2025 after picking up a muscle injury during training. He regained fitness the following month and slowly made his way back into the squad. He scored his first goal of the 2025–26 season in the 5–1 New Year's Day win over Blackpool, which was only his fourth start of the campaign. Having been largely sidelined under Darren Moore in League One, Stockley was returned to the first XI by new manager Jon Brady. However, he was sidelined after picking up a calf injury during training in March. He was named as the club's PFA Community Champion for the 2025–26 season. He made 69 appearances across all competitions for Vale, scoring 14 and assisting on six occasions.

=== AFC Wimbledon ===
On 5 August 2026, Stockley returned to League One after signing a two-year deal with AFC Wimbledon to reunite with former Charlton boss Johnnie Jackson. On 7 September, he scored in his second consecutive game to help secure a 2–0 win at South London derby rivals Bromley. He was nominated for September's League One Player of the Month award with three goals and one assist, described as being "dominant in aerial duels" whilst showing "a superbly timed header [and] deft chest control... to complement his hold-up play" .

== Style of play ==
Stockley reportedly scored more headed goals in 2018 than any player in the top European leagues. He was nicknamed 'the headmaster' at Charlton. In 2021, he said that "there has got to be fast and creative players around me" as he lacks pace, though he can hold the ball up and bring others into play.

== Personal life ==
Stockley's third child was born in March 2022. He supports Manchester United and Lancashire County Cricket Club. He holds a master's degree in sports business.

== Career statistics ==
As of match played 7 September 2026

Appearances and goals by club, season and competition
Club	Season	League			National cup (Note: Includes FA Cup, Scottish Cup)		League cup (Note: Includes EFL Cup, Scottish League Cup)		Other		Total	
Club	Season	Division	Apps	Goals	Apps	Goals	Apps	Goals	Apps	Goals	Apps	Goals
AFC Bournemouth	2009–10	League Two	2	0	0	0	0	0	1 (Note: Appearance(s) in Football League Trophy / EFL Trophy)	0	3	0
AFC Bournemouth	2010–11	League One	4	0	0	0	0	0	1	0	5	0
AFC Bournemouth	2011–12	League One	10	0	0	0	2	0	2	2	14	2
AFC Bournemouth	2012–13	League One	0	0	0	0	0	0	0	0	0	0
AFC Bournemouth	2013–14	Championship	0	0	0	0	0	0	—		0	0
AFC Bournemouth	2014–15	Championship	0	0	0	0	0	0	—		0	0
AFC Bournemouth	2015–16	Premier League	0	0	0	0	0	0	—		0	0
AFC Bournemouth	Total		16	0	0	0	2	0	4	2	22	2
Dorchester Town (loan)	2010–11	Conference South	5	2	0	0	—		2 (Note: Appearances in FA Trophy)	0	7	2
Accrington Stanley (loan)	2011–12	League Two	9	3	1	0	—		—		10	3
Woking (loan)	2012–13	Conference Premier	26	10	0	0	—		3 (Note: One appearance and two goals in FA Trophy, two appearances and two goals in Surrey Senior Cup)	4	29	14
Leyton Orient (loan)	2013–14	League One	8	1	0	0	—		3	0	11	1
Torquay United (loan)	2013–14	League Two	19	1	—		—		—		19	1
Cambridge United (loan)	2014–15	League Two	3	2	0	0	—		1	0	4	2
Luton Town (loan)	2014–15	League Two	13	3	—		—		—		13	3
Portsmouth (loan)	2015–16	League Two	9	2	1	0	2	0	0	0	12	2
Exeter City (loan)	2015–16	League Two	22	10	0	0	—		0	0	22	10
Aberdeen	2016–17	Scottish Premiership	27	5	3	0	3	0	6 (Note: Appearances in UEFA Europa League)	1	39	6
Aberdeen	2017–18	Scottish Premiership	0	0	0	0	0	0	2	0	2	0
Aberdeen	Total		27	5	3	0	3	0	8	1	41	6
Exeter City	2017–18	League Two	41	20	4	5	—		3 (Note: Appearances in League Two play-offs)	1	48	25
Exeter City	2018–19	League Two	25	16	1	0	1	0	1	0	28	16
Exeter City	Total		66	36	5	5	1	0	4	1	76	42
Preston North End	2018–19	Championship	17	4	0	0	—		—		17	4
Preston North End	2019–20	Championship	32	4	1	0	2	0	—		35	4
Preston North End	2020–21	Championship	16	1	1	0	2	0	—		19	1
Preston North End	Total		65	9	2	0	4	0	—		71	9
Charlton Athletic (loan)	2020–21	League One	22	8	—		—		—		22	8
Charlton Athletic	2021–22	League One	33	13	2	4	1	0	2	3	38	20
Charlton Athletic	2022–23	League One	24	2	1	1	4	0	0	0	29	3
Charlton Athletic	Total		79	23	3	5	5	0	2	3	89	31
Fleetwood Town	2022–23	League One	18	3	0	0	—		—		18	3
Fleetwood Town	2023–24	League One	37	9	1	0	0	0	3	1	41	10
Fleetwood Town	Total		55	12	1	0	0	0	3	1	59	13
Port Vale	2024–25	League Two	38	11	1	0	0	0	2	0	41	11
Port Vale	2025–26	League One	22	3	1	0	2	0	3	0	28	3
Port Vale	Total		60	14	2	0	2	0	5	0	69	14
AFC Wimbledon	2026–27	League One	5	2	0	0	2	0	1	1	8	3
Career total			487	135	18	10	21	0	36	13	562	158

== Honours ==
Aberdeen

- Scottish League Cup runner-up: 2016 (November)
- Scottish Cup runner-up: 2017

Port Vale

- EFL League Two second-place promotion: 2024–25
