= Jordan Storey =

English footballer (born 1997)

Personal information
- Full name: Jordan Ben Storey
- Date of birth: 2 September 1997 (age 29)
- Place of birth: Stoke-sub-Hamdon, England
- Height: 6 ft 2 in (1.88 m)
- Position: Defender

Team information
- Current team: Preston North End
- Number: 14

Youth career
- Mere Town
- Chard Town
- –2016: Exeter City

Senior career*
Years	Team	Apps	(Gls)
2016–2018	Exeter City	13	(2)
2016	→ Bideford (loan)	5	(0)
2017	→ Tiverton Town (loan)	6	(0)
2017	→ Dorchester Town (loan)	13	(0)
2018–	Preston North End	226	(7)
2022	→ Sheffield Wednesday (loan)	19	(2)
- * Club domestic league appearances and goals as of 13 December 2025

Jordan Ben Storey (born 2 September 1997) is an English professional footballer who plays as a defender for EFL Championship club Preston North End.

He has previously played for Exeter City, and on loan at Bideford, Tiverton Town, and Dorchester Town.

== Playing career ==
=== Exeter City ===
Prior to joining the Exeter City Academy, Storey played for South Petherton, Chard Town and Mere Town. He joined Southern League Premier Division side Bideford on a short-term loan in March 2016, before being offered professional terms in May of the same year. He made his first-team debut for Exeter on 30 August 2016, coming on as a 62nd-minute substitute for Pierce Sweeney in a 4–2 defeat at Oxford United in an EFL Trophy group stage match.

Storey joined Southern League Division One South & West side Tiverton Town in March 2017, playing 6 times as they clinched promotion to the Southern League Premier Division. The young defender began the following season on loan at Dorchester Town, playing 13 fixtures before being recalled by Exeter in late October due to an accumulation of injuries to first-team defenders. He made his league debut in a 1–1 draw at Mansfield Town on 28 October 2017, being subbed on in the 94th minute in place of striker Reuben Reid after right-back Kane Wilson was sent off.

Storey's first league start came in a 1–0 defeat to Luton Town at Kenilworth Road on 3 February 2018. The following month, Storey scored his first goal in professional football − a left-footed volley in a 1–0 victory over Port Vale at Vale Park. He made 17 appearances in all competitions scoring 2 goals during the 2017–18 season as he helped Exeter reach the 2018 EFL League Two play-off final, which they lost on 28 May against Coventry City.

=== Preston North End ===
On 12 June 2018, Storey signed for EFL Championship side Preston North End on a four-year contract, moving for a 'substantial undisclosed fee'. On 20 September 2021, Storey signed a 3-year contract extension with the Lilywhites following a strong start to the 2021/2022 season.

On 19 January 2022, he was sent on loan to Sheffield Wednesday for the remainder of the season. He would make his debut on 29 January, starting the game against Ipswich Town. His first goal of his loan spell would be against Bolton Wanderers on 9 April 2022.

== Statistics ==
As of match played 13 December 2025

Appearances and goals by club, season and competition
Club	Season	Division	League		FA Cup		EFL Cup		Other		Total	
Club	Season	Division	Apps	Goals	Apps	Goals	Apps	Goals	Apps	Goals	Apps	Goals
Exeter City	2015–16	EFL League Two	0	0	0	0	0	0	0	0	0	0
Exeter City	2016–17	EFL League Two	0	0	0	0	0	0	1 (Note: Appearance in EFL Trophy)	0	1	0
Exeter City	2017–18	EFL League Two	13	2	0	0	0	0	4 (Note: One appearance in EFL Trophy, three appearances in EFL League Two play-offs)	0	17	2
Exeter City	Total		13	2	0	0	0	0	5	0	18	2
Bideford (loan)	2015–16	Southern League Premier Division	5	0	0	0	0	0	0	0	5	0
Tiverton Town (loan)	2016–17	Southern League South & West	6	0	0	0	0	0	0	0	6	0
Dorchester Town (loan)	2017–18	Southern League Premier Division	13	0	1	0	0	0	1 (Note: Appearance in Southern Football League Cup)	0	15	0
Preston North End	2018–19	EFL Championship	28	1	1	0	3	0	0	0	32	1
Preston North End	2019–20	EFL Championship	10	0	1	0	3	0	0	0	14	0
Preston North End	2020–21	EFL Championship	30	1	1	0	1	0	0	0	32	1
Preston North End	2021–22	EFL Championship	17	0	0	0	3	0	0	0	20	0
Preston North End	2022–23	EFL Championship	44	2	1	0	2	0	0	0	47	2
Preston North End	2023–24	EFL Championship	41	0	1	0	1	0	0	0	43	0
Preston North End	2024–25	EFL Championship	35	1	2	0	4	0	—		41	1
Preston North End	2025–26	EFL Championship	21	2	0	0	1	0	—		22	2
Preston North End	Total		226	7	7	0	18	0	0	0	251	7
Sheffield Wednesday (loan)	2021–22	EFL League One	19	2	0	0	0	0	2 (Note: Appearance(s) in League One Play-offs)	0	21	2
Career total			282	11	8	0	18	0	8	0	316	11
