= Connor Simpson =

English footballer

Personal information
- Full name: Connor Mark Simpson
- Date of birth: 24 January 2000 (age 26)
- Place of birth: Guisborough, England
- Height: 6 ft 5 in (1.96 m)
- Position: Forward

Team information
- Current team: Sunshine Coast Wanderers

Youth career
- –2017: Hartlepool United

Senior career*
Years	Team	Apps	(Gls)
2017–2018	Hartlepool United	9	(1)
2018–2020	Preston North End	1	(0)
2018	→ Lancaster City (loan)	6	(1)
2018	→ Hyde United (loan)	14	(8)
2019	→ Carlisle United (loan)	8	(1)
2019–2020	→ Accrington Stanley (loan)	2	(0)
2020	Cork City	5	(0)
2020–2021	Scarborough Athletic	0	(0)
2021–2022	Kórdrengir	19	(5)
2022	Connah's Quay Nomads	3	(1)
2022	Marske United	12	(3)
2022–2024	Whitby Town	35	(5)
2024	Sorrento	17	(10)
2024	Whitby Town	8	(1)
2025–	Sunshine Coast Wanderers	14	(3)
- * Club domestic league appearances and goals as of 09:30, 11 July 2025 (UTC)

Connor Mark Simpson (born 24 January 2000) is an English professional footballer who plays as a forward for National Premier Leagues Queensland side Sunshine Coast Wanderers.

Simpson has played in the English Football League for Hartlepool United, Preston North End, Carlisle United and Accrington Stanley. He is a well travelled striker and has also played in Ireland, Wales, Iceland and Australia.

== Playing career ==
Simpson made his senior debut for Hartlepool as a substitute for Lewis Hawkins in a 1–0 defeat to Cheltenham Town on 29 April 2017. On 2 September 2017, he scored his first goal for Hartlepool on his first senior start for the club in a 3–1 win over Maidstone United. The goal meant that he was the first player born in the 21st century to have scored for Hartlepool United.

Simpson left Hartlepool to join Championship side Preston North End in January 2018 for a fee of £50,000. He made his Preston debut in January 2018 coming on as a late substitute against Aston Villa.

Simpson joined Northern Premier League club Hyde United on a short-term loan deal in October 2018 and scored in his second appearance for the club against South Shields. After scoring five goals in nine games for Hyde, his loan deal was extended until January 2019.

Simpson then joined League Two side Carlisle United on loan until the end of the 2018–19 season. He played eight times for the club, scoring once.

On 2 September 2019, he joined League One side Accrington Stanley on a season-long loan deal. He scored once for Accrington in an EFL Trophy win against Liverpool U23s.

Simpson was released by Preston at the end of 2019–20 season and ended up signing for League of Ireland side Cork City. He left Cork three months later and signed for Scarborough Athletic in October 2020. In February 2021, he went on trial with Norwich City. Due to Scarborough's season being cancelled due to the COVID-19 outbreak, he failed to play to a single game for the non-league club and signed for Icelandic side Kórdrengir in April 2021.

In January 2022, he moved to Cymru Premier side Connah's Quay Nomads. On 6 February 2022, Simpson scored in a penalty shootout win in the Welsh League Cup final.

On 8 July 2022, Simpson moved back to North–East England when he signed for Northern Premier League club Marske United. On 24 November 2022, he signed for fellow Northern Premier League club Whitby Town for an undisclosed fee. His long range goal for Whitby in a 7–2 FA Cup first round defeat away to League One side Bristol Rovers in November 2023 was one of four goals to be nominated for the Goal of the Round competition. In January 2024, it was announced he had left Whitby by mutual consent.

On 31 January 2024, it was announced that he had signed for Australian side Sorrento. Simpson made 17 league appearances for the club, scoring 10 times. After his contract with Sorrento expired in October 2024, he moved back to England signing for his former club Whitby Town. In December 2024, Simpson left Whitby to move back to Australia. In February 2025, he made his debut for Sunshine Coast Wanderers against Olympic FC in the National Premier Leagues Queensland. The following week, he scored his first goal for the club in a 3–1 defeat against Peninsula Power.

== Career statistics ==
As of match played 1 January 2018

Appearances and goals by club, season and competition
Club	Season	League			FA Cup		League Cup		Other		Total	
Club	Season	Division	Apps	Goals	Apps	Goals	Apps	Goals	Apps	Goals	Apps	Goals
Hartlepool United	2016–17	League Two	2	0	0	0	0	0	0	0	2	0
Hartlepool United	2017–18	National League	7	1	0	0	0	0	0	0	7	1
Hartlepool United	Total		9	1	0	0	0	0	0	0	9	1
Preston North End	2018–19	Championship	1	0	0	0	0	0	0	0	1	0
Preston North End	Career totals		10	1	0	0	0	0	0	0	10	1
