= 2021–22 Preston North End F.C. season =

English football club season

Preston North End F.C.
2021–22 season
- Manager: Frankie McAvoy (until 6 December); Ryan Lowe (from 7 December)
- Stadium: Deepdale
- Championship: 13th
- FA Cup: Third round
- EFL Cup: Fourth round
- Top goalscorer: League: Emil Riis Jakobsen (17); All: Emil Riis Jakobsen (21)
Home colours	Away colours	Third colours

The 2021–22 Preston North End F.C. season was the 142nd edition in Preston North End F.C. existence and their seventh consecutive season in the Championship. They contested the FA Cup and the EFL Cup. The season covered the period from July 2021 to 30 June 2022.

== Squad ==
As of 1 September 2021

Note: Flags indicate national team as has been defined under FIFA eligibility rules. Players may hold more than one non-FIFA nationality.

No.	Name	Nat.	Position(s)	Date of birth (age)	Apps.	Goals	Year signed	Signed from	Transfer fee	Ends
Goalkeepers
12	Daniel Iversen	(Denmark)	GK	19 July 1997 (age 29)	70	0	2021	(England) Leicester City	Loan	2022
25	Connor Ripley	(England)	GK	13 February 1993 (age 33)	10	0	2019	(England) Middlesbrough	Undisclosed	2022
28	Mathew Hudson	(England)	GK	29 July 1998 (age 28)	1	0	2014	Academy	Trainee	2022
35	Oliver Lombard	(England)	GK	6 January 2003 (age 23)	0	0	2021	Academy	Trainee	2022
Defenders
2	Sepp van den Berg	(Netherlands)	CB/RB	20 December 2001 (age 24)	65	2	2021	(England) Liverpool	Loan	2022
3	Greg Cunningham	(Republic of Ireland)	LB/CB	31 January 1991 (age 35)	147	5	2021	(Wales) Cardiff City	Undisclosed	2023
5	Patrick Bauer	(Germany)	CB	28 October 1992 (age 34)	92	8	2019	(England) Charlton Athletic	Free	2022
6	Liam Lindsay	(Scotland)	CB	12 October 1995 (age 31)	29	2	2021	(England) Stoke City	Undisclosed	2023
15	Joe Rafferty	(Republic of Ireland) (England)	RB/LB/DM	6 October 1993 (age 33)	72	2	2019	(England) Rochdale	Undisclosed	2022
16	Andrew Hughes	(Wales)	LB/CB	5 June 1992 (age 34)	142	6	2018	(England) Peterborough United	Undisclosed	2022
22	Matthew Olosunde	(United States)	RB/CB	7 March 1998 (age 28)	1	0	2021	(England) Rotherham United	Free	2023
23	Paul Huntington	(England)	CB	17 September 1987 (age 39)	306	18	2012	(England) Yeovil Town	Free	2022
32	Josh Earl	(England)	LB/CB	24 October 1998 (age 28)	73	1	2017	Academy	Trainee	2023
34	Lewis Coulton	(Scotland) (England)	LB	3 March 2003 (age 23)	0	0	2021	Academy	Trainee	2022
41	Bambo Diaby	(Senegal)	CB	17 December 1997 (age 28)	7	0	2022	Free Agent	Free	2022
Midfielders
4	Benjamin Whiteman	(England)	CM/AM/RM	17 June 1996 (age 30)	70	5	2021	(England) Doncaster Rovers	Undislosed	2024
8	Alan Browne	(Republic of Ireland)	CM/DM/AM/RB	15 April 1995 (age 31)	333	39	2014	Free Agent	Free	2024
11	Daniel Johnson	(Jamaica)	AM/CM	8 October 1992 (age 34)	298	56	2015	(England) Aston Villa	£50,000	2023
13	Ali McCann	(Northern Ireland) (Scotland)	CM/AM/DM	4 December 1999 (age 26)	31	1	2021	(Scotland) St Johnstone	Undisclosed	2025
18	Ryan Ledson	(England)	CM/DM	19 August 1997 (age 29)	110	3	2018	(England) Oxford United	Undisclosed	2023
39	Mikey O'Neill	(England)	AM/CF	8 June 2004 (age 22)	3	0	2020	Academy	Trainee	2024
26	Adam O'Reilly	(Republic of Ireland)	CM	11 May 2001 (age 25)	1	0	2016	(Republic of Ireland) Ringmahon Rangers	Undisclosed	2023
30	Jack Baxter	(England)	DM/CM	17 October 2000 (age 26)	0	0	2017	Academy	Trainee	2022
44	Brad Potts	(England)	CM/RM/AM	3 July 1994 (age 32)	131	10	2019	(England) Barnsley	Undisclosed	2022
45	Josh Murphy	(England)	LW/RW/SS	24 February 1995 (age 31)	13	0	2021	(Wales) Cardiff City	Loan	2022
Forwards
9	Ched Evans	(Wales)	CF	28 December 1988 (age 37)	44	7	2021	(England) Fleetwood Town	Undisclosed	2023
19	Emil Riis Jakobsen	(Denmark)	CF	24 June 1998 (age 28)	88	23	2020	(Denmark) Randers	Undisclosed	2024
20	Izzy Brown	(England)	SS/RW/LW	7 January 1997 (age 29)	0	0	2021	(England) Chelsea	Free	2022
21	Cameron Archer	(England)	CF	9 December 2001 (age 24)	20	7	2022	(England) Aston Villa	Loan	2022
24	Sean Maguire	(Republic of Ireland) (England)	CF/SS/RW	1 May 1994 (age 32)	157	24	2017	(Republic of Ireland) Cork City	Undisclosed	2023
27	Jacob Holland-Wilkinson	(England)	CF	30 October 2002 (age 24)	0	0	2021	Academy	Trainee	2022
29	Tom Barkhuizen	(England)	RW/LW/CF	4 July 1993 (age 33)	206	38	2017	(England) Morecambe	Free	2022
31	Scott Sinclair	(England)	LW/SS/AM	25 March 1989 (age 37)	82	14	2020	(Scotland) Celtic	Undisclosed	2022
33	Ethan Walker	(England)	LW/CF/RW	28 July 2002 (age 24)	1	0	2018	Academy	Trainee	2022
38	Joe Rodwell-Grant	(England)	CF	18 October 2002 (age 24)	2	0	2021	Academy	Trainee	2022
Out on loan:
7	Tom Bayliss	(England)	CM/DM/RM	6 April 1999 (age 27)	21	1	2019	(England) Coventry City	£2,000,000	2023
10	Josh Harrop	(England)	AM/LM	15 December 1995 (age 30)	93	13	2017	(England) Manchester United	Undisclosed	2023
14	Jordan Storey	(England)	CB	22 September 1997 (age 29)	96	2	2018	(England) Exeter City	Undisclosed	2022
40	Jamie Thomas	(Wales) (England)	CF	10 January 1997 (age 29)	1	0	2021	(England) Bamber Bridge	Undisclosed	

- All appearances and goals up to date as of 7 May 2022.

== Statistics ==
As of 7 May 2022
Players with names in italics and marked * were on loan from another club for the whole of their season with Preston North End.

No.	Pos	Nat	Player	Total		Championship		FA Cup		League Cup	
No.	Pos	Nat	Player	Apps	Goals	Apps	Goals	Apps	Goals	Apps	Goals
2	DF	(Netherlands) NED	Sepp van den Berg*	49	2	42+2	1	1+0	0	3+1	1
3	DF	(Republic of Ireland) IRL	Greg Cunningham	25	0	16+4	0	1+0	0	4+0	0
4	MF	(England) ENG	Ben Whiteman	47	4	41+2	4	0+1	0	2+1	0
5	DF	(Germany) GER	Patrick Bauer	36	3	33+0	3	1+0	0	1+1	0
6	DF	(Scotland) SCO	Liam Lindsay	16	0	12+2	0	0+0	0	2+0	0
8	MF	(Republic of Ireland) IRL	Alan Browne	41	3	35+4	3	0+1	0	0+1	0
9	FW	(Wales) WAL	Ched Evans	22	2	12+9	2	0+1	0	0+0	0
11	MF	(Jamaica) JAM	Daniel Johnson	45	8	34+7	7	1+0	1	2+1	0
12	GK	(Denmark) DEN	Daniel Iversen*	48	0	45+1	0	1+0	0	1+0	0
13	MF	(Northern Ireland) NIR	Ali McCann	31	1	16+12	1	1+0	0	2+0	0
15	DF	(Republic of Ireland) IRL	Joe Rafferty	7	1	1+3	0	0+0	0	3+0	1
16	DF	(Wales) WAL	Andrew Hughes	43	2	39+0	1	0+0	0	4+0	1
18	MF	(England) ENG	Ryan Ledson	28	1	16+9	0	1+0	0	2+0	1
19	FW	(Denmark) DEN	Emil Riis Jakobsen	48	18	38+5	14	1+0	0	2+2	4
21	FW	(England) ENG	Cameron Archer*	20	7	18+2	7	0+0	0	0+0	0
22	DF	(United States) USA	Matthew Olosunde	1	0	1+0	0	0+0	0	0+0	0
23	DF	(England) ENG	Paul Huntington	1	0	0+1	0	0+0	0	0+0	0
24	FW	(Republic of Ireland) IRL	Sean Maguire	27	2	13+10	1	1+0	0	2+1	1
29	FW	(England) ENG	Tom Barkhuizen	13	0	9+3	0	0+0	0	1+0	0
31	FW	(England) ENG	Scott Sinclair	26	2	6+16	0	0+1	0	2+1	2
32	DF	(England) ENG	Josh Earl	30	1	23+5	1	1+0	0	0+1	0
39	MF	(England) ENG	Mikey O'Neill	3	0	0+3	0	0+0	0	0+0	0
41	DF	(Senegal) SEN	Bambo Diaby	7	0	5+2	0	0+0	0	0+0	0
44	MF	(England) ENG	Brad Potts	39	1	22+12	1	1+0	0	4+0	0
45	MF	(England) ENG	Josh Murphy*	12	0	0+12	0	0+0	0	0+0	0
Players out on loan:
7	MF	(England) ENG	Tom Bayliss	1	0	0+0	0	0+0	0	0+1	0
10	MF	(England) ENG	Josh Harrop	1	0	0+0	0	0+1	0	0+0	0
14	DF	(England) ENG	Jordan Storey	20	0	15+2	0	0+0	0	3+0	0
38	FW	(England) ENG	Joe Rodwell-Grant	2	0	0+1	0	0+0	0	0+1	0
40	FW	(Wales) WAL	Jamie Thomas	1	0	0+0	0	0+0	0	0+1	0
Players who left the club:
1	GK	(England) ENG	Declan Rudd	4	0	1+0	0	0+0	0	3+0	0
21	FW	(England) ENG	Connor Wickham	2	0	0+1	0	0+0	0	1+0	0

=== Goals record ===
As of 7 May 2022

Rank	No.	Nat.	Po.	Name	Championship	FA Cup	League Cup	Total
1	19	(Denmark)	CF	Emil Riis Jakobsen	16	0	4	20
2	11	(Jamaica)	CM	Daniel Johnson	7	1	0	8
3	21	(England)	CF	Cameron Archer	7	0	0	7
4	4	(England)	CM	Ben Whiteman	4	0	0	4
4	8	(Republic of Ireland)	CM	Alan Browne	4	0	0	4
6	5	(Germany)	CB	Patrick Bauer	3	0	0	3
7	2	(Netherlands)	CB	Sepp van den Berg	1	0	1	2
7	9	(Wales)	CF	Ched Evans	2	0	0	2
7	16	(Wales)	LB	Andrew Hughes	1	0	1	2
7	24	(Republic of Ireland)	CF	Sean Maguire	1	0	1	2
7	31	(England)	RW	Scott Sinclair	0	0	2	2
12	13	(Northern Ireland)	CM	Ali McCann	1	0	0	1
12	15	(Republic of Ireland)	RB	Joe Rafferty	0	0	1	1
12	18	(England)	CM	Ryan Ledson	0	0	1	1
12	32	(England)	LB	Josh Earl	1	0	0	1
12	44	(England)	CM	Brad Potts	1	0	0	1
Own Goals					2	0	0	2
Total					53	1	11	65

=== Disciplinary record ===
As of 7 May 2022

Rank	No.	Nat.	Po.	Name	Championship			FA Cup			League Cup			Total		
Rank	No.	Nat.	Po.	Name	Yellow card	(yellow card) (yellow-red card)	Red card	Yellow card	(yellow card) (yellow-red card)	Red card	Yellow card	(yellow card) (yellow-red card)	Red card	Yellow card	(yellow card) (yellow-red card)	Red card
1	4	(England)	CM	Ben Whiteman	13	0	0	0	0	0	0	0	0	13	0	0
2	11	(Jamaica)	AM	Daniel Johnson	9	0	0	0	0	0	0	0	0	9	0	0
2	16	(Wales)	LB	Andrew Hughes	7	0	1	0	0	0	1	0	0	8	0	1
4	2	(Netherlands)	CB	Sepp van den Berg	7	0	0	0	0	0	1	0	0	8	0	0
5	8	(Republic of Ireland)	CM	Alan Browne	5	1	0	0	0	0	0	0	0	5	1	0
6	18	(England)	CM	Ryan Ledson	5	0	0	0	0	0	1	0	0	6	0	0
7	9	(Wales)	CF	Ched Evans	5	0	0	0	0	0	0	0	0	5	0	0
8	6	(Scotland)	CB	Liam Lindsay	1	2	0	0	0	0	0	0	0	1	2	0
8	19	(Denmark)	CF	Emil Riis Jakobsen	4	0	0	0	0	0	0	0	0	4	0	0
8	44	(England)	CM	Brad Potts	4	0	0	0	0	0	0	0	0	4	0	0
11	3	(Republic of Ireland)	LB	Greg Cunningham	3	0	0	0	0	0	0	0	0	3	0	0
11	5	(Germany)	CB	Patrick Bauer	2	0	0	0	0	0	1	0	0	3	0	0
11	13	(Northern Ireland)	CM	Ali McCann	3	0	0	0	0	0	0	0	0	3	0	0
11	14	(England)	CB	Jordan Storey	3	0	0	0	0	0	0	0	0	3	0	0
11	32	(England)	LB	Josh Earl	3	0	0	0	0	0	0	0	0	3	0	0
16	5	(Germany)	CB	Patrick Bauer	2	0	0	0	0	0	0	0	0	2	0	0
16	24	(Republic of Ireland)	CF	Sean Maguire	2	0	0	0	0	0	0	0	0	2	0	0
16	29	(England)	RW	Tom Barkhuizen	2	0	0	0	0	0	0	0	0	2	0	0
16	31	(England)	RW	Scott Sinclair	2	0	0	0	0	0	0	0	0	2	0	0
20	1	(England)	GK	Declan Rudd	0	0	0	0	0	0	1	0	0	1	0	0
20	12	(Denmark)	GK	Daniel Iversen	1	0	0	0	0	0	0	0	0	1	0	0
20	21	(England)	CF	Cameron Archer	1	0	0	0	0	0	0	0	0	1	0	0
Total					83	2	2	0	0	0	5	0	0	87	2	2

=== Contracts ===
Date	Position	Nationality	Name	Signed	Contract Length	Expiry Date	Ref.
1 July 2021	LB	(Scotland)	Lewis Coulston	Signed	1 Year	June 2022	
1 July 2021	CF	(England)	Jacob Holland-Wilkinson	Signed	1 Year	June 2022	
1 July 2021	GK	(England)	Oliver Lombard	Signed	1 Year	June 2022	
1 July 2021	CF	(England)	Joe Rodwell-Grant	Signed	1 Year	June 2022	

== Transfers ==
=== Transfers in ===
Date	Position	Nationality	Name	From	Fee	Ref.
9 June 2021	CB	(Scotland)	Liam Lindsay	(England) Stoke City	Undisclosed	
1 July 2021	SS	(England)	Izzy Brown	(England) Chelsea	Free transfer	
1 July 2021	RB	(United States)	Matthew Olosunde	(England) Rotherham United	Free transfer	
5 August 2021	CF	(Wales)	Jamie Thomas	(England) Bamber Bridge	Free transfer	
31 August 2021	CM	(Northern Ireland)	Ali McCann	(Scotland) St Johnstone	Undisclosed	
13 September 2021	CF	(England)	Connor Wickham	(England) Crystal Palace	Free transfer	
31 January 2022	CB	(Spain)	Bambo Diaby	Free agent	—N/a	

=== Loans in ===
Date from	Position	Nationality	Name	From	Date until	Ref.
1 July 2021	CB	(Netherlands)	Sepp van den Berg	(England) Liverpool	End of season	
4 August 2021	GK	(Denmark)	Daniel Iversen	(England) Leicester City	End of season	
31 August 2021	LW	(England)	Josh Murphy	(Wales) Cardiff City	End of season	
24 January 2022	CF	(England)	Cameron Archer	(England) Aston Villa	End of season	

=== Loans out ===
Date from	Position	Nationality	Name	To	Date until	Ref.
21 August 2021	CF	(England)	Jacob Holland-Wilkinson	(England) AFC Fylde	18 September 2021	
27 August 2021	CM	(England)	Tom Bayliss	(England) Wigan Athletic	End of season	
8 September 2021	GK	(England)	Oliver Lombard	(England) Kendal Town	10 October 2021	
17 September 2021	LW	(England)	Ethan Walker	(England) AFC Fylde	October 2021	
21 September 2021	CF	(England)	Jacob Holland-Wilkinson	(England) Lancaster City		
8 October 2021	DM	(England)	Jack Baxter	(England) Radcliffe	13 November 2021	
16 October 2021	GK	(England)	Connor Ripley	(England) Salford City	23 October 2021	
22 October 2021	CF	(England)	Joe Rodwell-Grant	(England) Bamber Bridge	1 January 2022	(Note: On 1 December, Rodwell-Grant's loan at Bamber Bridge was extended.)
2 November 2021	LB	(Scotland)	Lewis Coulton	(England) Bamber Bridge	4 December 2021	
19 November 2021	CM	(Republic of Ireland)	Adam O'Reilly	(England) Stalybridge Celtic	1 January 2022	
19 November 2021	LW	(England)	Ethan Walker	(England) AFC Fylde	1 January 2022	
19 January 2022	CB	(England)	Jordan Storey	(England) Sheffield Wednesday	End of season	
20 January 2022	CM	(Republic of Ireland)	Adam O'Reilly	(Republic of Ireland) St Patrick's Athletic	31 July 2022	
21 January 2022	LB	(Scotland)	Lewis Coulton	(England) Warrington Town	23 April 2022 (Note: On 24 February, Coulton's loan at Warrington Town was extended until April.)	
21 January 2022	CF	(England)	Jacob Holland-Wilkinson	(England) Bamber Bridge	February 2022	
25 January 2022	CF	(Wales)	Jamie Thomas	(England) FC Halifax Town	End of season	
27 January 2022	AM	(England)	Josh Harrop	(England) Fleetwood Town	End of season	
28 January 2022	CF	(England)	Joe Rodwell-Grant	(England) Lancaster City	March 2022	
25 February 2022	GK	(England)	Mathew Hudson	(England) Bamber Bridge	End of season	
11 March 2022	CB	(England)	Joe Blanchard	(England) Lancaster City	Work experience	
22 March 2022	CB	(England)	Teddy Mfuni	(England) Witton Albion	End of season	

=== Transfers out ===
Date	Position	Nationality	Name	To	Fee	Ref.
10 May 2021	CM	(Scotland)	Paul Gallagher	Retired		
15 June 2021	CF	(England)	Jayden Stockley	(England) Charlton Athletic	Undisclosed	
30 June 2021	LW	(Wales)	Billy Bodin	(England) Oxford United	Released	
30 June 2021	CF	(Republic of Ireland)	Graham Burke	(Republic of Ireland) Shamrock Rovers	Released	
30 June 2021	CM	(England)	Ben Dooley	(England) Atherton Laburnum Rovers	Released	
30 June 2021	RW	(England)	Josh Ginnelly	(Scotland) Heart of Midlothian	Released	
30 June 2021	RB	(England)	Harry Huddart	(Wales) Swansea University	Released	
30 June 2021	CF	(England)	Louis Moult	(England) Burton Albion	Released	
30 June 2021	CF	(England)	David Nugent		Released	
30 June 2021	RB	(England)	Kyi Nicholson		Released	
12 July 2021	CB	(England)	Lewis Earl	(England) Stockport County	Free transfer	
13 January 2022	CF	(England)	Connor Wickham	(England) Milton Keynes Dons	Contract expiry	
31 March 2022	GK	(England)	Declan Rudd	Retired		

== Pre-season friendlies ==
Preston North End announced they would play friendlies against Bamber Bridge, St Johnstone, Celtic, Bolton Wanderers, Accrington Stanley, Manchester City, Wigan Athletic and Manchester United as part of their pre-season preparations.

10 July 2021 Friendly	Bamber Bridge	3–8	Preston North End	Chorley
15:00 BST	Thomas 44', 62'; Yeates 86'	Report	Leigh 16'; Potts 36'; Barkhuizen 37'; Mawene 39'; Harrop 53', 83'; Maguire 60'; Riis 90+1'	Stadium: Euxton Training Ground; Attendance: 0 (Behind-closed-doors)

13 July 2021 Friendly	St Johnstone	1–1	Preston North End	Tulloch, Scotland
19:00 BST	Wotherspoon 50'	Report	Whiteman 35'	Stadium: McDiarmid Park

17 July 2021 Friendly	Celtic	0–1	Preston North End	Parkhead, Scotland
17:30 BST		Report	Whiteman 64' (pen.)	Stadium: Celtic Park

20 July 2021 Friendly	Preston North End	0–1	Bolton Wanderers	Leyland
19:00 BST		Report	Jones 51'	Stadium: County Ground; Attendance: 1,100+

24 July 2021 Friendly	Accrington Stanley	1–1	Preston North End	Accrington
15:00 BST	Pritchard 67'	Report	Thomas 55'	Stadium: Wham Stadium

27 July 2021 Friendly	Manchester City	2–0	Preston North End	Manchester
19:00 BST	Mahrez 25'; Edozie 64'	Report		Stadium: Academy Stadium; Attendance: 0 (Behind-closed-doors)

30 July 2021 Friendly	Wigan Athletic	3–2	Preston North End	Wigan
19:30 BST	Keane 26'; Humphrys 54'; Lang 69'	Report	Darikwa 48' (o.g.); Rodwell-Grant 87'	Stadium: DW Stadium

31 July 2021 Friendly	Preston North End	Cancelled	Manchester United	Preston
14:00 BST				Stadium: Deepdale
Note: Match was cancelled due to a number of suspected COVID-19 cases in the United squad.

== Competitions ==
=== Overview ===
Competition	First match	Last match	Starting round	Record							
Competition	First match	Last match	Starting round	Pld	W	D	L	GF	GA	GD	Win %
EFL Championship	12 September 2020	May 2021	Matchday 1	0	0	0	0	0	0	+0	—
FA Cup	9 January 2021	9 January 2021	Third round	0	0	0	0	0	0	+0	—
EFL Cup	5 September 2021	5 September 2020	First round	0	0	0	0	0	0	+0	—
Lancashire Senior Cup	12 October 2021		First round	0	0	0	0	0	0	+0	—
Total				0	0	0	0	0	0	+0	—

Last updated: 24 April 2021
Source: Competitions

=== EFL Championship ===
==== League table ====
Pos	Team	Pld	W	D	L	GF	GA	GD	Pts
10	West Bromwich Albion	46	18	13	15	52	45	+7	67
11	Queens Park Rangers	46	19	9	18	60	59	+1	66
12	Coventry City	46	17	13	16	60	59	+1	64
13	Preston North End	46	16	16	14	52	56	−4	64
14	Stoke City	46	17	11	18	57	52	+5	62
15	Swansea City	46	16	13	17	58	68	−10	61
16	Blackpool	46	16	12	18	54	58	−4	60

Source: EFL Official Website
Rules for classification: 1) Points; 2) Goal difference; 3) Number of goals scored; 4) Head-to-head results; 5) Wins; 6) Away goals; 7) Penalty points (sec 9.5); 8) 12-point sending off offences

==== Results summary ====
Overall								Home						Away					
Pld	W	D	L	GF	GA	GD	Pts	W	D	L	GF	GA	GD	W	D	L	GF	GA	GD
46	16	16	14	52	56	−4	64	9	10	4	33	28	+5	7	6	10	19	28	−9

Last updated: 7 May 2022.

==== Results by matchday ====
Matchday	1	2	3	4	5	6	7	8	9	10	11	12	13	14	15	16	17	18	19	20	21	22	23	24	25	26	27	28	29	30	31	32	33	34	35	36	37	38	39	40	41	42	43	44	45	46
H/A	H	A	A	H	H	A	A	H	A	H	A	H	H	A	H	A	A	H	A	H	A	H	A	H	H	A	A	H	A	A	H	A	H	H	A	H	A	A	A	H	H	H	A	H	A	H
Result	L	L	L	W	W	D	D	D	D	D	L	D	W	L	W	W	L	L	W	D	L	W	W	D	D	L	W	D	D	W	D	W	L	D	D	W	D	L	L	W	W	D	L	L	W	W
Position	23	24	24	20	16	13	14	17	15	17	18	18	18	19	19	15	17	16	14	16	18	14	14	15	13	15	13	13	14	11	12	11	12	11	12	12	13	14	15	14	12	13	15	15	14	13

Updated to match(es) played on 7 May 2022. Source:
A = Away; H = Home; W = Win; D = Draw; L = Loss

==== Matches ====
PNE's fixtures were announced on 24 June 2021.

7 August 2021 1	Preston North End	1–4	Hull City	Preston
15:00 BST	Riis Jakobsen 8'; Barkhuizen (yellow card) 45+5'; Ledson (yellow card) 65'	Report	Lewis-Potter 35', (yellow card) 75'; Smallwood 62'; Magennis 85'; Eaves (yellow card) 90+1'; Cannon 90+2'	Stadium: Deepdale; Attendance: 12,452; Referee: Gavin Ward

14 August 2021 2	Reading	2–1	Preston North End	Reading
15:00 BST (UTC+1)	Azeez 28'; Morrison (yellow card) 59'; Bristow (yellow card) 66'; Swift 69'; Laurent (yellow card) 90+6'	Report	Johnson 61' (pen.)	Stadium: Select Car Leasing Stadium; Referee: Josh Smith

17 August 2021 3	Huddersfield Town	1–0	Preston North End	Huddersfield
19:45 BST	Campbell (yellow card) 56'; Sarr (yellow card) 68' van den Berg 74' (o.g.)	Report	Lindsay (yellow card) 41'; Whiteman (yellow card) 64'	Stadium: John Smith's Stadium; Referee: James Linington
Note: Live on Sky Sports

21 August 2021 4	Preston North End	1–0	Peterborough United	Preston
15:00 BST	Bauer 14'; Whiteman (yellow card) 51'; Ledson (yellow card) 84'	Report		Stadium: Deepdale; Attendance: 9,952; Referee: Dean Whitestone

28 August 2021 5	Preston North End	3–1	Swansea City	Preston
15:00 BST	van den Berg 21'; Riis Jakobsen 45+2'; Whiteman 52', (yellow card) 71'; Ledson (yellow card) 59'; Johnson (yellow card) 61'; Sinclair (yellow card) 85'	Report	Piroe 19'; Benda (yellow card) 51'	Stadium: Deepdale; Attendance: 10,180; Referee: Thomas Bramall

11 September 2021 6	Bristol City	0–0	Preston North End	Ashton Gate
15:00 GMT		Report	Whiteman (yellow card) 55'	Stadium: Ashton Gate; Attendance: 17,967; Referee: Tim Robinson

14 September 2021 7	Sheffield United	2–2	Preston North End	Sheffield
19:45 BST	Gibbs-White 7'; Norwood (yellow card) 45+2'; Norrington-Davies (yellow card) 74'; Berge 84'	Report	Riis Jakobsen (yellow card) 13', (goal) 90+5'; Johnson 19'	Stadium: Bramall Lane; Referee: Geoff Eltringham

18 September 2021 8	Preston North End	1–1	West Bromwich Albion	Preston
15:00 BST	van den Berg (yellow card) 4'; Whiteman 26'	Report	Phillips 45+2'; Bartley (yellow card) 76'	Stadium: Deepdale; Attendance: 13,850; Referee: Andy Davies

25 September 2021 9	Birmingham City	0–0	Preston North End	Birmingham
15:00 BST	Bela (yellow card) 45+1'	Report	Bauer (yellow card) 39'; Storey (yellow card) 62'; Ledson (yellow card) 73'	Stadium: St Andrew's; Referee: Matt Donohue

28 September 2021 10	Preston North End	1–1	Stoke City	Preston
19:45 BST	Cunningham (yellow card) 31'; Whiteman 38'; Riis Jakobsen (yellow card) 88'	Report	Powell 6'; Østigård (yellow card) 25'; Wilmot (yellow card) 83'; Tymon (yellow card) 90'; Clucas (yellow card) 90+3'	Stadium: Deepdale; Attendance: 10,930; Referee: John Brooks

2 October 2021 11	Queens Park Rangers	3–2	Preston North End	Shepherd's Bush, London
15:00 BST	Dykes 17'; Dunne 71'; Chair 74'; Amos (yellow card) 90+5'	Report	Riis Jakobsen 27'; Earl 46'	Stadium: Kiyan Prince Foundation Stadium; Referee: Jeremy Simpson

16 October 2021 12	Preston North End	0–0	Derby County	Preston
15:00 BST	Johnson (yellow card) 5'; Storey (yellow card) 62'	Report		Stadium: Deepdale; Attendance: 18,092; Referee: Josh Smith

20 October 2021 13	Preston North End	2–1	Coventry City	Preston
19:45 BST	Hughes (yellow card) 23'; Bauer (yellow card) 50', (goal) 61'; Riis Jakobsen 69'	Report	Walker 45'; Kelly (yellow card) 51'	Stadium: Deepdale; Attendance: 10,837; Referee: Darren England

23 October 2021 14	Blackpool	2–0	Preston North End	Blackpool
15:00 BST	Anderson 27', (yellow card) 90+7'; Madine 68'; Grimshaw (yellow card) 88'; Carey (yellow card) 90+4'; Husband (yellow card) 90+8'	Report	Sinclair (yellow card) 31'; Bauer (yellow card) 39'; Browne (yellow card) 45+3' (yellow-red card) 90+7'; Potts (yellow card) 84'; Maguire (yellow card) 90+8'	Stadium: Bloomfield Road; Attendance: 13,946; Referee: Tim Robinson

30 October 2021 15	Preston North End	2–0	Luton Town	Preston
15:00 BST	Riis Jakobsen 27', 45+3' (pen.); Browne (yellow card) 38'	Report	Bell (yellow card) 24'; Lockyer (yellow card) 37'	Stadium: Deepdale; Attendance: 11,059; Referee: Dean Whitestone

2 November 2021 16	Bournemouth	1–2	Preston North End	Kings Park
19:45 GMT	Lerma (yellow card) 58'; Billing 60', (yellow card) 83'; Mepham (yellow card) 62'	Report	Whiteman 52'; McCann 78'; Barkhuizen (yellow card) 84'	Stadium: Vitality Stadium; Referee: David Webb

6 November 2021 17	Nottingham Forest	3–0	Preston North End	West Bridgford
15:00 GMT	Grabban 32' (pen.), (yellow card) 50', (goal) 70'; Colback 41'; Taylor (yellow card) 90+3'	Report	Hughes (yellow card) 26'; McCann (yellow card) 43'; Storey (yellow card) 52'	Stadium: The City Ground; Attendance: 27,129; Referee: Simon Hooper

20 November 2021 18	Preston North End	1–2	Cardiff City	Preston
15:00 GMT	Maguire 2'; Cunningham (yellow card) 56'; Iversen (yellow card) 66'	Report	Ng (yellow card) 35'; McGuinness 51'; Collins 66'; Colwill (yellow card) 87'; Harris (yellow card) 88'	Stadium: Deepdale; Attendance: 10,749; Referee: Leigh Doughty

23 November 2021 19	Middlesbrough	1–2	Preston North End	Middlesbrough
19:45 GMT	McNair 33'	Report	Browne (yellow card) 63'; Evans (yellow card) 75', (goal) 77'; Riis Jakobsen 81'; Earl (yellow card) 85'; Johnson (yellow card) 90+2'	Stadium: Riverside Stadium; Attendance: 18,013; Referee: Andy Woolmer

27 November 2021 20	Preston North End	1–1	Fulham	Preston
12:30 GMT	van den Berg (yellow card) 26'; Evans 72'	Report	Ream 15'; Robinson (yellow card) 48'; Onomah (yellow card) 80'	Stadium: Deepdale; Attendance: 9,838; Referee: Chris Kavanagh

4 December 2021 21	Blackburn Rovers	1–0	Preston North End	Blackburn
15:00 GMT	Lenihan (yellow card) 15'; Brereton 53' van Hecke (yellow card) 65'; Travis (yellow card) 68'	Report	Riis Jakobsen (yellow card) 65'; Evans (yellow card) 83'	Stadium: Ewood Park; Attendance: 18,487; Referee: Gavin Ward

11 December 2021 22	Preston North End	2–1	Barnsley	Preston
15:00 GMT	Browne 57'; Johnson 78'	Report	Woodrow (yellow card) 27', (goal) 65'; Andersen (yellow card) 77'	Stadium: Deepdale; Attendance: 11,106; Referee: Keith Stroud

3 January 2022 23	Stoke City	1–2	Preston North End	Stoke-on-Trent
15:00 GMT	Wilmot 46'; Allen (yellow card) 64'; Doughty (yellow card) 79'; Ince (yellow card) 90+4'	Report	Hughes (yellow card) 49', (goal) 81'; Potts 59'; Ledson (yellow card) 90+1'	Stadium: Bet365 Stadium; Attendance: 20,002; Referee: Jeremy Simpson

15 January 2022 24	Preston North End	1–1	Birmingham City	Preston
15:00 GMT	Bauer 31'; Whiteman (yellow card) 72'	Report	Mengi (yellow card) 56'; Hogan 86'	Stadium: Deepdale; Attendance: 12,821; Referee: Andy Davies

18 January 2022 25	Preston North End	2–2	Sheffield United	Preston
19:45 GMT	Hughes (red card) 38'; Browne 71'; Cunningham (yellow card) 82'; Riis 89'	Report	Bogle 17', (yellow card) 80'; Sharp 39' (pen.); Hourihane (yellow card) 60'	Stadium: Deepdale; Attendance: 12,954; Referee: David Webb

22 January 2022 26	Swansea City	1–0	Preston North End	Landore
15:00 GMT	Manning (yellow card) 12', (goal) 51'; Latibeaudiere (yellow card) 87'; Smith (yellow card) 88'	Report	Cunningham (yellow card) 64'; Evans (yellow card) 87'; Bauer (yellow card) 90+1'	Stadium: Swansea.com Stadium; Attendance: 16,842; Referee: Josh Smith

26 January 2022 27	West Bromwich Albion	0–2	Preston North End	West Bromwich
20:00 GMT	Furlong (yellow card) 49'; Townsend (yellow card) 78'	Report	Riis Jakobsen 41', (yellow card) 52'; Whiteman (yellow card) 48'; Evans (yellow card) 69'; Archer 76'; Maguire (yellow card) 90+5'	Stadium: The Hawthorns; Attendance: 20,776; Referee: Keith Stroud

29 January 2022 28	Preston North End	2–2	Bristol City	Preston
15:00 GMT	Riis Jakobsen 52', 90+5'	Report	Martin 12'; Semenyo 81'	Stadium: Deepdale; Attendance: 11,936; Referee: John Busby

1 February 2022 29	Millwall	0–0	Preston North End	Bermondsey
19:45 GMT	Bennett (yellow card) 60'; Hutchinson (yellow card) 63'; Burey (yellow card) 83'	Report	van den Berg (yellow card) 17'; Whiteman (penalty missed) 63'	Stadium: The Den; Attendance: 10,183; Referee: Kevin Friend

5 February 2022 30	Hull City	0–1	Preston North End	Kingston upon Hull
15:00 GMT		Report	Archer 51', (yellow card) 85'; Johnson (yellow card) 79'	Stadium: MKM Stadium; Attendance: 14,273; Referee: Darren Bond

9 February 2022 31	Preston North End	0–0	Huddersfield Town	Preston
19:45 GMT	Potts (yellow card) 72'	Report	Holmes (yellow card) 80'; O'Brien (yellow card) 89'	Stadium: Deepdale; Attendance: 11,120; Referee: Robert Jones

12 February 2022 32	Peterborough United	0–1	Preston North End	Peterborough
15:00 GMT		Report	Bauer (yellow card) 28' van den Berg (yellow card) 73'; Archer 80'	Stadium: Weston Homes Stadium; Attendance: 9,072; Referee: Tim Robinson

19 February 2022 33	Preston North End	2–3	Reading	Preston
15:00 GMT	Johnson 57'; Archer 74' van den Berg (yellow card) 90+5'	Report	João 2', 19'; Swift 55'	Stadium: Deepdale; Attendance: 12,817; Referee: John Busby

22 February 2022 34	Preston North End	0–0	Nottingham Forest	Preston
19:45 GMT	Johnson (yellow card) 45+1'; Earl (yellow card) 77'; Whiteman (yellow card) 90+1'	Report	Colback (yellow card) 60'; McKenna (yellow card) 73'	Stadium: Deepdale; Attendance: 12,598; Referee: Geoff Eltringham

26 February 2022 35	Coventry City	1–1	Preston North End	Coventry
15:00 GMT	Rose (yellow card) 32'; Hamer (yellow card) 69'; Dabo (red card) 86'; Tavares 90+8'	Report	Earl (yellow card) 14'; Lindsay (yellow card) 17' (yellow-red card) 84'; Whiteman (yellow card) 74'; Johnson 89' (pen.); Evans (yellow card) 90+2'	Stadium: Coventry Building Society Arena; Attendance: 19,743; Referee: Keith Stroud

5 March 2022 36	Preston North End	2–1	Bournemouth	Preston
15:00 GMT	Potts (yellow card) 24'; Archer 54' van den Berg (yellow card) 58'; Johnson (yellow card) 82'; Riis Jakobsen 89'; Browne (yellow card) 90'	Report	Lowe 50'; Billing (yellow card) 90+8'	Stadium: Deepdale; Attendance: 12,173; Referee: Matt Donohue

12 March 2022 37	Cardiff City	0–0	Preston North End	Leckwith
15:00 GMT	Hugill (yellow card) 68'; Ralls (yellow card) 71'	Report	Hughes (yellow card) 51'; Potts (yellow card) 90+3'	Stadium: Cardiff City Stadium; Attendance: 19,743; Referee: James Linington

16 March 2022 38	Luton Town	4–0	Preston North End	Luton
19:45 GMT	Berry 9', 42'; Onyedinma 28'; Diaby 59' (o.g.); Campbell (yellow card) 87'	Report	Hughes (yellow card) 27'; Whiteman (yellow card) 75'	Stadium: Kenilworth Stadium; Attendance: 9,408; Referee: Steve Martin

2 April 2022 39	Derby County	1–0	Preston North End	Derby
15:00 BST	Bird (red card) 55'; Davies (yellow card) 66'; Morrison 80'; Knight (yellow card) 84'	Report	Lindsay (red card) 32'; Whiteman (yellow card) 61'; Johnson (yellow card) 87'	Stadium: Pride Park Stadium; Attendance: 23,600; Referee: Geoff Eltringham

5 April 2022 40	Preston North End	1–0	Blackpool	Preston
19:45 BST	Archer 45+3'; Whiteman (yellow card) 45+1'; Johnson (yellow card) 62'; Hughes (yellow card) 64'; McCann (yellow card) 90+2'	Report		Stadium: Deepdale; Referee: David Webb

9 April 2022 41	Preston North End	2–1	Queens Park Rangers	Preston
15:00 BST	Dunne 42' (o.g.); Archer 50'	Report	Field (yellow card) 85'; Gray 90+3' (pen.)	Stadium: Deepdale; Attendance: 10,873; Referee: Tony Harrington

15 April 2022 42	Preston North End	1–1	Millwall	Preston
15:00 BST	Wallace 6' (o.g.)	Report	Wallace 22'; Kieftenbeld (yellow card) 31'	Stadium: Deepdale; Attendance: 11,979; Referee: Thomas Bramall

19 April 2022 43	Fulham	3–0	Preston North End	Fulham
19:45 BST	Mitrović 9', 41'; Cairney (yellow card) 20'; Carvalho 34'	Report	Whiteman (yellow card) 45+1'	Stadium: Craven Cottage; Referee: Leigh Doughty

25 April 2022 44	Preston North End	1–4	Blackburn Rovers	Preston
19:45 BST	Browne 29', (yellow card) 38'; Whiteman (yellow card) 62'	Report	Pickering (yellow card) 1'; Gallagher 9', (yellow card) 21'; Buckley 12', (yellow card) 63'; Lenihan 37'; Travis 52'	Stadium: Deepdale; Referee: Jeremy Simpson

30 April 2022 45	Barnsley	1–3	Preston North End	Barnsley
12:30 BST	Marsh 17'	Report	Johnson 23', 54'; Riis Jakobsen 74'	Stadium: Oakwell Stadium; Referee: David Webb

7 May 2022 46	Preston North End	4–1	Middlesbrough	Preston
12:30 BST	Browne 24'; Fry 35' (o.g.), (yellow card) 66'; Johnson (yellow card) 45' van den Berg (yellow card) 45'; Riis Jakobsen 53', 74' (pen.); McCann (yellow card) 56'	Report	McNair (yellow card) 45' (yellow-red card) 73'; Daniels (yellow card) 45'; Tavernier 48'; Dijksteel (yellow card) 58'; Jones (yellow card) 72'; Crooks (yellow card) 84'	Stadium: Deepdale; Attendance: 17,691; Referee: Tim Robinson

=== FA Cup ===
PNE were drawn away to Cardiff City in the third round.

9 January 2022 Third round	Cardiff City	2–1 (a.e.t.)	Preston North End	Leckwith
14:00 GMT	Davies 42'; Ng (yellow card) 63'; Harris 116'	Report	Johnson 53' (pen.); Browne (yellow card) 113'	Stadium: Cardiff City Stadium; Attendance: 0 (Behind-closed-doors); Referee: Simon Hooper

=== EFL Cup ===
Preston North End were drawn away to Mansfield Town and Morecambe in the first and second round respectively, then at home against Cheltenham Town and Liverpool in the third and fourth round.

10 August 2021 First round	Mansfield Town	0–3	Preston North End	Mansfield
19:45 BST		Report	Sinclair 45+1', 81'; Riis Jakobsen 71'; Bauer (yellow card) 78'	Stadium: One Call Stadium; Attendance: 2,526; Referee: Ross Joyce

24 August 2021 Second round	Morecambe	2–4	Preston North End	Morecambe
19:45 BST	Duffus (yellow card) 39'; O'Connor 45+4'; Stockton 61'	Report	Riis Jakobsen 7', 33'; Hughes (yellow card) 45+3'; Ledson (yellow card) 54', (goal) 64' van den Berg 79', (yellow card) 90'	Stadium: Mazuma Stadium; Attendance: 4,334; Referee: James Oldham

21 September 2021 Third round	Preston North End	4–1	Cheltenham Town	Preston
19:45 BST	Hughes 25'; Rafferty 37'; Maguire 82'; Rudd (yellow card) 85'; Riis 90+3'	Report	Barkers (yellow card) 28'; Thomas (yellow card) 32'; Vassell 56', (yellow card) 90+2'	Stadium: Deepdale; Attendance: 6,561; Referee: Dean Whitestone

27 October 2021 Fourth round	Preston North End	0–2	Liverpool	Preston
19:45 BST		Report	Minamino 62'; Origi 84'	Stadium: Deepdale; Attendance: 22,131; Referee: David Coote

=== Lancashire Senior Cup ===
Preston North End were drawn away to Rochdale in the first round.

12 October 2021 First round	Rochdale	0–2	Preston North End	Spotland
14:00 BST		Report	Sinclair	Stadium: Crown Oil Arena
