= Joe Rodwell-Grant =

English footballer

Personal information
- Full name: Joseph Edward Rodwell-Grant
- Date of birth: 18 October 2002 (age 24)
- Place of birth: Haslingden, England
- Height: 1.88 m (6 ft 2 in)
- Position: Striker

Team information
- Current team: Curzon Ashton

Youth career
- 2013–2020: Preston North End

Senior career*
| Years | Team | Apps | (Gls) |
| 2020–2022 | Preston North End | 1 | (0) |
| 2020 | → Chorley (loan) | 4 | (0) |
| 2020 | → Bamber Bridge (loan) | 1 | (0) |
| 2021 | → Bamber Bridge (loan) | 4 | (1) |
| 2022 | → Lancaster City (loan) | 5 | (1) |
| 2022–2024 | Wigan Athletic | 0 | (0) |
| 2022 | → FC United of Manchester (loan) | 10 | (5) |
| 2024–2025 | Warrington Town | 39 | (2) |
| 2025– | Curzon Ashton | 17 | (2) |
| 2025- | Warrington Town (Loan) | | |
- * Club domestic league appearances and goals as of 13: 00, 24 May 2025 (UTC)

Joseph Edward Rodwell-Grant (born 18 October 2002) is an English professional footballer who plays as a striker for Northern Premier League Premier Division club Curzon Ashton. He also runs his own coaching business, where he trains youth players and professional players 1:2.

== Career ==
Rodwell-Grant was born in Haslingden, Lancashire and grew up in Rossendale with his mother. He joined the youth academy of Preston North End at the age of 11, after he was picked up playing junior football in East Lancashire. In 2020, he went on successive loans with non-league sides Chorley and Bamber Bridge. He signed his first professional contract with the club on 12 May 2021. He made his professional debut with Preston North End in a 3–0 EFL Cup win over Mansfield Town on 10 August 2021. He was released by the club at the end of the 2021–22 season.

On 29 July 2022, he signed a contract with Wigan Athletic after a successful trial period. In September 2022, he joined FC United of Manchester on loan before returning to the club in October.

In July 2024, Rodwell-Grant joined National League North side Warrington Town.

In May 2025, following Warrington Town's relegation, Rodwell-Grant remained in the National League North, joining Curzon Ashton.

== Career statistics ==
As of match played 23 April 2022

Appearances and goals by club, season and competition
| Club | Season | League | | | FA Cup | | League Cup | | Other | | Total | |
| Club | Season | Division | Apps | Goals | Apps | Goals | Apps | Goals | Apps | Goals | Apps | Goals |
|---|---|---|---|---|---|---|---|---|---|---|---|---|
| Preston North End | 2020–21 | Championship | 0 | 0 | — | | 0 | 0 | — | | 0 | 0 |
| Preston North End | 2021–22 | Championship | 1 | 0 | 0 | 0 | 1 | 0 | — | | 2 | 0 |
| Preston North End | Total | | 1 | 0 | 0 | 0 | 1 | 0 | — | | 2 | 0 |
| Chorley (loan) | 2020–21 | National League North | 4 | 0 | 2 | 0 | — | | — | | 6 | 0 |
| Bamber Bridge (loan) | 2020–21 | NPL Premier Division | 1 | 0 | — | | — | | 1 (Note: Appearances in FA Trophy) | 0 | 2 | 0 |
| Bamber Bridge (loan) | 2021–22 | NPL Premier Division | 7 | 1 | — | | — | | 1 | 0 | 8 | 1 |
| Lancaster City (loan) | 2021–22 | NPL Premier Division | 16 | 1 | — | | — | | — | | 16 | 1 |
| Wigan Athletic | 2022–23 | Championship | 0 | 0 | — | | — | | — | | 0 | 0 |
| Warrington Town | 2024-25 | Vanarama National League North | 39 | 2 | 1 0 | | 0 | 0 | | | | |
| Career total | | | 29 | 2 | 2 | 0 | 1 | 0 | 2 | 0 | 34 | 2 |

== Honours ==
Preston North End- (x1)

EFL Youth Alliance Cup 2022
