= 2020–21 Preston North End F.C. season =

English football club season

Preston North End
2020–21 season
- Manager: Alex Neil
- Stadium: Deepdale
- Championship: 13th
- FA Cup: Third round
- EFL Cup: Third round
- Top goalscorer: League: Scott Sinclair (9); All: Scott Sinclair (9)
Home colours	Away colours	Third colours

The 2020–21 Preston North End F.C. season was the club's 141st season in existence and their sixth consecutive season in the Championship. They also took part in the FA Cup and the EFL Cup. The season covers the period from July 2020 to 30 June 2021.

== Squad ==
As of 8 May 2021

Note: Flags indicate national team as has been defined under FIFA eligibility rules. Players may hold more than one non-FIFA nationality.

No.	Name	Nat.	Position(s)	Date of birth (age)	Apps.	Goals	Year signed	Signed from	Transfer fee	Ends
Goalkeepers
1	Declan Rudd	(England)	GK	16 January 1991 (age 35)	192	0	2017	(England) Norwich City	£966,000	2023
22	Daniel Iversen	(Denmark)	GK	19 July 1997 (age 29)	23	0	2021	(England) Leicester City	Loan	2021
25	Connor Ripley	(England)	GK	13 February 1993 (age 33)	10	0	2019	(England) Middlesbrough	Undisclosed	2022
Defenders
2	Sepp van den Berg	(Netherlands)	CB	20 December 2001 (age 24)	16	0	2021	(England) Liverpool	Loan	2021
5	Patrick Bauer	(Germany)	CB	28 October 1992 (age 34)	56	5	2019	(England) Charlton Athletic	Free	2022
6	Liam Lindsay	(Scotland) (England)	CB	12 October 1995 (age 31)	13	2	2021	(England) Stoke City	Loan	2021
14	Jordan Storey	(England)	CB	22 September 1997 (age 29)	76	2	2018	(England) Exeter City	Undisclosed	2022
15	Joe Rafferty	(Republic of Ireland) (England)	RB/LB/DM	6 October 1993 (age 33)	65	1	2019	(England) Rochdale	Undisclosed	2022
16	Andrew Hughes	(Wales)	LB/CB	5 June 1992 (age 34)	98	4	2018	(England) Peterborough United	Undisclosed	2022
23	Paul Huntington	(England)	CB	17 September 1987 (age 39)	305	18	2012	(England) Yeovil Town	Free	2022
37	Greg Cunningham	(Republic of Ireland)	LB/CB	31 January 1991 (age 35)	122	5	2021	(Wales) Cardiff City	Undisclosed	2023
Midfielders
7	Tom Bayliss	(England)	CM/DM/RM	6 April 1999 (age 27)	20	1	2019	(England) Coventry City	£2,000,000	2023
8	Alan Browne	(Republic of Ireland)	CM/DM/AM/RB	15 April 1995 (age 31)	292	35	2014	Free agent	Free	2024
11	Daniel Johnson	(Jamaica)	AM/CM	8 October 1992 (age 34)	254	48	2015	(England) Aston Villa	£50,000	2023
12	Paul Gallagher	(Scotland)	CM/LM/RM	9 August 1984 (age 42)	315	45	2015	(England) Leicester City	Free	2021
17	Benjamin Whiteman	(England)	CM/AM/RM	17 June 1996 (age 30)	23	1	2021	(England) Doncaster Rovers	Undislosed	2024
18	Ryan Ledson	(England)	CM/DM	19 August 1997 (age 29)	83	2	2018	(England) Oxford United	Undisclosed	2023
21	Jayson Molumby	(Republic of Ireland)	CM/DM	6 August 1999 (age 27)	16	0	2021	(England) Brighton & Hove Albion	Loan	2021
30	Jack Baxter	(England)	DM/CM	17 October 2000 (age 26)	0	0	2017	Academy	Trainee	2022
42	Anthony Gordon	(England)	LW/AM/RW	24 February 2001 (age 25)	11	0	2021	(England) Everton	Loan	2021
44	Brad Potts	(England)	CM/RM/AM	3 July 1994 (age 32)	91	9	2019	(England) Barnsley	Undisclosed	2022
Forwards
9	Louis Moult	(England)	CF/SS	14 May 1992 (age 34)	40	8	2018	(Scotland) Motherwell	Undisclosed	2021
19	Emil Riis Jakobsen	(Denmark)	CF	24 June 1998 (age 28)	39	3	2020	(Denmark) Randers	Undisclosed	2024
24	Sean Maguire	(Republic of Ireland) (England)	CF/SS/RW	1 May 1994 (age 32)	129	22	2017	(Republic of Ireland) Cork City	Undisclosed	2023
26	Ched Evans	(Wales)	CF	28 December 1988 (age 37)	21	5	2021	(England) Fleetwood Town	Undisclosed	2023
29	Tom Barkhuizen	(England)	RW/LW/CF	4 July 1993 (age 33)	195	38	2017	(England) Morecambe	Free	2022
31	Scott Sinclair	(England)	LW/SS/AM	25 March 1989 (age 37)	58	12	2020	(Scotland) Celtic	Undisclosed	2022
39	Billy Bodin	(Wales) (England)	LW/RW/AM	24 March 1992 (age 34)	44	4	2018	(England) Bristol Rovers	Undisclosed	2021
Out on loan:
3	Josh Earl	(England)	LB/CB	24 October 1998 (age 28)	43	0	2017	Academy	Trainee	2023
10	Josh Harrop	(England)	AM/LM	15 December 1995 (age 30)	92	13	2017	(England) Manchester United	Undisclosed	2023
20	Jayden Stockley	(England)	CF	15 September 1993 (age 33)	71	9	2019	(England) Exeter City	£750,000	2022
32	Adam O'Reilly	(Republic of Ireland)	CM	11 May 2001 (age 25)	1	0	2016	(Republic of Ireland) Ringmahon Rangers	Undisclosed	2023
35	David Nugent	(England)	CF	2 May 1985 (age 41)	132	38	2019	(England) Derby County	Free	2021
	Graham Burke	(Republic of Ireland)	SS	21 September 1993 (age 33)	15	2	2018	(Republic of Ireland) Shamrock Rovers	Undisclosed	2021

- All appearances and goals up to date as of 8 May 2021.

=== Statistics ===
As of 8 May 2021

No.	Pos	Nat	Player	Total		Championship		FA Cup		League Cup	
No.	Pos	Nat	Player	Apps	Goals	Apps	Goals	Apps	Goals	Apps	Goals
1	GK	(England) ENG	Declan Rudd	23	0	22+0	0	0+0	0	1+0	0
2	DF	(Netherlands) NED	Sepp van den Berg	16	0	15+1	0	0+0	0	0+0	0
5	DF	(Germany) GER	Patrick Bauer	15	2	12+0	1	0+0	0	3+0	1
6	DF	(Scotland) SCO	Liam Lindsay	13	2	13+0	2	0+0	0	0+0	0
7	MF	(England) ENG	Tom Bayliss	15	1	2+9	1	1+0	0	3+0	0
8	MF	(Republic of Ireland) IRL	Alan Browne	41	4	37+1	4	0+1	0	2+0	0
11	MF	(Jamaica) JAM	Daniel Johnson	34	5	24+9	4	0+0	0	0+1	1
12	MF	(Scotland) SCO	Paul Gallagher	15	0	6+7	0	0+0	0	2+0	0
14	DF	(England) ENG	Jordan Storey	32	1	27+3	1	1+0	0	1+0	0
15	DF	(Republic of Ireland) IRL	Joe Rafferty	26	0	15+7	0	1+0	0	2+1	0
16	DF	(Wales) WAL	Andrew Hughes	37	0	32+2	0	1+0	0	2+0	0
17	MF	(England) ENG	Benjamin Whiteman	23	1	20+3	1	0+0	0	0+0	0
18	MF	(England) ENG	Ryan Ledson	38	2	31+5	2	1+0	0	0+1	0
19	FW	(Denmark) DEN	Emil Riis Jakobsen	39	3	17+21	2	1+0	1	0+0	0
21	MF	(Republic of Ireland) IRL	Jayson Molumby	16	0	7+8	0	1+0	0	0+0	0
22	GK	(Denmark) DEN	Daniel Iversen	23	0	23+0	0	0+0	0	0+0	0
23	DF	(England) ENG	Paul Huntington	24	0	18+3	0	0+1	0	2+0	0
24	FW	(Republic of Ireland) IRL	Sean Maguire	33	4	15+14	3	0+1	0	2+1	1
25	GK	(England) ENG	Connor Ripley	4	0	1+0	0	1+0	0	2+0	0
26	FW	(Wales) WAL	Ched Evans	21	5	19+2	5	0+0	0	0+0	0
29	FW	(England) ENG	Tom Barkhuizen	47	6	29+16	4	0+0	0	1+1	2
31	FW	(England) ENG	Scott Sinclair	40	9	33+4	9	0+0	0	0+3	0
37	DF	(Republic of Ireland) IRL	Greg Cunningham	11	1	10+1	1	0+0	0	0+0	0
39	FW	(Wales) WAL	Billy Bodin	5	0	1+3	0	0+0	0	1+0	0
42	MF	(England) ENG	Anthony Gordon	11	0	5+6	0	0+0	0	0+0	0
44	MF	(England) ENG	Brad Potts	45	5	22+20	5	1+0	0	2+0	0
Players out on loan:
3	DF	(England) ENG	Josh Earl	7	0	4+1	0	1+0	0	1+0	0
10	MF	(England) ENG	Josh Harrop	8	1	1+4	0	0+0	0	3+0	1
20	FW	(England) ENG	Jayden Stockley	19	1	4+12	1	1+0	0	2+0	0
Players who left the club:
2	DF	(England) ENG	Darnell Fisher	16	1	14+0	1	0+1	0	1+0	0
4	MF	(England) ENG	Ben Pearson	11	0	8+1	0	0+0	0	1+1	0
6	DF	(England) ENG	Ben Davies	19	0	19+0	0	0+0	0	0+0	0

==== Goals record ====
As of 8 May 2021

Rank	No.	Nat.	Po.	Name	Championship	FA Cup	League Cup	Total
1	31	(England)	LW	Scott Sinclair	9	0	0	9
2	29	(England)	RW	Tom Barkhuizen	4	0	2	6
3	11	(Jamaica)	AM	Daniel Johnson	4	0	1	5
3	26	(Wales)	CF	Ched Evans	5	0	0	5
3	44	(England)	CM	Brad Potts	5	0	0	5
6	8	(Republic of Ireland)	CM	Alan Browne	4	0	0	4
6	24	(Republic of Ireland)	CF	Sean Maguire	3	0	1	4
8	19	(Denmark)	CF	Emil Riis Jakobsen	2	1	0	3
9	5	(Germany)	CB	Patrick Bauer	1	0	1	2
9	6	(Scotland)	CB	Liam Lindsay	2	0	0	2
9	18	(England)	CM	Ryan Ledson	2	0	0	2
11	~~2~~	(England)	RB	Darnell Fisher	1	0	0	1
11	7	(England)	CM	Tom Bayliss	1	0	0	1
11	10	(England)	AM	Josh Harrop	0	0	1	1
11	14	(England)	CB	Jordan Storey	1	0	0	1
11	17	(England)	CM	Benjamin Whiteman	1	0	0	1
11	20	(England)	CF	Jayden Stockley	1	0	0	1
11	37	(Republic of Ireland)	LB	Greg Cunningham	1	0	0	1
Own Goals					1	0	0	1
Total					47	1	6	52

==== Disciplinary record ====
As of 8 May 2021

Rank	No.	Nat.	Po.	Name	Championship			FA Cup			League Cup			Total		
Rank	No.	Nat.	Po.	Name	Yellow card	(yellow card) (yellow-red card)	Red card	Yellow card	(yellow card) (yellow-red card)	Red card	Yellow card	(yellow card) (yellow-red card)	Red card	Yellow card	(yellow card) (yellow-red card)	Red card
1	18	(England)	CM	Ryan Ledson	10	0	0	0	0	0	0	0	0	10	0	0
2	8	(Republic of Ireland)	CM	Alan Browne	6	0	1	0	0	0	1	0	0	7	0	1
3	~~2~~	(England)	RB	Darnell Fisher	5	0	0	0	0	0	1	0	0	6	0	0
5	24	(Republic of Ireland)	CF	Sean Maguire	4	0	0	0	0	0	0	0	0	4	0	0
6	23	(England)	CB	Paul Huntington	1	0	0	0	0	0	2	0	0	3	0	0
6	37	(Republic of Ireland)	LB	Greg Cunningham	3	0	0	0	0	0	0	0	0	3	0	0
8	~~4~~	(England)	DM	Ben Pearson	1	0	0	0	0	0	1	0	0	2	0	0
8	15	(Republic of Ireland)	RB	Joe Rafferty	1	0	1	0	0	0	0	0	0	1	0	1
8	17	(England)	CM	Benjamin Whiteman	2	0	0	0	0	0	0	0	0	2	0	0
8	21	(Republic of Ireland)	CM	Jayson Molumby	2	0	0	0	0	0	0	0	0	2	0	0
8	26	(Wales)	CF	Ched Evans	2	0	0	0	0	0	0	0	0	2	0	0
8	44	(England)	CM	Brad Potts	2	0	0	0	0	0	0	0	0	2	0	0
14	3	(England)	LB	Josh Earl	1	0	0	0	0	0	0	0	0	1	0	0
14	5	(Germany)	CB	Patrick Bauer	1	0	0	0	0	0	0	0	0	1	0	0
14	6	(England)	LB	Liam Lindsay	1	0	0	0	0	0	0	0	0	1	0	0
14	~~6~~	(England)	CB	Ben Davies	1	0	0	0	0	0	0	0	0	1	0	0
14	7	(England)	CM	Tom Bayliss	0	0	0	0	0	0	1	0	0	1	0	0
14	10	(England)	AM	Josh Harrop	1	0	0	0	0	0	0	0	0	1	0	0
14	16	(Wales)	LB	Andrew Hughes	1	0	0	0	0	0	0	0	0	1	0	0
14	29	(England)	RW	Tom Barkhuizen	0	0	1	0	0	0	0	0	0	0	0	1
14	31	(England)	LW	Scott Sinclair	1	0	0	0	0	0	0	0	0	1	0	0
14	42	(England)	LW	Anthony Gordon	1	0	0	0	0	0	0	0	0	1	0	0
Total					51	0	3	0	0	0	6	0	0	57	0	3

== Transfers ==
=== Transfers in ===
Date	Position	Nationality	Name	From	Fee	Ref.
1 October 2020	CF	(Denmark)	Emil Riis Jakobsen	(Denmark) Randers	£1,350,000	
14 January 2021	CM	(England)	Ben Whiteman	(England) Doncaster Rovers	£1,600,000	
6 February 2021	LB	(Republic of Ireland)	Greg Cunningham	(Wales) Cardiff City	Undisclosed	
6 February 2021	CF	(Wales)	Ched Evans	(England) Fleetwood Town	Undisclosed	

=== Loans in ===
Date from	Position	Nationality	Name	From	Date until	Ref.
5 January 2021	CM	(Republic of Ireland)	Jayson Molumby	(England) Brighton & Hove Albion	30 June 2021	
6 January 2021	CF	(Wales)	Ched Evans	(England) Fleetwood Town	6 February 2021	
7 January 2021	GK	(Denmark)	Daniel Iversen	(England) Leicester City	End of season	
28 January 2021	LB	(Republic of Ireland)	Greg Cunningham	(Wales) Cardiff City	6 February 2021	
1 February 2021	CB	(Scotland)	Liam Lindsay	(England) Stoke City	End of season	
1 February 2021	CB	(Netherlands)	Sepp van den Berg	(England) Liverpool	End of season	
1 February 2021	AM	(England)	Anthony Gordon	(England) Everton	End of season	

=== Loans out ===
Date from	Position	Nationality	Name	To	Date until	Ref.
1 August 2020	SS	(Republic of Ireland)	Graham Burke	(Republic of Ireland) Shamrock Rovers	End of season	
2 September 2020	LW	(England)	Josh Ginnelly	(Scotland) Heart of Midlothian	End of season	
12 September 2020	CF	(England)	Ethan Walker	(England) Carlisle United	8 January 2021	
30 September 2020	DM	(England)	Jack Baxter	(England) Chorley	2 November 2020	
30 September 2020	CF	(England)	Joe Rodwell-Grant	(England) Chorley	30 October 2020	
17 October 2020	CF	(England)	Jacob Holland-Wilkinson	(England) Lancaster City	November 2020	
23 October 2020	GK	(England)	Mathew Hudson	(England) Bamber Bridge	28 November 2020	
23 October 2020	CM	(Republic of Ireland)	Adam O'Reilly	(England) Bamber Bridge	January 2021	
30 October 2020	CF	(England)	Joe Rodwell-Grant	(England) Bamber Bridge	December 2020	
2 November 2020	DM	(England)	Jack Baxter	(England) Stalybridge Celtic	2 January 2021	
20 January 2021	AM	(England)	Josh Harrop	(England) Ipswich Town	End of season	
22 January 2021	CF	(England)	Jayden Stockley	(England) Charlton Athletic	End of season	
23 January 2021	LW	(England)	Ethan Walker	(England) Carlisle United	End of season	
1 February 2021	LB	(England)	Josh Earl	(England) Burton Albion	End of season	
1 February 2021	CF	(England)	David Nugent	(England) Tranmere Rovers	End of season	
22 February 2021	CM	(Republic of Ireland)	Adam O'Reilly	(Republic of Ireland) Waterford	End of season	

=== Transfers out ===
Date	Position	Nationality	Name	To	Fee	Ref.
1 July 2020	LB	(Scotland)	Jack Armer	(England) Carlisle United	Released	
1 July 2020	CB	(England)	Tom Clarke	(England) Salford City	Released	
1 July 2020	GK	(Wales)	Michael Crowe	(Norway) Viking FK	Released	
1 July 2020	AM	(England)	Tyrhys Dolan	(England) Blackburn Rovers	Free transfer	
1 July 2020	CF	(England)	Louis Potts	(England) Workington	Free transfer	
1 July 2020	CF	(England)	Connor Simpson	(Republic of Ireland) Cork City	Released	
1 July 2020	CB	(England)	Tyler Williams	(England) Stalybridge Celtic	Free transfer	
22 July 2020	CM	(Republic of Ireland)	Brian McManus	(Republic of Ireland) Shelbourne	Free transfer	
28 August 2020	CM	(England)	Joe Nolan	(England) Runcorn Linnets	Free transfer	
28 January 2021	RB	(England)	Darnell Fisher	(England) Middlesbrough	Undisclosed	
28 January 2021	CM	(England)	Ben Pearson	(England) Bournemouth	Undisclosed	
1 February 2021	CB	(England)	Ben Davies	(England) Liverpool	£500,000	

Kevin O’Connor

== Pre-season and friendlies ==
Win Draw Loss Fixtures

22 August 2020 Friendly	Salford City	1–3	Preston North End	Salford
15:00 BST	Hunter 28'	Report	Sinclair 22'; Bodin 24'; Harrop 86'	Stadium: The Peninsula Stadium; Referee: Scott Oldham

25 August 2020 Friendly	Tranmere Rovers	1–1	Preston North End	Birkenhead
15:00 BST	Payne 89'	Report	Barkhuizen 32'	Stadium: Prenton Park; Attendance: 0 Referee: S Bolton

1 September 2020 Friendly	Preston North End	0–0	Burnley	Preston
14:00 BST		Report		Stadium: Deepdale; Attendance: 0 Referee: Jeremy Simpson

4 September 2020 Friendly	Sheffield United	2–2	Preston North End	Sheffield
14:00 BST	Lundstram 36'; Sharp 58' (pen.)	Report	Johnson 54' (pen.); Stockley 90+1'	Stadium: Bramall Lane; Attendance: 0 Referee: Jonathan Moss

5 September 2020 Friendly	Everton	2–0	Preston North End	Walton
15:00 BST	Kenny 7'; Calvert-Lewin 65'	Report		Stadium: Goodison Park; Attendance: 0 Referee: Robert Jones

== Competitions ==
=== Overview ===
Competition	First match	Last match	Starting round	Final position	Record							
Competition	First match	Last match	Starting round	Final position	Pld	W	D	L	GF	GA	GD	Win %
EFL Championship	12 September 2020	May 2021	Matchday 1		14	5	1	8	17	21	−4	35.71
FA Cup	January 2021		Third round		0	0	0	0	0	0	+0	—
EFL Cup	29 August 2020	23 September 2020	First round	Third round	3	2	0	1	6	3	+3	66.67
Total					17	7	1	9	23	24	−1	41.18

Last updated: 28 November 2020
Source: Competitions

=== Championship ===
==== League table ====
Pos	Team	Pld	W	D	L	GF	GA	GD	Pts
10	Middlesbrough	46	18	10	18	55	53	+2	64
11	Millwall	46	15	17	14	47	52	−5	62
12	Luton Town	46	17	11	18	41	52	−11	62
13	Preston North End	46	18	7	21	49	56	−7	61
14	Stoke City	46	15	15	16	50	52	−2	60
15	Blackburn Rovers	46	15	12	19	65	54	+11	57
16	Coventry City	46	14	13	19	49	61	−12	55

Source: EFL Official Website
Rules for classification: 1) Points; 2) Goal difference; 3) Number of goals scored; 4) Head-to-head results; 5) Wins; 6) Away goals; 7) Penalty points (sec 9.5); 8) 12-point sending off offences

==== Results summary ====
Overall								Home						Away					
Pld	W	D	L	GF	GA	GD	Pts	W	D	L	GF	GA	GD	W	D	L	GF	GA	GD
46	18	7	21	49	56	−7	61	7	5	11	21	24	−3	11	2	10	28	32	−4

Last updated: 8 May 2021.

==== Results by matchday ====
Matchday	1	2	3	4	5	6	7	8	9	10	11	12	13	14	15	16	17	18	19	20	21	22	23	24	25	26	27	28	29	30	31	32	33	34	35	36	37	38	39	40	41	42	43	44	45	46
Ground	H	A	H	A	H	A	A	H	H	A	A	H	H	A	A	H	H	A	A	H	A	H	H	A	A	H	A	H	A	H	A	H	H	A	H	A	A	H	H	A	H	A	H	A	H	A
Result	L	D	L	W	L	W	W	L	L	W	L	W	L	L	W	D	W	L	L	W	W	W	L	L	W	D	L	L	W	L	L	D	W	L	D	L	L	L	D	W	L	D	W	W	W	W
Position	19	16	19	14	18	15	12	13	16	12	14	12	15	18	15	15	13	15	16	15	13	11	12	13	10	11	11	11	10	13	14	14	13	14	13	15	16	16	17	16	16	17	14	14	13	12

Updated to match(es) played on 8 May 2021. Source:
A = Away; H = Home; W = Win; D = Draw; L = Loss

==== Matches ====
The 2020–21 season fixtures were released on 21 August.

12 September 2020 1	Preston North End	0–1	Swansea City	Preston
15:00 BST		Report	Gibbs-White 53'	Stadium: Deepdale; Attendance: 0 Referee: Robert Jones

19 September 2020 2	Norwich City	2–2	Preston North End	Norwich
15:00 BST	Pukki 31'; Quintillà (yellow card) 47'; Płacheta 85'	Report	Sinclair 14' (pen.) (yellow card) 82'; Fisher (yellow card) 34' (goal) 42'	Stadium: Carrow Road; Attendance: 0 Referee: John Brooks

26 September 2020 3	Preston North End	0–1	Stoke City	Preston
15:00 BST	Barkhuizen (red card); Maguire (yellow card) 90+1'	Report	Gregory 39'; McClean (yellow card) 58'; Smith (yellow card) 66'; Brown (yellow card) 87'	Stadium: Deepdale; Referee: Matt Donohue

4 October 2020 4	Brentford	2–4	Preston North End	Brentford
14:00 BST	Toney 8', 43'	Report	Sinclair 52', 60'; Potts 63'; Maguire 70'	Stadium: Brentford Community Stadium; Attendance: 0 Referee: Dean Whitestone

18 October 2020 5	Preston North End	0–1	Cardiff City	Preston
12:00 BST	Browne (yellow card) 60'	Report	Ojo 52'	Stadium: Deepdale; Attendance: 0 Referee: Keith Stroud

21 October 2020 6	Queens Park Rangers	0–2	Preston North End	Shepherd's Bush
19:45 BST		Report	Ledson (yellow card) 15'; Johnson 24' (pen.); Sinclair 60' (pen.)	Stadium: Kiyan Prince Foundation Stadium; Attendance: 0 Referee: Kevin Friend

24 October 2020 7	Huddersfield Town	1–2	Preston North End	Huddersfield
15:00 BST	Campbell 8'; Schindler (yellow card) 41'; Stearman (yellow card) 44'; Sarr (red card) 78'; Koroma (yellow card) 87'	Report	Potts (yellow card) 44'; Browne 51', 53' (yellow card) 66'; Bauer (yellow card) 70'; Maguire (yellow card) 90+3'; Harrop (yellow card) 90+4'	Stadium: The John Smith's Stadium; Attendance: 0 Referee: Josh Smith

28 October 2020 8	Preston North End	0–2	Millwall	Preston
19:00 GMT	Johnson (yellow card) 71'; Browne (yellow card) 90+1'	Report	Zohore 54'; Wallace 84' (pen.)	Stadium: Deepdale; Attendance: 0 Referee: Darren Bond

31 October 2020 9	Preston North End	1–2	Birmingham City	Preston
15:00 GMT	Stockley 24'; Johnson (yellow card) 87'	Report	McGree 2'; Gardner 85'	Stadium: Deepdale; Attendance: 0 Referee: Tony Harrington

4 November 2020 10	Reading	0–3	Preston North End	Reading
19:45 GMT	Laurent (yellow card) 87'	Report	Fisher (yellow card) 15'; Johnson (penalty missed) 48'; Sinclair 64'; Riis Jakobsen 68'; Browne (yellow card) 87'; Potts 90+1'	Stadium: Madejski Stadium; Attendance: 0 Referee: John Brooks

7 November 2020 11	Rotherham United	2–1	Preston North End	Rotherham
15:00 GMT	Wood 53'; Ihiekwe (yellow card) 84'; Crooks 86'	Report	Johnson (yellow card) 42'; Ledson 80'; Rafferty (yellow card) 87'	Stadium: New York Stadium; Attendance: 0 Referee: Andy Davies

21 November 2020 12	Preston North End	1–0	Sheffield Wednesday	Preston
15:00 GMT	Barkhuizen 48'	Report	Windass (red card) 17' van Aken (yellow card) 86'	Stadium: Deepdale; Attendance: 0 Referee: David Webb

24 November 2020 13	Preston North End	0–3	Blackburn Rovers	Preston
19:45 GMT	Browne (yellow card) 22'; Rafferty (red card) 44'	Report	Trybull (yellow card) 36'; Armstrong 45' (pen.); Brereton 53'; Dolan 76'	Stadium: Deepdale; Attendance: 0 Referee: Tony Harrington

28 November 2020 14	Watford	4–1	Preston North End	Watford
15:00 GMT	Quina 9'; Garner (yellow card) 23'; Deeney 52' (pen.); Chalobah 58'; Pedro 74'	Report	Barkhuizen 55'	Stadium: Vicarage Road; Attendance: 0 Referee: Jarred Gillett

1 December 2020 15	Bournemouth	2–3	Preston North End	Kings Park
19:45 GMT	Cook (yellow card) 66'; Stanislas 71'; Lerma (yellow card) 79'; Surridge 86'	Report	Barkhuizen 16'; Sinclair 49'; Bauer 68'; Davies (yellow card) 73'; Pearson (yellow card) 90+2'; Ledson (yellow card) 90+8'	Stadium: Vitality Stadium; Attendance: 0 Referee: Gavin Ward

5 December 2020 16	Preston North End	2–2	Wycombe Wanderers	Preston
15:00 GMT	Barkhuizen 14'; McCarthy 87' (o.g.)	Report	Knight (yellow card) 26'; McCleary 48'; Kashket 75' (yellow card) 86'; Grimmer (yellow card) 83'	Stadium: Deepdale; Attendance: 0 Referee: James Linington

9 December 2020 17	Preston North End	3–0	Middlesbrough	Preston
19:00 GMT	Hughes 62'; Sinclair 81'; Jakobsen 83'	Report	Howson (yellow card) 22'	Stadium: Deepdale; Referee: Andrew Madley

12 December 2020 18	Luton Town	3–0	Preston North End	Luton
15:00 GMT	Collins 20', 29', 66'	Report		Stadium: Kenilworth Road; Attendance: 2,000; Referee: Jeremy Simpson

15 December 2020 19	Barnsley	2–1	Preston North End	Barnsley
19:45 GMT	Mowatt 54'; Adeboyejo 80'; Styles (yellow card) 84'; Thomas (yellow card) 90'	Report	Maguire 2'; Browne (yellow card) 63'; Johnson (yellow card) 71'	Stadium: Oakwell Stadium; Attendance: 0 Referee: Dean Whitestone

18 December 2020 20	Preston North End	1–0	Bristol City	Preston
20:00 GMT	Johnson 21' (pen.); Fisher (yellow card) 51'	Report		Stadium: Deepdale; Attendance: 0 Referee: Geoff Eltringham

26 December 2020 21	Derby County	0–1	Preston North End	Derby
15:00 GMT	Waghorn (red card) 20'	Report	Fisher (yellow card) 43'; Browne 90+6'	Stadium: Pride Park Stadium; Attendance: 0 Referee: Darren Bond

29 December 2020 22	Preston North End	2–0	Coventry City	Preston
19:45 GMT	Johnson 18'; Hughes (yellow card) 31'; Maguire 53' (yellow card) 89'; Earl (yellow card) 63'	Report		Stadium: Deepdale; Attendance: 0 Referee: Keith Stroud

2 January 2021 23	Preston North End	0–1	Nottingham Forest	Preston
15:00 GMT	Ledson (yellow card) 24'	Report	Sow (yellow card) 21'; Figueiredo (yellow card) 52'; Grabban 70' (pen.); Taylor (yellow card) 90+6'	Stadium: Deepdale; Attendance: 0 Referee: Tim Robinson

16 January 2021 24	Bristol City	2–0	Preston North End	Bristol
15:00 GMT	Diédhiou 8'; Palmer (yellow card) 61'; Vyner 77'	Report	Fisher (yellow card) 83'	Stadium: Ashton Gate; Attendance: 0 Referee: Dean Whitestone

20 January 2021 25	Birmingham City	0–1	Preston North End	Bordesley
19:45 GMT	Friend (yellow card) 22'; Gardner (yellow card) 90'	Report	Sinclair 61'	Stadium: St Andrew's Stadium; Attendance: 0 Referee: Tony Harrington

24 January 2021 26	Preston North End	0–0	Reading	Preston
12:30 GMT	Molumby (yellow card) 65'; Huntington (yellow card) 82'; Ledson (yellow card) 87'; Whiteman (yellow card) 87'	Report	João (penalty missed) 83'	Stadium: Deepdale; Attendance: 0 Referee: Geoff Eltringham

30 January 2021 27	Sheffield Wednesday	1–0	Preston North End	Owlerton
15:00 GMT	Palmer 45'; Urhoghide (yellow card) 86'	Report	Whiteman (yellow card) 54'	Stadium: Hillsborough; Attendance: 0 Referee: Andre Marriner

6 February 2021 28	Preston North End	1–2	Rotherham United	Preston
15:00 GMT	Evans (yellow card) 37', (goal) 65'	Report	Rafferty 1' (o.g.); Barlaser (yellow card) 26'; Wiles 55'; Ihiekwe (yellow card) 72'; Crooks (yellow card) 90+3'	Stadium: Deepdale; Attendance: 0 Referee: Gavin Ward

12 February 2021 29	Blackburn Rovers	1–2	Preston North End	Blackburn
19:45 GMT	Armstrong 45+1' (pen.)		Cunningham 19'; Lindsay 43'; Ledson (yellow card) 61'	Stadium: Ewood Park; Attendance: 0 Referee: David Webb

16 February 2021 30	Preston North End	0–1	Watford	Preston
19:00 GMT		Report	Pedro 51' (pen.); Cleverley (yellow card) 63'	Stadium: Deepdale; Attendance: 0 Referee: Tony Harrington

20 February 2021 31	Cardiff City	4–0	Preston North End	Cardiff
15:00 GMT	Moore 2' (pen.); Murphy 46'; Flint (yellow card) 65'; Pack 70'; Harris 77'; Bennett (yellow card) 90+1'	Report	Gallagher (penalty missed) 64'; Evans (penalty missed) 66'	Stadium: Cardiff City Stadium; Attendance: 0 Referee: Jeremy Simpson

24 February 2021 32	Preston North End	0–0	Queens Park Rangers	Preston
19:45 GMT		Report	Johansen (yellow card) 70'; Dickie (yellow card) 72'	Stadium: Deepdale; Attendance: 0 Referee: Darren England

27 February 2021 33	Preston North End	3–0	Huddersfield Town	Preston
15:00 GMT	Potts 23'; Evans 67'; Gordon (yellow card) 75'; Cunningham (yellow card) 77'; Sinclair 80'	Report	Edmonds-Green (yellow card) 35'; Bacuna (yellow card) 57'; Pipa (yellow card) 75'	Stadium: Deepdale; Attendance: 0 Referee: James Linington

2 March 2021 34	Millwall	2–1	Preston North End	Bermondsey
19:00 GMT	Malone 39'; Bennett 86'; Evans (yellow card) 90+4'	Report	Evans 12'; Molumby (yellow card) 58'	Stadium: The Den; Attendance: 0 Referee: Keith Stroud

6 March 2021 35	Preston North End	1–1	AFC Bournemouth	Preston
15:00 GMT	Johnson (yellow card) 33', (goal) 70'; Cunningham (yellow card) 73'	Report	Danjuma 37'	Stadium: Deepdale; Attendance: 0 Referee: Jarred Gillett

13 March 2021 36	Wycombe Wanderers	1–0	Preston North End	High Wycombe
15:00 GMT	Tafazolli 27'; Horgan (yellow card) 38'; McCleary (yellow card) 56'	Report	Maguire (yellow card) 58'	Stadium: Adams Park; Attendance: 0 Referee: Tim Robinson

16 March 2021 37	Middlesbrough	2–0	Preston North End	Middlesbrough
19:00 GMT	Storey 22' (o.g.); Tavernier 51'; Fisher (yellow card) 66'	Report	Browne (red card) 36'; Potts (yellow card) 62' Alex Neil (red card)	Stadium: Riverside Stadium; Attendance: 0 Referee: Oliver Langford

20 March 2021 38	Preston North End	0–1	Luton Town	Preston
15:00 GMT		Report	Iversen 83' (o.g.)	Stadium: Deepdale; Attendance: 0 Referee: Thomas Bramall

2 April 2021 39	Preston North End	1–1	Norwich City	Preston
15:00 BST	Ledson (yellow card) 9'; Potts 90+4'	Report	Buendía 17'	Stadium: Deepdale; Attendance: 0 Referee: Dean Whitestone

5 April 2021 40	Swansea City	0–1	Preston North End	Swansea
15:00 BST	Guéhi (yellow card) 45'; Lowe (yellow card) 64'	Report	Grimes 90+1' (o.g.)	Stadium: The Liberty Stadium; Attendance: 0 Referee: Peter Bankes

10 April 2021 41	Preston North End	0–5	Brentford	Preston
15:00 BST	Ledson (yellow card) 45+3'	Report	Mbeumo 9'; Forss 26'; Toney 75'; Canós 82'; Marcondes 90+1'	Stadium: Deepdale; Attendance: 0 Referee: Tony Harrington

17 April 2021 42	Stoke City	0–0	Preston North End	Stoke-on-Trent
12:30 BST	Chester (yellow card) 53'; Clucas (yellow card) 67'; Souttar (red card) 87'	Report	Ledson (yellow card) 62'	Stadium: Bet365 Stadium; Attendance: 0 Referee: James Linington

20 April 2021 43	Preston North End	3–0	Derby County	Preston
19:00 BST	Whiteman 18'; Evans 73'; Ledson 87'	Report	Byrne (yellow card) 86'	Stadium: Deepdale; Attendance: 0 Referee: Geoff Eltringham

24 April 2021 44	Coventry City	0–1	Preston North End	Bordesley
15:00 BST	Hamer (yellow card) 44'; Dabo (yellow card) 76'; McFadzean (yellow card) 80'	Report	Browne 67' (pen.); Ledson (yellow card) 76'; Evans (yellow card) 90+3'	Stadium: St Andrew's Stadium; Attendance: 0 Referee: Andy Woolmer

1 May 2021 45	Preston North End	2–0	Barnsley	Preston
15:00 BST	Storey 38'; Evans 49'; Whiteman (yellow card) 58'	Report	Helik (yellow card) 45+1'; Dike (yellow card) 72'	Stadium: Deepdale; Attendance: 0 Referee: Matt Donohue

8 May 2021 46	Nottingham Forest	1–2	Preston North End	West Bridgford
12:30 BST	Garner 17'; Samba (yellow card) 53'	Report	Bayliss 53'; Ledson (yellow card) 63'; Lindsay 67'	Stadium: City Ground; Attendance: 0 Referee: Darren Bond

=== FA Cup ===
The third round draw was made on 30 November, with Premier League and EFL Championship clubs all entering the competition.

9 January 2021 Third round	Wycombe Wanderers	4–1	Preston North End	High Wycombe
15:00 GMT	Onyedinma 3'; Jacobson 9' (pen.); Knight 25'; Allsop (yellow card) 42'; Horgan (yellow card) 61'; Adeniran (yellow card) 64'; Samuel 82'	Report	Riis 43' (pen.)	Stadium: Adams Park; Attendance: 0 Referee: Matt Donohue

=== EFL Cup ===
The first round draw was made on 18 August, live on Sky Sports, by Paul Merson. The draw for both the second and third round were confirmed on September 6, live on Sky Sports by Phil Babb.

29 August 2020 First round	Preston North End	4–0	Mansfield Town	Preston
15:00 BST	Barkhuizen 14'; Maguire 22'; Bauer 29'; Harrop 65'	Report		Stadium: Deepdale; Attendance: 0 Referee: Ross Joyce

15 September 2020 Second round	Derby County	1–2	Preston North End	Derby
18:30 BST	Buchanan (yellow card) 27'; Knight 51' te Wierik (red card) 55'; Shinnie (yellow card) 65'; Evans (yellow card) 88'	Report	Huntington (yellow card) 59'; Browne (yellow card) 73'; Fisher (yellow card) 75'; Barkhuizen 79'; Johnson 90+2' (pen.)	Stadium: Pride Park Stadium; Attendance: 0 Referee: Andy Davies

23 September 2020 Third round	Preston North End	0–2	Brighton & Hove Albion	Preston
19:00 BST	Bayliss (yellow card) 10'	Report	Jahanbakhsh 57'; Mac Allister 75'	Stadium: Deepdale; Attendance: 0 Referee: Steve Martin
