= Jamie Thomas (footballer, born 1997) =

English-born Welsh footballer

Personal information
- Full name: Jamie Carl Thomas
- Date of birth: 10 January 1997 (age 29)
- Place of birth: Blackpool, England
- Height: 1.78 m (5 ft 10 in)
- Positions: Forward; midfielder

Team information
- Current team: Bamber Bridge

Youth career
- 2005–2013: Blackpool
- 2013–2015: Bolton Wanderers

Senior career*
Years	Team	Apps	(Gls)
2015–2016	Bolton Wanderers	0	(0)
2016–2018	Burnley	0	(0)
2016	→ Ayr United (loan)	3	(0)
2018–2019	Squires Gate		
2019–2021	A.F.C. Blackpool		
2021	Bamber Bridge	0	(0)
2021–2022	Preston North End	0	(0)
2022	→ FC Halifax Town (loan)	8	(0)
2022–	Bamber Bridge	0	(0)

International career
2014–2015	Wales U19	8	(4)
- * Club domestic league appearances and goals as of 00:02, 26 January 2022 (UTC)

Jamie Carl Thomas (born 10 January 1997) is an English-born Welsh footballer who plays for Bamber Bridge. He has also represented Wales internationally at under-19 level.

== Club career ==
Born in Blackpool, Lancashire, Thomas started his career with local club Blackpool where he spent eight years before transferring to Bolton Wanderers to start his two-year scholarship. In his first year scholar, playing in the under 18 Premier League, Thomas scored 17 goals and in his second year scholar he scored 15 goals. After completing his two-year scholarship, he was rewarded with another one-year extension to his scholarship in May 2015. In April 2016, he was thrown into first-team action featuring as an unused substitute for Championship matches against Cardiff City and Hull City. At the end of the 2015–16 campaign he was released from the club as Bolton were relegated to League One.

Following his release from Bolton, he joined newly promoted Premier League side Burnley on a two-year contract to play for the Development Squad. In July 2016, he was sent out on loan to Scottish Championship side Ayr United on a six-month loan deal, however the loan was cut short in October after Ayr manager Ian McCall deemed that Thomas' game time would be limited. On 11 April 2018, Burnley announced the releasing of the forward to the end of the 2017–18 season.

On 6 October 2018 Thomas signed for Squires Gate. A year later he signed for A.F.C. Blackpool.

On 28 June 2021, he signed for Bamber Bridge. A month later he went on trial with EFL Championship team Preston North End after scoring against them twice for Bamber Bridge in a pre-season friendly. During the trial he scored for Preston in 1–1 pre-season draw against Accrington Stanley. The trial was successful and on 5 August he signed a one-year contract with Preston, with Preston having the option to extend it for a further year.

On 25 January 2022, Thomas joined National League side FC Halifax Town on loan for the remainder of the 2021–22 season.

Thomas was released at the end of the 2021–22 season.

On 1 November 2022, Thomas returned to Bamber Bridge.

== International career ==
Despite being born in England, Thomas qualifies to represent Wales through his parentage. In August 2014, he received his first call-up to international duty for the under-19 side, for an international friendly double-header against Montenegro. He went on to start the game and scored on his debut in a 3–1 win, and followed it up with another goal in the reverse fixture which Wales won again 2–1. He went on to feature in all of the qualifiers for the 2015 UEFA European Under-19 Championship against Portugal, Denmark and Albania as Wales failed to qualify, scoring twice in six games.

== Personal life ==
In 2018 and 2019, after not playing for 14 months, Thomas suffered from anxiety and depression.

== Career statistics ==
As of match played 10 August 2021

Appearances and goals by club, season and competition
Club	Season	League			National Cup		League Cup		Other		Total	
Club	Season	Division	Apps	Goals	Apps	Goals	Apps	Goals	Apps	Goals	Apps	Goals
Bolton Wanderers	2015–16	Championship	0	0	0	0	0	0	—		0	0
Burnley	2016–17	Premier League	0	0	0	0	0	0	—		0	0
Burnley	2017–18	Premier League	0	0	0	0	0	0	—		0	0
Burnley	Total		0	0	0	0	0	0	—		0	0
Ayr United (loan)	2016–17	Scottish Championship	3	0	0	0	3	0	1 (Note: Appearances in Scottish Challenge Cup)	0	7	0
Preston North End	2021–22	Championship	0	0	0	0	1	0	—		1	0
Career total			3	0	0	0	4	0	1	0	8	0
