= James McCartan =

James McCartan may refer to:

- James McCartan Snr (1938–2021), Irish Gaelic footballer
- James McCartan Jnr, Irish Gaelic footballer, son of James McCartan Snr

== See also ==
- James McCarten, English football (soccer) player
