= Sepp van den Berg =

Dutch footballer (born 2001)

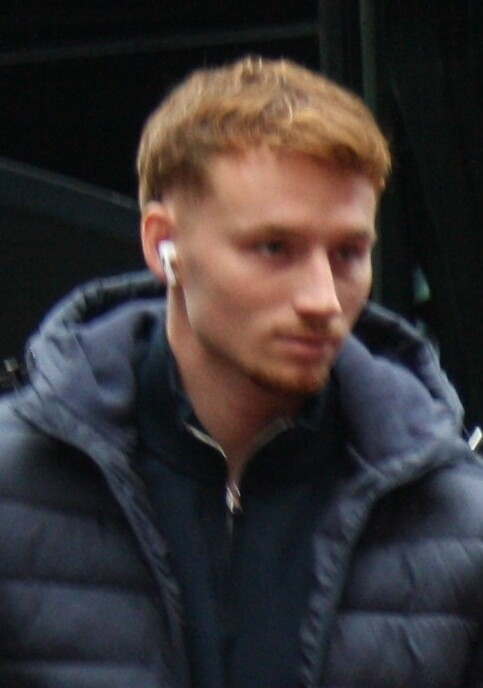
- Van den Berg in 2025

Personal information
- Full name: Sepp van den Berg
- Date of birth: 20 December 2001 (age 24)
- Place of birth: Zwolle, Netherlands
- Height: 1.92 m (6 ft 4 in)
- Positions: Centre-back; right-back

Team information
- Current team: Brentford
- Number: 4

Youth career
- 2008–2012: CSV '28
- 2012–2018: PEC Zwolle

Senior career*
Years	Team	Apps	(Gls)
2018–2019	PEC Zwolle	22	(0)
2019–2024	Liverpool	0	(0)
2020–2022	→ Preston North End (loan)	61	(1)
2022–2023	→ Schalke 04 (loan)	9	(1)
2023	→ Schalke 04 II (loan)	1	(0)
2023–2024	→ Mainz 05 (loan)	33	(3)
2024–	Brentford	63	(0)

International career
2018–2019	Netherlands U19	10	(3)
2021–2023	Netherlands U21	8	(1)
- * Club domestic league appearances and goals as of 24 May 2026 (UTC)

Sepp van den Berg (born 20 December 2001) is a Dutch professional footballer who plays either as a centre-back or right-back for Premier League club Brentford.

== Club career ==
=== PEC Zwolle ===
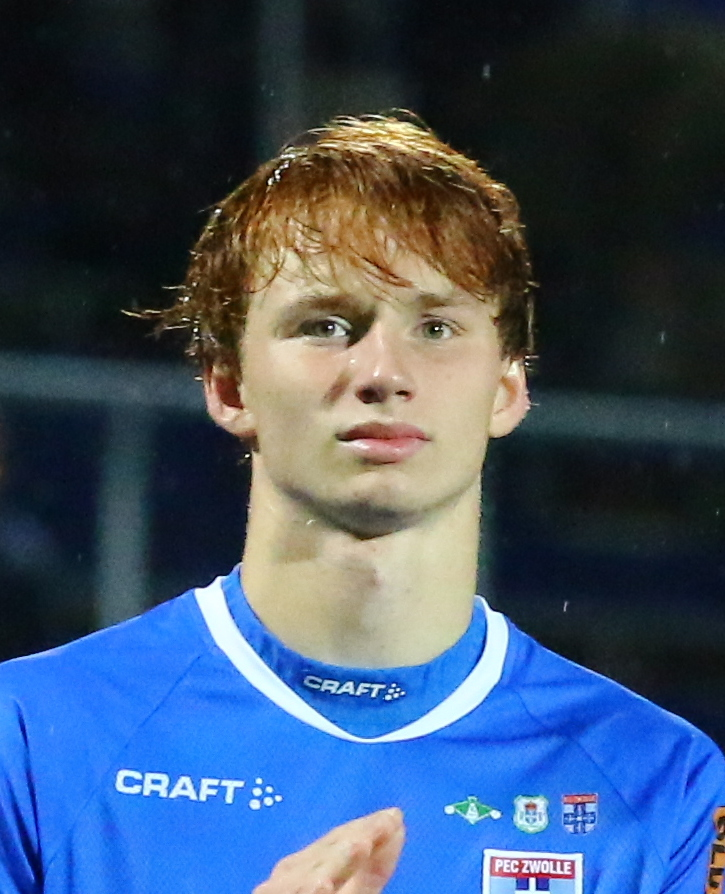
Van den Berg with PEC Zwolle in 2018

After successfully progressing through the PEC Zwolle youth ranks since 2012, Van den Berg made his first team debut on 11 March 2018, coming on as a 45th minute substitute in a 2–0 Eredivisie defeat at home to Groningen.

=== Liverpool ===
On 27 June 2019, Van den Berg joined Premier League club Liverpool for a confirmed fee of £1.3 million, which could potentially rise up to £4.4 million if all agreed clauses are activated. He made his competitive debut for the club on 25 September 2019, in an EFL Cup match against Milton Keynes Dons. Van den Berg made his first start in Liverpool's 5–5 draw with Arsenal in the EFL Cup fourth round on 30 October. Liverpool went on to win 5–4 in the penalty shoot-out.

==== Loan to Preston North End ====
On 1 February 2021, Van den Berg joined EFL Championship side Preston North End on loan for the remainder of the 2020–21 season. Five days later, he made his debut for Preston as a substitute for Paul Huntington in a 1–2 home league defeat by Rotherham United.

On 21 June 2021, Van den Berg extended his loan to Preston by an additional 12 months, to an 18-month loan deal, to remain at the club for the 2021–22 season. He scored his first professional goal in a 4–2 win at Morecambe in the EFL Cup in August 2021.

==== Loan to Schalke 04 ====
On 30 August 2022, Van den Berg joined Bundesliga side Schalke 04 on a season-long loan. He played only nine times for Die Königsblauen due to sustaining a serious ankle injury, and was unable to stop the side being relegated to the 2. Bundesliga.

==== Loan to Mainz 05 ====
On 13 July 2023, Van den Berg joined fellow Bundesliga side Mainz 05 on loan for the duration of the 2023–24 season. On 12 August 2023, he made his debut for the club in a DFB-Pokal match against SV Elversberg, coming as a substitute. On 19 December, he scored his first goal for Mainz, an equaliser in a 1–1 Bundesliga draw against Borussia Dortmund. On 17 February 2024, he scored the only goal in a 1–0 win over FC Augsburg.

=== Brentford ===
On 22 August 2024, Van den Berg joined fellow Premier League side Brentford for a reported fee of £20 million, with an additional £5 million in bonuses. He signed a five-year contract with the club.

== International career ==
Van den Berg wass a youth international for the Netherlands. After accruing 10 caps and 3 goals for Netherlands U19's, Van den Berg made his debut for Netherlands U21's in a 5–0 win against Wales on 12 October 2021. Van den Berg was called to the Netherlands soccerteam for the first time, when Virgil van Dijk had to withdraw from it in November 2026

== Personal life ==
His younger brother Rav is also a footballer, and plays for Cologne in the 1. Bundesliga.

== Career statistics ==
As of match played 24 May 2026

Appearances and goals by club, season and competition
Club	Season	League			National cup (Note: Includes KNVB Cup, FA Cup, DFB-Pokal)		League cup (Note: Includes EFL Cup)		Europe		Total	
Club	Season	Division	Apps	Goals	Apps	Goals	Apps	Goals	Apps	Goals	Apps	Goals
PEC Zwolle	2017–18	Eredivisie	7	0	0	0	—		—		7	0
PEC Zwolle	2018–19	Eredivisie	15	0	1	0	—		—		16	0
PEC Zwolle	Total		22	0	1	0	—		—		23	0
Liverpool	2019–20	Premier League	0	0	1	0	3	0	0	0	4	0
Liverpool	2020–21	Premier League	0	0	0	0	0	0	0	0	0	0
Liverpool	Total		0	0	1	0	3	0	0	0	4	0
Preston North End (loan)	2020–21	Championship	16	0	—		—		—		16	0
Preston North End (loan)	2021–22	Championship	45	1	1	0	4	1	—		50	2
Preston North End (loan)	Total		61	1	1	0	4	1	—		66	2
Schalke 04 (loan)	2022–23	Bundesliga	9	1	0	0	—		—		9	1
Mainz 05 (loan)	2023–24	Bundesliga	33	3	2	0	—		—		35	3
Brentford	2024–25	Premier League	31	0	1	0	3	0	—		35	0
Brentford	2025–26	Premier League	32	0	2	0	4	0	—		38	0
Brentford	Total		63	0	3	0	7	0	—		73	0
Total			188	5	8	0	14	1	0	0	210	6

== Honours ==
Liverpool

- FIFA Club World Cup: 2019
