= Daniel Johnson (footballer) =

Jamaican footballer (born 1992)

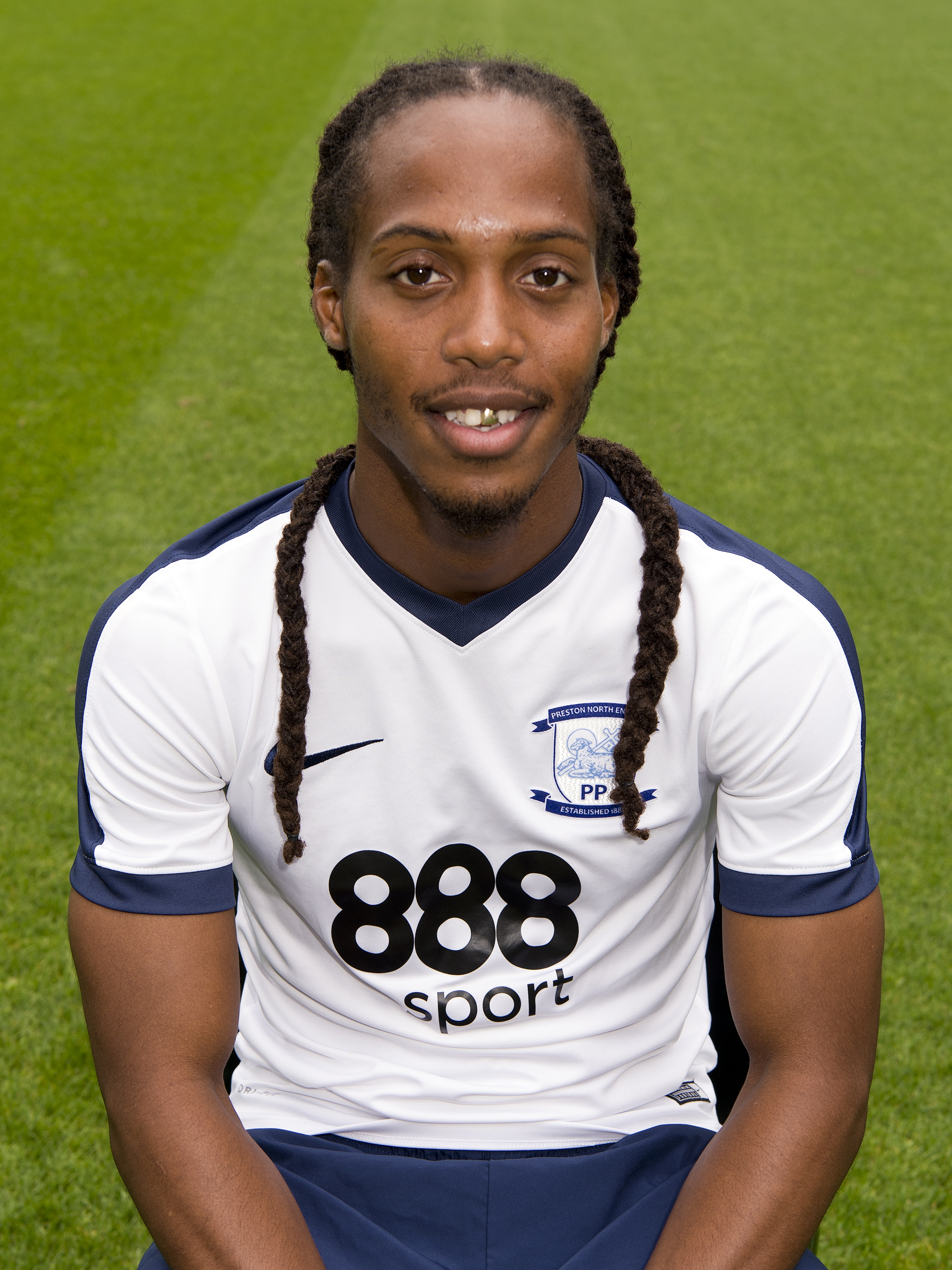
- Johnson with Preston North End in 2016

Personal information
- Full name: Daniel Anthony Johnson
- Date of birth: 8 October 1992 (age 34)
- Place of birth: Kingston, Jamaica
- Height: 1.74 m (5 ft 9 in)
- Position: Attacking midfielder

Team information
- Current team: Barnsley
- Number: 14

Youth career
- 2007–2009: Crystal Palace
- 2009–2011: Aston Villa

Senior career*
Years	Team	Apps	(Gls)
2011–2015	Aston Villa	0	(0)
2012	→ Yeovil Town (loan)	5	(0)
2014	→ Chesterfield (loan)	11	(0)
2014–2015	→ Oldham Athletic (loan)	6	(3)
2015–2023	Preston North End	312	(53)
2023–2024	Stoke City	27	(2)
2024–2026	Fatih Karagümrük	48	(3)
2026–	Barnsley	0	(0)

International career^{‡}
2020–	Jamaica	26	(3)
Medal record
Men's football
Representing Jamaica
CONCACAF Nations League
Bronze medal – third place	2024 United States	Team
- * Club domestic league appearances and goals as of 10 June 2026 ‡ National team caps and goals as of 01:18, 10 June 2024 (UTC)

Daniel Anthony Johnson (born 8 October 1992) is a Jamaican professional footballer who currently plays for EFL League One club Barnsley and represents the Jamaica national team.

Johnson began his career with Aston Villa and after loan spells at Yeovil Town, Chesterfield and Oldham Athletic he joined Preston North End in January 2015 on a permanent transfer. He spent eight and a half years at Deepdale making 336 appearances, scoring 57 goals before joining Stoke City in July 2023.

== Career ==
=== Aston Villa ===
Born in Jamaica, Johnson moved with his family to London aged seven and played for Crystal Palace's academy as a schoolboy before moving on to Aston Villa's academy in 2009. Johnson was called up to Aston Villa's first team for the first time, where he was an unused substitute in Villa's 2–1 League Cup win over Burnley on 27 October 2010. In January 2011, Johnson signed his first professional contract at Villa Park. In March 2012, he extended his contract to summer 2013. In June 2013, Johnson signed a new two-year deal keeping him at the club until 2015, despite still awaiting his first team breakthrough.

Johnson joined League One side Yeovil Town on 23 October 2012 on a month-long youth loan deal, and made his Football League debut as a substitute that evening in Yeovil's 3–1 victory over Shrewsbury Town. Johnson made five appearances for the Glovers before his loan was cut short a week early by manager Gary Johnson. Johnson joined Chesterfield on a three-month loan in August 2014 and made his debut in a 2–1 away win over Port Vale on 30 August. Johnson played 13 times for Chesterfield before returning to Villa. On 10 November 2014, Johnson joined another League One side, Oldham, on a two-month deal until 5 January 2015. Johnson scored his first senior goal on his debut in a 1–1 draw against Crawley Town. He also scored twice against local rivals Rochdale in a 3–0 victory.

=== Preston North End ===
Johnson joined Preston North End on 23 January 2015 for an undisclosed fee, believed to be £50,000, on a two-and-a-half-year contract. Johnson started life off well at Preston scoring 8 goals in 18 appearances as Preston finished the 2014–15 season in third missing out on automatic promotion on the final day of the season. They progressed past Chesterfield in the League One play-offs semi-final before comfortably beating Swindon Town 4–0 in the final to gain promotion to the Championship. Johnson was a regular in his first season playing in the second-tier making 44 appearances, scoring nine goals as North End finished in 11th position. Johnson signed a new two-year contract extension with Preston in August 2016. He made the same number of appearances in 2016–17, scoring four goals including twice against Lancashire rivals Blackburn Rovers on 10 December 2016. Preston again finished the season in 11th place. Johnson played 36 times in 2017–18 as the Lilywhites missed out on a play-off spot on the final day of the season.

Johnson agreed a two-year contract extension with Preston in August 2018. In 2018–19 under the management of Alex Neil, Preston were unable to push for a top half finish ending the campaign in 14th. Johnson scored a career best of 12 goals in 2019–20, finishing top scorer as Preston ended up four points shy of a play-off spot in ninth. Johnson signed another contract extension in January 2021 keeping him at Deepdale until the summer of 2023. The 2020–21 season was a frustrating one for North End as they were unable to put a consistent run of results together and finished in 13th. They ended the 2021–22 season again in 13th place with Johnson making 45 appearances, scoring eight goals. In his eighth and final season at Preston, Johnson played 38 times, scoring once in another mid-table finish.

Preston announced on 27 June 2023 that Johnson would be leaving the club at the end of his contract after eight years at the club after making a total of 336 appearances, scoring 57 goals. Manager Ryan Lowe stated he was disappointed that Johnson had decided to leave for a new challenge— "We're disappointed but DJ wants a new challenge. I had a fantastic relationship with DJ and all the players did and I'm sure all the fans did too, but sometimes people want fresh challenges and that's what DJ's told us he wants to do, and we have to respect that decision. He'll go down as a legend at the football club and rightly so because he's a very talented footballer".

=== Stoke City ===
Johnson joined Stoke City on 19 July 2023 signing on a two-year deal, reuniting with manager Alex Neil. He scored his first goal for Stoke in a 2–2 draw with Huddersfield Town on 20 September 2023. Neil was sacked in December 2023 and replaced by Steven Schumacher and after Johnson missed a penalty away at Blackburn Rovers in February 2024 he did not play again for the remainder of the 2023–24 season. Johnson terminated his contract with Stoke by mutual consent on 29 August 2024.

=== Fatih Karagümrük ===
On 3 September 2024, Johnson joined TFF First League club Fatih Karagümrük.

=== Barnsley ===
On 9 October 2026, Johnson signed for EFL League One side Barnsley on a free transfer.

== International career ==
In June 2019, Johnson received an invite to play for the Jamaica national side for the CONCACAF Gold Cup in July 2019. On 31 August 2019, he was called up for Jamaica's CONCACAF Nations League matches against Antigua and Barbuda and Guyana. However, on 5 September, Johnson withdrew from the squad, with his agent citing a lack of a direct flight from London to Montego Bay. He debuted with the Jamaica national team in a 3–0 friendly loss to Saudi Arabia on 14 November 2020. He has now been released and is a free agent in 2026.

== Career statistics ==
=== Club ===
As of match played 13 August 2024

Appearances and goals by club, season and competition
Club	Season	League			FA Cup		League Cup		Other		Total	
Club	Season	Division	Apps	Goals	Apps	Goals	Apps	Goals	Apps	Goals	Apps	Goals
Aston Villa	2012–13	Premier League	0	0	0	0	0	0	—		0	0
Aston Villa	2013–14	Premier League	0	0	0	0	0	0	—		0	0
Aston Villa	2014–15	Premier League	0	0	0	0	0	0	—		0	0
Aston Villa	Total		0	0	0	0	0	0	—		0	0
Yeovil Town (loan)	2012–13	League One	5	0	0	0	0	0	0	0	5	0
Chesterfield (loan)	2014–15	League One	11	0	0	0	1	0	1 (Note: Appearance in Football League Trophy)	0	13	0
Oldham Athletic (loan)	2014–15	League One	6	3	1	0	0	0	0	0	7	3
Preston North End	2014–15	League One	20	8	0	0	0	0	3 (Note: Appearances in the League One play-offs)	0	23	8
Preston North End	2015–16	Championship	43	8	0	0	1	1	—		44	9
Preston North End	2016–17	Championship	40	4	1	0	3	0	—		44	4
Preston North End	2017–18	Championship	33	3	2	0	1	0	—		36	3
Preston North End	2018–19	Championship	35	6	1	0	2	1	—		38	7
Preston North End	2019–20	Championship	33	12	0	0	1	0	—		34	12
Preston North End	2020–21	Championship	33	4	0	0	1	1	—		34	5
Preston North End	2021–22	Championship	41	7	1	1	3	0	—		45	8
Preston North End	2022–23	Championship	34	1	2	0	2	0	—		38	1
Preston North End	Total		312	53	7	1	14	3	3	0	336	57
Stoke City	2023–24	Championship	26	2	1	0	2	0	—		29	2
Stoke City	2024–25	Championship	1	0	0	0	1	0	—		2	0
Stoke City	Total		27	2	1	0	3	0	—		31	2
Career total			361	58	9	1	18	3	4	0	392	62

=== International ===
As of match played 9 June 2024

Appearances and goals by national team and year
National team	Year	Apps	Goals
Jamaica
Jamaica	2020	2	1
Jamaica	2021	5	0
Jamaica	2022	4	1
Jamaica	2023	14	1
Jamaica	2024	3	0
Total		26	3

==== International goals ====
As of match played 2 July 2023. Scores and results list Jamaica's goal tally first, score column indicates score after each Johnson goal.

List of international goals scored by Daniel Johnson
No.	Date	Venue	Opponent	Score	Result	Competition
1	17 November 2020	Prince Faisal bin Fahd Stadium, Riyadh, Saudi Arabia	Saudi Arabia	1–1	2–1	Friendly
2	27 January 2022	Independence Park, Kingston, Jamaica	Mexico	1–0	1–2	2022 FIFA World Cup qualification
3	2 July 2023	Levi's Stadium, Santa Clara, United States	Saint Kitts and Nevis	4–0	5–0	2023 CONCACAF Gold Cup

== Honours ==
Preston North End

- Football League One play-offs: 2015

Individual

- North West Football Awards Championship Player of the Year: 2020
- Preston North End Player of the Year: 2019–20
