= James McCarten =

English footballer

Personal information
- Full name: James Phillip McCarten
- Date of birth: 8 November 1990 (age 35)
- Place of birth: Netherton, England
- Position: Defender

Youth career
- Everton

Senior career*
Years	Team	Apps	(Gls)
2008–2010	Everton	0	(0)
2010	→ Accrington Stanley (loan)	1	(0)
2010–2012	Aberystwyth Town	56	(5)
2012–2019	Warrington Town		
2019	→ Bamber Bridge (loan)		
2019–2021	City of Liverpool		
2021–2023	Bootle	73	(0)
- * Club domestic league appearances and goals as of 01:35, 23 November 2025 (UTC)

James Phillip McCarten (born 8 November 1990) is an English semi-professional footballer who plays as a defender.

== Career ==
McCarten was born in Netherton, Merseyside. He began his career as a youth player at Everton and was named Everton under-18's player of the year for the 2008–09 season. Academy manager Ray Hall described McCarten as "the type of player a young boy should look up to". In March 2010, he joined Football League Two side Accrington Stanley on a short-term loan deal, making one appearance during a 3–2 defeat to Grimsby Town.

Released by Everton on his return, McCarten signed for Welsh Premier League side Aberystwyth Town. He made a total of 55 appearances for the club.

On 8 February 2019, McCarten was loaned out from Warrington Town to Bamber Bridge to get back to full fitness after an injury.

On 20 March 2019, he then joined City of Liverpool FC on a dual registration. He later played for Bootle.
