= Ethan Walker =

English footballer (born 2002)

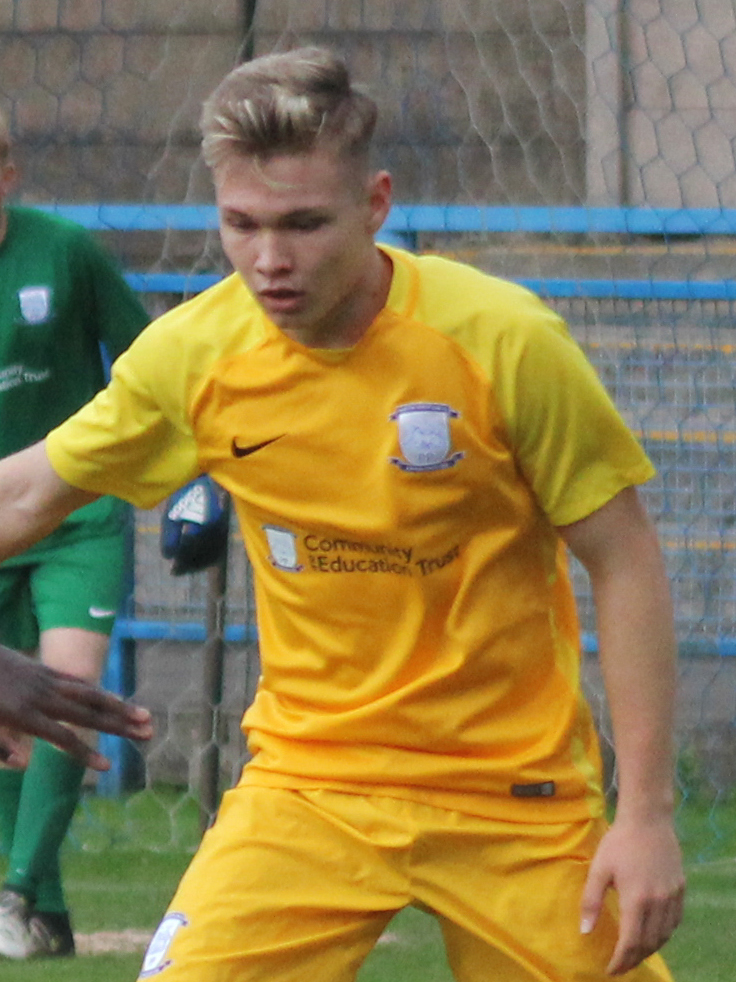
- Walker with Preston North End U18 in October 2017

Personal information
- Full name: Glenn Ethan Walker
- Date of birth: 28 July 2002 (age 24)
- Place of birth: Preston, England
- Position: Winger

Team information
- Current team: Ayr United
- Number: 21

Youth career
- –2018: Preston North End

Senior career*
Years	Team	Apps	(Gls)
2018–2022	Preston North End	1	(0)
2019–2020	→ Altrincham (loan)	2	(0)
2020	→ Stalybridge Celtic (loan)	4	(0)
2020–2021	→ Carlisle United (loan)	16	(0)
2021–2022	→ AFC Fylde (loan)	7	(1)
2022–2024	Blackburn Rovers	0	(0)
2023–2024	→ Morecambe (loan)	8	(1)
2024	→ Oldham Athletic (loan)	3	(0)
2024–	Ayr United	39	(8)
- * Club domestic league appearances and goals as of 4 May 2026

Glenn Ethan Walker (born 28 July 2002) is an English professional footballer who plays as a winger for Scottish Championship club Ayr United.

== Club career ==
=== Preston North End ===
Walker signed his first professional contract in October 2018 and in December 2018, he became the youngest player to appear in a league game for Preston North End when he came on a substitute in a 1–1 draw against Aston Villa at the age of 16 years and 156 days.

On 12 December 2019, Walker joined Altrincham F.C. on loan for the rest of the 2019–20 season. He was still available to play for Preston's youth team's during his loan spell at Altrincham. However, he was recalled on 14 January 2020 and later on the same month, he joined Stalybridge Celtic on loan instead, until the end of the season along with fellow Preston teammate Adam O'Reilly.

On 12 September 2020, Walker joined League Two Carlisle United on a season-long loan. After appearing in four league games for the Cumbrians, Walker was recalled by his parent club Preston North End on 8 January 2021.

In September 2021, he joined National League North side AFC Fylde on loan for a month. He returned to Preston after only two games due to injury, but re-joined the Coasters in November until January 2022. Walker was released at the end of the 2021–22 season.

=== Blackburn Rovers ===
On 30 May 2022, it was announced that Walker had signed for Blackburn Rovers on a two-year deal.

Playing for Rovers' youth team as a striker, in his first twelve months at Ewood Park he scored seven goals in 19 appearances.

On 1 September 2023, it was announced that Walker had joined Morecambe on loan for the 2023–24 season. On 2 January 2024, it was announced Walker had been recalled from his spell at Morecambe & had joined Oldham Athletic on loan for the remainder of the season.

On 18 May 2024, it was confirmed Walker will be leaving the club at the end of his contract.

=== Ayr United ===
On 18 June 2024, it was announced Walker will join Ayr United on 1 July when his contract at Blackburn Rovers expires.

== Career statistics ==
As of match played 21 August 2022

Appearances and goals by club, season and competition
Club	Season	League			FA Cup		League Cup		Other		Total	
Club	Season	Division	Apps	Goals	Apps	Goals	Apps	Goals	Apps	Goals	Apps	Goals
Preston North End	2018–19	Championship	1	0	0	0	0	0	0	0	1	0
Preston North End	2019–20	Championship	0	0	0	0	1	0	0	0	1	0
Preston North End	2020–21	Championship	0	0	0	0	0	0	0	0	0	0
Preston North End	2021–22	Championship	0	0	0	0	0	0	0	0	0	0
Preston North End	Total		1	0	0	0	1	0	0	0	2	0
Altrincham (loan)	2019–20	National League North	2	0	0	0	0	0	2 (Note: Appearances in FA Trophy)	0	4	0
Stalybridge Celtic (loan)	2019–20	Northern Premier League	4	0	0	0	1	0	0	0	5	0
Carlisle United (loan)	2020–21	League Two	16	0	0	0	0	0	1 (Note: Appearances in EFL Trophy)	0	17	0
AFC Fylde (loan)	2021–22	National League North	7	1	0	0	0	0	2	0	9	1
Career total			30	1	0	0	2	0	5	0	37	1
