= Joe Rafferty =

Irish footballer (born 1993)

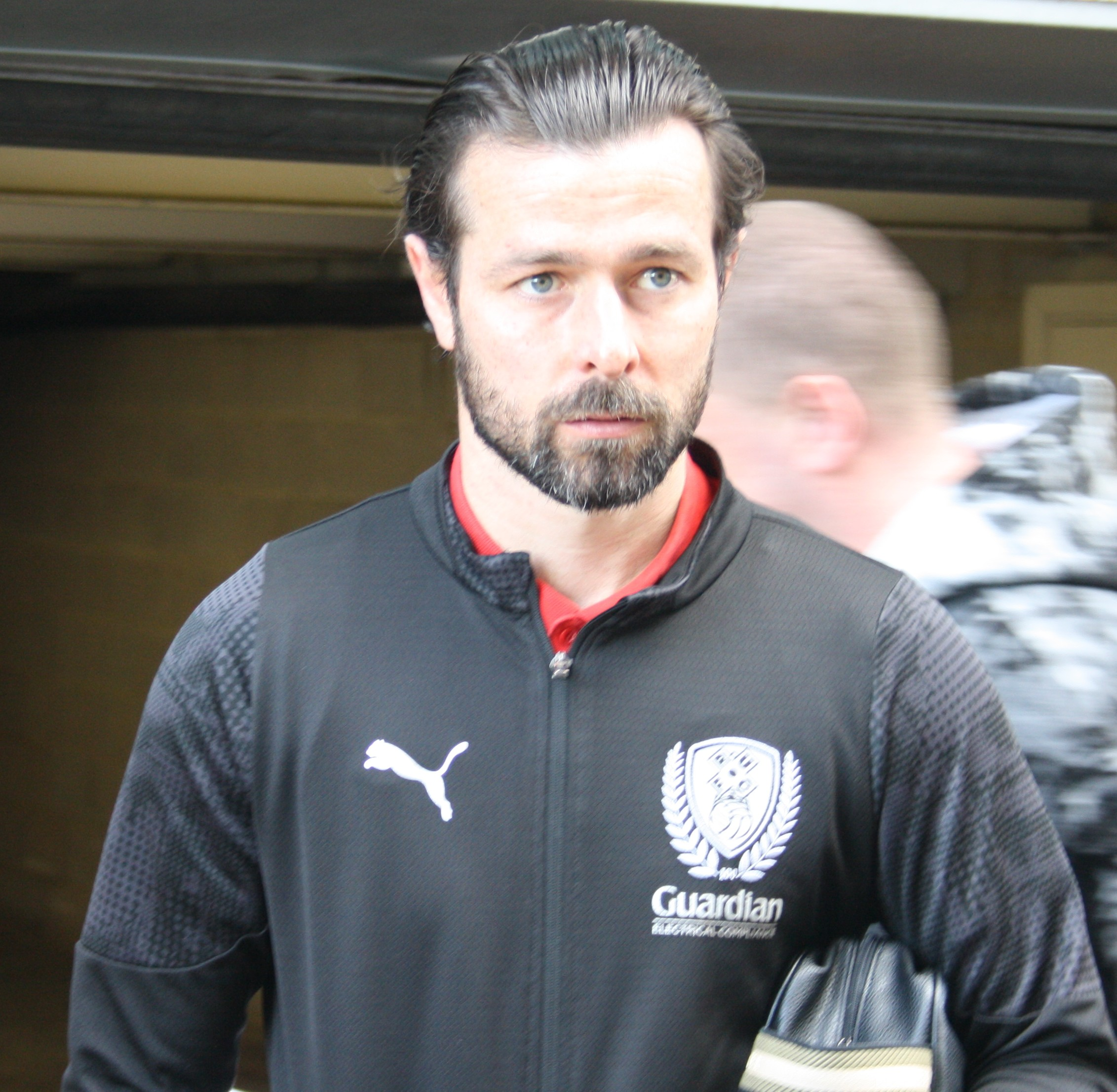
- Rafferty in 2026

Personal information
- Full name: Joseph Gerard Rafferty
- Date of birth: 6 October 1993 (age 33)
- Place of birth: Liverpool, England
- Height: 1.80 m (5 ft 11 in)
- Position: Defender

Team information
- Current team: Rotherham United
- Number: 2

Youth career
- 2003–2012: Liverpool

Senior career*
Years	Team	Apps	(Gls)
2012–2019	Rochdale	214	(3)
2019–2022	Preston North End	61	(1)
2022–2024	Portsmouth	64	(0)
2024–	Rotherham United	81	(4)

International career^{‡}
2010–2011	Republic of Ireland U18	3	(0)
2011	Republic of Ireland U19	1	(0)
- * Club domestic league appearances and goals as of 2 May 2026(UTC) ‡ National team caps and goals as of 18:09, 26 October 2013 (UTC)

Joseph Gerard Rafferty (born 6 October 1993) is a professional footballer who plays for EFL League Two club Rotherham United.

Rafferty can operate as a fullback, wingback and as a midfielder. Born in England, he has represented the Republic of Ireland at youth level. He was born and raised in the city of Liverpool where he started his footballing career. Rafferty has played internationally for the Republic of Ireland three times at under-18 and once at under-19 level.

== Club career ==
=== Liverpool ===
Rafferty spent his youth career with Liverpool, and in 2011 was made captain of the Under-18 side. Whilst at Liverpool he was capped by the Republic of Ireland at Under 18 level making his debut in 2010 in the Jerez tournament against Czech Republic in Prague. The following season Rafferty represented Republic of Ireland at Under 19 levels.

=== Rochdale ===
He joined Football League Two side Rochdale on 2 July 2012. On 4 September 2012 Rafferty made his first-team debut for Rochdale in the Football League Trophy against Fleetwood Town coming on as an 82nd-minute substitute for Brian Barry-Murphy. On 16 May 2013 Rafferty signed a new 1-year contract at Rochdale. on 8 October 2013 Rafferty scored his first professional goal with a header against Port Vale in the Football League Trophy.

On 26 April 2014 Rafferty was part of the Rochdale team which won promotion to League One. On 1 July 2014, Rafferty agreed a new two-year contract extending his stay at Spotland until May 2016.

At the end of the 2016–17 season, Rochdale AFC confirmed Rafferty had signed a new two-year deal with the club. At the end of season awards Rafferty won both the Rochdale supporters player of the year and the SMAC Dale supporters club player of the year.

=== Preston North End ===
On 23 January 2019 Rafferty joined Preston North End on a three-and-a-half-year deal for an undisclosed fee. Rafferty scored his first goal for the club away at Swansea on 17 August 2019.

Rafferty was released at the end of the 2021–22 season.

=== Portsmouth ===
On 11 July 2022, Rafferty joined League One club Portsmouth on a two-year deal. In the 2023–24 season, Rafferty made 42 appearances as the club were crowned as champions of the division. On 1 May 2024 the club said the player would be released in the summer when his contract expired.

=== Rotherham United ===
On 20 May 2024, it was announced that Rafferty would sign for newly relegated League One side Rotherham United on a two-year deal.

On 27 July 2025, Manager Matt Hamshaw named Rafferty as Rotherham's Club Captain for the coming season.

On 8 May 2026 Rotherham announced it was extending the player's contract.

== Career statistics ==
As of match played 27 April 2024

Appearances and goals by club, season and competition
Club	Season	League			FA Cup		League Cup		Other		Total	
Club	Season	Division	Apps	Goals	Apps	Goals	Apps	Goals	Apps	Goals	Apps	Goals
Rochdale	2012–13	League Two	21	0	0	0	0	0	2 (Note: Appearances in Football League Trophy)	0	23	0
Rochdale	2013–14	League Two	31	0	1	0	1	0	1	1	34	1
Rochdale	2014–15	League One	31	1	5	0	1	0	2	0	39	1
Rochdale	2015–16	League One	31	1	0	0	2	0	0	0	33	1
Rochdale	2016–17	League One	40	0	5	0	2	0	3 (Note: Appearances in EFL Trophy)	0	50	0
Rochdale	2017–18	League One	33	1	6	0	2	0	4	0	45	1
Rochdale	2018–19	League One	27	0	2	0	2	0	2	1	33	1
Rochdale	Total		214	3	19	0	10	0	14	2	257	5
Preston North End	2018–19	Championship	6	0	0	0	0	0	0	0	6	0
Preston North End	2019–20	Championship	29	1	1	0	3	0	0	0	33	1
Preston North End	2020–21	Championship	21	0	1	0	3	0	0	0	25	0
Preston North End	2021–22	Championship	5	0	0	0	3	1	0	0	8	1
Preston North End	Total		61	1	2	0	9	1	0	0	72	2
Portsmouth	2022–23	League One	25	0	0	0	1	0	0	0	26	0
Portsmouth	2023–24	League One	39	0	1	0	0	0	2	0	42	0
Portsmouth	Total		64	0	1	0	1	0	2	0	68	0
Career total			339	4	22	0	20	1	16	2	397	7

== Honours ==
Portsmouth

- EFL League One: 2023–24

Individual

- Rochdale Player of the Year: 2016–17
