= Emil Riis =

Danish footballer (born 1998)

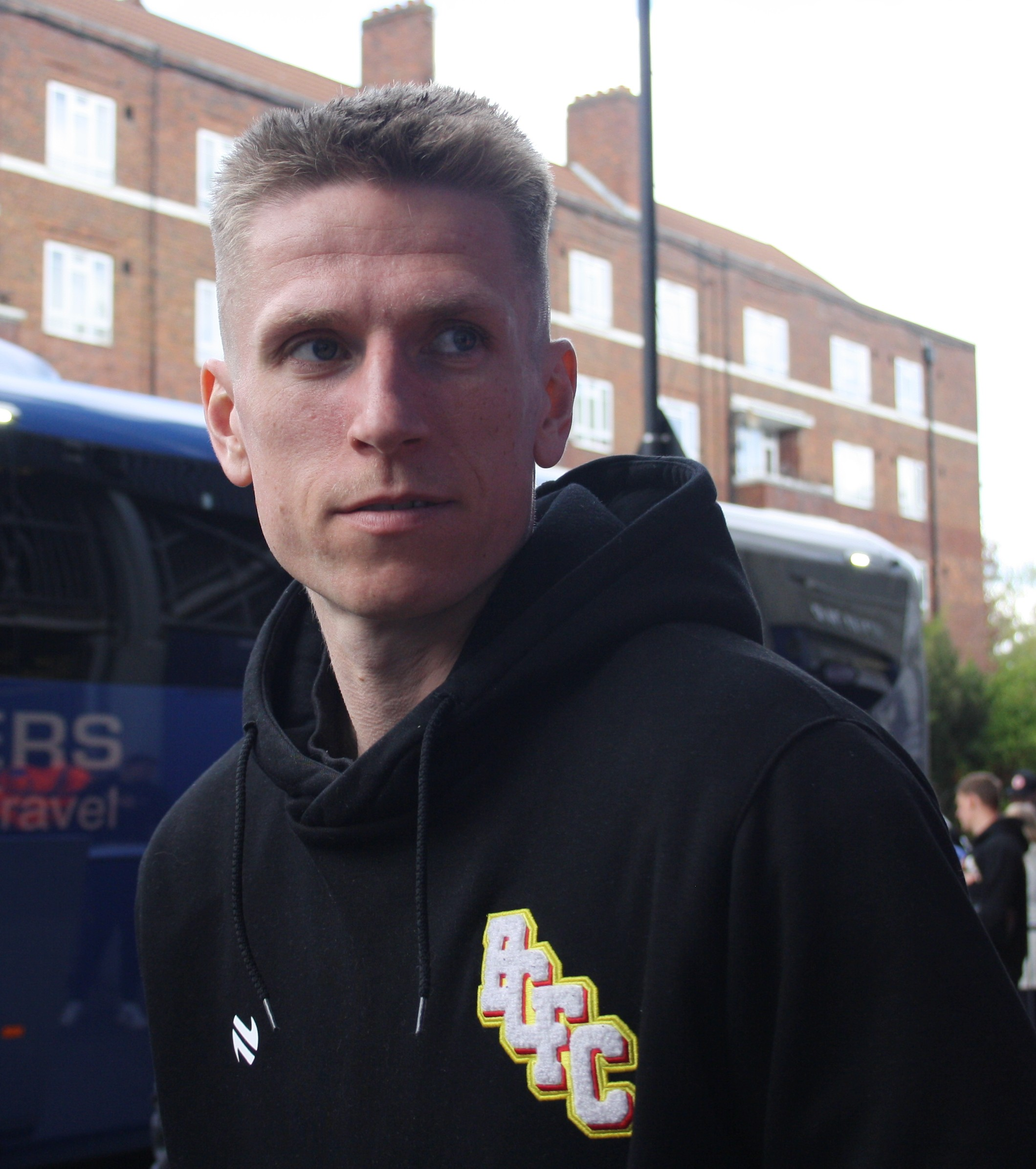
- Riis in 2026

Personal information
- Full name: Emil Riis Jakobsen
- Date of birth: 24 June 1998 (age 28)
- Place of birth: Hobro, Denmark
- Height: 1.90 m (6 ft 3 in)
- Position: Forward

Team information
- Current team: Leicester City
- Number: 17

Youth career
- Randers
- 2015–2018: Derby County

Senior career*
Years	Team	Apps	(Gls)
2018	Derby County	0	(0)
2018	→ VVV-Venlo (loan)	3	(0)
2018–2020	Randers	59	(14)
2020–2025	Preston North End	172	(41)
2025–2026	Bristol City	44	(9)
2026–	Leicester City	8	(6)

International career
2013–2014	Denmark U16	6	(1)
2014	Denmark U17	2	(0)
2017	Denmark U19	2	(1)
2018	Denmark U20	1	(1)
2020	Denmark U21	5	(1)
- * Club domestic league appearances and goals as of 22:17, 27 October 2026 (UTC)

Emil Riis Jakobsen (born 24 June 1998) is a Danish professional footballer who plays as a forward for EFL League One club Leicester City.

== Club career ==
=== Early years ===
Riis joined the youth academy of Randers at the age of 14. He went on to become the top-scorer of the under-17 team by scoring 24 goals in the youth league. After two trials, he joined the youth team of English club Derby County in July 2015. After joining the club, he was assigned to the under-18 team. He further progressed on to play for the under-23 team and scored 11 goals as his side gained the Premier League 2 Division 1 status.

In December 2017, Riis trialled with Dutch club VVV-Venlo. On 11 January 2018, he joined the club on a loan deal till the end of the season. He made his debut on 17 March 2018, where he came on as a 68th-minute substitute for Romeo Castelen in a 3–0 away loss to PSV. He made two more appearances in the Eredivisie during the spring.

=== Randers ===
On 13 June 2018, it was announced that Riis would return to Randers FC, where he signed a three-year contract. In the 2018–19 season, his first season in the top Danish Superliga, he played regularly, but was not always a starter. During the season, Riis also made appearances for the reserve team. After 19 appearances for the first team, in which he scored three goals, Randers finished in eighth place of the league table during the regular season, and thereby qualified for Group 2 in the relegation round, in which the club made play-offs for European football as group winners. Riis was utilised in all matches and scored the 1–0 winner in a game against Hobro IK. In the play-offs, Randers reached the third and decisive qualifying round, where they eventually lost 4–2 to Brøndby who qualified for UEFA Europa League participation.

In the 2019–20 season, Riis was able to establish himself in the starting lineup. In the regular season, he scored 5 goals in 29 appearances. Randers ended in 7th place and again qualified for the relegation round, in which Riis scored three goals and again helped his club to European play-offs. There, Randers were knocked out by OB (2–1; 0–2).

=== Preston North End ===
On 1 October 2020, Riis signed a four-year contract with English Championship club Preston North End for an undisclosed fee, believed to be around DKK 10 million. He scored his first goal for the club in a 3–0 win over Reading on 4 November 2020.

Riis started the 2021–22 season in fine form, scoring five goals in all competitions during August. His goalscoring form continued, scoring 16 goals in all competitions by the end of January 2022, including an audacious 96th minute equalising volley against Bristol City on 29 January 2022, winning further plaudits for his goalscoring ability.

On 9 May 2025, Preston announced that the player would be leaving in June when his contract expired.

=== Bristol City ===
On 1 July 2025, Riis joined Bristol City on a free transfer on a three-year deal. On 9 August, he made his league debut for the club in a 4–1 win against Sheffield United. On 10 January 2026, Riis scored a hat trick in a 5–1 victory over Watford in the third round of the FA Cup.

=== Leicester City ===
On 1 September 2026, Riis signed a four-year contract with Leicester City for an undisclosed fee. He scored his first two goals for the club in their dramatic 3-4 win away at Stockport County on 12 September 2026.

== International career ==
Riis has been capped by the Denmark under-16, under-17 and under-21 team.

He was called up to the senior Denmark squad for the 2022 FIFA World Cup qualification matches against the Faroe Islands and Scotland on 12 and 15 November 2021, respectively. He was on the bench against Scotland.

== Career statistics ==
=== Club ===
As of 27 October 2026

Appearances and goals by club, season and competition
Club	Season	League			National cup (Note: Includes KNVB Cup, Danish Cup, FA Cup)		League cup (Note: Includes EFL Cup)		Other		Total	
Club	Season	Division	Apps	Goals	Apps	Goals	Apps	Goals	Apps	Goals	Apps	Goals
VVV-Venlo (loan)	2017–18	Eredivisie	3	0	0	0	—		—		3	0
Randers	2018–19	Danish Superliga	25	4	2	1	—		5 (Note: Appearances in Superliga European play-offs)	0	32	5
Randers	2019–20	Danish Superliga	31	8	4	2	—		2	1	37	11
Randers	2020–21	Danish Superliga	3	2	0	0	—		—		3	2
Randers	Total		59	14	6	3	—		7	1	72	18
Preston North End	2020–21	Championship	38	2	1	1	0	0	—		39	3
Preston North End	2021–22	Championship	44	16	1	0	4	4	—		49	20
Preston North End	2022–23	Championship	24	5	0	0	2	0	—		26	5
Preston North End	2023–24	Championship	21	6	1	0	0	0	—		22	6
Preston North End	2024–25	Championship	45	12	3	0	2	0	—		50	12
Preston North End	Total		172	41	6	1	8	4	—		186	46
Bristol City	2025–26	Championship	44	9	2	3	1	0	—		47	12
Leicester City	2026–27	League One	8	6	0	0	—		1 (Note: Appearance in EFL Trophy)	1	9	7
Career total			286	70	14	7	9	4	8	2	317	83
