= Warrington Town F.C. =

English football club

Coordinates: 53°22′37.290″N 2°34′11.741″W

Warrington Town
- Full name: Warrington Town Football Club
- Nicknames: The Yellows, The Town, The Wire
- Founded: 1949; 77 years ago (as Stockton Heath)
- Ground: Cantilever Park, Warrington
- Capacity: 3,094
- Chairman: Toby Macormac
- Manager: Paul Carden
- League: Northern Premier League Premier Division
- 2024-25: National League North, 23rd out of 24 (relegated)
- Website: warringtontownfc.co.uk
Home colours	Away colours

Warrington Town Football Club is an association football club based in Warrington, Cheshire. They were established in 1949 under the name of Stockton Heath, adopting their current name in 1961. They currently compete in the Northern Premier League Premier Division and play at Cantilever Park.

== Club history ==
=== First 50 years ===
Formed in 1949 by Jimmy Drinkwater, the club was initially named Stockton Heath Albion and competed in the Warrington and District League until 1953, when they moved to the Mid Cheshire League. Freddie Worrall became manager at the same time, and during a 13-year spell in charge, the club won the league in 1959–60, plus the League Cup in three consecutive seasons during the 1950s. During his thirteen years at the helm, Heath were one of the most feared sides in Cheshire football, winning a string of honours including the Mid Cheshire League Championship in 1959–60, the League Cup in 1953–54, 1954–55, 1955–56 and made several appearances in the Cheshire Amateur Cup Final. Several players from this successful period went on to join Football League clubs, including Ian Weir, John Green, Alan Foster and Roger Hunt, later a World Cup winner with England in 1966.

At the club's 1961 AGM, it was decided to change the name to Warrington Town. In 1978, the club were founder members of Division Two of the Cheshire County League. When it merged into the North West Counties Football League in 1982, the club were founder members of Division Three. They finished as runners-up in the first season, earning promotion to Division Two. In 1985–86, Warrington reached the semi-finals of the FA Vase, losing 6–3 to Halesowen Town in a replay. After finishing as runners-up in Division Two in 1986–87, the club were promoted to Division One. In the same season they reached the FA Vase final, where they lost 3–2 to local rivals St Helens Town

In 1989–90, Warrington Town won Division One, and were promoted to the Northern Premier League. In 1992–93, they reached the quarter-finals of the FA Trophy, eventually losing 2–1 at Sutton United, and also became the first Division One club to reach the final of the League Cup, losing on penalties to Winsford United. The season also saw the club sell Neil Whalley to Football League Third Division side Preston North End for £25,000, equalling the record fee paid for a Northern Premier League player. A few weeks later Warrington also sold Liam Watson to Preston for a record £60,000.

After finishing second bottom of the league in 1996–97, the club were relegated back to Division One of the North West Counties League. The following season they were demoted, failing ground grading. In the 1998–99 season, teenage striker Damien Whitehead set a new club record of 52 goals in just 42 appearances, before signing for Football League Division Three side Macclesfield Town at the end of the season.

=== 21st century ===
The 1999–2000 season saw Town win the Second Division Trophy beating Tetley Walker 2–0 at Prescot Cables, with two goals from Neal Holden. The following season they won Division Two and were promoted back to Division One. They finished fifth in 2003–04, and were moved to Division One of the Northern Premier League as part of the restructuring that led to the creation of the Conference North and Conference South. When Division One was split into northern and southern sections in 2007, the club were placed in the southern division, but were moved to the northern section the following season.

In 2013–14 the club finished third in Division One North, qualifying for the promotion play-offs, where, they lost 1–0 at home to Bamber Bridge in the semi-finals. Former Director of Football, Toby Macormac, became the new club chairman and took the club from strength to strength and started by reaching the first round proper of the FA Cup for the first time in their history in 2014–15, where they beat League Two club Exeter City 1–0 with a 7th-minute header from Craig Robinson, in a giant-killing at Cantilever Park shown live on BBC Two. In the second round they lost 0–2 at Gateshead, televised live on BT Sport. Later in the season the club lifted its first trophy in 14 years by defeating Farsley Celtic on penalties in the final of the Northern Premier League Challenge Cup, held at Edgeley Park. In August 2014, the club unveiled its current club badge following a design competition, replacing the previous design based on the town's crest.

During the 2015–16 season the club set many new club records including scoring over 100 league goals and also winning over 30 league games in one season. Attendances at the club increased with a seasons average of 418 per game, including two crowds of over 1,000 for the games against Northwich Victoria and Prescot Cables. The Club Chairman decided to part company with manager Shaun Reid by mutual consent in February 2016, replacing him with Stuart Mellish and Lee Smith. Mellish and Smith led Town to the league title, finishing 15 points clear and setting division records of 106 points and 121 goals scored, and gaining promotion to Northern Premier League Premier Division. Team captain Ciaran Kilheeney was the top scorer in all 3 NPL divisions with 37 league goals, and he, James McCarten and goalkeeper Karl Wills were named in the NPL Division One North team of the season.

==== NPL Premier Division ====
At level seven in the English football league system, the Northern Premier League Premier Division was the highest level that Warrington had ever reached. After 16 games of the 2016–17 season, while sixth in the table, management duo of Stuart Mellish and Lee Smith left by mutual consent and Chairman Macornac brought in Paul Carden. Carden lead the team to a tenth-place finish in their first season in the division. In the 2017–18 Northern Premier League season Warrington improved on the previous campaign and ended up with a highest ever finish of third in the NPL Premier Division qualifying them for the play-offs, where they lost in a home semi-final against Grantham Town. They followed this up in 2018–19 with another third-placed finish, in a season made more complicated by the expulsion of North Ferriby United who went out of business partway through the campaign. In the play-offs Warrington beat Nantwich Town 4–1 in a home semi-final, and then won 2–1 against South Shields in the final. Normally this would have resulted in promotion to National League North. However, as a one-off for the 2018–19 season, Town had to play a "super playoff" game against the play-off winners of the newly-formed Southern League Premier Central Division. In this game Warrington lost 3–2 to King's Lynn Town after extra time, and they remained in the Northern Premier League Premier Division for the 2019–20 season.

As a result of the COVID-19 pandemic, the 2019–20 season was formally abandoned in March 2020, with all results from the season being expunged. After another abandoned season in 2020–21 and a play-off final defeat in 2021–22, Warrington finished the 2022–23 season as runners-up and were promoted to the National League North for the first time in club history, beating Bamber Bridge 1–0 in the play-off final at Cantilever Park.

==== National League North ====
Warrington started their first ever season in National League North with a 4-0 win away at Southport, and enjoyed a solid season, spent mainly in the top half of the table before eventually finishing 12th. They lost top goalscorer Isaac Buckley-Ricketts to Curzon Ashton in the summer and after a slow start to the following campaign, parted company with manager Mark Beesley. Former boss Carden returned from Nantwich Town, but Warrington would ultimately be relegated at the end of the 2024-25 campaign. The club posted its highest ever attendance for a regular season fixture, when 2,296 attended the home game against Chester, while the 4,432 crowd away at Scunthorpe United was the highest ever for a game involving the club, more than what turned up at Wembley for the 1987 FA Vase final.

== Current squad ==
As of 19 August 2026

Note: Flags indicate national team as defined under FIFA eligibility rules; some limited exceptions apply. Players may hold more than one non-FIFA nationality.

No.	Pos.	Nation	Player
—	GK	POL	Mateusz Hewelt
—	GK	ENG	Oliver Macormac
—	GK	ENG	Harry Roper
—	DF	WAL	Scott Butler
—	DF	ENG	Luke Burke
—	DF	NIR	Josh Doherty
—	DF	ENG	Chris Doyle
—	DF	ENG	Evan Gumbs
—	DF	ENG	Jayden Lloyd
—	DF	ENG	Harris McIntosh
—	DF	ENG	Alex McNally
—	MF	ENG	Bobby Bjork

No.	Pos.	Nation	Player
—	MF	ENG	Reece Daly
—	MF	ENG	Lewis Earl
—	MF	NIR	David Morgan
—	MF	ENG	Zayn Sadiq
—	MF	ENG	Josh Vela
—	FW	ENG	Josh Amis (captain)
—	FW	ENG	Ewan Bange
—	FW	ENG	Reuben Denton
—	FW	ENG	Ben Elliott
—	FW	ENG	Jack Goodwin
—	FW	ENG	Rio Hawkins
—	FW	ENG	Joe Rodwell-Grant

== Ground ==
The club played firstly at Stockton Lane in Stockton Heath in 1949, arriving at London Road in 1950, then moving to its first ground on Loushers lane (the Cheshire Police Ground) in 1953, returning to further down Stockton Lane in Grappenhall in 1955. The following year, the club moved to Cantilever Park, which had a capacity of just over 3,100 as of June 2026. It takes its name from the Cantilever Bridge, a high-level road bridge on Ackers Road over the Manchester Ship Canal that towers over the ground to the east. The ground itself is on the northern bank of the canal.

On the canal side is an all-seated main stand, with the clubhouse and dugouts on the opposite side, together with a small terraced stand that is at an angle showing where the pitch once was. Following developments in recent years, the Cantilever Bridge end of the ground now has two all-seater stands either side of the traditional covered terrace behind the goal. At the other end, there is a seated-stand and an open air terrace which can be serviced via its own turnstile and has food/drink and toilet facilities to facilitate segregation when required.

== Honours ==
- Northern Premier League
  - Northern Premier League play-off winners: 2019, 2023
  - Northern Premier League Division One North Champions: 2015–16
- Northern Premier League Challenge Cup
  - Winners: 2014–15
- North West Counties League
  - Division One Champions: 1989–90
  - Division Two Champions: 2000–01
  - Division Two Trophy winners: 1999–2000
  - League Cup winners: 1989–90
  - League Shield winners: 1985–86
- Mid-Cheshire League
  - Champions: 1960–61
  - League Cup Winners: 1953–54, 1954–55, 1955–56
- Northern Combination Cup
  - Winners: 1989–90
- Altrincham Cup
  - Winners: 1954–55
- Runcorn Challenge Cup
  - Winners: 1965–66, 1966–67, 1968–69
- Warrington Guardian Challenge Cup
  - Winners: 1980–81, 1994–95
- Raab Karcher Cup
  - Winners: 1987–88

== Records ==
- FA Cup
  - Second round: 2014–15
- FA Trophy
  - Quarter-finals 1992–93
- FA Vase
  - Runners-up 1986–87
- Record attendance: 2,550 v Bamber Bridge, Northern Premier League - Premier Division, play-off final, 1 May 2023
