= Bamber Bridge F.C. =

Association football club in England

Coordinates: 53°43′40″N 2°40′19″W

Bamber Bridge
- Full name: Bamber Bridge Football Club
- Nickname: Brig
- Founded: 1952
- Ground: Irongate, Bamber Bridge
- Capacity: 2,642 (499 seated)
- Chairman: Brian Ginty
- Manager: Vacant
- League: Northern Premier League Premier Division
- 2025–26: Northern Premier League Premier Division, 12th of 21
Home colours	Away colours

Bamber Bridge Football Club is a football club based in Bamber Bridge, near Preston, Lancashire, England. They are currently members of the Northern Premier League Premier Division and play at Irongate. The club is fully owned by a community organisation that represents supporters of the club.

== History ==
A Bamber Bridge club played in the late 19th century, but the modern club was established in 1952. The new club joined the Preston & District League, progressing to the Senior Division. In 1974 they merged with Walton-le-Dale, continuing in the Preston & District League. They went on to win the league's Guildhall Cup in 1978–79, before completing a Premier Division and cup double in 1980–81. After winning the Lancashire FA Amateur Shield in 1981–82 and another Guildhall Cup win in 1984–85, they won back-to-back Premier Division titles in the next two seasons, before winning a league and cup double in 1989–90.

In 1990 Bamber Bridge moved up to Division Two of the North West Counties League. Their second season in the league saw them win the division, resulting in promotion to Division One; they also reached the semi-finals of the FA Vase, where they lost 2–0 to Wimborne Town. After finishing as runners-up in Division One in the following season (1992–93), a second successive promotion was achieved when the club moved up to Division One of the Northern Premier League.

In 1994–95, a second-place finish saw Bamber Bridge promoted to the Premier Division, with the club also winning the league's Challenge Cup in their first season in the league and victory in the final of the Lancashire FA Challenge Trophy. The following season they won the Premier Division, which would have usually resulted in promotion to the Football Conference. However, Irongate was not deemed up to standard for the fifth tier, and the club remained in the Northern Premier League,

In 1999–2000 Bamber Bridge reached the first round of the FA Cup for the first time. After beating St Albans City 2–0, they lost 1–0 at Cambridge United in the second round. The club remained in the Premier Division until the end of the 2001–02 season, in which they finished bottom; although they beat Radcliffe Borough 3–2 in the promotion/relegation play-off semi-final, they were beaten 2–1 by Ashton United in the final.

Although Bamber Bridge returned to the Premier Division as a result of league restructuring following the creation of the Conference North and South, their stay was short-lived as they were relegated to Division One at the end of the 2004–05 season. However, the season did see them win the President's Cup. When the league added a third division in 2007, the club were placed in Division One North.

A fourth-place finish in 2013–14 saw Bamber Bridge qualify for the promotion play-offs. After beating Warrington Town 1–0 in the semi-finals, they lost 3–2 to Ramsbottom United in the final. In the following season they finished third, again qualifying for the play-offs, this time losing 2–0 to Darlington 1883 in the final after beating Northwich Victoria 2–1 in the semi-final. A fourth-place finish in 2017–18 saw the club reach the play-offs, in which they defeated Tadcaster Albion 2–1 in the semi-finals and Prescot Cables 1–0 in the final to earn promotion to the Premier Division. The club qualified for the play-offs again in 2022–23 after finishing third in the division; following a 5–4 win on penalties against Gainsborough Trinity in the semi-finals (after a 1–1 draw), they lost the final 1–0 to Warrington Town.

== Ground ==
Following the 1974 merger the club played at the King George's Playing Field. In 1983 they purchased a plot of derelict land to build their own ground, with the name Irongate taken from the local area. The first game was played in August 1987. It currently has a capacity of 2,642, of which 499 is seated.

The record attendance of 2,300 was set for a friendly match against the Czech Republic national team shortly before Euro 96, as the Czechs were using Irongate as a training ground; the result was a 9–1 win for the Czechs. The ground has also formerly hosted the home games of the Preston North End women's team and Blackburn Rovers Ladies (2016–2022).

== Honours ==
- Northern Premier League
  - Premier Division champions 1995–96
  - Challenge Cup winners 1994–94
  - President's Cup winners 2004–05
- North West Counties League
  - Division Two champions 1991–92
- Preston and District League
  - Premier Division champions 1980–81, 1985–86, 1986–87, 1989–90
  - Guildhall Cup winners 1978–79, 1980–81, 1984–85, 1989–90
- Lancashire FA Challenge Trophy
  - Winners 1994–95
- Lancashire FA Amateur Shield
  - Winners 1981–82
- Lancastrian Brigade Cup
  - Winners 1976–77, 1989–90, 1990–91
- Lytham Medal Competition
  - Winners 1975–76

== Records ==
- Best FA Cup performance: Second round, 1999–2000
- Best FA Trophy performance: Second round, 1994–95, 1996–97, 1998–99, 1999–2000
- Best FA Vase performance: Semi-finals, 1991–92
- Record attendance: 2,300 vs Czech Republic, friendly, 1996
- Record transfer fee received: £15,000 from Wigan Athletic for Tony Black, 1995
- Record transfer fee paid: £10,000 to Horwich RMI for Mark Edwards

== See also ==
- Bamber Bridge F.C. players
- Bamber Bridge F.C. managers
