= Cathal O'Sullivan =

Irish footballer

Personal information
- Full name: Cathal O'Sullivan
- Date of birth: 5 March 2007 (age 19)
- Place of birth: Cork, Ireland
- Height: 1.74 m (5 ft 9 in)
- Positions: Winger; attacking midfielder

Team information
- Current team: Preston North End

Youth career
- –2020: Leeside United
- 2020–2024: Cork City
- 2026-: Preston North End

Senior career*
Years	Team	Apps	(Gls)
2023–2025	Cork City	49	(7)
2026–	Preston North End	0	(0)

International career^{‡}
2021	Republic of Ireland U15	3	(1)
2023–2024	Republic of Ireland U17	5	(0)
2024	Republic of Ireland U19	8	(0)
2025–	Republic of Ireland U21	2	(0)
- * Club domestic league appearances and goals as of 17:22, 5 March 2026 (UTC) ‡ National team caps and goals as of 10:29, 12 June 2025 (UTC)

Cathal O'Sullivan (born 5 March 2007) is an Irish professional footballer who plays as a winger or attacking midfielder for EFL Championship club Preston North End.

== Career ==
=== Youth career ===
Cork man O'Sullivan attended Glanmire Community College and began playing his schoolboy football with local club Leeside United, before joining the academy of Cork City in 2020, progressing up through their under-14, under-15, under-17 and under-19 teams over the following years.

=== Cork City ===
On 25 July 2023, he signed his first professional contract with the club. O'Sullivan made his senior debut for Cork City on 14 August 2023, in a 3–1 loss to Cobh Ramblers in the Munster Senior Cup Final at Turners Cross. On 15 March 2024, he scored his first senior goal in a 2–0 win at home to Bray Wanderers. He scored twice in a 4–1 in away to Wexford at Ferrycarrig Park. On 12 July 2024, he scored the only goal of the game in a narrow victory over Finn Harps. In September 2024, he drew praise from manager Tim Clancy for being "technically streets ahead of any other young lad in the country. It will be very difficult to keep hold of Cathal O'Sullivan. I do believe that he is the standout kid in the country.". On 18 October 2024, O'Sullivan scored twice in a 6–0 win at home to Wexford before his side lifted the 2024 League of Ireland First Division title, earning promotion back to the Premier Division. In November 2024, O'Sullivan was named in the 2024 PFAI First Division Team of the Year by his fellow professionals in the league after scoring 7 goals in 28 league appearances in his first full season in senior football. In May 2025, he travelled to Crystal Palace to be shown around their facilities amidst interest in his signature from the Premier League club. A month later, reports emerged that Palace were joined by Brentford, Celtic and Preston North End in the race for O'Sullivan's signature. On 25 July 2025, O'Sullivan suffered an Anterior cruciate ligament injury in a 3–2 defeat at home to Sligo Rovers, with the result leaving Cork 11 points adrift at the bottom of the table as his season ended with the recovery period set to rule him out for the rest of the season, with a potential nine-month spell out injured on the cards. His contract with his hometown club expired on 30 November 2025.

=== Preston North End ===
On 5 March 2026, it was announced that O'Sullivan had signed for EFL Championship club Preston North End.

== International career ==
O'Sullivan made his first appearance in international football on 21 September 2021, captaining the Republic of Ireland U15 side in a 2–0 win over Montenegro U15, in which he scored the first goal and assisted the second. He made his Republic of Ireland U17 debut on 9 September 2023, replacing Aarón Ochoa Moloney from the bench in the 71st minute of a 0–0 draw with Belgium U17. On 5 September 2024, he made his debut for the Republic of Ireland U19 squad in a 2–1 defeat to France U19. On 21 May 2025, he received his first call up to the Republic of Ireland U21 side for their June friendly fixtures against Croatia U21 and Qatar U23 in Croatia. He made his debut for the U21s in a 1–0 loss to Croatia U21 on 6 June 2025.

== Career statistics ==
As of match played on 25 July 2025

Appearances and goals by club, season and competition
Club	Season	League			National Cup (Note: Includes FAI Cup & FA Cup)		League Cup (Note: Oncludes EFL Cup)		Other		Total	
Club	Season	Division	Apps	Goals	Apps	Goals	Apps	Goals	Apps	Goals	Apps	Goals
Cork City	2023	LOI Premier Division	0	0	0	0	–		1 (Note: Appearance(s) in the Munster Senior Cup)	0	1	0
Cork City	2024	LOI First Division	28	7	2	0	–		1	0	31	7
Cork City	2025	LOI Premier Division	21	0	1	0	–		1	0	23	0
Cork City	Total		49	7	3	0	–		3	0	55	7
Preston North End	2025–26	EFL Championship	0	0	–		–		–		0	0
Preston North End	2026–27	EFL Championship	0	0	0	0	0	0	–		0	0
Preston North End	Total		0	0	0	0	0	0	–		0	0
Career Total			49	7	3	0	0	0	3	0	55	7

== Honours ==
=== Club ===
Cork City

- League of Ireland First Division (1): 2024

=== Individual ===
- PFAI First Division Team of the Year (1): 2024
