= 2026–27 Preston North End F.C. season =

English football club season

Preston North End
2026–27 season
- Owner: Wordon Limited
- Chairman: Ian Penrose
- Manager: Graham Alexander (from 28 September); Jason Euell (interim); Paul Heckingbottom (until 13 September)
- Stadium: Deepdale
- Top goalscorer: League: Callum Lang (4); All: Callum Lang (4)
Home colours	Away colours	Third colours

The 2026–27 season is the 147th season in the history of Preston North End Football Club and their twelfth consecutive season in the Championship. In addition to the domestic league, the club would also participate in the FA Cup, and the EFL Cup.

== Managerial changes ==
On 13 September, Paul Heckingbottom was relieved from his duties as manager after six defeats in seven games at the start of the season. Jason Euell was promoted to take charge on an interim basis. Fifteen days later, Graham Alexander was appointed manager after being successful with Bradford City.

== Transfers and contracts ==
=== In ===
Date	Pos.	Player	From	Fee	Ref.
1 July 2026	GK	(England) Lee Nicholls	(England) Huddersfield Town	Undisclosed	
7 July 2026	CAM	(England) Alfie Devine	(England) Tottenham Hotspur	£6,000,000	
14 August 2026	RB	(England) Harry Clarke	(England) Ipswich Town	Undisclosed	
14 August 2026	CM	(France) Léo Leroy	(Switzerland) Basel	£2,500,000	
19 August 2026	CB	(England) Isaac Irwin	(England) Crewe Alexandra	Free	
27 August 2026	RW	(England) Stanley Mills	(England) Oxford United	£2,500,000	
1 September 2026	ST	(Republic of Ireland) Johnny Kenny	(Scotland) Celtic	Undisclosed	
6 November 2026	CM	(Scotland) Greg Docherty	(England) Charlton Athletic	Free	

=== Out ===
Date	Pos.	Player	To	Fee	Ref.
15 June 2026 (Note: The transfer was announced on 22 May, and would become official once the transfer window opens on June 15)	GK	(England) Jack Walton	(Scotland) Dundee United	Free transfer	
13 July 2026	CF	(England) Michael Smith	(England) Mansfield Town	Free transfer	
5 August 2026	CM	(England) Benjamin Whiteman	(Wales) Wrexham	£3,000,000	
24 August 2026	CF	(Montenegro) Milutin Osmajić	(Italy) Genoa	£2,100,000	

=== Loaned in ===
Date	Pos.	Player	From	Date until	Ref.
13 July 2026	CF	(Sweden) Jusef Erabi	(Belgium) Genk	End of Season (Note: Option to make the move permanent at the concluion of the loan deal.)	
7 August 2026	LW	(Suriname) Delano Burgzorg	(England) Middlesbrough	End of Season	
28 August 2026	LB	(United States) Caleb Wiley	(England) Chelsea	End of season	
1 September 2026	CM	(England) Liam Gibbs	(England) Norwich	End of season	

=== Loaned out ===
Date	Pos.	Player	To	Loaned until	Ref.
23 July 2026	LB	(England) Nathan Snowball	(England) FC United of Manchester	5 September 2026	
2 August 2026	GK	(England) Li-Bau Stowell	(England) Chorley	End of Season	
27 August 2026	CAM	(England) Kitt Nelson	(Northern Ireland) Linfield	End of Season	
4 September 2026	CF	(Northern Ireland) Max Wilson	(England) Chorley	2 January 2027	
16 October 2026	CM	(England) Harry Gerrard	(England) Runcorn Linnets	13 November 2026	
7 November 2026	CF	(Nigeria) Michael Ayodele	(England) Bamber Bridge	7 December 2026	

=== Released / Out of Contract ===
Date	Pos.	Player	Subsequent club	Joined date	Ref.
30 June 2026	CAM	(England) Isaac Lam	(England) Ramsbottom United	3 July 2026	
30 June 2026	CDM	(England) Noah Mawene	(England) Fleetwood Town	28 July 2026	
30 June 2026	GK	(Wales) James Pradic	(England) Fleetwood Town	28 July 2026	
30 June 2026	CF	(Argentina) Felipe Rodríguez-Gentile	(United States) Portland Hearts of Pine	14 August 2026	
30 June 2026	GK	(Wales) David Cornell	(England) Leicester City	18 September 2026	
30 June 2026	LWB	(Republic of Ireland) Robbie Brady	Free Agent		
30 June 2026	CF	(Republic of Ireland) Will Keane	(England) Doncaster Rovers	13 October 2026	
30 June 2026	LB	(Northern Ireland) Jamal Lewis	Free Agent		

=== New Contract ===
Date	Pos.	Player	Contract expiry	Ref.
22 July 2026	CB	(England) Ed Nolan	30 June 2028 (Note: First professional contract) (Note: Option to extend by a further year.)	
22 July 2026	CF	(England) George Gryba	30 June 2028	
22 July 2026	LB	(England) Nathan Snowball	30 June 2028	
22 July 2026	CM	(England) Harry Stringfellow	30 June 2028	
22 July 2026	LB	(England) Troy Tarry	30 June 2028	
13 August 2026	CF	(Scotland) Finlay Cameron	30 June 2027 (Note: Club option to extend by a further year)	

== Pre-season and friendlies ==
On 18 May, PNE announced a six-day training camp in South East Spain with a fixture against Cambridge United. Nine days later, a fixture against Stockport County to mark Ben Hinchliffe's testimonial was confirmed. On 2 June, a further two fixtures were added to the schedule against Bamber Bridge and Chorley. Six days later, a behind closed doors fixture against Sheffield Wednesday was confirmed. On 10 June, a sixth fixture was added to the scheduled against Bradford City.

Win Draw Loss Fixtures

14 July 2026 Friendly	Bamber Bridge	1–4	Preston North End	Bamber Bridge
19:00 BST	Poilly 5'	Report	Osmajić 2'; Storey 49'; Gibson 74'; Whiteman 90+4'	Stadium: SFC Stadium; Attendance: 1,374

15 July 2026 Friendly	Chorley	Postponed	Preston North End	Chorley
19:00 BST				Stadium: Victory Park
Note: Fixture was postponed due to England advancing through to the 2026 FIFA World Cup semi-finals.

18 July 2026 Friendly	Sheffield Wednesday	3–2	Preston North End	Sheffield
13:00 BST	Barry 15'; J. Lowe 25'; Johnson 70'		Devine 50'; Lang 60'	Stadium: Middlewood Road; Attendance: 0 (BCD)

24 July 2026 Friendly	Preston North End	0–1	Cambridge United	San Pedro del Pinatar, Murcia, Spain
11:00 CEST		Report	Bauer (yellow card) 21'; Heath 30'	Stadium: Pinatar Arena

29 July 2026 Friendly	Bradford City	3−2	Preston North End	Bradford
19:30 BST	Swan 10'; Wright 64'; Powell 82'	Report	Osmajić 53'; Storey 58'	Stadium: Valley Parade

1 August 2026 Friendly	Stockport County	1–0	Preston North End	Edgeley
15:00 BST	Diamond 69'	Report		Stadium: Edgeley Park; Attendance: 5,303 (692 away)

== Competitions ==
=== Overall record ===
Competition	First match	Last match	Starting round	Final position	Record							
Competition	First match	Last match	Starting round	Final position	Pld	W	D	L	GF	GA	GD	Win %
Championship	15 August 2026	1 May 2027	Matchday 1	TBD	16	2	3	11	14	31	−17	12.50
FA Cup	January 2027	TBD	Third round	TBD	0	0	0	0	0	0	+0	—
EFL Cup	8 August 2026	26 August 2026	First round	Second round	2	1	0	1	1	5	−4	50.00
Total					18	3	3	12	15	36	−21	16.67

Last updated: 21 November 2026
Source: Soccerway

=== Championship ===
==== League season ====
===== Under Paul Heckingbottom =====
Preston started their season on the 15th August where they travelled to the Toughsheet Community Stadium to face Bolton Wanderers. North End were defeated 2–1 with Jusef Erabi scoring Preston’s only goal, despite running the game for most of the second half. Their first home game was played on the 22nd August. They faced the newly relegated Wolves at Deepdale. Wolves won 3-1 and beat PNE in all aspects; Jordan Thompson scored from range in the 92nd minute for PNE’s only goal. In the following two games, North End were defeated 1-0 away to Charlton Athletic at The Valley and opened their second month of fixtures with a 3-1 defeat at home against Bristol City. By this point, Preston were one of two sides in the 72 EFL teams (alongside local rivals Wigan Athletic who play in League One) to remain without a single point, and they sat 24th place in the EFL Championship.

Preston finally got their first win of the season at home with a 2-1 victory over local rivals Blackburn Rovers. Callum Lang scored a brace. Lang was then back on the scoresheet as PNE conceded twice in 6 minutes to lose 2-1 away at Vicarage Road, Watford. They sat bottom of the league on just 3 points, sitting 2 more points adrift of the relegation zone.

PNE fell to a second successive defeat at home to newly promoted Lincoln City who won 1-0. Following this, Paul Heckingbottom was sacked as manager on 13th September with PNE second bottom.

A trip to the capital followed for PNE, who were managed by Jason Euell in the absence of a permanent manager. Despite a brace from Johnny Kenny inside 30 minutes PNE would draw 2-2 with two late goals from ten men QPR. Despite this, PNE remained 23rd in the Championship on just 4 points going into the international break, ahead of Burnley on goal difference.

===== Under Graham Alexander =====
Graham Alexander was appointed permanent manager on the 18th September and he faced Millwall F.C in his first match at Deepdale. Despite a much improved performance, PNE would still lose 1-0 after Millwall scored on minute 79.

Results would not improve in the coming weeks as PNE lost 4-0 away at Birmingham City and 4-1 away at Wrexham AFC. By 18th October, PNE were bottom and 8 points adrift of safety. Alexander would collect his first point of the season with a 1-1 home draw against West Bromwich Albion. Preston scored on 78 minutes before an immediate response on 82 minutes.

It was back to defeat the week after as PNE lost twice successively: once 2-0 away at Stoke, and a second 3-2 at home to Sheffield United, despite Preston opening the scoring. Alexander’s first win of the season came on November 7 as PNE defeated a high flying Southampton side - Jordan Thompson was again the lone goalscorer, scoring from long range. PNE sat bottom on 8 points, 2 points adrift from 23rd placed Derby and 22nd placed Burnley, respectively, and 7 points from safety.

==== League table ====
Pos	Team	Pld	W	D	L	GF	GA	GD	Pts	Promotion, qualification or relegation
20	Lincoln City	16	4	3	9	15	27	−12	15	
21	Watford	16	4	3	9	13	27	−14	15	
22	Burnley	15	1	7	7	22	31	−9	10	Relegation to EFL League One
23	Derby County	16	2	4	10	14	32	−18	10	Relegation to EFL League One
24	Preston North End	16	2	3	11	14	31	−17	9	Relegation to EFL League One

Updated to match(es) played on 21 November 2026. Source: EFL Official Website
Rules for classification: 1) Points; 2) Goal difference; 3) Number of goals scored; 4) Head-to-head results; 5) Wins; 6) Away goals; 7) Penalty points (sec 9.5); 8) Number of 12-point sending off offences; 9) Play-off (only if needed to determine promotion/relegation)

==== Results summary ====
Overall								Home						Away					
Pld	W	D	L	GF	GA	GD	Pts	W	D	L	GF	GA	GD	W	D	L	GF	GA	GD
16	2	3	11	14	31	−17	9	2	1	5	8	13	−5	0	2	6	6	18	−12

Last updated: 21 November 2026.
Source: Soccerway

==== Results by round ====
Round	1	2	3	4	5	6	7	8	9	10	11	12	13	14	15	16	17	18	19	20	21	22	23	24	25	26	27	28	29	30	31
Ground	A	H	A	H	H	A	H	A	H	A	A	H	A	H	H	A	A	H	A	H	H	A	H	A	A	H	H	A	A	H	A
Result	L	L	L	L	W	L	L	D	L	L	L	D	L	L	W	D															
Position	20	21	23	24	23	24	23	23	24	24	24	24	24	24	24	24															
Points	0	0	0	0	3	3	3	4	4	4	4	5	5	5	8	9															

Source: EFL
A = Away; H = Home; W = Win; D = Draw; L = Loss; P = Postponed

==== Matches ====
The Championship fixtures were released on 25 June 2026.

Win Draw Loss Fixtures

15 August 2026 1	Bolton Wanderers	2–1	Preston North End	Horwich
12:30 BST	Dalby 14'; Gale 25'; Sheehan (yellow card) 48'; Forino-Joseph (yellow card) 88'	Report	McCann (yellow card) 13'; Thompson (yellow card) 27'; Valentín (yellow card) 42'; Erabi 86'	Stadium: Toughsheet Community Stadium; Attendance: 26,262 (4,400 away); Referee: Adam Herczeg

22 August 2026 2	Preston North End	1–3	Wolverhampton Wanderers	Preston
15:00 BST	Hughes (yellow card) 14'; McCann (yellow card) 50'; Leroy (yellow card) 55'; Thompson 90+1'	Report	Munetsi (yellow card) 43'; López 8', 82'; Armstrong 81'	Stadium: Deepdale; Attendance: 19,341 (5,719 away); Referee: Elliot Bell

29 August 2026 3	Charlton Athletic	1–0	Preston North End	Charlton
15:00 BST	Grant 56'; Rankin-Costello (yellow card) 90+6'	Report	Leroy (yellow card) 54'	Stadium: The Valley; Attendance: 17,256 (962 away); Referee: Tom Reeves

1 September 2026 4	Preston North End	1–3	Bristol City	Preston
19:45 BST	Thompson (yellow card) 9'; Wiley 51'; Lindsay (yellow card) 83'	Report	Twine 4'; Eissat 79'; Ballard 86'	Stadium: Deepdale; Attendance: 13,028 (691 away); Referee: Ruebyn Ricardo

5 September 2026 5	Preston North End	2–1	Blackburn Rovers	Preston
12:30 BST	Lang 9', 28'; Burgzorg (yellow card) 42'; Mills (yellow card) 52'; Clarke (yellow card) 65'; Thompson (yellow card) 89'	Report	Ribeiro (yellow card) 25'; Morsy (yellow card) 40'; Mills 51' (o.g.)	Stadium: Deepdale; Attendance: 19,645 (5,561 away); Referee: Anthony Backhouse

8 September 2026 6	Watford	2–1	Preston North End	Watford
19:45 BST	Kayembe 69'; Doumbia 76'	Report	Lang 5'; Vukčević (yellow card) 62'; Gibson (yellow card) 67'	Stadium: Vicarage Road; Attendance: 14,987 (385 away); Referee: Farai Hallam

12 September 2026 7	Preston North End	0–1	Lincoln City	Preston
15:00 BST	Clarke (yellow card) 54'	Report	Draper 81'; Jefferies (yellow card) 86'	Stadium: Deepdale; Attendance: 14,702 (1,670 away); Referee: Stephen Martin

19 September 2026 8	Queens Park Rangers	2–2	Preston North End	Shepherd's Bush
15:00 BST	Cirkin (red card) 15'; Scarlett (yellow card) 22'; Saitō (yellow card) 55'; Poku 66'; Smyth 90'	Report	Kenny 1', 26'; Hughes (yellow card) 24'; Clarke (yellow card) 90'	Stadium: Loftus Road; Attendance: 16,582 (846 away); Referee: Thomas Parsons

10 October 2026 9	Preston North End	0–1	Millwall	Preston
15:00 BST	Leroy (yellow card) 15'	Report	Metcalfe (yellow card) 19'; Mazou-Sacko (yellow card) 71'; Neghli 79'	Stadium: Deepdale; Attendance: 17,602 (2,096 away); Referee: Ben Speedie

13 October 2026 10	Birmingham City	4–0	Preston North End	Birmingham
19:45 BST	Millar 34', (yellow card) 50'; Priske 45+2', 45+4'; Gray 76'	Report	Mills (yellow card) 47' (yellow-red card) 56'	Stadium: St Andrew's @ Knighthead Park; Attendance: 23,927 (400 away); Referee: Sam Allison

17 October 2026 11	Wrexham	4–1	Preston North End	Wrexham
15:00 BST	Whiteman (yellow card) 21', (goal) 42'; Worrall 31'; Smith 59'; Moore 63'; Doyle (yellow card) 80'	Report	Vukčević (yellow card) 9'; Devine 36'; Hughes (yellow card) 62'; Thompson (yellow card) 66'; Leroy (yellow card) 80'	Stadium: Racecourse Ground; Attendance: 10,614 (1,309 away); Referee: Simon Hooper

24 October 2026 12	Preston North End	1–1	West Bromwich Albion	Preston
15:00 BST	Moran (yellow card) 64'; Hughes 78'	Report	Whitwell (yellow card) 33'; Heggebø 82'	Stadium: Deepdale; Attendance: 17,430 (4,235 away); Referee: Elliot Bell

31 October 2026 13	Stoke City	2–0	Preston North End	Stoke-on-Trent
12:30 GMT	Wilmot 29'; Bombino (yellow card) 43'; McGlynn 53'; Galbraith (yellow card) 76'	Report	Potts (yellow card) 2'; Erabi (yellow card) 90'	Stadium: Bet365 Stadium; Attendance: 21,772 (1,184 away); Referee: Adam Herczeg

3 November 2026 14	Preston North End	2–3	Sheffield United	Preston
19:45 GMT	Leroy 2', (yellow card) 66'; Lang 76'	Report	Peck 27', 37', 45+1'	Stadium: Deepdale; Attendance: 13,723 (1,188 away); Referee: John Busby

7 November 2026 15	Preston North End	1–0	Southampton	Preston
15:00 GMT	Mills (yellow card) 3'; Lindsay (yellow card) 32'; Thompson 33'; Hughes (yellow card) 37'; Nolan (yellow card) 74'; Small (yellow card) 89'	Report		Stadium: Deepdale; Attendance: 15,746 (2,524 away); Referee: Tom Nield

21 November 2026 16	West Ham United	1–1	Preston North End	Stratford
15:00 GMT	Mavropanos 60'; Mayers (yellow card) 75'; Piroe (yellow card) 83'	Report	Lindsay 18'; Lang (yellow card) 29'; Mills (yellow card) 35'; Small (yellow card) 45+1'	Stadium: London Stadium; Attendance: 60,525 (3,001 away); Referee: Will Finnie

24 November 2026 17	Cardiff City	v	Preston North End	Leckwith
19:45 GMT				Stadium: Cardiff City Stadium

28 November 2026 18	Preston North End	v	Norwich City	Preston
12:30 GMT				Stadium: Deepdale
Note: Fixture was initially scheduled for a 15:00 kick-off, but was brought forward for live Sky Sports broadcasting.

6 December 2026 19	Burnley	v	Preston North End	Burnley
12:00 GMT				Stadium: Turf Moor
Note: Fixture was initially scheduled for 5 December, but was pushed back a day for live Sky Sports broadcasting.

9 December 2026 20	Preston North End	v	Portsmouth	Preston
19:45 GMT				Stadium: Deepdale

12 December 2026 21	Preston North End	v	Middlesbrough	Preston
12:30 GMT				Stadium: Deepdale
Note: Fixture was initially scheduled for a 15:00 kick-off, but was brought forward for live Sky Sports broadcasting.

19 December 2026 22	Swansea City	v	Preston North End	Landore
12:30 GMT				Stadium: Swansea.com Stadium
Note: Fixture was initially scheduled for a 15:00 kick-off, but was brought forward for live Sky Sports broadcasting.

26 December 2026 23	Preston North End	v	Derby County	Preston
15:00 GMT				Stadium: Deepdale

29 December 2026 24	West Bromwich Albion	v	Preston North End	West Bromwich
19:45 GMT				Stadium: The Hawthorns

1 January 2027 25	Middlesbrough	v	Preston North End	Middlesbrough
15:00 GMT				Stadium: Riverside Stadium

16 January 2027 26	Preston North End	v	Wrexham	Preston
15:00 GMT				Stadium: Deepdale

22 January 2027 27	Preston North End	v	Stoke City	Preston
20:00 GMT				Stadium: Deepdale
Note: Fixture was initially scheduled for 23 January, but was brought forward to the night before for live Sky Sports broadcasting.

26 January 2027 28	Sheffield United	v	Preston North End	Sheffield
19:45 GMT				Stadium: Bramall Lane

30 January 2027 29	Southampton	v	Preston North End	Southampton
15:00 GMT				Stadium: St Mary's Stadium

6 February 2027 30	Preston North End	v	West Ham United	Preston
15:00 GMT				Stadium: Deepdale

13 February 2027 31	Lincoln City	v	Preston North End	Lincoln
17:30 GMT				Stadium: ProAmpac Stadium
Note: Fixture was initially scheduled for a 15:00 kick-off, but was pushed back for live Sky Sports broadcasting.

=== FA Cup ===
Win Draw Loss Fixtures

=== EFL Cup ===
PNE were drawn at home to Huddersfield Town in the first round and to Everton in the second round. They were defeated 4-0 in the second round and eliminated by Everton.

Win Draw Loss Fixtures

8 August 2026 First round	Preston North End	1–1 (4–3 p)	Huddersfield Town	Liverpool
15:00 BST	Gibson (red card) 21'; Vukčević (yellow card) 37'; McCann (yellow card) 69'; Erabi 90+3'	Report	Gooch (yellow card) 4'; Balker 38'; Ledson (yellow card) 90'; Sørensen (yellow card) 90+1'	Stadium: Goodison Park; Attendance: 6,120; Referee: Sebastian Stockbridge
	Penalties
	Devine (penalty scored); Erabi (penalty scored); McCann (penalty scored); Moran (penalty missed); Burgzorg (penalty scored)		Ledson (penalty missed); Harness (penalty missed); Mumba (penalty scored); Smith-Sway (penalty scored); Taylor (penalty scored)

26 August 2026 Second round	Preston North End	0–4	Everton	Preston
20:00 BST		Report	Barry 25', 59', 70'; Johnson 72'	Stadium: Deepdale; Attendance: 16,834 (5,656 away); Referee: Tony Harrington

== Statistics ==
=== Appearances and goals ===
As of match played 21 November 2026

Players with no appearances are not included on the list; italics indicate a loaned in player

No.	Pos	Nat	Player	Total		Championship		FA Cup		EFL Cup	
No.	Pos	Nat	Player	Apps	Goals	Apps	Goals	Apps	Goals	Apps	Goals
1	GK	(Denmark) DEN	Daniel Iversen	15	0	14+0	0	0+0	0	1+0	0
2	DF	(Spain) ESP	Pol Valentín	5	0	1+2	0	0+0	0	2+0	0
3	DF	(Montenegro) MNE	Andrija Vukčević	16	0	11+3	0	0+0	0	2+0	0
4	DF	(England) ENG	Harry Clarke	9	0	8+0	0	0+0	0	0+1	0
5	MF	(Scotland) SCO	Greg Docherty	2	0	0+2	0	0+0	0	0+0	0
6	DF	(Scotland) SCO	Liam Lindsay	9	1	7+1	1	0+0	0	0+1	0
7	MF	(England) ENG	Alfie Devine	17	1	14+1	1	0+0	0	1+1	0
8	MF	(Northern Ireland) NIR	Ali McCann	4	0	2+0	0	0+0	0	1+1	0
9	FW	(Sweden) SWE	Jusef Erabi	15	2	4+9	1	0+0	0	1+1	1
10	FW	(England) ENG	Callum Lang	18	4	13+3	4	0+0	0	1+1	0
11	DF	(England) ENG	Thierry Small	12	0	3+8	0	0+0	0	1+0	0
12	DF	(United States) USA	Caleb Wiley	5	1	2+3	1	0+0	0	0+0	0
14	DF	(England) ENG	Jordan Storey	14	0	11+1	0	0+0	0	1+1	0
15	MF	(Northern Ireland) NIR	Jordan Thompson	17	2	14+1	2	0+0	0	2+0	0
16	DF	(Wales) WAL	Andrew Hughes	13	1	12+0	1	0+0	0	1+0	0
17	MF	(England) ENG	Stanley Mills	12	0	9+3	0	0+0	0	0+0	0
19	DF	(England) ENG	Lewis Gibson	8	0	4+2	0	0+0	0	2+0	0
20	MF	(England) ENG	Liam Gibbs	5	0	2+3	0	0+0	0	0+0	0
21	GK	(England) ENG	Lee Nicholls	3	0	2+0	0	0+0	0	1+0	0
23	MF	(Republic of Ireland) IRL	Andrew Moran	9	0	3+4	0	0+0	0	1+1	0
24	DF	(England) ENG	Odeluga Offiah	15	0	11+3	0	0+0	0	1+0	0
27	MF	(France) FRA	Léo Leroy	15	1	12+2	1	0+0	0	1+0	0
30	FW	(England) ENG	George Gryba	2	0	0+1	0	0+0	0	0+1	0
32	DF	(England) ENG	Ed Nolan	3	0	0+3	0	0+0	0	0+0	0
37	FW	(Netherlands) NED	Delano Burgzorg	16	0	7+7	0	0+0	0	1+1	0
38	FW	(Republic of Ireland) IRL	Johnny Kenny	8	2	7+1	2	0+0	0	0+0	0
44	DF	(England) ENG	Brad Potts	5	0	2+3	0	0+0	0	0+0	0
Players who featured but departed the club during the season:
28	FW	(Montenegro) MNE	Milutin Osmajić	2	0	1+0	0	0+0	0	1+0	0
