= Pol Valentín =

Spanish footballer (born 1997)

- Valentín with Preston North End in 2026

Personal information
- Full name: Pol Valentín Sancho
- Date of birth: 21 February 1997 (age 29)
- Place of birth: Avinyonet, Spain
- Height: 1.81 m (5 ft 11 in)
- Position: Right back

Team information
- Current team: Preston North End
- Number: 2

Youth career
- Figueres
- 2015–2016: Gimnàstic

Senior career*
Years	Team	Apps	(Gls)
2014–2015	Figueres	12	(0)
2016–2018	Pobla Mafumet	46	(1)
2018–2020	Gimnàstic	27	(1)
2020	Valencia B	6	(0)
2020–2022	Fuenlabrada	55	(0)
2022–2023	Sporting Gijón	22	(0)
2023–2025	Sheffield Wednesday	70	(1)
2025–	Preston North End	36	(0)
- * Club domestic league appearances and goals as of 16:25, 12 November 2026 (UTC)

Pol Valentín Sancho (born 21 February 1997) is a Spanish professional footballer who plays as a right back for EFL Championship club Preston North End.

== Club career ==
=== Early career ===
Born in Avinyonet de Puigventós, Girona, Catalonia, Valentín represented UE Figueres as a youth. On 6 December 2014, aged 17, he made his first team debut by coming on as a late substitute in a 1–0 Tercera División away win against FC Vilafranca.

On 3 July 2015, Valentín signed a three-year deal with Gimnàstic de Tarragona, returning to youth football. He was promoted to the farm team ahead of the 2016–17 season, and scored his first senior goal on 28 August 2016 in a 1–4 loss at Palamós CF; he was also sent off during the match.

Valentín was called up to the 2017 pre-season of the first team by new manager Lluís Carreras, being promoted in late July mainly as Otar Kakabadze's backup. On 7 August of that year, he renewed his contract until 2020.

Valentín made his professional debut on 13 January 2018, starting in a 1–1 away draw against UD Almería in the Segunda División. He was definitely promoted for the main squad for the 2018–19 season, which ended in relegation.

=== Valencia ===
On 31 January 2020, Valentín was transferred to Valencia CF, being assigned to the reserves also in the third division. On 29 August, he returned to the second tier after agreeing to a two-year contract with CF Fuenlabrada.

=== Sporting Gijón ===
On 11 July 2022, after Fuenla's relegation, Valentín signed a two-year contract with Sporting de Gijón also in division two.

=== Sheffield Wednesday ===
On 27 July 2023, he joined EFL Championship club Sheffield Wednesday for an undisclosed fee. He made his Sheffield Wednesday debut in the EFL Cup against Stockport County. He scored his first goal against Grimsby Town on 27 August 2024. He was released from his contract following the end of the 2024–25 season.

=== Preston North End ===
On 3 June 2025, it was announced that Valentín would sign for fellow Championship club Preston North End when his Sheffield Wednesday contract expired. He made his debut on the opening day of the season, coming off the bench in a 1–1 draw against Queens Park Rangers.

== Personal life ==
Valentín's elder brother, Gerard, is also a footballer and a right back. He was also trained at Figueres. Their father Albert was also a right back, and also played for Figueres.

== Career statistics ==
As of 10 October 2026

Club	Division	Season	League		National cup (Note: Includes Copa del Rey, FA Cup)		League cup (Note: Includes EFL Cup)		Other		Total	
Club	Division	Season	Apps	Goals	Apps	Goals	Apps	Goals	Apps	Goals	Apps	Goals
Figueres	Tercera División	2014–15	12	0	—		—		—		12	0
Pobla Mafumet	Tercera División	2016–17	21	1	—		—		—		21	1
Pobla Mafumet	Tercera División	2017–18	25	0	—		—		—		25	0
Pobla Mafumet	Total		46	1	—		—		—		46	1
Gimnàstic	Segunda División	2017–18	1	0	0	0	—		—		1	0
Gimnàstic	Segunda División	2018–19	10	0	1	0	—		—		11	0
Gimnàstic	Segunda División B	2019–20	16	1	1	0	—		—		17	1
Gimnàstic	Total		27	1	2	0	—		—		29	1
Valencia Mestalla	Segunda División B	2019–20	6	0	—		—		—		6	0
Fuenlabrada	Segunda División	2020–21	23	0	3	0	—		—		26	0
Fuenlabrada	Segunda División	2021–22	32	0	1	0	—		—		33	0
Fuenlabrada	Total		55	0	4	0	—		—		59	0
Sporting Gijón	Segunda División	2022–23	22	0	2	0	—		—		24	0
Sheffield Wednesday	EFL Championship	2023–24	36	0	2	0	2	0	—		40	0
Sheffield Wednesday	EFL Championship	2024–25	34	1	0	0	3	1	—		37	2
Sheffield Wednesday	Total		70	1	2	0	5	1	—		77	2
Preston North End	EFL Championship	2025–26	33	0	1	0	2	0	—		36	0
Preston North End	EFL Championship	2026–27	3	0	0	0	2	0	—		5	0
Preston North End	Total		36	0	1	0	4	0	—		41	0
Career Total			274	3	11	0	9	1	0	0	294	4
