= Harrison Armstrong (footballer) =

English footballer

Personal information
- Full name: Harrison David Armstrong
- Date of birth: 19 January 2007 (age 19)
- Place of birth: West Derby, Liverpool, England
- Height: 6 ft 1 in (1.85 m)
- Position: Central midfielder

Team information
- Current team: Everton
- Number: 45

Youth career
- 2012–2024: Everton

Senior career*
Years	Team	Apps	(Gls)
2024–	Everton	26	(0)
2025	→ Derby County (loan)	15	(1)
2025–2026	→ Preston North End (loan)	17	(1)

International career^{‡}
2024–2025	England U18	8	(0)
2025–	England U19	9	(2)
2026–	England U21	2	(0)
- * Club domestic league appearances and goals as of 22:55, 6 November 2026 (UTC) ‡ National team caps and goals as of 21:45, 13 November 2026 (UTC)

Harrison David Armstrong (born 19 January 2007) is an English professional footballer who plays as a central midfielder for Premier League club Everton.

== Club career ==
Born in the West Derby suburb of Liverpool, Armstrong is a product of the Everton academy and joined Everton at the age of five years old. He progressed from the Everton Under-18s into the Under-21s during the 2023–24 season.

Armstrong signed his first professional contract in July 2024, signing a three-year deal. He featured for Everton's first team in pre-season matches that summer against AS Roma and Salford City and scored a goal in a friendly match victory against Motherwell. Armstrong was subsequently named among the match-day substitutes for Everton on the opening day of the 2024–25 Premier League season at home against Brighton & Hove Albion on 17 August 2024. He made his Premier League debut for Everton away against Tottenham Hotspur on 24 August 2024.

On 3 February 2025, Armstrong joined Championship club Derby County, on loan until the end of the 2024–25 season. Armstrong made his Derby debut as a 66th minute substitute for Nathaniel Mendez-Laing in a 1–1 draw at Norwich City on 8 February 2025. On 15 March 2025, Armstrong scored his first goal in senior football in a 3–2 Derby County win over relegation rivals Plymouth Argyle. He played 15 times for Derby during his loan spell, starting in their last 11 Championship matches as Derby managed to escape relegation. Armstrong and Derby head coach John Eustace stated a desire to return to Derby for the 2025–26 season, whilst Everton head coach David Moyes said the loan spell aided the player’s development and he will play a part in Everton's pre-season preparation before a decision is made about whether to loan Armstrong out again.

On 1 September 2025, Armstrong joined Preston North End on loan until the end of the 2025–26 season. On 1 January 2026, he was recalled by Everton.

== International career ==
On 11 October 2024, Armstrong made his England U18 debut during a 2–0 defeat to Sweden in Marbella.

On 3 September 2025, Armstrong made his England U19 debut during a 2–0 win over Ukraine at Pinatar Arena.

== Personal life ==
Armstrong is the younger brother of Waterford defender Finlay Armstrong.

== Career statistics ==
As of match played 11 October 2026

Appearances and goals by club, season and competition
Club	Season	League			FA Cup		EFL Cup		Other		Total	
Club	Season	Division	Apps	Goals	Apps	Goals	Apps	Goals	Apps	Goals	Apps	Goals
Everton	2024–25	Premier League	3	0	1	0	2	0	—		6	0
Everton	2025–26	Premier League	13	0	1	0	1	0	—		15	0
Everton	2026–27	Premier League	9	0	0	0	1	0	—		10	0
Everton	Total		25	0	2	0	4	0	—		31	0
Derby County (loan)	2024–25	Championship	15	1	—		—		—		15	1
Preston North End (loan)	2025–26	Championship	17	1	—		—		—		17	1
Career total			57	2	2	0	4	0	0	0	63	2

== Honours ==
Individual

- Everton Young Player of the Season: 2025–26
