= Lewis Gibson (footballer) =

English footballer (born 2000)

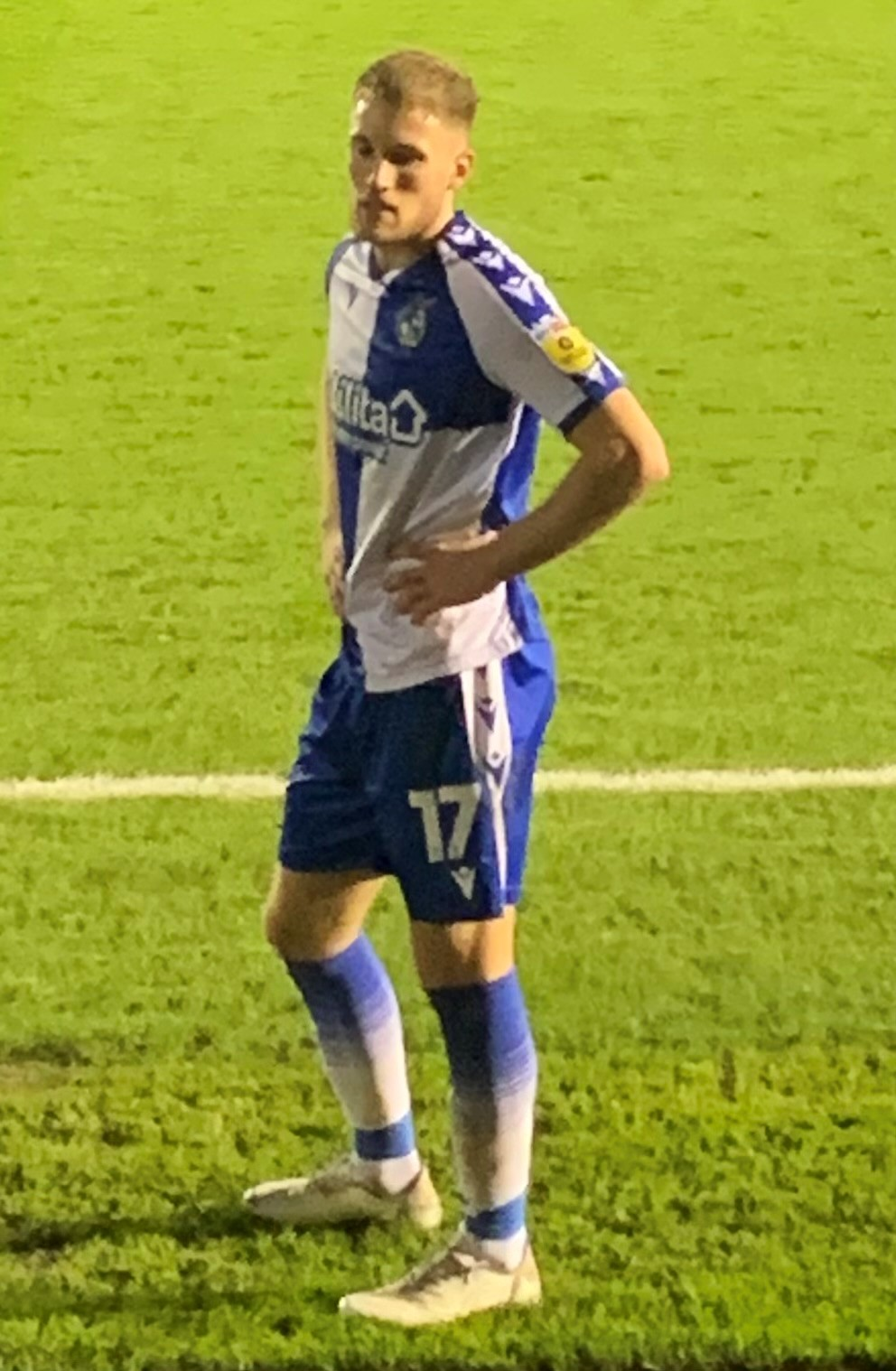
- Gibson playing for Bristol Rovers in 2022

Personal information
- Full name: Lewis Jack Gibson
- Date of birth: 19 July 2000 (age 26)
- Place of birth: Durham, England
- Height: 6 ft 1 in (1.85 m)
- Positions: Centre-back; left-back

Team information
- Current team: Preston North End
- Number: 19

Youth career
- 2010–2017: Newcastle United
- 2017–2019: Everton

Senior career*
Years	Team	Apps	(Gls)
2019–2023	Everton	0	(0)
2020	→ Fleetwood Town (loan)	9	(0)
2020–2021	→ Reading (loan)	13	(0)
2021–2022	→ Sheffield Wednesday (loan)	5	(0)
2022–2023	→ Bristol Rovers (loan)	31	(1)
2023–2025	Plymouth Argyle	59	(1)
2025–	Preston North End	52	(2)

International career^{‡}
2016–2017	England U17	12	(0)
2017–2018	England U18	3	(0)
2019	England U20	4	(0)
Medal record
Men's football
Representing England
FIFA U-17 World Cup
Winner	2017 India
UEFA European Under-17 Championship
Runner-up	2017 Croatia
- * Club domestic league appearances and goals as of 20:50, 13 October 2026 (UTC) ‡ National team caps and goals as of 16:26, 2 February 2020 (UTC)

Lewis Jack Gibson (born 19 July 2000) is an English professional footballer who plays as a centre-back or left-back for EFL Championship club Preston North End.

== Club career ==
=== Everton ===
Gibson came through the academy of Newcastle United before joining fellow Premier League club Everton in July 2017.

On 31 January 2020, Gibson joined League One side Fleetwood Town on loan until the end of the season. A day later, he made his senior debut as Fleetwood defeated Doncaster Rovers 2–1.

On 22 September 2020 he signed on loan for Reading.

On 7 August 2021, it was announced he had signed a season-long loan at League One side Sheffield Wednesday. He made his debut against Mansfield Town in the EFL Trophy on 5 October 2021, playing the first 45 minutes. After Gibson picked up another injury in his second game against Bolton Wanderers, manager Darren Moore confirmed that Gibson had returned to his parent club and would unlikely return. However, Gibson stayed at Wednesday and returned from injury against Doncaster Rovers on 19 February 2022.

On 12 August 2022, Gibson joined League One club Bristol Rovers on loan for the 2022–23 season. Gibson made his debut off the bench the following day in a 1–0 victory over Oxford United. Having suffered a thigh injury on New Year's Day following a long spell in the first-team, he was ruled out for several weeks. Having missed seven matches, Gibson returned to the first-team selection picture at the end of February. On 10 April 2023, he scored his first senior goal when he equalised in an eventual 2–1 victory over former club Fleetwood Town.

Following his return to Everton at the end of the 2022–23 season, he was offered a new contract.

=== Plymouth Argyle ===
On 3 July 2023, Gibson signed for Championship side Plymouth Argyle having rejected the offer of a new contract with Everton.

=== Preston North End ===
On 3 January 2025, Gibson signed for fellow Championship side Preston North End on a three-and-a-half year deal for a seven-figure fee.

== International career ==
Gibson has represented England at under-17, under-18 and under-20 level and was part of the side who lifted the FIFA U-17 World Cup in 2017.

== Personal life ==
Gibson's older brother Liam is also a professional footballer and currently plays for Harrogate Town.

Gibson attended Tanfield School.

== Career statistics ==
As of match played 13 October 2026

Appearances and goals by club, season and competition
Club	Season	League			FA Cup		League Cup		Other		Total	
Club	Season	Division	Apps	Goals	Apps	Goals	Apps	Goals	Apps	Goals	Apps	Goals
Everton U23	2017–18	—	—		—		—		1 (Note: Appearances in EFL Trophy.)	0	1	0
Everton U23	2019–20	—	—		—		—		3	0	3	0
Everton U23	Total		0	0	0	0	0	0	4	0	4	0
Everton	2019–20	Premier League	0	0	0	0	0	0	—		0	0
Everton	2020–21	Premier League	0	0	0	0	0	0	—		0	0
Everton	2021–22	Premier League	0	0	0	0	0	0	—		0	0
Everton	2022–23	Premier League	0	0	0	0	0	0	—		0	0
Everton	Total		0	0	0	0	0	0	0	0	0	0
Fleetwood Town (loan)	2019–20	League One	9	0	0	0	0	0	2 (Note: Appearances in the play-offs.)	0	11	0
Reading (loan)	2020–21	Championship	13	0	0	0	0	0	—		13	0
Sheffield Wednesday (loan)	2021–22	League One	5	0	0	0	0	0	1	0	6	0
Bristol Rovers (loan)	2022–23	League One	31	1	1	0	0	0	1	0	33	1
Plymouth Argyle	2023–24	Championship	41	0	3	0	0	0	—		44	0
Plymouth Argyle	2024–25	Championship	18	1	0	0	1	0	—		19	1
Plymouth Argyle	Total		59	1	3	0	1	0	0	0	63	1
Preston North End	2024–25	Championship	19	1	4	0	0	0	—		23	1
Preston North End	2025–26	Championship	27	1	1	0	1	0	—		29	1
Preston North End	2026–27	Championship	6	0	0	0	2	0	—		8	0
Preston North End	Total		52	2	5	0	3	0	0	0	60	2
Career total			169	4	9	0	4	0	8	0	190	4

== Honours ==
Everton U23s

- Premier League Cup: 2018–19

England U17

- FIFA U-17 World Cup: 2017
- UEFA European Under-17 Championship runner-up: 2017
