= Ali McCann =

Northern Irish footballer

Personal information
- Full name: Alistair Edward McCann
- Date of birth: 4 December 1999 (age 26)
- Place of birth: Edinburgh, Scotland
- Height: 1.76 m (5 ft 9 in)
- Position: Midfielder

Team information
- Current team: Preston North End
- Number: 8

Youth career
- Hutchison Vale Boys Club
- 2012–2017: St Johnstone

Senior career*
Years	Team	Apps	(Gls)
2017–2021	St Johnstone	71	(6)
2019	→ Stranraer (loan)	13	(1)
2021–	Preston North End	147	(3)

International career^{‡}
- Northern Ireland youth
2019–2020	Northern Ireland U21	6	(0)
2020–	Northern Ireland	33	(1)
- * Club domestic league appearances and goals as of 20:44, 26 August 2026 (UTC) ‡ National team caps and goals as of 13 October 2025

Alistair Edward McCann (born 4 December 1999) is a professional footballer who plays as a midfielder for EFL Championship club Preston North End. Born in Scotland, he represents the Northern Ireland national team.

== Early and personal life ==
Born in Edinburgh, McCann and his brothers Lewis (who is also a footballer) and Ross (who is Scotland and GB 7s rugby player) were born and raised in Scotland to a Northern Irish father and an English mother.

== Club career ==
McCann moved from Hutchison Vale Boys Club to St Johnstone in 2012. He made his senior debut on 29 January 2018.

McCann joined Stranraer on loan in February 2019.

In May 2021 he was monitored by Celtic. He moved to Preston North End on 31 August 2021.

== International career ==
McCann has played youth football for Northern Ireland, including at under-21 level.

On 15 November 2020, McCann made his senior international debut, against Austria.

In October 2023 he pulled out of the Northern Ireland squad due to injury.

== Career statistics ==
As of match played 26 August 2026

Appearances and goals by club, season and competition
Club	Season	League			National cup (Note: Includes Scottish Cup, FA Cup)		League cup (Note: Includes Scottish League Cup, EFL Cup)		Other		Total	
Club	Season	Division	Apps	Goals	Apps	Goals	Apps	Goals	Apps	Goals	Apps	Goals
St Johnstone	2016–17	Scottish Premiership	0	0	0	0	0	0	1 (Note: Appearances for the U20 team in Scottish League Challenge Cup.)	0	1	0
St Johnstone	2017–18	Scottish Premiership	3	0	1	0	0	0	1	0	5	0
St Johnstone	2018–19	Scottish Premiership	1	0	0	0	1	0	1	0	3	0
St Johnstone	2019–20	Scottish Premiership	29	4	3	0	3	0	0	0	35	4
St Johnstone	2020–21	Scottish Premiership	34	2	5	0	4	0	0	0	43	2
St Johnstone	2021–22	Scottish Premiership	4	0	0	0	1	0	4 (Note: Appearances in UEFA Europa League)	0	9	0
St Johnstone	Total		71	6	9	0	9	0	7	0	96	6
Stranraer (loan)	2018–19	Scottish League One	13	1	0	0	0	0	0	0	13	1
Preston North End	2021–22	EFL Championship	28	1	1	0	2	0	0	0	31	1
Preston North End	2022–23	EFL Championship	31	0	2	0	2	2	0	0	35	2
Preston North End	2023–24	EFL Championship	31	0	1	0	1	0	0	0	33	0
Preston North End	2024–25	EFL Championship	29	1	3	0	2	0	0	0	34	1
Preston North End	2025–26	Championship	26	1	1	0	1	0	—		28	1
Preston North End	2026–27	Championship	2	0	0	0	2	0	—		4	0
Preston North End	Total		147	3	8	0	10	2	0	0	165	5
Career total			231	10	17	0	19	2	7	0	274	12

== Honours ==
St Johnstone

- Scottish Cup: 2020–21
- Scottish League Cup: 2020–21
