= Alfie Devine =

English footballer (born 2004)

- Devine with Preston North End in 2026

Personal information
- Full name: Alfie Sean Devine
- Date of birth: 1 August 2004 (age 22)
- Place of birth: Warrington, England
- Height: 6 ft 0 in (1.82 m)
- Position: Midfielder

Team information
- Current team: Preston North End
- Number: 7

Youth career
- Liverpool
- 2015–2020: Wigan Athletic
- 2020–2023: Tottenham Hotspur

Senior career*
Years	Team	Apps	(Gls)
2021–2026	Tottenham Hotspur	0	(0)
2023–2024	→ Port Vale (loan)	20	(2)
2024	→ Plymouth Argyle (loan)	15	(0)
2024–2025	→ Westerlo (loan)	30	(6)
2025–2026	→ Preston North End (loan)	45	(8)
2026–	Preston North End	11	(1)

International career
2019	England U16	4	(0)
2021–2022	England U19	13	(2)
2023–2024	England U20	13	(2)
Medal record
Men's football
Representing England
UEFA European Under-19 Championship
Winner	2022 Slovakia
- * Club domestic league appearances and goals as of 18:15, 17 October 2026 (UTC)

Alfie Sean Devine (born 1 August 2004) is an English professional footballer who plays as a midfielder for EFL Championship club Preston North End.

An England youth international, he won the UEFA European Under-19 Championship with the under-19 team in 2022. He joined Tottenham Hotspur from the youth system of Wigan Athletic for around £300,000 in July 2020 and made his senior debut for Spurs in January 2021. He spent the first half of the 2023–24 season on loan at Port Vale and was loaned out to Plymouth Argyle for the second half. He joined Belgian club Westerlo on loan for the 2024–25 season. He joined Preston North End on loan for the 2025–26 campaign and then joined Preston permanently for a club-record fee.

== Early life ==
Alfie Sean Devine was born on 1 August 2004 in Warrington. He is the son of Claire Devine, a human resources professional, and former rugby league scrum-half Sean Devine, who played for St Helens from 1986 to 1991 and Oldham from 1992 to 1993.

== Club career ==
=== Early career ===
Devine was an academy player for Liverpool. He was released at the age of 11 and joined Wigan Athletic four months later. He made his under-23 debut aged 15, and was part of the team that beat Tottenham Hotspur in the fourth round of the 2019–20 FA Youth Cup, coming on as a late substitute. He started in the quarter-final against Manchester United at Old Trafford. He was signed by Wigan on 6 June 2020. However, Wigan went into administration less than a month later, and he was then sold to Tottenham Hotspur (Spurs) on 28 July for around £300,000. He spent much of his early career as a holding midfielder, before being moved further forward at Spurs.

=== Tottenham Hotspur ===
Devine was sent off during an U23 match against Chelsea in December 2020 after becoming involved in a physical confrontation with Danny Drinkwater. On 10 January 2021, Devine made his senior debut for Tottenham in the third round match of the FA Cup against Marine. He came on as a substitute at the start of the second half and scored a goal, capping a 5–0 win for Tottenham. His debut at 16 years and 163 days made him the youngest player to have played for Tottenham in a senior game, breaking the record previously held by his under-18 teammate Dane Scarlett. He turned professional under Nuno Espírito Santo, signing a three-year contract on his 17th birthday. The Athletic reported that Antonio Conte was a big fan of Devine, however, the teenager suffered with injuries during the 2021–22 season. He was limited to one FA Cup appearance during the 2022–23 campaign.

==== Loan to Port Vale ====
On 25 August 2023, Devine joined EFL League One club Port Vale on loan for the 2023–24 season. He made his debut the following day, in a 1–0 win over Carlisle United at Vale Park. He scored his first goal in the English Football League on 2 September, when he converted a stoppage-time penalty kick to secure a 2–1 victory at Oxford United. On 31 October, he scored the only goal of the game at Mansfield Town to put the Vale through to the quarter-finals of the EFL Cup for the first time in the club's history. The goal won him the Goal of the Round award, whilst he was also named Player of the Round. Injuries to Ollie Arblaster and Funso Ojo saw Devine moved into a deeper position, where his long-range passing ability saw him excel in the role. He was recalled to Spurs on 17 January, having scored three goals and made three assists in his 26 appearances for the Valiants, earning praise from manager Andy Crosby and director of football David Flitcroft.

==== Loan to Plymouth Argyle ====
On 17 January 2024, Devine joined Plymouth Argyle of the Championship on loan until the end of the 2023–24 season, where director of football Neil Dewsnip noted that head coach Ian Foster had previously selected Devine for international duty in the England setup. On 1 April, Devine was sent off after receiving two yellow cards with 12 minutes to go of what proved to be Foster's last game in charge of the club. He made nine starts and six substitute appearances, and Dewsnip hinted that the club would try to bring him back for the following season.

==== Loan to Westerlo ====
On 4 September 2024, Devine joined Belgian Pro League club Westerlo on loan for the 2024–25 season. He sustained a hamstring injury in February and was sidelined for six weeks. He scored six goals in 32 games across the campaign.

=== Preston North End ===
On 8 August 2025, Devine signed a new contract with Spurs and joined Championship club Preston North End on a season-long loan. He scored on his home debut at Deepdale, a 2–1 win over Leicester City on 16 August, having rounded goalkeeper Jakub Stolarczyk and finished from a tight angle at 20 yd (18 m) out. He scored eight goals across 48 appearances across the 2025–26 season, being named as Preston's Young Player of the Year.

On 7 July 2026, Devine signed a five-year contract with Preston after the club paid a club-record fee for him, reportedly in the region of £6 million.

== International career ==
Devine represented England at under-16 level, playing at the Sportchain AGS Cup in December 2019; the tournament was won by Spain, but he was named player of the tournament. On 2 September 2021, Devine made his debut for the England U19s during a 2–0 victory over Italy U19s at St. George's Park. On 17 June 2022, Devine was included in the U19 squad for the 2022 UEFA European Under-19 Championship. He scored in their opening group game against Austria. He started in the final as England won the tournament with a 3–1 extra time victory over Israel on 1 July 2022. Devine made his England U20 debut during a 2–0 win over Germany in Manchester on 22 March 2023. On 10 May 2023, he was included in the England squad for the 2023 FIFA U-20 World Cup. He scored in a group stage victory over Uruguay and their only goal in the round of 16 elimination against Italy.

Devine was drafted in to train with the senior team in September 2023, as he and Bashir Humphreys replaced injured duo Bukayo Saka and Levi Colwill.

== Style of play ==
Devine is a midfielder with excellent technical skills, such as dribbling and close control. He has good set piece skills and can finish with both feet. Manager José Mourinho said he "[has] an instinct to appear in finishing zones and to score goals".

== Career statistics ==
As of match played 17 October 2026

Appearances and goals by club, season and competition
Club	Season	League			National cup (Note: Includes FA Cup, Belgian Cup)		League cup (Note: Includes EFL Cup)		Other		Total	
Club	Season	Division	Apps	Goals	Apps	Goals	Apps	Goals	Apps	Goals	Apps	Goals
Tottenham Hotspur	2020–21	Premier League	0	0	1	1	0	0	—		1	1
Tottenham Hotspur	2021–22	Premier League	0	0	0	0	0	0	—		0	0
Tottenham Hotspur	2022–23	Premier League	0	0	1	0	0	0	—		1	0
Tottenham Hotspur	2023–24	Premier League	0	0	0	0	0	0	—		0	0
Tottenham Hotspur	2024–25	Premier League	0	0	0	0	0	0	—		0	0
Tottenham Hotspur	2025–26	Premier League	0	0	0	0	0	0	0	0	0	0
Tottenham Hotspur	Total		0	0	2	1	0	0	0	0	2	1
Tottenham Hotspur U21	2021–22	—			—		—		1 (Note: Appearance in EFL Trophy)	0	1	0
Port Vale (loan)	2023–24	League One	20	2	2	0	4	1	0	0	26	3
Plymouth Argyle (loan)	2023–24	Championship	15	0	0	0	—		—		15	0
Westerlo (loan)	2024–25	Belgian Pro League	30	6	2	0	—		—		32	6
Preston North End (loan)	2025–26	Championship	45	8	1	0	2	0	—		48	8
Preston North End	2026–27	Championship	11	1	0	0	2	0	—		13	1
Career total			121	17	7	1	8	1	1	0	137	19

== Honours ==
England U19s

- UEFA European Under-19 Championship: 2022
