= Daniel Iversen =

Danish footballer (born 1997)

Personal information
- Full name: Daniel Lønne Iversen
- Date of birth: 19 July 1997 (age 29)
- Place of birth: Gørding, Denmark
- Height: 1.93 m (6 ft 4 in)
- Position: Goalkeeper

Team information
- Current team: Preston North End
- Number: 1

Youth career
- –2009: Gørding LIF
- 2009–2016: Esbjerg
- 2016–2018: Leicester City

Senior career*
Years	Team	Apps	(Gls)
2018–2025	Leicester City	12	(0)
2018–2019	→ Oldham Athletic (loan)	42	(0)
2019–2020	→ Rotherham United (loan)	34	(0)
2020–2021	→ OH Leuven (loan)	5	(0)
2021	→ Preston North End (loan)	23	(0)
2021–2022	→ Preston North End (loan)	46	(0)
2024	→ Stoke City (loan)	18	(0)
2025–	Preston North End	50	(0)

International career
2012–2013	Denmark U16	8	(0)
2012–2013	Denmark U17	12	(0)
2013–2014	Denmark U18	3	(0)
2014–2016	Denmark U19	17	(0)
2016–2017	Denmark U20	4	(0)
2017–2019	Denmark U21	16	(0)
- * Club domestic league appearances and goals as of 21:40, 3 November 2026 (UTC)

Daniel Lønne Iversen (born 19 July 1997) is a Danish professional footballer who plays as a goalkeeper for EFL Championship club Preston North End.

== Club career ==
=== Early career ===
Iversen started out in the academy at Gørding LIF, after which he joined the biggest club in the region, Esbjerg as a 12-year-old.

=== Leicester City ===
He moved to English club Leicester City in January 2016, signing a contract until June 2019.

Iversen moved on loan to EFL League Two side Oldham Athletic in July 2018, the same day as he signed a new four-year contract with Leicester. He made his professional debut on the first day of the 2018–19 season, starting the game against Milton Keynes Dons. Iversen helped Oldham to an FA Cup "giant killing" against Premier League side Fulham, saving a late penalty in a 2–1 victory. Iversen would go on to make 49 appearances in all competitions for The Latics.

In July 2019, Iversen moved to EFL League One team Rotherham United on a season long loan. Iversen made his Rotherham debut on 3 August 2019, in a 2–1 victory over AFC Wimbledon.

In August 2020, Iversen joined Belgian First Division A team Oud-Heverlee Leuven on a season-long loan. Iversen started five games before suffering a hip injury in the match against Oostende. Following his return from injury, he became second choice goalkeeper behind Rafael Romo, which resulted in his loan being terminated on 7 January 2021, allowing him to move on loan to English club Preston North End that same day. He returned to Preston North End for a second loan spell in August 2021. He was named as the Lancashire side's Player of the Year for 2021–22.

After six years with the club, Iversen made his debut for Leicester on 23 August 2022 in an EFL Cup match away at Stockport County; he saved three penalties in the penalty shoot-out and was described as a "hero". His performance was praised by Leicester manager Brendan Rodgers. He made his Premier League debut in a 1–1 draw against Brentford on 18 March 2023.

On 5 January 2024, Iversen joined fellow Championship club Stoke City on loan until the end of the 2023–24 season. In April, Iversen said he expected to leave Leicester in the summer. Iversen made 19 appearances for Stoke helping them to secure their Championship status.

=== Preston North End ===
In May 2025, it was announced that Iversen join Preston North End on 1 July 2025 following the expiry of his Leicester contract.

== International career ==
Iversen has represented Denmark at youth international levels from under-16 to under-21. Iversen was called up to the under-21 squad for the 2019 UEFA European Under-21 Championship, playing in all three of Denmark's games and saving a penalty in a 3–1 victory against Austria. In September 2019, Iversen received his first call up to the senior Denmark team for the UEFA Euro 2020 qualifying matches against Gibraltar and Georgia.

== Career statistics ==
As of match played 3 November 2026

Appearances and goals by club, season and competition
Club	Season	League			National cup (Note: Includes FA Cup, Belgian Cup)		League cup (Note: Includes EFL Cup)		Other		Total	
Club	Season	Division	Apps	Goals	Apps	Goals	Apps	Goals	Apps	Goals	Apps	Goals
Leicester City	2018–19	Premier League	0	0	0	0	0	0	—		0	0
Leicester City	2019–20	Premier League	0	0	0	0	0	0	—		0	0
Leicester City	2020–21	Premier League	0	0	0	0	0	0	0	0	0	0
Leicester City	2021–22	Premier League	0	0	0	0	0	0	0	0	0	0
Leicester City	2022–23	Premier League	12	0	3	0	2	0	—		17	0
Leicester City	2023–24	Championship	0	0	0	0	0	0	—		0	0
Leicester City	2024–25	Premier League	0	0	0	0	0	0	—		0	0
Leicester City	Total		12	0	3	0	2	0	0	0	17	0
Oldham Athletic (loan)	2018–19	League Two	42	0	4	0	1	0	2 (Note: Appearances in EFL Trophy)	0	49	0
Rotherham United (loan)	2019–20	League One	34	0	3	0	1	0	0	0	38	0
OH Leuven (loan)	2020–21	Belgian Pro League	5	0	0	0	0	0	—		5	0
Preston North End (loan)	2020–21	Championship	23	0	0	0	0	0	—		23	0
Preston North End (loan)	2021–22	Championship	46	0	1	0	1	0	—		48	0
Stoke City (loan)	2023–24	Championship	18	0	1	0	0	0	—		19	0
Preston North End	2025–26	Championship	36	0	1	0	0	0	—		37	0
Preston North End	2026–27	Championship	14	0	0	0	1	0	—		15	0
Preston North End	Total		50	0	1	0	1	0	0	0	52	0
Career total			230	0	13	0	5	0	2	0	250	0

== Honours ==
Individual

- Preston North End Player of the Year: 2021–22
