= 2025–26 Preston North End F.C. season =

English football club season

Preston North End
2025–26 season
- Owner: Wordon Limited
- Chairman: Craig Hemmings (until 13 October); Ian Penrose (From 13 October)
- Manager: Paul Heckingbottom
- Stadium: Deepdale
- Championship: 14th
- FA Cup: Third round
- EFL Cup: Second round
- Top goalscorer: League: Lewis Dobbin (10); All: Lewis Dobbin (11)
Home colours	Away colours	Third colours

The 2025–26 season is the 146th season in the history of Preston North End Football Club and their eleventh consecutive season in the Championship. In addition to the domestic league, the club would also participate in the FA Cup, and the EFL Cup.

== Transfers and contracts ==
=== In ===
Date	Pos.	Player	From	Fee	Ref.
1 July 2025 (Note: The transfer was announced on 27 May, and would become official on July 1 once his contract at Leicester had ended)	GK	(Denmark) Daniel Iversen	(England) Leicester City	Free	
1 July 2025 (Note: The transfer was announced on 6 June, and would become official on July 1 once his contract at Charlton had ended)	LB	(England) Thierry Small	(England) Charlton Athletic	Free	
1 July 2025 (Note: The transfer was announced on 16 May, and would become official on July 1 once his contract at Stoke had ended)	CM	(Northern Ireland) Jordan Thompson	(England) Stoke City	Free	
1 July 2025 (Note: The transfer was announced on 3 June, and would become official on July 1 once his contract at Sheffield Wednesday had ended)	RB	(Spain) Pol Valentín	(England) Sheffield Wednesday	Free	
5 July 2025	RB	(England) Odeluga Offiah	(England) Brighton & Hove Albion	Undisclosed	
22 July 2025	CF	(England) Michael Smith	(England) Sheffield Wednesday	Free	
22 July 2025	GK	(England) Jack Walton	(England) Luton Town	Undisclosed	
25 July 2025	LB	(Montenegro) Andrija Vukčević	(Mexico) Juárez	Free	
31 October 2025	LB	(Northern Ireland) Jamal Lewis	(England) Newcastle United	Free	
2 February 2026	LW	(England) Callum Lang	(England) Portsmouth	£2,500,000	
2 February 2026	CAM	(Republic of Ireland) Andrew Moran	(England) Brighton & Hove Albion	£1,000,000	
5 March 2026	RW	(Republic of Ireland) Cathal O'Sullivan	(Republic of Ireland) Cork City	Compensation	

=== Out ===
Date	Pos.	Player	To	Fee	Ref.
19 June 2025	CM	(England) Theo Mawene	(England) Brentford	Undisclosed	
1 July 2025 (Note: The transfer was announced on 9 May, but became official on July 1 once the Swiss transfer window reopened)	CF	(England) Layton Stewart	(Switzerland) FC Thun	Undisclosed	
9 July 2025	CB	(England) Jack Whatmough	(England) Huddersfield Town	Undisclosed	
29 August 2025	LW	(Denmark) Jeppe Okkels	(Sweden) Djurgårdens	Undisclosed	
12 January 2026	CM	(Iceland) Stefán Teitur Þórðarson	(Germany) Hannover 96	Undisclosed	
25 January 2026	RB	(Republic of Ireland) Josh Seary	(England) F.C. United of Manchester	Free	
2 February 2026	CAM	(Denmark) Mads Frøkjær-Jensen	(Denmark) Brøndby	€1,500,000	

=== Loaned in ===
Date	Pos.	Player	From	Date until	Ref.
7 July 2025 (Note: The loan was announced on 21 June, and would become official on July 7 once the 2025 CONCACAF Gold Cup has concluded)	CF	(Canada) Daniel Jebbison	(England) Bournemouth	31 May 2026	
8 August 2025	CAM	(England) Alfie Devine	(England) Tottenham Hotspur	31 May 2026 (Note: Option to buy included in loan deal)	
22 August 2025	LW	(England) Lewis Dobbin	(England) Aston Villa	31 May 2026	
1 September 2025	CM	(England) Harrison Armstrong	(England) Everton	1 January 2026 (Note: On 1 January, Armstrong was recalled to his parent club Everton)	
29 January 2026	CF	(Serbia) Miloš Luković	(France) Strasbourg	31 May 2026	

=== Loaned out ===
Date	Pos.	Player	To	Date until	Ref.
22 July 2025	CM	(England) Kaedyn Kamara	(Republic of Ireland) Cork City	30 November 2025	
8 August 2025	GK	(England) Li-Bau Stowell	(England) Warrington Town	9 September 2025	
14 November 2025	CF	(Northern Ireland) Max Wilson	(England) Chorley	25 April 2026 (Note: On 12 December, Wilson's loan at Chorley was extended by a further month. On 11 January, it was extended again until the end of the regular National League North season)	
14 January 2026	CF	(Republic of Ireland) Will Keane	(England) Reading	31 May 2026	
23 January 2026	CAM	(England) Theo Carroll	(England) Curzon Ashton	21 February 2026	
29 January 2026	LB	(Poland) Kacper Pasiek	(England) Macclesfield	31 May 2026 (Note: On 6 March, Pasiek's loan at Macclesfield was extended until the end of the season)	
30 January 2026	CF	(Argentina) Felipe Rodríguez-Gentile	(England) AFC Fylde	31 May 2026	
2 February 2026	CM	(England) Kaedyn Kamara	(Scotland) Ross County	31 May 2026	
11 February 2026	CF	(England) Somto Ifezue	(England) Clitheroe	11 March 2026	
12 February 2026	LB	(England) Jonny Brindle	(England) Lancaster City	12 March 2026	
12 February 2026	CB	(England) Ed Nolan	(England) Lancaster City	24 April (Note: On 17 March, Nolan's loan at Lancaster City was extended until the end of the season, but then on April 24 he was recalled to PNE)	
13 February 2026	GK	(England) Li-Bau Stowell	(England) Hyde United	25 April 2026	
20 February 2026	CF	(England) George Gryba	(England) Bamber Bridge	20 March 2026	
20 February 2026	LB	(England) Nathan Snowball	(England) Bamber Bridge	20 March 2026	
10 March 2026	CDM	(England) Noah Mawene	(England) Southend United	31 May 2026	
15 April 2026	GK	(England) Jack Walton	(England) Cambridge United	22 April 2026	

=== Released / Out of Contract ===
Date	Pos.	Player	Subsequent club	Join date	Ref.
30 June 2025	CM	(England) Ryan Ledson	(England) Huddersfield Town	1 July 2025	
30 June 2025	CF	(Denmark) Emil Riis	(England) Bristol City	1 July 2025	
30 June 2025	GK	(England) Freddie Woodman	(England) Liverpool	1 July 2025	
30 June 2025	CB	(England) Cole McGhee	(England) Sheffield Wednesday	2 July 2025	
30 June 2025	LB	(England) Kian Best	(England) Chelsea	4 July 2025	
30 June 2025	CF	(Wales) Ched Evans	(England) Fleetwood Town	25 July 2025	
30 June 2025	CM	(England) Kian Taylor	(Scotland) Greenock Morton	25 July 2025	
30 June 2025	CB	(Germany) Patrick Bauer	(England) AFC Wimbledon	20 August 2025	

=== New Contract ===
Date	Pos.	Player	Contract until	Ref.
4 June 2025	LB	(Poland) Kacper Pasiek	30 June 2027 (Note: First professional contract)	
11 August 2025	CAM	(England) Theo Carroll	30 June 2028	
3 September 2025	GK	(England) Li-Bau Stowell	30 June 2028	
16 October 2025	CM	(Northern Ireland) Ali McCann	30 June 2029	
31 December 2025	LB	(Northern Ireland) Jamal Lewis	30 June 2026	

== Pre-season and friendlies ==
In June, Preston North End announced pre-season friendlies against Getafe, during a training camp in Valencia, Liverpool, Bamber Bridge, Chorley and Bolton Wanderers.

Win Draw Loss Fixtures

8 July 2025 Friendly	Bamber Bridge	2–1	Preston North End XI	Bamber Bridge
19:00 BST	Cullen 15', 33'	Report	Ayodele 73'	Stadium: SFC Stadium; Attendance: 1,021

9 July 2025 Friendly	Chorley	0–1	Preston North End	Chorley
19:30 BST		Report	Þórðarson 52'	Stadium: Victory Park; Attendance: 1,982

13 July 2025 Friendly	Preston North End	1-3	Liverpool	Preston
15:00 BST				Stadium: Deepdale

18 July 2025 Friendly	Getafe	0–0	Preston North End	Valencia, Spain
18:00 CEST		Report		Stadium: Oliva Nova Sports Center

22 July 2025 Friendly	Preston North End	0–2	Tranmere Rovers	Euxton
15:00 BST		Report	Davison; Patrick	Stadium: Preston North End Training Ground; Attendance: 0 (behind closed doors)

26 July 2025 Friendly	Bolton Wanderers	2–0	Preston North End	Horwich
15:00 BST	Cozier-Duberry 73'; Randall 76'	Report		Stadium: Toughsheet Community Stadium

2 August 2025 Friendly	Manchester City	1–0	Preston North End	Bradford-with-Beswick
13:00 BST	Lewis	Report		Stadium: City Football Academy; Attendance: 0 (behind closed doors)

== Competitions ==
=== Overall record ===
Competition	First match	Last match	Starting round	Final position	Record							
Competition	First match	Last match	Starting round	Final position	Pld	W	D	L	GF	GA	GD	Win %
Championship	9 August 2025	May 2026	Matchday 1	TBD	41	13	15	13	48	52	−4	31.71
FA Cup	9 January 2026	9 January 2026	Third round	Third round	1	0	0	1	0	1	−1	0.00
EFL Cup	12 August 2025	26 August 2025	First round	Second round	2	1	0	1	3	3	+0	50.00
Total					44	14	15	15	51	56	−5	31.82

Last updated: 6 April 2026
Source: Soccerway

=== Championship ===
==== League table ====
Pos	Team	Pld	W	D	L	GF	GA	GD	Pts
12	Bristol City	46	17	11	18	59	59	0	62
13	Sheffield United	46	18	6	22	66	66	0	60
14	Preston North End	46	15	15	16	55	62	−7	60
15	Queens Park Rangers	46	16	10	20	61	73	−12	58
16	Watford	46	14	15	17	53	65	−12	57

Source: EFL Official Website
Rules for classification: 1) Points; 2) Goal difference; 3) Number of goals scored; 4) Head-to-head results; 5) Wins; 6) Away goals; 7) Penalty points (sec 9.5); 8) Number of 12-point sending off offences; 9) Play-off (only if needed to determine promotion/relegation)

==== Results summary ====
Overall								Home						Away					
Pld	W	D	L	GF	GA	GD	Pts	W	D	L	GF	GA	GD	W	D	L	GF	GA	GD
46	15	15	16	55	62	−7	60	8	7	8	28	30	−2	7	8	8	27	32	−5

Last updated: complete.
Source: Soccerway

==== Results by round ====
Round	1	2	3	4	5	6	7	8	9	10	11	12	13	14	15	16	17	18	19	20	21	22	23	24	25	26	27	28	29	30	31	32	33	34	35	36	37	38	39	40	41	42	43	44	45	46
Ground	A	H	H	A	H	A	H	A	H	A	H	H	A	H	A	H	A	A	H	H	A	H	A	A	H	A	H	H	A	A	H	H	A	A	H	H	A	A	H	A	H	A	H	A	A	H
Result	D	W	W	L	D	W	D	D	W	L	L	W	W	W	D	L	D	W	D	D	W	D	D	L	W	W	L	L	L	D	W	D	L	D	L	L	L	L	W	D	D	W	L	L	W	L
Position	11	7	6	9	8	5	6	7	4	8	11	7	6	4	4	5	6	5	5	5	3	5	5	7	6	4	6	6	9	8	7	7	8	10	12	13	14	17	13	15	14	13	16	16	12	14
Points	1	4	7	7	8	11	12	13	16	16	16	19	22	25	26	26	27	30	31	32	35	36	37	37	40	43	43	43	43	44	47	48	48	49	49	49	49	49	52	53	54	57	57	57	60	60

Source: EFL
A = Away; H = Home; W = Win; D = Draw; L = Loss; P = Postponed

==== Matches ====
On 26 June, the Championship fixtures were announced, with Preston travelling to Queens Park Rangers on the opening weekend.

Win Draw Loss Fixtures

9 August 2025 1	Queens Park Rangers	1–1	Preston North End	Shepherd's Bush
15:00 BST	Whiteman 41' (o.g.)	Report	Osmajić 48'; Hughes (yellow card) 71'; Whiteman (yellow card) 84'; Lindsay (yellow card) 86'	Stadium: Loftus Road; Attendance: 16,804 (1,322 PNE fans); Referee: Oliver Langford

16 August 2025 2	Preston North End	2–1	Leicester City	Preston
15:00 BST	Devine 7'; Storey (yellow card) 74'; Osmajić 85', (yellow card) 85'	Report	Monga 67'	Stadium: Deepdale; Attendance: 16,797 (2,669 Leicester City fans); Referee: Gavin Ward

23 August 2025 3	Preston North End	1–0	Ipswich Town	Preston
15:00 BST	Osmajic 11' (pen.), (yellow card) 82'; Hughes (yellow card) 26'; Valentín (yellow card) 45+1'; Small (yellow card) 84'; Þórðarson (yellow card) 90+2'; McCann (yellow card) 90+5'	Report	Johnson (yellow card) 40'; McAteer (yellow card) 84'	Stadium: Deepdale; Attendance: 18,381; Referee: Matt Donohue

30 August 2025 4	Portsmouth	1–0	Preston North End	Milton
15:00 BST	Dozzell 41', (yellow card) 48'	Report	Storey (yellow card) 13'; Hughes (yellow card) 34'	Stadium: Fratton Park; Attendance: 20,226 (748 PNE fans); Referee: Tony Harrington

13 September 2025 5	Preston North End	2–2	Middlesbrough	Preston
12:30 BST	Dobbin 22'; Hughes (yellow card) 58'; Storey 88'	Report	Whittaker (yellow card) 8'; Jones (yellow card) 11'; Targett 72'; Hansen 90+2'; Lenihan (yellow card) 90+7'	Stadium: Deepdale; Attendance: 19,391; Referee: Thomas Kirk
Note: Fixture was originally scheduled for a 15:00 kick-off, but was moved live Sky Sports broadcasting.

20 September 2025 6	Derby County	0–1	Preston North End	Derby
15:00 BST	Sanderson (yellow card) 55'; Adams (yellow card) 75'	Report	Devine 29'; Iversen (yellow card) 72'; Smith (yellow card) 90+6'	Stadium: Pride Park; Attendance: 29,143 (1,817 PNE fans); Referee: Lewis Smith

27 September 2025 7	Preston North End	0–0	Bristol City	Preston
15:00 BST	Whiteman (yellow card) 36'; Hughes (yellow card) 57'; Armstrong (yellow card) 72'; Devine (yellow card) 75'	Report	Riis Jakobsen (yellow card) 30'	Stadium: Deepdale; Attendance: 15,295 (1,334 Bristol City fans); Referee: Bobby Madley

30 September 2025 8	Hull City	2–2	Preston North End	Kingston upon Hull
19:45 BST	McBurnie 48', 74'	Report	Small 3'; Smith 10'; Lindsay (yellow card) 51'	Stadium: MKM Stadium; Attendance: 18,624 (659 PNE fans); Referee: Josh Smith

4 October 2025 9	Preston North End	2–0	Charlton Athletic	Preston
15:00 BST	Small 67'; Jebbison 80'	Report	Gillesphey (yellow card) 38'; Berry (yellow card) 90+6'	Stadium: Deepdale; Attendance: 14,991 (1,296 Charlton fans); Referee: James Linington

18 October 2025 10	West Bromwich Albion	2–1	Preston North End	West Bromwich
15:00 BST	Phillips (yellow card) 10'; Johnston 40'; Price 62'; Mepham (yellow card) 66'	Report	Storey (yellow card) 65'; Smith 78'	Stadium: The Hawthorns; Attendance: 24,068 (1,998 PNE fans); Referee: Andrew Kitchen

21 October 2025 11	Preston North End	0–1	Birmingham City	Preston
19:45 BST	Smith (yellow card) 10'; Small (yellow card) 90+5'	Report	Osayi-Samuel (yellow card) 12'; Neumann 33'; Iwata (yellow card) 58'; Leonard (yellow card) 63'; Paik Seung-ho (yellow card) 90+5'	Stadium: Deepdale; Attendance: 16,857 (3,525 Birmingham fans); Referee: Lewis Smith

24 October 2025 12	Preston North End	3–2	Sheffield United	Preston
20:00 BST	Offiah (yellow card) 29'; Dobbin 45+4'; Tanganga 46' (o.g.); Jebbison 58'; Þórðarson (yellow card) 83'; Storey (yellow card) 85'; Armstrong (yellow card) 90+3'	Report	Brooks 10'; O'Hare 16'; Riedewald (yellow card) 34'	Stadium: Deepdale; Attendance: 16,542 (2,386 Sheffield United fans); Referee: Farai Hallam
Note: Fixture was initially scheduled for 25 October, but was moved for live Sky Sports broadcast.

1 November 2025 13	Southampton	0–2	Preston North End	Southampton
15:00 GMT	Manning (yellow card) 67'	Report	Dobbin 37'; Armstrong (yellow card) 41'; Small (yellow card) 66'; Offiah (yellow card) 83'; Frøkjær-Jensen 90+4'	Stadium: St Mary's Stadium; Attendance: 27,233; Referee: Matt Donohue

5 November 2025 14	Preston North End	2–1	Swansea City	Preston
19:45 GMT	Small 8', (yellow card) 61'; Whiteman (yellow card) 48'; Osmajić 49'; Hughes (yellow card) 82'	Report	Eom Ji-sung 80'; Samuels-Smith (yellow card) 90+2'	Stadium: Deepdale; Attendance: 15,911 (399 Swansea City fans); Referee: Anthony Backhouse

8 November 2025 15	Millwall	1–1	Preston North End	Bermondsey
12:30 GMT	Sturge (yellow card) 13'; Ivanović 36'; Cooper (yellow card) 69'	Report	Smith 15'; Whiteman (yellow card) 21'; Lindsay (yellow card) 87'	Stadium: The Den; Attendance: 15,788 (1,169 PNE fans); Referee: Stephen Martin
Note: Fixture was originally scheduled for a 15:00 kick-off, but was moved live Sky Sports broadcasting.

21 November 2025 16	Preston North End	1–2	Blackburn Rovers	Preston
20:00 GMT	Devine 45+1'; Whiteman (yellow card) 90+3'	Report	Miller 45'; Guðjohnsen 62'	Stadium: Deepdale; Attendance: 21,635; Referee: Paul Tierney
Note: Fixture was originally scheduled for 22 November, but was moved live Sky Sports broadcasting.

25 November 2025 17	Watford	1–1	Preston North End	Watford
19:45 GMT	Doumbia 45+1'; Kyprianou (yellow card) 71'; Irankunda (yellow card) 90+6'	Report	Jebbison 22'; Devine (yellow card) 37'; Hughes (yellow card) 84'; Þórðarson (yellow card) 87'; Lindsay (yellow card) 90+1'	Stadium: Vicarage Road; Attendance: 16,113 (515 PNE fans); Referee: James Bell

29 November 2025 18	Sheffield Wednesday	2–3	Preston North End	Sheffield
15:00 GMT	McNeill 3', 14', (penalty missed) 73'; Cadamarteri (yellow card) 70'	Report	Whiteman 10'; Offiah (yellow card) 34'; Dobbin 57'; Frøkjær-Jensen 76'	Stadium: Hillsborough Stadium; Attendance: 22,652 (2,376 PNE fans); Referee: Oliver Langford

6 December 2025 19	Preston North End	1–1	Wrexham	Preston
15:00 GMT	Devine (yellow card) 49'; Armstrong 81'	Report	Moore 4'; Okonkwo (yellow card) 63'	Stadium: Deepdale; Attendance: 17,842 (3,356 Wrexham fans); Referee: Lewis Smith

9 December 2025 20	Preston North End	1–1	Coventry City	Preston
19:45 GMT	Lindsay (red card); Jebbison (yellow card) 43', (goal) 76'		Hughes 70' (o.g.)	Stadium: Deepdale; Attendance: Ben Toner; Referee: 18,477

13 December 2025 21	Oxford United	1–2	Preston North End	Littlemore
12:30 GMT	Vaulks (yellow card) 43'; De Keersmaecker 53'	Report	Storey 26'; Jebbison 49', (yellow card) 78'; Whiteman (yellow card) 90'	Stadium: Kassam Stadium; Attendance: 10,379 (1,009 PNE fans); Referee: James Linington
Note: Fixture was originally scheduled for a 15:00 kick-off, but was moved live Sky Sports broadcasting.

20 December 2025 22	Preston North End	1–1	Norwich City	Preston
12:30 GMT	Whiteman (yellow card) 50'; Hughes (yellow card) 64'; Keane 90+6'		Wright (yellow card) 37'; Makama 85', (yellow card) 86'; Fisher (yellow card) 90+3'	Stadium: Deepdale; Attendance: 14,831; Referee: Stephen Martin
Note: Fixture was originally scheduled for a 15:00 kick-off, but was moved live Sky Sports broadcasting.

26 December 2025 23	Stoke City	0–0	Preston North End	Stoke-on-Trent
15:00 GMT	Wilmot (yellow card) 54'; Gibson (yellow card) 90+1'; Pearson (yellow card) 90+1'; Boženík (yellow card) 90+6'		Valentín (yellow card) 16'; McCann (yellow card) 62'	Stadium: bet365 Stadium; Attendance: 26,314; Referee: Thomas Kirk

29 December 2025 24	Wrexham	2–1	Preston North End	Wrexham
19:45 GMT	Broadhead 39'; Rathbone 77'	Report	Devine 84'	Stadium: STōK Cae Ras; Attendance: 10,616 (1,279 PNE fans); Referee: Reubyn Ricardo

1 January 2026 25	Preston North End	3–0	Sheffield Wednesday	Deepdale
15:00 GMT	McCann 28'; Storey (yellow card) 55'; Osmajić 61', (yellow card) 70'; Dobbin 85'	Report		Stadium: Deepdale; Attendance: 18,069; Referee: Gavin Ward

4 January 2026 26	Bristol City	0–2	Preston North End	Bristol
15:00 GMT	Knight (yellow card) 37'	Report	Dobbin 8'; Storey (yellow card) 30'; Thompson (yellow card) 69'; Devine 70'	Stadium: Ashton Gate; Attendance: 22,409 (737 PNE fans); Referee: Paul Tierney

17 January 2026 27	Preston North End	0–1	Derby County	Preston
15:00 GMT	Dobbin (yellow card) 66'; Thompson (yellow card) 87'	Report	Clark (yellow card) 38'; Ozoh (yellow card) 40'; Brereton Díaz (yellow card) 57'; Elder (yellow card) 63'; Agyemang 82'; Thompson (yellow card) 87'	Stadium: Deepdale; Attendance: 17,641 (3,616 Derby fans); Referee: Farai Hallam

20 January 2026 28	Preston North End	0–3	Hull City	Preston
19:45 GMT	Offiah (yellow card) 45+2'; Lewis (yellow card) 57'; Osmajić (red card) 90+5'	Report	Millar 33'; Famewo 45'; McBurnie 49'; Coyle (yellow card) 51'; Egan (yellow card) 59'; Lundstram (yellow card) 90+8'	Stadium: Deepdale; Attendance: 14,174 (860 Hull City fans); Referee: Stephen Martin

24 January 2026 29	Middlesbrough	4–0	Preston North End	Middlesbrough
12:30 GMT	Browne 9'; Conway 28', 54'; Whittaker 42'	Report	Whiteman (yellow card) 26'; Storey (red card) 50'; Thompson (yellow card) 82'	Stadium: Riverside Stadium; Attendance: 25,723; Referee: Andrew Madley
Note: Fixture was initially scheduled for a 15:00 kick-off, but was rescheduled for live Sky Sports broadcasting.

31 January 2026 30	Ipswich Town	1–1	Preston North End	Ipswich
15:00 GMT	Clarke (yellow card) 82', (goal) 90+2' (pen.)	Report	Thompson (yellow card) 33'; McCann (yellow card) 50'; Gibson 72'	Stadium: Portman Road; Attendance: 27,549; Referee: John Busby

7 February 2026 31	Preston North End	1–0	Portsmouth	Preston
15:00 GMT	Devine 40'; McCann (yellow card) 71'; Thompson (yellow card) 89'; Cornell (yellow card) 90'	Report	Alese (yellow card) 90'	Stadium: Deepdale; Attendance: 16,034 (1,785 Portsmouth fans); Referee: Adam Herczeg

14 February 2026 32	Preston North End	2–2	Watford	Preston
15:00 GMT	Dobbin 19'; Osmajić 70'; Gibson (yellow card) 81'	Report	Maamma 55'; Offiah 57' (o.g.); Petris (yellow card) 89'	Stadium: Deepdale; Attendance: 14,611 (927 Watford fans); Referee: Dean Whitestone

20 February 2026 33	Blackburn Rovers	1–0	Preston North End	Blackburn
20:00 GMT	Carter (yellow card) 40'; Cashin (yellow card) 90+1'; Ōhashi 90+5'	Report	Lang (yellow card) 70'; Small (yellow card) 90+7'	Stadium: Ewood Park; Attendance: 19,792; Referee: Anthony Backhouse
Note: Fixture was initially scheduled for 21 February, but was rescheduled for live Sky Sports broadcasting.

24 February 2026 34	Swansea City	1–1	Preston North End	Landore
19:45 GMT	Tymon (yellow card) 56'; Key (yellow card) 82'; Cullen 90+5'	Report	Jebbison 26'; Dobbin (yellow card) 64'; McCann (yellow card) 88'	Stadium: Swansea.com Stadium; Attendance: 20,233; Referee: David Webb

28 February 2026 35	Preston North End	0–2	Millwall	Preston
15:00 GMT	Lang (yellow card) 65'; Gibson (yellow card) 74'; Hughes (yellow card) 78'	Report	Leonard 29', (yellow card) 57'; De Norre (yellow card) 80'; Cundle 90+2'	Stadium: Deepdale; Attendance: 15,489 (1,668 Millwall fans); Referee: Ben Toner

6 March 2026 36	Preston North End	1–3	Oxford United	Preston
20:00 GMT	Osmajić 12'; Storey (yellow card) 90+4'	Report	Helik 5'; Brown (yellow card) 22', (goal) 61'; Lankshear 55'	Stadium: Deepdale; Attendance: 14,009 (576 Oxford fans); Referee: Andrew Kitchen
Note: Fixture was originally scheduled for 7 March, but was moved for live Sky Sports broadcasting.

11 March 2026 37	Coventry City	3–0	Preston North End	Foleshill
20:00 GMT	Sakamoto 17'; Thomas-Asante 34'; Grimes 50' (pen.)	Report		Stadium: Coventry Building Society Arena; Attendance: 27,835; Referee: Lewis Smith
Note: Fixture was originally scheduled for a 19:45 kick-off, but was pushed back fifteen minutes for Sky Sports broadcasting.

14 March 2026 38	Norwich City	2–0	Preston North End	Norwich
15:00 GMT	Ben Slimane (yellow card) 13'; Ahmed 17'; McLean 39'	Report	Potts (yellow card) 87'	Stadium: Carrow Road; Attendance: 25,285 (371 PNE fans); Referee: Gavin Ward

20 March 2026 39	Preston North End	3–1	Stoke City	Preston
20:00 GMT	Devine 15', 60', (yellow card) 26'; Whiteman (yellow card) 34'; Osmajić 57'	Report	Thomas 4'; Manhoef (yellow card) 39'	Stadium: Deepdale; Attendance: 16,604 (3,148 Stoke City fans); Referee: Farai Hallam
Note: Fixture was initially scheduled for 21 March, but was rearranged for Sky Sports broadcasting.

3 April 2026 40	Leicester City	2–2	Preston North End	Leicester
15:00 BST	Daka 4', 81'	Report	Moran (yellow card) 15', (goal) 38'; Hughes (yellow card) 21'; Whiteman 45'; Lindsay (yellow card) 57'; Storey (yellow card) 64'	Stadium: King Power Stadium; Attendance: 28,787; Referee: Benjamin Speedie

6 April 2026 41	Preston North End	1–1	Queens Park Rangers	Preston
15:00 BST	Potts 46'; Gibson (yellow card) 76'	Report	Varane (yellow card) 13'; Morgan (yellow card) 65'; Small 82' (o.g.); Clarke-Salter (yellow card) 90+1'	Stadium: Deepdale; Attendance: 15,046; Referee: Tom Kirk

11 April 2026 42	Charlton Athletic	1–2	Preston North End	Charlton
15:00 BST	Rankin-Costello 18'; Jones (yellow card) 33'; Dykes (yellow card) 55'	Report	Dobbin 25'; Potts 65'; Offiah (yellow card) 68'; Whiteman (yellow card) 71'; Iversen (yellow card) 90+4'	Stadium: The Valley; Attendance: 18,902 (2,101 PNE fans); Referee: John Busby

18 April 2026 43	Preston North End	0–2	West Bromwich Albion	Preston
15:00 BST		Report	Maja 11'; Dike 77'	Stadium: Deepdale; Attendance: 17,996 (3,952 West Brom fans); Referee: Josh Smith

22 April 2026 44	Birmingham City	2–1	Preston North End	Birmingham
19:45 BST	Stansfield 10'; Osman 16'	Report	Hughes 25'; Vukčević (yellow card) 45+2'; Moran (yellow card) 72'	Stadium: St Andrew's; Attendance: 23,789; Referee: Ben Toner

25 April 2026 45	Sheffield United	2–3	Preston North End	Sheffield
15:00 BST	Hamer 71' (pen.); Bamford 82'	Report	Lindsay 5', 20'; Thompson (yellow card) 16'; Vukčević (yellow card) 32'; Dobbin 76'; Iversen (yellow card) 82'	Stadium: Bramall Lane; Attendance: 27,115; Referee: Andrew Kitchen

2 May 2026 46	Preston North End	1–3	Southampton	Preston
12:30 BST	Storey (yellow card) 10'; Moran (yellow card) 34'; Dobbin 60'; Vukčević (yellow card) 90+4'	Report	Harwood-Bellis 12'; Stewart 47'; Azaz (yellow card) 81'; Larin 90+1'	Stadium: Deepdale; Attendance: 20,085 (5,419 Southampton); Referee: Stephen Martin

=== FA Cup ===
Preston were drawn at home to Wigan Athletic in the third round.

Win Draw Loss Fixtures

9 January 2026 Third round	Preston North End	0–1	Wigan Athletic	Preston
19:30 GMT		Report	Costelloe (yellow card) 71'; Bettoni 75'	Stadium: Deepdale; Attendance: 14,366; Referee: Oliver Langford

=== EFL Cup ===
Preston were drawn away to Barrow in the first round and then at home to Wrexham in the second round.

Win Draw Loss Fixtures

12 August 2025 First round	Barrow	0–1	Preston North End	Barrow-in-Furness
19:30 BST	Newby (yellow card) 81'	Report	Raglan 66' (o.g.)	Stadium: Holker Street; Attendance: 3,108 (938 PNE fans); Referee: Ross Joyce

26 August 2025 Second round	Preston North End	2–3	Wrexham	Preston
19:45 BST	Dobbin 7'; Lindsay 32'; Vukčević (yellow card) 82'	Report	Hardie 11'; Ashfield 59'; Lee (yellow card) 85'; Moore 90+2'	Stadium: Deepdale; Attendance: 12,350 (2,557 Wrexham fans); Referee: Adam Herczeg

== Statistics ==
=== Appearances and goals ===
As of match played 2 May 2026

Players with no appearances are not included on the list; italics indicate a loaned in player

No.	Pos	Nat	Player	Total		Championship		FA Cup		EFL Cup	
No.	Pos	Nat	Player	Apps	Goals	Apps	Goals	Apps	Goals	Apps	Goals
1	GK	(Denmark) DEN	Daniel Iversen	37	0	36+0	0	1+0	0	0+0	0
2	DF	(Spain) ESP	Pol Valentín	36	0	22+11	0	1+0	0	2+0	0
3	DF	(Montenegro) MNE	Andrija Vukčević	31	0	16+13	0	0+0	0	2+0	0
4	MF	(England) ENG	Benjamin Whiteman	45	2	43+0	2	0+0	0	0+2	0
6	DF	(Scotland) SCO	Liam Lindsay	28	3	17+9	2	1+0	0	1+0	1
7	FW	(Republic of Ireland) IRL	Will Keane	2	1	0+2	1	0+0	0	0+0	0
8	MF	(Northern Ireland) NIR	Ali McCann	28	1	20+6	1	1+0	0	0+1	0
9	FW	(Canada) CAN	Daniel Jebbison	40	6	22+16	6	1+0	0	1+0	0
10	FW	(England) ENG	Callum Lang	5	0	3+2	0	0+0	0	0+0	0
11	DF	(Republic of Ireland) IRL	Robbie Brady	5	0	0+5	0	0+0	0	0+0	0
12	GK	(England) ENG	Jack Walton	5	0	3+0	0	0+0	0	2+0	0
13	GK	(Wales) WAL	David Cornell	8	0	7+1	0	0+0	0	0+0	0
14	DF	(England) ENG	Jordan Storey	45	2	42+1	2	1+0	0	0+1	0
15	MF	(Northern Ireland) NIR	Jordan Thompson	21	0	10+10	0	1+0	0	0+0	0
16	DF	(Wales) WAL	Andrew Hughes	41	1	37+1	1	0+1	0	1+1	0
17	FW	(England) ENG	Lewis Dobbin	41	11	33+6	10	1+0	0	1+0	1
18	DF	(Northern Ireland) NIR	Jamal Lewis	14	0	6+8	0	0+0	0	0+0	0
19	DF	(England) ENG	Lewis Gibson	29	1	25+2	1	1+0	0	1+0	0
20	MF	(England) ENG	Theo Carroll	2	0	0+0	0	0+0	0	2+0	0
21	MF	(England) ENG	Alfie Devine	48	8	36+9	8	0+1	0	2+0	0
22	FW	(Serbia) SRB	Miloš Luković	1	0	1+0	0	0+0	0	0+0	0
23	MF	(Republic of Ireland) IRL	Andrew Moran	11	1	7+4	1	0+0	0	0+0	0
24	FW	(England) ENG	Michael Smith	40	3	13+24	3	0+1	0	0+2	0
26	DF	(England) ENG	Thierry Small	44	3	27+14	3	1+0	0	0+2	0
28	FW	(Montenegro) MNE	Milutin Osmajić	31	8	20+8	8	0+1	0	1+1	0
35	MF	(England) ENG	Noah Mawene	1	0	0+1	0	0+0	0	0+0	0
42	DF	(England) ENG	Odeluga Offiah	44	0	30+12	0	0+0	0	2+0	0
44	MF	(England) ENG	Brad Potts	17	2	10+6	2	0+1	0	0+0	0
Players who featured but departed the club during the season:
5	MF	(England) ENG	Harrison Armstrong	17	1	13+4	1	0+0	0	0+0	0
10	MF	(Denmark) DEN	Mads Frøkjær-Jensen	20	2	2+16	2	1+0	0	1+0	0
22	MF	(Iceland) ISL	Stefán Teitur Þórðarson	17	0	6+9	0	0+0	0	2+0	0
23	FW	(Denmark) DEN	Jeppe Okkels	1	0	0+0	0	0+0	0	1+0	0
