= Thierry Small =

English footballer (born 2004)

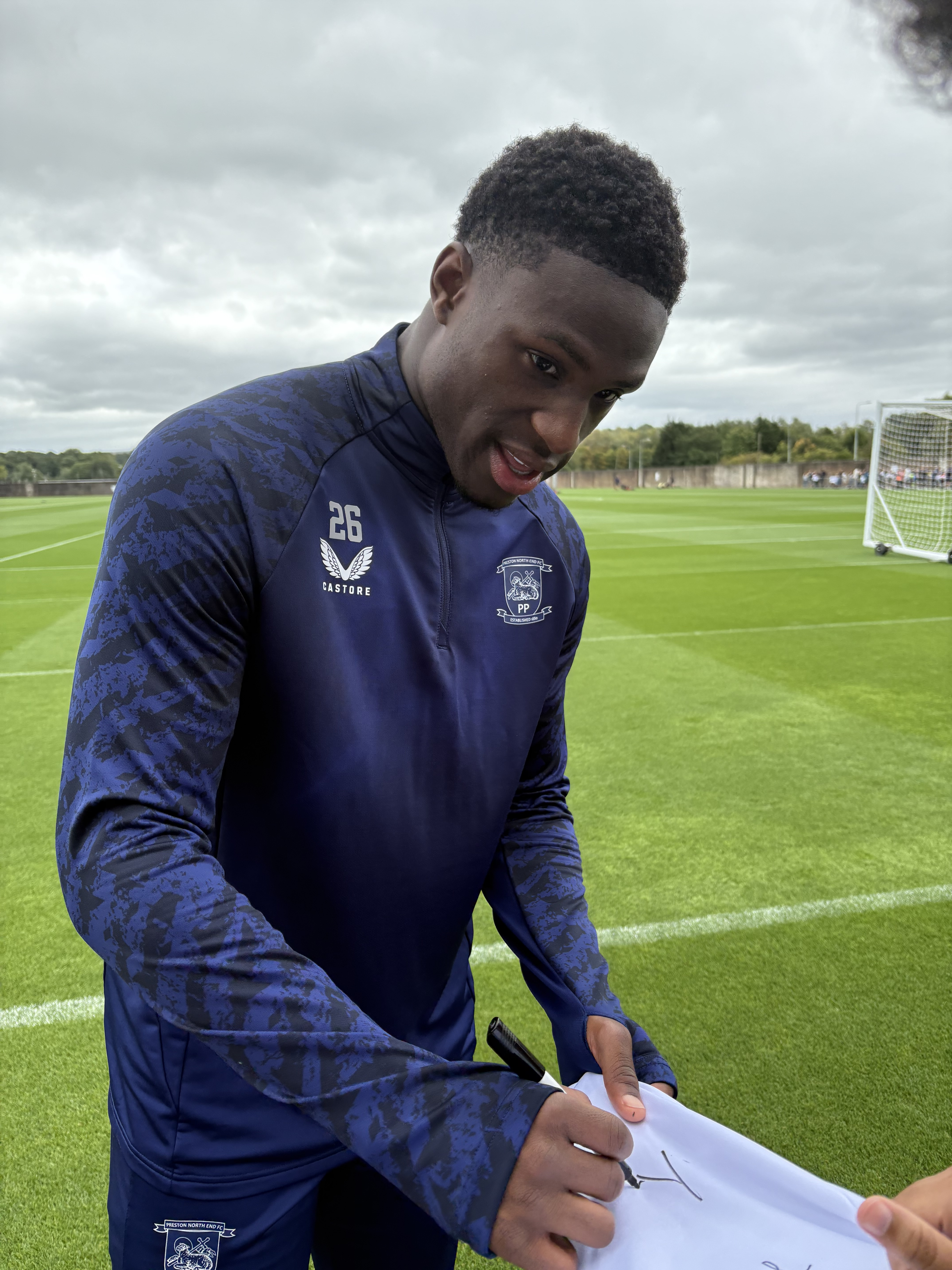
- Small in 2025

Personal information
- Full name: Thierry Small
- Date of birth: 1 August 2004 (age 22)
- Place of birth: Solihull, England
- Height: 5 ft 10 in (1.77 m)
- Position: Left-back

Team information
- Current team: Preston North End
- Number: 11

Youth career
- 2011–2016: West Bromwich Albion
- 2016–2021: Everton

Senior career*
Years	Team	Apps	(Gls)
2021	Everton	0	(0)
2021–2024	Southampton	0	(0)
2022	→ Port Vale (loan)	4	(0)
2023	→ St Mirren (loan)	14	(0)
2023–2024	→ St Mirren (loan)	5	(0)
2024–2025	Charlton Athletic	53	(3)
2025–	Preston North End	49	(3)

International career^{‡}
2021	England U17	1	(0)
2022	England U18	3	(0)
2024	England U20	1	(0)
2025–	England U21	2	(0)
- * Club domestic league appearances and goals as of 17:10, 15 October 2026 (UTC) ‡ National team caps and goals as of 22:10, 14 November 2025 (UTC)

Thierry Small (born 1 August 2004) is an English footballer who plays as a left-back for EFL Championship club Preston North End.

Small became the youngest player in Everton's history in January 2021, aged 16 years and 176 days, but turned professional with Southampton shortly after turning 17. He spent the 2022–23 season on loan at EFL League One side Port Vale and Scottish Premiership club St Mirren, returning to St Mirren on loan for the 2023–24 campaign. He joined Charlton Athletic permanently in February 2024 and helped the club to win the 2025 EFL League One play-offs. He left Charlton to join Preston North End at the end of the 2024–25 season.

== Early life ==
Thierry Small was born in Solihull on 1 August 2004. He was named after Arsenal legend Thierry Henry. Small is of Jamaican, Kittitian, and Panamanian descent. He has a Panamanian grandfather. Small's uncle, Bryan Small, was a professional footballer who played for Aston Villa in the Premier League and other Football League clubs. His cousin, Ethon Archer, also plays football professionally.

== Club career ==
=== Everton ===
Small spent time at West Bromwich Albion before joining the academy at Everton at the age of 11. He made his first-team debut for Everton on 24 January 2021, coming on as a late substitute in a 3–0 FA Cup win over Sheffield Wednesday at Goodison Park. In doing so, he became the youngest player in Everton history at the age of 16 years and 176 days, breaking Jose Baxter's 2008 record by 15 days. However, he feared not getting game-time under Carlo Ancelotti, with Lucas Digne and Niels Nkounkou ahead of him in the first-team pecking order, and subsequently rejected the opportunity to turn professional at Everton at the age of 17 and instead became a free agent. Everton coach David Unsworth said that "we made him an unbelievable offer... but when a player doesn't want to be at your club, it's very difficult to try and keep him".

=== Southampton ===
On 24 August 2021, Small signed for Southampton on a three-year contract. Everton rejected Southampton's offer of £1.5 million compensation, leaving the case to be decided by a tribunal. Manager Ralph Hasenhüttl stated that "we have already signed a player this summer with good experience at left-back in Romain Perraud, and Thierry's arrival now gives us a very good balance and a strong additional option in that position". He scored for the under-21 team in their 4–0 victory at Crawley Town in the EFL Trophy on 9 November. He went on to be shortlisted for the November 2021 Premier League 2 Player of the Month award. He made his first-team debut for the club in the FA Cup on 5 February 2022, in a 2–1 win over Coventry City at St Mary's. On 1 February 2024, Small left the club following the mutual termination of his contract.

==== Loan to Port Vale ====
On 26 July 2022, Small joined EFL League One club Port Vale on a season-long loan deal. Manager Darrell Clarke experimented by playing him as a forward in the Staffordshire Senior Cup. He continued to play for the Southampton youth team after not making the matchday squads at Vale Park. He was recalled to Southampton by new manager Nathan Jones on 11 November, with Clarke admitting that "for various reasons, he hasn't played the minutes that we would have liked" as the Vale had Mal Benning, Dan Jones and Liam McCarron to compete for the left-wing-back position.

==== Loans to St Mirren ====
On 31 January 2023, Small joined Scottish Premiership club St Mirren on loan for the rest of the 2022–23 season. Manager Stephen Robinson said that his arrival would provide competition for Scott Tanser on the left-hand side. On 22 April, he was sent off for receiving two yellow cards in the space of 14 seconds during a 2–0 defeat to Kilmarnock at St Mirren Park; the first yellow was for dissent and the second was for a shirt pull. On 24 May, he was shown a straight red card for a dangerous challenge on Bojan Miovski in a 3–0 defeat at Aberdeen.

On 26 August 2023, Small rejoined St Mirren on a season-long loan. On 3 January 2024, he was recalled to Southampton after six appearances during his second loan spell.

=== Charlton Athletic ===
On 2 February 2024, Small joined League One club Charlton Athletic on a contract to run until the end of the 2023–24 season, with a club option of an additional year. Small scored on his Charlton debut on 17 February 2024, in a 3–3 draw at Bolton Wanderers.

The club confirmed in May that they had triggered the one-year extension clause in Small's contract. Technical director Andy Scott said that a "long-term" contract offer had also been made. On 25 January 2025, Small scored the only goal of the game against Shrewsbury Town at The Valley, describing the feeling as "unbelievable". It was subsequently reported that Preston North End were closely monitoring his progress after he played well against them in the FA Cup. He was linked with Millwall in April 2025, though Charlton manager Nathan Jones (who also managed Small at Southampton) stated that the club had had "no contact from anyone" regarding the player, whose contract was due to expire in the summer. Charlton went on to win the League One play-offs with Small starting in the final as the Addicks defeated Leyton Orient 1–0 at Wembley Stadium.

=== Preston North End ===
On 6 June 2025, it was announced that Small would join Championship club Preston North End on a four-year deal upon the expiration of his contract at Charlton Athletic, who received compensation from Preston. He was played at wing-back and said the coaching at Deepdale had improved him as a player. Small scored his first goal for Preston in the third minute of a Championship match away at Hull City on 30 September, firing a low strike into the corner shortly after kick‑off. He continued his scoring form with a 67th‑minute goal in a 2–0 home victory over Charlton Athletic on 4 October. He then scored another early goal in the eighth minute in a home league match versus Swansea City on 5 November, opening the scoring with a powerful strike from distance. He was racially abused after scoring an own goal in a draw with Queens Park Rangers on 6 April. He played 44 games in the 2025–26 season, scoring three goals.

== International career ==
Small has represented England at youth international level. He appeared as a second-half substitute for the under-17 side in a friendly against Watford under-23s in March 2021. He made his debut for England U18s on 7 June 2022, during a 3–2 victory over Austria in Croatia. This was the first of three games he played in a four-team mini-tournament that England won. On 10 November 2024, Small was called up to the under-20 squad. He made his debut for the U20s on 15 November 2024, during a 4–0 victory over Germany. On 29 August 2025, Small was called up to the under-21s for the first time. He made his England U21 debut as a substitute on 10 October 2025 during a 4–0 victory away to Moldova.

== Style of play ==
Small is a left-back with good ball-striking ability and stamina. He can also play in central defence, right-back or on the left wing.

== Career statistics ==
As of match played 13 October 2026

Appearances and goals by club, season and competition
Club	Season	League			National cup (Note: Includes FA Cup, Scottish Cup)		League cup (Note: Includes EFL Cup, Scottish League Cup)		Other		Total	
Club	Season	Division	Apps	Goals	Apps	Goals	Apps	Goals	Apps	Goals	Apps	Goals
Everton	2020–21	Premier League	0	0	1	0	0	0	0	0	1	0
Southampton	2021–22	Premier League	0	0	1	0	0	0	—		1	0
Southampton	2022–23	Premier League	0	0	0	0	0	0	—		0	0
Southampton	2023–24	Championship	0	0	0	0	0	0	—		0	0
Southampton	Total		0	0	1	0	0	0	0	0	1	0
Southampton U21	2021–22	—	—		—		—		1 (Note: Appearance(s) in EFL Trophy)	1	1	1
Port Vale (loan)	2022–23	League One	4	0	0	0	1	0	3	0	8	0
St Mirren (loan)	2022–23	Scottish Premiership	14	0	1	0	0	0	0	0	15	0
St Mirren (loan)	2023–24	Scottish Premiership	5	0	0	0	1	0	0	0	6	0
St Mirren (loan)	Total		19	0	1	0	1	0	0	0	21	0
Charlton Athletic	2023–24	League One	14	1	—		—		—		14	1
Charlton Athletic	2024–25	League One	39	2	3	0	1	0	5 (Note: Two appearances in the EFL Trophy and three appearances in the League One play-offs)	0	48	2
Charlton Athletic	Total		53	3	3	0	1	0	5	0	62	3
Preston North End	2025–26	Championship	41	3	1	0	2	0	—		44	3
Preston North End	2026–27	Championship	8	0	0	0	1	0	—		9	0
Preston North End	Total		49	3	1	0	3	0	0	0	53	3
Career total			125	6	7	0	6	0	9	1	147	7

== Honours ==
Charlton Athletic

- EFL League One play-offs: 2025
