= Andrija Vukčević =

Montenegrin footballer (born 1996)

- Vukčević with Preston North End in 2026

Personal information
- Full name: Andrija Vukčević
- Date of birth: 11 October 1996 (age 30)
- Place of birth: Podgorica, Montenegro, FR Yugoslavia
- Height: 1.80 m (5 ft 11 in)
- Position: Left back

Team information
- Current team: Preston North End
- Number: 3

Youth career
- –2013: Budućnost

Senior career*
Years	Team	Apps	(Gls)
2013–2016	Budućnost	70	(3)
2016–2017	Sevilla B	4	(0)
2017	→ San Fernando (loan)	9	(0)
2017–2019	Spartak Subotica	50	(1)
2019–2021	Waasland-Beveren	20	(0)
2021–2023	Rijeka	71	(1)
2023–2025	Juárez	21	(1)
2024–2025	→ Cartagena (loan)	23	(0)
2025–	Preston North End	42	(0)

International career^{‡}
2012	Montenegro U17	3	(0)
2013–2015	Montenegro U19	11	(0)
2014–2018	Montenegro U21	13	(0)
2022–	Montenegro	23	(0)
- * Club domestic league appearances and goals as of 19:36, 12 November 2026 (UTC) ‡ National team caps and goals as of 31 March 2026

Andrija Vukčević (Cyrillic: Андрија Вукчевић, born 11 October 1996) is a Montenegrin professional footballer who plays as a left back for EFL Championship club Preston North End and the Montenegro national team.

== Club career ==
=== Budućnost ===
Vukčević represented Budućnost Podgorica as a youth, and was promoted to the first team in June 2013. On 11 August he made his senior debut at the age of 17, starting in a 1–1 home draw against Mladost Podgorica.

Vukčević scored his first goal as a senior on 19 October 2013, netting the first in a 1–2 away loss against Čelik Nikšić. He finished the campaign as an undisputed starter, contributing with two goals in 30 appearances as his side achieved a UEFA Europa League spot.

Vukčević made his European debut on 3 July 2014, playing the full 90 minutes in a 2–1 win at Sanmarinese club Folgore Falciano.

=== Sevilla ===
On 14 January 2016 Vukčević moved to Sevilla, signing a three-and-a-half-year deal and being immediately assigned to the reserves in Segunda División B. He appeared in four matches during the season, as the B-side achieved promotion to Segunda División.

On 23 January 2017, after failing to feature in any appearances for the first half of the campaign, Vukčević was loaned to third division side San Fernando until June.

=== Spartak Subotica ===
In the summer of 2017, he joined Serbian club Spartak Subotica.

=== Waasland-Beveren ===
On 26 July 2019, Vukčević signed a four-year contract with Belgian club Waasland-Beveren in a €250,000 transfer from Spartak Subotica. There he became teammates with fellow countryman Stefan Milošević.

=== Rijeka ===
On 5 February 2021, Vukčević joined HNL Club HNK Rijeka for an undisclosed fee. He would spend 2 years there, appearing in 71 matches and scoring a single goal.

=== Juárez ===
After two years in Croatia, on the 13th of September 2023, HNK Rijeka would sell Vukčević to Liga MX club FC Juárez for a fee of €1,000,000. On 17 July 2024, he returned to Spain after agreeing to a one-year loan deal with FC Cartagena in the second division.

=== Preston North End ===
On 25 July 2025, following the expiry of his Juárez contract, Vukčević signed a three year contract with EFL Championship club Preston North End.

== International career ==
Vukčević represented Montenegro at under-17, under-19 and under-21 levels.

On 4 June 2022, Vukčević made his debut of the Montenegro senior team in a 2–0 victory over Romania in the 2022–23 UEFA Nations League B.

== Career statistics ==
=== Club ===
As of match played 7 November 2026

Appearances and goals by club, season and competition
Club	Season	League			National cup (Note: Includes Montenegrin Cup, Copa del Rey, Serbian Cup, Belgian Cup, Croatian Football Cup, Copa MX, FA Cup)		League cup (Note: Includes EFL Cup)		Continental		Other		Total	
Club	Season	Division	Apps	Goals	Apps	Goals	Apps	Goals	Apps	Goals	Apps	Goals	Apps	Goals
Budućnost	2013–14	Montenegrin First League	30	2	0	0	—		0	0	—		30	2
Budućnost	2014–15	Montenegrin First League	25	1	0	0	—		4 (Note: Appearances in UEFA Europa League)	0	—		29	1
Budućnost	2015–16	Montenegrin First League	15	0	4	0	—		2	0	—		21	0
Budućnost	Total		70	3	4	0	—		6	0	—		80	3
Sevilla B	2015–16	Segunda División B	4	0	0	0	—		—		—		4	0
Sevilla B	2016–17	Segunda División	0	0	0	0	—		—		—		0	0
Sevilla B	Total		4	0	0	0	—		—		—		4	0
San Fernando (loan)	2016–17	Segunda División B	9	0	0	0	—		—		—		9	0
Spartak Subotica	2017–18	Serbian SuperLiga	25	0	1	0	—		—		—		26	0
Spartak Subotica	2018–19	Serbian SuperLiga	25	1	3	0	—		6	0	—		34	1
Spartak Subotica	Total		50	1	4	0	—		6	0	—		69	1
Waasland-Beveren	2019–20	Belgian Pro League	11	0	1	0	—		—		—		12	0
Waasland-Beveren	2020–21	Belgian Pro League	9	0	1	0	—		—		—		10	0
Waasland-Beveren	Total		20	0	2	0	—		—		—		22	0
Rijeka	2020–21	HNL	13	0	1	0	—		—		—		14	0
Rijeka	2021–22	HNL	33	1	3	0	—		6 (Note: Appearances in UEFA Europa Conference League)	0	—		42	1
Rijeka	2022–23	HNL	26	0	1	0	—		2	0	—		29	0
Rijeka	2023–24	HNL	1	0	0	0	—		3	0	—		4	0
Rijeka	Total		73	1	5	0	—		11	0	—		89	0
Juárez	2023–24	Liga MX	21	1	0	0	0	0	—		—		21	1
Juárez	2024–25	Liga MX	0	0	0	0	0	0	—		—		0	0
Juárez	Total		21	0	0	0	0	0	—		—		21	1
Cartagena (loan)	2024–25	Segunda División	23	0	1	0	—		—		—		24	0
Preston North End	2025–26	Championship	29	0	0	0	2	0	—		—		31	0
Preston North End	2026–27	Championship	13	0	0	0	2	0	—		—		15	0
Preston North End	Total		42	0	0	0	4	0	—		—		46	0
Career total			312	6	16	0	4	0	23	0	0	0	345	6

=== International ===
As of match played 31 March 2026

Appearances and goals by national team and year
National team	Year	Apps	Goals
Montenegro	2022	3	0
Montenegro	2023	4	0
Montenegro	2024	6	0
Montenegro	2025	8	0
Montenegro	2026	2	0
Total		23	0
