= Lewis Dobbin =

English footballer (born 2003)

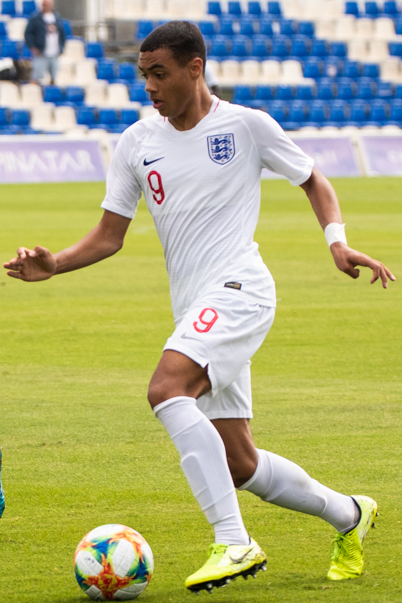
- Dobbin playing for England U17 in 2019

Personal information
- Full name: Lewis Norman Dobbin
- Date of birth: 3 January 2003 (age 23)
- Place of birth: Stoke-on-Trent, England
- Height: 5 ft 9 in (1.75 m)
- Positions: Forward; attacking midfielder

Team information
- Current team: Southampton
- Number: 11

Youth career
- 2014−2021: Everton

Senior career*
Years	Team	Apps	(Gls)
2021–2024	Everton	15	(1)
2022–2023	→ Derby County (loan)	43	(3)
2024–2026	Aston Villa	0	(0)
2024–2025	→ West Bromwich Albion (loan)	17	(0)
2025	→ Norwich City (loan)	10	(2)
2025–2026	→ Preston North End (loan)	39	(10)
2026–	Southampton	14	(1)

International career
2018–2019	England U16	8	(3)
2019–2020	England U17	10	(5)
2021	England U19	2	(0)
- * Club domestic league appearances and goals as of 15:43, 21 November 2026 (UTC)

Lewis Norman Dobbin (born 3 January 2003) is an English professional footballer who plays as a forward or attacking midfielder for EFL Championship club Southampton.

Dobbin is a product of the Everton academy and has represented England internationally at a number of youth levels up to under-19.

== Club career ==
=== Everton ===
Dobbin joined Everton at the age of 11. On 25 September 2021, Dobbin made his professional debut for Everton as a substitute for Alex Iwobi in a 2–0 home league win over Norwich City.

On 3 August 2022, Dobbin joined League One side Derby County on a season-long loan. On 9 November 2022, he missed the crucial fifth penalty in a shootout against Premier League club Liverpool in the third round of the EFL Cup, when his shot was saved by Caoimhín Kelleher. Derby went on to lose the shootout 3–2. Dobbin made 54 appearances during the season for Derby, with 43 coming in the league. He scored five goals in total with three coming in the league. At the end of the season, the loan expired and Dobbin returned to Everton.

On 26 August 2023, Dobbin made his first league start for Everton in a 1–0 defeat against Wolverhampton Wanderers. He scored his first goal for Everton on 10 December in a 2–0 home win against Chelsea.

=== Aston Villa ===
On 23 June 2024, Dobbin signed for fellow Premier League club Aston Villa for an undisclosed fee, reported to be £9m or £10m.

On 6 August 2024, Dobbin signed for Championship club West Bromwich Albion on a season-long loan. Aston Villa recalled Dobbin from the loan on 1 January 2025, after Dobbin had made 17 appearances in the Championship, but only one start.

On 3 January 2025, Dobbin returned to the Championship, joining Norwich City on loan for the remainder of the season.

On 22 August 2025, Dobbin joined Preston North End on a season-long loan.

=== Southampton ===
On 15 July 2026, Dobbin joined Southampton on a four-year contract for an undisclosed fee, reported to be £9 million. He made his debut for the club on 8 August in a 2–0 away victory against Colchester United in the EFL Cup. On 24 October, Dobbin scored his first goal for the club in a 3–2 away victory against West Ham United.

== International career ==
In October 2019 Dobbin scored for the England under-17 team in a draw against Germany and the following month he scored again in a defeat at home to Denmark. In February 2020 Dobbin scored against Russia and then twice against Ukraine.

On 6 October 2021, Dobbin made his England U19s debut during a 3–1 defeat to France in Marbella.

== Personal life ==
Born in Stoke-on-Trent, Staffordshire, Dobbin is of Nigerian descent through his father and also has Jamaican descent through his mother.

== Career statistics ==
As of match played 21 November 2026

Appearances and goals by club, season and competition
Club	Season	League			FA Cup		EFL Cup		Europe		Other		Total	
Club	Season	Division	Apps	Goals	Apps	Goals	Apps	Goals	Apps	Goals	Apps	Goals	Apps	Goals
Everton	2021–22	Premier League	3	0	2	0	0	0	—		—		5	0
Everton	2023–24	Premier League	12	1	1	0	2	0	—		—		15	1
Everton	Total		15	1	3	0	2	0	—		—		20	1
Derby County (loan)	2022–23	League One	43	3	5	1	3	0	—		3 (Note: Appearances in EFL Trophy)	1	54	5
Aston Villa	2025–26	Premier League	0	0	—		—		—		—		0	0
West Bromwich Albion (loan)	2024–25	Championship	17	0	—		1	0	—		—		18	0
Norwich City (loan)	2024–25	Championship	10	2	1	0	—		—		—		11	2
Preston North End (loan)	2025–26	Championship	39	10	1	0	1	1	—		—		41	11
Southampton	2026–27	Championship	14	1	0	0	2	0	—		—		16	1
Career total			138	17	10	1	9	1	0	0	3	1	160	20
