= Odel Offiah =

English footballer (born 2002)

- Offiah with Preston North End in 2026

Personal information
- Full name: Odeluga Joshua Offiah
- Date of birth: 26 October 2002 (age 24)
- Place of birth: Camden, England
- Height: 6 ft 2 in (1.87 m)
- Position: Defender

Team information
- Current team: Preston North End
- Number: 42

Youth career
- –2017: Bromley
- 2017–2023: Brighton & Hove Albion

Senior career*
Years	Team	Apps	(Gls)
2021–2025	Brighton & Hove Albion	6	(0)
2023	→ Heart of Midlothian (loan)	5	(0)
2024–2025	→ Blackpool (loan)	40	(1)
2025–	Preston North End	43	(0)
- * Club domestic league appearances and goals as of 04:04, 24 August 2026 (UTC)

Odeluga Joshua Offiah (born 26 October 2002) is an English professional footballer who plays as a right-back or centre-back for EFL Championship club Preston North End.

== Club career ==
=== Brighton & Hove Albion ===
In his youth, Offiah was a member of the Bromley academy, and in 2016 won the Kent Youth Cup with their U13 side before joining Brighton & Hove Albion's academy in 2017.

Offiah made his professional footballing debut on 24 August 2021, coming on as a 68th minute substitute for Taylor Richards in the 2–0 EFL Cup second round victory over Championship side Cardiff City. He made his first start for the "Seagulls" on 8 January 2022, playing 55 minutes of the 2–1 – after extra-time – away win over West Bromwich Albion of the Championship in the FA Cup third round. On 31 January, Offiah committed his future with Brighton by signing a new contract that runs until June 2024.

Offiah was among the substitutes in Brighton's FA Cup semi-final against Manchester United at Wembley on 23 April 2023, where he remained on the bench in the eventual penalty shootout defeat. He made his Premier League debut and first professional league match of his career three days later, coming on as 88th minute substitute for Albion goalscorer Facundo Buonanotte in the 3–1 away loss at Nottingham Forest.

He made his first ever Premier League start vs Bournemouth on 28 April 2024.

On 9 June 2025, Offiah extended his contract with Brighton until 30 June 2026.

==== Heart of Midlothian (loan) ====
On 18 August 2023, Offiah signed a new contract with Brighton running until June 2025, whilst signing a season-long loan with Heart of Midlothian of the Scottish Premiership. He made a goalscoring debut two days after signing, with a powerful header crashing in off the underside of the crossbar, scoring Hearts' second in the eventual 4–0 home win over Scottish Championship side Partick Thistle in the Scottish League Cup second round. Offiah returned to Brighton in December 2023 following the termination of his loan spell.

==== Blackpool (loan) ====
On 30 August 2024, it was announced that Offiah would join EFL League One club Blackpool on a season-long loan.

=== Preston North End ===
On 5 July 2025, Offiah joined EFL Championship club Preston North End on a permanent deal, signing a four-year contract.

== Personal life ==
Offiah was born in Camden to Nigerian parents. He is the nephew of former rugby league and rugby union player Martin Offiah and cousin of Tyler Offiah.

== Career statistics ==
As of match played 22 August 2026

Appearances and goals by club, season and competition
Club	Season	League			National cup (Note: Includes FA Cup, Scottish Cup)		League cup (Note: Includes EFL Cup, Scottish League Cup)		Continental		Other		Total	
Club	Season	Division	Apps	Goals	Apps	Goals	Apps	Goals	Apps	Goals	Apps	Goals	Apps	Goals
Brighton & Hove Albion	2021-22	Premier League	0	0	1	0	1	0	—		—		2	0
Brighton & Hove Albion	2022-23	Premier League	2	0	0	0	1	0	—		—		3	0
Brighton & Hove Albion	2023-24	Premier League	4	0	0	0	0	0	0	0	—		4	0
Brighton & Hove Albion	2024-25	Premier League	0	0	0	0	1	0	—		—		1	0
Brighton & Hove Albion	Total		6	0	1	0	3	0	0	0	—		10	0
Brighton & Hove Albion U21	2021-22	—			—		—		—		3 (Note: Appearance(s) in EFL Trophy)	0	3	0
Brighton & Hove Albion U21	2022-23	—			—		—		—		1	0	1	0
Brighton & Hove Albion U21	2024-25	—			—		—		—		1	0	1	0
Brighton & Hove Albion U21	Total		—		—		—		—		5	0	5	0
Heart of Midlothian (loan)	2023-24	Scottish Premiership	5	0	0	0	2	1	2 (Note: Appearance(s) in UEFA Europa Conference League)	0	—		9	1
Blackpool (loan)	2024-25	League One	40	1	2	0	0	0	—		0	0	42	1
Preston North End	2025-26	Championship	42	0	0	0	2	0	—		—		44	0
Preston North End	2026-27	Championship	1	0	0	0	1	0	—		0	0	2	0
Preston North End			43	0	0	0	3	0	—		0	0	46	0
Career total			94	1	3	0	8	1	2	0	5	0	112	2
