= 2024–25 KVC Westerlo season =

K.V.C. Westerlo
2024–25 season
- Manager: Timmy Simons
- Stadium: Het Kuipje
- Belgian Pro League: 10th
- Belgian Cup: Eighth round
- Top goalscorer: League: Matija Frigan; Allahyar Sayyadmanesh (6 each); All: Matija Frigan (7 goals)
Home colours	Away colours
- All statistics correct as of 15 December 2024.

The 2024–25 season is the 92nd season in the history of K.V.C. Westerlo, and the club's third consecutive season in Belgian Pro League. In addition to the domestic league, the team is participating in the Belgian Cup.

== Transfers ==
=== In ===
Pos.	Player	Transferred from	Fee	Date	Source
DF	(Croatia) Luka Vušković	(Croatia) Hajduk Split	Loan	9 July 2024	
FW	(United States) Julian Placias	(United States) North Carolina FC	Undisclosed	11 July 2024	
DF	(Turkey) Emir Ortakaya	(Turkey) Fenerbahçe	Loan	24 July 2024	
DF	(Turkey) Emin Bayram	(Turkey) Galatasaray	€4,000,000	30 July 2024	
FW	(England) Alfie Devine	(England) Tottenham Hotspur	Loan	5 September 2024	

=== Out ===
Pos.	Player	Transferred to	Fee	Date	Source
MF	(Poland) Karol Borys	(Slovenia) NK Maribor	Loan	1 July 2024	
FW	(Belgium) Kyan Vaesen	(Netherlands) Willem II	Loan	25 July 2024	

== Friendlies ==
=== Pre-season ===
28 June 2024 Friendly	Westerlo (Belgium)	5–0	(Belgium) Beveren
11:00

6 July 2024 Friendly	Young Boys (Switzerland)	0–1	(Belgium) Westerlo
15:00

9 July 2024 Friendly	Servette (Switzerland)	3–2	(Belgium) Westerlo
14:00

13 July 2024 Friendly	Westerlo (Belgium)	1–0	(Belgium) Gent
10:30	Bos 33'
Note: Behind closed doors

20 July 2024 Friendly	Westerlo (Belgium)	0–0	(Netherlands) Helmond Sport
18:00

== Competitions ==
=== Overall record ===
Competition	First match	Last match	Starting round	Record							
Competition	First match	Last match	Starting round	Pld	W	D	L	GF	GA	GD	Win %
Belgian Pro League regular season	28 July 2024	14–16 March 2025	Matchday 1	12	4	3	5	21	22	−1	33.33
Belgian Cup	29 October 2024		Seventh round	1	1	0	0	2	1	+1	100.00
Total				13	5	3	5	23	23	+0	38.46

Last updated: 29 October 2024
Source: Soccerway

=== Belgian Pro League ===
==== League table ====
Pos	Team	Pld	W	D	L	GF	GA	GD	Pts	Qualification or relegation
7	Standard Liège	30	10	9	11	22	35	−13	39	Qualification for the Europe play-offs
8	Mechelen	30	10	8	12	45	40	+5	38	Qualification for the Europe play-offs
9	Westerlo	30	10	7	13	50	49	+1	37	Qualification for the Europe play-offs
10	Charleroi	30	10	7	13	36	36	0	37	Qualification for the Europe play-offs
11	OH Leuven	30	8	13	9	28	33	−5	37	Qualification for the Europe play-offs

Source: Jupiler Pro League (in Dutch), Soccerway
Rules for classification: 1) Points; 2) Matches won; 3) Goal difference; 4) Goals scored; 5) Away matches won; 6) Away goal difference; 7) Away goals scored; 8) Play-off.

==== Results summary ====
Overall								Home						Away					
Pld	W	D	L	GF	GA	GD	Pts	W	D	L	GF	GA	GD	W	D	L	GF	GA	GD
7	3	2	2	15	13	+2	11	2	1	0	8	4	+4	1	1	2	7	9	−2

Last updated: 14 September 2024.

==== Matches ====
The match schedule was released on 11 June 2024.

28 July 2024 1	Westerlo	3–0	Cercle Brugge	Westerlo
19:15	Stassin 18', 55'; Sayyadmanesh 64'			Stadium: Het Kuipje; Attendance: 4,134; Referee: Kevin van Damme

3 August 2024 2	Mechelen	2–4	Westerlo	Mechelen
16:00	Storm 65'; Pflücke 88' (pen.)		Madsen 18' (pen.); Vušković 36'; Alcócer 79'; Frigan 90+5'	Stadium: AFAS Stadion; Referee: Bram van Driessche

10 August 2024 3	Westerlo	4–3	Union Saint-Gilloise	Westerlo
18:15				Stadium: Het Kuipje; Referee: Jasper Vergoot

9 February 2025 25	Westerlo	4–2	Standard Liège

16 February 2025 26	Cercle Brugge	1–1	Westerlo

22 February 2025 27	Westerlo	1–3	Charleroi

2 March 2025 28	OH Leuven	0–0	Westerlo

9 March 2025 29	Westerlo	2–0	Anderlecht

16 March 2025 30	Beerchot	1–2	Westerlo

==== Europe play-offs ====
Pos	Team	Pld	W	D	L	GF	GA	GD	Pts	Qualification or relegation	CHA	WES	MEC	DEN	STA	OHL
1	Charleroi (O)	10	6	3	1	19	10	+9	40	Qualification for the European competition play-off		4–3	3–0	4–1	1–0	2–1
2	Westerlo	10	3	5	2	19	16	+3	33		2–2		2–2	4–2	0–0	2–2
3	Mechelen	10	2	6	2	17	17	0	31		1–1	2–3		5–2	0–0	1–1
4	Dender EH	10	3	4	3	20	21	−1	29		2–1	1–0	2–2		1–1	5–0

Source: Jupiler Pro League (in Dutch), Soccerway
Legend: Blue = home team win; Yellow = draw; Red = away team win.
Rules for classification: 1) Points; 2) Points without (possible) half points added due to rounding; 3) Regular season finishing position.
(O) Play-off winners

===== Results by round =====
Round	1	2	3	4	5	6	7	8	9	10
Ground	A	H	H	A	A	H	H	A	A	H
Result	L	D	D	D	W	D	W	L	W	D
Position										

A = Away; H = Home; W = Win; D = Draw; L = Loss

30 March 2025 1	Dender	1–0	Westerlo

5 April 2025 2	Westerlo	2–2	OH Leuven

11 April 2025 3	Westerlo	2–2	Charleroi

19 April 2025 4	Standard Liège	1–1	Westerlo

22 April 2025 5	Mechelen	2–3	Westerlo

26 April 2025 6	Westerlo	2–2	Mechelen

2 May 2025 7	Westerlo	4–2	Dender

9 May 2025 8	Charleroi	4–3	Westerlo

16 May 2025 9	OH Leuven	0–2	Westerlo

24 May 2025 10	Westerlo	0–0	Standard Liège

=== Belgian Cup ===
29 October 2024 Seventh round	Westerlo	2–1	RWD Molenbeek	Westerlo
20:00 CET	Frigan 45'; Reynolds 56'	Report	Halifa 56'	Stadium: Het Kuipje

5 December 2024 Eighth round	Anderlecht	4–1	Westerlo	Anderlecht
20:30 CET	Jørgensen 11'; Dolberg 32', 56'; N'Diaye 43'	Report	Van den Keybus 8'	Stadium: Lotto Park
