= Ben Whiteman (footballer) =

English footballer

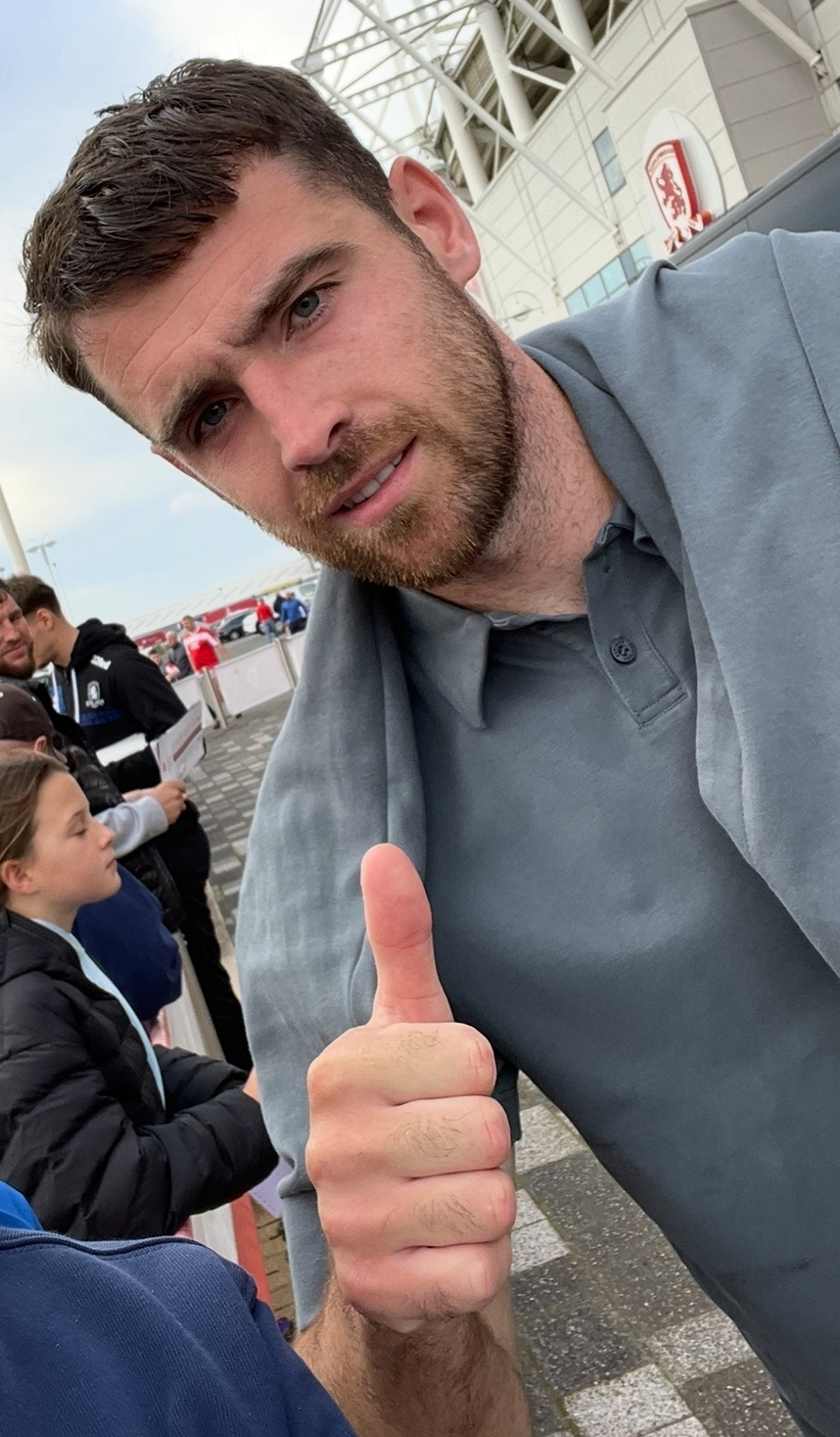
- Whiteman in 2024

Personal information
- Full name: Benjamin Whiteman
- Date of birth: 17 June 1996 (age 30)
- Place of birth: Heywood, England
- Height: 6 ft 1 in (1.85 m)
- Position: Defensive midfielder

Team information
- Current team: Wrexham
- Number: 8

Youth career
- Manchester United
- –2014: Sheffield United

Senior career*
Years	Team	Apps	(Gls)
2014–2018	Sheffield United	8	(0)
2016–2017	→ Mansfield Town (loan)	23	(7)
2017–2018	→ Doncaster Rovers (loan)	25	(6)
2018–2021	Doncaster Rovers	108	(13)
2021–2026	Preston North End	211	(13)
2026–	Wrexham	11	(1)
- * Club domestic league appearances and goals as of 18:03, 17 October 2026 (UTC)

Benjamin Whiteman (born 17 June 1996) is an English professional footballer who plays as a defensive midfielder for EFL Championship club Wrexham.

== Club career ==
=== Sheffield United ===
Whiteman came through the youth ranks at Manchester United until he was released at sixteen before being offered a scholarship. He joined Sheffield United and was assigned to the U18s side and then later the U21s side. At the end of the 2013–14 season, Whiteman signed his first professional contract with the club.

Whiteman was called up to the first team on 18 November 2014 by Nigel Clough against Crewe in the FA Cup, coming on as an 88th minute substitute for Stefan Scougall in a 2–0 win. However, this turned out to be his only first team appearance, with the player returning to the Under-21's. At the end of the season, he opted to take up the offer of a contract extension that would ensure he remained under contract for the 2015–16 season.

After impressing again in the development squad and with Nigel Adkins' pledge to play more youth players in the starting XI, Whiteman was called up to the first team on 1 March 2016 in the Blades' home league game against Burton Albion and was named on the bench, however he couldn't prevent his team losing 1–0, coming on as a 58th-minute substitute for Paul Coutts wearing the number 36 jersey. Whiteman kept his spot in the matchday squad but was an unused substitute in a 2–2 draw away against Fleetwood. He started against Oldham on 12 March 2016, where he set up the first two goals in a 3–0 victory. After being included in a number of first team matches towards the end of the season, Whiteman signed a contract extension with the club. By the end of the 2015–16 season, he had made six appearances.

In the 2016–17 season, he was determined to make a first team breakthrough under manager Chris Wilder. He was eventually promoted to the first team ahead of the new season. However, Whiteman struggled and spent the first half of the season on the bench.

=== Loan to Mansfield Town ===
On 1 January 2017, Whiteman was loaned out to Mansfield Town for the rest of the season.

He made his Mansfield Town debut, where he started, in a 1–0 win over Blackpool on 2 January 2017. In a follow-up match, he scored his first goal for the club, in a 3–0 win over Crewe Alexandra. Whiteman then scored four more goals, including a brace against Hartlepool United on 11 February 2017. As a result, he was nominated for January's Sky Bet League Two Player of the Month, but lost out to Ollie Watkins.

He remained in the first team for the rest of the season going on to score two more goals later in the season. At the end of the 2016–17 season, having made 23 appearances and scoring 7 times for the side, he left the club on a high note, winning the club's awards, including Meden Event Security's Manager's Player of the Season.

=== Doncaster Rovers ===
Whiteman joined Doncaster Rovers on loan in June 2017 being given a 12 shirt ahead of the new season.

Whiteman made his Doncaster Rovers debut starting in the opening game of the season in a 0–0 draw against Gillingham. He scored his first goal for Doncaster in a 3–2 EFL Cup win at Bradford City on 8 August 2017. Since making his debut for the club, he quickly became a first team regular. On 7 October 2017, Whiteman, whilst playing for Doncaster Rovers against Southend, scored his first ever senior hat-trick, with all three goals coming within 10 second-half minutes. Whiteman's goal against Southend United earned him the Goal of The Season by attendees at the club's end of season awards ceremony. He later scored three more goals. The Sportsman named Whiteman in League One's Team Of The Half-Season. He was recalled by Sheffield United in January 2018. Soon after he was signed permanently by Rovers for an undisclosed fee, on a three-and-a-half-year deal. For the rest of the season, Whiteman held his first team place as he went on to make 47 appearances, scoring 7 times in all competitions.

Shortly after he was named as team captain for the season, Doncaster Rovers reportedly turned down a substantial offer from Championship side Hull City just before the transfer window deadline on 8 August 2019. The tabled bid was reported to be worth at least £1,000,000.

He signed a new contract with Doncaster in November 2019, until 2023.

=== Preston North End ===
On 14 January 2021, Whiteman signed for Championship club Preston North End for £1.6 million, on a three-and-a-half-year deal. He scored his first goal for the club on 20 April 2021 in a 3–0 win against Derby County.

=== Wrexham ===
On 5 August 2026, Whiteman signed for Championship club Wrexham on a three-year deal for an undisclosed fee.

On 17 October 2026, he scored his first goal for the club in a 4–1 win against lowly Preston North End, his former club, at the Racecourse Ground.

== Career statistics ==
As of match played 17 October 2026

Appearances and goals by club, season and competition
Club	Season	League			FA Cup		League Cup		Other		Total	
Club	Season	Division	Apps	Goals	Apps	Goals	Apps	Goals	Apps	Goals	Apps	Goals
Sheffield United	2014–15	League One	0	0	1	0	0	0	0	0	1	0
Sheffield United	2015–16	League One	6	0	0	0	0	0	0	0	6	0
Sheffield United	2016–17	League One	2	0	1	0	0	0	2 (Note: Appearances in EFL Trophy)	0	5	0
Sheffield United	2017–18	Championship	0	0	0	0	—		—		0	0
Sheffield United	Total		8	0	2	0	0	0	2	0	12	0
Mansfield Town (loan)	2016–17	League Two	23	7	—		—		—		23	7
Doncaster Rovers	2017–18 (Note: Part of this season was spent on loan from Sheffield United)	League One	42	6	1	0	3	1	1	0	47	7
Doncaster Rovers	2018–19	League One	40	3	6	2	2	0	2 (Note: Appearances in League One play-offs)	0	50	5
Doncaster Rovers	2019–20	League One	33	5	2	0	1	0	3	0	39	5
Doncaster Rovers	2020–21	League One	18	5	2	3	0	0	3	0	23	8
Doncaster Rovers	Total		133	19	11	5	6	1	9	0	159	25
Preston North End	2020–21	Championship	23	1	—		—		—		23	1
Preston North End	2021–22	Championship	44	4	1	0	3	0	—		48	4
Preston North End	2022–23	Championship	36	3	1	0	2	0	—		39	3
Preston North End	2023–24	Championship	30	3	1	0	0	0	—		31	3
Preston North End	2024–25	Championship	35	0	2	0	2	0	—		39	0
Preston North End	2025–26	Championship	43	2	0	0	2	0	—		45	2
Preston North End	Total		211	13	5	0	9	0	—		225	13
Wrexham	2026–27	Championship	11	1	0	0	1	0	0	0	12	1
Career total			386	40	18	5	16	1	11	0	432	46

== Personal life ==
Whiteman grew up supporting Manchester United, whom he played for at Academy level.

== Honours ==
Individual

- Doncaster Rovers Player of the Year: 2018–19
