= Finlay Cross-Adair =

English footballer (born 2005)

Personal information
- Full name: Finlay Douglas Cross-Adair
- Date of birth: 11 January 2005 (age 21)
- Position: Forward

Team information
- Current team: Longridge Town

Senior career*
Years	Team	Apps	(Gls)
2022–2024	Preston North End	4	(0)
2023	→ Annan Athletic (loan)	5	(1)
2024	→ Prescot Cables (loan)	6	(0)
2024–2025	Fleetwood Town	1	(0)
2024–2025	→ Warrington Town (loan)	5	(1)
2025	Prescot Cables		
2025–2026	Ramsbottom United		
2026–	Longridge Town		
- * Club domestic league appearances and goals as of 17:05, 25 April 2025 (UTC)

Finlay Douglas Cross-Adair (born 11 January 2005) is an English footballer who plays as a forward for Longridge Town

== Career ==
=== Preston North End ===
Cross-Adair joined the Preston North End academy aged ten, making his debut for the club on 15 October 2022 as a substitute in a 2–0 defeat to Stoke City. In December 2022, he signed a two-and-a-half year deal with the club, his first professional contract.

On 3 August 2023, Cross-Adair joined Scottish League One club Annan Athletic on loan until 31 January 2024. In October 2023, he suffered serious injuries following a car accident on the A6 in Lancaster. He underwent two operations later in the month, being given the 'all clear' by his surgeon in January 2024.

In August 2024, he joined Northern Premier League Premier Division side Prescot Cables on loan until 1 December 2024.

=== Fleetwood Town ===
In November 2024, Cross-Adair was spotted on trial with League Two club Fleetwood Town. The following month, the move was confirmed after he joined National League North side Warrington Town on loan from Fleetwood. On 1 April 2025, he made his debut as a late substitute in a 4–1 victory over Accrington Stanley.

=== Non-League ===
In June 2025, Cross-Adair returned to Prescot Cables following his departure from Fleetwood Town. In December 2025, after campaign groups Her Game Too and White Ribbon UK sent an open letter to all sponsors and local supporter groups, Prescot Cables announced the departure of Cross-Adair. In December 2025, Cross-Adair signed for Ramsbottom Utd FC who play in the North West Counties League. After a short and unsuccessful spell at Ramsbottom, Cross-Adair signed for Longridge Town Football Club for the 2026 season but left by mutual consent after a handful of games.

== Career statistics ==
As of match played 1 April 2025

Appearances and goals by club, season and competition
Club	Season	League			National Cup (Note: Includes appearances in FA Cup)		League Cup		Other		Total	
Club	Season	Division	Apps	Goals	Apps	Goals	Apps	Goals	Apps	Goals	Apps	Goals
Preston North End	2022–23	Championship	4	0	2	0	0	0	—		6	0
Preston North End	2023–24	Championship	0	0	0	0	0	0	—		0	0
Preston North End	2024–25	Championship	0	0	0	0	0	0	—		0	0
Preston North End	Total		4	0	2	0	0	0	0	0	6	0
Annan Athletic (loan)	2023–24	Scottish League One	5	1	0	0	0	0	2 (Note: Appearance(s) in Scottish Challenge Cup)	0	7	1
Prescot Cables (loan)	2024–25	Northern Premier League Premier Division	6	0	1	0	—		0	0	7	0
Fleetwood Town	2024–25	League Two	1	0	0	0	0	0	0	0	1	0
Warrington Town (loan)	2024–25	National League North	5	1	0	0	—		0	0	5	1
Total			21	2	3	0	0	0	2	0	26	2

== Personal life ==
In January 2024, Cross-Adair was sentenced to an eighteen-month community order having pleaded guilty to assault in regards to an attack on a woman in May 2023.

In October 2023, Cross-Adair crashed his Seat car into an oncoming van on the A6 in Lancaster. Preston North End released a statement offering "full support" but he didn't play for them again.

In May 2026, Cross-Adair was arrested for drug offences in Preston. He appeared before Magistrates in the town in October 2026 and pleaded guilty to drug offences including being in charge of a vehicle with excess drugs having been found to be 5 times over the legal limit for cocaine.
