= 2022–23 Preston North End F.C. season =

English football club season

Preston North End
2022–23 season
- Manager: Ryan Lowe
- Stadium: Deepdale
- Championship: 12th
- FA Cup: Fourth round
- EFL Cup: Second round
- Top goalscorer: League: Ched Evans (9); All: Ched Evans (9)
Home colours	Away colours	Third colours

The 2022–23 season is the 143rd season in the existence of Preston North End Football Club and the club's eighth consecutive season in the Championship. In addition to the league, they will also compete in the 2022–23 FA Cup and the 2022–23 EFL Cup. The season covers the period from July 2022 to 30 June 2023.

== Squad ==
As of 29 July 2022

Note: Flags indicate national team as has been defined under FIFA eligibility rules. Players may hold more than one non-FIFA nationality.

No.	Name	Nat.	Position(s)	Date of birth (age)	Apps.	Goals	Year signed	Signed from	Transfer fee
Goalkeepers
1	Freddie Woodman	(England)	GK	4 March 1997 (age 29)	30	0	2022	(England) Newcastle United	Undisclosed
25	David Cornell	(Wales)	GK	28 March 1991 (age 35)	1	0	2022	(England) Peterborough United	Free
38	James Pradic	(England)	GK	July 2, 2005 (age 21)	0	0	2022	Academy	Trainee
Defenders
2	Álvaro Carreras	(Spain)	LB	23 March 2003 (age 23)	23	0	2022	(England) Manchester United	Loan
3	Greg Cunningham	(Republic of Ireland)	LB/CB	31 January 1991 (age 35)	163	7	2021	(Wales) Cardiff City	Undisclosed
5	Patrick Bauer	(Germany)	CB	28 October 1992 (age 33)	96	8	2019	(England) Charlton Athletic	Free
6	Liam Lindsay	(Scotland)	CB	12 October 1995 (age 30)	56	2	2021	(England) Stoke City	Undisclosed
14	Jordan Storey	(England)	CB	22 September 1997 (age 29)	125	4	2018	(England) Exeter City	Undisclosed
16	Andrew Hughes	(Wales)	CB/LB	5 June 1992 (age 34)	161	8	2018	(England) Peterborough United	Undisclosed
22	Matthew Olosunde	(United States)	RB/CB	7 March 1998 (age 28)	2	0	2021	(England) Rotherham United	Free
23	Bambo Diaby	(Senegal)	CB	17 December 1997 (age 28)	15	1	2022	Free agent	Free
Midfielders
4	Benjamin Whiteman	(England)	CM/AM/RM	17 June 1996 (age 30)	96	7	2021	(England) Doncaster Rovers	Undislosed
8	Alan Browne	(Republic of Ireland)	CM/DM/AM/RB	15 April 1995 (age 31)	360	41	2014	(Republic of Ireland) Cork City	£31,000
10	Daniel Johnson	(Jamaica)	AM/CM	8 October 1992 (age 34)	321	56	2015	(England) Aston Villa	£50,000
11	Robbie Brady	(Republic of Ireland)	LM/LB/RM	14 January 1992 (age 34)	25	0	2022	(England) Bournemouth	Free
13	Ali McCann	(Northern Ireland) (Scotland)	CM/AM/DM	4 December 1999 (age 26)	58	3	2021	(Scotland) St Johnstone	Undisclosed
17	Josh Onomah	(England)	CM/AM	27 April 1997 (age 29)	0	0	2023	(England) Fulham	Free
18	Ryan Ledson	(England)	CM/DM	19 August 1997 (age 29)	135	4	2018	(England) Oxford United	Undisclosed
20	Ben Woodburn	(Wales) (England)	AM/LW/RW	15 October 1999 (age 26)	28	2	2022	(England) Liverpool	Free transfer
30	Dana Amaral	(England)	CM	3 October 2003 (age 23)	0	0	2020	Academy	Trainee
39	Mikey O'Neill	(England)	AM/CF	8 June 2004 (age 22)	8	0	2021	Academy	Trainee
44	Brad Potts	(England)	CM/RM/AM	3 July 1994 (age 32)	156	13	2019	(England) Barnsley	Undisclosed
Forwards
7	Liam Delap	(England)	CF	8 February 2003 (age 23)	2	0	2023	(England) Manchester City	Loan
9	Ched Evans	(Wales)	CF	28 December 1988 (age 37)	66	12	2021	(England) Fleetwood Town	Undisclosed
15	Troy Parrott	(Republic of Ireland)	CF/SS/LW	4 February 2002 (age 24)	17	2	2022	(England) Tottenham Hotspur	Loan
19	Emil Riis Jakobsen	(Denmark)	CF	24 June 1998 (age 28)	113	28	2020	(Denmark) Randers	Undisclosed
28	Tom Cannon	(Republic of Ireland) (England)	CF	28 December 2002 (age 23)	3	0	2023	(England) Everton	Loan
Out on loan:
34	Lewis Coulton	(Scotland) (England)	LB	3 March 2003 (age 23)	0	0	2021	Academy	Trainee

- All appearances and goals up to date as of 28 January 2022.

== Statistics ==
As of 11 April 2022
Players with names in italics and marked * were on loan from another club for the whole of their season with Preston North End.

No.	Pos	Nat	Player	Total		Championship		FA Cup		EFL Cup	
No.	Pos	Nat	Player	Apps	Goals	Apps	Goals	Apps	Goals	Apps	Goals
1	GK	(England) ENG	Freddie Woodman	46	0	43+0	0	2+0	0	1+0	0
2	DF	(Spain) ESP	Álvaro Carreras	39	0	24+12	0	1+1	0	1+0	0
3	DF	(Republic of Ireland) IRL	Greg Cunningham	24	2	20+2	2	0+0	0	2+0	0
4	MF	(England) ENG	Ben Whiteman	37	3	34+1	3	1+0	0	1+0	0
5	DF	(Germany) GER	Patrick Bauer	5	0	1+2	0	0+0	0	2+0	0
6	DF	(Scotland) SCO	Liam Lindsay	38	0	35+1	0	2+0	0	0+0	0
7	FW	(England) ENG	Liam Delap*	12	1	5+7	1	0+0	0	0+0	0
8	MF	(Republic of Ireland) IRL	Alan Browne	38	2	30+5	1	2+0	1	0+1	0
9	FW	(Wales) WAL	Ched Evans	28	9	14+12	9	1+0	0	1+0	0
10	MF	(Jamaica) JAM	Daniel Johnson	36	1	24+8	1	1+1	0	1+1	0
11	MF	(Republic of Ireland) IRL	Robbie Brady	36	0	24+10	0	1+1	0	0+0	0
13	MF	(Northern Ireland) NIR	Ali McCann	32	2	20+8	0	2+0	0	2+0	2
14	DF	(England) ENG	Jordan Storey	44	2	40+1	2	1+0	0	2+0	0
15	FW	(Republic of Ireland) IRL	Troy Parrott	31	4	18+11	3	0+0	0	1+1	1
16	DF	(Wales) WAL	Andrew Hughes	30	2	24+4	2	2+0	0	0+0	0
17	MF	(England) ENG	Josh Onomah	10	0	2+8	0	0+0	0	0+0	0
18	MF	(England) ENG	Ryan Ledson	40	1	21+16	1	2+0	0	1+0	0
19	FW	(Denmark) DEN	Emil Riis Jakobsen	26	5	18+6	5	0+0	0	1+1	0
20	MF	(Wales) WAL	Ben Woodburn	39	2	11+24	1	1+1	0	2+0	1
22	DF	(United States) USA	Matthew Olosunde	1	0	0+0	0	0+0	0	1+0	0
23	DF	(Senegal) SEN	Bambo Diaby	18	1	9+8	0	1+0	1	0+0	0
25	GK	(Wales) WAL	David Cornell	1	0	0+0	0	0+0	0	1+0	0
28	FW	(Republic of Ireland) IRL	Tom Cannon*	18	8	16+1	8	1+0	0	0+0	0
29	FW	(England) ENG	Finlay Cross-Adair	6	0	0+4	0	0+2	0	0+0	0
31	DF	(England) ENG	Jacob Slater	3	0	0+1	0	0+0	0	0+2	0
32	MF	(England) ENG	Lewis Leigh	2	0	0+0	0	0+0	0	0+2	0
36	FW	(France) FRA	Noah Mawene	1	0	0+1	0	0+0	0	0+0	0
37	FW	(England) ENG	Kaedyn Kamara	1	0	0+1	0	0+0	0	0+0	0
39	MF	(England) ENG	Mikey O'Neill	5	0	0+3	0	1+0	0	0+1	0
44	MF	(England) ENG	Brad Potts	39	5	34+3	4	0+0	0	1+1	1
Players who left the club during the season:
24	FW	(Republic of Ireland) IRL	Sean Maguire	10	0	4+6	0	0+0	0	0+0	0

=== Goals record ===
As of 11 April 2023

Rank	No.	Nat.	Po.	Name	Championship	FA Cup	EFL Cup	Total
1	9	(Wales)	CF	Ched Evans	9	0	0	9
2	28	(Republic of Ireland)	CF	Tom Cannon	8	0	0	8
3	19	(Denmark)	CF	Emil Riis Jakobsen	5	0	0	5
3	44	(England)	CM	Brad Potts	4	0	1	5
6	15	(Republic of Ireland)	CF	Troy Parrott	3	0	1	4
7	4	(England)	CM	Ben Whiteman	3	0	0	3
7	3	(Republic of Ireland)	LB	Greg Cunningham	2	0	0	2
7	8	(Republic of Ireland)	CM	Alan Browne	1	1	0	2
7	13	(Northern Ireland)	CM	Ali McCann	0	0	2	2
7	14	(England)	CB	Jordan Storey	2	0	0	2
7	16	(Wales)	LB	Andrew Hughes	2	0	0	2
7	20	(Wales)	AM	Ben Woodburn	1	0	1	2
7	Own Goals				1	1	0	2
14	10	(Jamaica)	AM	Daniel Johnson	1	0	0	1
14	18	(England)	CM	Ryan Ledson	1	0	0	1
14	23	(Senegal)	CB	Bambo Diaby	0	1	0	1
Total					43	3	5	51

=== Disciplinary record ===
As of 20 April 2023

Rank	No.	Nat.	Po.	Name	Championship			FA Cup			EFL Cup			Total		
Rank	No.	Nat.	Po.	Name	Booked	(yellow card) (yellow-red card)	Sent off (straight red)	Booked	(yellow card) (yellow-red card)	Sent off (straight red)	Booked	(yellow card) (yellow-red card)	Sent off (straight red)	Booked	(yellow card) (yellow-red card)	Sent off (straight red)
1	6	(Scotland)	CB	Liam Lindsay	12	0	0	0	0	0	0	0	0	12	0	0
2	14	(England)	CB	Jordan Storey	9	0	0	0	0	0	0	0	0	9	0	0
3	11	(Republic of Ireland)	LM	Robbie Brady	6	1	0	0	0	0	0	0	0	6	1	0
4	9	(Wales)	CF	Ched Evans	6	0	1	0	0	0	0	0	0	6	0	1
4	44	(England)	LM	Brad Potts	7	0	0	0	0	0	0	0	0	7	0	0
6	2	(Spain)	RB	Álvaro Carreras	6	0	0	0	0	0	0	0	0	6	0	0
6	4	(England)	CM	Ben Whiteman	5	0	1	0	0	0	0	0	0	5	0	1
8	8	(Republic of Ireland)	CM	Alan Browne	5	0	0	0	0	0	0	0	0	5	0	0
8	10	(Jamaica)	AM	Daniel Johnson	5	0	0	0	0	0	0	0	0	5	0	0
8	13	(Northern Ireland)	CM	Ali McCann	5	0	0	0	0	0	0	0	0	5	0	0
8	16	(Wales)	LB	Andrew Hughes	5	0	0	0	0	0	0	0	0	5	0	0
8	18	(England)	CM	Ryan Ledson	5	0	0	0	0	0	0	0	0	5	0	0
8	28	(Republic of Ireland)	CF	Tom Cannon	4	0	0	1	0	0	0	0	0	5	0	0
14	1	(England)	GK	Freddie Woodman	3	0	0	0	0	0	0	0	0	3	0	0
14	3	(Republic of Ireland)	LB	Greg Cunningham	4	0	0	0	0	0	0	0	0	4	0	0
14	20	(Wales)	AM	Ben Woodburn	3	0	0	0	0	0	1	0	0	4	0	0
14	23	(Senegal)	CB	Bambo Diaby	2	1	0	0	0	0	0	0	0	2	1	0
18	7	(England)	CF	Liam Delap	2	0	0	0	0	0	0	0	0	2	0	0
19	15	(Republic of Ireland)	CF	Troy Parrott	1	0	0	0	0	0	0	0	0	1	0	0
19	17	(England)	CM	Josh Onomah	1	0	0	0	0	0	0	0	0	1	0	0
Total					!98	2	2	1	0	0	1	0	0	100	2	2

== Transfers ==
=== In ===
Date	Pos	Player	From	Fee	Ref
21 June 2022	GK	(England) Freddie Woodman	(England) Newcastle United	Undisclosed	
1 July 2022 (Note: The transfer was announced on 27 June, but he will officially join when his Peterborough United contract ends on 1 July)	GK	(Wales) David Cornell	(England) Peterborough United	Free transfer	
1 July 2022	MF	(England) Kaedyn Kamara	(England) Burnley	Undisclosed	
4 July 2022	LM	(Republic of Ireland) Robbie Brady	(England) AFC Bournemouth	Free transfer	
4 July 2022	LW	(Wales) Ben Woodburn	(England) Liverpool	Free transfer	
31 January 2023	CM	(England) Josh Onomah	(England) Fulham	Free Transfer	

=== Out ===
Date	Pos	Player	To	Fee	Ref
27 June 2022	CM	(England) Tom Bayliss	(England) Shrewsbury Town	Released	
27 June 2022	LB	(England) Josh Earl	(England) Fleetwood Town	Released	
30 June 2022	RW	(England) Tom Barkhuizen	(England) Derby County	Released	
30 June 2022	CM	(England) Jack Baxter	(England) Stafford Rangers	Released	
30 June 2022	CB	(England) Joe Blanchard	Free agency	Released	
30 June 2022	SS	(England) Izzy Brown	Free agency	Released	
30 June 2022	GK	(England) Declyn Duggan	Free agency	Released	
30 June 2022	FW	(England) Vaughn Green	Free agency	Released	
30 June 2022	CF	(England) Jacob Holland-Wilkinson	(England) Stoke City	Released	
30 June 2022	GK	(England) Mathew Hudson	(England) Buxton	Released	
30 June 2022	CB	(England) Paul Huntington	(England) Carlisle United	Released	
30 June 2022	CM	(England) Levi Lewis	Free agency	Released	
30 June 2022	GK	(England) Oliver Lombard	Free agency	Released	
30 June 2022	CB	(England) Teddy Mfuni	(England) Warrington Town	Released	
30 June 2022	RB	(Republic of Ireland) Joe Rafferty	(England) Portsmouth	Released	
30 June 2022	GK	(England) Connor Ripley	(England) Morecambe	Released	
30 June 2022	CF	(England) Joe Rodwell-Grant	(England) Wigan Athletic	Released	
30 June 2022	LW	(England) Scott Sinclair	(England) Bristol Rovers	Released	
30 June 2022	CF	(Wales) Jamie Thomas	(England) Bamber Bridge	Released	
30 June 2022	LW	(England) Ethan Walker	(England) Blackburn Rovers	Released	
1 September 2022	AM	(England) Josh Harrop	(England) Northampton Town	Mutual Agreement	
26 January 2023	CF	(Republic of Ireland) Sean Maguire	(England) Coventry City	Free Transfer	
30 January 2023	CM	(Republic of Ireland) Adam O'Reilly	(Northern Ireland) Derry City	Undisclosed	

=== Loans in ===
Date	Pos	Player	From	Until	Ref
25 July 2022	CF	(Republic of Ireland) Troy Parrott	(England) Tottenham Hotspur	End of Season	
26 July 2022	LB	(Spain) Álvaro Carreras	(England) Manchester United	End of Season	
10 January 2023	CF	(Republic of Ireland) Thomas Cannon	(England) Everton	End of Season	
12 January 2023	CF	(England) Liam Delap	(England) Manchester City	End of Season	

=== Loans out ===
Date	Pos	Player	To	Until	Ref
27 July 2022	LB	(Scotland) Lewis Coulton	(England) Chester	17 November 2022 (Note: On 17 November, Coulton returned to Preston.)	
1 August 2022	FW	(Wales) Aaron Bennett	(England) Altrincham	31 October 2022	
12 August 2022	RB	(Republic of Ireland) Josh Seary	(England) Warrington Town	2 January 2023 (Note: On 14 November, Seary's loan at Warrington was extended until the new year.)	
7 September 2022	CB	(Republic of Ireland) Harry Nevin	(England) Stafford Rangers	8 October 2022	
11 October 2022	CB	(Republic of Ireland) Harry Nevin	(England) Nantwich Town	1 January 2023	
18 November 2022	CM	(England) Dana De Oliveira Amaral	(England) Ashton United	15 January 2023	
14 January 2023	CF	(England) Mikey O'Neill	(England) Grimsby Town	End of Season	
14 February 2023	LB	(Scotland) Lewis Coulton	(England) Bradford (Park Avenue)	End of Season	
16 February 2023	AM	(Wales) Aaron Bennett	(England) Altrincham	End of Season	
10 March 2023	CF	(England) Finlay Cross-Adair	(England) Bamber Bridge	End of Season	
23 March 2023	CM	(England) Dana De Oliveira Amaral	(England) Warrington Rylands	End of Season	
14 April 2023	GK	(Wales) James Pradic	(England) Bamber Bridge	End of Season	

== Pre-season and friendlies ==
On 26 May, PNE announced their first pre-season friendlies, against Bamber Bridge and Accrington Stanley. A pre-season training camp in Alicante was also confirmed by the club. A home fixture against Scottish side Heart of Midlothian was later added to the schedule. A fourth friendly, against Leicester City was confirmed. As part of the training camp in Spain, a friendly with Getafe was announced.

Win Draw Loss Fixtures

2 July 2022 Friendly	Bamber Bridge	0–3	Preston North End	Bamber Bridge
15:00 BST		Report	Whiteman 50'; Woodburn 54'; O’Neill 68'	Stadium: The Sir Tom Finney Stadium; Attendance: 2,152

5 July 2022 Friendly	Preston North End	0–1	Tranmere Rovers	Euxton
14:00 BST		Report	Nolan 80'	Stadium: Preston North End Training Ground; Attendance: 0 (behind-closed-doors)

12 July 2022 Friendly	Getafe	2–1	Preston North End	Alicante, Spain
10:45 CEST	Álvarez 50', 84'	Report	Ledson 2'	Stadium: Real Club de Golf Campoamor Resort

16 July 2022 Friendly	Accrington Stanley	0–1	Preston North End	Accrington
15:00 BST		Report	Riis Jakobsen 38'	Stadium: Wham Stadium; Attendance: 1,897; Referee: David Webb

20 July 2022 Friendly	Preston North End	2–1	Heart of Midlothian	Preston
19:45 BST	Woodburn 34'; Browne 76'	Report	Haring 65' (pen.)	Stadium: Deepdale; Referee: Peter Bankes

23 July 2022 Friendly	Preston North End	1–2	Leicester City	Preston
15:00 BST	McCann 49'	Report	Vardy 12'; Barnes 18'	Stadium: Deepdale; Attendance: 4,553; Referee: Jarred Gillett

== Competitions ==
=== Overall record ===
Competition	First match	Last match	Starting round	Final position	Record							
Competition	First match	Last match	Starting round	Final position	Pld	W	D	L	GF	GA	GD	Win %
Championship	30 July 2022	6 May 2023	Matchday 1		11	2	7	2	3	4	−1	18.18
FA Cup	TBC	TBC	Third round		0	0	0	0	0	0	+0	—
EFL Cup	9 August 2022	23 August 2022	First round	Second round	2	1	0	1	5	3	+2	50.00
Total					13	3	7	3	8	7	+1	23.08

Last updated: 1 October 2022
Source: [ Soccerway]

=== Championship ===
==== League table ====
Pos	Team	Pld	W	D	L	GF	GA	GD	Pts
9	West Bromwich Albion	46	18	12	16	59	53	+6	66
10	Swansea City	46	18	12	16	68	64	+4	66
11	Watford	46	16	15	15	56	53	+3	63
12	Preston North End	46	17	12	17	45	59	−14	63
13	Norwich City	46	17	11	18	57	54	+3	62
14	Bristol City	46	15	14	17	55	56	−1	59
15	Hull City	46	14	16	16	51	61	−10	58

Source: EFL Official Website
Rules for classification: 1) Points; 2) Goal difference; 3) Number of goals scored; 4) Head-to-head results; 5) Wins; 6) Away goals; 7) Penalty points (sec 9.5); 8) 12-point sending off offences

==== Results summary ====
Overall								Home						Away					
Pld	W	D	L	GF	GA	GD	Pts	W	D	L	GF	GA	GD	W	D	L	GF	GA	GD
45	17	12	16	45	56	−11	63	7	7	8	20	25	−5	10	5	8	25	31	−6

Last updated: 29 April 2023.
Source: [ Soccerway]

==== Matches ====
Win Draw Loss Fixtures

On 23 June, the league fixtures were announced.

30 July 2022 1	Wigan Athletic	0–0	Preston North End	Wigan
15:00 BST	Power (yellow card) 28'; Darikwa (yellow card) 59'	Report	Browne (yellow card) 42'; Hughes (yellow card) 46'; Woodburn (yellow card) 76'; Evans (red card) 80'	Stadium: DW Stadium; Attendance: 15,429; Referee: Bobby Madley

6 August 2022 2	Preston North End	0–0	Hull City	Preston
15:00 BST	Browne (yellow card) 90+6'	Report	Slater (yellow card) 23'; Sayyadmanesh (yellow card) 43'; Jones (yellow card) 74'; Seri (yellow card) 84'	Stadium: Deepdale; Attendance: 15,816; Referee: Jeremy Simpson

13 August 2022 3	Luton Town	0–1	Preston North End	Luton
15:00 BST		Report	Potts 18'; Whiteman (yellow card) 39'; Woodman (yellow card) 77'; Hughes (yellow card) 80'; Storey (yellow card) 85'; Johnson (yellow card) 86'; Ledson (yellow card) 90+5'	Stadium: Kenilworth Road; Attendance: 9,740; Referee: Dean Whitestone

16 August 2022 4	Preston North End	0–0	Rotherham United	Preston
19:45 BST	Storey (yellow card) 90+6'	Report	Bramall (yellow card) 38'; Harding (yellow card) 63'; Johansson (yellow card) 74'	Stadium: Deepdale; Attendance: 14,479; Referee: Oliver Langford

20 August 2022 5	Preston North End	0–0	Watford	Preston
15:00 BST	Brady (yellow card) 79'; Cunningham (yellow card) 90+3'	Report	Manaj (yellow card) 37'; Cathcart (yellow card) 83'	Stadium: Deepdale; Attendance: 15,317; Referee: Darren Bond

27 August 2022 6	Cardiff City	0–0	Preston North End	Cardiff
15:00 BST		Report	Whiteman (yellow card) 54'; Potts (yellow card) 81'	Stadium: Cardiff City Stadium; Attendance: 17,922; Referee: James Linington

31 August 2022 7	Coventry City	0–1	Preston North End	Coventry
19:45 BST	Wilson (yellow card) 36'	Report	Storey (yellow card) 28'; Riis Jakobsen 73'; McCann (yellow card) 90+5'	Stadium: The Coventry Building Society Arena; Attendance: 18,913; Referee: John Busby

3 September 2022 8	Preston North End	0–1	Birmingham City	Preston
15:00 BST	Evans (yellow card) 83'	Report	Colin 16'; Roberts (yellow card) 65'; Hogan (yellow card) 69'; James (yellow card) 90+5'	Stadium: Deepdale; Attendance: 16,098; Referee: James Bell

10 September 2022	Bristol City	P–P	Preston North End	Ashton Gate
15:00 BST				Stadium: Ashton Gate
Note: Fixture was postponed as a mark of respect following the passing of Queen Elizabeth II.

13 September 2022 9	Preston North End	1–1	Burnley	Preston
19:45 BST	McCann (yellow card) 4'; Storey 15'; Parrott (yellow card) 33'	Report	Harwood-Bellis 10'	Stadium: Deepdale; Attendance: 20,212; Referee: Peter Bankes

17 September 2022 10	Preston North End	0–2	Sheffield United	Preston
15:00 BST	Lindsay (yellow card) 15'	Report	Ndiaye 40'; Egan (yellow card) 73'; McBurnie 75', (yellow card) 76'; Norwood (yellow card) 90+3'	Stadium: Deepdale; Attendance: 18,412; Referee: Jeremy Simpson

1 October 2022 11	Sunderland	0–0	Preston North End	Sunderland
15:00 BST	Roberts (yellow card) 60'	Report	Lindsay (yellow card) 55'	Stadium: Stadium of Light; Attendance: 41,825; Referee: Andy Woolmer

5 October 2022 12	Preston North End	1–0	West Bromwich Albion	Preston
20:00 BST	Riis Jakobsen 7'; Whiteman (yellow card) 52'; Storey (yellow card) 90+4'	Report	Diangana (yellow card) 84'	Stadium: Deepdale; Attendance: 13,924; Referee: Josh Smith

8 October 2022 13	Norwich City	2–3	Preston North End	Norwich
15:00 BST	Sargent 2'; Byram (yellow card) 30'; Sara 76'	Report	Riis Jakobsen 25' 51'; Brady (yellow card) 44'; Álvaro Carreras (yellow card) 55'; Browne (yellow card) 59'; Storey (yellow card) 64'; Parrott 80'; Johnson (yellow card) 90+7'	Stadium: Carrow Road; Attendance: 26,062; Referee: Oliver Langford

12 October 2022 14	Bristol City	2–1	Preston North End	Ashton Gate
19:45 BST	Dasilva (yellow card) 34'; Atkinson 54' 90'; Vyner (yellow card) 67'; Weimann (yellow card) 81'	Report	Lindsay (yellow card) 29'; Woodburn (yellow card) 78'; Hughes 82'; Cunningham (yellow card) 84'; Brady (yellow card) 90+6'	Stadium: Ashton Gate; Attendance: 17,367; Referee: Keith Stroud

15 October 2022 15	Preston North End	0–2	Stoke City	Preston
15:00 BST	Hughes (yellow card) 14'	Report	Smallbone 58'; Campbell 66'	Stadium: Deepdale; Attendance: 17,498; Referee: Matt Donohue

18 October 2022 16	Huddersfield Town	0–1	Preston North End	Huddersfield
19:45 BST	Kasumu (yellow card) 8'; Rhodes (yellow card) 41'; Holmes (yellow card) 75'; Camara (yellow card) 77'; Jackson (yellow card) 90+2'	Report	Cunningham 50'; Ledson (yellow card) 76'	Stadium: The John Smith's Stadium; Attendance: 18,357; Referee: Andy Woolmer

22 October 2022 17	Blackpool	4–2	Preston North End	Blackpool
12:30 BST	Yates 30' 81'; Patino (yellow card) 45+1' (goal) 68'; Hamilton 90+5'	Report	Álvaro Carreras (yellow card) 27'; Whiteman 38' (pen.); Storey (yellow card) 45'; Connolly 89' (o.g.)	Stadium: Bloomfield Road; Attendance: 13,632; Referee: Chris Kavanagh

29 October 2022 18	Preston North End	2–1	Middlesbrough	Preston
15:00 BST	Whiteman (yellow card) 29'; Riis Jakobsen 35'; Lindsay (yellow card) 49'; Álvaro Carreras (yellow card) 75'; Storey 90+1'	Report	Akpom 8' (yellow card) 90'; Hackney (yellow card) 24'; Howson (yellow card) 34'	Stadium: Deepdale; Attendance: 16,984; Referee: Gavin Ward

1 November 2022 19	Preston North End	1–0	Swansea City	Preston
19:45 GMT	Potts 30'; Ledson (yellow card) 55'; Storey (yellow card) 66'; Browne (yellow card) 73'; McCann (yellow card) 90'	Report	Cabango (yellow card) 11'; Grimes (yellow card) 70'; Oko-Flex (yellow card) 90+5'	Stadium: Deepdale; Attendance: 13,631; Referee: John Busby

4 November 2022 20	Reading	1–2	Preston North End	Reading
20:00 GMT	Loum (yellow card) 56'; João 71' (pen.)	Report	Brady (yellow card) 23'; Evans 51', 79' (yellow card) 81'; Ledson (yellow card) 77'; Potts (yellow card) 90+5'	Stadium: Select Car Leasing Stadium; Attendance: 11,777; Referee: David Webb

12 November 2022 21	Preston North End	2–4	Millwall	Preston
15:00 GMT	Lindsay (yellow card) 14'; Hughes 20'; Evans 28'	Report	Flemming 4', 16', 64'; Saville (yellow card) 19'; Long (yellow card) 20'; McNamara (yellow card) 31'; Cresswell 72'	Stadium: Deepdale; Attendance: 15,184; Referee: Oliver Langford

10 December 2022 22	Blackburn Rovers	1–4	Preston North End	Blackburn
12:00 GMT	Carter (yellow card) 35'; Dack 55'	Report	Woodburn 16'; Evans (yellow card) 44', (goal) 47', 63'; Whiteman 65'; Johnson (yellow card) 90+3'	Stadium: Ewood Park; Attendance: 17,690; Referee: Josh Smith

17 December 2022 23	Preston North End	0–1	Queens Park Rangers	Preston
15:00 GMT	Lindsay (yellow card) 74'	Report	Dozzell (yellow card) 3'; Dykes (yellow card) 27'; Dunne 58'; Dieng (yellow card) 77'	Stadium: Deepdale; Attendance: 14,534; Referee: Oliver Langford

26 December 2022 24	Preston North End	1–2	Huddersfield Town	Preston
15:00 GMT	Cunningham 34', (yellow card) 56'; Evans (yellow card) 90+5'	Report	Kasumu (yellow card) 14'; Hogg (yellow card) 26'; Rhodes 76'; Kesler-Hayden 85'; Holmes (yellow card) 90+5'	Stadium: Deepdale; Attendance: 16,982; Referee: Geoff Eltringham

29 December 2022 25	West Bromwich Albion	2–0	Preston North End	West Bromwich
20:00 GMT	Yokuşlu 36', 57'; Diangana (yellow card) 45+1'	Report	Lindsay (yellow card) 10'	Stadium: The Hawthorns; Attendance: 25,321; Referee: Andy Woolmer

2 January 2023 26	Stoke City	0–1	Preston North End	Stoke-on-Trent
15:00 GMT Match was delayed to 15:15, due to traffic congestion for fans	Souttar (yellow card) 38'; Thompson (yellow card) 54'; Clarke (yellow card) 77'; Wilmot (yellow card) 81'	Report	Hughes (yellow card) 30'; Woodburn (yellow card) 80'; Johnson (yellow card) 81'; Evans 90+3', (yellow card) 90+5'	Stadium: Bet365 Stadium; Attendance: 20,034; Referee: Leigh Doughty

14 January 2023 27	Preston North End	0–4	Norwich City	Preston
15:00 GMT	Cannon (yellow card) 59'; Brady (yellow card) 74'; Lindsay (yellow card) 76'; Ledson (yellow card) 79'	Report	Pukki 13', 69'; Dowell 16', 28'; Sara (yellow card) 44'; Hanley (yellow card) 55'; Giannoulis (yellow card) 61'; Idah (yellow card) 88'	Stadium: Deepdale; Attendance: 11,650; Referee: Steve Martin

21 January 2023 28	Birmingham City	1–2	Preston North End	Bordesley
15:00 GMT	Mejbri (yellow card) 32'; Chong (yellow card) 45+1'; Bacuna (yellow card) 79'; Jutkiewicz 83', (yellow card) 90+1'	Report	Ledson 10'; Browne 15'; Brady (yellow card) 45'	Stadium: St Andrew's Stadium; Attendance: 16,608; Referee: Rebecca Welch

4 February 2023 29	Preston North End	1–2	Bristol City	Preston
15:00 GMT	Storey (yellow card) 33'; Evans 61'		Sykes 6'; Bell 45+3'; James (yellow card) 50'; Wells (yellow card) 63'; Cornick (yellow card) 70'; Scott (yellow card) 72'	Stadium: Deepdale; Attendance: 14,261; Referee: Leigh Doughty

11 February 2023 30	Burnley	3–0	Preston North End	Burnley
15:00 GMT	Tella 15', 55', 58'; Beyer (yellow card) 57'	Report	McCann (yellow card) 28'; Delap (yellow card) 57'; Lindsay (yellow card) 90+2'	Stadium: Turf Moor; Attendance: 21,528; Referee: Darren Bond

15 February 2023 31	Preston North End	1–1	Luton Town	Preston
19:45 GMT	McCann (yellow card) 19'; Whiteman (red card) 50'; Parrott 81' (pen.); Browne (yellow card) 87'	Report	Morris 73', (yellow card) 82'; Nakamba (yellow card) 84'	Stadium: Deepdale; Attendance: 13,902 (498 Luton Town fans); Referee: Josh Smith

18 February 2023 32	Hull City	0–0	Preston North End	Kingston upon Hull
15:00 GMT	Tufan (yellow card) 33'; Pelkas (yellow card) 65'	Report	Diaby (yellow card) 76'; Álvaro Carreras (yellow card) 90+2'	Stadium: MKM Stadium; Attendance: 17,776; Referee: Sam Allison

25 February 2023 33	Preston North End	2–1	Wigan Athletic	Preston
15:00 GMT	Johnson 53' (pen.); Cannon 57', (yellow card) 77'; Brady (yellow card) 87' (yellow-red card) 90+5'; Potts (yellow card) 90+9'	Report	Cunningham 27' (o.g.); Sinani (yellow card) 86'	Stadium: Deepdale; Attendance: 17,842 (3,721 Wigan Athletic fans); Referee: Thomas Bramall

28 February 2023 34	Preston North End	0–0	Coventry City	Preston
19:45 GMT	Lindsay (yellow card) 61'	Report	Doyle (yellow card) 47'; Eccles (yellow card) 78'; Hamer (yellow card) 90'; Gyökeres (yellow card) 90+5'	Stadium: Deepdale; Attendance: 13,891 (946 Coventry City fans); Referee: John Busby

5 March 2023 35	Watford	0–0	Preston North End	Watford
15:00 GMT	Louza (yellow card) 90+5'	Report	Evans (yellow card) 47'; Diaby (yellow card) 51'; Potts (yellow card) 85'; Woodman (yellow card) 89'	Stadium: Vicarage Road; Attendance: 19,244 (1,130 PNE fans); Referee: Gavin Ward

11 March 2023 36	Preston North End	2–0	Cardiff City	Preston
15:00 GMT	Storey (yellow card) 14'; Cannon 68', (yellow card) 89'; Evans 90+4'	Report	McGuiness (yellow card) 41'; Alnwick (red card) 90+1'	Stadium: Deepdale; Attendance: 14,295 (648 Cardiff City fans); Referee: David Webb

14 March 2023 37	Rotherham United	1–2	Preston North End	Rotherham
19:45 GMT	Odoffin (yellow card) 17', (goal) 35'; Ogbene (yellow card) 42'	Report	Cannon 23'; Evans 45+2'; Potts (yellow card) 90'; Álvaro Carreras (yellow card) 90+4'	Stadium: AESSEAL New York Stadium; Attendance: 9,003 (723 PNE fans); Referee: Steve Martin

18 March 2023 38	Middlesbrough	4–0	Preston North End	Middlesbrough
15:00 GMT	Akpom 22'; Steffen (yellow card) 50'; Archer 52', 58'; Forss (yellow card) 76', (goal) 90+5'; Fry (yellow card) 78'; Bola (yellow card) 90+4'	Report	Hughes (yellow card) 45+2'; Álvaro Carreras (yellow card) 67'; Diaby (yellow card) 76' (yellow-red card) 88'; Delap (yellow card) 90+4'	Stadium: Riverside Stadium; Attendance: 28,304 (1,659 PNE fans); Referee: Matt Donohue

1 April 2023 39	Preston North End	3–1	Blackpool	Preston
12:30 BST	Potts 12', (yellow card) 15'; Lindsay (yellow card) 21'; Whiteman 26'; Cannon 51'; Johnson (yellow card) 74'	Report	Connolly (yellow card) 76'; Patino (yellow card) 82'; Yates 89'; Nelson (yellow card) 90+2'	Stadium: Deepdale; Attendance: 18,834 (2,196 away fans); Referee: Andre Marriner

7 April 2023 40	Queens Park Rangers	0–2	Preston North End	Shepherd's Bush
15:00 BST		Report	Cannon 59', 63'; Woodman (yellow card) 78'	Stadium: Loftus Road Stadium; Attendance: 14,620 (793 PNE fans); Referee: Geoff Eltringham

10 April 2023 41	Preston North End	2–1	Reading	Preston
15:00 BST	Cannon 56'; Potts 90+2', (yellow card) 90+2'	Report	Sarr (yellow card) 50'; Dann (yellow card) 64'; Ehibhatiomhan 83'; Mbengue (yellow card) off pitch'	Stadium: Deepdale; Attendance: 15,092 (436 Reading fans); Referee: John Busby

15 April 2023 42	Millwall	2–0	Preston North End	Bermondsey
15:00 BST	Bradshaw 14'; Cooper (yellow card) 65'; Flemming 72'	Report	Whiteman (yellow card) 51'; Onomah (yellow card) 81'	Stadium: The Den; Attendance: 16,488 (1,173 PNE fans); Referee: Tim Robinson

19 April 2023 43	Swansea City	4–2	Preston North End	Landore
19:45 BST	Piroe 2', 90+4'; Allen 35'; Darling 44', (yellow card) 90+9'; Cabango (yellow card) 45+1'; Latibeaudiere (yellow card) 84'; Allen (red card) off the pitch'	Report	Lindsay (yellow card) 30'; Hughes (yellow card) 43'; Cannon 48', (yellow card) 56'; Parrott 71'; Ryan Lowe (red card) off the pitch'	Stadium: Swansea.com Stadium; Attendance: 15,433 (261 PNE fans); Referee: Oliver Langford

22 April 2023 44	Preston North End	1–1	Blackburn Rovers	Preston
17:30 BST	Johnson (yellow card) 59'; Hyam 90+4' (o.g.)	Report	Szmodics (yellow card) 60', (goal) 80'; Rankin-Costello (yellow card) 85'	Stadium: Deepdale; Attendance: 20,721 (4,932 Blackburn Rovers fans); Referee: Robert Jones

29 April 2023 45	Sheffield United	4–1	Preston North End	Sheffield
15:00 BST	Ahmedhodžić 36'; Fleck 72'; Ndiaye 75', (yellow card) 76'; McBurnie 90+5', (yellow card) 90+6'	Report	Parrott (yellow card) 59'; Delap 63'	Stadium: Bramall Lane; Attendance: 30,718; Referee: Stephen Martin

6 May 2023 46	Preston North End	0–3	Sunderland	Preston
15:00 BST	Storey (yellow card) 4'; Ledson (yellow card) 84'	Report	Diallo 54'; Pritchard 61'; Clarke 65'	Stadium: Deepdale; Attendance: 21,177 (5,714 away); Referee: Bobby Madley

=== FA Cup ===
PNE entered the competition in the third round and were drawn at home to Huddersfield Town. In the fourth round draw on 8th Jan 2020, a home tie against English giants Tottenham Hotspur to be played 28th Jan 2023.

Win Draw Loss Fixtures

7 January 2023 Third round	Preston North End	3–1	Huddersfield Town	Preston
12:30 GMT	Lees 60' (o.g.); Diaby 73'; Browne 85'	Report	Ayina (yellow card) 18'; Kamberi 57'; Kasumu (yellow card) 59'; Helik (yellow card) 71'	Stadium: Deepdale; Attendance: 6,799; Referee: Anthony Backhouse

28 January 2023 Fourth round	Preston North End	0–3	Tottenham Hotspur	Preston
18:00 GMT	Cannon (yellow card) 61'	Report	Son 50', 69'; Danjuma 87'	Stadium: Deepdale; Attendance: 21,219; Referee: Peter Bankes

=== EFL Cup ===
Win Draw Loss Fixtures

PNE were drawn away to Huddersfield Town in the first round and Wolverhampton Wanderers in the second round.

9 August 2022 First round	Huddersfield Town	1–4	Preston North End	Huddersfield
19:45 BST	Rhodes 67'; Spencer (yellow card) 69'	Report	Parrott 6'; McCann 20', 30'; Potts 51'; Woodburn (yellow card) 78'	Stadium: John Smith's Stadium; Attendance: 5,550; Referee: Ross Joyce

23 August 2022 Second round	Wolverhampton Wanderers	2–1	Preston North End	Wolverhampton
19:45 BST	Jiménez 8'; Traoré 29'; Semedo (yellow card) 72'	Report	Cunningham (yellow card) 21'; Woodburn 48'	Stadium: Molineux Stadium; Attendance: 21,946; Referee: Thomas Bramall
