= Greg Cunningham =

Irish footballer (born 1991)

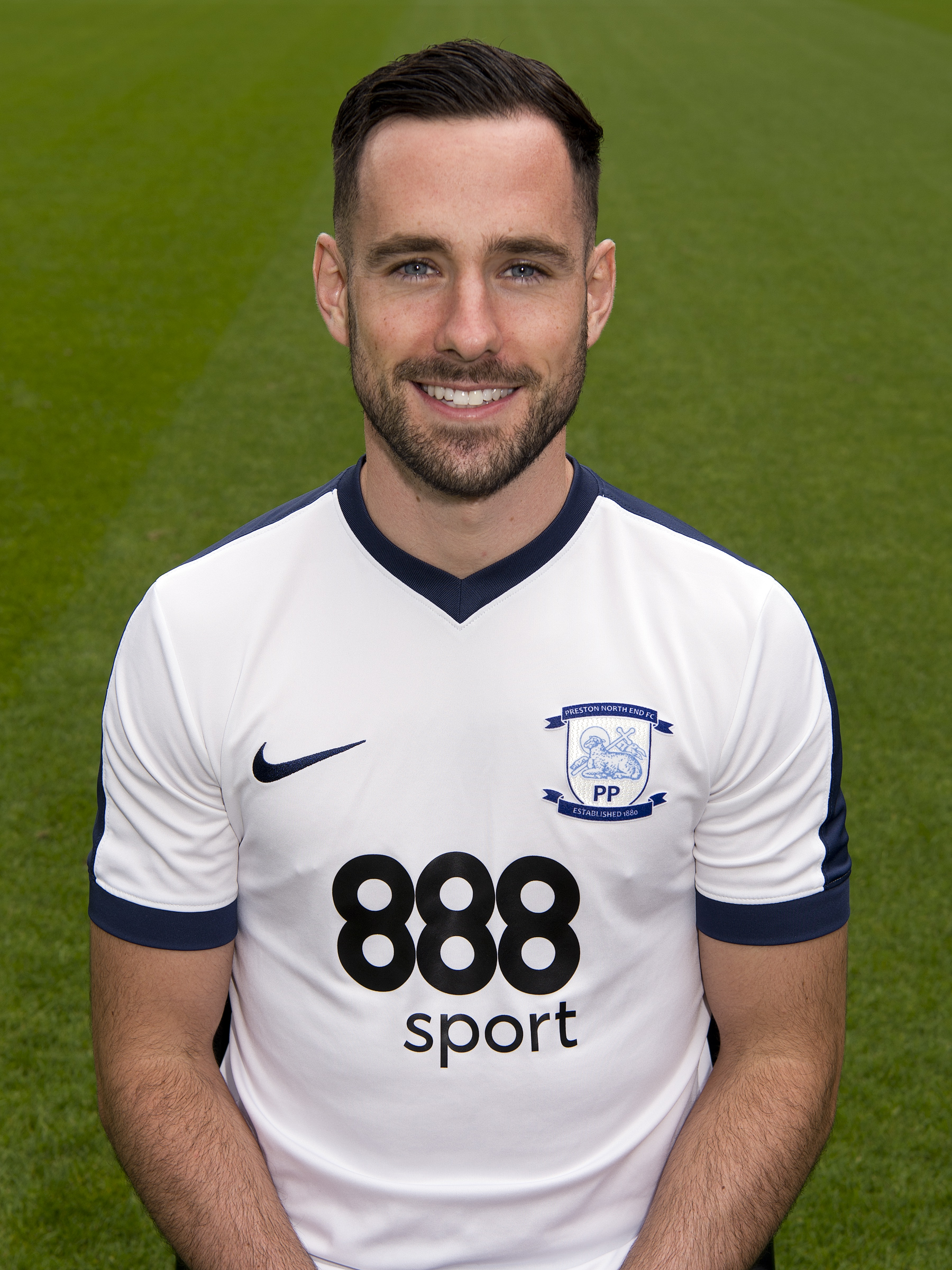
- Cunningham with Preston North End in 2016

Personal information
- Full name: Gregory Richard Cunningham
- Date of birth: 31 January 1991 (age 35)
- Place of birth: Galway, Ireland
- Height: 1.83 m (6 ft 0 in)
- Positions: Left back; centre back

Youth career
- Cregmore/Claregalway
- 2004–2007: Mervue United
- 2007–2010: Manchester City

Senior career*
Years	Team	Apps	(Gls)
2010–2012	Manchester City	2	(0)
2010–2011	→ Leicester City (loan)	13	(0)
2011–2012	→ Nottingham Forest (loan)	27	(0)
2012–2015	Bristol City	91	(4)
2015–2018	Preston North End	103	(4)
2018–2021	Cardiff City	12	(0)
2019–2020	→ Blackburn Rovers (loan)	8	(0)
2021	→ Preston North End (loan)	1	(0)
2021–2024	Preston North End	65	(3)
2024–2025	Galway United	32	(0)
Total		354	(11)

International career
2007–2008	Republic of Ireland U17	13	(3)
2009	Republic of Ireland U19	9	(0)
2011–2012	Republic of Ireland U21	6	(1)
2010–2013	Republic of Ireland	4	(0)

Managerial career
- 2026–: Salthill Devon
- * Club domestic league appearances and goals

Gregory Richard Cunningham (born 31 January 1991) is an Irish professional coach and former footballer who is the current manager of FAI National League club Salthill Devon. During his career he played as a defender for Manchester City, Leicester City, Nottingham Forest, Bristol City, Preston North End, Cardiff City, Blackburn Rovers and Galway United.

Cunningham also represented the Republic of Ireland national team, earning 4 caps between 2010 and 2013.

== Club career ==
=== Manchester City ===
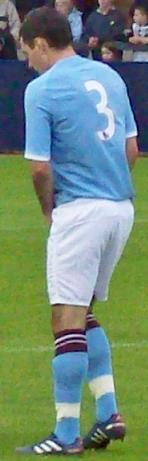
Cunningham playing for Manchester City Reserves in 2010

Born in Galway, County Galway, Cunningham began his career with Cregmore FC. In 2004, he joined Mervue United before earning a contract in the Manchester City Academy. Cunningham made his first team debut for Manchester City as a 46th minute substitute in a 4–2 victory over Scunthorpe United in the FA Cup on 24 January 2010 where he played on the left side of the City defence.

Cunningham made his first Premier League appearance on 11 April 2010 against Birmingham City as a substitute for Adam Johnson in the final minutes of the game. He made his second Premier League appearance on 9 May 2010 against West Ham United as a substitute for Johnson, just two minutes of the final minutes of the game. On 26 August 2010, Cunningham made his European debut in Europa League Qualifiers Second Leg against Politehnica Timișoara, coming on as a 54th-minute substitute for Nigel de Jong in a 2–0 win. On 22 September 2010, he made his first start for the club and played 90 minutes in a 2–1 loss against West Bromwich Albion in the League Cup.

==== Leicester City (loan) ====
On 21 October 2010, Cunningham joined Championship side Leicester City on loan until January 2011. On 23 October 2010, he made his debut for the club in a 2–0 loss against Swansea City, where he played the full 90 minutes. He became a regular left-back in the starting eleven and made 12 starts. On 1 January 2011, Cunningham fractured his tibia in a challenge with Hull City's Liam Rosenior. Rosenior was sent off and Cunningham had to be substituted in a 1–0 win for Leicester, and he was ruled out of action for up to four months, which ended his loan spell at Leicester City. After the match, Sven-Göran Eriksson stated his injury was 'a complete accident' and said:

"To be fair, there was absolutely no intention from Liam Rosenior and it was just a very unfortunate incident. Our physio team worked immediately on the injury, comforted Greg and they were superb. However, the good start to the New Year is also a bad start for us as we have lost Greg Cunningham to a broken leg."

==== Nottingham Forest (loan) ====
On 25 October 2011, Cunningham joined Championship side Nottingham Forest on loan until 31 December after an injury crisis at the club left them desperately short on defensive options. After his move to Nottingham Forest, he said he expected to make an impact for the club and was looking forward to playing regularly for the club, Nottingham Forest duo Lee Camp and Ishmael Miller agreed with Cunningham's expectations. On 29 October 2011, Cunningham made his debut for the club in a 1–0 loss against Hull City before being substituted early in the second-half. On 1 November 2011, he played 90 minutes in a 1–0 win over Reading. Since making his debut, he became a regular in the starting eleven, playing at left back.

On 29 December, Cunningham's loan was extended until the end of the season. After his loan was extended, manager Steve Cotterill said he would want to sign Cunningham on a permanent basis, only if the money could be found in the near future. After his loan spell ended, Cotterill praised Cunningham (among the loan signing) for helping the club pull away from the relegation zone and stay in the Championship next season.

=== Bristol City ===
The following season, Cunningham told BBC Sport he intended to leave Manchester City to further his career. On 5 July 2012, he signed a four-year contract at Bristol City, for an undisclosed fee.

Cunningham made his debut on the opening game of the season, in a 1–0 loss against Nottingham Forest. Then, in a 2–1 win over Peterborough United, on 18 September 2012, he received a heavy tackle from Tyrone Barnett after Barnett made a reckless challenge on him, which resulted in Cunningham being stretchered off and Barnett being booked. After the match, Derek McInnes stated his belief that Barnett should have been sent-off for the challenge Cunningham was ruled out for two months after rupturing his tendon. In mid-December, he recovered from the injury and made his return in a 2–0 loss against Derby County on 15 December 2012. On 29 January 2013, he scored his first goal for Bristol City against Watford, a cross that had looped over Manuel Almunia and found its way into the back of the net. Since his recovery from injury, Cunningham continued to retain his first team place, but the club was relegated to League One.

Cunningham was part of the squad that won promotion back to the Championship in 2015.

=== Preston North End ===
Bristol City gave Cunningham permission to speak to Preston North End after accepting an undisclosed bid, he spent the weekend with Preston in Scotland at a training camp before the deal was completed on 27 July 2015.

Cunningham became Preston's established left-back under Simon Grayson, scoring four goals including a late winner at former club Bristol City in January 2016.

On 24 July 2017, Cunningham was appointed captain of Preston until such a time as Tom Clarke became fit again.

He continued to impress as Preston became an established Championship side, and as such Cunningham began to attract the attention of other Championship and Premiership sides.

=== Cardiff City ===
With Preston unable to find the consistency to mount a sustained challenge on the playoffs, Cunningham joined Cardiff City on 13 June 2018, for an undisclosed fee, believed to be around £4 million signing a three-year contract.

However, since signing Cunningham has found his opportunities at Cardiff limited, playing only seven times as the club were relegated from the Premier League.

==== Blackburn Rovers (loan) ====
Despite relegation to the Championship, Cunningham was still unable to break into the Cardiff starting XI and on 8 August 2019 Cunningham joined Blackburn Rovers on loan until the end of the season. In October, he suffered a cruciate knee ligament injury that ruled him out for the remainder of the season. He remained with Blackburn until January, when his loan deal was terminated due to the injury.

=== Preston North End ===
On 28 January 2021, Cunningham rejoined Preston North End on loan for the remainder of the 2020–21 season. Soon after on 6 February 2021, it was announced that he had signed permanently on a deal until the end of the season, allowing Preston to fit all their loan signings in their matchday squad. On 26 April 2021, Cunningham signed a new contract that would see him remain at the club until the summer of 2023, having originally being out of contract at the end of the 2020–21 season.

On 17 May 2024, the club announced he would be released in the summer when his contract expired.

=== Galway United ===
On 17 July 2024, it was announced that Cunningham had signed for his hometown club Galway United of the League of Ireland Premier Division. On 4 October 2024, he suffered a season ending injury in a 1–1 draw with Dundalk at Eamonn Deacy Park. He made 34 appearances for the club over his 18 months there, before announcing his retirement from professional football in January 2026.

== International career ==
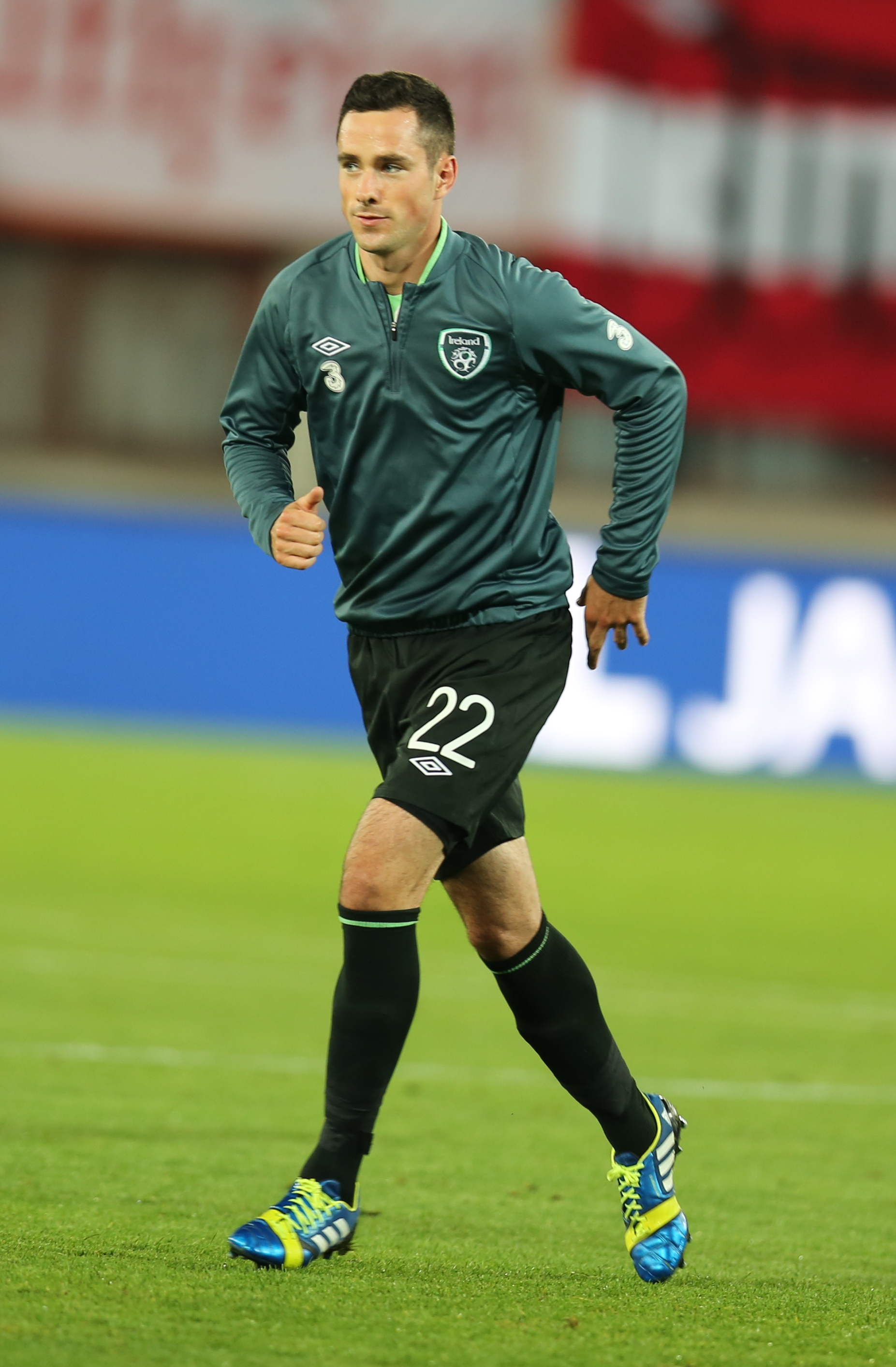
Cunningham with the Republic of Ireland in 2013

Cunningham had been capped by the Republic of Ireland at youth level before being called up to the senior international squad by manager Giovanni Trapattoni on 22 February 2010 for a friendly against Brazil. On 28 May 2010, he made his debut for Ireland in a 3–0 win against Algeria at the RDS.

== Managerial career ==
=== Salthill Devon ===
On 24 June 2026, Cunningham was appointed as the manager of Salthill Devon ahead of their first season back in the League of Ireland in 13 years, in the newly formed FAI National League.

== Career statistics ==
=== Club ===
As of match played on 10 August 2025

Appearances and goals by club, season and competition
Club	Season	League			National Cup (Note: Includes FA Cup & FAI Cup)		League Cup (Note: Includes EFL Cup)		Other		Total	
Club	Season	Division	Apps	Goals	Apps	Goals	Apps	Goals	Apps	Goals	Apps	Goals
Manchester City	2009–10	Premier League	2	0	1	0	0	0	—		3	0
Manchester City	2010–11	Premier League	0	0	0	0	1	0	1 (Note: Appearance in UEFA Europa League)	0	2	0
Manchester City	Total		2	0	1	0	1	0	1	0	5	0
Leicester City (loan)	2010–11	Championship	13	0	—		—		—		13	0
Nottingham Forest (loan)	2011–12	Championship	27	0	1	0	—		—		28	0
Bristol City	2012–13	Championship	30	1	1	0	0	0	—		31	1
Bristol City	2013–14	League One	37	1	4	0	2	0	1 (Note: Appearance(s) in Football League Trophy)	0	44	1
Bristol City	2014–15	League One	24	2	3	1	0	0	5	0	32	3
Bristol City	Total		131	4	9	1	2	0	6	0	148	5
Preston North End	2015–16	Championship	43	2	1	0	2	0	—		46	2
Preston North End	2016–17	Championship	40	1	1	0	3	0	—		44	1
Preston North End	2017–18	Championship	20	1	1	0	0	0	—		21	1
Preston North End	Total		103	4	3	0	5	0	—		111	4
Cardiff City	2018–19	Premier League	7	0	0	0	1	0	—		8	0
Cardiff City	2019–20	Championship	0	0	0	0	—		—		0	0
Cardiff City	2020–21	Championship	5	0	0	0	1	0	—		6	0
Cardiff City	Total		12	0	0	0	2	0	—		14	0
Blackburn Rovers (loan)	2019–20	Championship	8	0	—		2	0	—		10	0
Preston North End (loan)	2020–21	Championship	1	0	—		—		—		1	0
Preston North End	2020–21	Championship	10	1	—		—		—		10	1
Preston North End	2021–22	Championship	21	0	1	0	4	0	—		26	0
Preston North End	2022–23	Championship	22	2	0	0	2	0	—		24	2
Preston North End	2023–24	Championship	12	0	0	0	0	0	—		12	0
Preston North End	Total		65	3	1	0	6	0	—		72	3
Galway United	2024	LOI Premier Division	10	0	1	0	—		—		11	0
Galway United	2025	LOI Premier Division	22	0	1	0	—		—		23	0
Galway United	Total		32	0	2	0	—		—		34	0
Career total			310	11	16	1	18	0	7	0	344	12

=== International ===
As of match played 6 February 2013

Appearances and goals by national team and year
National team	Year	Apps	Goals
Republic of Ireland	2010	3	0
Republic of Ireland	2013	1	0
Total		4	0

== Honours ==
Bristol City

- Football League One: 2014–15
- Football League Trophy: 2014–15
