= Kitt Nelson =

English footballer (born 2005)

Personal information
- Full name: Kitt Edward Nelson
- Date of birth: 12 January 2005 (age 21)
- Place of birth: Burnley, England
- Height: 1.71 m (5 ft 7 in)
- Position: Midfielder

Team information
- Current team: Linfield (on loan from Preston North End)
- Number: 14

Youth career
- 2013–2023: Preston North End

Senior career*
Years	Team	Apps	(Gls)
2023–	Preston North End	0	(0)
2023–2024	→ Workington (loan)	25	(4)
2025	→ Cork City (loan)	33	(5)
2026–	→ Linfield (loan)	12	(2)
- * Club domestic league appearances and goals as of 14:21, 8 November 2026

Kitt Edward Nelson (born 12 January 2005) is an English footballer who plays as a midfielder for NIFL Premiership club Linfield on loan from EFL Championship side Preston North End.

== Personal life ==
Nelson was born in Burnley, Lancashire and raised in nearby Barrowford, attending St Thomas C.E. Primary School in the town and later Clitheroe Royal Grammar School. His father, Matt Nelson, is the lead vocalist in the English indie band Milltown Brothers.

== Career ==
=== Preston North End ===
As a youth player, Nelson joined the youth academy of Preston North End at under-9's level, and on 28 July 2023, Nelson signed his first professional contract at Deepdale; which runs until the summer of 2025.

On 3 February 2025; having featured for Preston during pre-season and then being named on the first team bench on four occasions during the campaign, Nelson signed a new deal with the Lilywhites until the summer of 2028.

==== Workington loan ====
On 30 September 2023, Nelson joined Northern Premier League side Workington on a youth loan deal originally until 28 October, and on 11 December 2023; his loan deal was extended until the end of the season. He went onto make 27 appearances for The Reds, scoring four times in the process.

==== Cork City loan ====
On 3 February 2025 having signed a new deal with Preston North End, Nelson was loaned to League of Ireland Premier Division side Cork City until 30 June 2025, and went onto to make his debut in professional football four days later, as he replaced Josh Fitzpatrick at half-time during a 2–1 loss against Cobh Ramblers in the Munster Senior Cup. A week later, Nelson made his debut in senior league football as he came on as a 77th-minute substitute for Malik Dijksteel during a 2–2 draw against Galway United in the opening game of the campaign. On 7 March, Nelson would then go onto score his first goal in senior league football during a 1–1 draw against Sligo Rovers at Turners Cross. On 21 April 2025, Nelson scored a 96th minute winner in a 2–1 victory at home to Waterford, just 7 minutes after his side had equalised. On 27 June 2025, Nelson extended his loan spell until the end of Cork's season in November.

==== Linfield loan ====
On 27 August 2026, Nelson signed for NIFL Premiership club Linfield on loan.

== Style of play ==
Nelson plays as a Midfielder and is right-footed. He can also operate as a Forward. Speaking in April 2025, while operating as a lone striker for Cork City due to an injury crisis, Nelson spoke on his versatility, stating "I'm predominantly a midfielder but have played a lot of positions. I was playing right-back before I came here and as a holding midfielder but I'd say my favourite role is as number 10. I've played up front a little bit, but mainly in a partnership. Up front by yourself is different, especially because I'm not the biggest. But I like to think I can score goals so that's all I'm thinking about when I'm playing as a striker."

== Career statistics ==
As of match played on 10 October 2026

Appearances and goals by club, season and competition
Club	Season	League			National Cup (Note: Includes FA Cup, FAI Cup & Irish Cup)		League Cup (Note: Includes EFL Cup & Northern Ireland Football League Cup)		Other		Total	
Club	Season	Division	Apps	Goals	Apps	Goals	Apps	Goals	Apps	Goals	Apps	Goals
Preston North End	2023–24	Championship	0	0	0	0	0	0	—		0	0
Preston North End	2024–25	Championship	0	0	0	0	0	0	—		0	0
Preston North End	2025–26	Championship	0	0	0	0	0	0	—		0	0
Preston North End	2026–27	Championship	0	0	0	0	0	0	—		0	0
Preston North End	Total		0	0	0	0	0	0	—		0	0
Workington (loan)	2023–24	NPL Premier Division	25	4	—		—		2 (Note: 1 appearance in the FA Trophy; 1 appearance in the Cumberland Senior Cup)	0	27	4
Cork City (loan)	2025	LOI Premier Division	33	5	4	1	—		1 (Note: Appearance in the Munster Senior Cup)	0	38	6
Linfield (loan)	2026–27	NIFL Premiership	7	1	0	0	0	0	0	0	7	1
Career total			65	10	4	1	0	0	3	0	72	11
