= Kian Best =

English footballer (born 2005)

Personal information
- Full name: Kian Andrew Best
- Date of birth: 27 August 2005 (age 21)
- Place of birth: Preston, England
- Position: Defender

Team information
- Current team: Chelsea
- Number: 85

Youth career
- –2023: Preston North End

Senior career*
Years	Team	Apps	(Gls)
2023–2025	Preston North End	13	(0)
2025	→ Bohemians (loan)	1	(0)
2025–	Chelsea	0	(0)

International career^{‡}
2023–2024	England U19	7	(2)
- * Club domestic league appearances and goals as of 16:53, 19 June 2025 (UTC) ‡ National team caps and goals as of 20:35, 24 March 2024 (UTC)

Kian Andrew Best (born 27 August 2005) is an English footballer who plays as a full-back for Premier League club Chelsea.

== Early life ==
Best attended Corpus Christi Catholic High School, Fulwood in Lancashire.

== Club career ==
In June 2021, Best agreed to two-year scholarship terms with Preston North End. In April 2023, his contract was extended by an extra year by Preston. Best made his league debut in the 2023–24 league opener against Bristol City wearing the number 33 shirt at Ashton Gate. On 29 January 2025, Best was loaned out to League of Ireland Premier Division club Bohemians until the end of June. On 9 May 2025, Preston North End announced that Best would be released following the end of his contract in June. He joined Premier League club Chelsea on 4 July 2025.

== International career ==
In November 2023, Best received his first call-up to the England U19 side. He scored and assisted on his debut on 15 November 2023, in a 6–0 win over Romania U19.

== Style of play ==
Left-footed and described as "versatile", Best is capable of playing full-back or wing-back. Since his debut in August 2023, Best started the season at left wing back before converting to a left back in a back four and left sided centre back when in a back three. Bests left foot has shown dividend in some crucial games assisting the winner against Sheffield Wednesday and being heavily involved in recent games vs Coventry and Blackburn. Preston North End manager Ryan Lowe stated in an interview that Best "has a wand of a left foot" He has also played in Preston youth teams as a left-sided centre-back and in midfield.

== Career statistics ==
As of match played 28 October 2025

Appearances and goals by club, season and competition
Club	Season	League			National Cup		League Cup		Other		Total	
Club	Season	Division	Apps	Goals	Apps	Goals	Apps	Goals	Apps	Goals	Apps	Goals
Preston North End	2023–24	EFL Championship	12	0	1	0	1	0	—		14	0
Preston North End	2024–25	EFL Championship	1	0	0	0	2	0	—		3	0
Preston North End	Total		13	0	1	0	3	0	—		17	0
Bohemians (loan)	2025	LOI Premier Division	1	0	—		—		0	0	1	0
Chelsea U21s	2025–26	—			—		—		3 (Note: Appearance(s) in EFL Trophy)	0	3	0
Career total			14	0	1	0	3	0	3	0	21	0
