= 2023–24 Preston North End F.C. season =

English football club season

Preston North End
2023–24 season
- Manager: Ryan Lowe
- Stadium: Deepdale
- EFL Championship: 10th
- FA Cup: Third round
- EFL Cup: First round
- Top goalscorer: League: Will Keane (13); All: Will Keane (13)
Home colours	Away colours	Third colours

The 2023–24 season was the 144th season in the history of Preston North End and their ninth consecutive season in the Championship. The club participated in the Championship, the FA Cup, and the EFL Cup.

== Squad ==
As of 10 February 2024

No.	Name	Position	Nationality	Place of birth	Date of birth (age)	Previous club	Date signed	Fee	Contract end
Goalkeepers
1	Freddie Woodman	GK	(England)	Croydon	4 March 1997 (age 29)	Newcastle United	1 July 2022	Undisclosed	30 June 2025
21	David Cornell	GK	(Wales)	Waunarlwydd	28 March 1991 (age 35)	Peterborough United	1 July 2022	Free	30 June 2026
Defenders
3	Greg Cunningham	LB	(Republic of Ireland)	Galway	31 January 1991 (age 35)	(Wales) Cardiff City	28 January 2021	Undisclosed	30 June 2024
5	Patrick Bauer	CB	(Germany)	Backnang	28 October 1992 (age 34)	Charlton Athletic	1 July 2019	Free	30 June 2024
6	Liam Lindsay	CB	(Scotland)	Glasgow	12 October 1995 (age 31)	Stoke City	1 July 2021	Undisclosed	30 June 2025
14	Jordan Storey	CB	(England)	Yeovil	2 September 1997 (age 29)	Exeter City	1 July 2018	£850,000	30 June 2025
16	Andrew Hughes	LB	(Wales)	Cardiff	5 June 1992 (age 34)	Peterborough United	1 July 2018	Undisclosed	30 June 2025
26	Jack Whatmough	CB	(England)	Gosport	19 August 1996 (age 30)	Wigan Athletic	2 August 2023	Free	30 June 2026
33	Kian Best	LWB	(England)		27 August 2005 (age 21)	Academy	1 July 2023	Trainee	30 June 2025
36	Josh Seary	RB	(Republic of Ireland)	(England) Liverpool	10 September 2004 (age 22)	Academy	1 July 2023	Trainee	30 June 2025
Midfielders
4	Benjamin Whiteman	CM	(England)	Rochdale	17 June 1996 (age 30)	Doncaster Rovers	14 January 2021	£1,670,000	30 June 2026
8	Alan Browne	CM	(Republic of Ireland)	Cork	15 April 1995 (age 31)	(Republic of Ireland) Cork City	1 January 2014	Undisclosed	30 June 2024
10	Mads Frøkjær-Jensen	AM	(Denmark)	Hvidovre	29 July 1999 (age 27)	(Denmark) Odense	11 July 2023	Undisclosed	30 June 2027
11	Robbie Brady	LM	(Republic of Ireland)	Dublin	14 January 1992 (age 34)	Bournemouth	4 July 2022	Free	30 June 2025
13	Ali McCann	CM	(Northern Ireland)	(Scotland) Edinburgh	4 December 1999 (age 26)	(Scotland) St Johnstone	31 August 2021	£1,400,000	30 June 2027
18	Ryan Ledson	CM	(England)	Liverpool	19 August 1997 (age 29)	Oxford United	1 July 2018	Undisclosed	30 June 2025
20	Ben Woodburn	AM	(Wales)	(England) Nottingham	15 October 1999 (age 27)	Liverpool	4 July 2022	Free	30 June 2024
25	Duane Holmes	AM	(United States)	Columbus	6 November 1994 (age 32)	Huddersfield Town	12 July 2023	Undisclosed	30 June 2025
30	Kian Taylor	CM	(England)		15 February 2005 (age 21)	Academy	1 July 2023	Trainee	30 June 2025
35	Noah Mawene	CM	(France)	Lytham St Annes	1 February 2005 (age 21)	Academy	1 July 2023	Trainee	30 June 2026
37	Kaedyn Kamara	CM	(England)	Liverpool	29 November 2005 (age 20)	Burnley	1 July 2023	Free	30 June 2025
44	Brad Potts	RM	(England)	Hexham	3 July 1994 (age 32)	Barnsley	3 January 2019	£1,600,000	30 June 2026
Forwards
7	Will Keane	CF	(Republic of Ireland)	(England) Stockport	11 January 1993 (age 33)	Wigan Athletic	14 July 2023	Undisclosed	30 June 2025
9	Ched Evans	CF	(Wales)	Rhyl	28 December 1988 (age 37)	Fleetwood Town	6 February 2021	Undisclosed	30 June 2024
17	Layton Stewart	CF	(England)	Liverpool	3 September 2002 (age 24)	Liverpool	22 July 2023	Undisclosed	30 June 2026
19	Emil Riis Jakobsen	CF	(Denmark)	Hobro	24 June 1998 (age 28)	(Denmark) Randers	1 October 2020	£1,500,000	30 June 2025
23	Liam Millar	LW	(Canada)	Toronto	27 September 1999 (age 27)	(Switzerland) Basel	1 September 2023	Loan	31 May 2024
24	Felipe Rodriguez-Gentile	CF	(Argentina)	(Brazil) Vinhedo	4 October 2006 (age 20)	Academy	1 July 2023	Trainee	30 June 2025
28	Milutin Osmajić	CF	(Montenegro)	Podgorica	25 July 1999 (age 27)	(Spain) Cádiz	1 September 2023	Undisclosed	30 June 2027
Out on Loan
29	Finlay Cross-Adair	CF	(England)		11 January 2005 (age 21)	Academy	1 July 2023	Trainee	30 June 2024
32	Lewis Leigh	CM	(England)	Preston	5 December 2003 (age 22)	Academy	1 July 2023	Trainee	30 June 2024
34	Kitt Nelson	AM	(England)		12 January 2005 (age 21)	Academy	1 July 2023	Trainee	30 June 2025
38	James Pradic	GK	(Wales)		2 July 2005 (age 21)	Charlton Athletic	1 July 2021	Free	30 June 2026

== Statistics ==
As of 24 September 2023
Players with names in italics and marked * were on loan from another club for the whole of their season with Preston North End.

No.	Pos	Nat	Player	Total		Championship		FA Cup		EFL Cup	
No.	Pos	Nat	Player	Apps	Goals	Apps	Goals	Apps	Goals	Apps	Goals
1	GK	(England) ENG	Freddie Woodman	8	0	8+0	0	0+0	0	0+0	0
3	DF	(Republic of Ireland) IRL	Greg Cunningham	1	0	0+1	0	0+0	0	0+0	0
4	MF	(England) ENG	Ben Whiteman	3	0	0+3	0	0+0	0	0+0	0
5	DF	(Germany) GER	Patrick Bauer	1	0	0+0	0	0+0	0	1+0	0
6	DF	(Scotland) SCO	Liam Lindsay	8	2	8+0	2	0+0	0	0+0	0
7	FW	(Republic of Ireland) IRL	Will Keane	6	4	5+0	4	0+0	0	1+0	0
8	MF	(Republic of Ireland) IRL	Alan Browne	9	0	8+0	0	0+0	0	0+1	0
10	MF	(Denmark) DEN	Mads Frøkjær-Jensen	9	1	5+3	1	0+0	0	0+1	0
11	MF	(Republic of Ireland) IRL	Robbie Brady	2	0	1+1	0	0+0	0	0+0	0
13	MF	(Northern Ireland) NIR	Ali McCann	8	0	6+1	0	0+0	0	0+1	0
14	DF	(England) ENG	Jordan Storey	9	0	8+0	0	0+0	0	1+0	0
16	DF	(Wales) WAL	Andrew Hughes	9	1	7+1	1	0+0	0	0+1	0
17	FW	(England) ENG	Layton Stewart	1	0	0+1	0	0+0	0	0+0	0
18	MF	(England) ENG	Ryan Ledson	9	0	8+0	0	0+0	0	0+1	0
20	MF	(Wales) WAL	Ben Woodburn	6	1	0+5	0	0+0	0	1+0	1
21	GK	(Wales) WAL	David Cornell	1	0	0+0	0	0+0	0	1+0	0
23	FW	(Canada) CAN	Liam Millar*	3	1	2+1	1	0+0	0	0+0	0
25	MF	(United States) USA	Duane Holmes	9	3	5+3	2	0+0	0	1+0	1
26	DF	(England) ENG	Jack Whatmough	7	0	2+4	0	0+0	0	1+0	0
28	FW	(Montenegro) MNE	Milutin Osmajić	3	1	3+0	1	0+0	0	0+0	0
30	MF	(England) ENG	Kian Taylor	1	0	0+0	0	0+0	0	1+0	0
32	MF	(England) ENG	Lewis Leigh	1	0	0+0	0	0+0	0	1+0	0
33	DF	(England) ENG	Kian Best	5	0	4+0	0	0+0	0	1+0	0
35	MF	(England) ENG	Noah Mawene	1	0	0+1	0	0+0	0	0+0	0
36	DF	(Republic of Ireland) IRL	Josh Seary	1	0	0+0	0	0+0	0	1+0	0
44	MF	(England) ENG	Brad Potts	8	0	8+0	0	0+0	0	0+0	0

=== Goals record ===
As of 15 February 2024

Rank	No.	Nat.	Po.	Name	Championship	FA Cup	EFL Cup	Total
1	7	(Republic of Ireland)	CF	Will Keane	11	0	0	11
2	25	(United States)	RM	Duane Holmes	3	0	1	4
3	6	(Scotland)	CB	Liam Lindsay	3	0	0	3
3	10	(Denmark)	AM	Mads Frøkjær-Jensen	3	0	0	3
3	16	(Wales)	LB	Andrew Hughes	1	0	0	1
3	20	(Wales)	AM	Ben Woodburn	0	0	1	1
3	23	(Canada)	LW	Liam Millar	4	0	0	4
3	28	(Montenegro)	CF	Milutin Osmajić	4	0	0	4
3	Own Goals				1	0	0	1
Total					13	0	2	15

=== Disciplinary record ===
As of 24 September 2023

Rank	No.	Nat.	Po.	Name	Championship			FA Cup			EFL Cup			Total		
Rank	No.	Nat.	Po.	Name	Yellow card	(yellow card) (yellow-red card)	Red card	Yellow card	(yellow card) (yellow-red card)	Red card	Yellow card	(yellow card) (yellow-red card)	Red card	Yellow card	(yellow card) (yellow-red card)	Red card
1	8	(Republic of Ireland)	CM	Alan Browne	3	0	0	0	0	0	0	0	0	3	0	0
1	18	(England)	CM	Ryan Ledson	3	0	0	0	0	0	0	0	0	3	0	0
1	25	(United States)	RM	Duane Holmes	2	0	0	0	0	0	1	0	0	3	0	0
4	13	(Northern Ireland)	CM	Ali McCann	2	0	0	0	0	0	0	0	0	2	0	0
4	44	(England)	CM	Brad Potts	2	0	0	0	0	0	0	0	0	2	0	0
6	6	(Scotland)	LB	Liam Lindsay	1	0	0	0	0	0	0	0	0	1	0	0
6	7	(Republic of Ireland)	CF	Will Keane	1	0	0	0	0	0	0	0	0	1	0	0
6	10	(Denmark)	AM	Mads Frøkjær-Jensen	1	0	0	0	0	0	0	0	0	1	0	0
6	11	(Republic of Ireland)	LM	Robbie Brady	1	0	0	0	0	0	0	0	0	1	0	0
6	26	(England)	CB	Jack Whatmough	1	0	0	0	0	0	0	0	0	1	0	0
6	28	(Montenegro)	CF	Milutin Osmajić	1	0	0	0	0	0	0	0	0	1	0	0
6	33	(England)	LB	Kian Best	0	0	0	0	0	0	1	0	0	1	0	0
Total					17	0	0	0	0	0	2	0	0	19	0	0

== Transfers ==
=== In ===
Date	Pos	Player	Transferred from	Fee	Ref
11 July 2023	AM	Mads Frøkjær-Jensen (DEN)	Odense (DEN)	Undisclosed	
12 July 2023	AM	Duane Holmes (USA)	Huddersfield Town (ENG)	Undisclosed	
14 July 2023	CF	Will Keane (IRL)	Wigan Athletic (ENG)	Undisclosed	
22 July 2023	CF	Layton Stewart (ENG)	Liverpool (ENG)	Undisclosed	
2 August 2023	CB	Jack Whatmough (ENG)	Wigan Athletic (ENG)	Free transfer	
1 September 2023	CF	Milutin Osmajić (MNE)	Cádiz (ESP)	Undisclosed	

=== Out ===
Date	Pos	Player	Transferred to	Fee	Ref
30 June 2023	AM	Aaron Bennett (WAL)	Free agent	Released	
30 June 2023	LB	Lewis Coulton (SCO)	FC United of Manchester (ENG)	Released	
30 June 2023	AM	Daniel Johnson (JAM)	Stoke City (ENG)	Rejected Contract	
30 June 2023	CB	Harry Nevin (IRL)	Free agent	Released	
30 June 2023	CM	Dana De Oliveira Amaral (ENG)	Free agent	Released	
30 June 2023	RB	Matthew Olosunde (USA)	Free agent	Released	
30 June 2023	CM	Josh Onomah (ENG)	Free agent	Withdrew Offer	
30 June 2023	CF	Rio Pemberton (ENG)	Free agent	Released	
30 June 2023	CB	Finlay Wallbank (ENG)	Workington (ENG)	Released	
29 July 2023	LB	Jacob Slater (ENG)	Brighton & Hove Albion (ENG)	Undisclosed	
2 August 2023	CB	Bambo Diaby (ESP)	Sheffield Wednesday (ENG)	Undisclosed	
1 February 2024	CF	Mikey O'Neill (ENG)	Burnley (ENG)	Undisclosed	

=== Loaned in ===
Date	Pos	Player	Loaned from	Fee	Ref
1 July 2023	RB	Calvin Ramsay (SCO)	Liverpool (ENG)	15 January 2024 (Note: On 15 January, Ramsay was recalled to Liverpool early.)	
1 September 2023	LW	Liam Millar (CAN)	Basel (SUI)	End of season	

=== Loaned out ===
Date	Pos	Player	Loaned to	Until	Ref
29 July 2023	GK	James Pradic (WAL)	Bamber Bridge (ENG)	End of Season (Note: On 5 January, Pradic's loan at Bamber Bridge was extended until the end of the season.)	
3 August 2023	CF	Finlay Cross-Adair (ENG)	Annan Athletic (SCO)	31 January 2024	
5 September 2023	CF	Mikey O'Neill (ENG)	Southport (ENG)	6 January 2024	
6 September 2023	CM	Lewis Leigh (ENG)	Bromley (ENG)	6 January 2024	
30 September 2023	AM	Kitt Nelson (ENG)	Workington (ENG)	End of Season (Note: On 11 December, Nelson's loan at Workington was extended until the end of the season.)	
8 January 2024	CM	Lewis Leigh (ENG)	Crewe Alexandra (ENG)	End of season	
9 February 2024	LB	Kacper Pasiek (POL)	Warrington Town (ENG)	End of Season (Note: On 13 March, Pasiek's loan at Warrington was extended until the end of season.)	

== Pre-season and friendlies ==
In April, PNE confirmed they would once again spend a week in Campoamor, Spain between 2–8 July 2023. The club then announced three pre-season friendlies on 30 May, against Bamber Bridge, Fleetwood Town and Stockport County. A further two, against Bury and Barrow were later added. During the trip to Spain, it was confirmed that the club would meet Bruno's Magpies. Two home friendlies against Ipswich Town and Aberdeen was next to added.

Win Draw Loss Fixtures

1 July 2023 Friendly	Bamber Bridge	0–7	Preston North End	Bamber Bridge
15:00 BST		Report	Pond 17' (o.g.); Slater 50', 63'; O'Neill 56'; Nelson 60', 77'; Rodriguez-Gentile 68'	Stadium: Sir Tom Finney Stadium

5 July 2023 Friendly	Preston North End	3–0	Bruno's Magpies	San Pedro del Pinatar, Spain
17:00 CEST; 16:00 BST	Rodriguez-Gentile 50'; Mawene 57'; Taylor 65'	Report		Stadium: Pinatar Arena; Referee: José David Martínez Montalbán

9 July 2023 Friendly	Bury	0–3	Preston North End B	Bury
15:00 BST		Report	Taylor 25'; Leigh 47'; Nelson 75'	Stadium: Gigg Lane; Attendance: 2,750; Referee: Oliver Noonan (England)

15 July 2023 Friendly	Barrow	1–0	Preston North End	Barrow-in-Furness
15:00 BST	Worrall 5'	Report		Stadium: SO Legal Stadium; Attendance: 2,026

19 July 2023 Friendly	Preston North End	1–2	Ipswich Town	Preston
19:00 BST	Rodriguez-Gentile 81'	Report	Chaplin 33'; Hirst 78'	Stadium: Deepdale; Attendance: 2,532 (349 Ipswich Town fans)

22 July 2023 Friendly	Preston North End	2–0	Aberdeen	Preston
15:00 BST	Frøkjær-Jensen 7', 18'	Report		Stadium: Deepdale; Attendance: 4,271 (1,332 Aberdeen fans); Referee: Oliver Langford

25 July 2023 Friendly	Fleetwood Town	0–0	Preston North End	Fleetwood
19:00 BST		Report		Stadium: Highbury Stadium; Referee: Jeremy Simpson

29 July 2023 Friendly	Stockport County	2–0	Preston North End	Stockport
15:00 BST	Collar 17'; Rydel 75'	Report		Stadium: Edgeley Park; Attendance: 4,200 (635 PNE fans); Referee: Thomas Kirk

== Competitions ==
=== Overall record ===
Competition	First match	Last match	Starting round	Final position	Record							
Competition	First match	Last match	Starting round	Final position	Pld	W	D	L	GF	GA	GD	Win %
Championship	5 August 2023	4 May 2024	Matchday 1	10th	46	18	9	19	56	67	−11	39.13
FA Cup	6 January 2024		Third round	Third round	1	0	0	1	0	4	−4	0.00
EFL Cup	8 August 2023		First round	First round	1	0	1	0	2	2	+0	0.00
Total					48	18	10	20	58	73	−15	37.50

Source: Soccerway

=== Championship ===
==== League table ====
Pos	Team	Pld	W	D	L	GF	GA	GD	Pts
7	Hull City	46	19	13	14	68	60	+8	70
8	Middlesbrough	46	20	9	17	71	62	+9	69
9	Coventry City	46	17	13	16	70	59	+11	64
10	Preston North End	46	18	9	19	56	67	−11	63
11	Bristol City	46	17	11	18	53	51	+2	62
12	Cardiff City	46	19	5	22	53	70	−17	62
13	Millwall	46	16	11	19	45	55	−10	59

Source: EFL official website
Rules for classification: 1) Points; 2) Goal difference; 3) Number of goals scored; 4) Head-to-head results; 5) Wins; 6) Away goals; 7) Penalty points (sec 9.5); 8) Number of 12-point sending off offences; 9) Play-off (only if needed to determine promotion/relegation)

==== Results summary ====
Overall								Home						Away					
Pld	W	D	L	GF	GA	GD	Pts	W	D	L	GF	GA	GD	W	D	L	GF	GA	GD
46	18	9	19	56	67	−11	63	11	4	8	35	36	−1	7	5	11	21	31	−10

Source: Soccerway

==== Results by round ====
Round	1	2	3	4	5	6	7	8	9	10	11	12	13	14	15	16	17	18	19	20	21	22	23	24	25	26	27	28	29	30	31	32	33	34	35	37	38	39	40	41	42	43	36^{1}	44	45	46
Ground	A	H	A	H	A	H	H	A	H	A	A	H	H	A	H	A	H	A	H	A	A	H	A	H	H	A	H	A	A	H	A	H	H	A	H	H	A	H	A	A	H	H	A	A	H	A
Result	D	W	W	W	W	W	W	D	L	L	L	D	D	L	W	W	L	L	L	D	W	L	L	W	L	L	W	L	D	W	W	W	D	W	D	L	W	W	L	D	W	L	L	L	L	L
Position	13	8	6	5	1	1	1	3	3	3	3	4	4	9	6	5	6	8	8	9	8	8	13	9	11	14	12	12	12	10	10	9	9	8	8	9	9	8	8	10	8	10	10	10	10	10

Source: Soccerway
A = Away; H = Home; W = Win; D = Draw; L = Loss; P = Postponed
Notes:
- ^{1} Matchday 36 (vs Southampton) was postponed due to a fire near to the stadium.

==== Matches ====
On 22 June, the EFL Championship fixtures were released.

Win Draw Loss Fixtures

5 August 2023 1	Bristol City	1–1	Preston North End	Ashton Gate
15:00 BST	Bell 47'	Report	Keane 86'; McCann (yellow card) 90'	Stadium: Ashton Gate Stadium; Attendance: 29,359; Referee: David Webb

12 August 2023 2	Preston North End	2–1	Sunderland	Preston
15:00 BST	Keane 25' (yellow card) 35'; Frøkjær-Jensen 59'; Browne (yellow card) 90+4'; Potts (yellow card) 90+5'	Report	Clarke 31' (pen.); Ballard (yellow card) 69'	Stadium: Deepdale; Attendance: 19,892; Referee: James Linington

19 August 2023 3	Sheffield Wednesday	0–1	Preston North End	Owlerton
15:00 BST	Vásquez (yellow card) 82'	Report	Lindsay 49'; Ledson (yellow card) 90+3'	Stadium: Hillsborough; Attendance: 25,138; Referee: Jeremy Simpson

26 August 2023 4	Preston North End	2–1	Swansea City	Preston
15:00 BST	Ledson (yellow card) 11'; Browne (yellow card) 48'; Hughes 67'; Holmes 79'	Report	Ashby 33'; Wood (yellow card) 48'	Stadium: Deepdale; Attendance: 14,464; Referee: Josh Smith

2 September 2023 5	Stoke City	0–2	Preston North End	Stoke-on-Trent
15:00 BST	Pearson (yellow card) 1'; Stevens (yellow card) 63'; Laurent (yellow card) 90+6'	Report	Lindsay (yellow card) 25'; Frøkjær-Jensen (yellow card) 45+1'; Keane 51' (pen.), 57'; Holmes (yellow card) 63'; Browne (yellow card) 67'	Stadium: Bet365 Stadium; Attendance: 22,957; Referee: Matt Donohue

16 September 2023 6	Preston North End	2–1	Plymouth Argyle	Preston
15:00 BST	Holmes 1' (yellow card) 32'; Ledson (yellow card) 22'; Millar 25'; McCann (yellow card) 89'	Report	Miller (yellow card) 19'; Hardie 61'	Stadium: Deepdale; Attendance: 17,542; Referee: Gavin Ward

19 September 2023 7	Preston North End	2–1	Birmingham City	Preston
19:45 BST	Whatmough (yellow card) 48'; Bielik 51' (o.g.); Osmajić 67', (yellow card) 68'	Report	Stansfield 46'; Bacuna (yellow card) 72'	Stadium: Deepdale; Attendance: 15,838; Referee: Dean Whitestone

23 September 2023 8	Rotherham United	1–1	Preston North End	Rotherham
15:00 BST	Hugill 35'; Rathbone (yellow card) 38'; Clucas (yellow card) 55'; Blackett (yellow card) 69'	Report	Lindsay 45'; Potts (yellow card) 59'	Stadium: AESSEAL New York Stadium; Attendance: 11,434; Referee: Sam Allison

30 September 2023 9	Preston North End	0–4	West Bromwich Albion	Preston
15:00 BST	McCann (yellow card) 35'; Potts (yellow card) 81'; Hughes (yellow card) 87'	Report	Furlong 4'; Yokuşlu (yellow card) 18'; Mowatt 29'; Phillips 62'; Bartley 87'	Stadium: Deepdale; Attendance: 16,658; Referee: Joshua Smith

4 October 2023 10	Leicester City	3–0	Preston North End	Leicester
19:45 BST	Dewsbury-Hall 60', 90'; Iheanacho 76'	Report	Woodburn (yellow card) 82'; Stewart (yellow card) 86'	Stadium: King Power Stadium; Attendance: 30,380; Referee: Thomas Bramall

7 October 2023 11	Ipswich Town	4–2	Preston North End	Ipswich
15:00 BST	Chaplin 18'; Williams 35'; Broadhead 45+1'; Jackson 78'	Report	Ledson (yellow card) 8'; Lindsay (yellow card) 22'; Frøkjær-Jensen 27'; Browne (yellow card) 31'; Whiteman 52'	Stadium: Portman Road; Attendance: 29,018; Referee: David Webb

21 October 2023 12	Preston North End	1–1	Millwall	Preston
12:30 BST	Frøkjær-Jensen 3'; Holmes (yellow card) 19'; Cunningham (yellow card) 61'; Millar (yellow card) 63'; Lindsay (yellow card) 90+3'	Report	Flemming 30'; Emakhu (yellow card) 66'	Stadium: Deepdale; Attendance: 14,427; Referee: Matt Donohue

25 October 2023 13	Preston North End	2–2	Southampton	Preston
19:45 BST	Whiteman (yellow card) 42'; Osmajić 52'; Potts 55'; Millar (yellow card) 80'; Cunningham (yellow card) 90+1'	Report	Smallbone (yellow card) 22'; Walker-Peters 33'; Bazunu (yellow card) 45+1'; Evans 90+6' (o.g.); Bednarek (yellow card) 90+8'	Stadium: Deepdale; Attendance: 15,346; Referee: Jeremy Simpson

28 October 2023 14	Hull City	1–0	Preston North End	Kingston upon Hull
15:00 BST	Lokilo (yellow card) 46'; Philogene 68'; Seri (yellow card) 77'	Report	Cunningham (yellow card) 18'; Holmes (yellow card) 55'; Potts (yellow card) 59'; Best (yellow card) 90+3'	Stadium: MKM Stadium; Attendance: 24,267; Referee: Martin Woods

4 November 2023 15	Preston North End	3–2	Coventry City	Preston
15:00 GMT	Holmes 38'; Browne 41' (pen.); Frøkjær-Jensen (yellow card) 46'; Osmajić 71'; Brady (yellow card) 90+4'	Report	Wright 33', 83'; McFadzean (yellow card) 40'; Bidwell (yellow card) 90+8'	Stadium: Deepdale; Attendance: 16,716; Referee: Anthony Taylor

10 November 2023 16	Blackburn Rovers	1–2	Preston North End	Blackburn
20:00 GMT	Szmodics 49'	Report	Browne 35'; Whiteman (yellow card) 72'; Lindsay 90'	Stadium: Ewood Park; Attendance: 20,596; Referee: Thomas Bramall

25 November 2023 17	Preston North End	1–2	Cardiff City	Preston
15:00 GMT	Evans (yellow card) 31'; Best (yellow card) 47'; Osmajić 48'; Brady (yellow card) 31' (yellow-red card) 52'; Woodman (yellow card) 77'	Sky report	Collins (yellow card) 30'; Grant 90+6'; Ugbo 90+9'	Stadium: Deepdale; Attendance: 14,593; Referee: Bobby Madley (Yorkshire)

28 November 2023 18	Middlesbrough	4–0	Preston North End	Middlesbrough
19:45 GMT	Jones 16', 37'; van den Berg 26'; Bangura 90+4'	Report	Potts (yellow card) 65'; Hughes (yellow card) 82'	Stadium: Riverside Stadium; Attendance: 24,502; Referee: Andrew Kitchen

1 December 2023 19	Preston North End	0–2	Queens Park Rangers	Preston
20:00 GMT	Woodburn (yellow card) 90+3'	Report	Dykes (yellow card) 22'; Smyth 55'; Willock 87'	Stadium: Deepdale; Attendance: 14,280; Referee: Joshua Smith

9 December 2023 20	Norwich City	0–0	Preston North End	Norwich
15:00 GMT		Report	Evans (yellow card) 76'; Storey (yellow card) 79'	Stadium: Carrow Road; Attendance: 25,761; Referee: Oliver Langford

12 December 2023 21	Huddersfield Town	1–3	Preston North End	Huddersfield
19:45 GMT	Ward 54'	Report	Browne 3'; Lindsay (yellow card) 19'; Keane 39'; Potts (yellow card) 45+2'; Whiteman 66'	Stadium: John Smith's Stadium; Attendance: 17,549; Referee: John Busby

16 December 2023 22	Preston North End	1–5	Watford	Preston
15:00 GMT	Keane 27'	Report	Bayo 42', 71'; Martins 46'; Kayembe 53'; Koné 77'	Stadium: Deepdale; Referee: Sunny Singh Gill

22 December 2023 23	Swansea City	2–1	Preston North End	Landore
19:45 GMT	Grimes (yellow card) 30'; Lowe (yellow card) 32'; Cabango (yellow card) 38'; Paterson (yellow card) 42', (goal) 60', 90+5'	Report	McCann (yellow card) 45+5'; Millar 67'; Holmes (yellow card) 74'	Stadium: Swansea.com Stadium; Attendance: 15,098; Referee: Robert Madley

26 December 2023 24	Preston North End	2–1	Leeds United	Preston, Lancashire
12:30 GMT	Potts (yellow card) 22'; McCann (yellow card) 30'; Osmajić (yellow card) 54'; Browne 57', (yellow card) 87'; Holmes (yellow card) 80'; Millar 89'	Report	Meslier (red card) 53'; Rodon (yellow card) 54'; Struijk 83' (pen.)	Stadium: Deepdale; Attendance: 21,816; Referee: Josh Smith

29 December 2023 25	Preston North End	0–1	Sheffield Wednesday	Preston
19:45 GMT	Lindsay (yellow card) 24'; Potts (yellow card) 69'; Osmajić (yellow card) 75'; Frøkjær-Jensen (yellow card) 90+6'	Report	Johnson 27'; Musaba (yellow card) 63'; Byers (red card) 85'; Dawson (yellow card) 86'	Stadium: Deepdale; Attendance: 19,763; Referee: Rebecca Welch

1 January 2024 26	Sunderland	2–0	Preston North End	Sunderland
12:30 GMT	Pritchard 10'; Rusyn 44'	Report	Lindsay (yellow card) 39'	Stadium: The Stadium of Light; Attendance: 42,714 (670 away); Referee: Oliver Langford

13 January 2024 27	Preston North End	2–0	Bristol City	Preston
15:00 GMT	Keane (yellow card) 57' (goal) 65', 77'	Report	Pring (yellow card) 50'; Cornick (yellow card) 90+5'	Stadium: Deepdale; Attendance: 14,929; Referee: Sam Barrott

21 January 2024 28	Leeds United	2–1	Preston North End	Leeds
20:00 GMT	James 6'; Summerville (yellow card) 38'; Rutter (yellow card) 67'; Firpo (yellow card) 76'; Bamford (yellow card) 85'; Piroe 90+4' (pen.)	Report	Keane 2'; Whiteman (yellow card) 8'; McCann (yellow card) 34'; Lindsay (yellow card) 62'; Cornell (yellow card) 83'; Ledson (yellow card) 85'; Stewart (yellow card) 86'	Stadium: Elland Road; Attendance: 36,570; Referee: David Webb
Note: Fixture was initially scheduled for 20 January, but was moved for TV coverage.

27 January 2024 29	Millwall	1–1	Preston North End	Bermondsey
15:00 GMT	Flemming 5' (yellow card) 90+4'; Honeyman (yellow card) 51'; Obafemi (yellow card) 90+1'	Report	Potts 33'; Storey (yellow card) 56'; Ledson (yellow card) 70'; Woodman (yellow card) 90+1'	Stadium: The Den; Attendance: 14,744; Referee: John Busby

3 February 2024 30	Preston North End	3–2	Ipswich Town	Preston
15:00 GMT	Keane 5', 39'; Edmundson 8' (o.g.)	Report	Moore 75', 87'	Stadium: Deepdale; Attendance: 17,313; Referee: Graham Scott

10 February 2024 31	Cardiff City	0–2	Preston North End	Leckwith
15:00 GMT	Alnwick (yellow card) 41'; Méïté (yellow card) 90'	Report	Jakobsen 31'; Whiteman 40'; Frøkjær-Jensen (yellow card) 74'	Stadium: Cardiff City Stadium; Attendance: 18,763; Referee: Dean Whitestone

14 February 2024 32	Preston North End	2–1	Middlesbrough	Preston
19:45 GMT	Millar 23'; Jakobsen 60'; Storey (yellow card) 86'; Browne (yellow card) 90+2'	Report	Azaz 57'; McGree (yellow card) 90+6'	Stadium: Deepdale; Attendance: 15,282; Referee: Tony Harrington

17 February 2024 33	Preston North End	2–2	Blackburn Rovers	Preston
15:00 GMT	Brady 39'; Jakobsen 43'	Report	Szmodics 7'; Gallagher 23'	Stadium: Deepdale; Attendance: 20,924; Referee: David Webb

23 February 2024 34	Coventry City	0–3	Preston North End	Coventry
19:45 GMT	Thomas (yellow card) 71'	Report	Jakobsen 1'; Keane 20'; Thomas 36' (o.g.); Whiteman (yellow card) 43'; Storey (yellow card) 54'; Woodburn (yellow card) 90'	Stadium: The Coventry Building Society Arena; Attendance: 24,500; Referee: Andy Davies
Note: Fixture was originally scheduled for 24 February, but was moved due to Coventry's FA Cup progression.

2 March 2024 35	Preston North End	0–0	Hull City	Preston
19:45 GMT	McCann (yellow card) 83'	Report	Giles (yellow card) 40'	Stadium: Deepdale; Attendance: 16,997; Referee: Thomas Bramall

9 March 2024 37	Preston North End	1–2	Stoke City	Preston
15:00 GMT	Whiteman (yellow card) 21'; McCann (yellow card) 53'; Osmajić 68'	Report	Burger (yellow card) 21'; Hughes 64' (o.g.); McNally 87'; Hoever (yellow card) 90+3'	Stadium: Deepdale; Attendance: 17,253; Referee: Josh Smith

16 March 2024 38	Plymouth Argyle	0–1	Preston North End	Plymouth
15:00 GMT	Miller (yellow card) 41'; Sousa (yellow card) 63'	Report	Keane (yellow card) 17'; Millar 43'; McCann (yellow card) 75'	Stadium: Home Park; Attendance: 16,646; Referee: John Busby

29 March 2024 39	Preston North End	3–0	Rotherham United	Preston
15:00 GMT	Holmes 22'; Jakobsen 37', 42'; Hughes (yellow card) 68'; L. Lindsay (yellow card) 74'	Report	Rathbone (yellow card) 44'; J. Lindsay (yellow card) 90+4'	Stadium: Deepdale; Attendance: 15,470; Referee: Stephen Martin

1 April 2024 40	Birmingham City	1–0	Preston North End	Bordesley
15:00 BST	Stansfield 68'; Laird (yellow card) 82'	Report	Keane (yellow card) 41'	Stadium: St Andrew's; Attendance: 24,511; Referee: Oliver Langford

6 April 2024 41	Watford	0–0	Preston North End	Watford
15:00 BST	Asprilla (yellow card) 51'; Chakvetadze (yellow card) 87'	Report	Lindsay (yellow card) 89'	Stadium: Vicarage Road; Attendance: 19,374; Referee: James Bell

9 April 2024 42	Preston North End	4–1	Huddersfield Town	Preston
19:45 BST	Holmes (yellow card) 21'; McCann (yellow card) 24'; Keane 53' (pen.); Cunningham (yellow card) 72'; Osmajić 84', 87', 90+1'	Report	Kasumu (yellow card) 26'; Koroma 42'; Matos (yellow card) 52'	Stadium: Deepdale; Attendance: 14,698; Referee: Lewis Smith

13 April 2024 43	Preston North End	0–1	Norwich City	Preston
15:00 BST	Whatmough (yellow card) 35'; Storey (yellow card) 72'; Brady (yellow card) 80'	Report	Sainz (yellow card) 38'; Sara 86'	Stadium: Deepdale; Attendance: 16,322; Referee: Andrew Kitchen

16 April 2024 36	Southampton	3–0	Preston North End	Southampton
20:00 GMT	Adams 19', 29'; Armstrong 33'	Report	Mawene (yellow card) 1'; Holmes (yellow card) 23'	Stadium: St Mary's Stadium; Attendance: 27,636; Referee: Sam Barrott
Note: Fixture was originally scheduled for 5 March, but was postponed due to a fire near to the stadium.

20 April 2024 44	Queens Park Rangers	1–0	Preston North End	Shepherd's Bush
17:15 BST	Dykes 20', (yellow card) 87'; Colback (yellow card) 36'	Report	Brady (yellow card) 58'; Ledson (yellow card) 68'; Hughes (yellow card) 76'; Storey (yellow card) 87'	Stadium: Loftus Road; Attendance: 16,464; Referee: Gavin Ward
Note: Fixture was initially scheduled for a 15:00 kick-off, but was moved for live Sky Sports coverage.

29 April 2024 45	Preston North End	0–3	Leicester City	Preston
20:00 BST	Browne (yellow card) 46'; Hughes (yellow card) 54'; Brady (yellow card) 62'; Holmes (yellow card) 90+1'	Report	Vardy 36', 52'; McAteer 67'	Stadium: Deepdale; Attendance: 19,641; Referee: Sam Allison
Note: Fixture was initially scheduled for 27 April, but was moved for live Sky Sports broadcasting.

4 May 2024 46	West Bromwich Albion	3–0	Preston North End	West Bromwich
12:30 BST	Mowatt 45+2' (pen.); Bartley 61'; Furlong 68'	Report	Lindsay (yellow card) 16'; Woodman (yellow card) 45+2'	Stadium: The Hawthorns; Attendance: 25,386; Referee: Steve Martin

=== FA Cup ===
Preston entered into the FA Cup in the third round, and were drawn away to Chelsea.

Win Draw Loss Fixtures

6 January 2024 Third round	Chelsea	4–0	Preston North End	Fulham
17:30 GMT	Broja 58'; Silva 66'; Sterling 69'; Fernández 85'	Report	Whiteman (yellow card) 68'; Holmes (yellow card) 90+4'	Stadium: Stamford Bridge; Attendance: 39,705; Referee: Thomas Bramall

=== EFL Cup ===
PNE were drawn at home to Salford City in the first round.

Win Draw Loss Fixtures

8 August 2023 First round	Preston North End	2–2 (2–4 p)	Salford City	Preston
19:45 BST	Woodburn 44'; Holmes 50' (yellow card) 50'; Best (yellow card) 90+7'	Report	McLennan 5', 38' (yellow card) 27'; Cairns (yellow card) 80'	Stadium: Deepdale; Attendance: 6,790; Referee: Tom Reeves
	Penalties
	Ledson (penalty missed); Keane (penalty scored); Best (penalty scored); Frøkjær-Jensen (penalty missed)		(penalty scored) Smith; (penalty scored) McAleny; (penalty scored) Mallan; (penalty scored) Garbutt
