= Her Game Too =

Anti-Sexism Campaign

Her Game Too is an anti-sexism campaign in UK football. It was set up by a group of female football fans in May 2021 with a video where female football fans showed sexist abuse they received from football fans. Since its launch, the campaign has reached millions around the world, with a number of professional and grassroots football clubs partnering up to eradicate sexism in football. It is registered with Companies House as a community interest company.

The campaign ran a survey of over 400 female football fans, which showed that 91.9 per cent of the 371 women surveyed by the campaign have witnessed online sexist abuse towards a woman in football, with 63.1 per cent experiencing it themselves.

The Her Game Too campaign was raised in a parliamentary debate on Football Governance by Bristol South MP Karin Smyth.

In the two years since their formation, Her Game Too have partnered with over 70 professional clubs. In May 2023, Everton F.C. became the first Premier League club to partner with Her Game Too.

== Other sports ==
While the Her Game Too campaign started, and remains most prominent in football, their founders believe that their message of hope and equality should spread to other sports. In May 2022, Her Game Too said in a statement on their website: "We believe that discrimination towards women and girls in sport is not limited to just football - so we are expanding our campaign across other sports where we can support, encourage and inspire women in the game.

In recent years, we've seen progress in the number of girl's and women's cricket teams but we know that barriers still remain. We will continue to champion female participation until girls and women are accepted and respected equally in sport."

On 25 May 2022, the campaign partnered with their first cricket clubs in Gloucestershire County Cricket Club and Western Storm. This was followed by an announcement in August 2022 that they had partnered with their first Rugby team, Bristol Bears.

== Training Centre ==
In August 2023, Her Game Too announced the launch of their first training centre for women & girls in partnership with the Women's Football Collective. The Her Game Too Training Centre runs weekly technical training sessions in Cardiff aimed at building confidence in women & girls playing football.
