= Layton Stewart =

English footballer (born 2002)

Personal information
- Full name: Layton Rhys Stewart
- Date of birth: 3 September 2002 (age 24)
- Place of birth: Liverpool, England
- Height: 5 ft 11 in (1.80 m)
- Position: Striker

Team information
- Current team: Inverness Caledonian Thistle
- Number: 9

Youth career
- 2010–2023: Liverpool

Senior career*
Years	Team	Apps	(Gls)
2019–2023	Liverpool	1	(0)
2023–2025	Preston North End	16	(0)
2025	→ Thun (loan)	15	(4)
2025–2026	Thun	8	(1)
2026	→ AFC Wimbledon (loan)	5	(0)
2026–	Inverness Caledonian Thistle	1	(1)

International career^{‡}
2019	England U18	3	(0)
- * Club domestic league appearances and goals as of 21:09, 19 September 2026 (UTC) ‡ National team caps and goals as of 10 September 2019

Layton Rhys Stewart (born 3 September 2002) is an English professional footballer who plays as a striker for Scottish Championship club Inverness Caledonian Thistle.

== Career ==
Stewart was named in the Liverpool first team squad for the first time in December 2019, for an EFL Cup tie with Aston Villa. Liverpool had named a squad of Academy players due to the first team competing in the 2019 FIFA Club World Cup in Qatar in the same week.

From Huyton, Stewart signed his first professional contract with Liverpool in February 2020. Despite suffering an anterior cruciate injury to his knee the club gave him a new contract in May 2021 as he was undergoing rehabilitation.

On 9 November 2022, Stewart made his senior debut when he started for Liverpool in a win against Derby County in the third round of the 2022–23 EFL Cup at Anfield.

=== Preston North End ===
On 22 July 2023, Stewart joined Preston North End on a three-year deal for an undisclosed fee. On 23 September 2023, Stewart made his debut for Preston in a 1–1 draw with Rotherham United, coming off the bench in the 88th minute.

On 3 January 2025, Stewart joined Swiss Challenge League leaders FC Thun on loan until the end of the season with an option to buy.

=== Inverness Caledonian Thistle ===
On 18 September 2026, Stewart signed for Scottish Championship side Inverness Caledonian Thistle. Stewart made his debut, and scored his first goal for the club, the following day against Livingston in a 2–2 away draw.

== Career statistics ==
As of match played 28 February 2025

Appearances and goals by club, season and competition
Club	Season	League			National cup		League cup (Note: Includes EFL Cup)		Continental		Other		Total	
Club	Season	Division	Apps	Goals	Apps	Goals	Apps	Goals	Apps	Goals	Apps	Goals	Apps	Goals
Liverpool U21	2019–20	—			—		—		—		2 (Note: Appearance(s) in EFL Trophy)	1	2	1
Liverpool U21	2022–23	—			—		—		—		3	1	3	1
Liverpool U21	Total		—		—		—		—		5	2	5	2
Liverpool	2019–20	Premier League	0	0	0	0	0	0	0	0	0	0	0	0
Liverpool	2022–23	Premier League	0	0	0	0	1	0	0	0	0	0	1	0
Liverpool	Total		0	0	0	0	1	0	0	0	0	0	1	0
Preston North End	2023–24	Championship	16	0	0	0	0	0	—		—		16	0
Preston North End	2024–25	Championship	0	0	0	0	0	0	—		—		0	0
Preston North End	Total		16	0	0	0	0	0	—		—		16	0
Thun (loan)	2024–25	Swiss Challenge League	5	1	0	0	—		—		—		5	1
Career total			21	1	0	0	1	0	0	0	5	2	27	1

== Honours ==
FC Thun

- Swiss Challenge League: 2024–25
