= Duane Holmes =

American soccer player (born 1994)

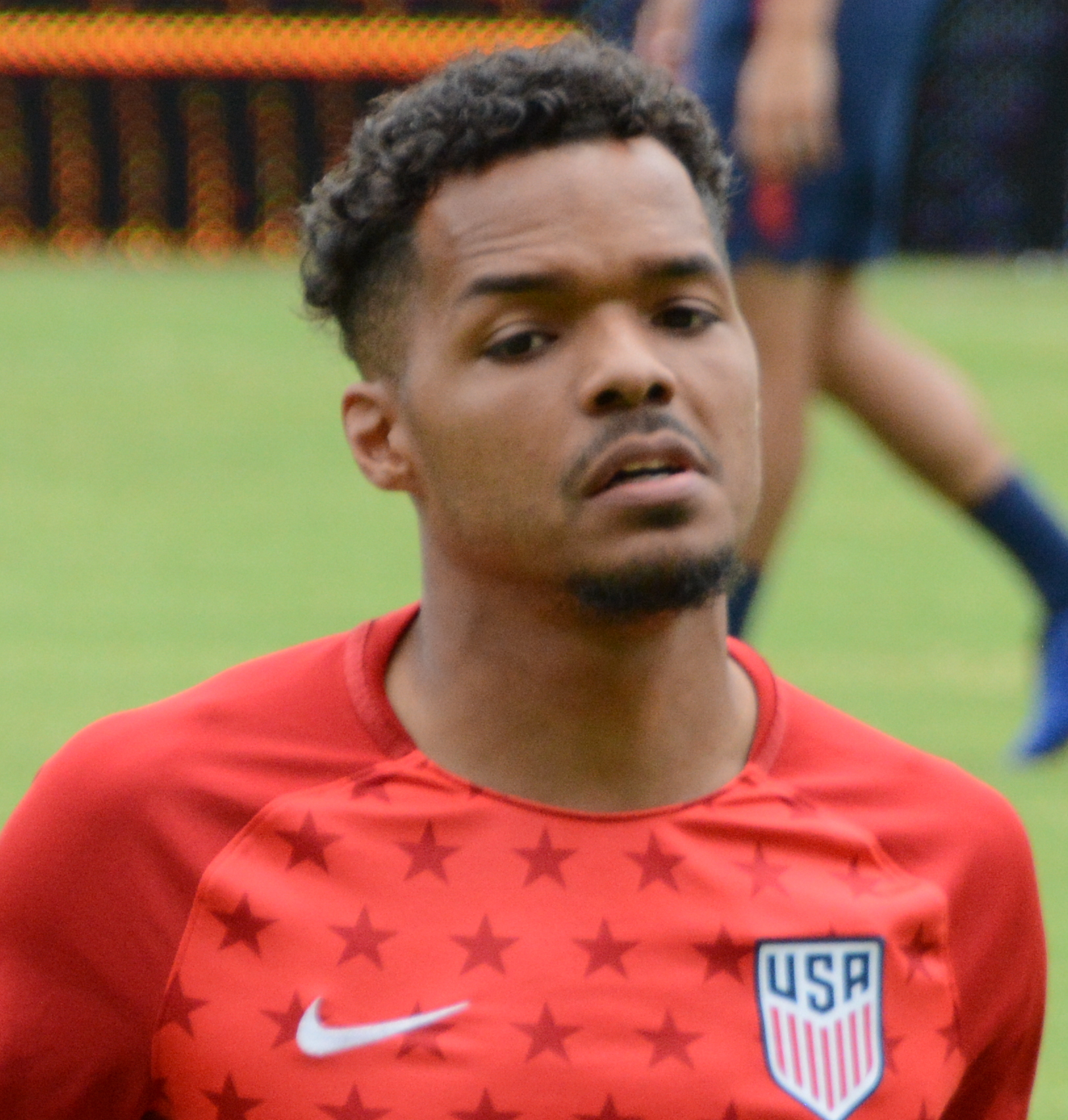
- Holmes with the United States in 2019

Personal information
- Full name: Duane Octavious Holmes
- Date of birth: November 6, 1994 (age 32)
- Place of birth: Columbus, Georgia, U.S.
- Height: 5 ft 6 in (1.68 m)
- Position: Midfielder

Team information
- Current team: Houston Dynamo
- Number: 14

Youth career
- 2002–2013: Huddersfield Town

Senior career*
Years	Team	Apps	(Gls)
2013–2016	Huddersfield Town	22	(1)
2014	→ Yeovil Town (loan)	5	(0)
2014	→ Bury (loan)	6	(0)
2016–2018	Scunthorpe United	78	(10)
2018–2021	Derby County	72	(5)
2021–2023	Huddersfield Town	81	(9)
2023–2025	Preston North End	64	(5)
2025–	Houston Dynamo	30	(1)

International career^{‡}
2019	United States	2	(0)
- * Club domestic league appearances and goals as of August 21, 2026 ‡ National team caps and goals as of June 9, 2019

Duane Octavious Holmes (born November 6, 1994) is an American professional soccer player who plays as a midfielder for Major League Soccer club Houston Dynamo.

In 2013, Holmes was shortlisted for the Football League Championship Apprentice of the Year. However, Holmes lost it to Dimitar Evtimov. Then in May 2013, Holmes signed a two-year contract, with the club having an option to extend for a further year.

== Early life ==
Born in Columbus, Georgia, United States, Holmes has an American father and an English mother. He moved to England, with his mother, at the age of 2, settling in Wakefield. Though he has dual American-British nationality, he identifies as American. He has played for junior clubs Altofts and Normanton Athletic before joining Huddersfield Town from U-9 level and then in May 2011, Holmes was among ten teenagers to be "handed two-year academy deals.

== Playing career ==
=== Huddersfield Town ===
Having been included in the first team, Holmes was given number 38 shirt. Holmes made his début for the Terriers in the Football League Cup game against Hull City at the KC Stadium on September 24, 2013, coming on as a substitute for fellow débutante Daniel Carr. He made his first league début in the 1–1 draw against Blackpool at the John Smith's Stadium on September 27, 2013, setting up the equalizer for James Vaughan. After the match, Manager Mark Robins praised Holmes' performance. He made his first start for the Terriers in the 3–2 win over Leeds United on October 26, before being subbed at half-time for Sean Scannell.

At the start of the 2014–15 season, Holmes switched shirt numbers from 39 to 19. At the end of the season, Holmes was offered a new contract by the club, and on June 22, 2015, he signed the extension.

=== Loan spells ===
On February 20, 2014, Holmes was sent out on a month's loan to fellow Championship side Yeovil Town. Holmes made his debut the following Saturday against Doncaster Rovers, earning a penalty which won Yeovil the match 1–0. Despite the fact that manager Gary Johnson was keen to extend Holmes' loan spell, he returned to Huddersfield Town on March 17, having started all five of his games at Yeovil.

On August 30, after making just one substitute appearance at the start of the season, Holmes joined League Two side Bury on loan until January 5, 2015. He made his Bury debut the next day, coming on as a substitute for Nicky Adams in the 79th minute of a 2–1 win against Accrington Stanley. He returned to Huddersfield Town on October 29, having started six of his games at Bury.

=== Scunthorpe United ===
Holmes signed for Scunthorpe United on July 7, 2016, following his release from Huddersfield Town.

He made his first appearance in an Iron shirt during the EFL CUP round 1 tie with Notts County on August 9. He came off the bench to help earn a 2–0 victory in extra time.

=== Derby County ===
Holmes signed for Derby County on August 9, 2018, for an undisclosed fee reported to be around £700k. Towards the end of his time at Derby, he displayed displeasure at being played out-wide rather than in his preferred position of down the middle. Holmes was dropped from Derby's first team in December 2020 and, after failing to make the bench in January, manager Wayne Rooney questioned Holmes' attitude, saying "He needs to perform better in training and give me an option to see if I use him or not. So that is on him to do that." With his contract approaching its end in 2021, Derby opened contract talks with Holmes but failed to agree to terms.

=== Return to Huddersfield Town ===
On January 25, 2021, Holmes rejoined Huddersfield Town on a three-and-a-half-year deal for an undisclosed fee.

=== Preston North End ===
On July 12, 2023, Holmes joined Preston North End on a two-year deal for an undisclosed fee, ending his second stint at Huddersfield Town after two and a half years.

=== Houston Dynamo ===
On March 11, 2025, Holmes signed for Major League Soccer club Houston Dynamo on a free transfer, signing a contract until the end of the 2026 season with the option to extend.

== International career ==
Born in the United States and raised in England to an American father and English mother, Holmes is eligible to play for the United States and England but has expressed interest in representing the United States. In May 2019, he was named in the 40-man provisional United States squad for the 2019 CONCACAF Gold Cup.

He made his senior team debut on June 5, 2019, against Jamaica. The following day, he was named in the final 23-man roster for the 2019 Gold Cup, but was forced to withdraw from the squad prior to the start of the tournament due to injury, being replaced by Djordje Mihailovic.

== Career statistics ==
=== Club ===
As of match played February 11, 2025

Appearances and goals by club, season and competition
Club	Season	League			FA Cup		League Cup		Other		Total	
Club	Season	Division	Apps	Goals	Apps	Goals	Apps	Goals	Apps	Goals	Apps	Goals
Huddersfield Town	2013–14	Championship	16	0	2	0	1	0	0	0	19	0
Huddersfield Town	2014–15	Championship	0	0	0	0	1	0	0	0	1	0
Huddersfield Town	2015–16	Championship	6	1	0	0	0	0	0	0	6	1
Huddersfield Town	Total		22	1	2	0	2	0	0	0	26	1
Yeovil Town (loan)	2013–14	Championship	5	0	—		—		0	0	5	0
Bury (loan)	2014–15	League Two	6	0	0	0	—		1 (Note: Appearance in the Football League Trophy)	0	7	0
Scunthorpe United	2016–17	League One	32	3	1	0	2	0	4 (Note: Three appearances in the EFL Trophy and one in the League One play-offs)	0	39	3
Scunthorpe United	2017–18	League One	45	7	3	0	2	1	4 (Note: Two appearances in the EFL Trophy and two in the League One play-offs)	1	54	9
Scunthorpe United	2018–19	League One	1	0	0	0	0	0	0	0	1	0
Scunthorpe United	Total		78	10	4	0	4	1	8	1	94	12
Derby County	2018–19	Championship	25	2	4	0	1	0	2	0	32	2
Derby County	2019–20	Championship	33	2	2	1	1	0	0	0	36	3
Derby County	2020–21	Championship	14	1	0	0	1	0	0	0	15	1
Derby County	Total		72	5	6	1	3	0	2	0	83	6
Huddersfield Town	2020–21	Championship	19	2	0	0	0	0	0	0	19	2
Huddersfield Town	2021–22	Championship	37	5	3	1	2	0	0	0	42	6
Huddersfield Town	2022–23	Championship	24	2	0	0	1	0	0	0	25	2
Huddersfield Town	Total		80	9	3	1	3	0	0	0	86	10
Preston North End	2023–24	Championship	35	4	1	0	1	1	0	0	37	5
Preston North End	2024–25	Championship	29	1	2	0	4	0	0	0	35	1
Preston North End	Total		64	5	3	0	5	1	0	0	72	6
Career total			327	30	18	2	17	2	11	1	373	35

=== International ===
As of June 10, 2019

Appearances and goals by national team and year
National team	Year	Apps	Goals
United States	2019	2	0
Total		2	0
