= 2017–18 Preston North End F.C. season =

English football club season

Preston North End
2017–18 season
- Manager: Alex Neil
- Stadium: Deepdale
- Championship: 7th
- FA Cup: 4th round
- EFL Cup: 1st round
- Top goalscorer: League: Sean Maguire (10); All: Jordan Hugill; Sean Maguire (10)
| Home colours | Away colours | Third colours |

The 2017–18 season was Preston North End's third consecutive season in the Championship, in their 138th year in existence. Along with competing in the Championship, the club also participated in the FA Cup and EFL Cup. The season covered the period from 1 July 2017 to 30 June 2018.

== Squad ==
| No. | Name | Pos. | Nationality | Place of birth | Age | Apps | Goals | Signed from | Date signed | Fee | End |
Goalkeepers
| 1 | Declan Rudd | GK | (England) | Diss | 35 | 85 | 0 | Norwich City | 1 July 2017 | £966,000 | 2020 |
| 22 | Chris Maxwell | GK | (Wales) | St Asaph | 36 | 71 | 0 | Fleetwood Town | 1 July 2016 | Free | 2020 |
| 28 | Mathew Hudson | GK | (England) | Southport | 28 | 1 | 0 | Academy | 1 July 2015 | Trainee | 2020 |
| 31 | Callum Roberts | GK | (England) | South shields | 27 | 0 | 0 | Academy | 1 July 2017 | Trainee | 2018 |
Defenders
| 3 | Greg Cunningham | LB | (Republic of Ireland) | Galway | 35 | 110 | 4 | Bristol City | 27 July 2015 | Undisclosed | 2019 |
| 5 | Tom Clarke | CB | (England) | Sowerby Bridge | 38 | 214 | 14 | Huddersfield Town | 22 May 2013 | Free | 2020 |
| 14 | Darnell Fisher | RB | (England) | Reading | 32 | 35 | 0 | Rotherham United | 27 July 2017 | Undisclosed | 2021 |
| 15 | Calum Woods | RB | (England) | Liverpool | 39 | 79 | 0 | Huddersfield Town | 1 July 2014 | Free | 2019 |
| 17 | Tommy Spurr | LB | (England) | Leeds | 39 | 24 | 1 | Blackburn Rovers | 1 July 2016 | Free | 2019 |
| 20 | Ben Davies | CB/LB | (England) | Barrow-in-Furness | 31 | 47 | 1 | Academy | 25 January 2013 | Free | 2021 |
| 23 | Paul Huntington | CB | (England) | Carlisle | 39 | 245 | 17 | Yeovil Town | 22 May 2012 | Free | 2018 |
| 32 | Josh Earl | LB/LW | (England) | Liverpool | 27 | 20 | 0 | Academy | 1 July 2017 | Trainee | 2020 |
Midfielders
| 4 | Ben Pearson | CM/DM | (England) | Oldham | 31 | 84 | 1 | Manchester United | 11 January 2016 | £115,000 | 2020 |
| 7 | Daryl Horgan | RM | (Republic of Ireland) | Galway | 34 | 44 | 4 | Dundalk | 1 January 2017 | Free | 2019 |
| 8 | Alan Browne | CM | (Republic of Ireland) | Cork | 31 | 164 | 15 | Free agent | 1 January 2014 | Free | 2020 |
| 10 | Josh Harrop | AM/CF | (England) | Stockport | 30 | 39 | 4 | Manchester United | 3 July 2017 | Undisclosed | 2021 |
| 11 | Daniel Johnson | AM | (Jamaica) | Kingston | 33 | 149 | 23 | Aston Villa | 23 January 2015 | £50,000 | 2019 |
| 12 | Paul Gallagher | AM/WG | (Scotland) | Glasgow | 42 | 222 | 32 | Leicester City | 16 June 2015 | Free | 2019 |
| 19 | John Welsh | CM | (England) | Liverpool | 41 | 176 | 3 | Tranmere Rovers | 14 May 2012 | Free | 2018 |
Forwards
| 21 | Louis Moult | CF | (England) | Stoke-on-Trent | 34 | 11 | 2 | Motherwell | 1 January 2018 | Undisclosed | 2021 |
| 24 | Sean Maguire | CF | (Republic of Ireland) | Luton | 32 | 25 | 10 | Cork City | 24 July 2017 | Undisclosed | 2021 |
| 27 | Connor Simpson | CF | (England) | Guisborough | 26 | 1 | 0 | Hartlepool United | 11 January 2018 | Undisclosed | 2020 |
| 29 | Tom Barkhuizen | RW/SS | (England) | Blackpool | 33 | 64 | 14 | Morecambe | 1 January 2017 | Free | 2020 |
| 37 | Callum Robinson | WG/CF | (England) | Northampton | 31 | 121 | 23 | Aston Villa | 4 July 2016 | Free | 2020 |
| 39 | Billy Bodin | RW/CF | (Wales) | Swindon | 34 | 19 | 1 | Bristol Rovers | 3 January 2018 | Undisclosed | 2020 |
Out on Loan
| 2 | Marnick Vermijl | RB | (Belgium) | Peer | 34 | 54 | 4 | Sheffield Wednesday | 31 August 2016 | Undisclosed | 2019 |
| 6 | Andy Boyle | CB | (Republic of Ireland) | Dublin | 35 | 12 | 0 | Dundalk | 1 January 2017 | Free | 2019 |
| 13 | Eoin Doyle | CF | (Republic of Ireland) | Dublin | 38 | 44 | 7 | Cardiff City | 1 July 2016 | Undisclosed | 2019 |
| 18 | Ben Pringle | CM/LM | (England) | Newcastle upon Tyne | 37 | 14 | 0 | Fulham | 4 July 2016 | £255,000 | 2019 |
| 25 | Kevin O'Connor | LB | (Republic of Ireland) | Enniscorthy | 22 | 9 | 0 | Cork City | 24 July 2017 | Undisclosed | 2020 |
| 30 | Melle Meulensteen | CM | (Netherlands) | Nijmegen | 27 | 0 | 0 | Academy | 1 July 2017 | Trainee | 2018 |

- All appearances and goals up to date as of 7 May 2018.

=== Statistics ===
As of 7 May 2018

| No. | Pos | Nat | Player | Total | | Championship | | FA Cup | | League Cup | |
| No. | Pos | Nat | Player | Apps | Goals | Apps | Goals | Apps | Goals | Apps | Goals |
|---|---|---|---|---|---|---|---|---|---|---|---|
| 1 | GK | (England) ENG | Declan Rudd | 18 | 0 | 16 | 0 | 2 | 0 | 0 | 0 |
| 3 | DF | (Republic of Ireland) IRL | Greg Cunningham | 21 | 1 | 20 | 1 | 1 | 0 | 0 | 0 |
| 4 | MF | (England) ENG | Ben Pearson | 34 | 0 | 34 | 0 | 0 | 0 | 0 | 0 |
| 5 | DF | (England) ENG | Tom Clarke | 20 | 2 | 14+4 | 2 | 2 | 0 | 0 | 0 |
| 7 | MF | (Republic of Ireland) IRL | Daryl Horgan | 21 | 2 | 2+17 | 1 | 2 | 1 | 0 | 0 |
| 8 | MF | (Republic of Ireland) IRL | Alan Browne | 47 | 8 | 38+6 | 6 | 2 | 2 | 0+1 | 0 |
| 10 | MF | (England) ENG | Josh Harrop | 39 | 4 | 11+27 | 2 | 1 | 2 | 0 | 0 |
| 11 | MF | (Jamaica) JAM | Daniel Johnson | 36 | 3 | 25+8 | 3 | 1+1 | 0 | 0+1 | 0 |
| 12 | MF | (Scotland) SCO | Paul Gallagher | 34 | 2 | 22+10 | 2 | 0+1 | 0 | 1 | 0 |
| 14 | DF | (England) ENG | Darnell Fisher | 34 | 0 | 33 | 0 | 1 | 0 | 0 | 0 |
| 15 | DF | (England) ENG | Calum Woods | 18 | 0 | 11+5 | 0 | 1+1 | 0 | 0 | 0 |
| 17 | DF | (England) ENG | Tommy Spurr | 5 | 0 | 5 | 0 | 0 | 0 | 0 | 0 |
| 19 | MF | (England) ENG | John Welsh | 11 | 0 | 5+4 | 0 | 2 | 0 | 0 | 0 |
| 20 | DF | (England) ENG | Ben Davies | 35 | 1 | 33+1 | 1 | 0 | 0 | 1 | 0 |
| 21 | FW | (England) ENG | Louis Moult | 11 | 2 | 3+7 | 2 | 1 | 0 | 0 | 0 |
| 22 | GK | (Wales) WAL | Chris Maxwell | 31 | 0 | 30 | 0 | 0 | 0 | 1 | 0 |
| 23 | DF | (England) ENG | Paul Huntington | 47 | 1 | 45 | 1 | 2 | 0 | 0 | 0 |
| 24 | FW | (Republic of Ireland) IRL | Sean Maguire | 25 | 10 | 19+5 | 10 | 0 | 0 | 0+1 | 0 |
| 27 | FW | (England) ENG | Connor Simpson | 1 | 0 | 0+1 | 0 | 0 | 0 | 0 | 0 |
| 29 | FW | (England) ENG | Tom Barkhuizen | 47 | 8 | 43+3 | 8 | 0+1 | 0 | 0 | 0 |
| 32 | DF | (England) ENG | Josh Earl | 20 | 0 | 16+3 | 0 | 1 | 0 | 0 | 0 |
| 37 | FW | (England) ENG | Callum Robinson | 43 | 8 | 31+10 | 8 | 1 | 0 | 1 | 0 |
| 39 | FW | (Wales) WAL | Billy Bodin | 19 | 1 | 14+3 | 1 | 2 | 0 | 0 | 0 |
Player(s) out on loan:
| 2 | DF | (Belgium) BEL | Marnick Vermijl | 3 | 0 | 0+2 | 0 | 0 | 0 | 1 | 0 |
| 6 | DF | (Republic of Ireland) IRL | Andy Boyle | 5 | 0 | 3 | 0 | 0+1 | 0 | 1 | 0 |
| 25 | DF | (Republic of Ireland) IRL | Kevin O'Connor | 9 | 0 | 4+4 | 0 | 0 | 0 | 1 | 0 |
Player(s) who left the club:
| 9 | FW | (England) ENG | Jordan Hugill | 29 | 10 | 26+1 | 8 | 0+1 | 0 | 1 | 2 |
| 16 | MF | (England) ENG | Liam Grimshaw | 1 | 0 | 0 | 0 | 0 | 0 | 1 | 0 |
| 27 | FW | (England) ENG | Stephy Mavididi | 11 | 0 | 4+6 | 0 | 0 | 0 | 1 | 0 |

=== Goals record ===
As of 7 May 2018

| Rank | No. | Nat. | Po. | Name | Championship | FA Cup | League Cup | Total |
|---|---|---|---|---|---|---|---|---|
| 1 | 24 | (Republic of Ireland) | CF | Sean Maguire | 10 | 0 | 0 | 10 |
| 1 | — | (England) | CF | Jordan Hugill | 8 | 0 | 2 | 10 |
| 3 | 8 | (Republic of Ireland) | CM | Alan Browne | 6 | 2 | 0 | 8 |
| 3 | 29 | (England) | WG | Tom Barkhuizen | 8 | 0 | 0 | 8 |
| 3 | 37 | (England) | WG | Callum Robinson | 8 | 0 | 0 | 8 |
| 6 | 10 | (England) | AM | Josh Harrop | 2 | 2 | 0 | 4 |
| 7 | 11 | (Jamaica) | AM | Daniel Johnson | 3 | 0 | 0 | 3 |
| 8 | 5 | (England) | CB | Tom Clarke | 2 | 0 | 0 | 2 |
| 8 | 7 | (Republic of Ireland) | WG | Daryl Horgan | 1 | 1 | 0 | 2 |
| 8 | 12 | (Scotland) | CM | Paul Gallagher | 2 | 0 | 0 | 2 |
| 8 | 21 | (England) | CF | Louis Moult | 2 | 0 | 0 | 2 |
| 11 | 3 | (Republic of Ireland) | LB | Greg Cunningham | 1 | 0 | 0 | 1 |
| 11 | 20 | (England) | CB | Ben Davies | 1 | 0 | 0 | 1 |
| 11 | 23 | (England) | CB | Paul Huntington | 1 | 0 | 0 | 1 |
| 11 | 39 | (Wales) | LW | Billy Bodin | 1 | 0 | 0 | 1 |
| Own Goals | | | | | 1 | 0 | 0 | 1 |
| Total | | | | | 57 | 5 | 2 | 64 |

=== Disciplinary record ===
As of 7 May 2018

| Rank | No. | Nat. | Po. | Name | Championship | | | FA Cup | | | League Cup | | | Total | | |
| Rank | No. | Nat. | Po. | Name | Booked | (yellow card) (yellow-red card) | Sent off (straight red) | Booked | (yellow card) (yellow-red card) | Sent off (straight red) | Booked | (yellow card) (yellow-red card) | Sent off (straight red) | Booked | (yellow card) (yellow-red card) | Sent off (straight red) |
|---|---|---|---|---|---|---|---|---|---|---|---|---|---|---|---|---|
| 1 | 4 | (England) | CM | Ben Pearson | 13 | 1 | 0 | 0 | 0 | 0 | 0 | 0 | 0 | 13 | 1 | 0 |
| 2 | 14 | (England) | RB | Darnell Fisher | 14 | 0 | 0 | 0 | 0 | 0 | 0 | 0 | 0 | 14 | 0 | 0 |
| 3 | 11 | (Jamaica) | AM | Daniel Johnson | 8 | 0 | 0 | 1 | 0 | 0 | 0 | 0 | 0 | 9 | 0 | 0 |
| 3 | 23 | (England) | CB | Paul Huntington | 9 | 0 | 0 | 0 | 0 | 0 | 0 | 0 | 0 | 9 | 0 | 0 |
| 5 | — | (England) | CF | Jordan Hugill | 8 | 0 | 0 | 0 | 0 | 0 | 0 | 0 | 0 | 8 | 0 | 0 |
| 6 | 12 | (Scotland) | CM | Paul Gallagher | 7 | 0 | 0 | 0 | 0 | 0 | 0 | 0 | 0 | 7 | 0 | 0 |
| 7 | 3 | (Republic of Ireland) | LB | Greg Cunningham | 4 | 1 | 0 | 0 | 0 | 0 | 0 | 0 | 0 | 4 | 1 | 0 |
| 7 | 8 | (Republic of Ireland) | CM | Alan Browne | 4 | 1 | 0 | 0 | 0 | 0 | 0 | 0 | 0 | 4 | 1 | 0 |
| 7 | 19 | (England) | CM | John Welsh | 3 | 1 | 0 | 1 | 0 | 0 | 0 | 0 | 0 | 4 | 1 | 0 |
| 10 | 10 | (England) | AM | Josh Harrop | 5 | 0 | 0 | 0 | 0 | 0 | 0 | 0 | 0 | 5 | 0 | 0 |
| 10 | 15 | (England) | RB | Calum Woods | 5 | 0 | 0 | 0 | 0 | 0 | 0 | 0 | 0 | 5 | 0 | 0 |
| 10 | 20 | (England) | CB | Ben Davies | 5 | 0 | 0 | 0 | 0 | 0 | 0 | 0 | 0 | 5 | 0 | 0 |
| 13 | 32 | (England) | LB | Josh Earl | 4 | 0 | 0 | 0 | 0 | 0 | 0 | 0 | 0 | 4 | 0 | 0 |
| 13 | 39 | (Wales) | LW | Billy Bodin | 2 | 1 | 0 | 0 | 0 | 0 | 0 | 0 | 0 | 2 | 1 | 0 |
| 15 | 1 | (England) | GK | Declan Rudd | 3 | 0 | 0 | 0 | 0 | 0 | 0 | 0 | 0 | 3 | 0 | 0 |
| 15 | 29 | (England) | WG | Tom Barkhuizen | 3 | 0 | 0 | 0 | 0 | 0 | 0 | 0 | 0 | 3 | 0 | 0 |
| 18 | 5 | (England) | CB | Tom Clarke | 2 | 0 | 0 | 0 | 0 | 0 | 0 | 0 | 0 | 2 | 0 | 0 |
| 18 | 6 | (Republic of Ireland) | CB | Andy Boyle | 1 | 0 | 0 | 1 | 0 | 0 | 0 | 0 | 0 | 2 | 0 | 0 |
| 18 | 24 | (Republic of Ireland) | CF | Sean Maguire | 2 | 0 | 0 | 0 | 0 | 0 | 0 | 0 | 0 | 2 | 0 | 0 |
| 20 | 37 | (England) | WG | Callum Robinson | 1 | 0 | 0 | 0 | 0 | 0 | 0 | 0 | 0 | 1 | 0 | 0 |
| Total | | | | | 105 | 5 | 0 | 3 | 0 | 0 | 0 | 0 | 0 | 108 | 5 | 0 |

=== Contracts ===
| Date | Position | Nationality | Name | Contract Length | Status | Expires | Ref. |
|---|---|---|---|---|---|---|---|
| 13 September 2017 | LB | (England) | Josh Earl | 3 years | Signed | June 2020 | |
| 16 October 2017 | RB | (England) | Calum Woods | 2 years | Signed | June 2019 | |
| 23 October 2017 | WG | (England) | Callum Robinson | 3 years | Signed | June 2020 | |
| 22 March 2018 | CB | (England) | Ben Davies | 3 1/2 years | Signed | June 2021 | |
| 22 May 2018 | RB | (England) | Darnell Fisher | 3 years | Signed | June 2021 | |
| 1 June 2018 | CB | (England) | Tom Clarke | 2 years | Signed | June 2020 | |
| 6 June 2018 | GK | (England) | Mathew Hudson | 2 years | Signed | June 2020 | |
| 6 June 2018 | CF | (Republic of Ireland) | Sean Maguire | 3 years | Signed | June 2021 | |
| 8 June 2018 | CM | (Scotland) (England) | Paul Gallagher | 1 year | Signed | June 2019 | |

== Transfers ==
=== Transfers in ===
| Date from | Position | Nationality | Name | From | Fee | Ref. |
|---|---|---|---|---|---|---|
| 1 July 2017 | GK | (England) | Declan Rudd | Norwich City | £966,000 | |
| 3 July 2017 | AM | (England) | Josh Harrop | Manchester United | Undisclosed | |
| 24 July 2017 | CF | (Republic of Ireland) | Sean Maguire | Cork City | Undisclosed | |
| 24 July 2017 | LB | (Republic of Ireland) | Kevin O'Connor | Cork City | Undisclosed | |
| 26 July 2017 | RB | (England) | Darnell Fisher | Rotherham United | Undisclosed | |
| 1 January 2018 | CF | (England) | Louis Moult | Motherwell | Undisclosed | |
| 3 January 2018 | RW | (Wales) | Billy Bodin | Bristol Rovers | Undisclosed | |
| 11 January 2018 | CF | (England) | Connor Simpson | Hartlepool United | Undisclosed | |

=== Transfers out ===
| Date from | Position | Nationality | Name | To | Fee | Ref. |
|---|---|---|---|---|---|---|
| 1 July 2017 | CF | (Jamaica) | Jermaine Beckford | Bury | Released | (Note: Jermaine Beckford joined Bury following his release from the club.) |
| 1 July 2017 | GK | (Denmark) | Anders Lindegaard | Burnley | Released | (Note: Anders Lindegaard joined Burnley following his release.) |
| 1 July 2017 | RB | (Wales) | Clive Smith | Free agent | Released | |
| 8 August 2017 | CF | (Scotland) | Stevie May | Aberdeen | Undisclosed fee | |
| 31 August 2017 | DM | (England) | Liam Grimshaw | Motherwell | Mutual consent | (Note: Liam Grimshaw joined Motherwell following his release from the club.) |
| 31 January 2018 | CF | (England) | Jordan Hugill | West Ham United | £10 Million | |

=== Loans in ===
| Start date | Position | Nationality | Name | From | End date | Ref. |
|---|---|---|---|---|---|---|
| 4 August 2017 | CF | (England) | Stephy Mavididi | Arsenal | 3 January 2018 | (Note: Mavididi's loan was cut short, so he could join Charlton Athletic.) |

=== Loans out ===
| Start date | Position | Nationality | Name | To | End date | Ref. |
|---|---|---|---|---|---|---|
| 31 August 2017 | CF | (Republic of Ireland) | Eoin Doyle | Oldham Athletic | January 2018 | |
| 8 September 2017 | CF | (England) | Myles Mason | Sutton Coldfield Town | 6 October 2017 | |
| 8 September 2017 | CM | (Netherlands) | Melle Meulensteen | Lancaster City | January 2018 | |
| 8 September 2017 | CM | (England) | Oscar O'Neil | Bamber Bridge | 6 October 2017 | |
| 9 January 2018 | CM | (England) | Ben Pringle | Oldham Athletic | 30 June 2018 | |
| 25 January 2018 | LB | (Republic of Ireland) | Kevin O'Connor | Fleetwood Town | 30 June 2018 | |
| 30 January 2018 | CB | (Republic of Ireland) | Andy Boyle | Doncaster Rovers | 30 June 2018 | |
| 20 February 2018 | FW | (England) | Michael Howard | Cork City | 30 June 2018 | |

== Pre-season ==
=== Friendlies ===
As of 7 June 2017, Preston North End have announced seven pre-season friendlies against Bamber Bridge, Stockport County, Morecambe, Accrington Stanley, Burnley, Fleetwood Town and Newcastle United.

| 7 July 2017 | Bamber Bridge | 0–7 | Preston North End | Bamber Bridge |
| 19:00 BST | | Report | Davies 17'; May 35'; Robinson 42'; Barkhuizen 55'; Hugill 63', 82'; Meulensteen 80' | Stadium: Irongate; Attendance: 2,186; Referee: David McNamara |

| 15 July 2017 | Stockport County | 1–2 | Preston North End | Edgeley |
| 15:00 BST | Oswell 26' | Report | Robinson 34'; Barkhuizen 40' | Stadium: Edgeley Park; Attendance: 1,470; Referee: Joe Hull |

| 18 July 2017 | Morecambe | 0–2 | Preston North End | Morecambe |
| 19:30 BST | | Report | Barkhuizen 36'; Pearson 56' | Stadium: Globe Arena; Attendance: 974; Referee: Darren Handley |

| 19 July 2017 | Accrington Stanley | 2–3 | Preston North End | Accrington |
| 19:30 BST | Edwards 58'; Pearson 88' | Report | Browne 37'; Robinson 42'; Cunnigham 75' | Stadium: Crown Ground; Attendance: 989; Referee: Darren Handley |

| 22 July 2017 | Preston North End | 1–1 | Newcastle United | Deepdale |
| 15:00 BST | Barkhuizen 33' | Report | Mitrović 8' | Stadium: Deepdale Stadium; Attendance: 7,280 |

| 25 July 2017 | Preston North End | 1–2 | Burnley | Deepdale |
| 19:45 BST | Maguire 65' | Report | Walters 21'; Long 53' | Stadium: Deepdale Stadium; Attendance: 5,633; Referee: Rob Jones |

| 28 July 2017 | Fleetwood Town | 1–5 | Preston North End | Fleetwood |
| 19:30 | Bolger 16' | Report | Huntington 45+2'; Barkhuizen 54'; Johnson 72' (pen.); Horgan 75'; Coyle 84' (o.g.) | Stadium: Highbury Stadium; Attendance: 2,108; Referee: Michael Salisbury |

== Competitions ==
=== Championship ===
==== League table ====
| Pos | Team | Pld | W | D | L | GF | GA | GD | Pts | Promotion, qualification or relegation |
|---|---|---|---|---|---|---|---|---|---|---|
| 5 | Middlesbrough | 46 | 22 | 10 | 14 | 67 | 45 | +22 | 76 | Qualification for Championship play-offs (Note: Four teams play for one spot and promotion to the Premier League.) |
| 6 | Derby County | 46 | 20 | 15 | 11 | 70 | 48 | +22 | 75 | Qualification for Championship play-offs |
| 7 | Preston North End | 46 | 19 | 16 | 11 | 57 | 46 | +11 | 73 | |
| 8 | Millwall | 46 | 19 | 15 | 12 | 56 | 45 | +11 | 72 | |
| 9 | Brentford | 46 | 18 | 15 | 13 | 62 | 52 | +10 | 69 | |

Source: English Football League
Rules for classification: 1) Points; 2) Goal difference; 3) Number of goals scored

==== Result summary ====
| Overall | | | | | | | | Home | | | | | | Away | | | | | |
| Pld | W | D | L | GF | GA | GD | Pts | W | D | L | GF | GA | GD | W | D | L | GF | GA | GD |
|---|---|---|---|---|---|---|---|---|---|---|---|---|---|---|---|---|---|---|---|
| 46 | 19 | 16 | 11 | 57 | 46 | +11 | 73 | 9 | 8 | 6 | 26 | 22 | +4 | 10 | 8 | 5 | 31 | 24 | +7 |

Last updated: 7 May 2018.

==== Results by matchday ====
| Matchday | 1 | 2 | 3 | 4 | 5 | 6 | 7 | 8 | 9 | 10 | 11 | 12 | 13 | 14 | 15 | 16 | 17 | 18 | 19 | 20 | 21 | 22 | 23 | 24 | 25 | 26 | 27 | 28 | 29 | 30 | 31 | 32 | 33 | 34 | 35 | 36 | 37 | 38 | 39 | 40 | 41 | 42 | 43 | 44 | 45 | 46 |
|---|---|---|---|---|---|---|---|---|---|---|---|---|---|---|---|---|---|---|---|---|---|---|---|---|---|---|---|---|---|---|---|---|---|---|---|---|---|---|---|---|---|---|---|---|---|---|
| Ground | H | A | A | H | A | H | H | A | H | A | H | A | A | H | H | A | H | H | A | H | A | H | H | A | A | H | A | H | A | H | A | H | A | H | A | H | H | A | A | H | A | H | A | H | A | H |
| Result | W | D | L | W | D | D | W | W | D | W | D | D | L | L | L | L | D | W | D | W | W | W | D | D | W | L | D | D | W | W | D | D | D | L | W | W | L | W | L | L | L | W | W | D | W | W |
| Position | 7 | 9 | 12 | 7 | 7 | 10 | 5 | 4 | 4 | 4 | 6 | 5 | 7 | 9 | 10 | 14 | 13 | 11 | 13 | 10 | 10 | 9 | 8 | 9 | 8 | 9 | 10 | 11 | 9 | 7 | 7 | 7 | 9 | 9 | 9 | 8 | 8 | 8 | 10 | 10 | 11 | 11 | 8 | 9 | 7 | 7 |

Updated to match(es) played on 7 May 2018. Source: Statto.com
A = Away; H = Home; W = Win; D = Draw; L = Loss

==== Matches ====
On 21 June 2017, the league fixtures were announced.

| 5 August 2017 1 | Preston North End | 1–0 | Sheffield Wednesday | Preston |
| 15:00 BST | Pearson (yellow card) 22'; Hugill (yellow card) 67'; Johnson 79' (pen.) | Report | Forestieri (yellow card) 33'; Bannan (yellow card) 55'; Pudil (yellow card) 74' | Stadium: Deepdale; Attendance: 18,267; Referee: Tony Harrington |

| 12 August 2017 2 | Leeds United | 0–0 | Preston North End | Leeds |
| 15:00 BST | Vieira (yellow card) 74' | Report | Pearson (yellow card) 31' (yellow-red card) 60'; Cunningham (yellow card) 68' | Stadium: Elland Road; Attendance: 32,880; Referee: Scott Duncan |

| 15 August 2017 3 | Derby County | 1–0 | Preston North End | Derby |
| 19:45 BST | Johnson (yellow card) 45'; Vydra 58' (pen.); Weimann (yellow card) 90+3' | Report | Robinson (yellow card) 36'; Huntington (yellow card) 57'; Browne (yellow card) 74' | Stadium: Pride Park Stadium; Attendance: 24,371; Referee: Geoff Eltringham |

| 19 August 2017 4 | Preston North End | 1–0 | Reading | Preston |
| 15:00 BST | Pearson (yellow card) 12'; Hugill 22'; Fisher (yellow card) 38' | Report | Moore (yellow card) 19'; Evans (yellow card) 45+1'; Gunter (yellow card) 90+2' | Stadium: Deepdale; Attendance: 11,174; Referee: Andy Madley |

| 26 August 2017 5 | Middlesbrough | 0–0 | Preston North End | Middlesbrough |
| 15:00 BST | Clayton (yellow card) 65' | Report | Pearson (yellow card) 63'; Harrop (yellow card) 89' | Stadium: Riverside Stadium; Attendance: 25,295; Referee: Darren England |

| 9 September 2017 6 | Preston North End | 1–1 | Barnsley | Preston |
| 15:00 BST | Maguire 23'; Hugill (yellow card) 36' | Report | Potts 26'; McCarthy (yellow card) 50'; Pearson (yellow card) 87' | Stadium: Deepdale; Attendance: 12,813; Referee: Peter Banks |

| 12 September 2017 7 | Preston North End | 3–0 | Cardiff City | Preston |
| 19:45 BST | Fisher (yellow card) 7'; Harrop 38', (yellow card) 75'; Welsh (yellow card) 64'; Maguire 70'; Browne 78' | Report | Gunnarsson (yellow card) 24'; Bamba (yellow card) 39'; Peltier (yellow card) 82' | Stadium: Deepdale; Attendance: 10,796; Referee: Oliver Langford |

| 16 September 2017 8 | Birmingham City | 1–3 | Preston North End | Birmingham |
| 15:00 BST | Davis (yellow card) 23'; Colin 35'; Maghoma (yellow card) 54' | Report | Hugill (yellow card) 27' (goal) 60'; Earl (yellow card) 31'; Johnson 56' (yellow card) 57'; Barkhuizen 67'; Welsh (yellow card) 70' | Stadium: St Andrew's; Attendance: 21,168; Referee: Keith Stroud |

| 23 September 2017 9 | Preston North End | 0–0 | Millwall | Preston |
| 15:00 BST | Barkhuizen (yellow card) 17'; Huntington (yellow card) 45+1'; Fisher (yellow card) 84' | Report | Wallace (yellow card) 78' | Stadium: Deepdale; Attendance: 12,363; Referee: Darren Bond |

| 26 September 2017 10 | Hull City | 1–2 | Preston North End | Hull |
| 19:45 BST | Larsson (yellow card) 24'; Dawson (yellow card) 36'; McGregor (yellow card) 37'; Campbell (yellow card) 37'; Bowen 50' | Report | Barkhuizen 37'; Fisher (yellow card) 61'; Robinson 88'; Johnson (yellow card) 90+2' | Stadium: KCOM Stadium; Attendance: 15,443; Referee: James Linington |

| 30 September 2017 11 | Preston North End | 2–2 | Sunderland | Preston |
| 15:00 BST | Fisher (yellow card) 23'; Harrop 55'; Hugill 57' | Report | Honeyman 28'; McGeady 59'; Steele (yellow card) 68' | Stadium: Deepdale; Attendance: 17,621; Referee: Chris Kavanagh |

| 14 October 2017 12 | Fulham | 2–2 | Preston North End | Fulham |
| 15:00 BST | Cairney (yellow card) 67'; Norwood 74' (pen.); Odoi 90+5' | Report | Hugill 18'; Maguire 25'; Earl (yellow card) 39'; Johnson (yellow card) 51'; Woods (yellow card) 73' | Stadium: Craven Cottage; Attendance: 18,435; Referee: Darren England |

| 21 October 2017 13 | Wolverhampton Wanderers | 3–2 | Preston North End | Wolverhampton |
| 15:00 BST | Cavaleiro 44'; Bonatini 59' (pen.), 63'; Douglas (yellow card) 73'; Roderick (yellow card) 85'; Saïss (yellow card) 90+2' | Report | Browne (yellow card) 48' (yellow-red card) 90+1'; Hugill 65' (yellow card) 90'; Huntington (yellow card) 71'; Coady 76' (o.g.); Johnson (yellow card) 90+2' | Stadium: Molineux Stadium; Attendance: 27,352; Referee: Stephen Martin |

| 28 October 2017 14 | Preston North End | 2–3 | Brentford | Preston |
| 15:00 BST | Huntington (yellow card) 25'; Maguire 41'; Barkhuizen 66'; Woods (yellow card) 82' | Report | Yennaris 25'; Sawyers 56'; Watkins 69' | Stadium: Deepdale; Attendance: 12,005; Referee: David Coote |

| 1 November 2017 15 | Preston North End | 0–2 | Aston Villa | Preston |
| 19:45 GMT | Browne (yellow card) 55' | Report | Chester 12'; Snodgrass 33'; Davis (yellow card) 63' | Stadium: Deepdale; Attendance: 14,212; Referee: Peter Bankes |

| 4 November 2017 16 | Ipswich Town | 3–0 | Preston North End | Ipswich |
| 15:00 GMT | McGoldrick (yellow card) 25' (goal) 49'; Waghorn 45+1'; Celina 64' | Report | Hugill (yellow card) 23'; Welsh (yellow card) 45'; Pearson (yellow card) 84' | Stadium: Portman Road; Attendance: 14,390; Referee: Andrew Madley |

| 17 November 2017 17 | Preston North End | 0–0 | Bolton Wanderers | Preston |
| 19:45 GMT | Huntington (yellow card) 77'; Boyle (yellow card) 86' | Report | Henry (yellow card) 2'; Ameobi (yellow card) 53'; Beevers (yellow card) 67' | Stadium: Deepdale; Attendance: 15,213; Referee: Simon Hooper |

| 21 November 2017 18 | Bristol City | 1–2 | Preston North End | Bristol |
| 19:45 GMT | Wright (yellow card) 23'; Woodrow 90+4' | Report | Gallagher 45'; Woods (yellow card) 45+3'; Pearson (yellow card) 64'; Robinson 78'; Hugill (yellow card) 90+4' | Stadium: Ashton Gate Stadium; Attendance: 17,355; Referee: Darren Bond |

| 25 November 2017 19 | Norwich City | 1–1 | Preston North End | Norwich |
| 15:00 GMT | Maddison 34'; Vrancic (yellow card) 55'; Reed (yellow card) 63'; Oliveira (yellow card) 71' | Report | Daniel Johnson (yellow card) 6'; Fisher (yellow card) 41'; Barkhuizen 70'; Davies (yellow card) 73'; Gallagher (yellow card) 80' | Stadium: Carrow Road; Attendance: 21,167; Referee: Tim Robinson |

| 2 December 2017 20 | Preston North End | 1–0 | Queens Park Rangers | Preston |
| 15:00 GMT | Huntington (yellow card) 79'; Pearson (yellow card) 79'; Hugill 88' | Report | Mackie (red card) 22'; Luongo (yellow card) 86'; Bidwell (yellow card) 90'; Baptiste (yellow card) 90+5' (yellow-red card) 90+6' | Stadium: Deepdale; Attendance: 11,290; Referee: Jeremy Simpson |

| 9 December 2017 21 | Burton Albion | 1–2 | Preston North End | Burton upon Trent |
| 15:00 GMT | Turner (yellow card) 47'; Buxton (yellow card) 53'; Brayford (yellow card) 85'; Akins 90+3' | Report | Fisher (yellow card) 21'; Clarke 66'; Horgan 83'; Gallagher (yellow card) 89' | Stadium: Pirelli Stadium; Attendance: 3,659; Referee: Keith Stroud |

| 16 December 2017 22 | Preston North End | 1–0 | Sheffield United | Preston |
| 15:00 GMT | Paul Gallagher (yellow card) 32'; Hugill 58'; Johnson (yellow card) 87' | Report | | Stadium: Deepdale; Attendance: 15,202; Referee: Tim Robinson |

| 23 December 2017 23 | Preston North End | 1–1 | Nottingham Forest | Preston |
| 15:00 GMT | Huntington 75'; Pearson (yellow card) 86'; Gallagher (yellow card) 89' | Report | Vaughan (yellow card) 31'; Bridcutt (yellow card) 42'; Brereton (yellow card) 49', (goal) 58'; Osborn (yellow card) 68' | Stadium: Deepdale; Attendance: 13,481; Referee: Scott Duncan |

| 26 December 2017 24 | Barnsley | 0–0 | Preston North End | Barnsley |
| 15:00 GMT | Williams (yellow card) 90+2' | Report | Calum Woods (yellow card) 9'; Huntington (yellow card) 12'; Harrop (yellow card) 77' | Stadium: Oakwell; Attendance: 14,014; Referee: Geoff Eltringham |

| 29 December 2017 25 | Cardiff City | 0–1 | Preston North End | Cardiff |
| 19:45 GMT | Peltier (yellow card) 22'; Paterson (yellow card) 90+4' | Report | Barkhuizen (yellow card) 27'; Browne (yellow card) 36'; Pearson (yellow card) 48'; Clarke 90'; Hugill (yellow card) 90+4' | Stadium: Cardiff City Stadium; Attendance: 17,751; Referee: James Linington |
Note: Live on Sky TV

| 1 January 2018 26 | Preston North End | 2–3 | Middlesbrough | Preston |
| 15:00 GMT | Robinson 14'; Hugill 40'; Johnson (yellow card) 63'; Harrop (yellow card) 67' | Report | Ayala 13', 73'; Christie (yellow card) 56'; Howson 65'; Friend (yellow card) 72'; Gestede (yellow card) 89'; Randolph (yellow card) 90+2' | Stadium: Deepdale; Attendance: 15,101; Referee: David Coote |

| 13 January 2018 27 | Millwall | 1–1 | Preston North End | Bermondsey |
| 15:00 GMT | O'Brien 43'; Gregory (yellow card) 70' | Report | Pearson (yellow card) 58'; Hugill (yellow card) 77'; Robinson 80' | Stadium: The Den; Attendance: 11,751; Referee: Jeremy Simpson |

| 20 January 2018 28 | Preston North End | 1–1 | Birmingham City | Preston |
| 15:00 GMT | Davies 17'; Johnson (yellow card) 45'; Earl (yellow card) 88' | Report | Davis (yellow card) 37'; Kieftenbeld (yellow card) 59'; Gallagher 63' | Stadium: Deepdale; Attendance: 13,529; Referee: Andy Davies |

| 30 January 2018 29 | Nottingham Forest | 0–3 | Preston North End | West Bridgford |
| 19:45 GMT | Fox (yellow card) 44'; Darikwa (yellow card) 45'; Vaughan (yellow card) 86' | Report | 35' (yellow card) 75' Bodin; 60' Barkhuizen; 83' (pen.) Johnson | Stadium: The City Ground; Attendance: 22,044; Referee: Geoff Eltringham |

| 3 February 2018 30 | Preston North End | 2–1 | Hull City | Deepdale, Preston |
| 15:00 GMT | Cunningham 36'; Bodin (yellow card) 41'; Browne 45+1' (pen.); Pearson (yellow card) 66' | Report | Bowen 29'; Clark (yellow card) 90+5' | Stadium: Deepdale; Attendance: 11,605; Referee: Steve Martin |

| 10 February 2018 31 | Brentford | 1–1 | Preston North End | Brentford |
| 15:00 GMT | McEachran (yellow card) 17'; Jozefzoon 62'; Egan (yellow card) 90+1' | Report | Fisher (yellow card) 32'; Gallagher (yellow card) 63'; Barkhuizen 54'; Cunningham (yellow card) 73' (yellow-red card) 74' | Stadium: Griffin Park; Attendance: 9,194; Referee: Simon Hooper |

| 17 February 2018 32 | Preston North End | 1–1 | Wolverhampton Wanderers | Preston |
| 15:00 GMT | Browne 52' | Report | Costa 61' | Stadium: Deepdale; Attendance: 18,570; Referee: Robert Jones |

| 20 February 2018 33 | Aston Villa | 1–1 | Preston North End | Birmingham |
| 19:45 GMT | Grabban 65' | Report | Barkhuizen 37' | Stadium: Villa Park; Attendance: 30,894; Referee: Darren England |

| 24 February 2018 34 | Preston North End | 0–1 | Ipswich Town | Preston |
| 15:00 GMT | | Report | Carayol 21' | Stadium: Deepdale; Attendance: 11,511; Referee: Scott Duncan |

| 3 March 2018 35 | Bolton Wanderers | 1–3 | Preston North End | Horwich |
| 15:00 GMT | Beevers 12', (yellow card) 31'; Morais (yellow card) 36' | Report | Cunningham (yellow card) 45+2'; Gallagher (yellow card) 46'; Barkhuizen 53'; Pearson (yellow card) 64'; Maguire 77', 90+2', (yellow card) 78' | Stadium: Macron Stadium; Attendance: 18,141; Referee: Peter Bankes |

| 6 March 2018 36 | Preston North End | 2–1 | Bristol City | Preston |
| 15:00 GMT | Browne 20'; Gallagher (yellow card) 47'; Huntington (yellow card) 58'; Pearson (yellow card) 68'; Maguire 69'; Rudd (yellow card) 90+2'; Maguire (yellow card) 90+6' | Report | Brownhill (yellow card) 38'; Diédhiou 67', (yellow card) 90+2'; Reid (yellow card) 71'; Bryan (yellow card) 85'; Flint (red card) 90+1' | Stadium: Deepdale; Attendance: 11,264; Referee: Geoff Eltringham |

| 11 March 2018 37 | Preston North End | 1–2 | Fulham | Preston |
| 15:00 GMT | Maguire 76'; Woods (yellow card) 85' | Report | Mitrovic 69', 90+1'; Bettinelli (yellow card) 90+4' | Stadium: Deepdale; Attendance: 12,970; Referee: Simon Hooper |

| 17 March 2018 38 | Sunderland | 0–2 | Preston North End | Sunderland |
| 15:00 GMT | Clarke-Salter (yellow card) 34' (yellow-red card) 60' | Report | Maguire 50'; Robinson 63'; Earl (yellow card) 81' | Stadium: Stadium of Light; Attendance: 28,543; Referee: Darren Bond |

| 30 March 2018 39 | Sheffield Wednesday | 4–1 | Preston North End | Owlerton, Sheffield |
| 15:00 BST | Hutchinson (yellow card) 1'; Nuhiu (yellow card) 16', (goal) 50', 90+2'; João 52'; Forestieri 90+6' | Report | Moult 72'; Davies (yellow card) 90+5' | Stadium: Hillsborough Stadium; Attendance: 26,588; Referee: Tim Robinson |

| 2 April 2018 40 | Preston North End | 0–1 | Derby County | Preston |
| 12:45 BST | Pearson (yellow card) 43'; Fisher (yellow card) 88' | Report | Lawrence 52'; Nugent (yellow card) 68' | Stadium: Deepdale; Attendance: 13,520; Referee: Tony Harrington |

| 7 April 2018 41 | Reading | 1–0 | Preston North End | Reading |
| 15:00 BST | Barrow 12'; Bacuna (yellow card) 17'; Swift (yellow card) 60' | Report | Davies (yellow card) 11'; Fisher (yellow card) 27' | Stadium: Madejski Stadium; Attendance: 15,501; Referee: Andy Madley |

| 10 April 2018 42 | Preston North End | 3–1 | Leeds United | Preston |
| 19:45 BST | Davies (yellow card) 47'; Gallagher 49' (pen.); Maguire 52'; Browne (yellow card) 60', (goal) 82'; Clarke (yellow card) 78' | Report | Roofe 13'; O'Connor (yellow card) 63'; Ekuban (yellow card) 90' | Stadium: Deepdale; Attendance: 14,188; Referee: Lee Probert |

| 14 April 2018 43 | Queens Park Rangers | 1–2 | Preston North End | Shepherd's Bush, London |
| 15:00 BST | Smith 13'; Ingram (yellow card) 38'; Robinson (yellow card) 70'; Luongo (yellow card) 83' | Report | Cunningham (yellow card) 41'; Robinson 45', 74' | Stadium: Loftus Road; Attendance: 13,760; Referee: Robert Jones |

| 21 April 2018 44 | Preston North End | 0–0 | Norwich City | Preston |
| 15:00 BST | Clarke (yellow card) 73'; Fisher (yellow card) 87'; Cunningham (yellow card) 89' | Report | Hanley (yellow card) 27'; Lewis (yellow card) 61'; Klose (yellow card) 88'; Maddison (yellow card) 89'; Pinto (yellow card) 90+5' | Stadium: Deepdale; Attendance: 13,038; Referee: Geoff Eltringham |

| 28 April 2018 45 | Sheffield United | 0–1 | Preston North End | Sheffield |
| 15:00 BST | Fleck (yellow card) 44'; L. Evans (yellow card) 52'; Stevens (yellow card) 66'; Sharp (yellow card) 81' | Report | Fisher (yellow card) 28'; Harrop (yellow card) 31'; Browne 57'; Rudd (yellow card) 90+5' | Stadium: Bramall Lane; Attendance: 28,568; Referee: James Linington |

| 6 May 2018 46 | Preston North End | 2–1 | Burton Albion | Preston |
| 12:30 BST | Robinson 26'; Bodin (yellow card) 35' (yellow-red card) 50'; Huntington (yellow card) 82'; Moult 90+3' | Report | Boyce (yellow card) 48'; Akpan 63'; Akins (yellow card) 80' | Stadium: Deepdale; Attendance: 17,058; Referee: Andy Madley |

=== FA Cup ===
In the FA Cup, PNE entered the competition in the third round and were drawn away to Wycombe Wanderers.

| 6 January 2018 Third round | Wycombe Wanderers | 1–5 | Preston North End | High Wycombe |
| 15:00 GMT | O'Nien 45+1' | Report | Harrop 2', 85'; Browne 38', 78' (pen.); Horgan 50'; Boyle (yellow card) 89' | Stadium: Adams Park; Attendance: 4,928; Referee: Peter Bankes |

| 27 January 2018 Fourth round | Sheffield United | 1–0 | Preston North End | Sheffield |
| | Sharp 80' (pen.) | Report | | Stadium: Bramall Lane; Attendance: 15,680; Referee: Graham Scott |

=== EFL Cup ===
On 16 June 2017, Preston North End were drawn an away tie against Accrington Stanley in the first round.

| 8 August 2017 First round | Accrington Stanley | 3–2 | Preston North End | Accrington |
| 19:45 BST | Richards-Everton 20'; Clark 86'; Kee 90+3' | Report | Hugill 70', 90+1' | Stadium: Crown Ground; Attendance: 2,879; Referee: Eddie Ilderton |

== Summary ==
| Games played | 49 (46 Championship, 2 FA Cup, 1 EFL Cup) |
| Games won | 20 (19 Championship, 1 FA Cup, 0 EFL Cup) |
| Games drawn | 16 (16 Championship, 0 FA Cup, 0 EFL Cup) |
| Games lost | 13 (11 Championship, 1 FA Cup, 1 EFL Cup) |
| Goals scored | 64 (57 Championship, 5 FA Cup, 2 EFL Cup) |
| Goals conceded | 51 (46 Championship, 2 FA Cup, 3 EFL Cup) |
| Goal difference | +13 |
| Clean sheets | 15 (15 Championship, 0 FA Cup, 0 EFL Cup) |
| Yellow cards | 105 (102 Championship, 3 FA Cup, 0 EFL Cup) |
| Red cards | 5 (5 Championship, 0 FA Cup, 0 EFL Cup) |
| Worst Discipline | Ben Pearson 13 (yellow card) , 1 (yellow card) (yellow-red card) , 0 (red card) ) |
| Best result | 5–1 vs Wycombe Wanderers, 6 Jan 18 |
| Worst result | 0–3 vs Ipswich Town, 4 Nov 17 |
| Most appearances | Paul Huntington (47) |
| Top scorer | Sean Maguire (10) |
| Points | 73 |
