= Ben Davies (footballer, born 1995) =

English footballer (born 1995)

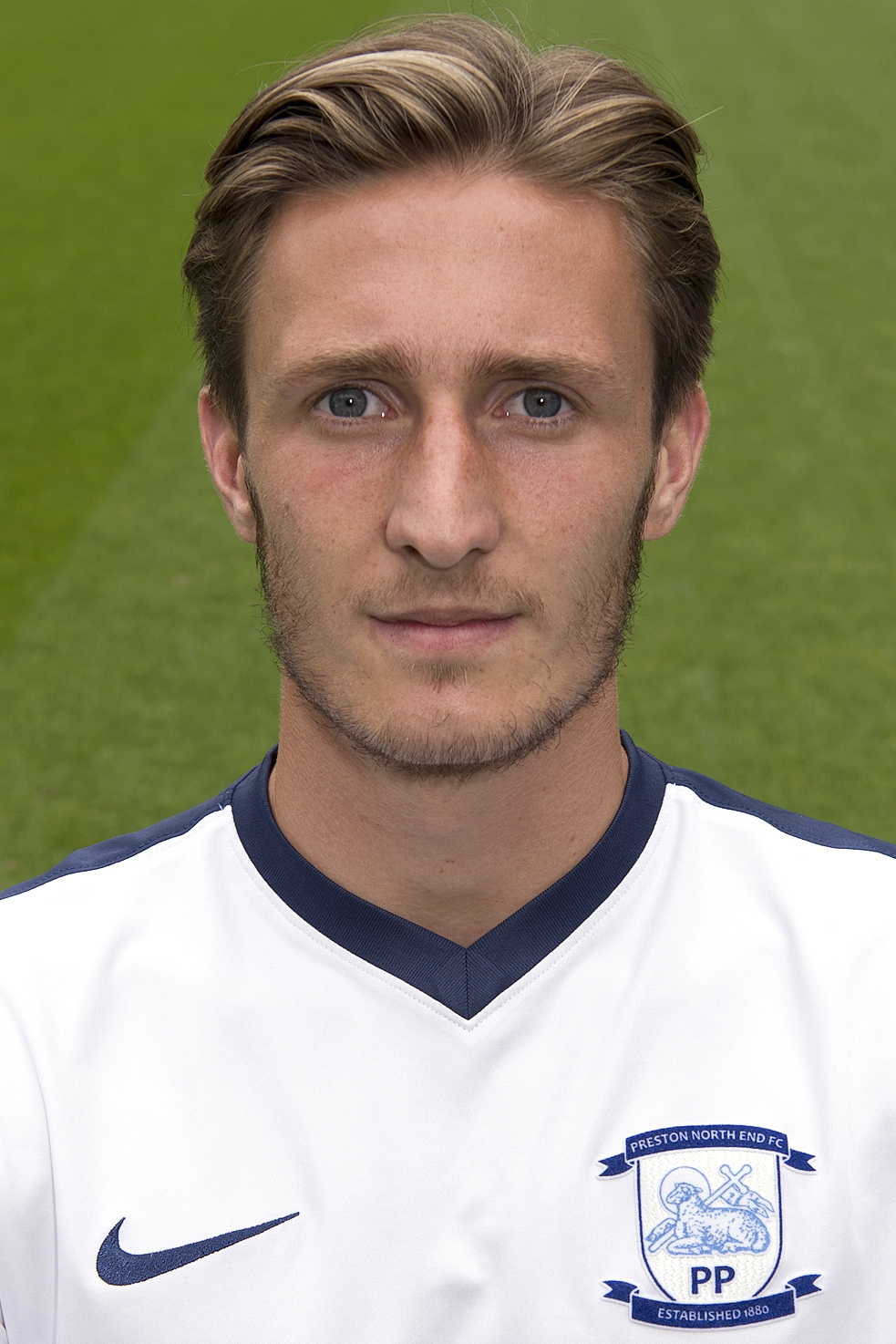
- Davies with Preston North End in 2016

Personal information
- Full name: Benjamin Keith Davies
- Date of birth: 11 August 1995 (age 31)
- Place of birth: Barrow-in-Furness, England
- Height: 6 ft 1 in (1.85 m)
- Positions: Centre-back; left-back

Team information
- Current team: Bolton Wanderers
- Number: 6

Youth career
- Preston North End

Senior career*
Years	Team	Apps	(Gls)
2013–2021	Preston North End	136	(2)
2013–2014	→ York City (loan)	44	(0)
2014	→ Tranmere Rovers (loan)	3	(0)
2015	→ Southport (loan)	9	(0)
2016	→ Newport County (loan)	19	(0)
2017	→ Fleetwood Town (loan)	22	(1)
2021–2022	Liverpool	0	(0)
2021–2022	→ Sheffield United (loan)	23	(1)
2022–2026	Rangers	36	(1)
2024–2025	→ Birmingham City (loan)	35	(1)
2025–2026	→ Oxford United (loan)	10	(0)
2026–	Bolton Wanderers	5	(0)
- * Club domestic league appearances and goals as of 23:59, 27 September 2026 (UTC)

Benjamin Keith Davies (born 11 August 1995) is an English professional footballer who plays as a centre-back or left-back for EFL Championship club Bolton Wanderers.

Davies spent most of his early career with Preston North End, and had loan spells with York City, Tranmere Rovers, Southport, Newport County and Fleetwood Town. He moved to Liverpool in 2021, but never played for the club and was loaned to Sheffield United before he was sold to Scottish club Rangers in 2022. He spent the 2024–25 season on loan at Birmingham City. On 23 August 2025 he joined Oxford United on loan for 2025/26 season.

== Career ==
=== Preston North End ===
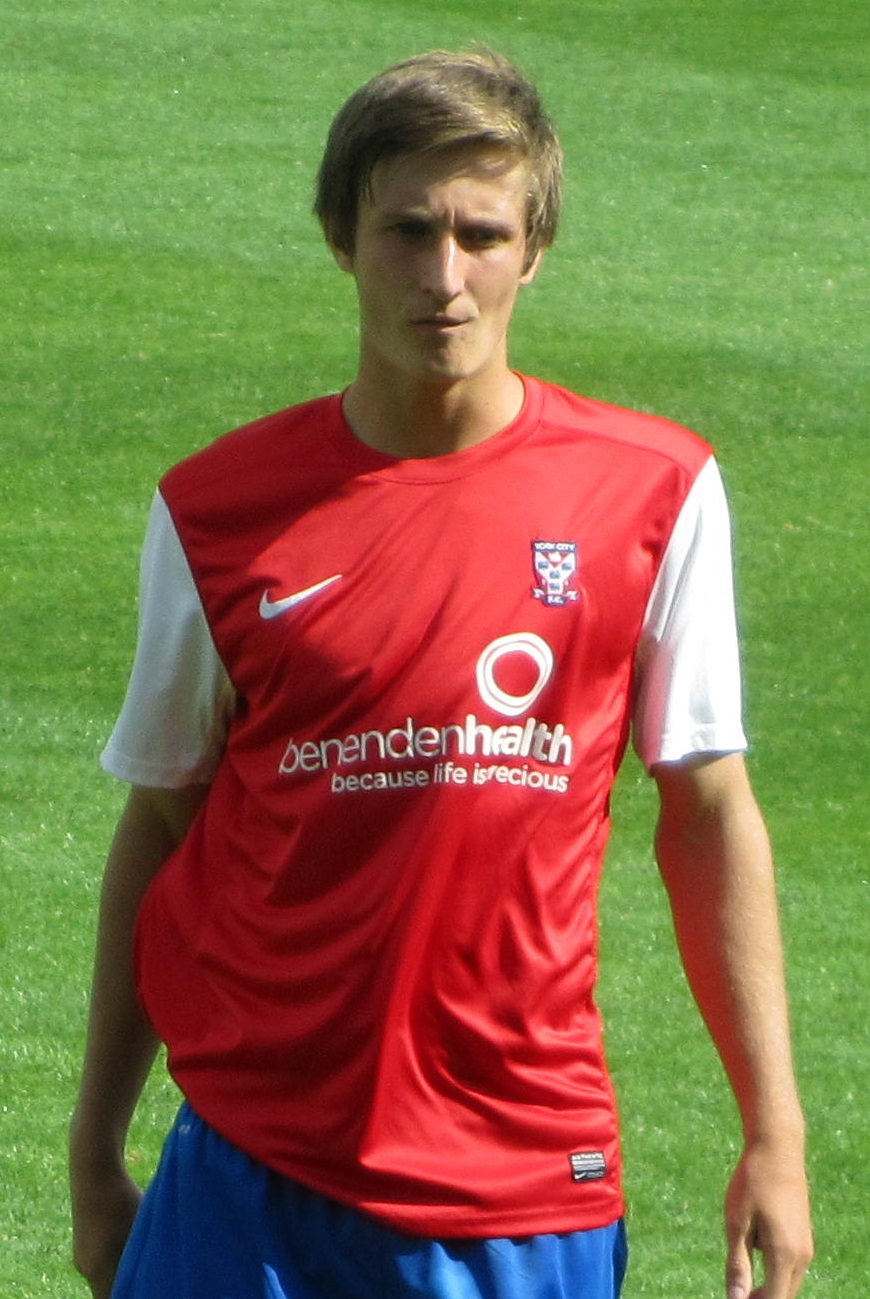
Davies playing for York City in 2013

Born in Barrow-in-Furness, Cumbria, Davies signed with the youth system at Preston North End after being spotted playing for Furness Rovers aged 11.

He made his debut for the first team in a home 2–2 draw against Coventry City on 26 January 2013 at the age of 17 years, completing 83 minutes before being replaced by David Buchanan. During the match, he provided an assist for Nicky Wroe's 60th-minute equaliser and picked up a yellow card for a foul on Cyrus Christie. He drew praise from Preston manager Graham Westley, who likened Davies' transition into the first team to that of George Boyd at Stevenage. Davies kept his place for the next match at home against Shreswbury Town.

His second match did not go as well as his debut, conceding a 90th-minute penalty (for which he picked up a booking), fouling Marvin Morgan in the penalty box. He was substituted shortly after for Paul Huntington, with Preston to ultimately lose the match.

He signed a one-year professional contract at Preston, with an option to extend for a second year, in May 2013, after being named the club's Scholar of the Year for the 2012–13 season.

Davies joined League Two club York City on 19 July 2013 on a one-month loan. He made his debut in a 1–0 home win over Northampton Town on 3 August 2013, in the first match of 2013–14. On 15 August 2013, his loan was extended until January 2014, having appeared in York's opening two matches. He played 47 times for York City as they qualified for the 2014 League Two play-offs, but lost 1–0 to Fleetwood Town in the semi-final. He signed a two-year contract extension with Preston in May 2014.

Davies joined Tranmere Rovers of League Two on 19 September 2014 on a one-month loan and made his debut a day later in a 2–1 home defeat to Exeter City. He played in four matches for Tranmere, returning to Preston once the loan ended on 22 October 2014.

He joined National League club Southport on 11 September 2015 on a one-month loan, and made his debut a day later in a 2–1 away defeat to Forest Green Rovers. Davies was recalled by Preston on 20 October 2015, to provide cover for injured defensive players, having made nine appearances for Southport.

On 7 January 2016, Davies joined Newport County of League Two on a one-month youth loan, subsequently extended until the end of 2015–16. He made 19 league appearances for Newport County.

On 2 January 2017, Davies joined League One club Fleetwood Town on loan for the remainder of 2016–17. He made his debut for the club on the same day, starting a 1–0 away win over Shrewsbury Town. He made 22 league appearances for Fleetwood Town and scored once as they qualified for the play-offs, though Fleetwood were knocked out by Bradford City in the semi-final. Davies signed a new three-year contract in July 2017.

He signed a new three-and-a-half-year deal in March 2018. Davies won Preston's Young Player of the Year award for the 2017–18 season. He won Preston's Players' Player of the Year award for the 2018–19 season, as well as the Sir Tom Finney Player of the Year award.

=== Liverpool ===
Davies signed for Premier League club Liverpool on 1 February 2021 on a long-term contract for an undisclosed fee, reported to be an initial fee of £500,000, plus £1.1 million in performance-related add-ons. Sepp van den Berg also moved in the opposite direction on loan for the rest of the season as part of the deal. Davies did not make an appearance for Liverpool during the remainder of the 2020–21 season.

He joined newly relegated Championship club Sheffield United on 16 August on loan for the 2021–22 season. He scored his first goal for Sheffield United on 23 February 2022 when he came on as a substitute and scored a late winner in a 1–0 win against Blackburn Rovers.

=== Rangers ===
Davies signed for Scottish Premiership club Rangers on 19 July 2022 on a four-year contract for an undisclosed fee, reported to be an initial £3 million, potentially rising to £4 million in add-ons.

He made his debut for the club as a substitute against Belgian side Union Saint-Gilloise during a UEFA Champions League qualifier loss on 2 August. Davies returned to English football when he joined recently relegated League One club Birmingham City on 24 August 2024 on loan for the rest of the season.

On 23 August 2025, Davies joined EFL Championship club Oxford United on loan for the rest of the season. He made his debut on 13 September in a 2–2 draw with Leicester City.

=== Bolton Wanderers ===
On 10 June 2026, Davies signed a two-year deal with EFL Championship side Bolton Wanderers.

== Style of play ==
Davies is a left-sided centre-back who can also play at left-back.

== Career statistics ==
As of match played 20 September 2026

Appearances and goals by club, season and competition
Club	Season	League			National cup (Note: Includes FA Cup, Scottish Cup)		League cup (Note: Includes Football League Cup/EFL Cup, Scottish League Cup)		Europe		Other		Total	
Club	Season	Division	Apps	Goals	Apps	Goals	Apps	Goals	Apps	Goals	Apps	Goals	Apps	Goals
Preston North End	2012–13	League One	3	0	0	0	0	0	—		0	0	3	0
Preston North End	2014–15	League One	4	0	0	0	2	0	—		0	0	6	0
Preston North End	2015–16	Championship	0	0	0	0	1	0	—		—		1	0
Preston North End	2016–17	Championship	0	0	—		2	0	—		—		2	0
Preston North End	2017–18	Championship	34	1	0	0	1	0	—		—		35	1
Preston North End	2018–19	Championship	40	1	0	0	1	0	—		—		41	1
Preston North End	2019–20	Championship	36	0	1	0	1	0	—		—		38	0
Preston North End	2020–21	Championship	19	0	0	0	0	0	—		—		19	0
Preston North End	Total		136	2	1	0	8	0	0	0	0	0	145	2
York City (loan)	2013–14	League Two	44	0	—		—		—		3 (Note: One appearance in Football League Trophy, two appearances in League Two play-offs)	0	47	0
Tranmere Rovers (loan)	2014–15	League Two	3	0	—		—		—		1 (Note: Appearance in Football League Trophy)	0	4	0
Southport (loan)	2015–16	National League	9	0	—		—		—		—		9	0
Newport County (loan)	2015–16	League Two	19	0	1	0	—		—		—		20	0
Fleetwood Town (loan)	2016–17	League One	22	1	2	0	—		—		2 (Note: Appearances in League One play-offs)	0	26	1
Liverpool	2020–21	Premier League	0	0	0	0	0	0	0	0	0	0	0	0
Liverpool	2021–22	Premier League	0	0	0	0	0	0	0	0	0	0	0	0
Liverpool	Total		0	0	0	0	0	0	0	0	0	0	0	0
Sheffield United (loan)	2021–22	Championship	23	1	0	0	0	0	—		0	0	23	1
Rangers	2022–23	Scottish Premiership	27	0	4	0	2	0	5 (Note: Appearances in UEFA Champions League)	0	—		38	0
Rangers	2023–24	Scottish Premiership	8	1	1	0	2	0	6 (Note: Appearances in UEFA Europa League)	0	—		17	1
Rangers	2024–25	Scottish Premiership	1	0	0	0	1	0	1	0	—		3	0
Rangers	2025–26	Scottish Premiership	0	0	0	0	0	0	0	0	—		0	0
Rangers	Total		36	1	5	0	5	0	12	0	0	0	58	1
Birmingham City (loan)	2024–25	League One	35	1	2	0	—		—		7 (Note: Appearances in EFL Trophy)	0	44	1
Oxford United (loan)	2025–26	Championship	10	0	1	0	0	0	—		—		11	0
Bolton Wanderers	2026–27	Championship	5	0	0	0	1	0	—		—		6	0
Career total			342	6	12	0	14	0	12	0	13	0	393	6

== Honours ==
Rangers

- Scottish League Cup: 2023–24

Birmingham City

- EFL League One: 2024–25
- EFL Trophy runner-up: 2024–25
