= 2016–17 Preston North End F.C. season =

English football club season

Preston North End
2016–17 season
- Manager: Simon Grayson
- Stadium: Deepdale
- Championship: 11th
- FA Cup: Third round
- League Cup: Fourth round
- Top goalscorer: League: Hugill (10); All: Hugill (11)
- Highest home attendance: 22,185 (vs Arsenal, 7 Jan 2017)
- Lowest home attendance: 4,509 (vs Hartlepool United, 9 Aug 16)
- Average home league attendance: 12,606
Home colours	Away colours	Third colours

The 2016–17 season was Preston North End's second consecutive season in the Championship in their 137th year in existence. Along with competing in the Championship, the club will also participate in the FA Cup and League Cup. The season covers the period from 1 July 2016 to 30 June 2017.

== Squad ==
No.	Name	Pos.	Nationality	Place of birth	Age	Apps	Goals	Signed from	Date signed	Fee	End
Goalkeepers
1	Anders Lindegaard	GK	(Denmark)	Dyrup	42	24	0	West Bromwich Albion	2 July 2016	Free	2017
22	Chris Maxwell	GK	(Wales)	St Asaph	36	40	0	Fleetwood Town	1 July 2016	Free	2020
40	Mathew Hudson	GK	(England)	Southport	28	1	0	Academy	1 July 2015	Free	2018
Defenders
2	Marnick Vermijl	RB	(Belgium)	Peer	34	51	4	Sheffield Wednesday	31 August 2016	Undisclosed	2019
3	Greg Cunningham	LB	(Republic of Ireland)	Galway	35	90	3	Bristol City	27 July 2015	Undisclosed	2019
5	Tom Clarke	CB	(England)	Sowerby Bridge	38	194	12	Huddersfield Town	22 May 2013	Free	2019
6	Tyias Browning	CB	(England)	Liverpool	32	8	0	Manchester United	30 January 2017	Loan	2017
15	Calum Woods	RB	(England)	Liverpool	39	61	0	Huddersfield Town	1 July 2014	Free	2018
17	Tommy Spurr	LB	(England)	Leeds	39	19	1	Blackburn Rovers	1 July 2016	Free	2019
23	Paul Huntington	CB	(England)	Carlisle	39	200	16	Yeovil Town	22 May 2012	Free	2018
24	Andy Boyle	CB	(Republic of Ireland)	Dublin	35	7	0	Dundalk	1 January 2017	Free	2019
27	Alex Baptiste	CB	(England)	Sutton-in-Ashfield	40	24	3	Middlesbrough	31 August 2016	Loan	2017
Midfielders
4	Ben Pearson	CM	(England)	Oldham	31	49	1	Manchester United	11 January 2016	£100,000	2020
7	Daryl Horgan	RM	(Republic of Ireland)	Galway	34	21	2	Dundalk	1 January 2017	Free	2019
8	Alan Browne	CM	(Republic of Ireland)	Cork	31	116	7	Free agent	1 January 2014	Free	2018
11	Daniel Johnson	AM	(Jamaica)	Kingston	34	111	21	Aston Villa	23 January 2015	£50,000	2019
12	Paul Gallagher	AM/WG	(Scotland)	Glasgow	42	189	30	Leicester City	16 June 2015	Free	2019
14	Aiden McGeady	WG	(Republic of Ireland)	Glasgow	40	35	8	Everton	31 August 2016	Loan	2017
16	Liam Grimshaw	MF/RB	(England)	Burnley	31	7	0	Manchester United	18 January 2016	Undisclosed	2018
18	Ben Pringle	CM/LM	(England)	Newcastle upon Tyne	37	14	0	Fulham	4 July 2016	Undisclosed	2019
19	John Welsh	CM	(England)	Liverpool	41	165	3	Tranmere Rovers	14 May 2012	Free	2018
Forwards
9	Simon Makienok	CF	(Denmark)	Næstved	35	29	6	Palermo	1 July 2016	Loan	2017
10	Jermaine Beckford	CF	(England)	London	42	60	21	Bolton Wanderers	9 June 2015	Free	2017
21	Stevie May	CF	(Scotland)	Perth	34	13	1	Sheffield Wednesday	1 September 2015	Undisclosed	2018
25	Jordan Hugill	CF	(England)	Middlesbrough	34	85	20	Port Vale	19 June 2014	Undisclosed	2018
29	Tom Barkhuizen	RW	(England)	Blackpool	33	17	6	Morecambe	1 January 2017	Free	2019
37	Callum Robinson	WG/CF	(England)	Northampton	31	78	15	Aston Villa	4 July 2016	Free	2019
Out on Loan
13	Eoin Doyle	CF	(Republic of Ireland)	Dublin	38	44	7	Cardiff City	1 July 2016	Undisclosed	2019
20	Ben Davies	LB	(England)	Barrow-in-Furness	31	12	0	Academy	25 January 2013	Free	2019
30	Clive Smith	DF	(England)		28	0	0	Academy	1 January 2016	Trainee	2017

=== Statistics ===
As of 7 May 2017

No.	Pos	Nat	Player	Total		Championship		FA Cup		League Cup	
No.	Pos	Nat	Player	Apps	Goals	Apps	Goals	Apps	Goals	Apps	Goals
1	GK	(Denmark) DEN	Anders Lindegaard	10	0	8+0	0	0+0	0	2+0	0
2	DF	(Belgium) BEL	Marnick Vermijl	19	2	13+5	2	1+0	0	0+0	0
3	DF	(Republic of Ireland) IRL	Greg Cunningham	44	0	40+0	0	1+0	0	3+0	0
4	MF	(England) ENG	Ben Pearson	33	1	28+2	1	1+0	0	2+0	0
5	DF	(England) ENG	Tom Clarke	46	4	42+0	4	1+0	0	1+2	0
6	DF	(England) ENG	Tyias Browning	8	0	8+0	0	0+0	0	0+0	0
7	MF	(Republic of Ireland) IRL	Daryl Horgan	21	2	10+10	2	0+1	0	0+0	0
8	MF	(Republic of Ireland) IRL	Alan Browne	36	0	22+10	0	0+1	0	2+1	0
9	FW	(Denmark) DEN	Simon Makienok (on loan from Palermo)	29	6	8+17	3	0+1	0	3+0	3
10	FW	(Jamaica) JAM	Jermaine Beckford	18	2	4+14	2	0+0	0	0+0	0
11	MF	(Jamaica) JAM	Daniel Johnson	44	4	31+9	4	1+0	0	2+1	0
12	MF	(Scotland) SCO	Paul Gallagher	34	1	28+3	1	1+0	0	1+1	0
14	MF	(Republic of Ireland) IRL	Aiden McGeady (on loan from Everton)	35	8	32+2	8	1+0	0	0+0	0
16	MF	(England) ENG	Liam Grimshaw	7	0	3+2	0	0+0	0	2+0	0
17	DF	(England) ENG	Tommy Spurr	19	1	11+6	1	0+0	0	2+0	0
18	MF	(England) ENG	Ben Pringle	14	0	7+3	0	0+0	0	4+0	0
19	MF	(England) ENG	John Welsh	7	0	5+0	0	0+0	0	2+0	0
21	FW	(Scotland) SCO	Stevie May	4	1	2+2	1	0+0	0	0+0	0
22	GK	(Wales) WAL	Chris Maxwell	40	0	37+0	0	1+0	0	2+0	0
23	DF	(England) ENG	Paul Huntington	38	1	26+7	1	1+0	0	4+0	0
24	DF	(Republic of Ireland) IRL	Andy Boyle	7	0	7+0	0	0+0	0	0+0	0
25	FW	(England) ENG	Jordan Hugill	47	13	35+9	12	1+0	0	1+1	1
27	DF	(England) ENG	Alex Baptiste (on loan from Middlesbrough)	24	3	23+1	3	0+0	0	0+0	0
29	FW	(England) ENG	Tom Barkhuizen	17	6	12+5	6	0+0	0	0+0	0
37	FW	(England) ENG	Callum Robinson	45	11	33+8	10	1+0	1	0+3	0
Out on Loan:
13	FW	(Republic of Ireland) IRL	Eoin Doyle	15	3	6+5	1	0+0	0	2+2	2
20	DF	(England) ENG	Ben Davies (at Fleetwood Town)	2	0	0+0	0	0+0	0	2+0	0
Player who left during the season:
6	DF	(Australia) AUS	Bailey Wright	21	0	18+0	0	0+0	0	3+0	0
7	MF	(Jamaica) JAM	Chris Humphrey	14	0	4+6	0	0+0	0	3+1	0
14	FW	(England) ENG	Joe Garner	3	0	2+0	0	0+0	0	1+0	0

==== Goals record ====
As of 7 May 2017

Rank	No.	Nat.	Po.	Name	Championship	FA Cup	League Cup	Total
1	25	(England)	CF	Jordan Hugill	12	0	1	13
2	37	(England)	WG	Callum Robinson	10	1	0	11
3	14	(Republic of Ireland)	RW	Aiden McGeady	8	0	0	8
4	9	(Denmark)	CF	Simon Makienok	3	0	3	6
4	29	(England)	RW	Tom Barkhuizen	6	0	0	6
6	11	(Jamaica)	AM	Daniel Johnson	5	0	0	5
7	5	(England)	CB	Tom Clarke	4	0	0	4
8	13	(Republic of Ireland)	CF	Eoin Doyle	1	0	2	3
8	27	(England)	CB	Alex Baptiste	3	0	0	3
10	2	(Belgium)	RB	Marnick Vermijl	2	0	0	2
10	7	(Republic of Ireland)	RW	Daryl Horgan	2	0	0	2
10	10	(Jamaica)	CF	Jermaine Beckford	2	0	0	2
12	4	(England)	CM	Ben Pearson	1	0	0	1
12	12	(Scotland)	AM	Paul Gallagher	1	0	0	1
12	17	(England)	LB	Tommy Spurr	1	0	0	1
12	21	(Scotland)	CF	Stevie May	1	0	0	1
12	23	(England)	CB	Paul Huntington	1	0	0	1
Own Goals					2	0	0	2
Total					64	1	6	71

==== Disciplinary record ====
As of 7 May 2017

Rank	No.	Nat.	Po.	Name	Championship			FA Cup			League Cup			Total		
Rank	No.	Nat.	Po.	Name	Yellow card	(yellow card) (yellow-red card)	Red card	Yellow card	(yellow card) (yellow-red card)	Red card	Yellow card	(yellow card) (yellow-red card)	Red card	Yellow card	(yellow card) (yellow-red card)	Red card
1	4	(England)	CM	Ben Pearson	14	0	0	1	0	0	1	0	0	16	0	0
2	3	(Republic of Ireland)	LB	Greg Cunningham	12	0	0	1	0	0	0	0	0	13	0	0
3	25	(England)	CF	Jordan Hugill	7	0	0	1	0	0	0	0	0	8	0	0
4	8	(Republic of Ireland)	CM	Alan Browne	6	0	0	0	0	0	0	0	1	6	0	1
4	14	(Republic of Ireland)	RW	Aiden McGeady	7	0	0	0	0	0	0	0	0	7	0	0
6	23	(England)	CB	Paul Huntington	4	0	0	0	0	0	1	0	0	5	0	0
7	11	(Jamaica)	AM	Daniel Johnson	4	0	0	0	0	0	0	0	0	4	0	0
7	37	(England)	WG	Callum Robinson	4	0	0	0	0	0	0	0	0	4	0	0
9	2	(Belgium)	RB	Marnick Vermijl	3	0	0	0	0	0	0	0	0	3	0	0
9	5	(England)	CB	Tom Clarke	3	0	0	0	0	0	0	0	0	3	0	0
9	~~6~~	(Australia)	CB	Bailey Wright	1	0	0	0	0	0	2	0	0	3	0	0
9	22	(Wales)	GK	Chris Maxwell	3	0	0	0	0	0	0	0	0	3	0	0
9	27	(England)	CB	Alex Baptiste	2	0	1	0	0	0	0	0	0	2	0	1
14	6	(England)	CB	Tyias Browning	2	0	0	0	0	0	0	0	0	2	0	0
14	10	(Jamaica)	CF	Jermaine Beckford	0	0	2	0	0	0	0	0	0	0	0	2
14	12	(Scotland)	AM	Paul Gallagher	1	0	1	0	0	0	0	0	0	1	0	1
14	17	(England)	LB	Tommy Spurr	2	0	0	0	0	0	0	0	0	2	0	0
14	18	(England)	CM	Ben Pringle	1	0	0	0	0	0	1	0	0	2	0	0
14	19	(England)	CM	John Welsh	2	0	0	0	0	0	0	0	0	2	0	0
14	24	(Republic of Ireland)	CB	Andy Boyle	2	0	0	0	0	0	0	0	0	2	0	0
20	7	(Jamaica)	RW	Chris Humphrey	1	0	0	0	0	0	0	0	0	1	0	0
20	13	(Republic of Ireland)	CF	Eoin Doyle	0	0	1	0	0	0	0	0	0	0	0	1
20	20	(England)	LB	Ben Davies	0	0	0	0	0	0	1	0	0	1	0	0
Total					81	0	5	3	0	0	6	0	1	90	0	6

=== Contracts ===
Date	Position	Nationality	Name	Contract Length	Status	Expires	Ref.
1 July 2016	CM	(England)	Josh Brownhill	2 years	Rejected	2018	
25 August 2016	CB	(England)	Paul Huntington	2 years	Extended	2019	
25 August 2016	AM	(Jamaica)	Daniel Johnson	3 years	Signed	2019	
6 September 2016	CB	(England)	Tom Clarke	3 years	Signed	2019	
8 September 2016	LB	(Republic of Ireland)	Greg Cunningham	3 years	Signed	2019	
14 September 2016	AM	(Scotland)	Paul Gallagher	3 years	Signed	2019	
14 September 2016	CF	(England)	Jordan Hugill	2 years	Signed	2018	
18 October 2016	CM	(England)	John Welsh	1 Year	Signed	2018	
10 November 2016	CB	(England)	Ben Davies	3 years	Signed	2019	
29 December 2016	CM	(England)	Ben Pearson	3 1/2 years	Signed	2020	
2 March 2017	GK	(Wales)	Chris Maxwell	1 year	Extended	2020	
9 May 2017	GK	(England)	Matthew Hudson	18 Months	Extended	2018	

== Transfers ==
=== Transfers in ===
Date from	Position	Nationality	Name	From	Fee	Ref.
1 July 2016	CF	(Republic of Ireland)	Eoin Doyle	Cardiff City	Undisclosed	
1 July 2016	GK	(Wales)	Chris Maxwell	Fleetwood Town	Free transfer	
1 July 2016	LB	(England)	Tommy Spurr	Blackburn Rovers	Free transfer	
2 July 2016	GK	(Denmark)	Anders Lindegaard	West Bromwich Albion	Free transfer	
4 July 2016	CM	(England)	Ben Pringle	Fulham	Undisclosed	
4 July 2016	LW	(England)	Callum Robinson	Aston Villa	Free transfer	
31 August 2016	RB	(Belgium)	Marnick Vermijl	Sheffield Wednesday	Undisclosed	
1 January 2017	RW	(England)	Tom Barkhuizen	Morecambe	Free transfer	
1 January 2017	CB	(Republic of Ireland)	Andy Boyle	Dundalk	Free transfer	
1 January 2017	RM	(Republic of Ireland)	Daryl Horgan	Dundalk	Free transfer	

=== Transfers out ===
Date from	Position	Nationality	Name	To	Fee	Ref.
1 July 2016	LB	(England)	Nick Anderton	Barrow (Note: Following Anderton's release, he signed for Barrow.)	Released	
1 July 2016	CM	(England)	Josh Brownhill	Bristol City	Compensation	
1 July 2016	CB	(England)	Josh Heaton	Droylsen (Note: Following Heaton's release, he signed for Droylsden.)	Released	
1 July 2016	GK	(England)	Jamie Jones	Stevenage	Free transfer	
1 July 2016	CM	(Australia)	Neil Kilkenny	Melbourne City (Note: Following Kilkenny's release, he signed for Melbourne City.)	Released	
1 July 2016	GK	(England)	Chris Kirkland	Bury (Note: Following Kirkland's release, he signed for Bury.)	Released	
1 July 2016	CF	(Northern Ireland)	Andy Little	Free agent	Released	
1 July 2016	LM	(England)	Kyel Reid	Coventry City (Note: Following Reid's release, he signed for Coventry City.)	Released	
1 July 2016	CF	(England)	Jack Ryan	Bradford Park Avenue (Note: Following Ryan's release, he signed for Bradford Park Avenue.)	Released	
19 August 2016	CF	(England)	Joe Garner	Rangers	£1,800,000	
30 December 2016	RM	(Jamaica)	Chris Humphrey	Hibernian (Note: Following Humphrey's departure, he signed for Hibernian.)	Mutual consent	
6 January 2017	CB	(Australia)	Bailey Wright	Bristol City	Undisclosed	

- income ▲ –£1,800,000

=== Loans in ===
Date from	Position	Nationality	Name	From	Date until	Ref.
1 July 2016	CF	(Denmark)	Simon Makienok	Palermo	End of Season	
31 August 2016	CB	(England)	Alex Baptiste	Middlesbrough	End of Season	
31 August 2016	RW	(Republic of Ireland)	Aiden McGeady	Everton	End of Season	
30 January 2017	RB	(England)	Tyias Browning	Everton	End of Season	

=== Loans out ===
Date from	Position	Nationality	Name	To	Date until	Ref.
2 January 2017	LB	(England)	Ben Davies	Fleetwood Town	End of season	
31 January 2017	CF	(Republic of Ireland)	Eoin Doyle	Portsmouth	End of season	
31 January 2017	DM	(England)	Liam Grimshaw	Chesterfield	End of season	
31 January 2017	RB	(Wales)	Clive Smith	St Johnstone	End of season	
24 March 2017	LB	(England)	Josh Earl	Lancaster City	End of season	

== Competitions ==
=== Pre-season ===
8 July 2016	Bamber Bridge	1–2	Preston North End	Bamber Bridge, Lancashire
19:00 BST	Churchman 86'		Vasey 30' (o.g.); Doyle 77'	Stadium: Sir Tom Finney Stadium; Attendance: 1,836; Referee: N. Salisbury

9 July 2016	Chorley	1–2	Preston North End	Chorley, Lancashire
15:00 BST	O'Keefe 1' (pen.)	Report	Garner 56'; Hugill 64'	Stadium: Victory Park; Attendance: 1,739; Referee: Michael Salisbury

16 July 2016	Accrington Stanley	v	Preston North End	Accrington, Lancashire
15:00 BST				Stadium: Wham Stadium

19 July 2016	Oldham Athletic	1–3	Preston North End	Oldham, Greater Manchester
19:00 BST	Trialist 71'	Report	Doyle 20'; Garner 70', 74' (pen.)	Stadium: Boundary Park; Attendance: 908; Referee: Oliver Langford

23 July 2016	Preston North End	1–1	Stoke City	Preston, Lancashire
15:00 BST	Johnson 8'	Report	Diouf 54'	Stadium: Deepdale; Attendance: 4,493; Referee: Jeremy Simpson

26 July 2016	Morecambe	1–4	Preston North End	Morecambe, Lancashire
19:30 BST	Barkhuizen 78'	Report	Robinson 23', 81'; Pringle 39'; Hugill 71'	Stadium: Globe Arena; Attendance: 1,252 (554 away fans); Referee: Darren Handley

30 July 2016	Bolton Wanderers	0–0	Preston North End	Bolton, Greater Manchester
15:00 BST		Report		Stadium: Macron Stadium; Attendance: 3,669 (800 away fans); Referee: Andrew Madley

=== Championship ===
==== League table ====
Pos	Team	Pld	W	D	L	GF	GA	GD	Pts
9	Derby County	46	18	13	15	54	50	+4	67
10	Brentford	46	18	10	18	75	65	+10	64
11	Preston North End	46	16	14	16	64	63	+1	62
12	Cardiff City	46	17	11	18	60	61	−1	62
13	Aston Villa	46	16	14	16	47	48	−1	62

Source: English Football League, Soccerway
Rules for classification: 1) Points; 2) Goal difference; 3) Number of goals scored; 4) Points in head-to-head matches; 5) Goal difference in head-to-head matches; 6) Goals scored in head-to-head matches; 7) Play-off.

==== Matches ====
6 August 2016 1	Reading	1–0	Preston North End	Reading
15:00 BST	Swift 35'; McShane (yellow card) 36'; Evans (yellow card) 50'	PNE Report	(yellow card) 50' Cunningham; (yellow card) 59' Gallagher; (yellow card) 90+5' Browne	Stadium: Madejski Stadium; Attendance: 15,764 (1,000 PNE fans); Referee: Andy Davies

13 August 2016 2	Preston North End	1–2	Fulham	Preston
15:00 BST	Robinson 71'	BBC Report	33' Aluko; (yellow card) 43' Ayité; 67' Smith; (yellow card) 78' Cairney	Stadium: Deepdale; Attendance: 10,809; Referee: James Adcock

16 August 2016 3	Preston North End	0–1	Derby County	Preston
19:45 BST	Pringle (yellow card) 86'	BBC Report	87' Forsyth	Stadium: Deepdale; Attendance: 10,628; Referee: David Coote

20 August 2016 4	Queens Park Rangers	0–2	Preston North End	London
15:00 BST	Perch (yellow card) 45+1'	BBC Report	21' Beckford; 52' (o.g.) Onuoha; (yellow card) 58' Welsh; (yellow card) 85' Browne	Stadium: Loftus Road; Attendance: 13,307; Referee: Andy Madley

27 August 2016 5	Ipswich Town	1–0	Preston North End	Ipswich
15:00 BST	Ward 15'; Skuse (yellow card) 45'	BBC Report	(yellow card) 38' Spurr	Stadium: Portman Road; Attendance: 15,296; Referee: Tim Robinson

10 September 2016 6	Preston North End	1–2	Barnsley	Preston
15:00 BST	Spurr (yellow card) 39'; Cunningham (yellow card) 47'; McGeady 64'; Hugill (yellow card) 81'	BBC Report	27' Winnall; (yellow card) 50' Roberts; 79' Armstrong; (yellow card) 88' Yiadom; (yellow card) 90+1' Davies	Stadium: Deepdale; Attendance: 11,852; Referee: Geoff Eltringham

13 September 2016 7	Preston North End	3–0	Cardiff City	Preston
19:45 BST	Clarke 36'; Robinson 41' (yellow card) 79'; Hugill 88'	PNE Report	Wilson (yellow card) 26'; Lambert (yellow card) 55'; Noone (yellow card) 62'; Pilkington (yellow card) 68'	Stadium: Deepdale; Attendance: 9,216 (215 Cardiff City fans); Referee: Stephen Martin

13 September 2016 8	Brentford	5–0	Preston North End	London
19:45 BST	Hogan 34', 84', 87'; Dean 74'; Humphrey 85' (o.g.)	BBC Report	(yellow card) 64' Cunningham; (yellow card) 81' Humphrey	Stadium: Griffin Park; Referee: Keith Stroud

23 September 2016 9	Preston North End	1–0	Wigan Athletic	Preston
19:45 BST	Hugill 7'; Cunningham (yellow card) 30'; Browne (yellow card) 75'	BBC Report	(yellow card) 45+1' Burn; (yellow card) 67' Perkins	Stadium: Deepdale; Attendance: 13,077; Referee: Oliver Langford

27 September 2016 10	Birmingham City	2–2	Preston North End	Birmingham
19:45 BST	Shotton 30'; Che Adams 68'; Maghoma (yellow card) 80'	Report	19' Baptiste; 35' Johnson; (yellow card) 43' Pearson	Stadium: St Andrew's; Attendance: 15,779; Referee: Andy Woolmer

1 October 2016 11	Preston North End	2–0	Aston Villa	Preston
15:00 BST	Pearson 5', (yellow card) 44'; Hugill 39'; Cunningham (yellow card) 61'; Welsh (yellow card) 87'; Wright (yellow card) 90+5'	BBC Report	(yellow card) 42' Hutton; (yellow card) 44' Westwood; (yellow card) 45+3' Jedinak; (yellow card) 85' Amavi	Stadium: Deepdale; Attendance: 17,696; Referee: Peter Bankes

15 October 2016 12	Brighton & Hove Albion	2–2	Preston North End	Brighton
15:00 BST	Baldock 54'; Murray 65'	BBC Report	10', (yellow card) 75' Hugill; (yellow card) 82' Pearson; 90+2' Makienok	Stadium: AMEX Stadium; Attendance: 27,606; Referee: Craig Pawson

19 October 2016 13	Preston North End	3–1	Huddersfield Town	Preston
19:45 BST	Clarke 6'; Baptiste 42'; Gallagher 53'; Hugill (yellow card) 82'	Report	Hudson (yellow card) 53'; Wells 81'	Stadium: Deepdale Stadium; Attendance: 12,862; Referee: Jeremy Simpson

22 October 2016 14	Norwich City	0–1	Preston North End	Norwich
15:00 BST	Klose (yellow card) 57'	Report	(yellow card) 68' Cunningham; 75' Baptiste	Stadium: Carrow Road; Attendance: 26,239; Referee: Steve Martin

29 October 2016 15	Preston North End	1–2	Newcastle United	Preston
15:00 BST	Robinson (yellow card) 61'; Pearson (yellow card) 64'; Johnson (yellow card) 64'; Beckford 90'	Report	59', 71', (yellow card) 84' Mitrović; (yellow card) 76' Hayden; (yellow card) 89' Ritchie; (yellow card) 90+7' Darlow	Stadium: Deepdale; Attendance: 20,724; Referee: Chris Kavanagh

5 November 2016 16	Rotherham United	1–3	Preston North End	Rotherham
15:00 GMT	Wood 71'	Report	Hugill 22'; Robinson 27'; Johnson (yellow card) 55'; Vermijl 81'	Stadium: AESSEAL New York Stadium; Attendance: 10,013; Referee: Andy Woolmer

19 November 2016 17	Preston North End	0–0	Wolverhampton Wanderers	Preston
15:00 GMT	Hugill (yellow card) 42'; Pearson (yellow card) 63'; Cunningham (yellow card) 63'; Maxwell (yellow card) 66'	Report	(yellow card) 45+1' Price; (yellow card) 64' Hause; (yellow card) 70' Wallace; (yellow card) 71' Batth	Stadium: Deepdale; Attendance: 12,683; Referee: James Lingington

26 November 2016 18	Preston North End	1–1	Burton Albion	Preston
15:00 GMT	Johnson (yellow card) 37'; Robinson 45+2'; Cunningham (yellow card) 85'; Pearson (yellow card) 90'	Report	Irvine 23'; Mousinho (yellow card) 77'; O'Grady (yellow card) 79'	Stadium: Deepdale Stadium; Attendance: 10,696; Referee: Darren Bond

3 December 2016 19	Sheffield Wednesday	2–1	Preston North End	Sheffield
15:00 GMT	Forestieri 9' (red card) 65'; Lee (yellow card) 58'; Fletcher 79' (pen.)	Report	Doyle 82' (red card) 90'; Beckford (red card) 90'	Stadium: Hillsborough Stadium; Attendance: 24,843; Referee: Scott Duncan

10 December 2016 20	Preston North End	3–2	Blackburn Rovers	Preston
17:30 GMT	Johnson 18', 31' (pen.); Clarke (yellow card) 52'; Robinson 80'	Report	Graham (penalty missed) 22' 22', 70'; Lenihan (yellow card) 30'; Marshall (yellow card) 60'	Stadium: Deepdale Stadium; Attendance: 14,527; Referee: Kevin Friend

14 December 2016 21	Nottingham Forest	1–1	Preston North End	Nottingham
19:45 GMT	Lam (yellow card) 54'; Maxwell 68' (o.g.); Vaughan (yellow card) 77'	Report	Makienok 45'; Browne (yellow card) 53'; Baptiste (yellow card) 90'	Stadium: The City Ground; Attendance: 15,864; Referee: Tony Harrington

17 December 2016 22	Bristol City	1–2	Preston North End	Bristol
15:00 GMT	Wilbraham 78'	Report	21' Makienok; (yellow card) 45+4' McGeady; 85', (yellow card) 90+1' Johnson; (yellow card) 90' Pearson	Stadium: Ashton Gate Stadium; Attendance: 18,619; Referee: Simon Hooper

26 December 2016 23	Preston North End	1–4	Leeds United	Preston
15:00 GMT	Vermijl 27'; Beckford (red card) 69'; Clarke (yellow card) 72'; Baptiste (yellow card) 86'	Report	Roofe 17'; Sacko 23'; Doukara 31'; Phillips (yellow card) 43'; Bartley (yellow card) 50'; Ayling (yellow card) 61'; Hernández 88'	Stadium: Deepdale Stadium; Attendance: 21,255; Referee: Jeremy Simpson

31 December 2016 24	Preston North End	1–1	Sheffield Wednesday	Preston
15:00 GMT	Pearson (yellow card) 75'; Hutchinson 77' (o.g.)	Report	Fletcher (yellow card) 73'; Reach 90+4'	Stadium: Deepdale Stadium; Attendance: 14,802; Referee: Andy Woolmer

2 January 2017 25	Burton Albion	0–1	Preston North End	Burton upon Trent
15:00 GMT	O'Grady (yellow card) 33'	Report	45+1' Clarke	Stadium: Pirelli Stadium; Attendance: 5,144; Referee: Oliver Langford

14 January 2017 26	Preston North End	2–0	Brighton & Hove Albion	Preston
15:00 GMT	Bruno (yellow card) 63'; Duffy (yellow card) 73'	Report	13' Huntington; 53' Robinson; (yellow card) 68' Cunningham; (yellow card) 90+4' Hugill	Stadium: Deepdale; Attendance: 11,391; Referee: Simon Hooper

21 January 2017 27	Aston Villa	2–2	Preston North End	Birmingham
15:00 GMT	Adomah 22', 36', (yellow card) 41'; Amavi (yellow card) 67'	Report	(yellow card) 18' Browne; (yellow card) 63', (goal) 64', 76' Hugill; (yellow card) 68' Vermijl; (yellow card) 90+5' McGeady	Stadium: Villa Park; Attendance: 32,415; Referee: Andrew Madley

28 January 2017 28	Preston North End	1–1	Ipswich Town	Preston
15:00 GMT	Vermijl (yellow card) 14'; Hugill 89'; McGeady (yellow card) 90+2'	Report	Lawrence 16'	Stadium: Deepdale Stadium; Attendance: 10,656; Referee: Steve Martin

31 January 2017 29	Cardiff City	2–0	Preston North End	Cardiff
19:45 GMT	Whittingham 18' (pen.); Zohore 28'; Harris (yellow card) 64'	Report	McGeady (yellow card) 72'	Stadium: Cardiff City Stadium; Attendance: 13,894; Referee: Graham Scott

4 February 2017 30	Barnsley	0–0	Preston North End	Barnsley
15:00 GMT	Scowen (yellow card) 58'	Report	McGeady (yellow card) 64'; Pearson (yellow card) 79'; Browne (yellow card) 88'; Cunningham (yellow card) 90+3'	Stadium: Oakwell; Attendance: 12,590; Referee: Oliver Langford

11 February 2017 31	Preston North End	4–2	Brentford	Preston
15:00 GMT	McGeady 18', 75'; Robinson 52'; Horgan 77'	Report	Field 12'; Colin (yellow card) 29', (goal) 89'; McEachran (yellow card) 57'	Stadium: Deepdale Stadium; Attendance: 10,130; Referee: Tony Harrington

14 February 2017 32	Preston North End	2–1	Birmingham City	Preston
19:45 GMT	Robinson 8', (yellow card) 52'; Pearson (yellow card) 45+3'Hugill 78'	Report	(yellow card) 40' Kieftenbeld; (yellow card) 45+3' Frei; 47', (yellow card) 58' Adams; (yellow card) 56' (yellow-red card) 80' Gardner	Stadium: Deepdale; Attendance: 10,233; Referee: Tim Robinson

18 February 2017 33	Wigan Athletic	0–0	Preston North End	Wigan
15:00 GMT		Report	(yellow card) 36' McGeady; (yellow card) 43' Browning	Stadium: DW Stadium; Attendance: 15,117; Referee: Chris Kavanagh

25 February 2017 34	Preston North End	2–1	Queen's Park Rangers	Preston
15:00 GMT	McGeady 45'; Clarke (yellow card) 66'; Hugill 71'	Report	(yellow card) 21' Onuoha; 36' (yellow card) 62' LuaLua; (yellow card) 41' (yellow-red card) 78' Freeman	Stadium: Deepdale; Attendance: 10,848; Referee: David Coote

4 March 2017 35	Fulham	3–1	Preston North End	Fulham, London
15:00 GMT	Aluko 22'; Martin 60'; Kebano 77'	Report	Barkhuizen 68'; Pearson (yellow card) 80'; Cunningham (yellow card) 90+3'	Stadium: Craven Cottage; Attendance: 20,205; Referee: Simon Hooper

7 March 2017 36	Derby County	1–1	Preston North End	Derby
19:45 GMT	Vydra 50'; Johnson (yellow card) 81'	Report	McGeady (yellow card) 54'; Barkhuizen 90+4'	Stadium: iPro Stadium; Attendance: 26,301; Referee: James Linington

11 March 2017 37	Preston North End	3–0	Reading	Preston
15:00 GMT	Boyle (yellow card) 29'; Barkuizhen 31', 49'; Horgan 40'	Report	(yellow card) 90+1' Gunter	Stadium: Deepdale; Attendance: 10,787; Referee: Scott Duncan

18 March 2017 38	Blackburn Rovers	2–2	Preston North End	Blackburn
13:00 GMT	Bennett 43'; Conway 56'; Mahoney (yellow card) 77'	Report	13' Barkhuizen; (yellow card) 67' Cunningham; (yellow card) 87' Huntington; 90+3' McGeady	Stadium: Ewood Park; Attendance: 18,435; Referee: Stuart Attwell

1 April 2017 39	Preston North End	1–1	Nottingham Forest	Preston
15:00 BST	Boyle (yellow card) 37'; McGeady 52'; Robinson (yellow card) 55'; Pearson (yellow card) 90+4'	Report	22' Assombalonga; (yellow card) 34' Lichaj; (yellow card) 71' Pinillos; (yellow card) 90+2' Fox	Stadium: Deepdale; Attendance: 12,459; Referee: Darren Bond

4 April 2017 40	Preston North End	5–0	Bristol City	Preston
19:45 BST	Maxwell (yellow card) 4'; Barkhuizen 25'; McGeady 47' (pen.); Clarke 54'; Robinson 64', 68'; Huntington (yellow card) 90+1'	Report	Pack (yellow card) 34'; Tomlin (yellow card) 73'	Stadium: Deepdale; Attendance: 10,224; Referee: Andrew Madley

8 April 2017 41	Leeds United	3–0	Preston North End	Leeds
15:00 BST	Roofe 18'; Hernández 45'; Wood (yellow card) 78'; Doukara 90+3'	Report	Baptiste (red card) 86'	Stadium: Elland Road; Attendance: 31,851; Referee: Peter Bankes

14 April 2017 42	Huddersfield Town	3–2	Preston North End	Huddersfield
15:00 BST	Kachunga 43'; Löwe (yellow card) 58'; Payne 70'; Quaner 90+6'	Report	McGeady 23'; Pearson (yellow card) 58'; Vermijl (yellow card) 61'; Huntington (yellow card) 61'; Hugill 79' (yellow card) 90+3'; Maxwell (yellow card) 90+5'	Stadium: The John Smith's Stadium; Attendance: 21,254; Referee: Lee Probert

17 April 2017 43	Preston North End	1–3	Norwich City	Preston
15:00 BST	Spurr 67'	Report	Dorrans 28'; Murphy 40' (yellow card) 81'; Maddison 90+2'	Stadium: Deepdale; Attendance: 11,373; Referee: James Adcock

24 April 2017 44	Newcastle United	4–1	Preston North End	Newcastle upon Tyne
19:45 BST	Pérez 7', 67'; Atsu 45'; Shelvey (yellow card) 56'; Ritchie 65' (pen.) (yellow card) 82'	Report	Hugill 14'; Browning (yellow card) 27'; Gallagher (red card) 64'	Stadium: St James' Park; Attendance: 50,212; Referee: Andrew Madley

29 April 2017 45	Preston North End	1–1	Rotherham United	Preston
15:00 BST	May 41'	Report	Smallwood 9' (yellow card) 69'	Stadium: Deepdale; Attendance: 11,032; Referee: Robert Jones

7 May 2017 46	Wolverhampton Wanderers	1–0	Preston North End	Wolverhampton
12:00 BST	Batth 1'; Seiss (yellow card) 63'	Report	(yellow card) 76' Pearson; (yellow card) 86' Huntington	Stadium: Molineux Stadium; Attendance: 20,163; Referee: Darren England

=== FA Cup ===
7 January 2017 Round 3	Preston North End	1–2	Arsenal	Preston
15:00 GMT	Robinson 7'; Hugill (yellow card) 44'; Cunningham (yellow card) 65'; Pearson (yellow card) 75'	Report	46' Ramsey; (yellow card) 70' Gabriel; 89' Giroud	Stadium: Deepdale; Attendance: 22,185; Referee: Bobby Madley

=== EFL Cup ===
9 August 2016 First round	Preston North End	1–0	Hartlepool United	Preston
19:45 BST	Wright (yellow card) 18'; Huntington (yellow card) 90'; Doyle 90+4'	Report	(yellow card) 61' Woods; (yellow card) 81' Magnay	Stadium: Deepdale; Attendance: 4,509; Referee: Andy Woolmer

23 August 2016 Second Round	Preston North End	2–0	Oldham Athletic	Preston
19:45 BST	Doyle 66'; Hugill 81'	Report	(yellow card) 87' Erwin	Stadium: Deepdale; Attendance: 5,075; Referee: Scott Duncan

20 September 2016 Third Round	AFC Bournemouth	2–3 (a.e.t.)	Preston North End	Bournemouth
19:45 BST	Wilson (yellow card) 15'; Grabban 53' (pen.); Gosling 76'	Report	10', 85', 111' Makienok; (yellow card) 30' Davies; (yellow card) 58' Pringle; (yellow card) 109' Pearson	Stadium: Vitality Stadium; Attendance: 7,595; Referee: Simon Hooper

25 October 2016 Fourth Round	Newcastle United	6–0	Preston North End	Newcastle upon Tyne
19:45 BST	Mitrović 19', 55' (yellow card) 56'; Diamé 38', 87'; Ritchie 53' (pen.); Pérez 90+1'	Report	Doyle (yellow card) 19'; Browne (red card) 25'	Stadium: St James' Park; Attendance: 49,042; Referee: Andrew Madley

== Summary ==
Games played	51 (46 Championship, 1 FA Cup, 4 League Cup)
Games won	19 (16 Championship, 0 FA Cup, 3 League Cup)
Games drawn	14 (14 Championship, 0 FA Cup, 0 League Cup)
Games lost	18 (16 Championship, 1 FA Cup, 1 League Cup)
Goals scored	71 (64 Championship, 1 FA Cup, 6 League Cup)
Goals conceded	73 (63 Championship, 2 FA Cup, 8 League Cup)
Goal difference	-2
Clean sheets	14 (12 Championship, 0 FA Cup, 2 League Cup)
Yellow cards	88 (79 Championship, 3 FA Cup, 7 League Cup)
Red cards	6 (6 Championship, 0 FA Cup, 1 League Cup)
Worst Discipline	Ben Pearson (15 (yellow card) , 0 (yellow card) (yellow-red card) , 0 (red card) )
Best result	5–0 vs Bristol City (4 April 2017)
Worst result	0–6 vs Newcastle United (25 Oct 16)
Most appearances	Tom Clarke & Jordan Hugill (46)
Top scorer	Jordan Hugill (12)
Points	62
