= Callum Robinson =

Footballer (born 1995)

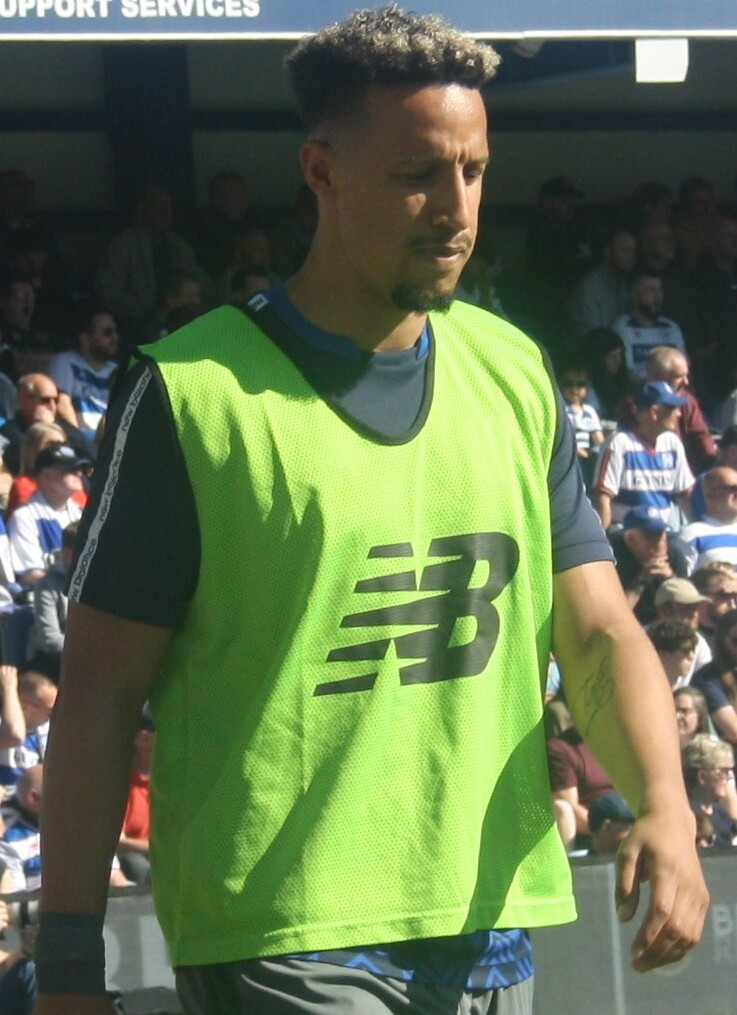
- Robinson in 2025

Personal information
- Full name: Callum Jack Robinson
- Date of birth: 2 February 1995 (age 31)
- Place of birth: Northampton, England
- Height: 5 ft 10 in (1.78 m)
- Position: Forward

Team information
- Current team: Cardiff City
- Number: 47

Youth career
- –2013: Aston Villa

Senior career*
Years	Team	Apps	(Gls)
2013–2016	Aston Villa	4	(0)
2014–2015	→ Preston North End (loan)	25	(4)
2015	→ Bristol City (loan)	6	(0)
2016	→ Preston North End (loan)	14	(2)
2016–2019	Preston North End	110	(29)
2019–2020	Sheffield United	17	(1)
2020	→ West Bromwich Albion (loan)	16	(3)
2020–2022	West Bromwich Albion	75	(12)
2022–	Cardiff City	125	(28)

International career^{‡}
2011	England U16	5	(1)
2011–2012	England U17	12	(2)
2013–2014	England U19	5	(3)
2014–2015	England U20	9	(3)
2018–	Republic of Ireland	38	(9)
- * Club domestic league appearances and goals as of 13 October 2026 (UTC) ‡ National team caps and goals as of 11 September 2024 (UTC)

Callum Jack Robinson (born 2 February 1995) is a professional footballer who plays as a forward for EFL Championship club Cardiff City and the Republic of Ireland national team.

Robinson is a product of the Aston Villa academy. He twice played for Preston on loan from Aston Villa before joining on a permanent deal in 2016. Robinson played internationally for England at all youth levels up to the under-20 side but declared for the Republic of Ireland in March 2018, for whom he is qualified by maternal descent.

== Club career ==
=== Aston Villa ===
Robinson is a product of the Aston Villa youth team. He made his Villa debut on 24 September 2013 in the League Cup third round in a 0–4 home defeat by Tottenham Hotspur, replacing Aleksandar Tonev for the final eight minutes. His Premier League debut came on 19 April 2014, replacing Andreas Weimann for the last five minutes of a goalless draw with Southampton at Villa Park, and he made three further substitute appearances that season.

==== Loan to Preston North End ====
Robinson was loaned to Preston North End of League One on a one-month deal on 16 September 2014 and made his debut that night as a substitute against a Chesterfield side featuring fellow Villa loanee Daniel Johnson. His first professional goal came on 28 October. He opened a 2–0 win at Leyton Orient by converting Chris Humphrey's cross. On 10 November Robinson scored a hat-trick against Havant & Waterlooville in a 3–0 away win in the first round of the FA Cup. Following a successful spell with Preston, during which he scored five goals in 11 league and cup appearances, Robinson was recalled by Aston Villa on 25 November, despite his loan having been extended until January 2015.

Robinson returned to Preston on loan for the rest of the 2014–15 season on transfer deadline day, 2 February 2015.

==== Loan to Bristol City ====
On 7 August 2015, Robinson joined Bristol City on loan for the 2015–16 season. He scored his first goal for the club in a 3–1 defeat to Luton Town in the League Cup four days later. His loan with City was cut short on 2 January 2016 after falling out of the first team, having made no appearances since October.

=== Return to Preston North End ===
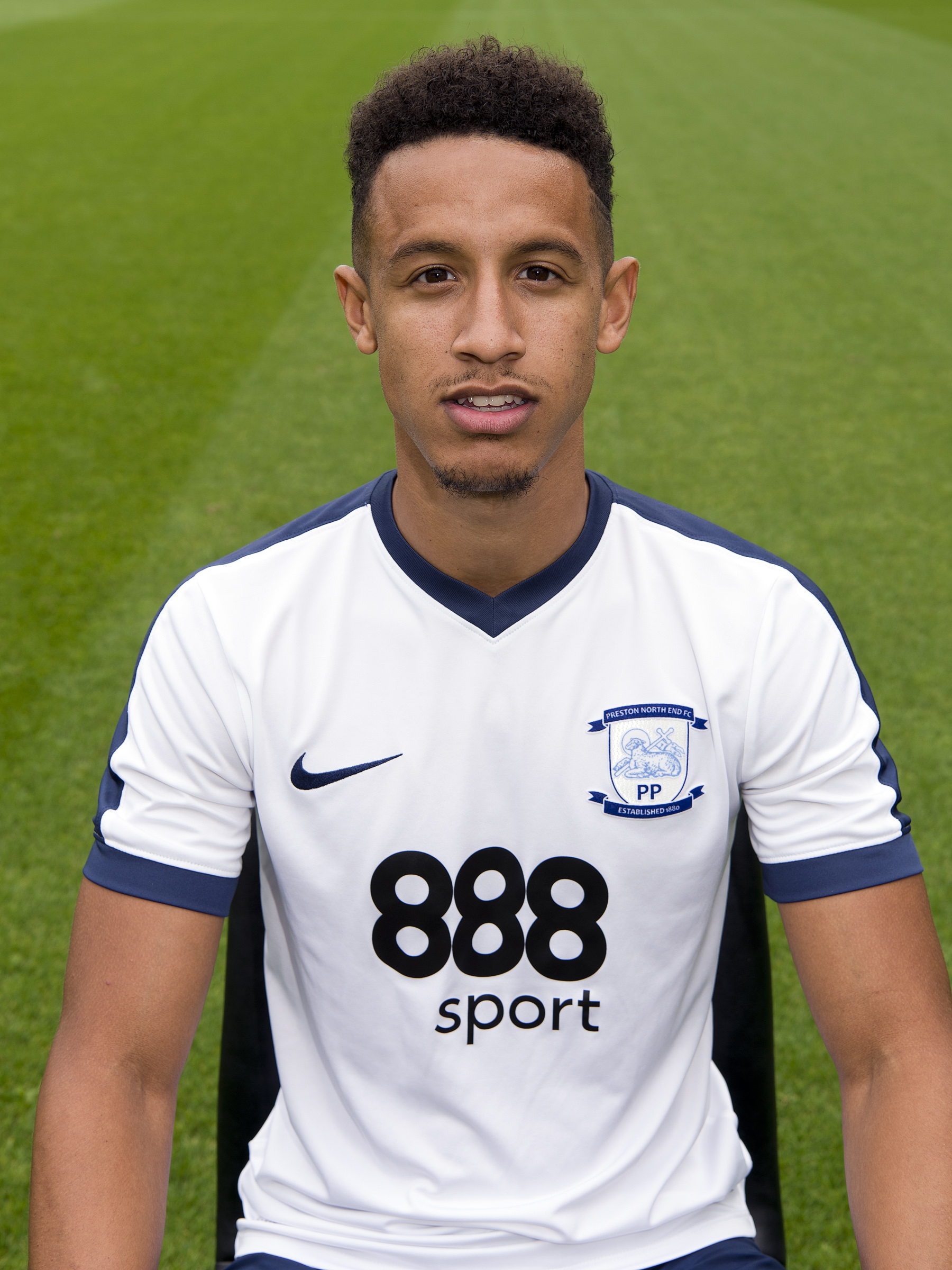
Robinson with Preston North End in 2016.

On 5 January 2016, Robinson re-signed for Preston until the end of the season, taking the number 37 shirt.

On 4 July 2016, Robinson joined Preston North End on a three-year deal after two successful loan spells.

=== Sheffield United ===
Robinson signed a four-year contract for Sheffield United on 12 July 2019 for an undisclosed fee.

=== West Bromwich Albion ===
On 29 January 2020, Robinson joined West Bromwich Albion on loan until the end of the 2019–20 season.

On 9 September 2020, Robinson joined West Brom on a five-year deal as part of a swap deal sending Oliver Burke to Sheffield United. On 3 April 2021, he scored a brace of goals in a 5–2 victory over Chelsea at Stamford Bridge. The first of these would go on to be awarded West Brom's Goal of the Season, along with being nominated for the Premier League Goal of the Month for April.

=== Cardiff City ===
On 1 September 2022, Robinson joined Cardiff City on a 3-year deal from West Bromwich Albion for £1.75mil.

== International career ==
Robinson was born in England, to a father of Jamaican descent and mother of Irish descent. He played for England at under-16 and under-17 levels. He made his England under-19 debut as a substitute against Hungary on 14 November 2013. He scored his first U19 goal in the 88th minute of the same match. He was also eligible to represent Ireland and declared for them in March 2018. He qualifies through his County Monaghan-born grandmother.

He made his Republic of Ireland debut on 6 September 2018 in a 4–1 defeat to Wales in the UEFA Nations League.

He scored his first goal for Ireland on 14 November 2019 in a 3–1 win against New Zealand.

On 9 October 2021, Robinson scored twice as Ireland won 3–0 away to Azerbaijan in a 2022 FIFA World Cup qualifier to secure Stephen Kenny his first competitive win as Ireland manager. He subsequently scored a hat-trick three days later in a friendly against Qatar. He became the first player to score a hat-trick for Ireland since Robbie Keane in 2014, and the first to score in two consecutive matches since Jon Walters in June 2017.

== Career statistics ==
=== Club ===
As of match played 28 February 2026

Appearances and goals by club, season and competition
Club	Season	League			FA Cup		League Cup		Other		Total	
Club	Season	Division	Apps	Goals	Apps	Goals	Apps	Goals	Apps	Goals	Apps	Goals
Aston Villa	2013–14	Premier League	4	0	0	0	1	0	–		5	0
Preston North End (loan)	2014–15	League One	25	4	2	3	0	0	1 (Note: Appearance in League One play-offs)	0	28	7
Bristol City (loan)	2015–16	Championship	6	0	0	0	1	1	–		7	1
Preston North End (loan)	2015–16	Championship	14	2	1	0	0	0	–		15	2
Preston North End	2016–17	Championship	42	10	1	1	3	0	–		46	11
Preston North End	2017–18	Championship	41	7	1	0	1	0	–		43	7
Preston North End	2018–19	Championship	27	12	0	0	1	1	–		28	13
Preston North End	Total		149	35	5	4	5	1	1	0	160	40
Sheffield United	2019–20	Premier League	17	1	2	1	1	0	–		20	2
West Bromwich Albion (loan)	2019–20	Championship	16	3	0	0	0	0	–		16	3
West Bromwich Albion	2020–21	Premier League	28	5	0	0	1	1	–		29	6
West Bromwich Albion	2021–22	Championship	43	7	1	1	0	0	–		44	8
West Bromwich Albion	2022–23	Championship	4	0	0	0	2	0	–		6	0
West Bromwich Albion	Total		91	15	1	1	3	1	0	0	95	17
Cardiff City	2022–23	Championship	22	5	1	2	0	0	–		23	7
Cardiff City	2023–24	Championship	23	1	1	0	1	1	–		25	2
Cardiff City	2024–25	Championship	34	12	1	0	0	0	–		35	12
Cardiff City	2025–26	League One	31	6	1	0	4	1	2 (Note: Appearance in EFL Trophy)	1	38	8
Cardiff City	2026–27	Championship	4	0	0	0	1	0	–		5	0
Cardiff City	Total		114	24	4	2	6	2	2	1	126	29
Career total			381	75	12	8	17	5	3	1	413	89

=== International ===
As of match played 10 September 2024

Appearances and goals by national team and year
National team	Year	Apps	Goals
Republic of Ireland	2018	6	0
Republic of Ireland	2019	6	1
Republic of Ireland	2020	3	0
Republic of Ireland	2021	9	6
Republic of Ireland	2022	10	1
Republic of Ireland	2023	3	1
Republic of Ireland	2024	1	0
Total		38	9

Scores and results list the Republic of Ireland's goal tally first, score column indicates score after each Robinson goal.

List of international goals scored by Callum Robinson
No.	Date	Venue	Opponent	Score	Result	Competition
1	14 November 2019	Aviva Stadium, Dublin, Ireland	New Zealand	3–1	3–1	Friendly
2	9 October 2021	Baku Olympic Stadium, Baku, Azerbaijan	Azerbaijan	1–0	3–0	2022 FIFA World Cup qualification
3	9 October 2021	Baku Olympic Stadium, Baku, Azerbaijan	Azerbaijan	2–0	3–0	2022 FIFA World Cup qualification
4	12 October 2021	Aviva Stadium, Dublin, Ireland	Qatar	1–0	4–0	Friendly
5	12 October 2021	Aviva Stadium, Dublin, Ireland	Qatar	2–0	4–0	Friendly
6	12 October 2021	Aviva Stadium, Dublin, Ireland	Qatar	3–0	4–0	Friendly
7	14 November 2021	Stade de Luxembourg, Luxembourg City, Luxembourg	Luxembourg	3–0	3–0	2022 FIFA World Cup qualification
8	20 November 2022	National Stadium, Ta' Qali, Malta	Malta	1–0	1–0	Friendly
9	16 October 2023	Estádio Algarve, Faro, Portugal	Gibraltar	4–0	4–0	UEFA Euro 2024 qualification

== See also ==
- List of Republic of Ireland international footballers born outside the Republic of Ireland
