= Marnick Vermijl =

Belgian footballer (born 1992)

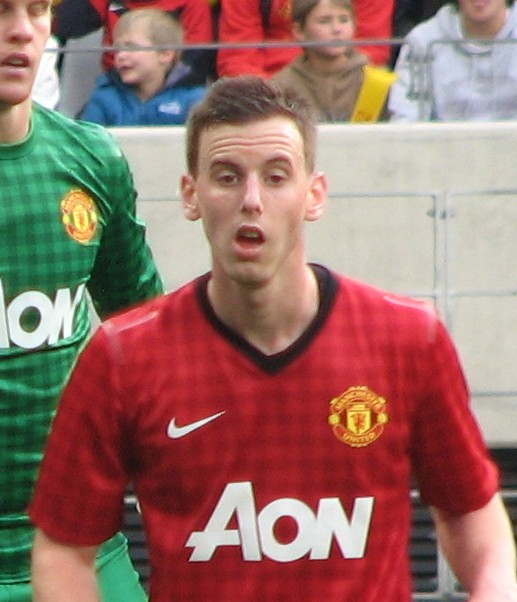
- Vermijl playing for Manchester United in 2012

Personal information
- Full name: Marnick Danny Ingrid Vermijl
- Date of birth: 13 January 1992 (age 34)
- Place of birth: Peer, Belgium
- Height: 1.80 m (5 ft 11 in)
- Position: Right-back

Team information
- Current team: Bocholt VV
- Number: 3

Youth career
- Bocholt VV
- 2008–2010: Standard Liège
- 2010–2013: Manchester United

Senior career*
Years	Team	Apps	(Gls)
2012–2015	Manchester United	0	(0)
2013–2014	→ NEC (loan)	28	(3)
2015–2016	Sheffield Wednesday	11	(0)
2015–2016	→ Preston North End (loan)	28	(1)
2016–2019	Preston North End	20	(2)
2018	→ Scunthorpe United (loan)	6	(0)
2018–2019	→ MVV (loan)	29	(2)
2019–2020	MVV	17	(0)
2020–2025	Thes Sport	110	(6)
2025–	Bocholt VV	18	(2)

International career
2008–2009	Belgium U17	12	(3)
2009–2010	Belgium U18	9	(0)
2010–2011	Belgium U19	14	(2)
2013	Belgium U21	7	(0)
- * Club domestic league appearances and goals as of 9 February 2026

Marnick Danny Ingrid Vermijl (Dutch pronunciation: [ˈmɑrnɪk fərˈmɛil]; born 13 January 1992) is a Belgian footballer who plays as a right-back for Bocholt VV.

Born in Peer, he began his career with nearby Bocholter VV, and joined the academy of Standard Liège in 2008 before being signed by English club Manchester United in 2010. He was unable to break into the Manchester United first-team and spent the 2013–14 season on loan to Dutch club NEC before moving to Sheffield Wednesday on a permanent deal in January 2015. Vermijl is also a Belgium youth international, having played at the under-17, under-18, under-19 and under-21 levels.

== Club career ==
=== Manchester United ===
Born in Peer, Vermijl was a youth player of Standard Liège, but did not play for the senior squad before moving to Manchester United for the 2010–11 season, becoming only the second Belgian player to play for the team. He made his debut in a friendly against Shamrock Rovers scoring twice and made 24 appearances for the reserve squad in his first season. He made his professional debut on 26 September 2012, in the League Cup win against Newcastle United at Old Trafford.

==== NEC ====
On 2 September 2013, Vermijl joined Dutch team NEC on loan for the duration of the 2013–14 season.

==== Sheffield Wednesday ====
Vermijl signed for Sheffield Wednesday on 2 February 2015. The terms of the deal were undisclosed.

==== Preston North End ====
Vermijl signed on loan for Preston North End on 6 August 2015. He scored his first goal for the club in a 1–0 win against Premier League side Watford in the League Cup on 25 August 2015.

Vermijl made a permanent move to Preston North End on 31 August 2016, signing a three-year deal.

==== Scunthorpe United ====
Vermijl signed on loan for Scunthorpe United on 31 January 2018. He made his first appearance for the Iron on 3 February 2018 in a 2–3 away victory over Fleetwood Town.

==== MVV Maastricht ====
Vermijl signed on a season-long loan for Eerste Divisie side MVV Maastricht on 31 August 2018.

He was released by Preston at the end of the 2018–19 season.

Vermijl signed for Maastricht on a permanent deal on 27 June 2019.

=== Thes Sport ===
On 2 July 2020, Vermijl signed with Thes Sport in the third-tier Belgian National Division 1, where he was reunited with his brother, Laurens.

== International career ==
Vermijl has 12 caps and three goals for the Belgian U17 team, nine caps and no goals for the Belgian U18 team, and 14 caps and two goals for the Belgian U19 team.

== Career statistics ==
As of match played 23 November 2024

Appearances and goals by club, season and competition
Club	Season	League			Cup		League Cup		Europe		Other (Note: Includes other competitive competitions, including the FA Community Shield)		Total	
Club	Season	Division	Apps	Goals	Apps	Goals	Apps	Goals	Apps	Goals	Apps	Goals	Apps	Goals
Manchester United	2012–13	Premier League	0	0	0	0	1	0	0	0	—		1	0
Manchester United	2013–14	Premier League	0	0	0	0	0	0	0	0	0	0	0	0
Manchester United	2014–15	Premier League	0	0	0	0	1	0	—		—		1	0
Manchester United	Total		0	0	0	0	2	0	0	0	0	0	2	0
NEC (loan)	2013–14	Eredivisie	28	3	5	1	—		—		—		33	4
Sheffield Wednesday	2014–15	Championship	11	0	—		—		—		—		11	0
Preston North End (loan)	2015–16	Championship	28	1	1	0	3	1	—		—		32	2
Sheffield Wednesday	2016–17	Championship	0	0	0	0	1	0	—		—		1	0
Preston North End	2016–17	Championship	18	2	1	0	1	0	—		—		20	2
Preston North End	2017–18	Championship	2	0	0	0	1	0	—		—		3	0
Preston North End	Total		20	2	1	0	2	0	—		—		23	2
Scunthorpe United	2017–18	League One	7	0	0	0	0	0	—		—		7	0
MVV (loan)	2018–19	Eerste Divisie	29	2	0	0	—		—		—		29	2
MVV	2019–20	Eerste Divisie	17	0	1	0	—		—		—		18	0
MVV	Total		46	2	1	0	—		—		—		47	2
Thes	2020–21	National Division 1	3	0	1	0	—		—		—		4	0
Thes	2021–22	National Division 1	23	0	0	0	—		—		—		23	0
Thes	2022–23	National Division 1	32	6	2	0	—		—		—		34	6
Thes	2023–24	National Division 1	25	0	2	1	—		—		—		27	1
Thes	2024–25	National Division 1	11	0	0	0	—		—		—		11	0
Thes	Total		94	6	5	1	—		—		—		99	7
Career total			234	14	13	2	8	1	0	0	0	0	255	17
