= Liam Grimshaw =

English footballer

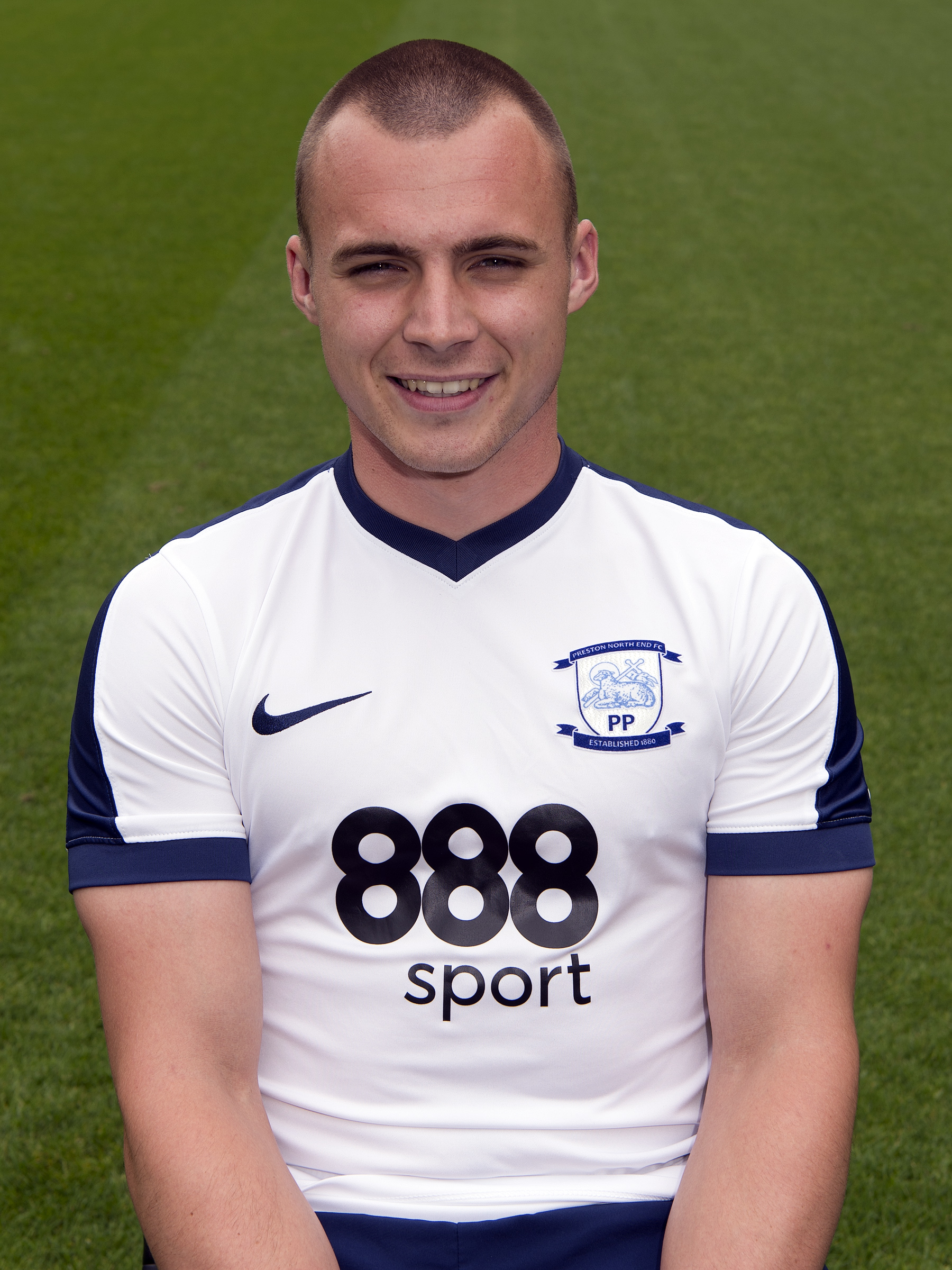
- Grimshaw with Preston North End in 2016

Personal information
- Full name: Liam David Grimshaw
- Date of birth: 2 February 1995 (age 31)
- Place of birth: Burnley, England
- Height: 1.78 m (5 ft 10 in)
- Positions: Right-back; midfielder

Youth career
- 2002–2013: Manchester United

Senior career*
Years	Team	Apps	(Gls)
2013–2016	Manchester United	0	(0)
2014	→ Morecambe (loan)	0	(0)
2015–2016	→ Motherwell (loan)	14	(0)
2016–2017	Preston North End	5	(0)
2017	→ Chesterfield (loan)	13	(0)
2017–2022	Motherwell	101	(1)
2022–2023	Greenock Morton	30	(0)
2023–2024	Dundee United	33	(0)

International career
2012–2013	England U18	2	(0)
- * Club domestic league appearances and goals as of 10:56, 21 June 2023 (UTC)

Liam David Grimshaw (born 2 February 1995) is an English professional footballer who last played as a right-back, or as a midfielder for Scottish Premiership club Dundee United. He previously played for Manchester United, Preston North End, Chesterfield, Motherwell, and Greenock Morton.

== Club career ==
=== Manchester United ===
Grimshaw joined United at schoolboy level, and later in his career went on to make his debut for the Manchester United Academy against city rivals Manchester City. During the 2012–13 season, Grimshaw was a regular in the side, notching up a total of 28 appearances and eventually forcing his way into the Manchester United reserve side during the latter stages of that campaign. Also, Grimshaw was appointed as Academy team captain, which he was to take on regularly. His eye-catching form led to Paul McGuinness, manager of the under-18's team, comparing Grimshaw with the likes of John O'Shea and Phil Neville, both of whom progressed through the youth ranks at Old Trafford.

==== Motherwell (loan) ====
Grimshaw's first taste of first-team action as a professional was with Scottish club Motherwell, whom he joined for the 2015–16 season. He made his debut for the Steelmen from the bench in a 1–1 draw at home against Ross County. In January 2016, Grimshaw was recalled from his loan at Motherwell shortly before it was due to expire.

=== Preston North End ===
On 18 January 2016, Grimshaw joined Preston North End for an undisclosed fee, signing a two-and-a-half-year contract. He was released from his contract in August 2017.

==== Chesterfield (loan) ====
On 31 January 2017, Grimshaw joined Chesterfield on loan until the end of the season. He made his debut for the club on 4 February against Oldham Athletic.

=== Motherwell ===
Grimshaw returned to Motherwell on a permanent basis in August 2017. On 16 May 2018, Grimshaw signed a new one-year contract with Motherwell. On 12 March 2019, he signed a further one-year contract keeping him at the club until 2020. Grimshaw scored his first career goal on 21 August 2021, as Motherwell won 2–1 away to Livingston. On 15 January 2020, Grimshaw signed another new contract at Motherwell, keeping him at the club until the summer of 2022. On 20 May 2022, Motherwell announced that Grimshaw would leave the club upon the expiration of his contract on 31 May 2022.

=== Greenock Morton ===
Scottish Championship club Greenock Morton signed Grimshaw to a short-term contract in September 2022. His contract was extended in December 2022 until the end of the season following a series of impressive performances. Grimshaw left the club at the end of his contract, after failing to agree terms.

=== Dundee United ===
In June 2023, Grimshaw signed a two-year deal with Scottish Championship club Dundee United. In August 2024, Grimshaw was released by Dundee United, as the Dundee based club no longer required the versatile Englishman services, allowing the player to find a new club.

== International career ==
Grimshaw's form during the 2012–13 season also saw him make his first appearance for the England Under-18s against Italy.

== Career statistics ==
As of match played 6 February 2022

Appearances and goals by club, season and competition
Club	Season	League			National Cup		League Cup		Other		Total	
Club	Season	Division	Apps	Goals	Apps	Goals	Apps	Goals	Apps	Goals	Apps	Goals
Manchester United	2015–16	Premier League	0	0	0	0	0	0	0	0	0	0
Motherwell (loan)	2015–16	Scottish Premiership	14	0	1	0	1	0	—		16	0
Preston North End	2015–16	Championship	0	0	0	0	0	0	—		0	0
Preston North End	2016–17	Championship	5	0	0	0	2	0	—		7	0
Preston North End	2017–18	Championship	0	0	0	0	1	0	—		1	0
Preston North End	Total		5	0	0	0	3	0	0	0	8	0
Chesterfield (loan)	2016–17	League One	13	0	0	0	0	0	0	0	13	0
Motherwell	2017–18	Scottish Premiership	17	0	2	0	2	0	—		21	0
Motherwell	2018–19	Scottish Premiership	31	0	0	0	3	0	—		34	0
Motherwell	2019–20	Scottish Premiership	25	0	2	0	4	0	—		31	0
Motherwell	2020–21	Scottish Premiership	14	0	0	0	1	0	2 (Note: Appearances in the UEFA Europa League)	0	17	0
Motherwell	2021–22	Scottish Premiership	14	1	0	0	1	0	—		15	1
Motherwell	Total		101	1	4	0	11	0	2	0	119	1
Career total			133	1	5	0	15	0	2	0	155	1
