= Paul Huntington =

English footballer (born 1987)

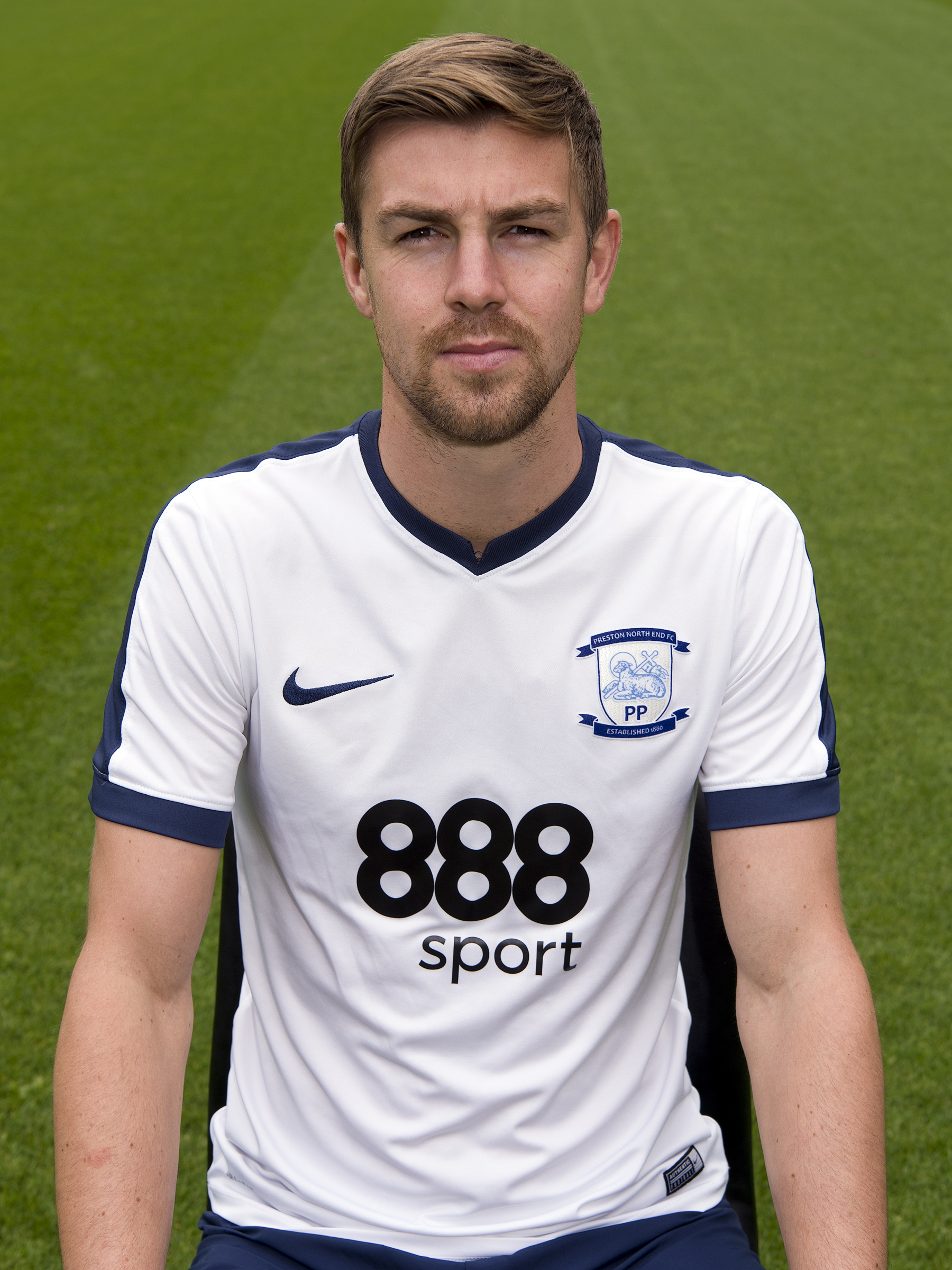
- Huntington with Preston North End in 2016

Personal information
- Full name: Paul David Huntington
- Date of birth: 17 September 1987 (age 39)
- Place of birth: Carlisle, England
- Height: 1.91 m (6 ft 3 in)
- Position: Defender

Youth career
- –2005: Newcastle United

Senior career*
Years	Team	Apps	(Gls)
2005–2007	Newcastle United	11	(1)
2007–2010	Leeds United	21	(2)
2009	→ Stockport County (loan)	9	(0)
2010	Stockport County	17	(0)
2010–2012	Yeovil Town	77	(7)
2012–2022	Preston North End	260	(12)
2022–2024	Carlisle United	60	(3)
2024–2025	Bradford City	19	(0)
Total		474	(25)
- * Club domestic league appearances and goals

Paul David Huntington (born 17 September 1987) is an English former professional footballer who played as a centre-back.

== Club career ==
=== Newcastle United ===
Huntington joined Newcastle United Academy on 1 July 2004. He was promoted to the reserve squad in late 2004 to play tougher opposition and gain experience. He made his reserve debut for the club on 7 December in a 3–0 home win over Middlesbrough, and made his official England Under 18 debut against Scotland fifteen days later where he won 1–0, partnered with David Wheater at centre back. He got his 2nd cap on 10 June 2005 vs. Norway at Vale Park in a 0–0 draw. He signed his first professional contract at the club in July 2005.

His first involvement with the first team at Newcastle was when he appeared on the bench for the club's Intertoto Cup games against ZTS Dubnica and Deportivo La Coruña in July 2005. In the summer of 2005 he was awarded the prestigious Jackie Milburn trophy. He was named for the first team squad for the FA Cup third-round tie against Mansfield Town. He made the substitutes bench for the UEFA Cup match against Celta Vigo.

On 9 December 2006 he made his first Newcastle appearance as a late substitute against Blackburn Rovers and duly received praise from Newcastle legend Alan Shearer on BBC programme "Match of the Day". On 14 December he started his first game for Newcastle, appearing at right back away at Chelsea in the Premier League. In that game, he received the Man of the Match accolade. He scored his first ever goal for Newcastle on 14 January 2007, the first equaliser in Newcastle's 3–2 win over Tottenham Hotspur at White Hart Lane. He played in a UEFA Cup last-16 match against AZ Alkmaar, losing on away goals over the two legs. He went on to make 16 appearances for the first team whilst making the bench for most of the 2006–07 season.

=== Leeds United ===
On 31 August 2007, he transferred to Leeds United for an undisclosed fee. He made his home debut for the club as a substitute in the 2–0 victory on 8 September at home to Hartlepool United.

On 9 October 2007, he opened his Leeds account by scoring against Darlington in the Football League Trophy Second Round on his full debut to help Leeds move to the next stage. He scored his first league goal against Luton Town on 26 January 2008. He scored against Leyton Orient on 5 April. There were controversies surrounding whether it was Huntington or Bradley Johnson who scored the goal, but it was officially given to Huntington.

Huntington was Leeds' first-choice centre-back. He was in good form during the run-in to the end of the 2007–08 season. Manager Gary McAllister said Huntington had a bright future ahead of him. Huntington played at Wembley on 25 May 2008 in the League One Play-Off Final against Doncaster, losing 1–0. He was handed the captain's armband during the 2008–09 pre-season tour of Ireland in the game against Shelbourne. He was ruled out during the remainder of the season after undergoing hernia and groin operations. At this time, Gary McAllister was fired and replaced by Simon Grayson.

On 10 September 2009, Huntington joined League One rivals Stockport County on a month's loan. He made his Stockport debut in the 2–2 draw against Yeovil Town, and then made the League 1 team of the week after his appearance against Huddersfield. After nine appearances for Stockport, his two-month loan ended. Stockport County wanted to extend the loan for a third and final month but Huntington was told to return by Leeds United.

=== Stockport County ===
After leaving Leeds, he signed to Stockport County on a 1 February 2010.

=== Yeovil Town ===
On 16 July 2010 Huntington signed to Yeovil Town on a two-year contract. He scored his first goal for Yeovil and their 3rd in a 3–1 win over Tranmere Rovers on 11 September and made the League One Team of the Week. He repeated this achievement on 9 October after a 1–0 win at Rochdale. On 3 January 2011 he scored the only goal in a 1–0 win against Milton Keynes Dons at home and received Man of the Match. He won the League One Player of the Month for January, beating competition from Brighton & Hove Albion's Elliott Bennett, Craig Dawson from Rochdale, and AFC Bournemouth's Liam Feeney to win this award which was presented by his manager Terry Skiverton. During this month he scored three times against Sheffield Wednesday, Milton Keynes Dons, and Brentford and was part of a defence that kept four clean sheets. He was appointed captain of the club as Yeovil finished in 14th place, their second highest finish. He was runner-up in the Green and White Player of the Season Award and the Western Gazette Player of the Season Award.

Huntington scored his first goal of the 2011/12 season in the 3–2 home defeat against Charlton Athletic on Boxing Day and followed this up with a goal in the New Year's Eve defeat against Bournemouth. On 22 May 2012, the club announced that he had rejected a new deal citing that he wanted to move to a club closer to his hometown.

=== Preston North End ===
Following his rejection of a new contract with Yeovil Town, he joined Preston North End. He scored his first goal for Preston against Crawley Town in a 2–1 loss. He then scored in the JPT 2nd round in a 4–2 win at Morecambe, On Tuesday 9 October 2012. Huntington scored his 3rd goal of the season away at Tranmere Rovers in a 1–1 draw on 27 October 2012. On 8 December he scored against Crewe Alexandra. On 11 April 2013 Huntington was nominated for Npower League One Player of the Month for March with three clean sheets.

His first goal of the 2013/14 season came on 14 September against Stevenage in a 3–0 win. On 17 December 2013, Huntington extended his contract with Preston North End, thus keeping him at the club until the summer of 2015. His second goal of the season came in a 2–2 draw at Crawley Town on 14 December.

Huntington scored his first goal of the 2014–15 season on 21 October with a powerful header at Gillingham in a 1–0 win. He scored his second goal in three league games at Leyton Orient on 28 October 2014 in a 2–0 win. His third goal of the season came against ex-club Yeovil Town on 29 November in a 2–0 victory, heading into the top left corner. On 6 December Huntington's left-footed half volley was the winning goal in a 1–0 2nd round FA Cup tie at home to Shrewsbury Town; it was his 4th goal in 13 games. His goalscoring run continued on 16 December when he scored the winning goal in a 1–0 victory at Notts County, in the northern section semi-final of the Football League Trophy. He headed his 6th goal of the season away at Crawley Town on 31 January 2015. He followed it up with his second goal in two games at Sheffield United in the FA Cup 4th round replay at Bramall Lane 3 February in a 3–1 win. Huntington's 8th goal of the season came away at Oldham Athletic 28 February in a 4–0 win.

He won promotion with the Lilywhites in the 2014–15 season, scoring the second goal of a 4–0 victory over Swindon Town in the 2015 League One Play-Off Final at Wembley. Huntington won the Sir Tom Finney Trophy for the 2014/15 season awarded by the supporters. He signed a new two-year contract with Preston North End on 26 May 2015 which ran until the summer of 2017.

On 16 November 2015 Huntington won League One Player of the Year at the North West Football Awards for the 2014–15 season. Preston North End finished 11th in their first season in the EFL Championship after gaining promotion.

Huntington signed a new two-year contract with Preston North End on 22 August 2016 with the option of a third year. His first goal of the 2016-17 season came on 14 January 2017, scoring a header against Brighton & Hove Albion in a 2–0 win and was subsequently named in the EFL Team of the Week. Huntington extended his contract with Preston North End until the summer of 2019. A second 11th-placed finish in the Championship was achieved in the 2016/17 season

He scored his only goal of the 2017-18 season against Nottingham Forest on 23 December in a 1–1 draw. Preston just missed out on the play-off places on the last day of the season in May 2018, finishing 7th.

On 10 July 2018 Huntington signed a new three-year contract with Preston North End.

On 28 December 2020 Huntington signed a contract extension with Preston North End for a 10th year until 30 June 2022. He was released at the end of the 2021–22 season.

=== Carlisle United ===
On 10 August 2022, Carlisle United signed a one-year contract with League Two club Carlisle United.

Huntington won promotion to League One via the play offs on 28 May 2023 after captaining the side to victory over Stockport County at Wembley.

On 20 February 2023 the club said it was giving the player another one year contract, for the 2023/24 season.

On 29 April 2024 the club announced that Huntington would be leaving the club once the contract had expired.

=== Bradford City ===
On 1 October 2024, Huntington signed for League Two club Bradford City on a short-term deal until January 2025.

At the end of the 2024–25 season, Huntington was invited back to train with Bradford City. In November 2025, Huntington announced his retirement from football aged 38.

== Career statistics ==
Appearances and goals by club, season and competition
Club	Season	League			FA Cup		League Cup		Other		Total	
Club	Season	Division	Apps	Goals	Apps	Goals	Apps	Goals	Apps	Goals	Apps	Goals
Newcastle United	2006–07	Premier League	11	1	2	0	1	0	2 (Note: Appearances in UEFA Cup)	0	16	1
Leeds United	2007–08	League One	17	2	2	0	0	0	5 (Note: Three appearances in League One play-offs, two appearances and one goal in Football League Trophy)	1	24	3
Leeds United	2008–09	League One	4	0	0	0	2	0	1 (Note: Appearance(s) in Football League Trophy)	0	7	0
Leeds United	2009–10	League One	0	0	0	0	1	0	0	0	1	0
Leeds United	Total		21	2	2	0	3	0	6	1	32	3
Stockport County	2009–10	League One	26	0	0	0	0	0	0	0	26	0
Yeovil Town	2010–11	League One	40	5	1	0	1	0	1	0	43	5
Yeovil Town	2011–12	League One	37	2	3	0	1	0	1	0	42	2
Yeovil Town	Total		77	7	4	0	2	0	2	0	85	7
Preston North End	2012–13	League One	37	3	3	0	3	0	1	1	44	4
Preston North End	2013–14	League One	23	2	4	0	2	0	1	0	30	2
Preston North End	2014–15	League One	32	5	6	2	0	0	9 (Note: Three appearances, one goal in League One play-offs, six appearances, one goal in Football League Trophy)	2	47	9
Preston North End	2015–16	Championship	38	0	1	0	2	0	—		41	0
Preston North End	2016–17	Championship	33	1	1	0	4	0	—		38	1
Preston North End	2017–18	Championship	44	1	2	0	0	0	—		46	1
Preston North End	2018–19	Championship	22	0	1	0	2	0	—		25	0
Preston North End	2019–20	Championship	9	0	0	0	1	1	—		10	1
Preston North End	2020–21	Championship	21	0	1	0	2	0	—		24	0
Preston North End	2021–22	Championship	1	0	0	0	0	0	—		1	0
Preston North End	Total		260	12	19	2	16	1	11	3	306	18
Carlisle United	2022–23	League Two	40	2	2	0	0	0	3 (Note: Appearance in League Two play-offs)	0	45	2
Carlisle United	2023–24	League One	20	1	0	0	0	0	0	0	20	1
Carlisle United	Total		60	3	2	0	0	0	0	0	65	3
Bradford City	2024–25	League Two	19	0	1	0	0	0	2 (Note: Appearance in EFL Trophy)	0	22	0
Career total			474	25	30	2	22	1	26	4	552	32

== Honours ==
Preston North End

- Football League One play-offs: 2015

Carlisle United

- EFL League Two play-offs: 2023

Bradford City

- EFL League Two third-place promotion: 2024–25

Individual

- Preston North End Player of the Year: 2014–15
- North West Football Awards League One Player of the Year: 2014–15
