= Clive Smith (footballer, born 1997) =

Welsh footballer

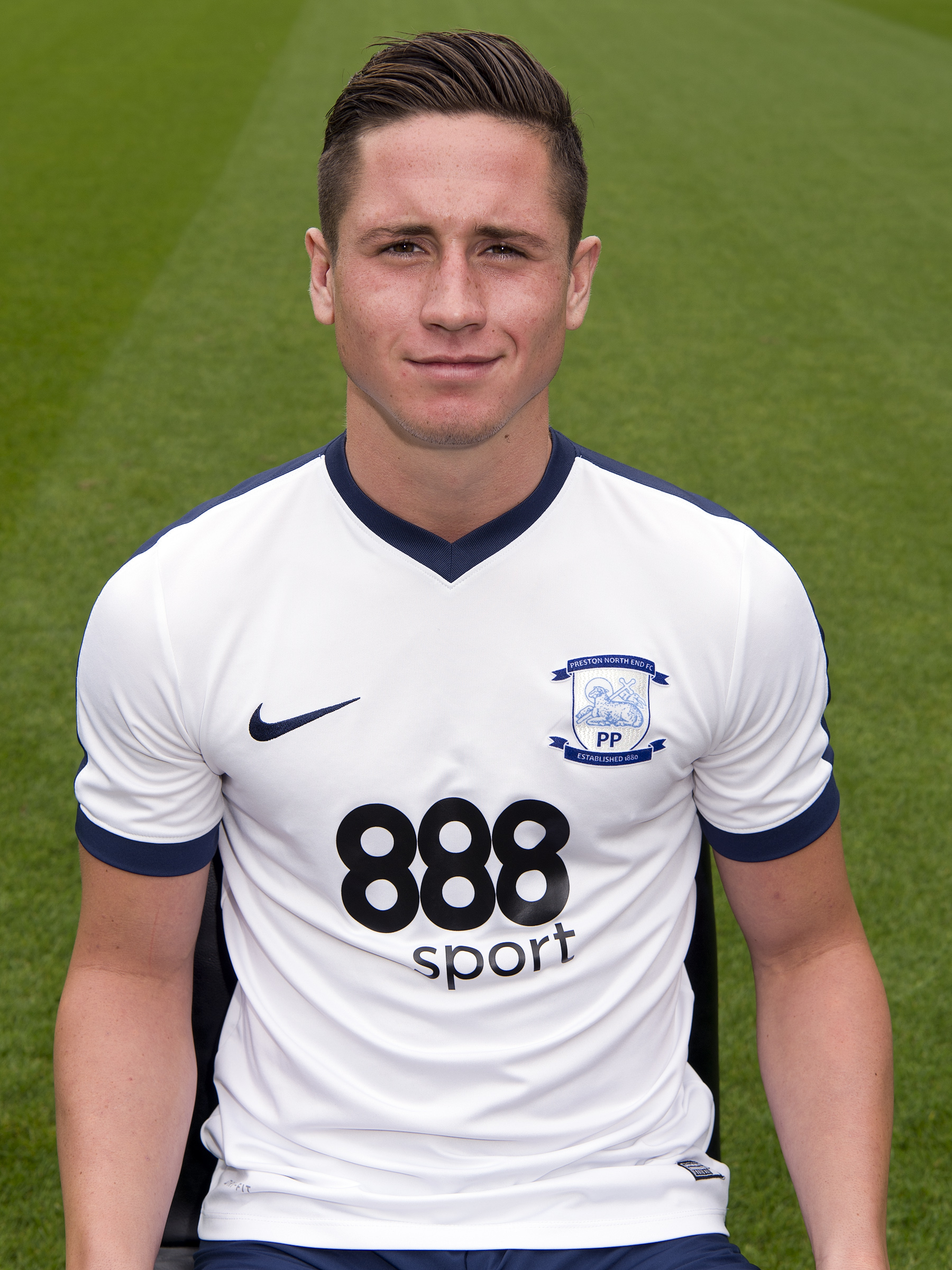

Personal information
- Date of birth: 12 December 1997 (age 28)
- Position: Right back

Team information
- Current team: Warrington Rylands

Senior career*
Years	Team	Apps	(Gls)
2016–2017	Preston North End	0	(0)
2016	→ Bamber Bridge (loan)		
2017	→ St Johnstone (loan)	2	(0)
2017–2018	Southport	13	(1)
2018	Droylsden		
2018–2022	Atherton Collieries	112	(3)
2022	FC United of Manchester	5	(0)
2022–2023	Atherton Collieries	27	(0)
2023–	Warrington Rylands	0	(0)
- * Club domestic league appearances and goals as of 13:42, 18 May 2023 (UTC)

Clive Smith (born 12 December 1997) is a Welsh professional footballer who plays as a right back for Warrington Rylands.

== Career ==
Smith began his career with Preston North End, turning professional in January 2016.

In late 2016 he was on loan at non-league side Bamber Bridge, and he moved on loan to Scottish club St Johnstone in January 2017.

In May 2017 it was announced that Smith would leave Preston at the end of the season when his contract expired. He signed for Southport in December 2017.

In August 2018, he left Southport and joined Droylsden. In December 2018, he signed for Atherton Collieries. He made his debut a week later in a 2–1 win over Colwyn Bay. In June 2022, Smith joined FC United of Manchester. Smith left the club in September 2022. Following his departure, Smith returned to Atherton Collieries. In May 2023, he joined Warrington Rylands.
