= 2014–15 Preston North End F.C. season =

English football club season

Preston North End F.C.
2014–15 season
- Manager: Simon Grayson
- Stadium: Deepdale
- League One: 3rd (promoted via play-offs)
- FA Cup: Fifth round
- League Cup: Second round
- FL Trophy: Area final
- Top goalscorer: League: Joe Garner (26); All: Joe Garner (27)
- Highest home attendance: 21,438 vs Manchester United(FA Cup, 16 Feb 15)
- Lowest home attendance: 3,836 vs Port Vale(FL Trophy, 7 Oct 14)
Home colours	Away colours

The 2014–15 season was Preston North End's 127th in the Football League. It was their fourth consecutive season in the third tier of English football, League One, following failure to be promoted by play-offs the previous season for the ninth time. The season ended with Preston being promoted to the Championship via the play-offs, following a 4–0 win over Swindon Town at Wembley Stadium.

== Season overview ==
In his second summer in charge Simon Grayson signed 5 players permanently – Jamie Jones, Calum Woods, Jordan Hugill, Andy Little and Kyel Reid and brought Paul Gallagher in on a season long loan. Preston also signed Callum Robinson on a two-month youth loan in September and Jermaine Beckford on a season long loan in November.

Preston allowed 9 players to leave Deepdale during the summer, those being Chris Beardsley, Shane Cansdell-Sherriff, Ryan Croasdale, Graham Cummins, Iain Hume, John Mousinho, Alex Nicholson, Nicky Wroe and Stuart Beavon.

Preston started the season strongly, winning 2 and drawing 3 of the first five league games of the season. Preston suffered their first league loss of the season, against Walsall F.C. in their sixth game of the season. Of their next 8 games, Preston won 7 and drew 1. After their first 14 games, Preston were in 2nd place, on 31 points, two points behind league leaders Bristol City F.C., but 5 points clear of 3rd place Swindon Town F.C.

Preston then went on to lose their next 3 league games, against Rochdale, Swindon Town F.C. and Bradford City.

In the midst of the league campaign, Preston were involved in 3 separate cup competitions. Preston found success in the Football League Trophy, reaching the Northern section final – losing 2–0 on aggregate to Walsall. In the League Cup, Preston faced, and defeated Rochdale in round 1, before being beaten by Middlesbrough in the second round. In the opening 3 rounds of the FA Cup, Preston defeated Havant & Waterlooville in the first round, Shrewsbury Town in the second and Norwich City in the third round to put them in the hat for a potentially money-spinning trip to a Premier League side in the fourth round of the cup.

Meanwhile, in Preston's next 10 games, they won 4, drew 4 and lost 2 – although they did go on a 5 match winless run, culminating in a loss against Crawley Town. During this run, Preston also faced Sheffield United in the FA Cup in the fourth Round. They drew 1–1 in the first game, before winning 3–1 in the replay. This set up a fifth round home tie against Manchester United.

Following Preston securing a home tie in the FA Cup against Manchester United, they went on an 18-game unbeaten run, winning 12 and drawing 6 of those games, including notable wins against promotion rivals MK Dons and Swindon Town placed them in prime position for automatic promotion, needing to win against relegation threatened Colchester United on the final day. Preston lost the game 1–0, whilst MK Dons won, meaning that Preston finished the season in 3rd place and were in the play-offs again. Simon Grayson's side had been in the top two since the start of March and had not lost in the league since 31 January. They faced Chesterfield in the semifinals of the playoffs.

In the FA Cup, Preston lost 3–1 to Manchester United, despite taking the lead through Scott Laird. That was Preston's only defeat during their unbeaten run between January and May.

In the first leg of the playoffs, Preston won 1–0, thanks to a goal from Jermaine Beckford. In the second leg they won 3–0 thanks to Joe Garner's penalty and Jermaine Beckford's brace. They won the semifinals 4–0 on aggregate and set up a play off final against Swindon Town. Preston, who had never won in the playoffs in their previous nine appearances – which was a record at the time, beat Swindon Town 4–0 in the play-off final, including a hat-trick by Jermaine Beckford, winning promotion to the Championship.

== Squad ==
No.	Name	Position (s)	Nationality	Place of Birth	Date of Birth (Age)	Club caps	Club goals	Signed from	Date signed	Fee	Contract End
Goalkeepers
1	Jamies Jones	GK	(England)	Kirkby	18 February 1989 (age 37)	20	0	Leyton Orient	1 July 2014	Free	30 June 2016
21	Thorsten Stuckmann	GK	(Germany)	Gütersloh	17 March 1981 (age 45)	75	0	Free agent	1 November 2011	Free	30 June 2015
26	Steven James	GK	(England)	Stockport	19 December 1994 (age 31)	0	0	Academy	1 July 2013	Trainee	30 June 2015
34	Sam Johnstone	GK	(England)	Preston	25 March 1993 (age 33)	26	0	Manchester United	12 January 2015	Loan	30 June 2015
Defenders
3	Scott Laird	LB/LM/CM	(England)	Taunton	15 May 1988 (age 38)	104	7	Stevenage	27 May 2012	Free	30 June 2015
4	Scott Wiseman	RB/CB	(Gibraltar)	Kingston upon Hull	9 October 1985 (age 41)	46	2	Barnsley	10 January 2014	Free	30 June 2015
5	Tom Clarke	CB/RB	(England)	Sowerby Bridge	21 December 1987 (age 38)	107	7	Huddersfield Town	22 May 2013	Free	30 June 2015
6	Bailey Wright	CB	(Australia)	Melbourne	28 July 1992 (age 34)	140	8	Academy	1 July 2009	Trainee	30 June 2015
15	Calum Woods	LB/RB	(England)	Liverpool	5 February 1987 (age 39)	27	0	Huddersfield Town	1 July 2014	Free	30 June 2016
16	David Buchanan	LB/LM	(England)	Rochdale	6 May 1986 (age 40)	87	0	Tranmere Rovers	24 May 2012	Free	30 June 2015
20	Ben Davies	LB/CB	(England)	Barrow-in-Furness	11 August 1995 (age 31)	9	0	Academy	25 January 2013	Trainee	30 June 2016
23	Paul Huntington	CB/RB	(England)	Carlisle	17 September 1987 (age 39)	120	15	Yeovil Town	1 July 2012	Free	30 June 2015
33	Nick Anderton	LB	(England)		22 April 1996 (age 30)	0	0	Academy	1 July 2014	Trainee	30 June 2015
Defenders
2	Keith Keane	CM/RB	(Republic of Ireland)	Luton	20 November 1986 (age 39)	74	3	Luton Town	1 July 2012	Free	30 June 2015
7	Chris Humphrey	RW/RB	(Jamaica)	Saint Catherine	19 September 1987 (age 39)	103	7	Motherwell	4 June 2013	Free	30 June 2015
8	Neil Kilkenny	CM	(Australia)	Enfield	19 December 1985 (age 40)	78	3	Bristol City	14 November 2013	Free	30 June 2016
11	Lee Holmes	LM/RM/AM	(England)	Mansfield	2 April 1987 (age 39)	73	6	Southampton	29 May 2012	Free	30 June 2015
17	Kyel Reid	LW/RW	(England)	Deptford	26 November 1987 (age 38)	26	0	Bradford City	1 July 2014	Free	30 June 2016
19	John Welsh	CM	(England)	Liverpool	10 January 1984 (age 42)	128	3	Tranmere Rovers	14 May 2012	Free	30 June 2015
22	Jack King	CM/CF/CB	(England)	Oxford	20 August 1985 (age 41)	100	10	Woking	31 May 2012	Free	30 June 2015
24	Daniel Johnson	CM	(Jamaica)	Kingston	8 October 1992 (age 34)	23	8	Aston Villa	23 January 2015	£50,000	30 June 2017
30	Josh Brownhill	CM	(England)	Warrington	19 December 1995 (age 30)	56	7	Academy	1 July 2013	Trainee	30 June 2015
31	Alan Browne	CM	(Republic of Ireland)	Cork	15 April 1995 (age 31)	40	4	Free agent	1 January 2014	Free	30 June 2016
Forwards
9	Kevin Davies	CF	(England)	Sheffield	26 March 1977 (age 49)	85	6	Bolton Wanderers	10 July 2013	Free	30 June 2015
10	Jermaine Beckford	CF	(Jamaica)	London	3 December 1983 (age 42)	30	16	Bolton Wanderers	20 November 2014	Loan	30 June 2015
12	Paul Gallagher	CF/RW	(Scotland)	Glasgow	9 August 1984 (age 42)	107	25	Leicester City	5 July 2014	Loan	31 May 2015
14	Joe Garner	CF/RW	(England)	Blackburn	12 April 1988 (age 38)	101	49	Watford	8 January 2013	Free	30 June 2015
18	Andy Little	CF/FB	(Northern Ireland)	Enniskillen	12 March 1989 (age 37)	16	2	Rangers	21 June 2014	Free	30 June 2016
25	Jordan Hugill	CF	(England)	Middlesbrough	4 June 1992 (age 34)	6	2	Port Vale	19 June 2014	Undisclosed	30 June 2016
27	Callum Robinson	CF	(England)	Northampton	2 February 1995 (age 31)	27	7	Aston Villa	2 February 2015	Loan	30 June 2015
33	Jack Ryan	CF	(England)	Barrow-in-Furness	5 April 1995 (age 31)	2	0	Academy	1 July 2014	Trainee	30 June 2015
40	Sylvan Ebanks-Blake	CF	(England)	Cambridge	29 March 1986 (age 40)	12	1	Ipswich Town	1 January 2015	Free	30 June 2015

=== Statistics ===
As of 4 May 2015

No.	Pos	Nat	Player	Total		League		FA Cup		League Cup		League Trophy	
No.	Pos	Nat	Player	Apps	Goals	Apps	Goals	Apps	Goals	Apps	Goals	Apps	Goals
1	GK	(England) ENG	Jamie Jones (on loan at Rochdale)	20	0	17+0	0	0+0	0	2+0	0	1+0	0
2	MF	(Republic of Ireland) IRL	Keith Keane	0	0	0+0	0	0+0	0	0+0	0	0+0	0
3	DF	(England) ENG	Scott Laird	38	2	26+3	0	3+0	1	1+0	0	4+1	1
4	DF	(Gibraltar) GIB	Scott Wiseman	31	2	18+5	2	2+1	0	1+0	0	4+0	0
5	DF	(England) ENG	Tom Clarke	55	2	42+1	1	4+0	0	2+0	0	6+0	1
6	DF	(Australia) AUS	Bailey Wright	30	1	27+0	1	2+0	0	1+0	0	0+0	0
7	MF	(Jamaica) JAM	Chris Humphrey	53	5	31+12	4	4+1	0	0+1	0	3+1	1
8	MF	(Australia) AUS	Neil Kilkenny	46	1	24+11	0	4+0	0	2+0	1	4+1	0
9	FW	(England) ENG	Kevin Davies	42	1	7+23	1	3+2	0	1+1	0	4+1	0
10	FW	(Jamaica) JAM	Jermaine Beckford (on loan from Bolton Wanderers)	25	12	19+4	12	1+1	0	0+0	0	0+0	0
11	MF	(England) ENG	Lee Holmes	1	0	0+0	0	0+0	0	0+0	0	0+1	0
12	FW	(Scotland) SCO	Paul Gallagher (on loan from Leicester City)	55	13	45+1	7	4+0	5	1+0	0	4+0	1
14	FW	(England) ENG	Joe Garner	41	26	36+1	25	1+1	0	0+0	0	1+1	1
15	DF	(England) ENG	Calum Woods	24	0	12+6	0	3+0	0	1+0	0	2+0	0
16	DF	(England) ENG	David Buchanan	25	0	17+0	0	3+0	0	0+0	0	4+1	0
17	MF	(England) ENG	Kyel Reid	26	0	5+9	0	3+2	0	0+0	0	4+3	0
18	FW	(Northern Ireland) NIR	Andy Little	16	2	5+7	1	1+0	0	1+1	1	1+0	0
19	MF	(England) ENG	John Welsh	41	0	30+2	0	3+1	0	1+0	0	4+0	0
20	DF	(England) ENG	Ben Davies	6	0	4+0	0	0+0	0	2+0	0	0+0	0
21	GK	(Germany) GER	Thorsten Stuckmann	16	0	5+0	0	5+0	0	0+0	0	6+0	0
22	MF	(England) ENG	Jack King	28	1	10+8	1	1+1	0	1+0	0	5+2	0
23	DF	(England) ENG	Paul Huntington	44	8	32+0	5	5+0	2	0+0	0	7+0	1
24	MF	(Jamaica) JAM	Daniel Johnson	20	8	20+0	8	0+0	0	0+0	0	0+0	0
25	FW	(England) ENG	Jordan Hugill (on loan at Tranmere Rovers)	6	2	0+3	0	0+0	0	1+1	1	1+0	1
26	GK	(England) ENG	Steven James	0	0	0+0	0	0+0	0	0+0	0	0+0	0
27	FW	(England) ENG	Callum Robinson (on loan from Aston Villa)	26	7	17+7	4	0+1	0	0+0	0	1+0	3
30	MF	(England) ENG	Josh Brownhill	28	2	13+5	2	2+1	0	1+1	0	4+1	0
31	MF	(Republic of Ireland) IRL	Alan Browne	30	3	14+6	3	1+2	0	2+0	0	4+1	0
32	DF	(England) ENG	Nick Anderton	0	0	0+0	0	0+0	0	0+0	0	0+0	0
33	FW	(England) ENG	Jack Ryan (on loan at Stockport County)	2	0	0+1	0	0+0	0	0+0	0	0+1	0
34	GK	(England) ENG	Sam Johnstone (on loan from Manchester United)	23	0	23+0	0	0+0	0	0+0	0	0+0	0
40	FW	(England) ENG	Sylvan Ebanks-Blake	13	1	1+8	1	1+1	0	0+0	0	0+2	0
Players who have left the club:
13	MF	(England) ENG	Joel Byrom	0	0	0+0	0	0+0	0	0+0	0	0+0	0
24	MF	(England) ENG	Will Hayhurst	11	0	2+5	0	0+0	0	1+1	0	1+1	0

==== Play-off appearances ====
No.	Pos	Nat	Player	Total		League One Play-offs	
No.	Pos	Nat	Player	Apps	Goals	Apps	Goals
3	DF	(England) ENG	Scott Laird	3	0	1+2	0
5	DF	(England) ENG	Tom Clarke	3	0	3+0	0
6	DF	(Australia) AUS	Bailey Wright	3	0	3+0	0
7	MF	(Jamaica) JAM	Chris Humphrey	2	0	1+1	0
8	MF	(Australia) AUS	Neil Kilkenny	3	0	2+1	0
9	FW	(England) ENG	Kevin Davies	1	0	0+1	0
10	FW	(Jamaica) JAM	Jermaine Beckford (on loan from Bolton Wanderers)	3	6	3+0	6
12	FW	(Scotland) SCO	Paul Gallagher (on loan from Leicester City)	3	0	3+0	0
14	FW	(England) ENG	Joe Garner	3	1	3+0	1
15	DF	(England) ENG	Calum Woods	3	0	2+1	0
16	DF	(England) ENG	David Buchanan	1	0	1+0	0
19	MF	(England) ENG	John Welsh	3	0	3+0	0
23	DF	(England) ENG	Paul Huntington	3	1	3+0	1
24	MF	(Jamaica) JAM	Daniel Johnson	3	0	3+0	0
27	FW	(England) ENG	Callum Robinson (on loan from Aston Villa)	1	0	1+0	0
31	MF	(Republic of Ireland) IRL	Alan Browne	2	0	0+2	0
34	GK	(England) ENG	Sam Johnstone (on loan from Manchester United)	3	0	3+0	0

==== Captains ====
As of 13 May 2015

No.	P	Name	Country	No. games	Notes
5	DF	Tom Clarke	(England)	56	
19	MF	John Welsh	(England)	3	
14	FW	Joe Garner	(England)	2	
6	DF	Bailey Wright	(Australia)	1	

Source: Competitive match reports.
Competitive matches only
Matches started as captain only
Country: FIFA nationality; No.: Squad number; P: Position; Name: Player name; No. Games: Number of games started as captain.

==== Goals record ====
As of 13 May 2015

Rank	No.	Po.	Name	League One	FA Cup	League Cup	League Trophy	Play-offs	Total
1	14	FW	(England) Joe Garner	25	0	0	1	1	27
2	10	FW	(Jamaica) Jermaine Beckford	12	0	0	0	6	18
3	12	FW	(Scotland) Paul Gallagher	7	5	0	1	0	13
4	23	DF	(England) Paul Huntington	5	2	0	1	1	9
5	24	MF	(Jamaica) Daniel Johnson	8	0	0	0	0	8
6	27	FW	(England) Callum Robinson	4	0	0	3	0	7
7	7	MF	(Jamaica) Chris Humphrey	4	0	0	1	0	5
8	31	MF	(England) Alan Browne	3	0	0	0	0	3
10	3	DF	(England) Scott Laird	0	1	0	1	0	2
10	4	DF	(Gibraltar) Scott Wiseman	2	0	0	0	0	2
10	5	DF	(England) Tom Clarke	1	0	0	1	0	2
10	18	FW	(Northern Ireland) Andy Little	1	0	1	0	0	2
10	25	FW	(England) Jordan Hugill	0	0	1	1	0	2
10	30	MF	(England) Josh Brownhill	2	0	0	0	0	2
16	6	DF	(Australia) Bailey Wright	1	0	0	0	0	1
16	8	MF	(Australia) Neil Kilkenny	0	0	1	0	0	1
16	9	FW	(England) Kevin Davies	1	0	0	0	0	1
16	22	MF	(England) Jack King	1	0	0	0	0	1
16	40	FW	(England) Sylvan Ebanks-Blake	1	0	0	0	0	1
Own Goals				1	0	0	0	0	1
Total				78	8	3	10	7	106

==== Disciplinary record ====
As of 13 May 2015

No.	Po.	Name	League One		FA Cup		League Cup		League Trophy		Play-offs		Total	
No.	Po.	Name	Yellow card	Red card	Yellow card	Red card	Yellow card	Red card	Yellow card	Red card	Yellow card	Red card	Yellow card	Red card
1	GK	(England) Jamie Jones	1	0	0	0	0	0	0	0	0	0	1	0
3	DF	(England) Scott Laird	3	0	1	0	0	0	0	0	0	0	4	0
4	DF	(Gibraltar) Scott Wiseman	3	0	0	0	0	0	0	0	0	0	3	0
5	DF	(England) Tom Clarke	6	0	0	0	0	0	2	0	1	0	9	0
6	DF	(Australia) Bailey Wright	3	0	0	0	0	0	0	0	0	0	3	0
7	MF	(Jamaica) Chris Humphrey	3	0	0	0	0	0	0	0	0	0	3	0
8	MF	(Australia) Neil Kilkenny	4	0	1	0	1	0	1	0	0	0	7	0
9	FW	(England) Kevin Davies	2	0	1	0	0	0	0	0	0	0	3	0
10	FW	(Jamaica) Jermaine Beckford	4	0	0	0	0	0	0	0	1	0	5	0
12	FW	(Scotland) Paul Gallagher	5	0	2	0	0	0	1	0	1	0	9	0
14	FW	(England) Joe Garner	8	0	0	0	0	0	1	0	1	0	10	0
15	DF	(England) Calum Woods	2	0	0	0	0	0	1	0	0	0	3	0
16	DF	(England) David Buchanan	2	0	0	0	0	0	0	0	0	0	2	0
18	FW	(Northern Ireland) Andy Little	2	0	0	0	0	0	1	0	0	0	3	0
19	MF	(England) John Welsh	9	0	0	0	0	0	0	0	0	0	9	0
21	GK	(Germany) Thorsten Stuckmann	0	0	1	0	0	0	0	0	0	0	1	0
22	MF	(England) Jack King	2	0	1	0	0	0	0	0	0	0	3	0
23	DF	(England) Paul Huntington	7	0	1	0	0	0	0	0	0	0	8	0
24	MF	(Jamaica) Daniel Johnson	1	0	0	0	0	0	0	0	0	0	1	0
25	FW	(England) Jordan Hugill	0	1	0	0	0	0	0	0	0	0	0	1
31	MF	(Republic of Ireland) Alan Browne	1	0	0	0	1	0	0	0	0	0	2	0
34	GK	(England) Sam Johnstone	2	0	0	0	0	0	0	0	0	0	2	0
Total			70	1	8	0	2	0	7	0	4	0	95	1

=== Contracts ===
No.	Pos.	Nat.	Name	Age	Status	Contract length	Expiry date	Source
20	DF	(England)	Ben Davies	18	Extended	1 year	June 2015	
26	GK	(England)	Steven James	19	Extended	1 year	June 2015	
20	DF	(England)	Ben Davies	18	Signed	2 years	June 2016	
8	MF	(Australia) (England)	Neil Kilkenny	28	Signed	2 years	June 2016	
31	MF	(Republic of Ireland)	Alan Browne	19	Signed	2 years	June 2016	

== Transfers ==
=== In ===
No.	Pos.	Nat.	Name	Age	EU	Moving from	Type	Transfer window	Ends	Transfer fee	Source
1	GK	(England)	Jamie Jones	25	EU	Leyton Orient	Bosman	Summer	2016	Free	
15	DF	(England)	Calum Woods	27	EU	Huddersfield Town	Bosman	Summer	2016	Free	
25	FW	(England)	Jordan Hugill	22	EU	Port Vale	Transfer	Summer	2016	Undisclosed	
18	FW	(Northern Ireland)	Andrew Little	25	EU	Rangers (Scotland)	Bosman	Summer	2016	Free	
17	MF	(England)	Kyel Reid	26	EU	Bradford City	Bosman	Summer	2016	Free	
40	FW	(England)	Sylvan Ebanks-Blake	28	EU	Ipswich Town	Bosman	Winter	2015	Free	
24	MF	(Jamaica)	Daniel Johnson	22	EU	Aston Villa	Transfer	Winter	2017	£50,000	

=== Loans in ===
No.	Pos.	Name	Country	Age	Loan club	Started	Ended	Start source	End source
12	MF	Paul Gallagher	(Scotland)	42	Leicester City	5 July 2014	30 June 2015		
27	FW	Callum Robinson	(England)	31	Aston Villa	16 September 2014	18 October 2014		
10	FW	Jermaine Beckford	(Jamaica)	42	Bolton Wanderers	20 November 2014	30 June 2015		
29	FW	Bradley Fewster	(England)	30	Middlesbrough	27 November 2014	15 December 2014		
34	GK	Sam Johnstone	(England)	33	Manchester United	12 January 2015	30 June 2015		
27	FW	Callum Robinson	(England)	31	Aston Villa	2 February 2015	21 May 2015		

EU = if holds or not a European Union passport; Country: when 2 flags, 1st flag = country that plays for internationally, 2nd flag = country of birth; N = number on jersey; P = Position (for position name, pause mouse pointer on abbreviation); Name = Name on jersey (for more extensive name, pause mouse pointer on name); Age = age on the day of the signing; Moving from = only indicate the club the player was playing before start playing for this club in this season, for the type of the moving see Status column; Moving to = only indicates the club the player is going to play next, for the type of the moving see Status column; Ends = when the player's current contract ends; n/a = Not applicable; Apps = Total number of competitive appearances (including substitute appearances) at the club prior to departure; Goals = Total number of competitive goals scored at the club prior to departure.

=== Out ===
No.	Pos.	Name	Country	Age	Type	Moving to	Transfer window	Transfer fee	Apps	Goals	Source
29	FW	Chris Beardsley	(England)	30	Released	Stevenage	Summer	Free	22	3	
18	DF	Shane Cansdell-Sherriff	(Australia)	31	Released	Burton Albion	Summer	Free	15	1	
25	MF	Ryan Croasdale	(England)	19	Released	Sheffield Wednesday	Summer	Free	1	0	
15	FW	Graham Cummins	(Northern Ireland)	26	Released	Exeter City	Summer	Free	39	5	
27	FW	Iain Hume	(Canada)	30	Released	Kerala Blasters (India)	Summer	Free	89	27	
21	MF	John Mousinho	(England)	28	Released	Burton Albion	Summer	Free	30	1	
28	DF	Alex Nicholson	(England)	20	Released	Blyth Spartans	Summer	Free	1	0	
8	MF	Nicky Wroe	(England)	28	Released	Notts County	Summer	Free	44	11	
—	FW	Stuart Beavon	(England)	30	Transfer	Burton Albion	Summer	Undisclosed	58	9	
13	MF	Joel Byrom	(England)	28	Free transfer	Northampton Town	Winter	Free	33	4	
24	MF	Will Hayhurst	(Republic of Ireland)	20	Transfer	Notts County	Winter	Undisclosed	29	4	

EU = if holds or not a European Union passport; Country: when 2 flags, 1st flag = country that plays for internationally, 2nd flag = country of birth; N = number on jersey; P = Position (for position name, pause mouse pointer on abbreviation); Name = Name on jersey (for more extensive name, pause mouse pointer on name); Age = age on the day of the signing; Moving from = only indicate the club the player was playing before start playing for this club in this season, for the type of the moving see Status column; Moving to = only indicates the club the player is going to play next, for the type of the moving see Status column; Ends = when the player's current contract ends; n/a = Not applicable; Apps = Total number of competitive appearances (including substitute appearances) at the club prior to departure; Goals = Total number of competitive goals scored at the club prior to departure.

=== Loans out ===
No.	Pos.	Name	Country	Age	Loan club	Started	Ended	Start source	End source
—	FW	Stuart Beavon	(England)	30	Burton Albion	1 July 2014	1 September 2014		
32	FW	Jack Ryan	(England)	18	Stockport County	2 August 2014	2 November 2014		
13	MF	Joel Byrom	(England)	27	Northampton Town	21 August 2014	8 January 2015		
26	GK	Steven James	(England)	19	Nantwich Town	9 September 2014	9 October 2014		
2	DF	Keith Keane	(Republic of Ireland)	27	Crawley Town	9 September 2014	11 December 2014		
20	DF	Ben Davies	(England)	19	Tranmere Rovers	19 September 2014	22 October 2014		
32	DF	Nick Anderton	(England)	18	Gateshead	30 October 2014			
11	MF	Lee Holmes	(England)	27	Portsmouth	25 November 2014	3 January 2015		
1	GK	Jamie Jones	(England)	25	Coventry City	23 January 2015	23 February 2015		
25	FW	Jordan Hugill	(England)	22	Tranmere Rovers	26 February 2015	26 March 2015		
1	GK	Jamie Jones	(England)	26	Rochdale	26 February 2015	30 June 2015		
2	MF	Keith Keane	(Republic of Ireland)	28	Stevenage	5 March 2015	1 April 2015		
11	MF	Lee Holmes	(England)	27	Exeter City	16 March 2015	30 June 2015		
25	FW	Jordan Hugill	(England)	22	Hartlepool United	26 March 2015	23 May 2015		

EU = if holds or not a European Union passport; Country: when 2 flags, 1st flag = country that plays for internationally, 2nd flag = country of birth; N = number on jersey; P = Position (for position name, pause mouse pointer on abbreviation); Name = Name on jersey (for more extensive name, pause mouse pointer on name); Age = age on the day of the signing; Moving from = only indicate the club the player was playing before start playing for this club in this season, for the type of the moving see Status column; Moving to = only indicates the club the player is going to play next, for the type of the moving see Status column; Ends = when the player's current contract ends; n/a = Not applicable; Apps = Total number of competitive appearances (including substitute appearances) at the club prior to departure; Goals = Total number of competitive goals scored at the club prior to departure.

== Match details ==
=== Pre-season ===
15 July 2014 Jack Kirkland Trophy	Chorley	2–3	Preston North End	Chorley
19:00 BST	Hine 16'; Stephenson 35'	Report	Laird 42'; Garner 48'; Little 65'	Stadium: Victory Park; Attendance: 1,437; Referee: Mr B Toner

19 July 2014	Preston North End	1–2	Liverpool	Preston
15:00 BST	Brownhill 45+1'	Report	Suso 75'; Peterson 78'	Stadium: Deepdale; Attendance: 17,488 (4,950 away fans); Referee: Jeremy Simpson

23 July 2014	FC Halifax Town	1–2	Preston North End	Halifax
19:45 BST	Dyer 44'	Report	Gallagher 28'; Browne 37'	Stadium: The Shay; Attendance: 813; Referee: Seb Stockbridge

25 July 2014	Morecambe	1–2	Preston North End	Morecambe
19:30 BST	Williams 63'	Report	Garner 19'; Keane 82'	Stadium: Globe Arena; Attendance: 1,364 (490 away fans); Referee: Ross Joyce

29 July 2014	Preston North End	2–1	Burnley	Preston
19:45 BST	Browne 51'; Brownhill 90'	Report	Jutkiewicz 15'	Stadium: Deepdale; Attendance: 5,457 (1,881 away fans); Referee: Peter Bankes

2 August 2014	Preston North End	1–1	Leicester City	Preston
15:00 BST	Clarke 58'	Report	Moore 25'	Stadium: Deepdale; Attendance: 3,693 (386 away fans); Referee: Darren Handley

=== League One ===
==== League table ====
Pos	Team	Pld	W	D	L	GF	GA	GD	Pts	Promotion, qualification or relegation
1	Bristol City (C, P)	46	29	12	5	96	38	+58	99	Promotion to Football League Championship
2	Milton Keynes Dons (P)	46	27	10	9	101	44	+57	91	Promotion to Football League Championship
3	Preston North End (O, P)	46	25	14	7	79	40	+39	89	Qualification for League One play-offs (Note: Four teams play for one spot and promotion to Football League Championship.)
4	Swindon Town	46	23	10	13	76	57	+19	79	Qualification for League One play-offs
5	Sheffield United	46	19	14	13	66	53	+13	71	Qualification for League One play-offs

Updated to match(es) played on 3 May 2015. Source: BBC Sport
Rules for classification: 1) Points; 2) Goal difference; 3) Number of goals scored
(C) Champions; (O) Play-off winners; (P) Promoted

==== Matches ====
9 August 2014 1	Preston North End	1–1	Notts County	Preston
15:00	Garner 89'	BBC Report	52' Cassidy	Stadium: Deepdale; Attendance: 12,857; Referee: David Webb

16 August 2014 2	Scunthorpe United	0–4	Preston North End	Scunthorpe
15:00		BBC Report	17', 82' Garner; 39' (o.g.) Llera; 48' Humphrey	Stadium: Glanford Park; Attendance: 4,013; Referee: Andrew Madley

19 August 2014 3	Doncaster Rovers	1–1	Preston North End	Doncaster
19:45	Tyson 90'	BBC Report	66' Humphrey	Stadium: Keepmoat Stadium; Attendance: 6,513; Referee: Gary Sutton

23 August 2014 4	Preston North End	1–0	Oldham Athletic	Preston
15:00	King 4'	Report		Stadium: Deepdale; Attendance: 11,678; Referee: Scott Duncan

30 August 2014 5	Preston North End	1–1	Sheffield United	Preston
15:00	Little 11'	Report	Baxter 41'	Stadium: Deepdale; Attendance: 11,058; Referee: Seb Stockbridge

13 September 2014 6	Walsall	3–1	Preston North End	Walsall
15:00	Sawyers 7'; Bradshaw 49'; Downing 76'	Report	Garner 36'; Hugill (red card) 69'	Stadium: Bescot Stadium; Attendance: 4,776 (1,122 away fans); Referee: Geoff Eltringham

16 September 2014 7	Preston North End	3–3	Chesterfield	Preston
19:45	Browne 7'; Garner 15'; Brownhill 28'	Report	Doyle 31', 79', 90+1' (pen.)	Stadium: Deepdale; Attendance: 8,399 (433 away fans); Referee: Nigel Miller

20 September 2014 8	Preston North End	2–0	Crawley Town	Preston
15:00	Wright 23'; Garner 65' (pen.)	Report		Stadium: Deepdale; Attendance: 10,388 (84 away fans); Referee: Kevin Wright

27 September 2014 9	Coventry City	0–2	Preston North End	Coventry
15:00	Swanson (yellow card) 11'; Haynes (yellow card) 61'; Hines (yellow card) 76'; Coulibaly (yellow card) 79'	Report	Clarke 62'; Garner 67' (pen.); Wiseman (yellow card) 85'	Stadium: Ricoh Arena; Attendance: 10,006 (783 away fans); Referee: Tim Robinson

4 October 2014 10	Preston North End	4–2	Colchester United	Preston
15:00	Wiseman 21'; Browne 25'; Gallagher 47'; Humphrey 57'	Report	Healey 16'; Gilbey 37'; Eastman (yellow card) 43'; Kent (yellow card) 79'	Stadium: Deepdale; Attendance: 8,478 (133 away fans); Referee: Steve Martin

18 October 2014 11	Preston North End	2–0	Port Vale	Preston
15:00	Gallagher 42'; Garner (yellow card) 56'; Browne 81'	Report	Pope (yellow card) 45+2'; Duffy (yellow card) 63'; Zubar (red card) 79'	Stadium: Deepdale; Attendance: 9,381; Referee: Mick Russell

21 October 2014 12	Gillingham	0–1	Preston North End	Gillingham
19:45	Egan (yellow card) 90'	Report	Gallagher 59'; Buchanan (yellow card) 71'	Stadium: MEMS Priestfield Stadium; Attendance: 4,632; Referee: James Linington

25 October 2014 13	Preston North End	3–2	Fleetwood Town	Preston
15:00	Garner 60', 63', 79'	Report	Jordan 1'; Laird 7' (o.g.); Maxwell (yellow card) 62'; Proctor (yellow card) 65'; Pond (yellow card) 80'	Stadium: Deepdale; Attendance: 13,280; Referee: Eddie Ilderton

28 October 2014 14	Leyton Orient	0–2	Preston North End	London
19:45	Lowry (yellow card) 38'; Cuthbert (yellow card) 42'; Bartley (yellow card) 86'; Cox (yellow card) 90+1'	BBC Report	Buchanan (yellow card) 12'; Robinson 19'; Davies (yellow card) 57'; Huntington 75'	Stadium: Matchroom Stadium; Attendance: 4,650; Referee: Carl Berry

1 November 2014 15	Rochdale	3–0	Preston North End	Rochdale
15:00	O'Connell 28' (yellow card) 42'; Henderson 32'; Bennett (yellow card) 60'; Done 61'	BBC Report	(yellow card) 28' Welsh; (yellow card) 39' Huntington	Stadium: Spotland Stadium; Attendance: 6,102; Referee: Paul Tierney

4 November 2014 16	Swindon Town	1–0	Preston North End	County Ground, Swindon
19:45	Stephens (yellow card) 74'; Williams 84'; Gladwin (yellow card) 90+3'	Report	Kilkenny (yellow card) 64'	Attendance: 6,646; Referee: Oliver Langford

15 November 2014 17	Preston North End	1–2	Bradford City	Preston
15:00	Garner 85'	BBC Report	McArdle 26'; Yeates 86'	Stadium: Deepdale; Attendance: 10,302; Referee: Andy Haines

22 November 2014 18	Bristol City	0–1	Preston North End	Bristol
15:00		Report	Robinson 28'	Stadium: Ashton Gate; Attendance: 13,245; Referee: Roger East

29 November 2014 19	Yeovil Town	0–2	Preston North End	Yeovil
15:00	Inniss (red card) 63'	Report	Huntington 5'; Clarke (yellow card) 40'; Welsh (yellow card) 52'; Gallagher 90'	Stadium: Huish Park; Attendance: 4,343; Referee: Darren Deadman

13 December 2014 20	Preston North End	1–1	Milton Keynes Dons	Preston
15:00	Wiseman (yellow card) 63' (goal) 68'	Report	Baker 39'; McFadzean (yellow card) 69'; Spence (yellow card) 76'	Stadium: Deepdale; Attendance: 9,856; Referee: David Coote

20 December 2014 21	Peterborough United	0–1	Preston North End	Peterborough
15:00	McLean (yellow card) 49'; Bostwick (yellow card) 69'	Report	Beckford (yellow card) 44' (goal) 45+1'; Browne (yellow card) 64'; Little (yellow card) 90+3'	Stadium: London Road Stadium; Attendance: 6,803; Referee: Darren Sheldrake

26 December 2014 22	Preston North End	1–0	Barnsley	Preston
15:00	Gallagher 16' (pen.) (yellow card) 31'; Welsh (yellow card) 87'	Report	Berry (yellow card) 75'; Holgate (yellow card) 86'	Stadium: Deepdale; Attendance: 13,793; Referee: Paul Tierney

28 December 2014 23	Crewe Alexandra	1–1	Preston North End	Crewe
15:00	Cooper 81'	Report	Beckford 83'	Stadium: Gresty Road; Attendance: 6,429; Referee: Seb Stockbridge

10 January 2015 24	Sheffield United	2–1	Preston North End	Sheffield
15:00	McNulty 52'; Campbell-Ryce 70'; Doyle (yellow card) 74'	Report	Kilkenny (yellow card) 38'; Beckford (yellow card) 51'; Clarke (yellow card) 58'; Huntington (yellow card) 66'; Brownhill 90+2'	Stadium: Bramall Lane; Attendance: 19,902; Referee: Pat Miller

16 January 2015 25	Preston North End	2–2	Leyton Orient	Preston
19:45	Beckford 22'; Laird (yellow card) 60'; Gallagher 68' (pen.)	Report	Mooney 5' (yellow card) 53'; Dagnall 78'	Stadium: Deepdale; Attendance: 8,555; Referee: Scott Duncan

20 January 2015 25	Preston North End	1–1	Yeovil Town	Preston
19:45	Ebanks-Blake 76'	Report	Ugwu 45+2'; Moore (yellow card) 83'; Smith (yellow card) 90+4'	Stadium: Deepdale; Attendance: 7,491; Referee: Chris Sarginson

31 January 2015 26	Crawley Town	2–1	Preston North End	Crawley
15:00	Wordsworth 18'; Smith (yellow card) 59'; Fowler 87'	Report	Huntington 56'; Woods (yellow card) 75'	Stadium: Broadfield Stadium; Attendance: 2,550; Referee: James Adcock

7 February 2015 27	Preston North End	1–0	Coventry City	Preston
15:00	Davies 21'	Report		Stadium: Deepdale; Attendance: 13,363; Referee: Mark Brown

10 February 2015 28	Chesterfield	0–2	Preston North End	Chesterfield
19:45	Hird (red card) 3'; Ryan (yellow card) 43'; O'Shea (yellow card) 90'	Report	Johnson (yellow card) 23'; Garner 30', 79'; Gallagher (yellow card) 90+3'	Stadium: Proact Stadium; Attendance: 6,309; Referee: Peter Bankes

21 February 2015 30	Preston North End	2–0	Scunthorpe United	Preston
15:00 GMT	Johnson 57'; Gallagher 71'; Garner (yellow card) 81'	Report	McSheffrey (yellow card) 65'; Clarke (yellow card) 73'	Stadium: Deepdale; Attendance: 9,415; Referee: Kevin Wright

24 February 2015 31	Preston North End	1–0	Walsall	Preston
19:45 GMT	Johnson 18'	Report		Stadium: Deepdale; Attendance: 7,779; Referee: Darren Drysdale

28 February 2015 32	Oldham Athletic	0–4	Preston North End	Oldham
15:00 GMT		BBC Report	2' Huntington, 32' Johnson; 52' Garner; 82' Beckford	Stadium: Boundary Park; Attendance: 5,935; Referee: Mark Haywood

3 March 2015 33	Preston North End	2–2	Doncaster Rovers	Preston
19:45 GMT	Johnson 13'; Beckford 90'	BBC Report	81' Forrester; 84' Main	Stadium: Deepdale; Attendance: 8,703; Referee: Dean Whitestone

7 March 2015 34	MK Dons	0–2	Preston North End	Milton Keynes
15:00 GMT		BBC Report	66' Robinson; 70' Garner	Stadium: Stadium mk Attendance: 10,618; Referee: Lee Probert

14 March 2015 35	Preston North End	5–1	Crewe Alexandra	Preston
15:00 GMT	Garner 11', 24', 72', 79'; Beckford 82'	BBC Report	34' Turton	Stadium: Deepdale; Attendance: 10,203; Referee: Chris Kavanagh

17 March 2015 36	Preston North End	2–0	Peterborough United	Preston
19:45 GMT	Johnson 37'; Beckford 87'	BBC Report		Stadium: Deepdale; Attendance: 8,856; Referee: Geoff Eltringham

21 March 2015 37	Barnsley	1–1	Preston North End	Barnsley
15:00 GMT	Ibehre 79'	BBC Report	37' Garner	Stadium: Oakwell; Attendance: 12,471; Referee: Eddie Ilderton

29 March 2015 38	Fleetwood Town	1–1	Preston North End	Highbury Stadium, Fleetwood
19:45 BST	Ball 85'	BBC Report	9' Johnson	Attendance: 5,110; Referee: Andy Madley

3 April 2015 39	Preston North End	1–0	Rochdale	Preston
15:00 BST	Beckford 36'	BBC Report		Stadium: Deepdale; Attendance: 12,288; Referee: Andy Woolmer

6 April 2015 40	Bradford City	0–3	Preston North End	Bradford
15:00 BST		BBC Report	47' Gallagher; 53' Johnson; 80' Humphrey	Stadium: Valley Parade; Attendance: 16,032; Referee: Mark Heywood

11 April 2015 41	Preston North End	1–1	Bristol City	Preston
15:00 BST	Beckford 59'	BBC Report	63' Wilbraham	Stadium: Deepdale; Attendance: 16,441; Referee: Bobby Madley

14 April 2015 42	Preston North End	2–2	Gillingham	Preston
19:45 BST	Beckford 36'; Robinson 45'	BBC Report	58' McGlashan; 90' Legge	Stadium: Deepdale; Attendance: 9,417; Referee: David Coote

17 April 2015 43	Port Vale	2–2	Preston North End	Stoke-on-Trent
15:00 BST	O'Connor 52' (pen.), 85' (pen.); Duffy (red card) 58'	BBC Report	12' Johnson; 59' (pen.)	Stadium: Vale Park; Attendance: 7,210; Referee: Richard Clark

21 April 2015 44	Notts County	1–3	Preston North End	Nottingham
19:45 BST	Spencer 72'	BBC Report	23', 85' Beckford; 31' Garner	Stadium: Meadow Lane; Attendance: 4,769; Referee: Carl Boyeson

25 April 2015 45	Preston North End	3–0	Swindon Town	Preston
15:00 BST	Garner 2', 45', 51'	BBC Report		Stadium: Deepdale; Attendance: 17,621; Referee: Gary Sutton

2 May 2015 46	Colchester United	1–0	Preston North End	Colchester
15:00 BST	Moncur 82'	BBC Report		Stadium: Colchester Community Stadium; Attendance: 8,413; Referee: Keith Stroud

=== Play-offs ===
7 May 2015 Semi-final 1st leg	Chesterfield	0–1	Preston North End	Chesterfield
15:00 BST		BBC Report	6' Beckford	Stadium: Proact Stadium; Attendance: 8,409; Referee: Mark Haywood

10 May 2015 Semi-final 2nd leg	Preston North End	3–0	Chesterfield	Preston
19:45 BST	Beckford 38', 87'; Garner 62' (pen.)	BBC Report		Stadium: Deepdale; Attendance: 15,641; Referee: Andy D'Urso

24 May 2015 Final	Preston North End	4–0	Swindon Town	London
17:30 BST	Beckford 3', 44', 58'; Huntington 13'	BBC Report	(yellow card) 54' Kasim	Stadium: Wembley Stadium; Attendance: 48,236; Referee: Andy Madley

=== FA Cup ===
10 November 2014 First round	Havant & Waterlooville	0–3	Preston North End	West Leigh Park, Havant
20:00	Stock (yellow card) 34' (yellow-red card); Cummings (red card) 80'	Report	Robinson 7', 30', 81' (pen.)	Attendance: 2,382; Referee: Steve Martin

6 December 2014 Second round	Preston North End	1–0	Shrewsbury Town	Preston
15:00	Huntington 19'; Beckford (yellow card) 90+2'	Report		Stadium: Deepdale; Attendance: 6,011; Referee: David Webb

3 January 2015 Third round	Preston North End	2–0	Norwich City	Preston
15:00	Gallagher 71', 84'; King (yellow card) 76'	Report	Bennett (yellow card) 74'	Stadium: Deepdale; Attendance: 9,807; Referee: Stuart Attwell

24 January 2015 Fourth round	Preston North End	1–1	Sheffield United	Deepdale, Preston
15:00	Gallagher 19' (yellow card) 90+3'	Report	Kennedy (yellow card) 67'; De Girolamo 68'; Baxter (yellow card) 81'; Reed (yellow card) 89'	Attendance: 10,770; Referee: Keith Stroud

3 February 2015 Replay	Sheffield United	1–3	Preston North End	Bramall Lane, Sheffield
19:45	Murphy 38'; McNulty (yellow card) 51'	Report	Gallagher (yellow card) 48' (goal) 63', 73' (pen.); Huntington 69' (yellow card) 70'	Attendance: 13,161; Referee: Lee Probert

16 February 2015 Fifth round	Preston North End	1–3	Manchester United	Deepdale, Preston
19:45	Davies (yellow card) 39'; Laird 47' (yellow card) 48'; Kilkenny (yellow card) 67'; Stuckmann (yellow card) 87'	Report	Herrera 65'; Rojo (yellow card) 69'; Fellaini 72'; Rooney 88' (pen.)	Attendance: 21,348; Referee: Phil Dowd

=== League Cup ===
12 August 2014 Round One	Rochdale	0–2	Preston North End	Rochdale
19:45		BBC Report	43' Little; 48' Kilkenny	Stadium: Spotland Stadium; Attendance: 2,348; Referee: Mark Brown

26 August 2014 Round Two	Middlesbrough	3–1	Preston North End	Middlesbrough
19:45	Tomlin 51', 66'; Fewster 57'	Report	54' Hugill	Stadium: Riverside Stadium; Attendance: 10,727; Referee: Mark Haywood

=== Football League Trophy ===
2 September 2014 Round One	Preston North End	1–0	Shrewsbury Town	Preston
19:45	Hugill 59'	Report		Stadium: Deepdale; Attendance: 4,029 (196 away fans); Referee: Chris Kavanagh

7 October 2014 Round Two	Preston North End	3–2	Port Vale	Preston
19:45	Humphrey 13'; Gallagher (yellow card) 42' (goal) 69'; Garner 63' (yellow card) 78'	Report	Zubar (yellow card) 29'; Pope 51', 89'; Dickinson (yellow card) 64'; Brown (yellow card) 80'	Stadium: Deepdale; Attendance: 3,836 (286 away fans); Referee: Peter Bankes

25 November 2014 Round Three	Oldham Athletic	2–2 (9–10 p)	Preston North End	Oldham
19:45	Poleon 46'; Philliskirk 59'; Dieng (yellow card) 79'	Report	Laird 32'; Clarke (yellow card) 68' (goal) 80'	Stadium: Boundary Park; Attendance: 3,056; Referee: Tony Harrington
	Penalties
	Philliskirk (penalty scored); Kelly (penalty scored); Jones (penalty missed); Forte (penalty scored); Kusunga (penalty scored); Poleon (penalty scored); Mills (penalty scored); Wilson (penalty scored); Dieng (penalty scored); Wilson (penalty scored); Etheridge (penalty missed)		Laird (penalty scored); Davies (penalty missed); Kilkenny (penalty scored); Hayhurst (penalty scored); Beckford (penalty scored); Welsh (penalty scored); Reid (penalty scored); Buchanan (penalty scored); Wiseman (penalty scored); Huntington (penalty scored); Stuckmann (penalty scored)

16 December 2014 Area S-Final	Notts County	0–1	Preston North End	Meadow Lane, Nottingham
19:45 GMT	Smith (yellow card) 35'; Thompson (yellow card) 74'; Hall (yellow card) 86'	Report	Huntington 20'; Little (yellow card) 90+1'	Attendance: 2,058; Referee: Phil Gibbs

7 January 2015 Area Final L1	Preston North End	0–2	Walsall	Deepdale, Preston
19:45 GMT	Kilkenny (yellow card) 84'	Report	O'Connor (yellow card) 66'; Forde 84'; Bradshaw 88'	Attendance: 8,561; Referee: Simon Hooper

27 January 2015 Area Final L2	Walsall	0–0 (2–0 agg.)	Preston North End	Bescot Stadium, Walsall
19:45 GMT	A. Chambers (yellow card) 56'; O'Donnell (yellow card) 71'; Cain (yellow card) 72'	Report	Clarke (yellow card) 64'	Attendance: 10,038; Referee: Nigel Miller

== Overall summary ==
=== Summary ===
Games played	63 (46 League One, 6 FA Cup, 2 League Cup, 6 League Trophy, 3 Play-offs)
Games won	36 (25 League One, 4 FA Cup, 1 League Cup, 3 League Trophy, 3 Play-offs)
Games drawn	16 (14 League One, 1 FA Cup, 0 League Cup, '''2'''''' League Trophy, Play-offs)
Games lost	10 (7 League One, 1 FA Cup, 1 League Cup, 1 League Trophy, Play-offs)
Goals scored	84 (79 League One, 8 FA Cup, 3 League Cup, 10 League Trophy, 8 Play-offs)
Goals conceded	56 (40 League One, 5 FA Cup, 3 League Cup, 6 League Trophy, 0 Play-offs)
Goal difference	+28
Clean sheets	30 (20 League One, 3 FA Cup, 1 League Cup, 3 League Trophy, 3 Play-offs)
Yellow cards	91 (70 League One, 8 FA Cup, 2 League Cup, 7 League Trophy, 4 Play-offs)
Red cards	1 (1 League One, 0 FA Cup, 0 League Cup, 0 League Trophy)
Worst discipline	Joe Garner (11 (yellow card) , 0 (red card) )
Best result	W 5–1 vs Crewe Alexandra (15 Mar 15)
Worst result	L 0–3 vs Rochdale (1 Nov 14)
Most appearances	(England) Tom Clarke (45 (1) (Jamaica) Chris Humphrey (34 (12) (Scotland) Paul Gallagher (45 (1)
Top scorer	(England) Joe Garner (27)
Points	89

=== Score overview ===
Opposition	Home score	Away score	Double
Barnsley	1–0	1–1	No
Bradford City	1–2	3–0	No
Bristol City	1–1	1–0	No
Chesterfield	3–3	2–0	No
Colchester United	4–2	0–1	No
Coventry City	1–0	2–0	Yes
Crawley Town	2–0	1–2	No
Crewe Alexandra	5–1	1–1	No
Doncaster Rovers	2–2	1–1	No
Fleetwood Town	3–2	1–1	No
Gillingham	2–2	1–0	No
Leyton Orient	2–2	2–0	No
Milton Keynes Dons	1–1	2–0	No
Notts County	0–0	3–1	No
Oldham Athletic	1–0	4–0	Yes
Peterborough United	2–0	1–0	Yes
Port Vale	2–0	2–2	No
Rochdale	1–0	0–3	No
Scunthorpe United	2–0	4–0	Yes
Sheffield United	1–1	1–2	No
Swindon Town	3–0	0–1	No
Walsall	1–0	1–3	No
Yeovil Town	1–1	2–0	No

== Club staff ==
Position	Name
Manager	Simon Grayson
Assistant manager	Glynn Snodin
First team coach	John Dreyer
Goalkeeping coach	Alan Kelly, Jr.
Physio	Matt Jackson
