= Jack King (footballer, born 1985) =

English association football player

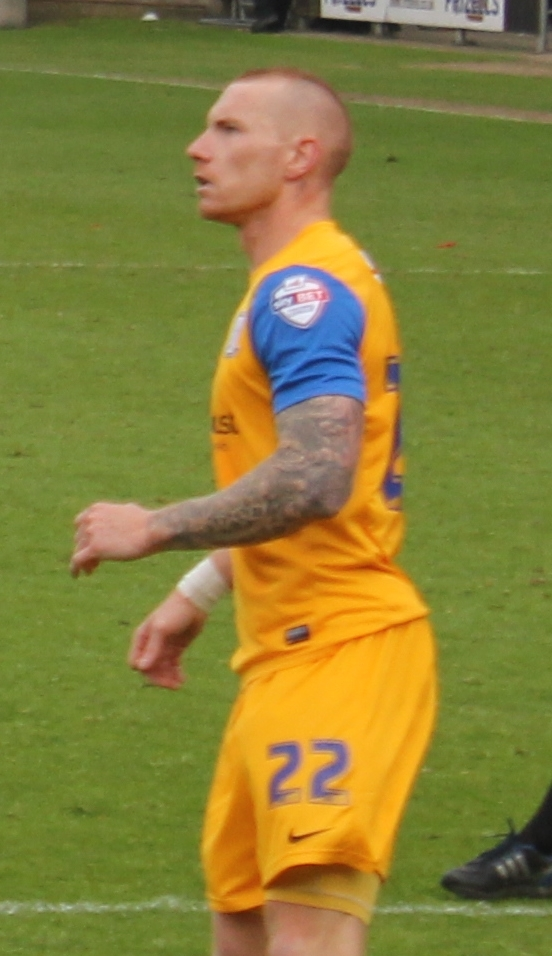
- King playing for Preston North End in 2014

Personal information
- Full name: Jack Andrew King
- Date of birth: 20 August 1985 (age 41)
- Place of birth: Oxford, England
- Height: 6 ft 0 in (1.83 m)
- Positions: Defender; midfielder

Youth career
- 1998–1999: Oxford United
- 1999–2004: Swansea City

Senior career*
Years	Team	Apps	(Gls)
2004	Didcot Town	13	(2)
2004–2005	Brackley Town	34	(6)
2005–2009	Didcot Town		
2009–2011	Farnborough	82	(19)
2011–2012	Woking	37	(8)
2012–2015	Preston North End	78	(7)
2015–2017	Scunthorpe United	36	(1)
2016–2017	→ Stevenage (loan)	20	(1)
2017–2018	Stevenage	48	(2)
2018–2020	Ebbsfleet United	68	(3)
Total		416	(49)
- * Club domestic league appearances and goals

Jack Andrew King (born 20 August 1985) is an English former professional footballer who played as a defender and midfielder.

After spells in the youth academies of Oxford United and Swansea City, King began his senior career at Didcot Town in 2004. He joined Brackley Town in August 2004 before returning to Didcot the following year, spending four further seasons at the club. He signed for Farnborough ahead of the 2009–10 season, scoring 21 goals in 108 appearances across two years and helping the club secure promotion to the Conference South. He moved to Woking in June 2011, winning the Conference South title during his one season there.

A move into full-time professional football followed when he joined League One club Preston North End in July 2012. He made 102 appearances across three seasons at Preston, culminating in promotion to the Championship in the 2014–15 season. King subsequently signed for Scunthorpe United in the summer of 2015 before moving to League Two club Stevenage on loan in August 2016, with the move made permanent in January 2017. Released by Stevenage in May 2018, King signed for Ebbsfleet United of the National League the following month, where he spent two years before retiring in May 2020 to return to full-time work as a builder.

== Career ==
=== Early career ===
King began his youth career at Oxford United's School of Excellence, where he remained until he was 13. He then joined Swansea City's academy, initially training locally to where he lived due to travel constraints. After two years, he relocated to Swansea on a permanent basis upon receiving an academy scholarship at the age of 15. King spent three years at Swansea, although he was not offered a professional contract. On not being offered a deal, he stated: "It was disappointing. I sort of knew in the end. I got a knee injury when I was 18 and going into my third year. So it was no real surprise. I felt I was good enough at the time and will still always think that".

After leaving Swansea in January 2004, King was scheduled to train with Bristol Rovers for the remainder of the 2003–04 season. However, upon arriving in Bristol, he was unable to obtain international clearance from the Football Association of Wales, which meant he was ineligible to play professional football until the end of the season.

=== Non-League ===
Due to being unable to play professionally, King began working as a groundworker for his father's building company while playing semi-professional football for local club Didcot Town of the Hellenic Premier Division. After spending the remainder of the 2003–04 season at Didcot, King joined Brackley Town in August 2004. He returned to Didcot in November 2005, three months into the following season, and helped the club win the Hellenic Premier Division, earning promotion to the Southern Football League. He continued to play regularly for Didcot for several seasons whilst still working for his father's business, stating that he received offers to play in the Football League. However, these offers did not appeal to him, as he was progressing well in non-League. He scored nearly 40 goals in over 150 appearances across his two spells at Didcot.

King left Didcot and joined Southern Premier Division club Farnborough on a two-year part-time contract ahead of the 2009–10 season. He played regularly during his two seasons at Farnborough, helping the club win the Southern Premier Division title in his first year and finish as runners-up in the Conference South in his second. He scored 21 goals in 106 appearances in all competitions over the two seasons. King opted to leave the club ahead of the 2011–12 season after Farnborough decided to go full-time. King stated playing full-time football did not appeal to him, despite "more and more interest coming in", as he continued to work for his family's business and therefore considered full-time football "not an option". He subsequently signed a one-year part-time contract with fellow Conference South club Woking in June 2011. He spent one season at Woking, scoring 12 times in 44 appearances as the club won the Conference South title and secured promotion to the Conference National.

=== Preston North End ===
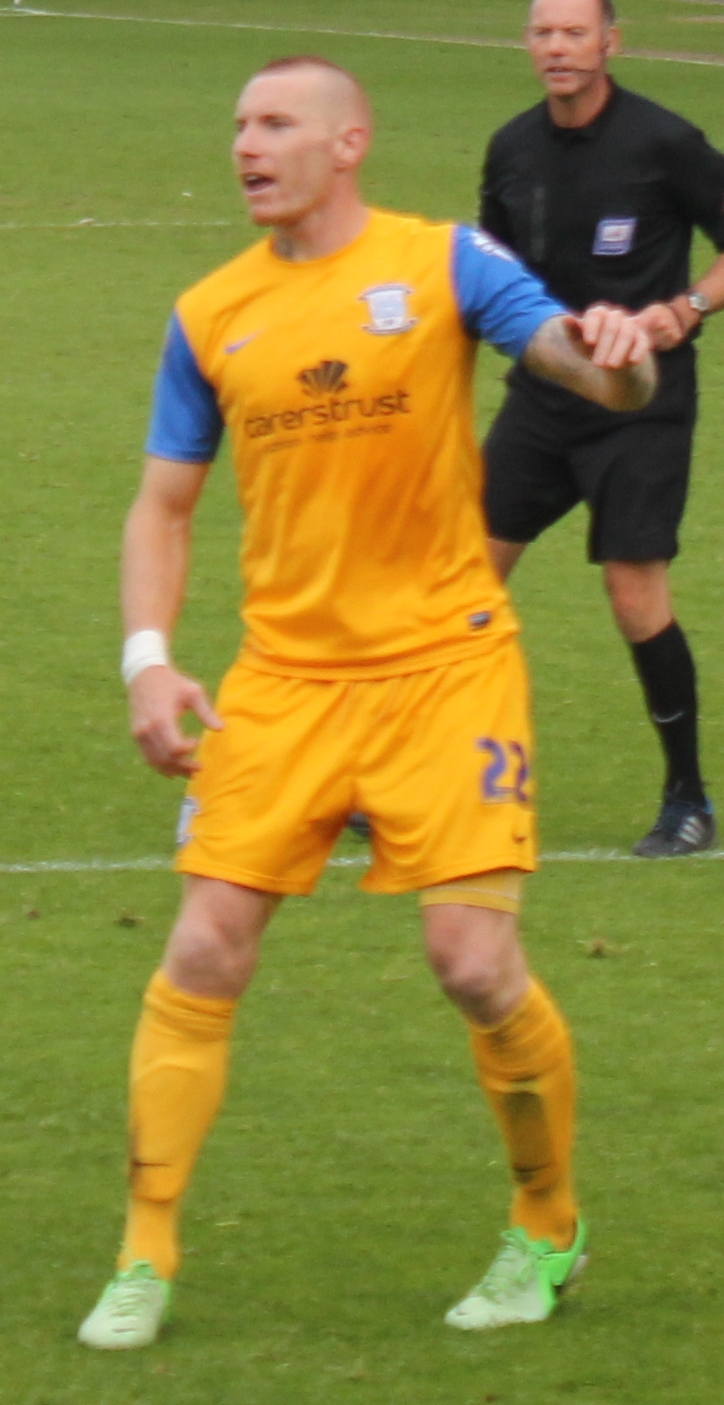
King playing for Preston North End in 2014

King experienced full-time professional football for the first time when he signed a one-year contract with League One club Preston North End in July 2012. Preston manager Graham Westley had previously scouted King several times during his tenure at Stevenage, but felt he was too similar in style to Michael Bostwick, and therefore a move did not materialise at the time. King made his debut for Preston in a 2–0 victory against Huddersfield Town in the League Cup on 13 August 2012, scoring the opening goal with a header. He scored three goals in four games early in the season: league goals against Hartlepool United and Doncaster Rovers, and one in a 3–1 League Cup defeat to Middlesbrough at Deepdale. King remained a regular under new manager Simon Grayson, making 47 appearances across the 2012–13 season, scoring seven goals, as Preston finished 14th in League One.

Ahead of the 2013–14 season, King was utilised at right-back, in central midfield, and as a striker during pre-season friendlies, with Grayson planning to make use of his versatility throughout the season. He played in the club's opening match of the season, a 1–0 victory against rivals Blackpool in the League Cup on 5 August 2013. Following the match, it was revealed that King had sustained a stress fracture in his foot and would not be available for selection for two months. He returned to the first team in November 2013, and scored his first goal of the season, a header, in a 1–0 victory against Bristol City on 30 November 2013, securing Preston's first home win in two months. In December 2013, he signed a contract extension keeping him at the club until the summer of 2015. He made 29 appearances during the season, the majority of which were in central defence, including both legs of the League One play-off semi-final, in which Preston were defeated 4–2 on aggregate by Rotherham United at the semi-final stage.

He remained at Preston for the 2014–15 season, making his first appearance as a substitute in a 4–0 away victory against Scunthorpe United on 16 August 2014. King went on to make 28 appearances in all competitions as Preston achieved promotion to the Championship via the League One play-offs. King was released by the club shortly after the season concluded. He made 102 appearances and scored 10 goals during his three years at Preston.

=== Scunthorpe United ===
Following his departure from Preston, King signed a two-year contract with League One club Scunthorpe United on a free transfer on 26 May 2015. He was made vice-captain ahead of the start of the season, behind club captain Stephen Dawson, although ultimately went on to captain the team for the majority of the first half of the season due to Dawson sustaining an injury. King debuted for Scunthorpe on the opening day of the 2015–16 season in a 2–1 defeat to newly promoted Burton Albion. He scored his first goal for the club in a 1–1 draw with Port Vale on 12 December 2015. He followed this up by scoring again three days later in Scunthorpe's 3–0 home victory against Leyton Orient in an FA Cup second round replay, with the victory setting up an away tie with Premier League club Chelsea in January 2016, a match in which King also featured. Although a regular starter in the first half of the season, King increasingly appeared from the substitutes' bench during the latter half. He made 42 appearances in all competitions that season, scoring two goals.

=== Stevenage ===
Having made no appearances for Scunthorpe in the opening weeks of the 2016–17 season, King joined League Two club Stevenage on 30 August 2016, on a loan agreement until January 2017. He made his debut for Stevenage the same day his signing was announced, playing the full match in a 3–1 away defeat to Leyton Orient in the EFL Trophy. King scored his first goal for the club on 10 September 2016, doubling Stevenage's lead from close range from a Matt Godden cross in a 2–1 victory against Crawley Town. He made 23 appearances in all competitions during the loan spell before returning to Scunthorpe upon its expiry on 9 January 2017.

King signed for Stevenage on an 18-month permanent deal on 31 January 2017, joining on a free transfer. He made 39 appearances for the club in all competitions during his first season, as Stevenage missed out on a play-off place following a 10th-place finish. In the 2017–18 season, King made 37 appearances across all competitions, with Stevenage ending the League Two season in 16th position. He was released following the expiry of his contract in May 2018.

=== Ebbsfleet United ===
Following his departure from Stevenage, King signed for National League club Ebbsfleet United on a free transfer on 27 June 2018. He made his Ebbsfleet debut in the club's opening match of the 2018–19 season, playing the full 90 minutes in a 1–0 defeat to Chesterfield at Stonebridge Road on 4 August 2018. King started in the club's first 11 games of the season, before being left out of the team by manager Daryl McMahon following a 4–1 away defeat to Wrexham on 15 September 2018. He did not play again under McMahon, with King stating he felt the manager had "left him out in the cold" without an explanation for his omission. After McMahon was replaced by Garry Hill in November 2018, King returned to the squad, appearing in a 0–0 FA Cup draw with League Two club Cheltenham Town on 10 November 2018. He scored his first goal for Ebbsfleet in a 2–0 home victory over Leyton Orient on 19 January 2019. King played regularly in defence for the remainder of the season, making 36 appearances and scoring two goals.

King captained the team during the 2019–20 season, scoring once in 39 appearances before the season was curtailed by the COVID-19 pandemic in March 2020. He announced his retirement from professional football in May 2020 and returned to full-time work as a builder at his father's construction business.

== Style of play ==
Described as a "versatile" player for his deployment in multiple positions throughout his career, King began as a central midfielder, which he identified as his natural position during his youth and semi-professional development. King also stated that central midfield was his preferred position, citing his greater experience in the role.

During his time at Preston North End, King gained a reputation for his versatility, having played in five different positions within two months of joining the club. These included central defence, right-back, right-midfield, central midfield, and striker. On this, King stated: "Playing in different positions is something I see as adding another string to my bow, it can help develop my game". In 2012, he also revealed that his manager at Preston, Graham Westley, believed he was best suited to a long-term role in central defence. This proved accurate, as from 2014 onward, King was primarily deployed in that position.

== Career statistics ==
Appearances and goals by club, season and competition
Club	Season	League			FA Cup		League Cup		Other		Total	
Club	Season	Division	Apps	Goals	Apps	Goals	Apps	Goals	Apps	Goals	Apps	Goals
Didcot Town	2003–04	Hellenic League Premier Division	13	2	0	0	—		2 (Note: Appearances in Hellenic League Challenge Cup)	0	15	2
Brackley Town	2004–05	Southern League Division One West	26	4	0	0	—		0	0	26	4
Brackley Town	2005–06	Southern League Division One West	8	2	0	0	—		0	0	8	2
Brackley Town	Total		34	6	0	0	0	0	0	0	34	6
Didcot Town	2005–06	Hellenic League Premier Division	29	6	0	0	—		11 (Note: Five appearances and one goal in Hellenic League Challenge Cup; three appearances and one goal in FA Vase; three appearances and two goals in Berks & Bucks Senior Cup)	4	40	10
Didcot Town	2006–07	Southern League Division One South & West	Season statistics not known									
Didcot Town	2007–08	Southern League Division One South & West	Season statistics not known									
Didcot Town	2008–09	Southern League Division One South & West	Season statistics not known									
Farnborough	2009–10	Southern League Premier Division	41	8	6	1	—		7 (Note: Three appearances in Hampshire Senior Cup; two appearances in FA Trophy; two appearances in Southern League Cup)	0	54	9
Farnborough	2010–11	Conference South	41	11	4	1	—		9 (Note: Four appearances in Hampshire Senior Cup; one appearance in FA Trophy; one appearance in Southern League Championship match; three appearances in 2011 Conference South play-offs)	0	54	12
Farnborough	Total		82	19	10	2	0	0	16	0	108	21
Woking	2011–12	Conference South	37	8	2	3	—		5 (Note: Four appearances and one goal in Surrey Senior Cup; one appearance in FA Trophy)	1	44	12
Preston North End	2012–13	League One	36	4	3	0	2	2	4 (Note: Appearance(s) in EFL Trophy)	1	45	7
Preston North End	2013–14	League One	24	2	2	0	1	0	2 (Note: Appearances in 2014 League One play-offs)	0	29	2
Preston North End	2014–15	League One	18	1	3	0	1	0	6	0	28	1
Preston North End	Total		78	7	8	0	4	2	12	1	102	10
Scunthorpe United	2015–16	League One	36	1	4	1	1	0	1	0	42	2
Stevenage	2016–17 (Note: Part of this season was spent on loan from Scunthorpe United)	League Two	36	3	1	0	0	0	2	0	39	3
Stevenage	2017–18	League Two	32	0	4	0	0	0	1	0	37	0
Stevenage	Total		68	3	5	0	0	0	3	0	76	3
Ebbsfleet United	2018–19	National League	34	2	2	0	—		1 (Note: Appearance(s) in FA Trophy)	0	37	2
Ebbsfleet United	2019–20	National League	34	1	3	0	—		2	0	39	1
Ebbsfleet United	Total		68	3	5	0	0	0	3	0	76	3
Career total			445	55	34	6	5	2	53	6	537	69

== Honours ==
Didcot Town

- Hellenic Football League Premier Division: 2005–06
- Hellenic League Challenge Cup: 2003–04, 2005–06
- Berks & Bucks Senior Trophy: 2005–06

Farnborough

- Southern Football League Premier Division: 2009–10

Woking

- Conference South: 2011–12

Preston

- Football League One play-offs: 2014–15

Individual

- Conference South Team of the Year: 2011–12
