= 2013–14 Preston North End F.C. season =

English football club season

Preston North End
2013–14 season
- Manager: Simon Grayson
- Stadium: Deepdale
- League One: 5th
- FA Cup: Fourth round
- League Cup: Second round
- League Trophy: Second round
- Top goalscorer: League: Joe Garner (19, include 1 play-offs goal); All: Joe Garner (24)
- Highest home attendance: 17,470 vs Blackpool, League Cup, 5 August 2013
- Lowest home attendance: 5,217 vs Barnet, FA Cup, 9 November 2013)
Home colours	Away colours	Third colours

The 2013–14 season was Preston North End's 126th year in the Football League and their third consecutive season in the third division of English football, Football League One.

== Season overview ==
In Simon Grayson's first summer in charge, he permanently signed 4 players, Tom Clarke, a centreback, Chris Humphrey, a right winger, Kevin Davies, a Centre forward and Alex Nicholson, a right back. He also signed Declan Rudd on a season long loan from Norwich City. He allowed 3 players to leave during the summer, those being Luke Foster, Chris Robertson and Andrew Procter.

The 2013–14 season started off well, unbeaten in their first 9 league games. They also beat local rivals Blackpool in the League Cup, before being beaten by Lancashire rivals Burnley in the second round.

The 9 league game unbeaten run came to an end on 5 October, against Peterborough United, a 2–0 defeat and was followed up with another 2–0 defeat, against Crewe. Preston then went on another 9 game unbeaten league run, winning 5 and drawing 4, including a win against Leyton Orient, only their second league defeat of the season. The unbeaten run came to an end after a 3–0 home defeat to Brentford, but was followed up with 3 more consecutive wins, against Carlisle United, Shrewsbury Town and Port Vale.

Preston's FA Cup campaign started off successfully, with a 6–0 win over Barnet in the first round. That was followed up with a 1–0 over Wycombe Wanderers.

Preston's 2nd game of 2014 was against Wolves, which ended in a 2–0 defeat. In the FA Cup, Preston came up against Ipswich Town in the 3rd round of the FA Cup, drawing 1–1, before winning 3–2 in the replay. In the fourth round of the FA Cup, Preston were drawn against Nottingham Forest. They drew 0–0 before Preston lost 0–2 in the replay.

Following that loss, Preston then went onto a 12-game unbeaten run in the league, their 3rd of the season, which strengthened North End's position in the play off positions, placing them 17 points ahead of 7th placed M.K. Dons, with 27 points available. The unbeaten run was then lost after a 1–0 defeat by Swindon Town, but was followed up with two consecutive wins against Peterborough United and Crawley Town, which all but secured their play off place, being 18 points clear of M.K. Dons, with 18 points to play for. The next game was a 1–1 draw with Bristol City followed up with a 6–1 romp against Carlisle United.

Preston won two and lost two of their final four league games of the season. They lost 1–0 to Brentford Preston then went on to beat Shrewsbury Town and Gillingham, moving them up to 3rd place. The final game of the season was against Crewe, which they lost 2–1, meaning they ended the season in 5th place.

The result meant that Preston would face Rotherham United in the League One play-offs. The first leg ended in a 1–1 draw after top scorer Joe Garner produced a breathtaking equaliser for the home side. In the second leg, Preston took an early lead through Paul Gallagher, but went on to concede 3 goals; losing 3–1 on the night and 4–2 on aggregate.

== League One Data ==
=== League table ===
Pos	Team	Pld	W	D	L	GF	GA	GD	Pts	Promotion, qualification or relegation
3	Leyton Orient	46	25	11	10	85	45	+40	86	Qualification for League One play-offs (Note: Four teams play for one spot and promotion to Football League Championship.)
4	Rotherham United (O, P)	46	24	14	8	86	58	+28	86	Qualification for League One play-offs
5	Preston North End	46	23	16	7	72	46	+26	85	Qualification for League One play-offs
6	Peterborough United	46	23	5	18	72	58	+14	74	Qualification for League One play-offs
7	Sheffield United	46	18	13	15	48	46	+2	67	

Updated to match(es) played on 3 May 2014. Source: BBC Sport
Rules for classification: 1) Points; 2) Goal difference; 3) Number of goals scored
(O) Play-off winners; (P) Promoted

=== Result summary ===
Overall								Home						Away					
Pld	W	D	L	GF	GA	GD	Pts	W	D	L	GF	GA	GD	W	D	L	GF	GA	GD
46	23	16	7	72	46	+26	85	12	9	2	44	26	+18	11	7	5	28	20	+8

Last updated: 3 May 2014.

=== Result by round ===
Round	1	2	3	4	5	6	7	8	9	10	11	12	13	14	15	16	17	18	19	20	21	22	23	24	25	26	27	28	29	30	31	32	33	34	35	36	37	38	39	40	41	42	43	44	45	46
Ground	H	A	H	A	A	H	H	A	H	A	H	A	H	A	H	A	H	A	H	A	H	A	A	H	A	H	A	H	A	H	A	A	H	H	A	A	H	A	H	H	A	H	A	H	H	A
Result	D	D	D	D	W	W	W	W	W	L	L	W	D	W	D	W	D	W	W	D	L	W	W	W	L	D	D	W	W	D	D	W	D	W	W	D	D	L	W	W	D	W	L	W	W	L
Position	15	14	12	12	9	6	5	4	4	5	5	4	4	4	4	5	5	3	3	4	5	4	4	4	4	4	4	4	4	4	4	4	4	4	4	4	4	5	5	5	5	5	5	4	3	5

Updated to match(es) played on 3 May 2014. Source:
A = Away; H = Home; W = Win; D = Draw; L = Loss

== Kits ==
Supplier: Nike
Sponsor(s): Carer's Trust
The Football Pools (back of shirt)
The Space Centre (shorts)

Home	Away

Last updated: 10 July 2013.
Source: Preston North End FC Official Site

== Squad ==
No.	Name	Position (s)	Nationality	Place of Birth	Date of Birth (Age)	Club caps	Club goals	Int. caps	Int. goals	Date signed	Signed from	Fee	Contract End
Goalkeepers
1	Thorsten Stuckmann	GK	(Germany)	Gütersloh	17 March 1981 (age 45)	57	0	–	–	1 November 2011	Free agent	Free	30 June 2015
23	Declan Rudd	GK	(England)	Diss	16 January 1991 (age 35)	14	0	–	–	18 June 2013	Norwich City	Loan	31 May 2014
26	Steven James	GK	(England)	Stockport	(age 18)	–	–	–	–	1 July 2013	Academy	Trainee	30 June 2014
Defenders
3	Scott Laird	LB/LM/CM	(England)	Taunton	15 May 1988 (age 38)	24	4	–	–	27 May 2012	Stevenage	Free	30 June 2014
4	Paul Huntington	CB/RB	(England)	Carlisle	17 September 1987 (age 39)	43	4	–	–	1 July 2012	Yeovil Town	Free	30 June 2014
5	Tom Clarke	CB/DM	(England)	Sowerby Bridge	21 December 1987 (age 38)	–	–	–	–	22 May 2013	Huddersfield Town	Free	30 June 2015
6	Bailey Wright	CB/RB/LB	(Australia)	Melbourne	28 July 1992 (age 34)	59	3	–	–	1 July 2009	Academy	Trainee	30 June 2015
16	David Buchanan	LB/LM	(England)	Rochdale	6 May 1986 (age 40)	38	0	–	–	24 May 2012	Tranmere Rovers	Free	30 June 2014
18	Shane Cansdell-Sherriff	CB/LB/DM	(Australia)	Sydney	10 November 1982 (age 44)	22	1	–	–	16 May 2012	Shrewsbury Town	Free	30 June 2014
20	Ben Davies	CB	(England)	Barrow-in-Furness	11 August 1995 (age 31)	3	0	–	–	25 January 2013	Academy	Trainee	30 June 2014
28	Alex Nicholson	RB/RW	(England)	Newcastle upon Tyne	1 February 1994 (age 32)	–	–	–	–	26 September 2013	Free agent	Free	30 June 2014
32	Scott Wiseman	RB/CB	(Gibraltar)	Kingston upon Hull	9 October 1985 (age 41)	–	–	1	0	10 January 2014	Barnsley	Free	30 June 2015
Midfielders
2	Keith Keane	DM/RB	(Republic of Ireland)	Luton	20 November 1986 (age 39)	31	1	–	–	1 July 2012	Luton Town	30 June 2014	
7	Chris Humphrey	RW/LW	(Jamaica)	Saint Catherine	19 September 1987 (age 39)	–	–	2	0	4 June 2013	Motherwell	Free	30 June 2015
8	Nicky Wroe	CM/RM	(England)	Sheffield	28 September 1985 (age 41)	37	11	–	–	16 May 2012	Shrewsbury Town	Free	30 June 2014
11	Lee Holmes	LM/RM/AM	(England)	Mansfield	2 April 1987 (age 39)	33	3	–	–	29 May 2012	Southampton	Free	30 June 2014
13	Joel Byrom	CM	(England)	Oswaldtwistle	14 September 1986 (age 40)	27	2	–	–	1 July 2012	Stevenage	Free	30 June 2014
19	John Welsh	CM/RM	(England)	Liverpool	10 January 1984 (age 42)	42	1	–	–	14 May 2012	Tranmere Rovers	Free	30 June 2014
21	John Mousinho	CM	(England)	Isleworth	30 April 1986 (age 40)	27	1	–	–	29 May 2012	Stevenage	Free	30 June 2014
22	Jack King	AM/CF/CB	(England)	Oxford	20 August 1985 (age 41)	45	7	–	–	31 May 2012	Woking	Free	30 June 2014
24	Will Hayhurst	LM/RM	(Republic of Ireland)	Longbridge	24 February 1994 (age 32)	27	4	–	–	1 January 2012	Academy	Trainee	30 June 2015
25	Ryan Croasdale	CM	(England)	Lancaster	26 September 1994 (age 32)	–	–	–	–	1 July 2013	Academy	Trainee	30 June 2014
30	Josh Brownhill	CM	(England)	Warrington	19 December 1995 (age 30)	3	1	–	–	1 July 2013	Academy	Trainee	30 June 2014
31	Alan Browne	CM	(Republic of Ireland)	Cork	15 April 1995 (age 31)	–	–	–	–	1 January 2014	Cork City	Undisclosed	30 June 2015
37	Neil Kilkenny	CM	(Australia)	Enfield	19 December 1985 (age 40)	9	0	14	0	14 November 2013	Bristol City	Free	30 June 2014
Forwards
9	Kevin Davies	CF	(England)	Sheffield	26 March 1977 (age 49)	–	–	1	0	10 July 2013	Bolton Wanderers	Free	30 June 2015
10	Stuart Beavon	CF/RW/AM	(England)	Reading	5 May 1984 (age 42)	37	9	–	–	31 August 2012	Wycombe Wanderers	Undisclosed	30 June 2014
12	Paul Gallagher	CF	(Scotland)	Glasgow	9 August 1984 (age 42)	19	1	1	0	30 October 2013	Leicester City	Loan	2 January 2014
14	Joe Garner	CF/RW	(England)	Blackburn	12 April 1988 (age 38)	15	0	–	–	8 January 2013	Watford	Free	30 June 2014
15	Graham Cummins	CF	(Northern Ireland)	Cork	29 December 1987 (age 38)	39	5	–	–	31 January 2012	Cork City	£84,000	30 June 2014
17	Craig Davies	CF	(Wales)	Burton upon Trent	9 January 1986 (age 40)	–	–	7	0	31 January 2014	Bolton Wanderers	Loan	31 May 2014
28	Iain Hume	CF/RW/AM	(Canada)	Edinburgh	30 October 1983 (age 43)	60	22	38	6	14 September 2010	Barnsley	£880,000	30 June 2014
29	Chris Beardsley	CF	(England)	Derby	28 February 1984 (age 42)	22	3	–	–	1 August 2012	Stevenage	Free	30 June 2014

=== Statistics ===
As of 3 May 2014

No.	Pos	Nat	Player	Total		League		FA Cup		League Cup		League Trophy	
No.	Pos	Nat	Player	Apps	Goals	Apps	Goals	Apps	Goals	Apps	Goals	Apps	Goals
1	GK	(Germany) GER	Thorsten Stuckmann	2	0	0	0	0	0	1	0	1	0
2	MF	(Republic of Ireland) IRL	Keith Keane	43	2	30+7	2	4	0	2	0	0	0
3	DF	(England) ENG	Scott Laird	40	1	31+3	1	3+1	0	1	0	1	0
4	DF	(England) ENG	Paul Huntington	30	2	19+4	2	4	0	2	0	1	0
5	DF	(England) ENG	Tom Clarke	49	5	42	3	4	1	2	1	0+1	0
6	DF	(Australia) AUS	Bailey Wright	48	4	43	4	2+1	0	2	0	0	0
7	MF	(Jamaica) JAM	Chris Humphrey	47	2	30+12	2	3	0	1+1	0	0	0
9	FW	(England) ENG	Kevin Davies	42	5	25+12	3	3	2	0+2	0	0	0
10	FW	(England) ENG	Stuart Beavon	30	3	19+7	3	2	0	1	0	0+1	0
11	MF	(England) ENG	Lee Holmes	39	3	18+14	3	2+2	0	2	0	1	0
12	MF	(Scotland) SCO	Paul Gallagher (on loan from Leicester City)	32	9	25+3	6	4	3	0	0	0	0
13	MF	(England) ENG	Joel Byrom	13	2	7+4	2	0+2	0	0	0	0	0
14	FW	(England) ENG	Joe Garner	42	23	27+8	18	2+2	5	1+1	0	1	0
16	DF	(England) ENG	David Buchanan	24	0	16+3	0	3	0	1	0	1	0
17	FW	(Wales) WAL	Craig Davies (on loan from Bolton Wanderers)	15	5	12+3	5	0	0	0	0	0	0
19	MF	(England) ENG	John Welsh	42	2	30+6	2	4	0	1	0	1	0
22	MF	(England) ENG	Jack King	27	2	21+3	2	0+2	0	0+1	0	0	0
23	GK	(England) ENG	Declan Rudd (on loan from Norwich City)	52	0	46	0	5	0	1	0	0	0
24	MF	(Republic of Ireland) IRL	Will Hayhurst	10	0	2+4	0	1+2	0	1	0	0	0
25	MF	(England) ENG	Ryan Croasdale	1	0	0	0	0	0	0	0	1	0
26	GK	(England) ENG	Steven James	0	0	0	0	0	0	0	0	0	0
28	DF	(Wales) WAL	Alex Nicholson	1	0	0	0	0	0	0	0	1	0
30	MF	(England) ENG	Josh Brownhill	25	4	11+13	4	0	0	0	0	0+1	0
31	MF	(Republic of Ireland) IRL	Alan Browne	8	1	4+4	1	0	0	0	0	0	0
32	DF	(Gibraltar) GIB	Scott Wiseman	16	0	13+2	0	1	0	0	0	0	0
37	MF	(Australia) AUS	Neil Kilkenny	30	2	24+3	2	3	0	0	0	0	0
Players currently out on loan:
8	MF	(England) ENG	Nicky Wroe (at Oxford United)	7	0	1+4	0	0	0	0+1	0	1	0
15	FW	(Republic of Ireland) IRL	Graham Cummins (at Rochdale)	0	0	0	0	0	0	0	0	0	0
18	DF	(Australia) AUS	Shane Cansdell-Sherriff (at Burton Albion)	0	0	0	0	0	0	0	0	0	0
20	DF	(England) ENG	Ben Davies (at York City)	0	0	0	0	0	0	0	0	0	0
21	MF	(England) ENG	John Mousinho (at Stevenage)	3	0	0+2	0	0	0	0	0	1	0
27	FW	(Canada) CAN	Iain Hume (at Fleetwood Town)	22	2	9+9	2	1+1	0	2	0	0	0
29	FW	(England) ENG	Chris Beardsley (at Bristol Rovers)	0	0	0	0	0	0	0	0	0	0
Players who have left the club:
17	MF	(England) ENG	Jeffrey Monakana	2	0	0+2	0	0	0	0	0	0	0

=== Play-offs statistics ===
As of 15 May 2014

No.	Pos	Nat	Player	Total		Play-offs	
No.	Pos	Nat	Player	Apps	Goals	Apps	Goals
2	MF	(Republic of Ireland) IRL	Keith Keane	1	0	0+1	0
3	DF	(England) ENG	Scott Laird	1	0	1	0
5	DF	(England) ENG	Tom Clarke	2	0	2	0
6	DF	(Australia) AUS	Bailey Wright	2	0	2	0
7	MF	(Jamaica) JAM	Chris Humphrey	2	0	0+2	0
9	FW	(England) ENG	Kevin Davies	2	0	1+1	0
10	FW	(England) ENG	Stuart Beavon	1	0	0+1	0
11	MF	(England) ENG	Lee Holmes	1	0	1	0
12	MF	(Scotland) SCO	Paul Gallagher (on loan from Leicester City)	2	1	2	1
14	FW	(England) ENG	Joe Garner	2	1	2	1
16	DF	(England) ENG	David Buchanan	1	0	1	0
17	FW	(Wales) WAL	Craig Davies (on loan from Bolton Wanderers)	1	0	1	0
19	MF	(England) ENG	John Welsh	2	0	2	0
22	MF	(England) ENG	Jack King	2	0	2	0
23	GK	(England) ENG	Declan Rudd (on loan from Norwich City)	2	0	2	0
30	MF	(England) ENG	Josh Brownhill	1	0	0+1	0
31	MF	(Republic of Ireland) IRL	Alan Browne	1	0	1	0
32	DF	(Gibraltar) GIB	Scott Wiseman	1	0	1	0
37	MF	(Australia) AUS	Neil Kilkenny	1	0	1	0

=== Captains ===
As of 18 April 2014

No.	P	Name	Country	No. games	Notes
19	MF	John Welsh	(England)	35	
2	MF	Keith Keane	(Republic of Ireland)	15	
6	DF	Bailey Wright	(New Zealand)	2	

Source: Competitive match reports.
Competitive matches only
Matches started as captain only
Country: FIFA nationality; No.: Squad number; P: Position; Name: Player name; No. Games: Number of games started as captain.

==== Goals record ====
As of 15 May 2014

Rank	No.	Po.	Name	League One	FA Cup	League Cup	League Trophy	Play-offs	Total
1	14	FW	Joe Garner	18	5	0	0	1	24
2	12	MF	Paul Gallagher	6	3	0	0	1	10
3	5	DF	Tom Clarke	4	1	1	0	0	6
4	9	FW	Kevin Davies	3	2	0	0	0	5
4	17	FW	Craig Davies	5	0	0	0	0	5
4	Own Goals			5	0	0	0	0	5
7	6	DF	Bailey Wright	4	0	0	0	0	4
8	10	FW	Stuart Beavon	2	0	0	0	0	2
8	11	MF	Lee Holmes	3	0	0	0	0	3
8	30	MF	Josh Brownhill	3	0	0	0	0	3
11	2	MF	Keith Keane	2	0	0	0	0	2
11	4	DF	Paul Huntington	2	0	0	0	0	2
11	7	MF	Chris Humphrey	2	0	0	0	0	2
11	13	MF	Joel Byrom	2	0	0	0	0	2
11	19	MF	John Welsh	2	0	0	0	0	2
11	22	MF	Jack King	1	0	0	0	0	1
11	27	FW	Iain Hume	2	0	0	0	0	2
11	37	MF	Neil Kilkenny	2	0	0	0	0	2
18	3	DF	Scott Laird	1	0	0	0	0	1
18	31	MF	Alan Browne	1	0	0	0	0	1
Total				72	10	1	0	2	85

==== Disciplinary record ====
As of 15 May 2014

No.	Pos.	Name	League One		FA Cup		League Cup		League Trophy		Play-offs		Total	
No.	Pos.	Name	Yellow card	Red card	Yellow card	Red card	Yellow card	Red card	Yellow card	Red card	Yellow card	Red card	Yellow card	Red card
2	MF	Keith Keane	5	0	0	0	0	0	0	0	0	0	5	0
3	DF	Scott Laird	4	0	1	0	0	0	0	0	0	0	5	0
4	DF	Paul Huntington	5	0	0	0	0	0	0	0	0	0	5	0
5	DF	Tom Clarke	6	0	1	0	0	0	0	0	0	0	7	0
6	DF	Bailey Wright	8	0	1	0	0	0	0	0	2	0	11	0
7	MF	Chris Humphrey	1	0	0	0	0	0	0	0	0	0	1	0
9	FW	Kevin Davies	4	1	1	0	0	0	0	0	1	0	6	1
10	FW	Stuart Beavon	1	0	0	1	0	0	0	0	0	0	1	1
11	MF	Lee Holmes	2	0	0	0	1	0	0	0	0	0	3	0
12	MF	Paul Gallagher	4	1	0	0	0	0	0	0	1	0	5	1
13	MF	Joel Byrom	0	0	0	0	1	0	0	0	0	0	1	0
14	FW	Joe Garner	8	0	0	0	0	0	0	0	0	0	8	0
16	DF	David Buchanan	2	0	0	0	0	0	0	0	0	0	2	0
17	FW	Craig Davies	2	0	0	0	0	0	0	0	0	0	2	0
19	MF	John Welsh	10	0	0	0	0	0	0	0	1	0	11	0
22	MF	Jack King	1	0	0	0	0	0	0	0	0	0	1	0
23	GK	Declan Rudd	3	0	0	0	0	0	0	0	0	0	3	0
24	MF	Will Hayhurst	0	0	1	0	0	0	0	0	0	0	1	0
27	FW	Iain Hume	2	0	0	0	0	0	0	0	0	0	2	0
31	MF	Alan Browne	1	0	0	0	0	0	0	0	0	0	1	0
32	DF	Scott Wiseman	2	0	0	0	0	0	0	0	0	0	2	0
37	MF	Neil Kilkenny	4	2	0	0	0	0	0	0	0	0	4	2
Total			68	4	5	1	2	0	0	0	5	0	80	5

=== Suspensions served ===
As of 5 April 2014

Date	Matches missed	Player	Reason	Opponents missed
27 November	3	Joe Garner	Suspended by FA	Bristol City (H), Wycombe (FA), Crawley (A)
30 November	3	Paul Gallagher	(red card) vs Bristol City	Wycombe (FA), Crawley (A), Brentford (H)
30 November	1	Bailey Wright	5× (yellow card)	Wycombe (FA)
21 December	1	Kevin Davies	5× (yellow card)	Carlisle (A)
21 December	1	Joe Garner	5× (yellow card)	Carlisle (A)
29 December	1	Paul Huntington	5× (yellow card)	Port Vale (H)
12 January	3	Kevin Davies	(red card) vs Coventry City	Nott'm Forest (FA), Bradford (A), Notts County (H)
5 April	2	John Welsh	10x (yellow card)	Carlisle United (H), Brentford (A)

=== Contracts ===
No.	Pos.	Nat.	Name	Age	Status	Contract length	Expiry date	Source
6	DF	(Australia)	Bailey Wright	20	Signed	2 years	June 2015	
1	GK	(Germany)	Thorsten Stuckmann	32	Signed	2 years	June 2015	
24	MF	(Republic of Ireland)	Will Hayhurst	18	Signed	2 years	June 2015	

== Transfers ==
=== In ===
No.	Pos.	Nat.	Name	Age	EU	Moving from	Type	Transfer window	Ends	Transfer fee	Source
5	DF	(England)	Tom Clarke	25	EU	Huddersfield Town	Free transfer	Summer	2015	Free	
7	MF	(Jamaica)	Chris Humphrey	25	EU	Motherwell (Scotland)	Free transfer	Summer	2015	Free	
23	GK	(England)	Declan Rudd	22	EU	Norwich City	Loan	Summer	2014	Season Long Loan	
9	FW	(England)	Kevin Davies	36	EU	Bolton Wanderers	Free transfer	Summer	2015	Free	
28	DF	(England)	Alex Nicholson	19	EU	Free agent	Free transfer	Summer	2014	Free	
31	MF	(Republic of Ireland)	Alan Browne	18	EU	Free agent	Free transfer	Winter	2015	Free	
37	MF	(Australia) (England)	Neil Kilkenny	28	EU	Bristol City	Free transfer	Winter	2014	Free	
32	DF	(Gibraltar) (England)	Scott Wiseman	28	EU	Barnsley	Free transfer	Winter	2015	Free	

=== Loans in ===
No.	Pos.	Name	Country	Age	Loan club	Started	Ended	Start source	End source
12	FW	Paul Gallagher	(Scotland)	42	Leicester City	30 October	End of season		
37	MF	Neil Kilkenny	(Australia) (England)	28	Bristol City	14 November	6 January		
17	FW	Craig Davies	(Wales) (England)	40	Bolton Wanderers	31 January	End of Season		

Sources: For loan start source see "Start source". For loan end source see "End source".
EU = if holds or not a European Union passport; Country: when 2 flags, 1st flag = country that plays for internationally, 2nd flag = country of birth; No. = number on jersey; P = Position (for position name, pause mouse pointer on abbreviation); Name = Name on jersey (for more extensive name, pause mouse pointer on name); In/Out = In: The player came in on loan, Out: The player went out on loan; Loan club = the club that the player moved on loan to or the club that the player came from on loan; Started = the date when the player's loan started; Ended = the date when the player's loan ended.

=== Out ===
No.	Pos.	Name	Country	Age	Type	Moving to	Transfer window	Transfer fee	Apps	Goals	Source
27	DF	Luke Foster	(England)	27	Contract Ended	Free agent	Summer	Free	8	1	
5	DF	Chris Robertson	(England)	26	Contract Terminated	Port Vale	Summer	Free	46	2	
18	MF	Andrew Procter	(England)	30	Contract Terminated	Bury	Summer	Free	41	1	
17	MF	Jeffrey Monakana	(England)	20	Transfer	Brighton & Hove Albion	Winter	Undisclosed	49	6	

EU = if holds or not a European Union passport; Country: when 2 flags, 1st flag = country that plays for internationally, 2nd flag = country of birth; N = number on jersey; P = Position (for position name, pause mouse pointer on abbreviation); Name = Name on jersey (for more extensive name, pause mouse pointer on name); Age = age on the day of the signing; Moving from = only indicate the club the player was playing before start playing for this club in this season, for the type of the moving see Status column; Moving to = only indicates the club the player is going to play next, for the type of the moving see Status column; Ends = when the player's current contract ends; n/a = Not applicable; Apps = Total number of competitive appearances (including substitute appearances) at the club prior to departure; Goals = Total number of competitive goals scored at the club prior to departure.

=== Loans out ===
No.	Pos.	Name	Country	Age	Loan club	Started	Ended	Start source	End source
20	DF	Ben Davies	(England)	31	York City	19 July	End of Season		
15	FW	Graham Cummins	(Northern Ireland)	38	Rochdale	2 September	End of season		
17	MF	Jeffrey Monakana	(England)	20	Carlisle United	12 September	12 November		
18	DF	Shane Cansdell-Sherriff	(Australia)	44	Burton Albion	25 September	End of season		
8	MF	Nicky Wroe	(England)	28	Shrewsbury Town	25 October	9 January		
29	FW	Chris Beardsley	(England)	42	Bristol Rovers	31 October	End of season		
21	MF	John Mousinho	(England)	27	Gillingham	7 November	3 December		
8	MF	Nicky Wroe	(England)	41	Oxford United	10 January	End of Season		
21	MF	John Mousinho	(England)	40	Stevenage	31 January	End of Season		

Sources: For loan start source see "Start source". For loan end source see "End source".
EU = if holds or not a European Union passport; Country: when 2 flags, 1st flag = country that plays for internationally, 2nd flag = country of birth; No. = number on jersey; P = Position (for position name, pause mouse pointer on abbreviation); Name = Name on jersey (for more extensive name, pause mouse pointer on name); In/Out = In: The player came in on loan, Out: The player went out on loan; Loan club = the club that the player moved on loan to or the club that the player came from on loan; Started = the date when the player's loan started; Ended = the date when the player's loan ended.

== Fixtures and results ==
=== Pre-season ===
13 July Bill Shankly Shield	Preston North End	0–4	Liverpool	Preston
15:00 BST		Report	Coutinho 15'; Ibe 38'; Sterling 64'; Aspas 75'	Stadium: Deepdale

16 July Jack Kirkland Trophy	Chorley	0–2	Preston North End	Chorley
19:00 BST		Report	Cummins 29'; Byrom 90'	Stadium: Victory Park; Attendance: 1,116; Referee: Steve Rudd

20 July Testimonial Game	Fleetwood Town	4–0	Preston North End	Fleetwood
15:00 BST	Crowther 32', 46'; Sarcevic 65'; Schumacher 79'	Report		Stadium: Highbury Stadium; Attendance: 1,889; Referee: J Simpson

23 July	Preston North End	1–1	Blackburn Rovers	Preston
19:45 BST	K Davies 5'	Report	39' Campbell	Stadium: Deepdale; Attendance: 5,773; Referee: D Bond

26 July	Hartlepool United	0–1	Preston North End	Hartlepool
19:00 BST			Garner 22' (pen.)	Stadium: Victoria Park

27 July 2013	Rochdale	1–1	Preston North End	Rochdale
15:00 BST		Report		Stadium: Spotland Stadium

=== League One ===
3 August 1	Preston North End	0–0	Wolverhampton Wanderers	Preston
15:00 BST		Report		Stadium: Deepdale; Attendance: 16,583; Referee: Andy Haines

10 August 2	Rotherham United	0–0	Preston North End	Rotherham
15:00 BST		Report		Stadium: New York Stadium; Attendance: 8,454; Referee: Trevor Kettle

17 August 3	Preston North End	2–2	Milton Keynes Dons	Preston
15:00 BST	Kay 10' (o.g.); Garner 35'	Report	31' Banton; 63' (pen.) Williams	Stadium: Deepdale; Attendance: 9,994; Referee: Brown

25 August 4	Coventry City	4–4	Preston North End	Northampton
15:00 BST	Clarke 25'; Wilson 70', 83'; Manset 90'	Report	11' Clarke; 65' Wright; 87' Byrom; 90' Humphrey	Stadium: Sixfields Stadium; Attendance: 2,068; Referee: Bobby Madley

31 August 5	Walsall	0–3	Preston North End	Walsall
15:00 BST		Report	30' Byrom; 58' Humphrey; 61' Holmes	Stadium: Bescot Stadium; Attendance: 4,205; Referee: Phil Gibbs

9 September 6	Preston North End	2–1	Oldham Athletic	Preston
19:35 BST	Beavon 13'; K Davies 38' (pen.)	Report	83' Tarkowski	Stadium: Deepdale; Attendance: 10,292; Referee: Michael Naylor

14 September 7	Preston North End	3–0	Stevenage	Preston
15:00 BST	Huntington 45'; Laird 59'; K Davies 84'	Report		Stadium: Deepdale; Attendance: 8,855; Referee: East

21 September 8	Sheffield United	0–1	Preston North End	Sheffield
15:00 BST		Report	68' Beavon	Stadium: Brammall Lane; Attendance: 16,319; Referee: Graham

28 September 9	Preston North End	2–1	Swindon Town	Preston
15:00 BST	Hume 11'; McEveley 48' (o.g.)	Report	86' N'Guessan	Stadium: Deepdale; Attendance: 9,296; Referee: Russell

5 October 10	Peterborough United	2–0	Preston North End	Peterborough
15:00 BST	Barnett 9'; McCann 29'	Report		Stadium: London Road Stadium; Attendance: 7,020; Referee: Carl Boyeson

12 October 11	Preston North End	0–2	Crewe Alexandra	Preston
15:00 BST		Report	27' Moore; 64' Inman	Stadium: Deepdale; Attendance: 9,268; Referee: Trevor Kettle

19 October 12	Gillingham	1–2	Preston North End	Gillingham
15:00 BST	Kedwell 76'	Report	47' Keane; 53' Brownhill	Stadium: Priestfield Stadium; Referee: Graham Horwood

22 October 13	Preston North End	2–2	Bradford City	Preston
19:45 BST	Clarke 32'; Wright 68'	Report	5' Hanson; 73' McArdle	Stadium: Deepdale; Attendance: 11,485; Referee: David Coote

26 October 14	Notts County	0–1	Preston North End	Nottingham
15:00 BST		Report	74' Hume	Stadium: Meadow Lane; Attendance: 4,956; Referee: Scott Mathieson

2 November 15	Preston North End	1–1	Tranmere Rovers	Preston
15:00 BST	Garner 90'	Report	55' Atkinson	Stadium: Deepdale; Attendance: 9,496; Referee: Geoff Eltringham

16 November 16	Leyton Orient	0–1	Preston North End	London
15:00 BST		Report	33' Garner	Stadium: Matchroom Stadium; Attendance: 7,123; Referee: Keith Hill

23 November 17	Preston North End	1–1	Colchester United	Preston
15:00 BST	Garner 45'	Report	76' Garbutt	Stadium: Deepdale; Attendance: 8,492; Referee: Scott Duncan

27 November 18	Port Vale	0–2	Preston North End	Stoke-on-Trent
19:45 BST		Report	(red card) 13' Kilkenny; 30', 71' (pen.) Garner	Stadium: Vale Park; Attendance: 5,889; Referee: Andy Madley

30 November 19	Preston North End	1–0	Bristol City	Preston
15:00 BST	King 33'; Gallagher (red card) 90+2'	Report	(red card) 90+3' Osborne	Stadium: Deepdale; Attendance: 8,803; Referee: Richard Clark

14 December 20	Crawley Town	2–2	Preston North End	Crawley
15:00 GMT		Report		Stadium: Broadfield Stadium; Attendance: 2,407; Referee: Charles Breakspear

21 December 21	Preston North End	0–3	Brentford	Preston
15:00 GMT		Report	23' (pen.) Forshaw; 26' Trotta; 73' Saunders	Stadium: Deepdale; Attendance: 10,332; Referee: Darren Deadman

26 December 22	Carlisle United	0–1	Preston North End	Carlisle
15:00 GMT		Report	42' Brownhill	Stadium: Brunton Park; Attendance: 7,934; Referee: Eddie Ilderton

29 December 23	Shrewsbury Town	0–1	Preston North End	Shrewsbury
15:00 GMT		Report	80' (o.g.) Woods	Stadium: New Meadow; Attendance: 6,379; Referee: Mark Heywood

1 January 24	Preston North End	3–2	Port Vale	Stoke-on-Trent
15:00 GMT	Garner 43', 62'; Gallagher 50'	Report	69' Tomlin; 84' Hugill	Stadium: Vale Park; Attendance: 10,653; Referee: Kevin Wright

11 January 25	Wolverhampton Wanderers	2–0	Preston North End	Wolverhampton
15:00 GMT	Edwards 28'; Evans 55'	Report		Stadium: Molineux Stadium; Attendance: 20,434; Referee: Scott Mathieson

18 January 26	Preston North End	1–1	Coventry City	Preston
15:00 GMT	Davies 54' (red card) 88'	Report	90' Moussa	Stadium: Deepdale; Attendance: 10,671; Referee: Kevin Wright

28 January 27	Bradford City	0–0	Preston North End	Bradford
19:45 GMT	Bennett (red card) 25'	Report	(red card) 25' Kilkenny	Stadium: Valley Parade; Attendance: 13,686; Referee: Stuart Atwell

1 February 28	Preston North End	2–0	Notts County	Preston
15:00 GMT	C Davies 65'; Garner 71' (pen.)	Report		Stadium: Deepdale; Attendance: 9,483; Referee: Tony Harrington

8 February 29	Tranmere Rovers	1–2	Preston North End	Tranmere
15:00 GMT	Taylor 45'	Report	18', 52' Garner	Stadium: Prenton Park; Attendance: 5,895; Referee: David Coote

15 February 30	Preston North End	1–1	Leyton Orient	Preston
15:00 GMT	Garner 64' (pen.)	Report	44' Baudry	Stadium: Deepdale; Attendance: 13,440; Referee: Dean Whitestone

18 February 31	Milton Keynes Dons	0–0	Preston North End	Milton Keynes
19:45 GMT		Report		Stadium: Stadium:mk; Attendance: 7,279; Referee: Mark Heywood

22 February 32	Colchester United	1–2	Preston North End	Colchester
15:00 GMT	Ibehre 55'	Report	28' Clarke; 82' (o.g.) Wilson	Stadium: Colchester Community Stadium; Attendance: 3,416; Referee: David Phillips

25 February 33	Preston North End	3–3	Rotherham United	Preston
19:45 GMT	C Davies 37'; Gallagher 60'; Garner 65'	Report	7', 89' Frecklington; 11' (o.g.) Clarke	Stadium: Deepdale; Attendance: 9,524; Referee: James Adcock

1 March 34	Preston North End	2–1	Walsall	Preston
15:00 GMT	Downing 3' (o.g.); Wright 29'	Report	5', (red card) 82' Mantom	Stadium: Deepdale; Attendance: 10,034; Referee: Seb Stockbridge

8 March 35	Oldham Athletic	1–3	Preston North End	Oldham
15:00 GMT	Harkins 75'; Clark-Harris (red card)	Report	6' Keane; 71', 88' Joe Garner	Stadium: Boundary Park; Attendance: 6,698; Referee: Steve Martin

11 March 36	Stevenage	1–1	Preston North End	Stevenage
19:45 GMT	Smith 90'	Report	17' Clarke	Stadium: Broadhall Way; Attendance: 2,448; Referee: Andy D'Urso

17 March 37	Preston North End	0–0	Sheffield United	Preston
19:45 GMT		Report		Stadium: Deepdale; Attendance: 8,892; Referee: Geoff Eltringham

22 March 38	Swindon Town	1–0	Preston North End	Swindon
15:00 GMT	M Smith 56' (pen.)	Report		Stadium: County Ground; Attendance: 7,570; Referee: Iain Williamson

25 March 39	Preston North End	3–1	Peterborough United	Preston
19:45 GMT	Kilkenny 45'; Garner 80', 90'	Report	18' Swanson	Stadium: Deepdale; Attendance: 8,206; Referee: Mark Brown

29 March 40	Preston North End	1–0	Crawley Town	Preston
15:00 GMT	Garner 13'	Report		Stadium: Deepdale; Attendance: 8,979; Referee: David Webb

5 April 41	Bristol City	1–1	Preston North End	Bristol
15:00 BST	W Elliott 75'	Report	69' King	Stadium: Ashton Gate Stadium; Attendance: 12.537; Referee: Robert Lewis

12 April 42	Preston North End	6–1	Carlisle United	Preston
15:00 BST	Beavon 10'; Browne 20'; Holmes 58'; Davies 57', 79', 83'	Report	41' Madine	Stadium: Deepdale; Attendance: 11,428; Referee: Mark Heywood

18 April 43	Brentford	1–0	Preston North End	London
19:45 BST	Judge 30' (pen.)	Report		Stadium: Griffin Park; Attendance: 10,774; Referee: Keith Hill

21 April 44	Preston North End	5–2	Shrewsbury Town	Preston
15:00 BST	Holmes 34'; Wright 40'; Gallagher 58', 62' (pen.), 81'	Report		Stadium: Deepdale; Attendance: 9,636; Referee: Nigel Miller

26 April 45	Preston North End	3–1	Gillingham	Preston
15:00 BST	Welsh 8'; Gallagher 57'; Kilkenny 63'	Report	45' McDonald	Stadium: Deepdale; Attendance: 11,591; Referee: Charles Breakspear

3 May 46	Crewe Alexandra	2–1	Preston North End	Crewe
15:00 BST	Dugdale 10'; Pogba 60'; Ellis (yellow card) 65'	Report	Wiseman (yellow card) 24'; Welsh 90'	Stadium: Alexandra Stadium; Attendance: 7,458; Referee: Andy Haines

=== League One play-offs ===
10 May 1st leg	Preston North End	1–1	Rotherham United	Preston
17:15 BST	Garner 49'; Welsh (yellow card) 75'; Wright (yellow card) 75'	Report	Revell 21'; Skarz (yellow card) 90'	Stadium: Deepdale; Attendance: 17,221; Referee: Iain Williamson

15 May 2nd leg	Rotherham United	3–1 (4–2 agg.)	Preston North End	Rotherham
19:45 BST	Thomas 24' (yellow card) 70'; Frecklington 34'; Agard 67'; Collin (yellow card) 70'	Report	Wright (yellow card) 11'; Gallagher 16' (yellow card) 71'; Davies (yellow card) 46'	Stadium: New York Stadium; Attendance: 11,576; Referee: Keith Stroud

=== FA Cup ===
9 November 2013 Round 1	Preston North End	6–0	Barnet	Preston
15:00 BST	Clarke 18'; Garner 36', 82'; Gallagher 45', 68', 79'; Beavon (red card) 56'	Report	(red card) 13' Marsh-Brown	Stadium: Deepdale; Attendance: 5,217; Referee: Ross Joyce

7 December 2013 Round 2	Wycombe Wanderers	0–1	Preston North End	High Wycombe
15:00 BST		Report	34' K Davies	Stadium: Adams Park; Attendance: 2,249; Referee: David Webb

4 January 2014 Round 3	Ipswich Town	1–1	Preston North End	Ipswich
15:00 BST	McGoldrick 38'	Report	42' K Davies	Stadium: Portman Road; Attendance: 13,534; Referee: Michael Naylor

14 January 2014 Round 3 replay	Preston North End	3–2	Ipswich Town	Preston
19:45 GMT	Garner 66', 68', 88'	Report	58' Nouble; 76' McGoldrick	Stadium: Deepdale; Attendance: 6,088; Referee: Keith Stroud

24 January 2014 Round 4	Nottingham Forest	0–0	Preston North End	Nottingham
19:45 GMT		Report		Stadium: City Ground; Attendance: 26,465; Referee: Mike Dean

5 February 2014 Round 4 replay	Preston North End	0–2	Nottingham Forest	Preston
19:45 GMT		Report	Mackie 18'; Henderson 90+4'	Stadium: Deepdale; Attendance: 9,744; Referee: Jon Moss

=== League Cup ===
5 August Round 1	Preston North End	1–0	Blackpool	Preston
19:45 BST	Clarke 87'	Report		Stadium: Deepdale; Attendance: 17,470

27 August Round 2	Burnley	2–0	Preston North End	Burnley
19:45 BST	Trippier 6'; Ings 34'	Report		Stadium: Turf Moor

=== League Trophy ===
8 October Round 2	Preston North End	0–2	Oldham Athletic	Preston
19:45 BST		Report	2' Philliskirk; 9' Wesolowski	Stadium: Deepdale; Attendance: 5,987; Referee: Oliver Langford

== Overall summary ==
=== Summary ===
Games played	57 (46 League One, 6 FA Cup, 2 League Cup, 1 League Trophy, 2 Play-offs)
Games won	27 (23 League One, 3 FA Cup, 1 League Cup, 0 League Trophy, 0 Play-offs)
Games drawn	19 (16 League One, 2 FA Cup, 0 League Cup, 0 League Trophy, 1 Play-offs)
Games lost	11 (7 League One, 1 FA Cup, 1 League Cup, 1 League Trophy, 1 Play-offs)
Goals Scored	85 (72 League One, 10 FA Cup, 1 League Cup, 0 League Trophy, 2 Play-offs)
Goals conceded	58 (46 League One, 5 FA Cup, 1 League Cup, 2 League Trophy, 4 Play-offs)
Goal difference	+27
Clean sheets	21 (17 League One, 3 FA Cup, 1 League Cup, 0 League Trophy, 0 Play-offs)
Yellow cards	80 (68 League One, 5 FA Cup, 2 League Cup, 0 League Trophy, 5 Play-offs)
Red cards	5 (4 League One, 1 FA Cup, 0 League Cup, 0 League Trophy)
Worst discipline	John Welsh (11 (yellow card) , 0 (red card)
Best result	6–0 vs Barnet
Worst result	0–3 vs Brentford
Most appearances	Declan Rudd (54)
Top scorer	Joe Garner (24)
Points	85

=== Score overview ===
Opposition	Home score	Away score	Double
Bradford City	2–2	0–0	No
Brentford	0–3	0–1	No
Bristol City	1–0	1–1	No
Carlisle United	6–1	1–0	Yes
Colchester United	1–1	2–1	No
Coventry City	1–1	4–4	No
Crawley Town	1–0	3–3	No
Crewe Alexandra	0–2	1–2	No
Gillingham	3–1	2–1	Yes
Leyton Orient	1–1	1–0	No
Milton Keynes Dons	2–2	0–0	No
Notts County	2–0	1–0	Yes
Oldham Athletic	2–1	3–1	Yes
Peterborough United	3–1	0–2	No
Port Vale	3–2	2–0	Yes
Rotherham United	3–3	0–0	No
Sheffield United	0–0	1–0	No
Shrewsbury Town	5–2	1–0	Yes
Stevenage	3–0	1–1	No
Swindon Town	2–1	0–1	No
Tranmere Rovers	1–1	2–1	No
Walsall	2–1	3–0	Yes
Wolverhampton Wanderers	0–0	0–2	No
