= Paul Gallagher (footballer) =

Scottish footballer (born 1984)

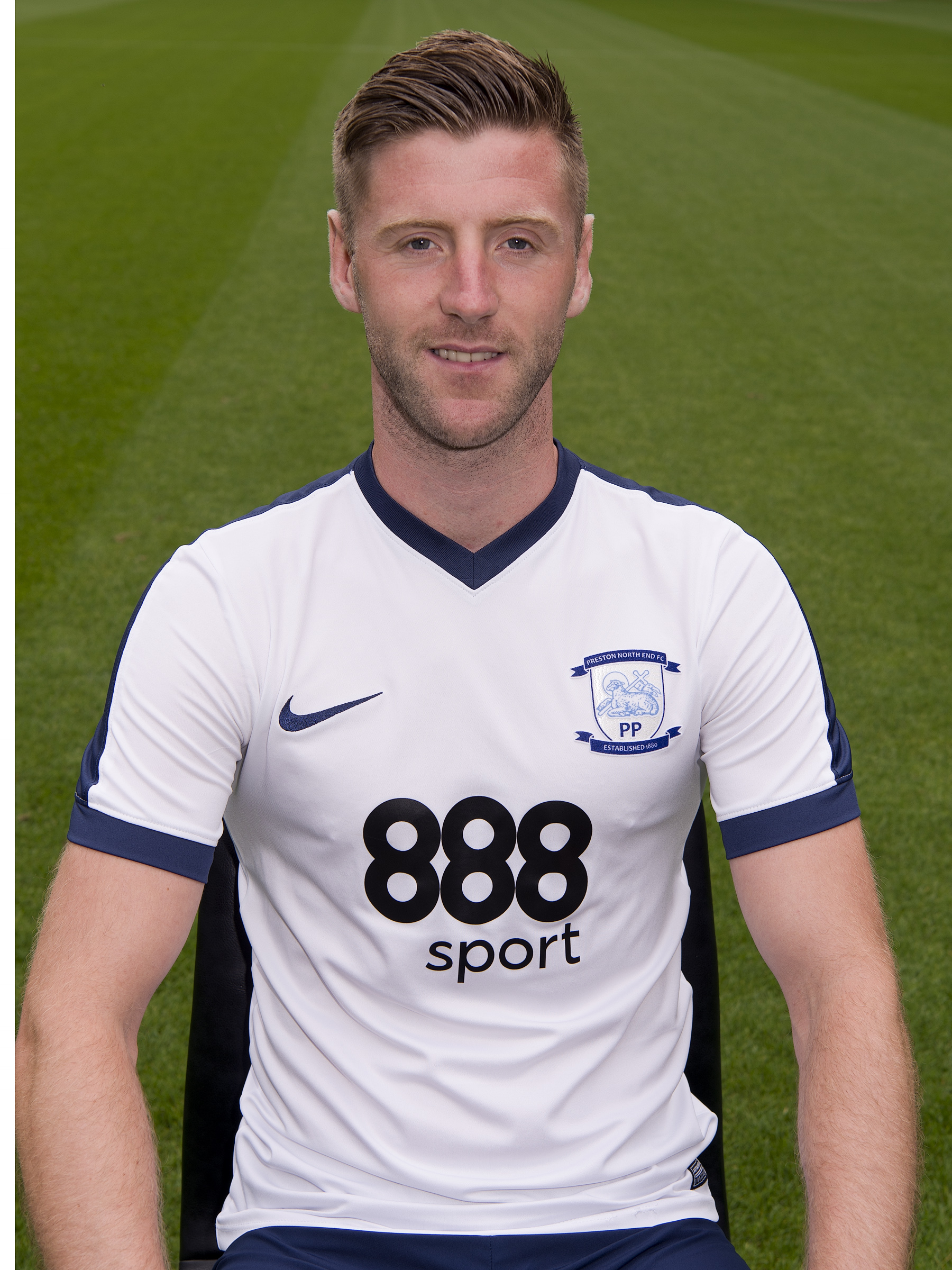
- Gallagher with Preston North End in 2016

Personal information
- Full name: Paul Gallagher
- Date of birth: 9 August 1984 (age 42)
- Place of birth: Glasgow, Scotland
- Height: 6 ft 0 in (1.83 m)
- Position: Midfielder

Team information
- Current team: Leyton Orient (first team coach)

Youth career
- –2003: Blackburn Rovers

Senior career*
Years	Team	Apps	(Gls)
2002–2009	Blackburn Rovers	61	(6)
2005–2006	→ Stoke City (loan)	37	(11)
2007–2008	→ Preston North End (loan)	19	(1)
2008	→ Stoke City (loan)	7	(0)
2008–2009	→ Plymouth Argyle (loan)	40	(13)
2009–2015	Leicester City	118	(25)
2012	→ Sheffield United (loan)	6	(1)
2013–2014	→ Preston North End (loan)	28	(6)
2014–2015	→ Preston North End (loan)	46	(7)
2015–2021	Preston North End	190	(20)
Total		552	(90)

International career
2004	Scotland	1	(0)

Managerial career
- 2023: Stoke City (caretaker)
- 2026: Barrow
- * Club domestic league appearances and goals

Paul Gallagher (born 9 August 1984) is a Scottish former professional footballer who played as a midfielder. He is currently a first team coach at League One club Leyton Orient.

Born in Glasgow, he played in the Premier League for Blackburn Rovers, and the Football League for Stoke City (two spells), Preston North End (four spells), Plymouth Argyle, Leicester City and Sheffield United. He scored 100 senior career goals in over 500 games and was capped once by the Scotland national team.

== Club career ==
=== Blackburn Rovers ===
Gallagher made his debut performance as a substitute in a 2–0 win over the 2001–02 Premier League champions Arsenal on 15 March 2003, as a replacement for Dwight Yorke. He scored his first goal in a 4–0 win over Birmingham City in the 2003–04 season. On 21 February 2004, in an away game against Charlton Athletic, Gallagher assisted goalkeeper Brad Friedel to his only career goal from open play in the 90th minute. Friedel's goal equalised the game at 2–2, but seconds later Charlton scored again through Claus Jensen and went on to win the match 3–2.

==== Loan moves ====
He spent almost all of the 2005–06 season on loan to Stoke City. He played most of his 36 games on the left or right wing, scoring 12 goals. Against Southampton on 15 April 2006, he exchanged a one-two on the edge of the area with Adam Rooney before drilling home a thunderous thirty-yard drive into the far top corner of the net. He was recalled by Blackburn in April 2006 with three games remaining in the Premier League season, coming on as a late substitute in the final game of the season, being involved in the creation of the final goal of the game.

On transfer deadline day 31 August 2007, Gallagher signed a six-month loan deal with Championship side Preston North End, after being linked with a return to Stoke. He scored once during his spell at Preston, scoring the winner in a 1–0 win over Sheffield Wednesday. The following January, he moved from Blackburn back to Stoke City on loan again until summer of 2008. Then-manager Tony Pulis however, was not impressed with Gallagher, remarking he "hasn't done as well as the other players."

On 30 August 2008, Gallagher signed on loan for the rest of the 2008–09 season with Plymouth Argyle, making his debut that same day at Turf Moor against Burnley. Although Blackburn Rovers appointed Sam Allardyce as their new manager in December 2008, Plymouth was allowed to keep Gallagher for the remainder of his loan. He was a huge impact for the club, scoring 13 goals in 40 league games. Gallagher was hopeful that he would secure a permanent deal with Plymouth after resigning himself to the fact that he was not wanted at Blackburn. Seeing his return to Blackburn as a fresh start, Gallagher was informed by Sam Allardyce he could yet have a future at the club.

=== Leicester City ===
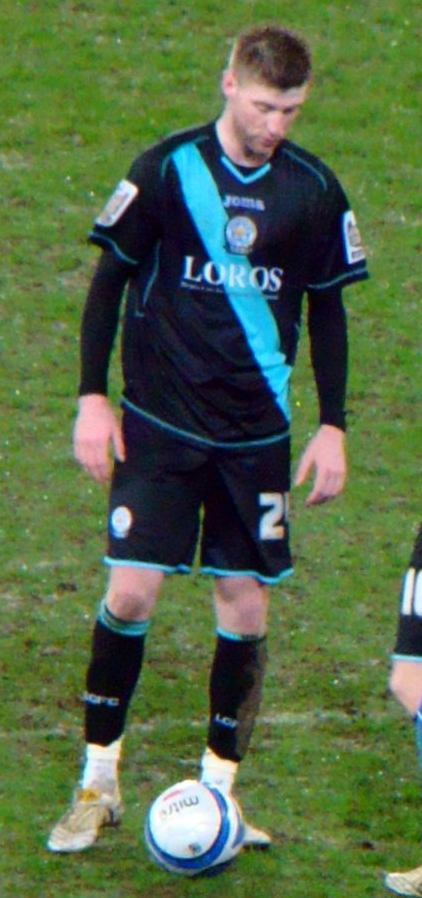
Gallagher playing for Leicester City in 2010

On 21 August 2009, Gallagher signed a three-year deal with Leicester City for an undisclosed fee. Handed the number 24 shirt, Gallagher was "delighted to be here and can't wait to get started." He scored his first two goals for Leicester in a 2–0 win over Crystal Palace on 20 October 2009, coming on as a half-time substitute for Lloyd Dyer. Gallagher failed to score for 17 games before bagging a hat-trick and assisting a goal in a 5–1 win over Scunthorpe United on 13 February 2010. Leaving the field to a standing ovation 7 minutes from the final whistle, it was his first ever professional hat-trick. On 27 February, Gallagher scored from a free-kick in a 3–0 win over Nottingham Forest. His fine form earned him the Championship Player of the Month award for February.

On 12 March 2011, Gallagher provided three assists as Leicester beat Scunthorpe 3–0 at Glanford Park, earning praise from manager Sven-Göran Eriksson, who believed "he is not far from Beckham in terms of his delivery of set-pieces." He signed a contract extension with the club on 15 March 2011, which would last until the summer of 2015. Gallagher scored two goals in Leicester's 3–0 win over Crystal Palace at the King Power Stadium on 20 November 2011.

==== Loan moves ====
In September 2012, Gallagher joined Sheffield United on a month-long loan. He made six appearances for the South Yorkshire club, scoring once during a 2–1 win at Hartlepool United. Despite United seeking to extend his temporary deal, Gallagher returned to his parent club in October.

On 30 October 2013, Gallagher re-joined former club Preston North End on loan until 2 January 2014. Gallagher made his début on 2 November against Tranmere Rovers and then scored a hat-trick in his next game against Barnet in the FA Cup. On 21 April, Gallagher scored another hat-trick, this time against Shrewsbury Town. On 5 July 2014, Gallagher again joined Preston North End on loan for the 2014–15 season. He played 59 times for North End in 2014–15 scoring 13 goals as they gained promotion after beating Swindon Town 4–0 in the play-off final.

=== Preston North End ===
After three loan spells at Preston, Gallagher completed a permanent move in June 2015, signing a two-year contract.

A notable appearance took place on Saturday 3 November 2018. Whilst playing away at Ipswich, Gallagher came on as a 72nd minute substitute. With his first touch, he scored a free kick. In the 75th minute, he was forced to play in goal following the sending off of goalkeeper Chris Maxwell. He made a save in the 88th minute as Preston drew the match 1–1.

Gallagher was voted Preston North End's player of the decade (2010–2019) by fans in January 2020.

== Coaching career ==
On 10 May 2021, it was announced that Gallagher would be retiring from football and would be stepping into the role of first-team coach at Preston, assisting new permanent head coach Frankie McAvoy, a role he had been in since March of that year. Gallagher left Preston in July 2023 and was appointed first-team coach at Stoke City working under Alex Neil. On 10 December 2023, Neil left his position at Stoke, and Gallagher was appointed as caretaker manager. Gallagher oversaw two EFL Championship draws against Swansea City and West Bromwich Albion before he reverted to first-team coach under new manager Steven Schumacher. Gallagher left his role at Stoke in June 2024.

=== Barrow ===
On 2 January 2026, Gallagher was appointed head coach of League Two club Barrow on an eighteen-month contract, with the option for a further year. Prior to the appointment, he had been working at the club on an interim basis, supporting caretaker manager Neil McDonald

On 11 February 2026, Gallagher was dismissed after losing all five of his matches in charge, with the club sitting three points above the relegation zone at the time of his departure. His five consecutive defeats without a win represented the lowest win percentage of any Barrow manager to take charge of at least five matches in the club's 125-year history.

== International career ==
Gallagher's form for Blackburn Rovers in January 2004 impressed Berti Vogts, then manager of Scotland, who described him as "very quick, strong and with good body movement." He made his international debut on 18 February 2004 as a 67th-minute substitute in a 4–0 defeat against Wales.

== Career statistics ==
=== Club ===
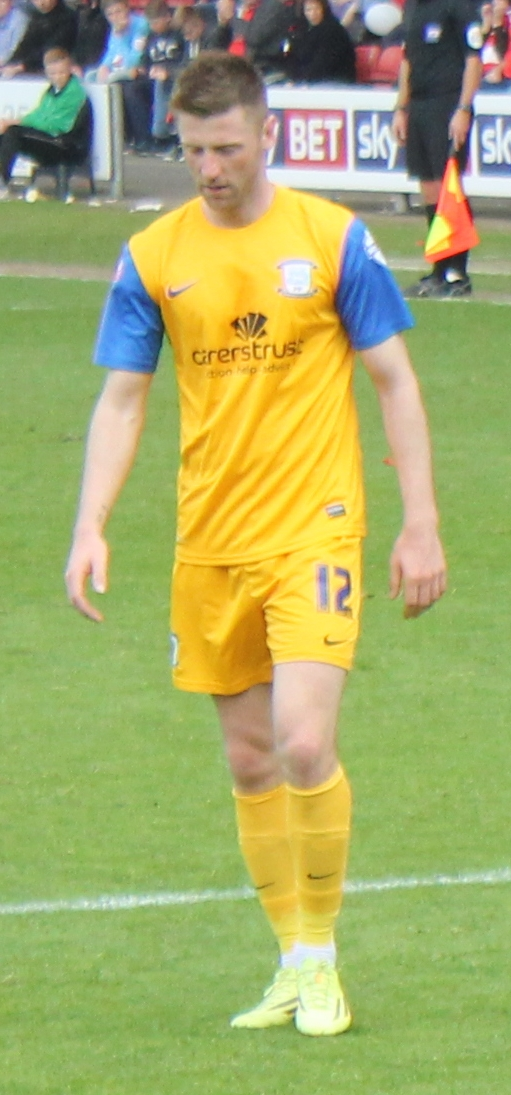
Gallagher playing for Preston North End in 2014

Appearances and goals by club, season and competition
Club	Season	League			FA Cup		League Cup		Europe		Other		Total	
Club	Season	Division	Apps	Goals	Apps	Goals	Apps	Goals	Apps	Goals	Apps	Goals	Apps	Goals
Blackburn Rovers	2002–03	Premier League	1	0	0	0	0	0	0	0	—		1	0
Blackburn Rovers	2003–04	Premier League	26	3	1	0	1	0	0	0	—		28	3
Blackburn Rovers	2004–05	Premier League	16	2	4	0	1	1	—		—		21	3
Blackburn Rovers	2005–06	Premier League	1	0	—		0	0	—		—		1	0
Blackburn Rovers	2006–07	Premier League	16	1	2	1	0	0	4 (Note: Appearances in UEFA Cup)	0	—		22	2
Blackburn Rovers	2008–09	Premier League	0	0	—		1	0	—		—		1	0
Blackburn Rovers	2009–10	Premier League	1	0	—		—		—		—		1	0
Blackburn Rovers	Total		61	6	7	1	3	1	4	0	—		75	8
Stoke City (loan)	2005–06	Championship	37	11	3	1	—		—		—		40	12
Preston North End (loan)	2007–08	Championship	19	1	—		—		—		—		19	1
Stoke City (loan)	2007–08	Championship	7	0	—		—		—		—		7	0
Plymouth Argyle (loan)	2008–09	Championship	40	13	1	0	—		—		—		41	13
Leicester City	2009–10	Championship	41	7	2	0	1	0	—		2 (Note: Appearances in Championship play-offs)	0	46	7
Leicester City	2010–11	Championship	41	10	2	1	4	0	—		—		47	11
Leicester City	2011–12	Championship	28	8	4	0	2	2	—		—		34	10
Leicester City	2012–13	Championship	8	0	1	0	1	0	—		0	0	10	0
Leicester City	Total		118	25	9	1	8	2	—		2	0	137	28
Sheffield United (loan)	2012–13	League One	6	1	—		—		—		—		6	1
Preston North End (loan)	2013–14	League One	28	6	5	3	—		—		2 (Note: Appearances in League One play-offs)	1	35	10
Preston North End (loan)	2014–15	League One	46	7	6	5	1	0	—		6 (Note: Appearances in Football League Trophy and League One play-offs)	1	59	13
Preston North End	2015–16	Championship	41	5	1	0	0	0	—		—		42	5
Preston North End	2016–17	Championship	31	1	2	0	1	0	—		—		34	1
Preston North End	2017–18	Championship	32	2	1	0	1	0	—		—		34	2
Preston North End	2018–19	Championship	40	6	1	0	1	0	—		—		42	6
Preston North End	2019–20	Championship	33	6	0	0	0	0	—		—		33	6
Preston North End	2020–21	Championship	13	0	0	0	2	0	—		—		15	0
Preston North End	Total		264	33	16	8	6	0	—		8	2	313	44
Career total			552	90	36	11	17	3	4	0	10	2	619	106

=== International ===
Appearances and goals by national team and year
National team	Year	Apps	Goals
Scotland	2004	1	0
Total		1	0

== Honours ==
Preston North End

- Football League One play-offs: 2015
