= Bailey Wright =

Australian soccer player (born 1992)

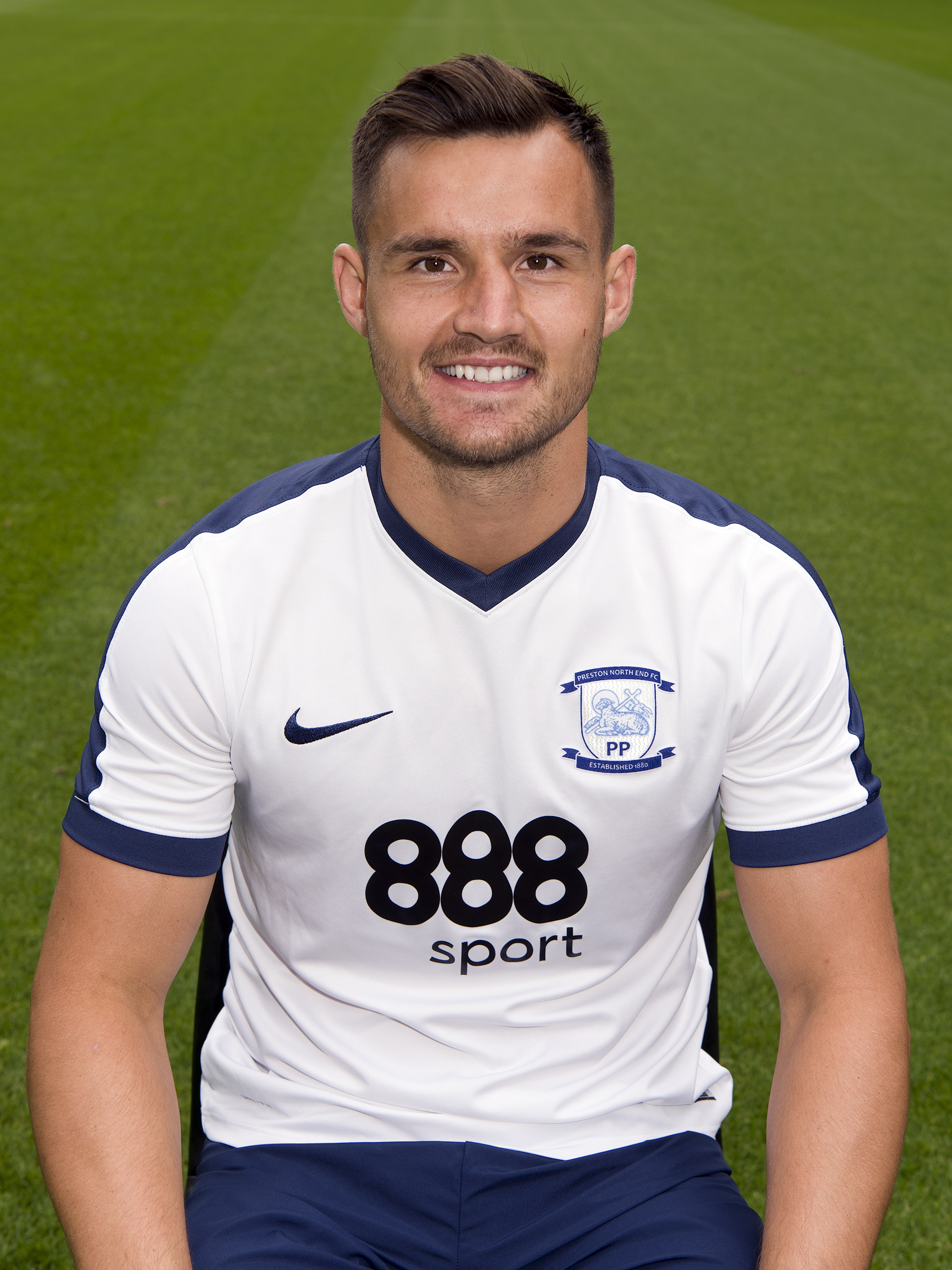
- Wright with Preston North End in 2016

Personal information
- Full name: Bailey Colin Wright
- Date of birth: 28 July 1992 (age 34)
- Place of birth: Melbourne, Australia
- Height: 1.84 m (6 ft 0 in)
- Position: Centre-back

Team information
- Current team: Lion City Sailors
- Number: 26

Youth career
- 1998–2004: Langwarrin
- 2005: Mornington
- 2006: Dandenong Thunder
- 2007–2008: VIS
- 2009–2010: Preston North End

Senior career*
Years	Team	Apps	(Gls)
2010–2017	Preston North End	179	(8)
2017–2020	Bristol City	72	(1)
2020	→ Sunderland (loan)	5	(0)
2020–2023	Sunderland	84	(4)
2023	→ Rotherham United (loan)	7	(0)
2023–	Lion City Sailors	55	(12)

International career
2008–2009	Australia U17	3	(0)
2014–2023	Australia	29	(2)
- * Club domestic league appearances and goals as of 1 November 2026

Bailey Colin Wright (born 28 July 1992) is an Australian professional soccer player who plays either as a centre-back or full-back for Singapore Premier League club Lion City Sailors.

Before moving to Lion City Sailors, Wright played his entire senior career in England, with Preston North End, Bristol City and Sunderland.

He was selected for Australia's 23-man squad for the 2014 FIFA World Cup in Brazil and 26-man squad for the 2022 FIFA World Cup in Qatar.

== Club career ==
=== Early career ===
Wright spent his formative years at Langwarrin, before playing a season each with Mornington and Dandenong Thunder. He was identified as a promising talent, eventually earning selection for the Victorian state team in 2007. He honed his skills further with the Victorian Institute of Sport in 2008, returning to Langwarrin in 2009 where he made several senior league appearances, before moving overseas in July 2009, signing a two-year scholarship with Preston North End after a protracted clearance saga.

=== Preston North End ===
In his first season with Preston North End, Wright played predominantly as a centre-half for the reserves and under-18 teams, but was eventually called up to the senior squad in April, sitting on the bench for the club's fixture away to Coventry City. He commenced the 2010–11 season with his debut senior appearance in the first round of the League Cup, playing the full 90 minutes in the Lilywhites' 5–0 win against Stockport County. On 13 December 2010, Wright was handed a two-and-a-half-year professional contract.

Wright made his league debut for Preston on 5 March 2011 against Norwich City. He scored his first professional goal for Preston on 7 April 2012 against MK Dons.

Wright was voted 'Young Player of the Year' of Preston North End for the 2012–13 season. On 1 May 2013, he was handed a new two-year contract, with the option of staying at Preston North End for another year.

Wright won promotion via the play-Offs with Preston in 2015, defeating Swindon Town 4–0 at Wembley on 24 May 2015.

=== Bristol City ===
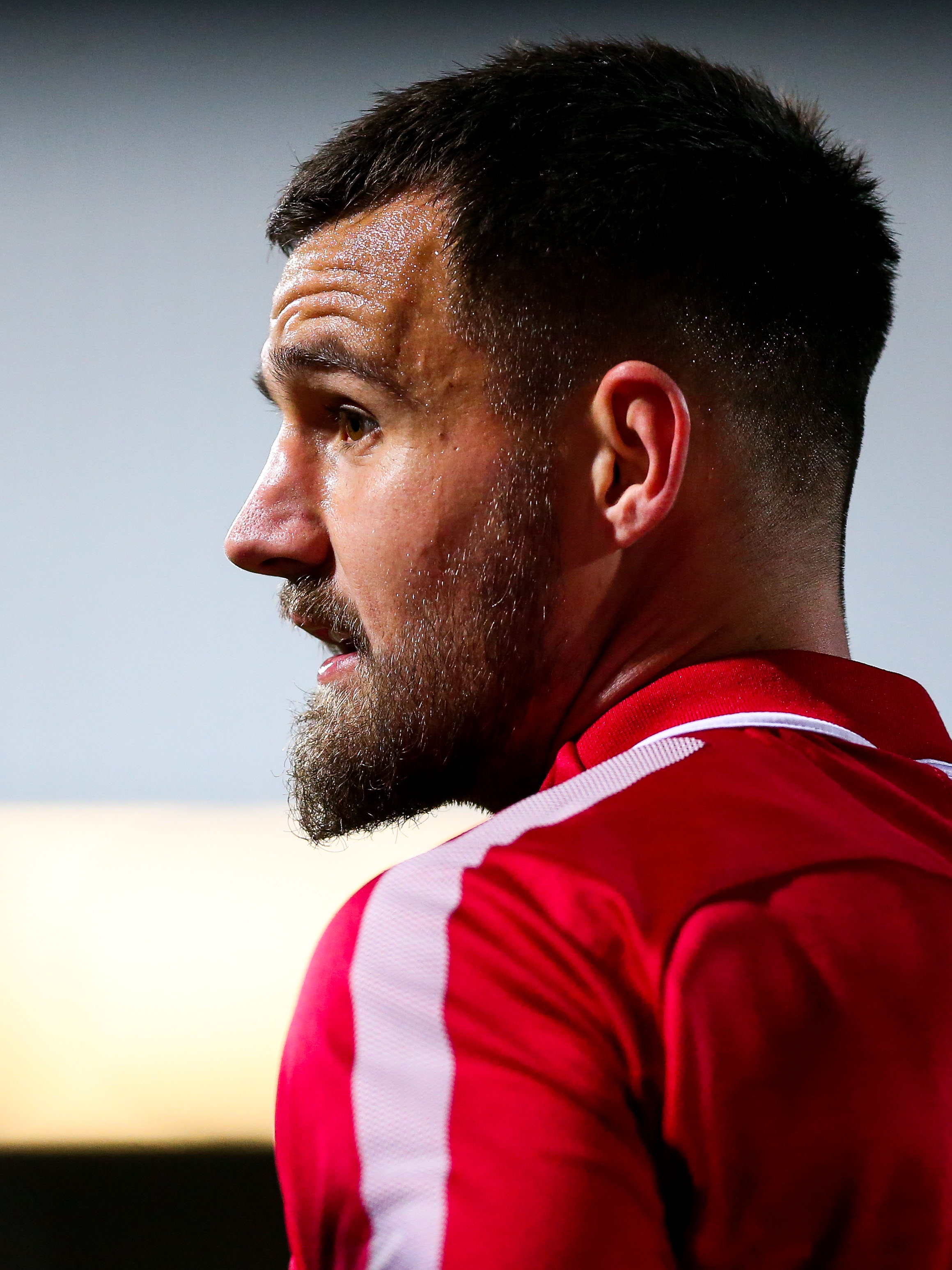
Wright with Bristol City in 2019

On 6 January 2017, it was announced that Wright joined Bristol City for an undisclosed fee, signing a 2 1/2-year contract. On 7 January 2017, he made his debut in the FA Cup third round tie against Fleetwood Town. He scored his first goal for Bristol City in a 1–1 draw with Norwich City on 7 March 2017. At the start of the 2017–18 season, Wright was named as Bristol City captain.

Wright featured as Bristol City reached the semi-finals of the 2017–18 EFL Cup with wins over Premier League opponents Watford, Stoke City, Crystal Palace and Manchester United. Wright played as City lost in the semi-final tie against Premier League leaders Manchester City. Wright was released by Bristol City at the end of his contract in July 2020.

=== Sunderland ===
Wright signed a six-month loan deal with League One club Sunderland on 21 January 2020. On 2 August 2020, Wright signed for Sunderland on a permanent basis, on a two-year deal. He scored his first goal for Sunderland in a 2–2 draw with Rochdale on 27 October 2020.

On 1 July 2023, Sunderland announced his departure from the club. Wright made 107 appearances in total, serving as club captain. During this time he lifted their first trophy since 1973, the 2020-21 EFL Trophy at Wembley Stadium, before earning promotion back to the English second tier for the 2022–23 EFL Championship.

Loan to Rotherham United

Wright joined fellow Championship club Rotherham United in a deadline day loan move on 31 January 2023. He made his debut for the club on 4 February in a goalless draw against Sheffield United.

=== Lion City Sailors ===
On 9 July 2023, Wright moved to Southeast Asia to signed with Singapore Premier League club Lion City Sailors, signing a two-year contract with an optional one-year extension. He made his debut for the club on 11 July in a 1–3 defeat against DPMM. On his return from red card suspension on 31 July, Wright scored a brace in a 5–2 win over Tanjong Pagar United. In his first season at the club, he helped them to win the 2023 Singapore Cup in a 3-1 win over Hougang United on 12 September.

He helped the club to win the 2024 Singapore Community Shield in a 2–0 win over Albirex Niigata (S) on 4 May 2024. During the 2024–25 AFC Champions League Two fixture against Indonesian club Persib Bandung on 24 October, Wright scored an equaliser after a cross from Maxime Lestienne which ended up in a 1–1 away draw. Despite Maxime Lestienne's equaliser in the 91st minute of the 2025 AFC Champions League Two final against Sharjah, Wright finished as a runner-up after a 1–2 defeat.

== International career ==
=== Youth ===
Wright was a member of the Australia U17 squad that reached the quarter-finals of the AFC U-16 Championship, narrowly missing a place at the 2009 FIFA U-17 World Cup when they lost 2–3 against United Arab Emirates.

=== Senior ===
Wright was selected as part of Ange Postecoglou 23-man squad for the 2014 FIFA World Cup in Brazil, one of two new inclusions but didn't make any single appearance in the tournament.

Wright made his Australia national team debut starting in a friendly match against Saudi Arabia at Craven Cottage in London on 8 September 2014 where he scored a header in this debut giving Australia a two-goal lead which ended in a 3-–2 win.

Wright was called up for the 2017 FIFA Confederations Cup in Russia where he played in all three of the team group stage matches.

Wright was in the team preliminary squad for the 2018 FIFA World Cup in Russia but didn't make it into Bert van Marwijk's final 23 man squad.

Wright was selected as part of Graham Arnold 26-man squad for the 2022 FIFA World Cup in Qatar in which he came on as a substitute in the last group stage fixtures against Denmark on 30 November 2022.

== Career statistics ==
=== Club ===
As of match played 30 May 2026

Appearances and goals by club, season and competition
Club	Season	League			National cup		League Cup		Other		Total	
Club	Season	Division	Apps	Goals	Apps	Goals	Apps	Goals	Apps	Goals	Apps	Goals
Preston North End	2010–11	Championship	2	0	0	0	2	0	—		4	0
Preston North End	2011–12	League One	13	1	0	0	1	0	—		14	1
Preston North End	2012–13	League One	38	2	0	0	1	0	2 (Note: Appearances in Football League Trophy)	0	41	2
Preston North End	2013–14	League One	43	4	4	0	2	0	2 (Note: Appearances in League One play-offs)	0	51	4
Preston North End	2014–15	League One	27	1	2	0	1	0	3	0	33	1
Preston North End	2015–16	Championship	38	0	0	0	3	0	—		41	0
Preston North End	2016–17	Championship	18	0	0	0	3	0	—		21	0
Preston North End	Total		179	8	6	0	13	0	7	0	205	8
Bristol City	2016–17	Championship	21	1	3	0	—		—		24	1
Bristol City	2017–18	Championship	36	0	0	0	4	0	—		40	0
Bristol City	2018–19	Championship	12	0	3	0	0	0	—		15	0
Bristol City	2019–20	Championship	3	0	0	0	1	0	—		4	0
Bristol City	Total		72	1	6	0	5	0	—		83	1
Sunderland (loan)	2019–20	League One	5	0	—		—		—		5	0
Sunderland	2020–21	League One	33	2	0	0	1	0	5 (Note: Three appearances in EFL Trophy, two in League One play-offs)	0	39	2
Sunderland	2021–22	League One	37	2	1	0	5	0	3	0	46	2
Sunderland	2022–23	Championship	14	0	1	0	1	0	—		16	0
Sunderland	Total		84	4	2	0	7	0	8	0	106	4
Rotherham United (loan)	2022–23	Championship	7	0	—		—		—		7	0
Rotherham United (loan)	Total		7	0	0	0	0	0	0	0	7	0
Club	Season	League			National cup		Charity Shield		Continential (Note: Includes AFC Champions League, AFC Champions League Two and ASEAN Club Championship)		Total	
Club	Season	Division	Apps	Goals	Apps	Goals	Apps	Goals	Apps	Goals	Apps	Goals
Lion City Sailors	2023	Singapore Premier League	4	2	4	1	1	0	2	0	11	3
Lion City Sailors	2024–25	Singapore Premier League	28	4	3	1	1	0	17 (Note: Includes 12 match in AFC Champions League Two and 5 matches in ASEAN Club Championship)	2 (Note: Includes 1 goal in AFC Champions League Two and 1 goal in AFC Champions League Two)	52	7
Lion City Sailors	2025–26	Singapore Premier League	19	5	3	1	1	0	8 (Note: Includes 5 match in AFC Champions League Two and 3 matches in ASEAN Club Championship)	0	31	6
Lion City Sailors	2026–27	Singapore Premier League	0	0	0	0	0	0	0	0	0	0
Lion City Sailors	Total	Singapore Premier League	51	11	13	3	3	0	27	2	94	16
Career total			390	20	23	2	27	0	35	2	481	24

=== International ===
As of match played 1 March 2023

International statistics
National team	Year	Apps	Goals
Australia	2014	1	1
Australia	2015	7	0
Australia	2016	4	0
Australia	2017	9	0
Australia	2018	1	0
Australia	2019	2	0
Australia	2020	0	0
Australia	2021	0	0
Australia	2022	4	1
Australia	2023	1	0
Total		29	2

As of match played 15 November 2017. Australia score listed first, score column indicates score after each Wright goal.

International goals by date, venue, cap, opponent, score, result and competition
No.	Date	Venue	Cap	Opponent	Score	Result	Competition	Ref
1	8 September 2014	Craven Cottage, London, England	2	Saudi Arabia	3–1	3–2	Friendly	
2	1 June 2022	Al Janoub Stadium, Al Wakrah, Qatar	25	Jordan	1–1	2–1	Friendly	

== Honours ==
Preston North End

- Football League One play-offs: 2015

Sunderland

- EFL Trophy: 2020–21
- EFL League One play-offs: 2022

Lion City Sailors

- AFC Champions League Two runner-up: 2024–25
- Singapore Premier League: 2024–25
- Singapore Cup: 2023, 2024–25, 2025–26
- Singapore Community Shield: 2024; runner-up: 2025

Individual

- Singapore Premier League Team of the Year: 2024–25
