= Alex Nicholson (Welsh footballer) =

Welsh footballer

Personal information
- Full name: Alex Jack Nicholson
- Date of birth: 1 February 1994 (age 32)
- Place of birth: Newcastle upon Tyne, England
- Positions: Right-back; right winger

Team information
- Current team: West Allotment Celtic

Youth career
- Cramlington Juniors FC
- 2007–2013: Newcastle United

Senior career*
Years	Team	Apps	(Gls)
2013–2014	Preston North End	0	(0)
2014	→ Chorley (loan)	5	(0)
2014–2016	Blyth Spartans	107	(7)
2016–2018	South Shields	61	(3)
2018–2019	Blyth Spartans	34	(1)
2019–2022	Gateshead	70	(3)
2022–2023	Blyth Spartans	0	(0)
2023	Newcastle Blue Star	14	(1)
2023–2025	North Shields	12	(0)
2025–	West Allotment Celtic	0	(0)

International career
2012–2013	Wales U19	4	(0)
- * Club domestic league appearances and goals as of 09:42, 10 June 2022 (UTC)

Alex Jack Nicholson (born 1 February 1994) is a Welsh footballer who plays as a right-back and as a right-winger for Blyth Spartans. He has also played for the Wales U19 national team. He previously played for Newcastle Academy and Reserves, Chorley, Preston North End, Blyth Spartans, South Shields, Gateshead North Shields FC, West Allotment Celtic.

== Career ==
=== Newcastle United ===
Nicholson signed for Newcastle United in 2007, originally playing as a winger before converting to full-back. He made his reserve team debut in December 2010 but did not play for the first team.

=== Preston North End ===
After leaving Newcastle, Nicholson signed for Preston North End on 26 September 2013 until the end of the season, having trained with the team without a contract since pre-season. He made his first team debut in the Football League Trophy on 8 October 2013, this turned out to be his only appearance for the club.

On 27 March 2014, Nicholson joined Chorley on loan. Helping them to secure the Evo-Stik Northern Premier League Premier Division, securing promotion to the Conference North. He was then released by Preston North End at the end of the 2013–14 season.

=== Blyth Spartans ===
Nicholson joined the Blyth Spartans, playing in the Northern Premier League Premier Division, signing a one-year contract at the start of the 2014–2015 season. He was part of the squad which reached the 2014/2015 FA Cup 1st Round Proper being drawn against Conference club Altrincham on 27 October, he was then part of the team that reached the 2nd round of the FA Cup after beating Altrincham 4–1. He was part of the team that famously reached the 3rd round of the FA Cup before bowing out of the cup, losing 3–2 to Birmingham City. Nicholson later signed another year contract at the start of the 2015–2016 season.

=== Gateshead ===
In June 2019, Nicholson became Mike Williamson's first signing when he moved to National League North side Gateshead. At the end of his first season with the club, he won the club's Players' Player of the Year Award. In the 2021–22 season, Nicholson made 23 league appearances as the club won promotion to the National League. On 6 June 2022, it was announced that Nicholson was to leave the club to move away from full-time football.

=== Blyth Spartans return ===
In June 2022, Nicholson returned to National League North club Blyth Spartans.

== International career ==
Nicholson was selected for a Wales U19 friendly match against Germany in September 2012, and went on to play in all three of Wales' games at the 2013 U19 European Championship qualifiers in Slovenia.

== Career statistics ==
Club	Season	League		FA Cup		League Cup		FL Trophy		Total	
Club	Season	Apps	Goals	Apps	Goals	Apps	Goals	Apps	Goals	Apps	Goals
Preston North End	2013–14	0	0	0	0	0	0	1	0	1	0
Career totals		0	0	0	0	0	0	1	0	1	0
