= List of English football transfers summer 2015 =

This is a list of English football transfers for the 2015 summer transfer window. Only moves featuring at least one Premier League or Championship club are listed.

The summer transfer window began once clubs had concluded their final domestic fixture of the 2014–15 season, but many transfers officially went through on 1 July because the majority of player contracts finished on 30 June. The window remained open until 18:00 BST on 1 September 2015. The window shut at 18:00 BST, this time due to the UEFA player registration deadlines for both the Champions League and Europa League ending at 23:00 BST, giving the six sides still in Europe time to conclude deals and register their player for continental matches if appropriate.

This list also includes transfers featuring at least one Premier League or Championship club which were completed after the end of the winter 2014–15 transfer window and before the end of the 2015 summer window

Players without a club could join at any time, and clubs below Premier League level could sign players on loan during loan windows. Clubs could be permitted to sign a goalkeeper on an emergency loan if they had no registered goalkeeper available.

== Transfers ==
All clubs without a flag are English. Note that while Cardiff City and Swansea City are affiliated with the Football Association of Wales and thus take the Welsh flag, they play in the English football league system, and so their transfers are included here.

| Date | Name | Moving from | Moving to | Fee |
|---|---|---|---|---|
| 3 February 2015 | (Brazil) Anderson | Manchester United | (Brazil) Internacional | Free |
| 3 February 2015 | (England) Roger Johnson | Unattached | Charlton Athletic | Free |
| 10 February 2015 | (England) Tareiq Holmes-Dennis | Charlton Athletic | Plymouth Argyle | Loan |
| 10 February 2015 | (England) Gary Madine | Sheffield Wednesday | Blackpool | Loan |
| 10 February 2015 | (England) Harry Maguire | Hull City | Wigan Athletic | Loan |
| 10 February 2015 | (England) Jack O'Connell | Brentford | Rochdale | Loan |
| 12 February 2015 | (England) Ryan Inniss | Crystal Palace | Port Vale | Loan |
| 12 February 2015 | (Republic of Ireland) Rob Kiernan | Wigan Athletic | Birmingham City | Loan |
| 12 February 2015 | (Italy) Dani Osvaldo | Southampton | (Argentina) Boca Juniors | Loan |
| 13 February 2015 | (England) Jordan Jones | Middlesbrough | Hartlepool United | Loan |
| 13 February 2015 | (England) Kemar Roofe | West Bromwich Albion | Oxford United | Loan |
| 14 February 2015 | (Northern Ireland) Cameron McGeehan | Norwich City | Luton Town | Loan |
| 16 February 2015 | (Wales) George Williams | Fulham | Milton Keynes Dons | Loan |
| 17 February 2015 | (Scotland) Graham Dorrans | West Bromwich Albion | Norwich City | Loan |
| 17 February 2015 | (Wales) Josh Sheehan | (Wales) Swansea City | Yeovil Town | Loan |
| 18 February 2015 | (Scotland) Stephen Kingsley | (Wales) Swansea City | Yeovil Town | Loan |
| 19 February 2015 | (England) Chris Eagles | Unattached | Charlton Athletic | Free |
| 19 February 2015 | (Argentina) Emmanuel Ledesma | Middlesbrough | Brighton & Hove Albion | Loan |
| 19 February 2015 | (England) Elliot Lee | West Ham United | Luton Town | Loan |
| 19 February 2015 | (Republic of Ireland) John O'Sullivan | Blackburn Rovers | Barnsley | Loan |
| 19 February 2015 | (England) Byron Webster | Millwall | Yeovil Town | Loan |
| 20 February 2015 | (England) Richard Chaplow | Millwall | Ipswich Town | Loan |
| 20 February 2015 | (England) Jeffrey Monakana | Brighton & Hove Albion | Mansfield Town | Loan |
| 20 February 2015 | (England) Gary Taylor-Fletcher | Leicester City | Millwall | Loan |
| 20 February 2015 | (England) Richard Wood | Rotherham United | Crawley Town | Loan |
| 21 February 2015 | (Northern Ireland) Paddy McCourt | Brighton & Hove Albion | Notts County | Loan |
| 21 February 2015 | (England) Jermaine Pennant | Unattached | Wigan Athletic | Free |
| 21 February 2015 | (Switzerland) Raphael Spiegel | West Ham United | Carlisle United | Loan |
| 23 February 2015 | (France) Alou Diarra | Unattached | Charlton Athletic | Free |
| 24 February 2015 | (England) Oliver Burke | Nottingham Forest | Bradford City | Loan |
| 25 February 2015 | (England) Lewis Baker | Chelsea | Milton Keynes Dons | Loan |
| 26 February 2015 | (England) Liam Moore | Leicester City | Brentford | Loan |
| 26 February 2015 | (Italy) Marco Motta | Unattached | Watford | Free |
| 26 February 2015 | (England) Luke O'Neill | Burnley | Leyton Orient | Loan |
| 27 February 2015 | (England) Adam Chicksen | Brentford | Fleetwood Town | Loan |
| 27 February 2015 | (Republic of Ireland) Shamir Fenelon | Brighton & Hove Albion | Dagenham & Redbridge | Loan |
| 27 February 2015 | (Algeria) Adlène Guedioura | Crystal Palace | Watford | Loan |
| 27 February 2015 | (Germany) Nick Proschwitz | Brentford | Coventry City | Loan |
| 27 February 2015 | (England) Sam Saunders | Brentford | Wycombe Wanderers | Loan |
| 27 February 2015 | (New Zealand) Chris Wood | Leicester City | Ipswich Town | Loan |
| 27 February 2015 | (Northern Ireland) Nico Yennaris | Brentford | Wycombe Wanderers | Loan |
| 28 February 2015 | (England) Conor Townsend | Hull City | Scunthorpe United | Loan |
| 2 March 2015 | (England) Scott Loach | Rotherham United | Yeovil Town | Loan |
| 2 March 2015 | (Germany) Robert Tesche | Nottingham Forest | Birmingham City | Loan |
| 4 March 2015 | (England) Miles Addison | Bournemouth | Blackpool | Loan |
| 5 March 2015 | (England) Giles Coke | Sheffield Wednesday | Bolton Wanderers | Loan |
| 5 March 2015 | (Northern Ireland) Daniel Lafferty | Burnley | Rotherham United | Loan |
| 6 March 2015 | (England) Steve Davies | Blackpool | Sheffield United | Loan |
| 6 March 2015 | (England) Jason Gilchrist | Burnley | Accrington Stanley | Loan |
| 6 March 2015 | (Wales) Declan John | (Wales) Cardiff City | Barnsley | Loan |
| 7 March 2015 | (England) Farrend Rawson | Derby County | Rotherham United | Loan |
| 10 March 2015 | (Republic of Ireland) Paddy McCarthy | Crystal Palace | Bolton Wanderers | Loan |
| 10 March 2015 | (Norway) Fredrik Ulvestad | Unattached | Burnley | Free |
| 11 March 2015 | (England) Ollie Muldoon | Charlton Athletic | Gillingham | Loan |
| 11 March 2015 | (United States) Will Packwood | Birmingham City | Cheltenham Town | Loan |
| 11 March 2015 | (Republic of Ireland) Callum Reilly | Birmingham City | Burton Albion | Loan |
| 12 March 2015 | (Sweden) Modou Barrow | (Wales) Swansea City | Nottingham Forest | Loan |
| 12 March 2015 | (England) Jonson Clarke-Harris | Rotherham United | Doncaster Rovers | Loan |
| 12 March 2015 | (England) Michael Jacobs | Wolverhampton Wanderers | Blackpool | Loan |
| 12 March 2015 | (England) Lloyd Jones | Liverpool | Accrington Stanley | Loan |
| 12 March 2015 | (England) Zat Knight | Unattached | Reading | Free |
| 12 March 2015 | (Wales) Tommy O'Sullivan | (Wales) Cardiff City | Port Vale | Loan |
| 12 March 2015 | (England) Michael Turner | Norwich City | Fulham | Loan |
| 13 March 2015 | (England) Jak Alnwick | Newcastle United | Bradford City | Loan |
| 13 March 2015 | (Republic of Ireland) Paul Corry | Sheffield Wednesday | Carlisle United | Loan |
| 13 March 2015 | (Jamaica) Shaq Coulthirst | Tottenham Hotspur | York City | Loan |
| 13 March 2015 | (Scotland) Uche Ikpeazu | Watford | Crewe Alexandra | Loan |
| 13 March 2015 | (England) Jonathon Margetts | Hull City | Cambridge United | Loan |
| 13 March 2015 | (England) Mat Sadler | Rotherham United | Oldham Athletic | Loan |
| 13 March 2015 | (Northern Ireland) Rhys Sharpe | Derby County | Shrewsbury Town | Loan |
| 13 March 2015 | (England) Grant Ward | Tottenham Hotspur | Coventry City | Loan |
| 13 March 2015 | (England) Luke Woodland | Bolton Wanderers | Oldham Athletic | Loan |
| 14 March 2015 | (South Africa) Bongani Khumalo | Tottenham Hotspur | Colchester United | Loan |
| 14 March 2015 | (England) Jacob Murphy | Norwich City | Colchester United | Loan |
| 16 March 2015 | (England) Josh Murphy | Norwich City | Wigan Athletic | Loan |
| 16 March 2015^{[a]} | (Italy) Davide Santon | Newcastle United | (Italy) Inter Milan | £3.3m |
| 16 March 2015 | (England) Jerome Sinclair | Liverpool | Wigan Athletic | Loan |
| 17 March 2015 | (Wales) David Cornell | (Wales) Swansea City | Portsmouth | Loan |
| 18 March 2015 | (Wales) Lloyd Isgrove | Southampton | Sheffield Wednesday | Loan |
| 19 March 2015 | (England) Matthew Connolly | (Wales) Cardiff City | Watford | Loan |
| 19 March 2015 | (Republic of Ireland) Anthony Gerrard | Huddersfield Town | Oldham Athletic | Loan |
| 19 March 2015 | (England) Cole Kpekawa | Queens Park Rangers | Portsmouth | Loan |
| 19 March 2015 | (England) John Lundstram | Everton | Scunthorpe United | Loan |
| 19 March 2015 | (Jamaica) Nyron Nosworthy | Blackpool | Portsmouth | Loan |
| 20 March 2015 | (England) Amari'i Bell | Birmingham City | Gillingham | Loan |
| 20 March 2015 | (Argentina) Emiliano Martínez | Arsenal | Rotherham United | Loan |
| 20 March 2015 | (Wales) Danny Ward | Liverpool | Morecambe | Loan |
| 20 March 2015 | (England) Lawrie Wilson | Charlton Athletic | Rotherham United | Loan |
| 21 March 2015 | (Wales) Sam Ricketts | Wolverhampton Wanderers | Swindon Town | Loan |
| 21 March 2015 | (England) Cameron Stewart | Ipswich Town | Barnsley | Loan |
| 25 March 2015 | (Venezuela) Fernando Amorebieta | Fulham | Middlesbrough | Loan |
| 25 March 2015 | (England) James Husband | Middlesbrough | Fulham | Loan |
| 25 March 2015 | (Wales) Gethin Jones | Everton | Plymouth Argyle | Loan |
| 26 March 2015 | (Netherlands) Nathan Aké | Chelsea | Reading | Loan |
| 26 March 2015 | (England) Chuba Akpom | Arsenal | Nottingham Forest | Loan |
| 26 March 2015 | (England) Zak Ansah | Charlton Athletic | Plymouth Argyle | Loan |
| 26 March 2015 | (Ghana) Kwesi Appiah | Crystal Palace | Reading | Loan |
| 26 March 2015 | (England) David Atkinson | Middlesbrough | Carlisle United | Loan |
| 26 March 2015 | (England) Richard Brindley | Rotherham United | Colchester United | Loan |
| 26 March 2015 | (Republic of Ireland) Graham Burke | Aston Villa | Notts County | Loan |
| 26 March 2015 | (The Gambia) Mustapha Carayol | Middlesbrough | Brighton & Hove Albion | Loan |
| 26 March 2015 | (Senegal) Mohamed Coulibaly | Bournemouth | Port Vale | Loan |
| 26 March 2015 | (England) Jack Dunn | Liverpool | Burton Albion | Loan |
| 26 March 2015 | (Italy) Diego Fabbrini | Watford | Birmingham City | Loan |
| 26 March 2015 | (England) Jon Flatt | Wolverhampton Wanderers | Chesterfield | Loan |
| 26 March 2015 | (England) Zeki Fryers | Crystal Palace | Ipswich Town | Loan |
| 26 March 2015 | (England) George Green | Everton | Tranmere Rovers | Loan |
| 26 March 2015 | (England) Danny Guthrie | Reading | Fulham | Loan |
| 26 March 2015 | (England) Robert Hall | Bolton Wanderers | Milton Keynes Dons | Loan |
| 26 March 2015 | (England) Rob Holding | Bolton Wanderers | Bury | Loan |
| 26 March 2015 | (England) Reece James | Manchester United | Huddersfield Town | Loan |
| 26 March 2015 | (England) Jack Jebb | Arsenal | Stevenage | Loan |
| 26 March 2015 | (England) Ryan Jennings | Wigan Athletic | Accrington Stanley | Loan |
| 26 March 2015 | (Scotland) Denny Johnstone | Birmingham City | Burton Albion | Loan |
| 26 March 2015 | (Trinidad and Tobago) Kenwyne Jones | (Wales) Cardiff City | Bournemouth | Loan |
| 26 March 2015 | (Guinea-Bissau) Francisco Júnior | Everton | Port Vale | Loan |
| 26 March 2015 | (England) Lewis Kinsella | Aston Villa | Luton Town | Loan |
| 26 March 2015 | (England) Richard Lee | Brentford | Fulham | Loan |
| 26 March 2015 | (England) Jordan Lussey | Liverpool | Bolton Wanderers | Loan |
| 26 March 2015 | (England) Shaq McDonald | Derby County | Cheltenham Town | Loan |
| 26 March 2015 | (Republic of Ireland) Stephen McLaughlin | Nottingham Forest | Southend United | Loan |
| 26 March 2015 | (England) Tony McMahon | Blackpool | Bradford City | Loan |
| 26 March 2015 | (England) Jeffrey Monakana | Brighton & Hove Albion | Carlisle United | Loan |
| 26 March 2015 | (Republic of Ireland) Josh O'Hanlon | Bournemouth | York City | Loan |
| 26 March 2015 | (England) James Pearson | Leicester City | Peterborough United | Loan |
| 26 March 2015 | (England) Kevin Stewart | Liverpool | Burton Albion | Loan |
| 26 March 2015 | (Wales) Jake Taylor | Reading | Leyton Orient | Loan |
| 26 March 2015 | (England) Paul Taylor | Ipswich Town | Blackburn Rovers | Loan |
| 26 March 2015 | (Netherlands) Dwight Tiendalli | (Wales) Swansea City | Middlesbrough | Loan |
| 26 March 2015 | (England) Joe Wildsmith | Sheffield Wednesday | Barnsley | Loan |
| 26 March 2015 | (Wales) Jonathan Williams | Crystal Palace | Ipswich Town | Loan |
| 26 March 2015 | (Wales) Jordan Williams | Liverpool | Notts County | Loan |
| 26 March 2015 | (England) Luke Williams | Middlesbrough | Peterborough United | Loan |
| 9 May 2015 | (Republic of Ireland) Joe Murphy | Huddersfield Town | Chesterfield | Loan |
| 12 May 2015 | (England) Kemar Roofe | West Bromwich Albion | Oxford United | Undisclosed |
| 14 May 2015^{[a]} | (Brazil) Nathan | (Brazil) Atlético Paranaense | Chelsea | £4.5m |
| 16 May 2015^{[a]} | (Germany) Akaki Gogia | (Germany) Hallescher FC | Brentford | Free |
| 19 May 2015 | (England) Alex Jones | Unattached | Birmingham City | Free |
| 19 May 2015 | (England) Scott Sinclair | Manchester City | Aston Villa | £2.5m |
| 21 May 2015 | (England) Jed Wallace | Portsmouth | Wolverhampton Wanderers | Undisclosed |
| 21 May 2015 | (Germany) Philipp Wollscheid | (Germany) Bayer Leverkusen | Stoke City | £2.75m |
| 26 May 2015 | (Poland) Artur Boruc | Southampton | Bournemouth | Free |
| 27 May 2015 | (Scotland) Graham Dorrans | West Bromwich Albion | Norwich City | Undisclosed |
| 27 May 2015^{[a]} | (Australia) Adam Federici | Unattached | Bournemouth | Free |
| 27 May 2015 | (Denmark) Jakob Haugaard | (Denmark) Midtjylland | Watford | Undisclosed |
| 28 May 2015 | (England) Ben Gladwin | Swindon Town | Queens Park Rangers | Undisclosed |
| 28 May 2015 | (Norway) Joshua King | Blackburn Rovers | Bournemouth | Free |
| 28 May 2015 | (Australia) Massimo Luongo | Swindon Town | Queens Park Rangers | Undisclosed |
| 28 May 2015 | (Wales) Joe Walsh | Crawley Town | Milton Keynes Dons | Undisclosed |
| 29 May 2015 | (Ghana) Christian Atsu | Chelsea | Bournemouth | Loan |
| 29 May 2015 | (Austria) Kevin Wimmer | (Germany) 1. FC Köln | Tottenham Hotspur | £4.3m |
| 30 May 2015^{[a]} | (Republic of Ireland) Darren Randolph | Unattached | West Ham United | Free |
| 1 June 2015 | (Austria) Sebastian Prödl | Unattached | Watford | Free |
| 2 June 2015 | (Belgium) Dedryck Boyata | Manchester City | (Scotland) Celtic | £1.5m |
| 2 June 2015 | (Sweden) Tim Erlandsson | (Sweden) Halmstad | Nottingham Forest | Undisclosed |
| 2 June 2015^{[a]} | (Northern Ireland) Cameron McGeehan | Norwich City | Luton Town | Undisclosed |
| 3 June 2015^{[a]} | (Austria) Christian Fuchs | Unattached | Leicester City | Free |
| 4 June 2015 | (Lithuania) Giedrius Arlauskis | Unattached | Watford | Free |
| 4 June 2015^{[a]} | (England) James Milner | Manchester City | Liverpool | Free |
| 5 June 2015^{[a]} | (England) Tom Cleverley | Unattached | Everton | Free |
| 8 June 2015 | (Jamaica) Jermaine Beckford | Bolton Wanderers | Preston North End | Free |
| 8 June 2015^{[a]} | (England) Darren Bent | Unattached | Derby County | Free |
| 8 June 2015^{[a]} | (England) Danny Ings | Burnley | Liverpool | Tribunal |
| 8 June 2015^{[a]} | (Spain) Álvaro Negredo | Manchester City | (Spain) Valencia | £22m |
| 8 June 2015^{[a]} | (Republic of Ireland) Alex Pearce | Unattached | Derby County | Free |
| 9 June 2015 | (United States) Charlie Horton | (Wales) Cardiff City | Leeds United | Free |
| 10 June 2015 | (Spain) Pedro Obiang | (Italy) Sampdoria | West Ham United | Undisclosed |
| 10 June 2015 | (Ghana) André Ayew | Unattached | (Wales) Swansea City | Free |
| 10 June 2015 | (Scotland) Lee Erwin | (Scotland) Motherwell | Leeds United | Undisclosed |
| 11 June 2015^{[a]} | (England) Ryan Williams | Unattached | Brentford | Free |
| 12 June 2015 | (Spain) Iago Aspas | Liverpool | (Spain) Celta | £5m |
| 12 June 2015^{[a]} | (Hungary) Ádám Bogdán | Unattached | Liverpool | Free |
| 12 June 2015 | (England) Scott Carson | Wigan Athletic | Derby County | Undisclosed |
| 12 June 2015 | (Netherlands) Memphis Depay | (Netherlands) PSV | Manchester United | £31m |
| 12 June 2015^{[a]} | (England) Joe Mattock | Unattached | Rotherham United | Free |
| 12 June 2015^{[a]} | (Wales) Craig Morgan | Unattached | Wigan Athletic | Free |
| 12 June 2015^{[a]} | (England) Jay Emmanuel-Thomas | Unattached | Queens Park Rangers | Free |
| 16 June 2015 | (Scotland) Paul Gallagher | Unattached | Preston North End | Free |
| 16 June 2015 | (Spain) Joselu | (Germany) Hannover 96 | Stoke City | £5.75m |
| 16 June 2015 | (Spain) Juanmi | (Spain) Málaga | Southampton | £5m |
| 16 June 2015 | (Scotland) Jamie Mackie | Unattached | Queens Park Rangers | Free |
| 17 June 2015 | (Belgium) Christophe Lepoint | Charlton Athletic | (Belgium) Zulte Waregem | Undisclosed |
| 17 June 2015^{[a]} | (England) Micah Richards | Unattached | Aston Villa | Free |
| 18 June 2015^{[a]} | (Nigeria) Semi Ajayi | Unattached | (Wales) Cardiff City | Free |
| 18 June 2015 | (Portugal) Cédric | (Portugal) Sporting Lisbon | Southampton | £4.7m |
| 18 June 2015 | (Austria) Andreas Weimann | Aston Villa | Derby County | Undisclosed |
| 19 June 2015^{[a]} | (Northern Ireland) Chris Baird | Unattached | Derby County | Free |
| 19 June 2015 | (France) Gaël Kakuta | Chelsea | (Spain) Sevilla | £5.2m |
| 19 June 2015^{[a]} | (England) Andy Lonergan | Unattached | Fulham | Free |
| 19 June 2015^{[a]} | (England) Ben Pringle | Unattached | Fulham | Free |
| 19 June 2015 | (France) Franck Tabanou | (France) Saint-Étienne | (Wales) Swansea City | Undisclosed |
| 19 June 2015 | (England) Kieran Trippier | Burnley | Tottenham Hotspur | £3.5m |
| 20 June 2015 | (England) Joe Gomez | Charlton Athletic | Liverpool | £3.5m |
| 22 June 2015 | (Republic of Ireland) Rob Kiernan | Wigan Athletic | (Scotland) Rangers | Undisclosed |
| 22 June 2015 | (England) Matthew Lowton | Aston Villa | Burnley | Undisclosed |
| 22 June 2015 | (Republic of Ireland) James McClean | Wigan Athletic | West Bromwich Albion | £1.5m |
| 22 June 2015^{[a]} | (Democratic Republic of the Congo) Youssouf Mulumbu | Unattached | Norwich City | Free |
| 22 June 2015 | (Netherlands) Maarten Stekelenburg | Fulham | Southampton | Loan |
| 22 June 2015 | (Mali) Yacouba Sylla | Aston Villa | (France) Rennes | Undisclosed |
| 23 June 2015 | (Germany) Patrick Bauer | (Portugal) Marítimo | Charlton Athletic | Undisclosed |
| 23 June 2015^{[a]} | (England) Jake Cassidy | Wolverhampton Wanderers | Oldham Athletic | Free |
| 23 June 2015 | (England) Mandela Egbo | Crystal Palace | (Germany) Borussia Mönchengladbach | Undisclosed |
| 23 June 2015 | (Sweden) Kristoffer Nordfeldt | (Netherlands) Heerenveen | (Wales) Swansea City | Undisclosed |
| 23 June 2015^{[a]} | (England) Liam Rosenior | Unattached | Brighton & Hove Albion | Free |
| 23 June 2015^{[a]} | (England) Dean Whitehead | Unattached | Huddersfield Town | Free |
| 23 June 2015^{[a]} | (Wales) Josh Yorwerth | Unattached | Ipswich Town | Free |
| 24 June 2015 | (Ivory Coast) Sol Bamba | (Italy) Palermo | Leeds United | Undisclosed |
| 24 June 2015 | (Brazil) Roberto Firmino | (Germany) TSG Hoffenheim | Liverpool | £29m |
| 24 June 2015 | (Israel) Tomer Hemed | (Spain) Almería | Brighton & Hove Albion | Undisclosed |
| 24 June 2015 | (Germany) Robert Huth | Stoke City | Leicester City | £3m |
| 25 June 2015^{[a]} | (Denmark) Mikkel Andersen | Reading | (Denmark) Midtjylland | Free |
| 25 June 2015 | (France) Yoann Barbet | (France) Chamois Niortais | Brentford | Undisclosed |
| 25 June 2015^{[a]} | (England) Lewis Buxton | Unattached | Rotherham United | Free |
| 25 June 2015 | (Spain) Gerard Deulofeu | (Spain) Barcelona | Everton | £4.3m |
| 25 June 2015 | (Curaçao) Darryl Lachman | (Netherlands) Twente | Sheffield Wednesday | Undisclosed |
| 26 June 2015 | (England) Lewis Baker | Chelsea | (Netherlands) Vitesse | Loan |
| 26 June 2015 | (Scotland) Tom Cairney | Blackburn Rovers | Fulham | Undisclosed |
| 26 June 2015 | (Australia) Jason Davidson | Unattached | Huddersfield Town | Free |
| 26 June 2015 | (Scotland) Ryan Fraser | Bournemouth | Ipswich Town | Loan |
| 26 June 2015 | (Democratic Republic of the Congo) Jacques Maghoma | Unattached | Birmingham City | Free |
| 26 June 2015 | (England) Tyrone Mings | Ipswich Town | Bournemouth | Undisclosed |
| 26 June 2015 | (Japan) Shinji Okazaki | (Germany) 1. FSV Mainz 05 | Leicester City | £7m |
| 26 June 2015 | (France) Dimitri Payet | (France) Marseille | West Ham United | Undisclosed |
| 26 June 2015 | (England) Brett Pitman | Bournemouth | Ipswich Town | Undisclosed |
| 26 June 2015 | (Wales) Danny Ward | Liverpool | (Scotland) Aberdeen | Loan |
| 27 June 2015 | (England) Adam Legzdins | Unattached | Birmingham City | Free |
| 29 June 2015 | (Iceland) Kári Árnason | Rotherham United | (Sweden) Malmö | Undisclosed |
| 29 June 2015 | (France) El Hadji Ba | Sunderland | Charlton Athletic | Undisclosed |
| 29 June 2015 | (Czech Republic) Petr Čech | Chelsea | Arsenal | £10m |
| 29 June 2015 | (Brazil) Paulinho | Tottenham Hotspur | (China) Guangzhou Evergrande | £9.9m |
| 29 June 2015 | (Portugal) Orlando Sá | (Poland) Legia Warsaw | Reading | Undisclosed |
| 30 June 2015 | (England) George Baldock | Milton Keynes Dons | Oxford United | Loan |
| 30 June 2015 | (Wales) Simon Church | Unattached | Milton Keynes Dons | Free |
| 30 June 2015 | (United States) Cody Cropper | Unattached | Milton Keynes Dons | Free |
| 30 June 2015^{[a]} | (Montserrat) Donervon Daniels | West Bromwich Albion | Wigan Athletic | Undisclosed |
| 30 June 2015 | (England) Dale Jennings | Unattached | Milton Keynes Dons | Free |
| 30 June 2015^{[a]} | (Spain) Juanfran | (Spain) Betis | Watford | £1.5m |
| 30 June 2015^{[a]} | (Netherlands) Karim Rekik | Manchester City | (France) Marseille | £3.9m |
| 30 June 2015 | (France) Vincent Sasso | (Portugal) Braga | Sheffield Wednesday | Loan |
| 30 June 2015 | (Netherlands) Lars Veldwijk | Nottingham Forest | (Netherlands) Zwolle | Loan |
| 30 June 2015 | (Republic of Ireland) Stephen Quinn | Unattached | Reading | Free |
| 1 July 2015 | (England) Ben Amos | Manchester United | Bolton Wanderers | Free |
| 1 July 2015 | (England) Stephen Arthurworrey | Fulham | Yeovil Town | Loan |
| 1 July 2015 | (England) Nathaniel Clyne | Southampton | Liverpool | £12.5m |
| 1 July 2015 | (Uruguay) Sebastian Coates | Liverpool | Sunderland | Undisclosed |
| 1 July 2015 | (France) Sylvain Distin | Unattached | Bournemouth | Free |
| 1 July 2015 | (Portugal) Éder | (Portugal) Braga | (Wales) Swansea City | Undisclosed |
| 1 July 2015 | (Belgium) Thorgan Hazard | Chelsea | (Germany) Borussia Mönchengladbach | £5.9m |
| 1 July 2015 | (Germany) Lewis Holtby | Tottenham Hotspur | (Germany) Hamburger SV | £4.6m |
| 1 July 2015 | (Switzerland) Saidy Janko | Manchester United | (Scotland) Celtic | Free |
| 1 July 2015 | (Austria) Konstantin Kerschbaumer | (Austria) Admira | Brentford | Undisclosed |
| 1 July 2015 | (Poland) Tomasz Kuszczak | Wolverhampton Wanderers | Birmingham City | Free |
| 1 July 2015 | (England) Gary Madine | Unattached | Bolton Wanderers | Free |
| 1 July 2015 | (Denmark) Simon Makienok | (Italy) Palermo | Charlton Athletic | Loan |
| 1 July 2015 | (England) Matt Mills | Unattached | Nottingham Forest | Free |
| 1 July 2015 | (England) Alex Palmer | West Bromwich Albion | Kidderminster Harriers | Loan |
| 1 July 2015 | (Czech Republic) Matěj Vydra | (Italy) Udinese | Watford | Undisclosed |
| 1 July 2015 | (New Zealand) Chris Wood | Leicester City | Leeds United | £3m |
| 2 July 2015 | (Denmark) Andreas Bjelland | (Netherlands) Twente | Brentford | £2.1m |
| 2 July 2015 | (Cameroon) Gaëtan Bong | Unattached | Brighton & Hove Albion | Free |
| 2 July 2015 | (Germany) Max Ehmer | Queens Park Rangers | Gillingham | Free |
| 2 July 2015 | (Greece) José Holebas | (Italy) Roma | Watford | £1.8m |
| 2 July 2015 | (Argentina) Emmanuel Ledesma | Unattached | Rotherham United | Free |
| 2 July 2015 | (England) Ainsley Maitland-Niles | Arsenal | Ipswich Town | Loan |
| 2 July 2015 | (Republic of Ireland) Paul McShane | Unattached | Reading | Free |
| 2 July 2015 | (England) Karleigh Osborne | Bristol City | AFC Wimbledon | Loan |
| 2 July 2015 | (Germany) Sebastian Polter | (Germany) 1. FSV Mainz 05 | Queens Park Rangers | Undisclosed |
| 2 July 2015 | (Wales) Jazz Richards | (Wales) Swansea City | Fulham | Undisclosed |
| 2 July 2015 | (Northern Ireland) Jamie Ward | Unattached | Nottingham Forest | Free |
| 3 July 2015 | (England) Conor Coady | Huddersfield Town | Wolverhampton Wanderers | £2m |
| 3 July 2015 | (Wales) Danny Collins | Unattached | Rotherham United | Free |
| 3 July 2015 | (England) Mark Duffy | Birmingham City | Burton Albion | Loan |
| 3 July 2015 | (Colombia) Radamel Falcao | (France) Monaco | Chelsea | Loan |
| 3 July 2015 | (Belgium) David Henen | (Greece) Olympiacos | Everton | £200,000 |
| 3 July 2015 | (England) Jack Hunt | Crystal Palace | Sheffield Wednesday | Loan |
| 3 July 2015 | (England) Tom Ince | Hull City | Derby County | £4.75m |
| 3 July 2015 | (Croatia) Mario Pašalić | Chelsea | (France) Monaco | Loan |
| 3 July 2015 | (Wales) Adam Matthews | (Scotland) Celtic | Sunderland | £2m |
| 3 July 2015 | (England) Tom Thorpe | Unattached | Rotherham United | Free |
| 4 July 2015 | (England) Jonathan Bond | Watford | Reading | Undisclosed |
| 4 July 2015 | (Germany) Lukas Podolski | Arsenal | (Turkey) Galatasaray | £1.8m |
| 6 July 2015 | (England) Alex Baptiste | Bolton Wanderers | Middlesbrough | Undisclosed |
| 6 July 2015 | (France) Étienne Capoue | Tottenham Hotspur | Watford | £6.3m |
| 6 July 2015 | (England) Greg Halford | Unattached | Rotherham United | Free |
| 6 July 2015 | (Chile) Ángelo Henríquez | Manchester United | (Croatia) Dinamo Zagreb | Undisclosed |
| 6 July 2015 | (Scotland) Adam King | (Wales) Swansea City | Crewe Alexandra | Loan |
| 6 July 2015 | (Finland) Niki Mäenpää | Unattached | Brighton & Hove Albion | Free |
| 6 July 2015 | (England) Remi Matthews | Norwich City | Burton Albion | Loan |
| 6 July 2015 | (Portugal) Nani | Manchester United | (Turkey) Fenerbahçe | £4.25m |
| 6 July 2015 | (England) Sanmi Odelusi | Bolton Wanderers | Wigan Athletic | Undisclosed |
| 6 July 2015 | (Spain) Derik Osede | Unattached | Bolton Wanderers | Free |
| 6 July 2015 | (Turkey) Enes Ünal | (Turkey) Bursaspor | Manchester City | Undisclosed |
| 7 July 2015 | (Nigeria) Sammy Ameobi | Newcastle United | (Wales) Cardiff City | Loan |
| 7 July 2015 | (England) Jamie O'Hara | Unattached | Fulham | Free |
| 7 July 2015 | (Curaçao) Cuco Martina | (Netherlands) Twente | Southampton | Undisclosed |
| 7 July 2015 | (Scotland) George McLennan | Reading | Cheltenham Town | Free |
| 7 July 2015 | (Costa Rica) Bryan Ruiz | Fulham | (Portugal) Sporting Lisbon | £1.5m |
| 7 July 2015 | (England) Jayden Stockley | Bournemouth | Portsmouth | Loan |
| 7 July 2015 | (Belgium) Jelle Vossen | (Belgium) Genk | Burnley | £2.5m |
| 8 July 2015 | (Belgium) Toby Alderweireld | (Spain) Atlético Madrid | Tottenham Hotspur | £11.5m |
| 8 July 2015 | (Turkey) Jem Karacan | Reading | (Turkey) Galatasaray | Free |
| 8 July 2015 | (England) Will Keane | Manchester United | Preston North End | Loan |
| 9 July 2015 | (England) Mark Bunn | Unattached | Aston Villa | Free |
| 9 July 2015 | (Netherlands) Kenji Gorré | (Wales) Swansea City | (Netherlands) ADO Den Haag | Loan |
| 9 July 2015 | (Portugal) Marco Matias | (Portugal) Nacional | Sheffield Wednesday | Undisclosed |
| 9 July 2015 | (Republic of Ireland) Liam McAlinden | Wolverhampton Wanderers | Shrewsbury Town | Loan |
| 9 July 2015 | (France) Steven Nzonzi | Stoke City | (Spain) Sevilla | £7m |
| 10 July 2015 | (France) Yohan Cabaye | (France) Paris Saint-Germain | Crystal Palace | £10m |
| 10 July 2015 | (England) Tyler Blackwood | Unattached | Queens Park Rangers | Free |
| 10 July 2015 | (England) Isaiah Brown | Chelsea | (Netherlands) Vitesse | Loan |
| 10 July 2015 | (Denmark) Andreas Christensen | Chelsea | (Germany) Borussia Mönchengladbach | Loan |
| 10 July 2015 | (England) Kyle Dempsey | Carlisle United | Huddersfield Town | Undisclosed |
| 10 July 2015 | (France) David Faupala | (France) Lens | Manchester City | Free |
| 10 July 2015 | (Republic of Ireland) Shay Given | Aston Villa | Stoke City | Free |
| 10 July 2015 | (Senegal) Idrissa Gueye | (France) Lille | Aston Villa | Undisclosed |
| 10 July 2015 | (Republic of Ireland) Michael Harriman | Queens Park Rangers | Wycombe Wanderers | Loan |
| 10 July 2015 | (England) Lloyd Jones | Liverpool | Blackpool | Loan |
| 10 July 2015 | (Spain) Álex López | (Spain) Celta Vigo | Sheffield Wednesday | Loan |
| 10 July 2015 | (England) Josh McEachran | Chelsea | Brentford | £750,000 |
| 10 July 2015 | (Brazil) Nathan | Chelsea | (Netherlands) Vitesse | Loan |
| 10 July 2015 | (Italy) Angelo Ogbonna | (Italy) Juventus | West Ham United | £10m |
| 10 July 2015 | (Wales) Lewis Price | Unattached | Sheffield Wednesday | Free |
| 10 July 2015 | (Netherlands) Marco van Ginkel | Chelsea | Stoke City | Loan |
| 10 July 2015 | (Scotland) Ross Wallace | Unattached | Sheffield Wednesday | Free |
| 10 July 2015 | (Republic of Ireland) Conor Wilkinson | Bolton Wanderers | Barnsley | Loan |
| 10 July 2015 | (Wales) Jordan Williams | Liverpool | Swindon Town | Loan |
| 11 July 2015 | (Switzerland) Valon Behrami | (Germany) Hamburger SV | Watford | Undisclosed |
| 11 July 2015 | (Italy) Matteo Darmian | (Italy) Torino | Manchester United | £12.7m |
| 11 July 2015 | (England) Kevin Stewart | Liverpool | Swindon Town | Loan |
| 11 July 2015 | (Netherlands) Georginio Wijnaldum | (Netherlands) PSV | Newcastle United | £14.5m |
| 12 July 2015 | (England) Glen Johnson | Unattached | Stoke City | Free |
| 13 July 2015 | (Bosnia and Herzegovina) Asmir Begović | Stoke City | Chelsea | £8m |
| 13 July 2015 | (Italy) Filippo Costa | (Italy) Chievo | Bournemouth | Loan |
| 13 July 2015 | (England) Peter Denton | Rotherham United | Hartlepool United | Free |
| 13 July 2015 | (England) Uche Ikpeazu | Watford | Port Vale | Loan |
| 13 July 2015 | (Scotland) Oli McBurnie | Bradford City | (Wales) Swansea City | Undisclosed |
| 13 July 2015 | (Serbia) Danilo Pantić | (Serbia) Partizan | Chelsea | £1.25m |
| 13 July 2015 | (Serbia) Danilo Pantić | Chelsea | (Netherlands) Vitesse | Loan |
| 13 July 2015 | (France) Morgan Schneiderlin | Southampton | Manchester United | £25m |
| 13 July 2015 | (Germany) Bastian Schweinsteiger | (Germany) Bayern Munich | Manchester United | £14.4m |
| 13 July 2015 | (England) Grant Ward | Tottenham Hotspur | Rotherham United | Loan |
| 14 July 2015 | (England) Tom Adeyemi | (Wales) Cardiff City | Leeds United | Loan |
| 14 July 2015 | (Ivory Coast) Victorien Angban | Chelsea | (Belgium) Sint-Truiden | Loan |
| 14 July 2015 | (Oman) Ali Al-Habsi | Unattached | Reading | Free |
| 14 July 2015 | (Northern Ireland) Will Grigg | Brentford | Wigan Athletic | £1m |
| 14 July 2015 | (England) Carl Jenkinson | Arsenal | West Ham United | Loan |
| 14 July 2015 | (Cameroon) Allan Nyom | (Italy) Udinese | Watford | Undisclosed |
| 14 July 2015 | (Netherlands) Robin van Persie | Manchester United | (Turkey) Fenerbahçe | £4.2m |
| 14 July 2015 | (England) Raheem Sterling | Liverpool | Manchester City | £44m |
| 15 July 2015 | (Netherlands) Jordy Clasie | (Netherlands) Feyenoord | Southampton | £8m |
| 15 July 2015 | (Morocco) Moha El Ouriachi | (Spain) Barcelona B | Stoke City | Free |
| 15 July 2015 | (Netherlands) Jeremain Lens | (Ukraine) Dynamo Kyiv | Sunderland | £8m |
| 15 July 2015 | (England) Carlton Morris | Norwich City | (Scotland) Hamilton | Loan |
| 15 July 2015 | (England) Farrend Rawson | Derby County | Rotherham United | Loan |
| 15 July 2015 | (Netherlands) Kelle Roos | Derby County | Rotherham United | Loan |
| 15 July 2015 | (Uruguay) Christian Stuani | (Spain) Espanyol | Middlesbrough | £2.8m |
| 15 July 2015 | (England) Ross Turnbull | Barnsley | Leeds United | Free |
| 16 July 2015 | (England) Stewart Downing | West Ham United | Middlesbrough | £5.5m |
| 16 July 2015 | (Spain) Juanfran | Watford | (Spain) Deportivo la Coruña | Loan |
| 16 July 2015 | (France) Younès Kaboul | Tottenham Hotspur | Sunderland | £3m |
| 16 July 2015 | (England) Lewis McGugan | Watford | Sheffield Wednesday | Undisclosed |
| 16 July 2015 | (Argentina) Santiago Vergini | Sunderland | (Spain) Getafe | Loan |
| 17 July 2015 | (Peru) Cristian Benavente | (Spain) Real Madrid B | Milton Keynes Dons | Free |
| 17 July 2015 | (England) Fabian Delph | Aston Villa | Manchester City | £8m |
| 17 July 2015 | (England) Jordy Hiwula | Manchester City | Huddersfield Town | Undisclosed |
| 17 July 2015 | (Czech Republic) Tomáš Kalas | Chelsea | Middlesbrough | Loan |
| 17 July 2015 | (France) Yaya Sanogo | Arsenal | (Netherlands) Ajax | Loan |
| 18 July 2015 | (France) Jordan Amavi | (France) Nice | Aston Villa | Undisclosed |
| 18 July 2015 | (England) Ben Pearson | Manchester United | Barnsley | Loan |
| 18 July 2015 | (England) Joe Rothwell | Manchester United | Barnsley | Loan |
| 19 July 2015 | (England) Patrick Roberts | Fulham | Manchester City | £12m |
| 20 July 2015 | (Netherlands) Tjaronn Chery | (Netherlands) Groningen | Queens Park Rangers | Undisclosed |
| 20 July 2015 | (England) Jordan Houghton | Chelsea | Gillingham | Loan |
| 20 July 2015 | (France) Jonathan Kodjia | (France) Angers | Bristol City | £2.1m |
| 21 July 2015 | (Spain) Raúl Albentosa | Derby County | (Spain) Málaga | Loan |
| 21 July 2015 | (England) Patrick Bamford | Chelsea | Crystal Palace | Loan |
| 21 July 2015 | (France) Jordan Blaise | (France) Marseille | (Wales) Cardiff City | Free |
| 21 July 2015 | (England) Reece James | Manchester United | Wigan Athletic | Undisclosed |
| 21 July 2015 | (Guinea-Bissau) Francisco Júnior | Everton | Wigan Athletic | Loan |
| 21 July 2015 | (Algeria) Ahmed Kashi | (France) Metz | Charlton Athletic | Undisclosed |
| 21 July 2015 | (England) Jonjoe Kenny | Everton | Wigan Athletic | Loan |
| 21 July 2015 | (France) Bengali-Fodé Koita | Unattached | Blackburn Rovers | Free |
| 21 July 2015 | (Serbia) Aleksandar Mitrović | (Belgium) Anderlecht | Newcastle United | £13m |
| 21 July 2015 | (Nigeria) Kenneth Omeruo | Chelsea | (Turkey) Kasımpaşa | Loan |
| 21 July 2015 | (France) Sacha Petshi | Unattached | Blackburn Rovers | Free |
| 21 July 2015 | (France) Benjamin Stambouli | Tottenham Hotspur | (France) Paris Saint-Germain | £6m |
| 21 July 2015 | (England) Christian Walton | Brighton & Hove Albion | Bury | Loan |
| 22 July 2015 | (Belgium) Christian Benteke | Aston Villa | Liverpool | £32.5m |
| 22 July 2015 | (Uruguay) Miguel Britos | (Italy) Napoli | Watford | Free |
| 22 July 2015 | (England) Martin Cranie | Unattached | Huddersfield Town | Free |
| 22 July 2015 | (Finland) Vahid Hambo | (Finland) Inter Turku | Brighton & Hove Albion | Undisclosed |
| 22 July 2015 | (Spain) José Jurado | (Russia) Spartak Moscow | Watford | Undisclosed |
| 22 July 2015 | (Argentina) Manuel Lanzini | (United Arab Emirates) Al Jazira | West Ham United | Loan |
| 22 July 2015 | (England) Rowan Liburd | Billericay Town | Reading | Free |
| 22 July 2015 | (England) Lyle Della-Verde | Fulham | Fleetwood Town | Free |
| 22 July 2015 | (Brazil) Wallace | Chelsea | (Italy) Carpi | Loan |
| 23 July 2015 | (Morocco) Zakarya Bergdich | (Spain) Real Valladolid | Charlton Athletic | Undisclosed |
| 23 July 2015 | (England) Hiram Boateng | Crystal Palace | Plymouth Argyle | Loan |
| 23 July 2015 | (Spain) Cristian Ceballos | Unattached | Charlton Athletic | Free |
| 23 July 2015 | (Scotland) Jack Harper | (Spain) Real Madrid | Brighton & Hove Albion | Undisclosed |
| 23 July 2015 | (Germany) Philipp Hofmann | (Germany) 1. FC Kaiserslautern | Brentford | Undisclosed |
| 23 July 2015 | (England) Alex McCarthy | Queens Park Rangers | Crystal Palace | Undisclosed |
| 23 July 2015 | (England) Jason Shackell | Burnley | Derby County | Undisclosed |
| 24 July 2015 | (Scotland) Chris Maguire | Unattached | Rotherham United | Free |
| 24 July 2015 | (England) Adedeji Oshilaja | (Wales) Cardiff City | Gillingham | Loan |
| 24 July 2015 | (England) Jordan Thorniley | Everton | Stockport County | Loan |
| 24 July 2015 | (Denmark) Lasse Vibe | (Sweden) Göteborg | Brentford | Undisclosed |
| 25 July 2015 | (England) Luke Garbutt | Everton | Fulham | Loan |
| 25 July 2015 | (England) Ben Hamer | Leicester City | Nottingham Forest | Loan |
| 25 July 2015 | (Republic of Ireland) Conor Sammon | Derby County | Sheffield United | Loan |
| 25 July 2015 | (England) Billy Sharp | Leeds United | Sheffield United | Undisclosed |
| 26 July 2015 | (Democratic Republic of the Congo) Chancel Mbemba | (Belgium) Anderlecht | Newcastle United | Undisclosed |
| 26 July 2015 | (Australia) Ryan Williams | Fulham | Barnsley | Undisclosed |
| 27 July 2015 | (Netherlands) Ibrahim Afellay | Unattached | Stoke City | Free |
| 27 July 2015 | (Ghana) Jordan Ayew | (France) Lorient | Aston Villa | Undisclosed |
| 27 July 2015 | (Netherlands) Steven Berghuis | (Netherlands) AZ | Watford | £4.6m |
| 27 July 2015 | (Australia) Alex Cisak | Burnley | Leyton Orient | Undisclosed |
| 27 July 2015 | (England) Sam Clucas | Chesterfield | Hull City | £1.3m |
| 27 July 2015 | (Republic of Ireland) Greg Cunningham | Bristol City | Preston North End | Undisclosed |
| 27 July 2015 | (Serbia) Marko Dmitrović | Charlton Athletic | (Spain) Alcorcón | Loan |
| 27 July 2015 | (Italy) Diego Fabbrini | Watford | Middlesbrough | Loan |
| 27 July 2015 | (England) Ryan Inniss | Crystal Palace | Port Vale | Loan |
| 27 July 2015 | (England) Michael Jacobs | Wolverhampton Wanderers | Wigan Athletic | Undisclosed |
| 27 July 2015 | (Netherlands) Maikel Kieftenbeld | (Netherlands) Groningen | Birmingham City | Undisclosed |
| 27 July 2015 | (Argentina) Sergio Romero | (Italy) Sampdoria | Manchester United | Free |
| 27 July 2015 | (England) Ryan Taylor | Unattached | Hull City | Free |
| 28 July 2015 | (England) Adam Armstrong | Newcastle United | Coventry City | Loan |
| 28 July 2015 | (Spain) José Ángel Crespo | (Spain) Córdoba | Aston Villa | Undisclosed |
| 28 July 2015 | (England) Robert Hall | Bolton Wanderers | Milton Keynes Dons | Loan |
| 28 July 2015 | (England) Chris Long | Everton | Burnley | Undisclosed |
| 28 July 2015 | (Brazil) Filipe Luís | Chelsea | (Spain) Atlético Madrid | £11.1m |
| 28 July 2015 | (France) Naby Sarr | (Portugal) Sporting CP | Charlton Athletic | Undisclosed |
| 29 July 2015 | (England) Dan Agyei | Wimbledon | Burnley | Undisclosed |
| 29 July 2015 | (Republic of Ireland) Robbie Brady | Hull City | Norwich City | £7m |
| 29 July 2015 | (England) Steven Caulker | Queens Park Rangers | Southampton | Loan |
| 29 July 2015 | (Wales) James Chester | Hull City | West Bromwich Albion | £8m |
| 29 July 2015 | (France) Seko Fofana | Manchester City | (France) Bastia | Loan |
| 29 July 2015 | (England) Sam Gallagher | Southampton | Milton Keynes Dons | Loan |
| 29 July 2015 | (England) Zeli Ismail | Wolverhampton Wanderers | Burton Albion | Loan |
| 29 July 2015 | (Poland) Piotr Parzyszek | Charlton Athletic | (Denmark) Randers | Loan |
| 29 July 2015 | (Poland) Wojciech Szczęsny | Arsenal | (Italy) Roma | Loan |
| 29 July 2015 | (England) Kwame Thomas | Derby County | Blackpool | Loan |
| 29 July 2015 | (England) Andre Wisdom | Liverpool | Norwich City | Loan |
| 29 July 2015 | (England) Freddie Woodman | Newcastle United | Crawley Town | Loan |
| 30 July 2015 | (England) Jerome Binnom-Williams | Crystal Palace | Burton Albion | Loan |
| 30 July 2015 | (Romania) Vlad Chiricheș | Tottenham Hotspur | (Italy) Napoli | £4.5m |
| 30 July 2015 | (England) Tendayi Darikwa | Chesterfield | Burnley | £600,000 |
| 30 July 2015 | (Spain) Daniel Pinillos | Unattached | Nottingham Forest | Free |
| 30 July 2015 | (Spain) Jon Toral | Arsenal | Birmingham City | Loan |
| 30 July 2015 | (England) Matthew Upson | Unattached | Milton Keynes Dons | Free |
| 31 July 2015 | (Spain) Sergio Aguza | (Spain) Real Madrid B | Milton Keynes Dons | Undisclosed |
| 31 July 2015 | (Ghana) Thomas Agyepong | Manchester City | (Netherlands) Twente | Loan |
| 31 July 2015 | (England) Daniel Crowley | Arsenal | Barnsley | Loan |
| 31 July 2015 | (Northern Ireland) Liam Donnelly | Fulham | Crawley Town | Loan |
| 31 July 2015 | (Benin) Rudy Gestede | Blackburn Rovers | Aston Villa | Undisclosed |
| 31 July 2015 | (England) Isaac Hayden | Arsenal | Hull City | Loan |
| 31 July 2015 | (Portugal) Lucas João | (Portugal) Nacional | Sheffield Wednesday | Undisclosed |
| 31 July 2015 | (Montenegro) Stevan Jovetić | Manchester City | (Italy) Inter Milan | Loan |
| 31 July 2015 | (Denmark) Jonas Knudsen | (Denmark) Esbjerg | Ipswich Town | Undisclosed |
| 31 July 2015 | (England) Rickie Lambert | Liverpool | West Bromwich Albion | £3m |
| 31 July 2015 | (France) Olivier Ntcham | Manchester City | (Italy) Genoa | Loan |
| 31 July 2015 | (England) James Perch | Wigan Athletic | Queens Park Rangers | Undisclosed |
| 31 July 2015 | (England) Jordan Pickford | Sunderland | Preston North End | Loan |
| 31 July 2015 | (England) Jack Stephens | Southampton | Middlesbrough | Loan |
| 31 July 2015 | (Turkey) Enes Ünal | Manchester City | (Belgium) Genk | Loan |
| 31 July 2015 | (France) Jordan Veretout | (France) Nantes | Aston Villa | Undisclosed |
| 1 August 2015 | (England) Jake Kean | Unattached | Norwich City | Free |
| 1 August 2015 | (Scotland) Craig Mackail-Smith | Brighton & Hove Albion | Luton Town | Free |
| 3 August 2015 | (Tunisia) Yohan Benalouane | (Italy) Atalanta | Leicester City | Undisclosed |
| 3 August 2015 | (England) Jonny Burn | Middlesbrough | Oldham Athletic | Loan |
| 3 August 2015 | (England) Matthew Clarke | Ipswich Town | Portsmouth | Loan |
| 3 August 2015 | (Mexico) Ulises Dávila | Chelsea | (Portugal) Vitória | Loan |
| 3 August 2015 | (France) N'Golo Kanté | (France) Caen | Leicester City | £5.6m |
| 3 August 2015 | (Guinea) Larsen Touré | Unattached | Ipswich Town | Free |
| 3 August 2015 | (England) Jordan Turnbull | Southampton | Swindon Town | Loan |
| 3 August 2015 | (England) Connor Wickham | Sunderland | Crystal Palace | £7m |
| 3 August 2015 | (England) Bobby Zamora | Unattached | Brighton & Hove Albion | Free |
| 3 August 2015 | (Brazil) Rafael | Manchester United | (France) Lyon | Undisclosed |
| 4 August 2015 | (England) Chuba Akpom | Arsenal | Hull City | Loan |
| 4 August 2015 | (Northern Ireland) Stuart Dallas | Brentford | Leeds United | Undisclosed |
| 4 August 2015 | (Republic of Ireland) Jonathan Douglas | Brentford | Ipswich Town | Free |
| 4 August 2015 | (Ivory Coast) Max Gradel | (France) Saint-Étienne | Bournemouth | Undisclosed |
| 4 August 2015 | (England) Paul Konchesky | Leicester City | Queens Park Rangers | Loan |
| 4 August 2015 | (England) Adam Le Fondre | (Wales) Cardiff City | Wolverhampton Wanderers | Loan |
| 4 August 2015 | (Finland) Sakari Mattila | (Norway) Aalesunds | Fulham | Undisclosed |
| 4 August 2015 | (England) Jeffrey Monakana | Brighton & Hove Albion | Bristol Rovers | Loan |
| 4 August 2015 | (Wales) Steve Morison | Leeds United | Millwall | Undisclosed |
| 4 August 2015 | (England) Sheyi Ojo | Liverpool | Wolverhampton Wanderers | Loan |
| 4 August 2015 | (England) Dominic Solanke | Chelsea | (Netherlands) Vitesse | Loan |
| 4 August 2015 | (England) Lee Tomlin | Middlesbrough | Bournemouth | £3.5m |
| 4 August 2015 | (England) Nick Townsend | Birmingham City | Barnsley | Loan |
| 4 August 2015 | (Colombia) Joao Rodríguez | Chelsea | (Belgium) Sint-Truiden | Loan |
| 4 August 2015 | (Chile) Lawrence Vigouroux | Liverpool | Swindon Town | Loan |
| 5 August 2015 | (France) Aly Cissokho | Aston Villa | (Portugal) Porto | Loan |
| 5 August 2015 | (Scotland) Stephen Dobbie | Unattached | Bolton Wanderers | Free |
| 5 August 2015 | (England) Danny Guthrie | Unattached | Blackburn Rovers | Free |
| 5 August 2015 | (Republic of Ireland) Sean Murray | Watford | Wigan Athletic | Loan |
| 5 August 2015 | (England) Joe Newell | Peterborough United | Rotherham United | Undisclosed |
| 5 August 2015 | (England) Jack Ryan | Preston North End | Morecambe | Loan |
| 5 August 2015 | (Mali) Bakary Sako | Unattached | Crystal Palace | Free |
| 5 August 2015 | (Senegal) Modou Sougou | (France) Olympique Marseille | Sheffield Wednesday | Free |
| 5 August 2015 | (England) Craig Tanner | Reading | Plymouth Argyle | Loan |
| 5 August 2015 | (England) Andrew Taylor | Wigan Athletic | Reading | Loan |
| 5 August 2015 | (Wales) Rhoys Wiggins | Charlton Athletic | Sheffield Wednesday | Undisclosed |
| 5 August 2015 | (England) Lawrie Wilson | Unattached | Bolton Wanderers | Free |
| 6 August 2015 | (England) Jak Alnwick | Newcastle United | Port Vale | Loan |
| 6 August 2015 | (England) Nathan Delfouneso | Unattached | Blackburn Rovers | Free |
| 6 August 2015 | (Argentina) Ángel Di María | Manchester United | (France) Paris Saint-Germain | £44.3m |
| 6 August 2015 | (England) Ryan Fredericks | Tottenham Hotspur | Bristol City | Undisclosed |
| 6 August 2015 | (England) Oscar Gobern | Unattached | Queens Park Rangers | Free |
| 6 August 2015 | (France) Prince-Désir Gouano | (Italy) Atalanta | Bolton Wanderers | Loan |
| 6 August 2015 | (Finland) Niko Hämäläinen | Queens Park Rangers | Dagenham & Redbridge | Loan |
| 6 August 2015 | (England) Luke Hendrie | Unattached | Burnley | Free |
| 6 August 2015 | (England) Todd Kane | Chelsea | (Netherlands) NEC Nijmegen | Loan |
| 6 August 2015 | (England) Bryn Morris | Middlesbrough | Coventry City | Loan |
| 6 August 2015 | (France) Yann M'Vila | (Russia) Rubin Kazan | Sunderland | Loan |
| 6 August 2015 | (Spain) Rafael Páez | Liverpool | (Spain) Alcorcón | Undisclosed |
| 6 August 2015 | (Egypt) Mohamed Salah | Chelsea | (Italy) Roma | Loan |
| 6 August 2015 | (England) Ivan Toney | Northampton Town | Newcastle United | Undisclosed |
| 6 August 2015 | (Belgium) Marnick Vermijl | Sheffield Wednesday | Preston North End | Loan |
| 7 August 2015 | (England) Dominic Calvert-Lewin | Sheffield United | Northampton Town | Loan |
| 7 August 2015 | (England) Harry Cornick | Bournemouth | Yeovil Town | Loan |
| 7 August 2015 | (Croatia) Matej Delač | Chelsea | (Bosnia and Herzegovina) Sarajevo | Loan |
| 7 August 2015 | (Northern Ireland) Shane Ferguson | Newcastle United | Millwall | Loan |
| 7 August 2015 | (Germany) Serge Gnabry | Arsenal | West Bromwich Albion | Loan |
| 7 August 2015 | (England) Grant Hall | Tottenham Hotspur | Queens Park Rangers | Undisclosed |
| 7 August 2015 | (England) Tom Hitchcock | Milton Keynes Dons | Stevenage | Loan |
| 7 August 2015 | (Greece) Kostas Mitroglou | Fulham | (Portugal) Benfica | Loan |
| 7 August 2015 | (England) Moses Odubajo | Brentford | Hull City | £3.5m |
| 7 August 2015 | (England) Callum Robinson | Aston Villa | Bristol City | Loan |
| 7 August 2015 | (Austria) Renny Smith | Unattached | Burnley | Free |
| 7 August 2015 | (Democratic Republic of the Congo) David Tutonda | (Wales) Cardiff City | York City | Loan |
| 7 August 2015 | (Guadeloupe) Stéphane Zubar | Bournemouth | York City | Loan |
| 8 August 2015 | (England) Alex Davey | Chelsea | Peterborough United | Loan |
| 8 August 2015 | (England) Joe Pigott | Charlton Athletic | Southend United | Loan |
| 10 August 2015 | (The Gambia) Modou Barrow | (Wales) Swansea City | Blackburn Rovers | Loan |
| 10 August 2015 | (Chile) Cristián Cuevas | Chelsea | (Belgium) Sint-Truiden | Loan |
| 10 August 2015 | (Canada) David Edgar | Birmingham City | Sheffield United | Loan |
| 10 August 2015 | (England) Josh Ginnelly | Shrewsbury Town | Burnley | Undisclosed |
| 10 August 2015 | (Argentina) Emiliano Martínez | Arsenal | Wolverhampton Wanderers | Loan |
| 10 August 2015 | (Senegal) Dame N'Doye | Hull City | (Turkey) Trabzonspor | £2.2m |
| 10 August 2015 | (Venezuela) Salomón Rondón | (Russia) Zenit Saint Petersburg | West Bromwich Albion | £12m |
| 10 August 2015 | (England) Rory Watson | Hull City | Scunthorpe United | Loan |
| 11 August 2015 | (Nigeria) Hope Akpan | Reading | Blackburn Rovers | Free |
| 11 August 2015 | (England) Ben Hamer | Leicester City | Bristol City | Loan |
| 11 August 2015 | (Switzerland) Xherdan Shaqiri | (Italy) Inter Milan | Stoke City | £12m |
| 12 August 2015 | (Bosnia and Herzegovina) Edin Džeko | Manchester City | (Italy) Roma | Loan |
| 12 August 2015 | (Germany) Uwe Hünemeier | (Germany) Paderborn 07 | Brighton & Hove Albion | Undisclosed |
| 12 August 2015 | (England) Chris Kirkland | Unattached | Preston North End | Free |
| 12 August 2015 | (Spain) Oriol Romeu | Chelsea | Southampton | £5m |
| 12 August 2015 | (England) Josh Vickers | Unattached | (Wales) Swansea City | Free |
| 13 August 2015 | (England) Mason Holgate | Barnsley | Everton | Undisclosed |
| 13 August 2015 | (Peru) Paolo Hurtado | (Portugal) Paços de Ferreira | Reading | Undisclosed |
| 14 August 2015 | (Netherlands) Nathan Aké | Chelsea | Watford | Loan |
| 14 August 2015 | (France) Maxime Colin | (Belgium) Anderlecht | Brentford | Undisclosed |
| 14 August 2015 | (England) Shaq Coulthirst | Tottenham Hotspur | Wigan Athletic | Loan |
| 14 August 2015 | (Germany) Rouwen Hennings | (Germany) Karlsruher SC | Burnley | Undisclosed |
| 14 August 2015 | (Scotland) Chris Kettings | Crystal Palace | Stevenage | Loan |
| 14 August 2015 | (England) Jacob Murphy | Norwich City | Coventry City | Loan |
| 14 August 2015 | (Scotland) Jamie Murphy | Sheffield United | Brighton & Hove Albion | Undisclosed |
| 14 August 2015 | (Cameroon) Clinton N'Jie | (France) Lyon | Tottenham Hotspur | £8.3m |
| 14 August 2015 | (England) Lee Novak | Birmingham City | Chesterfield | Loan |
| 14 August 2015 | (England) David Nugent | Leicester City | Middlesbrough | £4m |
| 14 August 2015 | (England) Connor Ogilvie | Tottenham Hotspur | Stevenage | Loan |
| 14 August 2015 | (Spain) Adama Traoré | (Spain) Barcelona | Aston Villa | £7m |
| 16 August 2015 | (Ghana) Baba Rahman | (Germany) FC Augsburg | Chelsea | £14m |
| 17 August 2015 | (Scotland) Botti Biabi | (Scotland) Falkirk | (Wales) Swansea City | Undisclosed |
| 17 August 2015 | (Italy) Alessandro Diamanti | (China) Guangzhou Evergrande | Watford | Loan |
| 18 August 2015 | (Spain) Álex Fernández | (Spain) Espanyol | Reading | Loan |
| 18 August 2015 | (England) Ayo Obileye | Charlton Athletic | Dagenham & Redbridge | Loan |
| 18 August 2015 | (Brazil) Wellington Silva | Arsenal | Bolton Wanderers | Loan |
| 18 August 2015 | (Spain) Roberto Soldado | Tottenham Hotspur | (Spain) Villarreal | £10m |
| 19 August 2015 | (France) Rémy Cabella | Newcastle United | (France) Marseille | Loan |
| 19 August 2015 | (England) Connor Goldson | Shrewsbury Town | Brighton & Hove Albion | Undisclosed |
| 19 August 2015 | (Switzerland) Gökhan Inler | (Italy) Napoli | Leicester City | £3m |
| 19 August 2015 | (Uruguay) Diego Poyet | West Ham United | Milton Keynes Dons | Loan |
| 19 August 2015 | (France) Florian Thauvin | (France) Marseille | Newcastle United | £12m |
| 20 August 2015 | (England) Reece Burke | West Ham United | Bradford City | Loan |
| 20 August 2015 | (Netherlands) Kyle Ebecilio | (Netherlands) Twente | Nottingham Forest | Loan |
| 20 August 2015 | (Wales) Lee Evans | Wolverhampton Wanderers | Bradford City | Loan |
| 20 August 2015 | (Argentina) Nicolás Otamendi | (Spain) Valencia | Manchester City | £32m |
| 20 August 2015 | (Spain) Pedro | (Spain) Barcelona | Chelsea | £21.4m |
| 20 August 2015 | (Italy) Francesco Pisano | Unattached | Bolton Wanderers | Free |
| 20 August 2015 | (United States) Tim Ream | Bolton Wanderers | Fulham | Undisclosed |
| 20 August 2015 | (England) Christian Scales | Crystal Palace | Crawley Town | Loan |
| 20 August 2015 | (England) Alex Smithies | Huddersfield Town | Queens Park Rangers | Undisclosed |
| 20 August 2015 | (England) Ryan Watson | Leicester City | Northampton Town | Loan |
| 21 August 2015 | (Algeria) Mehdi Abeid | Newcastle United | (Greece) Panathinaikos | Undisclosed |
| 21 August 2015 | (England) Jacob Blyth | Leicester City | Cambridge United | Loan |
| 21 August 2015 | (Denmark) Nicolai Brock-Madsen | (Denmark) Randers | Birmingham City | £500,000 |
| 21 August 2015 | (Saint Lucia) Janoi Donacien | Aston Villa | Wycombe Wanderers | Loan |
| 21 August 2015 | (England) Andre Gray | Brentford | Burnley | £9m |
| 21 August 2015 | (Wales) Tom Lawrence | Leicester City | Blackburn Rovers | Loan |
| 21 August 2015 | (England) Josh Murphy | Norwich City | Milton Keynes Dons | Loan |
| 22 August 2015 | (England) Kadeem Harris | (Wales) Cardiff City | Barnsley | Loan |
| 22 August 2015 | (England) Luke O'Neill | Burnley | Southend United | Loan |
| 22 August 2015 | (Brazil) Kenedy | (Brazil) Fluminense | Chelsea | £6.3m |
| 24 August 2015 | (England) James Alabi | Unattached | Ipswich Town | Free |
| 24 August 2015 | (England) Joe Lewis | (Wales) Cardiff City | Fulham | Loan |
| 24 August 2015 | (England) Liam O'Neil | West Bromwich Albion | Chesterfield | Undisclosed |
| 25 August 2015 | (Colombia) Juan Cuadrado | Chelsea | (Italy) Juventus | Loan |
| 25 August 2015 | (Germany) Marko Marin | Chelsea | (Turkey) Trabzonspor | Loan |
| 25 August 2015 | (Scotland) Murray Wallace | Huddersfield Town | Scunthorpe United | Loan |
| 26 August 2015 | (Scotland) Stephen Kingsley | (Wales) Swansea City | Crewe Alexandra | Loan |
| 26 August 2015 | (Romania) Gabriel Tamaș | Unattached | (Wales) Cardiff City | Free |
| 26 August 2015 | (Wales) Harry Wilson | Liverpool | Crewe Alexandra | Loan |
| 27 August 2015 | (Italy) Mario Balotelli | Liverpool | (Italy) A.C. Milan | Loan |
| 27 August 2015 | (England) Joey Barton | Unattached | Burnley | Free |
| 27 August 2015 | (The Gambia) Mustapha Carayol | Middlesbrough | Huddersfield Town | Loan |
| 27 August 2015 | (Spain) José Manuel Casado | Unattached | Bolton Wanderers | Free |
| 27 August 2015 | (England) Jordy Hiwula | Huddersfield Town | Wigan Athletic | Loan |
| 27 August 2015 | (Wales) Emyr Huws | Wigan Athletic | Huddersfield Town | Loan |
| 27 August 2015 | (Finland) Jesse Joronen | Fulham | Stevenage | Loan |
| 27 August 2015 | (Scotland) Shaun Maloney | (United States) Chicago Fire | Hull City | Undisclosed |
| 27 August 2015 | (Russia) Pavel Pogrebnyak | Reading | (Russia) Dynamo Moscow | Free |
| 27 August 2015 | (England) Oscar Threlkeld | Bolton Wanderers | Plymouth Argyle | Loan |
| 27 August 2015 | (Bulgaria) Aleksandar Tonev | Aston Villa | (Italy) Frosinone | Undisclosed |
| 27 August 2015 | (England) Michael Turner | Norwich City | Sheffield Wednesday | Loan |
| 28 August 2015 | (Venezuela) Fernando Amorebieta | Fulham | Middlesbrough | Loan |
| 28 August 2015 | (England) Callum Harriott | Charlton Athletic | Colchester United | Loan |
| 28 August 2015 | (England) James Husband | Middlesbrough | Fulham | Loan |
| 30 June 2015 | (Portugal) Marcos Lopes | Manchester City | (France) Monaco | £3.9m |
| 28 August 2015 | (England) Joe Maguire | Liverpool | Leyton Orient | Loan |
| 28 August 2015 | (Poland) Piotr Malarczyk | (Poland) Korona Kielce | Ipswich Town | Undisclosed |
| 28 August 2015 | (England) Jak McCourt | Leicester City | Port Vale | Loan |
| 28 August 2015 | (Republic of Ireland) Stephen McLaughlin | Nottingham Forest | Southend United | Undisclosed |
| 28 August 2015 | (Uruguay) Leandro Rodríguez | (Uruguay) River Plate | Everton | £500,000 |
| 28 August 2015 | (South Korea) Son Heung-min | (Germany) Bayer Leverkusen | Tottenham Hotspur | £22m |
| 28 August 2015 | (Lithuania) Simonas Stankevičius | Leicester City | Oldham Athletic | Loan |
| 28 August 2015 | (England) Cameron Stewart | Ipswich Town | Doncaster Rovers | Loan |
| 28 August 2015 | (Sweden) Ola Toivonen | (France) Rennes | Sunderland | Loan |
| 28 August 2015 | (Hungary) Dániel Tőzsér | Unattached | Queens Park Rangers | Free |
| 29 August 2015 | (England) Tyler Blackett | Manchester United | (Scotland) Celtic | Loan |
| 29 August 2015 | (Australia) Callum Elder | Leicester City | Peterborough United | Loan |
| 29 August 2015 | (Northern Ireland) Jonny Evans | Manchester United | West Bromwich Albion | Undisclosed |
| 29 August 2015 | (Italy) Fernando Forestieri | Watford | Sheffield Wednesday | Undisclosed |
| 29 August 2015 | (Netherlands) Elvis Manu | (Netherlands) Feyenoord | Brighton & Hove Albion | Undisclosed |
| 29 August 2015 | (Northern Ireland) Ryan McLaughlin | Liverpool | (Scotland) Aberdeen | Loan |
| 29 August 2015 | (Australia) Tommy Oar | Unattached | Ipswich Town | Free |
| 29 August 2015 | (Czech Republic) Daniel Pudil | Watford | Sheffield Wednesday | Loan |
| 29 August 2015 | (Republic of Ireland) Glen Rea | Brighton & Hove Albion | Southend United | Loan |
| 30 August 2015 | (Belgium) Kevin De Bruyne | (Germany) VfL Wolfsburg | Manchester City | £55m |
| 30 August 2015 | (Serbia) Lazar Marković | Liverpool | (Turkey) Fenerbahçe | Loan |
| 31 August 2015 | (Scotland) Barry Bannan | Crystal Palace | Sheffield Wednesday | Undisclosed |
| 31 August 2015 | (France) Jeremie Boga | Chelsea | (France) Rennes | Loan |
| 31 August 2015 | (Italy) Fabio Borini | Liverpool | Sunderland | £10m |
| 31 August 2015 | (England) Riccardo Calder | Aston Villa | (Scotland) Dundee | Loan |
| 31 August 2015 | (Spain) Sergi Canós | Liverpool | Brentford | Loan |
| 31 August 2015 | (Belgium) Jason Denayer | Manchester City | (Turkey) Galatasaray | Loan |
| 31 August 2015 | (Austria) Marco Djuricin | (Austria) Red Bull Salzburg | Brentford | Loan |
| 31 August 2015 | (Georgia (country)) Lasha Dvali | Reading | (Germany) MSV Duisburg | Free |
| 31 August 2015 | (England) Ryan Fredericks | Bristol City | Fulham | Undisclosed |
| 31 August 2015 | (Italy) Emanuele Giaccherini | Sunderland | (Italy) Bologna | Loan |
| 31 August 2015 | (Spain) Javi Guerra | (Wales) Cardiff City | (Spain) Rayo Vallecano | Undisclosed |
| 31 August 2015 | (Mexico) Javier Hernández | Manchester United | (Germany) Bayer Leverkusen | £7.3m |
| 31 August 2015 | (Nigeria) Brown Ideye | West Bromwich Albion | (Greece) Olympiacos | Undisclosed |
| 31 August 2015 | (Belgium) Adnan Januzaj | Manchester United | (Germany) Borussia Dortmund | Loan |
| 31 August 2015 | (France) Olivier Kemen | Newcastle United | (France) Lyon | £550,000 |
| 31 August 2015 | (Denmark) Anders Lindegaard | Manchester United | West Bromwich Albion | Free |
| 31 August 2015 | (Mali) Modibo Maïga | West Ham United | (Saudi Arabia) Al-Nassr | Undisclosed |
| 31 August 2015 | (Zambia) Emmanuel Mayuka | Southampton | (France) Metz | Undisclosed |
| 31 August 2015 | (Democratic Republic of the Congo) Dieumerci Mbokani | (Ukraine) Dynamo Kyiv | Norwich City | Loan |
| 31 August 2015 | (England) Glenn Murray | Crystal Palace | Bournemouth | £5m |
| 31 August 2015 | (France) Loïc Nego | Charlton Athletic | (Hungary) Videoton | Undisclosed |
| 31 August 2015 | (Brazil) Lucas Piazon | Chelsea | Reading | Loan |
| 31 August 2015 | (France) Idriss Saadi | (France) Clermont Foot | (Wales) Cardiff City | Undisclosed |
| 31 August 2015 | (Netherlands) Ricky van Wolfswinkel | Norwich City | (Spain) Real Betis | Loan |
| 31 August 2015 | (Slovenia) Etien Velikonja | (Wales) Cardiff City | (Belgium) Lierse | Undisclosed |
| 31 August 2015 | (Belgium) Jelle Vossen | Burnley | (Belgium) Club Brugge | Undisclosed |
| 31 August 2015 | (Germany) Samed Yeşil | Liverpool | (Switzerland) Luzern | Loan |
| 31 August 2015 | (Romania) Cristian Manea | Chelsea | (Belgium) Royal Excel Mouscron | Loan |
| 1 September 2015 | (Italy) Gabriele Angella | Watford | Queens Park Rangers | Loan |
| 1 September 2015 | (England) Nathan Baker | Aston Villa | Bristol City | Loan |
| 1 September 2015 | (Democratic Republic of the Congo) Jordan Botaka | (Netherlands) Excelsior | Leeds United | Undisclosed |
| 1 September 2015 | (England) Jacob Butterfield | Huddersfield Town | Derby County | Undisclosed |
| 1 September 2015 | (England) Nathan Byrne | Swindon Town | Wolverhampton Wanderers | Undisclosed |
| 1 September 2015 | (Norway) Adama Diomande | (Norway) Stabæk | Hull City | Undisclosed |
| 1 September 2015 | (Senegal) Papy Djilobodji | (France) Nantes | Chelsea | £2.7m |
| 1 September 2015 | (Argentina) Ramiro Funes Mori | (Argentina) River Plate | Everton | £9.5m |
| 1 September 2015 | (Croatia) Nikica Jelavić | Hull City | West Ham United | £3m |
| 1 September 2015 | (Mexico) Miguel Layún | Watford | (Portugal) Porto | Loan |
| 1 September 2015 | (England) Joleon Lescott | West Bromwich Albion | Aston Villa | £2m |
| 1 September 2015 | (England) Liam Moore | Leicester City | Bristol City | Loan |
| 1 September 2015 | (Nigeria) Victor Moses | Chelsea | West Ham United | Loan |
| 1 September 2015 | (England) Luke O'Neill | Burnley | Southend United | Free |
| 1 September 2015 | (Belgium) Obbi Oularé | (Belgium) Club Brugge | Watford | Undisclosed |
| 1 September 2015 | (Montenegro) Matija Sarkic | (Belgium) Anderlecht | Aston Villa | Undisclosed |
| 1 September 2015 | (Cameroon) Alex Song | (Spain) Barcelona | West Ham United | Loan |
| 1 September 2015 | (England) Richard Stearman | Wolverhampton Wanderers | Fulham | Undisclosed |
| 1 September 2015 | (Netherlands) Virgil van Dijk | (Scotland) Celtic | Southampton | £11.5m |
| 1 September 2015 | (Scotland) Islam Feruz | Chelsea | (Scotland) Hibernian | Loan |
| 1 September 2015 | (France) Anthony Martial | (France) Monaco | Manchester United | £36m |
| 1 September 2015 | (Jamaica) Michael Hector | Reading | Chelsea | £5.4m |
| 1 September 2015 | (Jamaica) Michael Hector | Chelsea | Reading | Loan |
| 1 September 2015 | (Uruguay) Carlos de Pena | (Uruguay) Nacional | Middlesbrough | Undisclosed |
| 1 September 2015 | (Netherlands) Ola John | (Portugal) Benfica | Reading | Loan |
| 1 September 2015 | (Czech Republic) Matěj Vydra | Watford | Reading | Loan |

^{a} Player officially joined his club on 1 July 2015.
