= 2015–16 Preston North End F.C. season =

English football club season

Preston North End
2015–16 season
- Manager: Simon Grayson
- Stadium: Deepdale
- Championship: 11th
- FA Cup: Third Round (eliminated by Peterborough United)
- League Cup: Third round (eliminated by Bournemouth)
- Lancashire Senior Cup: First round (eliminated by Everton)
- Top goalscorer: League: Daniel Johnson (7); All: Daniel Johnson (7)
- Highest home attendance: 19,852 (vs Blackburn Rovers, 21 Nov 15)
- Lowest home attendance: 5,643 (vs Bournemouth (League Cup, 22 Sep 15)
- Average home league attendance: 13,035
| Home colours | Away colours |

The 2015–16 season was Preston North End's first season back in the Championship, after gaining promotion via the play-offs last season, in their 136th year in existence. Along with competing in the Championship, the club will also participate in the FA Cup and League Cup. The season covers the period from 1 July 2015 to 30 June 2016.

== Kit ==
Supplier: Nike
Sponsor(s): Virgin Trains

| Home | Away |

Last updated: 29 July 2015.
Source: Historical Football Kits

== Squad ==
| No. | Name | Pos. | Nationality | Place of birth | Age | Apps | Goals | Signed from | Date signed | Fee | End |
Goalkeepers
| 1 | Anders Lindegaard | GK | (Denmark) | Dyrup | 42 | 9 | 0 | West Bromwich Albion | 23 January 2016 | Loan | 2016 |
| 26 | Steven James | GK | (England) | Stockport | 31 | 0 | 0 | Academy | 1 July 2013 | Free | 2016 |
| 40 | Matthew Hudson | GK | (England) | | | 1 | 0 | Academy | 1 July 2015 | Free | 2016 |
| 43 | Chris Kirkland | GK | (England) | Barwell | 45 | 2 | 0 | Sheffield Wednesday | 12 August 2015 | Free | 2016 |
Defenders
| 2 | Marnick Vermijl | RB | (Belgium) | Peer | 34 | 28 | 3 | Sheffield Wednesday | 7 August 2015 | Loan | 2016 |
| 3 | Greg Cunningham | LB | (Republic of Ireland) | Galway | 35 | 38 | 1 | Bristol City | 27 July 2015 | Undisclosed | 2017 |
| 5 | Tom Clarke | CB | (England) | Sowerby Bridge | 38 | 140 | 7 | Huddersfield Town | 22 May 2013 | Free | 2017 |
| 6 | Bailey Wright | CB | (Australia) | Melbourne | 34 | 178 | 8 | Academy | 1 July 2009 | Trainee | 2017 |
| 15 | Calum Woods | FB | (England) | Liverpool | 39 | 56 | 0 | Huddersfield Town | 1 July 2014 | Free | 2018 |
| 23 | Paul Huntington | CB | (England) | Carlisle | 39 | 156 | 15 | Yeovil Town | 22 May 2012 | Free | 2017 |
| 28 | Nick Anderton | LB | (England) | | 30 | 0 | 0 | Academy | 1 July 2014 | Free | 2016 |
| 29 | Josh Heaton | CB | (England) | | 30 | 0 | 0 | Academy | 1 July 2015 | Trainee | 2016 |
Midfielders
| 4 | Ben Pearson | CM | (England) | Oldham | 31 | 11 | 0 | Manchester United | 11 January 2016 | £100,000 | 2018 |
| 7 | Chris Humphrey | WG | (Jamaica) | Saint Catherine | 38 | 116 | 7 | Motherwell | 4 June 2013 | Free | 2017 |
| 8 | Neil Kilkenny | CM | (Australia) (England) | Enfield | 40 | 92 | 4 | Bristol City | 14 November 2013 | Free | 2016 |
| 11 | Daniel Johnson | AM | (Jamaica) | Kingston | 34 | 62 | 16 | Aston Villa | 23 January 2015 | £50,000 | 2017 |
| 12 | Paul Gallagher | AM/WG | (England) | Glasgow | 42 | 141 | 30 | Leicester City | 16 June 2015 | Free | 2017 |
| 16 | Alan Browne | CM | (Republic of Ireland) | Cork | 31 | 73 | 6 | Free agent | 1 January 2014 | Free | 2018 |
| 19 | John Welsh | CM | (England) | Liverpool | 41 | 152 | 3 | Tranmere Rovers | 14 May 2012 | Free | 2017 |
| 31 | Liam Grimshaw | MF/RB | (England) | Burnley | 31 | 0 | 0 | Manchester United | 18 January 2016 | Undisclosed | 2018 |
| 32 | Adam Reach | LW | (England) | Chester-le-Street | 33 | 27 | 5 | Middlesbrough | 26 September 2015 | Loan | 2016 |
Forwards
| 10 | Jermaine Beckford | CF | (England) | London | 42 | 35 | 18 | Bolton Wanderers | 9 June 2015 | Free | 2017 |
| 13 | Eoin Doyle | CF | (Republic of Ireland) | Dublin | 38 | 24 | 2 | Cardiff City | 1 September 2015 | Loan | 2016 |
| 14 | Joe Garner | CF | (England) | Blackburn | 38 | 138 | 52 | Watford | 8 January 2013 | Free | 2018 |
| 18 | Andy Little | CF | (Northern Ireland) | Enniskillen | 37 | 16 | 2 | Rangers | 21 June 2014 | Free | 2016 |
| 24 | Stevie May | CF | (Scotland) | Perth | 34 | 8 | 0 | Sheffield Wednesday | 1 September 2015 | Undisclosed | 2018 |
| 25 | Jordan Hugill | CF | (England) | Middlesbrough | 34 | 32 | 5 | Port Vale | 19 June 2014 | Undisclosed | 2016 |
| 37 | Callum Robinson | CF | (England) | Northampton | 31 | 38 | 8 | Aston Villa | 5 January 2016 | Loan | 2016 |
Out on Loan
| 17 | Kyel Reid | WG | (England) | Deptford | 38 | 29 | 0 | Bradford City | 1 July 2014 | Free | 2016 |
| 20 | Ben Davies | LB | (England) | Barrow-in-Furness | 31 | 10 | 0 | Academy | 25 January 2013 | Free | 2016 |
| 22 | Josh Brownhill | CM | (England) | Warrington | 30 | 61 | 8 | Academy | 1 July 2013 | Trainee | 2016 |
| 27 | Jack Ryan | CF | (England) | Barrow-in-Furness | 31 | 2 | 0 | Academy | 1 July 2014 | Trainee | 2016 |

=== Statistics ===
As of 10 April 2016

| No. | Pos | Nat | Player | Total | | Championship | | FA Cup | | League Cup | |
| No. | Pos | Nat | Player | Apps | Goals | Apps | Goals | Apps | Goals | Apps | Goals |
|---|---|---|---|---|---|---|---|---|---|---|---|
| 1 | GK | (Denmark) DEN | Anders Lindegaard (on loan from West Bromwich Albion) | 10 | 0 | 10+0 | 0 | 0+0 | 0 | 0+0 | 0 |
| 2 | DF | (Belgium) BEL | Marnick Vermijl (on loan from Sheffield Wednesday) | 29 | 3 | 17+8 | 2 | 1+0 | 0 | 2+1 | 1 |
| 3 | DF | (Republic of Ireland) IRL | Greg Cunningham | 40 | 1 | 37+0 | 1 | 1+0 | 0 | 2+0 | 0 |
| 4 | MF | (England) ENG | Ben Pearson | 11 | 0 | 9+2 | 0 | 0+0 | 0 | 0+0 | 0 |
| 5 | DF | (England) ENG | Tom Clarke | 34 | 0 | 30+1 | 0 | 1+0 | 0 | 2+0 | 0 |
| 6 | DF | (Australia) AUS | Bailey Wright | 34 | 0 | 31+0 | 0 | 0+0 | 0 | 3+0 | 0 |
| 7 | MF | (Jamaica) JAM | Chris Humphrey | 13 | 0 | 5+5 | 0 | 0+0 | 0 | 1+2 | 0 |
| 8 | MF | (Australia) AUS | Neil Kilkenny | 14 | 1 | 5+7 | 1 | 0+0 | 0 | 2+0 | 0 |
| 10 | FW | (Jamaica) JAM | Jermaine Beckford | 4 | 0 | 0+3 | 0 | 0+0 | 0 | 0+1 | 0 |
| 11 | MF | (Jamaica) JAM | Daniel Johnson | 40 | 8 | 38+1 | 7 | 0+0 | 0 | 1+0 | 1 |
| 12 | MF | (Scotland) SCO | Paul Gallagher | 36 | 5 | 35+0 | 5 | 0+1 | 0 | 0+0 | 0 |
| 13 | FW | (Republic of Ireland) IRL | Eoin Doyle (on loan from Cardiff City) | 26 | 3 | 14+11 | 3 | 1+0 | 0 | 0+0 | 0 |
| 14 | FW | (England) ENG | Joe Garner | 39 | 6 | 35+1 | 6 | 1+0 | 0 | 1+1 | 0 |
| 15 | DF | (England) ENG | Calum Woods | 31 | 0 | 24+4 | 0 | 0+0 | 0 | 3+0 | 0 |
| 16 | MF | (Republic of Ireland) IRL | Alan Browne | 35 | 2 | 22+9 | 2 | 1+0 | 0 | 3+0 | 0 |
| 19 | MF | (England) ENG | John Welsh | 25 | 0 | 13+10 | 0 | 1+0 | 0 | 1+0 | 0 |
| 23 | DF | (England) ENG | Paul Huntington | 37 | 0 | 28+6 | 0 | 1+0 | 0 | 2+0 | 0 |
| 24 | FW | (England) ENG | Stevie May | 8 | 0 | 4+3 | 0 | 0+0 | 0 | 1+0 | 0 |
| 25 | FW | (England) ENG | Jordan Hugill | 27 | 4 | 6+18 | 2 | 0+1 | 0 | 2+0 | 2 |
| 32 | MF | (England) ENG | Adam Reach (on loan from Middlesbrough) | 31 | 4 | 30+0 | 4 | 1+0 | 0 | 0+0 | 0 |
| 37 | FW | (England) ENG | Callum Robinson (on loan from Aston Villa) | 9 | 2 | 3+6 | 2 | 0+0 | 0 | 0+0 | 0 |
| 40 | GK | (England) ENG | Matthew Hudson | 1 | 0 | 0+1 | 0 | 0+0 | 0 | 0+0 | 0 |
| 43 | GK | (England) ENG | Chris Kirkland | 2 | 0 | 1+0 | 0 | 1+0 | 0 | 0+0 | 0 |
First Team Players on loan:
| 17 | MF | (England) ENG | Kyel Reid (at Bradford City) | 3 | 0 | 0+1 | 0 | 0+0 | 0 | 1+1 | 0 |
| 20 | DF | (England) ENG | Ben Davies (at Newport County) | 1 | 0 | 0+0 | 0 | 0+0 | 0 | 0+1 | 0 |
| 22 | MF | (England) ENG | Josh Brownhill (at Barnsley) | 5 | 1 | 0+2 | 0 | 1+0 | 0 | 2+0 | 1 |
Players that left the club during the season:
| 1 | GK | (England) ENG | Sam Johnstone (on loan from Manchester United) | 4 | 0 | 4+0 | 0 | 0+0 | 0 | 0+0 | 0 |
| 1 | GK | (England) ENG | Jordan Pickford (on loan from Sunderland) | 27 | 0 | 24+0 | 0 | 0+0 | 0 | 3+0 | 0 |
| 9 | FW | (England) ENG | Will Keane (on loan from Manchester United) | 22 | 2 | 12+8 | 1 | 0+0 | 0 | 2+0 | 1 |
| 4 | DF | (Republic of Ireland) IRL | Paddy McCarthy (on loan from Crystal Palace) | 1 | 0 | 1+0 | 0 | 0+0 | 0 | 0+0 | 0 |

==== Goals record ====
As of 10 April 2016

| Rank | No. | Po. | Name | Championship | FA Cup | League Cup | Total |
|---|---|---|---|---|---|---|---|
| 1 | 11 | MF | (Jamaica) Daniel Johnson | 7 | 0 | 1 | 8 |
| 2 | 14 | FW | (England) Joe Garner | 6 | 0 | 0 | 6 |
| 3 | 12 | MF | (Scotland) Paul Gallagher | 5 | 0 | 0 | 5 |
| 3 | 32 | MF | (England) Adam Reach | 4 | 0 | 0 | 4 |
| 5 | 25 | FW | (England) Jordan Hugill | 2 | 0 | 2 | 4 |
| 6 | 2 | DF | (Belgium) Marnick Vermijl | 2 | 0 | 1 | 3 |
| 6 | 13 | FW | (Republic of Ireland) Eoin Doyle | 3 | 0 | 0 | 3 |
| 8 | 9 | FW | (England) Will Keane | 1 | 0 | 1 | 2 |
| 8 | 16 | MF | (Republic of Ireland) Alan Browne | 2 | 0 | 0 | 2 |
| 8 | 37 | FW | (England) Callum Robinson | 2 | 0 | 0 | 2 |
| 11 | 3 | DF | (Republic of Ireland) Greg Cunningham | 1 | 0 | 0 | 1 |
| 11 | 8 | MF | (Australia) Neil Kilkenny | 1 | 0 | 0 | 1 |
| 11 | 22 | MF | (England) Josh Brownhill | 0 | 0 | 1 | 1 |
| Own Goal | | | | 3 | 0 | 0 | 3 |
| Total | | | | 43 | 0 | 6 | 49 |

==== Disciplinary record ====
As of 10 April 2016

| No. | Po. | Name | Championship | | FA Cup | | League Cup | | Total | |
| No. | Po. | Name | Yellow card | Red card | Yellow card | Red card | Yellow card | Red card | Yellow card | Red card |
|---|---|---|---|---|---|---|---|---|---|---|
| 1 | GK | (England) Jordan Pickford | 2 | 1 | 0 | 0 | 0 | 0 | 2 | 1 |
| 2 | DF | (Belgium) Marnick Vermijl | 3 | 0 | 0 | 0 | 0 | 0 | 3 | 0 |
| 3 | DF | (Republic of Ireland) Greg Cunningham | 10 | 0 | 0 | 0 | 0 | 0 | 10 | 0 |
| 4 | MF | (England) Ben Pearson | 2 | 0 | 0 | 0 | 0 | 0 | 2 | 0 |
| 5 | DF | (England) Tom Clarke | 4 | 0 | 1 | 0 | 0 | 0 | 5 | 0 |
| 6 | DF | (Australia) Bailey Wright | 10 | 2 | 0 | 0 | 0 | 0 | 10 | 2 |
| 7 | MF | (Jamaica) Chris Humphrey | 1 | 0 | 0 | 0 | 0 | 0 | 1 | 0 |
| 8 | MF | (Australia) Neil Kilkenny | 1 | 0 | 0 | 0 | 0 | 0 | 1 | 0 |
| 9 | FW | (England) Will Keane | 2 | 0 | 0 | 0 | 1 | 0 | 3 | 0 |
| 10 | FW | (Jamaica) Jermaine Beckford | 3 | 0 | 0 | 0 | 0 | 0 | 3 | 0 |
| 11 | MF | (Jamaica) Daniel Johnson | 4 | 0 | 0 | 0 | 0 | 0 | 4 | 0 |
| 12 | MF | (Scotland) Paul Gallagher | 10 | 0 | 0 | 0 | 0 | 0 | 10 | 0 |
| 14 | FW | (England) Joe Garner | 11 | 1 | 0 | 0 | 0 | 0 | 11 | 1 |
| 15 | DF | (England) Calum Woods | 6 | 0 | 0 | 0 | 1 | 0 | 7 | 0 |
| 16 | MF | (Republic of Ireland) Alan Browne | 2 | 0 | 0 | 0 | 1 | 0 | 3 | 0 |
| 17 | MF | (England) Kyel Reid | 0 | 0 | 0 | 0 | 1 | 0 | 1 | 0 |
| 19 | MF | (England) John Welsh | 5 | 0 | 0 | 0 | 0 | 0 | 5 | 0 |
| 23 | DF | (England) Paul Huntington | 9 | 0 | 0 | 0 | 0 | 0 | 9 | 0 |
| 25 | FW | (England) Jordan Hugill | 1 | 1 | 0 | 0 | 0 | 0 | 1 | 1 |
| 32 | MF | (England) Adam Reach | 1 | 0 | 1 | 0 | 0 | 0 | 2 | 0 |
| Total | | | 87 | 5 | 2 | 0 | 4 | 0 | 93 | 5 |

=== Contracts ===
| No. | Pos. | Nat. | Name | Age | Status | Contract length | Expiry date | Source |
|---|---|---|---|---|---|---|---|---|
| 28 | DF | (England) | Nick Anderton | 19 | Extended | 1 year | June 2016 | Preston North End Official Site |
| 5 | DF | (England) | Tom Clarke | 27 | Signed | 2 years | June 2017 | Preston North End Official Site |
| 23 | DF | (England) | Paul Huntington | 27 | Signed | 2 years | June 2017 | Preston North End Official Site |
| 27 | FW | (England) | Jack Ryan | 20 | Extended | 1 year | June 2016 | Preston North End Official Site |
| 6 | DF | (Australia) | Bailey Wright | 22 | Extended | 2 years | June 2017 | Preston North End Official Site |
| 7 | MF | (Jamaica) | Chris Humphrey | 27 | Signed | 2 years | June 2017 | BBC Sport |
| 19 | MF | (England) | John Welsh | 31 | Signed | 2 years | June 2017 | BBC Sport |
| 3 | DF | (England) | Scott Laird | 27 | Rejected | —N/a | June 2015 | BBC Sport |
| 21 | GK | (Germany) | Thorsten Stuckmann | 34 | Rejected | —N/a | June 2015 | BBC Sport |
| 14 | FW | (England) | Joe Garner | 27 | Signed | 3 years | June 2018 | BBC Sport |
| 16 | MF | (Republic of Ireland) | Alan Browne | 20 | Signed | 3 years | June 2018 | BBC Sport |
| 26 | GK | (England) | Steven James | 20 | Signed | 1 year | June 2016 | Preston North End Official Site |
| 15 | DF | (England) | Calum Woods | 28 | Signed | 3 years | June 2018 | BBC Sport |

== Transfers ==
=== Transfers in ===
| Date from | Position | Nationality | Name | From | Fee | Ref. |
|---|---|---|---|---|---|---|
| 1 July 2015 | CF | JAM | Jermaine Beckford | Bolton Wanderers | Free transfer | |
| 1 July 2015 | AM | SCO | Paul Gallagher | Leicester City | Free transfer | |
| 27 July 2015 | LB | IRL | Greg Cunningham | Bristol City | Undisclosed | |
| 12 August 2015 | GK | ENG | Chris Kirkland | Sheffield Wednesday | Free transfer | |
| 1 September 2015 | CF | SCO | Stevie May | Sheffield Wednesday | Undisclosed | |
| 11 January 2016 | CM | ENG | Ben Pearson | Manchester United | £100,000 | (Note: Although officially undisclosed, Manchester Evening News reported the fee to be £100,000.) |
| 18 January 2016 | MF | ENG | Liam Grimshaw | Manchester United | Undisclosed | |

=== Transfers out ===
| Date from | Position | Nationality | Name | To | Fee | Ref. |
|---|---|---|---|---|---|---|
| 1 July 2015 | LB | NIR | David Buchanan | Northampton Town (Note: Following Buchanan's release on 28 May 2015, he later signed for Northampton Town.) | Free transfer | |
| 1 July 2015 | CF | ENG | Kevin Davies | Free agent | Released | |
| 1 July 2015 | CF | ENG | Sylvan Ebanks-Blake | Chesterfield (Note: Following Ebanks-Blake release on 28 May 2015, he later signed for Chesterfield.) | Free transfer | |
| 1 July 2015 | LW | ENG | Lee Holmes | Exeter City (Note: Following Holmes' release on 28 May 2015, he later signed for Exeter City.) | Free transfer | |
| 1 July 2015 | DM | IRL | Keith Keane | Cambridge United (Note: Following Keane's release on 28 May 2015, he later signed for Cambridge United.) | Free transfer | |
| 1 July 2015 | AM | ENG | Jack King | Scunthorpe United (Note: Following King's release on 28 May 2015, he later signed for Scunthorpe United.) | Free transfer | |
| 1 July 2015 | LB | ENG | Scott Laird | Scunthorpe United | Free transfer | |
| 1 July 2015 | GK | GER | Thorsten Stuckmann | Doncaster Rovers | Free transfer | |
| 1 July 2015 | RB | GIB | Scott Wiseman | Scunthorpe United (Note: Following Wiseman's release on 28 May 2015, he later signed for Scunthorpe United.) | Free transfer | |
| 29 January 2016 | GK | ENG | Jamie Jones | Stevenage | Free transfer | |

=== Loans in ===
| Date from | Position | Nationality | Name | From | Date until | Ref. |
|---|---|---|---|---|---|---|
| 8 July 2015 | CF | ENG | Will Keane | Manchester United | End of season | |
| 31 July 2015 | GK | ENG | Jordan Pickford | Sunderland | 31 December 2015 | |
| 6 August 2015 | RB | BEL | Marnick Vermijl | Sheffield Wednesday | End of season | |
| 1 September 2015 | CF | IRL | Eoin Doyle | Cardiff City | End of season | |
| 26 September 2015 | LM | ENG | Adam Reach | Middlesbrough | End of Season | |
| 3 October 2015 | DF | IRL | Paddy McCarthy | Crystal Palace | 4 January 2016 | |
| 31 December 2015 | GK | ENG | Sam Johnstone | Manchester United | 23 January 2016 | |
| 5 January 2016 | CF | ENG | Callum Robinson | Aston Villa | End of Season | |
| 23 January 2016 | GK | DEN | Anders Lindegaard | West Bromwich Albion | End of Season | |

=== Loans out ===
| Date from | Position | Nationality | Name | To | Date until | Ref. |
|---|---|---|---|---|---|---|
| 5 August 2015 | CF | ENG | Jack Ryan | Morecambe | 23 October 2015 | |
| 10 August 2015 | LB | ENG | Nick Anderton | Aldershot Town | 7 September 2015 | |
| 11 September 2015 | DF | ENG | Ben Davies | Southport | 20 October 2015 | |
| 11 September 2015 | GK | ENG | Jamie Jones | Colchester United | 11 December 2015 | |
| 2 October 2015 | WG | ENG | Kyel Reid | Bradford City | 2 January 2016 | |
| 23 October 2015 | CF | ENG | Jack Ryan | Southport | End of Season | |
| 6 November 2015 | LB | ENG | Nick Anderton | Barrow | End of season | |
| 17 November 2015 | CF | NIR | Andy Little | Blackpool | 30 January 2016 | |
| 18 November 2015 | GK | ENG | Steven James | Droylsden | 16 January 2016 | |
| 26 November 2015 | CB | ENG | Josh Heaton | Tamworth | 3 January 2016 | |
| 7 January 2016 | DF | ENG | Ben Davies | Newport County | End of season | |
| 14 January 2016 | MF | ENG | Josh Brownhill | Barnsley | End of season | |
| 24 March 2016 | CF | NIR | Andy Little | Accrington Stanley | End of season | |

== Competitions ==
=== Pre-season friendlies ===
On 1 June 2015, Preston North End announced their first friendly against Chorley, competing for the Jack Kirkland Trophy. Pre-season friendlies were announced on the club's fixture list.

| 11 July 2015 Jack Kirkland Trophy | Chorley | 0–0 | Preston North End | Chorley |
| 15:00 GMT (UTC+1) | | Report | | Stadium: Victory Park; Attendance: 2,022; Referee: Scott Oldham |

| 14 July 2015 Friendly | Bamber Bridge | 0–4 | Preston North End | Bamber Bridge |
| 19:00 BST | | Report | Garner 19' (pen.); Beckford 45'; Reid 49'; Hugill 70' | Stadium: Sir Tom Finney Stadium; Attendance: 1,623; Referee: Neil Swarbrick |

| 18 July 2015 Friendly | Preston North End | 1–0 | Heart of Midlothian | Preston |
| 15:00 BST | Garner 65' | Report | | Stadium: Deepdale; Attendance: 4,860 (1,614 away); Referee: Darren Handley |

| 21 July 2015 Friendly | Southport | 0–4 | Preston North End | Blowick |
| 19:00 BST | | Report | Hugill 43'; Little 57'; Keane 80'; Brownhill 90' | Stadium: Merseyrail Community Stadium; Attendance: 967 (594 away); Referee: Peter Wright |

| 24 July 2015 Friendly | Motherwell | 1–2 | Preston North End | Livingston, Scotland |
| 19:00 BST | Moult 89' | Report | Garner 28'; Kilkenny 30' | Stadium: Almondvale Stadium; Attendance: 483; Referee: John Beaton |

| 28 July 2015 Friendly | Carlisle United | 4–3 | Preston North End | Carlisle |
| 19:15 BST | Miller (?); Kennedy (?); Grainger 38' (pen.) | Report | Hugill 12', 49'; Keane (?) | Stadium: Brunton Park; Attendance: 1,938; Referee: Richard Clark |

| 29 July 2015 Friendly | Ashington | 0–1 | Preston North End XI | Ashington |
| 19:30 BST | | Report | Ryan 62' | Stadium: Woodhorn Lane; Attendance: 500; Referee: Michael Oliver |

| 1 August 2015 Friendly | Bury | 3–2 | Preston North End | Bury |
| 15:00 BST | Soares 11'; Clarke 66'; Tutte 79' (pen.) | Report | Garner 14'; Keane 31' | Stadium: JD Stadium; Attendance: 1,307 (366 PNE fans) |

=== Championship ===
==== League table ====
| Pos | Team | Pld | W | D | L | GF | GA | GD | Pts |
|---|---|---|---|---|---|---|---|---|---|
| 9 | Brentford | 46 | 19 | 8 | 19 | 72 | 67 | +5 | 65 |
| 10 | Birmingham City | 46 | 16 | 15 | 15 | 53 | 49 | +4 | 63 |
| 11 | Preston North End | 46 | 15 | 17 | 14 | 45 | 45 | 0 | 62 |
| 12 | Queens Park Rangers | 46 | 14 | 18 | 14 | 54 | 54 | 0 | 60 |
| 13 | Leeds United | 46 | 14 | 17 | 15 | 50 | 58 | −8 | 59 |

Source: BBC Sport
Rules for classification: 1) Points; 2) Goal difference; 3) Number of goals scored

==== Matches ====
| 9 August 2015 1 | Preston North End | 0–0 | Middlesbrough | Preston |
| 12:00 BST | | Report | | Stadium: Deepdale; Attendance: 15,974; Referee: Chris Kavanagh |

| 15 August 2015 2 | Milton Keynes Dons | 0–1 | Preston North End | Milton Keynes |
| 15:00 BST | | Report | Gallagher 28' | Stadium: stadium:mk Attendance: 11,035; Referee: Andy Madley |

| 18 August 2015 3 | Rotherham United | 0–0 | Preston North End | Rotherham |
| 19:45 BST | | Report | | Stadium: AESSEAL New York Stadium; Attendance: 9,078; Referee: David Coote |

| 22 August 2015 4 | Preston North End | 1–2 | Ipswich Town | Preston |
| 15:00 BST | Johnson 37' | Report | Pitman 24'; Fraser 65' | Stadium: Deepdale; Attendance: 12,330; Referee: Mark Brown |

| 29 August 2015 5 | Hull City | 2–0 | Preston North End | Kingston upon Hull |
| 15:00 BST | Hernández 37'; Davies 82' | Report | | Stadium: KC Stadium; Attendance: 16,949; Referee: Fred Graham |

| 12 September 2015 6 | Preston North End | 1–2 | Derby County | Preston |
| 15:00 BST | Johnson 90' | Report | Martin 23', 36' | Stadium: Deepdale; Attendance: 14,552; Referee: Richard Clark |

| 15 September 2015 7 | Preston North End | 1–1 | Bristol City | Preston |
| 19:45 BST | Kilkenny 40' | Report | Wilbraham 81' | Stadium: Deepdale; Attendance: 9,963; Referee: Eddie Ilderton |

| 19 September 2015 8 | Brentford | 2–1 | Preston North End | London |
| 15:00 BST | Vibe 62'; Djuricin 65' | Report | Johnson 1' | Stadium: Griffin Park; Referee: Tim Robinson |

| 26 September 2015 9 | Preston North End | 1–1 | Wolverhampton Wanderers | Preston |
| 15:00 BST | Johnson 10'; Garner (red card) 19'; Wright (yellow card) 78' (yellow-red card) 81' | Report | McDonald 90+1' | Stadium: Deepdale; Attendance: 13,049; Referee: Trevor Kettle |

| 3 October 2015 10 | Sheffield Wednesday | 3–1 | Preston North End | Sheffield |
| 15:00 BST | Lee 45+1'; Pudil 55'; McGugan 90+6' | Report | Browne 76' | Stadium: Hillsborough Stadium; Attendance: 20,383; Referee: Andy Woolmer |

| 17 October 2015 11 | Preston North End | 0–0 | Cardiff City | Preston |
| 15:00 BST | | Report | | Stadium: Deepdale; Attendance: 11,125; Referee: Stuart Atwell |

| 20 October 2015 12 | Charlton Athletic | 0–3 | Preston North End | London |
| 19:45 BST | | Report | Gallagher 2', 36'; Johnson 62' | Stadium: The Valley; Attendance: 13,586; Referee: Simon Hooper |

| 24 October 2015 13 | Brighton & Hove Albion | 0–0 | Preston North End | Brighton |
| 15:00 BST | | Report | | Stadium: Falmer Stadium; Attendance: 24,629; Referee: Andy Davies |

| 31 October 2015 14 | Preston North End | 0–0 | Bolton Wanderers | Preston |
| 15:00 GMT | | Report | | Stadium: Deepdale; Attendance: 14,494; Referee: Dean Whitestone |

| 3 November 2015 15 | Preston North End | 1–0 | Nottingham Forest | Preston |
| 19:45 GMT | Doyle 2' | Report | | Stadium: Deepdale; Attendance: 10,216; Referee: Tony Harrington |

| 7 November 2015 16 | Queens Park Rangers | 0–0 | Preston North End | London |
| 15:00 GMT | | Report | | Stadium: Loftus Road; Attendance: 15,190; Referee: Robert Lewis |

| 21 November 2015 17 | Preston North End | 1–2 | Blackburn Rovers | Preston |
| 15:00 BST | Garner 67' | Report | Pickford 31' (o.g.); Rhodes 52' (pen.) | Stadium: Deepdale; Attendance: 19,852; Referee: Mike Dean |

| 28 November 2015 18 | Fulham | 1–1 | Preston North End | London |
| 19:45 GMT | McCormack 77' | Report | Garner 11' | Stadium: Craven Cottage; Attendance: 17,362; Referee: Graham Horwood |

| 5 December 2015 19 | Burnley | 0–2 | Preston North End | Burnley |
| 15:00 GMT | | Report | Keane 63'; Johnson 86' | Stadium: Turf Moor; Attendance: 18,614; Referee: Kevin Friend |

| 12 December 2015 20 | Preston North End | 1–0 | Reading | Preston |
| 15:00 GMT | Garner 52' (pen.) | Report | | Stadium: Deepdale; Attendance: 10,649; Referee: Geoff Eltringham |

| 15 December 2015 21 | Preston North End | 1–1 | Birmingham City | Preston |
| 19:45 GMT | Reach 19' | Report | Morrison 67' | Stadium: Deepdale; Attendance: 10,668; Referee: Kevin Wright |

| 20 December 2015 22 | Leeds United | 1–0 | Preston North End | Leeds |
| 15:00 GMT | Browne 46' (o.g.) | Report | (red card) 30' Pickford | Stadium: Elland Road; Attendance: 22,461; Referee: Gavin Ward |

| 26 December 2015 23 | Huddersfield Town | 3–1 | Preston North End | Huddersfield |
| 15:00 GMT | Wells 38', 55'; Huws 76' | Report | Reach 90' | Stadium: John Smith's Stadium; Attendance: 12,315; Referee: Chris Kavanagh |

| 28 December 2015 24 | Preston North End | 1–0 | Hull City | Preston |
| 15:00 GMT | Gallagher 66' | Report | | Stadium: Deepdale; Attendance: 13,891; Referee: Peter Bankes |

| 2 January 2016 25 | Preston North End | 2–1 | Rotherham United | Preston |
| 15:00 GMT | Doyle 64'; Clarke-Harris 90' (o.g.) | Report | Andreu 35' | Stadium: Deepdale; Attendance: 12,027; Referee: Charles Breakspear |

| 12 January 2016 26 | Bristol City | 1–2 | Preston North End | Bristol |
| 19:45 GMT | Wilbraham 56' | Report | Baker 54' (o.g.); Cunningham 80' | Stadium: Ashton Gate Stadium; Attendance: 14,586; Referee: James Lingington |

| 16 January 2016 27 | Ipswich Town | 1–1 | Preston North End | Ipswich |
| 15:00 GMT | Murphy 38' | Report | Johnson 7' | Stadium: Portman Road; Attendance: 21,108; Referee: Simon Hooper |

| 23 January 2016 28 | Preston North End | 1–3 | Brentford | Preston |
| 15:00 GMT | Reach 24' | Report | Cunningham 22' (o.g.); Judge 43'; Swift 80' | Stadium: Deepdale; Attendance: 11,080; Referee: David Webb |

| 2 February 2016 29 | Derby County | 0–0 | Preston North End | Derby |
| 19:45 GMT | | Report | | Stadium: Pride Park Stadium; Attendance: 27,252; Referee: Oliver Langford |

| 6 February 2016 30 | Preston North End | 2–1 | Huddersfield Town | Preston |
| 15:00 GMT | Lynch 83' (o.g.); Browne 90' | Report | Wells 80' | Stadium: Deepdale; Attendance: 12,653; Referee: Darren Drysdale |

| 13 February 2016 31 | Wolverhampton Wanderers | 1–2 | Preston North End | Wolverhampton |
| 15:00 GMT | Mason 66' | Report | 17' Gallagher; 53' Reach | Stadium: Molineux Stadium; Attendance: 21,204; Referee: Kevin Johnson |

| 20 February 2016 32 | Preston North End | 1–0 | Sheffield Wednesday | Preston |
| 15:00 GMT | Garner 73' | Report | (yellow card) 49' (yellow-red card) 66' Forestieri | Stadium: Deepdale; Attendance: 16,923; Referee: Keith Stroud |

| 23 February 2016 33 | Preston North End | 2–1 | Charlton Athletic | Preston |
| 15:00 GMT | Garner 35'; Robinson 52' | Report | Guðmundsson 57'; Lennon (red card) 74' | Stadium: Deepdale; Attendance: 10,075; Referee: James Adcock |

| 27 February 2016 34 | Cardiff City | 2–1 | Preston North End | Cardiff |
| 15:00 GMT | Pilkington 44' (pen.), 80' (pen.) | Report | 87' Robinson | Stadium: Cardiff City Stadium; Attendance: 15,566; Referee: Brendan Malone |

| 5 March 2016 35 | Preston North End | 0–0 | Brighton & Hove Albion | Preston |
| 15:00 GMT | | Report | | Stadium: Deepdale; Attendance: 11,881; Referee: Mark Heywood |

| 8 March 2016 36 | Nottingham Forest | 1–0 | Preston North End | Nottingham |
| 19:45 GMT | Oliveira 37' | Report | | Stadium: City Ground; Attendance: 16,747; Referee: Mark Brown |

| 12 March 2016 37 | Bolton Wanderers | 1–2 | Preston North End | Bolton |
| 15:00 GMT | Trotter 22' | Report | Hugill 57'; Vermijl 86' | Stadium: Macron Stadium; Attendance: 18,423; Referee: Paul Tierney |

| 19 March 2016 38 | Preston North End | 1–1 | Queens Park Rangers | Preston |
| 15:00 GMT | Doyle 90+2' | Report | Polter 5' | Stadium: Deepdale; Attendance: 11,322; Referee: Andy Woolmer |

| 2 April 2016 39 | Blackburn Rovers | 1–2 | Preston North End | Blackburn |
| 12:30 BST | Ward 13' Duffy (red card) 24' | Report | Garner 25' (pen.) Hugill 43' | Stadium: Ewood Park; Attendance: 21,029; Referee: Eddie Ilderton |

| 5 April 2016 40 | Preston North End | 1–2 | Fulham | Preston |
| 19:45 BST | Vermijl 63' | Report | 5' McCormack; 74' Dembele | Stadium: Deepdale; Attendance: 10,358; Referee: Scott Duncan |

| 9 April 2016 41 | Middlesbrough | 1–0 | Preston North End | Middlesbrough, England |
| 15:00 BST | Adomah 32' | Report | | Stadium: Riverside Stadium; Attendance: 26,390; Referee: Oliver Langford |

| 16 April 2016 42 | Preston North End | 1–1 | Milton Keynes Dons | Preston |
| 15:00 BST | Beckford 6' | Report | 54' Maynard | Stadium: Deepdale; Attendance: 10,457; Referee: Stuart Attwell |

| 19 April 2016 43 | Birmingham City | 2–2 | Preston North End | Birmingham |
| 15:00 BST | Donaldson 13', 59'; Maghoma (yellow card) 38'; Lafferty (yellow card) 90+1' | Report | Gallagher (yellow card) 3'; Garner (yellow card) 35'; Pearson (yellow card) 40'; Wright (yellow card) 58'; Huntington (yellow card) 68'; Browne 73'; Cunningham 89' | Stadium: St Andrew's; Attendance: 14,366; Referee: Keith Stroud |

| 22 April 2016 44 | Preston North End | 0–1 | Burnley | Preston |
| 19:45 BST | Garner (yellow card) 45'; Wright (yellow card) 60'; Robinson (yellow card) 90+6' | Report | Barton 6', (yellow card) 80'; Marney (yellow card) 43'; Lowton (yellow card) 45'; Gray (yellow card) 73'; Mee (yellow card) 82' | Stadium: Deepdale; Attendance: 17,789 (5,630 away); Referee: Kevin Friend |

| 30 April 2016 45 | Reading | 1–2 | Preston North End | Reading |
| 15:00 BST (UTC+1) | Quinn 86' | Report | Beckford 56'; Johnson 90+1' | Stadium: Madejski Stadium; Attendance: 15,834; Referee: Darren Deadman |

| 7 May 2016 46 | Preston North End | 1–1 | Leeds United | Preston |
| 12:30 BST | Hugill 90+2' | Report | Wood 78' (pen.) | Stadium: Deepdale; Attendance: 18,473; Referee: Brendan Malone |

=== FA Cup ===
| 9 January 2016 Round 3 | Peterborough United | 2–0 | Preston North End | Peterborough |
| 15:00 GMT | Samuelsen 7'; Washington 52' | Report | | Stadium: London Road Stadium; Attendance: 7,665; Referee: Tony Harrington |

=== League Cup ===
| 12 August 2015 First round | Crewe Alexandra | 1–3 | Preston North End | Crewe |
| 19:45 BST | King 36' | Report | Hugill 5'; Keane 13'; Brownhill 86' | Stadium: Gresty Road; Attendance: 2,852; Referee: Scott Duncan |

| 25 August 2015 Second round | Preston North End | 1–0 | Watford | Preston |
| 19:45 BST | Vermijl 8' | Report | | Stadium: Deepdale; Attendance: 6,250; Referee: Steve Martin |

| 22 September 2015 Third round | Preston North End | 2–2 (2–3 p) | Bournemouth | Preston |
| 19:45 BST | Hugill 84'; Johnson 118' (pen.) | Report | MacDonald 23'; Pugh 96' | Stadium: Deepdale; Attendance: 5,643; Referee: Nigel Miller |
| | Penalties |
| | Hugill (penalty missed); Keane (penalty scored); Reid (penalty scored); Browne (penalty missed); Johnson (penalty missed) | | (penalty scored) Stanislas; (penalty scored) Cook; (penalty missed) Gosling; (penalty scored) Pugh |

=== Lancashire Senior Cup ===
| 7 September 2015 First round | Everton | 3–0 | Preston North End | Blowick |
| 19:45 BST | Rodríguez 10'; Grant; Walsh (?) | Report | | Stadium: Merseyrail Community Stadium; Attendance: TBC; Referee: Darren Bond |

== Overall summary ==
=== Summary ===
| Games played | 50 (46 Championship, 1 FA Cup, 3 League Cup) |
| Games won | 17 (15 Championship, 0 FA Cup, 2 League Cup) |
| Games drawn | 18 (17 Championship, 0 FA Cup, 1 League Cup) |
| Games lost | 15 (14 Championship, 1 FA Cup, 0 League Cup) |
| Goals scored | 51 (45 Championship, 0 FA Cup, 6 League Cup) |
| Goals conceded | 48 (45 Championship, 0 FA Cup, 3 League Cup) |
| Goal difference | 0 |
| Clean sheets | 16 (15 Championship, 0 FA Cup, 1 League Cup) |
| Yellow cards | 88 (83 Championship, 0 FA Cup, 4 League Cup) |
| Red cards | 3 (3 Championship, 0 FA Cup, 0 League Cup) |
| Worst discipline | Joe Garner (11 (yellow card) , 1 (red card) ) |
| Best result | W 3–0 vs Charlton Athletic (20 Oct 15) |
| Worst result | L 0–2 vs Hull City (29 Aug 15); L 1–3 vs Sheffield Wednesday (3 Oct 15); L 1–3 vs Huddersfield Town (26 December 2015); L 1–3 Brentford (23 January 2016) |
| Most appearances | Daniel Johnson (38 starts, 2 sub) |
| Top scorer | Daniel Johnson (7) |
| Points | 62 |

=== Score overview ===
| Opposition | Home score | Away score | Double |
|---|---|---|---|
| Birmingham City | 1–1 | 2-2 | No |
| Blackburn Rovers | 1–2 | 2–1 | No |
| Bolton Wanderers | 0–0 | 2–1 | No |
| Brentford | 1–3 | 1–2 | No |
| Brighton & Hove Albion | 0–0 | 0–0 | No |
| Bristol City | 1–1 | 2–1 | No |
| Burnley | 0–1 | 2–0 | No |
| Cardiff City | 0–0 | 1–2 | No |
| Charlton Athletic | 2–1 | 3–0 | Yes |
| Derby County | 1–2 | 0–0 | No |
| Fulham | 1–2 | 1–1 | No |
| Huddersfield Town | 2–1 | 1–3 | No |
| Hull City | 1–0 | 0–2 | No |
| Ipswich Town | 1–2 | 1–1 | No |
| Leeds United | 1–1 | 0–1 | No |
| Middlesbrough | 0–0 | 0–1 | No |
| Milton Keynes Dons | 1–1 | 1–0 | No |
| Nottingham Forest | 1–0 | 0–1 | No |
| Queens Park Rangers | 1–1 | 0–0 | No |
| Reading | 1–0 | 2–1 | Yes |
| Rotherham United | 2–1 | 0–0 | No |
| Sheffield Wednesday | 1–0 | 1–3 | No |
| Wolverhampton Wanderers | 1–1 | 2–1 | No |
