= Anders Lindegaard =

Danish footballer (born 1984)

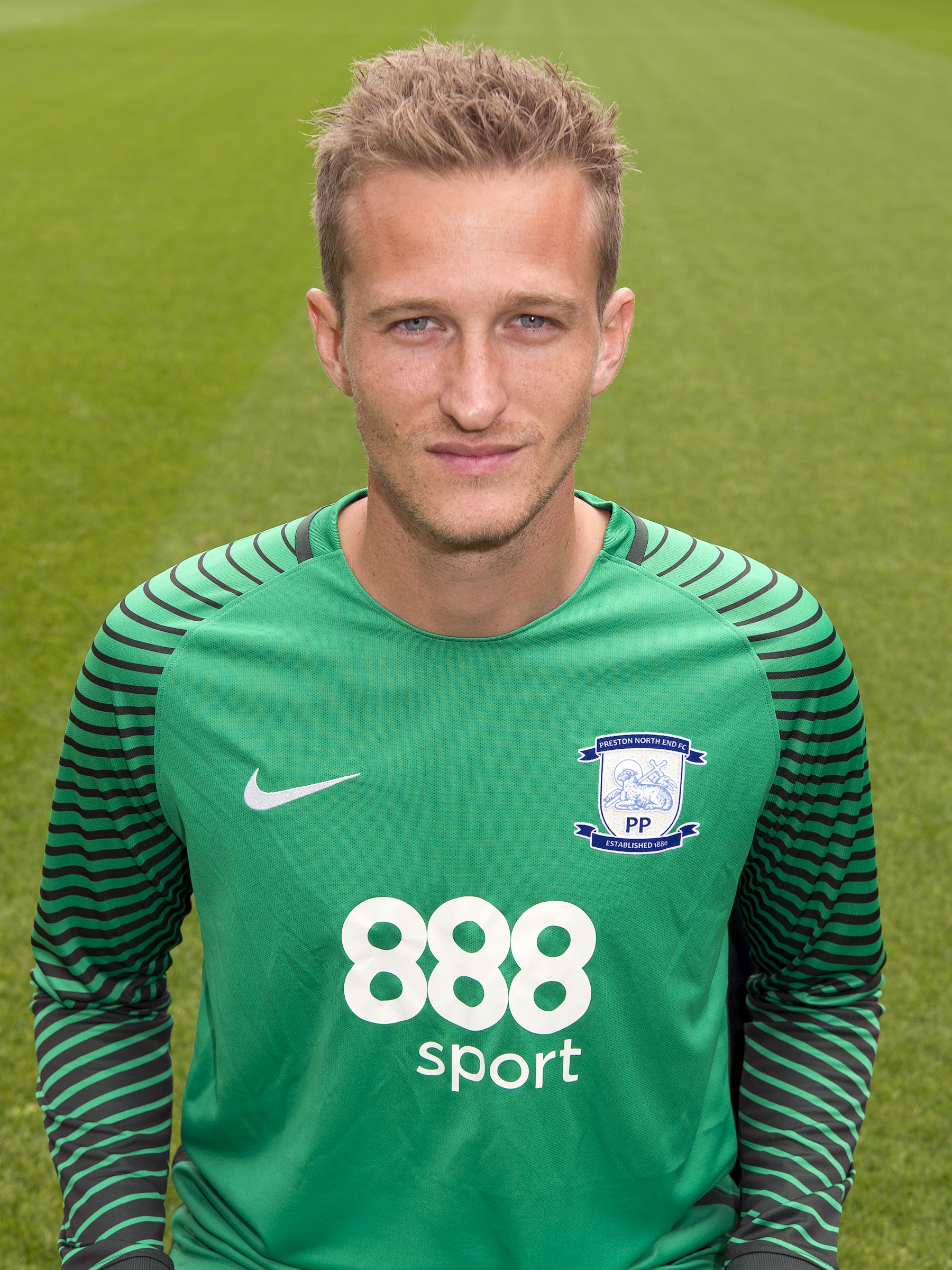
- Lindegaard with Preston North End in 2016

Personal information
- Full name: Anders Rozenkrantz Lindegaard
- Date of birth: 13 April 1984 (age 42)
- Place of birth: Odense, Denmark
- Height: 1.93 m (6 ft 4 in)
- Position: Goalkeeper

Youth career
- 2001–2003: OB

Senior career*
Years	Team	Apps	(Gls)
2003–2009	OB	6	(0)
2008	→ Kolding (loan)	10	(0)
2009	→ Aalesund (loan)	18	(0)
2009–2010	Aalesund	38	(0)
2010–2015	Manchester United	19	(0)
2015–2016	West Bromwich Albion	0	(0)
2016	→ Preston North End (loan)	14	(0)
2016–2017	Preston North End	8	(0)
2017–2019	Burnley	0	(0)
2019–2022	Helsingborg	54	(1)

International career
2002	Denmark U19	2	(0)
2003	Denmark U20	4	(0)
2010–2011	Denmark	5	(0)
- * Club domestic league appearances and goals

Anders Rozenkrantz Lindegaard (Danish: [ˈɑnɐs ˈle̝nəˌkɒˀ]; born 13 April 1984) is a Danish former professional footballer who played as a goalkeeper.

Lindegaard began his career with his hometown club, Odense Boldklub, but a lack of first-team opportunities led to a move to Norwegian club Aalesund in 2009, with whom he won the Norwegian Football Cup. After winning the Goalkeeper of the Year award in both Denmark and Norway in 2010, Lindegaard was signed by Manchester United. He spent five years at Old Trafford, initially as back-up to Edwin van der Sar and then to David de Gea, winning the Premier League title and two Community Shields. He moved to West Bromwich Albion in 2015, but was unable to break into the team and joined Preston North End in January 2016, initially on loan. He joined Burnley in September 2017.

Lindegaard represented Denmark at under-19 and under-20 level before making his senior debut on 7 September 2010 against Iceland. He earned five caps for the Denmark national team in total.

== Club career ==
=== Odense ===
Born in the Dyrup suburb of Odense, Lindegaard started his career at local Danish Superliga team Odense Boldklub (OB). He made his Danish Superliga debut in a 3–1 victory against Silkeborg IF on 19 November 2006. He made his UEFA competition debut on 30 July 2009, in a 4–3 win over Rabotnički. During most of his time with OB, he was kept out of the team by Arek Onyszko, and he had two loan spells at Kolding FC, where he remained undefeated in the ten league games he got for the team, after it had lost the first four games of the season, and Aalesunds FK, who he would later join permanently. When Onyszko was sacked by Odense in June 2009 due to him being convicted for assaulting his ex-wife, Lindegaard was seen as his replacement.

=== Aalesund ===
In 2009, he joined Norwegian club Aalesunds FK on loan and later permanently. In 2009, he won the Norwegian Football Cup with Aalesund. In 2010, Lindegaard was named Goalkeeper of the Year in both Norway and Denmark.

=== Manchester United ===
==== 2010–11 season ====
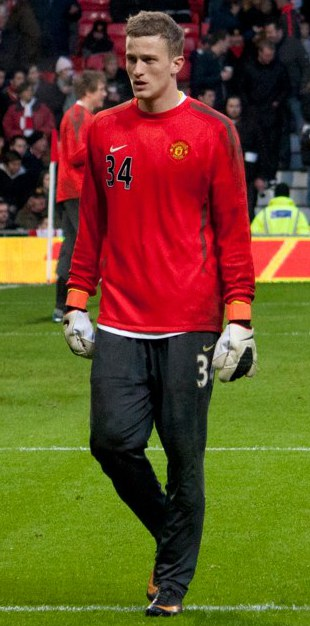
Lindegaard warming up for Manchester United before a game in 2011

Since early November 2010, he was reported to have become a target for English club Manchester United. On 23 November 2010, it was reported that Manchester United manager Sir Alex Ferguson expected to complete the signing of the player in the "next two or three weeks". On 27 November 2010, Lindegaard joined Manchester United on a three-and-a-half-year contract for an undisclosed fee believed to be around £3.5 million. He trained with the first team throughout December, but he was unable to play for his new club until the transfer window re-opened on 1 January 2011. Lindegaard was officially registered with the Premier League on 6 January, and assigned the number 34 jersey.

On 29 January, Lindegaard made his Manchester United debut in a 2–1 victory against Southampton in the FA Cup Fourth round. He made his Old Trafford home debut on 19 February in another FA Cup match, this time against the Conference National side Crawley Town, in which United won 1–0. In March, he underwent knee surgery that would keep him out of action for five weeks.

On 16 May, Lindegaard played in the Manchester Senior Cup final for the Manchester United Reserves against Bolton Wanderers Reserves, which United went on to win 3–1.

==== 2011–12 season ====
On 14 September 2011, Lindegaard made his first UEFA Champions League start for United against Portuguese side Benfica. The match ended in a 1–1 draw with Lindegaard winning critical acclaim for his performance. Sir Alex Ferguson, however, still decided to continue with first-choice keeper David de Gea for the next match in the Premier League against Chelsea. Asked about challenging for the first-team spot, Lindegaard said, "What answer do you expect to that question? I've said a thousand times before I'm not here to pick my nose." On 18 October, Lindegaard was handed his second Champions League start for United. He played against Oțelul Galați, with the match ending in a 2–0 win for United, earning them their first Champions League group stage victory.

On 1 October 2011, Lindegaard made his Premier League debut for United against Norwich City in a 2–0 win at Old Trafford. He continued his run of clean sheets in his next four appearances in the Premier League, which included a 1–0 home win against Sunderland on 5 November, a 1–0 away win against Aston Villa on 3 December, a 5–0 away win at Fulham on 21 December and a 5–0 home win against Wigan Athletic in United's Boxing day fixture. His run of clean sheets in the league finally ended on 4 January away to Newcastle United when he was beaten three times in a game that United lost 3–0. A week later, on 8 January 2012, Lindegaard played his biggest game for Manchester United, a 3–2 win against Manchester City in the FA Cup. He was chosen again for the starting line-up the following week when United beat Bolton Wanderers 3–0. On 30 January 2012, he damaged his ankle ligaments in training, forcing him to miss the game against Stoke City the next day, along with the unwell first-choice David de Gea, meaning youngster Ben Amos played goal. Later in the week, Sir Alex Ferguson revealed Lindegaard would miss the next four to five weeks and would not be expected back until the home game with West Bromwich Albion.

On 3 August 2012, Lindegaard signed a new four-year contract with United, keeping him at the club until June 2016. He also took the number 13 jersey made vacant by the departure of Park Ji-sung, who had left the club for Queens Park Rangers.

==== 2012–13 season ====
Since the match against Norwich on 17 November 2012, first-choice goalkeeper David de Gea was sidelined with wisdom teeth problems. Lindegaard was kept in goal for United's next five games until De Gea was recalled for the Champions League match against CFR Cluj. Lindegaard returned to the first team on 1 December 2012, against Reading in a match which ended 4–3. After the match, he came in for criticism by former United goalkeeper Alex Stepney, who said that he lacks "authority at the back". After a long period on the bench as an understudy to De Gea, and with United having already secured the Premier League title a month earlier, Lindegaard started in goal for Sir Alex Ferguson's final game as United manager against West Brom at The Hawthorns; the match finished 5–5. That appearance was Lindegaard's tenth of the season, thus qualifying him to receive a Premier League winner's medal.

==== 2013–14 season ====
In 2013–14, Lindegaard made just three appearances for the Manchester United first team – against Norwich in the League Cup, Swansea City in the FA Cup and Newcastle in the Premier League– keeping clean sheets against Norwich and Newcastle.

=== West Bromwich Albion ===
On 31 August 2015, Lindegaard joined West Bromwich Albion on a free transfer, signing a two-year contract.

=== Preston North End ===
On 23 January 2016, Lindegaard joined Championship side Preston North End on loan for the remainder of the 2015–16 season. He made his debut on 2 February where he kept a clean sheet against Derby County. He was voted Man of the Match on his home debut, against Huddersfield Town.

On 2 July 2016, Lindegaard signed a one-year permanent deal with Preston North End after the mutual termination of his West Brom contract.

=== Burnley ===
On 21 September 2017, Lindegaard joined Premier League side Burnley on a free transfer. He made his Burnley debut as a substitute for the injured Nick Pope during the Europa League second qualifying round on 26 July 2018. After making another Europa League appearance against Aberdeen, his contract was not renewed and he was released by the club.

=== Helsingborg ===
On 18 July 2019 Lindegaard signed for Allsvenskan side Helsingborgs IF until December 2021. On 19 July 2020, he scored the first goal of his career in a 2020 Allsvenskan 2–2 draw against Falkenbergs FF.

After Helsingborg was relegated from Allsvenskan in November 2022, Lindegaard announced his retirement from football.

== International career ==
Lindegaard has represented Denmark at under-19, under-20 and senior level. He made his debut for the U-19s in September 2002, and played a 2003 UEFA European Under-19 Football Championship qualification 1–0 win over Switzerland on 13 October 2002. He played a total six youth international games until September 2003.

Lindegaard made his senior international debut in a UEFA Euro 2012 qualifier against Iceland on 7 September 2010, which Denmark won 1–0. On 8 October 2010, Denmark faced Portugal in another Euro 2012 qualifier. Early on in the game, with Denmark trailing 2–0, an injury sustained by starting goalkeeper Thomas Sørensen brought Lindegaard into action. He made many saves to keep his team in the game, but conceded a goal in the 85th minute to Cristiano Ronaldo with the match finishing 3–1 in Portugal's favour. Lindegaard started the following Euro 2012 qualifier against Cyprus, in which he kept a clean sheet as Denmark won 2–0. He was expected to feature for Denmark at the Euro 2012 finals but due to injuries while playing for his club and lack of proper game time post-recovery, his national teammate Stephan Andersen took over after normal second-choice goalkeeper Thomas Sørensen was injured in a pre-tournament friendly against Brazil.

== Personal life ==
Lindegaard married The Real Housewives of Cheshire star, Misse Beqiri, a Swedish model of Albanian roots, in June 2014. They split in 2016. They have a son named Julian.

Following his retirement from professional football, Lindegaard is reported to have joined UBS in a role as a business developer in Copenhagen.

=== LGBT activism ===
Lindegaard has spoken out against the intolerance of homosexuality in football and the absence of openly gay players from the game. In 2012, he wrote,

As a footballer I think first and foremost that a homosexual colleague is afraid of the reception he could get from the fans. My impression is that the players would not have a problem accepting a homosexual. Homosexuality in football is a taboo subject. The atmosphere on the pitch and in the stands is tough. The mechanisms are primitive, and it is often expressed through a classic stereotype that a real man should be brave, strong and aggressive. And it is not the image that a football fan associates with a gay person. The problem for me is that a lot of football fans are stuck in a time of intolerance that does not deserve to be compared with modern society's development in the last decades. While the rest of the world has been more liberal, civilised and less prejudiced, the world of football remains stuck in the past when it comes to tolerance. Homosexuals are in need of a hero. They are in need of someone who dares to stand up for their sexuality.

== Career statistics ==
=== Club ===
Appearances and goals by club, season and competition
Club	Season	League			National cup		League cup		Europe		Other		Total	
Club	Season	Division	Apps	Goals	Apps	Goals	Apps	Goals	Apps	Goals	Apps	Goals	Apps	Goals
OB	2003–04	Superliga	0	0	0	0	—		—		—		0	0
OB	2004–05	Superliga	0	0	0	0	—		0	0	—		0	0
OB	2005–06	Superliga	0	0	0	0	—		—		—		0	0
OB	2006–07	Superliga	1	0	0	0	—		0	0	2 (Note: Appearances in Royal League)	0	3	0
OB	2007–08	Superliga	1	0	0	0	—		0	0	—		1	0
OB	2008–09	Superliga	0	0	0	0	—		0	0	—		0	0
OB	2009–10	Superliga	4	0	0	0	—		2 (Note: Appearances in UEFA Europa League)	0	—		6	0
OB	Total		6	0	0	0	—		2	0	2	0	10	0
Kolding (loan)	2008–09	1. Division	10	0	0	0	—		—		—		10	0
Aalesund	2009	Tippeligaen	26	0	3	0	—		—		—		29	0
Aalesund	2010	Tippeligaen	30	0	1	0	—		2	0	1 (Note: Appearance in Superfinalen)	0	34	0
Aalesund	Total		56	0	4	0	—		2	0	1	0	63	0
Manchester United	2010–11	Premier League	0	0	2	0	—		—		—		2	0
Manchester United	2011–12	Premier League	8	0	1	0	0	0	2 (Note: Appearances in UEFA Champions League)	0	0	0	11	0
Manchester United	2012–13	Premier League	10	0	1	0	1	0	1	0	—		13	0
Manchester United	2013–14	Premier League	1	0	1	0	1	0	0	0	0	0	3	0
Manchester United	2014–15	Premier League	0	0	0	0	0	0	0	0	—		0	0
Manchester United	Total		19	0	5	0	2	0	3	0	0	0	29	0
West Bromwich Albion	2015–16	Premier League	0	0	0	0	1	0	—		—		1	0
Preston North End (loan)	2015–16	Championship	14	0	—		—		—		—		14	0
Preston North End	2016–17	Championship	8	0	0	0	2	0	—		—		10	0
Preston North End	Total		22	0	0	0	2	0	—		—		24	0
Burnley	2017–18	Premier League	0	0	0	0	—		—		—		0	0
Burnley	2018–19	Premier League	0	0	0	0	0	0	2	0	—		2	0
Burnley	Total		0	0	0	0	0	0	2	0	—		2	0
Helsingborg	2019	Allsvenskan	15	0	0	0	—		—		—		15	0
Helsingborg	2020	Allsvenskan	11	1	0	0	—		—		—		7	1
Helsingborg	2021	Superettan	0	0	0	0	—		—		—		0	0
Helsingborg	Total		26	1	0	0	—		—		—		22	1
Career total			139	1	9	0	4	0	9	0	3	0	161	1

=== International ===
Appearances and goals by national team and year
National team	Year	Apps	Goals
Denmark	2010	4	0
Denmark	2011	1	0
Total		5	0

== Honours ==
Aalesund

- Norwegian Football Cup: 2009

Manchester United

- Premier League: 2012–13
- FA Community Shield: 2011, 2013

Individual

- Kniksen Goalkeeper of the Year: 2010
- Danish Goalkeeper of the Year: 2010
