= Jack Ryan (English footballer) =

English association football player

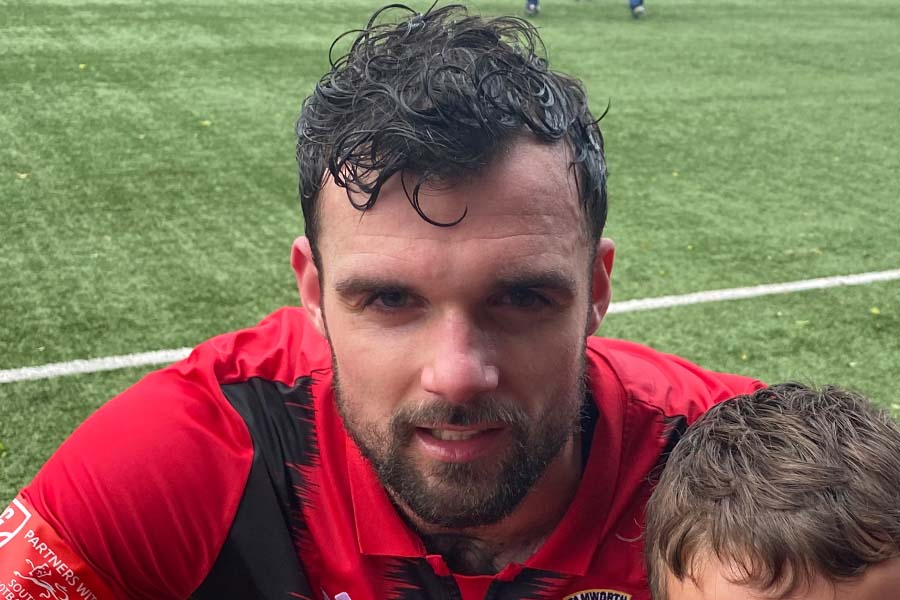
- Ryan in October 2020

Personal information
- Full name: Jack Liam Ryan
- Date of birth: 5 April 1996 (age 30)
- Place of birth: Barrow-in-Furness, England
- Height: 1.83 m (6 ft 0 in)
- Position: Forward

Youth career
- Blackburn Rovers
- 2012–2014: Preston North End

Senior career*
Years	Team	Apps	(Gls)
2014–2016	Preston North End	1	(0)
2014	→ Stalybridge Celtic (loan)	12	(0)
2014	→ Stockport County (loan)	16	(8)
2015	→ Morecambe (loan)	3	(0)
2015–2016	→ Southport (loan)	13	(1)
2016	Bradford (Park Avenue)	8	(0)
2016–2017	Workington	32	(5)
2018–2020	Olympia FC Warriors		
2020	Guiseley	1	(0)
2020–2021	Tamworth	2	(1)
2021	Stalybridge Celtic	8	(0)
- * Club domestic league appearances and goals as of 01:07, 10 May 2022

Jack Liam Ryan (born 5 April 1996) is an English footballer who plays for Northern Premier League Division One West side Stalybridge Celtic, where he played as a forward.

== Playing career ==
=== Preston North End ===
Ryan attended the Blackburn Rovers Academy before being released. He joined the Preston North End youth set-up after a month-long trial in 2012. He turned professional with 'the lilywhites' in July 2014, having spent time on loan at Stalybridge Celtic in the 2013–14 season. He returned on loan to the Conference North with Stockport County at the start of the 2014–15 campaign. He made his debut in the Football League on 4 October 2014, coming on for Joe Garner late into a 4–2 victory over Colchester United at Deepdale.

=== Morecambe (loan) ===
On 5 August 2015, he joined Morecambe on loan until 31 October 2015. After playing just 41 minutes over three appearances for Morecambe, he returned to Preston. On 20 October, Ryan went out on loan again but this time to National League club Southport.

=== Bradford (Park Avenue) ===
Following his release from Preston North End in 2016, Ryan signed for Bradford (Park Avenue).

=== Workington ===
In November 2016, Ryan was released from his contract in order to sign for Workington.

=== Guiseley ===
Jack returned to English football, and signed for National League North side Guiseley on 3 October 2020.

=== Tamworth ===
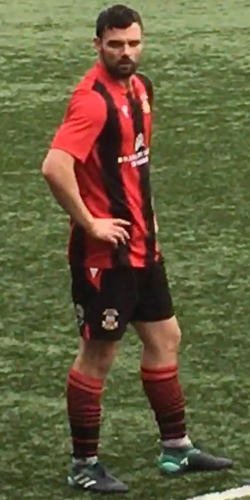
Ryan playing for Tamworth in October 2020.

Ryan soon departed Guiseley and signed for Southern League Premier Division Central side Tamworth on 16 October 2020.

Jack made his debut for Tamworth on 17 October 2020, in a Southern League Premier Division Central fixture at home to Royston Town, the match finished 1–1.

Ryan started the following Southern League Premier Division Central fixture at home to Biggleswade Town on 24 October 2020, and scored the first goal in a 3–0 victory for the home side.

=== Stalybridge Celtic ===
Ryan signed for Northern Premier League Premier Division side Stalybridge Celtic on 23 July 2021. He left the club in September 2021.

== Career statistics ==
=== Club ===
As of match played 11 November 2020

Appearances and goals by club, season and competition
Club	Season	League			FA Cup		League Cup		Other		Total	
Club	Season	Division	Apps	Goals	Apps	Goals	Apps	Goals	Apps	Goals	Apps	Goals
Preston North End	2013–14	League One	0	0	0	0	0	0	0	0	0	0
Stalybridge Celtic (loan)	2013–14	Conference North	12	0	0	0	—		0	0	12	0
Preston North End	2014–15	League One	1	0	0	0	0	0	0	0	1	0
Stockport County (loan)	2014–15	Conference North	16	8	1	0	—		3	2	20	10
Preston North End	2015–16	Championship	0	0	0	0	0	0	0	0	0	0
Morecambe (loan)	2015–16	League Two	3	0	0	0	0	0	2	0	5	0
Southport (loan)	2015–16	National League	13	1	0	0	—		0	0	13	1
Bradford (Park Avenue)	2016–17	National League North	8	0	0	0	—		0	0	8	0
Guiseley	2020–21	National League North	1	0	0	0	—		0	0	1	0
Tamworth	2020–21	Southern League Premier Division Central	2	1	0	0	—		1 (Note: One appearance in FA Trophy)	0	3	1
Stalybridge Celtic	2021–22	Northern Premier League Premier Division	0	0	0	0	—		0	0	0	0
Career total			56	10	1	0	0	0	6	2	63	12
